= The Best of Ivy Queen =

Greatest hits album by Ivy Queen
- Released: December 20, 2005
- Recorded: 1995–1996; 1998; 2000–2003; 2004
- Genre: Reggaeton, hip hop
- Length: 43:36
- Label: Universal Music Latino, Perfect Image
- Producer: Noriega, DJ Nelson, Ecko, Tony "CD" Kelly, DJ Adam, DJ Alex, DJ Eric, Rafi Mercenario, Dennis Nieves

Ivy Queen chronology
Flashback (2005)	The Best of Ivy Queen (2005)	Sentimiento (2007)

The Best of Ivy Queen is the first greatest hits compilation by the reggaetón recording artist Ivy Queen released on December 20, 2005, on Universal Music Latin and Perfect Image Records. Disc one contains studio tracks from her third and fourth studio albums, Diva (2003) and Real (2004), while disc two consists of music videos from her discography beginning in 1995 up to 2005 with the release of her fifth studio album, Flashback. Diva was released on August 23, 2003, and independently distributed by Real Music Group. The album follows her two previous studio album which were both commercially unsuccessful. With collaborations with Latin hip hop artists including Mexicano 777 and K-7, the album's production was by a variety of music producers, including Luny Tunes, DJ Nelson and Noriega, while DJ Adam produced a majority of the tracks.

Six singles were released from the album: "Quiero Bailar", "Quiero Saber", "Papi Te Quiero", "Guillaera", "Tuya Soy" and "Tu No Puedes". Three of these are on The Best of Ivy Queen. Highly anticipated and acclaimed, Diva peaked at #24 on the Billboard Top Latin Albums chart, #8 on the Billboard Top Heatseekers chart for the South Atlantic area, #4 on the Billboard Reggae Albums and #1 on the Billboard Tropical Albums chart.

Real was released on November 16, 2004, through Universal Latino. Queen collaborated with several top-name artist from the hip hop and reggaetón genres including Hector El Father, Fat Joe, Getto & Gastam, La India, Gran Omar and Mickey Perfecto, though this release does not have the collaborations. The tracks on the album were produced mainly by Rafi Mercenario. It also included guest production by the American producer, Swizz Beatz, and the Puerto Ricans Ecko and DJ Nelson. It was her first and only studio album to be labeled and shipped with the Parent Advisory Warning label.

Two singles which appear on this compilation release, "Chika Ideal" and "Dile", both of which are on Real, peaked at #25 on the Billboard Top Latin Albums chart, #4 on the Billboard Top Reggae Albums chart, and #6 on the Billboard Tropical Albums chart. "Dile" peaked at #8 on the Billboard Tropical Songs chart. However, the former was unable to acquire chart success. The album was re-released on September 25, 2007, through Machete Music. The albums are regarded as a factor in reggaetón mainstream exposure to English-speaking markets in 2004 along with other albums by Daddy Yankee and Tego Calderón. The Best of Ivy Queen reached #55 on the Billboard Top Latin Albums chart, while reaching #13 on the Billboard Latin Rhythm Albums chart.

== Recording and production ==
The five tracks on The Best of Ivy Queen which were originally from Diva were recorded between 2000 and 2003. These are "Papi Te Quiero" from the platinum edition of Diva along with "Sangre", a collaboration with Mexicano 777, "Me Acostumbré", "Tuya Soy" and "Guillaera". The other seven tracks, "Dale Volumen", "Dile", "Rebulera", "Mi Barrio", the lead single "Chika Ideal", "Ángel Caído", "Matando" and "Mi Sitaución", were on Real.

Disc two consists of music videos from her early discography up until the compilation's release. These include songs on her fifth studio album, Flashback ("Muchos Quieren Tumbarme" and "Reggae Respect") while "In The Zone", a duet with the Haitian rapper Wyclef Jean appeared on her 1998 studio album, The Original Rude Girl.

Production of both albums was by a variety of hip hop and reggaetón producers, including Noriega, DJ Nelson, Ecko, Tony "CD" Kelly, DJ Adam, DJ Alex, DJ Eric, Rafi Mercenario and Dennis Nieves. Diva was released on August 19, 2003, and independently distributed by Real Music Group. On January 27, 2004, Diva: Platinum Edition was released with five remixes of songs on the original Diva album.

Real was released on November 26, 2004. The album's original release date had been set for September 2004, but this was delayed to November 26. The album was also released in "edited" and "clean" versions. It was re-released on September 25, 2007, on Machete Music, as a result of Ivy Queen's success with her seventh studio album, Sentimiento, which was certified platinum within two months of its release.

== Music and lyrics ==
The mid-tempo, "bubble-gum pop" "Papi Te Quiero" ("Baby I Love You"), named one of the album's biggest hits, "pairs a straightforward love song with the well known reggae riddim Buyout." Ramiro Burr of Billboard stated "Papi Te Quiero" showcases how "effortlessly and quickly she alternately sings and raps, claiming that she has a distinct vocal style that evokes Gwen Stefani". Although, the literal translation of "Papi Te Quiero" is "Daddy I Love You", it is not directed towards Queen's father but to her love interest; "Papi" can be translated to "baby". "Dale Volumen" ("Add Volume"), in a minor key, is characterized by simple harmonic progressions, synthesizers and stick-drum percussion and influenced by reggae and Afro-Latin music.

"Dile" ("Tell Her") features lilting rhythms from Colombia (including cumbia), combining Latin vallenato with reggaetón. Queen noted that she sang the song without rapping to prove she is a complete musician and not just a rapper. "Me Acostumbré" ("I Got Accustomed") and is a "hip-hop ballad". "Rebulera", composed in minor-key song, has Queen asserting that she is "queen" in the genre of reggaetón. The track features synthesizers and strings, and is influenced by reggae and Afro-Latin music. "Mi Barrio" ("My Hood") criticizes "the problems present in Añasco, Puerto Rico". Queen compared the song to "Corazones" by Daddy Yankee from his album, Barrio Fino (2004). On "Tuya Soy", ("I'm Yours") she explains "the story of woman who suspects her husband of infidelity", a controversial theme which has been prominent in Queen's lyrical content.

"Chika Ideal" ("Ideal Girl") assures the protagonist's lover that she wants to be with him and fulfill his dreams. "Guillaera" (Attitude), a duet with Gran Omar, explains what type of man she does and does not desire. Another collaboration with Gran Omar, "Matando" ("Killing"), follows. The song explores dancing in a club. It, in a minor key, features the synthetic instrumentation of techno music. "Muchos Quieren Tumbarme" ("Many Want To Knock Me Down"), alludes to a boxing match with the phrase "many want to knock me down", and cites female empowerment as a prominent theme in the song. In addition to this, she degrades the thought of women's power being underestimated. She speaks directly to men requesting that they not be cowards. She then argues that women are actively struggling for equality among their male peers, later asserting that "women are coming strong". "Reggae Respect" musically returns to the early styles of "old school reggaetón". "Quiero Bailar" ("I Want To Dance") incorporates the Liquid riddim, a musical riddim produced by the "Jamaican cross-over guru" Jeremy Harding. The song's lyrics warn her dance partner not to misinterpret her moves. In the song, she berates a lover who thinks that just because they dance she is automatically going to bed with him.

== Chart performance ==
The Best of Ivy Queen entered the Billboard Latin Albums chart at #60 in the issue week of January 7, 2006. A week later, it reached the peak position of #55. It became Ivy Queen's second album to chart on the Billboard Latin Rhythm Albums chart after Flashback (2005) reached #3 on the chart, while her following studio album, Sentimiento, (2007) reached #1 on the chart two years later. The Billboard Latin Rhythm Albums chart along with the Billboard Latin Rhythm Airplay chart were introduced after both Diva and Real were released deeming the two albums to be eligible to appear on the chart.

In terms of chart performance, Diva was a commercial success. It was her first commercially successful album, peaking at #24 on the Billboard Top Latin Albums chart. On the Billboard Top Heatseekers (South Atlantic) chart, the album peaked at #8. On the Billboard Reggae Albums chart, the album peaked at #4. On the Billboard Tropical Albums chart, the album peaked at #1, spending four non-consecutive weeks at the top with a total of 86 weeks on the chart. On the Billboard Top Latin Albums chart, Real peaked #25, one position higher than Diva. On the Reggae Albums chart, the album peaked at #4, her highest peak on the chart with Diva reaching the same position, while spending a total of 17 consecutive weeks on the chart. On the Billboard Tropical Albums chart, the album peaked at #6. Queen was unable to enter the Billboard 200 until 2007, when her sixth studio album, Sentimiento, reached #105 on the chart.

== Track listing ==
Disc 1
No.	Title	Writer(s)	Producer(s)	Length
1.	"Papi Te Quiero"	Martha Pesante	Tony "CD" Kelly, Rafi Mercenario	3:14
2.	"Dale Volumen"	Pesante	Ecko	2:25
3.	"Sangre" (featuring Mexicano 777)	Pesante, Rudolph Grant	DJ Alex	3:36
4.	"Dile"	Pesante, Eliel Osorio, Alvaro Arroyo	DJ Nelson, Noriega	3:46
5.	"Me Acostumbré"	Pesante	Noriega	2:47
6.	"Rebulera"	Pesante	Rafi Mercenario, Noriega	3:00
7.	"Mi Barrio"	Pesante	Ecko	3:08
8.	"Tuya Soy"	Pesante	DJ Adam	2:47
9.	"Chika Ideal"	Pesante	Rafi Mercenario	3:01
10.	"Ángel Caído"	Pesante	Dennis Nieves	2:21
11.	"Guillaera" (featuring Gran Omar)	Pesante, Omar Navarro	DJ Adam	4:02
12.	"Matando" (featuring Gran Omar)	Pesante, Navarro	Rafi Mercenario	2:41
13.	"Mi Sitaución"	Pesante	Rafi Mercenario	3:14
Total length:				43:36

Disc 2
No.	Title	Length
1.	"Intro — Ivy Queen" (Behind The Scenes)	1:22
2.	"Llegó La Queen" (Behind The Scenes)	3:56
3.	"The Original Rude Girl" (Behind The Scenes)	3:62
4.	"En Mi Imperio" (Behind The Scenes)	2:37
5.	"Muchos Quieren Tumbarme" (Music video)	4:48
6.	"Reggae Respect" (Music video)	2:41
7.	"In The Zone" (Music video featuring Wyclef Jean)	3:49
8.	"Quiero Saber" (Music video featuring Gran Omar)	2:53
9.	"Quiero Bailar" (Music video)	3:02
10.	"Tuya Soy" (Music video)	2:45
11.	"Guillaera" (Music video featuring Gran Omar)	4:00
12.	"Papi Te Quiero" (Music video)	3:16
13.	"Tu No Puedes" (Music video)	3:34

== Charts ==
Chart (2006)	Peak Position
US Latin Albums (Billboard)	55
US Latin Rhythm Albums (Billboard)	13
