= Dile (Ivy Queen song) =

Single by Ivy Queen

from the album Real
- Released: November 2004
- Recorded: 2004
- Genre: Reggaetón, cumbia, bachata
- Length: 3:48
- Label: Universal Latino
- Songwriters: Martha Pesante, Eliel Osorio, Alvaro Arroyo
- Producers: DJ Nelson, Noriega

Ivy Queen singles chronology
"Rociarlos" (2004)	"Dile" (2004)	"Angel Caído" (2005)

"Dile" (English: Tell Her) is a song by Puerto Rican reggaetón recording artist Ivy Queen, from her fourth studio album, Real (2004). It was composed by Queen along with Eliel Osorio and Alvaro Arroyo, produced by DJ Nelson and Noriega and released as the lead single from the album on via Airplay in November 2004. It ended 2005 within the top 40 Tropical Songs in Billboard magazine. The musical style as well as the lyrical content is very similar to the song released by Don Omar by the same name, the same year.

There is a music video associated with the song released along with two other music videos by Queen: "Dale Volumen" and "Matando" both from the album Real. The song was able to peak at number eight on the Billboard Latin Tropical Airplay chart, earning Ivy Queen a 2004 Latin Billboard Music Award nomination for "Tropical/Salsa Airplay Track, Female". The song, along with the album, was re-released in 2007 under Machete Music.

== Background ==
Following the failed commercial success of Ivy Queen's precedent two studio albums, En Mi Imperio (1997) and The Original Rude Girl (1998), she was dropped from the Sony label and took a hiatus from her musical career in 1999. The 1999 hip-hop single, "In The Zone", a duet with Haitian singer Wyclef Jean and lead single from the latter, was a moderate success in the United States. The second single "Ritmo Latino" and its parent album respectively, were overlooked by consumers and failed to chart. Subsequently, Queen appeared on reggaetón compilation albums spawning hits including "Quiero Bailar", and collaborations with artists on Tommy Boy Records and Columbia Records. In 2003, Queen released her third studio effort entitled Diva. The album was highly anticipated and acclaimed. It was recognized as a factor in reggaeton's mainstream exposure in 2004 along with Daddy Yankee's Barrio Fino and Tego Calderon's El Enemy de los Guasíbiri, after being certified Platinum by the Recording Industry Association of America.

The following year, Queen released a platinum edition to the album with extra tracks including "Papi Te Quiero" and "Tu No Puedes". She then began recording her next album. Her fourth studio album was originally planned to be Queen's debut full-length English language album after she received recording contract offerings from multiple record labels including Sony. She said it was a good opportunity to reach and take over the competitive market of English hip hop music after becoming popular in Latin American countries. Queen got the offer to record an English-language album after Sony contacted her and notified her that her albums from when she was with the label six years prior are now being heard in cities like London all because of the success of Diva. Despite her concerns over lack of English pronunciation, she continued with the project. She recorded songs with many of hip hop's biggest MCs including American rapper Fat Joe, who recorded a song in English for her debut English album in support of her. The song was later turned into "Quítate Two" and included on Real, while American hip hop producer Swizz Beatz handled production of "Soldados" showcasing her crossover appeal.

== Composition and reception ==
Ivy Queen "Dile" (2004)
A 21-second sample of "Dile" which combines reggaeton and cumbia music while saluting Colombia.

According to an editor for Rolling Stone, the album contains "raspy braggadocio and sexy rhymes" which complement Queen's raspy vocals. Queen said "I really think this album is for people to really just sit down and listen to it". She explained that "there are times that the songs will make you want to dance" but their lyrical content was more meaningful. Queen wanted the overall feeling of the album to express that she is a well–rounded artist. Furthermore, describing the songs of the album: "[they] are always going to be real because they are feelings that people have," she asserts. "The hits that I have now, the girls love them because they are real. If I am feeling hurt and need to curse to express that, then I will. I am going to be real all the way because that's what made Ivy Queen."

"Dile" was composed by Queen herself. It was produced by the Puerto Rican-born reggaetón record producer and long-time collaborator DJ Nelson. The song was released as the album's second single via Airplay in September 2004. It was included on the album, released November 16, 2004 by The Roof Top Records, Inc. a subdivision of Universal Latino. Following the release of "Chika Ideal" as the lead single which was commercially unsuccessful, "Dile" peaked at number eight on the Billboard Tropical Songs chart. According to Patricia Meschino of Miami New Times, the album features a "wide range of styles, including the lilting Colombian compas rhythms of "Dile". It combines the Latin style of vallenato with reggaetón. She noted that she sang the whole song without rapping to prove that she is a complete musician, not just a rapper. After the "explosion" of reggaetón on the west coast of the United States, Real helped Ivy Queen enter "Bay Area mainstream hip hop dials" with "Dile", "Tócame" and "Baila Así" all being "staples" on Hispanic radio stations. Following its release as a single, "Dile" has appeared on the following albums: Dancehall Nice Again 2005 (2005), Reggaeton En La Parada Puertorriqueña, Vol. 2 (2005), Reggaeton Bachatero: Non Stop (2005) remixed into bachata, The Best of Ivy Queen (2005), Power 96 Presents: Dancehall Twice As Nice (2005), Jamz TV Hits, Vol. 4 (2006), and Jamz Los Mejores Del Genero (2007).

== Accolades ==
=== Billboard Latin Music Awards ===
The Billboard Latin Music Awards are awarded annually by Billboard magazine in the United States. "Dile" received a Billboard Latin Music Award nomination for "Tropical Airplay Track of the Year, Female" at the 2004 Billboard Latin Music Awards. The song eventually lost to La India's "Seduceme". That night she was also nominated for "Reggaeton Album of the Year" for Diva: Platinum Edition and "Tropical Airplay Track of the Year, New Artist" for "Los 12 Discípulos" in which she collaborated with eleven other reggaetón artist, who were among the most requested in the genre at the time.

Year	Nominee / work	Award	Result
2004	"Dile"	Tropical/Salsa Airplay Track, Female	Nominated

== Charts ==
=== Weekly charts ===
Chart (2004)	Peak Position
US Tropical Songs (Billboard)	8

=== Year-end charts ===
Chart (2005)	Position
US Tropical Songs (Billboard)	38

== Personnel ==
Adapted from album's liner notes.

- Executive Production – Goguito "Willy" Guadalupe, Omar Navarro
- Co-Executive Production – "La Diva" Ivy Queen
- Audio Production – DJ Nelson, Noriega
- Musical Production – DJ Nelson, Noriega
- Mastering – Esteban Piñero
- Mixing – Dennis Nieves
- Engineer – Dennis Nieves
- Arranging – Dennis Nieves
- Vocals – Ivy Queen, Noriega
- Recording – Marroneo Studios in Bayamón, Puerto Rico
- Record Label – Universal Music Latino
- Representation – Goguito "Willy" Guadalupe
- Publishing – Perfect Image Music Publishing/EMI 2004
- Photography – Dr. Mannix Guillaera
- Footwear – Steve Maden from Plaza Las Américas in San Juan, Puerto Rico
- Graphic Art – MusicDesign
