= Tuya Soy =

Single by Ivy Queen

from the album Diva
- Released: 2004
- Recorded: 2003
- Genre: Reggaetón
- Length: 2:47
- Label: Universal Music Latino
- Songwriter: Martha Pesante
- Producer: DJ Adam

Ivy Queen singles chronology
"Guillaera" (2004)	"Tuya Soy" (2004)	"Tu No Puedes" (2004)

"Tuya Soy" (in English, "I'm yours") is a song by Puerto Rican recording artist Ivy Queen from her third studio album Diva (2003). It was released in mid-2004, following the releases of "Quiero Bailar", "Quiero Saber", "Papi Te Quiero", and "Guillaera" as the first four singles.

Lyrically, Ivy Queen tells the story of a woman who suspects her husband of cheating. Despite being in rotation on various Anglophone and Hispanophone radio stations in the United States, the song failed to chart in Billboard magazine.

== Background ==
Following the failed commercial success of Ivy Queen's previous two studio albums, En Mi Imperio (1997) and The Original Rude Girl (1998), she was dropped from the Sony label and took a hiatus from her musical career in 1999. The lead single from the latter, "In The Zone", a duet with Haitian singer Wyclef Jean, was a moderate success in the United States in March 1999. The subsequent single "Ritmo Latino" and its parent album, were overlooked by consumers and failed to chart. However, the album was critically acclaimed by many including an editor for Allmusic who awarded the album four out of five stars and listed it as a selected "Allmusic Pick".

In the following years, Queen began appearing on reggaetón compilation albums spawning hits such as "Quiero Bailar" from The Majestic 2 and "Quiero Saber" from Kilates. In 2003, Queen and her then-husband Gran Omar signed with Real Music, an independent record label with headquarters in Miami, Florida and established by Jorge Guadalupe and Anthony Pérez. They appeared on the label's first effort Jams Vol. 1 which Pérez released after several major labels turned him down. She benefited from Pérez producing the "important reggaetón television show" The Roof, which aired on Mun2 and detailed urban music and lifestyle by frequently appearing and performing on the show.

== Composition and controversy ==
Ivy Queen "Tuya Soy" (2004)
A 16-second sample of the fifth single from the album, "Tuya Soy", in which Ivy Queen tells the story of a woman who suspects her husband of cheating.

Diva is a mixture of "reggaetón and rap fusion". The musical styles of the recording alternated between reggaetón and hip-hop while Queen experimented with R&B and pop. One reviewer described its lyrics as "beat-happy female-empowerment anthems". This is exemplified by "Tuya Soy", whose lyrics tell the story of a woman who suspects that her husband has been unfaithful, repeating a theme on infidelity that has been prominent in Queen's lyrical content. According to the El Nuevo Herald, the song, along with "Te He Querido, Te He Llorado", "Papi Te Quiero", and "Quiero Bailar", among others, show why she is the "Queen of Reggaetón". It was included at number sixteen on El Heraldo's "list of 34 songs that make women dance".

"Tuya Soy" did not gain significant enough airplay in the United States to chart in Billboard magazine. However, it was heard on various Anglophone and Hispanophone radio stations throughout the United States, including Miami's WPOW "Rhythmic Top 40" radio station. WPOW's program director, Kid Curry, said that record labels were not servicing reggaetón singles at the time and that he received them "by word-of-mouth". The song appeared on Billboard’s Airplay monitor list for the Rhythmic Top 40 chart, under the “Chart Bound” section. Despite this, "Tuya Soy" is one of Ivy Queen's better known songs. Following its release as a single, the song has appeared on various other compilation albums, including Bailoteca, Vol. 26 (2004), Power 96 Presents: Dancehall Nice Again 2004 – Reggae & Reggaeton (2004), Pina Records All Stars, Vol. 2 (2004), Guillaera: Reggaeton Collection (2005), Queen's first compilation album The Best of Ivy Queen (2005), and Reggaeton Most Wanted, Vol. 1 (2006). DJ Super Reo remixed and covered the song on his album Reggaetón Frenzy: Lo Mejor del Perreo (2003). "Tuya Soy" was also covered by Puerto Rican singer Dlaklle on the reggaetón compilation album Reggaetón 30 Pegaditas (2005), and the Boricua Boys, on their second album, Reggaetón (2006).

== Track listing ==
No.	Title	Writer(s)	Producer(s)	Length
1.	"Tuya Soy"	Martha Pesante	DJ Adam	2:40
2.	"Guillaera" (featuring Gran Omar)	Pesante, Omar Navarro	DJ Adam	4:06
Total length:				6:46
