= Real (Ivy Queen album) =

Studio album by Ivy Queen
- Released: November 21, 2004
- Recorded: March–September 2004
- Genres: Reggaetón, hip hop
- Length: 58:03
- Labels: Universal Music Latino, Perfect Image
- Producers: Goguito "Willy" Guadalupe (exec.), Gran Omar (exec.), Ivy Queen (co-exec.), Swizz Beatz, DJ Blass, Ecko, Hyde, Rafi Mercenario, Monserrate, DJ David Montañez, DJ Nelson, Dennis Nieves, Noriega

Ivy Queen chronology
Diva (2003)	Real (2004)	Flashback (2005)

Singles from Real
- 1. "Chika Ideal" Released: May 2004; 2. "Rociarlos" Released: September 2004; 3. "Dile" Released: November 2004; 4. "Angel Caído" Released: February 2005

Real is the fourth studio album by Puerto Rican reggaetón recording artist Ivy Queen, released on November 21, 2004, by Universal Music Latino. Initially to be Queen's debut full-length English-language studio album, it featured collaborations with hip hop and fellow Latino artists Hector El Father, Fat Joe, Getto & Gastam, La India, Gran Omar and Mickey Perfecto. The album was primarily produced by Rafi Mercenario, and included guest production by American producer Swizz Beatz, Puerto Rican producers Ecko, Noriega, Monserrate and DJ Nelson. The executive producers were Goguito "Willy" Guadalupe, Gran Omar and Ivy Queen.

Real is Queen's only record with a Parental Advisory label. The album departs from her uniquely personal lyrical content and musical style which was, until this album, mainly all about detailing hood life in Puerto Rico, heartbreak, and love. It alternates musically between reggaetón and hip hop, experimenting with electronica, funk, dancehall, pop, R&B, and acoustic ballads. The wide range of styles and musical exploration earned Real mainly positive reviews from critics. Many praised Queen's raspy vocals and production quality, whilst others criticized the lack of instrumentation.

Spawning four singles ("Chika Ideal", "Rociarlos", "Dile", and "Angel Caído"), Real peaked at number twenty-five on the Billboard Top Latin Albums chart, number four on the Billboard Top Reggae Albums chart and number six on the Billboard Tropical Albums chart. "Chika Ideal" and "Rociarlos" failed to attain chart success, although the former reached the top ten of Terra Networks' music-video countdown. "Dile" peaked at number eight on the Billboard Tropical Songs chart, earning Ivy Queen three Billboard Latin Music Award nominations (including one for Tropical Airplay Track of the Year, Female). Several other tracks, including "Tócame" and "Baila Así", received airplay on both Anglophone and Hispanophone radio stations in the United States.

Real is regarded as a factor in 2004's reggaetón exposure to mainstream English-speaking markets, along with Ivy Queen's previous album (2003's Diva), as well as albums by Daddy Yankee and Tego Calderón. It became one of the best-selling albums of 2005, along with her fifth studio album, Flashback, with sales of both reportedly going "through the roof". Ivy Queen then embarked on concert tours of Latin America and the United States; she also promoted the album with a network television-news segment, detailing her career (and struggle for respect) in reggaetón, as well as by performing "Chika Ideal" on Don Francisco Presenta. The album was re-released on September 25, 2007, by Machete Music, but failed to impact the charts.

== Background ==
After the failure of Ivy Queen's first two studio albums, En Mi Imperio (1997) and The Original Rude Girl (1998), Sony Music Latin released Queen from her musical contract and she took a hiatus from her musical career in 1999. The 1999 hip-hop single "In The Zone", a duet with Haitian singer Wyclef Jean, was moderately successful in the United States. However, the album "fizzled". Over the next few years, Queen appeared on reggaetón compilation albums, spawning hits (including "Quiero Bailar") and collaborations with artists on Tommy Boy and Columbia Records. In 2003, Queen released her third studio recording, Diva, which was highly anticipated and acclaimed. It was a factor in reggaetón's mainstream exposure in 2004 (with Daddy Yankee's Barrio Fino and Tego Calderon's El Enemy de los Guasíbiri), and was certified platinum by the Recording Industry Association of America. In early 2004, after a string of compilation appearances, Queen appeared on the compilation album 12 Discípulos by Eddie Dee with "Los 12 Discípulos", "Quítate Tu Pa' Ponerme" and "Que Es La Que Hay". "Los 12 Discípulos" managed to reach number eight of the Billboard Tropical Songs chart, becoming a top ten hit. It received a nomination for "Tropical Airplay Track of the Year, New Artist" at the 2005 Billboard Latin Music Award. The song featured eleven other reggaeton musicians, who were among the most requested in the genre at the time. These included Dee along with Queen, Daddy Yankee, Tego Calderón, Julio Voltio, Vico C, Zion, Lennox, Nicky Jam, Johnny Prez, Gallego, and Wiso G. The song brought all twelve artist together as one to show that "unity is needed for the genre reggaetón to evolve and survive".

That year, Queen released a platinum edition of the album which included new songs, such as "Papi Te Quiero" and "Tu No Puedes", and began recording her next album. Queen's fourth studio album was planned to be her debut full-length English-language album after she received record-contract offers from a number of labels, including Sony. She said it was a good opportunity to reach the competitive Anglo hip hop music market after her success in Latin American countries. Queen received an offer to record an English-language album after Sony notified her that her Sony albums from six years earlier were being played in cities such as London because of Diva's success. Despite her concerns about her English pronunciation, she continued with the project. Queen recorded songs with some of hip hop's most popular MCs, including American rapper Fat Joe (who appeared on her debut English album). His song later became "Quítate Two", and was included on Real; American hip-hop producer Swizz Beatz produced "Soldados", showcasing her crossover appeal.

== Recording and production ==
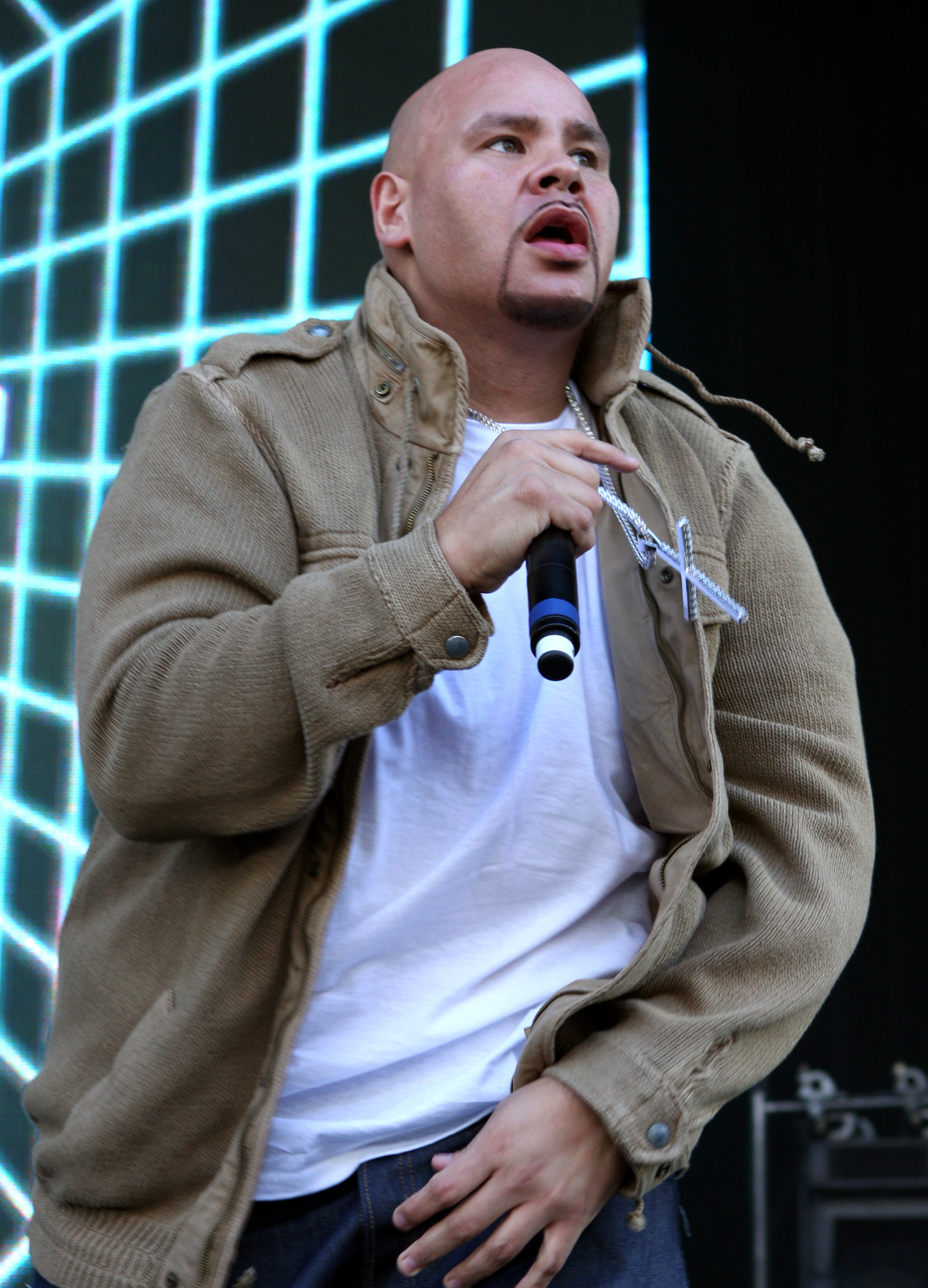
Fat Joe is featured on "Quítate Two" which he co-wrote.

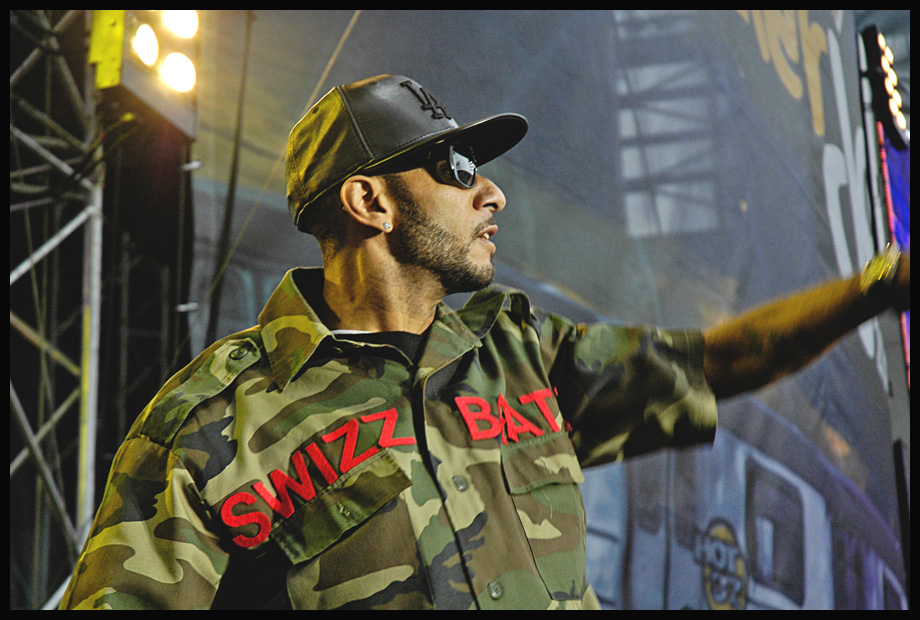
Swizz Beatz handled production and received co-writing credits for "Soldados".

After the success of Diva: Platinum Edition, Ivy Queen began recording her fourth studio album in March 2004; it wrapped up in September at Marroneo Studios in Bayamón, Puerto Rico. The album was mastered and arranged by Esteban Piñero; Dennis Nieves did the mixing and served as engineer.

Production was divided among several hip-hop and reggaetón producers. Swizz Beatz produced "Soldados"; longtime collaborator DJ Nelson reappeared with "Dile" (the lead single) and "Acércate". Grammy Award-winning Latin music producers Echo and Diesel, Hyde, Gran Omar, Noriega, Monserrate, Dennis Nieves, DJ Blass and DJ David Montañez also aided in production and Rafi Mercenario produced seven of the album's nineteen tracks. Queen and Omar were executive producers.

Collaborations include "Matando", "Rociarlos" (also featuring Hector El Father) and "Baila Así" with Queen's then-husband, Gran Omar; a hip-hop track, "Quítate Two", with Fat Joe; "Acércate" with Mikey Perfecto, "Tócame" with salsa singer La India and "Vas A Morir" with Puerto Rican duo Getto & Gastam. "Soldados" and "Dee Jay" were co-written with Kasseem Dean and Omar Navarro, respectively. "People thought we were going to make a salsa track", Queen said about the collaboration with La India, noting that the song was a dancehall track (not salsa or reggaetón). She added that India was "original" and she worked well with people who are genuine, explaining the other collaborations. According to Navarro and Queen in a 2004 interview on mun2 The Roof, the album was expected to feature a duet with Puerto Rican singer Don Omar. Spin saw Queen's collaboration with Fat Joe as a trend in reggaetón to have American rappers "team up with its stars".

== Music and lyrics ==
Ivy Queen, "Soldados" (2004)
A 20–second sample of the electronically-infused "Soldados", produced by Swizz Beatz.

Ivy Queen, "Rebulera" (2004)
An 18–second sample of "Rebulera", featuring a repetitive chorus with the line "Vamo a toa" by an uncredited female voice.

Ivy Queen, "Ángel Caído" (2004)
A 12–second sample of the additional version of "Ángel Caído", an acoustic-guitar ballad

According to Rolling Stone, the album contains "raspy braggadocio and sexy rhymes" which complement Queen's raspy vocals. It alternates between reggaetón and hip hop as Queen experiments with Caribbean music, R&B, pop, electronica, funk, dancehall and acoustic ballads: "I really think this album is for people to really just sit down and listen to it". She explained that "there are times that the songs will make you want to dance", but their lyrics are more meaningful. Although Queen said the album has its share of "battles against men", she wants it to demonstrate that she is a well–rounded artist. Describing the songs, she said "[they] are always going to be real because they are feelings that people have...The hits that I have now, the girls love them because they are real. If I am feeling hurt and need to curse to express that, then I will. I am going to be real all the way because that's what made Ivy Queen".

The introduction to the album features Queen lyrically blessing and thanking her audience for the support. "Chika Ideal" ("Ideal Girl") assures the protagonist's lover that she wants to be with him and fulfill his dreams. "Soldados" ("Soldiers"), a hip-hop track influenced by electronic music, was produced by Swizz Beatz. "Matando" ("Killing"), a duet with Gran Omar, explores dancing in a club. The song, in a minor key, features the synthetic instrumentation of techno music. "Dale Volumen" ("Add Volume"), in a minor key, is characterized by simple harmonic progressions, synthesizers and stick-drum percussion and influenced by reggae and Afro-Latin music. It features a techno-influenced beat. "Dile" ("Tell Her") features lilting rhythms from Colombia (including cumbia), combining Latin vallenato with reggaetón. Queen noted that she sang the song without rapping to prove she is a complete musician and not just a rapper. "Mi Barrio" ("My Hood") criticizes "the problems present in Añasco, Puerto Rico". Queen compared the song to "Corazones" by Daddy Yankee from his album, Barrio Fino. "Dee Jay" is a reggaetón number which "recognizes the DJs" of reggaetón. In it, Queen mentions DJ Nelson, Noriega, DJ Adam, DJ Negro, DJ Baby, Rafi Mercenario, Luny Tunes, Monserrate & DJ Urba and others. "Quítate Two" ("Remove Yourself"), with Fat Joe, combines hip-hop and funk music. The acoustic guitar ballad "Ángel Caído" ("Fallen Angel") and its acoustic version are the fourteenth and nineteenth tracks on the album, respectively. "Tócame" "("Touch Me"), a dancehall track, features La India. In a minor key, "Rebulera", another minor-key song, has Queen asserting that she is "queen" in the genre of reggaetón. The track features synthesizers and strings, and is influenced by reggae and Afro-Latin music. "Baila Así" ("Dance Like That"), produced by Gran Omar, has a Punjabi–influenced hip-hop beat.

== Release and promotion ==
Ivy Queen, "Chika Ideal" (2004)
An 18-second sample of the lead single from Real, "Chika Ideal", which Ivy Queen performed on Don Francisco Presenta to promote the album

Real was released on November 16, 2004, after originally being scheduled for release in September and on November 26. The album was also released in a censored version. In March 2005, an LP entitled Real Streets was released. Its track listing included "Dile", "Soldados", Quitate Two", "Matando", "Baila Asi", "Chika Ideal", "Rebulera", and "Mi Barrio". Real was later re-issued on September 25, 2007, by Machete Music, after having been announced in July 2007 as a fourth-quarter release. This was a result of Ivy Queen's success with her seventh studio album, Sentimiento, which sold 9,000 copies in its first week and was certified platinum within two months of release. Ivy Queen appeared on Don Francisco Presenta, where she performed "Chika Ideal" (the first single from Real) to promote the album. "Rociarlos" was released as the second single, and "Dile" was released as the third (and final) single later in 2004 after the album's release. Music videos for both singles were also released, along with music videos for "Dale Volumen" and "Matando". Queen performed on the Reggaeton Tour 2004, also featuring Aldo Ranks and La Factoria, in a number of South American countries (including Ecuador); she sang "Papi Te Quiero" and "Tu No Puedes", promoting Diva and Real.

The inside front cover of the album included graffiti, earning "street cred" in the U.S.-centered hip-hop world.

This was her first tour in South America, following shows in Atlanta and New York City (where she was "designated as the Puerto Rico Youth God Mother of the National Puerto Rican Day Parade" in June 2004). At the end of June 2004 Queen appeared on a network-television-news segment, detailing her career and struggle for respect in reggaetón, during recording sessions for the album. In February 2005 Queen appeared at the Festival of Puerto Rican Stars—an historic achievement for reggaetón, since no other performer from the genre was invited. In June 2005 Queen appeared on the Invasion Del Reggaetón Tour with Daddy Yankee, which grossed $817,220 for the week of June 18. She also attended (and performed at) the Billboard Bash the night before the 2005 Billboard Latin Music Awards.

Unlike Queen's previous albums, the artwork for Real features provocative photography; her middle and thighs are emphasized to create a sexy image. Queen said her breasts were enlarged from a B to a C cup, adding that the packaging described the style of music on the album. The album cover also features Queen's signature long nails, which she sports in a variety of colors. Incorporating graffiti, the album has "street cred" in the U.S.-centered hip-hop world. The change in image for Queen is attributed to Universal Latino's feeling that Real had crossover potential for U.S. mainstream audiences. The album's title suggests this; it means "real" in English and Spanish and "royal" in Spanish, hinting at Queen's status as the Queen of Reggaetón. It is also Queen's response to Puerto Rican criticism for looking like a tomboy, wearing baggy pants and large shirts (which she addresses in her autobiography, Detrás Del Glamour [Behind the Glamour]). She accepted responsibility for her change in image, attributing it to a "new growth in person" and admitting that the makeover stemmed from a "crisis" and "female vanity". To change her figure, Queen used a Colombian plastic surgeon.

== Commercial performance ==
The album was moderately commercially successful. On the Billboard Top Latin Albums chart, Real debuted at number twenty-nine and peaked at number twenty-five, one position lower than Diva's peak at twenty-four. It ended its chart run at number sixty-nine on February 26, 2005. On the Reggae Albums chart the album debuted at number four, sharing its peak with Diva and spending seventeen consecutive weeks on the chart. On the Billboard Tropical Albums chart, the album debuted (and peaked) at number six, failing to match Diva's peak position at the top. It fell off the chart after being number eighteen for the week of April 9, 2005. At the time Diva was still on the countdown at number twenty, to be displaced two weeks later by Marc Anthony's 2004 Valio La Pena. In 2005, the album managed to peak at number nineteen on the Billboard Latin Rhythm Albums chart. Sales were boosted by "distribution by Universal Music & Video Distribution, coupled with strong airplay at English- and Spanish-language stations". Queen did not enter the Billboard 200 until 2007, when her sixth studio album (Sentimiento) reached number 105 on the chart. "Dile" was the only commercially successful of the four singles, reaching number eight on the Billboard Tropical Songs chart. After the reggaetón "explosion" on the west coast of the United States, Real helped Ivy Queen enter "Bay Area mainstream hip hop dials" with "Dile", "Tócame" and "Baila Así" "staples" on Hispanic radio stations.

== Critical reception ==
Professional ratings
Review scores
Source	Rating
Los Angeles Times	(negative)
Miami New Times	(positive)
Rolling Stone	3/5 stars
Reggaetonline	4/5 stars

Rolling Stone gave Real three out of five stars, complimenting the "combo of raspy braggadocio and sexy rhymes" and noting the "pop-savvy" nature of the LP. According to Patricia Meschino of Miami New Times, the album features a "wide range of styles, including the lilting Haitian compas rhythms of 'Dile' ('Tell Her'), the bhangra–flavored 'Baila Asi' ('Dance Like This'), the acoustic guitar ballad 'Ángel Caído' ('Fallen Angel') and 'Tocame' ('Caress Me'), all of which are adapted to Ivy Queen's 'confident, raspy vocals'". The latter track was labeled "spicy". Meschino also noted the exploration of hip-hop and dancehall rhythms set to "rough and rugged fast-paced raps". She ended her review by saying that it was "the audacious musical explorations that make Real a surprisingly nuanced and ultimately satisfying release". Music journalist Rafer Guzman of Newsday complimented the "electro-crunch of 'Soldados'" and "snaky funk of 'Quítate Tu'". Leila Cobo of Billboard said the album was "highly anticipated" after the release of Diva: Platinum Edition several months earlier, with over 100,000 copies sold. The album was considered a factor in reggaetón's mainstream exposure to American and global audiences. Agustin Gurza of the Los Angeles Times criticized the album, claiming "[it] lacks real instruments," calling it bawdy and indecent. An editor for Bulb Magazine selected the album as one of reggaetón's most classic albums in 2007. The music magazine XLR8R put the album at number two on its "Five Important Reggaetón Albums" list behind Don Omar's The Last Don (2003) and before Tego Calderon's El Abayarde (2003), Nicky Jam's Vida Escante (2002) and Zion & Lennox's Motivando a la Yal (2004). While reviewing the reggaetón compilation album Jamz TV Hits, Vol. 3, an editor for Allmusic listed "Chika Ideal" as an "Allmusic Pick". The song was selected as a hit from "The Golden Era of Reggaetón" (2003–2007) by Jesus Trivino of Latina magazine. Terra Networks called the music video for "Chika Ideal" one of the hottest of the summer, saying the song showed "why she is the queen of reggaetón". The video reached the Top 10 for four consecutive weeks on Terra Networks' Top Music Video countdown.

"Dile" received a Billboard Latin Music Award nomination for Tropical Airplay Track of the Year, Female at the 2005 Billboard Latin Music Awards, where Queen was also nominated for Reggaeton Album of the Year and Tropical Airplay Track of the Year, New Artist. Echo and Diesel received a Latin Grammy Award for their production work on Real. At Telemundo's El Premio De La Gente Latin Music Awards of 2005, the album was nominated for Urban or Duranguense Album of the Year — Male or Female, where Queen was also nominated for Urban or Duranguense Artist of the Year — Male or Female.

== Track listing ==
Standard edition

No.	Title	Writer(s)	Producer(s)	Length
1.	"Intro"	Martha Pesante, Armando Rosario, Paul Irizarry	Diesel	1:42
2.	"Chika Ideal"	Pesante	Rafi Mercenario	3:01
3.	"Soldados"	Pesante, Kasseem Dean	Swizz Beatz	3:13
4.	"Matando" (featuring Gran Omar)	Pesante, Omar Navarro	Rafi Mercenario, Monserrate & DJ Urba	2:41
5.	"Dale Volumen"	Pesante, Rosario, Irizarry, Navarro	Ecko	2:25
6.	"Rociarlos" (featuring Héctor "El Father" and Gran Omar)	Pesante, Navarro, Héctor Delgado	Rafi Mercenario	3:31
7.	"Dile"	Pesante, Eliel Osorio, Alvaro Arroyo	DJ Nelson, Noriega	3:46
8.	"Mi Barrio"	Pesante, Irizarry	Ecko	3:08
9.	"Entiende"	Pesante, Vladmir Felix	DJ Blass	3:13
10.	"Dee Jay"	Pesante, Navarro	Rafi Mercenario	3:30
11.	"Quítate Two" (featuring Fat Joe)	Pesante, Rosario, Irizarry, Joseph Cartagena	Ecko	2:52
12.	"Mi Situación"	Pesante	Rafi Mercenario	3:14
13.	"Acércate" (featuring Mikey Perfecto)	Pesante, Navarro, Mikey Perfecto	DJ Nelson	3:01
14.	"Ángel Caído"	Pesante	Swizz Beatz	2:21
15.	"Tócame" (featuring La India)	Pesante, Rosario, Irizarry, Linda Caballero	Diesel	3:38
16.	"Baila Así" (featuring Gran Omar)	Pesante, Navarro, Rosario, Irizarry	Gran Omar	2:48
17.	"Vas A Morir" (featuring Getto & Gastam)	Pesante, Rosario, Irizarry, Vicente Gaztambide, Raul Lozada	Ecko, Diesel	4:13
18.	"Rebulera"	Pesante	Rafi Mercenario, Noriega	3:00
19.	"Ángel Caído" (Acoustic Version)	Pesante	Swizz Beatz	2:26
Total length:				57:43

2007 reissue
No.	Title	Writer(s)	Producer(s)	Length
1.	"Intro"	Martha Pesante, Armando Rosario, Paul Irizarry	Diesel	1:42
2.	"Chika Ideal"	Pesante	Rafi Mercenario	3:01
3.	"Soldados"	Pesante	Swizz Beatz	3:13
4.	"Matando" (featuring Gran Omar)	Pesante, Omar Navarro	Rafi Mercenario, Monserrate & DJ Urba	2:41
5.	"Dale Volumen"	Pesante, Rosario, Irizarry, Navarro	Ecko	2:25
6.	"Rociarlos" (featuring Héctor "El Father" and Gran Omar)	Pesante, Navarro, Héctor Delgado	Rafi Mercenario	3:31
7.	"Dile"	Pesante, Eliel Osorio, Alvaro Arroyo	DJ Nelson, Noriega	3:46
8.	"Mi Barrio"	Pesante	Ecko	3:08
9.	"Entiende"	Pesante, Vladmir Felix	DJ Blass	3:13
10.	"Dee Jay"	Pesante	Rafi Mercenario	3:30
11.	"Quítate Two" (featuring Fat Joe)	Pesante, Joseph Cartagena	Ecko	2:52
12.	"Mi Situación"	Pesante	Rafi Mercenario	3:14
13.	"Acércate" (featuring Mikey Perfecto)	Pesante, Mikey Perfecto	DJ Nelson	3:26
14.	"Ángel Caído"	Pesante	Dennis Nieves	2:21
15.	"Tócame" (featuring La India)	Pesante, Linda Caballero	Diesel	3:38
16.	"Baila Así" (featuring Gran Omar)	Pesante, Navarro	Gran Omar	2:48
17.	"Vas A Morir" (featuring Getto & Gastam)	Pesante, Vicente Gaztambide, Raul Lozada	Ecko, Diesel	4:13
18.	"Rebulera"	Pesante	Rafi Mercenario, Noriega	3:00
19.	"Ángel Caído" (Acoustic Version)	Pesante	Dennis Nieves	2:26
Total length:				58:10

=== Notes ===
- "Acércate" is twenty-five seconds longer on the 2007 reissue of the album.
- "Quítate Two" samples "In Da Club" by 50 Cent.

== Personnel ==
Adapted from liner notes:

=== Track credits ===
"Intro" (BMI)

- Ivy Queen — lyrics
- Armando Rosario — lyrics
- Paul Irizarry — lyrics
- Diesel — musical producer
- Hyde — mixing engineer, recording engineer
- Lab Studio — recording location
- Omar Navarro — producer
- DJ David Montañez — guitar, scratching

"Chika Ideal" (BMI)

- Ivy Queen — lyrics
- Rafi Mercenario — musical producer, mixing engineer, recording engineer
- Marroneo Studios — recording location
- Omar Navarro — producer

"Soldados" (BMI)

- Ivy Queen —lyrics
- Swizz Beatz — musical producer
- Dennis Nieves — mixing engineer, recording engineer
- Omar Navarro — producer

"Matando" (featuring Gran Omar) (BMI)

- Ivy Queen — lyrics
- Rafi Mercenario — musical producer, mixing engineer, recording engineer
- Marroneo Studios — recording location
- Omar Navarro — producer, lyrics

"Dale Volumen" (BMI)

- Ivy Queen — lyrics
- Armando Rosario — lyrics
- Paul Irizarry — lyrics
- Ecko — musical producer
- Hyde — mixing engineer, recording engineer
- Lab Studio — recording location
- Omar Navarro — producer

"Rociarlos" (featuring Hector "El Father" and Gran Omar) (BMI)

- Ivy Queen — lyrics
- Hector "El Father" — lyrics
- Rafi Mercenario — musical producer, mixing engineer, recording engineer
- Marroneo Studios — recording location
- Omar Navarro — producer, lyrics

"Dile" (BMI)

- Ivy Queen — lyrics
- DJ Nelson — musical producer, mixing engineer, recording engineer
- Flow Music Studios — recording location
- Omar Navarro — producer

"Mi Barrio" (BMI)

- Ivy Queen — lyrics
- Ecko — musical producer
- Hyde — mixing engineer, recording engineer
- Lab Studio — recording location
- Omar Navarro — producer

"Entiende" (BMI)

- Ivy Queen — lyrics
- DJ Blass — musical producer
- Omar Navarro — producer

"Dee Jay" (BMI)

- Ivy Queen — lyrics
- Rafi Mercenario — musical producer, mixing engineer, recording engineer
- Marroneo Studios — recording location
- Omar Navarro — producer, lyrics

"Quítate Two" (featuring Fat Joe) (BMI)

- Ivy Queen — lyrics
- Armando Rosario — lyrics
- Paul Irizarry — lyrics
- Fat Joe — lyrics, featured artist
- Diesel — musical producer
- Ecko — musical producer
- Hyde — mixing engineer, recording engineer
- Lab Studio — recording location
- Omar Navarro — producer

"Mi Situación" (BMI)

- Ivy Queen — lyrics
- Rafi Mercenario — musical producer, mixing engineer, recording engineer
- Marroneo Studios — recording location
- Omar Navarro — producer

"Acércate" (featuring Mickey Perfecto) (BMI)

- Ivy Queen — lyrics
- Mickey Perfecto — lyrics
- DJ Nelson — musical producer
- Santana — musical producer
- Noriega — mixing engineer, recording engineer
- Flow Music Studios — recording location
- Omar Navarro — producer

"Ángel Caído" (BMI)

- Ivy Queen —lyrics
- Swizz Beatz — musical producer
- Dennis Nieves — mixing engineer, recording engineer
- Omar Navarro — producer

"Tócame" (BMI)

- Ivy Queen — lyrics
- La India — lyrics, featured artist
- Diesel — musical producer
- Ecko — musical producer
- Hyde — mixing engineer, recording engineer
- Lab Studio — recording location
- Omar Navarro — producer, lyrics
- Abrante — drums

"Baila Así" (featuring Gran Omar) (BMI)

- Ivy Queen —lyrics
- Omar Navarro — producer, lyrics

"Vas A Morir" (featuring Getto & Gastam) (BMI)

- Ivy Queen — lyrics
- Armando Rosario — lyrics
- Paul Irizarry — lyrics
- Getto & Gastam — lyrics, featured artist
- Diesel — musical producer
- Hyde — mixing engineer, recording engineer
- Lab Studio — recording location
- Omar Navarro — producer

"Ángel Caído" (Acoustic Version) (BMI)

- Ivy Queen —lyrics
- Swizz Beatz — musical producer
- Dennis Nieves — mixing engineer, recording engineer
- Omar Navarro — producer
- DJ David Montañez — guitar, scratching

"Acércate" — 2007 Version (featuring Mickey Perfecto) (IQ Publishing/BMI)

- Ivy Queen — lyrics
- Mickey Perfecto — lyrics
- DJ Nelson — musical producer
- Santana — musical producer
- Noriega — mixing engineer, recording engineer
- Flow Music Studios — recording location
- Omar Navarro — producer

=== Guest credits ===
- Gran Omar is featured courtesy of Perfect Image Records.
- Swizz Beatz is courtesy of Atlantic Records.
- Hector "El Bambino" is featured courtesy of Gold Star Music.
- Fat Joe is featured courtesy of Atlantic Records.
- Mickey Perfecto is featured courtesy of Sony BMG.
- La India is featured courtesy of Univision Records.
- Getto & Gastam are featured courtesy of Sony BMG.

=== Technical credits ===
- Executive Production – Goguito "Willy" Guadalupe, Omar Navarro
- Co-Executive Production – "La Diva" Ivy Queen
- Audio Production – Rafi Mercenario, Swizz Beatz, Noriega, DJ Nelson
- Musical Production – Rafi Mercenario, Ecko, DJ Nelson, Noriega, Swizz Beatz, Santana, Dennis Nieves, Diesel, DJ Blass, DJ David Montañez, Gran Omar
- Mastering – Esteban Piñero
- Mixing – Dennis Nieves
- Engineer – Dennis Nieves
- Arranging – Dennis Nieves
- Scratching – DJ David Montañez
- Guest Artist – Hector "El Father", Gran Omar, Fat Joe, Mikey Perfecto, La India, Getto & Gastam
- Vocals – Ivy Queen (all tracks), Noriega (tracks 7, 18)
- Recording – Marroneo Studios in Bayamón, Puerto Rico
- Record Label – Universal Music Latino
- Representation – Goguito "Willy" Guadalupe
- Publishing – Perfect Image Music Publishing/EMI 2004
- Photography – Dr. Mannix Guillaera
- Footwear – Steve Madden, Ltd. from Plaza Las Américas in San Juan, Puerto Rico
- Graphic Art – MusicDesign

== Charts ==
=== Weekly charts ===
Chart (2004)	Peak Position
US Top Latin Albums (Billboard)	25
US Tropical Albums (Billboard)	6
US Reggae Albums (Billboard)	4

Chart (2005)	Peak Position
US Latin Rhythm Albums (Billboard)	19

=== Year-end charts ===
Chart (2005)	Position
US Tropical Albums (Billboard)	17

== Release history ==
List of release dates, showing region, formats and labels
Region	Date	Format	Label
Canada	November 16, 2004	Import	Universal Latino · Perfect Image
Mexico	November 16, 2004	CD · Digital download	Universal Latino · Perfect Image
Spain	November 16, 2004	CD · Digital download	Universal Latino · Perfect Image
Argentina	November 16, 2004	CD · Digital download	Universal Latino · Perfect Image
Chile	November 16, 2004	CD · Digital download	Universal Latino · Perfect Image
Colombia	November 16, 2004	CD · Digital download	Universal Latino · Perfect Image
United Kingdom	November 16, 2004	CD · Digital download	Universal Latino · Perfect Image
United States	November 16, 2004	CD · Digital download	Universal Latino · Perfect Image
Brazil	November 16, 2004	CD · Digital download	Universal Latino · Perfect Image
Israel	November 16, 2004	CD · Digital download	Universal Latino · Perfect Image
Ireland	November 16, 2004	CD · Digital download	Universal Latino · Perfect Image
United States	September 25, 2007	CD	Machete Music
