= Dile =

Dile may refer to:

- Dile (automobile), an American automobile manufactured in Reading, Pennsylvania
- "Dile" (Don Omar song), 2004
- "Dile" (Ivy Queen song), 2004
- "Dile" (Lynda song), 1997
- "Dile", a 2019 song by Akon from El Negreeto
- Drug-induced lupus erythematosus
