= 787 (song) =

Single by Ivy Queen

Single by Ivy Queen
- Released: June 6, 2019
- Studio: in Miami
- Genre: Reggaetón
- Length: 3:54
- Label: NKS Music
- Songwriters: Martha Pesante Rodríguez, Xavier Sanchez, Jorge Erazo, Chaz Mishan, Jonathan Callender, Johan Errami, Mike Molina
- Producers: Jorgie Milliano, Chaz Mishan

Ivy Queen singles chronology
"Yo Quiero Bailar" (2019)	"787" (2019)	"La Roca" (2019)

"787" is a song by Puerto Rican singer-songwriter Ivy Queen. The song was written as a love-letter to Puerto Rico and the island’s countless famous musicians, a globally-recognized phenomenon which goes back to the country’s very earliest days.

"787" features vocals by Ivy Queen, with harmonies and backing vocals by fellow artists Jowell, Zion & Lennox. The song was written as a tribute by Ivy Queen, predominantly, along with her longtime collaborator, Xavier Sanchez, and producers Jorgie Milliano and Chaz Mishan. The song was officially released as a single on June 6, 2019.

The song peaked at #41 on the Billboard Latin Airplay chart and #23 on the Billboard Latin Rhythm Airplay chart.

== Composition ==
As an homage to the genre, ”787” mentions (by title) and interpolates several famous reggaetón songs, including:

- "Amor Mío" by Eddie Dee
- "Bendición Mami" by Mexicano 777
- "Calla" by Vico C
- "Dame un Kiss" by Franco "El Gorila"
- "Dile" by Don Omar
- "El Teléfono" by Hector "El Father" and Wisin & Yandel
- "Eso Ehh..!!!" by Alexis & Fido
- "Gasolina" by Daddy Yankee
- "La Batidora" by Yaga & Mackie and Don Omar
- "Mi Cama Huele a Ti" by Tito "El Bambino" and Zion & Lennox
- "Pa’Que Retozen" by Tego Calderón
- "Pegate a la Pared" by Yandel
- "Pide un Deseo" by Baby Rasta & Gringo
- "Punto 40" by Baby Rasta & Gringo
- "Soy Una Gargola" by Arcángel and Randy
- "Zun Da Da" by Zion

According to Jennifer Mota for the Spanish-language magazine People en Español, Queen pays homage by referencing songs and lyrics performed by her male peers within the genre of reggaeton. According to Mota, the song is from a woman's perspective. Billboard magazine's Jessica Roiz called "787" an "infectious song" that "pays homage to old-school reggaeton." Roiz noted the sampling of early 2000s reggaeton songs in 2019 becoming a trend. The title refers to area code 787, which is assigned to telephone numbers in Puerto Rico.

== Release and promotion ==
A behind-the-scenes video detailing the making of the song was filmed in Barcelona, Spain. It was posted on YouTube on June 14, 2019, and has obtained over 280,000 views as of April 2022.

== Commercial performance ==
For the week of July 13, 2019, "787" debuted at number twenty-four on the Billboard Latin Rhythm Airplay chart. The following week of July 20, 2019, the song rose one position to number twenty-three. It spent two more weeks, the weeks of July 27, 2019 and August 3, 2019, at this position. One week after debuting on the Latin Rhythm Airplay chart, the week of July 20, 2019, the song debuted at number forty-nine on the Billboard Latin Airplay chart. It spent a second week at number forty-nine, the week of July 27, 2019. In its third week, the week of August 3, 2019, the song rose eight positions to number forty-one.

== Chart performance ==
Chart (2019)	Peak Position
US Latin Airplay (Billboard)	41
US Latin Rhythm Airplay (Billboard)	23
