= Diva (Ivy Queen album) =

Studio album by Ivy Queen
- Released: August 3, 2003
- Recorded: 2000–2003
- Genres: Reggaetón, hip hop
- Length: 52:57
- Label: Real Music Group
- Producers: Ivy Queen (exec.), Luny Tunes, DJ Nelson, Noriega, Iván Joy, Omar Navarro, Carlos Berríos, DJ Adam, DJ Alex, DJ Eric, DJ Joel, Rafi Mercenario, Tony "CD" Kelly, Octopus

Ivy Queen chronology
The Original Rude Girl (1998)	Diva (2003)	Real (2004)

Singles from Diva
- 1. "Quiero Bailar" Released: August 2003; 2. "Quiero Saber" Released: January 2004; 3. "Papi Te Quiero" Released: January 2004; 4. "Guillaera" Released: 2004; 5. "Tuya Soy" Released: 2004; 6. "Tu No Puedes" Released: 2005; 7. "Súbelo" Released: 2005

Diva is the third studio album by Puerto Rican reggaetón recording artist Ivy Queen. It was released on August 23, 2003 and independently distributed by Real Music Group after being dropped from Sony Discos. The recording followed her two previous studio albums which were commercially unsuccessful and a hiatus from her musical career beginning in 1999. It featured collaborations with Latin hip hop artists including Mexicano 777, Bimbo and K-7 while the album's production was handled by a variety of musical producers; Luny Tunes, DJ Nelson, Noriega, and Iván Joy were enlisted, while DJ Adam produced a majority of the tracks. Lyrically, the album explored female empowerment, infidelity, heartbreak and love with "a veritable compendium of her artistic passion, femininity, and culture". The musical styles of the recording alternate between reggaetón and hip-hop while Queen experiments with R&B, dancehall, and pop balladry.

Diva spawned a total of seven singles: "Quiero Bailar", "Quiero Saber", "Papi Te Quiero", "Guillaera", "Tuya Soy", "Tu No Puedes", and "Súbelo", which were released over the course of three years. "Quiero Bailar" became a commercial success and her first big hit in the United States and Puerto Rico.

Highly anticipated and acclaimed, Diva peaked at number twenty-four on the Billboard Top Latin Albums chart, number eight on the Billboard Top Heatseekers chart for the South Atlantic area, number four on the Billboard Reggae Albums and number one on the Billboard Tropical Albums chart. The album lead the latter chart for four non-consecutive weeks in 2004, becoming the eighth best-selling Tropical Album of 2004; making Queen the eighth best-selling Tropical Artist of that year. The album has been recognized as a "door-opener" for reggaetón's mainstream exposure in 2004-2005.

== Background ==
After the failed commercial attempts of Ivy Queen's first two studio albums, En Mi Imperio (1997) and The Original Rude Girl (1998), she was dropped from the Sony label and took a hiatus from her musical career in 1999. The 1999 single, "In The Zone", a duet with Haitian singer Wyclef Jean, was a moderate success in the United States. The following single "Ritmo Latino" and its parent album, were overlooked by consumers and failed to chart. However, The Original Rude Girl was critically acclaimed by many including an editor for Allmusic who awarded the album four out of five stars and listed it as a selected "Allmusic Pick". This occurred after she left Sony and stepped out of Wyclef Jean's shadow.

In 2001 and 2002, Queen began appearing on reggaetón compilation albums spawning hits like "Quiero Bailar" from The Majestic 2 and "Quiero Saber" from Kilates. In 2003, Queen and her then-husband Gran Omar signed with Real Music, an independent label based in Miami, Florida and established by Jorge Guadalupe and Anthony Pérez. They appeared on the label's first album Jams Vol. 1 which Pérez released after several major record labels turned him down. She benefited from Pérez producing the "important reggaetón television show" The Roof, which aired on Mun2 and detailed urban music and lifestyle by frequently appearing and performing on the show.

== Recording and production ==
Recording sessions for the album began in 2000 and ended in 2003 in various recording studios. Queen recorded at After Dark Studios in Cartersville, Georgia; Boricua Music Studios in Bridgeport, Connecticut; Flow Music Studios in San Juan, Puerto Rico; Imperio Music Studios in the Bronx, New York; Los Angeles Recording in California; The Lab Studios and Mad Jim Studios. Production of the album were handled by a variety of musical producers. Queen's principal songwriter for her previous albums, DJ Nelson, produced the track "Quiero Saber". Luny Tunes, Noriega, Iván Joy, Ecko, DJ Alex, DJ Eric, Rafi Mercenario, Tony "CD" Kelly and Omar Navarro also contribute to musical production while DJ Adam produced eight of the fifteen tracks. Collaborations on the album include "Guillaera", "Money Making", which also features rapper Japanese, the remix of "Babe" and "Quiero Saber" with her then-husband Gran Omar; "Sangre" with Mexicano 777; "Bounce" with Bimbo; and "Dile Que Ya" with K-7.

== Release and promotion ==
The recording was released on August 19, 2003 and independently distributed by Real Music Group. On January 27, 2004, Diva: Platinum Edition was released with remixes to songs on the standard edition. These include "Papi Te Quiero", an English remix of "Papi Te Quiero", a reggaetón remix of "Tu No Puedes", "Quiero Saber" and "Quiero Bailar". It was released in the United Kingdom on February 3, 2004. In August 2003, Queen appeared at the first Reggaetón Superfest, which drew a crowd of 12,000 at Madison Square Garden. Queen embarked on a worldwide tour, the Reggaeton Tour 2004 in support for Diva. On one of the legs in Ecuador, she performed "Papi Te Quiero" and "Tu No Puedes", which was her first South American tour. This followed presentations in Atlanta, Brooklyn and New York City where she was "designated as the Puerto Rico Youth God Mother of the National Puerto Rican Day Parade" in June 2004. She often refers to herself as "la perra" (bitch) and "la potra" {(mare); the latter "points to her calls of female sexual agency," as this is similar to the metaphor "black stallion" for phallic potency. Queen desired to name the album La Potra, however, Universal Music Latino would not sign off on the title as they considered it to be too threatening.

== Composition ==
Ivy Queen "Intro - Diva" (2003)
A 10-second sample of "Intro - Diva" in which Queen uses metaphors of a boxing match to assert herself as the Queen of Latin hip hop and reggaetón music.

Ivy Queen "Tuya Soy" (2004)
A 16-second sample of the fifth single from the album, "Tuya Soy", in which Ivy Queen tells the story of a woman who suspects her husband of cheating.

Ivy Queen "Dile Que Ya" (2004)
A 21-second sample of "Dile Que Ya", a hip-hop ballad in which Ivy Queen duets with K-7.

Diva is a mixture of "reggaetón and rap fusion". The musical styles of the recording alternated between reggaetón and hip-hop while Queen experimented with R&B, pop, and tropical music genres. Its lyrics feature "beat-happy female-empowerment anthems". The introductory to the album asserts herself as the "queen", using the metaphor of a boxing match, with phrases like "one more round", in which she uses to "express her role as the queen and diva of reggaetón". Making the connection of the sport of boxing to reggaetón, which are both a male-dominated arena; Queen "alludes to her previous video for "Muchos Quieren Tumbarme" (Many Want To Knock Me Down) in which she takes the role of a female boxer, while also referring to women's power as underestimated.

"Guillaera" (Attitude), a duet with Gran Omar, explains what type of man she does and does not desire. According to Kalefa Sanneh of The New York Times, "Drama" sets her "rapid-fire monologue atop a sublime, head-nodding hip-hop beat." On "Tuya Soy", (I'm Yours) she explains "the story of woman who suspects her husband of infidelity", a controversial theme which has been prominent in Queen's lyrical content. "Bésame", (Kiss Me) is an evocative theme, expressing the need to go to the dance floor with the guy she like. "Me Acostumbré" (I Got Accustomed) and "Dile Que Ya" (Tell Him Okay) are "hip-hop ballads". "Alerta" (Alert) features "choppy rhythms, handclaps, and vaguely nefarious horns, plus an ingratiating synth line played by a one-fingered android".

"Venganza", (Vengeance) speaks up against the mistreatment of women, which embodies what Queen represents within her musical compositions. The mid-tempo, "bubble-gum pop" "Papi Te Quiero" (Daddy I Love You), named one of the album's biggest hits, "pairs a straightforward love song with the well known reggae riddim Buyout." Ramiro Burr of Billboard stated "Papi Te Quiero" showcases how "effortlessly and quickly she alternately sings and raps, claiming that she has a distinct vocal style that evokes Gwen Stefani". Although, the literal translation of "Papi Te Quiero" is "Daddy I Love You", it is not directed towards Queen's father but to her love interest; "Papi" can be translated to "baby". "Quiero Bailar" (I Want To Dance) incorporates the Liquid riddim, a musical riddim produced by the "Jamaican cross-over guru" Jeremy Harding. The song's lyrics "warn her dance partner not to misinterpret her moves." She degrades her partner who thinks that just because she dances with him that she is automatically going to have sexual relations with him.

== Critical reception ==
Professional ratings
Review scores
Source	Rating
Entertainment Weekly	(favorable)
The New York Times	(favorable)
Pitchfork	8.0/10
Rhapsody	(favorable)
Reggaetonline	5/5 stars

The album garnered mainly positive reviews from critics. Sarah Bardeen of Rhapsody said the album established Queen as "the voice for women", complimenting her "self-assured delivery". She claimed that the tracks in which featured guest artists "get the sense that the guys she's trading verses with are trying to keep up with her and not the other way around," noting that the platinum edition "launched the monster hit "Quiero Bailar". Rachel Devitt, also writing for Rhapsody, categorized the album as "Urban Latin" music. Michael Endelman of Entertainment Weekly called the album their number one pick for crossover success in the United States while complimenting the "catchy hooks and sticky grooves" found on the album. Kalefa Sanneh of The New York Times said "[Queen] celebrates her hybrid genre by refusing to stay put", while claiming Queen to sometimes depart from "reggaeton's sharp, steady shuffle to explore other rhythms". She later said that the album would make Queen a "likely candidate for crossover success, if only she didn't sing in Spanish". An editor for the Chicago Tribune selected the album as one of three to "add to your reggaetón collection" other than Daddy Yankee's Barrio Fino (2004). The writer noted the included hits ("Quiero Bailar" and "Papi Te Quiero"), along with "[the album's] handful of remixes–and a whole lot of attitude".

The album was highly anticipated and acclaimed and widely regarded as a factor in reggaeton's mainstream exposure in 2004 along with her next studio album Real (2004), Daddy Yankee's Barrio Fino and Tego Calderon's El Enemy de los Guasíbiri (2004), after being certified Platinum in the Latin field signifying sales of over 100,000 by the Recording Industry Association of America (RIAA). The album was listed on The Washington Post’s list of the "Best Old Albums Rediscovered in 2017." Jonathan Widran of Allmusic described "Quiero Bailar" as a song that "gets the party and people moving" and as well as being one of Queen's hits. Kid Curry, of Rhythmic Top 40 WPOW (Power 96) cites Ivy Queen's release of "Yo Quiero Bailar" as "the last reggaetón super-hit". In 2017, the song was included on Billboard's 12 Best Dancehall & Reggaeton Choruses of the 21st Century at number ten. Later that year, the online magazine Pop Sugar listed the song as one of the best reggaeton songs of all time. It was also listed as one of 15 essential Reggaetón songs that are not "Despacito." Rolling Stone ranked the song on its chronological list of the 50 Greatest Latin Pop Songs of all time. The song ranked at number 60 on NPR Music's list of the 200 Best Songs by 21st Century Women. "Papi Te Quiero" was selected as one of the hits from "The Golden Era of Reggaetón" which lasted from 2003 until 2007 by Jesus Trivino of Latina magazine.

The album was nominated for "Reggaeton Album of the Year" at the 2005 Billboard Latin Music Awards where she was also nominated for "Tropical Airplay Track of the Year, Female" and "Tropical Airplay Track of the Year, New Artist".

== Commercial performance ==
Diva was a commercial success, peaking at number twenty-four on the Billboard Top Latin Albums chart. On the Billboard Top Heatseekers (South Atlantic) chart, the recording peaked at number eight. Diva peaked at number four on the Billboard Reggae Albums chart. On the Billboard Tropical Albums chart, Diva peaked at number one, spending four nonconsecutive weeks at the top with a total of 86 weeks on the chart, becoming the eighth best-selling Tropical Album of 2004. This also made Queen the eighth best-performing Tropical Artist of 2004 as well. In 2005, the album managed to peak at number seventeen on the Billboard Latin Rhythm Albums chart.

On the Billboard Hot Latin Songs chart, "Quiero Bailar" debuted at number thirty-five for the week of September 3, 2005, becoming the "Hot Shot Debut" of that week and peaked at number twenty-nine for the week of September 17, 2005. While on the Billboard Latin Rhythm Songs chart, it peaked at number eight for the week of October 29, 2005. It debuted under the name "Yo Quiero Bailar" at number thirty-seven on the week of December 20, 2003 and peaked at number twenty-four for the issue dated January 17, 2004 on the Billboard Tropical Songs chart. The song re-entered the Billboard Tropical Songs chart under the name "Quiero Bailar" at number thirty-six on the week of March 6, 2004 and peaked at number sixteen for the week of July 9, 2005. It became the first Spanish-language track to reach number one on Miami's WPOW Rhythmic Top 40, an American radio station based in Miami, Florida that does not usually play Spanish music. She explained: "I've worked very hard in my career, but I get surprised because I've never expected to get to these places." She added: "When I read Sony's reports and they tell me my albums are being heard in London and my song is number one, I [got] surprised and look[ed] for explanations." The other five singles did not gain significant airplay in the United States, however, they were heard on Miami's WPOW Rhythmic Top 40. Kid Curry, of the station commented that the commercial failure of these songs are the fault of the record label. According to him, labels were not servicing reggaetón singles at the time and that he was receiving them "by word-of-mouth". By March 2004, the original version of the album had sold 10,000 units in the United States and Puerto Rico.

== Track listing ==
- Standard Edition

No.	Title	Writer(s)	Producer(s)	Length
1.	"Intro"	Martha Pesante	DJ Adam	1:24
2.	"Súbelo"	Pesante	DJ Adam	3:07
3.	"Guillaera" (featuring Gran Omar)	Pesante, Omar Navarro	DJ Adam	4:02
4.	"Drama"	Pesante	DJ Adam	2:54
5.	"Tuya Soy"	Pesante	DJ Adam	2:47
6.	"Bésame"	Pesante	DJ Eric	3:04
7.	"Me Acostumbré"	Pesante	Noriega	2:47
8.	"Alerta"	Pesante	DJ Adam	3:02
9.	"Babe"	Pesante	DJ Adam	3:16
10.	"Sangre" (featuring Mexicano 777)	Pesante, Israel Parales	DJ Adam	3:36
11.	"Tú No Puedes"	Pesante, Paul Irizarry	Ecko	3:36
12.	"Money Making" (featuring Japanese and Gran Omar)	Pesante, Navarro	DJ Adam	4:05
13.	"Venganza"	Pesante	DJ Alex	3:07
14.	"Bounce" (featuring Bimbo)	Pesante, Alejandro Carmona, Paul Irizarry	Ecko	2:56
15.	"Bailamé"	Pesante	DJ Adam	3:01
16.	"Dile Que Ya" (featuring K-7)	Pesante, Louis Sharpe, Carlos Berríos	Carlos Berríos	4:03
17.	"Babe" (Remix featuring Gran Omar)	Pesante	DJ Adam	3:17
Total length:				54:04

Platinum Edition
No.	Title	Writer(s)	Producer(s)	Length
1.	"Intro"	Martha Pesante,	DJ Adam	1:24
2.	"Papi Te Quiero"	Anthony Kelly, Pesante, Omar Navarro	Anthony "CD" Kelly, Rafi Mercenario, Octopus	3:10
3.	"Guillaera" (featuring Gran Omar)	Pesante, Navarro	DJ Adam	4:02
4.	"Drama"	Pesante	DJ Adam	2:54
5.	"Tuya Soy"	Pesante	DJ Adam	2:47
6.	"Bésame"	Pesante	DJ Eric	3:04
7.	"Me Acostumbré"	Pesante	Noriega	2:47
8.	"Alerta"	Pesante	DJ Adam	3:02
9.	"Babe"	Pesante	DJ Adam	3:16
10.	"Sangre" (featuring Mexicano 777)	Pesante, Israel Perales	DJ Adam	3:36
11.	"Tú No Puedes"	Pesante, Paul Irizarry	Ecko	3:36
12.	"Money Making" (featuring Japanese and Gran Omar)	Pesante, Navarro	DJ Adam	4:05
13.	"Venganza"	Pesante	DJ Alex	3:07
14.	"Bounce" (featuring Bimbo)	Pesante, Alejandro Carmona, Paul Irizarry	Ecko	2:56
15.	"Súbelo"	Pesante	DJ Adam	3:07
16.	"Bailamé"	Pesante	DJ Alex	3:01
17.	"Dile Que Ya" (featuring K-7)	Pesante, Louis Sharpe, Carlos Berríos	Carlos Berríos	4:03
18.	"Babe" (Remix featuring Gran Omar)	Pesante	DJ Adam	3:17
19.	"Papi Te Quiero" (English remix)	Kelly, Pesante, Navarro	Anthony "CD" Kelly	3:14
20.	"Quiero Saber" (featuring Gran Omar)	Pesante, Navarro	DJ Nelson, Luny Tunes, Noriega	2:55
21.	"Tú No Puedes" (Reggaeton remix)	Pesante, Paul Irizarry	Ecko, Rafi Mercenario	3:36
22.	"Quiero Bailar"	Pesante, Navarro	Iván Joy, Jeremy Harding	3:06
Total length:				70:09

Sample credits

- "Babe" samples the Rice & Peas riddim, produced by Paul Edmond and Rohan Fuller, from the album Riddim Driven: Rice & Peas (2001).
- "Sangre" samples "Mi Hermano" from the 1969 album Digan Lo Que Digan by Raphael.
- "Papi Te Quiero" samples the Buy Out riddim, produced by Tony Kelly, from the album Riddim Driven: Buy Out (2001).
- "Quiero Bailar" samples the Liquid riddim, produced by Jeremey Harding, from the album Riddim Driven: Liquid (2001).

== Personnel ==
The credits are taken from the albums' liner notes

"Intro – Diva" (BMI 2002)

- Ivy Queen – interpreter, composer
- DJ Adam – musical producer
- Gran Omar – co-producer
- Boricua Music Studio – recording location

"Súbelo" (BMI 2002)

- Ivy Queen – interpreter, composer
- DJ Adam – musical producer
- Gran Omar – co-producer
- Boricua Music Studio – recording location

"Guillaera" (BMI 2002)

- Ivy Queen – interpreter, composer
- DJ Adam – musical producer
- Gran Omar – co-producer, interpreter, composer, featured artist
- Boricua Music Studio – recording location

"Drama" (BMI 2002)

- Ivy Queen – interpreter, composer
- DJ Adam – musical producer
- Gran Omar – co-producer
- Boricua Music Studio – recording location

"Tuya Soy" (BMI 2002)

- Ivy Queen – interpreter, composer
- DJ Adam – musical producer
- Gran Omar – co-producer
- Boricua Music Studio – recording location

"Bésame" (BMI 2002)

- Ivy Queen – interpreter, composer
- DJ Eric – musical producer
- Gran Omar – co-producer
- Los Angeles Recording Studio – recording location

"Me Acostumbré" (BMI 2002)

- Ivy Queen – interpreter, composer
- Noriega – musical producer
- Gran Omar – co-producer
- Flow Music Studios – recording location

"Alerta" (BMI 2002)

- Ivy Queen – interpreter, composer
- DJ Adam – musical producer
- Gran Omar – co-producer
- Los Angeles Recording Studio – recording location

"Babe" (BMI 2003)

- Ivy Queen – interpreter, composer
- DJ Adam – musical producer
- Gran Omar – co-producer
- Los Angeles Recording Studio – recording location

"Sangre" (BMI 2002)

- Ivy Queen – interpreter, composer
- DJ Adam – musical producer
- Gran Omar – co-producer
- Mexicano 777 – interpreter, composer
- Los Angeles Recording Studio – recording location

"Tú No Puedes" (BMI 2003)

- Ivy Queen – interpreter, composer
- Ecko – musical producer
- Gran Omar – co-producer
- The Lab Studio – recording location

"Money Making" (BMI 2003)

- Ivy Queen – interpreter, composer
- DJ Adam – musical producer
- Gran Omar – co-producer, interpreter, composer
- Japanese – interpreter
- Boricua Music Studio – recording location

"Venganza" (BMI 2002)

- Ivy Queen – interpreter, composer
- DJ Alex – musical producer
- Gran Omar – co-producer
- The Lab Studio – recording location

"Bounce" (BMI 2003)

- Ivy Queen – interpreter, composer
- Ecko – musical producer
- Gran Omar – co-producer
- Bimbo – interpreter, composer
- The Lab Studio – recording location

"Bailamé" (BMI 2003)

- Ivy Queen – interpreter, composer
- Joel – musical producer
- Gran Omar – co-producer
- The Lab Studio – recording location

"Dile Que Ya" (BMI 2002)

- Ivy Queen – interpreter, composer
- Carlos Berríos – musical producer
- Gran Omar – co-producer
- K-7 – chorus, featured artist
- After Dark Studios – recording location

"Babe (Remix)" (BMI 2002)

- Ivy Queen – interpreter, composer
- DJ Adam – musical producer
- Gran Omar – co-producer, interpreter, composer, featured artist
- Boricua Music Studio – recording location

"Papi Te Quiero" (Imperio Music/BMI 2003)

- Ivy Queen – interpreter, composer
- Tony "CD" Kelly – musical producer
- Rafi Mecenario – musical producer
- Octopus – musical producer
- Gran Omar – co-producer
- Mad Jam Studio – recording location

"Papi Te Quiero (English remix)" (Imperio Music/BMI 2003)

- Ivy Queen – interpreter, composer
- Tony "CD" Kelly – musical producer
- Rafi Mecenario – musical producer, mixing engineer
- Octopus – musical producer
- Ecko – mixing engineer
- Gran Omar – co-producer
- Mad Jam Studio – recording location

"Quiero Saber" (Imperio Music/BMI 2002)

- Ivy Queen – interpreter, composer
- Luny Tunes – musical producer
- Rafi Mecenario – musical producer
- DJ Nelson – musical producer
- Noriega – musical producer
- Gran Omar – co-producer, interpreter,
- Flow Music Studios – recording location

"Tú No Puedes (Reggaetón remix)" (Imperio Music/Real Music/BMI 2003)

- Ivy Queen – interpreter, composer
- Ecko – musical producer
- Rafi Mecenario – musical producer, mixing engineer
- Gran Omar – co-producer
- The Lab Studio – recording location
- Flow Music Studios – recording location

"Quiero Bailar" (Imperio Music/BMI 2003)

- Ivy Queen – interpreter, composer
- Iván Joy – musical producer
- DJ Adam – musical producer
- Gran Omar – co-producer
- Mad Jam Studio – recording location

=== Technical credits ===
- Arden B. – wardrobe
- Ariel "New Dimension Salon" – hair
- Bimbo – featured artist
- José D. Cotté – original artwork for ACO Digital
- Disc Maker – masterization
- DJ Adam – musical producer
- DJ Alex – musical producer
- DJ Eric – musical producer
- DJ Nelson – musical producer
- Carlos M. Garcia – photography
- Gran Omar – featured artist, composer, executive producer, co-producer
- Green Solutions – manufacturer
- Home Good (Marshalls) – furniture
- Ivy Queen – primary artist, composer, co-executive producer, vocals
- Iván Joy – musical producer
- Japanese – featured artist
- Javier López – preparation, final design
- Joel – musical producer
- Luny Tunes – musical producer
- Mexicano 777 – featured artist, composer
- Noriega – musical producer
- Joel Nunez – cover design
- Octopus – musical production
- Q-Za – makeup, accessories
- Perfect Image Records – executive production, record labl
- Rafi Mercenario – musical producer, mixing engineer
- Real Music, Inc. – executive production, exclusive distribution, record label
- Shure – accessories
- The Closet – wardrobe
- Tony "CD" Kelly – musical production
- Universal Music Latino – manufacturer, distribution
- Villa Music World – accessories

== Charts ==
=== Weekly charts ===
Chart (2004)	Peak Position
US Top Latin Albums (Billboard)	24
US Top Heatseekers (South Atlantic) (Billboard)	8
US Reggae Albums (Billboard)	4
US Tropical Albums (Billboard)	1

Chart (2005)	Peak Position
US Latin Rhythm Albums (Billboard)	17

=== Year-end charts ===
Chart (2004)	Position
US Tropical Albums (Billboard)	8

== Sales and certifications ==
Region	Certification	Certified units/sales
United States (RIAA)	Platinum (Latin)	100,000^{^}
^{^} Shipments figures based on certification alone.

== See also ==
- List of number-one Billboard Tropical Albums from the 2000s
