= Chica Ideal =

Chica Ideal may refer to:

- "Chica Ideal" (Sebastián Yatra and Guaynaa song), 2020
- "Chica Ideal", 2013 song by Chino & Nacho
- "Chika Ideal", 2004 song by Ivy Queen
