= Como Mujer =

1997 single by Ivy Queen

Single by Ivy Queen

from the album En Mi Imperio
- Released: 2 September 1997
- Recorded: 1997
- Genre: Reggaetón
- Length: 3:41
- Label: House of Music, Sony International Records
- Songwriter(s): Martha Pesante
- Producer(s): DJ Nelson

Ivy Queen singles chronology
"Reggae Respect" (1996)	"Como Mujer" (1997)	"Pongan Atención" (1997)

"Como Mujer" (English: "As A Woman") is a song by Puerto Rican recording artist Ivy Queen, from her debut studio album, En Mi Imperio (1997). It was composed by Queen, produced by DJ Nelson, and released as the album's lead single in 1997. The single was followed by "Pongan Atención". Both "Como Mujer" and "Pongan Atencion" have been certified Gold and Platinum in sales.

== Background ==
When she was eighteen, Queen moved from Añasco, Puerto Rico to San Juan, Puerto Rico, where she met rapper and producer DJ Negro. In 1995, she joined an all-male Puerto Rican group called The Noise, at the invitation of DJ Negro. The group became part of the emerging reggaeton scene. DJ Negro began producing a series of CDs centered on The Noise. Queen made her first appearance on the fifth installment of the CD series on a track called "Somos Raperos Pero No Delincuentes".

She became tired of the violent and sexual themes often used in reggaeton, and wished to write about a wider variety of subjects. DJ Negro convinced Queen to go solo, and in 1996 she began recording material for her debut studio album.

== Musical composition ==
Ivy Queen "Como Mujer" (1995)
A 21 second sample of the album's lead single "Como Mujer".

"Como Mujer", ("As A Woman"), the album's lead single, was composed in minor key tonality and takes influences from Afro-Latin sources. Musically, the song features synthetic instrumentation and Puerto Rican roots while lyrically, the song features social or political themes.

== Reception ==
The song, along with "Pongan Atencion" has been certified Gold and Platinum in sales, according to the Lakeland Ledger. As of February 2004, the album has sold over 80,000 copies in the United States, and over 100,000 copies in Puerto Rico. It, along with the two singles, however, have not been certified by the Recording Industry Association of America. In 2004, Queen revealed that she did not receive any profits from the album's sales due to her inexperience in the music business.
