= Quiero Bailar (song) =

2003 single by Ivy Queen

Single by Ivy Queen

from the album Diva Platinum Edition
- Released: August 2003
- Recorded: 2002
- Genre: Reggaetón, dancehall
- Length: 3:03
- Label: Universal Music Latino
- Songwriters: Martha Pesante, Omar Navarro
- Producers: Iván Joy, Jeremy Harding

Ivy Queen singles chronology
"Ritmo Latino" (2001)	"Quiero Bailar" (2003)	"Quiero Saber" (2004)

"Quiero Bailar" ("I Want to Dance") is a song by Puerto Rican reggaetón artist Ivy Queen, from the platinum edition of her third studio album, Diva (2003). It was composed by Queen alongside her then-husband Gran Omar, produced by Iván Joy and released as the lead single from the album in 2003. Lyrically, "the song talks about a guy expecting sex after a dance like it was a bad thing." Addressing the topic of female autonomy of the body, the song has become recognized as a female empowerment anthem.

The song became the first Spanish-language song to reach the top position on Miami's WPOW Rhythmic Top 40, the first Spanish song to do so, while reaching the top 10 of the Billboard Latin Rhythm Airplay chart. The song has become known as the first female reggaeton feminist anthem among songs that lyrically degraded women. An accompanying music video was filmed for the song which featured cameos from her ex-husband Omar Navarro, known artistically as Gran Omar.

In 2019, the song was re-recorded by a women-led team of engineers and released as a single on International Women's Day. In 2022, Rolling Stone magazine listed the song at number two on their list of the best reggaeton songs of all time.

== Background ==
Following the release of Queen's first two studio albums En Mi Imperio (1997) and The Original Rude Girl (1998), she was dropped from the Sony label and took a hiatus from her musical career in 1999. The lead single, "In The Zone" with Wyclef Jean was able to chart in the United States, becoming her first Billboard chart entry. The album received critical acclaim, with an editor for AllMusic awarding it four out of five stars, and listing it as a selected "AllMusic Pick".

In 2001 and 2002, Queen recorded several tracks for reggaeton compilation albums spawning hits like "Quiero Bailar" which is originally from The Majestic 2 and "Quiero Saber" from Kilates. In 2003, Queen signed with Real Music, an independent label based in Miami, Florida and established by Jorge Guadalupe and Anthony Pérez. They appeared on the label's first album Jams Vol. 1 which Pérez released after several major record labels turn him down. Pérez would also produce the reggaetón television show The Roof, which aired on mun2 and detailed urban music and lifestyle. Queen would appear frequently and perform on the show. After the success of her third studio album Diva (2003), which would be certified platinum by the Recording Industry Association of America (RIAA), Ivy Queen released a platinum edition of the album in 2004 with bonus tracks, of those included are "Quiero Bailar" and the singles "Quiero Saber", "Papi Te Quiero" and "Tu No Puedes".

== Composition ==
Ivy Queen "Quiero Bailar" (2002)
A 25 second sample of "Quiero Bailar" featuring the chorus and part of Ivy Queen's first verse.

"Quiero Bailar" was written by Ivy Queen. It was produced by the Puerto Rican reggaetón producer Iván Joy, who also produced "Quiero Saber". Originally featured on Iván Joy's reggaetón compilation album, The Majestic (2002), the song was also later included on Queen's fifth studio album, Flashback (2005) and second compilation album, Reggaeton Queen (2006) and first EP, e5 (2006).

The song incorporates the Liquid riddim, a musical riddim produced by the "Jamaican cross-over guru" Jeremy Harding. The song's lyrics warn her dance partner not to misinterpret her moves. In the song, she berates a man who thinks that just because they dance she is automatically going to bed with him.

== Release and chart performance ==
"Quiero Bailar" was released in 2003 as the lead single from the album by Universal Music Latino followed by five more singles. On the Billboard Hot Latin Songs chart, the song debuted at thirty-five for the week of September 3, 2005, becoming the "Hot Shot Debut" of the week and peaked at number twenty-nine for the week of September 17, 2005. Billboard Latin Rhythm Songs chart, the song peaked at number eight. On the Billboard Tropical Songs chart, the song debuted as "Yo Quiero Bailar" at number thirty-seven on the week of December 20, 2003 and peaked at number twenty-four on January 17, 2004.

It re-entered the Billboard Tropical Songs chart as "Quiero Bailar" at number thirty-six on the week of March 6, 2004 and peaked at number sixteen for the week of July 9, 2005. The song became the first Spanish-language track to reach number one on Miami's WPOW Rhythmic Top 40, an American radio station based in Miami, Florida that did not usually play Spanish music. "I've worked very hard in my career, but I get surprised because I've never expected to get to these places." Ivy Queen said. "When I read Sony's reports and they tell me my albums are being heard in London and my song is number one, I get surprised and look for explanations."

== Music video ==
Ivy Queen in the music video for "Quiero Bailar" in which Gran Omar also appears.

A music video for the song was filmed and released. Although, it has not been posted to any of Queen’s official accounts, there are multiple unofficial postings of the video on YouTube that have garnered over one million views each, including: 161,194,079 views, 50,054,378 views, 23,982,594 views, 22,055,522 views, 15,131,577 views, 13,241,069 views, 10,263,099 views, 4,311,195 views, 3,677,399 views, 2,780,826 views, 2,007,497 views, 1,909,762 views, bringing the total to 310,608,997 views as of December 2022.

== Critical reception and legacy ==
Jonathan Widran of AllMusic described the track as a song that "gets the party and people moving" and as well as being one of Ivy Queen's hits. Ramiro Burr of Billboard stated that "Quiero Bailar" shows how effortlessly and quickly she alternately sings and raps, claiming that she has a distinct vocal style that evokes Gwen Stefani. Kid Curry, program director of the Rhythmic Top 40 WPOW (Power 96) radio station, cites Ivy Queen's release of "Yo Quiero Bailar" as "the last reggaetón super-hit". The song has become recognized as a feminist anthem. Editors for Refinery29 hailed the song as being vital to women, twenty years after its release.

In 2017, the song was included on Billboard's 12 Best Dancehall & Reggaeton Choruses of the 21st Century at number ten. Later that year, the online magazine Pop Sugar listed the song as one of the best reggaeton songs of all time. It was also listed as one of 15 essential Reggaetón songs that are not "Despacito." Rolling Stone ranked the song on its chronicle list of the 50 Greatest Latin Pop Songs of all time. The song ranked at number 60 on NPR Music's list of the 200 Best Songs by 21st Century Women. In 2022, Rolling Stone listed the song at number 2 on its list of the 100 Greatest Reggaeton Songs of All Time. In 2025, the magazine listed the song at number 146 on its list of the 250 Greatest Songs of the 21st Century.

=== Cover versions ===
"Quiero Bailar" was covered by Puerto Rican rapper Dlaklle on the reggaetón compilation album Reggaetón 30 Pegaditas (2005). Recording artist Abaya covered "Quiero Bailar" on the album Evolución Urbana (2005). Boricua Boys also included their rendition of the song on their second album Reggaetón (2006). The song’s chorus was sampled by Ecuadorian singer Sophy Mell, on her 2018 single "Ponte Pa Mi" with Puerto Rican duo Jowell & Randy. Chilean singer Paloma Mami also interpolated its chorus on her 2019 single, "Mami."

In 2021, Ivy Queen joined Colombian singer Karol G on the reggaetón homage-track "Leyendas" ("legends"), from Karol G's 2021 multiplatinum album KG0516. The track is a mashup of and tribute to several iconic reggaetón anthems, including songs by Wisin, Nicky Jam and Zion & Lennox, and begins with an updated intro of "Quiero Bailar", in which Ivy Queen is heard saying: «Señoras y señores, bienvenidos al perreo intenso 2020. ¿O es 2021? Agarren a su pareja y prepárense, porque viene Karol G, y no está fácil.» Then she sings a chorus, followed by Karol G singing the song’s original first verse, followed by Ivy Queen singing the song’s famous bridge: «Mujeres, pa’ la disco a bailar, ven demuéstrale a tu man que es la qué hay. Mujeres, pa’ la disco a perrear, pero que él no se creía pueda jugar. Y cómo ya expliqué...»

== Track listings ==
- Album version
1. "Quiero Bailar" — 3:06
- Promo single
1. "Papi Te Quiero" — 3:16
2. "Tu No Puedes" — 3:34
3. "Quiero Bailar" — 3:02
- Extended play (EP)
1. "Cuéntale" — 3:22
2. "Libertad" — 3:29
3. "Te He Querido, Te He Llorado" — 4:17
4. "Quiero Bailar" — 3:03
5. "Quiero Saber" — 2:51

== Charts ==
Chart (2005)	Peak Position
US Hot Latin Songs (Billboard)	29
US Latin Tropical Airplay (Billboard)	16
US Latin Rhythm Airplay (Billboard)	8

== Certifications ==
Certifications for "Quiero Bailar"
Region	Certification	Certified units/sales
Spain (Promusicae)	Gold	30,000^{‡}
^{*} Sales figures based on certification alone.

== 2019 re-recording ==
"Yo Quiero Bailar"

Single by Ivy Queen
- Released: March 5, 2019
- Recorded: February 2019
- Studio: Electric Lady Studios in New York City
- Genre: Reggaeton
- Length: 3:06
- Label: NKS Music
- Songwriters: Martha Pesante, Omar Navarro
- Producers: Julio Cartagena, Taylor Pollock, Ramera Abraham, Jeanne Montalvo

Ivy Queen singles chronology
"Pal Frente y Pa Tras" (2019)	"Yo Quiero Bailar" (2019)	"787" (2019)

=== Background ===
Im August 2018, the music streaming service Spotify created the Equal Studio Residency program from women. In a partnership with Berklee College of Music and Electric Lady Studios, the program was created to "help open the door for emerging female producers and engineers while shining a light on the great work already being done by women in the music industry."

=== Recording ===
The song was recorded by a female-led team of engineers in February 2019. Kerry Steib, Spotify's Director of Social Impact called Queen "a legend who has been talking about—and been a role model for—empowerment throughout her career." The song was almost entirely performed, engineered, mixed, and mastered by women. The only exception was the song's producer, Julio Cartagena. It was released as a single exclusively on Spotify on March 5, 2019. The song's release was used to celebrate International Women's Day.
