= Papi Te Quiero =

Single by Ivy Queen

from the album Diva Platinum Edition
- Released: January 2004
- Recorded: 2003
- Genre: Reggaetón, Dancehall
- Length: 3:14 (Standard version); 3:16 (English version)
- Label: Universal Music Latino
- Songwriters: Anthony Kelly, Martha Pesante, Omar Navarro
- Producers: Anthony "CD" Kelly, Rafi Mercenario, Ecko

Ivy Queen singles chronology
"Quiero Saber" (2004)	"Papi Te Quiero" (2004)	"Dat Sexy Body" (2004)

Audio sample
- A 28 second sample of the English version of "Papi Te Quiero" featuring the chorus and part of the second verse.: file; help

"Papi Te Quiero" (English: Daddy I Love You) is a song by Puerto Rican reggaetón recording artist Ivy Queen, from the platinum edition of her third studio album, Diva (2003). It was composed by Queen and her then husband Gran Omar, produced by Tony "CD" Kelly and Rafi Mercenario and released as the third single from the album in 2004. The song heavily samples Sean Paul's "Like Glue" released a year earlier. On digital editions of the album, Anthony Kelly, co-writer of "Like Glue", is credited as being featured on the song, though, provides no vocals. There is a music video associated with the song released along with the music video for the last single off the album "Tu No Puedes". In the music video, she sports the Los Angeles Lakers' women's sport outfit. Ivy Queen performed the English version of the song on ABC's Good Morning America. The song was performed as a part of the set of her 2008 World Tour which was held from the José Miguel Agrelot Coliseum, also known as the Coliseum of Puerto Rico in San Juan, Puerto Rico.

== Background ==
In 1999, following the failed commercial success of her first two studio albums (1997's En Mi Imperio and 1998's The Original Rude Girl), Ivy Queen was dropped from the Sony label, taking a self-imposed break from her musical career. Though the moderate hit, "In The Zone" with Wyclef Jean was able to chart in the United States, the second single "Ritmo Latino" and the album The Original Rude Girl were not, and were subsequently overlooked and effectively forgotten. However, The Original Rude Girl was critically acclaimed by many, including an editor for Allmusic; they rated the album 4/5 stars and listed it as a selected "Allmusic Pick". This occurred after she left Sony and "stepped out of Wyclef Jean's shadow".

In 2001 and 2002, Queen began appearing on reggaetón compilation albums, spawning hits like "Quiero Bailar" from The Majestic 2 and "Quiero Saber" from Kilates. In 2003, Queen and her then-husband Gran Omar signed with Real Music, an independent label based in Miami, Florida, established by Jorge Guadalupe and Anthony Pérez. They appeared on the label's first album Jams Vol. 1, which Pérez released after several major record labels turned him down. Ivy Queen benefited from Pérez producing the early reggaetón television show "The Roof" (which aired on mun2, highlighting urban music, fashion and lifestyle), frequently appearing and performing on the show. After the success of the album (which would be certified platinum by the RIAA), Ivy Queen released a platinum edition in 2004 with bonus tracks, including "Papi Te Quiero" in English plus the singles "Quiero Bailar", "Quiero Saber" and "Tú No Puedes".

== Composition ==
Ivy Queen in the music video for "Papi Te Quiero" where in various scenes she sports the Lakers' women's sport outfit.

"Papi Te Quiero" was composed by Ivy Queen herself. It was produced by Tony "CD" Kelly and Rafi Mercenario. This was the start of a musical relationship between Queen and Mercenario, who later produced Ivy Queen's biggest hits including "Chika Ideal", "Cuéntale" and "Libertad". The song samples Sean Paul's "Like Glue" which in turn samples T.O.K.'s "Money 2 Burn". The original version of the song blends reggaeton with the beat of "Like Glue", however the English version features the same beat as "Like Glue". On digital editions of the album, Anthony Kelly, co-writer of "Like Glue", is credited as being featured on the song, though, provides no vocals. An example of this can be seen on the track "We Found Love" by Rihanna where Calvin Harris is credited as being on the song but provides no vocals. "Papi Te Quiero", named one of the album's biggest hits, "pairs a straightforward love song with the well known Reggae riddim Buyout."

Ramiro Burr of Billboard stated "Papi Te Quiero" shows "how effortlessly and quickly she alternately sings and raps" while claiming that she has a "distinct vocal style that evokes Gwen Stefani". He also described the song as a "chart-topping single", though the song did not have any major chart success. However, the song was heard on independent radio stations such as Miami's Rhythmic Top 40 WPOW station. Kid Curry, PD of the station commented that the commercial failure of such songs are the fault of the record label. According to him, labels were not servicing reggaeton singles and that he was receiving them "by word-of-mouth". According to a study of over 290 radio stations located in the United States and Mexico, "Papi Te Quiero" was the tenth most played tropical song of 2004. Although the literal translation of "Papi Te Quiero" is "Daddy, I Love You", the song is not directed towards Queen's own father, but to her love interest; “father”, formally, is “padre” or “papa” for “dad”. However, in Spanish, the nickname "papi" is used to refer to a male lover or even a male friend, more or less calling them "babe" or "baby". Normally, this is a romantic and/or sexually flirtatious reference, but it can also be used casually; for example, “papi, hurry up,” or “Okay, papi, talk to you later.” "Papi Te Quiero" was selected as one of the hits from "The Golden Era of Reggaetón" which lasted from 2003 until 2007 by Jesus Trivino of Latina magazine.

== Track listing ==
- Album Version
1. "Papi Te Quiero" — 3:16
2. "Papi Te Quiero" (English version) — 3:14
- CD Single
1. "Papi Te Quiero" (Album Version) — 3:16
2. "Papi Te Quiero" (Remix by Rafi Mercenario and Ecko) — 3:14
3. "Quiero Saber" (Album Version) — 2:54
- Promo Single
1. "Papi Te Quiero" — 3:16
2. "Tu No Puedes" — 3:34
3. "Quiero Bailar" — 3:02
