= Chika Ideal =

2004 song performed by Ivy Queen

Single by Ivy Queen

from the album Real
- Released: May 2004
- Recorded: March – April 2004; Marroneo Studios (Bayamón, Puerto Rico)
- Genre: Reggaetón
- Length: 3:01
- Label: Universal Music Latino, Perfect Image
- Songwriter: Martha Ivelisse Pesante
- Producer: Rafi Mercenario

Ivy Queen singles chronology
"Súbelo" (2004)	"Chika Ideal" (2004)	"Rociarlos" (2004)

"Chika Ideal" (English: "Ideal Girl") is a song by Puerto Rican recording artist Ivy Queen from her fourth studio album Real (2004). It was written by Martha Ivelisse Pesante, produced by Rafi Mercenario and released as the lead single from the album in May 2004 on Universal Music Latino and Perfect Image.

Lyrically, the song follows the protagonist talking to her lover, assuring him that she is going to be with him. Queen performed the song for the first time on Don Francisco Presenta. Furthermore, the video for the song reached the top of the music video countdown hosted by Terra Networks.

== Background ==
Queen's 2003 third studio recording, Diva, was a factor in reggaetón's mainstream exposure in 2004 (with Daddy Yankee's Barrio Fino and Tego Calderon's El Enemy de los Guasíbiri), and was certified platinum by the Recording Industry Association of America. Queen released a platinum edition of the album with extra tracks, including "Papi Te Quiero" and "Tu No Puedes", and began recording her next album. Her fourth studio album was originally planned to be Queen's debut full-length English language album after she received recording contract offerings from multiple record labels including Sony. She said it was a good opportunity to reach and take over the competitive market of English hip hop music after becoming popular in Latin American countries. Queen signed a deal to record an English-language album after Sony contacted her and notified her that her albums from when she was with the label six years prior are now being heard in cities like London. This was because of the success of Diva. Despite her concerns over her poor English pronunciation, she continued with the project. She recorded songs with many of hip hop's biggest MCs including American rapper Fat Joe, who recorded a song in English for her debut English album in support of her. The song was later turned into "Quítate Two" and included on Real, while American hip hop producer Swizz Beatz handled production of "Soldados" showcasing her crossover appeal.

== Composition and recording ==
Ivy Queen "Chika Ideal" (2004)
An 18-second sample of the lead single from the album, "Chika Ideal", which Ivy Queen performed on "Don Francisco Presenta" in promotion of the album.

According to an editor for Rolling Stone, the album contains "raspy braggadocio and sexy rhymes" which complement Queen's raspy vocals. Queen said "I really think this album is for people to really just sit down and listen to it". She explained that "there are times that the songs will make you want to dance" but their lyrical content was more meaningful. Queen wanted the overall feeling of the album to express that she is a well–rounded artist. Furthermore, describing the album: "[the songs] are always going to be real because they are feelings that people have," she asserts. "The hits that I have now, the girls love them because they are real. If I am feeling hurt and need to curse to express that, then I will. I am going to be real all the way because that's what made Ivy Queen." This is prominent on "Chika Ideal", where she assures the protagonists' lover that she wants to be with him and fulfill his fantasies.

Ivy Queen appeared on "Don Francisco Presenta" where she performed "Chika Ideal" in promotion of the album. Queen performed on the "Reggaeton Tour 2004" which also featured other artist including Aldo Ranks and La Factoria in various South American countries including Ecuador where she performed songs such as "Papi Te Quiero" and "Chika Ideal", promoting both Diva and Real. At the end of the month, Queen appeared on a special network television news segment detailing her career and struggle for respect within the genre of reggaetón. This occurred during studio recording sessions for the album. In February 2005, she performed "Chika Ideal", among other songs, at the "Festival of Puerto Rican Stars", which was a historic achievement for reggaetón, as no other performer from the genre was invited to attend the event. In June 2005, she appeared on the "Invasion Del Reggaetón Tour" with Daddy Yankee, which grossed $817,220 for the week of June 18. She also attended and performed at the Billboard Bash!, the night before the 2005 Billboard Latin Music Awards.

== Reception ==
Ivy Queen in the music video for "Chika Ideal"

While reviewing the reggaetón compilation album, Jamz TV Hits, Vol. 3, an editor for Allmusic listed "Chika Ideal" as a selected "Allmusic Pick". The song was also selected as one of the hits from "The Golden Era of Reggaetón" which lasted from 2003 until 2007 by Jesus Trivino of Latina magazine. Terra Networks named the music video for "Chika Ideal" as one of the hottest of the summer and claimed the song to show "why she is the queen of reggaetón".

Despite not charting in Billboard magazine, the video reached the Top 10 for four consecutive weeks on Terra Networks' Top Music Video countdown. In the music video for the song, Queen is video taped showing sensual scenes by several cameras from different angles. Scenes alternate between a dance in a darkened room and Queen is a record studio and the cameras. She is surrounded by multiple computers and flat screen television sets which display the feeds from the cameras.

== Track listing ==
No.	Title	Writer(s)	Producer(s)	Length
1.	"Chika Ideal"	Martha Pesante	Rafi Mercenario	3:02
Total length:				3:02

== Personnel ==
Adapted from album's liner notes.

- Executive Production – Goguito "Willy" Guadalupe, Omar Navarro
- Co-Executive Production – "La Diva" Ivy Queen
- Audio Production – Rafi Mercenario
- Musical Production – Rafi Mercenario
- Mastering – Esteban Piñero
- Mixing – Dennis Nieves
- Engineer – Dennis Nieves
- Arranging – Dennis Nieves
- Vocals – Ivy Queen, Noriega
- Recording – Marroneo Studios in Bayamón, Puerto Rico
- Record Label – Universal Music Latino
- Representation – Goguito "Willy" Guadalupe
- Publishing – Perfect Image Music Publishing/EMI 2004
- Photography – Dr. Mannix Guillaera
- Footwear – Steve Maden from Plaza Las Américas in San Juan, Puerto Rico
- Graphic Art – MusicDesign

== See also ==
- List of awards and nominations received by Ivy Queen
