= Dile (automobile) =

Defunct American motor vehicle manufacturer

- Industry: Automobiles
- Founded: 1914
- Defunct: 1915 or 1916
- Fate: Assets sold to Dile Motor Co; later sold to Belmont Motor Corp
- Headquarters: Reading, PA

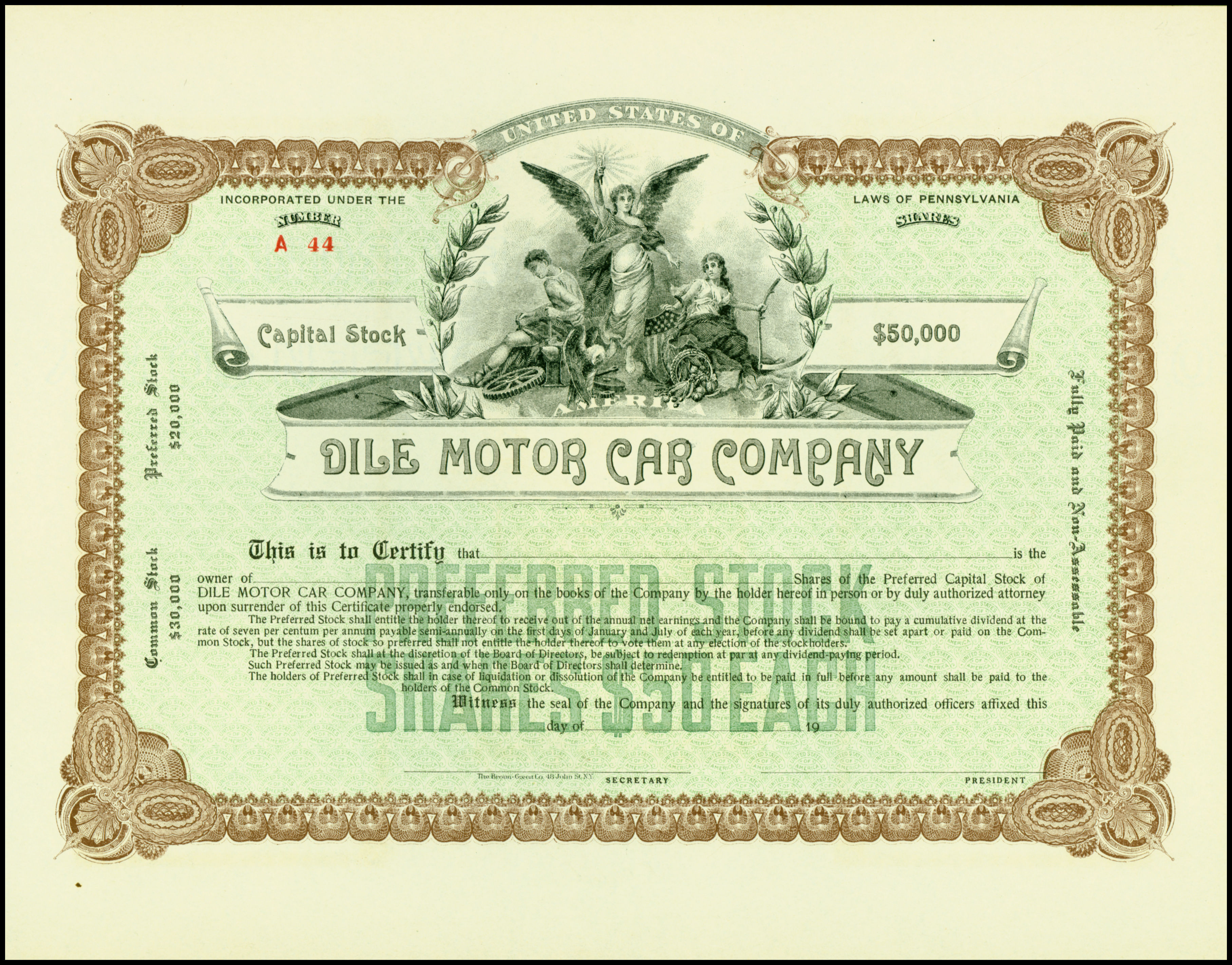
Unissued share of the Dile Motor Car Company

The Dile was an American automobile manufactured in Reading, Pennsylvania from 1914 until 1916. Marketed as "distinctively individual", it sold for $485 (equivalent to $15,589 in 2025).

== History ==
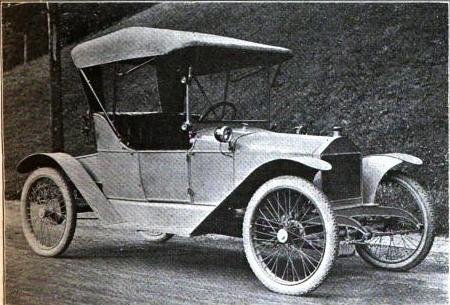
1914 Dile

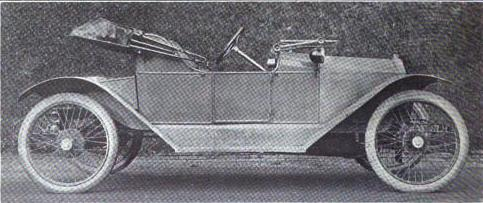
1914 Dile Side

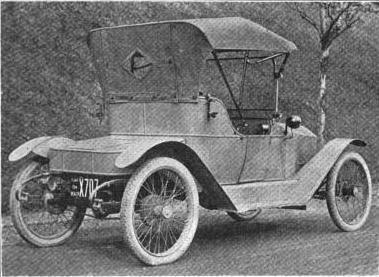
1914 Dile Rear

Dile Motor Company was incorporated in early 1914 or late 1913 with a capitalization of $20,000. The factory was located in the former four story Deppen Brewery Building, at the corner of Tenth and Chestnut Street in Reading PA. Plans were for a small initial workforce and by March 1 to begin production and have a much larger staff with a goal of having over 150 workers. Initial production goals were for 5 cars per day. The incorporators were Frank K. Dick, Margaret K. Dick, and Irwin D. Lengel. The plan was to manufacture a light four cylinder car for $450 on a 96-inch wheelbase. A roadster body was the only style offered. In the middle of 1914 capitalization was increased from $20,000 to $50,000.

On December 28,1915 the Dile Motor Car Company would transfer all of its assets to a new company incorporated in Delaware. The new firm, called the "Dial Motor Company", was owned by the same stockholders as the old company and was capitalized at $400,000. The original company at the time of the sale was in debt some $11,000 to various creditors. This sales of assets was reportedly done to avoid paying creditors. The new company would become bankrupt in August 1916 with liabilities of $15,000 and assets of $10,000.

In 1918 Belmont Motor Corp would purchase all of the remaining cars, materials, trademarks, patents and other assets along with the assets of the Reading Chassis & Motor Co.

=== Promotions ===
In January 1915 a showroom was opened by the Shears Sales Corporation of 30 Church street New York. The showroom was located at Lexington Avenue near 42nd street. On opening day the agency was flooded by potential buyers who would stop to watch demonstrations or view the showroom. The secretary and engineer for the Dile, Irving D. Lengel, was present for the first week that the showroom was open.

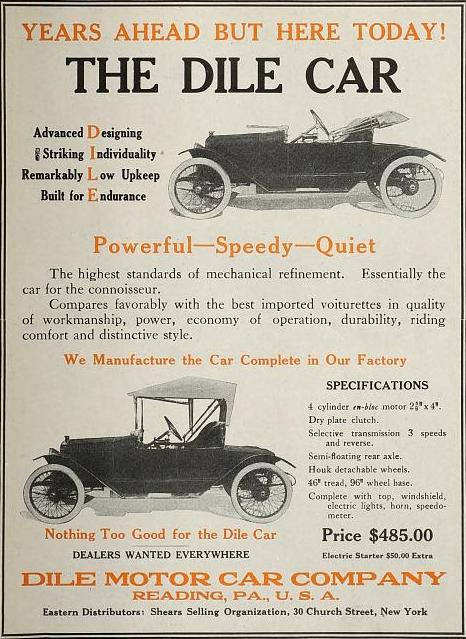
1915 Dile Car Ad

Between October 10-17, 1914 Dile would display their car at the first annual "Cyclecar and Light Show"; which was a show put on by the Manufacturers' and Dealers' Cyclecar Association". The exhibition was at the Horticultural Hall in Boston Massachusetts. On display was their 1915 model.

=== The Dile Car ===
The car was never given a name. It was almost exclusively referred to as "The Dile Car", although internally it went by the name "Model A" The car was a four-cylinder roadster making between 18-20HP in 1915 and 12HP in 1916. It sold for $485. The engine was made in house through the use of specialty machines. The car was offered with a three speed transmission that had a reverse. The car was unusual in that the hand crank had a mechanism for making it higher and easier to reach than what would be found normally on a car this size. Advertisements listed "luxurious cushions, upholstered in "muleskin"". The car weighed 950 pounds. and appears to have electric lights and a kerosene taillight.

A Model B 5 5assenger touring car is mentioned in trade journals in April 1916 making 18HP and costing $785, but no evidence or advertising can be found of what the car looked like or if it was ever made.
