= Gran Omar =

Puerto Rican rapper

- Birth name: Omar Jose Navarro
- Also known as: El Gran Omar
- Born: Toa Baja, Puerto Rico
- Origin: New York City, U.S.
- Genres: Reggaeton; hip hop
- Occupations: Rapper; singer; record producer
- Years active: 1993–present
- Labels: Real Music Group (2003–2004); Universal Latino (2004); Filtro Musik (2005–2006); Go! Records (2008-present)

Omar Jose Navarro, known professionally as Gran Omar, is a Puerto Rican rapper, singer, and record producer. He has received production and writing on credits on various albums between 1996 and 2006 by Ivy Queen his former wife. These albums including En Mi Imperio (1996), The Original Rude Girl (1998), Diva (2003), Real (2004) and Flashback (2005). These albums have been met with commercial and critical success within the Latin community. Several singles from these albums have featured Gran Omar including "Quiero Saber" and "Guillaera" among others. They met while in the all-male hip-hop group "The Noise".

== Career ==
Ivy Queen featuring Gran Omar "Guillaera" (2004)
A 24-second sample of "Guillaera", a duet with Ivy Queen, explains what type of man she does and does not desire.

He received his first single release writing credit on Ivy Queen's debut single "In The Zone" featuring Wyclef Jean in 1998. The song peaked at #38 on the Billboard Rhythmic Top 40 chart. He also received production credits on Queen's third and fourth studio albums: Diva (2003) and Real (2004). Diva peaked at #24 on the Billboard Top Latin Albums chart. On the Billboard Top Heatseekers (South Atlantic) chart, the album peaked at #8. On the Billboard Reggae Albums chart, the album peaked at #4. On the Billboard Tropical Albums chart, the album peaked at #1, spending four nonconsecutive weeks at the top with a total of 86 weeks on the chart, becoming the eighth best-selling Tropical Album of 2004. While, Real, on the Billboard Top Latin Albums chart, peaked at #25, one position higher than Diva. On the Reggae Albums chart, the album peaked at #4, her highest peak on the chart with Diva reaching the same position, while spending a total of 17 consecutive weeks on the chart. On the Billboard Tropical Albums chart, the album peaked at #6, not being able to reach Diva's peak position of #1. Flashback, a retrospective of Queen's previous hits along with a few new ones featured "Quiero Saber" which is credited to Gran Omar. In its first week of release, Flashback scanned 5000 sales; however failed to debut on the Billboard 200. As of March 2007, the album has scanned over 104,000 sales in the United States and Puerto Rico alone. It was able to break their peak at #24 on the Billboard Top Latin Albums chart when it reached #10. On Billboard Top Heatseekers chart, the album reached #7. It reached #2 on both the Billboard Top Heatseekers for the Pacific and South Atlantic areas. It reached #3 on the Billboard Latin Rhythm Albums becoming their debut on the newly instated chart. After this chart was instated, it was revealed that reggaetón albums could no longer appear on the Billboard Reggae Albums and Billboard Tropical Albums charts, deeming Flashback ineligible. Omar is credited with the following songs: "Baila Así", "Dee Jay", the fourth single from Diva "Guillaera", "Matando", "Money Making", and the second single from Tony Touch's album The ReggaeTony Album: "Saca La Semilla". Following his divorce from Ivy Queen in 2005 and their nine-year marriage, he formed a reggaeton/hip-hop group with Rey Severo releasing one album to date Materéal (2007) on Go! Records. A year later, Navarro stated that Queen owed him money from the sales and production of the album Cosa Nostra: Hip-Hop, which they presented together due to their obligations and contract with Univision. Queen denied the claims. No legal action was taken, however.

== Discography ==
=== Studio albums ===
- 2007: Materéal (with Ray Severo)

=== Compilation albums ===
- 2006: Cosa Nostra: Hip Hop (with Ivy Queen)
