= Mexicano 777 =

Puerto Rican rapper

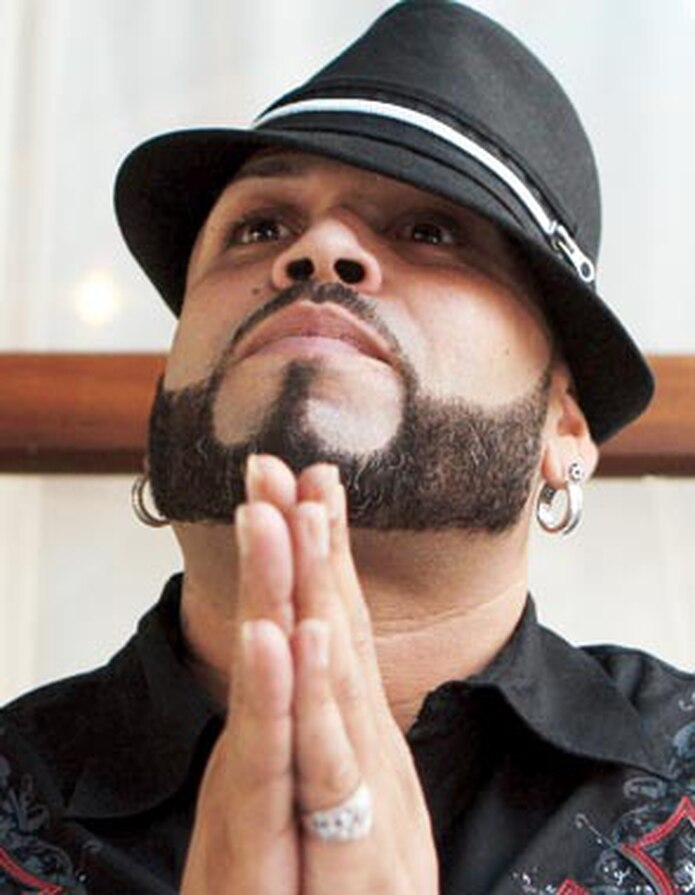

Background information
- Born: Israel Perales Ortiz; September 1, 1972; Yabucoa, Puerto Rico
- Died: July 23, 2015 (aged 42) Manatí, Puerto Rico
- Genres: Latin hip hop; Puerto Rican hip-hop; reggaeton
- Occupation: Rapper
- Years active: 1995–2010

Israel Perales Ortiz (September 1, 1972 – July 23, 2015), better known by his stage name Mexicano 777, was a Puerto Rican rapper who gained fame across Latin America, and in the United States. Mexicano 777 was from Yabucoa, Puerto Rico, and was considered to be one of the pioneers of Latin hip hop and reggaeton.

== Career beginnings ==
His ability to sing was unveiled by parents and siblings when Perales went to take a shower and began to sing. As he came out of the bathroom everyone was waiting in front of the door asking how he had learned the songs he was singing (those of Pedrito Fernández). All this happened when Perales was just six years old. At this young age he was already to duplicate the voice of Fernandez. Therefore after, the young singer began taking part in various school activities such as plays, recitals, musicals. Soon after people would start calling him by his nickname "Mexicano".

== 1990s ==
Mexicano 777 began his musical career during the early 1990s, alongside such artists as DJ Playero and DJ Adam. First with Adam he wrote "Se Testigo" and won the "Best New Style Award". During this time, hip hop in Puerto Rico was at a popular high, and artists from this era included Mexicano 777, Vico C, Eddie Dee, Don Chezina, and MC Ceja.

In 1993, Perales Ortiz allegedly participated in an armed robbery of a Fajardo restaurant, in which he was accused of pulling a firearm on employees and taking off with $2,000 dollars in cash.

In 1996, his hit "Desde La Isla De La Muerte" formed part of the "Guatauba" release in New York together with Tony Touch, one of the most known hispanic DJs. He would later make a music video for said song.

In 1997, his song "Razor Sharp" together with Curly y Demus from Boricua Guerrero The E.P. opened the door for the international market. The song was a major hit and the video is noted for its high production value for that era. The track, often found in Reggaeton retrospectives, solidified his reputation in the genre.

On June 22, 1997, Mexicano 777 was at a discothèque when a shooting took place. He held 19 year old Laura Isabel Aponte Rivera in his hands and prayed before she was taken to a hospital, where she died of a gunshot to the head. Aponte Rivera's mother Myra Rivera credited Mexicano 777 with helping her see her daughter at the hospital before she died.

Mexicano 777 directed the music videos for his songs from his debut album, "Entre El Bien y El Mal" (Between Good and Evil) such as "Bendición Mami," "Hagan Ruido Las Pistolas," and "Un Alma Inocente,". Which reached an all time high popularity. Mexicano 777 was later named "Rap Artist of the Year" in Puerto Rico. "Entre El Bien y El Mal" Released on October 23, 1998 sold 50,000 copies in Puerto Rico and the United States. Mexicano 777 was the best MC produced by DJ Playero. Mexicano 777 made it when it couldn't in the times of the Cassettes and when it was illegal underground, having against the government, the police and the churches.

== 2001 ==
Released on March 13, 2001, Mexicano 777's second album, God's Assassins, was a major Latin hip-hop and reggaeton success, selling 200,000 records. The album is noted for its gritty, hardcore lyrical style.

Also in 2001, he released "El Colmo de los Fujitivos" ("The Last of the Fugitives"). The album was famously recorded and released while Mexicano was a fugitive from the law, with several tracks sharing similarities to his album God's Assassins

In 2005, Mexicano 777 released "Pa' La Kalle 1972-The Beginning" ("To The Streets 1972-The Beginning"), which was released under the Universal Music Latino label. On this CD, he had collaborations with Ivy Queen (on a major hit named "Madre No Llores"-"Mother, Don't Cry")

In 2008, Mexicano 777 returned to the music charts in Puerto Rico with "Septimo Elemento" ("Seventh Element").

== 2010s ==
It was during 2010 that Mexicano 777 was initially diagnosed with throat and tongue cancer.

In 2011 after a successful throat and tongue cancer surgical operation. Mexicano 777 performed in Chile at the Teatro Caupolican sold out arena.

Mexicano 777 was diagnosed with throat and tongue cancer again in 2013.

Early in 2013, Mexicano 777's pregnant daughter, 21-year-old Edith Noemi Perales Aguirre, was found by her 16-year-old brother, murdered. Late in September 2013, two Fajardo residing brothers were arrested by police on suspicion of her murder as well as those of two local men.

Mexicano 777, who was at a Hogares Crea rehabilitation center in Arecibo at the time, vowed to avenge his daughter's death and escaped the rehab center on May 22, but he was caught soon after and was sentenced to three years in prison to be spent in Bayamon. Mexicano 777 had been at Hogares Crea after being sentenced to three years of probation, charged with domestic abuse.

== Death ==
On June 1, 2015, Mexicano 777 was released after his sentence was reduced by one year so he could spend his final days with his family. He moved to his father's house in Manati, where he died from cancer on July 23. He was buried at Cementerio Viejo Municipal de Manatí in Manatí, Puerto Rico.

== See also ==
- List of Puerto Ricans
