= Eliel =

Eliel is a Hebrew name. It can be translated to English as "My God is God".

The name is formed from two different Hebrew terms for God. Eli, meaning "my God" and El "God". Therefore, the commonly understood meaning of the name is "my God God" or "my God is God".

== People named Eliel ==
- Ernest L. Eliel, an organic chemist
- Eliel Lazo, Cuban musician
- Eliel Löfgren, Swedish politician
- Eliel Mickelsson, Finnish captain and politician
- Eliel (producer), Puerto Rican producer
- Eliel Peretz, Israeli footballer
- Eliel Saarinen, Finnish architect
- Eliel Soisalon-Soininen, Finnish politician
- Eliel Swinton, actor and American football player
- Eliel (footballer, born 1969), Eliel Henrique dos Santos, Brazilian footballer
- Eliel (footballer, born 2001), Eliel da Silva, Brazilian footballer
- Eliel (footballer, born 2003), Eliel Chrystian Pereira Silva, Brazilian footballer

== See also ==
- Names of God in Judaism
