= In the Zone (song) =

1999 Ivy Queen/Wyclef Jean song

Single by Ivy Queen featuring Wyclef Jean

from the album The Original Rude Girl
- Released: February 9, 1999
- Recorded: 1997
- Genre: Hip hop
- Length: 4:13
- Label: Sony Discos
- Songwriters: Martha Pesante, Wyclef Jean, Omar Navarro, Deborah Castillero, Aaron King
- Producer: DJ Nelson

Ivy Queen singles chronology
"Al Escuchar Mí Coro" (1998)	"In the Zone" (1999)	"Ritmo Latino" (2000)

Wyclef Jean singles chronology
"Another One Bites the Dust" (1998)	"In the Zone" (1999)	"New Day" (1999)

"In the Zone" is a song by Puerto Rican recording artist Ivy Queen featuring Haitian rapper Wyclef Jean. It was composed by Queen, Jean, Deborah Castillero, Aaron King and Omar Navarro and released on February 9, 1999, as the lead single from her second studio album The Original Rude Girl (1998). The song is a hip hop track.

The collaboration with Wyclef Jean helped elevate Ivy Queen's status and expose her to American audiences. An accompanying music video was also shot and released. It was directed by Jeff Kennedy and produced by George Barnes. A remix version was also recorded and included on the album featuring extra verses from both Queen and Jean. The song managed to chart at number 38 on the Billboard Rhythmic Top 40.

== Background ==
In 1998, while Wyclef Jean was touring Puerto Rico, Ivy Queen attended one of his concerts. Wyclef then sent an invitation for fans to come up on stage if they thought they could flow. With encouragement from friends, Queen gained the courage to go up on stage. Her singing and rapping ability amazed Wyclef and they collaborated on a track in the studio, thus "In The Zone" was born.

== Composition ==
Ivy Queen "In The Zone" (1999)
A 24-second sample of the lead single from the album, "In The Zone", which exposed Queen to larger American audiences.

"In The Zone" was written by Ivy Queen, Wyclef Jean, Omar Navarro, known artistically as Gran Omar, Deborah Castillero and Aaron King. Gran Omar was Queen's then-husband at the time. The song was recorded at The Hit Factory in New York City. It is a hip hop song, which is a departure from the musical styles of reggaeton featured on her debut effort. Queen's verses are sung in Spanish, and Jean's verses are sung in English. However, Queen can be heard speaking English as well such as in the chorus where Jean says "Ayo, where you from Ivy Queen" where she replies with "Puerto Rico, one time". The official release features five tracks. The first is a dance remix of the song while the second is the Album version. The third track is a salsa version produced by DJ Nelson. A hip hop remix by King Saphreem is track number four while the a cappella is track five. According to Patricia Meschino of the Miami New Times the song was a solid collaboration with Jean which introduced her to a new audience.

== Release and promotion ==
Following the album's fourth quarter release on December 15, 1998, Ivy Queen embarked on a tour shortly after throughout Puerto Rico and the United States. The song was released February 9, 1999. An accompanying music video was also shot and released. It was directed by Jeff Kennedy and produced by George Barnes. A second music video was filmed and directed by Gabriel Goldberg. A remix version was also recorded and included on the album featuring extra verses from both Queen and Jean. A second single, "Ritmo Latino" featuring Victor Vargas and WepaMan was also released in 1999.

The album was reissued by Sony Discos on August 25, 1999 with an alternate remix of "In The Zone" as the closing track. In August 1998, she performed at Disney Beach Club Resort along with other artists from the Sony Discos label over the course of three days. She appeared at the 1999 Latin Alternative Music Conference before she became famous and was questioned as to why she was there. The founder, Thomas Cookman responded in her defense with "because she's valid".

== Track listing ==
- CD Single

No.	Title	Writer(s)	Producer(s)	Length
1.	"In The Zone (Diaz Brothers' Radio Mix)"	Martha I. Pesante, Wyclef Jeanelle Jean, Omar Navarro	Diaz Brothers	4:07
2.	"In The Zone (Original Flow Mix)"	Pesante, Jean, Navarro	DJ Nelson	4:13
3.	"In The Zone (King Sahpreem Remix)"	Pesante, Jean, Navarro	King Sahpreem	3:35
4.	"In The Zone (Latinezz Version)"	Pesante, Jean, Navarro	DJ Nelson	3:42
5.	"In The Zone (A'cappella)"	Pesante, Jean, Navarro	DJ Nelson	3:21
Total length:				18:97

== Credits and personnel ==
- Credits adapted from single's liner notes

Track One — Brother's Radio Mix

- Produced and mixed by: Luis Diaz and Hugo Boss for Diaz Bros. Productions.
- Recorded and mixed at: Extreme Music Studios, Miami, Florida

Track Two — Original Flow Mix

- Produced by: DJ Nelson for Flow Music.
- Musical Director: Omar Navarro
- Engineered and mixed by: Andy Grassi
- Recorded and mixed at: The Hit Factory, New York, New York
- A&R by: Deborah Castillero

Track Three — DJ Sahpreem King Mix

- Produced by: Sahpreem King for Sewer Ratz Productions, Inc. / Perpetual Nod Recordings, Inc.
- Additional production by: Dr. Paul for Chain Gain Productions Inc.

Track Four — Latineez Version

- Produced and mixed by: DJ Nelson for Flow Music Productions
- Congas and guitar by: Georgie Salgado
- Additional percussion and bass by: N. Diaz

== Charts ==
Chart (1999)	Position
US Rhythmic Top 40 (Billboard)	38
