= The Original Rude Girl =

Studio album by Ivy Queen
- Released: December 15, 1998
- Recorded: 1998
- Studio: The Hit Factory (New York City); Holivic (The Bronx)
- Genre: Hip hop
- Length: 46:55
- Language: English, Spanish
- Label: Sony Discos
- Producer: DJ Nelson

Ivy Queen chronology
En Mi Imperio (1997)	The Original Rude Girl (1998)	Diva (2003)

Singles from The Original Rude Girl
- 1. "In The Zone" Released: February 9, 1999; 2. "Ritmo Latino" Released: 1999

The Original Rude Girl is the second studio album by Puerto Rican reggaeton recording artist Ivy Queen released on December 15, 1998, by Sony Discos. It is the follow-up studio album to Queen's debut effort En Mi Imperio released in 1997. The album includes Queen's debut single "In The Zone" featuring Wyclef Jean, which helped to increase the album and Queen's exposure to American audiences.

== Background ==
After the success of her debut studio album En Mi Imperio (1997), which as of February 2004 has sold over 180,000 copies, Ivy Queen was quickly signed to the Sony label and began recording material for her second album. However, due to her inexperience in the music business Queen did not receive any profits from the sales of En Mi Imperio.

In 1998, while Wyclef Jean was touring Puerto Rico, Ivy Queen attended one of his concerts. Wyclef then sent an invitation for fans to come up on stage if they thought they could "flow". With encouragement from her friends, Queen stepped on stage an amazed Jean enough that they later met again in New York to record a song. Following the lawsuit filed against DJ Negro, producer of En Mi Imperio, Sony Discos decided to produce and develop music directly for Queen, as they were unhappy with the work produced by Negro.

== Release and promotion ==
The album was released on December 15, 1998. Ivy Queen embarked on a tour shortly after throughout Puerto Rico and the United States. The lead single, "In The Zone" was released February 9, 1999. An accompanying music video was also shot and released. It was directed by Jeff Kennedy and produced by George Barnes. A second music video was filmed and directed by Gabriel Goldberg. A remix version was also recorded and included on the album featuring extra verses from both Queen and Jean. A second single, "Ritmo Latino" featuring Victor Vargas and WepaMan was also released in 1999.

The album was reissued by Sony Discos on August 25, 1999, with an alternate remix of "In The Zone" as the closing track. In August 1998, she performed at Disney Beach Club Resort along with other artists from the Sony Discos label over the course of three days. She appeared at the 1999 Latin Alternative Music Conference before she became famous and was questioned as to why she was there. The founder, Thomas Cookman responded in her defense with "because she's valid".

== Musical style and composition ==
The album is a bilingual set featuring music from the Hip-Hop genre, a departure from the musical styles of reggaeton featured on her debut effort. "In The Zone" was written by Ivy Queen, Wyclef Jean, and Omar Navarro, known artistically as Gran Omar. Gran Omar was Queen's then-husband at the time. The song is a hip-hop track, like much of the album. Queen's verses and chorus are sung in Spanish, and Jean's verses are sung in English.

== Reception ==
Professional ratings
Review scores
Source	Rating
Allmusic	4.5/5 stars

While the album itself was not successful commercially, "In The Zone" managed to chart at number 38 on the Billboard Rhythmic Top 40. David Jeffries of Allmusic gave the album a 4.5 out of 5 stars providing no review while listing the album as an "Allmusic Pick". The Spanish magazine Remezcla listed the album as one of the most influential Latin music albums released in 1998. According to Patricia Meschino of the Miami New Times the song was a solid collaboration with Jean which introduced her to a new audience.

== Track listing ==
- Standard Edition:

No.	Title	Writer(s)	Producer(s)	Length
1.	"Intro"	Martha Pesante	DJ Nelson	0:31
2.	"Muchas Vienen"	Pesante	DJ Nelson	2:47
3.	"Cuando Escuches Reggae"	Pesante	DJ Nelson	2:45
4.	"In The Zone" (Interlude)	Pesante	DJ Nelson	0:56
5.	"In The Zone" (featuring Wyclef Jean)	Pesante, Wyclef Jean, Omar Nazarro, Deborah Castilerro, Aaron King	DJ Nelson, Dr. Paul, Hugo Boss	4:13
6.	"Uuy... Queena"	Pesante	DJ Nelson	3:04
7.	"La Realidad" (featuring Alex D' Castro)	Pesante, Alex Castro, Domingo Quiñones	DJ Nelson	4:11
8.	"Flashblack" (Interlude)	Pesante	DJ Nelson	1:01
9.	"Flashback"	Pesante	DJ Nelson	3:45
10.	"The King and The Queen" (featuring Don Chezina)	Pesante, Ricardo Garcia	DJ Nelson	2:29
11.	"Ritmo Latino" (Radio Version) (featuring Victor Vargas and Wepaman)	Pesante, Navarro, Victor Vargas, Donahue Vargas	DJ Nelson	4:19
12.	"Sabes Que Tu"	Pesante, Navarro	DJ Nelson	3:18
13.	"Un Trono"	Pesante	DJ Nelson	3:12
14.	"Ritmo Latino" (Long Version) (featuring Victor Vargas and Wepaman)	Pesante, Navarro, Vargas, Vargas	DJ Nelson	6:49
15.	"In The Zone" (King Sahpreem remix; featuring Wyclef Jean)	Pesante, Jean, Navarro, Castilerro, King	King Sahpreem	3:35
Total length:				46:55

== Credits and personnel ==
Adapted from AllMusic

- Hugo Boss – Mixing, Producer
- Don Chezina – Guest Artist
- Alex D' Castro – Guest Artist
- Luis Diaz – Mixing, Producer
- Andy Grassi – Engineer, Mixing
- Ivy Queen – Composer, Primary Artist
- Wyclef Jean – Composer, Guest Artist
- DJ Nelson – Producer
- Omar Navarro – Composer, Director
- Dr. Paul – Producer
- Georgie Salgado – Congas, Guitar
- Danny Vargas – Arranger, Mixing, Producer
- Victor Vargas – Arranger, Mixing, Producer, Background Vocals
- WepaMan – Guest Artist
- Sahpreem King; Remixer
