= En Mi Imperio =

Studio album by Ivy Queen
- Released: September 2, 1997
- Recorded: 1996–1997; San Juan, Carolina
- Genre: Reggaeton, hip hop
- Length: 27:41
- Language: Spanish
- Label: House of Music, Sony International
- Producer: DJ Edwin, DJ Negro, DJ Nelson, Sergio George

Ivy Queen chronology
En Mi Imperio (1997)	The Original Rude Girl (1998)

Singles from En Mi Imperio
- 1. "Como Mujer" Released: August 1997; 2. "Pongan Atencion" Released: September 1997

En Mi Imperio (English: In My Empire) is the debut album by Puerto Rican reggaeton singer-songwriter Ivy Queen released on House of Music Records and distributed by Sony International Records on September 2, 1997. The album gained her the 1997 "People's Favorite Rap Singer" and "Artista '97" awards by Artista Magazine.

As of February 2004, the album has sold over 80,000 copies in the United States and over 100,000 copies in Puerto Rico It, however, has not been certified by the Recording Industry Association of America. The album was released digitally for the first time on April 6, 2016.

== Background ==
When she was eighteen, Queen moved from Añasco, Puerto Rico to San Juan, Puerto Rico, where she met rapper and producer DJ Negro. In 1995, she joined an all-male Puerto Rican group called The Noise, at the invitation of DJ Negro. The group became part of the emerging reggaeton scene.

DJ Negro began producing a series of CDs centered on The Noise. Queen made her first appearance on the fifth installment of the CD series on a track called "Somos Raperos Pero No Delincuentes". She became tired of the violent and sexual themes often used in reggaeton, and wished to write about a wider variety of subjects. DJ Negro convinced Queen to go solo, and in 1996 she began recording material for her debut studio album.

== Recording and production ==
Recording sessions for the album began in early 1996. The album was recorded at The Noise Studios and Centro De Bella Artes (Luis A. Ferré Performing Arts Center), both in San Juan, Puerto Rico. Production for En Mi Imperio was handled by Sergio George and DJ Nelson, the latter who also mixed, edited, and mastered the album. DJ Negro served as the executive producer for the album. Limite 21 performed orchestra for the album.

It features collaborations with Gran Omar on "Mi Vida Eres Tú", "Qué Locura", "Representan", Camaleón on "Novatos" and Notty Boy, Memo and Vale, also on "Representan". The remaining six tracks and interlude track are performed by Queen and all of the tracks were composed by her. The album's artwork was done by LionGrafik. On the album's title, En Mi Imperio, (In My Empire), Queen makes a claim to cultural citizenship in the male dominated genre of reggaeton, according to Puerto Rican scholar Lorna Salaman. A music video for "Pongan Atencion" was filmed in Spanish Harlem and was directed by Ozzie Forbes in 1997. It departs from Queen's usual appearances in music videos filmed within the island of Puerto Rico.

== Musical composition ==
"Como Mujer", ("As a Woman"), the album's lead single, was composed in minor key tonality and takes influences from Afro-Latin sources. Musically, the song features synthetic instrumentation and Puerto Rican roots while lyrically, the song features social or political themes. On "Pongan Atención", Queen lyrically demands that she be heard on a local and national level. She sings, "Pongan atencion, pais, nacion, asociacion, que ya llego la queen", ("Pay attention, country, nation, association, the queen has arrived").

== Reception ==
Professional ratings
Review scores
Source	Rating
Allmusic	3/5 stars

An editor for Allmusic awarded the album three out of five stars. The album gained her the 1997 "People's Favorite Rap Singer" and "Artista '97" awards by Artista Magazine.

As of February 2004, the album has sold over 80,000 copies in the United States, and over 100,000 copies in Puerto Rico. It, however, has not been certified by the Recording Industry Association of America. The album's two singles, "Como Mujer" and "Pongan Atencion" were certified Gold and Platinum due to excellent sales, according to the Lakeland Ledger. In 2004, Queen revealed that she did not receive any profits from the album's sales due to her inexperience in the music business.

== Track listing ==
All songs produced by DJ Nelson, except where noted.

No.	Title	Writer(s)	Producer(s)	Length
1.	"Como Mujer"	Martha Pesante		3:41
2.	"Lord Had Mercy"	Pesante		2:58
3.	"Si Tú Cantas"	Pesante		3:11
4.	"Mi Vida Eres Tú" (featuring Gran Omar)	Pesante, Omar Navarro	Sergio George	4:23
5.	"Interlude"	Pesante		1:11
6.	"The Rude Girl"	Pesante		2:43
7.	"Pongan Atención"	Pesante		3:36
8.	"Novatos" (featuring Camaleón)	Pesante, Camalion Hernandez		1:48
9.	"Échate Para Atrás"	Pesante		0:51
10.	"Qué Locura" (featuring Gran Omar)	Pesante, Navarro		1:16
11.	"Representan" (featuring Gran Omar, Notty Boy, Memo and Vale)	Pesante, Navarro		2:03
Total length:				27:41

== Credits ==
Credits are taken from En Mi Imperio liner notes.

- Notty Boy – featured artist
- Camaleón – featured artist
- DJ Edwin – mixing, mastering, editing
- Sergio George – music production
- Limite 21 – orchestra
- LionGrafik – artwork
- Omar Navarro – composer
- DJ Negro – executive production
- DJ Nelson – music production, mixing, mastering, editing
- Memo – featured artist
- Gran Omar – featured artist
- Martha Pesante – composer, lyrics
- Ivy Queen – primary artist, vocals
- Vale – featured artist
