= Rafy Mercenario =

- Origin: Puerto Rico
- Genres: Reggaeton
- Instrument(s): Drum Machine, synthesizer, sequencer, Fl Studio, electric guitar, electric keyboard
- Years active: 2001–present
- Labels: Flow Music, Universal Music Latino

Rafy Mercenario is a Puerto Rican reggaeton producer. He has produced hits for several artists including Tego Calderón, Daddy Yankee, Don Omar and Ivy Queen.

He has released compilation albums, including a collaboration with fellow producer DJ Nelson, The Kings of the Remix (2006), which debuted at number fourteen on the Billboard Latin Rhythm Albums chart.

== Musical career ==
Rafy Mercenario has a long history in the genre, but it was in 2003 when he decided to join Oscar Lebron, better known as DJ Kalin, and they proposed to make a new group within the reggaeton genre, which they named the "Marroneo Crew."

In 2005, Mercenario produced the four new studio tracks on Puerto Rican singer Ivy Queen's fifth studio/compilation release Flashback. At this time, he had become "the most highly requested producer in reggaetón". The tracks included the lead single "Cuentale" and the second single "Libertad", which peaked at number three and thirteen, respectively on the Billboard Latin Songs chart.

Rafy also co-produced the album El Abayarde with Tego Calderón, incorporating rhythms such as salsa and reggaeton with Tego's own style of hip-hop. "Pa Que Retozen", a single from this album co-produced with DJ Joe, was listed in position 34 by Rolling Stone as one of the most important Latin pop songs from 1950 to the present.

In 2008, Rafy Mercenario was in charge of producing the remix "Somos de Calle", the official theme of the Daddy Yankee film, "Talento de Barrio".

With the concept “Reggaeton Old School”, he was part of the cast of the Latin American tour along with Alberto Stylee, Guelo Star, Don Chezina, Maicol Super Star, MC Ceja, Polaco, Lito, Ranking Stone, among others, will also feature some of the DJs who made the advancement of the underground genre possible such as DJ Nelson, DJ Playero, DJ Negro, DJ Blass, Nico Canada, DJ Davey and DJ Adam.

== Discography ==
Adapted from Allmusic:

=== Compilation albums ===
- 2003: Kakoteo Mix (with DJ Nelson)
- 2005: Digital Reggaeton Pistas
- 2005: Reggaeton Beats, Vol. 1
- 2006: No Mercy
- 2006: The Kings of the Remix (with DJ Nelson)
- 2006: Mundo Demente

=== Production discography ===
- 2002: A Mover (DJ Joe)
- 2003: Sandungueo.com: Reggaeton Hits, Vol. 1 (Various Artists)
- 2003: Pina... the Company: Los Mas Duros (Various Artists)
- 2003: La Confrontacion (Various Artists)
- 2003: Innovando (DJ Anqueira)
- 2003: Fuera de Serie (Lito & Polaco)
- 2003: Conspiracion, Vol. 2: La Secuela (Various Artists)
- 2004: Diva Platinum Edition (Ivy Queen)
- 2004: 12 Discípulos (Eddie Dee)
- 2004: Vida Escante (Nicky Jam)
- 2004: The Noise, Vol. 10: The Last Noise (The Noise)
- 2004: Sabotage (Master Joe & O.G. Black)
- 2004: Reggaeton Mixtape, Vol. 1 (Various Artists)
- 2004: Real (Ivy Queen)
- 2004: Motivando a la Yal (Zion & Lennox)
- 2004: Los Narcomujeriegos (Various Artists)
- 2004: La Pelicula (Various Artists)
- 2004: Jamz TV Hits, Vol. 2 (Various Artists)
- 2004: Guatuaba Mixtape (Various Artists)
- 2004: Guatuaba Mixtape, Vol. 2 (Various Artists)
- 2004: Flow la Discoteka (DJ Nelson)
- 2004: Evolucion Arrestada (Mikey Perfecto)
- 2004: Entrando Al Juego (Trivales)
- 2004: El Que Habla Con Las Manos (Eliel)
- 2004: Contra La Corriente (Noriega)
- 2004: Chosen Few II: El Documental (Boy Wonder)
