= Flashback (Ivy Queen album) =

Studio album / compilation album by Ivy Queen
- Released: October 4, 2005
- Recorded: 1995–2005
- Genres: Reggaetón, hip hop
- Length: 60:02
- Language: Spanish
- Labels: Univision, Filtro
- Producers: Goguito "Willy" Guadalupe (exec.), Ivy Queen (co-exec.), Luny Tunes, Master Chris, Noriega, DJ Buddha, DJ Nelson, Iván Joy, Tempo, Don Omar, Gran Omar, Rafi Mercenario, DJ Adam, DJ Eric, DJ Joe, DJ Negro

Ivy Queen chronology
Real (2004)	Flashback (2005)	Sentimiento (2007)

Singles from Flashback
- 1. "Cuéntale" Released: September 24, 2005; 2. "Te He Querido, Te He Llorado" Released: November 26, 2005; 3. "Libertad" Released: February 4, 2006

Flashback is the fifth studio album by Puerto Rican reggaetón recording artist Ivy Queen, released on October 4, 2005 through Univision and on September 15, 2007 as Greatest Hits in Germany and Spain. It is often considered as a studio-compilation release due to the amount of the album being previously released material. Queen began working on Flashback after the moderate success of Real in early 2005. Featuring content dating back to 1995, when she was still a part of the all-male group The Noise, the album includes four new pieces of work all produced by Rafi Mercenario, the genre's most requested record producer at the time.

The four tracks were written and recorded after the end of Queen's nine-year marriage to Omar Navarro, months before the album's release. Lyrically, the remaining sixteen tracks tell stories of female empowerment, love and heartbreak and sociopolitical criticism. Following an international tour of South America which began in 2004 and presentations in the United States, Ivy Queen partnered with the co-founder of Perfect Image Records, José Guadalupe, to form her own record label Filtro Musik and signed a distribution deal with Univision Music Group in 2005. She was previously signed to Guadalupe's independent label Perfect Image Records which was distributed by Universal Music Latino. The Flashback Tour was launched in September 2005 to promote the album.

It spawned three singles, "Cuéntale", "Te He Querido, Te He Llorado", and "Libertad", all of which reached the Top 10 of various Latin charts in the United States. Commercially successful in the Latin market, the album peaked at number ten on the Billboard Top Latin Albums chart, becoming her highest peak on that chart, until 2007 when her sixth studio album reached number four. Despite selling 5,000 copies in its first week, it failed to debut on the Billboard 200. It also reached number seven on the Billboard Top Heatseekers chart, number two on both the Billboard Top Heatseekers (Pacific) and Billboard Top Heatseekers (South Atlantic) chart. It reached number three on the newly instated Billboard Latin Rhythm Albums chart, making the album ineligible for the Tropical Albums and Reggae Albums charts, which had previously been dominated by Queen.

The album was met with generally positive reviews from music critics, who praised its lyrical content and musical production whilst some noticed that Queen's 1998 duet with Haitian rapper Wyclef Jean, "In The Zone", was missing from the track list. Critics also noted that there was scarce new material to be found on the album, but complimented the album's track list. It became one of the best-selling reggaetón albums of 2005 along with Real, when sales of both albums went "through the roof". This gained Queen several nominations for awards. At the Billboard Latin Music Awards 2006, it was nominated for "Reggaetón Album of the Year" and for "Urban Album of the Year" at the Premio Lo Nuestro 2007 award ceremony. It received a nomination for "Compilation Album of the Year" at the 2007 People's Choice Reggaetón and Urban Awards.

== Background ==
Following the commercial failure of her first two studio albums, Queen was dropped from the Sony label, and subsequently took a hiatus from her music career in 1999. Beginning in 2001, Queen began appearing on other artists' reggaetón compilation albums from which many of the songs on this release originate. Queen returned to the music industry with her highly anticipated third studio album, Diva, which was critically acclaimed and later recognized as a factor in reggaeton's mainstream exposure in 2004 along with Daddy Yankee's Barrio Fino and Tego Calderon's El Enemy de los Guasíbiri. Diva was later certified Platinum by the Recording Industry Association of America. She then began working on her fourth studio album Real. It too was a commercial success, albeit to a lesser extent, despite initially being Queen's debut full-length English-language studio album. She then embarked on the "Reggaeton Tour 2004" which also featured other artist such as Aldo Ranks and La Factoria. The tour touched upon various South American countries, including her first in Ecuador, where she performed songs such as "Papi Te Quiero" and "Tu No Puedes" to promote both Diva and Real. This followed presentations in Atlanta, Brooklyn, and New York City, where she was designated as the "Puerto Rico Youth God Mother of the National Puerto Rican Day Parade" in June 2004.

In June 2005, Ivy Queen partnered with co-founder of Perfect Image Records, José Guadalupe to form Filtro Musik. This stemmed from Guadalupe parting ways with the other co-founder of Perfect Image, Anthony Pérez who in turn would launch his own label The Roof Records. Filtro Musik's concept initially stemmed from its name which means "filter" in English. Guadalupe explained the title, saying "I've been in this industry for 15 years now, and we have the ability to filter and pick the best". In the coming year, Univision Music Group signed the label to licensing plan to release the album in September 2005, which ensured that the "album was positioned in Latin and mainstream accounts that would normally not carry Latin product." Ivy Queen was previously married to fellow reggaeton artist Omar Navarro, known by his stage name Gran Omar. They were divorced in 2005 shortly before the release of Flashback, which influenced the composition of the album. She denied ever having found him in the act of adultery, while claiming that if she had found Navarro with another woman, she'd be in La Vega Alta, a prison for women in Puerto Rico. She also denied rumors that she had physically assaulted the woman she caught with Navarro. She stated they had not lived with each other for two months citing the "extensive travels of her husband and his workload of being a producer" as being causes to the end of the nine-year marriage.

== Songs and repertoire ==
Ivy Queen "Cuéntale" (2005)
An 18 second sample of the lead single "Cuéntale". The song address her lover letting him know that Queen wants him to pick between her and his wife.

Flashback is a "fusion of the past, present, and future, consisting of a totally contagious medley of the best hits and entrancing rhythms". The album's repertoire consists of previously released material along with four new melodies. "Cuéntale" ("Tell Her"), the lead single off the album, has Ivy Queen exploring lyrically as she "plays a mistress who tells her lover to pick between her and his wife". She explained "the mistress just gets tired of seeing him for a short time and listening to him complain about his unloving wife". Musically, it features danceable grooves, synthetic instrumentation and synthesizers while taking influences from Afro Latin and reggae music; it is set in minor key. "Marroneo" is the second of four newly produced tracks by Rafi Mercenario, "the most highly requested producer in reggaetón" at the time. It received comparisons to Daddy Yankee's "Gasolina". "Si Una Vez" ("If Once") was originally written by Pete Astudillo along with A.B. Quintanilla III and performed by American singer Selena in 1994 on her album Amor Prohibido. Ivy Queen's interpolation of the lyrics tell a story of a "woman who looks back at a lover and wonders why she even loved the lout who abused her love". She choose to cover "Si Una Vez" over other songs by Selena including "Como La Flor" ("Like The Flower") and "La Carcacha" because it was the one she could identify with the most, being more inline with what Queen stands for; citing Selena as her primary influence. The "reggaetón-ed up twist" on Selena's classic, features bitter-romantic lyrics, synthetic instrumentation and synthesizers, while taking reggae influences similar to the original. "I feel honored to be able to sing one of Selena's songs," Queen explained. "She was the first artist to make a successful crossover before Jennifer Lopez and all the rest." "Libertad" ("Freedom"), the last of the four new tracks on the album was composed in minor key tonality. Queen appears infuriated in the lyrics as the songs takes influences from Afro-Latin music.

Ivy Queen "Muchos Quieren Tumbarme" (1995)
A 12 second sample of "Muchos Quieren Tumbarme" when Queen references a boxing match with the phrase "many want to knock me down".

"La Mala" ("The Bad Girl"), originally featured on Don Omar's reggaetón compilation album Los Bandoleros (2005) as "Según Tú" ("According To You"), employs simple harmonic progressions and synthetic instrumentation. The album, which collectively brought together almost every top name in reggaetón at the time featured only one female artist, Ivy Queen. The song interpolates La Lupe's songs "La Tirana" and "Puro Teatro". The opening verse of "La Mala" directly cites these two songs. Following this, Queen describes "a tumultuous relationship, where Ivy is considered "la mala," where in reality, "the male lover is responsible for its demise." "Te He Querido, Te He Llorado" ("I Have Love, I Have Cried"), the third and final single from Flashback was originally included on Mas Flow 2, a reggaetón compilation album by Luny Tunes. The song is a blend of reggaetón and bachata music known as bachaton or bachateo, a musical movement in the Dominican Republic and Puerto Rico which combines bachata melodies and reggaeton style beats, lyrics, rapping, and disc jockeying. Queen makes use "bachata's signature guitar sound" and "slower more romantic rhythm" while incorporating "bachata's exaggerated emotional singing style" in this song as well as in "La Mala". Composed in major key tonality it features simple harmonic progressions, "angry-romantic" lyrics, Puerto Rican and Caribbean roots and Afro-Latin as well as Caribbean influences according to the Music Genome Project. Lyrically, the song calls for violence and revenge over a former lover. It "evokes the story of Lupe's "Amor Gitano". It begins with Queen "declaring her unwavering love for her partner," later describing him as a "liar, cheater, and abused who made her suffer." Queen threatens her former lover with a dagger, threatening to kill him with it, telling of the horrible life that awaits him. Queen "reverses the typical bolero structure by actively rejecting the assumption that her role as the woman is to suffer, instead imagining that she would inflict particularly violent forms of suffering on her former male lover". "Yo Soy La Queen" ("I Am The Queen"), featured on a mid-1990 installment of The Noise, contains a "speedier rap over a quick-thump hypnotic beat". Taking influence from Caribbean music, roots of Puerto Rican and Caribbean music can be found on the track of only one minute and twenty seconds; the shortest on the album. "Muchos Quieren Tumbarme" ("Many Want To Knock Me Down"), alludes to a boxing match with the phrase "many want to knock me down", and cites female empowerment as a prominent theme in the song. In addition to this, she degrades the thought of women's power being underestimated. She speaks directly to men requesting that they not be cowards. She then argues that women are actively struggling for equality among their male peers, later asserting that "women are coming strong".

Ivy Queen "Miles De Voces" (2001)
A 21 second sample of the hip-hop track "Miles De Voces". Lyrically, Queen challenges men or women to say something to her face if they have a problem with her.

"Al Escuchar Mi Coro" ("Hear My Chorus") and "Reggae Respect" are from the same installment of the album. On the former, Gran Omar accompanies her, while both return to the early styles of "old school reggaetón". "Como Mujer" ("As A Woman"), included on Queen's debut studio album En Mi Imperio (1996) is a sociopolitical themed song. Returning to more modern reggaetón, "Yo Voy Pal Party" ("I'm Going To Party") contains erotic and sensual lyrics in which Queen describes what she wants to do at a party with her lover. Composed in the minor key, roots from various Caribbean countries are prominent on the song. "Quiero Saber" ("I Want To Know"), the second single off of Queen's third studio album Diva (2003), is a duet with Gran Omar. The song was produced by Luny Tunes, Noriega, and DJ Nelson. It was also one of the first songs Luny Tunes produced as a duo when Queen trusted their talent and gave them their first assignment. "Quiero Bailar" ("I Want To Dance"), the lead single off of Diva and Queen's first big hit, incorporates the Liquid riddim, a musical riddim produced by the "Jamaican cross-over guru" Jeremy Harding. The song's lyrics warn her dance partner not to misinterpret her moves. In the song, Queen clears away her partner's misconception that their partnership will lead to sexual relations between them afterwards. "Yo Lamento" ("I Regret"), formerly on Noriega's compilation Contra La Corriente (2004), titled "Amiga No Pienses" ("Friend Do Not Think"), contains modern reggaetón rhythm.

Ivy Queen "Yo Lamento" - Salsa Version (2004)
A 24 second sample of the re-recorded salsa version of "Yo Lamento" which is originally from Noriega's Contra La Corriente (2004) as a reggaetón track.

"En La Disco" ("In The Club"), originally from Escorpiones (2004), features an Arabic-influenced beat infused with reggaetón. Lyrically, Queen assures her lover that if she finds him in the club, she promises to dance with him disregarding what other people have to say about it. She assures him that there will be no other like her. "Miles De Voces" ("Thousands Of Voices"), a hip hop track from Buddha's Family (2001), contains simple harmonic progressions, synthesizers, affronted lyrics and a sociopolitical theme while alternating between major and minor key. "La Abusadora" ("The Abuser") originates from Iván Joy's Diamond Hits (2004). While reviewing the compilation Reggaeton Diamond Hits (2006), Steve Leggett, from Allmusic, named the song the highlight of the album. "Aunque La Distancia" ("Although The Distance") was originally included on the compilation release Romances Del Ruido 2 (2003) by Baby Rasta & Gringo as "Llora Mi Corazón" ("My Heart Cries"). Queen's rap contributes to a hip hop beat accompanied by Gran Omar. It is also known by the name of "Eres Mi Hombre" ("You're My Man"). "Yo Lamento" (Salsa Version), also from Contra La Corriente, is essentially the same track only re-recorded and mixed into salsa with a duration of four minutes and sixteen seconds; the longest on the album and only salsa track. In the song, Queen sings to her friend about loving her friend's man. She tells her that she had never intended to hurt her. Queen assures that she loves her friend, but acknowledges the fact that their friendship was lost. "He looked at me and we started dancing while the music took us away. Dancing, he touched me. My mind wasn't thinking, passion was leading. My friend don't think that I don't love you", she sings.

== Release and promotion ==
The album was released on October 4, 2005 to physical retailers through Univision Records. It was originally slated for release on September 27, 2005. On August 29, 2006, Flashback was released digitally on Machete Music. A television commercial was commissioned to promote it. A year after the standard edition's release, on October 4, 2006, an album by the name of Reggaetón Queen was released in Japan. It featured a similar track list with "Si Una Vez", "Yo Soy La Queen", "Al Escuchar Mi Coro", "Como Mujer", "Voy Pal Party", and "En La Disco" not appearing on the album. Instead, the a cappella version of "Libertad" and its remix instrumental were included. In September 2007, the album was released in Germany and Spain as Greatest Hits. "Cuéntale", "Te He Querido, Te He Llorado", and "Libertad" served as the album's singles. In September 2005, to coincide with the release of "Cuéntale" to radio, she launched The Flashback Tour. The former was released in December 2005 to radio respectively, while the latter was released to radio in February 2006. A CD single of "Libertad" was also released with remixes of the song. On November 14, 2006, a five track extended play (EP) was released featuring the three singles plus "Quiero Saber" and "Quiero Bailar" to digital retailers.

In February 2005, further promoting the album, she appeared at the "Festival of Puerto Rican Stars", which was a historic achievement for reggaetón, as no other performer from the genre was invited to attend the event. In June 2005, she appeared on the "Invasion Del Reggaetón Tour" with Daddy Yankee, which grossed $817,220 for the week of June 18. In September 2005, she headlined the La Kalle 105.9 Block Party concert at Madison Square Garden, which grossed $962,390 for the week of November 19, 2005. She also attended and performed at the Billboard Bash!, the night before the 2005 Billboard Latin Music Awards. She performed "Cuéntale" at the 2005 Premios Juventud. Ivy Queen interpreted "Te He Querido, Te He Llorado" on The Cristina Show on August 8, 2005. In October 2005, it was announced that MTV Networks would launch a "new cable television network devoted to Caribbean music and culture." In conjunction with the launch on November 21, MTV Networks hosted "Caribbean Rising", "a series of concerts featuring performances from more than 80 artists across genres such as reggae, dancehall, reggaeton, hip-hop, and calypso." Queen appeared at the Nevis concert, held on October 30, 2005. She appeared alongside Wyclef Jean, Luciano, and Morgan Heritage, among others. "Te He Querido, Te He Llorado" was also performed at the 2006 edition of the Premios Juventud award ceremony, with Queen being given the honor of performing the grand finale to a televised audience of five million. Two days later, she held her first concert at the Fine Arts Center in Santurce, Puerto Rico, where she recalled her "sojourn from little Añasco, to the Fine Arts Center stage", kissed her new boyfriend, who at the time was DJ Urba, and announced plans to market an Ivy Queen shoe, clothing, and perfume collection.

On the cover of the album, Queen appears in a "low-cut, cleavage-showing little black dress", and is seen wearing various gold bracelets that cover her right eye. Similar to the cover for Real, the look sported by Queen is more sexually provocative. The change in image for Queen is attributed to Universal Latino feeling that the album Real had crossover potential to U.S. mainstream audiences. This is also attributed to Queen responding to the criticism she has received in the past for looking like a tomboy, wearing baggy pants and larger shirts, from the Puerto Rican press, middle class and members of the older generation, a subject Queen addresses in her autobiography, Detrás Del Glamour (Behind Glamour). However, Queen took responsibility for this change in image, which she attributed to a "new growth in person". She confessed the makeover stemmed from a "crisis" and "female vanity". Seeking to recontour her figure, Queen enlisted the help of a Colombian plastic surgeon. Her breast were augmented in July 2004, during a promotional tour of the country. The album cover also features Queen's signature long nails which she sports in a variety of colors; in this case they are light blue and white.

== Commercial performance ==
In its first week of release, Flashback sold over 5000 copies, however failed to debut upon the Billboard 200. As of March 2007, the album has sold over 104,000 copies in the United States and Puerto Rico alone. It became her best-selling album until Sentimiento (2007). It was able to break Queen's peak at number twenty-four on the Billboard Latin Albums chart when it reached number ten. At the time, the album was among few noncompilations releases (aside from Daddy Yankee) that were able to chart on the Billboard Latin Albums chart since the summer of 2005. These included releases by Yaga & Mackie, Angel & Khriz, Tony Touch and Bimbo, with Queen's Flashback being in the best seller of the six. On Billboard Top Heatseekers chart, the album reached number seven. It reached number two on the Billboard Top Heatseekers charts for the Pacific and South Atlantic areas. It reached number three on the Billboard Latin Rhythm Albums becoming her debut on the newly instated chart. After this chart was instated, it was revealed that reggaetón titles could no longer appear on the Billboard Reggae Albums and Billboard Tropical Albums charts, deeming Flashback ineligible for the charts in which Queen had previously appeared on. Still, however, Queen was unable to enter the Billboard 200 until 2007, when her sixth studio album, Sentimiento reached number 105 on the chart.

On the Billboard Hot Latin Songs chart, "Cuéntale" peaked at #3 for the week of November 19, 2005. On the Billboard Latin Rhythm Airplay chart, the song peaked at #4 for the week of November 12, 2012. On the Billboard Latin Tropical Airplay chart, the song reached #1 for the week of November 5, 2005 replacing "Amor De Una Noche" by N'Klabe. It moved 4-1 from the previous week and gave Queen her first #1 on the chart. Only to being succeeded by "Amor De Una Noche" a week later. On the Billboard Bubbling Under Hot 100 chart, the song peaked at #14 for the week ending December 31, 2005. Meaning, the song had potential to chart of the Billboard Hot 100 chart, technically peaking on that chart at #114. "Libertad" peaked at #13 of the Billboard Hot Latin Songs chart for the week of April 6, 2006. On the Billboard Latin Rhythm Airplay chart, the song peaked at #12 for the week of April 1, 2006. On the Billboard Latin Tropical Airplay chart, the song also peaked at #12 for the week of March 25, 2006. On the Billboard Hot Latin Songs chart, "Te He Querido, Te He Llorado debuted at #38 for the week of December 03, 2005 and peaked at #10 for the week of February 04, 2006. The song occupying the ninth spot was "Cuéntale". On the Billboard Latin Pop Airplay chart, the song debuted at #38 on the week of December 03, 2005 being the only other debut that week behind "Yo Voy" by Zion & Lennox featuring Daddy Yankee at #37 and peaked at #26 on the week of January 07, 2006. On the Billboard Hot Latin Songs chart, "Quiero Bailar" debuted at #35 for the week of September 3, 2005, becoming the "Hot Shot Debut" of that week and peaked at #29 for the week of September 17, 2005. While on the Billboard Latin Rhythm Songs chart, it peaked at number eight for the week of October 29, 2005. It debuted under the name "Yo Quiero Bailar" at #37 on the week of December 20, 2003 and peaked at #24 for the issue dated January 17, 2004 on the Billboard Tropical Songs chart. The song re-entered the Billboard Tropical Songs chart under the name "Quiero Bailar" at #36 on the week of March 6, 2004 and peaked at #16 for the week of July 9, 2005. The song became the first Spanish-language track to reach #1 on Miami's WPOW Rhythmic Top 40, an American radio station based in Miami, Florida that does not usually play Spanish music. She explained: "I've worked very hard in my career, but I get surprised because I've never expected to get to these places." She added: "When I read Sony's reports and they tell me out of nowhere that my song is number one, I [got] surprised and look[ed] for explanations."

== Reception ==
Professional ratings
Review scores
Source	Rating
Allmusic	3.5/5 stars
Dominican Times	4.5/5 stars
NewsOK	(favorable)
San Antonio Express-News	5/5 stars
Star Tribune	(favorable)

Flashback was met with generally positive reviews from music critics. Johnathan Widran of Allmusic praised the album giving it a three out of five stars. He started off the reviewing by stating that through the album, Ivy Queen can give insight into reggaeton to a person who is unknown to the genre. While noting that "In The Zone" with Wyclef Jean was missing from the album, he stated that it "has more than enough driving grooves, chunky beats, symphonic atmospheres, and infectious raps to compensate". He noted that the songs "Te He Querido, Te He Llorado, "Yo Soy La Queen", and "Reggae Respect" capture Queen's "irrepressible inspirations, spirit, and vibe". Lastly, he praised "Quiero Bailar" and "En La Disco" as tracks that get the party and people going. An editor for the Star Tribune called the album a "retrospective that also has a few new tunes", later claiming that Queen knows how to "take shots at men". An editor for Newsday said the album "cements her status as the Queen of Reggaetón and Latin hip hop". Wayne Marshall writing for The Phoenix opinionated that the "retrospective of recent hits and career standouts, is a crucial primer on the reigning Queen of reggaeton". Ramiro Burr of the San Antonio Express-News saw the release of Flashback, along with Daddy Yankee's Barrio Fino En Directo (2005) and Don Omar's The Last Don Live (2004) as releases that combine current hits, remixes, live renditions and previously unreleased material, because the artists haven't had time to produce an all-new album due to the genre's demanding status, at the time. An editor for the Dominican Times claimed the album to be "as strong as she [Queen] is" and awarded the album four and a half stars out of five. Natasha Washington from NewsOK claimed the album to cover "Queen's 10-year singing career with 16 classic hits familiar in Latin markets, fresh to the United States," while selecting "Cuentale", "Te He Querido, Te He Llorado", "Si Una Vez", "Marroneo" and "Libertad" as the stand out tracks.

According to Noche Latina's Navani Otero, Queen represented the ladies on Omar's release Los Bandoleros with "Segun Tu", showcasing that "she too is a musical outlaw herself". According to Jesus Trivino of Latina magazine, "Te He Querido, Te He Llorado" is the best song released by Queen during "Reggaetón's Golden Era", which lasted between 2003 until 2007. Ramiro Burr of Billboard stated that "Quiero Bailar" shows how effortlessly and quickly she alternately sings and raps, claiming that she has a distinct vocal style that evokes Gwen Stefani. Kid Curry, PD of Rhythmic Top 40 WPOW (Power 96) cites Ivy Queen's release of "Yo Quiero Bailar" as "the last reggaetón super-hit".

=== Accolades ===
The album along with the singles received multiple nominations for numerous awards. At the 2006 Billboard Latin Music Awards, it was nominated for "Reggaetón Album of the Year". This became her second nomination for the same award twice in a row. At the Premio Lo Nuestro 2007 awards, it was nominated for "Urban Album of the Year". When the 2007 People's Choice Reggaetón and Urban Awards arrived, Queen ended up with three nominations, winning two of them. These were "Female Artist of the Year" and "Song with the Best Elaboration of Lyrics" for "Te He Querido, Te He Llorado". Flashback was nominated for "Compilation Album of the Year". At the Premios Juventud 2005 awards, Queen was nominated for "Voice of the Moment, Female" and "Favorite Urban Artist". At the Premios Juventud 2006 awards, she was again nominated for "Favorite Urban Artist" and awarded the first ever "Diva Award", which honored the singer for her musical career. Queen was awarded "Best Reggaetón Singer" at the 2006 Premios Furia Musical. At the Broadcast Music, Inc. (BMI) Awards of 2007, "Cuéntale" and "Te He Querido, Te He Llorado" were presented "Award-Winning Songs". "Cuéntale" was also nominated for "Best Latin/Reggaetón Track" at the 22nd Annual International Dance Music Awards, which was ultimately won Shakira and Wyclef Jean with their #1 single "Hips Don't Lie".

== Legacy ==
Several tracks on the album have been covered by several artists within the music industry, including two of the album's three singles. Cumbia-pop group La Conquista covered "Cuéntale" on their third studio album Muévelo in 2007. It was released as the album's second single following the title track by Univision Records. It was produced by A.B. Quintanilla III, while Brain "Red" Moore handled additional production including arranging, mixing and mastering. It also samples the beat of the original song. John Witzgall of Allmusic felt it, along with the album was "destined (or even designed?) to be quickly forgotten, which is a shame, because this talented group seems capable of much more campy, danceable fun". "Te He Querido, Te He Llorado" was covered by the Mas Flow Kids, a group of kids similar to Kidz Bop on an album presented by Luny Tunes titled Kids' Flow (2006) named after the duo's compilation album series Mas Flow. The album features "original songs, lyrics and beats produced by Luny Tunes".

Puerto Rican singer Ednita Nazario also covered the song live in concert. It was included on her twenty-second album Apasionada Live (2006). This version of the song peaked at number twenty-three on the Billboard Tropical Songs chart. It was also covered by Dominican singer Yolaime Rodríguez and released as the lead single from her debut studio album Simplemente Yolaime (2011). Combining merengue and urban music, the song is a fusion of Queen's "Te He Querido, Te He Llorado". A music video for the single was also filmed, which was directed by Amable Martinez. It has attained over fifty-thousand of views on the video sharing website YouTube. Mexican singer Reaktor covered the song on her album Hits in 2010. "Quiero Bailar" was covered by Dlaklle on the reggaetón compilation album Reggaetón 30 Pegaditas (2005). Abaya covered "Quiero Bailar" on the album Evolución Urbana (2005). Boricua Boys also included their rendition of the song on their second album Reggaetón (2006). Pop/Rock group "SPS: Salt, Pepper and Suga" covered "Quiero Saber" on their 2005 album Armadas Con El Groove.

== Track listing ==
- Standard edition:

No.	Title	Writer(s)	Producer(s)	Length
1.	"Cuéntale"	Martha Pesante	Rafi Mercenario	3:22
2.	"Marroneo"	Pesante	Rafi Mercenario	3:02
3.	"Si Una Vez"	Pete Astudillo, A.B. Quintanilla	Rafi Mercenario	2:42
4.	"Libertad"	Pesante	Rafi Mercenario	3:29
5.	"La Mala"	Pesante	Rafi Mercenario, Don Omar	3:08
6.	"Te He Querido, Te He Llorado"	Pesante, Francisco Saldaña, Ernesto Padilla	Luny Tunes	4:14
7.	"Yo Soy La Queen"	Pesante	DJ Joe	1:20
8.	"Muchos Quieren Tumbarme"	Pesante	DJ Negro	2:01
9.	"Al Escuchar Mi Coro"	Pesante, Felix Rodríguez	DJ Negro	2:39
10.	"Reggae Respect"	Pesante, Rodríguez	DJ Negro	2:08
11.	"Como Mujer"	Pesante	DJ Negro	3:41
12.	"Yo Voy Pal Party"	Pesante	DJ Eric	2:29
13.	"Quiero Saber" (featuring Gran Omar)	Pesante, Omar Navarro	DJ Nelson, Luny Tunes, Noriega	2:52
14.	"Quiero Bailar"	Pesante, Navarro	Iván Joy	3:03
15.	"Yo Lamento"	Pesante, Norgie Noriega	Noriega, DJ Nelson	2:37
16.	"En La Disco"	Pesante, Saldaña, Victor Cabrera	Luny Tunes, DJ Nelson	3:19
17.	"Miles De Voces"	Pesante	Tempo	3:24
18.	"La Abusadora"	Pesante, Carlos Quiñones, Óscar Calderon	Master Chris	3:04
19.	"Aunque La Distancia" (featuring Gran Omar)	Pesante, Navarro	DJ Adam	3:15
20.	"Yo Lamento" (Salsa Version)	Pesante, Noriega	Noriega, DJ Nelson, Luny Tunes	4:16
Total length:				60:02

CD & DVD – disc 1
No.	Title	Writer(s)	Producer(s)	Length
1.	"Cuéntale"	Martha Pesante	Rafi Mercenario	3:22
2.	"Marroneo"	Pesante	Rafi Mercenario	3:02
3.	"Si Una Vez"	Pete Astudillo, A.B. Quintanilla	Rafi Mercenario	2:42
4.	"Libertad"	Pesante	Rafi Mercenario	3:29
5.	"La Mala"	Pesante	Rafi Mercenario, Don Omar	3:08
6.	"Te He Querido, Te He Llorado"	Pesante, Francisco Saldaña, Ernesto Padilla	Luny Tunes	4:14
7.	"Yo Soy La Queen"	Pesante	DJ Joe	1:20
8.	"Muchos Quieren Tumbarme"	Pesante	DJ Negro	2:01
9.	"Al Escuchar Mi Coro"	Pesante, Felix Rodríguez	DJ Negro	2:39
10.	"Reggae Respect"	Pesante, Rodríguez	DJ Negro	2:08
11.	"Como Mujer"	Pesante	DJ Negro	3:41
12.	"Yo Voy Pal Party"	Pesante	DJ Eric	2:29
13.	"Quiero Saber" (featuring Gran Omar)	Pesante, Omar Navarro	DJ Nelson, Luny Tunes, Noriega	2:52
14.	"Quiero Bailar"	Pesante, Navarro	Iván Joy	3:03
15.	"Yo Lamento"	Pesante, Norgie Noreiga	Noriega, DJ Nelson	2:37
16.	"En La Disco"	Pesante, Saldaña, Victor Cabrera	Luny Tunes, DJ Nelson	3:19
17.	"Miles De Voces"	Pesante	Tempo	3:24
18.	"La Abusadora"	Pesante, Carlos Quiñones, Óscar Calderon	Master Chris	3:04
19.	"Aunque La Distancia" (featuring Gran Omar)	Pesante, Navarro	DJ Adam	3:15
20.	"Yo Lamento" (Salsa Version)	Pesante, Noriega	Noriega, DJ Nelson, Luny Tunes	4:16
Total length:				60:02

CD & DVD – disc 2
No.	Title	Writer(s)	Producer(s)	Length
1.	"Intro"
2.	"Presentación"
3.	"Entrevista"
4.	"Presentación"
5.	"En Vivo En Costa Rica"
6.	"Quiero Saber" (Music video)	Martha Pesante	Noriega, DJ Nelson, Luny Tunes	2:51
7.	"Quiero Bailar" (Music video)	Pesante, Navarro	Iván Joy	3:09
Total length:				66:01

== Charts ==
=== Weekly charts ===
Chart (2005)	Peak Position
US Top Latin Albums (Billboard)	10
US Top Heatseekers (Billboard)	7
US Top Heatseekers (Pacific) (Billboard)	2
US Top Heatseekers (South Atlantic) (Billboard)	2
US Latin Rhythm Albums (Billboard)	3

=== Yearly charts ===
Chart (2006)	Peak Position
US Top Latin Albums (Billboard)	64
US Latin Rhythm Albums (Billboard)	14

=== Singles ===
Year	Song	US chart positions				
Year	Song	Latin Songs	Latin Rhythm Airplay	Latin Tropical Airplay	Latin Pop Songs	Bubbling Under
2005	"Cuéntale"	3	4	1	—	14
2005	"Te He Querido, Te He Llorado"	10	6	4	26	—
2006	"Libertad"	13	9	12	—	—

== Release history ==
List of release dates, showing region, formats and labels
Region	Date	Format	Label
United States	October 4, 2005	CD	Univision
United States	August 26, 2006	Digital download	Machete Music
Germany	September 15, 2007	Import	Univision
Spain	September 15, 2007	CD	Univision

== Sales and certifications ==
Region	Certification	Certified units/sales
United States (RIAA)	Platinum (Latin)	104,000
