= Los 12 Discípulos =

2004 song by Eddie Dee

Single by Eddie Dee featuring Daddy Yankee, Ivy Queen, Tego Calderón, Julio Voltio, Vico C, Zion, Lennox, Nicky Jam, Johnny Prez, Gallego, and Wiso G

from the album 12 Discípulos
- Released: 2004
- Genre: Reggaeton; salsa
- Length: 4:29
- Label: Diamond
- Songwriters: Eddie Ávila; Raymond Ayala; Martha Pesante; Tegui Calderón Rosario; Julio Irving Ramos Filomeno; Luis Armando Lozada Cruz; Felix Ortiz; Gabriel Pizarro
- Producers: The Majestic; Mr. G

Eddie Dee singles chronology
"Cuando Es/Wao" (2004)	"Los 12 Discípulos" (2004)	"Si Tu No Cuidas Tu Mujer" (2004)

Daddy Yankee singles chronology
"Aquí Esta Tu Caldo" (2004)	"Los 12 Discípulos" (2004)	"Gasolina" (2004)

Ivy Queen singles chronology
"Papi Te Quiero" (2004)	"Los 12 Discípulos" (2004)	"Guillaera" (2004)

Tego Calderón singles chronology
"Dominicana" (2003)	"Los 12 Discípulos" (2004)	"Guasa Guasa" (2004)

"Los 12 Discípulos" (English: The 12 Disciples) or "Quítate Tu Pa' Ponerme Yo" (English: Move So I Can Come) is a song by Puerto Rican rapper Eddie Dee featuring various artists from his fifth studio album, 12 Discípulos (2004). It features eleven other reggaeton musicians, who were among the most requested in the genre at the time. These include Eddie Dee along with Daddy Yankee, Ivy Queen, Tego Calderón, Julio Voltio, Vico C, Zion, Lennox, Nicky Jam, Johnny Prez, Gallego, and Wiso G

A salsa version of the song is also available on the special edition of the album released in 2005. The song reached number eight on the Billboard Tropical Songs chart, thus earning a 2005 Billboard Latin Music Award nomination for "Tropical Airplay Track of the Year, New Artist". It was released digitally for the first time on July 31, 2012 as a karaoke version. The track is credited to "Ivy Queen, Tego Calderon & Friends" which is produced by Ameritz Karaoke Latino.

== Background ==
Regarded as "the greatest reggaetón-various artists album of all time", the album 12 Discípulos was released in 2004. It reached number one on the Billboard Tropical Albums chart for three nonconsecutive weeks. It also reached number five on the Billboard Latin Albums chart. The album features songs by some of the most successful reggaetón artist, including the intro of the album "Los 12 Discípulos" where they all come together as one to show that "unity is needed for the genre reggaetón to evolve and survive". In 2005, a special edition of the album was released with a salsa only version of the song entitled "Quítate Tu Pa' Ponerme Yo".

== Composition and writing ==
Eddie Dee "Los 12 Discípulos" (2005)
A 30 second sample of the intro the performance of "Los 12 Discípulos" at the Latin Grammy Awards of 2005.

The main “hook”, or chorus melody, says “Quítate tú pa’ ponerme yo…” throughout the song; this is originally from a salsa song by Johnny Pacheco of Fania All Stars simply called “Quítate Tú”.

The 12 Discípulos song begins with an introduction by Gallego, explaining who the "12 disciples" are, while stating that there were a lot of phone calls made, but only twelve selections. The chorus then follows, performed by a lone Vico C; the first verse is after, performed by Eddie Dee, who is then followed by Tego Calderón. Voltio follows quickly with his own verse. Zion then performs another chorus to the song. Daddy Yankee and then Ivy Queen both follow with their verses respectively. Johnny Prez then performs his verse, which is followed by a chorus performed by Nicky Jam. Wiso G then delivers his respective verse. Lennox performs his verse, while the song is ended by an outdo by Gallego. In order of appearance, artists featured on the song are: Gallego, Vico C, (the main artist) Eddie Dee, Tego Calderón, Voltio, Zion, the king of reggaetón Daddy Yankee, La Reina de Regüetón (The Queen of reggaetón) Ivy Queen, According to the Chilean magazine Publimetro, Queen's verse in the song was a "feminine statement", claiming that women have the power". Johnny Prez, Nicky Jam, Wiso G and finally Lennox. In the video, Vico C sings the final verse, which on the album is performed by Nicky Jam.

== Live performances ==
"Los 12 Discípulos" was performed at the Latin Grammy Awards of 2005. Not all of the singers participated led by Eddie Dee, however, Daddy Yankee was replaced with Eddie Dee, as he performed his worldwide hit "Gasolina" on the show. Eddie Dee also performed Wiso G's verse. Tito El Bambino replaced Nicky Jam on the final chorus. Instead of Queen beginning her verse with "Quítate tu que llego la caballota, la perra, la diva, la potra"; Queen opened with "Quítate tu que llego la caballota, la reina, la diva, la potra"; replacing "perra" which literally means "bitch" with "reina" which means "queen". According to Ayala Ben-Yehuda, when the "12 Disciples" stepped on stage to perform, only one of the genre's leaders was wearing a gold mini-skirt on top of their jeans.

== Charts ==
"Los 12 Discípulos" managed to reach number eight of the Billboard Tropical Songs chart, becoming a top ten hit. It received a nomination for "Tropical Airplay Track of the Year, New Artist" at the 2005 Billboard Latin Music Award.

=== Weekly charts ===
Chart (2004)	Position
US Latin Tropical Airplay (Billboard)	8

=== Year-end charts ===
Chart (2004)	Position
US Latin Tropical Airplay (Billboard)	25
