= 12 Discípulos =

2004 studio album by Eddie Dee

Studio album by Eddie Dee
- Released: January 29, 2004
- Recorded: 2003 in Rio Piedras, Puerto Rico
- Genres: Reggaeton; hip hop
- Length: 53:08
- Label: Diamond Music
- Producers: DJ Adam, DJ David, DJ Urba & Monserrate, Ecko, Eddie Dee, Gran Omar, Iván Joy, Ivy Queen, Luny Tunes, Mr. G, The Majestic, Daddy Yankee, Noriega, Rafi Mercenario, Santana, Vico C, Coo-Kee

Eddie Dee chronology
Biografía (2001)	12 Discípulos (2004)	The Final Countdown (2007)

Singles from 12 Discipulos
- 1. "Intro – 12 Discípulos" Released: April 24, 2004; 2. "Punto y Aparte" Released: May 19, 2004; 3. "Si No Cuidas Tu Mujer" Released: September 26, 2004; 4. "Taladro" Released: December 27, 2005

12 Discípulos (English: 12 Disciples) is the debut compilation album, and fifth overall, by Puerto Rican reggaeton rapper Eddie Dee. It was released on January 29, 2004, and independently distributed by Diamond Music. 12 Discípulos features eleven other reggaeton musicians, who were among the most requested in the genre at the time. These include Daddy Yankee, along with Ivy Queen, Tego Calderón, Julio Voltio, Vico C, Zion & Lennox, Nicky Jam, Johnny Prez, Gallego, and Wiso G.

The album features production collaborations with several Puerto Rican music producers including DJ Adam, DJ David, DJ Urba & Monserrate, Ecko, Gran Omar, Luny Tunes, Mr. G, The Majestic, Noriega, Rafi Mercenario and Santana. Recording and production occurred in Dee's home studio in Rio Piedras, Puerto Rico, during much of late 2003.

The album spawned four singles, the lead which included all twelve of the featured performers. It was followed by "Punto y Aparte", "Si No Cuidas Tu Mujer" and "Taladro". On the Billboard Latin Albums chart, the album peaked at number five, on the Billboard Tropical Albums chart, it peaked at number one for three inconsecutive weeks. It also managed to reach number eighteen on the Billboard Independent Albums chart. The album's commercial success promoted Machete Music to pick up the album for a special edition rerelease on December 13, 2005.

== Background ==
Prior to releasing 12 Discípulos, Eddie Dee had previously released four studio albums, Eddie Dee and the Ghetto Crew (1993), Tagwut (1997), El Terrorista De La Lírica (2000) and 2001's Biografía. Dee began making television appearances dancing and performing in 1993. Three years later, Dee released his debut studio album Eddie Dee and the Ghetto Crew. Following the album, he began gaining popularity within Puerto Rico by collaborating with other artists. 1997's Tagwut featured the hit single, "Senor Oficial". The song detailed "the injustices that young Puerto Rican men suffered at the hands of the police." It was a commercial success, reaching number one in Puerto Rico. The record won him the Puerto Rican Rap and Reggae Award for Best Lyrics of 1997. His two subsequent studio albums also enjoyed underground success. Dee then began recording material for his fifth studio album.

== Recording and production ==
Eddie Dee himself installed a recording studio inside his own home in Rio Piedras, Puerto Rico, where the album was recorded and produced. Production of the album was handled by a variety of Puerto Rican musical producers. It included production from DJ Adam, DJ David, DJ Urba & Monserrate, Ecko, Gran Omar, Luny Tunes, Mr. G, The Majestic, Noriega, Rafi Mercenario and Santana.

Executive production for the track "Que Es La Que Hay" was handled by Ivy Queen and overall executive production was handled by Eddie Dee and Iván Joy for Diamond Music. The vocals of Glory and Valerie Morales were used in the recording and production of some of the songs off the album. Esteban Piñero served as the album's mastering engineer. The album's creative design was handled by Holly Chen and photography was taken by Gary Bonderenko.

== Release and promotion ==
12 Discípulos was independently released physically on January 29, 2004, by Diamond Music in the United States and Puerto Rico. It was released two days after the release of Ivy Queen's Diva Platinum Edition. Due to the album's commercial success, the album was picked by Machete Music and re-released on December 13, 2005. It was released digitally on July 25, 2009.

The album's lead single was performed live at the Latin Grammy Awards of 2005. The performance began with a video presentation of Héctor Lavoe's 1972 hit "Quitate Tu Pa' Ponerme Yo". It was then followed by Gallego introducing the song with "Those were the masters, we are the twelve disciples". Amid screams, Vico C followed delivering his verse. Eddie Dee followed who was succeeded by an unexpected Tego Calderón. One by one, Voltio and Zion sang the chorus. Ivy Queen then delivered her verse, which according to Univision, made her the queen of the night. She was followed by Johnny Prez, Tito "El Bambino" and Lennox. The performance ended with a standing ovation from the public. During the performance, each performer wore a shirt with a picture of the salsa singer in which they most identified with.

== Songs and repertoire ==
Daddy Yankee "Donde Hubo Fuego" (2004)
An 18-second sample of Daddy Yankee's "Donde Hubo Fuego", which musically combines R&B and reggaeton.

The album opens with "Intro – 12 Discípulos" ("Intro – 12 Disciples"), in which all twelve featured artists collaborated. They were united "as one on a reggaetón track and showed that unity is needed for this genre to evolve and survive". The song's musical aesthetics lean heavily toward salsa. "Cuando Es" ("When Is It?"), performed by Eddie Dee, features sensual vocals by Glory. Dee opened the door for Glory, as she later was featured on "collaborations with the genre's most important and influential recording artists." "Donde Hubo Fuego" ("Where There Was Fire") is performed by Daddy Yankee. The song also features vocals by Glory, along with vocals by Valerie Morales. Following Morales' success with her debut single "Te Exitare", she was contacted by Dee who told her he wanted her to sing on a song from him. This was turned into "Donde Hubo Fuego". Raymond Acosta also contributes his vocals to the chorus of "Donde Hubo Fuego". The song is followed by Tego Calderón's "Punto y Aparte" ("Final and Apart"). Lyrically, Calderón explains that his style is from the street, but at the same time elegant. The song speaks of violence in Puerto Rican projects. The song has been covered by several artists including Abaya on his 2005 album Pura Cosa Buena, Boricua Boys on their third studio album Urban vs Reggaetón (2005), and Los Reggaetronics on their debut studio album 50 Best of Reggaetón (2009).

"Se Te Apagó El Bling Bling" ("Your Bling-Bling Got Turned Off") is performed by Vico C. On the special edition release of the album, the track appears remixed by DJ Adam. Zion & Lennox's "Tienes Que Hacerlo" (You Have To Do It) is featured as track six and appears remixed by Santana on the special edition release of the album. "Tu y Yo" ("You and I"), performed by Nicky Jam, follows with a running time of two minutes and forty-two seconds. Eddie Dee's "Si No Cuidas Tu Mujer" ("If You Don't Take Care of Your Woman") serves as the album's third single. The song's lyrics advise to take care of your woman, or another man will. Eddie Dee sings "The one who conquers the one you love, he'll keep your chair, your plate, your bathroom, your home, your woman, and you bed. It'll be too late when you realize, that what she told you was true. And that someone will be the one to see how your children grow up". Raymond Acosta also contributed his vocals to "Si No Cuidas Tu Mujer".

Voltio follows with "Atrevida Bandolera" ("Bold Outlaw"). The song also appears on the special edition release remixed by Santana. The lone female performer on the album delivers "Que Es La Que Hay" (What's It Gonna Be?), produced by Noriega and Rafi Mercenario. Lyrically, Ivy Queen reassures that she can handle her own in any situation that may arise. In the lyrics, she tells someone to "Go tell your friend not to fuck with the bitch, she is mistaken, and is looking for a war, tell her we'll give it to her real hard, I walk with my combo, and are they are crazy to be loosed". Ivy Queen explained to the Dominican Times, that the song is proof of her inner strength as a person. She continued by saying that "this philosophy is the present reality that we live in the world and especially in Puerto Rico". The song was later featured on Machete Music's Reggaetón Diamond Collection (2005), which peaked at number fifty-seven on the Billboard Latin Albums chart and number twelve on the Billboard Latin Rhythm Albums chart.

Johnny Prez is featured next with "Nebuleando Conmigo" ("Conspiring With Me"). Veteran reggaetón recording artist Wiso G appears with "Medley 2004". Eddie Dee closes the album with "Sácame El Guante" ("Get The Glove Off Me"), in which Lennox contributes his vocals. "Censuarme" performed by Eddie Dee speaks of violence and poverty as it relates to Dee's personal experiences. Lyrically, he also claims that society criticizes him for being a rapper. He later criticizes the Puerto Rican senate's attempts to ban reggaeton music. Among other subjects, the song also addresses government corruption and media censorship. The song also identifies and explores racial differences as well as the criminalization of the African American community. "Taladro", ("The Drill"), performed by Eddie Dee in collaboration with Daddy Yankee opens the special edition release of the 12 Discípulos. It was released as the fourth and final single off the album. La Secta's "La Locura Automatica" appears second featuring Eddie Dee. A salsa remix of the lead single appears as a bonus track on the special edition release, renamed "Quitate Tu Pa' Ponerme Yo" ("Get Out The Way, So I Can Take Your Place").

== Reception ==
=== Commercial ===
In its first three weeks of release, the album sold over 70,000 copies in Puerto Rico alone. On the week of 7 February 2004, the album debuted at number five on the Billboard Latin Albums chart, becoming the charts "Hot Shot Debut". On the Billboard Tropical Albums chart, it debuted at number one for the week of 7 February 2004. Ironically, two weeks later, the album was displaced by Ivy Queen's Diva Platinum Edition. The two releases exchanged positions over the subsequent weeks. It also managed to debut and peak at number eighteen on the Billboard Independent Albums chart. The album's lead single received a nomination for "Tropical Airplay Track of the Year, New Artist" at the 2005 Billboard Latin Music Award. On the Billboard Tropical Songs chart, the song debuted at number twenty-eight for the week of 1 May 2004. It peaked at number eight for the week of 15 May 2005. "Punto y Aparte" debuted at number thirty-four on the Billboard Tropical Songs chart at number thirty-four for the week of 23 October 2005. It peaked at number thirteen for the week of 26 February 2005. The final single, "Taladro", debuted at number thirty-six on the Billboard Tropical Songs chart, for the week of 25 March 2006. It peaked at number twenty-two for the week of 8 April 2006. The song also debuted at number thirty-nine on the Billboard Latin Rhythm Songs chart, for the week of 14 January 2006. It peaked at number twenty-nine for the week of 25 April 2006.

=== Critical ===
Professional ratings
Review scores
Source	Rating
Dominican Times	4.5/5 stars

The album received mainly positive reviews from critics and has been proclaimed as "the greatest reggaeton various artists album of all times." According to Allmusic's Evan Guttierrez, 12 Discípulos was Dee's most notable achievement, outweighing the "immense underground successes" of his four previous studio efforts. The magazine Dominican Times gave the album a positive review and selected the intro, Tego Calderón's "Punto y Aparte", Gallego's "12 Meses", and Ivy Queen's "Que Es La Que Hay" as album highlights. An editor for the magazine stated that "by just listening to the album, you realize that this album is going to be historic in the genre of reggaeton." He cited the quality of the songs and collaboration of the artists as being the album's strongpoints. He ended by stating that the album "is the CD to get the party going" and awarded the album four and a half stars out of five. An editor for Bulb Magazine selected the album as one of reggaetón's most classic albums in 2007.

== Track listing ==
No.	Title	Lyrics	Music	Performer	Length
1.	"Intro – 12 Discípulos"	Eddie Ávila, Raymond Ayala, Martha Pesante, Tegui Calderón, Julio Ramos, Luis Cruz, Felix Ortiz, Gabriel Pizarro, Nick Rivera, Ismael Torres, Luis Ortiz	Mr. G, The Majestic	Eddie Dee, Daddy Yankee, Ivy Queen, Tego Calderon, Julio Voltio, Vico C, Zion & Lennox, Nicky Jam, Johnny Prez, Gallego, Wiso G	4:29
2.	"Cuando Es"	Ávila	DJ Adam	Eddie Dee	3:20
3.	"Donde Hubo Fuego"	Ávila, Ayala, Victor Cabrera, Francisco Saldana	Luny Tunes	Daddy Yankee, Valerie Morales, Glory (singer)	3:25
4.	"Punto y Aparte"	Rosario, Saldana, Eliel Lind	Luny Tunes	Tego Calderón	3:24
5.	"Se Te Apagó El Bling, Bling"	Ávila, Cruz	Ecko, Vico C	Vico C	4:01
6.	"Tienes Que Hacerlo"	Ortiz, Pizarro	Mr. G, The Majestic	Zion & Lennox	2:49
7.	"Tu y Yo"	Ávila, Rivera, Alberto Aguilera	Luny Tunes	Nicky Jam	2:42
8.	"Si No Cuidas Tu Mujer"	Ávila, Cabrera, Saldana	Luny Tunes	Eddie Dee	3:59
9.	"Atrevida Bandolera"	Ávila, Ramos	Mr. G, The Majestic	Voltio	3:12
10.	"Que Es La Que Hay"	Ávila, Pesante	Noriega, Rafi Mercenario	Ivy Queen	2:51
11.	"Nebuleando Conmigo"	Ávila, Jonathan Rodriguez	Mr. G, The Majestic	Johnny Prez	3:46
12.	"Medley 2004"	Ávila, Luis Torres Ortiz	DJ David	Wiso G	3:11
13.	"12 Meses"	Ismael Torres	DJ Urba & Monserrate	Gallego	4:19
14.	"Sácame El Guante"	Ávila	Coo-Kee	Eddie Dee	4:10
15.	"Censuarme" (Bonus Track)	Ávila	DJ Urba & Monserrate	Eddie Dee	3:32
Total length:					53:09

Special Edition CD
No.	Title	Lyrics	Music	Performers	Length
1.	"Taladro" (featuring Daddy Yankee)	Eddie Ávila, Raymond Ayala	DJ Urba & Monserrate	Eddie Dee	3:25
2.	"La Locura Automatica" (featuring Eddie Dee)	Ávila, Gustavo Laureano	Santana	La Secta	4:05
3.	"Quítate Tu Pa' Ponerme Yo" (Album Version)	Ávila, Ayala, Martha Pesante, Tegui Calderón, Julio Voltio, Luis Cruz, Felix Ortiz, Gabriel Pizarro, Nick Rivera, Ismael Torres, Luis Ortiz	Mr. G, The Majestic	Eddie Dee, Daddy Yankee, Ivy Queen, Tego Calderon, Julio Voltio, Vico C, Zion & Lennox, Nicky Jam, Johnny Prez, Gallego, Wiso G	4:29
4.	"Cuando Es"	Ávila	DJ Adam	Eddie Dee	3:20
5.	"Donde Hubo Fuego"	Ávila, Ayala, Victor Cabrera, Francisco Saldana	Luny Tunes	Daddy Yankee	3:25
6.	"Punto y Aparte"	Rosario, Saldana, Eliel Lind	Luny Tunes	Tego Calderón	3:24
7.	"Se Te Apagó El Bling, Bling" (Remix)	Ávila, Cruz	DJ Adam	Vico C	3:57
8.	"Tienes Que Hacerlo" (Remix)	Ortiz, Pizarro	Santana	Zion & Lennox	2:55
9.	"Tu y Yo"	Ávila, Rivera, Alberto Aguilera	Luny Tunes	Nicky Jam	2:42
10.	"Si No Cuidas Tu Mujer"	Ávila, Cabrera, Saldana	Luny Tunes	Eddie Dee	3:58
11.	"Atrevida Bandolera" (Remix)	Ávila, Ramos	Santana	Voltio	3:10
12.	"Que Es La Que Hay"	Ávila, Pesante	Noriega, Rafi Mercenario	Ivy Queen	2:51
13.	"Nebuleando Conmigo"	Ávila, Jonathan Rodriguez	Mr. G, The Majestic	Johnny Prez	3:46
14.	"Medley 2006"	Ávila, Luis Torres Ortiz	DJ David	Wiso G	3:11
15.	"12 Meses"	Ismael Torres	DJ Urba & Monserrate	Gallego	4:19
16.	"Sácame El Guante"	Ávila	Coo-Kee	Eddie Dee	4:10
17.	"Censuarme" (Bonus Track)	Ávila	DJ Urba & Monserrate	Eddie Dee	3:32
18.	"Quítate Tu Pa' Ponerme Yo" (Salsa Version)	Eddie Ávila, Raymond Ayala, Martha Pesante, Tegui Calderón Rosario, Julio Irving Ramos Filomeno, Luis Armando Lozada Cruz, Felix Ortiz, Gabriel Pizarro, Nick Rivera, Ismael Torres, Luis Ortiz	Mr. G, The Majestic	Eddie Dee, Daddy Yankee, Ivy Queen, Tego Calderon, Voltio, Vico C, Zion & Lennox, Nicky Jam, Johnny Prez, Gallego, Wiso G, Ismael Miranda	4:51
Total length:					1:05:30

Special Edition DVD
No.	Title	Lyrics	Music	Performers	Length
1.	"Quítate Tu Pa' Ponerme Yo" (Music Video)	Eddie Ávila, Raymond Ayala, Martha Pesante, Tegui Calderón, Julio Voltio, Luis Cruz, Felix Ortiz, Gabriel Pizarro, Nick Rivera, Ismael Torres, Luis Ortiz	Mr. G, The Majestic	Eddie Dee, Daddy Yankee, Ivy Queen, Tego Calderon, Julio Voltio, Vico C, Zion & Lennox, Nicky Jam, Johnny Prez, Gallego, Wiso G	4:46
2.	"Censurarme" (Music Video)	Ávila	DJ Urba & Monserrate	Eddie Dee	4:12
3.	"Sácame El Guante" (Music Video)	Ávila	Cookee	Eddie Dee	4:26
4.	"Si No Cuidas Tu Mujer" (Music Video)	Ávila, Cabrera, Saldana	Luny Tunes	Eddie Dee	4:12
5.	"Quítate Tu Pa' Ponerme Yo" (Salsa Version Music Video)	Eddie Ávila, Raymond Ayala, Martha Pesante, Tegui Calderón Rosario, Julio Irving Ramos Filomeno, Luis Armando Lozada Cruz, Felix Ortiz, Gabriel Pizarro, Nick Rivera, Ismael Torres, Luis Ortiz	Mr. G, The Majestic	Eddie Dee, Daddy Yankee, Ivy Queen, Tego Calderon, Voltio, Vico C, Zion & Lennox, Nicky Jam, Johnny Prez, Gallego, Wiso G	5:37
6.	"El Diario De Eddie Ávila" (Preview)

== Charts ==
Chart (2004)	Peak Position
US Independent Albums (Billboard)	18
US Latin Albums (Billboard)	5
US Tropical Albums (Billboard)	1

== Release history ==
=== Standard edition ===
Region	Date	Format	Label
Canada	June 22, 2004	CD	Musicrama
France	January 29, 2004	Import	South Central Musica
Germany	January 29, 2004	Import	South Central Musica
Italy	January 29, 2004	Import	South Central Musica
India	January 29, 2004	Import	South Central Musica
Japan	January 29, 2004	Import	South Central Musica
Spain	January 29, 2004	Import	South Central Musica
United Kingdom	January 29, 2004	Import	South Central Musica
United States	January 29, 2004	CD	Diamond Music

=== Special edition ===
Region	Date	Format	Label
Canada	20 December 2005	Import	Machete Music
France	20 December 2005	Import	Machete Music
Germany	14 September 2007	Import	Machete Music
Italy	20 December 2005	Import	Machete Music
India	20 December 2005	Import	Machete Music
Japan	20 December 2005	Import	Machete Music
Spain	20 December 2005	Import	Machete Music
United Kingdom	20 December 2005	Import	Machete Music
United States	20 December 2005	CD	Machete Music

== Credits and personnel ==
Adapted from the album's liner notes.

- Raymond Acosta – Vocals ("Donde Hubo Fuego", "Si No Cuidas Tu Mujer")
- Gary Bonderenko – Photography
- Tego Calderón – Primary Artist
- Holly Chen – Illustrations
- Daddy Yankee – Primary Artist
- Eddie Dee – Executive Production, Primary Artist, Vocals ("Intro – 12 Discipulos", "Cuando Es", "Si No Cuidas Tu Mujer", "Sacame El Guante", "Censuarme", "Taladro", "La Locura Automatica")
- Diamond Music – Record Label
- DJ Adam – Producer
- DJ David – Producer
- DJ Urba – Producer
- Ecko – Producer
- Gallego – Primary Artist
- Glory – Vocals ("Cuando Es", "Donde Hubo Fuego")
- Gran Omar – Executive Production ("Que Es La Que Hay")
- Ivan Joy – Executive Production
- Ivy Queen – Executive Production ("Que Es La Que Hay"), Primary Artist
- Nicky Jam – Primary Artist
- Luny Tunes – Producer
- Rafi Mercenario – Producer
- Machete Music – Distribution
- Mr. G – Producer
- Noriega – Producer
- Esteban Piñero – Mastering
- Johnny Prez – Primary Artist
- Valerie Morales – Vocals ("Donde Hubo Fuego")
- Vico C – Primary Artist
- Voltio – Primary Artist
- Wiso G – Primary Artist
- Zion & Lennox – Primary Artists

== See also ==
- List of number-one Billboard Tropical Albums from the 2000s
