= Eddie Dee =

Puerto Rican rapper (born 1977)

- Also known as: E.D.D.I.E. (or E.D.D.); El Más Que Escribe
- Born: Eddie Alexander Ávila Ortiz; April 26, 1977 (age 49); Río Piedras, Puerto Rico
- Genres: Hip hop; reggaeton; reggae
- Occupations: Rapper; singer; lyricist; dancer
- Instruments: Vocals; electronic keyboards
- Years active: 1990–2013
- Labels: Fresh Productions; Diamond Music; Machete Music

Eddie Alexander Ávila Ortiz (born April 26, 1977), originally known by his stage name Eddie Dee, is a Puerto Rican rapper. He began his career in 1990 and launched his debut studio album three years later. His second album became popular in Puerto Rico and was titled Tagwut in 1997. It featured the hit single "Señor Official". His following releases El Terrorista de la Lírica (2000) and Biografía (2001), likewise enjoyed underground success. The 2004 album 12 Discípulos is regarded as "the greatest reggaetón various artist album of all time". The album features songs by some of the most successful reggaetón artist, including the intro of the album, where they all come together as one to show that "unity is needed for the genre reggaetón to survive and evolve". It was a collaboration between eleven other artist including Daddy Yankee, Tego Calderon, Ivy Queen, and Vico C among others, who were among the most requested at the time. The track, known as "Los 12 Discípulos" or "Quítate Tu Pa' Ponerme Yo" reached number eight on the Billboard Tropical Songs chart, and was nominated for a 2005 Billboard Latin Music Award for "Tropical Airplay Track of the Year, New Artist". The album itself reached number one on the Billboard Tropical Albums chart for three nonconsecutive weeks.

== Musical career ==
=== 1990-2004: Beginning and rise to fame ===
Eddie Dee was born Eddie Alexander Ávila Ortiz on April 26, 1977 to his mother Diomaris Ortiz and father Eddie Ávila. He began singing and composing songs at an early age before beginning his musical career in 1990, when he started to appear on television shows. His first encounter with fame was in 1987 when he was already famous in his neighbourhood because of his rapping. In 1991 he was one of the dancers in the Puerto Rican propaganda El Sida Está Cañón, led by the singer Ernesto Morales, a message to prevent AIDS. In 1993, he released his debut album Eddie & The Ghetto Crew. Following the album, he began gaining popularity within Puerto Rico by collaborating with other artists. In 1994 Eddie participated on a music video for Straight From The Ghetto, a mixtape by the producer DJ Guichy, being Edde's first participation on a music video. Eddie Dee became popular with the 1997 single "Señor Oficial," from the album "DJ Adam Mad Jam Da' Comeback", which detailed "the injustices that young Puerto Rican men suffered at the hands of the police." It was a commercial success reaching number one in Puerto Rico. The album gained him a "Puerto Rican Rap and Reggae Award for Best Lyrics" the same year. In 1999 he recorded the song "En Peligro De Extinción" featuring then-unknown rapper Tego Calderón for his next studio album: El Terrorista De La Lírica (which also includes the posthumous appearance of Frankie Ruiz, a famous American salsa singer, who died in 1998). In 2003, Eddie Dee gained international popularity after his first studio album, El Abayarde, which sold 300.000 copies worldwide.

=== 2004-06: 12 Discípulos international success ===
Eddie Dee "Los 12 Discípulos" (2005)
A 30 second sample of the intro to the performance of "Los 12 Discípulos" at the Latin Grammy Awards of 2005.

He experienced underground success with his following two releases El Terrorista de la Lírica (2000) and Biografía (2001). In 2004, Dee launched 12 Discípulos which reached number one on the Billboard Tropical Albums chart for three nonconsecutive weeks. It also reached number five on the Billboard Latin Albums chart. "Cuando Es/Wao" was released as the lead single. The title track, "Los 12 Discípulos" was released as the second single and reached number eight on the Billboard Tropical Songs chart. It was nominated for a 2005 Billboard Latin Music Award for "Tropical Airplay Track of the Year, New Artist". It featured Daddy Yankee, Ivy Queen, Tego Calderón, Julio Voltio, Vico C, Zion, Lennox, Nicky Jam, Johnny Prez, Gallego, and Wiso G. Also in 2004, Dee co-wrote Daddy Yankee's super-hit "Gasolina" from his 2004 album Barrio Fino which became a commercial success in the United States and introduced reggaeton to American, European, Asian, and African audiences, alongside Ivy Queen's Diva and Real and Tego Calderon's El Enemy de los Guasibiri. A year later was released a special edition for 12 Discípulos, which included a remix version of La Secta's "La Locura Automática" and the single "El Taladro" featuring Daddy Yankee, song that reached the #22 position in Billboard's Latin Tropical Airplay charts. According to the American Society of Composers, Authors and Publishers, he is "your rapper's favorite rapper".

=== 2006-present: El Diario and musical inactivity ===
In 2005, he announced his next studio album: El Diario, which was going to be released in November 2007. In that year was released a 10 track-long free mixtape titled The Final Countdown, but El Diario wasn't released. In 2009 was announced another mixtape: 180 Grados and Eddie said that his studio album was going to be released, and also said that it wasn't published in 2007 because he wasn't sure of his album quality as to music. Neither El Diario and 180 Grados have been released, but both also haven’t been confirmed to be canceled. His work has been decreased after El Diario's postponement, releasing just two singles between 2009 and 2010, writing Jowell & Randy's "Un Cambio" in 2010 and Plan B's "Te Dijeron" for Pina Record's La Formula in 2012, and collaborating in Alexis & Fido's "La Trampa" (2011) and Wisin's remix of "Sistema" (2013), which was his last participation in a song, either being him as principal or guest artist.

After two years of public inactivity, Eddie Dee appeared as a guest artist in Tego Calderon's La Trayectoria concert in 2015 at the famous Puerto Rican Coliseum, performing "Los 12 Discípulos", "En Peligro De Extinción", and "El Bueno, El Malo Y El Feo" alongside Calderón and Vico C. This was the last known public appearance of Eddie Avila formerly known as Eddie Dee who as of 2024 remains inactive in the music industry.

== Discography ==
Studio albums

- 1993: Eddie Dee & The Ghetto Crew
- 2000: El Terrorista De La Lírica
- TBA: El Diario

Mixtapes

- 2007: The Final Countdown
- TBA: 180 Grados

Compilation albums

- 2004: 12 Discípulos

Greatest hits albums

- 2001: Biografía
- 2009: Oro Reggaetonero: 20 Éxitos

== Awards and nominations ==
Year	Nominee / work	Award	Result
1997	"Señor Oficial"	Puerto Rican Rap and Reggae Award for Best Lyrics	Won
1998	"Amor Mío"	Puerto Rican Rap and Reggae Award for Best Song	Won
1998	"Amor Mío"	Puerto Rican Rap and Reggae Award for Best Lyrics	Won
2005	"Los 12 Discípulos"; Joint nomination with Gallego, Vico C, Tego Calderón, Ivy Queen, Julio Voltio, Daddy Yankee, Zion & Lennox, Johnny Prez, Nicky Jam and Wiso G	Billboard Latin Music Award for Tropical Airplay Track of the Year, New Artist	Nominated
2005	"Gasolina"; Joint nomination with Daddy Yankee and Luny Tunes	Latin Grammy Award for Record of the Year (as songwriter)	Nominated
