= Iván Joy =

Puerto Rican music producer

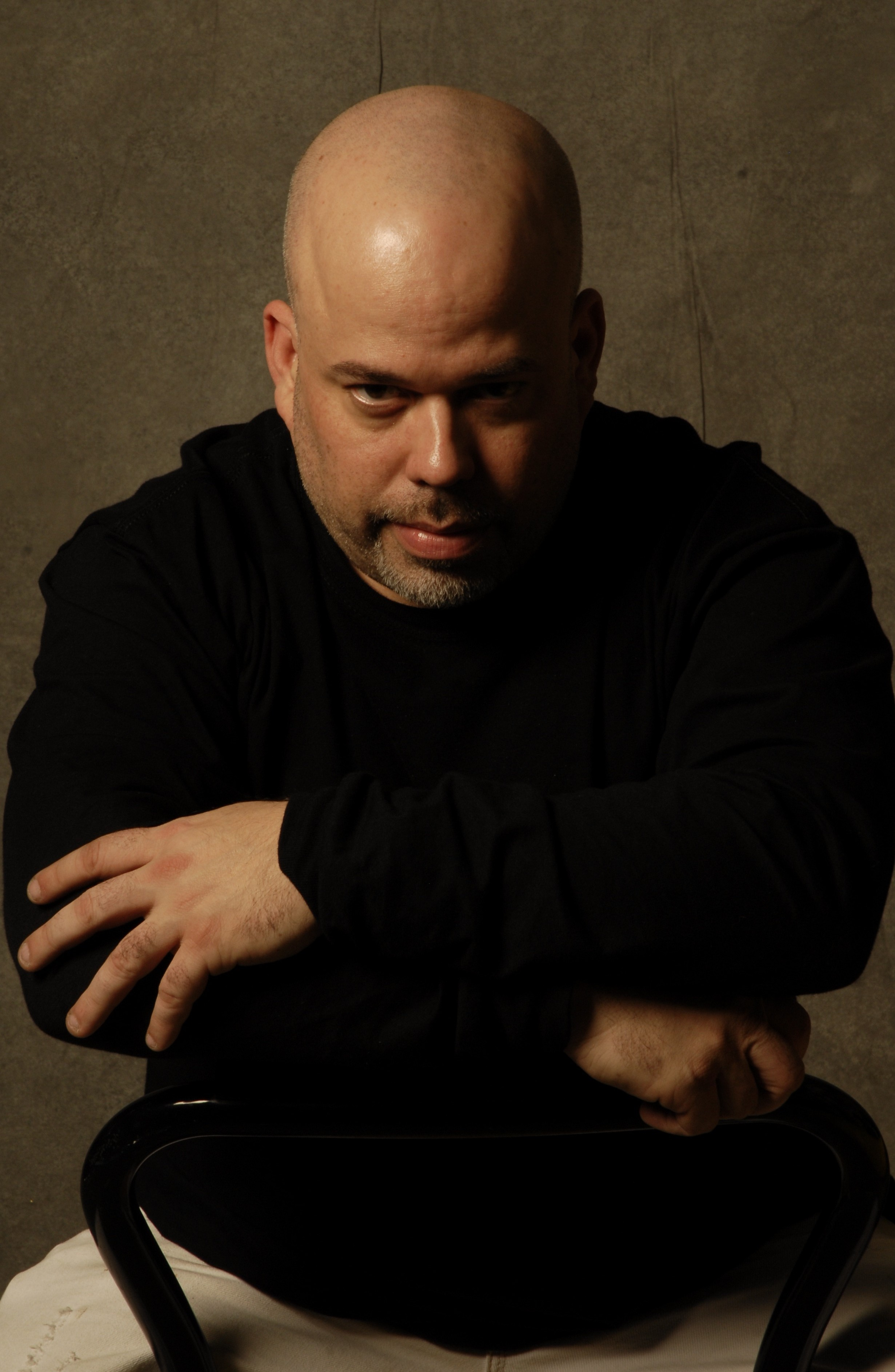

Background information
- Born: Iván Manuel García de la Noceda Joy; December 3, 1975 (age 50)
- Origin: San Juan, Puerto Rico
- Genres: Latin Music
- Occupation: musical producer
- Years active: 2000–present
- Label: Artist System / Diamond Music

Iván Manuel García de la Noceda Joy (born December 3, 1975, in San Juan, Puerto Rico), known artistically as Ivan Joy, is the musical producer in the Latin American urban genre. In 2000 he established his label "Diamond Music", which is already 16 years in the process of distribution and creation of music products.

The most famous productions of Diamond Music are "Kilates" (by Various artists), "The Majestic" (by Various artists), "Sonando Diferente" (by Yaga & Mackie) etc., which made this label very famous on the Latin music market.

== Biography ==
The label Diamond Music was established in 2000 and rapidly occupied important positions on the Latin music market. Here began their careers the top reggaeton artists Zion & Lennox, Tego Calderon, Jowell & Randy, Yaga & Mackie, Johnny Prez and strengthened their careers Ivy Queen, Eddie Dee and many more.

The album "Sonando Diferente" (2002), the first album by the reggaeton duet Yaga & Mackie, became a jewel of reggaeton and had been sold in over 70,000 copies worldwide. The album peaked number 10 of Latin Pop Chart and number 22 of Latin Albums Chart. It had such invited artists as Tego Calderon, Julio Voltio, Daddy Yankee, Johnny Prez, Pedro Prez, Maicol & Manuel, Baby Rasta & Gringo, Cheka. This production made Yaga & Mackie international artists.

In 2003 released the first music products "Kilates" and "The Majestic", the albums which have been appreciated as the most important on the Latin music market over time. "The Majestic" was one of the most successful albums, where the reggaeton artists Nicky Jam, Ivy Queen, Tego Calderon, Eddie Dee, Zion & Lennox, Maicol & Manuel made their appearance.

In 2003 released the other production of Diamond Music "El Dragón" by Johnny Prez, the album, which became popular even in Asia and made him a very important artist at the international level thanks to the work of creation, production and distribution of the label Diamond Music.

In 2004 came the album "The Majestic 2", where appeared the famous reggaeton artists like Ivy Queen with her song "Yo Quiero Saber", Johnny Prez with the song "Te Gusta Seducir", Tego Calderon with his video "Naqui Naqui" etc. The other success of Tego was the song "Mira Quién Llega" from the album "Planet Reggae".

The rapper TNB was also successful as a music producer in Diamond Music.

In 2004 appeared the second album of Yaga & Mackie "Clase Aparte", where make their collaboration the artists Zion & Lennox, Don Omar etc. The most famous song from this album is "La Batidora" in collaboration with Don Omar.

In the same year Diamond Music continued its success with the album "12 Discípulos" which was the result of creative and executive production by Ivan Joy and Eddie Dee. The album, with collaborations by such artists as Eddie Dee, Daddy Yankee, Zion & Lennox, Ivy Queen, Tego Calderon, Julio Voltio, Vico C, Johnny Prez and many others, has been nominated for Latin Grammy and was the world's maximum exposure to the liking of the public.

Diamond Music is the leader in distribution, promotion and digital logistics with extensive experience and is still the leading company in Puerto Rico and throughout Latin America with more than 250 productions. The company is dedicated to promotional campaigns, Latin e-marketing and direct specific. On the Latin market there are productions of Lucecita Benítez "La Voz Nacional" (17 volumes), Arcángel, Orquesta Corporación America, Conjunto Canayón, Sophy, Jadiel, Rey Pirin, Brian Michael, Arquimedes, Yaga & Mackie, Lourdes Robles, Manolo Lezcano, Lunna, Lou Briel and many more. The label is also the creative production house and more than 35 videos in the urban genre.

In 2010 the professional pianist and composer Isidro Infante and Ivan Joy established the new company Artist System Corp., which is in collaboration with Diamond Music. The new company won important positions in the market of digital production and promotion and is also very experienced in creating and managing of digital content. The company is working with such artists like Isidro Infante, Lucecita Benitez "La Voz Nacional de Puerto Rico", Lunna, Lou Briel, Lourdes Robles, Сonjunto Canayón, Сorporación America, Manolo Lezcano, Jowell & Randy, Arcángel, Tego Calderon, Jadiel, Endo, Guelo Star, Kastrofobia, Los Metalicoz and many more.

The president of Artist System Inc. is Isidro Infante, Vice President - Ivan Joy. Diamond Music is the part of Artist System Corp.

== Studio albums ==
- 2002 – Sonando Diferente, Yaga & Mackie
- 2003 – El Dragón, Johnny Prez
- 2003 – Kilates Rompiendo El Silencio, Various Artists
- 2003 – Kilates 2ndo Impacto: El Silencio Que Duele, Various Artists
- 2003 – The Majestic, Various Artists
- 2004 – Majestic Segundo II Imperio, Various Artists
- 2004 – 12 Discipulos, Various Artists
- 2004 – Clase Aparte, Yaga & Mackie
- 2005 – Reggaeton Diamond Collection, Various Artists
- 2006 – 40 Reggaeton Jewels, Various Artists
- 2007 – Kilates 1 Digital Remixes by DJ Wheel Master, Various Artists
- 2007 – Kilates 2 Digital Remixes By DJ Martino, Various Artists
- 2007 – Majestic Digital Remix by DJ Martino, Various Artists
- 2007 – Nonstop 1 Slow Jam, Various Artists
- 2007 – Nonstop 3 Parixeo Mix, Various Artists
- 2007 – Old School / New School, Various Artists
- 2007 – Reggaeton Diamond Hits, Various Artists
- 2009 – De Regreso, Orquesta Corporación Latina
- 2009 – Latino Mix Vol. 1, Various Artists
