= Sin Control =

Compilation album by Noriega
- Released: May 9, 2006
- Genre: Reggaeton
- Length: 42.57
- Language: Spanish and English
- Label: Universal Music; Univision Music
- Producer: Noriega (Exec.); DJ Rafi Mercenario; Tainy

Noriega chronology
Contra la Corriente (2004)	Sin Control (2006)

Sin Control is the follow-up album of Contra la Corriente by Noriega released in 2006, by La Calle Records. Tito el Bambino, Ivy Queen, John Eric, among other artists, participate in the album. The album peaked at #13 in its first week on Billboard's Latin Rhythm chart.

== Track listing ==
1. "Intro"
2. "Frente a Él" (by Tito "El Bambino")
3. "Despreocúpate" (by Julio Voltio, Cheka, & Noriega)
4. "Hay de Mí" (by Baby Rasta)
5. "Las Noches Son Tristes" (by Divino, Angel & Khriz, Dandyel, Gocho, Montana & Mora)
6. "A Oscuras" (by Las Guanábanas)
7. "Tanto Dolor" (by Lennox)
8. "Atangana" (by John Eric)
9. "A Ver Quien Da Más" (by K-Mill)
10. "Tú Eres Lo Que Yo Quiero" (by Omy & Cidely)
11. "Much Pa' Ti" (by Don Chezina)
12. "Baílalo Sin Miedo" (by Sabios & Tingy)
13. "A Mí No Me Enganas" (by La Sista)
14. "VIP At The Party" (by Fragment Crew)
15. "Hay de Mí (Blind for You)" [Bonus Track] (by Baby Rasta)
16. "Tu Reina Soy Yo" (by Ivy Queen) [Hidden Track]

== Chart performance ==
Chart (2006)	Peak position
U.S. Billboard Latin Rhythm Albums	13
