= El Dragón =

El Dragón is Spanish for "dragon". It may refer to:

- El Dragón, a 2003 album by Johnny Prez
- El Dragón, a 2023 album by Lola Índigo
- El Dragón: Return of a Warrior, a Spanish-language crime drama television series
- Francis Drake, who earned the nickname for his privateering efforts in the Spanish Main during the 16th century
