= 2005 Premios Juventud =

2nd Premios Juventud
- Date: September 22, 2005
- Location: Watsco Center in Miami, Florida
- Hosted by: Jaime Camil and Kate del Castillo
- Website: Official Page

Television/radio coverage
- Network: Univision

The 2nd Annual Premios Juventud (Youth Awards) were broadcast by Univision on September 22, 2005.

This was the last edition to be held in September until the 22nd edition that was held on September 25, 2025.

== Arrivals and presenters ==
- Anaís
- Angel & Kris
- Baby Ranks
- Banda El Recodo
- Carlos Calderón - TV personality
- Chayanne
- Cristian Castro
- Daddy Yankee
- Dj Kane
- Enrique Iglesias
- Frankie J
- Ivy Queen
- Jackie Guerrido
- Jaime Camil
- Jorge Ramos - TV personality
- Karla Martínez - TV personality
- Kate del Castillo - Actress
- La Quinta Estación
- Laura Pausini
- Lena
- Lili Estefan - TV personality
- Luis Fonsi
- Obie Bermúdez
- Olga Tañón
- Pablo Montero
- Rafael Mercadante - Actor
- RBD
- Roberto Gómez Bolaños
- Shakira
- Sissi - TV personality
- Tonny Tun Tun
- Wisín & Yandel

== Performers ==
- Anaís
- Angel & Khriz
- Baby Ranks - "Mayor Que Yo"
- Chayanne - "No Te Preocupes Por Mí"
- Cristian Castro - "Amor Eterno"
- Daddy Yankee - "Mayor Que Yo"
- Ivy Queen - "Cuéntale"
- La Quinta Estación - "Algo Más"
- Luis Fonsi - "Nada Es Para Siempre"
- Olga Tañón - "Vete Vete"
- RBD - "Solo Quédate En Silencio"
- Tonny Tun Tun - "Mayor Que Yo"
- Wisin & Yandel - "Mayor Que Yo"

== Winners and nominees ==
Daddy Yankee and Shakira were the leading nominees, both with 8 nominations. Mexican group RBD follows with 5 nominations in various categories.

The night's biggest winners were Daddy Yankee and Shakira. Other takers included RBD and Jennifer Lopez, with four and two statuettes respectively. In Sports, famous baseball shortstop Alex Rodríguez ("Most Electrifying Guy Jock"), and Mexican track and field phenom Ana Guevara ("Most Electrifying Gal Jock") each received statuettes.

=== Music ===
| La Pareja Más Pareja (Dynamic Duet) | ¡Qué Rico se Mueve! (Best Moves) |
|---|---|
| Shakira with Alejandro Sanz - "La Tortura": Belinda with Moderatto - "Muriendo Lento"; Jennifer Lopez with Marc Anthony - "Escapémonos"; Ninel Conde with José Manuel Figueroa - "Callados" | Shakira: Chayanne; David Bisbal; Dulce María |
| Voz del Momento - Masculino (I Hear Him Everywhere) | Voz del Momento - Femenina (I Hear Her Everywhere) |
| Daddy Yankee: Chayanne; David Bisbal; Juanes | Shakira: Ivy Queen; Laura Pausini; Olga Tañón |
| Voz Del Momento (Grupo) (I Hear Them Everywhere) | La Más Pegajosa (Catchiest Tune) |
| RBD: AB Quintanilla and Kumbia Kings; Intocable; La 5ª Estación | "Gasolina" - Daddy Yankee: "La Camisa Negra" - Juanes; "La Tortura" - Shakira and Alejandro Sanz; "Rebelde" - RBD |
| Me Muero Sin Ese CD (CD To Die For) | Mi concierto favorito (My Favorite Concert) |
| Rebelde - RBD: Barrio Fino - Daddy Yankee; Fijación Oral Vol. 1 - Shakira; Mi Sangre - Juanes | Daddy Yankee: David Bisbal; Juanes; Paulina Rubio |
| Canción Corta-venas (Best Ballad) | Mi Artista Regional Mexicano Favorito Es... (Favorite Regional Mexican Artist) |
| "Solo Quédate En Silencio" - RBD: "Amor del bueno" - Reyli; "Sálvame" - RBD; "Víveme" - Laura Pausini | Ana Bárbara: Intocable; Lupillo Rivera; Vicente Fernández |
| Mi Artista Rock Favorito Es... (Favorite Rock Artist) | Mi Artista Pop Favorito Es... (Favorite Pop Artist) |
| Shakira | Shakira: Chayanne; David Bisbal; Juanes |
| Mi Artista Tropical Favorito Es... (Favorite Tropical Artist) | Mi Artista Urbano Favorito Es... (Favorite Urban Artist) |
| Olga Tañón: Aventura; Marc Anthony; Víctor Manuelle | Daddy Yankee: AB Quintanilla and Kumbia Kings; Don Omar; Ivy Queen |

=== Fashion and Images ===
| Quiero Vestir Como Ella (She's Totally Red Carpet) | El de Mejor Estilo (He's Got Style) |
|---|---|
| Jennifer Lopez: Anahí; Dulce María; Thalía | Daddy Yankee: Alfonso Herrera; Chayanne; Christopher von Uckermann |
| Chica Que Me Quita el Sueño (Girl that takes the sleep away) | ¡Está Buenísimo! (What a Hottie!) |
| Bárbara Mori: Anahí; Dulce María; Thalía | Daddy Yankee: Alfonso Herrera; Chayanne; Christopher von Uckermann |

=== Movies ===
| ¡Qué Actorazo! (Can He Act or What?) | Actriz que se Roba la Pantalla (She Steals the Show) |
|---|---|
| Gael García Bernal: Andy García; Benicio del Toro; Diego Luna | Jennifer Lopez: Catalina Sandino; Penélope Cruz; Salma Hayek |
Película Más Padre (Favorite Flick)
Spanglish: Diarios de Motocicleta; María, llena eres de gracia; Un día sin mexicanos

=== Pop Culture ===
| Mi Idolo Es (My Idol Is) | Tórridos Romances (Hottest Romance) |
|---|---|
| RBD: Daddy Yankee; Shakira; Thalía | Dulce María and Alfonso Herrera: Aracely Arámbula and Luis Miguel; Jennifer Lopez and Marc Anthony; Niurka Marcos and Bobby Larios |
| En la Mira de los Paparazzi (Paparazzi's Favorite Target) | Los Más Buscados (The Most Searched Online) |
| Luis Miguel: Jennifer Lopez; Niurka and Bobby; Thalía | Daddy Yankee |

=== Sports ===
| El Deportista de Alto Voltaje (Most Electrifying Guy Jock) | La Deportista de Alta Tensión (Most Electrifying Girl Jock) |
|---|---|
| Alex Rodríguez - Baseball: Cuauhtémoc Blanco - Football; Oswaldo Sánchez - Football; Rafael Márquez - Football | Ana Guevara: Fabiola Zuluaga - Tenis; Lorena Ochoa - Golf; Maribel Domínguez - Football |
| Me Pongo la Camiseta de... (I'm a Die-Hard Fan of...) | Novato del Año (Rookie that Rocks) |
| New York Yankees: Las Águilas; Las Chivas; Selección Mexicana | Guillermo Ochoa: Alfredo Talavera - Football; Carlos Arroyo - Basketball; Rafael Nadal - Tenis |
| Encontronazos Clásicos (Most Explosive Rivals) | Golazo del Año (What a Goal!) |
| Águilas del América Vs. Chivas del Guadalajara: Argentina Vs. Brasil; México Vs. Brasil; Tecos de la Universidad Autónoma Vs. Águilas del América | Adriano: Adolfo Bautista; Jared Borgetti; Cuauhtémoc Blanco |
