= Te He Querido, Te He Llorado =

2005 single by Ivy Queen

- Remix cover

Single by Ivy Queen

from the album Mas Flow 2 and Flashback
- Released: February 4, 2005
- Recorded: 2004–2005
- Studio: Mas Flow Studios, Carolina, Puerto Rico
- Genre: Reggaetón; Bachata
- Length: 4:14
- Label: Univision; Filtro
- Songwriters: Martha Pesante; Francisco Saldaña; Ernesto Padilla
- Producer: Luny Tunes

Ivy Queen singles chronology
"Cuéntale" (2005)	"Te He Querido, Te He Llorado" (2005)	"Libertad" (2006)

"Te He Querido, Te He Llorado" (English: "I Have Loved You, I Have Cried For You") is a song by Puerto Rican reggaetón recording artist Ivy Queen, from her fifth studio album, Flashback (2005). It was written by Queen, Francisco Saldaña, and Ernesto Padilla, produced by Luny Tunes, and released as the album's third single on February 4, 2005. Recorded in the wake of controversial events surrounding her marriage, it was featured on Luny Tunes' reggaeton compilation album Mas Flow 2 (2005) before Flashback (2005) was released. A remix version was also recorded and released as a single for Ednita Nazario's twenty-second studio album Apasionada Live (2006).

Te He Querido, Te He Llorado is considered one of Ivy Queen's signature songs, and it is also one of her most popular hits as well. It is a mixture of reggaeton and bachata known as bachaton or bachateo. The song's accompanying music video was filmed in Miami, Florida. It was directed by Marlon Peña. Becoming a commercial success, it reached the Top 10 of both the Billboard Top Latin Songs and Billboard Latin Rhythm Airplay charts. Ivy Queen also performed the song as a part of the setlist of her 2008 World Tour which was held from the José Miguel Agrelot Coliseum known as the Coliseum of Puerto Rico in San Juan, Puerto Rico.

== Background ==
Following the failed commercial success of Queen's first two studio albums, Queen was dropped from the Sony label and took a hiatus from her musical career in 1999. Returning to the music industry with her third studio album, Diva, which was highly anticipated and acclaimed and later recognized as a factor in reggaeton's mainstream exposure in 2004 along with Daddy Yankee's Barrio Fino and Tego Calderon's El Enemy de los Guasíbiri, after being certified Platinum by the Recording Industry Association of America. She then began working on her fourth studio album Real. It too was a commercial success, to a lesser extent, despite initially being Queen's debut full-length English-language studio album. She then embarked on the "Reggaeton Tour 2004" which also featured other artist including Aldo Ranks and La Factoria in various South American countries including Ecuador where she performed songs such as "Papi Te Quiero" and "Tu No Puedes" in promotion of the album. This was her first tour in South America which began in 2004 and lead into 2005.

In June 2005, Ivy Queen partnered with the co-founder of Perfect Image Records, José Guadalupe to form Filtro Musik. This stemmed from Guadalupe parting ways with the other co-founder of Perfect Image Anthony Pérez who in turn would launch his own label The Roof Records. Filtro Musik's concept initially stemmed from its name which means filter in English. "I've been in this industry 15 years, and we have the ability to filter and pick the best" said Guadalupe. In the coming year, Univision signed the label to licensing plan to release the album in September 2005. As a result, "this ensured that the album was positioned in Latin and mainstream accounts that would normally not carry Latin product." Ivy Queen was previously married to fellow reggaeton artist Omar Navarro, known by his stage name Gran Omar. They were divorced in 2005 shortly before the release of Flashback, which influenced the composition of the album. She denied ever having found him in the act of adultery, while claiming that if she had found Navarro with another woman, she'd be in La Vega Alta, a prison for women in Puerto Rico. She also denied rumors that she had physically assaulted the woman she caught with Navarro. She stated they had not lived with each other for two months citing the "extensive travels of her husband and his workload of being a producer" as being causes to the end of the nine-year marriage.

== Composition ==
"Te He Querido, Te He Llorado"
A 30-second sample of the second single "Te He Querido, Te He Llorado" featuring a bachatón/bachateo type beat that combines the sounds of reggaeton and bachata.

"Te He Querido, Te He Llorado" was written by Ivy Queen herself. The song was produced for Luny Tunes' reggaeton compilation album Mas Flow 2 (2005). It was later included on Queen's fifth studio album Flashback (2005). The song is a blend of reggaetón and bachata music known as bachaton or bachateo, a musical movement in the Dominican Republic and Puerto Rico which combines bachata melodies and reggaeton style beats, lyrics, rapping, and disc jockeying. Ivy Queen uses "bachata's signature guitar sound" and "slower more romantic rhythm" while incorporating "bachata's exaggerated emotional singing style" in this song as well as in "La Mala". Lyrically, the song calls for violence and revenge over a former lover. It "evokes the story of Lupe's "Amor Gitano". It begins with Queen "declaring her unwavering love for her partner," later describing him as a "liar, cheater, and abused who made her suffer." Queen threatens her former lover with a dagger, threatening to kill him with it, telling of the horrible life that awaits him. Queen "reverses the typical bolero structure by actively rejecting the assumption that her role as the woman is to suffer, instead imagining that she would inflict particularly violent forms of suffering on her former male lover". It features major key tonality, simple harmonic progressions, "angry-romantic" lyrics, Puerto Rican and Caribbean roots and Afro-Latin as well as Caribbean influences according to the Music Genome Project.

== Release and chart performance ==
"Te He Querido, Te He Llorado" was released in late 2005 by Univision. It became a commercial success on the Billboard charts, reaching the Top 10 of two of them and becoming one of the recognized reggaetón songs in the music industry. On the Billboard Hot Latin Songs chart, the song debuted at No. 38 for the week of December 3, 2005 and peaked at No. 10 for the week of February 4, 2006. The song occupying the ninth spot was "Cuéntale" also by Ivy Queen which ultimately reached No. 3 on the chart. On the Billboard Latin Pop Airplay chart, the song debuted at No. 38 on the week of December 3, 2005 being the only other debut that week behind "Yo Voy" by Zion & Lennox featuring Daddy Yankee at No. 37 and peaked at No. 26 on the week of January 7, 2006.

=== Critical reception ===
According to Jesus Trivino of Latina magazine, "Te He Querido, Te He Llorado" is the best song released by Queen during "Reggaetón's Golden Era" which lasted from 2003 until 2007. Another editor for Latina, Rocsi Diaz, the song speaks of "the ultimate form of karma". According to the Dominican Times, the song "will wake the pain of those whom have loved without being loved back". In 2022, Rolling Stone listed the song at number 36 on its list of the 100 Greatest Reggaeton Songs of All Time.

== Music video ==
In the music video, Queen is shown arguing with her husband during a party. His hand is up, because he is about to hit her in the face. She reminisces about this moment throughout the whole music video.

The music video revolves around a cheating husband and his wife (Ivy Queen) who get into an argument at a party. The video begins with a taxi driving through the streets of an unknown location. The first scene starts with Ivy Queen in a darkened room and then the taxi. The music video goes back and forth between the room and taxi until the party, and the husband answers his phone away from Queen, while she is singing the hook, she looks at him angrily. It switches between the party and the darkened room until he is finished talking and they immediately start arguing as their guest watch. It then goes to a new background, what looks like an abandoned warehouse that has Ivy sitting in a wooden chair. It then returns to the party where the argument has escalated, and he slaps her. Between the darkened room, taxi, and abandoned warehouse the music video continues with flashbacks of what happened at the party. Then, Queen is shown with a black cord phone singing in the abandoned warehouse. The last scene shows Queen in the abandoned warehouse which actually turns out to be a police station where her abuser is in containment. She puts her hand to the window, he does the same. Another flashback plays and she gets up and leaves. She is then shown in the taxi going the opposite direction she was going in the beginning of the video.

A music video for the song was filmed and directed by Marlon Peña. Although it has not been posted to any of Queen's official accounts, there are multiple postings of the song on YouTube that have garnered over one million views each, including: 33,261,897 views, 18,017,489 views, the official audio from the Mas Flow 2 album, which was posted to Luny Tunes’ official YouTube channel on April 13, 2016, with 1,637,288 views, and 1,142,694 views, bringing the total to 54,059,368 views, as of September 2025.

== Charts ==
=== Weekly charts ===
Chart (2006)	Position
US Latin Songs (Billboard)	10
US Latin Pop Airplay (Billboard)	26
US Latin Tropical Airplay (Billboard) Remix version	23
US Latin Rhythm Airplay (Billboard)	6

=== First-quarter charts ===
Chart (2006)	Position
US Latin Songs (Billboard)	14

=== Year-end charts ===
Chart (2006)	Position
US Latin Songs (Billboard)	37
US Latin Rhythm Airplay (Billboard)	26

== Cover versions ==
"Te He Querido, Te He Llorado" was covered by "La Agresiva del Mambo" Yolaime, and released as the first single from her debut studio album Simplemente Yolaime (2011) shortened to "Te He Querido" while serving as her debut single. Combining merengue and urban music, the song is a fusion of Ivy Queen's "Te He Querido, Te He Llorado. A music video for the single was also filmed. The music video has been seen by and accepted by thousands of people on the video sharing website YouTube which was directed by Amable Martinez.
