= Libertad (song) =

Single by Ivy Queen

from the album Flashback
- Released: February 2006
- Recorded: 2005; Marroneo Studios (Bayamón, Puerto Rico)
- Genre: Reggaetón
- Length: 3:29
- Label: Univision, Filtro
- Songwriter: Martha Pesante
- Producer: Rafi Mercenario

Ivy Queen singles chronology
"Te He Querido, Te He Llorado" (2005)	"Libertad" (2006)	"No Hacen Na" (2006)

"Libertad" (English: Freedom) is a song by Puerto Rican recording artist Ivy Queen, from her fifth studio album, Flashback (2005). It was composed by Queen, produced by Rafi Mercenario, and released as the second out of three singles from the album via Airplay in 2005. It was later released as promotional single in 2006. It is one of four new tracks from the album produced by Mercenario, the most requested producer in reggaetón at the time. A promotional single was released in 2006 featuring two separate remixes, the instrumental of those remixes and the a cappella.

It is a reggaeton song taking influence from hip hop. Becoming a success in the Latin market, the song reached number thirteen on the Billboard Latin Songs chart, number twelve on the Billboard Tropical Airplay chart and number nine on the Billboard Latin Rhythm Airplay chart. It was also included on Queen's first extended play (EP) entitled e5. Ivy Queen also performed the song as a part of the set of her 2008 World Tour which was held from the José Miguel Agrelot Coliseum known as the Coliseum of Puerto Rico in San Juan, Puerto Rico.

== Background ==
Following the failed commercial success of Queen's first two studio albums, Queen was dropped from the Sony label and took a hiatus from her musical career in 1999. Returning to the music industry with her third studio album, Diva, which was highly anticipated and acclaimed and later recognized as a factor in reggaeton's mainstream exposure in 2004 along with Daddy Yankee's Barrio Fino and Tego Calderon's El Enemy de los Guasíbiri, after being certified Platinum by the Recording Industry Association of America. She then began working on her fourth studio album Real. It too was a commercial success, to a lesser extent, despite initially being Queen's debut full-length English-language studio album. She then embarked on the "Reggaeton Tour 2004" which also featured other artist including Aldo Ranks and La Factoria in various South American countries including Ecuador where she performed songs such as "Papi Te Quiero" and "Tu No Puedes" in promotion of the album. This was her first tour in South America which began in 2004 and lead into 2005.

In June 2005, Ivy Queen partnered with co-founder of Perfect Image Records, José Guadalupe to form Filtro Musik. This stemmed from Guadalupe parting ways with the other co-founder of Perfect Image Anthony Pérez who in turn would launch his own label The Roof Records. Filtro Musik's concept initially stemmed from its name which means filter in English. "I've been in this industry 15 years, and we have the ability to filter and pick the best" said Guadalupe. In the coming year, Univision signed the label to licensing plan to release the album in September 2005. As a result, "this ensured that the album was positioned in Latin and mainstream accounts that would normally not carry Latin product." Ivy Queen was previously married to fellow reggaeton artist Omar Navarro, known by his stage name Gran Omar. They were divorced in 2005 shortly before the release of Flashback, which influenced the composition of the album. She denied ever having found him in the act of adultery, while claiming that if she had found Navarro with another woman, she'd be in La Vega Alta, a prison for women in Puerto Rico. She also denied rumors that she had physically assaulted the woman she caught with Navarro. She stated they had not lived with each other for two months citing the "extensive travels of her husband and his workload of being a producer" as being causes to the end of the nine-year marriage.

== Composition ==
Ivy Queen "Libertad" (2005)
A 21 second sample of the second single "Libertad". In the lyrics, Queen is asking her former lover who is she for him to play with her heart assuring him that she is going to the club with a miniskirt to celebrate the newly gained freedom.

"Libertad" was written by Queen herself and produced by Rafi Mercenario, the most requested producer in reggaetón at the time. It was the last of the four new tracks on the album produced by Mercenario, the others being the lead single "Cuéntale", "Marroneo", and the "reggaetón-ed up twist" on Selena's classic "Si Una Vez".

Being was composed in minor key, It features danceable grooves, synthetic instrumentation and synthesizers as she takes influences from Afro-Latin music. Queen appears infuriated in the lyrics where she asks a former lover "who the hell am I so that you may play with my heart. This has finished. Go look for another idiotic stupid woman. I'm going to the club with a miniskirt to celebrate my freedom."

== Track listing ==
- Album Version
1. "Libertad" — 3:29
- Extended Play (EP)
1. "Cuéntale" — 3:22
2. "Libertad" — 3:29
3. "Te He Querido, Te He Llorado" — 4:17
4. "Quiero Bailar" — 3:03
5. "Quiero Saber" — 2:51
- Live Version
1. "Libertad" (Coliseum of Puerto Rico) — 3:54
- Promo Single
1. "Libertad" (Bones Remix) — 3:32
2. "Libertad" (Instrumental) (Bones Remix) — 3:32
3. "Libertad" (Hip Hop) — 3:35
4. "Libertad" (Instrumental) (Hip Hop) — 3:35
5. "Libertad" (A Capella) — 3:22

== Credits and personnel ==
- Album Version
  - Composer: Martha Ivelisse Pesante
  - Producer: Rafi Mercenario
  - Audio Production: Rafi Mercenario
- Extended Play (EP)
  - Composer: Martha Ivelisse Pesante
  - Producer: Rafi Mercenario
  - Audio Production: Rafi Mercenario
- Promo Single
  - Composer: Martha Ivelisse Pesante (All tracks)
  - Producer: Bones (Tracks 1–2)
  - Producer(s): Jose "2Ton" Batista & Raul Cela (R.CLA) (Tracks 3–4)
  - Audio Production: Rafi Mercenario (Track 5)
  - Mixing: Jose "2 Ton" Batista at Lobo Recording Studios in Deer Park, New York
- Live Version
  - Mixing Engineer: Arnaldo Santo "Naldo" & Miguel Pequero
  - Musical Director: Miguel Márquez "Escobar"
  - Bass: José Aponte
  - Guitar: Juan C. Rodríguez
  - Keyboards: Andres Arroyo "Zoprano"
  - Drums: Antonio Alonso "Papito"
  - Percussion: Omar Soto "Pooh"
  - Chorus 1: Julio Cartagena "Corbata"
  - Chorus 2: Zulma Oviedo
  - Chorus 3: Orlando Rosario "Orlandito"
  - DJ: David Montañez "DJ Davey"
  - Sound: Comco Audio
  - Sound Engineer Monitors: Ryan Vargas
  - Sound Engineer FOH: Manuel Comulada

== Charts ==
"Libertad" peaked at number thirteen of the Billboard Hot Latin Songs chart for the week of April 6, 2006. On the Billboard Latin Rhythm Airplay chart, the song peaked at number nine for the week of April 1, 2006 becoming the twenty-eighth best performing Latin Rhythm single of 2006. On the Billboard Latin Tropical Airplay chart, the song peaked at number twelve for the week of March 25, 2006.

=== Weekly charts ===
Chart (2006)	Peak Position
US Latin Songs (Billboard)	13
US Latin Tropical Airplay (Billboard)	12
US Latin Rhythm Airplay (Billboard)	9

=== Year-end charts ===
Chart (2006)	Position
US Latin Rhythm Airplay (Billboard)	28
