= Cuéntale =

2005 single by Ivy Queen

Single by Ivy Queen

from the album Flashback
- Released: September 2005
- Recorded: 2005
- Studio: Marroneo Studios
- Venue: Bayamón, Puerto Rico
- Genre: Reggaetón
- Length: 3:22
- Label: Univision, Filtro
- Songwriter: Martha Pesante
- Producer: Rafi Mercenario

Ivy Queen singles chronology
"Angel Caido" (2004)	"Cuéntale" (2005)	"Te He Querido, Te He Llorado" (2005)

"Cuéntale" (English: Tell Her) is a song by Puerto Rican recording artist Ivy Queen, from her fifth studio album Flashback (2005). It was composed by Queen, produced by Rafi Mercenario and released as the lead single off the album via radio airplay in September 2005. It marked Ivy Queen's first single in almost a year since "Angel Caido" being released in 2004. It is a reggaeton track that features influences from reggae. In June 2005, Ivy Queen partnered with co-founder of Perfect Image Records, José Guadalupe to form Filtro Musik. The song was included on the soundtrack of EA Sports' 2006 FIFA World Cup Germany video game. Ivy Queen performed the song at the 2005 Premios Juventud award ceremony where she was nominated for Favorite Urban Artist. The song was a success in the United States and Puerto Rico reaching the Top 10 of the Billboard Hot Latin Songs, Latin Rhythm Airplay, and #1 on the Latin Tropical Airplay while becoming Ivy Queen's first and only single on the Bubbling Under Hot 100 chart.

== Background ==
Following the failed commercial success of Queen's first two studio albums, Queen was dropped from the Sony label and took a hiatus from her musical career in 1999. Returning to the music industry with her third studio album, Diva, which was highly anticipated and acclaimed and later recognized as a factor in reggaeton's mainstream exposure in 2004 along with Daddy Yankee's Barrio Fino and Tego Calderon's El Enemy de los Guasíbiri, after being certified Platinum by the Recording Industry Association of America. She then began working on her fourth studio album Real. It too was a commercial success, to a lesser extent, despite initially being Queen's debut full-length English-language studio album. She then embarked on the "Reggaeton Tour 2004" which also featured other artist including Aldo Ranks and La Factoria in various South American countries including Ecuador where she performed songs such as "Papi Te Quiero" and "Tu No Puedes" in promotion of the album. This was her first tour in South America which began in 2004 and lead into 2005.

In June 2005, Ivy Queen partnered with co-founder of Perfect Image Records, José Guadalupe to form Filtro Musik. This stemmed from Guadalupe parting ways with the other co-founder of Perfect Image Anthony Pérez who in turn would launch his own label The Roof Records. Filtro Musik's concept initially stemmed from its name which means filter in English. "I've been in this industry 15 years, and we have the ability to filter and pick the best" said Guadalupe. In the coming year, Univision signed the label to licensing plan to release the album in September 2005. As a result, "this ensured that the album was positioned in Latin and mainstream accounts that would normally not carry Latin product." Ivy Queen was previously married to fellow reggaeton artist Omar Navarro, known by his stage name Gran Omar. They were divorced in 2005 shortly before the release of Flashback, which influenced the composition of the album. She denied ever having found him in the act of adultery, while claiming that if she had found Navarro with another woman, she'd be in La Vega Alta, a prison for women in Puerto Rico. She also denied rumors that she had physically assaulted the woman she caught with Navarro. She stated they had not lived with each other for two months citing the "extensive travels of her husband and his workload of being a producer" as being causes to the end of the nine-year marriage.

== Composition ==
Ivy Queen "Cuéntale" (2005)
An 18 second sample of the lead single "Cuéntale". The song address her lover letting him know that Queen wants him to pick between her and his wife.

"Cuéntale", "a sizzling hit" according to Jonathan Widran of Allmusic, was written by Queen herself, and produced by Rafi Mercenario, the most requested producer in reggaetón at the time. It is one of four of the new tracks on the album produced by Mercenario; the others being "Marroneo", the "reggaetón-ed up twist" on Selena's classic "Si Una Vez" and the last single of the album "Libertad".

Musically, it features "danceable grooves, synthetic instrumentation and synthesizers" while taking influences from Afro Latin and reggae music; it is set in minor key. Lyrically, the lead single off the album has Ivy Queen exploring lyrical content as she tells a story of "a mistress who tells her lover to pick between her and his wife". She explained "the mistress just gets tired of seeing him for a short time and listening to him complain about his unloving wife". It was the first single in over a year since "Dile" being released in 2004.

== Release and chart performance ==
The song was released as the album's lead single in September 2005. On the Billboard Hot Latin Songs chart, "Cuéntale" peaked at number three for the week of November 19, 2005. On the Billboard Latin Rhythm Airplay chart, the song peaked at number four for the week of November 12, 2012. On the Billboard Latin Tropical Airplay chart, the song reached number one for the week of November 5, 2005 replacing "Amor De Una Noche" by N'Klabe, being succeeded by "Amor De Una Noche" a week later. On the Billboard Bubbling Under Hot 100 chart, the song peaked at number fourteen for the week ending December 31, 2005. Meaning, the song had potential to chart of the Billboard Hot 100 chart, technically peaking on that chart at number 114. "Te He Querido, Te He Llorado", the third single from the album peaked at number ten on the Billboard Hot Latin Songs chart. "Cuéntale" kept the song from reaching the top nine of the chart.

== Accolades ==
=== Broadcast Music, Inc. Awards ===
Broadcast Music, Inc. (BMI) annually hosts award shows that honor the songwriters, composers and music publishers of the year's most-performed songs in the BMI catalog. "Cuéntale" was awarded "Award-Winning Song" at the 2007 BMI Music Awards where "Te He Querido, Te He Llorado" was also presented the award.

Year	Nominee / work	Award	Result
2007	"Cuéntale"	Award-Winning Songs	Won

=== International Dance Music Awards ===
The International Dance Music Awards are presented annually by the Winter Music Conference in the United States. "Cuéntale" was nominated for "Best Latin/Reggaetón Track" at the 22nd Annual International Dance Music Awards, which was ultimately won Shakira and Wyclef Jean with their #1 single "Hips Don't Lie". Among others nominated were "Rompe" by Daddy Yankee, "Dale Don Dale" by Don Omar, and "Rakata" by Wisin & Yandel.

Year	Nominee / work	Award	Result
2007	"Cuéntale"	Best Latin/Reggaetón Track	Nominated

== Charts ==
=== Weekly charts ===
Chart (2005)	Position
US Radio Songs (Billboard)	83
US Bubbling Under Hot 100 (Billboard)	14
US Latin Songs (Billboard)	3
US Latin Rhythm Airplay (Billboard)	4
US Latin Tropical Airplay (Billboard)	1

=== First-quarter charts ===
Chart (2006)	Position
US Hot Latin Songs (Billboard)	7

=== Year-end charts ===
Chart (2006)	Position
US Hot Latin Songs (Billboard)	24
US Latin Rhythm Airplay (Billboard)	14

=== Decade-end charts ===
Chart (2000s)	Position
US Latin Rhythm Airplay (Billboard)	???

== Cover versions ==
"Cuéntale"

Single by La Conquista

from the album Muévelo
- Released: 2007
- Recorded: 2006
- Genre: Reggaetón, Cumbia
- Length: 3:16
- Label: Univision
- Songwriter: Martha Ivelisse Pesante
- Producers: A.B. Quintanilla, Brian "Red" Moore, Rafi Mercenario

La Conquista singles chronology
"Muévelo" (2007)	"Cuéntale" (2007)	"Dame Tu Amor" (2007)

=== La Conquista ===
Cumbia-pop group La Conquista covered the track on their third studio album Muévelo in 2007. It was released as the album's second single following the title track by Univision Records. It was produced by A.B. Quintanilla, while Brain "Red" Moore handled additional production including arranging, mixing and mastering.

It also samples the beat of the original song. John Witzgall of Allmusic felt it, along with the album was "destined (or even designed?) to be quickly forgotten, which is a shame, because this talented group seems capable of much more campy, danceable fun".

== See also ==
List of number-one Billboard Hot Tropical Songs of 2005
