= Contra la Corriente (Noriega album) =

Compilation album by Noriega
- Released: October 12, 2004
- Genre: Reggaeton
- Label: Flow Music
- Producers: Noriega (Exec.); DJ Nelson (Co-exec.); DJ Sonic; Luny Tunes; Nely "El Arma Secreta"; Rafy Mercenario; DJ Giann; Santana; Mambo Kingz

Noriega chronology
Mas Flow (2003)	Contra la Corriente (2004)	Sin Control (2006)

Contra la Corriente (English: Against the Current) is the debut production album by reggaeton producer Noriega after releasing the previous year Mas Flow with Luny Tunes. Many of reggaeton biggest stars were included on the album including Alexis & Fido, Tito "El Bambino", Zion & Lennox and Ivy Queen.

== Track listing ==
1. "Intro"
2. "Tócale Bocina" (by Alexis & Fido) (Produced by Noriega, DJ Nelson, DJ Sonic)
3. "Te Encontraré" (by Tito "El Bambino") (Produced by Noriega, Luny Tunes)
4. "No Tengas Miedo" (by Zion & Lennox)
5. "Quítate La Ropa" (by Tony Dize) (Produced by Noriega, Nely)
6. "Si Te Vas" (by Kartier)
7. "Yo Tengo El Control" (by Cheka) (Produced by Noriega, Rafy Mercenario, DJ Nelson)
8. "Linda Estrella" (by Baby Rasta)
9. "Que Daría Yo" (by Las Guanábanas)
10. "Amiga No Pienses" (by Ivy Queen) (Produced by Noriega, DJ Nelson)
11. "Tú y Yo Nena" (by John Eric)
12. "Como Lo Bailas Tú" (by Mickey Perfecto)
13. "Más Fuerte" (by Angel & Khriz ft. Taina) (Produced by Noriega, DJ Nelson, DJ Giann, Santana)
14. "Vámonos A Toa" (by Master Joe & O.G. Black)
15. "Ven y Baila" (by Valerie Morales)
16. "Viento" (by Ranking Stone)
17. "Desespero" (by Nashaly & Julio Voltio)
18. "Vuelve A Mí" (by Yaga & Mackie)
19. "Suelta" (by Johnny Prez)
20. "Tú y Yo" (by Sabios)
21. "Escápate Conmigo" (by Maicol & Manuel) (Produced by Noriega)
22. "Move Dale Mami" (by Shaka & Waco)
23. "Amiga No Pienses (Salsa Remix)" (by Ivy Queen) (Produced by Noriega, DJ Nelson, and Luny Tunes)

== Charts ==
Chart (2004)	Peak position
U.S. Billboard Top Latin Albums	36
U.S. Billboard Top Tropical Albums	7
U.S. Billboard Top Reggae Albums	7
