= Johnny Prez =

Puerto Rican reggaetón musician

- Born: December 4, 1978 (age 47)
- Origin: Las Piedras, Puerto Rico
- Genres: Reggaetón
- Occupation: Rapper
- Years active: 1989–1999 (group); 2002–2015 (solo); 2011–2013 (duo)
- Labels: Prime Sound; Diamond Music
- Formerly of: Kid Power Posse

Johnny Prez (or J Prez as he often calls himself) (Born December 4, 1978) is a reggaetón music artist from Las Piedras, Puerto Rico.

== Career ==
He used to belong to the group "Kid Power Posse" and the duo "Déificos," meaning "belong to God." recorded his first album of Spanish reggae, "Los Nenes De La Medicina" in 1992. Johnny Prez made Spanish reggae popular in Puerto Rico. Since then, he has released three Reggaetón albums, "El Dragón" in 2003, "The Prezident" in 2005, which reached number 14 in Billboard's Latin albums' chart, and "The Knockouts" in 2007. However, many feel he has not received the recognition that he deserves.

In 2011 he returned with his brother Pedro Prez in a duo called "Tha Prez". Actually Johnny is focused on his solo career, with singles like "Como Te Olvido" (with 2 remix with Nicky Jam and Mackie|Yaga y Mackie) and "Amor Diferente" with Baby Rasta & Gringo.

== Discography ==
=== Studio albums ===
- 2002: El Dragón
- 2005: The Prezident

=== Compilation albums ===
- 1995: The Black Dragón
- 2007: Knock Out
