= Ivy Queen =

Puerto Rican rapper (born 1972)

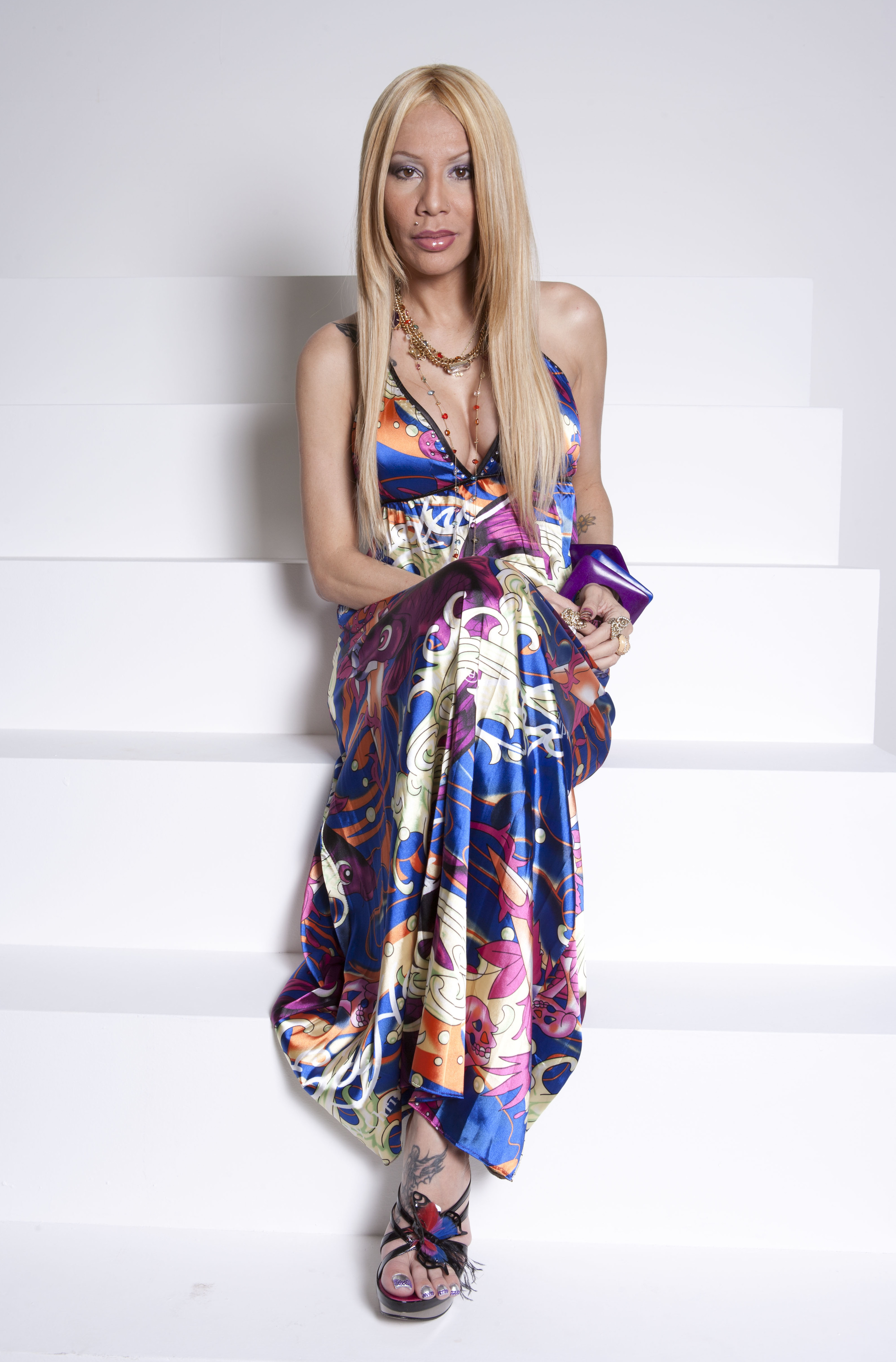
- Ivy Queen in 2010
- Born: Martha Ivelisse Pesante Rodríguez; March 4, 1972 (age 54); Añasco, Puerto Rico
- Other names: The Queen of Reggaeton; La Diva; La Caballota; La Potra; La Cocorota; La Mama de los Pollitos
- Occupations: Rapper; singer; songwriter; actress
- Years active: 1995–present
- Spouses: Omar Navarro (m. 1994; div. 2005); Xavier Sánchez (m. 2012; sep. 2024)
- Musical career
- Genres: Reggaetón; hip hop; Latin
- Labels: Sony Discos (1997–99); Real (2003–04); Universal Latino (2004); Univision (2005–08); Drama (2007–12); Machete (2010–12); Siente (2012–present); Ivy Queen Musa Sound (2012–present)

Martha Ivelisse Pesante Rodríguez (born March 4, 1972), known professionally as Ivy Queen, is a Puerto Rican rapper and singer. She is considered one of the pioneers of the reggaeton genre. Dubbed the Queen of Reggaeton, she is one of the most influential reggaeton artists of all time.

Ivy Queen began her career as a member of the otherwise all-male collective The Noise in San Juan, Puerto Rico. There, she performed her first song "Somos Raperos Pero No Delincuentes" (We are Rappers, Not Delinquents). Ivy Queen went solo in 1996, and released her debut studio album En Mi Imperio (In My Empire) which was quickly picked up by Sony Discos for distribution in 1997.

She later released The Original Rude Girl, her second studio album for Sony label, which spawned the hit single "In the Zone". However, Ivy Queen did not rise to fame until she moved to an independent record label to release her third studio album, Diva in 2003. Ivy Queen's albums Diva, Flashback, and Sentimiento have all been awarded Gold and Platinum record status by the Recording Industry Association of America (RIAA). Her seventh studio album Drama Queen was released in 2010, and spawned a top ten single "La Vida es Así". It was followed by the Grammy Award-nominated Musa in 2012. Ivy Queen's recordings often include themes of female empowerment, socio-political issues, infidelity, and relationships.

Ivy Queen is one of the wealthiest reggaeton artists and had a net worth of $10 million in 2017. She is also the host of the Spotify original podcast Loud, where she talks about the history of reggaeton and features prominent Latin artists. The 10-episode podcast debuted August 4, 2021 on Spotify, with episodes released weekly on Wednesdays.

== Early life ==
Ivy Queen was born in Añasco, Puerto Rico. When she was young, Queen's parents moved to New York, where she was raised. She did not finish high school, reaching eleventh grade in the United States, and studied music at the New Jersey Performing Arts Center.

== Musical career ==
=== 1995–99: The Noise, En Mi Imperio and The Original Rude Girl ===
When she was 18, Ivy Queen moved to San Juan, where she met rapper and producer DJ Negro. In 1995, Queen joined an all-male Puerto Rican group called the Noise, at the invitation of DJ Negro. The group became part of the emerging reggaeton scene. DJ Negro began producing a series of CDs centered around the Noise. Ivy Queen made her first appearance on the fifth installment of the CD series on a track called "Somos Raperos Pero No Delincuentes". She became tired of the violent and sexual themes often used in reggaeton, and wished to write about a wider variety of subjects.

DJ Negro convinced Queen to go solo, and in 1997 she recorded her first solo album, En Mi Imperio—which featured the hit single "Como Mujer"—for Sony Discos. In 1998, Queen launched her second album, The Original Rude Girl—which featured Don Chezina, Alex D'Castro, and Domingo Quiñones—and worked with Wyclef Jean on her debut single "In the Zone". The album is bilingual and features hip hop music, a departure from the reggaeton featured on her debut album. The Original Rude Girl was commercially unsuccessful but "In The Zone" charted at number 38 on the Billboard Rhythmic Top 40.

In 1999, after a lack of commercial success with her first two studio albums, Sony dropped Queen and she took a break from her musical career. Ivy Queen: La Reina del Reggaeton Trailblazing against Machismo - Luz Media In 2001 and 2002, Queen's music began appearing on reggaeton compilation albums, spawning hits like "Quiero Bailar" from The Majestic 2 and "Quiero Saber" from Kilates. With songs like "Quiero Bailar", Ivy Queen represented women "In a movement that took off commercially [and dominantly was led by men] with aggressively lyrics and a "doggiestyle perreo dance". Ivy Queen established herself as reggaeton's no-nonsense female conscience. (Her anthem "Quiero Baliar" warned her dance partner not to misinterpret those moves.)". In 2003, Queen and her then-husband Gran Omar signed with independent, Miami-based label Real Music, established by Jorge Guadalupe and Anthony Pérez. They appeared on the label's first album Jams Vol. 1. Queen frequently appeared and performed on the reggaeton television show "The Roof", which featured urban music and lifestyle, and was produced by Pérez.

=== 1999–2004: Diva and Real ===
In 2003, Ivy Queen released Diva, her third studio album. It spawned hit singles including "Quiero Bailar". The album is considered to have been important for exposing reggaeton to a mainstream audience in 2004. After the success of the album—which was certified platinum by the RIAA, Ivy Queen released a platinum edition of Diva in 2004. The platinum edition was nominated for "Reggaeton Album of the Year" at the 2005 Billboard Latin Music Awards. "Quiero Bailar", the album's lead single, became the first Spanish-language track to reach number one on the Rhythmic Top 40 chart of Miami's WPOW—an American radio station that does not usually play Spanish music.

Queen's fourth studio album, Real, was originally planned to be her first full-length English language album after she received contract offers from several record labels—including Sony. Queen said that it was a good opportunity to reach other markets, and in particular the competitive market of English rap. Sony's offer to record an English-language album came after they noticed that her previous Sony albums were being heard in London, thanks to the success of Diva. The album included collaborations with artists including Fat Joe, La India, Héctor Delgado, and Getto & Gastam. American hip-hop producer Swizz Beatz produced the track "Soldados". The album was released on November 16, 2004, and spawneed the Top 10 single "Dile" which was nominated for "Tropical Airplay Track of the Year, Female".

=== 2005–07: Flashback and Sentimiento ===
In 2005, Ivy Queen partnered with José Guadalupe—co-founder of Perfect Image Records—to form the record label Filtro Musik. Later that year, Univision Records signed Filtro Musik to promote Ivy Queen's fifth studio album Flashback (2005). This ensured that the album was positioned in Latin and mainstream accounts that would normally not carry Latin product. Queen's first compilation album The Best of Ivy Queen, consisting of tracks from Diva and Real, was released the same year. On October 29, 2005, she released Flashback, which contained the singles "Cuéntale", "Libertad", and "Te He Querido, Te He Llorado". At the 2006 Billboard Latin Music Awards, Flashback was nominated for "Reggaeton Album of the Year" for a second consecutive year. The following year, Ivy Queen, and Gran Omar presented the reggaeton and hip hop compilation album Cosa Nostra: Hip Hop. She later appeared on the Spanish-language recording of the Star-Spangled Banner, "Nuestro Himno". She then received the first Premio Juventud "Diva Award", which honored Queen for her musical career.

In April 2007, Ivy Queen released her sixth studio album entitled Sentimiento. She began working on the album in 2006 after Cosa Nostra became a commercial failure. As a part of her evolution in reggaetón, Sentimiento includes "solo turns" instead of duets with guest artists. The solo tracks include; "Pobre Corazón" by Divino, "Manaña Al Despertar" by Baby Rasta and Noriega—none of which feature Queen's vocals. She said she wanted to give a 180-degree turn to what people think of reggaetón. She said, "[m]any think reggaetón is just nice rhythms to dance to. And they forget there are song-writers and composers, who, like everyone else, also suffer and aspire in love ... Love is what makes us write things, what keeps us alive. If we did not have love, we would have nothing". The album spawned a Top 10 hit "Que Lloren" and the moderately successful singles "En Que Fallamos" and "Sentimientos". At the Latin Grammy Awards of 2007, Calle 13 won the Best Urban Music Album award for their album Residente o Visitante Queen's Sentimiento was nominated in the same category.

Calle 13's 2008 album "Los de Atrás Vienen Conmigo" included a song entitled "Que Lloren" which criticized Queen and asked her "to cut herself with a razor". She responded stating "I'm the queen of this genre, a genre that contains male rappers such as Don Omar, Wisin & Yandel and Tego Calderón who respect me a lot for an idiot to have my name in his mouth." After Calle 13 had won various awards in the urban music category, Queen called the duo to let them know publicly how she felt about them. She was unhappy because despite the abundance of awards and nominees, only Calle 13 received awards explaining "they dedicated the night to Calle 13." The duo called Queen a hypocrite.

=== 2008–10: Ivy Queen 2008 World Tour LIVE! and Drama Queen ===
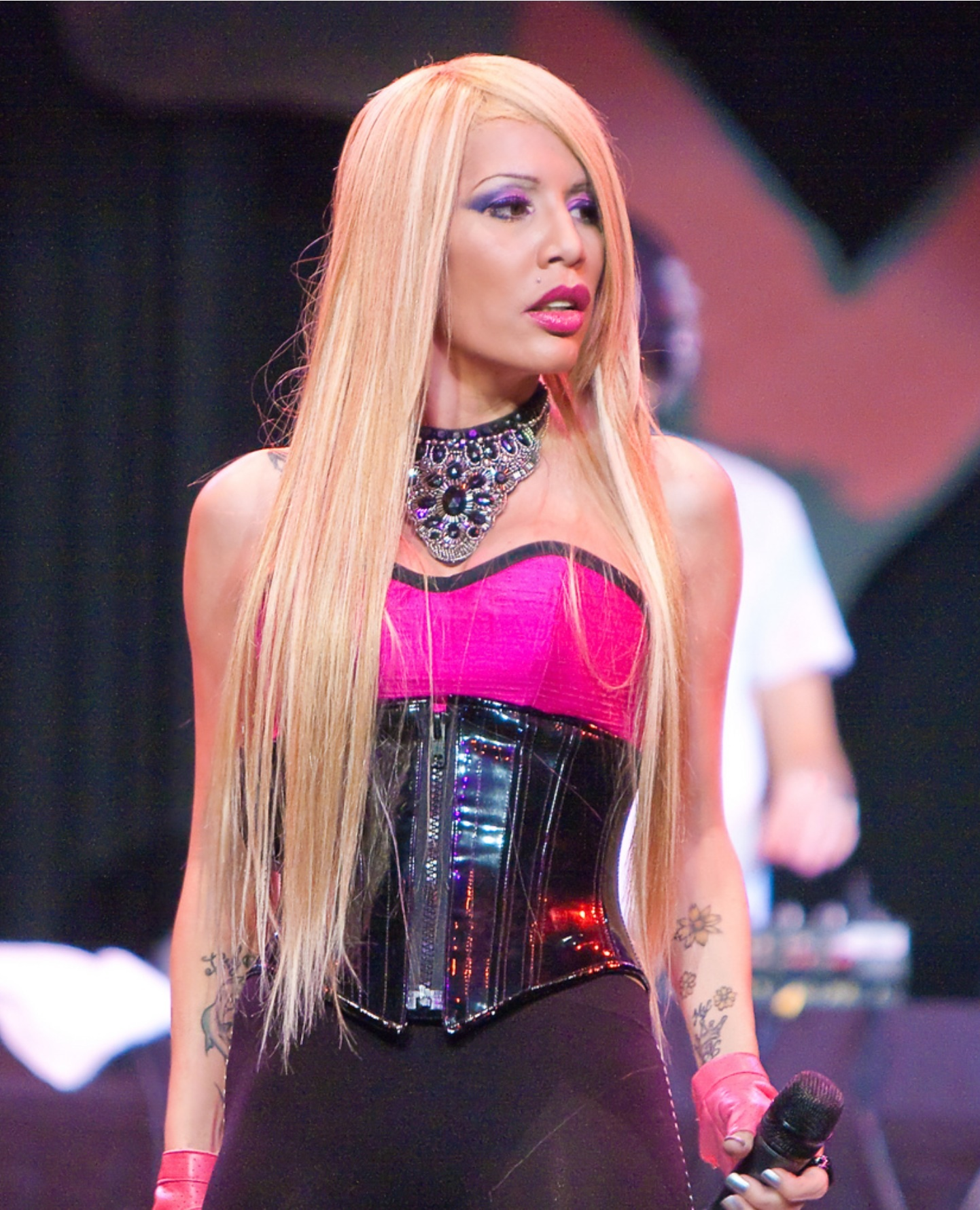
Queen performing in 2010

In 2008, Queen released the single "Dime", which was featured on her first live album Ivy Queen 2008 World Tour LIVE!. In April 2010, she was signed to Machete Music. The signing, described as a 360 deal, includes profit sharing in tours, sponsorships and merchandising. Univision Records, was acquired by Machete's parent company Universal Music Latin Entertainment in 2008. Walter Kolm, president of Universal Music Latino and Machete, said in a press release, "[i]t's a privilege to have Ivy Queen a part of our artistic roster. Ivy is an extraordinary woman with incomparable talent, and she's number one in her genre. We're happy to be able to work with her on her new album as well as future projects". Queen said of the partnership, "I'm very proud to be a part of Machete Music. They are a young, vibrant company that has created a name for itself in Latin music in the United States and the world. They are a strong and important company that has been recognized for nurturing their artists' creative talents ... ".

Drama Queen (2010), released on July 10, 2010, was originally intended to be released after her third compilation album Cosa Nostra: Hip-Hop (2006) as a concept album on which Ivy Queen would performing duets with female singers from different genres. Sentimiento was released instead. Queen told EFE that she started writing for the album while she was heartbroken at home. Her emotions then burst out in the recording studio. She added the album contains 16 of 26 songs she wrote during this period. When Latina Magazine asked her about the drama between the release of Sentimiento and Drama Queen, Queen said:

"I'm single. For the first time in my life, I'm really experiencing what that's like because I used to always feel the need to be in a relationship; I didn't like being alone. But this time I'm realizing that people come into your life for a season, and my last relationship served its purpose. I can't sit here and cry about it, because it ended right where it should have. A lot of that stuff is on the album."

Drama Queen sold 3,000 units in its first week and dominated urban album sales for nine consecutive weeks. It debuted and peaked at number 163 on the US Billboard 200 chart, number three on Top Latin Albums, and number 18 on Rap Albums. Drama Queen received a nomination for Best Urban Music Album at the 2011 Latin Grammy Awards, which was won by Calle 13 for Entren Los Que Quieran. Queen also received two nominations at the 2011 Latin Billboard Music Awards for Hot Latin Songs Artist of the Year, Female and Top Latin Albums Artist of the Year, Female. Shakira won both awards.

=== 2011–2021: Musa, Vendetta, Raiz No Rama Tour ===
On August 21, 2012, Queen's eighth studio album Musa was released. It debuted and peaked at number 15 on the Billboard Top Latin Albums chart. She said that spending two years away from the media has helped her emotionally and mentally. She also said that the album is "very mature and complete", because although her style is urban and reggaeton it also features fusions of rhythms and instruments with their own styles. The album managed a nomination for Best Urban Music Album at the Latin Grammy Awards of 2013.

It was announced in September 2013, that Queen had changed management and returned with Jorge "Goguito" Guadalupe, president and co-founder of Filtro Musik, to release her ninth studio album, entitled Vendetta in February 2014. Following the birth of her first biological child, Queen then announced that she would embark on a U.S. tour entitled the "Viva Puerto Rico Tour". The tour, launched on January 29, 2014, included performances at various gay clubs in cities of the United States and Puerto Rico, such as New York, Orlando, Miami, Houston, Seattle, San Francisco, San Diego, Atlanta, Sacramento, Los Angeles, Tampa, and Ponce.

Queen's ninth studio album was released on February 3, 2015. An extended play version of the album was released on December 9, 2014. The studio album version was originally announced for a release in February 2014, and later some time in 2014.

The extended play version of the album, entitled Vendetta: First Round, includes the first four singles from the album: "Soy Libre", "Vamos A Guerrear", "Naci Para Amarte", and the title track "Vendetta", on disc one. Disc two features a DVD with the music videos to these songs as well as a forty-five-minute documentary of the making of the album. Upon its release, it managed to debut at number thirty on the Billboard Latin Albums chart and number five on the Billboard Latin Rhythm Albums chart for the week of December 27, 2014.

The album is composed of four separate simultaneously released albums, in the genres of urban, hip hop, bachata and salsa. Each releases contains eight songs musically devoted to the specific genre. The urban releases features Farruko, J Alvarez, Jowell & Randy and J King & Maximan, the hip hop release features Vico C, Fat Joe, Ñengo Flow and MC Ceja, the salsa release features Tito Rojas, Andy Montañez and Luisito Carrión, while the bachata release features Óptimo.

In February 2020, Queen embarked on the Raiz No Rama World Tour, which was forced to end due to the Covid pandemic. Following this, Queen continued to work from home, recording new music.

=== 2023-present: Tenth studio album, continued recognition ===
In September 2023, Queen held her first concert in Puerto Rico in 15 years. In 2024, Queen became the first reggaeton artist to headline a concert at the Carnegie Hall.

In 2025, an Afrobeats — “Casi Casi” was released, the first in a series of singles to ultimately culminate with the release of her tenth studio album. Queen describes the album as a release for all generations of her fans.

== Musical style ==
=== Musical style ===
Queen's musical style is classified as reggaeton—an urban genre with roots in Latin and Caribbean music. However, Queen also performs in several other genres including hip hop, salsa, merengue, and bachata. Yoselín Acevedo of People en Español said that "'Cosas De La Vida'—which isn't her first bachata song, shows that other than being the 'Queen of Reggaeton' she can also easily convert herself into the 'Queen of Bachata'. Queen has also recorded salsa tracks, beginning in 2005 with "Amiga No Pienses" and "Yo Lamento", and in 2007 with "Si Eres Tú" which she recorded in a "big-band Salsa" style. She worked with salsa singers La India on "Cuando Hieres A Una Mujer" and Víctoria Sanabría on "No Te Quiero".

Queen cites Celia Cruz, La Lupe, and other "classic Salsa singers" as inspirations for her style of hip-hop music. Her main influence is Selena, to whom she pays tribute on her fifth studio album Flashback with a "reggaeton-ed up twist" on "Si Una Vez". She also said she enjoyed the songs "Como La Flor" and "La Carcacha". Queen told Ramiro Burr of the Houston Chronicle, "I admired Selena because she had that famous crossover success, but sadly she never got to enjoy it," she said. According to Allmusic, she takes influences from Jennifer Lopez, Queen Latifah, Gloria Estefan, Madonna and Salt-N-Pepa. Queen cites fellow American rapper Missy Elliott as an influence as well.

=== Lyrics and messaging ===
Ivy Queen "Mi Barrio" (2004)
An 18 second sample of the sociopolitical charged "Mi Barrio".

Queen said that to stand out in the male-dominated world of reggaeton, she would have to deliver a strong point of view from a female perspective, saying, "God blessed me with a powerful voice. It is not feminine. It is not masculine. It is just a thick voice." Queen also stated that her achievements are all due to the fact that she is an artist who, "always [has] something to say, something to contribute. [She] never came with empty rhythm or lyrics. [Men saw that] the girl that could write and sing and go to the platform and kill, as we say". She created music people's bodies could move to but was consistent in standing her ground and standing for agency and women empowerment. Instead of the vulgar lyrics common in reggaeton, Queen prefers to sing about defending women while touching on themes of social political matters, homosexuality, racism, love and heartbreak. Queen says she writes songs that "put bad men in their places or stand up for the single mothers". In "Que Lloren" she discusses romance from a woman's perspective while belittling the stereotype that men shouldn't cry or show emotions. In "Quiero Bailar" she "berates a lover who thinks that just because they dance she is automatically going to bed with him". According to Ivy, men commonly misinterpret consent to dance with sexual interest within reggaeton dance culture. Since beginning her career, Queen has wanted to create and compose songs "that have some kind of subject matter" so that people understand the concept and message. "Mi Barrio" is a socio-political charged song which criticizes "the problems present in Añasco, Puerto Rico". Queen compared the song to "Corazones" by Daddy Yankee from his album Barrio Fino.

== Legacy ==
According to Jon Pareles of the New York Times, Queen is the "only significant female reggaeton rapper". She is known as the "Queen of Reggaeton" in the traditionally male-dominated genre. She is also known "La Diva", "La Potra", "La Caballota", and "La Reina". She has become the "indisputable lead female voice of Latin urban and reggaeton music [and] an international icon for Latin music itself." She has been referred to as a "trailblazer" within the genre of Reggaetón. About.com named Queen one of the ten most influential women in Latin music in the category Reggaeton/Hip-Hop while selecting Sentimiento as Queen's best album. In 2007, a book about Queen's success and rise to success as a hip hop artist was released. In 2006, at the third annual Premios Juventud, Queen was presented with the Diva Award, honoring Queen for her career.

In 2013, Latina named Queen the best Latina rapper of all time. In 2016, the magazine listed Queen as one of the best reggaeton artists of all time. In 2017, Queen was nominated to be inducted into the Latin Songwriters Hall of Fame. She was inducted in 2019. In 2021, she was awarded the Urban Icon Award, in recognition of her musical achievements and inspiration on the Latin urban music genre, which was presented by the Latin Urban Music Conference in Colombia. In 2023, Queen was presented with the Musical Legacy Award at the 35th Lo Nuestro Awards, becoming the first female artist to be recognized with the award. This award is typically awarded to "artists whose musical legacy and contributions have largely influenced their respective genres." That same year, at Billboard Women in Music, Queen was recognized with the Icon Award, "given to accomplished women who have made historic contributions to the music industry." Later that year, Billboard ranked the 50 best Spanish-language rappers of all time, ranking Queen at number 8 on the list. Later that year, at the inaugural Rolling Stone en Español Awards, Queen was presented with the Legacy Award, recognizing her musical career.

=== Influenced artists ===
Reggaetón duo Jowell & Randy cite Queen as one of their musical influences. Queen is also a musical influence for Colombian singer Farina, Cuban-American singer La Goony Chonga, Dominican singer Natti Natasha, American singers Mariah Angeliq and Elena Rose, Colombian singers Karol G and Kali Uchis, Mexican singer Bellakath, Spanish singers Bad Gyal and Rosalía, Puerto Rican rappers Bad Bunny, Villano Antillano, and Young Miko and American rappers Bia and Cardi B.

== Philanthropy ==
Queen is a spokeswoman for the cancer charity Susan G. Komen for the Cure because her mother is a cancer survivor. Queen was involved in a charity marathon run in Puerto Rico called "Carrera por una Cura" ("Run for a Cure"). The marathon in San Juan, Puerto Rico, in which celebrities such as Puerto Rican actress Adamari López, and Puerto Rican singer Kany Garcia among others, ran for the prevention and cure of cancer. The marathon was dedicated to Adamari López, who suffered from breast cancer in 2007. In 2012, then-California governor Jerry Brown designated June 10 as "Ivy Queen day" in West Hollywood for her work advocating LGBT rights. In 2021, Queen performed at the official Latino inaugural celebration for US president Joe Biden.

== Other media ==
Queen has been writing her autobiography, Detrás Del Glamour (Behind Glamour), since late-2007. She said that she is writing it "because people see me but don't know what I've been through." She said the book will detail her life and the hardships she has lived through, including being homeless and not having food to eat while she pursued her musical career.

In December 2009, Ivy Queen launched a reggaeton doll. It was named "Queenie" and featured Queen's signature, long fingernails, and was manufactured by Global Trading Partners. The doll came with a recording device containing remixes of Queen's songs including "Menor Que Yo", "Que Lloren", and "Cuéntale". A case with accessories was also included. Queen made her acting debut in February 2012 in the Spanish-language production of Eve Ensler's play "The Vagina Monologues" staged in Orlando, Florida.

In August 2021, Queen narrated the Spotify Studios podcast Loud: The History of Reggaeton. The podcast explores the roots of reggaeton in Panama and Puerto Rico. It also discusses the genre's current global success.

=== In other music ===
In 2006, Puerto Rican singer Don Omar referenced Queen on the track "Jangueo" from his second studio album, King of Kings. Also in 2006, Dominican rapper Redimi2 mentioned Queen on "Declaró", featured on the reloaded edition of Omar's 2005 album Los Bandoleros. Later in 2009, Omar mentioned Queen on "Hasta Abajo", a promotional single for his 2010 album, Meet the Orphans. In 2016, Almighty referenced Queen on the remix of Benny Benni's "Power" which also featured Daddy Yankee, Ozuna, Anuel AA, Pusho, D Ozi, Gotay El Auténtico, Alexio and Kendo Kaponi. That same year, Tego Calderon referenced her on "Muy Pocas", a collaboration with Mackie. In 2017, American rapper Travis Scott referenced Queen on the remix of Puerto Rican singer Farruko's "Krippy Kush", which also features American rapper Nicki Minaj, Jamaican record producer Rvssian and Puerto Rican rapper Bad Bunny. In 2019, she was referenced by Joyce Santana on the remix to "Costear" performed by Almighty and Jhay Cortez which also featured Juanka, Bryant Myers, Rauw Alejandro, Justin Quiles, Lyanno, Eladio Carrión. In 2021, Puerto Rican rapper Kevvo mentioned Queen on "Dime Si Tu", which also featured Anonimus, Nicky Jam, Guaynaa, Arcángel and De La Ghetto. In 2022, Mariah Angeliq mentioned her on her single "Hey Siri". In 2023, Karol G referenced her on "Pero Tu" with Quevedo.

== Personal life ==
Ivy Queen was married to fellow reggaeton singer Omar Navarro, known by his stage name Gran Omar. They were divorced in 2005. Queen said she never found Omar in the act of adultery, and said that if she had, she would be in La Vega Alta—a women's prison in Puerto Rico. She also said she had not physically assaulted Omar's alleged mistress. She stated they had not lived together for two months, citing the "extensive travels of her husband and his workload of being a producer" as causes of the end of the nine-year marriage. A year after their separation, Omar said that Queen had tricked him, and that she owed him money from the sales and production of the album Cosa Nostra: Hip-Hop, which they presented together because of their obligations and contract with Univision. Jorge Guadalupe—Ivy Queen's manager—invited Omar to take legal action. Guadalupe called Omar "someone who misses the money and the high-life" he had while he was married to Queen. No legal action was taken, however. Omar appeared on television station Telefutura's program Escándalo TV and accused Queen of being unfaithful in their marriage. Queen however, denied the claims.

Queen was in a relationship with DJ Urba from mid-2006 to the end of 2007. In 2010, after Queen invited American actor Vin Diesel to attend 2010 Premios Juventud, it was rumored they were in a relationship together. She told Escándalo TV that there was no romance between them and that they were just good friends.

Ivy Queen has said she identifies with "Menor Que Yo"—a song where she was "talking about reality when she wrote it"—in her personal life. She said the song is about what happens to a lot of women. "I was talking about reality when I wrote it. About what happens to a lot of women. I think that there's no age requirement for two people who love each other. It's mostly about how people react when they see a mature woman who's with a younger man ... They think it's for money. They never think that there might be a connection, chemistry. She later said "Sentimientos" was the song that best represented her at that time, saying, " ... if you think you can only conquer me if you're famous, rich and have an expensive car, you're wrong, because I'm a woman who needs affection, someone to open the door for me, to bring me flowers and sing to me."

Queen does not drink alcohol. She said that although she quit high school after fourth year (eleventh grade), she graduated from the academy "Street" with a Bachelor of Life and honors. She said her vocabulary is "that of the street", and that if she could do something other than singing she would go to college.

Queen married Puerto Rican choreographer Xavier Sánchez in late 2012. She announced in June 2013 that the couple were expecting their first child. Before becoming naturally pregnant, Queen adopted two Latino children. She revealed her baby bump at the Calibash 2013 concert which was headlined by R&B singer Chris Brown. The baby was born in November 2013. In 2024, Queen announced that she had separated from her husband. In June 2016, Queen's father died of pulmonary cancer.

== Discography ==
=== Studio albums ===
- 1997: En Mi Imperio
- 1998: The Original Rude Girl
- 2003: Diva
- 2004: Real
- 2005: Flashback
- 2007: Sentimiento
- 2010: Drama Queen
- 2012: Musa
- 2015: Vendetta

== Filmography ==
=== Film and television ===
Year	Title	Role	Notes
2004	Ivy Queen: The Original Rude Girl	Herself	Documentary
2005	The Drop	Herself	TV series (episode 3)
2005	Pa'lante con Cristina	Herself	TV series
2005	Don Francisco Presenta	Herself	TV series (episode dated May 5, 2005)
2005	Flashback (CD/DVD)	Performer	Deluxe edition release
2005	The Best of Ivy Queen (CD/DVD)	Performer	First compilation album
2006	My Block: Puerto Rico	Herself	TV documentary
2007	2rslvj	Herself	TV series
2007	mun2 Vivo	Performer	Performed "Que Lloren"
2007	One Nation - Under Hip Hop	Herself	TV series
2007	Sentimiento (CD/DVD)	Performer	Platinum edition release
2008	Ivy Queen 2008 World Tour LIVE!	Performer	DVD movie
2008	2rslvj	Herself	TV series
2008	One Nation - Under Hip Hop	Herself	TV series
2008	mun2 Vivo	Performer	Performed "Dime"
2010	Drama Queen (CD/DVD)	Performer	Deluxe edition release
2012	Dub Latino	Herself	TV series (episode 2)
2012	mun2 Presents	Herself	TV series

=== Guest appearances ===
Year	Title	Role	Notes
2006	Scarface: The World Is Yours	Herself (Voice)	Video Game
2007	18 & Over	Herself	TV series
2008	mun2 Shuffle	Herself	TV series
2009	mun2 Shuffle	Herself	TV series
2009	The Look	Herself	TV series
2010	The Look	Herself	TV series
2010	mun2 Shuffle	Herself	TV series
2012	18 & Over	Herself	TV series

== See also ==
- List of Puerto Ricans
- History of women in Puerto Rico
