= Menor Que Yo =

Single by Ivy Queen

from the album Sentimiento
- Released: January 2008
- Recorded: 2006–2007
- Genre: Reggaetón
- Length: 3:15
- Label: Univision, Drama
- Songwriter: Martha Pesante
- Producers: Miguel Márquez "Escobar", Andrés Arroyo "Zoprano"

Ivy Queen singles chronology
"Sentimientos" (2007)	"Menor Que Yo" (2008)	"Dime" (2008)

"Menor Que Yo" (English: Younger Than Me) is a song by Puerto Rican reggaetón recording artist Ivy Queen, from the platinum edition of her sixth studio album, Sentimiento (2007). It was composed by Queen, produced by Escobar & Zoprano and released as the lead single from the album on March 8, 2008. Lyrically, it talks about how age shouldn't matter if you're in love with someone. The lyrics are about what happens when an older women falls in love with a younger man. The song is also considered the answer to Luny Tunes's smash-hit "Mayor Que Yo". The song's accompanying music video was filmed in Panama in January 2008. It was directed by Marlon Peña and produced by Alvis González. The song was able to peak at number twenty-five on the Billboard Latin Rhythm Airply chart.

== Background ==
Ivy Queen began working on her sixth studio album in 2006 after divorcing from her husband of nine years. Wanting to go in a different direction than her previous albums, she said she wanted to give a 180-degree turn to what people think of reggaetón. She explained "Many think reggaetón is just nice rhythms to dance to. And they forget there are song-writers and composers, who, like everyone else, also suffer and aspire in love". She wanted the album to be about that. She said "Love is what makes us write things, what keeps us alive. If we did not have love, we would have nothing". After the commercial success of the album, which was certified Platinum by the United States Recording Industry Association of America (RIAA), a platinum edition and substantial live album was distributed by Univision and Machete in late-2007 and 2008 respectively. Of the seven new tracks featured on the platinum edition was "Menor Que Yo" while a re-recordings of the Top 10 hit "Que Lloren" and "En Que Fallamos" also appear.

== Composition ==
Ivy Queen "Menor Que Yo" (2008)
An 18-second sample of the lead single "Menor Que Yo" which lyrically addresses love and age.

"Menor Que Yo" was composed by Queen herself. It was produced by Miguel Márquez and Andrés Arroyo, both known as Escobar and Zoprano. Ivy Queen said she wrote the song about an experience many women share, noting that many people who see an older woman with a younger man think his motivation is money.

"They never think that there might be a connection, chemistry," Ivy Queen said, while she herself thinks "there's no age requirement for two people who love each other." She said that she identifies with the song herself, having dated men 13 or 14 years younger than she.

== Music video ==
Ivy Queen in the music video for the song "Menor Que Yo". In this scene, Queen stops a Lamborghini with excessive speeds. Queen is later show in the music video driving said car inside of a mall.

The music video of "Menor Que Yo" was filmed in Panama in January 2008 under the direction of the Dominican-born Marlon Peña. Production was handled by renowned Panamanian producer Alvis González of Panafilms, while the cinematography was handled by Venezuelan Alvaro Rangel. Co-produced by Marlon Films and filmed in 35mm, the music video is a continuation of the previous music video by Ivy Queen "En Que Fallamos" which was filmed in Mexico City, Mexico. Filming began January 30, 2008 at 9am for the first scene and ended at 4pm. The first scene filmed, occurs in a mall, the Center MultiPlaza.

In this scene, Ivy Queen is driving a grey luxury car inside the mall, while customers and people visiting stare in amazement and wonder. Immediately after, at 4pm, the next scenes were filmed in Panama City-Casco Viejo, with representations of the popular barrios. Production of the video cost $60,000 and 80 extras were used excluding the hundreds of bystanders. In the beginning of the music video, Queen is on a police motorcycle when she stops a young man driving a car at excessive speeds.

== Charts ==
The song was released as the album's lead single via Airplay in January 2008. It was released digitally on March 8, 2008 by Machete Music. On the Billboard Latin Rhythm Airplay chart, the song debuted at #32 for the week of March 1, 2008 and peaked at #25 the next of March 8, 2008.

Chart (2008)	Peak Position
US Latin Rhythm Airplay (Billboard)	25
US Latin Rhythm Digital Songs (Billboard)	22
