= Ivy Queen Musa Sound Corporation =

Puerto Rican record label

- Parent company: Universal Music Latin Entertainment
- Founded: 2005
- Founder: Ivy Queen, José Guadalupe
- Distributor: Siente Music
- Genre: Reggaetón, bachata, hip hop, R&B, tropical, salsa
- Country of origin: United States
- Location: Miami, Florida; San Juan, Puerto Rico
- Official website: http://www.ivyqueendiva.com

Ivy Queen Musa Sound Corporation (formerly known as Filtro Musik and later Drama Records) is a multi-genre record label founded by Ivy Queen and José Guadalupe in San Juan, Puerto Rico in 2005 with the release of Ivy Queen's fifth studio album Flashback. The label also has an office in Miami, Florida. It serves the genres of reggaetón, bachata, hip hop, R&B, and various other styles of tropical and Latin music. The label has previously been distributed by Univision Records and Machete Music while currently being distributed by Siente Music since early 2012.

== History ==
=== Filtro Musik ===
In 2005, Ivy Queen partnered with co-founder of Perfect Image Records, José Guadalupe to form Filtro Musik. This stemmed from Guadalupe parting ways with the other co-founder of Perfect Image Anthony Pérez who in turn would launch his own label The Roof Records. Filtro Musik's concept initially stemmed from its name which means filter in English. "I've been in this industry 15 years, and we have the ability to filter and pick the best" said Guadalupe. Later that year, Univision Records signed the label to a licensing plan to promote Ivy Queen's fifth studio album Flashback (2005) to Latin and non-Latin buyers. This ensured that the album was positioned in Latin and mainstream accounts that would normally not carry Latin product. Following Queen's split from management and Jorge Guadalupe in 2006, Guadalupe separated into Filtro Music Group.

=== Drama Records ===
After the success of her 2007 effort Sentimiento, which spawned the Top 10 hit "Que Lloren" and was later certified Platinum by the United States Recording Industry Association of America (RIAA), a substantial live album, Ivy Queen 2008 World Tour LIVE! was distributed by Machete in 2008. This would lead up to Queen signing with the label in April 2010 as it celebrated its fifth anniversary. The signing, described as a 360 deal, includes profit sharing in tours, sponsorships and merchandising. Ivy Queen was previously signed to a distribution deal with Univision Records, which in turn was acquired by Machete's parent company Universal Music Latin Entertainment in 2008. The president of Universal Music Latino and Machete, Walter Kolm, commented in a press release "It's a privilege to have Ivy Queen a part of our artistic roster. Ivy is an extraordinary woman with incomparable talent, and she's number one in her genre. We're happy to be able to work with her on her new album as well as future projects". "I'm very proud to be a part of Machete Music. They are a young, vibrant company that has created a name for itself in Latin music in the United States and the world. They are a strong and important company that has been recognized for nurturing their artists’ creative talents," said Ivy Queen, regarding the partnership.

=== Ivy Queen Musa Sound ===
Shortly, however, Queen released a new single, "Peligro De Extinción" in 2012 under Siente Music, a subdivision of Universal Music Latin Entertainment, sister labels with Machete. This in turn led to Queen launching Ivy Queen Musa Sound, a new record label, starting with the release of the single, and then her eight studio album effort, Musa on August 21, 2012. Queen then further in her career releasing a Christmas song, "Vamos a Celebrar" under Ivy Queen Musa Sound and Venevision, also under the parent label Universal Music Latin Entertainment.

== Discography ==
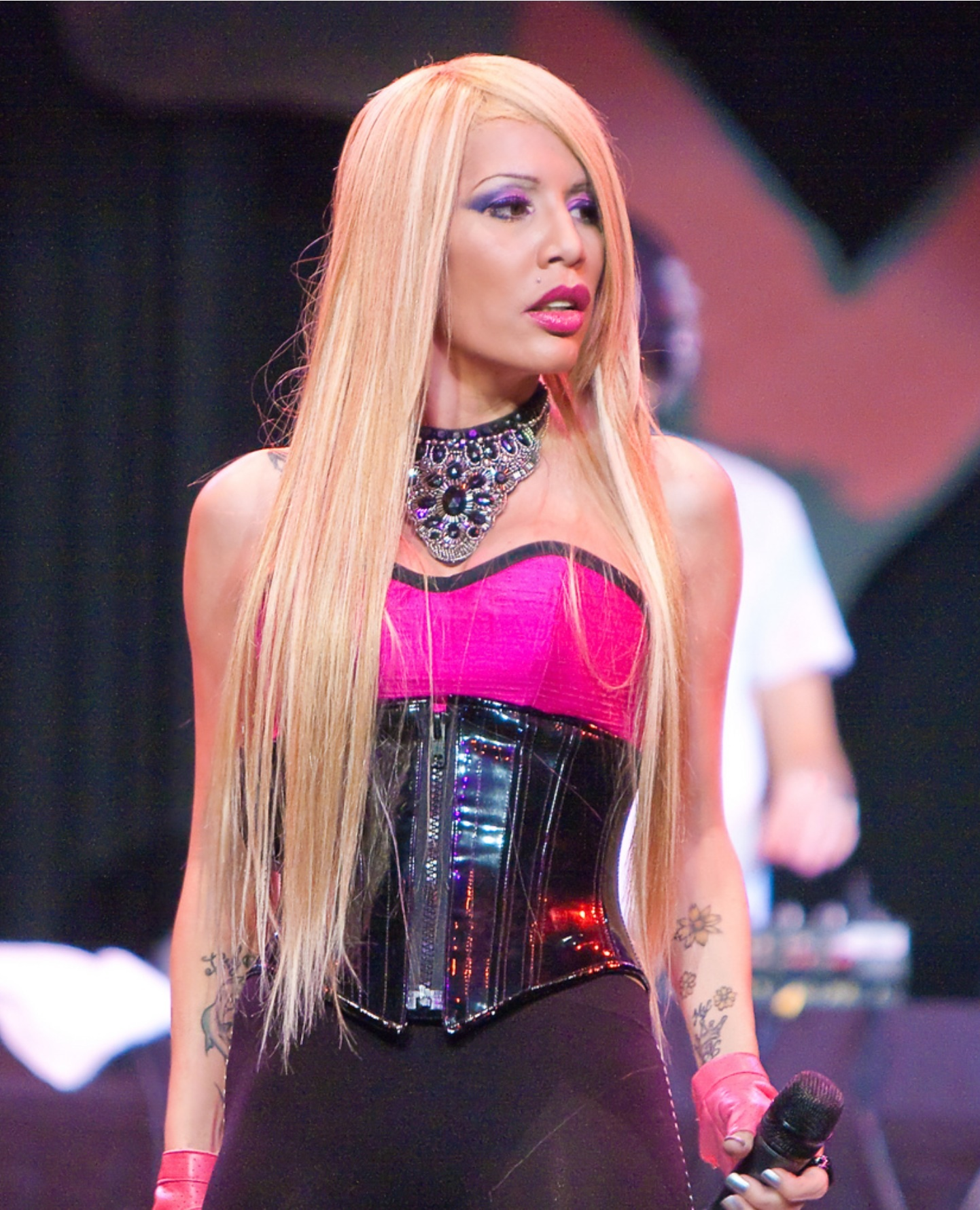
Ivy Queen in 2010.

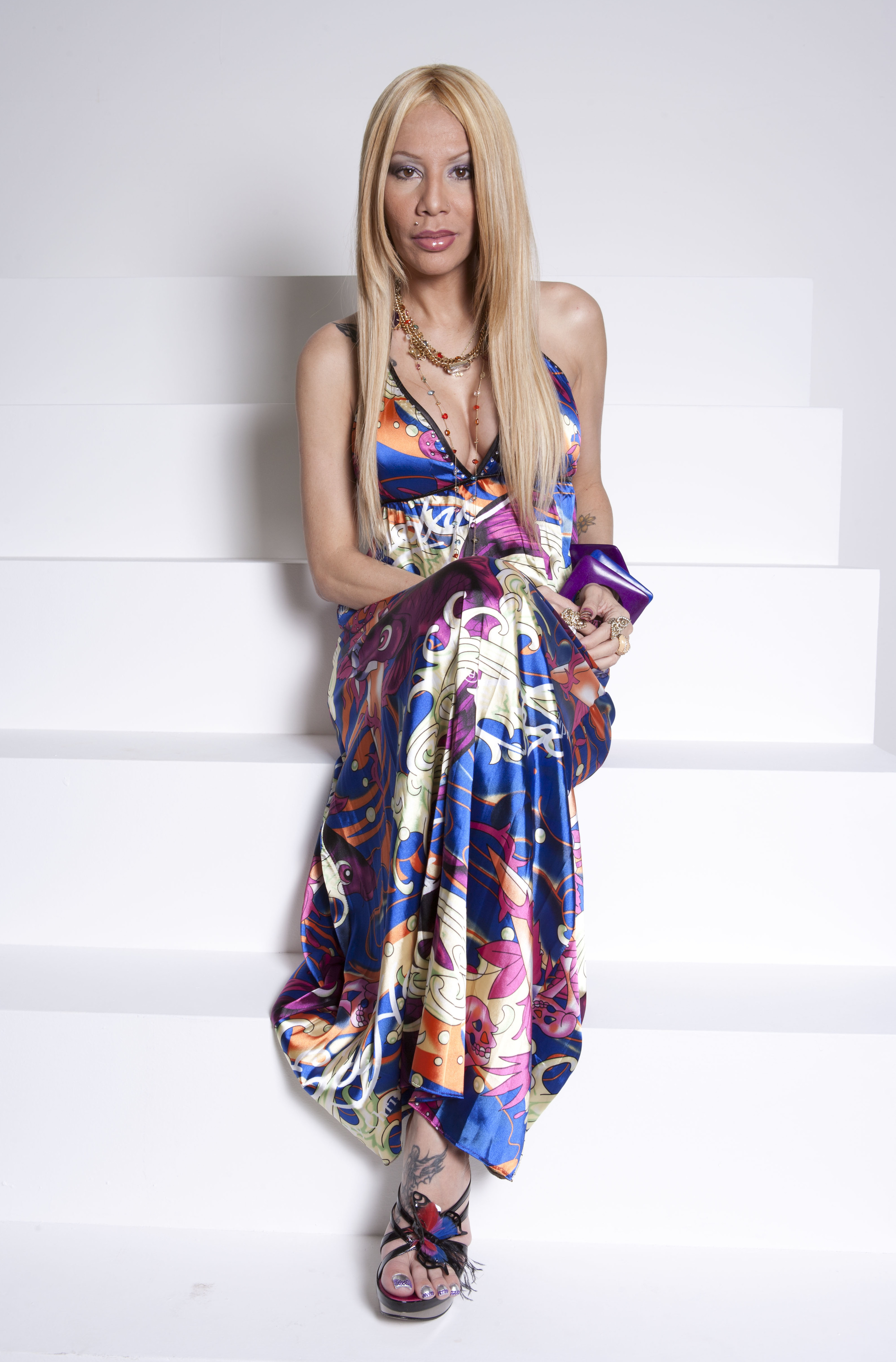
Ivy Queen in 2010.

=== Studio albums ===
2005

- Ivy Queen — Flashback
- Big Boy — El Comeback

2006

- Ivy Queen and Gran Omar — Cosa Nostra: Hip-Hop
- Big Boy — Reloaded Version 2.5

2007

- Big Boy — Hail The Big Boy
- Mickey Perfecto — Cuando El Silencio Hace Ruido
- Ivy Queen — Real (Reissue)
- Ivy Queen — Sentimiento
- Ivy Queen — Sentimiento: Platinum Edition

2008

- Mickey Perfecto — En Cuerpo y Alma
- Ivy Queen — Ivy Queen 2008 World Tour LIVE!

2010

- Ivy Queen — Drama Queen

2012

- Ivy Queen — Musa

2016

- Ivy Queen — Vendetta

=== Singles ===
2005

- Ivy Queen — "Cuéntale"
- Ivy Queen — "Libertad"
- Ivy Queen — "Te He Querido, Te He Llorado"

2006

- Ivy Queen — "No Hacen Na"
- Gran Omar featuring Haze and Moreno — "Paquetes"

2007

- Divino — "Pobre Corazón"
- Ivy Queen — "Que Lloren"
- Ivy Queen — "En Que Fallamos"
- Ivy Queen — "Sentimientos"

2008

- Ivy Queen — "Menor Que Yo"
- Ivy Queen — "Dime Si Recuerdas
- Ivy Queen — "Dime"

2009

- Víctoria Sanabría featuring Ivy Queen — "No Te Quiero"

2010

- Ivy Queen — "La Vida Es Así
- Ivy Queen — "Amor Puro"

2011

- Ivy Queen — "La Playa"
- Víctoria Sanabría — "Soy Mujer"

2012

- Ivy Queen — "Peligro de Extinción"
- Ivy Queen featuring Víctoria Sanabría — "Vamos A Celebrar"

2013

- Ivy Queen − "Cupido"

2014

- Ivy Queen − "Cuando Las Mujeres"
- Ivy Queen − "No Hay"
- Ivy Queen − "Soy Libre"
- Ivy Queen featuring Ñengo Flow − "Vamos A Guerrear"
- Ivy Queen featuring Jowell & Randy − "Nací Para Amarte"
- Ivy Queen − "Vendetta"

2016

- Ivy Queen − "Que Se Jodan"

=== Other songs ===
2010

- Ivy Queen featuring Wisin & Yandel — "Acércate"

== Artist ==
- Ivy Queen
- Víctoria Sanabría

== Affiliated Artist ==
- Daddy Yankee
- Wisin & Yandel
- Don Omar
- De la Ghetto
- Arcángel
- Tito El Bambino

== Former Artist ==
- Big Boy
- Divino
- Gran Omar
- Mickey Perfecto
- Tribales

== DJs/Producers ==
- Keko Musik

== Affiliated DJ/Producers ==
- DJ Nelson
- Luny Tunes
- Noriega
- Tainy
- Predikador

== Former DJs/Producers ==
- Monserrate & DJ Urba
- Escobar & Zoprano
- Rafi Mercenario

== Associated labels ==
- WY Records
- White Lion Records
- El Cartel Records
- Venevision
