= Dime (Ivy Queen song) =

Song by Ivy Queen

Single by Ivy Queen

from the album Ivy Queen 2008 World Tour LIVE!
- Released: August 2008
- Recorded: 2008
- Genre: Reggaeton, bachata
- Length: 3:41 (Album Version); 3:42 (Bachata Version)
- Label: Machete, Drama
- Songwriters: Martha Pesante, Alex Sosa, Urbani Cedeno
- Producer: Monserrate & DJ Urba

Ivy Queen singles chronology
"Menor Que Yo" (2008)	"Dime" (2008)	"La Vida Es Así" (2010)

Alternate cover art
- Digital cover art

Audio sample
- A 21 second sample of the bachata version of "Dime," which was the version of the song that was sampled to Tropical music radio stations.: file; help

"Dime" (Spanish pronunciation: [ˈdime], "Tell Me") is a song by Puerto Rican reggaetón recording artist Ivy Queen, from her first live album, Ivy Queen 2008 World Tour LIVE! (2008). It was composed by Queen, with the help of Alex Monserrate Sosa and Urbani Mota Cedeno, who produced the song under their stage name Monserrate & DJ Urba. It was released as the lead single off the album in August 2008. The bachata version was serviced to radio while the Album version appears as the opening track. The album version is a mixture of reggaetón and bachata known as bachaton or bachateo.

The song's accompanying music video was directed by Marlon Peña and filmed in Miami, Florida on August 25, 2008. This would be the last single released by Queen until 2010 with "La Vida Es Así". The song was later included on the deluxe edition of Ivy Queen's seventh studio album Drama Queen (2010). The song became a commercial success within the Latin market reaching the Top 10 of various Latin music charts in the United States. It was fourteenth and tenth best selling Latin Rhythm single of 2008 and 2009 respectively.

== Background ==
After the success of her 2007 effort Sentimiento, which would be certified Platinum by the United States Recording Industry Association of America (RIAA), Ivy Queen embarked on recording a live album at the José Miguel Agrelot Coliseum, the biggest indoor arena dedicated to entertainment in Puerto Rico. The live album, later known as Ivy Queen 2008 World Tour LIVE!, feature performances of songs from previously released albums including Diva (2003), Real (2004), Flashback (2005) and Sentimiento. "Dime" was featured on the album as the intro and closing tracks and was not performed on the setlist of the tour; According to Queen, she and her management decided to include it on the album as a "gift".

== Musical composition ==
"Dime" was written by Ivy Queen herself. It was produced by the Puerto Rican reggaetón production duo Monserrate & DJ Urba who also co-wrote the song. The album version is a blend of reggaetón and bachata known as bachaton or bachateo, a musical movement in the Dominican Republic and Puerto Rico which combines bachata melodies and reggaeton style beats, lyrics, rapping, and disc jockeying. Ivy Queen described the song as being "a sentimiental subject where we fused bachata and urban rhythms. While reviewing the song "Peligro de Extinción", Jonathan Bogart called "Dime" the "prettiest single" Ivy Queen had ever released.

== Release and promotion ==
"Dime" was released in August 2008 as the lead single off the album. A bachata version was also recorded and included on the album. Both versions of the song were serviced to Latin radio. The song was featured on the deluxe edition of Queen's seventh studio album, Drama Queen (2010).

== Chart performance ==
On the Billboard Hot Latin Songs chart, the song debuted at number forty-three on the week of September 20, 2008 and peaked at number eight on the week of December 6, 2008. On the Billboard Latin Pop Airplay chart, the song debuted at number thirty-eight on the week of November 15, 2008 and peaked at number thirty-three for the week of December 13, 2008. On the Billboard Latin Tropical Airplay chart, the song debuted at number thirty-three on the week of October 4, 2008 and peaked at number four, moving eight positions from number twelve, the week prior, on the week of December 6, 2008. Songs in which withheld "Dime" from the number-one position were "No Me Doy Por Vencido" by Luis Fonsi, "Amor Inmortal" by Chayanne and "Como Duele" by Ricardo Arjona respectively. On the Billboard Latin Rhythm Airplay chart, the song debuted at number twenty-two on the week of August 30, 2008. It reached number one for the week of October 11, 2008 becoming her first number-one single, replacing "Síguelo" by Wisin & Yandel and was later succeeded by R.K.M & Ken-Y for "Te Regalo Amores" eight weeks later. It remained at the number two spot for four weeks before again regaining the number one spot for the week of December 20, 2008. Queen became the first female to top the chart.

== Track listing ==
- CD Single

No.	Title	Writer(s)	Producer(s)	Length
1.	"Dime" (Album Version)	Martha Pesante	Monserrate & DJ Urba	3:41
2.	"Dime" (Bachata Version)	Pesante	Monserrate & DJ Urba	3:42
3.	"Dime" (Album Version Official Remix featuring Jadiel)	Pesante	Monserrate & DJ Urba	3:59
4.	"Dime" (Bachata Version Official Remix featuring Jadiel)	Pesante	Monserrate & DJ Urba	4:00
5.	"Dime" (Balada Version Official Remix featuring Jadiel)	Pesante	Monserrate & DJ Urba, Luny Tunes, Noriega	4:46
6.	"Dime" (Merengue Version)	Pesante	Eliel	4:12
Total length:				23:20

== Music video ==
Ivy Queen in the music video for "Dime" filmed at the Museum of Trains in Miami, Florida. Back-up dancers perform bachata.

The music video for "Dime" was filmed at the Museum of Trains in Miami, Florida on August 25, 2008. It was directed by Marlon Peña who has also directed videos for "Te He Querido, Te He Llorado" and "Que Lloren". Filming began at 6:00 am and was finalized by 11:00 pm. In the music video, Queen is dressed up as Marilyn Monroe. The music video was based highly on the 1970s and featured a retro and vintage look. As of February 2018, "Dime", (which was posted on December 15, 2009, a year after it was filmed) has over thirty-seven million views on video-sharing website YouTube.

The music video begins with Ivy Queen driving a black beamer in a train station. Queen is then seen standing outside of her car as the song begins. Queen is then seen among dancers that perform bachata in the train station. She then rides on the train in the area between to train cars. Passengers can then be seen arriving and obtaining tickets at a ticket booth. Queen's lover in the music video gets a ticket as well. He sits on a bench appearing to be waiting for someone, glancing at his watch. He gets up and leaves for the train. Back up dancers continue to perform as Queen sings on a microphone as bystanders walk past them. Before entering the train, her lover looks around a last time handing the attendant his ticket. Queen then walks around looking her him bumping into others. She consults the attendant who directs her in the wrong direction, however she enters the train anyway failing to give him her ticket. Queen moves between train cars as she looks desperately for her lover. As the song ends, he pulls out a picture of Queen. He then goes to restroom as Queen sits down a seat over. He returns and they sit back to back unaware of the circumstances.

== Accolades ==
=== Billboard Latin Music Awards ===
The Billboard Latin Music Awards are awarded annually by Billboard magazine in the United States. At the 2009 Latin Billboard Music Awards, "Dime" was awarded Hot Latin Song of the Year, Female and Tropical Airplay Song of the Year, Female. It was also nominated for Latin Rhythm Airplay Song of the Year, Solo, which was won by Flex and "Te Quiero". Queen was not present at the award ceremony to receive her awards as she was not notified that she was going to win. This led to confusion on both parts as to why Queen was not present to receive the two accolades.

Year	Nominee / work	Award	Result
2009	"Dime"	Hot Latin Song of the Year, Female	Won
2009	"Dime"	Tropical Airplay Track of the Year, Female	Won
2009	"Dime"	Latin Rhythm Airplay Track of the Year, Solo	Nominated

=== American Society of Composers, Authors and Publishers Awards ===
The ASCAP Awards are awarded annually by the American Society of Composers, Authors and Publishers in the United States. "Dime" was awarded Urban Song of the Year at the 17th Annual ASCAP Latin Music Awards.

Year	Nominee / work	Award	Result
2009	"Dime"	Urban Song of the Year	Won

=== Broadcast Music, Inc. Awards ===
Broadcast Music, Inc. (BMI) annually hosts award shows that honor the songwriters, composers and music publishers of the year's most-performed songs in the BMI catalog. At the 2010, Broadcast Music, Inc. (BMI) Awards, the song was awarded Award-Winning Song.

Year	Nominee / work	Award	Result
2010	"Dime"	Award-Winning Songs	Won

== Charts ==
=== Weekly charts ===
Chart (2008)	Peak Position
US Latin Songs (Billboard)	8
US Latin Recurrent Airplay (Billboard)	9
US Latin Pop Airplay (Billboard)	33
US Latin Tropical Airplay (Billboard)	4
US Latin Rhythm Airplay (Billboard)	1
US Latin Rhythm Digital Songs (Billboard)	1

=== Year-end charts ===
Chart (2008)	Position
US Latin Songs (Billboard)	82
US Latin Rhythm Airplay (Billboard)	14
Chart (2009)	Position
US Latin Rhythm Airplay (Billboard)	10

=== Decade-end charts ===
Chart (2000s)	Position
US Latin Rhythm Airplay (Billboard)	???

== See also ==
- List of Billboard Latin Rhythm Airplay number ones of 2008
