= Sentimientos (song) =

Single by Ivy Queen

from the album Sentimiento
- Released: April 2007
- Recorded: 2006–2007; Marroneo Studios (Bayamón, Puerto Rico)
- Genre: Reggaetón, bachata
- Length: 2:51
- Label: Univision, Drama
- Songwriter: Martha Pesante
- Producer: Rafi Mercenario

Ivy Queen singles chronology
"En Que Fallamos" (2007)	"Sentimientos" (2007)	"Menor Que Yo" (2008)

"Sentimientos" (English: Feelings) is a song by Puerto Rican reggaetón recording artist Ivy Queen, from her sixth studio album, Sentimiento (2007). It was composed by Queen, produced by Rafi Mercenario and released as the third single from the album in April 2007. The song is a mixture of reggaetón and bachata known as bachaton or bachateo. Lyrically, it describes how doing things that are nice or romantic "are more important than material things." The song garnered mainly positive reviews from critics, Scott Mahia of About.com gave it a 4 out of 5 stars and praised the dance mixes. The song managed to on the Billboard Latin Rhythm Songs and Billboard Dance Club Play Songs chart at number 22 and 44 respectively. Ivy Queen also performed the song as a part of the set of her 2008 World Tour which was held from the José Miguel Agrelot Coliseum known as the Coliseum of Puerto Rico in San Juan, Puerto Rico. A remix version with Jowell & Randy was planned but never fulfilled.

== Background ==
Following the success of Queen's fifth studio album in 2005 in the Latin market, she began working on her sixth studio album in 2006. She wanted to create a new album with more slower and romantic reggaetón. This stemmed from Queen divorcing her husband of nine years and releasing all of her anger on Flashback. Not wanting to go into detail, she "acknowledged the songs were just one way she dealt with the end of an 11-year relationship". On the album, as a part of her evolution in reggaetón, she includes "solo turns", instead of duets by guest artist. Of the solo tracks on the album is "Pobre Corazón" by Divino while others include "Manaña Al Despertar" by Baby Rasta and Noriega where the artist performed songs without vocals by Ivy Queen. She said she wanted to give a 180-degree turn to what people think of reggaetón. She explained "Many think reggaetón is just nice rhythms to dance to. And they forget there are song-writers and composers, who, like everyone else, also suffer and aspire in love". She wanted the album to be about that. She said "Love is what makes us write things, what keeps us alive. If we did not have love, we would have nothing".

== Musical composition ==
Ivy Queen "Sentimientos" (2007)
A 24 second sample of "Sentimientos" featuring a bachaton/bachateo beat, that combines the sounds of reggaetón and bachata.

"Sentimientos", the title track, was written by Ivy Queen herself. The song was recorded at Marroneo Studios in Bayamón, Puerto Rico along with "Indecisiones" and "En Que Fallamos" from the album. It was produced by the Puerto Rican reggaetón producer and long time collaborator Rafi Mercenario, who also has produced some of her biggest hits including "Cuéntale" and "Libertad" among others. The song is a blend of reggaetón and bachata music known as bachaton or bachateo, a musical movement in the Dominican Republic and Puerto Rico which combines bachata melodies and reggaeton style beats, lyrics, rapping, and disc jockeying. It features minor key tonality, mixed acoustic and electric instrumentation, bowed strings, a string ensemble, and ambient synthesizers. Ivy Queen indicated that the song emphasized human connection over material things, stating that "What I wanted to say in the song is that material things have never been important to me.... I look for genuine feelings, honesty, the things that come from the heart, because the material things I can get." In another interview, she identified the song as the one that best represented her at that time, explaining, "if you think you can only conquer me if you're famous, rich and have an expensive car, you're wrong, because I'm a woman who needs affection, someone to open the door for me, to bring me flowers and sing to me." After the commercial success of the album, which was certified Platinum by the United States Recording Industry Association of America (RIAA), a platinum edition and substantial live album was distributed by Univision and Machete in late-2007 and 2008 respectively. The platinum edition of the album features remixes and bonus tracks to the original version of the album. Randy, who Queen is good friends with, of the duo Jowell & Randy is credited as being featured on the track that has a duration of two minutes and 49 second, three seconds less than the original. However, Randy is not heard on the song.

== Chart performance ==
"Sentimientos" was released in April 2007 as the third single from the album by Univision Records preceded by "Que Lloren and En Que Fallamos" and followed by "Dime Si Recuerdas" and "Menor Que Yo". On the Billboard Latin Rhythm Airplay chart, the song debuted at #36 for the week of October 13, 2007. The next week of October 20, 2007 it peaked at #22. The following week it fell two positions landing on #24. As airplay decreased, the song fell again to #31 two weeks later. The following week it rose ten positions to #22. In its last week on the chart, (November 24, 2007), it fell to #33. On the Billboard Dance Club Play Songs chart, the song debuted at #48 for the week of November 17, 2007. The following week it rose two positions to #46. In its third week it rose two more positions to #44.

== Critical reception ==
Scott Mahia of About.com gave the song a 4 out of 5 stars. He complimented the dance mixes by Georgie Porgie and Norty Cotto favoring the ones done by Porgie, later claiming Ivy Queen to be the female equivalent to Daddy Yankee. Regarding the dance remixes done by Porgie, Mahia noticed that he "kept the Latin reggaetón feel by incorporating heavy piano riffs and precussion", later claiming them to be "definite club friendly mixes". For the remixes done by Norty Cotto, Mahia noted that they were more radio-friendly and how the remixes sample "Girl You Know It's True" by Milli Vanilli and "Murder She Wrote" by Chaka Demus & Pliers complimenting how the mixes were blended which in turn gave the mixes "an interesting depth". He later claimed Queen to be the female equivalent to Daddy Yankee while stating "if you like the Latin/Reggaeton sound, then you should have Ivy Queen in your collection".

== Track listing ==
- CD Single

No.	Title	Writer(s)	Producer(s)	Length
1.	"Sentimientos" (Album Version)	Martha Ivelisse Pesante	Rafi Mercenario	2:51
2.	"Sentimientos" (Georgie's House Vocal Mix)	Pesante	Georgie Porgie	7:34
3.	"Sentimientos" (Georgie's House Dub Mix)	Pesante	Georgie Porgie	7:31
4.	"Sentimientos" (Georgie's Radio Mix)	Pesante	Georgie Porgie	2:48
5.	"Sentimientos" (Georgie's House Instrumental Mix)	Pesante	Georgie Porgie	7:30
6.	"Sentimientos" (Norty's Big Bounce Latin Mix)	Pesante	Norty Cotto	3:07
7.	"Sentimientos" (Norty's Drum Dub Latin Mix)	Pesante	Norty Cotto	3:05
8.	"Sentimientos" (Norty's Latin Instrumental Mix)	Pesante	Norty Cotto	3:05
Total length:				37:31

=== Notes ===
- Tracks 6–8: Samples "Girl You Know It's True" by Milli Vanilli and "Murder She Wrote" Chaka Demus & Pliers

== Credits and personnel ==
- Album Version
  - Sentimientos 2:51 — (IQ Publishing/BMI)
  - Interpreter/Composer: Ivy Queen
  - Executive Production: Ivy Queen, Pro Motion (Remixes)
  - Musical Production: Rafi Mercenario
  - Mastering: Esteban Piñero
  - Arranging: Esteban Piñero
  - Additional Keyboards: James Edwards III (Remixes)
  - Additional Production: B.B. Keys (Remixes)
  - Recording: Marroneo Studios in Bayamón, Puerto Rico
  - Art Direction: Holly Chen
  - Costume: Manuel Bou by Angel López
  - Photography: Garg Bonderenko
  - Makeup and Hair: Ariel Hernández
  - Nail Design: Maria Laureano
- Live Version
  - Mixing Engineer: Arnaldo Santo "Naldo" & Miguel Pequero
  - Musical Director: Miguel Márquez "Escobar"
  - Bass: José Aponte
  - Guitar: Juan C. Rodríguez
  - Keyboards: Andres Arroyo "Zoprano"
  - Drums: Antonio Alonso "Papito"
  - Percussion: Omar Soto "Pooh"
  - Güira: Lionel Rodríguez "Leo"
  - Chorus 1: Julio Cartagena "Corbata"
  - Chorus 2: Zulma Oviedo
  - Chorus 3: Orlando Rosario "Orlandito"
  - DJ: David Montañez "DJ Davey"
  - Sound: Comco Audio
  - Sound Engineer Monitors: Ryan Vargas
  - Sound Engineer FOH: Manuel Comulada

== Charts ==
Chart (2007)	Peak Position
US Hot Dance Club Play Songs (Billboard)	44
US Latin Rhythm Airplay (Billboard)	22
US Latin Rhythm Digital Songs (Billboard)	20
