= Sentimiento (album) =

Studio album by Ivy Queen
- Released: March 27, 2007
- Recorded: 2006 in Puerto Rico
- Genres: Reggaetón; bolero; salsa
- Length: 48:35
- Language: Spanish
- Labels: Univision; Drama
- Producers: Andres "Zoprano" Arroyo; Norty Cotto; Isidro Infante; Miguel "Escobar" Marquez; Rafi Mercenario; Monserrate & DJ Urba; Naldo; Noriega; Mickey Perfecto; Marcos Sanchez; Stani; Luny Tunes; Yotuel Romero

Ivy Queen chronology
Flashback (2005)	Sentimiento (2007)	Drama Queen (2010)

Singles from Sentimiento
- 1. "Que Lloren" Released: January 2007; 2. "En Que Fallamos" Released: February 2007; 3. "Sentimientos" Released: April 2007; 4. "Dime Si Recuerdas" Released: November 2007; 5. "Menor Que Yo" Released: January 2008

Sentimiento (English: Feeling) is the sixth studio album by Puerto Rican recording artist Ivy Queen. It was released on March 27, 2007, by Univision Records. The album features production collaborations with several Puerto Rican music producers including Monserrate & DJ Urba, Noriega, and Luny Tunes. It also features vocal collaborations with Don Omar, Arcángel, Tito "El Bambino", Ken-Y, Randy and Naldo. The album includes solo performances by Baby Rasta, Divino, Mikey Perfecto, Naldo and Noriega. Musically, the album alternates between reggaetón, bolero, and salsa. The move in musical composition from reggaetón and hip hop is credited to Queen's evolution as a musical artist.

Sentimiento spawned four singles: "Que Lloren", "En Que Fallamos", "Sentimientos" and "Menor Que Yo", along with one promotional single, "Dime Si Recuerdas". The lead single "Que Lloren" was the best performing, reaching number ten on the Billboard Latin Songs chart, number four on the Billboard Tropical Songs chart, and number two on the Billboard Latin Rhythm Songs chart. Commercially, the album was a success. It debuted at number 105 on the Billboard 200, selling nine thousand copies in its first week. The album managed two weeks at number twenty-four on the Billboard Rap Albums chart as well. It also debuted at number four on the Billboard Top Latin Albums chart and number one on the Billboard Latin Rhythm Albums chart.

The album was nominated for "Best Urban Music Album at the Latin Grammy Awards of 2007. It received a nomination for "Reggaetón Album of the Year" at the 2008 Latin Billboard Music Awards, where "Que Lloren" also received a nomination for "Latin Dance Club Play Track of the Year". At the Premio Lo Nuestro Awards of 2008, Sentimiento was awarded "Urban Album of the Year". Ivy Queen received a Latin gold and platinum certification in the United States for a Sentimiento, signifying sales of over 100,000 copies. As of 2010, the album has sold over 154,000 copies in the United States.

== Background ==
In June 2005, Ivy Queen partnered with co-founder of Perfect Image Records, José Guadalupe to form Filtro Musik. This stemmed from Guadalupe parting ways with the other co-founder of Perfect Image, Anthony Pérez who in turn would launch his own label The Roof Records. Filtro Musik's concept initially stemmed from its name which means "filter" in English. Guadalupe explained the title, saying "I've been in this industry for 15 years now, and we have the ability to filter and pick the best". In the coming year, Univision Music Group signed the label to a licensing plan.

Ivy Queen was previously married to fellow reggaetón artist Omar Navarro, known by his stage name Gran Omar. They were divorced in 2005 shortly before the release of Flashback, which influenced the composition of the Sentimiento, which began soon after in late 2006. Following this, Cosa Nostra: Hip Hop (2006), a compilation album presented by Queen and Omar was released. Its lead single, "No Hacen Na" was performed by Queen and was released in July 2006. It peaked at number twenty-five on the Billboard Latin Rhythm Songs chart and number thirty on the Billboard Tropical Songs chart.

However, Navarro later stated that Queen had tricked him, and that she owed him money from the sales and production of the album . No legal action was taken, however. Navarro was invited by Jorge Guadalupe, Ivy Queen's manager to take legal action, as he has all the papers stating that there was no deception with the album. Guadalupe called Navarro "someone who misses the money and the high-life" he had while he was married to Queen. Navarro would also go on national television and accuse Queen of being unfaithful in their relationship on the television program Escándalo TV (Telefutura). He would also mention the accusations that Queen owed him money from the album as well on the program.

In early 2007, it was announced the Queen had signed an exclusive contract to release Sentimiento. "I’m super-proud to be a part of Univision Music Group. I’ve always felt like I was part of a family with them, because they handled my last album and they did an excellent job. They are a strong and important company who always respects its artists." she said. The feeling was mutual with Jose Behar, the President of Univision Music Group who said "it’s a privilege to have Ivy Queen be a part of our artistic talent. Ivy is a woman with incomparable talent, and she’s number one in her genre. We’re happy to be able to work with her on her new album and future projects as well."

== Recording and production ==
Following the release of Cosa Nostra: Hip Hop, Queen wanted to release a concept album which would have had Queen performing duets with female singers from different genres, entitled Drama Queen. However, this was changed and she began working on Sentimiento instead. Recording for Sentimiento took place at AQ-30 Studios in San Juan, Jesus In 2in Studios, Los Yedais Recording Studio, Mas Flow Studios in San Juan, Marroneo Studios in Bayamón, Sangre Nueva Studios in Carolina and Stani Recording Studio, all located in Puerto Rico.

Recording sessions for Sentimiento began in 2006, with Queen working day and night, according to Guadalupe. Production was divided among several Puerto Rican music producers including Monserrate & DJ Urba, Miguel "Escobar" Marquez, Andres "Zoprano" Arroyo, Isidro Infante, Mickey Perfecto, Stani, Marcos Sanchez, Rafy Mercenario, Noriega and Luny Tunes. Each track has a different producer. Collaborations include Don Omar on "Robarte Un Beso", Ken-Y on the remix of "En Que Fallamos" and Naldo, Arcángel & Tito "El Bambino" on the remix of "Que Lloren".

== Music and lyrics ==
Ivy Queen "Que Quieres Tú De Mí" (2007)
A 14 second sample of Queen's rendition of "Que Quieres Tú De Mí".

While recording and producing the album, Queen incorporated different musical instruments such as "strings, piano, acoustic ballads and romantic tunes". This was an attempt to prove that reggaetón is not just its basic rhythm. She explained "many think reggaetón is just nice rhythms to dance to. And they forget there are song-writers and composers, who, like everyone else, also suffer and aspire in love". She said "Love is what makes us write things, what keeps us alive. If we did not have love, we would have nothing". She acknowledged that the songs on the album were one way she dealt with the end of her eleven-year marriage. The lyrics focus on the experiences she has endured within the couple of years since the release of her previous studio album, which according to Queen were a "tough situation in her personal life". The ballads of the album "cover familiar topics — devotion, heartbreak, hope and reconciliation". Musically, the album alternates between reggaetón, bolero, and salsa.

Divino "Pobre Corazón" (2007)
A 24 second sample of "Pobre Corazón" performed by Divino.

"Qué Quieres Tú De Mí" is an acoustic guitar ballad which Queen covered in a minor-key; it features traditional Afro-Latin American influences. It was originally written in 1964 by Brazilian composers Evaldo Gouveia and Jair Amorim as "Que Queres Tu De Mim" for Brazilian singer Altemar Dutra. "Que Lloren" features minor key tonality, bowed strings, a string ensemble and elements of techno music. The song's lyrics show a woman's view of romance and belittles the stereotype that men shouldn't show emotions. The mid-tempo "Sentimientos", is a blend of reggaetón and bachata music known as bachaton or bachateo, a musical movement in the Dominican Republic and Puerto Rico which combines bachata melodies and reggaeton style beats, lyrics, rapping, and disc jockeying. It features minor key tonality, mixed acoustic and electric instrumentation, bowed strings, a string ensemble, and ambient synthesizers. Ivy Queen indicated that the song emphasized human connection over material things, stating that "What I wanted to say in the song is that material things have never been important to me.... I look for genuine feelings, honesty, the things that come from the heart, because the material things I can get." In another interview, she identified the song as the one that best represented her at that time, explaining, "if you think you can only conquer me if you're famous, rich and have an expensive car, you're wrong, because I'm a woman who needs affection, someone to open the door for me, to bring me flowers and sing to me."

Ivy Queen "Indecisiones" (2007)
An 18 second sample of "Indecisiones" set to similar instrumentation of the previous reggaetón tracks.

"Pobre Corazón" features male lead vocals interpreted by Divino. Set in a minor key, the ballad includes an ensemble with bowed strings, a piano and ambient synthesizers. The song's lyrics are romantic. Incorporating techno synths and minor key tonality, "En Que Fallamos" follows. Lyrically, Ivy Queen described the song as being what happened to her when a relationship ended. She said it is very "honest and straightforward" explaining that she wanted to "show people the stormy times that I lived." Ivy Queen worked with Puerto Rican singer Ken-Y, one half of the reggaeton duo R.K.M & Ken-Y on the "romantic" remix to the song. "Reza Por Mi" also features techo synths along with a bowed string ensemble. The song's contains catchy romantic lyrical hooks. The acoustic ballad "Cuando Comprendas" is performed by Mickey Perfecto. The song's romantic story-telling lyrics accompany a piano. "Yo Te Rescate" is accompanied by an accordion, or bandoneon, playing. The song features romantic lyrics performed by Queen. "Indecisiones" follows similar instrumentation as the previous reggaetón tracks featuring techno synths and a bowed string ensemble. Naldo performs "Llego El Domingo", a piano lead acoustic ballad. "Cuando No Me Tengas" lyrically "describes the aftermath of a break-up". The song combines bowed strings with elements of techno music.

Ivy Queen "Si Eres Tu" (2007)
A 26 second sample of the salsa track "Si Eres Tú" produced by Isidro Infante.

The "big-band salsa" track, "Si Eres Tu" features production handled by Insidro Infante. The song includes a horn ensemble, acoustic instrumentation, prominent percussion, and piano as it incorporates Afro-Latin roots. "Manaña Al Despertar" is performed by Baby Rasta and Noriega. The track's ambient synthesizers combine with strings and a string ensemble. The acoustic guitar ballad "Corazón Anestesíado" features Western Classical as well as flamenco influences. "Robarte Un Beso", a collaboration with Don Omar features a brass ensemble and prominent percussion combining salsa with dancehall music. "Menor Que Yo" lyrically addresses an experience many women share, noting that many people who see an older woman with a younger man think his motivation is money. "They never think that there might be a connection, chemistry," Ivy Queen said, while she herself thinks "there's no age requirement for two people who love each other". She said that she identifies with the song herself, having dated men 13 or 14 years younger than she.

== Release and promotion ==
Sentimiento was released on March 27, 2007. Queen said she released the album in March around her birthday as a gift to herself because it "represents my growth as a woman and my soul". It was originally slated for release on February 14, 2007. A platinum edition of the CD was released on November 20, 2007. It was announced in July 2007 that the platinum edition would see a fourth-quarter release. Queen described the platinum re-release as a "double record". She explained that "one of them is a CD with six new tracks and others themes," while the second is a DVD "where you can see pictures and music videos, and you can hear my family talking about me and who I am. The audience will see that I am a normal woman and my favorite pastime is not sailing on a yacht, but being close to my people". Both versions were re-released digitally on December 9, 2011, by Univision Records. On August 26, 2012, the album was released digitally in France. Queen performed the lead single, "Que Lloren" at the 2007 Latin Grammy Awards ceremony, dressed as "geisha—well, the reggaetón version of a geisha—and was surrounded by a Japanese masked ensemble," according to Tijana Ilich, who selected it as the cleverest act of the night. She performed "En Que Fallamos" on Don Francisco Presenta on Univision in August 2007. Queen then embarked on the "Sentimiento World Tour" in late 2007. In 2008, Queen released a live album entitled Ivy Queen 2008 World Tour LIVE!, which was recorded during one of her concerts at the Coliseo de Puerto Rico on November 30, 2007. Among the songs performed were "Que Lloren", "En Que Fallamos", "Corazón Anestesiado", "Reza Por Mi", "Dime Si Recuerdas", "Pobre Corazón" and "Sentimientos", among other songs and collaborations previous recorded for other albums.

The music video of "Que Lloren" was filmed in Downtown Miami in March 2007 and premiered on March 21, 2007, on the Univision channel television show "Primer Impacto". It featured cameos by actors from the popular telenovela, La Fea Más Bella: Niurka Marcos and Sergio Mayer. Direction was handled by Dominican-born Marlon Peña who also directed the music video for her 2005 smash-hit "Te He Querido, Te He Llorado". The music video for "En Que Fallamos" was recorded in Mexico City, Mexico. Filming took place between July 3, 2007, and July 23, 2007. Direction and production was handled by Ron Jaramillo, who said the music video would not only show the big parts of Mexico City but also "the under looked areas without neglecting hot and sensual scenes", explaining that "after all, it's talking about a relationship". He later claimed the music video to have an "urban touch" feeling. The music video was originally planned to be filmed in Miami, Florida, however, the filming location was later changed to Mexico. The music video of "Menor Que Yo" was filmed in Panama in January 2008 under the direction of the Dominican-born Marlon Peña. Production was handled by renowned Panamanian producer Alvis González of Panafilms, while the cinematography was handled by Venezuelan Alvaro Rangel. Co-produced by Marlon Films and filmed in 35mm, the music video is a continuation of "En Que Fallamos". Filming began January 30, 2008 at 9 am for the first scene and ended at 4 pm. The first scene filmed, occurs in a mall, the Center MultiPlaza. In this scene, Ivy Queen is driving a grey luxury car inside the mall, while customers and people visiting stare in amazement and wonder. Immediately after, at 4pm, the next scenes were filmed in Casco Antiguo, Panamá, with representations of the popular barrios. Production of the video cost $60,000 and 80 extras were used excluding the hundreds of bystanders. In the beginning of the music video, Queen is on a police motorcycle when she stops a young man driving a car at excessive speeds.

== Commercial performance ==
Sentimiento sold nine thousand copies in its first week, becoming Queen's first album to "invade" the Billboard 200 chart, debuting at number 105. It debuted at number four on the Billboard Latin Albums chart, behind releases by Jennifer Lopez, Los Tigres del Norte, and Grupo Bryndis. On the Billboard Latin Rhythm Albums chart, it debuted at the top spot, leading the chart for three consecutive weeks. The album has sold over 100,000 copies in Puerto Rico and Chile.

On the Billboard Latin Songs chart, "Que Lloren" debuted at number twenty-four for the week dated February 24, 2007, becoming that week's "Hot Shot Debut" and peaked at number ten on the week of May 12, 2007. On the Billboard Latin Rhythm Songs chart, the song debuted at number nine for the week of February 24, 2007 and reached number two for the week of May 12, 2007, being held off from the number-one spot by "Impacto" by Daddy Yankee and Fergie. The song debuted at number nineteen on the Billboard Tropical Songs chart and reached number four for the week of May 12, 2007. "Que Lloren" debuted at number thirty-eight on the Billboard Dance Club Play Songs chart for the week dated June 2, 2007 and peaked at number twenty the week of July 7, 2007. "En Que Fallamos" debuted at number forty-four on the Billboard Latin Songs chart for the week dated August 11, 2007 and managed a second week at that spot. On the Billboard Latin Rhythm Songs chart, the song debuted at number forty for the week of June 16, 2007 and peaked at number fourteen for the week of August 11, 2007. The song debuted at number twenty and peaked at number fifteen for the weeks of August 11 and 18, respectively on the Billboard Tropical Songs chart. On the Billboard Latin Rhythm Airplay chart, "Sentimientos" debuted at number thirty-six for the week of October 13, 2007. The next week of October 20, 2007, it peaked at number twenty-two. The following week it fell two positions landing on twenty-four. As airplay decreased, the song fell again to number thirty-one, two weeks later. The following week it rose ten positions to twenty-two. In its last week on the chart, (November 24, 2007), it fell to number thirty-three. On the Billboard Dance Club Play Songs chart, the song debuted at number forty-eight for the week of November 17, 2007. The following week it rose two positions to number forty-six. In its third week it rose two more positions to number forty-four. "Pobre Corazón" debuted at number forty-nine for the week of August 11, 2007 and peaked at number forty-five for the week of August 25, 2007 on the Billboard Latin Songs chart. On the Billboard Latin Pop Songs chart, the song debuted at number twenty-eight for the week August 11, 2007 and peaked at number twenty-four for the week of August 25, 2007. On the Billboard Latin Rhythm Airplay chart, the song debuted and peaked at number thirty-seven for the week of August 11, 2007. On the Billboard Tropical Songs chart, "Pobre Corazón" debuted and peaked at number thirty-six for the issue week of December 15, 2007. "Dime Si Recuerdas" managed to debut and peak at number thirty-five on the Billboard Latin Rhythm Songs chart for the week of December 22, 2007. The fourth single, "Menor Que Yo" debuted at number thirty-two on the Billboard Latin Rhythm Songs chart for the week of March 1, 2008 and peaked at number twenty-five for the issue dated March 8, 2008.

== Reception ==
Professional ratings
Review scores
Source	Rating
Allmusic	(favorable)
Houston Chronicle	4/5 stars

David Jeffies of Allmusic, began his review of the album by noting that with Sentimiento, it was the first time Queen entered the Billboard 200, "affirming her considerable popularity, especially in her native land." He claimed that Queen's husky voice "is well-suited to reggaetón's catchy melodies and hard-hitting beats, as evinced on the frenetic lead single "Que Lloren." According to Nelly Apaza of the Houston Chronicle, the album is pure emotions. She opinionated that Queen had never named a previous album so perfectly.

At the Latin Grammy Awards of 2007, Sentimiento was nominated for "Best Urban Music Album", which was awarded to Calle 13 and Residente o Visitante (2007). According to Queen, she should have won the award because she felt that "her music represents the true voice of the people." The night of the ceremony, Queen expressed that there were more than just one artist attending and that they only gave the awards to one artist. "They dedicated the night to Calle 13." she said. She conuntied saying that what happened that night was an injustice because even though Calle 13 won, she had the support of the public. She supported her argument by saying "If he has said that they are an alternative band so many times, why is he being awarded in the Urban category?" referring to René Pérez, lead singer of the group. The album received a nomination for "Reggaetón Album of the Year" at the 2008 Latin Billboard Music Awards, where "Que Lloren" also received a nomination for "Latin Dance Club Play Track of the Year". This was the third time Queen was nominated for "Reggaetón Album of the Year" following Diva (2004) in 2005 and Flashback (2005) in 2006. At the Premio Lo Nuestro of 2008, Sentimiento was awarded "Urban Album of the Year". Tijana Illich thought the "sweetest moment was a teary-eyed Ivy Queen finally getting recognition for her super album Sentimiento." At the 2007 and 2008 Premios Juventud award ceremonies, Queen was nominated for "Favorite Urban Artist". Ivy Queen received a gold and platinum certification in the United States for Sentimiento, signifying sales of over 100,000 copies. It was presented to her on Don Francisco Presenta by Don Francisco, where Jenni Rivera and Gloria Trevi also received certifications for their respective albums.

== Accolades ==
=== Latin Grammy Awards ===
The Latin Grammy Awards are awarded annually by the Latin Academy of Recording Arts & Sciences in the United States.

Year	Nominee / work	Award	Result
2007	Sentimiento	Best Urban Music Album	Nominated

=== Billboard Latin Music Awards ===
The Billboard Latin Music Awards are awarded annually by Billboard magazine in the United States. Ivy Queen has received two awards from eleven nominations.

Year	Nominee / work	Award	Result
2008	Sentimiento	Reggaeton Album of the Year	Nominated
2008	"Que Lloren"	Latin Dance Club Play Track of the Year	Nominated

=== Premio Lo Nuestro ===
The Premio Lo Nuestro Awards are awarded annually by the television network Univision in the United States.

Year	Nominee / work	Award	Result
2008	Sentimiento	Urban Album of the Year	Won

=== La Musa Awards ===
The Premios La Musa awards are awarded annually by in the United States. Queen was nominated to the Latin Songwriters Hall of Fame in 2017 and was later inducted in 2019.

Year	Nominee / work	Award	Result
2017	Herself: "Quiero Bailar"; "Que Lloren"; "La Vida es Así"	Latin Songwriters Hall of Fame	Nominated
2019	Herself: "Quiero Bailar"; "Que Lloren"; "La Vida es Así"	Latin Songwriters Hall of Fame	Won

== Track listing ==
No.	Title	Writer(s)	Producer(s)	Length
1.	"Intro (Qué Quieres Tú De Mí)"	Jair Morin, Evaldo Gouveia	Ivy Queen	2:16
2.	"Que Lloren"	Martha Pesante, Alex Monserrate, Urbani Mota	Monserrate & DJ Urba	3:13
3.	"Sentimientos"	Pesante	Rafi Mercenario	2:51
4.	"Pobre Corazón" (Solo by Divino)	Pesante, Daniel Velazquez	Marcos Sanchez	3:58
5.	"En Qué Fallamos"	Pesante	Rafi Mercenario	3:05
6.	"Reza Por Mí"	Pesante, Monserrate, Mota	Monserrate & DJ Urba	3:15
7.	"Cuando Comprendas" (Solo by Mikey Perfecto)	Miguel Soto	Stani	3:39
8.	"Yo Te Rescaté"	Pesante, Monserrate, Mota	Monserrate & DJ Urba	3:09
9.	"Indecisiones"	Pesante	Rafi Mercenario	3:04
10.	"Llegó El Domingo" (Solo by Naldo)	Alnaldo Santos	Escobar	3:49
11.	"Cuando No Me Tengas"	Pesante, Monserrate, Mota	Monserrate & DJ Urba	2:57
12.	"Si Eres Tú"	Pesante	Isidro Infante	4:16
13.	"Mañana Al Despertar" (Duet by Noriega and Baby Rasta)	Pesante, Norgie Noriega, Alícia Wilmer, Raymond Diaz	Norgie Noriega	2:49
14.	"Corazón Anestesiado"	Pesante, Soto	Carlos Torres	2:56
15.	"Robarte Un Beso" (featuring Don Omar)	Pesante, William Landrón	Yotuel Romero	3:18

Platinum Edition
No.	Title	Writer(s)	Producer(s)	Length
1.	"Hip Hop (Intro)"	Martha Pesante	Escobar	2:50
2.	"Menor Que Yo"	Pesante	Escobar and Zoprano	3:15
3.	"En Qué Fallamos" (Remix featuring Ken-Y)	Pesante, Kenny Vazquez	Rafi Mercenario	3:03
4.	"Dime Si Recuerdas"	Pesante, Norgie Noriega	Luny Tunes, Noriega	4:13
5.	"Que Lloren" (Remix featuring Naldo, Arcángel & Tito "El Bambino")	Pesante, Alex Monserrate, Urbani Mota, Alnado Santos, Austin Santos, Efraín Fines	Monserrate & DJ Urba	4:32
6.	"Amor De Ganster"	Pesante	Escobar and Zoprano	3:31
7.	"Robarte Un Beso" (featuring Don Omar)	Pesante, William Landrón	Yotuel Romero	3:18
8.	"Pobre Coraźon" (Duet with Divino)	Pesante, Daniel Velazquez	Marcos Sanchez	3:58
9.	"Sentimientos" (Remix featuring Randy)	Pesante	Rafi Mercenario	2:49
10.	"Reza Por Mí"	Pesante, Monserrate, Mota	Monserrate & DJ Urba	3:15
11.	"Llegó El Domingo" (Solo by Naldo)	Santos	Escobar	3:47
12.	"Cuando No Me Tengas"	Pesante, Monserrate, Mota	Monserrate & DJ Urba	2:57
13.	"Coraźon Anestesiado"	Pesante, Miguel Soto	Carlos Torres	2:58
14.	"Indecisiones"	Pesante	Rafi Mercenario	3:05
15.	"Cuando Comprendas" (Solo by Mikey Perfecto)	Soto	Stani	3:38
16.	"Yo Te Rescate"	Pesante, Monserrate, Urbani	Monserrate & DJ Urba	3:09
17.	"Manaña Al Despertar" (Duet by Baby Rasta and Noriega)	Pesante, Norgie Noriega, Alícia Wilmer, Raymond Diaz	Noriega	2:49
18.	"Si Eres Tú"	Pesante	Insidro Infante	4:16
19.	"Qué Quieres Tú De Mí"	Jair Morin, Evaldo Gouveia	Ivy Queen	2:16
20.	"En Qué Fallamos"	Pesante	Rafi Mercenario	3:04
21.	"Que Lloren"	Pesante, Monserrate, Urbani	Monserrate & DJ Urba	3:13
22.	"Pobre Corazón" (Solo by Divino)	Pesante, Velazquez	Marcos Sanchez	3:58

Platinum Edition (CD/DVD) — Disc 1
No.	Title	Writer(s)	Producer(s)	Length
1.	"Intro - Hip Hop"	Martha Pesante	Escobar	2:50
2.	"Menor Que Yo"	Pesante	Escobar and Zoprano	3:15
3.	"En Qué Fallamos" (Remix featuring Ken-Y)	Pesante, Kenny Vazquez	Rafi Mercenario	3:03
4.	"Dime Si Recuerdas"	Pesante, Norgie Noriega	Luny Tunes, Noriega	4:13
5.	"Que Lloren" (Remix featuring Nalda, Arcángel & Tito "El Bambino")	Pesante, Alex Monserrate, Urbani Mota, Alnado Santos, Austin Santos, Efraín Fines	Monserrate & DJ Urba	4:32
6.	"Amor De Ganster"	Pesante	Escobar and Zoprano	3:31
7.	"Robarte Un Beso"	Pesante	Yotuel Romero	3:18
8.	"Pobre Coraźon" (Duet with Divino)	Pesante, Daniel Velazquez	Marcos Sanchez	3:58
9.	"Sentimientos" (Remix featuring Randy)	Pesante	Rafi Mercenario	2:49
10.	"Reza Por Mí"	Pesante, Monserrate, Mota	Monserrate & DJ Urba	3:15
11.	"Llegó El Domingo" (Solo by Naldo)	Santos	Escobar	3:47
12.	"Cuando No Me Tengas"	Pesante, Monserrate, Mota	Monserrate & DJ Urba	2:57
13.	"Coraźon Anestesiado"	Pesante, Miguel Soto	Carlos Torres	2:58
14.	"Indecisiones"	Pesante	Monserrate & DJ Urba	3:05
15.	"Cuando Comprendas" (Solo by Mikey Perfecto)	Soto	Stani	3:38
16.	"Yo Te Rescate"	Pesante, Monserrate, Mota	Monserrate & DJ Urba	3:09
17.	"Manaña Al Despertar" (Duet by Baby Rasta and Noriega)	Pesante, Norgie Noriega, Alícia Wilmer, Raymond Diaz	Noriega	2:48
18.	"Si Eres Tú"	Pesante	Insidro Infante	4:16
19.	"Qué Quieres Tú De Mí"	Jair Morin, Evaldo Gouveia	Ivy Queen	2:16
20.	"En Qué Fallamos"	Pesante	Rafi Mercenario	3:04
21.	"Que Lloren"	Pesante, Monserrate, Mota	Monserrate & DJ Urba	3:13
22.	"Pobre Corazón" (Solo by Divino)	Pesante, Velazquez	Marcos Sanchez	3:58

Platinum Edition (CD/DVD) — Disc 2
No.	Title	Length
1.	"Que Lloren" (Music video)	3:49
2.	"Especial"	1:00:00
3.	"En Qué Fallamos" (Music video)	3:33
Total length:		1:07:22

Limited Collector's Edition
No.	Title	Writer(s)	Producer(s)	Length
1.	"Intro (Qué Quieres Tú De Mí)"	Jair Morin, Evaldo Gouveia	Ivy Queen	2:16
2.	"Que Lloren"	Martha Pesante, Alex Monserrate, Urbani Mota	Monserrate & DJ Urba	3:13
3.	"Sentimientos"	Pesante	Rafi Mercenario	2:51
4.	"Pobre Corazón" (Solo by Divino)	Pesante, Daniel Velazquez	Marcos Sanchez	3:58
5.	"En Qué Fallamos"	Pesante	Rafi Mercenario	3:05
6.	"Reza Por Mí"	Pesante, Monserrate, Mota	Monserrate & DJ Urba	3:15
7.	"Cuando Comprendas" (Solo by Mikey Perfecto)	Miguel Soto	Stani	3:39
8.	"Yo Te Rescaté"	Pesante, Monserrate, Mota	Monserrate & DJ Urba	3:09
9.	"Indecisiones"	Pesante	Rafi Mercenario	3:04
10.	"Llegó El Domingo" (Solo by Naldo)	Santos	Escobar	3:49
11.	"Cuando No Me Tengas"	Pesante, Monserrate, Mota	Monserrate & DJ Urba	2:57
12.	"Si Eres Tú"	Pesante	Isidro Infante	4:16
13.	"Mañana Al Despertar" (Duet by Noriega and Baby Rasta)	Pesante, Norgie Noriega, Alícia Wilmer, Raymond Diaz	Noriega	2:49
14.	"Corazón Anestesiado"	Pesante, Soto	Carlos Torres	2:56
15.	"Robarte Un Beso" (featuring Don Omar)	Pesante, William Landrón	Yotuel Romero	3:18
16.	"Que Lloren" (Cotto's N.Y Reggaetón Remix)	Pesante, Monserrate, Mota	Norty Cotto	3:25

Wal-Mart Exclusive
No.	Title	Writer(s)	Producer(s)	Length
1.	"Intro (Qué Quieres Tú De Mí)"	Jair Morin, Evaldo Gouveia	Ivy Queen	2:16
2.	"Que Lloren"	Martha Pesante, Alex Monserrate, Urbani Mota	Monserrate & DJ Urba	3:13
3.	"Sentimientos"	Pesante	Rafi Mercenario	2:51
4.	"Pobre Corazón" (Solo by Divino)	Pesante, Daniel Velazquez	Marcos Sanchez	3:58
5.	"En Qué Fallamos"	Pesante	Rafi Mercenario	3:05
6.	"Reza Por Mí"	Pesante, Monserrate, Mota	Monserrate & DJ Urba	3:15
7.	"Cuando Comprendas" (Solo by Mikey Perfecto)	Miguel Soto	Stani	3:39
8.	"Yo Te Rescaté"	Pesante, Monserrate, Mota	Monserrate & DJ Urba	3:09
9.	"Indecisiones"	Pesante	Rafi Mercenario	3:04
10.	"Llegó El Domingo" (Solo by Naldo)	Alnaldo Santos	Escobar	3:49
11.	"Cuando No Me Tengas"	Pesante, Monserrate, Mota	Monserrate & DJ Urba	2:57
12.	"Si Eres Tú"	Pesante	Isidro Infante	4:16
13.	"Mañana Al Despertar" (Duet by Noriega and Baby Rasta)	Pesante, Norgie Noriega, Alícia Wilmer, Raymond Diaz	Noriega	2:49
14.	"Corazón Anestesiado"	Pesante, Soto	Carlos Torres	2:56
15.	"Robarte Un Beso" (featuring Don Omar)	Pesante, William Landrón	Yotuel Romero	3:18
16.	"Que Lloren" (Cotto's N.Y Reggaetón Remix)	Pesante, Monserrate, Mota	Norty Cotto	3:25

== Personnel ==
The credits are taken from the albums' liner notes

"Intro - Que Quieres Tú De Mí" (Wixen Music Publishing, Inc)

- Ivy Queen — interpreter, acoustic guitar
- Evaldo Gouveia — composer
- Jair Amorim — composer

"Que Lloren" (IQ Publishing/BMI)

- Ivy Queen — interpreter, composer
- DJ Urba & Monserrate — musical production
- Los Yedias Recording Studio — recording location

"Sentimientos" (IQ Publishing/BMI)

- Ivy Queen — interpreter, composer
- Rafi Mercenario — musical production
- Marroneo Studios — recording location

"Pobre Corazón" (Onivid Music Publishing)

- Daniel Velazquez "Divino" — interpreter, composer
- Ivy Queen — composer
- Marcos Sanchez — musical production

"En Que Fallamos" (IQ Publishing/BMI)

- Ivy Queen — interpreter, composer
- Rafi Mercenario — musical production
- Marroneo Studios — recording location

"Reza Por Mí" (IQ Publishing/BMI)

- Ivy Queen — interpreter, composer
- DJ Urba & Monserrate — musical production
- Los Yedias Recording Studio — recording location

"Cuando Comprendas" (Funky Town Music/ASCAP)

- Mickey Perfecto — interpreter, composer, musical production
- Ivy Queen — composer
- Stani — musical production
- Stani Recording Studio — recording location

"Yo Te Rescaté" (IQ Publishing/BMI/Funky Town Music/ASCAP)

- Ivy Queen — interpreter, composer
- Mickey Perfecto — composer
- DJ Urba & Monserrate — musical production
- Los Yedias Recording Studio — recording location

"Indecisiones" (IQ Publishing/BMI)

- Ivy Queen — interpreter, composer
- DJ Urba & Monserrate — musical production
- Los Yedias Recording Studio — recording location

"Llegó El Domingo" (Sangre Nueva Publishing)

- Naldo Sangre Nueva — interpreter, composer
- Escobar — musical production
- Sangre Nueva Recording Studio — recording location

"Cuando No Me Tengas" (IQ Publishing/BMI)

- Ivy Queen — interpreter, composer
- Naldo Sangre Nueva — musical production
- Sangre Nueva Recording Studio — recording location

"Si Eres Tú" (IQ Publishing/BMI)

- Ivy Queen — interpreter, composer
- Isidro Infante — musical production
- AQ-30 Recording Studio — recording location

"Mañana Al Despertar" (Noriega Music Publishing)

- Norgie Noriega — interpreter, composer, musical production
- Baby Rasta — interpreter, composer
- Marioso — mixing engineer
- Flow Music Studios — recording location

"Corazón Anestesiado" (IQ Publishing/BMI)

- Ivy Queen — interpreter, composer
- Carlos "Chaveta" Torres — musical production, acoustic guitar
- Jesus in 2in Recording Studio — recording location

"Robarte Un Beso" (IQ Publishing/BMI)

- Ivy Queen — interpreter, composer
- Don Omar — interpreter, composer, featured artist
- Yotuel Romero — musical production
- Marioso — mixing engineer
- Flow Music Studios — recording location

"Intro - Hip Hop" (IQ Publishing/BMI)

- Ivy Queen — interpreter, composer
- Miguel Márquez "Escobar" — musical production
- Andrés Arroyo "Zoprano" — musical production
- Contrabando Music Group — record label

"Menor Que Yo" (IQ Publishing/BMI)

- Ivy Queen — interpreter, composer
- Miguel Márquez "Escobar" — musical production
- Andrés Arroyo "Zoprano" — musical production
- Contrabando Music Group — record label

"En Que Fallamos (Remix featuring Ken-Y)" (IQ Publishing/BMI)

- Ivy Queen — interpreter, composer
- Ken-Y — interpreter, composer, featured artist
- Rafi Mecenario — musical production
- Marroneo Studios — recording location

"Dime Si Recuerdas" (IQ Publishing/BMI)

- Ivy Queen — interpreter, composer
- Norgie Noriega — composer, musical production
- Luny Tunes — musical production

"Que Lloren (Remix featuring Arcangel, Naldo, and Tito "El Bambino")" (IQ Publishing/BMI)

- Ivy Queen — interpreter, composer
- Arcangel — interpreter, composer, featured artist
- Naldo — interpreter, composer, featured artist
- Tito "El Bambino" — interpreter, composer, featured artist
- DJ Urba & Monserrate — musical production
- Los Yedais Recording Studio — recording location

"Amor De Ganster" (IQ Publishing/BMI)

- Ivy Queen — lyrics, interpreter, composer
- Miguel Márquez "Escobar" — musical production
- Andrés Arroyo "Zoprano" — musical production
- Contrabando Music Group — record label

"Pobre Corazón (Divino featuring Ivy Queen)" (Onivid Music Publishing)

- Divino — primary artist, interpreter, composer
- Ivy Queen — interpreter, composer, featured artist
- Marcos Sánches — musical production

"Sentimientos (Remix featuring Randy)" (IQ Publishing/BMI)

- Ivy Queen — interpreter, composer
- Randy — interpreter, composer, featured artist
- Rafi Mercenario — musical production
- Marroneo Studios — recording location

"Que Lloren (Limited Edition Bonus Track)" (IQ Publishing/BMI)

- Ivy Queen — interpreter, composer
- Norty Cotto — musical production
- Pro Motion — executive production
- Los Yedais Recording Studio — recording location

=== Technical credits ===
- Ivy Queen — Audio production, executive production, musical production, primary artist
- Luis Moreno — project manager
- Esteban Piñero — mastering engineer
- Holly Chen — art direction
- Mark Greenburg — legal advisor
- Gary Bondereko — photography
- Manuel Bou by Angel Lopez — outfit
- Maria Laureano — nail design

== Chart performance ==
=== Weekly charts ===
Chart (2007)	Peak position
US Billboard 200	105
US Comprehensive Albums (Billboard)	93
US Rap Albums (Billboard)	24
US Latin Albums (Billboard)	4
US Latin Rhythm Albums (Billboard)	1

=== Year-end charts ===
Chart (2007)	Position
US Latin Albums (Billboard)	33
US Latin Rhythm Albums (Billboard)	8
Chart (2008)	Position
US Latin Albums (Billboard)	51
US Latin Rhythm Albums (Billboard)	6

== Sales and certifications ==
Region	Certification	Certified units/sales
United States (RIAA)	Platinum (Latin)	154,000+

== See also ==
- List of number-one Billboard Latin Rhythm Albums of 2007
