= En Que Fallamos =

Single by Ivy Queen

from the album Sentimiento
- Released: February 2007
- Recorded: 2006–2007; Marroneo Studios (Bayamón, Puerto Rico)
- Genre: Reggaetón, R&B
- Length: 3:05 (Album version); 3:03 (Remix version)
- Label: Univision, Drama
- Songwriter: Martha Pesante
- Producer: Rafi Mercenario

Ivy Queen singles chronology
"Que Lloren" (2007)	"En Que Fallamos" (2007)	"Sentimientos" (2007)

"En Que Fallamos" (English: "Where Did We Fail?") is a song by Puerto Rican reggaetón recording artist Ivy Queen, from her sixth studio album, Sentimiento (2007). It was composed by Queen, produced by Rafi Mercenario, and released as the second single from the album in February 2007. Characterized as "hardcore reggaetón", the song lyrically tells a story of when a relationship ends. A remix with Ken-Y was also recorded and featured on the platinum edition of the album. The song's accompanying music video was filmed in Mexico beginning on July 3, 2007. It was directed by Ron Jaramillo. The song reached the top 15 of both the Latin Rhythm Airplay and Latin Tropical Airplay charts. Ivy Queen along with Ken-Y also performed the remix to the song as a part of the setlist of her 2008 World Tour which was held from the José Miguel Agrelot Coliseum, known as the Coliseum of Puerto Rico in San Juan, Puerto Rico as well on R.K.M & Ken-Y's Romantico 360° Tour in 2009.

== Background ==
Following the success of Queen's fifth studio album in 2005 in the Latin market, she began working on her sixth studio album in 2006. She wanted to create a new album with more slower and romantic reggaetón. This stemmed from Queen divorcing her husband of nine years and releasing all of her anger on Flashback. Not wanting to go into detail, she "acknowledged the songs were just one way she dealt with the end of an 11-year relationship". On the album, as a part of her evolution in reggaetón, she includes "solo turns", instead of duets by guest artist. Of the solo tracks on the album is "Pobre Corazón" by Divino while others include "Manaña Al Despertar" by Baby Rasta and Noriega where the artist performed songs without vocals by Ivy Queen. She said she wanted to give a 180-degree turn to what people think of reggaetón. She explained "Many think reggaetón is just nice rhythms to dance to. And they forget there are song-writers and composers, who, like everyone else, also suffer and aspire in love". She wanted the album to be about that. She said "Love is what makes us write things, what keeps us alive. If we did not have love, we would have nothing".

== Composition ==
Ivy Queen featuring Ken-Y "En Que Fallamos" - Remix (2007)
A 30-second sample of the remix version of "En Que Fallamos" featuring part of the chorus. The chorus to the remix of "En Que Fallamos" is a back-and-forth dialogue between Queen and Ken-Y.

"En Que Fallamos", the second single from the album, was written by Ivy Queen herself. It has been described as being "hardcore reggaeton". The song was recorded at Marroneo Studios in Bayamón, Puerto Rico along with the third single "Sentimientos" and "Indecisiones" from the album.

It was produced by a team of Puerto Rican producers at the legendary Marroneo Studios in Bayamón, Puerto Rico. The team involved producers Julian, Sosa, Gabo Lugo, and Rafi Mercenario, who has produced her previous singles "Cuéntale" and "Libertad" and the "reggaeton-ed up twist on Selena's classic "Si Una Vez" among others.

Lyrically, Ivy Queen described the song as being what happened to her when a relationship ended. She said it is very "honest and straightforward "explaining that she wanted to "show people the stormy times that I lived." Ivy Queen worked with Puerto Rican rapper Ken-Y, one half of the reggaeton duo R.K.M & Ken-Y on the "romantic" remix to the song.

== Release and chart performance ==
"En Que Fallamos" was released in February 2007 as the second single from the album by Univision Records behind "Que Lloren" and before "Sentimientos". On the Billboard Hot Latin Songs chart, the song debuted at #44 for the week of August 11, 2007. It spent an additional week at that spot. On the Billboard Latin Rhythm Songs chart, the song debuted at #40 for the week of June 16, 2007 and peaked at #14 for the week of August 11, 2007. On the Billboard Latin Tropical Songs chart, the song debuted at #20 for the week of August 11, 2007 and peaked at #15 for the week of August 18, 2007.

== Music video ==
Ivy Queen in the music video for the song "En Que Fallamos". In this scene, Queen sees that her lover is cheating on her.

The music video for "En Que Fallamos" was recorded in Mexico City, Mexico. Filming took place between July 3, 2007, and July 23, 2007. Direction and production was handled by Ron Jaramillo, who said the music video would not only show the big parts of Mexico City but also "the under looked areas without neglecting hot and sensual scenes", explaining that "after all, it's talking about a relationship".

He later claimed the music video to have an "urban touch" feeling. The music video was originally planned to be filmed in Miami, Florida, however, the filming location was later changed to Mexico. Ivy Queen's following music video for "Menor Que Yo" is a continuation of "En Que Fallamos".

== Track listing ==
Digital Download
No.	Title	Writer(s)	Producer(s)	Length
1.	"En Que Fallamos"	Martha I. Pesante	Rafi Mercenario	3:05
Total length:				3:04

CD Single
No.	Title	Writer(s)	Producer(s)	Length
1.	"En Que Fallamos" (Panaghi Club Mix)	Pesante	Chris "The Greek" Panaghi	7:04
2.	"En Que Fallamos" (Panaghi Radio Mix)	Pesante	Chris "The Greek" Panaghi	4:24
3.	"En Que Fallamos" (Panaghi Dub Mix)	Pesante	Chris "The Greek" Panaghi	6:17
4.	"En Que Fallamos" (N.Y. Reggaeton Mix)	Pesante	Norty Cotto	3:17
5.	"En Que Fallamos" (N.Y. Reggaeton Instrumental)	Pesante	Norty Cotto	3:15
Total length:				27:22

== Credits and personnel ==
Adapted from album's liner notes.

- En Que Fallamos 3:05 — (IQ Publishing/BMI)
- Interpreter/Composer: Ivy Queen
- Musical Production: Rafi Mercenario, Sosa, Julian, Gabo Lugo
- Mastering: Esteban Piñero
- Recording: Marroneo Studios in Bayamón, Puerto Rico
- Art Direction: Holly Chen
- Costume: Manuel Bou by Angel López
- Photography: Garg Bonderenko
- Makeup and Hair: Ariel Hernández
- Nail Design: Maria Laureano

== Charts ==
Chart (2007)	Peak Position
US Latin Songs (Billboard)	44
US Latin Tropical Airplay (Billboard)	15
US Latin Rhythm Airplay (Billboard)	14
US Latin Rhythm Digital Songs (Billboard)	15
