= Nostra =

Nostra may refer to:

== Literature ==
- Quo usque tandem abutere, Catilina, patientia nostra? is a Latin phrase from Marcus Tullius Cicero's first speech against Catilina.

== Music ==
- Cosa Nostra: Hip Hop is a 2006 hip-hop compilation album by Ivy Queen
- Cosa Nostra Never Sleeps is a Johnny Thunders bootleg recorded on June 19, 1983, at Folkets Park, Södertälje
- Koza nostra is the tenth studio album from Serbian and former Yugoslav rock band Riblja Čorba
- La Coka Nostra is an American hip hop group
- Nostra is a French-Latvian post-rock/post-metal band
- West Koastra Nostra is the sixth album by Samoan rap group, Boo-Yaa T.R.I.B.E.

== Organizations ==
- Cosa Nostra is a name given to the Sicilian Mafia and the Italian-American Mafia
- Europa Nostra, the pan-European Federation for Cultural Heritage, is the representative platform of 250 heritage NGOs active in 45 countries across Europe
- Italia Nostra is an Italian not for profit campaigning organisation
- Kosher Nostra is a name given to Jewish-American organized crime

== Politics ==
- Audemus jura nostra defendere (Latin "We Dare To Defend Our Rights") is the state motto of Alabama
- Provincia Nostra was a name given to Gallia Narbonensis, a Roman province located in what is now Provence

== Religion ==
- Nostra aetate is the Declaration on the Relation of the Church with Non-Christian Religions of the Second Vatican Council
- Nostra Signora del Santissimo Sacramento e Santi Martiri Canadesi (Our Lady of the Blessed Sacrament and the Canadian Martyrs) is the Roman Catholic national church of Canada, on Via Giovanni Battista de Rossi, Rome
- The Sanctuary of Nostra Signora della Misericordia is a church and surrounding buildings located some six kilometers from the center of Savona, Liguria, northern Italy
- Nostra Signora delle Grazie is a devotion to the Virgin Mary in the Roman Catholic Church
- The Shrine of Nostra Signora della Guardia is a Catholic place of pilgrimage and is located on the top of Mount Figogna
- Nostra Signora di Tergu is a parish church in Tergu, province of Sassari, Sardinia, Italy
- Nostra Signora del Sacro Cuore is a Catholic church dedicated to the Blessed Virgin Mary located in Rome's Piazza Navona
- Nostra Signora di Guadalupe e San Filippo Martire is the national church of Mexico in Rome

== Science ==
- Euroleon nostras is an antlion found over most of Europe.

== Television ==
- Terra Nostra (telenovela) is a Brazilian telenovela.
