= Mexiclan =

- Origin: Mexico
- Genres: Rap
- Years active: 2003 – present
- Label: Univision Records
- Members: Sem Vargas; Marco Antonio Muñoz
- Website: www.mexiclan.com

Mexiclan is a Latin rap duo composed of Sem Vargas and Marco Antonio Muñoz. Their first self-titled album was released by Univision Records on January 13, 2004, and that same year the album charted on Billboard's Top Latin Albums chart peaking at number 51.

== Discography ==
- 2004: Mexiclan
- 2005: Mexiclanos Unidos
- 2006: El Nuevo Imperio

== External review ==
- Detailed Review of Mexiclan Album
