= Sentimientos =

Sentimientos may refer to:

- Sentimientos (album), an album by Colombian singer Charlie Zaa
- "Sentimientos" (song), a song by Puerto Rican singer Ivy Queen
- "Sentimientos" (tango), by Andrés Linetzky and Ernesto Romeo
