= Dime Si Recuerdas =

2007 song performed by Ivy Queen

Promotional single by Ivy Queen

from the album Sentimiento: Platinum Edition
- Released: November 20, 2007
- Recorded: 2007
- Genre: Traditional bachata
- Length: 4:13
- Label: Univision, Drama
- Songwriters: Martha Pesante, Norgie Noriega
- Producers: Luny Tunes, Noriega

Audio sample
- A 30 second sample of "Dime Si Recuerdas" featuring the chorus and its tropical bachata ballad tempo.: file; help

"Dime Si Recuerdas" (English: Tell Me If You Remember) is a song recorded by Puerto Rican reggaetón recording artist Ivy Queen, for the platinum edition of her sixth studio album, Sentimiento (2007). It was composed by Queen and Norgie Noriega and produced by Luny Tunes and Noriega. Lyrically the song is asking someone if they remember the good memories they shared and the time they spent together.

The song is a tropical bachata ballad. Ivy Queen performed the song as a part of the setlist of her 2008 World Tour which was held from the José Miguel Agrelot Coliseum known as the Coliseum of Puerto Rico in San Juan, Puerto Rico.

== Background ==
Ivy Queen began working on her sixth studio album in 2006 after divorcing from her husband of nine years. Wanting to go in a different direction than her previous albums, she said she wanted to give a 180-degree turn to what people think of reggaetón. She explained "Many think reggaetón is just nice rhythms to dance to. And they forget there are song-writers and composers, who, like everyone else, also suffer and aspire in love". She wanted the album to be about that. She said "Love is what makes us write things, what keeps us alive. If we did not have love, we would have nothing". After the commercial success of the album, which was certified Platinum by the United States Recording Industry Association of America (RIAA), a platinum edition and substantial live album was distributed by Univision and Machete in late-2007 and 2008 respectively. Of the seven new tracks featured on the platinum edition was "Dime Si Recuerdas" while a rerecording of the Top 10 hit "Que Lloren" also appears.

== Composition ==
It was produced by the Dominican-born reggaeton production duo Luny Tunes and the Puerto Rican-born reggaeton producer Noriega. Luny Tunes has worked with Ivy Queen in the past producing much of her early work, including "Te He Querido, Te He Llorado" which appeared on Luny Tunes' second compilation album Mas Flow 2 (2005).

As well as Noriega, who has produced songs from Queen such as "Quiero Saber" in 2002 and "Amiga No Pienses" which appeared on Noriega's second compilation album Contra La Corriente (2004). "Dime Si Recuerdas" is a bachata song. A musical bolero-based genre that originated in the Dominican Republic and spread to parts of the world including Latin America while becoming popular in places such as Puerto Rico.

== Charts ==
"Dime Si Recuerdas" was featured on the platinum edition of the album, as the fourth track. It managed to debut and peak at #35 on the Latin Rhythm Airplay chart for the week of December 22, 2007.

Chart (2007)	Peak Position
US Latin Rhythm Airplay (Billboard)	35
US Latin Rhythm Digital Songs (Billboard)	28

== Credits and personnel ==
- Album Version
  - Dime Si Recuerdas 4:13 — (IQ Publishing/BMI)
  - Interpreters/Composers: Ivy Queen/Norgie Noriega
  - Executive Production: Ivy Queen
  - Musical Production: Luny Tunes/Noriega
  - Mastering: Esteban Piñero
  - Art Direction: Holly Chen
  - Photography: Garg Bonderenko
  - Makeup and Hair: Ariel Hernández
- Live Version
  - Mixing Engineer: Arnaldo Santo "Naldo" & Miguel Pequero
  - Musical Director: Miguel Márquez "Escobar"
  - Bass: José Aponte
  - Guitar: Juan C. Rodríguez
  - Keyboards: Andres Arroyo "Zoprano"
  - Drums: Antonio Alonso "Papito"
  - Percussion: Omar Soto "Pooh"
  - Güira: Lionel Rodríguez "Leo"
  - Chorus 1: Julio Cartagena "Corbata"
  - Chorus 2: Zulma Oviedo
  - Chorus 3: Orlando Rosario "Orlandito"
  - DJ: David Montañez "DJ Davey"
  - Sound: Comco Audio
  - Sound Engineer Monitors: Ryan Vargas
  - Sound Engineer FOH: Manuel Comulada
