= Mexiclan (album) =

2004 studio album by Mexiclan

Studio album by Mexiclan
- Released: January 13, 2004
- Genres: Rap, hip hop
- Length: 40:04
- Label: Univision
- Producer: Abel DeLuna

Mexiclan chronology
Mexiclan (2004)	Mexiclanos Unidos (2005)

Mexiclan is the debut album of Mexiclan, composed of Sem Vargas and Marco Antonio Muñoz. It was released on January 13, 2004, and that same year the album was charted on Billboard Top Latin Albums chart peaking at number 51.

== Track listing ==
No.	Title	Length
1.	"Sermón"	0:34
2.	"Stupid & Creído"	4:07
3.	"Me Siento Bien"	3:12
4.	"Alas 4:20"	3:53
5.	"F*r*e*a*k*y*" (feat: Bérengère Basty)	2:56
6.	"I’m a Mexiclano"	0:07
7.	"Raza Mexiclana"	3:17
8.	"Mi Papá Lloraba"	4:18
9.	"Meet Tha Pro-Jects"	3:06
10.	"Sancho"	3:06
11.	"Mama Say Chill"	2:30
12.	"F@$k Fonzy"	0:06
13.	"Pus Sí, Pero No"	3:36
