= Cosa Nostra: Hip Hop =

2005 compilation album by Ivy Queen and Gran Omar

Compilation album by Ivy Queen and Gran Omar
- Released: 15 November 2005
- Recorded: 2005
- Genre: Hip hop
- Length: 49:02
- Label: Univison, Filtro
- Producer: DJ Blass, DJ Colo, Ecko, Diesel, Haze, Hyde, Gran Omar, Ivy Queen

Ivy Queen chronology
Flashback (2005)	Cosa Nostra: Hip Hop (2005)	The Best of Ivy Queen (2005)

Cosa Nostra: Hip Hop is the second compilation album by Puerto Rican recording artist Ivy Queen, and the first by Puerto Rican-American recording artist Gran Omar. It was released on 15 November 2005. The album features songs performed in the genre of hip hop by Ivy Queen, Gran Omar, Arcángel, De la Ghetto, Terror Squad's Tony Sunshine, Rey Severo, Haze and Moreno.

The album's lead single was selected to be Queen's "No Hacen Na". The song peaked at number twenty-five on the Billboard Latin Rhythm Songs chart and number thirty on the Billboard Tropical Songs chart in mid-2006. The album failed to chart in Billboard magazine.

== Background ==
Following the failed commercial success of Queen's first two studio albums, Queen was dropped from the Sony label and took a hiatus from her musical career in 1999. Returning to the music industry with her third studio album, Diva, which was highly anticipated and acclaimed and later recognized as a factor in reggaeton's mainstream exposure in 2004 along with Daddy Yankee's Barrio Fino and Tego Calderon's El Enemy de los Guasíbiri, after being certified Platinum by the Recording Industry Association of America. She then began working on her fourth studio album Real. It too was a commercial success, to a lesser extent, despite initially being Queen's debut full-length English-language studio album. She then embarked on the "Reggaeton Tour 2004" which also featured other artist including Aldo Ranks and La Factoria in various South American countries including Ecuador where she performed songs such as "Papi Te Quiero" and "Tu No Puedes" in promotion of the album. This was her first tour in South America which began in 2004 and lead into 2005.

In June 2005, Ivy Queen partnered with co-founder of Perfect Image Records, José Guadalupe to form Filtro Musik. This stemmed from Guadalupe parting ways with the other co-founder of Perfect Image Anthony Pérez who in turn would launch his own label The Roof Records. Filtro Musik's concept initially stemmed from its name which means filter in English. "I've been in this industry 15 years, and we have the ability to filter and pick the best" said Guadalupe. In the coming year, Univision signed the label to licensing plan to release the album in September 2005. As a result, "this ensured that the album was positioned in Latin and mainstream accounts that would normally not carry Latin product." It became a commercial success with three Top 10 singles. Ivy Queen was previously married to fellow reggaeton artist Omar Navarro, known by his stage name Gran Omar. They were divorced in 2005 shortly before the release of Flashback, which influenced the composition of the album. She denied ever having found him in the act of adultery, while claiming that if she had found Navarro with another woman, she'd be in La Vega Alta, a prison for women in Puerto Rico. She also denied rumors that she had physically assaulted the woman she caught with Navarro. She stated they had not lived with each other for two months citing the "extensive travels of her husband and his workload of being a producer" as being causes to the end of the nine-year marriage. The label then released Cosa Nostra: Hip-Hop in 2006.

== Controversy ==
Co-producer of the album, Gran Omar stated that Queen had tricked him, and that she owed him money from the sales and production of the album Cosa Nostra: Hip-Hop. No legal action was taken, however. Navarro was invited by Jorge Guadalupe, Ivy Queen's manager to take legal action, as he has all the papers stating that there was no deception with the album. Guadalupe called Navarro "someone who misses the money and the high-life" he had while he was married to Queen. Navarro would also go on national television and accuse Queen of being unfaithful in their relationship on the television program Escándalo TV (Telefutura). He would also mention the accusations that Queen owed him money from the album as well on the program.

== Track listing ==
No.	Title	Writer(s)	Performer(s)	Length
1.	"Paquetes" (featuring Haze and Moreno)	Omar Navarro	Gran Omar	3:57
2.	"No Hacen Na"	Martha Pesante, Armando Rosario, Paul Irizarry	Ivy Queen	2:09
3.	"Amor A Lo Ganster"	Navarro	Gran Omar	3:26
4.	"Chica Linda" (featuring Rey Severo)	Navarro, Rey Severo	Gran Omar	4:44
5.	"I'm Doin Fine"		Haze	3:03
6.	"Muevete" (featuring Rey Severo)	Navarro, Severo	Gran Omar	3:30
7.	"Guerrilleros Campeones" (featuring Tony Sunshine)	Pesante, Antonio Cruz	Ivy Queen	2:13
8.	"Vive Duro" (featuring Rey Severo)	Navarro, Severo	Gran Omar	2:19
9.	"De La Calle"	Pesante	Ivy Queen	3:05
10.	"Pa Los Barrios Caserios"	Navarro	Gran Omar	3:54
11.	"R.I.P." (featuring Rey Severo and Kenny)	Navarro, Severo	Gran Omar	3:37
12.	"Se La Pueden Buscar"	Austin Santos, Rafael Castillo	Arcángel & De la Ghetto	4:18
13.	"Hazme Caso"	Navarro	Gran Omar	3:27
14.	"Tengan Mi Dinero"	Navarro	Gran Omar	3:51
15.	"Bad Girl"	Pesante, Rosario, Irizarry	Ivy Queen & Gran Omar	2:38
