= No Hacen Na =

Single by Ivy Queen

from the album Cosa Nostra: Hip Hop
- Released: July 2006
- Recorded: 2005–2006
- Genre: Hip hop
- Length: 2:10
- Label: Univision, Filtro Musik
- Songwriters: Martha Pesante, Paul Irizarry, Armando Rosario
- Producers: DJ Colo, Echo, Hyde “El Quimico”

Ivy Queen singles chronology
"Libertad" (2006)	"No Hacen Na" (2006)	"Que Lloren" (2007)

Audio sample
- A 23 second sample of "No Hacen Na" featuring the chorus and it's hip-hop tempo.: file; help

"No Hacen Na" (English: They Don't Do Anything) is a song by Puerto Rican reggaetón recording artist Ivy Queen, from her second compilation album, Cosa Nostra: Hip Hop (2006). It was composed by Queen, produced by Filtro Musik. Forced to release an album with her then-husband who she was going through a divorce at the time due to their multi-album contract with Univision, the song was released as a promotional single on June 10, 2006. Lyrically the song is telling people that she is ready whenever they are and that isn't scared. Ivy Queen performed the song on a live edition of the Puerto Rican television program Sábado Gigante. The song was believed to be a diss track towards reggaeton hip-hop artist Temperamento and La Nina who released a diss track toward Queen that resembled the lyrics of "Quiero Bailar".

== Background ==
Following the failed commercial success of Queen's first two studio albums, Queen was dropped from the Sony label and took a hiatus from her musical career in 1999. Returning to the music industry with her third studio album, Diva, which was highly anticipated and acclaimed and later recognized as a factor in reggaeton's mainstream exposure in 2004 along with Daddy Yankee's Barrio Fino and Tego Calderon's El Enemy de los Guasíbiri, after being certified Platinum by the Recording Industry Association of America. She then began working on her fourth studio album Real. It too was a commercial success, to a lesser extent, despite initially being Queen's debut full-length English-language studio album. She then embarked on the "Reggaeton Tour 2004" which also featured other artist including Aldo Ranks and La Factoria in various South American countries including Ecuador where she performed songs such as "Papi Te Quiero" and "Tu No Puedes" in promotion of the album. This was her first tour in South America which began in 2004 and lead into 2005.

In June 2005, Ivy Queen partnered with co-founder of Perfect Image Records, José Guadalupe to form Filtro Musik. This stemmed from Guadalupe parting ways with the other co-founder of Perfect Image Anthony Pérez who in turn would launch his own label The Roof Records. Filtro Musik's concept initially stemmed from its name which means filter in English. "I've been in this industry 15 years, and we have the ability to filter and pick the best" said Guadalupe. In the coming year, Univision signed the label to licensing plan to release the album in September 2005. As a result, "this ensured that the album was positioned in Latin and mainstream accounts that would normally not carry Latin product." It became a commercial success with three Top 10 singles. Ivy Queen was previously married to fellow reggaeton artist Omar Navarro, known by his stage name Gran Omar. They were divorced in 2005 shortly before the release of Flashback, which influenced the composition of the album. She denied ever having found him in the act of adultery, while claiming that if she had found Navarro with another woman, she'd be in La Vega Alta, a prison for women in Puerto Rico. She also denied rumors that she had physically assaulted the woman she caught with Navarro. She stated they had not lived with each other for two months citing the "extensive travels of her husband and his workload of being a producer" as being causes to the end of the nine-year marriage. The label then released Cosa Nostra: Hip-Hop in 2006.

== Composition and controversy ==
"No Hacen Na" was composed by Queen herself. It is a hip-hop track. Cosa Nostra: Hip-Hop, the album from which the song originates was quite controversial after being released. Omar Navarro stated that Queen had tricked him, and that she owed him money from the sales and production of the album Cosa Nostra: Hip-Hop. No legal action was taken, however. Navarro was invited by Jorge Guadalupe, Ivy Queen's manager to take legal action, as he has all the papers stating that there was no deception with the album. Guadalupe called Navarro "someone who misses the money and the high-life" he had while he was married to Queen. Navarro would also go on national television and accuse Queen of being unfaithful in their relationship on the television program Escándalo TV (Telefutura). He would also mention the accusations that Queen owed him money from the album as well on the program.

== Charts ==
The song was released as the album's promotional single on June 10, 2006, by Univision. On the Billboard Latin Rhythm Airplay chart, the song debuted at #31 for the week of July 15, 2006 and peaked at #25 the following week of July 22, 2006. In its third week on the chart, it fell to #27 for the issue dated July 29, 2006. It rose to #25 the following week of August 5, 2006 ending its reign. On the Latin Tropical Airplay chart, the song debuted and peaked at #30 for the week of July 22, 2006.

Chart (2006)	Peak Position
US Latin Rhythm Airplay (Billboard)	25
US Latin Tropical Airplay (Billboard)	30
