= Monserrate & DJ Urba =

Reggaeton producers from Puerto Rico and the Dominican Republic

Los Jedis
- Also known as: Los Jedays
- Origin: Puerto Rico
- Genres: Reggaeton
- Occupations: Musician; producer
- Years active: 2003–2010
- Labels: El Cartel; Mas Flow
- Members: Alex Monserrate Sosa; Urbani Mota Cedeño

Monserrate and DJ Urba (also known as Los Jedys) are reggaeton producers from Puerto Rico and the Dominican Republic, respectively. They have been on the business for some years, but they really got a start when Daddy Yankee hired them to produce his Barrio Fino Album. Then they followed up with the Barrio Fino en Directo Album. They are aligned with Luny Tunes's Mas Flow Inc and Daddy Yankee's El Cartel Records.

== DJ Monserrate ==
Alex A. Monserrate Sosa, artistically known as DJ Monserrate From a young age, he showed passion for music and after overcoming various obstacles, he has now become a very well respected musical producer in the reggaeton community. Monserrate has worked with artists such as Daddy Yankee and his notorious El Cartel Records (Dale Caliente, No Me Dejes Solo, Rompe, Machete, Taladro, El Muro, ¿Qué Vas a Hacer?, El Truco, and other hits). Monserrate has also worked with other Reggaeton artist, like Wisin & Yandel, Nicky Jam, Yaviah, Alexis & Fido, and also produced for artists outside the reggaeton world doing their remixes, such as Carlos Vives, Thalía, Cabas, among others. Monserrate won his first Latin Grammy in 2005 as musical producer of Daddy Yankee's Barrio Fino, which reported sales of 2 million copies and counting. Monserrate works alongside DJ Urba, both producers are currently working in their upcoming production titled Los Jedays which is set to be released soon. Monserrate had been diagnosed with Lymphoma non-hodgking cancer disease, after getting treatment in Puerto Rico he overcame this disease. He continues to work with artist on their albums' including Tito El Bambino's El Patron and Ivy Queen's Sentimiento.

Monserrate teamed up with Sosa since 2016.

== DJ Urba ==
Urba continues working production on other themes on 2010 and 2011. He was previously in a relationship with fellow reggaeton artist Ivy Queen from mid-2006 to 2007, he and Monserrate produced a chunk of her studio album Sentimiento including the lead single "Que Lloren".

Urba teamed up with DJ Rome since 2016, and work again with Daddy Yankee to produce "Shaky Shaky" and "Dura".

== Production credits ==
=== 2003 ===
Los Homerun-es - Daddy Yankee

- 14. No Te Canses, El Funeral ft. Julio Voltio

=== 2004 ===
El Sobreviviente - Wisin

- 04. Saoco ft. Daddy Yankee

Barrio Fino - Daddy Yankee

- 03. Dale Caliente
- 04. No Me Dejes Solo ft. Wisin & Yandel
- 07. El Muro

=== 2005 ===
Barrio Fino en Directo - Daddy Yankee

- 11. Rompe
- 14. Machete Reloaded ft. Paul Wall
- 16. El Truco

Pa'l Mundo, Deluxe Edition - Wisin & Yandel

- 1. Te noto tensa ft. Tony Dize
- 2. Toma Ft Franco el Gorila

Peso Completo - John Eric

- 10. Tembleque
- 12. Bailen ft. Zion & Lennox

=== 2006 ===
Respect - Lisa M

- 02. Fuego
- 03. Asi Es Que Eh ft. Hurricane G, La Bruja, K-mil & Miss Waidy
- 04. Hazme Tuya
- 05. Fuete
- 06. Hey Ladies

Los Vaqueros - Wisin & Yandel

- 04. Eléctrica ft. Gadiel
- 07. Mujerón ft. El Tío
- 12. Chu Chin ft. El Tío
- 14. Un Viaje ft. Gadiel
- 17. Round 3 ft. Franco "El Gorila"
- 18. Yo Quiero Hacerte El Amor ft. Franco "El Gorila" & El Tío
- 19. Calienta y Pega ft. El Tío
- 21. Sal del Callejón ft. Franco "El Gorila"

=== 2007 ===
Masterpiece: Commemorative Edition - R.K.M & Ken-Y

- 02. Dame Lo Que Quiero (New Version)

Sentimiento - Ivy Queen

- 02. Que Lloren
- 06. Reza Por Mi
- 08. Yo Te Rescaté
- 11. Cuando No Me Tengas

It's My Time - Tito El Bambino

- 02. El Tra
- 05. El Bum Bum
- 09. Solo Dime Que Sí
- 15. Sol, Playa & Arena Ft. Jadiel

The Bad Boy: The Most Wanted Edition - Héctor el Father

- Disc:2 /05. Mensaje De Voz Ft. Naldo

Wisin vs. Yandel: Los Extraterrestres - Wisin & Yandel

- 07. Dime Quiénes Son (produced with Victor "El Nasi" and Nesty)

The Black Carpet - Nicky Jam

- Gas Pela Ft. RKM

=== 2008 ===
Lo Mejor De Mi - Jadiel

- 07. Sol & Arena Pt.2
- 17. Calentamiento Ft. Franco "El Gorila"

El Fenomeno - Arcangel

- 08. I Got Flow

Ivy Queen 2008 World Tour LIVE!

- 01. "Dime"
- 02. "Que Lloren" (Live)
- 07. "Reza Por Mi" (Live)
- 18. "Dime" (Bachata Version)

=== 2009 ===
El Patron - Tito El Bambino

- 01. "El Amor"
- 02. "Suéltate"
- 03. "Mata"
- 04. "Desnudarte"
- 05. "Mi Cama Huele a Ti" (Feat. Zion & Lennox)
- 06. "Piropo"
- 07. "Baila Sexy"
- 08. "Perfumate"
- 09. "Te Comencé a Querer"
- 10. "Agárrala" (Feat. Plan B)
- 11. "Te Extraño"
- 12. "Under"
- 13. "Se Me Daña La Mente"
- 14. "Somos Iguales"

Down to Earth - Alexis & Fido

- 08. Súbete (Official Remix) (Feat. Don Omar) (produced by Urba with Tainy, Doble A & Nales and Master Chris)

Welcome to the Jungle - Franco "El Gorila"

- 08. Psiquiatrica Loca (produced by Monserrrate with Sosa)

El Momento - Jowell & Randy

- Amanecer (feat. Yandel & Gadiel) (produced by Monserrrate with Tainy and Marioso)

=== 2010 ===
Drama Queen Deluxe Edition

- 15. Dime
