= Nostra (band) =

French-Latvian post-rock and post-metal band

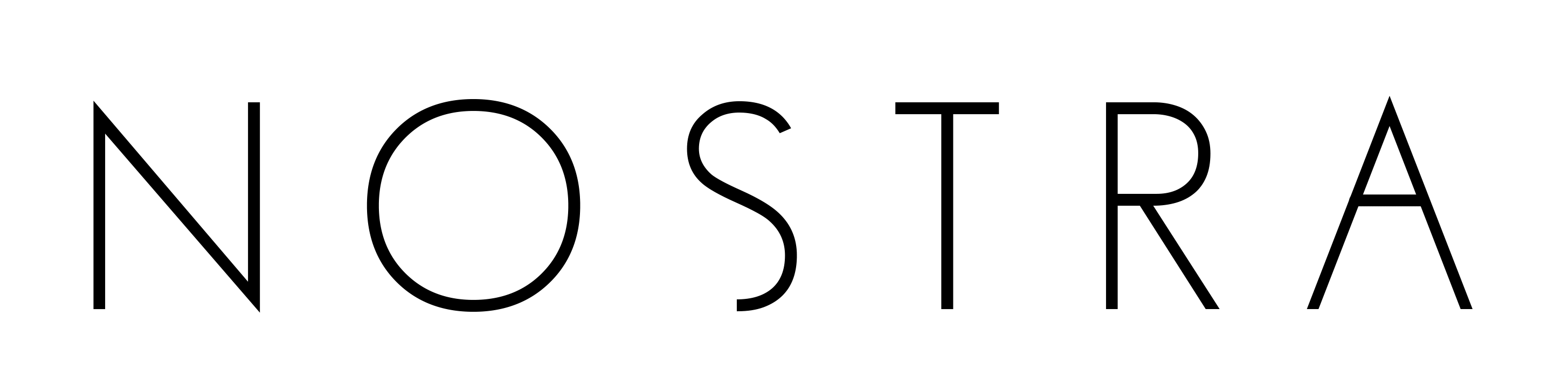

Background information
- Origin: Riga, Latvia
- Genres: post-rock post-metal
- Years active: 2016-present
- Members: Harijs Ijabs; Xavier Landes; Lauris Polis
- Past members: Einars Kotāns

Nostra is a French-Latvian post-rock and post-metal band founded in 2016 in Riga, Latvia.

Nostra's music is inspired both by post-Soviet cityscapes as well as by nature reclaiming them. Artistic influences are also visible, whether it is the writers Yukio Mishima (The Sea of Fertility) and Robert W. Chambers (The King in Yellow) or the movie director Andrei Tarkovsky (Stalker).

Nostra released their first EP Transmission(s) in 2018. The buzzer of the Russian ghost radio station UVB-76 can be heard in there. In 2019, Nostra released their first album, Nemoralis, and won the competition for young music bands and performers Hadrons. In 2020, the band released their second EP Law of the Tongue and won the Alternative.lv Music Award as The Best New Band. The second album, Sea of Fertility, was released in 2023. It was mastered at Grey Market Mastering by Harris Newman who has worked with Crystal Castles, Wolf Parade, Tindersticks, Godspeed You! Black Emperor. The cover was designed by Latvian artist Atis Jākobsons.

Sea of Fertility was awarded Best Alternative, Experimental and Post-Metal Album for the Year 2023 at the Latvian Metal Awards Ceremony. The band was also nominated for the main Latvian music award Zelta Mikrofons (Golden Microphone) in the category of The Best Rock or Metal Album.

Nostra regularly performs in concerts with other Latvian bands, but also foreign ones (such as Shy, Low or The Foreign Resort).

== Discography ==
- Transmission(s) (EP) (2018)
- Nemoralis (LP) (2019)
- Law of the Tongue (EP) (2020)
- Sea of Fertility (LP) (2023)
- Live at Gateris (EP) (2024)

== Videos ==
- Delta (2023)
