= 2008 World Tour Live! =

2008 World Tour Live! –– Coliseo de Puerto Rico

Live album / Compilation album by Ivy Queen
- Released: August 12, 2008
- Recorded: November 30, 2007
- Studios: José Miguel Agrelot Coliseum (San Juan, Puerto Rico)
- Genres: Reggaetón, hip Hop, latin pop
- Length: 1:18:31
- Label: Machete Music
- Producers: Luny Tunes, DJ Nelson, Tainy, Nesty "La Mente Maestra", Doble A & Nales "Los Presidentes", Monserrate & DJ Urba, Iván Joy, Noriega, Ednita Nazario, Draco Rosa, Swizz Beatz, Marcos Sánchez, Rafi Mercenario, Mr. G, Miguel "Escobar" Marquez, Carlos "Chaveta" Torres, Victor "El Nasi", Marioso, Tony "CD" Kelly

Ivy Queen chronology
Sentimiento (2007)	2008 World Tour Live! –– Coliseo de Puerto Rico (2008)	Drama Queen (2010)

Singles from 2008 World Tour Live!
- 1. "Dime" Released: August 2008

Alternate cover art
- DVD cover

2008 World Tour LIVE! –– Coliseo de Puerto Rico is the first live compilation album from Puerto Rican singer-songwriter Ivy Queen, released on August 12, 2008 in a two-disc box set. Disc one being a CD and disc two being a DVD. It featured performances by Queen along with Ken-Y, Divino, Jadiel, La Sista and Wisin & Yandel.

The album peaked at number seventy-two on the Billboard Latin Albums chart and number seven on the Billboard Latin Rhythm Albums chart. The album produced one single, a studio track entitled "Dime", which peaked at number eight on the Billboard Latin Songs chart, number four on the Billboard Tropical Songs chart and number one on the Billboard Latin Rhythm Songs chart.

Songs performed on the set list of the concert included repertoire from her most recent studio album, Sentimiento, (2007) as well as Diva (2003), Real (2004), Flashback (2005).

== Background ==
After the success of her 2007 effort Sentimiento, which would be certified Platinum by the United States Recording Industry Association of America (RIAA), Ivy Queen embarked on recording a live album at the José Miguel Agrelot Coliseum, the biggest indoor arena dedicated to entertainment in Puerto Rico. The live album, later known as Ivy Queen 2008 World Tour LIVE!, feature performances of songs from previously released albums including Diva (2003), Real (2004), Flashback (2005) and Sentimiento.

It included two studio tracks, which were both serviced to radio. These two were "Dime" and its respective bachata version. It was featured on the album as the intro and closing tracks and was not performed on the setlist of the tour; According to Queen, she and her management decided to include it on the album as a "gift". It was selected as the second most notable release for the week of August 12, 2008 behind Daddy Yankee's Talento De Barrio by Tijana Ilich of About.com.

== Composition ==
=== Song structure and lyrical content ===
"Dime" is a blend of reggaetón and bachata known as bachaton or bachateo, a musical movement in the Dominican Republic and Puerto Rico which combines bachata melodies and reggaeton style beats, lyrics, rapping, and disc jockeying. Ivy Queen described the song as being "a sentimiental subject where we fused bachata and urban rhythms. While reviewing the song "Peligro de Extinción", Jonathan Bogart called "Dime" the "prettiest single" Ivy Queen had ever released. "Que Lloren" has been described as being "hectic", "frenzied" and "hardcore reggaeton". It features minor key tonality, bowed strings, a string ensemble and elements of techno music. The song's lyrics show a woman's view of romance and the stereotype that men shouldn't show emotions. "Libertad", being was composed in minor key, features danceable grooves, synthetic instrumentation and synthesizers as she takes influences from Afro-Latin music. Queen appears infuriated in the lyrics where she asks a former lover "who the hell am I so that you may play with my heart. This has finished. Go look for another idiotic stupid woman. I'm going to the club with a miniskirt to celebrate my freedom." "En Que Fallamos" is another "hardcore reggaeton" song. Ivy Queen described the song as being what happened to her when a relationship ended. She said it is very "honest and straightforward "explaining that she wanted to "show people the stormy times that I lived." Ivy Queen worked with Puerto Rican rapper Ken-Y, one half of the reggaeton duo R.K.M & Ken-Y on the "romantic" remix to the song.

"Papi Te Quiero" was composed by Ivy Queen herself. It was produced by Tony "CD" Kelly and Rafi Mercenario. This was the start of a musical relationship between Queen and Mercenario, who later produced Ivy Queen's biggest hits including "Chika Ideal", "Cuéntale" and "Libertad". The song samples Sean Paul's "Like Glue" which in turn samples T.O.K.'s "Money 2 Burn". The original version of the song blends reggaeton with the beat of "Like Glue", however the English version features the same beat as "Like Glue". On digital editions of the album, Anthony Kelly, co-writer of "Like Glue", is credited as being featured on the song, though, provides no vocals. An example of this can be seen on Rihanna's "We Found Love" where Calvin Harris is credited as being on the song but provides no vocals. "Papi Te Quiero", named one of the album's biggest hits, "pairs a straightforward love song with the well known Reggae riddim Buyout." Ramiro Burr of Billboard stated "Papi Te Quiero" shows "how effortlessly and quickly she alternately sings and raps" while claiming that she has a "distinct vocal style that evokes Gwen Stefani". Although the literal translation of "Papi Te Quiero" is "Daddy I Love You", the song is not directed towards Queen's father but more to her love interest; "Papi" in Hispanic-speaking countries can also mean "babe" or "baby". "Pobre Corazón" was composed by Daniel Vazquez known by his stage name as Divino alongside Ivy Queen. Production was handled by Marcos Sánchez while Queen served as executive producer. Lyrically, the balad, touches familiar themes such as "devotion, heart-break, hope and reconciliation". "Sentimientos", the title track, was written by Ivy Queen herself. The song was recorded at Marroneo Studios in Bayamón, Puerto Rico along with "Indecisiones" and "En Que Fallamos" from the album. It is also a bachaton track. It features minor key tonality, mixed acoustic and electric instrumentation, bowed strings, a string ensemble, and ambient synthesizers. Ivy Queen indicated that the song emphasized human connection over material things, stating that "What I wanted to say in the song is that material things have never been important to me.... I look for genuine feelings, honesty, the things that come from the heart, because the material things I can get." In another interview, she identified the song as the one that best represented her at that time, explaining, "if you think you can only conquer me if you're famous, rich and have an expensive car, you're wrong, because I'm a woman who needs affection, someone to open the door for me, to bring me flowers and sing to me."

"Quiero Bailar" was written by Ivy Queen. It was produced by the Puerto Rican reggaetón producer Iván Joy. Originally featured on Iván Joy's reggaetón compilation album, The Majestic (2002), the song was also later included on Queen's fifth studio album, Flashback (2005) and second compilation album, Reggaeton Queen (2006) and first EP, e5 (2006). The song incorporates the Liquid riddim, a musical riddim produced by the "Jamaican cross-over guru" Jeremy Harding. The song's lyrics warn her dance partner not to misinterpret her moves. In the song, she berates a lover who thinks that just because they dance she is automatically going to bed with him. Jonathan Widran of AllMusic described the track as a song that "gets the party and people moving" and as well as being one of Ivy Queen's hits. Kid Curry, PD of Rhythmic Top 40 WPOW (Power 96) cites Ivy Queen's release of "Yo Quiero Bailar" as "the last reggaetón super-hit". "Te He Querido, Te He Llorado" is the third bachaton track on the album. Ivy Queen uses "bachata's signature guitar sound" and "slower more romantic rhythm" while incorporating "bachata's exaggerated emotional singing style" in this song as well as in "La Mala". It features major key tonality, simple harmonic progressions, "angry-romantic" lyrics, Puerto Rican and Caribbean roots and Afro-Latin as well as Caribbean influences according to the Music Genome Project. According to Jesus Trivino of Latina magazine, "Te He Querido, Te He Llorado" is the best song released by Queen during "Reggaetón's Golden Era" which lasted from 2003 until 2007.

== Track listing ==
Disc 1

No.	Title	Writer(s)	Producer(s)	Length
1.	"Dime" (Album Version)	Martha Pesante, Alex Monserrate, Urbani Mota	Monserrate & DJ Urba	3:42
2.	"Que Lloren" (Live)	Pesante, Monserrate, Mota	Monserrate & DJ Urba	3:33
3.	"Libertad" (Live)	Pesante	Rafi Mercenario	3:55
4.	"En Que Fallamos" (Live Remix Featuring Ken-Y)	Pesante, Kenny Vazquez	Rafi Mercenario	3:25
5.	"Corazón Anestesiado" (Live)	Pesante, Miguel Soto	Carlos Torres	3:35
6.	"Papi Te Quiero" / "Dat Sexy Body" / "Quiero Saber" / "Never Leave You (Uh Oooh, Uh Oooh)" (Medley) (Live)	Pesante, Omar Navarro, Karen Chin, Anthony Kelly, Lumidee Cedeño, Teddy Mendez, Edwin Perez, Steven Marsden, Trevor Smith, John Jackson	Tony "CD" Kelly, DJ Tedsmooth, Trendsetta	4:37
7.	"Reza Por Mi" (Live)	Pesante	Monserrate & DJ Urba	7:08
8.	"Se Desvive Por Ella" (Live Remix Featuring Jadiel And La Sista)	Pesante, Maidel Canales,	Walde, Noriega	5:00
9.	"Soldados" (Live)	Pesante	Swizz Beatz	4:22
10.	"Más Grande Que Grande" (Live)	Luis Gómez, Draco Rosa	Ednita Nazario, Draco Rosa	5:25
11.	"Dime Si Recuerdas" (Live)	Pesante, Norgie Noriega	Luny Tunes, Noriega	5:05
12.	"Pobre Corazón" (Live Remix With Divino)	Pesante, Daniel Vazquez	Marcos Sánchez	4:39
13.	"Sentimientos" (Live)	Pesante	Rafi Mercenario	3:07
14.	"Noche De Entierro (Nuestro Amor)" (Live Remix With Wisin & Yandel)	Francisco Saldaña, Víctor Cabrera, Juan Luis Morera Luna, Llandel Veguilla Malavé, Héctor Delgado, Raymond Ayala, Gabriel Antonio Cruz Padilla, Elvis Garcia, Pesante	Luny Tunes, Tainy, Doble A & Nales, Mr. G	3:28
15.	"Sexy Movimiento" (Live Performance By Wisin & Yandel)	Victor Martinez, Malavé, Morera, Padilla	Nesty "La Mente Maestra", Victor "El Nasi", Marioso	3:03
16.	"Yo Quiero Bailar" (Live)	Pesante, Navarro	Iván Joy, Jeremy Harding	3:11
17.	"Te He Querido, Te He Llorado" (Live)	Pesante, Saldaná, Padilla	Luny Tunes	7:48
18.	"Dime" (Bachata Version)	Pesante, Sosa, Cedeno	Monserrate & DJ Urba	3:43
Total length:				1:18:32

=== Notes ===
- The track "Dime" which appears as track eighteen was the version of the song that was serviced to radio.

== Personnel ==
Adapted from the album's liner notes.

Technical

- General Director: Liz Imperio & Chad Carlbert
- Camera Director: Eric Delgado
- Cameras: Freddie Hernandez, Edgar Colon, Carlos Marrero, Juan Nadal, Robert Méndez
- P2 Technicians: Hector Santos
- Editor: Heriberto Diaz
- Mixing Engineer: Arnaldo Santo “Naldo” & Miguel Pequero
- Production Manager: Otiz Negron
- Stage Manager: Robert Santiago
- Sound: Comco Audio
- Sound Engineer Monitors: Ryan Vargas
- Sound Engineer FOH: Manuel Comulada
- Lights: Robert Machado
- Lighting Designer: Robert Machado
- Lighting Programmer: Carlos Rivera
- Video Graphics Designer: Holy Chen
- Video Engineer: Pedro Santiago
- Pyros: Musique Express
- Pyros Tech: Richard Nuñez

Musical

- Musical Director: Miguel Márquez “Escobar”
- Acoustic Guitar “Corazón Anestesiado”: Carlos “Chaveta” Torres
- Bass: José Aponte
- Guitar: Juan C. Rodríguez
- Keyboards: Andres Arroyo “Zoprano”
- Drums: Antonio Alonso “Papito”
- Percussion: Omar Soto “Pooh”
- Güira: Lionel Rodríguez “Leo”
- Chorus 1: Julio Cartagena “Corbata”
- Chorus 2: Zulma Oviedo
- Chorus 3: Orlando Rosario “Orlandito”
- Band Boy: Carmelo Faria “Tete”
- DJ: David Montañez “DJ Davey”

Performance

- Choreographers: Liz Imperio, Jesse Santos & Naydimar Ortiz
- Dancer 1: Naydimar Ortiz Concepcion
- Dancer 2: Lucia Santiago Guzmán
- Dancer 3: Lorainne Rodríguez Rosa
- Dancer 4: Juliecelys Melendez Lopez
- Dancer 5: Mayrelis Cordero Muriel
- Dancer 6: Tania Medina Bernier
- Dancer 7: José Martinez Suarez
- Dancer 8: Nelson Figueroa Rosa
- Dancer 9: Egardo Cotto Rosa
- Dancer 10: Roberto Rivera Rodríguez
- Dancer 11: Reginald Lebron Camacho
- Dancer 12: Giancarlo Ramirez Martinez
- B-Boy Dancer 1: Alex Cruz
- B-Boy Dancer 2: Angel Rodríguez
- B-Boy Dancer 3: Omar Martínez
- B-Boy Dancer 4: Nathael Vélez
- B-Boy Dancer 5: José Marques
- B-Boy Dancer 6: José Marrero
- B-Boy Dancer 7: Jaime Espinal
- B-Boy Dancer 8: Luis Rosado

Misc

- Show Designer: Liz Imperio
- Stylist: Luis Antonio
- Hair and Make-up: Felix Hernandez
- Invited Guest: Ken-Y, Jadiel, La Sista, Divino, and Wisin & Yandel

== Charts ==
Chart (2008)	Peak Position
US Latin Albums (Billboard)	72
US Latin Rhythm Albums (Billboard)	7
