= Pobre Corazón =

Song by Divino

from the album Sentimiento and Por Expierencias Propias
- Recorded: 2007
- Genre: Latin pop, salsa
- Length: 3:59
- Label: Univision, Drama, MVP
- Songwriter(s): Daniel Vazquez, Martha Pesante
- Producer(s): Marcos Sánchez

"Pobre Corazón" (English: Poor Heart) is a song recorded by Divino for Ivy Queen's sixth studio album, Sentimiento (2007). It was composed by Divino along with Queen and produced by Marcos Sánchez. A remix version with Queen was also recorded and included on the platinum edition of the album. Separate salsa and bachata versions were also later recorded. Ivy Queen and Divino performed the remix of the song as a part of the setlist of her 2008 World Tour which was held from the José Miguel Agrelot Coliseum known as the Coliseum of Puerto Rico in San Juan, Puerto Rico. Charting on five Billboard charts, the song reached #24 on the Latin Pop Airplay chart.

== Background ==
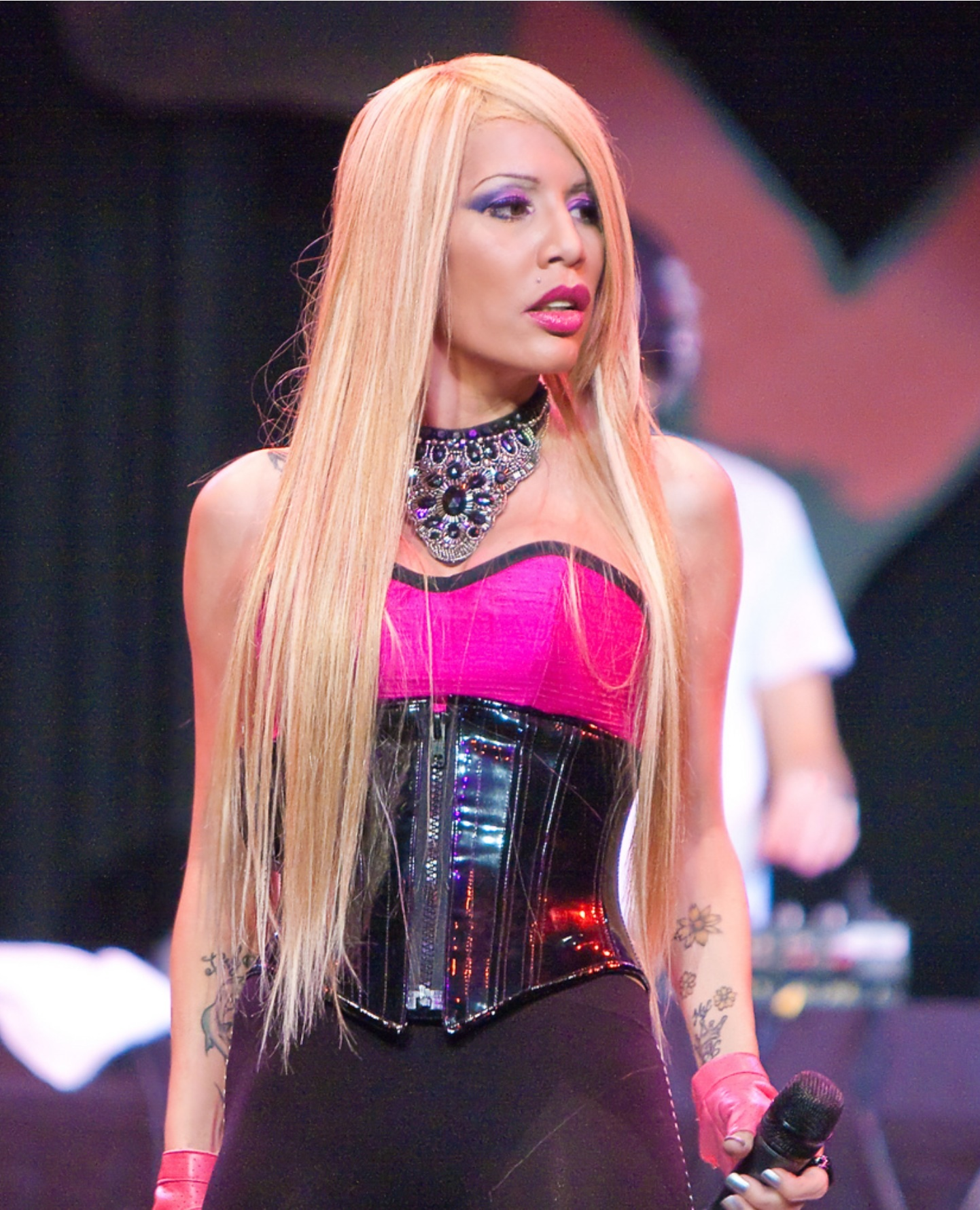
Ivy Queen in 2010

Ivy Queen began working on her sixth studio album in 2006. On the album, entitled Sentimiento as a part of her evolution in reggaetón, she includes "solo turns", instead of duets by guest artist. This includes "Pobre Corazón". Others include "Manaña Al Despertar" by Baby Rasta and Noriega where the artist performed songs without vocals by Ivy Queen. She said she wanted to give a 180-degree turn to what people think of reggaetón. She explained "Many think reggaetón is just nice rhythms to dance to. And they forget there are song-writers and composers, who, like everyone else, also suffer and aspire in love". She wanted the album to be about that. She said "Love is what makes us write things, what keeps us alive. If we did not have love, we would have nothing". After the commercial success of the album, which was certified Platinum by the United States Recording Industry Association of America (RIAA), a platinum edition and substantial live album was distributed by Univision and Machete in late-2007 and 2008 respectively. Of the seven new tracks on the platinum edition was a remix of "Pobre Corazón" with Ivy Queen among others.

== Composition and cover versions ==
"Pobre Corazón" was composed by Daniel Vazquez known by his stage name as Divino alongside Ivy Queen. Production was handled by Marcos Sánchez while Queen served as executive producer. Lyrically, the balad, touches familiar themes such as "devotion, heart-break, hope and reconciliation". The song was later included on Divino's third studio album Por Expierencias Propias (2010) rerecorded in salsa. A bachata version with bachata trio Marcy Place was also recorded. It was covered in bachata by Dominican singer Leny on the compilation album Bachata #1's, Vol. 2 in 2008. It originally appeared on his debut full-length solo studio album One (2008).

== Release and chart performance ==
On the Billboard Hot Latin Tracks chart, "Pobre Corazón" debuted for the issue week of August 11, 2007 and peaked at #45 the week of August 25, 2007. On the Billboard Latin Pop Airplay chart, the song debuted for the week of August 11, 2007 and reached its peak position #24 for the week of August 25, 2007. On the Billboard Latin Rhythm Airplay chart, the song debuted and peaked at #37 for the week of August 11, 2007. On the Billboard Latin Tropical Airplay chart, "Pobre Corazón" debuted and peaked at #36 for the issue week of December 15, 2007.

== Charts ==
Chart (2007)	Peak Position
US Latin Songs (Billboard)	45
US Latin Pop Airplay (Billboard)	24
US Latin Rhythm Airplay (Billboard)	37
US Latin Tropical Airplay (Billboard)	36

== Credits and personnel ==
- Album Version
  - "Pobre Corazon" 3:58 — (Onivid Music Publishing)
  - Interpreter/Composer: Daniel Veláquez/Martha Pesante
  - Executive Production: Ivy Queen
  - Musical Production: Marcos Sánchez
  - Mastering: Esteban Piñero
- Remix Version
  - "Pobre Corazon" - Remix 3:58 New! — (Onivid Music Publishing)
  - Divino featuring Ivy Queen
  - Interpreter/Composer: Daniel Veláquez/Martha Pesante
  - Executive Production: Ivy Queen
  - Musical Production: Marcos Sánchez
  - Mastering: Esteban Piñero
- Live Version
  - Mixing Engineer: Arnaldo Santo "Naldo" & Miguel Pequero
  - Musical Director: Miguel Márquez "Escobar"
  - Bass: José Aponte
  - Guitar: Juan C. Rodríguez
  - Keyboards: Andres Arroyo "Zoprano"
  - Drums: Antonio Alonso "Papito"
  - Percussion: Omar Soto "Pooh
  - Chorus 1: Julio Cartagena "Corbata"
  - Chorus 2: Zulma Oviedo
  - Chorus 3: Orlando Rosario "Orlandito"
  - DJ: David Montañez "DJ Davey"
  - Sound: Comco Audio
  - Sound Engineer Monitors: Ryan Vargas
  - Sound Engineer FOH: Manuel Comulada
