= Que Lloren =

Single by Ivy Queen

from the album Sentimiento
- Released: 6 March 2007
- Recorded: 2006–2007; Los Yedais Recording Studio (San Juan, Puerto Rico)
- Genre: Reggaeton
- Length: 3:13
- Label: Univision
- Songwriters: Martha Pesante, Alex Monserrate, Cedeno Mota
- Producer: Monserrate & DJ Urba

Ivy Queen singles chronology
"No Hacen Na" (2006)	"Que Lloren" (2007)	"En Que Fallamos" (2007)

Audio sample
- An 18 second sample of bridge and chorus of the lead single "Que Lloren".: file; help

"Que Lloren" (English: Let Them Cry) is a song by Puerto Rican reggaetón recording artist Ivy Queen, from her sixth studio album, Sentimiento (2007). It was composed by Queen, produced by Monserrate & DJ Urba, and released as the lead single off the album in January 2007. Lyrically, the song degrades the stereotype that men shouldn't cry and they are weak if they show emotions. The song gained positive to mixed reviews from critics, reaching the Top 10 of the Billboard Hot Latin Songs, Latin Rhythm Airplay, and Latin Tropical Airplay charts. A remix version with Tito "El Bambino", Naldo and Arcángel was also recorded and featured on the platinum edition of the album, after Sentimiento was certified Platinum by the Recording Industry Association of America (RIAA) on May 10, 2007, two months after the standard edition was released. Ivy Queen performed the song at Latin Grammy Awards of 2007. It was included on the set of her 2008 World Tour which was held from the José Miguel Agrelot Coliseum known as the Coliseum of Puerto Rico in San Juan, Puerto Rico. The song's accompanying music video was filmed in Downtown Miami, Florida. It was directed by Marlon Peña.

== Background ==
Following the success of Queen's fifth studio album in 2005 in the Latin market, she began working on her sixth studio album in 2006. She wanted to create a new album with more slower and romantic reggaetón. This stemmed from Queen divorcing her husband of nine years and releasing all of her anger on Flashback. Not wanting to go into detail, she "acknowledged the songs were just one way she dealt with the end of an 11-year relationship". On the album, as a part of her evolution in reggaetón, she includes "solo turns", instead of duets by guest artist. Of the solo tracks on the album is "Pobre Corazón" by Divino while others include "Manaña Al Despertar" by Baby Rasta and Noriega where the artist performed songs without vocals by Ivy Queen. She said she wanted to give a 180-degree turn to what people think of reggaetón. She explained "Many think reggaetón is just nice rhythms to dance to. And they forget there are song-writers and composers, who, like everyone else, also suffer and aspire in love". She wanted the album to be about that. She said "Love is what makes us write things, what keeps us alive. If we did not have love, we would have nothing".

== Composition ==
"Que Lloren" was written by Ivy Queen herself. It was produced and co-written by Queen's then boyfriend, DJ Urba, whom she broke up with on good terms before the album was released along with Monserrate, known collectively as Monserrate & DJ Urba. It was recorded at Los Yedais Recording Studio in Caguas, Puerto Rico along with the songs "Reza Por Mi", "Yo Te Rescaté" and the remix of "Que Lloren" from the album. The song has been described as being "hectic", "frenzied" and "hardcore reggaeton". It features minor key tonality, bowed strings, a string ensemble and elements of techno music. The song's lyrics show a woman's view of romance and the stereotype that men shouldn't show emotions.

== Release and chart performance ==
"Que Lloren" was released on March 6, 2007 as the lead single off the album by Univision Records followed by En Que Fallamos and Sentimientos. On the Billboard Hot Latin Songs chart, the song debuted at #24 for the week of February 24, 2007 being labeled as "Hot Shot Debut", and peaked at #10 for the week of May 12, 2007. On the Billboard Latin Rhythm Airplay chart, the song debuted at #9 the same week of February 24, 2007 and peaked at #2 for the week of May 12, 2007. The remix of "Impacto" by Daddy Yankee featuring Fergie (singer) kept "Que Lloren" from reaching the #1 spot. On the Billboard Tropical Songs chart, the song debuted at #19 for the week of March 3, 2007 and peaked at #4 for the week of May 12, 2007. On the Billboard Hot Dance Club Play chart, the song debuted at #38 on the week of June 2, 2007 and peaked at #20 for the week of July 7, 2007 becoming her highest debut and peak on that chart to date.

== Critical reception ==
Mike Stier of About.com gave the song a 4 out of 5 stars and commented that "She has truly left her mark on the reggaeton world and now is expanding her reach with the song "Que Lloren". He praised the dance remixes by Ralphi Rosario, applauding the "pumping rhythm and percussion". He also said "Ivy's Spanish vocals may be lost on some punters, but that should not keep you from running out and twirling to this. Around the four-minute mark, the synth line comes in to add even more spice to the track. The beats stay consistent and steady with no big variations one way or another". Overall he commented that "Her vocals are on point and Ralphi Rosario & Norty Cotto provide beats that never take away from that. A great song and a nice change of pace from the wailing dance divas that usually flood dance floors". While reviewing the parent album, an editor from Allmusic noted how Queen was "one of the only female artists in reggaeton," and later claimed her "husky voice" to be "well-suited to the style's catchy melodies and hard-hitting beats, as evinced on the frenetic lead single "Que Lloren."

== Track listing ==
- CD Single

No.	Title	Writer(s)	Producer(s)	Length
1.	"Que Lloren" (Album version)	Martha I. Pesante	Monserrate & DJ Urba	3:14
Total length:				3:14

CD Single - The Remixes
No.	Title	Writer(s)	Producer(s)	Length
1.	"Que Lloren" (Album version)	Martha I. Pesante	Monserrate & DJ Urba	3:14
2.	"Que Lloren" (Ralphi Rosario's Vocal Mix)	Martha I. Pesante	Ralphi Rosario	9:17
3.	"Que Lloren" (Ralphi Rosario's Radio Edit)	Martha I. Pesante	Ralphi Rosario	3:43
4.	"Que Lloren" (Cotto's N.Y. Reggaeton Mix)	Martha I. Pesante	Norty Cotto	3:24
5.	"Que Lloren" (Cotto's N.Y. Reggaeton Instrumental)	Martha I. Pesante	Norty Cotto	3:24
Total length:				23:01

== Music video ==
Ivy Queen in the music video for the song "Que Lloren". In this scene, Queen interrupts a meeting between men for male empowerment were the theme is "Men Do Not Cry!"

The music video of "Que Lloren" was filmed in Downtown Miami in March 2007 and priemiered March 21, 2007 on the television show "Primer Impacto" on the Univision channel. It featured cameos by actors from the telenovela, La Fea Más Bella: Niurka Marcos and Sergio Mayer. and mexican singer and actress Anahi. Direction was handled by Dominican-born Marlon Peña who also directed the music video for her 2005 smash-hit "Te He Querido, Te He Llorado". This would lead up to him directing every music video by Queen after this one, except for "En Que Fallamos" which was filmed in Mexico City, Mexico with direction being handled by Ron Jaramillo.

== Accolades ==
=== Billboard Latin Music Awards ===
The Billboard Latin Music Awards are awarded annually by Billboard magazine in the United States. "Que Lloren" was nominated for "Latin Dance Club Play Track of the Year", which was ultimately won by Kat De Luna and her #1 single "Whine Up" at the 2008 Latin Billboard Music Awards where she was also nominated for "Reggaeton Album of the Year" for the song's parent album Sentimiento for a third time after Diva: Platinum Edition in 2005 and Flashback in 2006.

Year	Nominee / work	Award	Result
2008	"Que Lloren"	Latin Dance Club Play Track of the Year	Nominated

=== La Musa Awards ===
The Premios La Musa awards are awarded annually by in the United States. Queen was nominated to the Latin Songwriters Hall of Fame in 2017 and was later inducted in 2019.

Year	Nominee / work	Award	Result
2017	Herself: "Quiero Bailar"; "Que Lloren"; "La Vida es Así"	Latin Songwriters Hall of Fame	Nominated
2019	Herself: "Quiero Bailar"; "Que Lloren"; "La Vida es Así"	Latin Songwriters Hall of Fame	Won

== Charts ==
=== Weekly charts ===
Chart (2007)	Peak Position
US Latin Songs (Billboard)	10
US Latin Rhythm Airplay (Billboard)	2
US Latin Rhythm Digital Songs (Billboard)	2
US Latin Tropical Airplay (Billboard)	4
US Latin Recurrent Airplay (Billboard)	7
US Hot Dance Club Play Songs (Billboard)	20

=== Year-end charts ===
Chart (2007)	Position
US Latin Songs (Billboard)	47
US Tropical Songs (Billboard)	37
US Latin Rhythm Songs (Billboard)	16
