= Bachatón =

Hybrid bachata/reggaeton music style

- Stylistic origins: Bachata; reggaeton
- Cultural origins: Puerto Rico; Dominican Republic
- Typical instruments: Dem Bow; sampling; drum machine; guitar; electric guitar; requinto guitar; bass guitar; güira; bongos; vocals (rapping, singing)

Regional scenes
- United States; Puerto Rico; Dominican Republic; Panama; Cuba; Colombia; Venezuela; Spain; Mexico; Portugal; Brazil

Other topics
- Music of Puerto Rico

Bachatón (also known as bachateo) is a fusion genre of reggaeton from Puerto Rico as well as bachata from the Dominican Republic. Bachaton combines bachata melodies and reggaeton style beats, lyrics, rapping, and disc jockeying. The word "bachatón" is a portmanteau of "bachata" and "reggaeton". "Bachatón" was coined and widely accepted in 2005. It is a subgenre of reggaeton and bachata.

== Background ==
Bachatón is a mix of bachata and reggaetón. The histories of the two genres are described below.

=== Bachata ===
Bachata is a genre of music that originated in the Dominican Republic in the early parts of the 20th century and spread to other parts of Latin America and Mediterranean Europe. It became popular in the countryside and the rural neighborhoods of the Dominican Republic. Its subjects are often romantic; especially prevalent are tales of heartbreak and sadness. In fact, the original term used to name the genre was amargue ("bitterness" or "bitter music"), until the rather ambiguous (and mood-neutral) term bachata became popular. The form of dance, bachata, also developed with the music. The earliest bachata was originally developed in the Dominican Republic around the early part of the 20th century, with mixed Cuban boleros which originated from Son with African elements, and Puerto Rican 18th century jibaro music combined with traditional Latin/Caribbean rhythms. During much of its history, bachata music was denigrated by Latino/Caribbean society and associated with rural backwardness and delinquency. The typical bachata group consists of five instruments: lead guitar, rhythm guitar, electric bass guitar, bongos and güira. The rhythm guitar is also known as a segunda and serves the purpose of adding syncopation to the music. Bachata groups mainly play a simple style of bolero (lead guitar instrumentation using arpeggiated repetitive chords is a distinctive characteristic of bachata), but when they change to merengue based bachata, the percussionist will switch from bongo to a tambora drum. In the 1960s and 1970s, maracas were used instead of güira. The change in the 1980s from maracas to the more versatile güira was made as bachata was becoming more dance oriented.

=== Reggaetón ===
Reggaetón is an urban form of music which has its roots in Latin and Caribbean music. Its sound derives from the Reggae en Español from Panama. The genre was invented, shaped and made known in Puerto Rico where it got its name; most of its current artists are also from Puerto Rico. After its mainstream exposure in 2004, it spread to North American, European, Asian and African audiences. Reggaeton blends Jamaican musical influences of dancehall, with those of Latin America, such as salsa, bomba, Latin hip hop, and electronica. Vocals include rapping and singing, typically in Spanish. Lyrics tend to be derived from hip hop rather than from dancehall. Like hip hop, reggaeton has caused some controversy, albeit less, due to alleged exploitation of women. While it takes influences from hip hop and Jamaican dancehall, reggaeton is not precisely the Hispanic or Latin American version of either of these genres; reggaeton has its own specific beat and rhythm, whereas Latin hip hop is simply hip hop recorded by artists of Latino descent. The specific "riddim" that characterizes reggaeton is referred to as "Dem Bow". The name is taken from the dancehall song by Shabba Ranks that first popularized the beat in the early 1990s which appears on his album Just Reality.

== History ==
=== 2000–2003: The arrival of Dominican styles of music ===
The appearance of Dominican styles of music such as bachata and merengue in reggaetón coincided with the arrival in Puerto Rico of the Dominican-born production team of Luny Tunes—although they are not solely credited for this development, they were indeed heavily influenced by the already popular reggaeton genre to begin their own production company. In 2000, they received an opportunity to work in the reggaeton studio of DJ Nelson. They began to produce a string of successful releases for reggaeton artists including Ivy Queen, Tego Calderón and Daddy Yankee. "Pa' Que Retozen", one of the first songs to combine bachata and reggaeton appeared on Tego Calderón's highly acclaimed El Abayarde (2002). It features the unmistakable guitar sounds of Dominican bachata—although, it was not produced by Luny Tunes but by DJ Joe. Luny Tunes however, on their debut studio album, Mas Flow (2003) included a hit by Calderón, "Métele Sazón". It exhibited bachata's signature guitar arpeggios as well as merengue's characteristic piano riffs.

=== 2004–Present: "Bachatón" ===
After the success of these songs, other artists began to incorporate bachata with reggaeton. Artists such as Ivy Queen began releasing singles that featured bachata's signature guitar sound and slower romantic rhythm as well as bachata's exaggerate emotional singing style. This is reflected in the hits "Te He Querido, Te He Llorado" and "La Mala". Daddy Yankee's "Lo Que Paso, Paso" and Don Omar's "Dile" also reflect this. A further use of bachata occurred in 2005 when producers began remixing existing reggaeton with bachata's characteristic guitar sounds marketing it as bachatón defining it as "bachata, Puerto Rican style".
