= Univision Music Group =

Record label

- Founded: 2001; United States
- Founder: Univision Communications
- Defunct: 2008
- Headquarters: United States
- Parent: Univision Communications

Univision Music Group was a Latin music company in the United States. Founded in April 2001 by Univision Communications, the Univision Music Group included three record labels: Univision Records, Fonovisa Records and Disa Records. In June 2001, Univision Music acquired a 50% interest in Mexico-based Disa Records, the second largest independent Spanish language record label in the world, and Mexico's leading independent label. More recently in April 2002, Univision acquired Fonovisa, the largest Latin independent label specializing in Regional Mexican music.

Its headquarters were located in Woodland Hills, Los Angeles, California; the company had planned to move its headquarters to Woodland Hills in 2002. Univision Music Group also had an extensive and growing publishing business as well as an exclusive distribution and licensing agreement with Universal Music & Video Distribution for several of its labels in the U.S., Puerto Rico and Mexico. The music group was bought by Universal Music Group in February 2008 and absorbed into Universal Music Latin Entertainment.

== Labels ==
=== Univision Records (2001-2008) ===
Launched mid 2001.

- In 2003, Jennifer Peña became the only female artist nominated for a Grammy in the "Best Mexican/Mexican-American Album"

=== Fonovisa Records ===
Acquired in 2002, Fonovisa is the largest Regional Mexican label in the music industry and since 1984 has launched major Latin stars into international markets and mainstream America.

- Fonovisa's impressive roster of over 120 artists include multi-platinum artists Marco Antonio Solís, La Banda el Recodo, Conjunto Primavera, Ana Bárbara, Los Temerarios, and the legendary Los Tigres del Norte.

In 2009 Fonovisa Records celebrates its 25th anniversary.

=== Disa Records ===
Disa Records is the second largest Regional-Mexican label after Fonovisa. It was owned by the Chávez family of Monterrey until June 2001, when Univision acquired 50% of Disa from the Chávez family. In November 2006 Univision acquired the other 50% of the label making it a subsidiary of Univision Music Group.

- Disa represents over 50 artists, including Palomo, Los Angeles Azules, Grupo Bryndis, Liberación, El Poder del Norte, and most recently, renowned Mexican actress and singer, Aracely Arámbula.
- In the second quarter of 2004, Univision Music Group recording labels held the #1 position in the U.S. Latin music industry with an estimated 45% market 10.
- Univision Music Group recording labels consistently averaged 5 of the top 10 best-selling albums on Billboard Magazine's weekly Latin charts in 2004.
- Univision Music labels accounted for approximately half of the regional Mexican music sold in the U.S. in the first half of 2004.
- In the first two quarters of 2004, Univision Music recording artists Jennifer Peña, Los Temerarios, Los Tigres del Norte, and Marco Antonio Solís topped Billboard's music charts debuting at #1 in SoundScan sales.
- By the second quarter of 2004 several UMG artists, including include Marco Antonio Solís, Los Temerarios, Los Tigres del Norte, Conjunto Primavera, Jennifer Peña, Akwid, Jae-P, and Adán "Chalino" Sánchez, garnered Gold and Platinum status for sales ranging from 100,000 to one million units.

== See also ==
- List of record labels
