= List of Wisin & Yandel collaborations =

Here is the list of all the collaborations and remixes from Puerto Rican reggaeton duó Wisin & Yandel with other singers in other albums.

== Year ==
2000

- "Todas Quieren Ser Las Mas Bellas" (Feat. Baby Rasta & Gringo)
- "Voy Por Ti" (Feat. Tempo)

2001

- "Sensual Te Ves" (Feat. Baby Ranks)

2002

- "Salgo Filateauo" (Feat. Divino, Baby Ranks)
- "Abusadora" (Feat. Fido)
- "Piden Perreo" (Feat. Alexis & Fido)
- "Sedúceme" (Feat. Alexis)

2003

- "Por Qué No/Una Llamada" (Feat. Tisuby y Georgina)

2004

- "Saoco" (Wisin Feat. Daddy Yankee)
- "El Jinete" (Wisin Feat. Alexis & Fido)
- "No Se" (Wisin Feat. Tony Dize)
- "Estoy Preso" (Wisin Feat. Gallego)
- "Siente El Calor" (Wisin Feat. Tony Dize)
- "Mami, Yo Quisiera Quedarme" (Yandel Feat. Alexis & Fido)
- "La Calle Me Lo Pidió" (Yandel Feat. Tego Calderón)
- "En La Disco Me Conoció" (Yandel Feat. Fido)
- "Listo Para El Cantazo" (Yandel Feat. Alexis)
- "Royal Rumble (Se Van)" (Wisin Feat. Daddy Yankee, Wise, Don Omar, Héctor el Father, Yomo, Franco "El Gorila", Alexis, Zion, Arcángel, El Roocki)

2005

- "Dale" (Feat. Mr. Phillips)
- "Paleta" (Feat. Daddy Yankee)
- "La Barria" (Feat. Héctor el Father)
- "Sensación" (Feat. Tony Dize)
- "Noche de Sexo" (Feat. Anthony "Romeo" Santos)
- "La Compañía" (Feat. Franco "El Gorila", Gadiel)
- "Toma" (Wisin Feat. Franco "El Gorila")
- "La Quebranta Hueso" (Feat. El Tío)
- "No Me Dejes Solo" (Feat. Daddy Yankee)
- "Mayor Que Yo" (Feat. Luny Tunes, Daddy Yankee, Héctor el Father, Baby Ranks)

2006

- "Burn It Up" (Feat. R. Kelly)
- "Take the Lead (Wanna Ride)" (Feat. Bone Thugs-n-Harmony, Fatman Scoop, Melissa Jiménez)
- "Sacala" (Feat. Héctor el Father, Don Omar)
- "Cuando Baila Reggaeton (Yandel Feat. Tego Calderón)
- "Eléctrica" (Feat. Gadiel)
- "Nadie Como Tu" (Feat. Don Omar)
- "Soy De La Calle" (Feat. Franco "El Gorila", Gallego)
- "Quiero Hacerte El Amor" (Feat. El Tío, Franco "El Gorila")
- "Yo Te Quiero (Remix)" (Feat. Luis Fonsi)
- "Hacerte El Amor" (Wisin Feat. Yandel, Nicky Jam)

2007

- "La Pared" (Feat. Don Omar, Gadiel)
- "Un Viaje (Remix)" (Feat. Gadiel)
- "Pegao (Remix)" (Feat. Elephant Man)
- "Atrévete" (Feat. Franco "El Gorila")
- "Perdido" (Yandel Feat. Jayko "El Prototipo")
- "Torre de Babel (Reggaeton Mix)" (Feat. David Bisbal)
- "El Teléfono" (Feat. Héctor el Father)
- "Stars Are Blind (Luny Tunes Remix)" (Feat. Paris Hilton)
- "Noche de Entierro (Nuestro Amor)" (Feat. Daddy Yankee, Héctor el Father, Tony Tun Tun)
- "Lento (Remix)" (Feat. RBD)
- "Lo Nuestro Se Fue (Noche de Entierro Remix)" (Feat. Luny Tunes, Alex Rivera, Ivy Queen, Daddy Yankee)
- "No Llores (Remix)" (Feat. Gloria Estefan)
- "Control" (Feat. Eve)
- "Las Cosas Cambiaron" (Feat. Don Omar)
- "Imaginate" (Feat. Tony Dize)
- "Como Tú No Hay Nadie" (Feat. Jayko "El Prototipo")
- "Oye, ¿Dónde Está El Amor?" (Feat. Franco De Vita)
- "Jangueo" (Feat. Erick Right, Fat Joe)
- "Tu Cuerpo Me Llama" (Feat. Gadiel)
- "Tu Mirada" (Feat. Franco "El Franco")

2008

- "Siguelo (Remix)" (Feat. Jayko "El Prototipo")
- "Animo" (Feat. Tego Calderón)
- "Sexy Movimiento (Remix)" (Feat. Nelly Furtado)
- "Descontrol" (Feat. Tony Dize)
- "Permítame" (Yandel Feat. Tony Dize)
- "Pa' Darle" (Wisin Feat. Tony Dize)
- "Perdido (Bachata Remix)" (Feat. Marcy Place)
- "Lloro Por Ti (Remix)" (Feat. Enrique Iglesias)
- "Asi Soy" (Yandel Feat. Franco "El Gorila")
- "Vamonos A Hacerlo" (Yandel Feat. Franco "El Gorila")

2009

- "Descara (Remix)" (Feat. Yomo)
- "Me Estás Tentando (Remix)" (Feat. Franco "El Gorila", Jayko "El Prototipo")
- "Mujeres In The Club" (Feat. 50 Cent)
- "Me Estoy Muriendo" (Wisin Feat. Franco "El Gorila")
- "Sexo Seguro" (Yandel Feat. Franco "El Gorila")
- "Pa' Lo Oscuro" (Feat. Franco "El Gorila", Yaviah)
- "All Up 2 You" (Feat. Aventura, Akon)
- "All Up 2 You (Remix)" (Feat. Aventura, Akon, Adrian Banton)
- "Perfecto" (Feat. Ivy Queen, Yaviah)
- "¿Cómo Quieres Que Te Olvide?" (Feat. Ednita Nazario)
- "Gracias A Ti (Remix)" (Feat. Enrique Iglesias)
- "Sandugeo" (Feat. Yomo, Franco "El Gorila", Gadiel)
- "Imaginate" (Feat. T-Pain)
- "Desaparecio" (Feat. Gadiel, Tico ''El Imigrante'')
- "Ella Me Llama (Remix)" (Feat. Akon)
- "Suave y Lento" (Wisin Feat. Jowell & Randy, Franco "El Gorila", Tico "El Inmigrante")
- "Amanacer" (Yandel Feat. Jowell & Randy, Gadiel)
- "Prrrum (Remix)" (Feat. Cosculluela)
- "Acercate" (Feat. Ivy Queen)
- "Ella Me Llama Tarde" (Wisin Feat. Tony Dize)

2010

- "Te Siento (Remix)" (Feat. Franco "El Gorila")
- "Te Siento (Remix)" (Feat. Jowell & Randy)
- "Loco (Remix)" (Feat. Jowell & Randy)
- "No Me Digas Que No" (Feat. Enrique Iglesias)
- "Reverse Cowgirl (Remix)" (Feat. T-Pain)
- "Tu Me Peleas" (Yandel Feat. De La Ghetto, Franco "El Gorila")
- "La Reunion De Los Vaqueros" (Feat. Franco "El Gorila", De La Ghetto, Tego Calderón, Cosculluela)
- "Tumbao" (Yandel Feat. De La Ghetto)
- "De Noche Y De Dia" (Yandel Feat. Cosculluela)
- "No Dejes Que Se Apague" (Feat. 50 Cent, T-Pain)

2011

- "Estoy Enamorado (Remix)" (Feat. Larry Hernandez)
- "Zun Zun Rompiendo Caderas (Remix)" (Feat. Pitbull, Tego Calderón)
- "Reggaeton Pesao" (Yandel Feat. Gadiel, Franco "El Gorila")
- "Frío" (Feat. Ricky Martin)
- "Se Acabo" (Feat. Tito "El Bambino")
- "Sigan Bailando" (Feat. Tego Calderón, Franco "El Gorila")
- "Fever" (Feat. Sean Kingston)
- "Perreame" (Feat. Jowell y Randy)
- "Tomando El Control" (Feat. Jayko "El Prototipo", Gadiel)
- "Suavecito y Despacio" (Feat. Alexis & Fido)
- "Uy, Uy, Uy" (Wisin Feat. Franco "El Gorila", O'Neill)
- "Se Viste" (Wisin Feat. Gadiel)
- "Vengo Acabando" (Feat. Alberto Stylee, Franco "El Gorila")
- "Musica Buena" (Yandel Feat. Franco "El Gorila")
- "Duelo" (Wisin Feat. Franco "El Gorila", O'Neill)
- "Energia (Remix)" (Feat. Alexis & Fido)
- "Soñando Despierto" (Feat. Cosculluela)
- "5 O'Clock (Remix)" (Feat. T-Pain)
- "5 O'Clock (Remix)" (Feat. T-Pain, Lily Allen)
- "Vete" (Feat. Aventura)

2012

- "Pass at Me (Remix)" (Feat. Timbaland)
- "Pass at Me (Remix)" (Feat. Timbaland, Pitbull)
- "Follow the Leader" (Featuring Jennifer Lopez)
- "Sexo Y Pasión" (Gadiel feat. Yandel)
- "Si Te Digo La Verdad (Remix)" (Gocho Feat. Wisin)
- "Prende (feat. Franco "El Gorila & O'Neil)
- "Something About You" (feat. Chris Brown & T-Pain)
- "Amor Real" (Gocho feat. Yandel & Wayne Wonder)
- "Me Gustas" (Tito El Bambino feat. Yandel)
- "Hipnotízame (Remix) (feat. Daddy Yankee)

2013

- "Limbo" (Daddy Yankee feat. Wisin & Yandel)
- "Tu Olor (Remix)" (Tito El Bambino feat. Wisin)
- "Yo Soy De Aquí" (Don Omar feat. Yandel, Arcángel & Daddy Yankee)
- "Hable de Ti" (Yandel)
- "Sistema" (Wisin feat. Jory)
- "Zumba (Remix) (Don Omar feat. Yandel & Daddy Yankee)
- "Solo Verte (Remix)" (Cosculluela feat. Wisin & Divino)
- "Tu Carcel" (Marco Antonio Solís feat. Wisin & Yandel, David Bisbal & Alejandra Guzmán) (for La Voz... México)
- "Sistema (Remix)" (Wisin feat. Jory, Tito El Bambino, Cosculluela & Eddie Avila)
- "In Your Eyes" (Inna feat. Yandel)
- "Calenton" (Daddy Yankee feat. Yandel)
- "Moviendo Caderas" (Yandel feat. Daddy Yankee)
- "Enamorado de Ti (Yandel feat. Don Omar)
- "Para Irnos (A Fuego)" [Yandel feat. J Álvarez & Gadiel]
- "Plakito" (Yandel feat. Gadiel)
- "Desde el Primer Beso" (Gocho feat. Wisin)
- "Que no muera la esperanza" (Franco De Vita feat. Wisin)
- "Sexo" (Wisin feat. Zion)
- Baby danger" (Wisin feat. Sean Paul)
- "Que viva la vida (Remix)" (Wisin feat. Michel Teló)
- "La copa de todos" (David Correy feat. Wisin & Paty Cantú)

2014

- "Furia" Oneill Ft Wisin & Ñengo Flow
- "Ricos y Famosos" Tito El Bambino Ft Ñengo Flow & Wisin
- "Muevelo" Sofia Reyes ft Wisin
- "Creo en mi" Natalia Jimenez Ft Wisin
- "La calle lo pidio" Tito el Bambino Ft Cosculluela, Nicky Jam, Wisin, J Alvarez & Zion
- "Desde el primer beso" Gocho ft Wisin & Tito el Bambino
- "Tu cuerpo pide sexo" Wisin Ft Zion
- "El sobreviviente" Wisin Ft 50 Cent
- "Presion" Wisin Ft Cosculluela
- "Si te vas" Wisin Ft Gocho
- "Heavy Heavy" Wisin Ft. Tempo
- "Passion Whine" Farruko Ft. Sean Paul Y Wisin
- "Claro" (Wisin feat. Jory)
- "Mi Peor Error (Remix)" (Alejandra Guzmán feat. Yandel)
- "Prometo Olvidarte (Remix)" (Tony Dize feat. Yandel)
- "Adrenalina" (Wisin feat. Jennifer Lopez & Ricky Martin)
- "Fiesta en San Juan" (Assia Ahhatt feat. Wisin)
- "Humanos a Marte" (Chayanne feat. Yandel)
- "Duro Hasta Abajo" (Yandel feat. Gadiel)
- "Plakito (Remix)" (Yandel feat. Gadiel & Farruko)
- "A Que No Te Atreves (Remix)" (Tito El Bambino feat. Yandel, Chencho & Daddy Yankee)
- "La Calle Me Llama" (Farruko feat. Yandel, Ñengo Flow & D.OZI)
- "Nena Mala" (Wisin feat. Tito El Bambino)
- "La Temperatura" (J Álvarez feat. Wisin)
- "Besar Tu Piel" (Gocho feat. Wisin & O'Neill)
- "Poder" (Wisin feat. Farruko)
- "Control" (Wisin Feat. Chris Brown, Pitbull)
- "Te Extraño" (Wisin Feat. Franco De Vita)

2015

- "Me Marcharé" (Los Cadillacs feat. Wisin)
- "Dale Frontu" (Eloy feat. Wisin)
- "Lejos de Aquí (Remix)" (Farruko feat. Yandel)
- "Nota de Amor" (Wisin feat. Carlos Vives & Daddy Yankee)
- "Yo Quiero Contigo (Remix)" (Wisin feat. Plan B)
- "Pierdo la Cabeza (Remix)" (Zion & Lennox feat. Farruko & Yandel)
- "Báilame" (Shaggy feat. Yandel)
- "Al Bailar" (Yuri feat. Yandel)
- "Como Yo Te Quiero" (El Potro Alvarez feat. Yandel)
- "Quédate Conmigo" (Jory feat. Zion & Wisin)
- "Diggy Down (Remix)" (Inna feat. Yandel & Marian Hill)
- "Calentura (Remix)" (Yandel feat. Tempo)
- "Jaque Mate (Remix)" (Yandel feat. Omega)
- "Él Está Celoso (Remix)" (Tito El Bambino feat. Yandel)
- "Baddest Girl In Town" (Pitbull feat. Mohombi & Wisin)
- "A Ti Te Encanta (Remix)" (Alexis & Fido feat. Tony Dize, Don Miguelo & Wisin)
- "En Lo Oscuro" (Don Omar feat. Wisin & Yandel)
- "Dobla Rodilla (Don Omar feat. Wisin)
- "Las Fresas (Remix Urbano)" (Banda el Recodo feat. Wisin)
- "Rumba" (Anahí feat. Wisin)
- "Baby Boo (Remix)" (Cosculluela feat. Arcángel, Daddy Yankee & Wisin)
- "Piquete (Wisin feat. Plan B)
- "Yo Soy de Barrio" (Tego Calderón feat. Yandel)
- "Tú Me Enloquences (Baby Rasta & Gringo feat. Wisin)
- "Fronteamos Porque Podemos" (De La Ghetto feat. Daddy Yankee, Ñengo Flow & Yandel)
- "Dices (Remix)" (De La Ghetto feat. Arcángel & Wisin)
- "No Sales de Mi Mente" (Yandel feat. Nicky Jam)
- "Mayor Que Yo 3" (Luny Tunes feat. Don Omar, Daddy Yankee & Wisin & Yandel)
- "Ginza (Remix)" (J Balvin feat. Yandel)
- "Si Lo Hacemos Bien (Remix) (Wisin feat. J Álvarez & De La Ghetto)
- "Desde el Día en que Te Fuiste" (ChocQuibTown feat. Wisin)
- "Decídete" (Arcángel feat. Wisin)
- "No Tengo Dinero" (Wisin Feat. Juan Gabriel)
- "Corazon Acelerado (Remix)" (Wisin Feat. Pipe Bueno)
- "Los Vaqueros" (Wisin Feat. Gavilan, Baby Rasta, Cosculluela, Franco "El Gorila", Ñengo Flow, J Alvarez. Farruko, Pusho, Tito "El Bambino". Arcángel, Jenay)
- "Amor de Locos" (Wisin Feat. Jenay, Jory Boy)
- "Que Se Sienta El Deseo" (Wisin Feat. Ricky Martin)
- "Caramelo" (Wisin Feat. Cosculluela, Franco "El Gorila")
- "Dime Que Sucedio" (Wisin Feat. Tony Dize)
- "Ahi Es Que Es" (Wisin Feat. J Alvarez)
- "Tu Libertad" (Wisin Feat. Prince Royce)
- "Nos Queremos" (Wisin Feat. Divino)
- "Yo Me Dejo" (Wisin Feat. Alexis)
- "Ven Bailame" (Wisin Feat. Gocho)
- "Pegate Pa Que Veas" (Wisin Feat. Eloy, Franco "El Gorila")
- "Prisionero" (Wisin Feat. Pedro Capo, Axel)
- "Adicto a Tus Besos" (Wisin Feat. Los Cadillacs)

2016

- "Sola (Remix)" (Wisin Feat. Anuel AA, Farruko, Daddy Yankee, Zion & Lennox)
- "Tan Facil (Urban Remix)" (Wisin Feat. CNCO)
- "Duele El Corazon" (Wisin Feat. Enrique Iglesias)

2017

- "Hacerte El Amor" (Wisin Feat. Yandel, Nicky Jam)
- "Move Your Body" (Wisin Feat. Timbaland, Bad Bunny)
- "Todo Comienza En La Disco" (Wisin Feat. Daddy Yankee, Yandel)
- "Esta Vez" (Wisin Feat. Don Omar)
- "Quisiera Alejarme" (Wisin Feat. Ozuna)
- "Prohibida" (Wisin Feat. Zion & Lennox)
- "Amor Radioactivo" (Wisin Feat. Mario Domm)
- "Dulce" (Wisin Feat. Leslie Grace)
- "Quedate Conmigo (Version Dance)" (Wisin Feat. Chyno Miranda, Gente de Zona, Mauro Menendez)
- "Si Tu La Ves" (Wisin Feat. Nicky Jam)
- "Como Antes" (Yandel Feat. Wisin)
- "Bonita (Remix)" (Wisin Feat. Yandel, Nicky Jam, Jowell & Randy, J Balvin, Ozuna)

2018

- "Callao" (Feat. Ozuna)
- "Aullando" (Feat. Anthony "Romeo" Santos)
- "Dame Algo" (Feat. Bad Bunny)
- "La Luz" (Feat. Maluma)
- "Mi Intencion" (Feat. Miky Woodz)
- "Deseo" (Feat. Zion & Lennox)
- "Ojala" (Feat. Farruko)
- "Quisiera Alejarme (Remix)" (Wisin Feat. Ozuna, CNCO)
- "Todo El Amor" (Wisin Feat. De La Ghetto, Maluma)
- "No Te Vas (Remix)" (Wisin Feat. Nacho, Noriel)
- "Alguien Robo" (Wisin Feat. Sebastián Yatra, Nacho)
- "Quiero Mas" (Wisin Feat. Ozuna, Yandel)
- "Unica (Remix)" (Wisin Feat. Ozuna, Yandel, Anuel AA)
- "Pensando en Ti" (Wisin Feat. Anuel AA)
- "Me Niego" (Wisin Feat. Ozuna, Reik)
- "Solita" (Wisin Feat. Bad Bunny, Ozuna, Almighty)

2019

- "Duele" (Feat. Reik)
- "Si Supieras" (Feat. Daddy Yankee)
- "Imaginaste (Remix)" (Feat. Jhay Cortez)
- "Mi Error (Remix)" (Feat. Eladio Carrión, Zion & Lennox, Lunay)
- "Por Contarle Los Secretos" (Wisin Feat. Jon Z, Chencho Corleone)
- "Una Noche" (Wisin Feat. Rauw Alejandro)
- "3G" (Wisin Feat. Jon Z, Don Chezina)
- "Deseo" (Wisin Feat. Kevin Roldan)
- "Si Me Das Tu Amor" (Wisin Feat. Carlos Vives)
- "Quizas" (Wisin Feat. Sech(singer), Dalex, Justin Quiles, Feid, Lenny Tavarez, Zion)
- "Comerte a Besos" (Wisin Feat. Justin Quiles, Nicky Jam)

2020

- "Ganas de Ti" (Feat. Sech (singer))
- "Moviendolo (Remix)" (Feat. Pitbull, El Alfa)
- "Mi Niña" (Wisin Feat. Myke Towers)
- "Enemigos Ocultos" (Wisin Feat. Ozuna, Myke Towers, Arcángel, Cosculluela, Juanka)
- "Provocame (Remix)" (Wisin Feat. Miky Woodz, Manuel Turizo, Justin Quiles, Lenny Tavarez)
- "Sexy Sensual" (Wisin Feat. Tito "El Bambino", Zion & Lennox, Cosculluela)
- "Gistro Amarillo" (Wisin Feat. Ozuna)
- "Mas de Ti" (Wisin Feat. Gotay "El Autentico", Ozuna)
- "Por Contarle Los Secretos (Reggaeton Remix)" (Wisin Feat. Jon Z, Chencho Corleone)
- "Borracho" (Wisin Feat. Brytiago)
- "Watablamblam" (Wisin Feat. Jumbo, Farruko)
- "Boogaloo Supreme" (Wisin Feat. Victor Manuelle)
- "Una Noche (Unplugged)" (Wisin Feat. Rauw Alejandro)
- "3G (Remix)" (Wisin Feat. Jon Z, Yandel, Farruko, Don Chezina, Chencho Corleone, Myke Towers)

2021

- "Mala Costumbre" (Feat. Manuel Turizo)
- "LEYENDAS" (Feat. Karol G, Nicky Jam, Ivy Queen, Zion, Alberto Stylee)
- "No Te Veo (Remix)" (Feat. Pacho El Antifeka, Jhay Wheeler)
- "Ya Paso" (Feat. Zion, Cosculluela, Revol)
- "Fiel" (Wisin Feat. Jhay Cortez)
- "Emojis de Corazones" (Wisin Feat. Ozuna, Jhay Cortez)
- "Ame" (Wisin Feat. Jumbo, Lyanno, Zion)
- "Fiel (Remix)" (Wisin Feat. Jhay Cortez, Anuel AA, Myke Towers)
- "Mi Niña (Remix)" (Wisin Feat. Myke Towers, Maluma, Anitta (singer))
- "Loco" (Wisin Feat. Nicky Jam, Sech)
- "Amanecer Contigo" (Wisin Feat. Abdiel, Zion)
- "Prendelo" (Wisin Feat. Brray, Jon Z)
- "Prendelo" (Wisin Feat. Jhay Cortez)
- "Baila Conmigo" (Wisin Feat. Linarez, KEVVO, Franco "El Gorila")
- "Mari Mari" (Wisin Feat. Chencho Corleone)
- "En Mi Habitacion" (Wisin Feat. Lunay, Rauw Alejandro)
- "Me Dañas La Mente" (Wisin Feat. Dalex)
- "Mami" (Wisin Feat. Zion)
- "No Me Acostumbro" (Wisin Feat. Reik, Ozuna, Miky Woodz)
- "Pata Abajo" (Wisin Feat. Sech (singer), Yandel)

2022

- "Te Veo Bailar" (Feat. Baby Rasta & Gringo, Brray, Alejandro Armes, DJ Nelson)
- "Sentido" (Feat. Alex Rose)
- "Llueve" (Feat. Sech (singer), Jhay Cortez)
- "Mayor Que Usted" (Feat. Natti Natasha, Daddy Yankee)
- "Cerramos los Ojos" (Wisin Feat. Gotay "El Autentico", Chris Andrew)
- "Me Siento Bien" (Wisin Feat. Chimbala)
- "Por Si Vuelves" (Wisin Feat. Luis Fonsi)
- "Adicta" (Wisin Feat. Lyanno)
- "Extraño" (Wisin Feat. Yandel)
- "Volar" (Wisin Feat. Alejo, Chris Andrew)
- "Buenos Dias" (Wisin Feat. Camilo)
- "Como Tu Lo Haces" (Wisin Feat. Linares)
- "Labios Prohibidos" (Wisin Feat. Abdiel)
- "Por Ley" (Wisin Feat. Linares)
- "Crazy" (Wisin Feat. Ozuna, Arcángel, Lenny Tavarez, Jhay Wheeler)
- "Mato a Cupido (Remix)" (Wisin Feat. Dreah, Chris Andrew)
- "Soy Yo" (Wisin Feat. Don Omar, Gente de Zona)
- "SMP (Sol, Mar y Playa)" (Wisin Feat. Farruko, KEVVO)
