= Te Exitaré =

Single by Valerie Morales

from the album Mi Flow
- Released: December 2003
- Recorded: 2003
- Genre: Reggaetón
- Length: 2:13
- Label: Flow Music
- Songwriters: Valerie Morales, Norgie Noriega
- Producers: DJ Nelson, Noriega, Rafi Mercenario

Valerie Morales singles chronology
| "Te Exitaré" (2003) | "Ven y Baila" (2004) |

"Te Exitaré" (I Will Arouse You) is a song by Puerto Rican singer-songwriter and actress Valerie Morales from her debut studio album Mi Flow (2007). The song was originally released in 2003 and featured on DJ Nelson's and Rafi Mecenario's compilation album Kakoteo Mix (2003). It serves as Morales' debut single, with Morales having already established a career in television prior to recording the song. It reached number thirty-five on the Billboard Tropical Songs chart in December 2003.

== Background and composition ==
In 2001, Morales began appearing in various sketches for comedies on Puerto Rican television "under the production of Tony Mojena Television, an affiliate of Telemundo in Puerto Rico, which included programs such as "El Gran Bejuco", "Susa y Epifanio", "Dame un Break" among others". Morales "saw a need for actors and extras, and eventually started a little talent agency to assist some of her friends find jobs in television as well". She later began appearing in videos for reggaetón artists, when the women that were originally picked could not be there. These included Trebol Clan and Ranking Stone, among others. She has worked with La X 100.7 FM, Univision Radio in New York and KQ103 in Orlando. While going to college full-time, Morales would sing in "locales" where she was the only female. In 2003, she met with long-time friend Noriega. After listening to a song performed by Nelly and Kelly Rowland ("Dilemma"), Morales "ended up singing lyrics she wrote to a similar melody" of the song. She then signed a contract with the record label Flow Music, after Noriega offered her an opportunity to record as a reggaetón artist. That year, she recorded "Te Exitaré".

== Release and chart performance ==
"Te Exitaré" was released in December 2003 via airplay. It was original featured on DJ Nelson's and Rafi Mecenario's compilation album Kakoteo Mix (2003). It has also been featured on a number of other compilation albums including Reggaetón Club Anthems (2005), Reggaetón en la Parada Puertoriqueña, Vol. 2 (2005), Reggaetón Smash (2005) and Slammin' Reggaetón Videos, Vol. 2 (2007). The official remix features Las Guanabanas, it was featured on their compilation album Collection Two (2004). In 2010, the song was rerecorded into merengue by Raul Acosta and Oro Solido on their album Fantasia Urbana (2010). The song debuted at number forty for the week of December 20, 2003 on the Billboard Tropical Songs chart. It peaked at number thirty-five, a week later on December 27, 2003.

== Charts ==
| Chart (2003) | Peak Position |
|---|---|
| US Tropical Songs (Billboard) | 35 |
