= Valerie Morales =

Puerto Rican singer

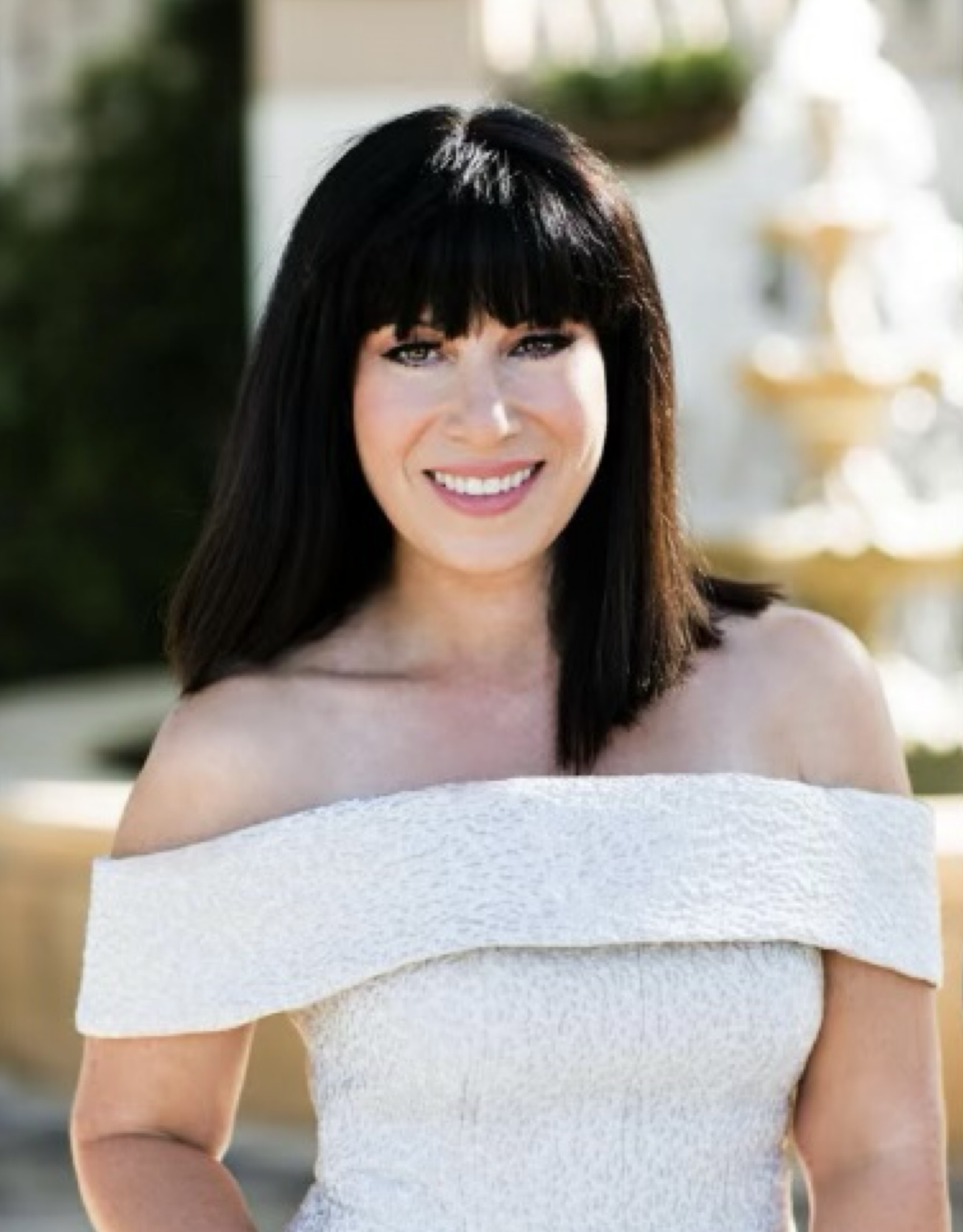
- Morales in 2023

Background information
- Also known as: Valerie, Valerie Flow, Valery
- Born: Valerie Lee Acevedo Lopez; January 18, 1976 (age 50); Fajardo, Puerto Rico
- Genres: Reggaetón; salsa; merengue
- Occupations: Singer; actress
- Instrument: Vocals
- Years active: 2001—present
- Labels: Flow Music (2003-2007); VM Music (2017-present)
- Website: www.valeriemorales.com

Valerie Morales (born January 18, 1976), also known simply as Valerie or Valerie Flow, is a Puerto Rican singer who has worked with a variety of musical performers including Daddy Yankee, Wisin Y Yandel, and Hector & Tito, among others. She was born and raised in Fajardo, Puerto Rico. Morales began her musical career in 1996 and her acting career in 2001.

== Musical career ==
=== 2001–2002: Career beginnings ===
In 2001, Morales began appearing in various sketches for comedies on Puerto Rican television. They were produced by Tony Mojena Television, an affiliate of Telemundo in Puerto Rico. Among the programs were "El Gran Bejuco", "Susa y Epifanio", and "Dame un Break". Morales, wanting to assist some of her friends find jobs in television, eventually started a talent agency. She later began appearing in videos for reggaetón artists, when the women that were originally picked could not be there. These included Trebol Clan and Lito & Polaco, among others. She has worked with La X 100.7 FM, Univision Radio in New Yorks first 24 hour Reggaeton Station "La Kalle", WHKQ ("KQ103") in Orlando and 92.5 Maxima in Tampa (CBS Radio/Beasley Media Group. She has been working for and for La Mega 101.1FM in Tampa, FL.Q Broadcasting.

=== 2003–2005: Flow Music contract and "Te Exitare" ===
Valerie Morales "Te Exitaré" 2003
A 24-second sample of "Te Exitaré", Morales' first big hit.

While going to college full-time, Morales would sing in locales where she was the only female. In 2003, she met with long-time friend Noriega. After listening to a song performed by Nelly and Kelly Rowland ("Dilemma"), Morales "ended up singing lyrics she wrote to a similar melody" of the song. She then signed a contract with the record label Flow Music, after DJ Nelson offered her an opportunity to record as a reggaetón artist under his Flow Music Label. That year, she recorded her first big hit "Te Exitaré", which charted on the Billboard Tropical Songs chart, peaking at number thirty-five.

The following year, she participated in The Noise Biografía with "Lo Que Quiero Es Bailar". Morales was the back-up singer for duo Wisin & Yandel's first three concerts also playing Yandel's girlfriend in the movie Mi Vida. Her 2004 single "Ven y Baila" was featured on Noriega's Contra La Corriente (2004). Eddie Dee then called Morales, and told her he wanted her to sing on a song from him. This was turned into "Donde Hubo Fuego" with Daddy Yankee, which appeared on the former's 2004 album 12 Discípulos. In 2017 Valerie Released her second studio album Mi Corazon, under her independent label VM Music. The album is a reflection of her versatility and style in a different variety of genres that go from salsa and bachata to Kizomba and Cumbia-ton.

=== 2006–present: Mi Flow and TV personality ===
Her debut studio album Mi Flow was released in 2007 under the Flow Music Label, distributed by Universal Music Latino. The album featured "commercial" material, "full of reggaetón ballads" and "clean lyrics" that "women can relate to". Mi Flow did not include "tiraeras (beef between two or more artists) associated with the Reggaetón genre". It featured production by DJ Memo and Sosa among others signed to Flow Music and collaborations with K-Mill, Cidelis and Las Guanabanas. An editor for Allmusic claimed the album to be "as crammed with hot beats and irresistible tunes as you'd expect from such a multi-faceted talent." In 2008, she was hired by Telemundo Studios Miami to record "Doble Vida" the theme song for the telenovela El Rostro de Analía on Telemundo. Since 2012, Morales was the lead on-air personality for 92.5 Maxima in Tampa, Florida. In 2018 she was offered to be the lead on-air personality for 101.1 FM La Mega, also in Tampa, Florida.
