= Pasarela =

Pasarela may refer to:

- "Pasarela" (Dalmata song), a song by Dalmata
- "Pasarela" (Daddy Yankee song), a song by Daddy Yankee
