= Flow la Discoteka 2 =

Flow La Discoteka 2

Studio album by DJ Nelson
- Released: March 6, 2007
- Recorded: 2006/2007
- Genre: Reggaeton, Latin, hip hop
- Label: Flow Music
- Producer: DJ Nelson (Exec.); DJ Memo; Marioso

DJ Nelson chronology
Flow La Discoteka (2004)	Flow La Discoteka 2 (2007)

Singles from Flow la Discoteka 2
- 1. "Chica Virtual" Released: 2007; 2. "Pasarela" Released: 2007

Alternative cover
- EP 5-track cover version

Flow La Discoteka 2 is the seventh album produced by DJ Nelson released on March 6, 2007. It is a sequel to Flow la Discoteka.

== Track listing ==
#	Title	Time
1.	"Intro - Bienvenido a Mi Discoteka"; English Title: Welcome to My Disco; Performer(s): DJ Nelson	1:01
2.	"Chica Virtual"; English Title: Virtual Girl; Performer(s): Arcángel	4:24
3.	"Pasarela"; English Title: Runway; Performer(s): Dalmata	3:47
4.	"¿Qué Pasará?"; English Title: What Will Happen? Performer(s): Zion	4:43
5.	"Mal de Amores"; English Title: Love Sickness; Performer(s): Ñejo	3:42
6.	"La Soledad"; English Title: The Solitude; Performer(s): Jowell y Randy	4:42
7.	"Dale Mami Dámelo"; English Title: Give It, Mami, Give It to Me; Performer(s): Julio Voltio	3:54
8.	"Anoche"; English Title: Last Night; Performer(s): Huey Dunbar & De La Ghetto	3:47
9.	"Bambula"; Performer(s): Abrante & Tego Calderón	3:19
10.	"¿Mami Qué Tú Necesitas?"; English Title: Mami, What Do You Need? Performer(s): Andy Boy	2:54
11.	"Love, Sex and Disco"; Performer(s): AJ	3:49
12.	"Peligrosa"; English Title: Dangerous; Performer(s): Ñejo & Dalmata	3:33
13.	"Mami Get Low"; Performer(s): Chillin	2:55
14.	"Club Bango"; Performer(s): Gringo "El Independiente"	3:27
15.	"Dime Si Tú Quieres Más"; English Title: Tell Me If You Want More; Performer(s): Guelo Star	3:05
16.	"Guayándote"; Performer(s): Las Guanábanas & Noriega	3:27
17.	"Me Enamoré de Mi Prima"; English Title: I Fell In Love With My Cousin; Performer(s): Eliot	3:33
18.	"Algo de Ti Me Llama"; English Title: Something About You Calls Me; Performer(s): O'Neill	3:40
19.	"Muévela Muévela"; English Title: Move It, Move It; Performer(s): Andy Boy	3:09
20.	"Depende"; English Title: It Depends; Performer(s): JQ The #1 Contender	3:03
21.	"¿Cómo Estás? (Remix)"; English Title: How Are You? Performer(s): Ñejo & Huey Dunbar	3:42
22.	"Gracias Mama"; English Title: Thank You Mama; Performer(s): El Niño	3:02

== Chart performance ==
It peaked at No. 28 on the Billboard Top Latin Albums chart. On the Billboard Latin Rhythm Albums and Top Heatseekers charts, the album reached Nos. 6 and 20, respectively.

=== Chart positions ===
Chart (2007)	Peak position
US Billboard Latin Rhythm Albums	6
US Billboard Top Heatseekers	20
US Billboard Top Latin Albums	28
