= Flow la Discoteka =

Studio album by DJ Nelson
- Released: October 12, 2004
- Recorded: 2003–2004
- Genre: Reggaeton
- Label: Flow
- Producers: DJ Nelson (exec.); Rafy Mercenario; Coyote; Luny Tunes; Naldo; Nely el Arma Secreta; Noriega

DJ Nelson chronology
Flow la Discoteka (2004)	Flow la Discoteka 2 (2007)

Flow la Discoteka is the first album by DJ Nelson, released on October 12, 2004. It was nominated for a Lo Nuestro Award for Urban Album of the Year.

== Track listing ==
1. "Cochiniar" (by Cochinola) - 3:36
2. "Tú No Tienes Miedo" (by Daddy Yankee & Ivy Queen) - 1:20
3. "Yo Voy a Llegar" (by Zion) - 3:45
4. "Que No Pare el Bailoteo" (by Master Joe & O.G. Black) - 2:28
5. "Noche de Travesura" (by Héctor el Father & Divino) - 3:32
6. "Hay Algo en Tra (Instrumental Mix)" (Various Artists) - 3:13
7. "Vente Vamos a Bellakear" (by Las Guanábanas) - 3:09
8. "¿Qué Es Lo Que Quiere?" (by Tempo) - 1:58
9. "No Me Compares" (by Zion & Lennox) - 3:29
10. "Nos Fuimos Hasta Abajo" (by Daddy Yankee) - 1:22
11. "Ella Es de la Calle" (by Joan & O'Neil) - 2:43
12. "Perreando Mix" (Various Artists) - 3:49
13. "Hace Tiempo" (by Wibal & Alex) - 2:49
14. "Americano (Loco Mix)" (Various Artists) - 2:20
15. "Hasta Que Amanezca" (by Chanteli) - 2:57
16. "Mami Tú Quiere" (by Andy Boy) - 3:09
17. "Aquí Llegó La Que Le Mete Flow" (by K-Mil) - 2:58
18. "Muévelo Mix" (Various Artists) - 2:33
19. "Cuando Mi Perra" (by Ivy Queen) - 2:12
20. "Yo Voy a Llegar" (by Zion) - 3:59
21. "Noche" (by Micky & Tomm) - 2:27
22. "American (Interlude) (Live)" (Various Artists) - 2:46
23. "Tengo un Problema" (by El Calvo) - 3:08
24. "Estamos en Baja" (by Nano MC) - 2:48
25. "Y Escápate" (by Aldo & Nnadi) - 3:25

== Charts ==
Chart (2004)	Peak position
US Top Latin Albums (Billboard)	12
US Tropical Albums (Billboard)	3
US Reggae Albums (Billboard)	3
