= Chica Virtual =

2007 single by Arcángel

Single by Arcángel

from the album Flow la Discoteka 2 & El Fenómeno
- Released: February 2007
- Recorded: 2007
- Genre: Hip hop, dance
- Length: 4:24
- Label: Universal, Flow Music
- Songwriter: Austin Santos
- Producer: DJ Nelson

Arcángel singles chronology
| "Agresivo" (2006) | "Chica Virtual" (2007) | "Aparentemente" (2007) |

"Chica Virtual" (English: Virtual Girl) is a 2007 single by reggaeton singer Arcángel, released in February 2007 by Universal Music Group. It was produced by executive producer DJ Nelson, and appears on the compilation album Flow la Discoteka 2, as well as Arcángel's debut studio album El Fenómeno.

== Chart performance ==
The song was a minor success on the U.S. Billboard Hot Latin Songs chart, peaking at #22.

=== Chart positions ===
| Chart (2008) | Peak position |
|---|---|
| U.S. Billboard Hot Latin Songs | 22 |
| U.S. Billboard Latin Rhythm Airplay | 9 |
| U.S. Billboard Latin Tropical Airplay | 16 |
