= List of Billboard Latin Rhythm Albums number ones of 2014 =

The Latin Rhythm Albums chart is a music chart published in Billboard magazine. The data is compiled by Nielsen SoundScan from a sample that includes music stores, music departments at electronics and department stores, internet sales (both physical and digital) and verifiable sales from concert venues in the United States. The chart is composed of studio, live, and compilation releases by Latin artists performing in the Latin hip hop, urban, dance and reggaeton, the most popular Latin Rhythm music genres.

== Albums ==
Chart date	Album	Artist(s)	Reference
January 4	De Líder a Leyenda	Yandel	
January 11	De Líder a Leyenda	Yandel	
January 18	De Líder a Leyenda	Yandel	
January 25	De Líder a Leyenda	Yandel	
February 1	De Líder a Leyenda	Yandel	
February 8	De Líder a Leyenda	Yandel	
February 15	De Líder a Leyenda	Yandel	
February 22	De Líder a Leyenda	Yandel	
March 1	De Líder a Leyenda	Yandel	
March 8	De Camino Pa' La Cima	J Álvarez	
March 15	Multi Viral	Calle 13	
March 22	Multi Viral	Calle 13	
March 29	La Esencia	Alexis & Fido	
April 5	El Regreso del Sobreviviente	Wisin	
April 12	El Regreso del Sobreviviente	Wisin	
April 19	El Regreso del Sobreviviente	Wisin	
April 26	El Regreso del Sobreviviente	Wisin	
May 3	El Regreso del Sobreviviente	Wisin	
May 10	El Regreso del Sobreviviente	Wisin	
May 17	El Regreso del Sobreviviente	Wisin	
May 24	El Regreso del Sobreviviente	Wisin	
May 31	El Regreso del Sobreviviente	Wisin	
June 7	El Regreso del Sobreviviente	Wisin	
June 14	El Regreso del Sobreviviente	Wisin	
June 21	El Regreso del Sobreviviente	Wisin	
June 28	El Regreso del Sobreviviente	Wisin	
July 5	El Regreso del Sobreviviente	Wisin	
July 12	El Regreso del Sobreviviente	Wisin	
July 19	El Regreso del Sobreviviente	Wisin	
July 26	El Regreso del Sobreviviente	Wisin	
August 2	El Regreso del Sobreviviente	Wisin	
August 9	El Regreso del Sobreviviente	Wisin	
August 16	El Regreso del Sobreviviente	Wisin	
August 23	Golpe Avisa	Cartel de Santa	
August 30	Golpe Avisa	Cartel de Santa	
September 6	La Familia	J Balvin	
September 13	Legacy: De Líder a Leyenda Tour (EP)	Yandel	
September 20	La Familia	J Balvin	
September 27	Love & Sex	Plan B	
October 4	Love & Sex	Plan B	
October 11	Love & Sex	Plan B	
October 18	Love & Sex	Plan B	
October 25	Love & Sex	Plan B	
November 1	La Familia	J Balvin	
November 8	Love & Sex	Plan B	
November 15	Farruko Presenta: Los Menores	Farruko	
November 22	Farruko Presenta: Los Menores	Farruko	
November 29	Love & Sex	Plan B	
December 6	Farruko Presenta: Los Menores	Farruko	
December 13	Alta Jerarquía	Tito El Bambino	
December 20	Alta Jerarquía	Tito El Bambino	
December 27	Alta Jerarquía	Tito El Bambino	
