= J Álvarez discography =

- Studio albums: 9
- Singles: 11
- Music videos: 1

This is a comprehensive listing of official releases by J Álvarez, a Puerto Rican reggaeton artist.

== Albums ==
=== Studio albums ===
List of albums, with selected chart positions and certifications
| Title | Album details | Peak chart positions | | | Certifications |
| Title | Album details | US Billboard 200 | US Latin | US Latin Rhythm | Certifications |
|---|---|---|---|---|---|
| Otro Nivel De Musica | Released: September 20, 2011; Label: Universal Music Latino; Formats: CD, digital download | — | 36 | 2 | |
| De Camino Pa' La Cima | Released: February 18, 2014; Label: On Top of the World, Sony Music Latin; Formats: CD, digital download | 174 | 2 | 1 | |
| Big Yauran | Released: September 23, 2016; Label: On Top of the World; Formats: CD, digital download | — | — | 8 | |
| La Fama Que Camina | Released: March 30, 2018; Label: On Top of the World; Formats: CD, digital download | — | — | — | RIAA: Gold (Latin) |

=== Singles ===
| Year | Single | Chart peak positions | | | Album | Certifications |
| Year | Single | Hot Latin Songs | Latin Rhythm Airplay | Latin Tropical Airplay | Album | Certifications |
|---|---|---|---|---|---|---|
| 2011 | "La Pregunta" | 5 | 3 | 10 | Otro Nivel De Musica | RIAA: 6× Platinum (Latin) |
| 2011 | "Junto Al Amanecer" | 37 | - | - | Otro Nivel De Musica | RIAA: Platinum (Latin) |
| 2013 | "Actua" | - | - | 31 | De Camino Pa' La Cima | |
| 2013 | "El Business" | - | - | - | De Camino Pa' La Cima | |
| 2013 | "El Duelo" | 40 | - | 23 | De Camino Pa' La Cima | |
| 2013 | "Se Acabó El Amor" | 33 | 8 | 17 | Imperio Nazza: J Alvarez Edition | RIAA: Gold (Latin) |
| 2014 | "No Hay - Remix" (feat. Ivy Queen) | - | 23 | - | Vendetta | |
| 2015 | "Quiero Olvidar" | 30 | 9 | 22 | De Camino Pa' La Cima Reloaded | |
| 2015 | "La Pelicula" (feat. Cosculluela) | 50 | 12 | 1 | De Camino Pa' La Cima Reloaded | |
| 2016 | "Haters" | - | - | - | Big Yauran | RIAA: 3× Platinum (Latin) |
| 2016 | "Rico Suave" | 29 | 14 | 2 | La Fama Que Camina | RIAA: Gold (Latin) |
| 2017 | "Esa Boquita" | 32 | 9 | - | La Fama Que Camina | RIAA: Gold (Latin) |
| 2018 | "De La Mía Personal" | - | - | - | La Fama Que Camina | RIAA: Gold (Latin) |

=== Album appearances ===
| Year | Song | Artist | Album |
|---|---|---|---|
| 2012 | "El Amante" | Daddy Yankee | Prestige |
| 2013 | "Una Respuesta" | Daddy Yankee | King Daddy |
| 2015 | "Imborrable" | Ivy Queen | Vendetta |
