= Broke & Famous: Still Broke the Mixtape =

Studio album by Ñejo & Dalmata
- Released: January 13, 2009
- Recorded: 2008
- Genre: Reggaeton
- Labels: Flow Music; Universal Latino
- Producer: DJ Nelson

Ñejo & Dalmata chronology
Broke & Famous (2007)	Broke & Famous: Still Broke the Mixtape (2009)	Ñejo & Dalmata EP (2012)

Broke & Famous: Still Broke the Mixtape is an album released by the reggaeton duo Ñejo & Dalmata in 2009.

== Track listing ==
1. "Cuando La Calle Habla" (Ñejo feat. Various Artists)
2. "La Ando Buscando" (Ñejo & Dalmata)
3. "Olvídate De Eso" (Ñejo & Dalmata feat. Alexis & Fido)
4. "Salvaje" (Dalmata)
5. "Marihuana" (Ñejo)
6. "Vamos A Tirarnos A La Maroma" (feat. K-Mill)
7. "Algo Musical (Remix)" (Ñejo & Dalmata feat. Arcangel & Daddy Yankee)
8. "Ready To Fly" (Dalmata)
9. "Dímelo Pa’ Donde" (Ñejo & Dalmata feat. J-King, Maximan & Guelo Star)
10. "No Vuelva A Llorar" (Ñejo & Dalmata feat. Nano MC)
11. "Más Que A Mi Vida" (Ñejo & Dalmata feat. Cosculluela)
12. "Corazón Roto" (Ñejo)
13. "Voy A Hacertelo" (Ñejo & Dalmata feat. Naldo)
14. "Eso Que Tienes Tú" (Dalmata feat. Gustavo Laureano)
15. "Cayendo En Ti" (Ñejo & Dalmata feat. VR)
16. "Un Call (Remix)" (Ñejo & Dalmata feat. Falo, Chyno Nyno, Yomo & Jowell)
17. "Ando En La FJ" (Ñejo)
18. "Loca Con Su Tiguere" (Ñejo & Dalmata feat. Julio Voltio & El Cata)
19. "Mix"
20. "Navidad" (Ñejo & Dalmata)
