= Francotiradores 2 =

Studio album by Master Joe & O.G. Black
- Released: November 7, 2001
- Recorded: 2000–2001
- Genre: Reggaeton
- Length: 1:03:50
- Labels: Pina Records, Diamond Collections
- Producer: DJ Blass

Master Joe & O.G. Black chronology
| Francotiradores (2000) | Francotiradores 2 (2001) | La Coleccion (2003) |

Singles from Francotiradores 2
- 1. "Bailen, Yackien" Released: 2001; 2. "El Aroma De Tu Piel" Released: 2001; 3. "Quieres Ser Mi Gata? (feat. Jenay)" Released: 2001

Francotiradores 2 (English: "Snipers 2") is a 2001 album by Master Joe & O.G. Black. It was the second part of Francotiradores. It was peaked at 35 in Top Latin Albums and 19 in Latin Pop Albums.

== Track listing ==
1. "Intro El Francotirador" (DJ Blass)
2. "Por Envidiarme"
3. "Lento"
4. "Lo Tendrás Que Hacer" (feat. Baby Rasta & Gringo)
5. "Bailen, Yackien"
6. "¿Señora Por Qué?"
7. "El Fake De La Esperanza" (O.G. Black solo) (diss to Tempo)
8. "Celosa"
9. "El Aroma De Tu Piel"
10. "Sorpresa" (feat. Maicol & Manuel)
11. "Ya No Se Ven" (Master Joe solo)
12. "Dime La Que Hay"
13. "Nuevo Disco, Nuevo Año"
14. "¿Quieres Ser Mi Gata?" (feat. Jenay)
15. "Legalicen"
16. "Boom" (feat. Frankie Boy)
17. "Francotiradores" (feat. Jenay, Blade Pacino) (diss to Tempo)

== Charts ==
| Chart (2002) | Peak position |
|---|---|
| US Latin Pop Albums (Billboard) | 19 |
| US Top Latin Albums (Billboard) | 35 |
