= List of number-one Billboard Hot Tropical Songs of 2005 =

The Billboard Tropical Songs chart is a music chart that ranks the best-performing tropical songs of the United States. Published by Billboard magazine, the data are compiled by Nielsen Broadcast Data Systems based on each single's weekly airplay.

== Chart history ==
Issue date	Song	Artist	Ref
January 1	"Perdidos"	Monchy & Alexandra	
January 8	"Perdidos"	Monchy & Alexandra	
January 15	"Perdidos"	Monchy & Alexandra	
January 22	"Perdidos"	Monchy & Alexandra	
January 29	"Perdidos"	Monchy & Alexandra	
February 5	"Perdidos"	Monchy & Alexandra	
February 12	"Perdidos"	Monchy & Alexandra	
February 19	"Perdidos"	Monchy & Alexandra	
February 26	"Ya No Queda Nada"	Tito Nieves Featuring India, Nicky Jam & K-Mil	
March 5	"Para Ti"	Juan Luis Guerra	
March 12	"Lo Que Pasó, Pasó"	Daddy Yankee	
March 19	"Lo Que Pasó, Pasó"	Daddy Yankee	
March 26	"Lo Que Pasó, Pasó"	Daddy Yankee	
April 2	"Lo Que Pasó, Pasó"	Daddy Yankee	
April 9	"Lo Que Pasó, Pasó"	Daddy Yankee	
April 16	"Lo Que Pasó, Pasó"	Daddy Yankee	
April 23	"Lo Que Pasó, Pasó"	Daddy Yankee	
April 30	"En Soledad"	Jimena	
May 7	"En Soledad"	Jimena	
May 14	"Se Fue y Me Dejó"	Ismael Miranda Featuring Cheka & Andy Montañez	
May 21	"Lo Que Pasó, Pasó"	Daddy Yankee	
May 28	"La Gorda Linda"	Arthur Hanlon Featuring Tito Nieves	
June 4	"La Tortura"	Shakira Featuring Alejandro Sanz	
June 11	"La Tortura"	Shakira Featuring Alejandro Sanz	
June 18	"Mayor Que Yo"	Baby Ranks, Daddy Yankee, Tonny Tun-Tun, Wisin, Yandel & Héctor el Father	
June 25	"Mayor Que Yo"	Baby Ranks, Daddy Yankee, Tonny Tun-Tun, Wisin, Yandel & Héctor el Father	
July 2	"I Love Salsa"	N'Klabe	
July 9	"Mayor Que Yo"	Baby Ranks, Daddy Yankee, Tonny Tun Tun, Wisin, Yandel & Héctor el Father	
July 16	"Mayor Que Yo"	Baby Ranks, Daddy Yankee, Tonny Tun Tun, Wisin, Yandel & Héctor el Father	
July 23	"Mayor Que Yo"	Baby Ranks, Daddy Yankee, Tonny Tun Tun, Wisin, Yandel & Héctor el Father	
July 30	"Mayor Que Yo"	Baby Ranks, Daddy Yankee, Tonny Tun Tun, Wisin, Yandel & Héctor el Father	
August 6	"Mayor Que Yo"	Baby Ranks, Daddy Yankee, Tonny Tun Tun, Wisin, Yandel & Héctor el Father	
August 13	"Mayor Que Yo"	Baby Ranks, Daddy Yankee, Tonny Tun Tun, Wisin, Yandel & Héctor el Father	
August 20	"Reggaetón Latino"	Don Omar	
August 27	"Nada Es Para Siempre"	Luis Fonsi	
September 3	"Nada Es Para Siempre"	Luis Fonsi	
September 10	"Ella y Yo"	Aventura Featuring Don Omar	
September 17	"Qué Ironía"	Andy Andy	
September 24	"Amor De Una Noche"	N'Klabe	
October 1	"Amor De Una Noche"	N'Klabe	
October 8	"Amor De Una Noche"	N'Klabe	
October 15	"La Zalamera"	Chichí Peralta With Joe Vasconcelos	
October 22	"Ella y Yo"	Aventura Featuring Don Omar	
October 29	"Amor De Una Noche"	N'Klabe	
November 5	"Cuéntale"	Ivy Queen	
November 12	"Amor De Una Noche"	N"Klabe	
November 19	"Amor De Una Noche"	N"Klabe	
November 26	"Rompe"	Daddy Yankee	
December 3	"Rompe"	Daddy Yankee	
December 10	"Rompe"	Daddy Yankee	
December 17	"Rompe"	Daddy Yankee	
December 24	"Amor Eterno"	Cristian Castro	
December 31	"Rompe"	Daddy Yankee	

== See also ==
- List of number-one Billboard Hot Tropical Songs of 2006
- List of number-one Billboard Hot Latin Songs of 2005
- List of number-one Billboard Hot Latin Pop Airplay of 2005
