= Gold Series Vol.1 =

Compilation album by Master Joe & O.G. Black
- Released: July 9, 2013
- Genre: Reggaeton
- Label: Diamond Collections

Master Joe & O.G. Black chronology
Los K-Becillas (2005)	Gold Series Vol.1 (2013)	Gold Series Vol.2 (2014)

Gold Series Vol.1 is the comeback album from Master Joe & O.G. Black. It is a collection of the best hits by their duo.

== Track listing ==
1. Bailen, Yakien (Francotiradores II 2002)
2. Sexolandia feat. Guanábanas (Francotiradores 2000)
3. Actúa feat. Lennox (Los Kbecillas 2005)
4. Brochando (Reggaeton Notorious 2006)
5. Banshee Robao feat. Warrionex & Yerai (Sabotaje 2004)
6. Vamo Allá 2 (NEW VERSION 2005)
7. Carita De Nena (Sabotaje 2004)
8. Cuantas Gerlas (La Coleccion 2003)
9. Lento (Francotiradores II 2002)
10. Gracias Por Crearme (Francotiradores 2000)
11. Señora Porque? (Francotiradores II 2002)
12. Presten Atención (Francotiradores 2000)
13. Mientras Tanto feat. Noriega (Sabotaje 2004)
14. Este Es Mi Año (La Conspiracion 2001)
15. Put Your Hands Up feat. Yomo (Sabotaje 2004)
