= Francotiradores =

Studio album by Master Joe & O.G. Black
- Released: October 24, 2000
- Recorded: 1999–2000
- Genre: Reggaeton
- Labels: Diamond Collections; Pina Records
- Producers: DJ Blass, DJ Joe

Master Joe & O.G. Black chronology
Francotiradores (2000)	Francotiradores 2 (2002)

Singles from Francotiradores
- 1. "Bendicion Abuela" Released: November 8, 2000; 2. "Girla Te Bese (feat. Rey Pirin)" Released: December 16, 2000

Francotiradoes (English: "Snipers") is the debut album by Master Joe & O.G. Black. It was released in October 24, 2000 by Pina Records and Diamond Collections.

== Track listing ==
1. "Intro"
2. "Llegó La Hora"
3. "No Hay Quien Pueda" (feat. Karel & Voltio)
4. "Oh Gial"
5. "La Carta" (diss to Mexicano 777 & Tempo)
6. "No Se Me Olvida" (feat. Gavilan)
7. "Girla Te Besé" (feat. Rey Pirin)
8. "Presten Atención"
9. "Bendición Abuela" (diss to Mexicano 777 & Tempo)
10. "Entra Sin Ropa" (feat. Sir Speedy)
11. "Gracias Por Crearme"
12. "Sexolandia" (feat. Guanábanas)
13. "Sigo Vivo" (diss to Mexicano 777 & Tempo)
14. "Francotiradores" (feat. Jenay, Yaga & DJ Blass)
