= K-Mil =

American rapper

- Also known as: La Nena Del Flow Music
- Born: Lilian Maranet; San Juan, Puerto Rico
- Origin: San Juan, Puerto Rico
- Genres: Reggaetón, hip hop
- Occupations: Singer-songwriter, record producer
- Years active: 1996—present
- Label: Flow Music

Lilian Maranet, known as K-Mil or K-Mill, is a Puerto Rican reggaetón singer-songwriter and record producer. She began her career in 2003 with "Quien Tiene Mas Flow", a song which was featured on Luny Tunes and Noriega's debut compilation album Mas Flow. She continued recording with some of the best reggaetón producers including DJ Nelson and Rafi Mecenario, appearing on several compilation albums produced by the two, among others. Despite starting her career in 2003, K-Mil has yet to release a studio album.

== Musical career ==
K-Mil "Gatas" (2004)
An 18-second sample of "Gatas" performed by K-Mil.

In 2003, K-Mil recorded her first song "Quien Tiene Mas Flow" ("Who Has More Flow") for Luny Tunes and Noriega's debut compilation album Mas Flow. Before then, she had been performing at a club called "The Noise" in San Juan, Puerto Rico. She has appeared on compilation albums produced by DJ Nelson and Rafi Mercenario, among others. In 2004, she appeared on salsa singer Tito Nieves' "Ya No Queda Nada" from his debut record for Sony, Fabricando Fantasias. The song also featured salsa singer La India along with reggaetón rapper Nicky Jam. According to Evan Gutierrez of Allmusic, the track was "as bold and modern as it comes". It reached number one on the Billboard Tropical Songs chart for the week of February 26, 2005. This resulted in the quartet receiving a 2005 Billboard Latin Music Award nomination for "Tropical Airplay Track of the Year, Duo or Group". Other songs performed by K-Mill are "A Ver Quien Da Más", "Aquí Llego La Que Le Mete Flow", "Asi Es Que Eh" with Lisa M, "Con El Fuete" with D'Mingo, "Dale Mas Duro" with Las Guanabanas, "Gatas", "Mas Perreo", "Métele Perro", "Pa' Que Sudes" and the self-written "Sigo Aquí". K-Mil has yet to release a studio album, however. She is good friends with fellow reggaetón artist Ivy Queen.
