= Sabotage (disambiguation) =

Sabotage is an act of destruction or interference intended to weaken an opponent.

Sabotage may also refer to:

== Video games ==
- Sabotage (video game), a 1981 computer game for the Apple II
- Velvet Assassin, a 2008 computer game known as Sabotage early in development

== Films ==
- Sabotage (1936 film), a British film by Alfred Hitchcock
- Sabotage (1939 film), an American action film
- Sabotage (1942 film), a Hungarian thriller film
- Sabotage (1966 film), the ninth installment of the Filipino film series featuring Agent X-44, starring Tony Ferrer
- Sabotage (1996 film), a martial arts film with Mark Dacascos
- Sabotage! (film), a 2000 comedy film about the battle of Waterloo, with David Suchet as Napoleon
- Sabotage (2014 film), an American action thriller/crime drama film

== Literature ==
- Bureau of Sabotage, a fictional government entity invented by author Frank Herbert

== Television ==
- "Sabotage" (Brooklyn Nine-Nine), a 2015 episode
- "Sabotage" (Danger Man), a 1961 episode
- "Sabotage" (Star Wars: The Clone Wars), a 2013 episode
- "Sabotage" (Stargate Universe), a 2010 episode
- Sabotage, series 2 of The Tunnel, 2016

== Music ==
=== Artists ===
- Sabotage (rapper) (1973–2003), Brazilian rapper

=== Albums and EPs ===
- Sabotage (Black Sabbath album), 1975
- Sabotage (Master Joe y O.G. Black album), 2004
- Sabotage, by Cancer Bats, 2010
- Sabotage, by Klinik, 1985
- Sabotage, by Kwon Eun-bi, 2024

=== Songs ===
- "Sabotage" (Beastie Boys song), 1994
- "Sabotage" (Bebe Rexha song), 2021
- "Sabotage" (JoJo song), 2019
- "Sabotage", by Kristinia DeBarge from Exposed, 2019
- "Sabotage", by Laufey from A Matter of Time, 2025
- "Sabotage", by Suede from Bloodsports, 2013
