= Imparable =

Studio album by O.G. Black
- Released: Jun 25, 2013
- Recorded: 2010–2013
- Genre: Reggaeton
- Label: BR Entertainment

O.G. Black chronology
Imparable (2013)	Back To The Underground: El Francotirador Edition (2013)

Singles from Imparable
- 1. "Menor De Edad" Released: 2013

Imparable is the O.G. Black's debut album.

== Track listing ==
1. Menor De Edad
2. Top Secret (Official Remix) (feat. Cosculluela, Opi "The Hit Machine", Guayo "El Bandido", Yomo & Yaviah)
3. Curiosidad (feat. Trebol Clan)
4. Mi Ex
5. Caza Bichotes (feat. J-King & Maximan & Guayo "El Bandido")
6. Pal Motel (feat. Guayo "El Bandido")
7. Rankankan (feat. Julio Voltio, Ñengo Flow, Farruko, Yaga & Mackie, Baby Rasta, Guelo Star, O'Neill & Guayo "El Bandido")
8. Prestame Tu Cuerpo (feat. Opi "The Hit Machine")
9. Soltera Y Sin Compromiso (feat. Guayo "El Bandido")
10. Despues De 2 Tragos (feat. D.OZi & Guayo "El Bandido")
11. Hacertelo En Un Avion (feat. Kid & JQ)
12. Mi Locura (feat. Noriega)
13. Tengo Amor Para Dar (feat. Elias Diaz)
14. Siento (feat. Kmero)
15. Menor De Edad (Official Remix) (feat. Yaga & Mackie)
