= Pasarela (Dalmata song) =

Single by Dalmata

from the album Flow la Discoteka 2
- Released: February 2007
- Recorded: 2006/2007
- Genre: Reggaeton
- Length: 3:47
- Label: Universal, Flow Music
- Songwriter(s): Nelson Diaz, Raymond Diaz, Eliot Jose Feliciano, Fernando Mangual-Valquez
- Producer(s): DJ Nelson, Marioso, DJ Memo

"Pasarela" is a 2007 single by Puerto Rican reggaeton singer Dalmata (better known from the duo Ñejo y Dalmata) from DJ Nelson's second compilation album Flow la Discoteka 2. It was released in February 2007 by Universal Music Group and was produced by DJ Nelson, Marioso, DJ Unique and DJ Memo. The song features a unique reggaeton sound incorporating sounds from Mexican mariachi. Dalmata was practically unknown in the reggaeton scene before the release of this song, which brought him international fame.

== Chart performance ==
Chart (2007)	Peak position
U.S. Billboard Hot Latin Songs	48
U.S. Billboard Latin Rhythm Airplay	35
U.S. Billboard Latin Tropical Airplay	10
