= Sabotage (Master Joe y O.G. Black album) =

Studio album by Master Joe & O.G. Black
- Released: September 28, 2004
- Recorded: 2004
- Genre: Reggaeton
- Length: 1:08:34
- Label: Ole Music
- Producer: Monserrate & DJ Urba, DJ Joe, DJ Sonic, Dwella, DJ Blaster, Noriega, Rafy Mercenario, Sosa

Master Joe & O.G. Black chronology
La Coleccion (2003)	Sabotage (2004)	Los K-Becillas (2005)

Singles from Sabotage
- 1. "Banshee Robao (feat. Yerai & Warionex)" Released: 2004; 2. "Carita De Nena" Released: 2004

Peaked at 8 in Top Reggae Albums, 9 in Top Tropical Albums and 59 in Top Latin Albums.

== Track listing ==
1. El Escalzeo
2. Si Tú No Me Llamas
3. Mi Locura (feat. Noriega)
4. Banshee Robao (feat. Yerai & Warionex)
5. Eres Prohibida (feat. Nicky Jam)
6. Somos Calle (feat. Don Chezina)
7. Carita de Nena
8. Put Your Handz Up! (feat. Yomo)
9. To'a la Noche (feat. Jenay)
10. Aguajera
11. Asegúrate (feat. Baby Rasta)
12. Mujeres
13. Ya Me Cansé (feat. Denual)
14. Rompe y Vacila
15. Rompe el Suelo (feat. Bimbo, Yomo)
16. Mi Locura [Street Mix] (feat. Noriega)
17. Vamo' Allá - (feat. Jenay, Gavilan, Don Chezina, Cosculluela, Yomo) (diss to Héctor el Father)
18. Is This Love (Es Amor) (Bob Marley cover)
