= Los K-Becillas =

Studio album by Master Joe & O.G. Black
- Released: May 10, 2005
- Recorded: 2004
- Genre: Reggaeton
- Length: 56:42
- Label: Ole Music
- Producer: DJ Sonic, Rafy Mercenario, X-Zibit, DJ Urba, DJ Joe, DJ Fat, DJ Blaster, Sosa

Master Joe & O.G. Black chronology
Sabotage (2004)	Los K-Becillas (2005)	Gold Series Vol.1 (2013)

Singles from Los K-Becillas
- 1. "D'Abuso" Released: 2005; 2. "Mil Amores" Released: 2005; 3. "Matadora (feat. O'Neill)" Released: 2005

Los K-Becillas ("The Bosses" in English) is a 2005 album by Master Joe & O.G. Black. It is the last album that Master Joe and OG Black work on because they broke up. It is the most successful album to date and peaked at 17 in Top Latin Albums and 37 in Top Heatseekers. Los K-Becillas was nominated for a Lo Nuestro Award for Urban Album of the Year.

== Track listing ==
1. D' Abuso
2. Mil Amores
3. Actúa (feat. Lennox, Newtone)
4. ¿Dónde Te Gusta? (feat. Speedy)
5. Los Bravos (feat. Don Chezina) diss to Don Omar
6. Déjala Que Caiga (feat. Yomo)
7. La Hija de Tuta
8. Fantasía (feat. Lil' Sean)
9. Matadora (feat. O'Neill)
10. Acribíllala (feat. Denual)
11. Por Donde Les Duele diss to Hector El Father
12. Gata Psycho (feat. Yaviell)
13. La Malta
14. Mil Amores [Bachata Version]
15. Banshee Robao (feat. Yerai y Warionex)
