= Gold Series Vol.2 =

Compilation album by Master Joe & O.G. Black
- Released: October 21, 2014
- Genre: Reggaeton
- Label: Diamond Collections

Master Joe & O.G. Black chronology
Gold Series Vol.1 (2013)	Gold Series Vol.2 (2014)

Gold Series Vol.2 is the last album from Master Joe & O.G. Black. It is a collection of the best hits by the duo.

== Track listing ==
1. Mil Amores
2. El Aroma De Tu Piel
3. Si Tu No Me Llamas
4. La Hija De Tuta
5. Oh Gial !
6. El Fake De La Esperanza
7. Aguajera
8. Entra Sin Ropa (feat. Sir Speedy)
9. Rompe Y Vacila
10. Llego La Hora
11. Celosa
12. Sorpresa (feat. Maicol & Manuel)
13. Sigo Vivo
14. Bien Arrebatao
15. Legalicen
