= Los Rabanes =

Musical ensemble from Panama

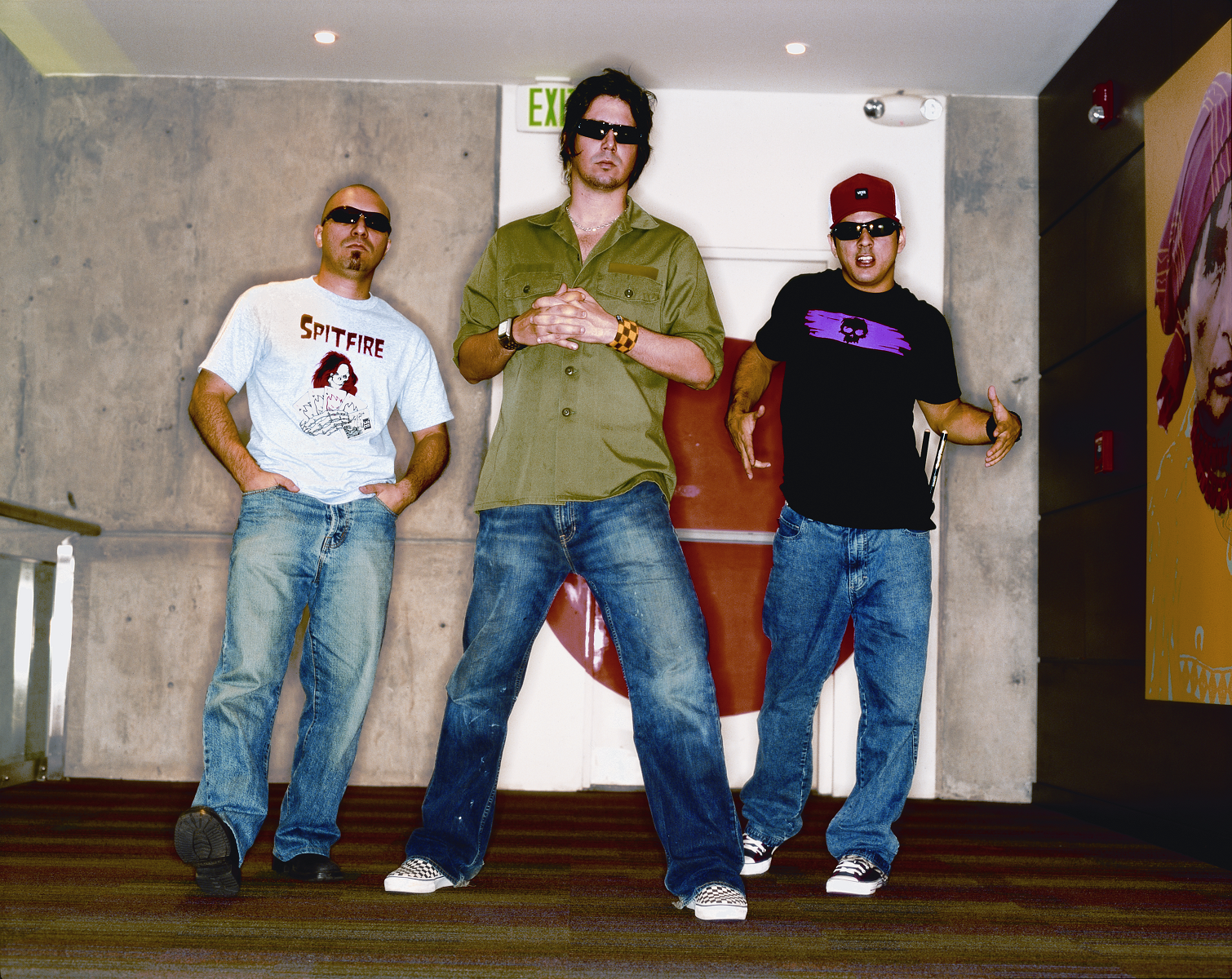

Background information
- Origin: Chitré, Panama
- Genres: Ska punk; punk rock
- Years active: 1992–present
- Labels: Kiwi; Sony; Universal; Rockass Online Music
- Members: Emilio Regueira; Christian Torres; Javier Saavedra; Randy Cuevas
- Website: losrabanesoficial.com

Los Rabanes is a Latin Grammy winning ska rock fusion band from Chitré, Herrera, Panama. With a career spanning two decades and eight albums, they are considered pioneers in the region, and are the first band from Central America to win a Latin Grammy in the Best Rock Album Category.

== Style ==
The lyrical style of Los Rabanes is a mix between Panamanian Spanish and English. Even if some choruses are fully or partly in English, most of the lyrics in the songs are in Spanish, using English only to express sarcasm, satire or parody.

== History ==
After the breakup of their bands "Rum & Coke" and "El Décimo Piso" in the early 1990s, childhood friends Emilio Regueira, Christian Torres and Javier Saavedra began playing in small pubs and bars during the weekends in Chitré, Herrera, in 1992. Those early shows made a big impact in the local scene, for their energy, and their extravagant stage appearance. In 1995, former drummer and current manager of Los Rabanes, joined the team. This brought a reorganization that included demos and presentations in Panama City, which produced even a stronger impact than they had in the Central Provinces.

In 1994, with only one demo and one song on the radio, they joined the first ever "Rock Nacional" tour, which included all the biggest rock bands in Panama. In 1995, their increasing popularity gave them the opportunity to tour Panama and even open for major acts like Maná. By the end of the year, they released their debut album “¿Por Qué Te Fuiste Benito?”, with the video for the title track playing heavily on MTV Latino.

In 1996, Los Rabanes toured Latin America sharing the stage with bands like Los Fabulosos Cadillacs, Los Autenticos Decadentes, Todos Tus Muertos, Aterciopelados, Maldita Vecindad, and were chosen by the press of California as the Best New Rock band in Spanish.

In 1997, they released their second album, “Los Rabanes All Star – Volumen 2”. The album, recorded in Panama and mixed in Argentina, had Flavio Cianciarulo from Los Fabulosos Cadillacs as producer, and Rubén Blades as a guest on vocals. The three singles from this album were “Reggae Punk Panamá”, “De Colores”, featuring Rubén Blades on the video, and the song “Tú Me Disparas Balas”, for which the video received major airplay on MTV Latino.

In 1998, they played at major festivals like Festimad, which featured Metallica, and played shows in Latin America and the US with Café Tacvba, Los Fabulosos Cadillacs, and Control Machete. During the first half of 2000, Los Rabanes recorded their third album with Roberto Blades on artistic production and Emilio Estefan Jr. in general production. The album, recorded in Crescent Moon studios in Miami Florida, combines Punk, Calypso, Reggae, ska, and hip hop, with a lot of spanglish and meringue house, adding some wind instruments and Latin percussion. The video for the first single “My Commanding Wife” was shot in Miami and directed by Emilio Estefan Jr. The song, "My Commanding Wife," was derived from the song, "My Commanding Wife," written by the Panamanian calypso artist, Oscar Reid, and recorded by Leroy Gittens and Oscar Reid Y Su Combo in 1965. The song was later popularized by Jamaican recording artist, Boris Gardiner and his band, The Boris Gardiner Happening, in 1970.

In 2002, the band releases their fourth album, “Money Pa’ Que”, their second album with Emilio Estefan Jr. as producer, for Crescent Moon Records. The album was also co-produced by Emilio Regueira and Sebastián Krys. The first single, “Everybody”, is a mix between rap, hip-hop, meringue huse, reggae and samba, and it had two additional remixes. The song was also a part of a compilation of Latin artists released in Asia for the Korea-Japan World Cup in 2002. The album also earned Los Rabanes their first Latin Grammy Nomination in the Best Vocal Rock Duo or Group category. The award went to Maná. In 2006, the band ends their contract with Crescent Moon and Emilio Estefan Jr. and released a greatest hits box set called “10 años sonando”, with two CDs and a DVD. In 2007, they signed to Universal Music and released their sixth studio album, “Kamikaze”, produced by Sebastian Krys.

On November 8, 2007, Kamikaze wins the band the Latin Grammy Award for Rock Album by a Duo or Group with vocal. The album was also nominated for the general Grammys as Best Latin Album. After the Grammy, they released two more singles from “Kamikaze”, “La Ganja” and a remake of the Eddy Grany classic “Electric Avenue”. Recently, Los Rabanes have worked with reggaeton artists like Don Omar, Aldo Ranks and Ñejo & Dalmata and with Dancehall artists like Kafu Banton & Fidel Nadal They also worked with reggaeton producer El Chombo in a song that was featured in the album Los Cuentos De La Cripta. In 2013 they release their seventh studio album, “Urban Rock”, featuring collaborations with Flex for the single “Why Not?” and Miguel Ángel Tesis in “Dime Que Tú Quieres”.

In 2015, they released a new album live, “En Directo” “Rabanes Live” produced by Rockass Online Music, recorded and mastered by Mike Mulet, son of trumpeter Teddy Mulet of Miami Sound Machine, the album was recorded in Puerto Rico .

In March 2015, they participated into the renowned Festival in Bogota- Colombia, “Vive el Planeta”, that year part of the World Summit on Arts and Culture in Bogota. Los Rabanes were the Headliners for over 10.000 People, sharing stage with important bands from Latin America.

In April 2015, they perform in the last tour of the biggest Panamanian artist singer, songwriter, actor, musician, activist, and politician “Ruben Blades” who has won seven Grammy awards and five Latin Grammy Awards. Rabanes was the only band invited in his tour, that was called the last show and thanks for all his career. In July, Los Rabanes were selected to participate as soundtrack for the Peruvian film; “La Herencia” directed by Gastón Vizcarra (Perú), with the song “Ya No te Lloro Mas”.

In November 2015 they released a new album, “Rabanes Live” produced by Rockass Online Music, recorded and mastered in Puerto Rico by Mike Mulet, son of trumpeter Teddy Mulet of Miami Sound Machine. “Rabanes Live” mixes different styles and stages the band has gone through with fusion of ska, punk, dance hall, Panamanian and Caribbean folk sounds. It included best hits such as: “Señorita a mi me gusta su Style”, “My Commanding Wife”, “Perfidia”, “Bam Bam” “La Vida” and others.

In December 2015, they participated in the biggest Rock Festival in Perú “Vivo Por El Rock”, for over 60.000 people, they share stage with SUM41 (Canadá), Collective Soul (US), Molotov (México), Mago de Oz (Spain), Sepultura (Brazil) among others. At the end of 2015 they were selected for a compilation album release in Europe with the song “Perro Ladrón”, the album is called “La Rockola Insert Coin.”

In 2016, they were selected to participate with the song “Perro Ladrón” as part of the soundtrack for the Colombian Film “ Estrategia de Una Venganza” (2016), directed by Carlos Varela.

== Members ==
- Emilio Regueira Pérez – vocals, guitar / (founder)
- Christian "Pipón" Torres – vocals, bass guitar / (founder)
- Javier Saavedra – drums / (founder)
- Randy "Salsa" Cuevas – keyboards

== Discography ==
- 1996: ¿Por Qué Te Fuiste Benito?
- 1997: All Star – Volume 2
- 2000: Los Rabanes
- 2002: Money Pa' Qué?
- 2004: Ecolecua
- 2007: Kamikaze
- 2011: Demons On Fire
