= Broke & Famous =

Studio album by Ñejo & Dálmata
- Released: December 11, 2007
- Recorded: 2006–2007
- Genre: Reggaeton
- Length: 1 hr. 16 min.
- Labels: Universal Latino; Urban
- Producers: DJ Nelson; Eliot el Mago De Oz; Marioso; Tainy; Danny Fornaris; Nely; DJ Memo; Santana

Broke & Famous is the debut album released by the reggaeton duo Ñejo & Dálmata. It was released on December 11, 2007. It has 21 tracks, 4 featuring guest stars like Tego Calderón, Julio Voltio, Arcángel, Los Rabanes, LT, and Chyno Nyno.

== Track listing ==
#	Title	Performer(s)	Featured Guest(s)
1	"Intro (Broke & Famous)"	Ñejo & Dálmata	
2	"Hoy Me Atrevo"	Ñejo & Dálmata	
3	"Mírala"	Dálmata	
4	"Un Call"	Ñejo	
5	"Algo Musical"	Ñejo & Dálmata	Arcángel
6	"See You Mami (Reggaeton)"	Dálmata	
7	"Yo Quisiera"	Ñejo	
8	"Miénteme"	Dálmata	
9	"Por Allá Donde Vivo"	Ñejo	
10	"Mi Día De Suerte"	Dálmata	
11	"Mundo Artificial"	Ñejo & Dálmata	Chyno Nyno & LT
12	"Así Es la Vida"	Ñejo	
13	"Pasarela" (Panama Rock remix)	Dálmata	Los Rabanes
14	"No Es lo Mismo"	Ñejo	Tego Calderón & Voltio
15	"Se Va, Se Va"	Dálmata	
16	"Como Los Quiero"	Ñejo	
17	"Triste y Sola"	Ñejo & Dálmata	
18	"Sexo en la Playa"	Dálmata	
19	"Violento"	Ñejo	
20	"Pasarela"	Dálmata	
21	"No Quiere Novio"	Ñejo	

== Chart performance ==
Chart (2007–2008)	Peak position
U.S. Billboard Latin Rhythm Albums	8
U.S. Billboard Top Heatseekers (South Atlantic)	9
