= Gadiel =

Gadiel is both a given name and a surname. Notable people with the name include:

- An archangel in Jewish and Christian mysticism. Known as an angel of holiness and love.
- Gadiel, recording artist; see WY Records
- Gadiel Figueroa Robles (born 1986), football (soccer) player
- Gadiel Miranda, judoka
- Tanya Gadiel (née Barber) (born 1972), a former Australian politician
