= Wolfine =

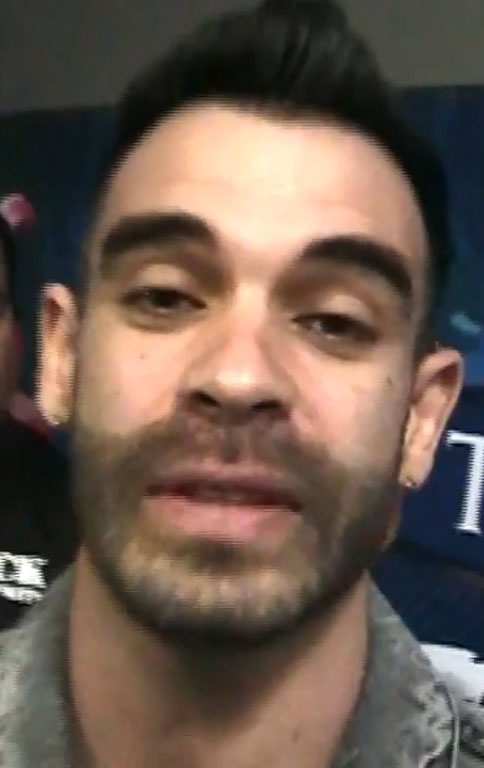
- Colombian singer Wolfine during his interview with El Heraldo

Background information
- Also known as: Wolfine
- Born: Andrés Felipe Zapata Gaviria; December 21, 1978 (age 47); Medellín, Colombia
- Genres: Reggaeton, hip hop, latin pop
- Occupations: Singer, songwriter
- Instrument: Vocals
- Years active: 1998–present
- Labels: Codiscos
- Website: Official website

Andrés Felipe Zapata Gaviria (born December 21, 1978), who performs under the name Wolfine, is a Colombian singer and composer. He has recorded with international artists such as Ñengo Flow, Julio Voltio, Kafu Banton, Nicky Jam, King Chesta, Thirstin Howl, among others.

After several years away from music, Wolfine returned in 2017 with "Bella", a hit single that became a viral success globally, gaining over 300 million streams on Spotify and 790 million views on YouTube, making it his most commercially successful song throughout his career. The song has also peaked on #12 on Billboard Latin Pop Airplay.

== Early life ==
He was born in Medellín on December 21, 1978. He is the oldest of three brothers who only saw each other once a year. "We were a very plague. When they punished us, they locked us in the house, and we went out through the roof." He grew up in the most dangerous time in Medellín. Now, being an adult, he prefers not to go there.

His father was a pharmaceutical chemist who had a drugstore in the Castilla district. His mom was one of the first to have a hot dog cart in Medellín. Wolfine went out with her and her two brothers, they used to take electricity out of the house with a long cable and they set about selling dogs the entire day.

The first record he produced was a CD with two singles that gave him "Scarface: The Untouchable" and "Smile". Initially, He had no place to play the CD, until He bought a tape recorder that paid him in installments to a neighbor.

The CD had the song and the track, and the young man began to sing without knowing what it meant. Until today he learns that untouchable means untouchable. Funkat was struck by the music of the trolley and began recording Wolfine more music on cassettes and telling stories of the protagonists of rap. Then he started recording songs with his mother's recorder and the Scarface CD track, he heard the melody and he wrote songs in Spanish.

In 1998 Wolfine had his beginnings in Medellín in groups such as (Komplot, RH Klandestino and Kafeina), participating in the most important festivals in Colombia, achieving great public acceptance for his great energy on stage; The Colombian also becomes one of the first urban artists to achieve the rotation of two of his videos on Latin MTV.

== Music career ==
Wolfine ventures into acting in 2008, forming part of the film "Hoy Martes" as co-star with the role of "eyebrows" this was shot in Medellín, with the participation of well-known actors like Álvaro Rodríguez, who made "El Mocho" from "El Cartel de los Toads". Later he released his first reggaetón song called "Si Te Toco", becoming the number one song in Medellín for several months, conquering the urban youth audience.

== Discography ==
- 2013: La Versatilidad De La Calle
- 2019: Super Hits

=== As lead artist ===
List of singles as lead artist, with selected chart positions and certifications, showing year released and album name
Title	Year	Peak chart positions							Certifications	Album
Title	Year	COL	ARG	CHI	MEX	SPA	US Latin Airplay	US Latin Pop	Certifications	Album
"Sin Ti"	2015	—	—	—	—	—	—	—		Non-album singles
"Talento de Su Mama"	2016	—	—	—	—	—	—	—		Non-album singles
"Te Fallé"	2016	—	—	—	—	—	—	—		Non-album singles
"Julieta" (featuring Ñengo Flow)	2016	—	—	—	—	—	—	—		Non-album singles
"Jaula de Oro"	2016	—	—	—	—	—	—	—		Non-album singles
"A Mi Manera"	2016	—	—	—	—	—	—	—		Non-album singles
"Cerquita"	2017	—	—	—	—	—	—	—		TBA
"Motivame"	2017	—	—	—	—	—	—	—		TBA
"Bella" (solo or with Maluma)	2017	4	3	2	9	8	22	12	AMPROFON: Gold; CAPIF: Platinum; IFPI CHI: Platinum; PROMUSICAE: Platinum	TBA
"Le Pido A Dios"	2018	—	—	—	—	—	—	—		TBA
"—" denotes a recording that did not chart or was not released in that territory.
