= List of number-one Billboard Hot Tropical Songs of 2006 =

The Billboard Tropical Songs chart is a chart that ranks the best-performing tropical songs of the United States. Published by Billboard magazine, the data are compiled by Nielsen Broadcast Data Systems based on each single's weekly airplay.

== Chart history ==
Issue date	Song	Artist	Ref
January 7	"Rompe"	Daddy Yankee	
January 14	"Rompe"	Daddy Yankee	
January 21	"Rompe"	Daddy Yankee	
January 28	"Rompe"	Daddy Yankee	
February 4	"Rompe"	Daddy Yankee	
February 11	"Rompe"	Daddy Yankee	
February 18	"Anda y ve"	Akwid	
February 25	"Tu amor me hace bien"	Marc Anthony	
March 4	"Princesa"	Frank Reyes	
March 11	"Tu amor me hace bien"	Marc Anthony	
March 18	"Princesa"	Frank Reyes	
March 25	"Princesa"	Frank Reyes	
April 1	"Llamé pa' verte"	Wisin & Yandel	
April 8	"Lo que son las cosas"	Anaís	
April 15	"Lo que me gusta a mí"	Juanes	
April 22	"Caile"	Tito el Bambino	
April 29	"Caile"	Tito el Bambino	
May 6	"Caile"	Tito el Bambino	
May 13	"Caile"	Tito el Bambino	
May 20	"Caile"	Tito el Bambino	
May 27	"Caile"	Tito el Bambino	
June 3	"Caile"	Tito el Bambino	
June 10	"Caile"	Tito el Bambino	
June 17	"Nuestro amor se ha vuelto ayer"	Víctor Manuelle Featuring Yuridia	
June 24	"Nuestro amor se ha vuelto ayer"	Víctor Manuelle Featuring Yuridia	
July 1	"Angelito"	Don Omar	
July 8	"Nuestro amor se ha vuelto ayer"	Víctor Manuelle Featuring Yuridia	
July 15	"No es una novela"	Monchy & Alexandra	
July 22	"Down"	Rakim & Ken-Y	
July 29	"Angelito"	Don Omar	
August 5	"Labios compartidos"	Maná	
August 12	"No es una novela"	Monchy & Alexandra	
August 19	"No es una novela"	Monchy & Alexandra	
August 26	"¿Qué precio tiene el cielo?"	Marc Anthony	
September 2	"¿Qué precio tiene el cielo?"	Marc Anthony	
September 9	"¿Qué precio tiene el cielo?"	Marc Anthony	
September 16	"¿Qué precio tiene el cielo?"	Marc Anthony	
September 23	"¿Qué precio tiene el cielo?"	Marc Anthony	
September 30	"¿Qué precio tiene el cielo?"	Marc Anthony	
October 7	"¿Qué precio tiene el cielo?"	Marc Anthony	
October 14	"¿Qué precio tiene el cielo?"	Marc Anthony	
October 21	"¿Qué precio tiene el cielo?"	Marc Anthony	
October 28	"¿Qué precio tiene el cielo?"	Marc Anthony	
November 4	"Pam Pam"	Wisin & Yandel	
November 11	"¿Qué precio tiene el cielo?"	Marc Anthony	
November 18	"¿Qué precio tiene el cielo?"	Marc Anthony	
November 25	"¿Qué precio tiene el cielo?"	Marc Anthony	
December 2	"Los infieles"	Aventura	
December 9	"Los infieles"	Aventura	
December 16	"Los hombres tienen la culpa"	Don Omar Featuring Gilberto Santa Rosa	
December 23	"Los hombres tienen la culpa"	Don Omar Featuring Gilberto Santa Rosa	
December 30	"Los infieles"	Aventura	

== See also ==
- List of number-one Billboard Hot Tropical Songs of 2007
- List of number-one Billboard Hot Latin Songs of 2006
- List of number-one Billboard Hot Latin Pop Airplay of 2006
