= Flow Music =

Puerto Rican record label founded by DJ Nelson

- Parent company: Universal Music Group
- Founded: 1996; 30 years ago
- Founder: DJ Nelson
- Distributor: Universal Music Latino
- Genre: Reggaeton
- Country of origin: Puerto Rico

Flow Music is a Puerto Rican record label founded by DJ Nelson specializing in the reggaeton genre.

== Associated Labels ==
- On Top Of The World Music
- GLAD EMPIRE
- Dynamic Records
- Flow La Movie
- EMPIRE

== Artists ==
- DJ Nelson
- Jay Wheeler
- Leebrian
- Maare
- Alberto Stytlee

== Producers ==
- DJ Nelson

== Former Artists ==
- Andy Boy
- Ñejo & Dalmata
- Las Guanabanas
- Joan & O'Neill
- Gringo
- Dandy & Aldo
- Wibal & Alex
- K-Mil
- Lui-G 21+
- J Alvarez
- Chris G "El Soldado"
- Jhony Ou
- Nio Garcia
- Onell Diaz
- Shaka Black & Yazunori
- Anonimus
- Paul Díaz
- Gio Rosse

== Former Producers ==
- Luny Tunes
- DJ Memo
- Marioso "El Ingeniero Musical"
- Elliot "El Mago de Oz"
- Dimitri "El Boss"
- DJ Jamsha
- Noriega
- DJ Wassie
- Montana "The Producer"
- KARBeats

== Albums Released by Flow Music ==
- 1997 Nel-Zone (DJ Nelson)
- 1997 The Flow (DJ Nelson)
- 1998 Back to Reality (Las Guanabanas)
- 1999 Back to Reality 2 (Las Guanabanas)
- 2001 Music (DJ Nelson)
- 2003 Mas Flow (Luny Tunes & Noriega)
- 2004 Flow la Discoteka (DJ Nelson)
- 2004 Collection Two (Las Guanabanas)
- 2004 La Trayectoria (Luny Tunes)
- 2004 Contra la Corriente (Noriega)
- 2005 The Flow: Sweet Dreams (Special Edition) (DJ Nelson)
- 2007 Flow la Discoteka 2 (DJ Nelson)
- 2007 El Independiente (Gringo) (Baby Rasta & Gringo)
- 2007 Broke & Famous (Ñejo & Dalmata)
- 2008 Broke & Famous: Still Broke the Mixtape (Ñejo & Dalmata)
- 2009 El Dueño Del Sistema (J Alvarez)
- 2009 El Dueño Del Sistema (Special Edition) (J Alvarez)
- 2010 El Movimiento (The Mixtape) (J Alvarez)
- 2010 El BokiSucio (The Mixtape) (Lui-G 21+)
- 2011 El Soldado (The Mixtape) (Chris G)
- 2011 Otro Nivel De Musica (J Alvarez)
- 2012 Otro Nivel De Música Reloaded (J Alvarez)
- 2012 El Patán (Lui-G 21+)
- 2012 El Soldado The Álbum (Chris G)
- 2012 Los Bionikos World Edition (Wibal & Alex)
- 2013 Step By Step (The Mixtape) (Yoseph The One)
- 2013 Chasing Papi (Jhony-Ou)
- 2013 La Buya: Flow Music Hits (DJ Nelson)
- 2013 El Anonimato (Anonimus)
- 2013 1k El Futuro (J Alvarez) y Gaby Metálico
- 2014 De Camino Pa La Cima (J Alvarez)
- 2014 I am Anonimus (Anonimus)
- 2014 Perreke Presenta: La Makinaria Vol.1 (Perreke & Onell Flow)
- 2014 Perreke Presenta: La Makinaria Vol.2 (Perreke & Onell Flow)
- 2015 De Camino Pa' La Cima Reloaded (J Alvarez)
- 2016 Los que Gustan (Klasico)

== Albums Coming Soon ==
Flow La Discoteka 3 (Dj Nelson & Onellflow)
