= Otro Nivel De Música =

2011 studio album by J Álvarez

Studio album by J Álvarez
- Released: September 20, 2011; May 1, 2012 (Reloaded edition)
- Recorded: 2009–2011
- Genre: Reggaeton
- Label: Universal Music Latino
- Producer: DJ Nelson

J Álvarez chronology
El Movimiento (2010)	Otro Nivel De Música (2011)

Singles from Otro Nivel De Musica
- 1. "La Pregunta" Released: 2011

Otro Nivel De Musica Reloaded
- Otro Nivel De Musica Reloaded cover

Otro Nivel de Música is the first studio album released by reggaeton artist J Álvarez on September 20, 2011 through Universal Music Latino.

== Track listing ==
Track #	Title	Featured Artist(s)	Length
1	Junto Al Amanecer		4:11
2	Regalame Una Noche	Arcángel	4:10
3	Ahi Eh		3:49
4	Carita Angelical		4:29
5	La Pregunta		4:29
6	Se Hace La Dificil	Voltio	3:57
7	Mas Dinero, Mas Mujeres, Mas Drama		4:03
8	La Desordena		3:35
9	Ponte Pa' Mi		3:29
10	Dejalo Todo Atras		4:23
11	Sera Tu Corte		3:17
12	Sexo, Sudor Y Calor	Ñejo & Dalmata	3:47
13	Welcome To The Party		4:13
14	La Falda Roja		3:52
15	Dejame Llegar		3:30
16	Bailarina		4:10
17	Quedate Aqui	Eliot "El Mago De Oz"	3:39
18	Nada Es Eterno		4:22
19	Junto Al Amanecer (Salsa Version) [Bonus Track]		4:21
20	Date Un Trago [Bonus Track]		3:53

=== Remixes ===
Track #	Title	Featured Artist(s)	Length
1	Junto Al Amanecer [Remix]	Daddy Yankee	4:35
2	Sexo, Sudor Y Calor [Remix]	Ñejo & Dalmata, Zion & Lennox	5:26
3	La Pregunta [Remix]	Tito El Bambino & Daddy Yankee	4:35

== Otro Nivel De Musica (Reloaded) ==
On May 1, 2012 a special edition named Otro Nivel De Musica (Reloaded) was released. It added 15 new tracks and was produced by DJ Nelson.

This special edition was nominated for the Latin Grammy Award for Best Urban Music Album.

== Track listing ==
Track #	Title	Featured Artist(s)	Length
1	Intro - Por Encima De Ti		2:46
2	Esperandote	Arcángel	3:35
3	Hoy Desperté		4:22
4	Aqui Se Va Quedar	Jory	2:34
5	Tu Aroma		3:32
6	Alucinandote	Zion & Lennox	4:15
7	Actúa		3:31
8	No Demores	Farruko	3:40
9	La Pregunta		4:34
10	La Musica Es Vida		3:35
11	Siempre Anda En La De Ella		4:23
12	Sexo Y Vacilon		3:30
13	Buscandole La Vuelta		2:59
14	Si Te Sientes Sola		3:30
15	After Party	Yaga & Mackie	4:08
16	Carita Angelical		4:30
17	Mas Dinero, Mas Mujeres, Mas Drama		4:03
18	Nada Es Eterno		4:22
19	Tremenda Loca	Naldo	3:39
20	Carta Pa'l Primo		4:58

== Charts ==
Chart (2012)	Peak position
US Top Latin Albums (Billboard)	36
US Latin Rhythm Albums (Billboard)	2
