= Jenay =

Puerto Rican reggaeton artist (1977–2019)

- Birth name: Edwin Batista Otero
- Born: 1977; Toa Alta, Puerto Rico
- Died: August 11, 2019 (aged 41–42); Toa Alta, Puerto Rico
- Genres: Reggaeton
- Occupation: Rapper
- Instrument: Vocals
- Labels: Pina Records

Edwin Batista Otero, better known musically as Jenay, was a Puerto Rican reggaeton artist.

Jenay worked with singers such as Ñengo Flow, Ozuna, Trebol Clan, Juanka, and others.

== Death ==
Jenay was killed in a Ford Explorer, consequence of a drive-by shooting at the age of 42 in Villa del Toa in Toa Alta, Puerto Rico in 2019. There were 80 bags of marijuana in the car where he was found with multiple gunshot wounds. His death was lamented by various artists such as Noriel, J Álvarez, Nio Garcia, and others.
