= De Camino Pa' La Cima =

Fourth studio album by J Álvarez

Studio album by J Álvarez
- Released: February 18, 2014
- Recorded: 2013
- Genre: Reggaeton
- Label: On Top of the World Music, Sony Music Latin

J Álvarez chronology
Otro Nivel De Música (2011)	De Camino Pa' La Cima (2014)	Big Yauran (2016)

De Camino Pa' La Cima is the fourth studio album by Puerto Rican reggaeton singer-songwriter J Álvarez. It was released by On Top of the World Music, and exclusively distributed by Sony Music Entertainment on February 18, 2014. A "reloaded" edition entitled De Camino Pa' La Cima (Reloaded 2.0) was released in 2015.

The album debuted at the #1 position on the Billboard Latin Rhythm Albums and held that spot for about a month. It features collaborations from Cosculluela, Zion, Mackie, Baby Rasta & Gringo, Divino, Tego Calderon, Wisin, De La Ghetto, and Jowell & Randy.

== Track listing ==
No.	Title	Length
1.	"Te Cambiamos El Juego"	3:27
2.	"El Duelo"	3:05
3.	"Como Nunca"	3:21
4.	"Háblame de Ti"	3:17
5.	"Quiere Llegar" (Featuring Zion)	3:11
6.	"La Cita"	3:44
7.	"Buscándote" (Featuring Mackie)	3:24
8.	"Hacerte Volar"	3:54
9.	"La Temperatura"	3:05
10.	"Amor en Práctica"	2:48
11.	"Mirándonos"	2:43
12.	"Siempre Me Llamas"	4:22
13.	"Un Poco Más"	3:14
14.	"Cómo Explicarte"	3:36
15.	"Dándote Calor"	3:27
16.	"Dale Uso" (Featuring D.Ozi, Luigi 21 Plus Y Maximus Wel)	4:08
17.	"Hoy Se Bebe"	3:29
18.	"Tu Primera Vez"	3:24
19.	"La Película" (Featuring Cosculluela)	4:01
20.	"Quiero Hacértelo" (Featuring Tego Calderon)	2:56
21.	"Quiero Olvidar"	3:30
22.	"Te Imagino" (Featuring Baby Rasta & Gringo Y Divino)	4:33
23.	"Brindemos"	3:58
24.	"Cuerpo de Sirena"	3:13
25.	"Navegarte"	3:28
26.	"Lentamente" (Featuring Jowell y Randy, Zion y Lennox)	3:47
27.	"Extranándote"	3:07
28.	"En la Discoteca"	3:30
29.	"No la Dejes Caer" (Featuring Carlitos Rossy)	3:22
30.	"No Es lo Mismo"	3:28
31.	"Caribbean Girls" (Featuring Vakero)	3:31
32.	"La Temperatura [Remix]" (Featuring Wisin)	3:39
33.	"Nadie Como Yo" (Featuring De La Ghetto)	4:02

== Remixes ==
No.	Title	Length
1.	"El Duelo [Remix]" (Featuring Plan B)	3:24
2.	"Amor en Práctica [Remix]" (Featuring Jory, Maluma Y Ken-Y)	4:03
4.	"Quiere Llegar [Remix]" (Featuring Zion y Lennox)	3:44
5.	"La Temperatura [Remix II]" (Featuring Gente De Zona Y Maffio)	4:34
6.	"Quiero Olvidar [Remix]" (Featuring Maluma Y Ken-Y)	3:55

== Charts ==
Chart (2014)	Peak position
US Billboard 200	174
US Top Latin Albums (Billboard)	2
US Latin Rhythm Albums (Billboard)	1
US Top Rap Albums (Billboard)	13
