= Master Joe & O.G. Black =

Dominican and Puerto Rican reggaeton duo

O.G Black & Master Joe
- Origin: Puerto Rico
- Genres: Reggaeton; Latin hip-hop; Puerto Rican hip-hop
- Years active: 1997-2006
- Labels: Dream Team Killer, Pina Records, Ole Music, Diamond Collections

Master Joe (Joel Hernández Rodríguez) and O.G. Black (Adolfo Ramírez Bruno) were a Puerto Rican reggaeton duo. They have released various albums and spawned moderate hits in Puerto Rico. They were part of DJ Joe's Escuadron Del Panico along with Hakeem & Jenay, Ranking Stone, Genio, Guayo Man, Simple Secret, which they manage and Doble Impact, Trebol Clan, and DJ Joe. Their hits include "Bailen Yackien", "Mi Locura (featuring Noriega)", "Mil Amores" and "Matadora". As of 2007, they are no longer a duo.

== Discography ==
=== Studio álbums ===
- Francotiradores (2000)
- Francotiradores 2 (2001)
- Sabotage (2004)
- Los K-Becillas (2005)

=== Compilation álbums ===
- La Coleccion (2003)
- Gold Series Vol.1 (2013)
- Gold Series Vol.2 (2014)

== As O.G. Black ==
- Bajo Tu Observacion (1996) with Q Mac Daddy
- La Hora Cero (March 26, 2009) with Guayo Man "El Bandido"
- Imparable (2013)
- Back To The Underground: El Francotirador Edition (2013)

== As Master Joe ==
- Welcome To My Kingdom (1995)

== Singles ==
- Metimos Las Patas
- Bailen, Yackien
- Bajen Pa' Aca
- Banshee Robao
- Tú Naciste Pa' Mí
- D' Abuso
- Mil Amores
- Matadora
- Me La Imaginaba
