= J Álvarez =

Puerto Rican singer (born 1983)

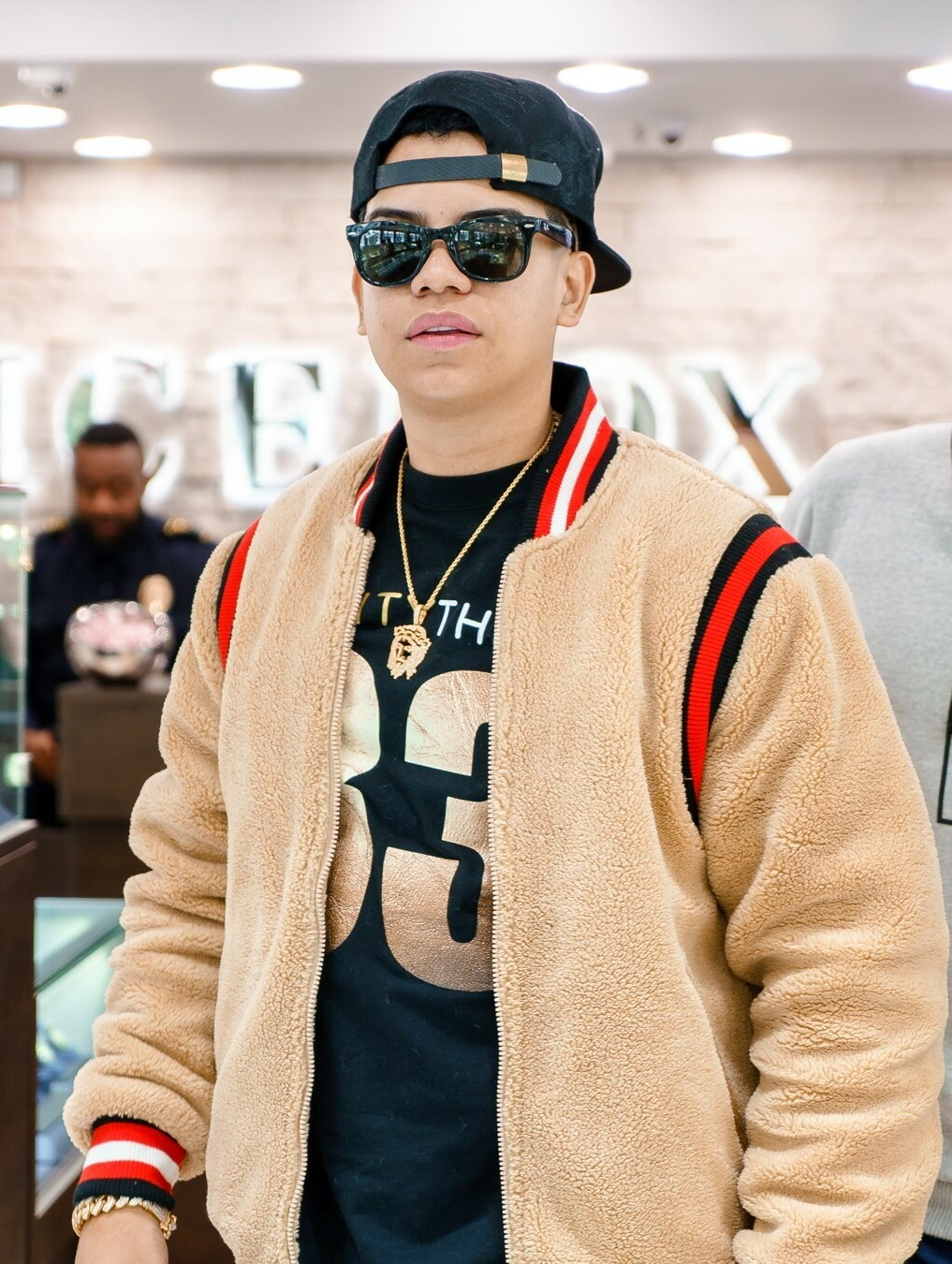
- J Álvarez in 2019

Background information
- Born: Javid David Álvarez Fernández; December 13, 1983 (age 42); Río Piedras, Puerto Rico
- Genres: Reggaeton; Latin trap
- Occupation: Singer
- Instrument: Vocals
- Works: Discography
- Years active: 1997–present
- Labels: Universal Latin; Flow
- Website: jalvarezmusic.com

Javid David Álvarez Fernández (born December 13, 1983), better known by his stage name J Álvarez, is a Puerto Rican reggaeton singer. He is best known for his singles "La Pregunta", "Junto al Amanecer", "Sexo, Sudor y Calor" and "Regálame Una Noche".

== Early life ==
Álvarez was born in Rio Piedras, Puerto Rico. His mother and father are both from the Dominican Republic. When Alvarez was 12 years old he sang in front of several of his classmates and teachers, his first-ever song "Lo Que Ella Trae" (What She Brings).

As a child, he listened to many reggaeton and hip hop artists, and his music was inspired by Tego Calderon and Busta Rhymes.

In 2004, he was arrested for selling drugs in Puerto Rico. He was sentenced to 10 years in prison, but served only 43 months of it due to his good behavior. His reasoning for selling drugs was that he needed to provide for his family.

He played basketball in his youth but decided to pursue a musical career instead.

== Musical career ==
=== 2009-2010: Career beginnings and early mixtapes ===
Via a connection through his cousin, Álvarez secured a meeting with DJ Nelson, and a working chemistry soon emerged between the two. He was then signed to Flow Music in 2009, and later that year, his debut mixtape El Dueño Del Sistema was released, which included collaborations with several high-profile artists such as De La Ghetto, Jowell & Randy, and Ñejo & Dalmata. He followed this release with a second mixtape, titled El Movimiento: The Mixtape, which was released on September 12, 2010.

=== 2011-2015: Otro Nivel de Musica and De Camino Pa' La Cima ===
Otro Nivel De Musica, his debut studio album, was released on September 20, 2011, and featured the hit singles "La Pregunta" and "Junto Al Amanecer", which both charted on the Billboard Hot Latin Songs chart and became the singer's first songs to chart. A special edition was later released on May 1, 2012, titled Otro Nivel De Musica Reloaded. This album was very well received among fans and was nominated for Best Urban Music Album at the 2012 Latin Grammy Awards. In 2014, "La Pregunta" was nominated for Urban Song of the Year at the 26th Lo Nuestro Awards.

On February 18, 2014, he released his second studio album entitled De Camino Pa' La Cima, which would debut at No. 2 in its second week on Top Latin Albums, and reached the top spot on the Latin Rhythm Albums chart. It features collaborations from Mackie, Zion, and Daddy Yankee. On January 27, 2015, J Álvarez released De Camino Pa' La Cima Reloaded, his fourth studio album, which features Cosculluela and Wisin. This album also reached the No. 1 spot on Top Latin Rhythm Albums and held that position for about a month.

=== 2016-2020: Big Yauran albums, La Fama Que Camina, and El Jonson ===
In September 2016, he released his third studio album, Big Yauran, which reached the number 8 spot on Top Latin Rhythm Albums. In addition, one of the singles which appeared on the album, "Haters", charted on Hot Latin Songs.

In March 2018, he released his certified gold fourth album titled La Fama Que Camina, which includes charting singles such as "Esa Boquita", "De La Mia Personal", and "Rico Suave".

In November 2018, the Recording Industry Association of America certified that the single "De La Mia Personal" had reached platinum status.

On April 24, 2019, Álvarez headlined the Billboard Sounds Showcase in Las Vegas. On March 5, 2021, he collaborated on a single titled "Billete" with Marie Monti and Mariah Angeliq.

On July 1, 2020, he released his fifth studio album titled El Jonson (Side A). Later on September 11, 2020 he released El Jonson (Side B).

=== 2020-present: El Toque de Midas and Barrio Colombia ===
On June 10, 2022, he released El Toque de Midas.

On June 29, 2023, he released Barrio Colombia. Later on August 8, 2024, he release an EP called Barrio Colombia 2.

== Discography ==
- Otro Nivel De Música (2011)
- De Camino Pa' La Cima (2014)
- Big Yauran (2016)
- La Fama Que Camina (2018)
