= Las Guanábanas =

Puerto Rican reggaeton duo

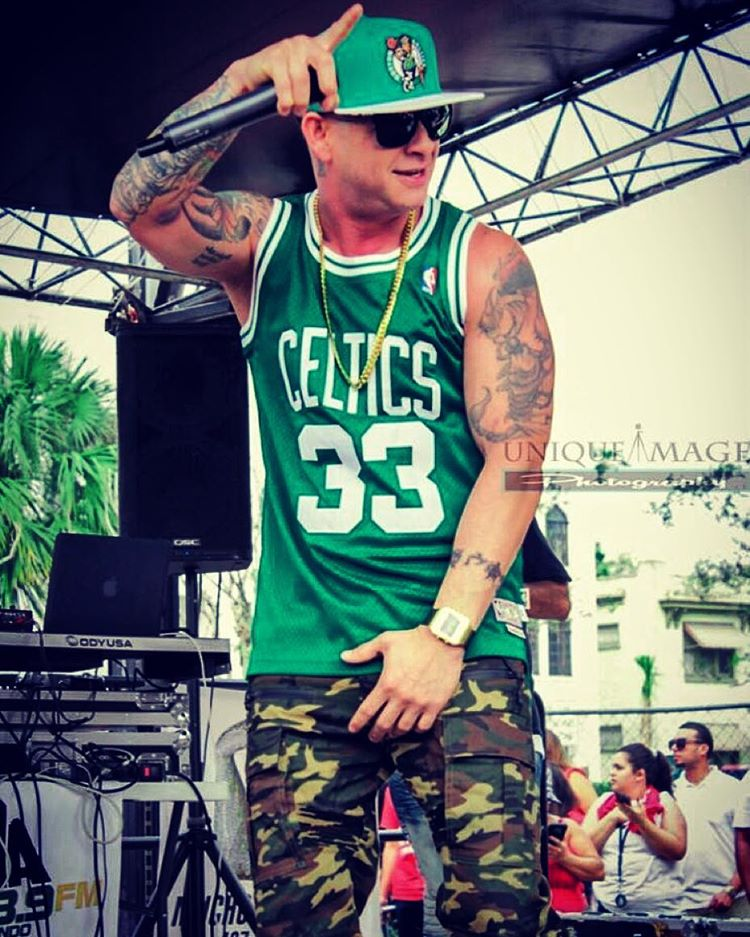

Background information
- Also known as: Los Reyes De La Pichaera
- Origin: Puerto Rico
- Genres: Reggaeton
- Years active: 1992-2006 (as duo); 2006-2016 (Georgie solo)
- Labels: Flow Music, Banaguana Records
- Members: Georgie; Joelito

Las Guanábanas (a.k.a. "Los Reyes De La Pichaera", a.k.a. "Las Guanabanas") were a Puerto Rican reggaeton duo from Villas de Loíza, northeast Puerto Rico. Their names are Georgie and Joelito.

== Career ==
Starting in the world of hip-hop in the late 1980s when they were only engaged breakdancing. In the early 1990s (1992) they had the opportunity to record what was the sequel to the explosion of Puerto Rican hip-hop, as it was the second production of "the Noise." On this tape, they had the opportunity to record about ten minutes, a song that the audience welcomed well by the strong content that was talking about blunts, whores, a ton of bad words (that at that time no one heard of), about "Guillaera", "Bellakeo", "Perreo", things that were not common at that time was very extroverted and full of controversy. For the next years a tragedy, the murder of a close friend called Misael, is what motivates them to write a very deep song and had the opportunity to record it in "The Noise 3" and is nothing more than the song "Amigo" that was a hit and gave an incredible fame to "Las Guanabanas", because their lyrics were very mature for that time and for them that they were Teenagers. People who have follow them through their entire careers have truly seen what this singers have gone through and have seen their evolution in the world of Caribbean Hip-Hop, Rap and Reggaeton. In 1998 they released their first production "Back To Reality" in the hands of Dj Nelson and Flow Music. Then in 1999, they released the sequel "Back to Reality 2".

In 2002, they launched their third production "G-3: Guillaera," although it did not have the same impact as their previous productions for their explicit dirty content, this production was of greater international projection that together with previous songs of the Duo to this date are still played on the radio and are considered classic hits of Reggaeton. They are one of the pioneers in the genre of Reggaeton. They have hits with the most brutal DJs of this genre and to this date, they have worked with many DJs, artists, and producers in the Puerto Rican Hip-Hop & Reggaeton Scene, like Dj Playero, Luny Tunes, Noriega, Baby Rasta & Gringo, Tempo, Daddy Yankee, Arcangel, J Alvarez, Ñejo & Dalmata, Lui-G 21 Plus, Héctor & Tito, Don Chezina, Don Omar (Dominican), Master Joe & O.G. Black, Benyo, Cheka, Zion & Lennox, Yaga & Mackie, Notty Play, Jutha &Small (Colombians), and many more.

Las Guanábanas were the first to bring reggaeton to London and to have fans not only in the Americas and the Caribbean, but also in Germany Italy and Russia. "Pa'lante pa'siempre" "going forward for ever" - Las Guanabanas are not only the pioneers of reggaeton, but also leaders in this genre. Their hits include "Maldita P**a", "Pa' Mis Mujeres Del Mundo", "Busco Una Mujer", "Mi Gatita & Yo", "Vamos Pa La Disco", "Vente Vamos A Bellakear", "Guayandote", "Me Matas", "Ponte Al Dia", "Este Pasto", "UnderGround", "Llama A los Bomberos", "Sexo Na' Mas", "Soltera", "Como Se Lo Ago Yo", "Seductora", "Date Guille", "Ando Ratata"

== Personal lives ==
In the very early stages in an interview with Georgie and Joelito, they were asked about the name of the duo. Joking around, Georgie said Guanabanas Podridas ("Rotten Guanabanas"). Because of the content of their lyrics and ever since, it got stuck with them, they were then locally known as Las Guanabanas Podridas.

Growing up together in Villas De Loíza, Canovanas, P.R. and inseparable in the early trajectory of Las Guanabanas for unknown reasons in 2005 Joelito decides to spend time with his family and get away from the stage, cameras and social media, although there's a lot of rumors about the Duo's relationship they are still good friends and participated together on April 2, 2016 at a show in Puerto Rico what it was the reengagement of all the artist that participated in the albums of "The Noise", in where the videos online are titled "The Noise El Reencuentro".

In 2020, Jorge Berrios, a former member of this group was listed in a podcast of reggaeton artists who have decided to turn against the genre for religious reasons.

== Discography ==
Studio álbums

- 1998: Back To Reality
- 1999: Back To Reality 2
- 2002: Guillaera

Compilation álbums

- 2000: Collection
- 2004: Collection 2:
1. Qué Daría Yo Feat Noriega - (CONTRA LA CORRIENTE 2004) - Noriega
2. Pa Mis Mujeres Del Mundo - (New) - DJ Nelson
3. Vamos A Lo Loco - (New) - DJ Luny Tunes
4. Muévete Feat Noriega - (New Version COLLECTION I 2001) - DJ Nelson y Noriega
5. Tu Mujer Feat Noriega - (New Version ROMANCES DEL RUIDO I 2000) - DJ Nelson y DJ Sonic
6. Azota Tu Cuerpo - (THE SCORE 2003) - DJ Sonic
7. Chica Plastica - (LOS CABALLOTES DEL GENERO 2003) - DJ Sonic - DJ Luny Tunes y Noriega
8. Busco Una Mujer - (MAS FLOW 2003) - DJ Luny Tunes y Noriega
9. Cuando Un Amigo Se Va Feat Hector Y Tito - (BACK TO REALITY 1998) - DJ Nelson
10. Te Exitare (Remix) - (New Version KAKOTEO MIX 2003) - DJ Nelson y DJ Rafy Mercenario y DJ Reflex
11. Pide Mas - (GUILLAERA 2003) - DJ Blass
