= DJ Nelson =

Puerto Rican DJ and producer (born 1972)

- Born: Nelson Díaz Martinez; April 7, 1972 (age 54)
- Origin: San Juan, Puerto Rico
- Genres: Reggaeton; urbano
- Occupations: DJ, record producer
- Years active: 1994–present
- Label: Flow

Nelson Díaz Martinez (born on April 7, 1972), known professionally as DJ Nelson, is a Puerto Rican DJ and producer who played a significant role in the development and popularization of reggaeton. He first made a name for himself as part of the Noise, a club-centered collective that was spawned in 1994. The Noise—composed of DJs, MCs, producers, and club coordinators—hosted a long-lasting series of club nights in San Juan that were vital to the development and popularization of reggaeton. DJ Nelson earned credit as one of the top Noise DJs, and he also served as a producer and arranger for the collective's music.

== Career ==
In 1997, DJ Nelson made his CD debut, The Flow, with the song "Vengo Acabando", which was split into respective reggae and rap mixes, and he also was credited on a couple other CD releases that year: Don Chezina's Bien Guillao de Gangster and Ivy Queen's En Mi Imperio (1997). From this point forward, DJ Nelson began focusing on his solo career, primarily as a producer, with notable credits including Ivy Queen's The Original Rude Girl (1998) and Wisin & Yandel's Los Reyes del Nuevo Milenio (2000). His mixtape-style productions continued as well, with Undertrack Collection (2000) and Music (2001), the latter of which marked the advent of his personal brand, Flow Music. He released his first The Flow “Sweet Dreams album(2000)with hits “En la Disco” sang by Baby Rasta y Gringo and "Nelson tu eres un loco" which defined a new The Flow reggaeton era.

DJ Nelson signed to this label a trio of young, up-and-coming producers: Francisco Saldaña, Víctor Cabrera, Norgie Noriega, the former two of whom are better known as Luny Tunes, while the latter goes by just Noriega. These three producers pooled their talents together for Mas Flow (2003), a mixtape album that was groundbreaking in terms of popularity and influence. Numerous volumes followed, except without Noriega, who went the solo route, debuting with Contra la Corriente (2004). DJ Nelson continued with his own career as well, releasing Flow la Discoteka (2004) and opening a club of the same name, at which he was the resident DJ. In addition, he is credited with having set up The Mix 107.7, a popular Puerto Rican radio station hosted by DJ Coyote, and he even took his brand into the clothing industry, forming Flow Wear. Released in 2007, Flow la Discoteka, Vol. 2 featured his biggest hit single to date, "Pasarela", performed by Dalmata. DJ Nelson, Gerardo Cruet and Arcangel, consider themselves as pioneers in the new "urban movement", a subgenre of reggaeton and hip-hop, as Arcangel baptized it, is a blend of hip-hop, reggaeton, dance-hall, electronica, and other futuristic sounds. "Chica Virtual", "Pa' Que la Pases Bien", "Te Estoy Buscando". "Sexy Movimiento", "Siguelo", "Dame un Poquito" by Wisin & Yandel. "Veo Veo" by Yaga & Mackie Ranks. Also "Let's Do It" "No te Veo" . Some songs lean more towards dance hip hop while some lean more towards reggaeton depending on the song.

DJ Nelson claims to have invented the word "reggaeton" in 1995. Daddy Yankee has disputed this by claiming that he and DJ Playero used the word on the albums Playero 34 and Player 35 in 1994.

== Discography ==
Studio albums

- 1995: Big Bam Blunt
- 1996: Reggaeton Live (Vol. 1)
- 1997: Nel-Zone: The Real Thing
- 1997: The Flow
- 2000: The Flow: Sweet Dreams
- 2004: Flow La Discoteka
- 2007: Flow La Discoteka 2
- 2020: Inmortal

== Production discography ==
- 1997 En Mi Imperio - Ivy Queen
- 1997 Bien Guillao de Gangster-Don Chezina
- 1999 The Original Rude Girl - Ivy Queen
- 2000 Romances Del Ruido - Baby Rasta & Gringo
- 2007 Broke & Famous - Ñejo & Dalmata
- 2009 Broke & Famous: Still Broke The Mixtape - Ñejo & Dalmata
- 2009 El Dueño Del Sistema - J Alvarez
- 2010 El Movimiento Mixtape - J. Alvarez
- 2011 Otro Nivel De Musica - J. Alvarez
- 2021 Sound System: The Final Releases - Bad Gyal

== Various artists albums: Presented by DJ Nelson ==
- 2003 Mas Flow (Luny Tunes & Noriega)
- 2004 La Trayectoria (Luny Tunes)
- 2004 Contra la Corriente (Noriega)
- 2003 Los Abusadores (DJ Sonic)
