= Ñejo & Dálmata =

Puerto Rico reggaeton duo

- Also known as: Ñejo y El Damation; Dálmata & Ñejo
- Origin: Ponce, Puerto Rico
- Genres: Reggaeton; urban
- Years active: 2000–2013; 2018–present (on hiatus)
- Labels: Flow; Universal; Machete; El Bunker Productions
- Members: Carlos Crespo Planas (Ñejo); Fernando Mangual (Dálmata)

Ñejo & Dálmata, (also known as Ñejo y Dálmata) are a reggaeton duo from Ponce, Puerto Rico. Ñejo was born June 20, 1975 & Dálmata was born February 27, 1979. They had worked together in collaborations with other reggaeton artists before they released their duo album Broke & Famous in 2007 which peaked at 8 on the 'Billboard Latin Rhythms Albums Chart" and at 9 on the "Top Heatseekers (South Atlantic) Chart", as well as a number of their singles also charting on Billboard.

Ñejo has been involved with reggaeton since the production of DJ Joe 5 was released. They started working as a duo on Fatal Fantasy 2. In March 2012, Ñejo & Dálmata who had been signed to "Flow Music", moved to EL Bunker Productions.

In 2006, Dalmata on Naldos appeared separately on Sangre Nueva Special Edition. He also appeared in La Kalle, with the song Hot, and began work on a solo album.

In 2012, Ñejo & Dálmata released an EP.

== Discography ==
=== Studio albums ===
- Broke & Famous (2007)

=== EP ===
- Special Edition (2012)

=== As duo singles (including collaborations) ===
- "Me Dijeron Que Estas Suelta" (2003)
- "Como Te Extraño" (Feat. DJ Blass) (2004)
- "Tu Y Yo" (Feat. Maicol y Manuel) (2005)
- "Como Te Extraño" (Feat. Maicol y Manuel) (2005)
- "Esa Nena" (2005)
- "Voy A Pillarte" (2006)
- "Nos Matamos" (Remix) (Feat. Arcángel, Chyno Nyno, Jowell) (2006)
- "Malditas Putas" (Feat. Las Guanábanas) (2007)
- "El Abrazo Del Oso" (Remix) (Feat. Baby Rasta) (2007)
- "Pa' Mi Ponce (Intro Casa de Leones)" (Feat. Guelo Star, J King y Maximan, Jowell y Randy, Arcángel, Julio Voltio, La India) (2007)
- "Hoy Me Atrevo" (2007)
- "Algo Musical" (Feat. Arcángel) (2007)
- "Triste Y Sola" (2007)
- "Mundo Artificial" (Feat. L.T. "El Unico") (2007)
- "Intro (Los Capo)" (Feat. Voltio, Jowell y Randy, Guelo Star, Zion, De La Ghetto, Syko, Hector "El Father") (2007)
- "Olvídate De Eso" (Feat. Alexis & Fido) (2007)
- "Peligrosa" (2007)
- "El Mellao'" (Remix) (Feat. Voltio) (2007)
- "En Navidad" (2007)
- "Te Quiero Mas Que Mi Vida" (Feat. Cosculluela) (2008)
- "Algo Musical" (Remix) (Feat. Arcángel, Daddy Yankee) (2008)
- "No Puedo Estar Sin Ti" (2008)
- "Amiga" (2008)
- "La Película" (Feat. Vakero) (2008) (Talento Dominicano)
- "Dimelo Pa' Donde" (Feat. J King y Maximan, Guelo Star) (2008)
- "Un Hijo En La Disco" (Remix) (Feat. J King y Maximan, Guelo Star) (2008)
- "Hoy Me Rindo A Tus Pies (Remix)" (Feat. Franco y Oscarcito) (2008) (Talento Venezolano)
- "Tú Te Las Traes" (Remix) (Feat. Yomo, Jowell y Randy, Voltio) (2008)
- "La Ando Buscando" (2008)
- "Puti Puerca" (Remix) (Feat. Jamsha, Guelo Star, Chyno Nyno, De La Ghetto) (2008)
- "Loca Con Su Tigere" (Feat. El Cata, Voltio) (2008) (Talento Dominicano)
- "Flow" (Remix) (Feat. Plan B, Cheka) (2009)
- "Me Gusta" (Feat. Jutha y Small) (2009) (Talento Colombiano)
- "La Stripper" (Feat. Joan y O'Neil) (2009)
- "Cojelo Ahora" (Feat. Sie7e) (2009) (Talento Colombiano)
- "Santa Kachucha" (Remix) (Feat. Voltio, Kristian Bob, Chyno Nyno) (2009)
- "Estoy Esperando" (2009)
- "Ella Quiere" (Remix) (Feat. Lui-G) (2009)
- "Del Sur" (Feat. Guelo Star, Divino, Gastam, J King y Maximan) (2009)
- "Mujeres Talentosas" (Feat. Lui-G, Nengo Flow, Chyno Nyno, J Álvarez, Franco "El Gorilla") (2009)
- "2 Cacha" (Remix) (Feat. J Álvarez, Nengo Flow, Chyno Nyno, Lui-G, Guelo Star) (2009)
- "Estoy Esperando" (Remix) (Feat. Alexis & Fido) (2009)
- "Fuga (Remix)" (Feat. Trébol Clan, Farruko, Tony Lenta, Voltio, J Álvarez) (2009)
- "A Lo Escondio" (Feat. Lui-G, Yaga y Mackie, J Álvarez, George Las Guanabanas) (2009)
- "Si Te Atreves" (Feat. J Balvin) (2009)
- "Deje Mi Celular" (Feat. Jowell y Randy) (2009)
- "Deja" (Feat. J Álvarez, Jory) (2009)
- "Sexo Na´Ma" (Remix) (George Las Guanabanas Feat. Nejo y Dalmata, J Álvarez, Lui-G) (2009)
- "Rastrillea II" (J King y Maximan Feat. De La Ghetto, Baby Rasta & Gringo, Chyno Nyno, Nejo y Dalmata, Voltio, Guelo Star, Arcángel, Ivy Queen, Franco "El Gorilla", Alexis & Fido, Plan B, Nengo Flow, Zion y Lennox, Syko, Tony Lenta, Yaga y Mackie, Guayo y O.G. Black, Trébol Clan, Momola, Gastam, Nova y Jory) (Remix) (2009)
- "Si Tu No Estas" (Feat. The Melody Advance, Alexis) (2010)
- "No Necesito" (2010)
- "No Necesito" (Remix) (Feat Cosculluela) (2010)
- "Mari Mari" (Cheka Feat. Nejo y Dalmata) (2010)
- "Senda Maniática" (Feat. Tony Dize) (2010)
- "Entre El Humo Y El Alcohol" (2010)
- "Automovil" (2011)
- "Eso En 4 No Se Ve" (Feat. Lui-G, J Álvarez) (2010)
- "Sexo, Sudor, & Calor" (Feat. J Álvarez) (2011)
- "Tu Quieres" (Remix) (Amaro Feat. Nejo y Dalmata) (2011)
- "Sexo, Sudor, & Calor" (Remix) (Feat. J Álvarez, Zion y Lennox) (2011)
- "Automovil" (Remix) (Feat. Plan B) (2011)
- "Si Tu No Estas" (Remix) (Cosculluela Feat. Nejo y Dalmata, Farruko, J Balvin) (2011)
- "Si Yo Me Muero Mañana" (2011)
- "Me Le Pegue" (Remix) (Riko Feat. Nejo y Dalmata) (2012)
- "Todo Mundo En Su Nota" (2012)
- "Dime Haber" (Feat. Yaga y Mackie) (2013)
- "Musica, Sexo & Dinero" (Feat. Arcángel) (2013)
- "Señal De Vida" (Road To Riches) (2013)
- "Dime Que tu Quieres" Feat.Jowell y Randy (2018)

== Ñejo singles/collaborations ==
- "Esa Gata" (2002)
- "El Caballo" (Feat. Plan B) (2002)
- "La Mole" (2003)
- "Así Es la Vida" (2004)
- "Volando Bajito" (2004)
- "No Quiere Novio" (2006)
- "No Quiere Novio" (Remix) (Feat. Tego Calderón) (2006)
- "Tu Me Arrebata" (2006)
- "Voy Hacertelo" (Remix) (Feat. Naldo, De La Ghetto, Jowell y Randy) (2007)
- "Sube" (2007)
- "Mal De Amores" (2007)
- "¿Cómo Estás?" (2007)
- "¿Cómo Estás?" (Remix) (Feat. Huey Dunbar) (2007)
- "Lo Hecho Hecho Está" (Feat. Tego Calderón, Chyno Nyno, Pirulo, Voltio) (2007)
- "Un Call" (2007)
- "Yo Quisiera" (2007)
- "Por Allá Por Dónde Vivo" (2007)
- "No Es Lo Mismo" (Feat. Tego Calderón, Voltio) (2007)
- "Como Los Quiero" (2007)
- "Violento" (2007)
- "Cream 2008" (Lo Hecho Hecho Está (Remix)) (Feat. Tego Calderón, Chyno Nyno, Pirulo, Voltio) (2008)
- "Esta Noche" (Feat. Andy Boy, Chyno Nyno) (2008)
- "La Combi" (Feat. Nicky Jam) (2008)
- "Somos De Calle" (Remix) (Feat. Daddy Yankee, Arcángel, De La Ghetto, Guelo Star, MC Ceja, Voltio, Chyno Nyno, Cosculluela, Baby Rasta) (2008)
- "Un Party" (Remix) (Feat. Plan B, Arcángel) (2008)
- "Cuando La Calle Habla" (Feat. Arcángel, Guelo Star, Gastam, J Álvarez, Baby Rasta & Gringo, O.G.Black y Guayo "El Bandido", MC Ceja, Franco "El Gorilla", Nengo Flow, Delirious) (2008)
- "Corazón Roto" (2008)
- "Ando En La FJ" (2008)
- "Marihuana" (2008)
- "Los 3 Chiflones" (Feat. L.T. "El Unico", Chyno Nyno) (2008)
- "Aguinaldo" (2008)
- "Por Allá Por Dónde Vivo" (Feat. Hebert Vargas) (2009) (Talento Colombiano)
- "Papa Dios" (Remix) (Feat. Jowell y Randy, El Sujeto oro 24) (2009) (Talento Dominicano)
- "2 Cachas" (Feat. J Álvarez) (2009)
- "Tírate El Paso" (Feat. Nely "El Arma Secreta") (2009)
- "Sin Coro" (Feat. Chyno Nyno, Nengo Flow) (2009)
- "Mueve Ese Culo Puñeta" (Feat. Lui-G, Nengo Flow, Chyno Nyno) (2009)
- "Roze" (Feat. Jack Style) (2009)
- "Te Estoy Esperando" (Remix) (Feat. Alexis & Fido) (2009)
- "Si No Fumo" (Feat. Cosculluela) (2009)
- "Alegre Prendo" (2009)
- "Mi Blonsito Mañanero (Aguinaldo)" (2009)
- "Que Paso" (2010)
- "Cancion De Amor" (Feat. Dj Wassie) (2010)
- "Golpe De Estado" (Feat. Cosculluela, Divino, Arcángel, Dyland y Lenny, Yomo, John Jay, Franco "El Gorila") (2010)
- "Pegaito A La Pared" (Remix) (Feat. Tego Calderón, Plan B, Franco "El Gorila", Adrian Banton, Jowell) (2010)
- "Caminando En Fuego" (Remix) (Feat. Baby Rasta & Gringo, Kendo Kaponi, Jomar, Arcángel) (2010)
- "No Se Buscan Na" (Feat. Maestro, Mistel Fu) (2011)
- "Mi Estilo De Vida" (Feat. Kenai) (2011)
- "Esa Pelicula" (2011)
- "Escapate Conmigo" (Remix) (Feat. Wolfine) (2011)
- "La Cadilac" (2011)
- "Donde Esta Santa Claus" (2011)
- "Morir Perreando" (Remix) (Feat. Yaga y Mackie, J Álvarez) (2011)
- "Mucho Business" (Feat. Roka "El Tren", J Álvarez) (2011)
- "Diciembre 2" (Feat. Riko, Alberto Stylee) (2011)
- "Mi Estilo De Vida" (Remix) (Feat. Kenai, Voltio, Polakan, Cosculluela, Syko) (2011)
- "Esa Pelicula" (Remix) (Feat. Nengo Flow) (2011)
- "Vacilar Contigo" (2012)
- "Si la vez" (2012)
- "Dime Que Tu Piensas" (2013)
- "Coje La Orilla Charlatan" (Feat. Omar Garcia, Yetson, Gotay "El Autentiko") (2013)
- "Tal como eres" (Feat. J Álvarez, Divino, Reykon) (2013)
- "El Duende" (2013)
- "No Lo Pienses Mas" (2013)
- "No Lo Pienses Mas Remix" De La Ghetto, Arcángel (2013)
- "A Veces" (2014)
- "Mamisonga" (2015)
- "Esta Cabron" (2015) feat.Gotay
- "Se Te Hizo Tarde" feat. Jon Z, Ele A el Dominio & Jamby el Favo (2018)
- "Flow De Kilero" feat.Jamby, Ele A el Dominio & Lito Kirino (2018)
- "Me Pego Algo" feat. Jamsha (2018)
- "Chorro E' Loco" feat.Grupo Mania & Omega (2018)
- "Ya me fui" (2018) (Coming Soon)

== Dálmata singles/collaborations ==
- El Perro Te Azota (ft DJ Joe) (2000)
- "Hasta El Desmayo" (2002)
- "Lento Muévete" (Feat. Plan B, Blade Pacino) (2002)
- "Mueve Esa Cola" (2003)
- "Si Supieras Que No Hay Otra (ft VM)" (2004)
- "Caliente" (2005)
- "Nos Matamos" (2006)
- "Deja Quitarte La Ropa" (2006)
- "Just Like Sexo" (2007)
- "Pasarela" (2007)
- "Como Toda Una Señora" (2007)
- "Mírala" (2007)
- "Dímelo" (Remix) (Feat. Enrique Iglesias) (2007)
- "Pa Encima" (2007)
- "See You Mami" (2007)
- "Miéntame" (2007)
- "Mi Día De Suerte" (2007)
- "Pasarela" (Remix) (Feat. Los Rabanes) (2007)
- "Se Va, Se Va" (2007)
- "Sexo En La Playa" (2007)
- "Todo Tiene Su Final" (2007)
- "Contigo Una Noche" (2008)
- "Yo La Vi Bailando" (Feat. J Álvarez) (2008)
- "Que Raro" (Remix) (Feat. J Álvarez) (2008)
- "Para La Chica Que Le Gusta El Sexo" (Feat. Maicol) (2008)
- "Eso Que Tienes Tú" (Feat. Gustavo Laureano) (2008)
- "Salvaje" (2008)
- "Cual Es Tu Miedo" (2009)
- "Si Como Camina Cocina" (Feat. Naldo) (2009)
- "Solo Tu" (Feat. Los De La Noche) (2010)
- "Siguelo" (2010)
- "Dile A Tu Amiga" (2011)
- "Ni Loca" (Feat. Fanny Lú) (2011)
- "Alcoholica" (2012) (Feat. DJ RAC El De Los Sonidos Fantasticos)
- "Solitaria" (Feat. Alkilados) (2012)
- "Espina de Rosa" (Feat. Andy Rivera)(2013)
- "Deseo Animal"(2014)
- "Dulce carita" (Feat.Zion y Lennox)(2014)
- "La Cura" (Feat. Pasabordo) (2015)
- "Quiero Experimentar" (Remix)" (Feat. J Álvarez, Ozuna, Luigi 21+, Pusho, Darkiel) (2016)
- "Sutra" Sebastián Yatra (2017)
