= List of awards and nominations received by Wisin & Yandel =

Wisin & Yandel awards and nominations
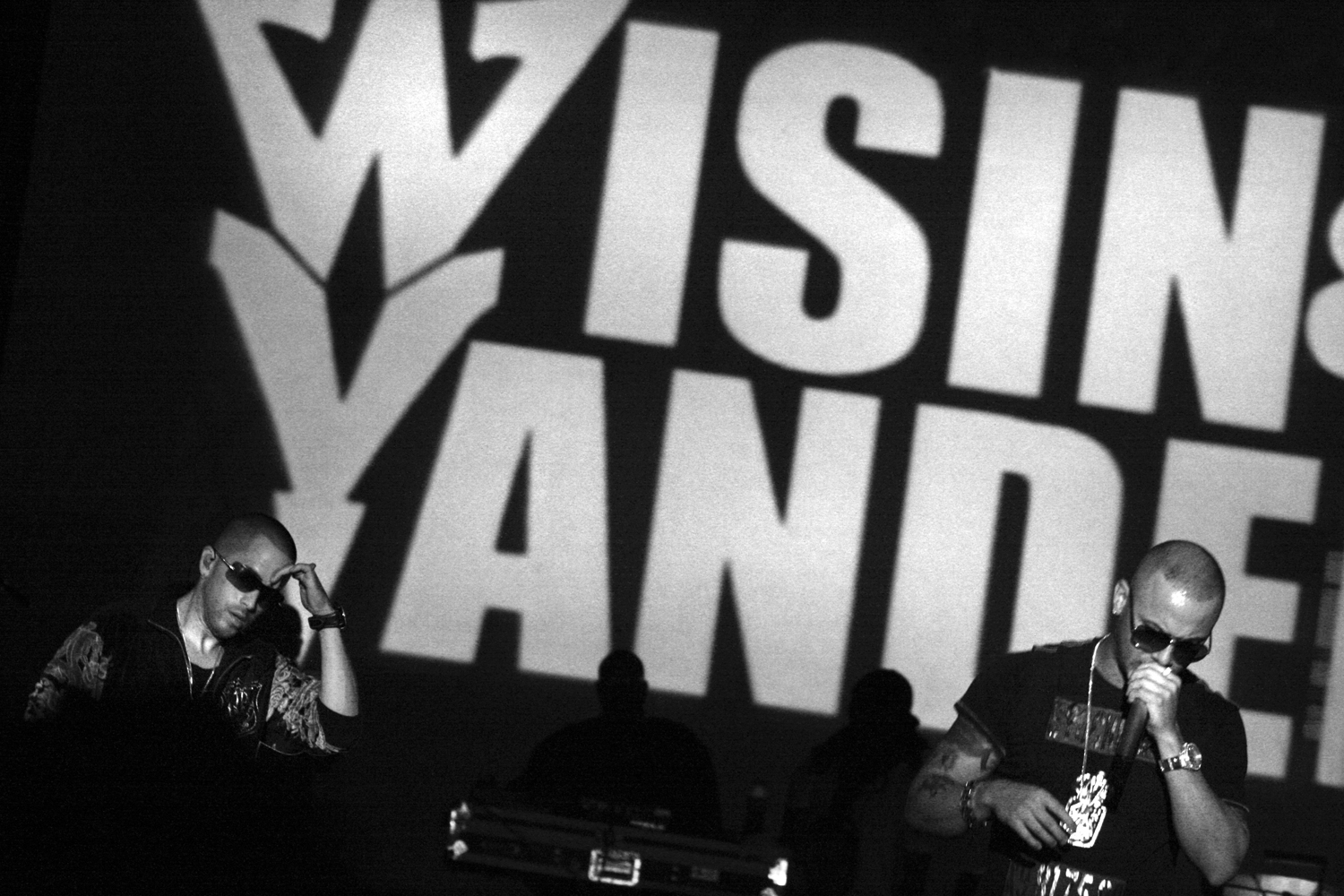
- Wisin & Yandel performing in 2008
Awards and nominations
Award	Wins	Nominations
Grammy	1	2
MTV VMA	1	4
Billboard Latin Music Awards	10	45
Latin Grammy Awards	2	8
Premios Juventud	12	32
Lo Nuestro Awards	15	39

Totals (Note: Certain award groups do not simply award one winner. They acknowledge several different recipients, have runners-up, and have third place. Since this is a specific recognition and is different from losing an award, runner-up mentions are considered wins in this award tally. For simplification and to avoid errors, each award in this list has been presumed to have had a prior nomination.)
- Wins: 47
- Nominations: 163

Wisin & Yandel is a Puerto Rican reggaeton duo from Cayey. They emerged in the music scene during the late 1990s and played an important role during reggaeton's rise into mainstream. The duo began an hiatus period in 2013 after fifteen years working together in order to follow their respective solo careers. During their active period, Wisin & Yandel explored different music genres, including reggaeton, hip hop, latin pop, electropop and contemporary R&B.

As to accolades as a duo, Wisin & Yandel received 47 awards from 163 nominations. Some highlighted accolades include a Grammy Award, 2 Latin Grammy Awards, 9 Billboard Latin Music Awards and 12 Lo Nuestro Awards.

== Awards and nominations ==
Award/organization	Year	Nominee/work	Category	Result	Ref.
American Society of Composers, Authors and Publishers Awards	2006	"Mayor Que Yo"	Latin Urban Song of the Year	Won	
Billboard Latin Music Awards	2006	Wisin & Yandel	Artist of the Year	Nominated	
Billboard Latin Music Awards	2006	Pa'l Mundo	Reggaeton Album of the Year	Nominated	
Billboard Latin Music Awards	2006	"Rakata"	Hot Latin Song of the Year	Nominated	
Billboard Latin Music Awards	2006	"Rakata"	Reggaeton Song of the Year	Nominated	
Billboard Latin Music Awards	2006	"Mayor Que Yo"	Hot Latin Song of the Year	Nominated	
Billboard Latin Music Awards	2006	"Mayor Que Yo"	Vocal Duet or Collaboration	Nominated	
Billboard Latin Music Awards	2006	"Mayor Que Yo"	Reggaeton Song of the Year	Won	
Billboard Latin Music Awards	2007	Wisin & Yandel	Artist of the Year	Won	
Billboard Latin Music Awards	2007	"Noche de Sexo"	Vocal Duet or Collaboration	Nominated	
Billboard Latin Music Awards	2007	"Pam Pam"	Song of the Year	Nominated	
Billboard Latin Music Awards	2007	"Rakata"	Latin Ringtone of the Year	Won	
Billboard Latin Music Awards	2008	Wisin & Yandel	Artist of the Year	Nominated	
Billboard Latin Music Awards	2008	Los Extraterrestres	Latin Album of the Year	Nominated	
Billboard Latin Music Awards	2008	Los Extraterrestres	Reggaeton Album of the Year	Won	
Billboard Latin Music Awards	2008	"Pegao"	Vocal Duet or Collaboration	Won	
Billboard Latin Music Awards	2009	Los Extraterrestres	Latin Rhythm Album of the Year – Duo or Group	Won	
Billboard Latin Music Awards	2009	"Ahora Es"	Tropical Airplay Song of the Year – Duo or Group	Nominated	
Billboard Latin Music Awards	2009	"Ahora Es"	Latin Rhythm Airplay Song of the Year – Duo or Group	Nominated	
Billboard Latin Music Awards	2009	"Síguelo"	Latin Rhythm Airplay Song of the Year – Duo or Group	Nominated	
Billboard Latin Music Awards	2010	Wisin & Yandel	Latin Artist of the Year	Nominated	
Billboard Latin Music Awards	2010	Wisin & Yandel	Top Latin Albums Artist of the Year – Duo or Group	Nominated	
Billboard Latin Music Awards	2010	Wisin & Yandel	Latin Pop Airplay Artist of the Year – Duo or Group	Nominated	
Billboard Latin Music Awards	2010	Wisin & Yandel	Tropical Airplay Artist of the Year – Duo or Group	Nominated	
Billboard Latin Music Awards	2010	La Revolución	Latin Album of the Year	Nominated	
Billboard Latin Music Awards	2010	"Gracias A Ti"	Hot Latin Song of the Year – Vocal Event	Nominated	
Billboard Latin Music Awards	2010	"Abusadora"	Tropical Airplay Song of the Year	Nominated	
Billboard Latin Music Awards	2010	"All Up 2 You"	Hot Latin Song of the Year – Vocal Event	Nominated	
Billboard Latin Music Awards	2011	Wisin & Yandel	Top Latin Albums Artist of the Year – Duo or Group	Nominated	
Billboard Latin Music Awards	2011	Wisin & Yandel	Latin Pop Airplay Artist of the Year – Duo or Group	Nominated	
Billboard Latin Music Awards	2011	Wisin & Yandel	Tropical Airplay Artist of the Year – Duo or Group	Nominated	
Billboard Latin Music Awards	2011	Wisin & Yandel	Latin Rhythm Airplay Artist of the Year – Duo or Group	Won	
Billboard Latin Music Awards	2011	Wisin & Yandel	Latin Rhythm Albums Artist of the Year – Duo or Group	Won	
Billboard Latin Music Awards	2012	Wisin & Yandel	Hot Latin Songs Artist of the Year – Duo or Group	Nominated	
Billboard Latin Music Awards	2012	Wisin & Yandel	Top Latin Albums Artist of the Year – Duo of Group	Nominated	
Billboard Latin Music Awards	2012	Wisin & Yandel	Latin Pop Airplay Artist of the Year – Duo or Group	Nominated	
Billboard Latin Music Awards	2013	Wisin & Yandel	Hot Latin Songs Artist of the Year – Duo or Group	Nominated	
Billboard Latin Music Awards	2013	Wisin & Yandel	Top Latin Albums Artist of the Year – Duo or Group	Nominated	
Billboard Latin Music Awards	2013	Wisin & Yandel	Latin Pop Airplay Artist of the Year – Duo or Group	Nominated	
Billboard Latin Music Awards	2013	Líderes	Digital Album of the Year	Nominated	
Billboard Latin Music Awards	2013	"Algo Me Gusta De Ti"	Hot Latin Song of the Year – Vocal Event	Nominated	
Billboard Latin Music Awards	2014	Wisin & Yandel	Latin Pop Songs Artist of the Year – Duo or Group	Nominated	
Billboard Latin Music Awards	2014	Wisin & Yandel	Latin Rhythm Songs Artist of the Year – Duo or Group	Nominated	
Billboard Latin Music Awards	2014	Wisin & Yandel	Latin Rhythm Albums Artist of the Year – Duo or Group	Won	
Billboard Latin Music Awards	2014	Líderes	Latin Rhythm Album of the Year	Won	
Billboard Latin Music Awards	2016	Wisin & Yandel	Latin Rhythm Albums Artist of the Year – Duo or Group	Nominated	
Billboard Latin Music Awards	2019	Wisin & Yandel	Latin Rhythm Artist of the Year – Duo or Group	Nominated	
Billboard Latin Music Awards	2020	Wisin & Yandel	Duo/Group Hot Latin Songs Artist of the Year	Nominated	
Billboard Latin Music Awards	2020	Wisin & Yandel	Latin Rhythm Duo/Group of the Year	Won	
Billboard Latin Music Awards	2020	"Aullando"	Tropical Song of the Year	Won	
Billboard Latin Music Awards	2021	Wisin & Yandel	Latin Rhythm Duo/Group of the Year	Nominated	
Billboard Latin Music Awards	2021	"Travesuras (Remix)"	Tropical Song of the Year	Nominated	
Billboard Latin Music Awards	2022	Wisin & Yandel	Latin Rhythm Artist of the Year, Duo or Group	Won	
Billboard Latin Music Awards	2023	Wisin & Yandel	Latin Rhythm Artist of the Year, Duo or Group	Won	
Billboard Latin Music Awards	2024	Wisin & Yandel	Latin Rhythm Artist of the Year, Duo or Group	Won	
Billboard Latin Music Awards	2026	Wisin & Yandel	Latin Rhythm Artist of the Year, Duo or Group	Won	
Broadcast Music, Inc. Awards	2007	Wisin & Yandel	Latin Songwriters of the Year	Won	
Broadcast Music, Inc. Awards	2012	Wisin & Yandel	Latin Songwriters of the Year	Won	
Grammy Awards	2009	Los Extraterrestres	Best Latin Urban Album	Won	
Grammy Awards	2010	La Revolución	Best Latin Rock, Urban or Alternative Album	Nominated	
International Dance Music Awards	2007	"Rakata"	Best Latin/Reggaeton Track	Nominated	
International Dance Music Awards	2008	"Sexy Movimiento"	Best Latin/Reggaeton Track	Nominated	
International Dance Music Awards	2010	"Abusadora"	Best Latin/Reggaeton Track	Nominated	
International Dance Music Awards	2012	"Tu Olor"	Best Latin/Reggaeton Track	Nominated	
International Dance Music Awards	2012	"Frío"	Best Latin/Reggaeton Track	Nominated	
Latin Grammy Awards	2006	Pa'l Mundo	Best Urban Music Album	Nominated	
Latin Grammy Awards	2008	Los Extraterrestres	Best Urban Music Album	Won	
Latin Grammy Awards	2009	La Revolución	Best Urban Music Album	Nominated	
Latin Grammy Awards	2009	"Abusadora"	Best Urban Song	Won	
Latin Grammy Awards	2009	"Mujeres In The Club"	Best Urban Song	Nominated	
Latin Grammy Awards	2011	Los Vaqueros: El Regreso	Best Urban Music Album	Nominated	
Latin Grammy Awards	2011	"Estoy Enamorado"	Best Urban Song	Nominated	
Latin Grammy Awards	2013	Líderes	Best Urban Music Album	Nominated	
Lo Nuestro Awards	2006	Wisin & Yandel	Urban Artist of the Year	Nominated	
Lo Nuestro Awards	2006	"Rakata"	Urban Song of the Year	Nominated	
Lo Nuestro Awards	2006	"Mayor Que Yo" (with Baby Ranks, Tony Tun Tun, Daddy Yankee and Héctor el Father)	Urban Song of the Year	Nominated	
Lo Nuestro Awards	2007	Wisin & Yandel	Urban Artist of the Year	Won	
Lo Nuestro Awards	2007	Pa'l Mundo: Deluxe Edition	Urban Album of the Year	Nominated	
Lo Nuestro Awards	2007	"Llamé Pa' Verte"	Urban Song of the Year	Won	
Lo Nuestro Awards	2008	Wisin & Yandel	Urban Artist of the Year	Won	
Lo Nuestro Awards	2008	Los Vaqueros	Urban Album of the Year	Nominated	
Lo Nuestro Awards	2008	"Pegao"	Urban Song of the Year	Won	
Lo Nuestro Awards	2009	Wisin & Yandel	Urban Artist of the Year	Won	
Lo Nuestro Awards	2009	Los Extraterrestres	Urban Album of the Year	Won	
Lo Nuestro Awards	2009	"Ahora Es"	Urban Song of the Year	Nominated	
Lo Nuestro Awards	2009	"Sexy Movimiento"	Urban Song of the Year	Nominated	
Lo Nuestro Awards	2010	Wisin & Yandel	Urban Artist of the Year	Won	
Lo Nuestro Awards	2010	Wisin & Yandel Presentan: La Mente Maestra	Urban Album of the Year	Won	
Lo Nuestro Awards	2010	"Me Estás Tentando"	Urban Song of the Year	Nominated	
Lo Nuestro Awards	2010	"All Up 2 You" (with Aventura and Akon)	Collaboration of the Year	Nominated	
Lo Nuestro Awards	2010	"All Up 2 You" (with Aventura and Akon)	Urban Song of the Year	Nominated	
Lo Nuestro Awards	2011	Wisin & Yandel	Artist of the Year	Won	
Lo Nuestro Awards	2011	Wisin & Yandel	Urban Artist of the Year	Nominated	
Lo Nuestro Awards	2011	La Revolución: Evolución	Urban Album of the Year	Won	
Lo Nuestro Awards	2011	"Te Siento"	Urban Song of the Year	Won	
Lo Nuestro Awards	2011	"Gracias A Ti"	Collaboration of the Year	Nominated	
Lo Nuestro Awards	2012	Wisin & Yandel	Urban Artist of the Year	Nominated	
Lo Nuestro Awards	2012	Los Vaqueros: El Regreso	Urban Album of the Year	Nominated	
Lo Nuestro Awards	2012	"Zun Zun Rompiendo Caderas"	Urban Song of the Year	Nominated	
Lo Nuestro Awards	2012	"Tu Olor"	Video of the Year	Won	
Lo Nuestro Awards	2013	Wisin & Yandel	Urban Artist of the Year	Won	
Lo Nuestro Awards	2013	Líderes	Urban Album of the Year	Won	
Lo Nuestro Awards	2013	"Follow the Leader" (with Jennifer Lopez)	Video of the Year	Nominated	
Lo Nuestro Awards	2014	Wisin & Yandel	Urban Artist of the Year	Nominated	
Lo Nuestro Awards	2014	"Algo Me Gusta De Ti" (with Chris Brown and T-Pain)	Urban Song of the Year	Nominated	
Lo Nuestro Awards	2014	"Algo Me Gusta De Ti" (with Chris Brown and T-Pain)	Collaboration of the Year	Nominated	
Lo Nuestro Awards	2018	Wisin & Yandel	Special Award	Won	
Lo Nuestro Awards	2019	"Fiebre" (with Ricky Martin)	Pop/Rock Song of the Year	Nominated	
Lo Nuestro Awards	2019	"Fiebre" (with Ricky Martin)	Pop/Rock Collaboration of the Year	Nominated	
Lo Nuestro Awards	2020	Como Antes Tour	Tour of the Year	Nominated	
Lo Nuestro Awards	2022	"Travesuras Remix" (with Nio Garcia, Casper Magico, Ozuna & Myke Towers)	Remix of the Year	Nominated	
Lo Nuestro Awards	2023	La Última Misión World Tour	Tour of the Year	Nominated	
Lo Nuestro Awards	2023	La Última Misión	Urban Album of the Year	Nominated	
Lo Nuestro Awards	2023	"Mayor Que Usted" (with Natti Natasha and Daddy Yankee)	Urban Collaboration of the Year	Nominated	
Lo Nuestro Awards	2024	"Besos Moja2" (with Rosalía)	Urban Song of the Year	Nominated	
MTV Video Music Awards	2009	"Abusadora"	Best Pop Video	Nominated	
MTV Video Music Awards	2010	Wisin & Yandel	Best Latino Artist	Nominated	
MTV Video Music Awards	2011	Wisin & Yandel	Best Latino Artist	Won	
MTV Video Music Awards	2012	Wisin & Yandel	Best Latino Artist	Nominated	
Premios MTV Latinoamérica	2007	Wisin & Yandel	MTV Tr3́s Viewer's Choice Award – Best Urban Artist	Nominated	
Premios MTV Latinoamérica	2009	Wisin & Yandel	Artist of the Year	Won	
Premios MTV Latinoamérica	2009	Wisin & Yandel	Best Group or Duet	Nominated	
Premios MTV Latinoamérica	2009	Wisin & Yandel	Best Urban Artist	Nominated	
Premios MTV Latinoamérica	2009	Wisin & Yandel	Best MTV Tr3́s Artist	Nominated	
Premios MTV Latinoamérica	2009	"Abusadora"	Video of the Year	Won	
Premios MTV Latinoamérica	2009	"Abusadora"	Song of the Year	Nominated	
Premios MTV Latinoamérica	2009	"Abusadora"	Best Ringtone	Nominated	
Premios MTV Latinoamérica	2009	"Mujeres In The Club"	Best Live Performance	Nominated	
Premios Juventud	2006	Wisin & Yandel	Favorite Urban Artist	Nominated	
Premios Juventud	2006	"Mayor Que Yo" (with Baby Ranks, Tony Tun Tun, Daddy Yankee and Héctor el Father)	Perfect Combination	Won	
Premios Juventud	2007	Wisin & Yandel	Voice of the Moment	Nominated	
Premios Juventud	2007	Wisin & Yandel	Favorite Urban Artist	Nominated	
Premios Juventud	2007	Wisin & Yandel	Favorite Concert	Nominated	
Premios Juventud	2007	Los Vaqueros	CD To Die For	Nominated	
Premios Juventud	2007	"Pegao"	Catchiest Tune	Won	
Premios Juventud	2007	"Noche de Entierro" (with Tony Tun Tun, Héctor el Father, Daddy Yankee and Zion)	Perfect Combination	Won	
Premios Juventud	2007	"Noche de Entierro" (with Tony Tun Tun, Héctor el Father, Daddy Yankee and Zion)	Favorite Video	Won	
Premios Juventud	2007	"Torre de Babel" (with David Bisbal)	Perfect Combination	Nominated	
Premios Juventud	2008	Wisin & Yandel	Voice of the Moment	Nominated	
Premios Juventud	2008	Wisin & Yandel	Favorite Urban Artist	Won	
Premios Juventud	2008	Los Extraterrestres	CD To Die For	Won	
Premios Juventud	2008	"Oye, ¿Dónde Está El Amor?" (with Franco De Vita)	Perfect Combination	Nominated	
Premios Juventud	2008	"Sexy Movimiento" (Remix) (with Nelly Furtado)	Perfect Combination	Nominated	
Premios Juventud	2008	"Sexy Movimiento"	Favorite Video	Nominated	
Premios Juventud	2008	"Yo Te Quiero"	Favorite Ringtone	Won	
Premios Juventud	2009	Wisin & Yandel	Voice of the Moment	Nominated	
Premios Juventud	2009	"Me Estás Tentando"	Catchiest Tune	Nominated	
Premios Juventud	2009	"Me Estás Tentando"	Favorite Video	Nominated	
Premios Juventud	2009	"Me Estás Tentando"	Favorite Ringtone	Won	
Premios Juventud	2009	"Lloro Por Ti" (with Enrique Iglesias)	Perfect Combination	Nominated	
Premios Juventud	2010	Wisin & Yandel	Favorite Urban Artist	Won	
Premios Juventud	2010	La Revolución World Tour	Favorite Concert	Won	
Premios Juventud	2010	"All Up 2 You" (with Aventura and Akon)	Perfect Combination	Nominated	
Premios Juventud	2011	Wisin & Yandel	Voice of the Moment	Nominated	
Premios Juventud	2011	Los Vaqueros: El Regreso	CD To Die For	Won	
Premios Juventud	2012	Wisin & Yandel	Favorite Urban Artist	Nominated	
Premios Juventud	2012	Wisin & Yandel	Idol of Generations Award	Won	
Premios Juventud	2013	Wisin & Yandel	Favorite Urban Artist	Nominated	
Premios Juventud	2013	"Algo Me Gusta De Ti" (with Chris Brown and T-Pain)	Perfect Combination	Nominated	
Premios Juventud	2013	Líderes World Tour	Favorite Concert	Nominated	
Premios Juventud	2019	"Reggaetón en lo Oscuro"	Best Song: The Traffic Jam	Nominated	
Premios Juventud	2022	Wisin & Yandel	Favorite Group or Duo of the Year	Nominated	
Premios Juventud	2023	Wisin & Yandel	Favorite Group or Duo of the Year	Nominated	
Premios Juventud	2023	"Mayor Que Usted" (with Natti Natasha and Daddy Yankee)	The Hottest Choreography	Won	
Premios Juventud	2023	"Mayor Que Usted" (with Natti Natasha and Daddy Yankee)	Best Pop/Urban Collaboration	Nominated	
Premios Juventud	2023	"Besos Moja2" (with Rosalía)	Best Urban Mix	Nominated	
Premios Juventud	2023	La Última Misión	Best Urban Album – Male	Nominated	
Orgullosamente Latino Awards	2008	Wisin & Yandel	Latin Group of the Year	Nominated	
Orgullosamente Latino Awards	2008	"Ahora Es"	Latin Song of the Year	Nominated	
Orgullosamente Latino Awards	2008	"Ahora Es"	Latin Video of the Year	Nominated	
Orgullosamente Latino Awards	2009	Wisin & Yandel	Latin Group of the Year	Nominated	
Orgullosamente Latino Awards	2009	"Lloro Por Ti" (with Enrique Iglesias)	Latin Song of the Year	Nominated	
Orgullosamente Latino Awards	2009	"Lloro Por Ti" (with Enrique Iglesias)	Latin Video of the Year	Nominated	
Orgullosamente Latino Awards	2010	Wisin & Yandel	Latin Group of the Year	Nominated	
Orgullosamente Latino Awards	2010	La Revolución	Latin Album of the Year	Won	
Orgullosamente Latino Awards	2010	"Abusadora"	Latin Video of the Year	Nominated	
People's Choice Reggaeton and Urban Awards	2005	"Mayor Que Yo" (with Baby Ranks, Tony Tun Tun, Daddy Yankee and Héctor el Father)	Best Song of the Year	Won	
Premios Oye!	2009	Wisin & Yandel	Best Pop Group	Nominated	
Premios Oye!	2009	La Revolución	Album of the Year	Nominated	
Premios People en Español	2010	Wisin & Yandel	Best Urban Soloist of Group	Nominated	
Premios People en Español	2012	Wisin & Yandel	Best Duo or Group	Nominated	
Premios Tu Mundo	2012	"Follow the Leader" (with Jennifer Lopez)	Best Music Video	Won	
Premios Tu Mundo	2013	"Algo Me Gusta De Ti" (with Chris Brown and T-Pain)	Most Popular Song of the Year	Nominated	
Premios Tu Mundo	2013	"Algo Me Gusta De Ti" (with Chris Brown and T-Pain)	Best Music Video	Nominated	
Premios Tu Música Urbano	2019	Wisin & Yandel	Urban Artist Duo or Group of the Year	Nominated	
Premios Tu Música Urbano	2019	Los Campeones del Pueblo	Album of the Year	Nominated	
Premios Tu Música Urbano	2019	"Reggaeton en lo Oscuro"	Song of the Year Duo or Group	Won	
Premios Tu Música Urbano	2019	"Fiebre" (with Ricky Martin)	Song Pop-Urban of the Year	Nominated	
Premios Tu Música Urbano	2019	"Te Boté II (Remix)" (with Nio Garcia, Casper Magico, Jennifer Lopez & Cosculluela)	Remix of the Year	Nominated	
Premios Tu Música Urbano	2019	Como Antes Tour	Concert of the Year	Won	
Premios Tu Música Urbano	2020	Wisin & Yandel	Top Icon	Won	
Premios Tu Música Urbano	2020	Wisin & Yandel	Artist of the Year	Nominated	
Premios Tu Música Urbano	2020	Wisin & Yandel	Top Male Artist	Nominated	
Premios Tu Música Urbano	2020	Wisin & Yandel	Top Artist - Duo or Group	Nominated	
Premios Tu Música Urbano	2020	Wisin & Yandel	World Tour	Nominated	
Premios Tu Música Urbano	2020	"Chica Bombastic"	Top Song - Duo or Group	Nominated	
Premios Tu Música Urbano	2020	"Duele" (with Reik)	Top Song - Pop Urban	Nominated	
Premios Tu Música Urbano	2020	"Mi Error (Remix)" (with Eladio Carrion, Zion & Lennox & Lunay)	New Generation Remix of the Year	Nominated	
Premios Tu Música Urbano	2020	"Imaginaste (Remix)" (with Jhayco)	New Generation Remix of the Year	Nominated	
Premios Tu Música Urbano	2020	"Si Supieras" (with Daddy Yankee)	Collaboration of the Year	Nominated	
Premios Tu Música Urbano	2022	Wisin & Yandel	Top Artist - Duo or Group	Nominated	
Premios Tu Música Urbano	2022	"Recordar"	Song of the Year - Duo or Group	Nominated	
Premios Tu Música Urbano	2022	"Travesuras Remix" (with Nio Garcia, Casper Magico, Ozuna & Myke Towers)	Top Song - Tropical Urban	Nominated	
Premios Tu Música Urbano	2023	Wisin & Yandel	Top Artist - Duo or Group	Won	
Premios Tu Música Urbano	2023	La Última Misión	Album of the Year - Male	Nominated	
Premios Tu Música Urbano	2023	"Besos Moja2" (with Rosalía)	Song of the Year - Duo or Group	Won	
Premios Tu Música Urbano	2023	"Si Te Pillo" (with Jowell & Randy)	Song of the Year - Duo or Group	Nominated	
Premios Tu Música Urbano	2023	La Última Misión World Tour	Tour of the Year	Nominated	

== See also ==
- List of awards and nominations received by Yandel
- Wisin
- Yandel
