= Wisin & Yandel discography =

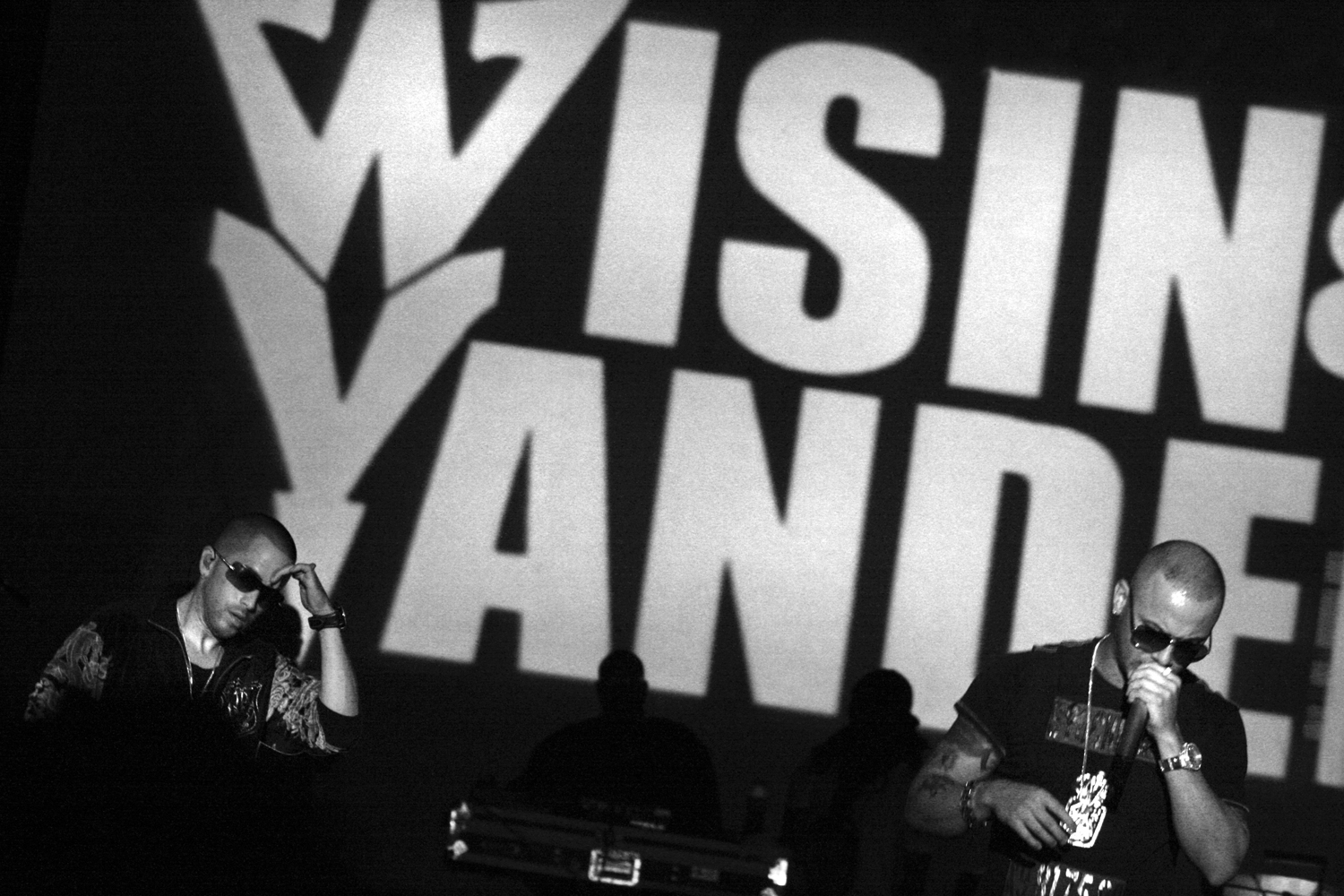
- Studio albums: 12
- Live albums: 3
- Compilation albums: 5
- Singles: 35
- Music videos: 48

Puerto Rican duo Wisin & Yandel has released ten studio albums, three live albums, four collaboration albums, four compilation albums, 35 singles and 48 music videos.

== Albums ==
=== Studio albums ===
Title	Album details	Peak chart positions				Sales	Certifications
Title	Album details	US	US Latin	US Rap	MEX	Sales	Certifications
Los Reyes del Nuevo Milenio	Released: March 7, 2000; Label: Disco Hit; Format: CD, compact cassette	—	35	—	—		
De Nuevos a Viejos	Released: November 13, 2001; Label: Lideres; Format: CD	—	26	—	—		
De Otra Manera	Released: November 19, 2002; Label: Lideres; Format: CD	—	—	—	20		
Mi Vida... My Life	Released: May 21, 2003; Label: Lideres Ent. Group; Format: CD	—	56	—	—		
Pa'l Mundo	Released: November 8, 2005; Label: Machete Music; Format: CD, digital download	30	1	15	—	World: 2,000,000; US: 676,000	RIAA: Gold; APFV: Gold
Los Vaqueros	Released: November 7, 2006; Label: Machete Music; Format: CD, digital download	44	2	—	69	US: 193,000; World: 500,000	RIAA: 2× Platinum (Latin)
Los Extraterrestres	Released: November 6, 2007; Label: Machete Music; Format: CD, digital download	14	1	26	27	World: 1,500,000; MEX: 40,000; US: 434,000	RIAA: 3× Platinum (Latin); AMPROFON: Gold; ASINCOL: Platinum; APFV: Platinum
La Mente Maestra	Released: November 11, 2008; Label: Machete Music; Format: CD, digital download	65	1	6	1		RIAA: Platinum (Latin); AMPROFON: Platinum
La Revolución	Released: May 26, 2009; Label: Machete Music; Format: CD, digital download	7	1	3	1	World: 3,000,000; US: 259,987	AMPROFON: Platinum; ASINCOL: Platinum
Los Vaqueros: El Regreso	Released: January 25, 2011; Label: Machete Music; Format: CD, digital download	8	1	2	1	MEX: 30,000; US: 130,000	AMPROFON: Gold
Líderes	Released: July 3, 2012; Label: Machete Music; Format: CD, digital download	42	1	6	2	US: 74,499	
Los Campeones del Pueblo "The Big Leagues"	Released: December 14, 2018; Label: Sony Music Latin; Format: CD, digital download	190	2	—	—		RIAA: 4× Platinum (Latin); AMPROFON: Platinum
La Última Misión	Released: September 30, 2022; Label: Sony Music Latin; Format: CD, digital download	—	14	9	—		RIAA: Gold (Latin)
"—" denotes a recording that did not chart or was not released in that territory.

=== Live albums ===
Title	Album details	Peak chart positions			
Title	Album details	US	US Latin	US Rap	MEX
Pa'l Mundo All Access Live	Released: March 13, 2007; Label: Machete Music; Format: CD, digital download	—	—	—	—
Tomando Control: Live	Released: September 25, 2007; Label: Machete Music; Format: CD, digital download	184	7	—	94
La Revolución: Live	Released: September 21, 2010; Label: Machete Music; Format: CD, digital download	—	5	16	25
En Vivo	Released: December 31, 2013; Label: Machete Music; Format: CD, digital download	—	—	—	—
"—" denotes a recording that did not chart or was not released in that territory.

=== Compilations ===
Title	Album details	Peak chart positions	
Title	Album details	US Latin	MEX
Mi Vida: La Película	Released: March 22, 2005; Label: Lideres; Format: CD, digital download	—	—
2010 Lost Edition	Released: May 22, 2007; Label: Machete Music; Format: CD, digital download	—	—
El Dúo de la Historia Vol. 1	Released: June 9, 2009; Label: Sony BMG; Format: CD, digital download	36	44
WY Records: Lo Mejor De La Compañía	Released: March 23, 2010; Label: Machete Music; Format: CD, digital download	—	—
La Historia del Dúo, Vol. 1	Released: November 5, 2013; Label: Machete Music; Format: CD, digital download	—	80
Como en los Tiempos de Antes	Released: November 16, 2018; Label: Fresh Productions; Format: digital download; DJ mix album	—	—
Juntos Otra Vez	Released: December 14, 2018; Label: Machete Music; Format: digital download	—	—
"—" denotes a recording that did not chart or was not released in that territory.

=== Remix albums ===
Title	Album details	Peak chart positions	
Title	Album details	US	US Latin
Los Vaqueros Wild Wild Mixes	Released: July 24, 2007; Label: Machete Music; Format: CD, digital download	104	4

== Singles ==
=== As lead artists ===
Title	Year	Peak chart positions										Certifications (sales thresholds)	Album
Title	Year	US	US Latin	US Latin Rhythm	US Latin Pop	US Latin Tropical	MEX	SPA	VEN	COL	FRA	Certifications (sales thresholds)	Album
"Rakata"	2005	85	2	2	—	2	—	—	—	10	—		Pa'l Mundo
"Mírala Bien"	2005	—	—	31	—	—	—	—	—	—	—		Pa'l Mundo
"Llamé Pa' Verte (Bailando Sexy)"	2005	100	1	1	—	1	—	—	—	31	—		Pa'l Mundo
"Noche de Sexo" (featuring Aventura)	2006	— (Note: "Noche de Sexo" did not enter the Billboard Hot 100, but peaked at number 11 on the Bubbling Under Hot 100 chart.)	4	2	—	10	—	—	—	15	—		Pa'l Mundo
"Pam Pam"	2006	— (Note: "Pam Pam" did not enter the Billboard Hot 100, but peaked at number four on the Bubbling Under Hot 100 chart.)	1	1	1	1	—	—	—	—	—		Pa'l Mundo
"Pegao"	2006	—	6	2	—	1	—	—	—	40	—		Los Vaqueros
"Yo Te Quiero"	2006	—	19	3	—	22	—	—	—	32	—		Los Vaqueros
"Sexy Movimiento"	2007	98	1	1	31	1	—	—	5	9	—		Los Extraterrestres
"Oye, ¿Dónde Está El Amor?" (featuring Franco De Vita)	2008	—	25	25	15	—	—	—	—	—	—		Los Extraterrestres
"Ahora Es"	2008	—	5	5	34	3	—	—	5	16	—		Los Extraterrestres
"Síguelo"	2008	—	8	8	—	15	—	—	—	18	—		Los Extraterrestres
"Me Estás Tentando"	2008	— (Note: "Me Estás Tentando" did not enter the Billboard Hot 100, but peaked at number 13 on the Bubbling Under Hot 100 chart.)	1	1	25	1	24	—	—	27	—		La Mente Maestra
"Mujeres in the Club" (featuring 50 Cent)	2009	—	—	—	—	—	—	—	—	—	—		La Revolución
"Abusadora"	2009	— (Note: "Abusadora" did not enter the Billboard Hot 100, but peaked at number 14 on the Bubbling Under Hot 100 chart.)	1	1	10	1	—	34	6	5	—		La Revolución
"Gracias a Tí" (featuring Enrique Iglesias)	2009	— (Note: "Gracias a Tí" did not enter the Billboard Hot 100, but peaked at number 16 on the Bubbling Under Hot 100 chart.)	1	1	3	1	17	—	12	1	—		La Revolución
"Te Siento"	2010	—	16	6	11	4	—	—	6	8	—		La Revolución: La Evolución
"Irresistible"	2010	—	29	18	20	33	—	—	—	—	—		Step Up 3D
"Estoy Enamorado"	2010	—	7	3	7	6	28	—	—	2	—		La Revolución: Live
"Zun Zun Rompiendo Caderas"	2010	—	12	5	8	8	—	—	—	34	—		Los Vaqueros: El Regreso
"Tu Olor"	2011	— (Note: "Tu Olor" did not enter the Billboard Hot 100, but peaked at number 25 on the Bubbling Under Hot 100 chart.)	1	1	12	1	—	—	—	36	—		Los Vaqueros: El Regreso
"Follow the Leader" (featuring Jennifer Lopez)	2012	— (Note: "Follow the Leader" did not enter the Billboard Hot 100, but peaked at number five on the Bubbling Under Hot 100 chart.)	1	1	3	2	19	26	—	7	177	RIAA: Gold	Líderes
"Algo Me Gusta De Ti" (featuring Chris Brown and T-Pain)	2012	— (Note: "Algo Me Gusta de Ti" did not enter the Billboard Hot 100, but peaked at number 10 on the Bubbling Under Hot 100 chart.)	1	1	1	2	—	—	—	4	—		Líderes
"Te Deseo"	2013	—	29	7	29	—	—	—	—	—	—		La Historia del Dúo, Vol. 1
"Reggaetón en lo Oscuro"	2018	—	18	1	2		—	59	16	54	—	RIAA: 6× Platinum (Latin)	Los Campeones del Pueblo: The Big Leagues
"Callao" (with Ozuna)	2018	—	44	—	—	—	—	93	—	—	—	RIAA: 3× Platinum (Latin)	Los Campeones del Pueblo: The Big Leagues
"La Luz" (with Maluma)	2018	—	—	—	—	—	—	—	—	—	—	RIAA: Platinum (Latin)	Los Campeones del Pueblo: The Big Leagues
"Aullando" (with Romeo Santos)	2019	— (Note: "Aullando" did not enter the Billboard Hot 100, but peaked at number seven on the Bubbling Under Hot 100 chart.)	10	1	7	1	7	24	8	5	—	RIAA: 22× Platinum (Latin); PROMUSICAE: Platinum	Los Campeones del Pueblo: The Big Leagues
"Duele" (with Reik)	2019	—	—	—	—	—	14	—	7	2	—	RIAA: Platinum (Latin)	Ahora
"Dame Algo" (with Bad Bunny)	2019	—	—	—	—	—	—	—	—	—	—	RIAA: 3× Platinum (Latin)	Los Campeones del Pueblo: The Big Leagues
"Guaya"	2019	—	—	—	—	—	—	—	—	—	—	RIAA: Platinum (Latin)	Los Campeones del Pueblo: The Big Leagues
"Si Supieras" (with Daddy Yankee)	2019	—	15	1	2	—	—	44	16	88	—	RIAA: 6× Platinum (Latin); PROMUSICAE: Gold	El Disco Duro
"Chica Bombastic"	2019	—	50	48	24	—	—	—	—	—	—	RIAA: 2× Platinum (Latin)	La Última Misión
"Imaginaste" (Jhay Cortez X Wisin & Yandel)	2019	—	45	—	—	—	—	—	—	—	—		Famouz Reloaded
"Ganas de Ti" (with Sech)	2020	—	49	26	11	—	—	—	—	—	—	RIAA: 2× Platinum (Latin)	La Última Misión
"Mala Costumbre" (with Manuel Turizo)	2021	—	20	11	—	—	3	22	—	3	—	PROMUSICAE: Gold	Dopamina
"Ya Pasó" (with Revol, Yandel, Cosculluela, Zion)	2021	—	—	—	—	—	—	—	—	—	—		TBA
"Recordar"	2021	—	—	37	—	—	—	—	—	—	—		La Última Misión
"No Se Olvida"	2022	—	—	—	—	—	—	—	—	—	—	RIAA: Gold (Latin)	La Última Misión
"Besos Moja2" (with Rosalía)	2022	—	35	—	—	—	—	6	—	—	—	RIAA: Gold (Latin); PROMUSICAE: 3× Platinum	La Última Misión
"Vapor" (with Rauw Alejandro)	2022	—	—	—	—	—	—	—	—	—	—	RIAA: Gold (Latin)	La Última Misión
"—" denotes a recording that did not chart or was not released in that territory.	2022												

=== As featured artists ===
Title	Year	Peak chart positions									Certifications (sales thresholds)	Album
Title	Year	US	US Latin	US Latin Rhythm	US Latin Pop	US Latin Tropical	MEX	GER	SPA	SWI	Certifications (sales thresholds)	Album
"Mayor Que Yo" (Luny Tunes featuring Baby Ranks, Tony Tun Tun, Wisin & Yandel, Héctor el Father, and Daddy Yankee)	2005	— (Note: "Mayor Que Yo" did not enter the Billboard Hot 100 chart but peaked on the Bubbling Under Hot 100 chart at number five.)	3	3	11	1	—	—	—	—		Mas Flow 2
"No Me Dejes Solo" (Daddy Yankee featuring Wisin & Yandel)	2005	—	32	8	—	8	—	—	—	—		Barrio Fino
"Take the Lead (Wanna Ride)" (Bone Thugs-n-Harmony and Wisin & Yandel featuring Fatman Scoop and Melissa Jiménez)	2006	—	44	44	—	—	—	—	—	—		Take the Lead Soundtrack
"Noche de Entierro (Nuestro Amor)" (Luny Tunes featuring Tony Tun Tun, Wisin & Yandel, Héctor el Father, Zion, and Daddy Yankee)	2006	— (Note: "Noche de Entierro" did not enter the Billboard Hot 100 chart but peaked on the Bubbling Under Hot 100 chart at number 23.)	6	6	27	4	—	—	—	—		Mas Flow: Los Benjamins
"El Teléfono" (Héctor el Father featuring Wisin & Yandel)	2006	—	11	11	—	16	—	—	—	—		Los Rompe Discotekas
"Burn It Up" (R. Kelly featuring Wisin & Yandel)	2006	—	30	—	—	8	—	30	—	25		TP.3 Reloaded
"Torre de Babel" (David Bisbal featuring Wisin & Yandel)	2007	—	10	—	13	2	—	—	1	—		Premonición
"No Sé de Ella" (Don Omar featuring Wisin & Yandel)	2007	—	20	—	—	—	—	—	—	—		Los Bandoleros Reloaded
"Lloro Por Ti" (Enrique Iglesias featuring Wisin & Yandel)	2008	91	1	—	1	—	—	—	—	—		Enrique Iglesias: 95/08 Éxitos
"All Up 2 You" (Aventura featuring Akon and Wisin & Yandel)	2009	108	4	1	14	2	9	—	—	—		The Last
"Prrrum" (Cosculluela featuring Wisin & Yandel)	2010	—	36	—	36	9	—	—	—	—		El Principe: Ghost Edition
"Loco" (Jowell & Randy featuring Wisin & Yandel)	2010	—	22	3	15	3	—	—	—	—		El Momento
"No Me Digas Que No" (Enrique Iglesias featuring Wisin & Yandel)	2010	121	1	1	1	2	14	—	—	—		Euphoria
"Frío" (Ricky Martin featuring Wisin & Yandel)	2011	—	6	—	7	5	—	—	—	—		Música + Alma + Sexo
"Fiebre" (Ricky Martin featuring Wisin & Yandel)	2018	—	17	1	3	—	6	—	24	69	PROMUSICAE: Gold; RIAA: Platinum (Latin)	TBA
"Quiero Más" (Ozuna featuring Wisin & Yandel)	2018	—	20	—	—	—	—	—	100	—		Aura
"Única (Remix)" (Ozuna featuring Anuel AA, Wisin & Yandel)	2018	72	3	1	—	—	—	—	57	—		Aura
"Te Boté II" (Casper Magico, Nio Garcia and Cosculluela featuring Wisin & Yandel and Jennifer Lopez)	2018	—	—	—	—	—	—	—	—	—	RIAA: Platinum (Latin)	Non-album single
"Mi Error Remix" (Eladio Carrión, Zion & Lennox, Wisin & Yandel, Lunay)	2019	—	—	—	—	—	—	—	—	—		Non-album single
"Moviéndolo (Remix)" (with Pitbull and El Alfa)	2020	—	—	—	—	—	—	—	—	—		Non-album single
"Travesuras (Remix)" (Nio García, Casper Mágico and Ozuna featuring Wisin & Yandel, Myke Towers and Flow La Movie)	2021	—	—	—	—	—	—	—	—	—	RIAA: Platinum (Latin)	Non-album single
"Mayor Que Usted" (Natti Natasha, Daddy Yankee, Wisin & Yandel)	2022	—	29	—	—	—	—	—	—	—	RIAA: Platinum (Latin)	Non-album single
"—" denotes a recording that did not chart or was not released in that territory.

=== Other charted, certified and promotional songs ===
Title	Year	Peak chart positions					Certifications (sales thresholds)	Album
Title	Year	US Latin	US Latin Rhythm	US Latin Pop	US Trop.	SPA	Certifications (sales thresholds)	Album
"Llora Mi Corazón" (featuring La Secta AllStar)	2005	38	38	15	—	—		Pa'l Mundo: Deluxe Edition
"Paleta" (featuring Daddy Yankee)	2006	31	31	—	39	—		Pa'l Mundo
"Sácala" (Héctor el Father, Naldo, Daddy Yankee, Don Omar, Wisin & Yandel, Tego Calderón, Voltio, Zion)	2006	36	36	—	1	—		Sangre Nueva
"Delirando"	2007	—	—	—	36	—		Echo Presenta: Invasión
"Nadie Como Tú" (featuring Don Omar)	2007	—	—	—	28	—		Los Vaqueros
"La Pared" (featuring Don Omar and Gadiel)	2007	—	—	—	32	—		Los Vaqueros Wild Wild Mixes
"Atrévete" (featuring Franco "El Gorila")	2007	8	8	—	5	—		Los Vaqueros Wild Wild Mixes
"Besos Mojados"	2010	—	—	—	31	—		La Revolución
"Máquina del Tiempo"	2011	4	4	6	3	—		El Patrón: Invencible
"Hipnotízame"	2012	48	—	—	—	—		Líderes
"Peligrosa" (J Balvin featuring Wisin & Yandel)	2018	33	—	—	—	50	PROMUSICAE: Gold	Vibras
"Ojalá" (with Farruko)	2018	—	—	—	—	—	RIAA: Platinum (Latin)	Los Campeones del Pueblo
"Deseo" (with Zion & Lennox)	2018	—	—	—	—	—	RIAA: Gold (Latin)	Los Campeones del Pueblo
"Mi Intención" (with Miky Woodz)	2018	—	—	—	—	—	RIAA: Gold (Latin)	Los Campeones del Pueblo
"Leyendas" (Karol G featuring Wisin & Yandel, Nicky Jam, Ivy Queen, Zion and Alberto Stylee)	2021	—	—	—	—	—	RIAA: Platinum (Latin)	KG0516
"Llueve" (with Sech and Jhay Cortez)	2022	—	—	—	—	92	RIAA: Gold (Latin)	La Última Misión
"—" denotes a recording that did not chart or was not released in that territory.

== Album appearances ==
The following songs are not singles and have not appeared on an album by Wisin & Yandel.

Year	Title	Album
2003	"Aventura" (Luny Tunes & Noriega featuring Wisin & Yandel)	Mas Flow 1
2004	"Esta Noche Hay Pelea" (Luny Tunes featuring Wisin & Yandel)	La Trayectoria
2004	"Desafío" (Luny Tunes featuring Tempo, Tego Calderón, Don Omar, Alexis and Wisin & Yandel)	La Trayectoria
2004	"Los Pistoleros" (Luny Tunes featuring Wisin & Yandel)	La Trayectoria
2004	"En La Disco Bailoteo" (Luny Tunes featuring Wisin & Yandel)	La Trayectoria
2004	"El Booty" (Luny Tunes featuring Wisin & Yandel)	La Mision 4: The Take Over
2004	"Caliéntame" (Luny Tunes featuring Wisin & Yandel)	La Mision 4: The Take Over
2004	"Say Ho: Beat" (Luny Tunes featuring Wisin & Yandel)	The Kings of the Beats
2004	"Absolut" (Luny Tunes Remix) (Lenny Kravitz featuring Wisin & Yandel)	-
2006	"Mayor Que Yo 2" (Luny Tunes featuring Wisin & Yandel)	Reggaeton Hits
2006	"Stars Are Blind" (Luny Tunes Remix) (Paris Hilton featuring Wisin & Yandel)	Stars Are Blind - EP
2006	"Entrégate" (Luny Tunes and Tainy featuring Wisin & Yandel)	Mas Flow: Los Benjamins
2008	"Descontrol" (Tony Dize featuring Wisin & Yandel)	La Melodía De La Calle
2009	"Pa' Lo Oscuro" (Franco "El Gorila" featuring Yaviah and Wisin & Yandel)	Welcome to the Jungle
2010	"Acércate" (Ivy Queen featuring Wisin & Yandel)	Drama Queen
2011	"Pass at Me" (Remix) (Timbaland featuring Wisin & Yandel)	-
2015	"En Lo Oscuro" (Don Omar featuring Wisin & Yandel)	The Last Don II
2019	"Moviéndolo" (Pitbull featuring Wisin & Yandel)	Libertad 548

== Notes ==
- While the U.S. Billboard Hot 100 chart comprises 100 songs, the Bubbling Under Hot 100 Singles acts as an extension to each chart. Thus, songs that have peaked up to these extension charts are listed in this discography under the Hot 100 with values over a hundred.

== Filmography ==
- 2003: Mi Vida
- 2011: Revolución
