= Wisin & Yandel videography =

Wisin & Yandel video discography
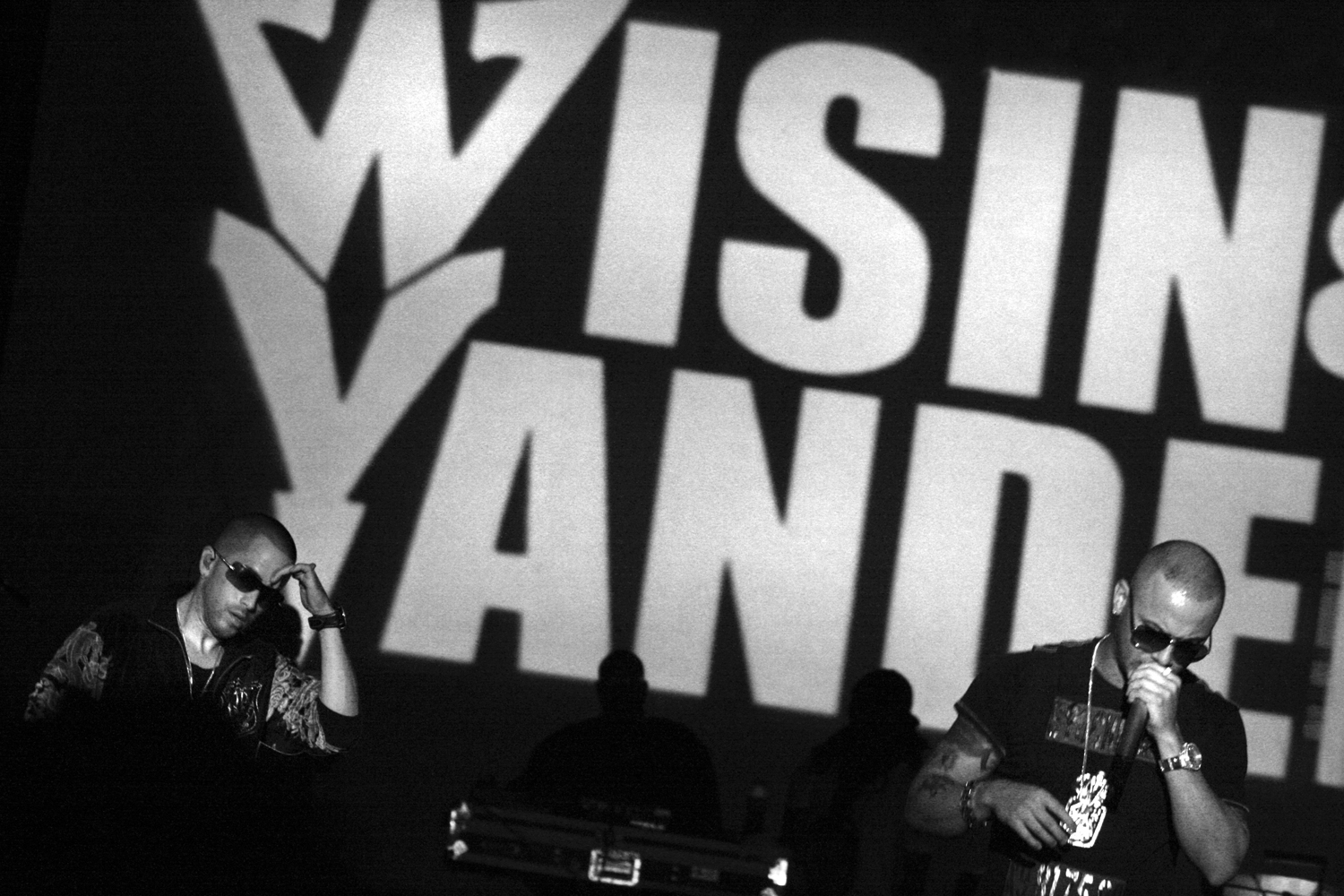
- Yandel (left) and Wisin (right) performing in 2008.
- Music videos: 48
- Featured music videos: 11

This page includes the videography of Reggaeton duo Wisin & Yandel. They have filmed around 59 videos during their career. They have worked with many successful directors, but most of their recent music videos have been directed by Dominican Republic film and music video director Jessy Terrero.

== Music videos ==
List of music videos, showing year released and directors
Year	Music video	Artist(s)	Director(s)	Ref.
As lead artists
1998	"No Fear 3"	DJ Dicky, Memo y Vale, Julio Voltio, Lito & Polaco and Wisin & Yandel	Alex Serrano / Ozzie Forbes	
1999	"Boricuas NY 1"	Nicky Jam, Héctor & Tito, Baby Rasta & Gringo and Wisin & Yandel	Unknown	
1999	"Las Mujeres de Moda"	Wisin & Yandel	Unknown	
1999	"Girlas"	Wisin & Yandel	Unknown	
2001	"En Busca De Ti"	Wisin & Yandel	Unknown	
2003	"Reggae Rockeao / Piden Perreo"	Wisin & Yandel featuring Alexis & Fido	Unknown	
2003	"En La Disco Bailoteo"	Wisin & Yandel	Unknown	
2003	"Aventura"	Wisin & Yandel	Unknown	
2003	"El Booty"	Wisin & Yandel	Unknown	
2003	"Las 9 Plagas" ("Ellos Moriran")	Baby Rasta & Gringo, Las Guanábanas, Héctor & Tito and Wisin & Yandel	Unknown	
2003	"La Misión III" ("Ya Veo")	Tego Calderón, Alexis, Eddie Dee and Wisin & Yandel	Unknown	
2004	"Hola"	Wisin & Yandel	Unknown	
2004	"Dem Bow / La Vaquera"	Wisin & Yandel	Unknown	
2004	"Guáyale El Mahón / Esta Noche Hay Pelea"	Wisin & Yandel	Unknown	
2004	"Eso Perra"	Wisin & Yandel	Unknown	
2005	"Rakata"	Wisin & Yandel	Marlon Peña	
2005	"Llamé Pa' Verte (Bailando Sexy)"	Wisin & Yandel	Leonardo González	
2006	"Mírala Bien"	Wisin & Yandel	Willie Berrios / David Impelluso	
2006	"Pam Pam"	Wisin & Yandel	David Impelluso	
2006	"Toma"	Wisin & Yandel featuring Franco "El Gorila"	David Impelluso	
2006	"Burn It Up"	Wisin & Yandel featuring R. Kelly	Bille Woodruff / R. Kelly	
2006	"Pegao"	Wisin & Yandel	Willie Berrios / Rafy Pérez	
2007	"Yo Te Quiero"	Wisin & Yandel	Jessy Terrero	
2007	"Sexy Movimiento"	Wisin & Yandel	Jessy Terrero	
2008	"Ahora Es"	Wisin & Yandel	Jessy Terrero	
2008	"Oye, ¿Dónde Está El Amor?"	Wisin & Yandel featuring Franco De Vita	Jessy Terrero	
2008	"Síguelo"	Wisin & Yandel	Jessy Terrero	
2008	"Dime Qué Te Pasó"	Wisin & Yandel	Jessy Terrero	
2008	"Me Estás Tentando" + Remix feat. DJ Nesty, Franco "El Gorila" and Jayko	Wisin & Yandel featuring DJ Nesty	Jessy Terrero	
2009	"Mujeres in the Club"	Wisin & Yandel featuring 50 Cent	Jessy Terrero	
2009	"Abusadora"	Wisin & Yandel	Jessy Terrero	
2009	"Gracias a Tí" + Remix feat. Enrique Iglesias	Wisin & Yandel	Jessy Terrero	
2009	"Imagínate"	Wisin & Yandel featuring T-Pain	Jessy Terrero	
2009	"Te Siento" + Remix feat. Franco "El Gorila"	Wisin & Yandel	Jessy Terrero	
2010	"Irresistible"	Wisin & Yandel	Jessy Terrero	
2010	"Estoy Enamorado"	Wisin & Yandel	Jessy Terrero	
2010	"La Reunión De Los Vaqueros"	Wisin & Yandel featuring Cosculluela, Tego Calderón, De La Ghetto and Franco "El Gorilla"	Jessy Terrero	
2010	"No Dejemos Que se Apague"	Wisin & Yandel featuring 50 Cent and T-Pain	Jessy Terrero	
2011	"Zun Zun Rompiendo Caderas" + Remix feat. Pitbull and Tego Calderón	Wisin & Yandel	Jessy Terrero	
2011	"Tu Olor"	Wisin & Yandel	Simón Brand	
2012	"Follow the Leader"	Wisin & Yandel featuring Jennifer Lopez	Jessy Terrero	
2012	"Algo Me Gusta de Ti" + "Something About You"	Wisin & Yandel featuring Chris Brown and T-Pain	Jessy Terrero	
2013	"Te Deseo"	Wisin & Yandel	Carlos Pérez	
As featured artists
Year	Music video	Artist(s)	Director(s)	Ref.
2001	"Por Qué No"	Tisuby & Georgina (feat. Wisin & Yandel)	Unknown	
2004	"No Me Dejes Solo"	Daddy Yankee (feat. Wisin & Yandel)	Unknown	
2005	"Mayor Que Yo"	Luny Tunes (feat. Baby Ranks, Daddy Yankee, Tonny Tun Tun, Héctor el Father and Wisin & Yandel)	Marlon Peña	
2006	"El Teléfono"	Héctor el Father (feat. Wisin & Yandel)	David Impelluso	
2006	"Noche de Entierro (Nuestro Amor)"	Luny Tunes (feat. Tainy, Daddy Yankee, Héctor el Father, Zion, Tony Tun-Tun and Wisin & Yandel)	Jessy Terrero	
2007	"Torre De Babel (Reggaeton Mix)"	David Bisbal (feat. Wisin & Yandel)	Mariano García	
2008	"Lloro Por Ti (Remix)"	Enrique Iglesias (feat. Wisin & Yandel)	Paul Minor	
2009	"All Up 2 You"	Aventura (feat. Akon and Wisin & Yandel)	Jessy Terrero	
2010	"Loco (Remix)"	Jowell & Randy (feat. Wisin & Yandel)	Ulysses Terrero	
2010	"No Me Digas Que No"	Enrique Iglesias (feat. Wisin & Yandel)	Jessy Terrero	
2011	"Frío (Remix)"	Ricky Martin (feat. Wisin & Yandel)	Carlos Pérez	

=== As solo artists ===
- Wisin videography
- Yandel videography

== See also ==
- Wisin & Yandel discography
