= La Evolución =

La Revolución: Evolution

Mixtape by Wisin & Yandel
- Released: November 23, 2009
- Recorded: September 8, 2008–March 29, 2009
- Venue: Barranquitas, Puerto Rico
- Studio: La Mente Maestra Studio
- Genres: Reggaeton, hip hop, R&B
- Length: N/A
- Labels: Universal, Machete, WY
- Producers: Nesty "La Mente Maestra", Victor "El Nasi", Marioso, Tainy, Luny Tunes

Singles from La Revolución - Evolution
- 1. "Imagínate" Released: November 2, 2009; 2. "Gracias a Tí (Remix)" Released: November 10, 2009; 3. "Te Siento" Released: January 15, 2010; 4. "Desaparecio" Released: February 2010

"La Revolución Evolution" (La Evolución in Latin American edition) is the name of the re-release album of La Revolución, released on November 23, 2009. This album include all songs of La Revolución except the track "Descará". However, it includes five new tracks and remixes as well as an extra DVD that includes behind-the-scenes footage of Wisin & Yandel’s worldwide tour and the music videos for "Gracias a Tí" (including the version with Enrique Iglesias), "Imagínate" and "Abusadora". The album earned the Lo Nuestro Award for Urban Album of the Year.

== Track listing ==
CD 1

1. La Revolución
2. Quítame el Dolor
3. Encendio
4. Mujeres in the Club (featuring 50 Cent)
5. Ahí Voy
6. Emociones
7. Gracias a Ti
8. Perfecto (featuring Yaviah & Ivy Queen)
9. Abusadora
10. Ella Me Llama
11. Yo Lo Sé
12. Como Quieres Que Te Olvide (featuring Ednita Nazario)
13. Vives en Mí
14. Besos Mojados
15. Descara (featuring Yomo)

CD 2

1. Sandungueo (featuring Franco “El Gorila", Yomo & Gadiel)
2. Te Siento
3. Imagínate (featuring T-Pain)
4. All Up To You (featuring Aventura y Akon)
5. Pasan Los Días
6. Desaparecio (featuring Tico & Gadiel)
7. Ella Me Llama (Remix) (featuring Akon)
8. Gracias A Ti (Remix) (featuring Enrique Iglesias)
