= 2009 Premios Juventud =

6th Premios Juventud
- Date: July 16, 2009
- Location: Watsco Center in Miami, Florida
- Hosted by: Anahí, Juan Soler, Karyme Lozano, Pee Wee
- Website: Official Page

Television/radio coverage
- Network: Univision

The 6th Annual Premios Juventud (Youth Awards) were broadcast by Univision on July 16, 2009.

== Winners and nominees ==
S.No.	Category	Sub - Categories	Winner	Other Nominees
1)	Fashion And Images	Quiero Vestir Como Ella (She's Got Style)	Jennifer Lopez	Anahí; Dulce María; Maite Perroni
1)	Fashion And Images	El de Mejor Estilo (He's Got Style)	Luis Fonsi	Alfonso Herrera; Christopher von Uckermann; William Levy
1)	Fashion And Images	¡Está Buenísimo! (What a Hottie!)	William Levy	Alfonso Herrera; Christopher von Uckermann; Luis Fonsi
1)	Fashion And Images	Chica que me Quita el Sueño (Girl of my Dreams)	Maite Perroni	Anahí; Dulce María; Thalía
2)	Film	¡Qué Actorazo! (Can He Act or What?)	Eugenio Derbez	Antonio Banderas; Daddy Yankee; Gael García Bernal
2)	Film	Actriz que se Roba la Pantalla (She Steals the Show)	Kate del Castillo	Ana Claudia Talancón; Michelle Rodríguez; Penélope Cruz
2)	Film	Película Más Padre (Favorite Flick)	La Misma Luna	Beverly Hills Chihuahua; Talento de Barrio; Vicky Cristina Barcelona
3)	Music	La Combinacion Perfecta (The Perfect Combination)	"Aquí Estoy Yo" - Luis Fonsi, Aleks Syntek, David Bisbal, Noel Schajris and Alejandro Sanz	"Dos Hombres y Un Destino" - David Bustamante with Axel; "Lloro Por Ti" - Enrique Iglesias with Wisin & Yandel; "El Regalo Mas Grande" - Tiziano Ferro, Anahí and Dulce María
3)	Music	¡Qué Rico se Mueve! (Best Moves)	Chayanne	Christopher Uckerman; Dulce María; Ricky Martin
3)	Music	Voz del Momento (Voice of the Moment)	Luis Fonsi	Aventura; Dulce María; Wisin & Yandel
3)	Music	La Más Pegajosa (Catchiest Tune)	"No Me Doy Por Vencido": Luis Fonsi	"El Verano" - Dulce María; "Me Estás Tentando" - Wisin & Yandel; "Para Olvidarte De Mí" - RBD
3)	Music	Me Muero Sin Ese CD (CD To Die For)	Palabras del Silencio: Luis Fonsi	El Fenómeno - Arcángel; Talento de Barrio - Daddy Yankee; Wisin & Yandel Presentan: La Mente Maestra - DJ Nesty & Wisin & Yandel
3)	Music	Mi concierto favorito (My Favorite Concert)	Enrique Iglesias with Aventura	Daddy Yankee; Jenni Rivera; RBD
3)	Music	Canción Corta-venas (Best Ballad)	"No Me Doy Por Vencido": Luis Fonsi	"Absurda Cenicienta" - Chenoa; "Aquí Estoy Yo" - Luis Fonsi, Aleks Syntek, David Bisbal, Noel Schajris and Alejandro Sanz; "Para Olvidarte De Mi" - RBD
3)	Music	Mi Video favorito (My favorite Video)	"Aquí Estoy Yo" - Luis Fonsi, Aleks Syntek, David Bisbal, Noel Schajris and Alejandro Sanz	"Me Estás Tentando" - Wisin & Yandel; "Para Olvidarte De Mí" - RBD; "Por Amar a Ciegas" - Arcángel
3)	Music	Mi Ringtone (My Ringtone)	"Me Estás Tentando" - Wisin & Yandel	"No me doy por vencido" - Luis Fonsi; "Para Olvidarte De Mi" - RBD; "Llamado de Emergencia" - Daddy Yankee
3)	Music	Mi Artista Regional Mexicano Favorito Es... (Favorite Regional Mexican Artist)	Jenni Rivera	Alacranes Musical; Alejandro Fernández; La Arrolladora Banda El Limón; Vicente Fernández
3)	Music	Mi Artista Rock Favorito Es... (Favorite Rock Artist)	Maná	Alejandra Guzmán; Juanes; Moderatto; Beto Cuevas
3)	Music	Mi artista pop favorito es... (Favorite Pop Artist)	Luis Fonsi	Dulce María; Enrique Iglesias; Thalía; Chenoa
3)	Music	Mi Artista Tropical Favorito Es... (Favorite Tropical Artist)	Aventura	Fanny Lú; Marc Anthony; Olga Tañón; Víctor Manuelle
3)	Music	Mi Artista Urbano Favorito Es... (Favorite Urban Artist)	Daddy Yankee	Arcángel; Don Omar; Miguelito
4)	Pop Culture	Mi Idolo Es (My Idol Is)	Luis Fonsi	Anahí; Christopher Uckerman; Dulce María
4)	Pop Culture	Tórridos Romances (Hottest Romance)	Adamari López and Luis Fonsi	Anahí And Rodrigo Ruiz de Teresa; Dulce María And Pablo Lyle; Mayrín Villanueva And Eduardo Santamarina
4)	Pop Culture	En la Mira de los Paparazzi (Paparazzi's Favorite Target)	Elvis Crespo	Anahí; Dulce María; Luis Miguel
5)	Sports	El Deportista de Alto Voltaje (Most Electrifying Guy Jock)	Alex Rodríguez: Baseball	Cuauhtémoc Blanco - Football; Guillermo Ochoa - Football; Omar Bravo - Football
5)	Sports	La Deportista de Alta Tensión (Most Electrifying Girl Jock)	Lorena Ochoa	María del Rosario "Chayito" Espinoza; Marta; Milka Duno
5)	Sports	Me Pongo la Camiseta de... (I’m a Die-Hard Fan of...)	New York Yankees	Las Águilas; Las Chivas; Selección Mexicana
5)	Sports	La nueva Promesa (The New Pledge)	Juan Manuel López	Carlos Vela; Javier "Chicharito" Hernández; Omar Arellano

== Special awards ==
=== Most Searched (Internet) ===
RBD

== Performers ==
- Intro — "Premios Juventud 2009"
- Paulina Rubio — "Causa Y Efecto"
- Alacranes Musical — "Fue Su Amor"
- Alexis & Fido — "Ojos Que No Ven"
- Alicia Villarreal — "Caso Perdido"
- Anahí — "Mi Delirio"
- La Arrolladora Banda El Limón —
- Cristian Castro - "Por La Espalda"
- Da' Zoo — "Chitu"
- German Montero — "Comprendeme"
- Luis Fonsi — "Llueve Por Dentro"
- Cruz Martínez y Los Super Reyes featuring Frankie J — "Eres (Remix)"
- Makano — "Te Amo"
- Marc Anthony featuring La Quinta Estación — "Recuérdame"
- Pee Wee — "Cumbaya"
- Ricardo Arjona — "Como Duele"
- Shaila Dúrcal —
- Tito "El Bambino" — "El Amor"
- Wisin & Yandel — "Abusadora"

== Presenters ==
- Anahí
- Alacranes Musical
- Aleks Syntek
- Alessandra Rosaldo
- Alexander Acha
- Alexis & Fido
- Alicia Villarreal
- Arcángel
- Ariel López Padilla - Actor
- Aventura
- La Arrolladora Banda El Limón
- Beto Cuevas
- Carlos Calderón - TV personality
- Chenoa
- Christopher von Uckermann
- Cristian Castro
- Cruz Martínez y Los Super Reyes
- Da Zoo
- Eiza González
- Eugenio Dervez - Actor
- Fanny Lú
- Germán Montero
- Greidys Gil - Model
- Guy Ecker - Actor
- Jesse & Joy
- Jorge Celedon & Jimmy Zambrano
- Juan Soler - Actor
- Kany García
- Karla Martínez - TV personality
- Karyme Lozano - Actress
- Kate del Castillo - Actress
- La Quinta Estación
- Lili Estefan - TV personality
- Luis Fonsi
- Makano
- Maki - Actress
- Marc Anthony
- Miguelito
- Olga Tañón
- Paulina Rubio
- Paty Cantú
- Pee Wee
- Playa Limbo
- Rafael Mercadante - Actor
- Ricardo Arjona
- Shaila Dúrcal
- Tito "El Bambino"
- Wisin & Yandel
- Yahir
