= Los Vaqueros: El Regreso =

Los Vaqueros 2: El Regreso

Studio album by Wisin & Yandel
- Released: January 25, 2011
- Recorded: Jun 2010 – Jan 2011
- Genre: Pop; reggaeton
- Length: 61:29 (standard edition); 90:46 (deluxe edition)
- Label: Machete, WY
- Producer: Wisin & Yandel (also executive); Edgar Andino, Nesty "La Mente Maestra", Víctor "El Nasi", Tainy, Sean Kingston, GoodWill & MGI

Wisin & Yandel chronology
La Revolución: Live (2010)	Los Vaqueros 2: El Regreso (2011)	Los Lideres (2012)

Singles from Los Vaqueros 2: El Regreso
- 1. "Zun Zun Rompiendo Caderas" Released: December 7, 2010; 2. "Tu Olor" Released: June 14, 2011

Los Vaqueros 2: El Regreso (English: The Cowboys 2: The Return) is the seventh studio album by Reggaeton duo Wisin & Yandel. Featured guests are not only signed to WY Records, but also non-Latino artists from the hip hop genre as T-Pain, 50 Cent and Sean Kingston. The album was released on January 25, 2011, through Universal. This album is the sequel to Los Vaqueros.

== Background ==
In conjunction with the promotion of their live album La Revolución: Live, in June 2010 the duó announced to work on the continuation of their successful 2006 album Los Vaqueros. The same month it were confirmed collaborations with Tego Calderón, Franco "El Gorila", Cosculluela and De La Ghetto on the track "La Reunión De Los Vaqueros" song that later was included on their live album, as well the release date confirmed to November 2010. Later, they announced the track "Tu Olor" as the album's first single but was changed for "Zun Zun Rompiendo Caderas". Early November 2010, they announced the album's first single will feature American rappers 50 Cent and T-Pain, as well the album's title. The album cover for the Deluxe Edition and track list was revealed on December 18, 2010.

== Reception ==
=== Commercial performance ===
In United States, the first week prediction were between 35-40k. However Los Vaqueros 2: El Regreso debuted at #8 with sales of 31,000 on the Billboard 200. It became Wisin & Yandel's second top ten album and highest album debut on the top ten after La Revolución debuted at #7 in 2009. It also debuted at #1 on the Billboard Top Latin Albums, and became their fifth number one album on the chart. On the Top Rap Albums the album debuted at #2, becoming on their highest debut on the chart, it also peaked at #1 on Billboard's Latin Rhythm Albums chart and was the best-selling album in Puerto Rico at the time. It was the 5th Best Selling Latin Album in the United States with 123,000 copies sold.

On the Mexican Albums Chart the album debuted at #1 under the title El Regreso de Los Vaqueros, becoming on their third number one album on the chart.

=== Critical response ===
Professional ratings
Review scores
Source	Rating
Allmusic	3.5/5 stars

John Bush from Allmusic said that "It's an LP that's meant to evoke 2006's crew-laden Los Vaqueros, which firmly established reggaeton's first family with appearances by Don Omar and Franco "El Gorilla", as well as a host of newcomers. This one is similarly studded with nearly a dozen stars and up-and-coming talents—Unlike many of their contemporaries, who clearly can't contain a parade of collaborators in a seamless whole, Wisin & Yandel easily shuttle between pop, urban, and reggaeton with few speed bumps." Frances Tirado from Primerahora said that "This album is great for the fans of reggaeton, because the lyrics speak mainly of the club environment and conquer of girls, the love and heartbreak -- Music producers participating, injected the electronic dance sounds of classic reggaeton to make a solid urban music." Los Vaqueros received a nomination for a Lo Nuestro Award for Urban Album of the Year.

== Singles ==
- "Zun Zun Rompiendo Caderas" was released as the first official single on December 7, 2010. The music video was premiered in January 2011, directed by long-time collaborator Jessy Terrero. The single debuted at no. 50 on the US Latin Songs, and peaked at no. 12.
- "Tu Olor" was released as the second single from the album, the song is currently charted on the US Latin Songs at number 32, and number 14 on the US Latin Pop Songs. A music video was filmed and released.

=== Other releases ===
- "No Dejemos Que Se Apague" was released to digital marketplaces on December 21, 2010, the song features rappers 50 Cent and T-Pain. The music video was released in December 2010, also directed by Jessy Terrero. The song has not been released officially as single.

== Track listing ==
- The duó co-wrote every song on the album. Others who worked on the songs are given below.

Standard Edition
No.	Title	Writer(s)	Length
1.	"Intro (Los Vaqueros)" (featuring Gallego)	Ernesto F. Padilla, Víctor Martínez	2:20
2.	"Muévete"	Marcos Masis	3:48
3.	"Tu Olor"	F. Padilla, Martínez	4:05
4.	"No Dejemos Que Se Apague" (featuring T-Pain & 50 Cent)	Faheem Rasheed Najm, F. Padilla, Martínez	4:25
5.	"Se Acabo" (featuring Tito El Bambino)	Ramon Luis Otero, Efraín David Fines, F. Padilla, Martínez	4:24
6.	"Cállate"	F. Padilla, Martínez	4:22
7.	"Sigan Bailando" (featuring Tego Calderón & Franco El Gorila)	Tego Calderón, Luis F. Cortes, F. Padilla, Martínez	4:51
8.	"Fever" (featuring Sean Kingston)	Kisean Paul Anderson, Will Rapaport, Henri Lanz	3:38
9.	"Zun Zun Rompiendo Caderas"	Masis	3:20
10.	"Perréame" (featuring Jowell & Randy)	Giann Arias, Kristian Ginorio, David Torres, Joel Muñoz	4:50
11.	"Tomando El Control" (featuring Jayko & Gadiel)	John Steve Correa, Masis	3:25
12.	"Mi Tesoro"	Masis	4:35
13.	"Suavecito Despacio" (featuring Alexis & Fido)	Joel Martínez, Raúl Alexis Ortíz, F. Padilla, Martínez	4:50
14.	"Ya No Queda Amor"	Masis	4:01
15.	"Uy Uy Uy" (Wisin featuring Franco El Gorila & O’Neill)	F. Cortes, Masis, F. Padilla	4:40

Deluxe Edition - Disc 2 / Bonus Tracks
No.	Title	Writer(s)	Length
1.	"Party"	Masis, Martínez	3:39
2.	"Se Viste" (Wisin featuring Gadiel)	Masis, Martínez	3:40
3.	"Tortura"	Orlando Aponte, Masis, Martínez	4:09
4.	"Tumbao" (Yandel featuring De La Ghetto)	Masis, Rafael Castillo	4:37
5.	"La Reunión De Los Vaqueros" (featuring Cosculluela, Tego Calderón, De La Ghetto & Franco El Gorila)	Martinez, F. Padilla, Calderón, F. Cortes, Castillo, José Fernando Cosculluela	5:32
6.	"Estoy Enamorado"	Jose Gómez, Martinez, F. Padilla	4:32
7.	"Irresistible"	Masis	3:07
8.	"Zun Zun "Rompiendo Caderas" (Remix)" (featuring Pitbull & Tego Calderon / track not included in the venezolan version)	Masis, Martinez	3:45

Deluxe Edition – Bonus DVD
No.	Title	Length
1.	"No Dejemos Que Se Apague" (Music Video)
2.	"La Reunión De Los Vaqueros" (featuring Cosculluela, Tego Calderón, De La Ghetto & Franco El Gorila) (Music Video)
3.	"Estoy Enamorado" (Music Video)
4.	"Irresistible" (Music Video)

== Personnel ==
Taken and adapted from Allmusic.com.

- Juan Luis Morera (Wisin) – composer, executive producer
- Llandel Veguilla (Yandel) – composer, executive producer
- Edgar Andino – executive producer, management
- Ernesto F. Padilla (Nesty "La Mente Maestra") – composer, producer
- Víctor Martínez – composer, producer
- Marcos Masis (Tainy) – composer, producer
- Kisean Paul Anderson – composer, producer
- GoodWill – composer, producer
- MGI – composer, producer
- Giann Arias – composer
- Tegui Calderón – composer
- John Steve Correa – composer
- Luis F. Cortes – composer (Franco El Gorilla)
- Kristian Ginorio – composer
- Henri Lanz – composer
- Raul "Alexis" Ortiz – composer
- Joel "Fido" Martínez – composer
- Joel Muñoz – composer
- Faheem Rasheed Najm – composer
- Ramon Luis Otero – composer
- Will Rapaport – composer
- Efraín David Fines – composer
- David Torres – composer
- José "El Profesor" Gómez – composer
- José Fernando Cosculluela – composer
- Rafael Castillo – composer
- Orlando Aponte – composer
- Iancarlo Reyes – creative director
- Paco López – label manager
- Jose "Hyde" Cotto – mixing
- Edwin David – photography
- Ana Alvarado – production coordination

== Charts and certifications ==
=== Charts ===
Chart (2011)	Peak position
Ecuadorian Album Charts	20
Mexican Albums Chart	1
Mexican International Chart Albums	1
US Top Latin Albums	1
US Top Rap Albums	2
US Latin Rhythm Albums	1
US Billboard 200	8
Venezuelan Albums (Recordland)	20

=== Certifications ===
Region	Certification	Certified units/sales
Mexico (AMPROFON)	Gold	30,000^{^}
^{^} Shipments figures based on certification alone.

== See also ==
- List of number-one albums of 2011 (Mexico)
- List of number-one Billboard Latin Albums from the 2010s
