= Welcome to the Jungle (Franco "El Gorila" album) =

Studio album by Franco "El Gorila"
- Released: April 21, 2009 (Puerto Rico) - April 28, 2009 (United States)
- Recorded: 2008
- Genre: Reggaeton, hip hop, merengue
- Label: WY Records, Machete
- Producer: Wisin & Yandel (exec.), Nesty "La Mente Maestra", Victor "el Nasi", MarioSo, Tainy

Franco "El Gorila" chronology
Welcome to the Jungle (2009)	La Verdadera Maquina (2011)

Singles from Welcome to the Jungle
- 1. "He Querido Quererte" Released: March 31, 2009

Professional ratings
Review scores
Source	Rating
AllMusic	3.5/5 stars

Welcome to the Jungle is the debut studio album by Puerto Rican rapper and songwriter Franco "El Gorila". The album was released on April 21, 2009 in Puerto Rico and on April 28, 2009 in the United States by record label WY Records, distributed by Machete Music. The production includes 14 songs and collaborations with Wisin, Yandel, Franco, like Jayko "El Prototipo", Tico "El Inmigrante", Yavíah and Tony Dize.

== Track list ==
1. "Asi Soy" (featuring Yandel) (produced by Nesty and Victor) - 4:19
2. "Duro" (produced by Tainy, Victor and Marioso) - 2:51
3. "Pa' Lo Oscuro" (featuring Yaviah, Wisin & Yandel) (produced by Nesty and Victor) - 5:20
4. "Con Swing" (produced by Nesty and Victor) - 2:50
5. "Me Estoy Muriendo" (featuring Wisin) (produced by Nesty and Victor) - 4:36
6. "Que Te Entregues" (produced by Nesty, Victor, Gomez and Marioso) - 3:19
7. "Sexo Seguro" (featuring Yandel) (produced by RKO, Nesty and Victor) - 3:40
8. "Psiquiatrica Loca" (produced by Sosa and Monserrrate) - 2:53
9. "Millonario" (featuring Jayko and Cosculluela) (produced by Nesty and Victor) - 3:17
10. "Torturame" (produced by Tainy and Victor) - 2:56
11. "He Querido Quererte" (featuring Tico "El Inmigrante") (produced by Nesty, Victor and Marioso) - 3:29
12. "Ella Es Agresiva" (featuring Tony Dize) (produced by Montana) - 3:56
13. "Camila" (produced by Nesty, Victor, Gomez and Marioso) - 4:07
14. "Vamos A Hacerlo" (featuring Yandel) (produced by Nesty and Victor) - 2:49

== Chart performance ==
The album debuted at #17 on the U.S. Billboard Top Latin Albums and it has so far peaked at #5, making it a success.

Chart (2009)	Peak position
U.S. Billboard Top Heatseekers	27
U.S. Billboard Top Heatseekers (South Atlantic)	1
U.S. Billboard Top Latin Albums	5
U.S. Billboard Latin Rhythm Albums	3
U.S. Billboard 200	196

== Certifications ==
Region	Certification	Certified units/sales
United States (RIAA)	Gold (Latin)	30,000^{‡}
^{‡} Sales+streaming figures based on certification alone.
