= WY Records =

Puerto Rican record label

- Parent company: Universal Music Group
- Founded: 2005; 21 years ago
- Founder: Wisin & Yandel
- Defunct: 2013; 13 years ago
- Distributor: Machete Music
- Genre: Reggaeton
- Location: Los Angeles, California, U.S.

WY Records was a record label founded in the United States by the popular reggaeton duo Wisin & Yandel, which operated between 2005 and 2013.

== Artists ==
- Wisin & Yandel
- Gadiel Veguilla
- Franco El Gorila
- Jowell y Randy
- Jayko El Prototipo
- El Tío Yamile Omar
- Lobo
- Tony Dize
- O'Neill
- Tico El Inmigrante

== Producers and composers ==
- Tainy
- Wisin & Yandel
- O'Neill
- Chris Jedi
- Jumbo el Que Produce Solo
- Ear Candy
- Hyde Químico
- Los Legendarios
- Nely el Arma Secreta
- Nesty la Mente Maestra

== Previous artists on WY Records ==
- Tony Dize (2005 - 2009)
- Franco "El Gorila" (2005 - 2012)
- Gadiel Veguilla (2005 - 2012)
- Yomile Omar "El Tio" (2005 - 2006)
- Jowell & Randy (2009 - 2012)
- Yaviah (2009 - 2011)
- Jayko (2007 - 2012)
- Tico "El Inmigrante" (2008 - 2012)
- O'Neill (2008 - 2012)

== Previous producers ==
- Nesty la Mente Maestra
- Víctor el Nasi
- Marioso
- RKO
- El Profesor Gómez
- DJ Casper

== Associated labels ==
- Machete Music
- Lideres Entertainment Group
- Fresh Productions
- La Leyenda LLC
- Y Entertainment Records Inc
- Universal Music Group
- MultiMillo Records
- Dimelo Vi
- White Lion

== Discography ==
Year	Information
2005	Wisin & Yandel - Pa'l Mundo: Released: November 8, 2005; Singles: "Rakata", "Mírala Bien", "Llamé Pa' Verte (Bailando Sexy)", "Noche de Sexo"; RIAA certification: 4× Platinum
2006	Wisin & Yandel - Pa'l Mundo: Deluxe Edition: Released: May 16, 2006; Singles: "Pam Pam", "Toma", "Sácala" "Burn It Up"
2006	Various Artists - Los Vaqueros: Released: November 7, 2006; Singles: "Pegao", "Yo Te Quiero"
2007	Wisin & Yandel - Pa'l Mundo: All Access Live: Released: March 13, 2007
2007	Wisin & Yandel - 2010 Lost Edition: Released: May 22, 2007
2007	Wisin & Yandel - Pa'l Mundo: First Class Delivery: Released: July 10, 2007
2007	Various Artists - Los Vaqueros Wild Wild Mixes: Released: July 24, 2007
2007	Wisin & Yandel - Tomando Control: Live: Released: September 25, 2007
2007	Wisin & Yandel - Wisin vs. Yandel: Los Extraterrestres: Released: November 6, 2007; Singles: "Sexy Movimiento", "Ahora Es", "Oye, ¿Dónde Está El Amor?"; RIAA certification: 3× Platinum
2008	Tony Dize - La Melodía de la Calle: Released: April 22, 2008; Singles: "Permítame", "Entre Los Dos", "Vamos A Hacerlo"
2008	Wisin & Yandel - Los Extraterrestres: Otra Dimensión: Released: May 27, 2008; Singles: "Síguelo", "Dime Que Te Paso",
2008	DJ Nesty and Wisin & Yandel - Wisin & Yandel Presentan: La Mente Maestra: Released: November 11, 2008; Singles: "Me Estás Tentando", "Me Estás Tendando (Remix), "Cositas Macabras", "Desnudémonos", "Sex"
2009	Franco "El Gorila" - Welcome to the Jungle: Released: April 28, 2009; Singles: "He Querido Quererte", "He Querido Quererte (Reimx)"
2009	Wisin & Yandel - La Revolución: Released: May 26, 2009; Singles: "Mujeres in the Club", "Abusadora", "Gracias A Tí"; RIAA certification: 3× Platinum
2009	Wisin & Yandel - La Revolución - Evolution: Released: November 23, 2009; Singles: "Gracias a Tí (Remix)", "Imagínate", "Te Siento", "Te Siento (Remix)"
2010	Various Artists - Wisin & Yandel Presentan: WY Records: Lo Mejor De La Compañía: Released: March 23, 2010
2010	Jowell & Randy - El Momento: Released: May 4, 2010; Singles: "Un Booty Nuevo", "Loco", "Loco (Remix)", "Mi Dama De Colombia", "Goodbye", "Mi Dama De Colombia (Remix)", "Dile A Él", "Solo Por Tí"
2010	Wisin & Yandel - La Revolución: Live: Released: September 21, 2010; Singles: "Irresistible", "Estoy Enamorado", "La Reunión De Los Vaqueros"
2011	Wisin & Yandel - Los Vaqueros: El Regreso: Released: January 25, 2011; Singles: "No Dejemos Que Se Apague", "Zun Zun Rompiendo Caderas", "Tu Olor"
2011	Gadiel - 5 Estrellas (Mixtape): Released: April 30, 2011; Singles: "Puesto Pa' Tí", "Pégate"
2011	Franco "El Gorila" - La Verdadera Maquina: Released: November 15, 2011; Singles: "Mi Música Buena", "Cuando Cae La Noche", "Nobody Like You"
2012	Wisin & Yandel - Líderes: Released: July 3, 2012; Singles: "Follow the Leader", "Algo Me Gusta de Ti"
