= La Verdadera Maquina =

Studio album by Franco "El Gorila"
- Released: November 15, 2011
- Recorded: 2010–2011
- Genre: Reggaeton
- Length: 50:25
- Label: WY Records
- Producers: Wisin & Yandel (as executives), Luis F. Cortes Torres (as an executive), ives]] Hyde "El Verdadero Quimico"; Chris Jedai; O'Neil; Hi-Flow; Tainy; Los Evo Jedis; Los Hitmen; Jeffra "El Diestro "El Profesor" Gomez

Franco "El Gorila" chronology
Welcome To The Jungle (2009)	La Verdadera Maquina (2011)	Back To The Jungle ((TBA))

Singles from La Verdadera Maquina
- 1. "Mi Música Buena" Released: July 9, 2011; 2. "Cuando Cae La Noche" Released: August 27, 2011; 3. "Nobody Like You" Released: September 13, 2011

La Verdadera Maquina (The Real Machine) is the second studio album by WY Records artist Franco "El Gorila" released on November 15, 2011. It featured collaborations with top reggaeton stars such as Cosculluela, Wisin & Yandel, Jowell & Randy & Arcángel.

== Track listing ==
#	Title	Producer(s)	Length
1	Nobody Like You (English Version) (feat. O'Neill)	Chris Jedai, Hi-Flow, Hyde & O'Neil	4:26
2	Muñeca	Hi-Flow, Hyde, O'Neil & Tainy	3:50
3	Cuando Cae La Noche (feat. Cosculluela)	Chris Jedai, Hyde & O'Neil	4:08
4	Quema Quema	Hi-Flow, Hyde & Tainy	3:05
5	Mi Música Buena (feat. Yandel)	Hi-Flow, Hyde, DJ Urba & Rome	4:32
6	Ella Pide De Eso	Chris Jedai, Hi-Flow, Hyde & O'Neil	3:22
7	Duelo (feat. Wisin & O'Neil)	Chris Jedai, Hi-Flow, Hyde & O'Neil	4:14
8	Reza Por Mi	Chris Jedai, Hyde & O'Neil	4:35
9	Rewind Selecta	Chris Jedai & Hyde	2:59
10	Party De Marquesina (feat. Jowell & Randy)	Hyde & Los Hitmen (Lelo & Jaz-Z)	4:21
11	Love Machine	Hyde, Jeffra "El Diestro" & O'Neil	3:27
12	Dinero y Fama (feat. Arcangel)	Chris Jedai & Hyde	3:54
13	Una Noche Más	Chris Jedai, Profesor Gomez & Hyde	3:38

=== Digital download bonus tracks ===
Track #	Title	Featured Artist(s)	Producer(s)	Length
14	Me Busque a Otra	Tico "El Inmigrante", Gadiel & Jayko "El Prototipo"	Hyde "El Verdadero Quimico" & Tainy	4:01
15	Ayer De Nuevo Lloré			4:10
16	Nobody Like You (Spanish Version)	O'Neil	Chris Jedai, Hi-Flow, Hyde "El Verdadero Quimico" & O'Neil	4:24

== Charts ==
Chart (2012)	Peak position
US Top Latin Albums	32
