= Imagínate (song) =

Single by Wisin & Yandel featuring T-Pain

from the album La Revolución: Evolution
- Released: November 2, 2009
- Genre: R&B, Hip hop
- Length: 4:44
- Label: WY Records, Machete
- Songwriter(s): Juan Luis Morena, Llandel Veguilla, Faheem Rasheed Najm, Victor Martinez, Ernesto Padilla
- Producer(s): Nesty "La Mente Maestra", Victor "El Nasi"

Wisin & Yandel singles chronology
"Gracias a Tí" (2009)	"Imagínate" (2009)	"Te Siento" (2009)

T-Pain singles chronology
"One More Drink" (2008)	"Imaginate" (2009)	"Take Your Shirt Off" (2009)

"Imagínate" (English: Imagine) is a song by Puerto Rican reggaeton duo Wisin & Yandel. It is the first single from the album's re-release of La Revolución titled La Revolución: Evolution, released on November 2, 2009. The song features American singer T-Pain. The song failed in any Billboard component chart as it garnered little airplay.

== Music video ==
The music video was filmed movie-style on a graveyard in Los Angeles in October 2009, in conjunction with the music video for "Te Siento", including guest appearances of actors Amaury Nolasco, Paula Garcés, Wilmer Valderrama and fellow Reggaeton singer Franco "El Gorila".

The music video shows a dramatic story of a love triangle between two men and a woman, played by Amaury, Paula and Wilmer, arriving to suffer tragic consequences. Wisin & Yandel are part of the drama as friends of one of the protagonists. Through the sequence of the video, it shows T-Pain into a car, while it rains. It was directed by Jessy Terrero, premiered on November 2, 2009.
