= Jessy Terrero =

Dominican film and music video director (born 1972)

- Born: October 7, 1972 (age 53); Dominican Republic
- Occupations: Film and music video director
- Website: www.cinemagiants.com

Jessy Terrero (born October 7, 1972) is a Dominican film and music video director.

== Career ==
Terrero appeared as an extra on the 1992 film Juice starring Tupac Shakur. According to Terrero, it was his experience on the set of the movie that inspired him to become a director.

Terrero shot his first student film on Super 8. After college, he landed an associate producer internship on the set of Darnell Martin's I Like It Like That.

In 1996, he teamed up with his brother and formed T and T Casting, supervising extras casting for low-budget films.

His acting credits include appearances in Law & Order, The Sopranos and In Search of a Dream (Buscando un sueño).

Tererro's film director credits include the short film The Clinic. He made his movie directorial debut with the film Soul Plane in 2004. In 2009 Brooklyn to Manhattan was in production. Terrero also directed Freelancers, starring Robert De Niro, Forest Whitaker, and 50 Cent. The movie was released in 2012.

In 2014, Terrero founded Cinema Giants. In addition to being the production house for music videos, Cinema Giants has also served as a production company for films and television. Directors currently associated with Cinema Giants include Terrero, Mike Ho, Rodrigo Films, Roxana Baldovin, and Steven Gomillion.

Terrero directed Nicky Jam: El Ganador, a bio-series about the life and career of reggaeton artist Nicky Jam. The series was released on Netflix in Latin America on 30 November 2018, and on Telemundo in the U.S. and Puerto Rico in 2019.

Terrero directed the YouTube Originals documentary Maluma: Lo Que Era, Lo Que Soy, Lo Que Seré, a documentary about Colombian singer Maluma. It premiered on 5 June 2019. The next year, on 7 October 2020, Bravas, another YouTube original series produced and directed by Terrero, was released. The series, in addition to Terrero, was also executive produced by Dominican singer Natti Natasha.

Terrero is best known for directing music videos for an international clientele of famous artists including Jill Scott, Lionel Richie, Syleena Johnson, 50 Cent, Wisin y Yandel, Daddy Yankee, Ludacris, Akon, Paulina Rubio, Enrique Iglesias, Sean Paul, Aventura, and many others. Since 2000, Terrero's name has become linked with hip hop and reggaeton for directing popular videos for critically acclaimed artists such as Wisin y Yandel, 50 Cent, G-Unit, Daddy Yankee, and Don Omar. In 2009, Terrero directed Wisin y Yandel's MTV VMA-nominated video "Abusadora."

In recent years, Terrero has found success working with artists such as Ricky Martin, Maluma, Nicky Jam, J Balvin, Bad Bunny, Jennifer Lopez, and the Weeknd, among other artists.

== Filmography ==
=== As actor ===
Film
| Year | Film | Role | Notes |
|---|---|---|---|
| 1997 | Buscando un sueño | Yeyo | |
| 1998 | Better Living | Biker #1 | |
| 2006 | The Confession | Casper Delgado | Direct-to-video |
Television
| Year | Title | Role | Notes |
| 1997 | Brooklyn South | Skel #2 | 1 episode |
| 1998 | Law & Order | Shorty | 1 episode |
| 1999 | The Sopranos | Gallegos | 1 episode |
| 2007 | America's Next Top Model | Himself/Guest Judge | 1 episode |
| 2008 | Model Latina | Himself/Music Video Director/Guest Judge | 1 episode |

=== As director ===
Film
| Year | Film | Notes |
|---|---|---|
| 2002 | The Clinic | Short film |
| 2004 | Soul Plane | Also produced |
| 2010 | Brooklyn to Manhattan | |
| 2010 | Gun | |
| 2012 | Freelancers | |
| 2019 | Maluma: Lo Que Era, Lo Que Soy, Lo Que Seré | YouTube Premium exclusive documentary |

Television
| Year | Title |
|---|---|
| 2018 | Nicky Jam: El Ganador |
| 2020 | Bravas |

== Music videography ==
- 2000: "Deport Them" - Sean Paul
- 2000: "Gettin' In the Way" - Jill Scott
- 2000: "A Long Walk" - Jill Scott
- 2001: "Tarantula" - Mystikal ft. Butch Cassidy
- 2001: "I" - Petey Pablo ft. Timbaland
- 2001: "Raise Up" - Petey Pablo
- 2001: "Lifetime" - Prophet Jones
- 2001: "Parents Just Don't Understand"- Lil' Romeo ft. 3LW and Nick Cannon
- 2002: "Wanksta" - 50 Cent
- 2002: "Good Times" - Styles P
- 2003: "Many Men" - 50 Cent
- 2003: "Right Thurr" - Chingy
- 2003: "Too Much for Me" - DJ Kay Slay ft. Amerie & Foxy Brown
- 2004: "Wanna Get to Know You" - G-Unit ft. Joe
- 2004: "Smile" - G-Unit
- 2004: "On Fire" - Lloyd Banks
- 2004: "Lean Back" - Terror Squad
- 2005: "Candy Shop" - 50 Cent ft. Olivia
- 2005: "We Be Burnin'" - Sean Paul
- 2005: "No Daddy" - Teairra Mari
- 2005: "And Then What" - Young Jeezy ft. Mannie Fresh
- 2005: "Can You Believe It" - Styles P ft. Akon
- 2005: "She Says" - Unwritten Law
- 2006: "Say Goodbye" - Chris Brown
- 2006: "Conteo" - Don Omar
- 2006: "Give It To Me" - Mobb Deep ft. Young Buck
- 2006: "Los Infieles" - Aventura
- 2006: "Noche de Entierro (Nuestro Amor)" - Daddy Yankee, Wisin & Yandel, Héctor el Father, Tony Tun-Tun & Zion
- 2006: "Yo Te Quiero" - Wisin & Yandel
- 2006: "Runaway Love" - Ludacris ft. Mary J. Blige
- 2006: "Never Gonna Be The Same" - Sean Paul
- 2006: "Show Stopper" - Danity Kane ft. Yung Joc
- 2007: "Dimelo" - Enrique Iglesias
- 2007: "Sexy Movimiento" - Wisin & Yandel
- 2007: "Ahora Es" - Wisin & Yandel
- 2007: "Watch Them Roll" - Sean Paul
- 2007: "I'll Still Kill" - 50 Cent ft. Akon
- 2008: "Oye, ¿Dónde Está El Amor?" - Wisin & Yandel
- 2008: "Back to You" - Veze ft. MYRA
- 2008: "Síguelo" - Wisin & Yandel
- 2008: "Dime Qué Te Pasó" - Wisin & Yandel
- 2008: "Me Estás Tentando" - Wisin & Yandel
- 2008: "Bleeding Love" - Leona Lewis
- 2008: "Pose" - Daddy Yankee
- 2008: "I Like the Way She Do It" - G-Unit
- 2008: "Rider Pt. 2" - G-Unit
- 2008: "Vacation" - Young Jeezy
- 2009: "Me Estás Tentando" [Official Remix] - Wisin & Yandel ft. Franco "El Gorilla" & Jayko "El Prototipo"
- 2009: "Por Un Segundo" - Aventura
- 2009: "Mujeres En El Club" - Wisin & Yandel featuring 50 Cent
- 2009: "Battle Cry" - Shontelle
- 2009: "Lover" [Official Remix] - De La Ghetto ft. Juelz Santana
- 2009: "All Up 2 You" - Aventura ft. Wisin & Yandel & Akon
- 2009: "Abusadora" - Wisin & Yandel
- 2009: "Remember Me" - T.I. ft. Mary J. Blige
- 2009: "Press It Up" - Sean Paul
- 2009: "Gracias a Tí" [Remix] - Wisin & Yandel ft. Enrique Iglesias
- 2009: "Ni Rosas Ni Juguetes" - Paulina Rubio
- 2009: "Imagínate" - Wisin & Yandel ft. T-Pain
- 2010: "Te Siento" - Wisin & Yandel
- 2010: "Algo De Ti" - Paulina Rubio
- 2010: "Cuando Me Enamoro" - Enrique Iglesias ft. Juan Luis Guerra
- 2010: “No Dejemos Que se Apague” - Wisin & Yandel ft. T-Pain & 50 Cent
- 2010: "Buzzin'" - Mann ft. 50 Cent
- 2011: "Tony Montana" - Future
- 2012: "Follow the Leader" - Wisin & Yandel ft. Jennifer Lopez
- 2012: "Algo Me Gusta de Ti / Something About You" - Wisin & Yandel ft. Chris Brown & T-Pain
- 2012: "Limbo" - Daddy Yankee
- 2012: "Un Chance Más" - Mozart La Para
- 2013: "Baby You" - El Poeta Callejero
- 2013: "Descontrol" - Somaya Reece ft. Lapiz Conciente & Anís
- 2013: "Como Le Gusta a Tu Cuerpo" - Carlos Vives ft. Michel Teló
- 2013: "Live It Up" - Jennifer Lopez ft. Pitbull
- 2013: "La Luz" - Juanes
- 2014: "Adrenalina" - Wisin featuring Ricky Martin and Jennifer Lopez
- 2014: "I Luh Ya Papi" - Jennifer Lopez
- 2014: "La Botella" - Zion & Lennox
- 2015: "Rumba" - Anahí featuring Wisin
- 2015: "Sígueme y Te Sigo" - Daddy Yankee
- 2015: "Nota de Amor" - Wisin & Carlos Vives featuring Daddy Yankee
- 2015: "Que Se Sienta El Deseo" - Wisin featuring Ricky Martin
- 2016: "Culpa al Corazón" - Prince Royce
- 2016: "El Perdedor" - Maluma
- 2016: "Sim ou Não" - Anitta featuring Maluma
- 2016: "Vente Pa' Ca" - Ricky Martin featuring Maluma
- 2016: "Vacaciones" - Wisin
- 2017: "Felices los 4" - Maluma
- 2017: "Escapate Conmigo" - Wisin featuring Ozuna
- 2017: "Como Antes" - Yandel featuring Wisin
- 2017: "Bella y Sensual" - Romeo Santos, Daddy Yankee, & Nicky Jam
- 2017: "Corazón" - Maluma featuring Nego do Borel
- 2018: "X" - Nicky Jam & J Balvin
- 2018: "El Préstamo" - Maluma
- 2018: "Me Lloras" - Gloria Trevi featuring Charly Black
- 2018: "Mala Mia" - Maluma
- 2018: "Jaleo" - Nicky Jam & Steve Aoki
- 2019: "Aullando" - Wisin & Yandel featuring Romeo Santos
- 2019: "Te Robaré" - Nicky Jam & Ozuna
- 2019: "Ni Bien Ni Mal" - Bad Bunny
- 2020: "Hawái" - Maluma
- 2020: "Pa' Ti + Lonely" - Jennifer Lopez & Maluma
- 2020: "Hawái" [Remix] - Maluma & The Weeknd
- 2021: "Qué Rico Fuera" - Ricky Martin & Paloma Mami
- 2021: "Cambia el Paso" - Jennifer Lopez & Rauw Alejandro

== Nominations ==
- Jill Scott, Gettin' In The Way, MTV Video Music Awards, 2001.
- Jill Scott, Gettin' In The Way, M2 Awards Finalist, 2001.
- Jill Scott, Gettin' In The Way, Billboard Music Video Awards, 2001.
- Syleena Johnson, I Am Your Woman, Billboard Music Video Awards, 2001.
- 50 Cent, Candy Shop, MTV Video Music Awards, 2005.
- Wisin y Yandel, Abusadora, MTV Video Music Awards, 2009.

== See also ==
- Lists of people from the Dominican Republic.
