= El Dúo de la Historia Vol. 1 =

Compilation album by Wisin & Yandel
- Released: June 9, 2009
- Recorded: 2009
- Genre: Reggaeton
- Length: 40:29
- Label: Sony International
- Producer: Fresh Productions

Wisin & Yandel chronology
La Revolución (2009)	El Dúo de la Historia Vol. 1 (2009)	Wisin & Yandel Presentan: WY Records: Lo Mejor De La Compañía (2010)

El Dúo de la Historia Vol. 1 (English: The Duo of History, Volume 1) is a compilation album by Wisin & Yandel.

== Track list ==
All songs except for track #11-14 are performed by Wisin & Yandel

No.	Title	Producer(s)	Length
1.	"Intro"		1:11
2.	"La Mata"	Nelly "El Arma Secreta"	3:32
3.	"Me Vuelve Loco" (Remix Of The Song "Dembow")	Nelly "El Arma Secreta"	3:36
4.	"Gata"	Gaby Music	2:17
5.	"Mírala" (feat. Divino & Baby Ranks)	Meka	3:00
6.	"Yo Te Vi"	Nelly "El Arma Secreta"	2:48
7.	"Fua"	Nelly "El Arma Secreta"	3:33
8.	"Hoy Estoy Aquí"	DJ Sonic	3:26
9.	"A Lo Loco" (Reggae Rokeao)	Vladimir Felix (DJ Blass)	1:34
10.	"No Se"	Nelly "El Arma Secreta"	2:28

Fresh Productions Bonus Tracks
No.	Title	Producer(s)	Length
11.	"Entrégate" (Wibal & Alex)	Keko Music & Juan Oregon	3:28
12.	"Dale Mai" (Kaltri)	Yeiko Federal & Juan Orengo	3:17
13.	"Matando La Liga" (Wibal & Alex)	Keko Music & Juan Orengo	2:40
14.	"No Ha Sido Fácil" (Kaltri)	Yeiko Federal & Juan Orengo	3:39
Total length:			40:29

== Charts ==
Chart (2009)	Peak position
US Latin Rhythm Albums (Billboard)	7
US Top Latin Albums (Billboard)	36
