= Te Siento =

Single by Wisin & Yandel

from the album La Revolución: Evolution
- Released: December 15, 2009
- Genre: Hip hop; reggaeton
- Length: 4:19
- Label: WY Records, Machete
- Songwriters: Juan Luis Morena, Llandel Veguilla, Ernesto Padilla
- Producers: Nesty "La Mente Maestra", Victor "El Nasi"

Wisin & Yandel singles chronology
"Imagínate" (2009)	"Te Siento" (2009)	"Loco (Remix)" (2010)

"Te Siento" (English: I Feel You) is a song performed by reggaeton duo Wisin & Yandel. The song is taken from Wisin & Yandel's re-release studio album Evolution. It was released as the third single on December 15, 2009. On November 5, 2009, a part of the song was performed first time on the Latin Grammy Awards 2009 along with "Abusadora", using a short intro-video to perform.

== Music video ==
The duó in the music video.

The music video for the song was filmed in October 2009 on Los Angeles in conjunction with the music video for their previous single "Imagínate".

The director for the video was Jessy Terrero who has filmed most of Wisin & Yandel's music videos. On the music video they sing on a stage with neon lights and girls dancing around them. It was premiered on December 2, 2009.

The video for the remix featuring Franco "El Gorila" was released on February 18, 2010, the plot of the video it's simply the original version with Franco's raps thrown in the video.

== Charts ==
Chart (2009/10)	Peak position
US Hot Latin Songs (Billboard)	16
US Latin Rhythm Songs (Billboard)	9
US Latin Pop Airplay (Billboard)	11
US Tropical Airplay (Billboard)	4
Venezuelan Airplay Chart	17
Venezuelan Latin Airplay Chart	6

=== Year-end charts ===
End of year chart (2010)	Position
US Latin Songs Year End 2010	62
US Latin Tropical Songs Year End 2010	9

== Versions/Remixes ==
- Album version — 4:19
- Remix (featuring Jowell & Randy) — 4:50
- Remix (featuring Franco "El Gorila") — 4:20
