= La Revolución =

Studio album by Wisin & Yandel
- Released: May 26, 2009
- Recorded: September 8, 2008 – March 29, 2009 at La Mente Maestra Studio (Barranquitas, Puerto Rico)
- Genres: Reggaeton, R&B, electropop
- Labels: WY Records, Machete
- Producers: Nesty "La Mente Maestra", Victor "El Nazi", Marioso, Tainy, Luny Tunes

Wisin & Yandel chronology
Wisin & Yandel Presentan: La Mente Maestra (2009)	La Revolución (2009)	El Dúo de la Historia Vol. 1 (2009)

Singles from La Revolución
- 1. "Mujeres in the Club" Released: April 14, 2009; 2. "Abusadora" Released: June 2, 2009; 3. "Gracias a Ti" Released: October 1, 2009

La Revolución: Evolution
- La Revolución: Evolution Mixtape cover

Singles from La Revolución: Evolution
- 1. "Imagínate" Released: November 2, 2009; 2. "Gracias a Ti (Remix)" Released: November 10, 2009; 3. "Te Siento" Released: December 15, 2009

Professional ratings
Review scores
Source	Rating
Allmusic	4/5 stars

La Revolución (English: The Revolution) is the sixth studio album, and the ninth album overall, by Puerto Rican reggaeton duo Wisin & Yandel. It was released on May 26, 2009 by Machete Music and WY Records. The album features collaborations with rapper 50 Cent, Ivy Queen, Yaviah, Ednita Nazario and Yomo. The album became a success in the United States and a bigger hit in Latin America. It won the Latin Music Award for Latin Rhythm Album of the Year at the 2010 Latin Billboard Music Awards. To promote the album the artists embarked on the La Revolución World Tour in the US.

== Background ==
The album is reported to incorporate the more older styles and sounds of Wisin & Yandel's music, tracing back to when they first started to produce music. This was confirmed by Wisin to the EFE Agency in Argentina, he confirmed that "It'll be a return to our origins; It'll have everything."

== Commercial performance ==
In the United States, the first week prediction were between 25-30k. La Revolución debuted at number seven on the Billboard 200 with sales of 35,700, making it the highest debut for a Spanish language recording act since Maná's Amar es Combatir and Shakira's Fijación Oral Vol. 1, both albums debuted and peaked at number four. It was the second best selling latin album of 2009 in the United States selling 204,000 copies. Following the 2009`s Latin Grammy Awards ceremony, where the duo won Best Urban Song, album sales increased by 81% the next week in the United States.

Following the reissue of the album, La Revolucion: Evolucion, the album bounds back from ten to number one at Billboard Latin Albums with 10,000 units sold with a 365% increased.

Worldwide, the album sold 100,000 copies in it first week. The album sold more than three million of copies worldwide.

== Track listing ==
Standard Edition
No.	Title	Writer(s)	Length
1.	"La Revolución"	Victor Martinez, Ernesto Padilla, Llandel Veguilla, Juan Morera	4:10
2.	"Quítame El Dolor"	Martinez, Padilla, Veguilla, Morera	3:19
3.	"Encendío"	Padilla, Veguilla, Morera	3:45
4.	"Mujeres in the Club" (featuring 50 Cent)	Curtis Jackson, Padilla, Veguilla, Morera	4:00
5.	"Ahí Voy"	Marco Masis, Veguilla, Morera	3:58
6.	"Emociones"	Martinez, Padilla, Veguilla, Morera	4:04
7.	"Gracias A Ti"	José Gomez, Veguilla, Morera	3:52
8.	"Perfecto" (featuring Ivy Queen & Yaviah)	Martinez, Padilla, Veguilla, Morera, Martha Pesante, Javier A. Marcano	4:22
9.	"Abusadora"	Masis, Veguilla, Morera	2:57
10.	"Ella Me Llama"	Christian M. Colon, Padilla, Veguilla, Morera	4:14
11.	"Yo Lo Sé"	Martinez, Padilla, Veguilla, Morera	3:45
12.	"¿Cómo Quieres Que Te Olvide?" (featuring Ednita Nazario)	Gomez, Veguilla, Morera	4:32
13.	"Tú Vives En Mí"	Masis, Veguilla, Morera	3:33
14.	"Besos Mojados"	Victor Cabrera, Francisco Saldana, Veguilla, Morera	4:22
15.	"Descará" (Yomo featuring Wisin & Yandel)	Raymond Diaz, José Torres, Veguilla, Morera	5:03
Total length:			1:00:47

iTunes Bonus Track
No.	Title	Length
16.	"Tiene Que Pasar"	4:07
Total length:		1:04:54

Deluxe Edition
No.	Title	Writer(s)	Length
16.	"Me Estás Tentando"	Gomez, Padilla, Veguilla, Morera	3:49
17.	"Me Estás Tentando" (Remix) (featuring Franco "El Gorila", Jayko) (Digital and Deluxe Edition CD without DVD)	Gomez, Padilla, Veguilla, Morera	4:24
18.	"Lloro Por Ti" (Remix) (featuring Enrique Iglesias)	Enrique Iglesias, Descemer Bueno, Veguilla, Morena	4:34
Total length:			1:13:34

Deluxe Edition - iTunes Bonus Track
No.	Title	Length
19.	"Tiene Que Pasar"	4:07
Total length:		1:17:41

Deluxe Edition - DVD
No.	Title	Length
1.	"Me Estás Tentando" (Music Video)	3:52
2.	"Mujeres in the Club" (Music Video) (featuring 50 Cent)	4:52
3.	"Me Estás Tentando" (Remix) (Music Video) (featuring Franco "El Gorila", Jayko)	4:27
4.	"Lloro Por Ti" (Remix) (Music Video) (featuring Enrique Iglesias)	4:30
5.	"Mujeres in the Club" (Behind the Scenes) (featuring 50 Cent)	3:18

=== La Revolución: Evolution ===
La Revolución: Evolution (English: The Revolution: Evolution) is a re-issue edition of the album released on November 23, 2009. It comes with 2 CDs with the first disc containing the 15 tracks from the standard edition and disc 2 containing 8 new tracks. It also featured a DVD with four Music Videos.

Disc 2
No.	Title	Writer(s)	Length
1.	"Sandungueo" (featuring Yomo, Franco "El Gorila", Gadiel)	Cortes, Martinez, Morena, Padilla, Torres, Veguilla	6:37
2.	"Te Siento"	Morena, Padilla, Veguilla	4:18
3.	"Imagínate" (featuring T-Pain)	Martinez, Morena, Padilla, Veguilla, T-Pain	4:44
4.	"All Up 2 You" (Aventura featuring Akon, Wisin & Yandel) (This track isn't available on the Colombian, Ecuadorian, Peruvian, and Venezuelan editions)	Masis, Veguilla, Morena, Anthony "Romeo" Santos, Aliaune Thiam	3:40
5.	"Pasan Los Dias"	Martinez, Morena, Padilla, Veguilla	4:42
6.	"Desapareció" (featuring Tico "El Inmigrante", Gadiel)	Masis, Morena, Mujica, Veguilla	4:27
7.	"Ella Me Llama" (Remix) (featuring Akon)	Thiam, Christian Colon, Morena, Padilla, Veguilla	4:25
8.	"Gracias A Ti" (Remix) (featuring Enrique Iglesias)	Gomez, Veguilla, Morera, Iglesias	4:12
Total length:			01:37:46

DVD (Music Videos)
No.	Title	Length
1.	"Gracias A Ti" (Remix) (featuring Enrique Iglesias)	4:29
2.	"Gracias A Ti"	4:32
3.	"Abusadora"	3:27
4.	"Mujeres in the Club" (featuring 50 Cent)	4:52

== Personnel ==
Adapted from album's liner notes:

- General Producers: Juan Luis Morera "Wisin" / Llandel Veguilla "Yandel"
- Executive Producers: Juan Luis Morera "Wisin" / Llandel Veguilla "Yandel" / Edgar Andino
- Musical Producers: Ernesto F. Padilla "Nesty La Mente Maestra" / Victor Martinez "El Nasi" / Jose Gomez "Profesor Gomez" / Marcos Masis "Tainy" / Christian M. Colon "Vagabundo" / Raymond Diaz "Memo"
- Recording Studio: La Mente Maestra Studio (Barranquitas, Puerto Rico) / Spectrum Studio
- Recording: Victor Martinez "El Nasi"
- Production Coordinator: Ana J. Alvarado
- Mixing: Mario de Jesus "Marioso"
- Mixing Assistant: Luis "Luisito" Lopez, Kiko Hurtado, Yamil Martinez
- Mixing Studio: Mas Audio Production
- Mastering: Sterling Sound
- Creative Direction/Design/Digital Post-Production: Iancarlo "Conqui" Reyes
- Photography: Andres Hernandez
- Stylist: Ed Coriano
- Managing Team: Andino Marketing / Edgar Andino / Paco Lopez

50 Cent appears courtesy of Shady/Aftermath/Interscope Record.
Yomo appears courtesy of Black Pearl International Records, Inc.
Ednita Nazario appears courtesy of Sony Music Entertainment US Latin.
Yaviah appears courtesy of Pina Records.
Ivy Queen appears courtesy of Drama Records.

== Charts and sales ==
=== Weekly charts ===
Chart (2009)	Peak position
Argentina Albums (CAPIF)	14
Ecuadorian Albums (Musicalisimo)	3
Méxican Albums (AMPROFON)	1
US Billboard 200	7
US Top Latin Albums (Billboard)	1
US Top Rap Albums (Billboard)	3
Venezuelan Albums (Recordland)	4

=== Year-end charts ===
Chart (2009)	Position
US Billboard 200	199
US Top Latin Albums (Billboard)	2
Chart (2010)	Position
US Top Latin Albums (Billboard)	5

=== Sales and certifications ===
Region	Certification	Certified units/sales
Argentina (CAPIF)	Gold	20,000^{^}
Colombia	Platinum	
Ecuador	Gold	
Guatemala	Gold	
Mexico (AMPROFON)	Platinum	80,000^{^}
Peru	Gold	
Venezuela	Gold	
^{^} Shipments figures based on certification alone.

== Accolades ==
Year	Recipient	Award	Result	Ref.
2009	La Revolución	Latin Grammy Awards – Best Urban Music Album	Nominated	
2009	«Abusadora»	Latin Grammy Awards – Best Urban Song	Won	
2009	«Mujeres In The Club»	Latin Grammy Awards – Best Urban Song	Nominated	
2009	«Abusadora»	MTV Video Music Awards – Best Pop Video	Nominated	
2009	«Abusadora»	Premios MTV Latinoamérica – Video of the Year	Won	
2010	La Revolución	Grammy Awards – Best Latin Rock, Alternative or Urban Album	Nominated	
2010	La Revolución	Latin Billboard Music Awards – Latin Album of the Year	Nominated	
2010	«Gracias A Ti»	Latin Billboard Music Awards – Hot Latin Song of the Year, Vocal Event	Nominated	
2010	«Abusadora»	Latin Billboard Music Awards – Tropical Airplay Song of the Year	Nominated	
2011	La Revolución: Evolution	Lo Nuestro Awards – Urban Album of the Year	Won	
2011	«Te Siento»	Lo Nuestro Awards – Urban Song of the Year	Won	

== See also ==
- List of number-one Billboard Latin Rhythm Albums of 2010
