= Wisin & Yandel Presentan: La Mente Maestra =

Compilation album by DJ Nesty and Wisin & Yandel
- Released: November 11, 2008
- Recorded: 2007–2008 at La Mente Maestra Studio (Barranquitas, Puerto Rico)
- Genre: Reggaeton, R&B, electropop
- Length: 47:17
- Label: WY Records, Machete; 001227802
- Producer: Nesty "La Mente Maestra"(exec.), Wisin & Yandel (exec.), Victor "El Nasi", Gomez, Marioso

DJ Nesty and Wisin & Yandel chronology
Wisin vs. Yandel: Los Extraterrestres (2007)	Wisin & Yandel Presentan: La Mente Maestra (2008)	La Revolución (2009)

Singles from Wisin & Yandel Presentan: La Mente Maestra
- 1. "Me Estás Tentando" Released: October 21, 2008; 2. "Desnudemonos" / "Sex" Released: January 15, 2009; 3. "Cositas Macabras" Released: October 21, 2009

Professional ratings
Review scores
Source	Rating
AllMusic	3/5 stars

Wisin & Yandel Presentan: La Mente Maestra (Wisin & Yandel Present: The Master Mind) is the third compilation album by WY Records and is Nesty "La Mente Maestra"'s first album. It is presented by Wisin & Yandel and was released on November 11, 2008 by WY Records and Machete Music.

The album features production of famous reggaeton producers Nesty "La Mente Maestra" and Victor "El Nasi", as well as an introduction to some underground-successful reggaeton artists Jayko, Gadiel, Franco "El Gorila", and Tico "El Inmigrante". Also features contributions by Tony Dize and Alexis & Fido.

The first single, "Me Estás Tentando", was released on October 21, 2008. The single debuted on the Billboard Hot Latin Songs chart at #50, and has so far peaked at #14. It also charted on the Billboard Latin Rhythm Airplay chart at #4. La Mente Maestra won the Lo Nuestro Award for Urban Album of the Year.

== Track listing ==
No.	Title	Performer(s)	Length
1.	"Meten Presión (Intro)"	Wisin & Yandel, Franco "El Gorila", Jayko, Gadiel	4:08
2.	"Me Estás Tentando"	Wisin & Yandel	3:49
3.	"Sex"	Jayko	3:19
4.	"Ella Quiere"	Franco "El Gorila"	2:30
5.	"No Te Vayas"	Tony Dize	4:07
6.	"Superhéroes"	Alexis & Fido	3:27
7.	"Desnudémonos"	Jayko	3:38
8.	"Vamos A Hacerlo"	Yandel Ft. Franco "El Gorila"	2:49
9.	"Cositas Macabras"	Gadiel	2:44
10.	"Déjame Hablar"	Wisin & Yandel	3:26
11.	"Necesito Tu Calor"	Gadiel Ft. Tico "El Inmigrante"	3:12
12.	"Más Me Pide"	Jayko	3:12
13.	"Solos Tu Y Yo"	Wisin & Yandel	3:33
14.	"Hablan Mal De Mi"	Yandel	3:23
Total length:			47:17

== Credits and personnel ==
- Ernesto F. Padilla (Nesty "La Mente Maestra") – General/Executive/Musical Producer
- Juan Luis Morera (Wisin) – Co-Executive Producer
- Llandel Veguilla (Yandel) – Co-Executive Producer
- Victor Martinez (Victor "El Nasi") – Co-Musical Producer, Recording
- Jose Gomez (El Profesor Gomez) – Co-Musical Producer
- Ana J. Alvarado – Production Coordinator
- Mario de Jesus (Marioso) – Mixer
- Iancarlo "Conqui" Reyes – Creative Director, Design, Digital Post-Production
- Edwin David – Photography
- Ed Coriano – Stylist
- Alesi – Accessories

== Charts ==
Chart (2008)	Peak position
Argentina Album Charts	5
Mexico Album Charts	1
U.S. Billboard 200	65
U.S. Billboard Top Latin Albums	1
U.S. Billboard Top Rap Albums	6
U.S. Billboard Comprehensive Albums	69
U.S. Billboard Latin Rhythm Albums	1
Venezuelan Albums (Recordland)	3

== Sales and certifications ==
Region	Certification	Certified units/sales
Mexico (AMPROFON)	Platinum	80,000^{^}
United States (RIAA)	Platinum (Latin)	100,000^{^}
^{^} Shipments figures based on certification alone.
