= Follow the Leader (Wisin & Yandel song) =

Single by Wisin & Yandel and Jennifer Lopez

from the album Líderes
- Released: April 10, 2012
- Studio: New Era Destination Studios (Fajardo, PR)
- Genre: Latin pop, dance-pop
- Length: 4:00
- Label: WY, Machete
- Songwriters: Jennifer Lopez; Juan Luis Morera; Llandel Veguilla; Jonas Saeed; Niclas Kings; Candace Thorbourne; Tasha Thorbourne; Nailah Thorbourne; Nyanda Thorbourne
- Producers: Jonas Saeed and Niclas Kings for Cave Music

Wisin & Yandel singles chronology
"Tu Olor" (2011)	"Follow the Leader" (2012)	"Algo Me Gusta de Ti" (2012)

Jennifer Lopez singles chronology
"Dance Again" (2012)	"Follow the Leader" (2012)	"Goin' In" (2012)

Music video
- "Follow the Leader" on YouTube

"Follow the Leader" is a song by Puerto Rican duo Wisin & Yandel and American singer Jennifer Lopez. They performed the song during the American Idol season eleven finale. The song went on to sell over 500,000 copies in pure sales in the United States earning a gold certification.

== Background and composition ==
On January 24, 2012, Lopez teased a collaboration between her and Wisin and Yandel by posting a picture online. "Follow the Leader" contains South American rhythms. "'Wisin sings in the style of Yandel and Yandel in that of Wisin', referring to the more powerful tone of the former and the lighter vocal touch of the latter." The song was produced by Jonas Saeed and Niclas Kings for Cave Music, a Swedish company of producers, and written by the Jamaican writing team Bloodline (Nyanda, Nailah, Tasha and Candace Thorbourne).

== Music video ==
The music video for "Follow the Leader" was shot in Acapulco, Mexico by director Jessy Terrero and Lopez's partner Casper Smart. For the first shot, Lopez wore a pair of tight latex leggings with a silver and black long-sleeved shirt with tornado sirens blaring in the background. The singer paired the look with metallic makeup, nude lips and a "funky" hairstyle, which included cornrows. For the second shoot in Mexico, Lopez wore a sparkly silver vest and tight white jeans. During the shooting of the video, the Government of Acapulco gave additional police cars, ambulance and helicopter services to the team working with the duo and López, with the goal to promote the city among "all the young people who will watch the clip".

The Tourism secretary, Graciela Báez Ricardez, commented that the clip "will help reshape the image of the port city". She also said that "the music video will be watched in many countries, millions of times mainly by young people who will soon choose their vacation destination". The video premiered on Thursday May 3 on both Twitter and official VEVO channel of Wisin & Yandel. Jordan Zakarin from The Hollywood Reporter described the video's plot:

"Set in Mexico, the video features Lopez dancing on a rooftop with the reggaeton stars, shaking her hips and writhing with alluring fervor and seductive purpose; traipsing through the city while being chased by her friends (and crashing through windows and making massive jumps all the while); and bare-skinned, with the word "lidere," [sic] Spanish for leader, tattooed to her chest and a giant ink spot on her back."

Sarah Anne Hughes of The Washington Post noted the product placement in the video, including a Dodge truck and BlackBerry phones. It was further nominated for Video of the Year at the Premio Lo Nuestro 2013.

The music video for the song as of 2019 has garnered 528 million views and when translated into streaming sales equivalents, it generated an additional 77,000 single sales equivalents.

== Charts ==
=== Weekly charts ===
Chart (2012)	Peak position
Austria (Ö3 Austria Top 40)	74
Belgium (Ultratop 50 Flanders)	36
Belgium (Ultratip Bubbling Under Wallonia)	22
Colombia (National-Report)	7
Colombia Pop Anlgo Airplay (National Report)	3
France (SNEP)	177
Honduras (Honduras Top 50)	9
Mexico (Billboard)	19
Mexico Español (Billboard)	9
Slovakia Airplay (ČNS IFPI)	45
Spain (Promusicae)	26
US Bubbling Under Hot 100 (Billboard)	5
US Radio Songs (Billboard)	70
US Hot Latin Songs (Billboard)	1
US Latin Pop Airplay (Billboard)	3
US Tropical Airplay (Billboard)	2
US Latin Rhythm Airplay (Billboard)	1

=== Year-end charts ===
Chart (2012)	Position
US Hot Latin Songs (Billboard)	17

== Certifications ==
Region	Certification	Certified units/sales
Brazil (Pro-Música Brasil)	Gold	30,000^{‡}
United States (RIAA)	Gold	500,000^{*}
^{*} Sales figures based on certification alone.^{‡} Sales+streaming figures based on certification alone.

== Release history ==
Country	Date	Format	Label
United States	April 10, 2012	Digital download	Machete Music
Mexico	April 10, 2012	Digital download	Machete Music

== See also ==
- List of Billboard number-one Latin songs of 2012
