= Tu Olor =

Single by Wisin & Yandel

from the album Los Vaqueros: El Regreso
- Released: June 14, 2011
- Genre: Reggaeton
- Length: 4:05 (Album version)
- Label: Machete; WY Records
- Songwriter(s): F. Padilla; Victor Martínez
- Producer(s): Nesty "La Mente Maestra", Victor "El Nasi"

Wisin & Yandel singles chronology
"Frío" (2011)	"Tu Olor" (2011)	"Follow the Leader" (2012)

"Tu Olor" (English: "Your Scent") is the second single by Wisin & Yandel's album Los Vaqueros: El Regreso. A music video was filmed and released. It received an award for "Urban Song of the Year" at the 2012, ASCAP Awards, which are awarded annually by the American Society of Composers, Authors and Publishers in the United States.

== Music video ==
The music video is set in Cartagena de Indias, Colombia as shown in intro credits. Video starts with a woman swimming into a pool and then it shows Wisin & Yandel in a bullring. Video then centers around a car chase. Directed by Simon Brand and Produced by Mauricio Osorio and Manes Carrasco.

== Charts ==
=== Weekly charts ===
Chart (2011)	Peak position
US Bubbling Under Hot 100 (Billboard)	25
US Hot Latin Songs (Billboard)	1
US Latin Pop Airplay (Billboard)	12
US Tropical Airplay (Billboard)	1

=== Year-end charts ===
Chart (2011)	Position
US Hot Latin Songs (Billboard)	41
