= Gracias a Ti =

Single by Wisin & Yandel featuring Enrique Iglesias

from the album La Revolución: Evolution
- Released: November 10, 2009
- Genre: R&B; Latin pop
- Length: 3:52 (album version); 4:12 (Remix featuring Enrique Iglesias)
- Label: WY; Machete
- Songwriters: Juan Luis Morena; Llandel Veguilla; "El Profesor" Gómez
- Producers: Nesty "La Mente Maestra"; Victor "El Nasi"; "El Profesor" Gómez

Wisin & Yandel singles chronology
"All Up 2 You" (2009)	"Gracias a Ti" (2009)	"Imagínate" (2009)

Enrique Iglesias singles chronology
"Takin' Back My Love" (2009)	"Gracias a Ti Remix" (2009)	"Cuando Me Enamoro" (2010)

"Gracias a Ti" (English: Thanks to You) is a song by Puerto Rican reggaeton duo Wisin & Yandel from their album, La Revolución (2009). The track was released as the third single from the album. A remixed version, featuring pop singer spain Enrique Iglesias was released on November 10, 2009.

== Background ==
The song is written by Wisin & Yandel and produced by Nesty "La Mente Maestra", Victor "El Nasi" and "El Profesor" Gómez. The album version was released originally on October 1, 2009. Back on August, the remix version with additional vocals by Enrique Iglesias was recorded in Buenos Aires, Argentina, and released as the single version included on the re-release of La Revolución titled La Revolución: Evolution.

== Music video ==
The duó & Iglesias on the video.

The music video used for the album version premiered on October 5, 2009. The video includes footage from their live performances on a concert in Luna Park in Buenos Aires.

In September, a music video for the remix version with Iglesias was filmed at the same place, which was released on November 2, 2009. It was the same concept from the video of the album version, only including footage from Iglesias on the performance. Both videos were directed by long-time Wisin & Yandel's collaborator Jessy Terrero and co-directed by Luis Carmona.

== Charts ==
Chart (2009)	Peak position
Honduras (EFE)	1
US Hot Latin Songs (Billboard)	1
US Latin Rhythm Songs (Billboard)	5
US Tropical Airplay (Billboard)	1
US Billboard Heatseekers Songs	13
US Bubbling Under Hot 100	16
Venezuelan Airplay Chart	12

== See also ==
- List of number-one Billboard Hot Latin Songs of 2009
- List of number-one Billboard Hot Tropical Songs of 2009
- List of Billboard Latin Rhythm Airplay number ones of 2009
