= Abusadora =

Single by Wisin & Yandel

from the album La Revolución
- Released: June 2, 2009
- Genre: Reggaeton
- Length: 2:57
- Label: WY Records, Machete
- Songwriters: Juan Luis Morera, Llandel Veguilla, Marco Masis
- Producer: Tainy

Wisin & Yandel singles chronology
"Mujeres In The Club" (2009)	"Abusadora" (2009)	"All Up 2 You" (2009)

"Abusadora" (English: Abusive Woman) is the second single by Puerto Rican reggaeton duo Wisin & Yandel from their album La Revolución. The music video has been airplay on Mun2 and MTV Tr3s. At the 10th Annual Latin Grammy Awards, the song won the award for Best Urban Song. It received a nomination a Latin Rhythm Airplay Song of the Year at the 2010 Latin Billboard Music Awards. This is the fourth song recorded in Spanish to be nominated for an MTV Video Music Award behind Shakira's "La Tortura" (2005) and Daddy Yankee's "Gasolina" and "Rompe" (2005 and 2006, respectively).

== Music video ==
Wisin & Yandel in the music video for "Abusadora".

=== Development ===
The music video was filmed in Death Valley, California and directed by Jessy Terrero. It was premiered on June 2, 2009.

=== Synopsis ===
In the video Wisin & Yandel are driving buggies in the desert sand. "Abusadora" was nominated for a 2009 MTV Video Music Awards in the category of "Best Pop Video". The video became the first Spanish video to be nominated in this category. To date the video has received over 111 million views on the popular website YouTube.

== Chart performance ==
"Abusadora" became the duo's 5th number 1 hit on the Hot Latin Songs chart, the song was also entered on the Bubbling Under Hot 100 Singles from the Billboard chart at number 14.

== Charts ==
=== Weekly charts ===
Chart (2009)	Peak position
Colombia (EFE)	6
Spain (Promusicae)	34
Peru Airplay (UNIMPRO)	14
Mexican Airplay (EFE)	7
US Bubbling Under Hot 100 (Billboard)	14
US Hot Latin Songs (Billboard)	1
US Latin Rhythm Airplay (Billboard)	1
US Tropical Airplay (Billboard)	1
Venezuela (Record Report)	6

=== Year-end charts ===
Chart (2009)	Position
US Hot Latin Songs (Billboard)	25

== Certifications ==
Region	Certification	Certified units/sales
Spain (Promusicae)	Gold	50,000^{‡}
^{‡} Sales+streaming figures based on certification alone.

== See also ==
- List of Billboard Latin Rhythm Airplay number ones of 2009
