= Me Estás Tentando =

Single by Wisin & Yandel

from the album Wisin & Yandel Presentan: La Mente Maestra and La Revolución: Evolution
- Released: October 21, 2008
- Recorded: March 13, 2008
- Genre: EDM, Reggaeton
- Length: 3:49 (original version); 4:23 (remix version)
- Label: WY; Machete
- Songwriters: Juan Luis Morera; Llandel Veguilla; Jose Gomez; Ernesto Padilla
- Producers: Nesty "La Mente Maestra"; Victor "El Nasi"; Marioso

Wisin & Yandel singles chronology
"Dime Qué Te Pasó" (2008)	"Me Estás Tentando" (2008)	"Mujeres in the Club" (2009)

Alternative cover
- Remix version single

"Me Estás Tentando" (English: "You're Tempting Me") is the first single by Puerto Rican reggaeton duo Wisin & Yandel from Nesty la Mente Maestra's compilation album Wisin & Yandel Presentan: La Mente Maestra, released on October 21, 2008 by Machete Music. A remix of the single was released on February 17, 2009. It features Franco "El Gorila" and Jayko, and a music video was also released in early February. The song was also featured in the 2009 video game Grand Theft Auto: Episodes from Liberty City on the San Juan Sounds radio station.

== Charts ==
=== Weekly charts ===
Chart (2008–2009)	Peak position
Honduras (EFE)	7
US Bubbling Under Hot 100 (Billboard)	13
US Hot Latin Songs (Billboard)	1
US Latin Pop Airplay (Billboard)	25
US Latin Rhythm Airplay (Billboard)	1
US Tropical Airplay (Billboard)	1

=== Year-end charts ===
Chart (2009)	Position
US Hot Latin Songs (Billboard)	14

== See also ==
- List of number-one Billboard Hot Tropical Songs of 2009
- List of Billboard Latin Rhythm Airplay number ones of 2009
