= Mujeres in the Club =

Single by Wisin & Yandel featuring 50 Cent

from the album La Revolución
- Released: April 14, 2009
- Genre: Reggaeton; hip-hop
- Length: 4:00
- Label: WY; Machete
- Songwriters: J.L. Morera; L. Veguilla; E.F. Padilla; C. Jackson
- Producers: Nesty "La Mente Maestra"; Victor "El Nasi"; Marioso

Wisin & Yandel singles chronology
"Me Estás Tentando" (2008)	"Mujeres in the Club" (2009)	"Abusadora" (2009)

50 Cent singles chronology
"Crack a Bottle" (2009)	"Mujeres in the Club" (2009)	"Baby by Me" (2009)

"Mujeres in the Club" (English: "Women in the Club") is the first single by Puerto Rican reggaeton duo Wisin & Yandel from their album La Revolución, released on April 14, 2009 by UMG and features rapper 50 Cent. Yandel uses the Auto-Tune effect in his vocals. The song is nominated for Best Urban Song at the Latin Grammy Awards of 2009.

== Music video ==
The music video for "Mujeres in the Club" was filmed in March 2009 in Brooklyn, New York and was directed by Jessy Terrero, Wisin & Yandel's long-time working music video director. It was released by Universal Music Group on April 17, 2009 on YouTube and premiered on MTV Tr3s on April 14, 2009. The video is set in 2050 when the world has destroyed itself and features 50 Cent and a cameo by Julissa Bermudez. To date the video has received over 4,900,000 views through its posting by UMG.

The music video on YouTube has received over 65 million views as of April 2024.

== Track listing ==
Digital single

No.	Title	Writer(s)	Producer(s)	Length
1.	"Mujeres in the Club" (featuring 50 Cent)	J.L. Morera; L. Veguilla; E.F. Padilla; C. Jackson	Nesty "La Mente Maestra"; Victor "El Nasi"; Marioso	4:02
