= 2010 Billboard Latin Music Awards =

Annual American music awards ceremony

- Date: April 29, 2010
- Venue: José Miguel Agrelot Coliseum, San Juan, Puerto Rico

The Billboard Latin Music Awards recognize the most popular Latin music on the charts, featuring top solo performers and Latin groups in such categories as pop, rock, tropical, Mexican Regional music and Reggaeton.

New award categories in 2010 include Latin Artist of the Year and New Latin Artist of the Year. Leading the pack for most nominations this year was Tito El Bambino with a total of 18 nods followed by Wisin & Yandel with 14 nominations and Aventura with 12. Other Latin stars with multiple nods included Shakira, Paulina Rubio, Nelly Furtado, Luis Fonsi, and Banda el Recodo.

In 2010, nominees were announced on February 14 — followed by the 17th annual Billboard Latin Music Awards official broadcast, televised on Telemundo in on April 29, 2010 live from Coliseo de Puerto Rico, José Miguel Agrelot in San Juan, Puerto Rico — marking the first time ever that the awards show has taken place outside the continental US and its traditional home in Miami.

== Awards ==
The winners are in Bold

=== Artist of the Year ===
- Aventura (Premium Latin)

=== Artist of the Year, New ===
- Larry Hernandez (Fonovisa)

=== Hot Latin Song of the Year ===
- Tito "El Bambino" – El Amor (Siente)

=== Hot Latin Song of the Year, Vocal Event ===
- Alejandro Sanz feat. Alicia Keys – Looking for Paradise (Warner Latina)

=== Hot Latin Songs Artist of the Year, Male ===
- Tito "El Bambino"

=== Hot Latin Songs Artist of the Year, Female ===
- Shakira (Epic/Sony Music Latin)

=== Hot Latin Songs Artist of the Year, Duo or Group ===
- Aventura (Premium Latin)

=== Hot Latin Songs Label of the Year ===
- Universal Music Latino

=== Crossover Artist of the Year ===
- The Black Eyed Peas (Interscope)

=== Crossover Artist of the Year, Solo ===
- Lady GaGa (Streamline/KonLive/Cherrytree/Interscope))

=== Latin Album of the Year ===
- Aventura – The Last (Premium Latin)

=== Top Latin Albums Artist of the Year, Male ===
- Vicente Fernandez (Sony Music Latin)

=== Top Latin Albums Artist of the Year, Female ===
- Marisela (IM)

=== Top Latin Albums Artist of the Year, Duo or Group ===
- Aventura (Premium Latin)

=== Top Latin Albums Label of the Year ===
- Universal Music Latin Entertainment

=== Latin Pop Airplay Song of the Year ===
- Luis Fonsi – Aqui Estoy Yo (Universal Music Latino)

=== Latin Pop Airplay Artist of the Year, Male ===
- Luis Fonsi (Universal Music Latino)

=== Latin Pop Airplay Artist of the Year, Female ===
- Paulina Rubio (Universal Music Latino)

=== Latin Pop Airplay Artist of the Year, Duo or Group ===
- Aventura (Premium Latin)

=== Latin Pop Airplay Label of the Year ===
- Universal Music Latino

=== Latin Pop Album of the Year ===
- Marisela – 20 Exitos Inmortales (IM)

=== Latin Pop Albums Artist of the Year, Solo ===
- Luis Fonsi (Universal Music Latino)

=== Latin Pop Albums Artist of the Year, Duo or Group ===
- La Quinta Estacion (Sony Music Latin)

=== Latin Pop Albums Label of the Year ===
- Universal Music Latin Entertainment

=== Tropical Airplay Song of the Year ===
- Luis Enrique – Yo No Se Mañana (Top Stop)

=== Tropical Airplay Artist of the Year, Male ===
- Tito "El Bambino" (Siente)

=== Tropical Airplay Artist of the Year, Female ===
- Shakira (Epic/Sony Music Latin)

=== Tropical Airplay Artist of the Year, Duo or Group ===
- Aventura (Premium Latin)

=== Tropical Airplay Label of the Year ===
- Sony Music Latin

=== Tropical Album of the Year ===
- Aventura – The Last (Premium Latin)

=== Tropical Albums Artist of the Year, Solo ===
- Luis Enrique (Top Stop)

=== Tropical Albums Artist of the Year, Duo or Group ===
- Aventura (Premium Latin)

=== Tropical Albums Label of the Year ===
- Sony Music Latin

=== Regional Mexican Airplay Artist of the Year, Male ===
- Espinoza Paz (Disa/ASL)

=== Regional Mexican Airplay Artist of the Year, Female ===
- Jenni Rivera (Fonovisa)

=== Regional Mexican Airplay Artist of the Year, Duo or Group ===
- La Arrolladora Banda El Limon (Disa)

=== Regional Mexican Airplay Label of the Year ===
- Disa

=== Regional Mexican Album of the Year ===
- El Trono De Mexico – Almas Gemelas (Fonovisa)

=== Regional Mexican Albums Artist of the Year, Solo ===
- Vicente Fernandez (Sony Music Latin)

=== Regional Mexican Albums Artist of the Year, Duo or Group ===
- El Trono De Mexico (Fonovisa)

=== Regional Mexican Albums Label of the Year ===
- Universal Music Latin Entertainment

=== Latin Rhythm Airplay Song of the Year ===
- Tito "El Bambino" – El Amor (Siente)

=== Latin Rhythm Airplay Artist of the Year, Solo ===
- Tito "El Bambino"

=== Latin Rhythm Airplay Artist of the Year, Duo or Group ===
- Wisin & Yandel (WY/Machete Music/Universal Music Latino)

=== Latin Rhythm Airplay Label of the Year ===
- Machete

=== Latin Rhythm Album of the Year ===
- Wisin & Yandel – "La Revolucion" (WY/Machete Music)

=== Latin Rhythm Albums Artist of the Year, Solo ===
- Tito "El Bambino" (Siente/Universal Music Latino)

=== Latin Rhythm Albums Artist of the Year, Duo or Group ===
- Wisin & Yandel (WY/Machete Music)

=== Latin Rhythm Albums Label of the Year ===
- Universal Music Latin Entertainment

=== Latin Touring Artist of the Year ===
- Ricardo Arjona (Warner Latina)

=== Latin Digital Album of the Year ===
- Aventura – The Last (Premium Latin)

=== Latin Master Ringtone of the Year ===
- Banda El Recodo – Te Presumo (Fonovisa)

=== Latin Digital Download of the Year ===
- Tito "El Bambino" – El Amor (Siente)

=== Songwriter of the Year ===
- Isidro Chavez “Espinoza Paz” Espinoza

=== Publisher of the Year ===
- Arpa Musical, LLC, BMI

=== Publishing Corporation of the Year ===
- Sony/ATV Music

=== Producer of the Year ===
- Armando Avila

=== Spirit Of Hope ===
- Marc Anthony

=== Billboard Lifetime achievement award ===
- Los Temerarios
