= Nesty la Mente Maestra =

Puerto Rican record producer

- Also known as: DJ Nesty; La Mente Maestra
- Born: Ernesto Fidel Padilla Colón; September 5, 1973 (age 53); Aibonito, Puerto Rico
- Genres: Reggaeton
- Occupations: Songwriter; musician; producer
- Years active: 2002–present
- Labels: WY; Machete; Y; Warner Latina

Ernesto Fidel Padilla Colón (born September 5, 1973), known professionally as Nesty la Mente Maestra, is a Puerto Rican reggaeton record producer. He was closely associated with reggaeton duo Wisin & Yandel and reggaeton producer Víctor el Nasi.

== Music career ==
Nesty began his recording career as an associate of reggaeton hitmakers Luny Tunes during the early to mid-2000s. Known simply as Nesty, he made a name for himself apart from Luny Tunes with a pair of hit singles in 2005: "Chulin Culin Chunfly" (Julio Voltio ft. Calle 13) and "Eso Ehh...!!" (Alexis & Fido).

In 2006, Nesty produced tracks for high-profile albums by Don Omar (King of Kings) and Tego Calderón (The Underdog/El Subestimado), including the hit single "Los Maté" by the latter. Around this same time, Nesty began a close association with Wisin & Yandel, producing much of their album Los Vaqueros, including the hit singles "Pegao," "Yo Te Quiero," and "Nadie Como Tú." In subsequent years he remained closely associated with Wisin & Yandel, producing the bulk of their album Wisin vs. Yandel: Los Extraterrestres, including the chart-topping hit single "Sexy Movimiento," and Wisin & Yandel Presentan: La Mente Maestra in which he was co-billed on the front cover of the latter album. On May 19 Nesty produced the re-edition of the album Los Vaqueros: El Regreso, named Reloaded.

In 2011 Nesty produced (Alexis & Fido) "Contestame El Teléfono" and "Donde Estés Llegaré"

Begin 2012, a few artists signed with WY Records decided to leave the record label. Among them were Franco "El Gorila", Tico "El Inmigrante" and Jayko. On January 19, it was announced that top-producer Nesty had also said goodbye to WY Records. He decided it was time to go separate ways and is about to start his own company. Rumoured albums like Tainy vs. Nesty and Nesty vs. Victor were hereby negated.

In 2015 Nesty produced several tracks for Alexis & Fido in La Esencia "Santa de mi Devocion" and the Grammy Award-winning album and a nomination for BEST URBAN SONG "Dando Break".

2016 Nesty produced Alexis & Fido "Una en Un Millon", which was a Latin Grammy Award nominee.

In 2021, he worked with Yandel in a new single.

== Discography ==
2008

- Wisin & Yandel Presentan: La Mente Maestra; Compilation album by DJ Nesty and Wisin & Yandel

== Production discography ==
2005

- The Pitbulls; Studio album by Alexis & Fido
- Voltio; Studio album by Julio Voltio
- Vida Escante: Special Edition; Studio album by Nicky Jam

2006

- Top of the Line;Studio album by Tito El Bambino
- King of Kings; Studio album by Don Omar
- Los Vaqueros; Compilation album by Wisin & Yandel

2007

- Masterpiece Commemorative Edition; compilation album by R.K.M & Ken-Y
- Los Vaqueros Wild Wild Mixes; Remix album by Wisin & Yandel
- Wisin vs. Yandel: Los Extraterrestres; Studio album by Wisin & Yandel

2008

- La Melodía De La Calle; Studio album by Tony Dize
- Los Extraterrestres: Otra Dimension; Studio album by Wisin & Yandel

2009

- Welcome to the Jungle; Studio album by Franco "El Gorila"
- La Revolución; Studio album by Wisin & Yandel

2010

- El Momento;Studio album by Jowell & Randy

2011

- Los Vaqueros 2: El Regreso; Studio album by Wisin & Yandel

2013

- Free Music; Studio album by Tempo

2014

- Legacy; EP by Yandel

2015

- El Que Sabe, Sabe; by Tego Calderón Latin Grammy Winner
- La Esencia; Studio album by Alexis y Fido

2018

- La Resurrección; Studio album by Yomo (up coming) Coming soon
