= Machete Music =

Urban music label owned by Universal Music Group

- Parent company: Universal Music Group
- Distributor: Universal Music Group
- Genre: Reggaeton; urban
- Country of origin: Puerto Rico

Machete Music is an urban music label owned by Universal Music Group. The label was once largely associated with reggaeton music, but later also signed non-reggaeton artists such as Malverde, Mala Rodriguez and Chino XL. The label is part of Universal Music Latin Entertainment. Machete Music is one of the most prevalent labels in the reggaeton genre.

According to Toy Selectah (also known as Toy Hernández, A&R of the label from 2004 to 2007), its president Gustavo López "suggested the name Machete, in part because of Control Machete, Hernández's former band". In 2010, the label launched its Machete Music Tour 2010 in celebration of the label's fifth anniversary. The label claims 80% of Latin Rhythm Billboard chart sales. In the five years between the label's establishment in 2005 and 2010, Machete had 27 top ten albums on the Billboard Top Latin Albums chart, eleven of which were number one albums.

== Artists signed with Machete Music ==
- AKWID
- Angel & Khriz
- Artwell Smart
- Black Guayaba
- Carlos & Alejandra
- Chino & Nacho
- DJ Kazzanova
- Don Omar
- Eddy Lover
- El Roockie
- Ivy Queen
- J-King & Maximan
- Jory
- Jowell & Randy
- Mach & Daddy
- Makano
- Ñejo & Dalmata
- Poeta Callejero
- Xtreme
- Cazzu
- Mariah Angeliq

== Affiliated labels ==
- Drama Records
- Gold Star Music
- Mas Flow Inc
- Panama Music
- Pina Records
- VI Music
- WY Records

== Former artists on Machete Music ==
- La Factoría
- Wisin & Yandel

== See also ==
- Universal Music Group
- Universal Music Latin Entertainment
- Reggaeton
- List of reggaeton musicians
- Lists of record labels
