= Amor Prohibido =

1994 studio album by Selena

Studio album by Selena
- Released: March 22, 1994
- Recorded: September 1993–February 1994
- Studios: AMEN (San Antonio, Texas)
- Genres: Tejano; Mexican cumbia; dance-pop; pop rock
- Length: 35:27
- Language: Spanish
- Label: EMI Latin
- Producer: A.B. Quintanilla

Selena chronology
Mis Mejores Canciones – 17 Super Éxitos (1993)	Amor Prohibido (1994)	12 Super Exitos (1994)

Singles from Amor Prohibido
- 1. "Amor Prohibido" Released: April 13, 1994; 2. "Bidi Bidi Bom Bom" Released: July 31, 1994; 3. "No Me Queda Más" Released: October 1994; 4. "Fotos y Recuerdos" Released: January 1995

Amor Prohibido (English: Forbidden Love) is the fourth studio album by American singer Selena, (Note: Amor Prohibido is the final studio release by Selena, however, her Dreaming of You studio album was released after her death in July 1995.) released on March 22, 1994, by EMI Latin. Having reached a core fan base, the label aimed to broaden her appeal with the next studio release. Finding it challenging to write a follow-up hit after "Como la Flor" (1992), Selena's brother A. B. Quintanilla enlisted the assistance from band members Ricky Vela and Pete Astudillo with writing the album's songs. The resulting album has a more mature sound featuring experimental production that blends diverse musical styles from ranchera to hip-hop music. Amor Prohibido is a Tejano cumbia album modernized with a synthesizer-rich delivery using a minimalist style that was quintessential in early 1990s Tejano music.

The album's songs deal with dysfunctional and volatile relationships; its lyrics explore unrequited love, infidelity, and social division. With relatively few love songs, Amor Prohibido narrates a woman's struggles and triumphs following unsuccessful relationships with men who struggle with commitment. The album continued the singer's streak of number-one singles on the United States Billboard Hot Latin Songs chart with the title track "Amor Prohibido"— which became the most successful US Latin single of 1994, a feat she repeated the following year with "No Me Queda Más". Along with the latter, "Bidi Bidi Bom Bom" and "Fotos y Recuerdos" also topped the US Latin chart, and together with "Si Una Vez" are regarded as Selena's signature recordings.

When the album tour broke attendance records at the Houston Astrodome and attracted a record-breaking crowd at Miami's Calle Ocho Festival, Selena became recognized as one of the biggest US Latin touring acts at that time. Amor Prohibido became the first Tejano record to peak at number one on the Billboard Top Latin Albums chart, remaining in the top five for 98 consecutive weeks. The album holds the record for most weeks at number one on Billboard's Regional Mexican Albums chart at 97 nonconsecutive weeks, as well as crowning the chart in four different calendar years. Amor Prohibido received critical acclaim: it is considered to be Selena's best work and her band's "crowning achievement". The album's sound received the highest acclaim, it was noted by critics to have retained its innovative spirit well into the 21st century. Amor Prohibido is credited with catapulting Tejano music into mainstream success resulting in sales to listeners previously unfamiliar with the genre. Amor Prohibido was nominated for Best Mexican-American Album at the 37th Grammy Awards. The record took Album of the Year honors at the 1995 TMA's and the Lo Nuestro Award for Best Regional Mexican Album.

On March 31, 1995, Selena was murdered by her friend and former manager of her Selena Etc. boutiques, Yolanda Saldívar. The record re-entered the Billboard 200 chart, peaking at number 29 and was certified gold by the Recording Industry Association of America (RIAA). Within three weeks, it was certified platinum and was re-certified by the RIAA as 41× platinum (Latin), denoting 2.46 million album-equivalent units sold. Amor Prohibido is the second-highest certified Latin album in the United States trailing only her posthumous album Dreaming of You (1995), the fourth best-selling Latin album in the US, the best-selling Tejano recording of the 1990s, and remains the best-selling Tejano recording of all time. Amor Prohibido has been ranked among the most essential Latin recordings of the past 50 years by Billboard magazine, while Rolling Stone magazine named it one of The 500 Greatest Albums of All Time. NPR ranked the album number 19 on their list of the 150 greatest albums made by women; it was the highest-ranking album by a female Latin artist and ninth highest-ranking recording by a woman of color.

On February 11, 2026 Amor Prohibido was officially inducted into the Recording Academy’s Grammy Hall of Fame.

== Production and development ==
=== Background ===
Following the release of Selena's third studio album Entre a Mi Mundo and the launch of a clothing boutique in 1993, the singer and her band began working on Amor Prohibido. Having achieved the success and fan base that EMI Latin's president Jose Behar was seeking, Behar aimed to capitalize on Selena's broad appeal with the next studio release. The label was keen to use a Grammy Award-winning producer instead of the singer's brother, A.B. Quintanilla. A.B. knew Selena's musical tastes and vocal range, though he found that he needed to outdo himself to remain her principal record producer. He found it challenging to meet expectations after the commercial success of Entre a Mi Mundo and its career-launching single "Como la Flor". When A.B. met with record executives in New York City and Nashville, they pressured him to come up with another successful song. He felt it was important that the music he produced for Selena remain fresh. He stressed that writing a successful song following "Como la Flor" was infeasible—as he expressed to Billboard, "you don't try to outdo a hit, you just write another hit". As with previous albums, A.B. enlisted Selena y Los Dinos band members, Pete Astudillo and Ricky Vela, to help with the writing process. The result included a mature sound for Selena with experimental recording and production than her previous works. It was the final album featuring production and songwriting by Astudillo, who subsequently parted with Los Dinos to pursue a solo career.

=== Recording ===
"[A.B] left the studio trusting me to put together a solo that would work [for "Bidi Bidi Bom Bom"]. I remember thinking, "this song is going to be huge" because I felt it the way A.B. did. "Bidi Bidi Bom Bom" was a woman's proud celebration of love. I wanted to create a radical guitar solo that would truly blend a hard rock sound into a Tejano cumbia, in much the same way Selena and I had grown up in traditional families to become a contemporary couple. I wanted, more than anything, to support the rich, optimistic sound of Selena's singing with my guitar. The song worked on every level, and before long, "Bidi Bidi Bom Bom" took on a life of its own, becoming one of Selena's most beloved, most enduring hits."

— Chris Pérez, To Selena, with Love

Amor Prohibido was recorded at Manny Guerra's studio in San Antonio, Texas, and was engineered by Brian "Red" Moore. The production of Amor Prohibido lasted six months beginning on September 17, 1993. (Note: According to A.B. the entire production of Amor Prohibido took six months to complete before it was released in March 1994, which translates to September 1993. According to Chris Pérez, the band performed the original English version of "Bidi Bidi Bom Bom" at their Nuevo Leon concert that September 1993. He explicitly said that he did not remember the exact date for which the band began production of Amor Prohibido. Though he expressed that the day after their Nuevo Leon concert, the band began production of Amor Prohibido with the finishing touches to "Bidi Bidi Bom Bom" into a Spanish-language Tejano cumbia song. Biographer Joe Nick Patoski wrote that the date of the Nuevo Leon concert was September 16, 1993.) The recording schedule was squeezed in around touring commitments and the opening of Selena's boutiques, as Selena's husband and guitarist Chris Pérez recalled: "I don't even know how we managed to find time to make the next album." According to Vela, progress stalled and the band had to rush to finish production because of an approaching deadline. The first day of recording, which lasted until four in the morning, began with the sequencing of the keyboards. The following days concluded with the band recording their respective parts before Selena recorded her vocals. It then took two weeks to complete post-production. Vela said that it was common for the band to rehearse all of the music in advance of the recording sessions, as the band's production sequence remained unchanged for Amor Prohibido. Selena and the band recorded their parts in the studio after they had first perfected them during pre-production. A.B. would then arrange and mix them, using an AKAI MPC60 II for timing and tempo control before studio mixing instruments were used. It took two weeks for Selena to record the album's ten tracks.

Pérez provided an evocative account of working with Selena during the sessions for Amor Prohibido. Pérez wrote how Selena never complained in the studio, adding that the singer was never recalcitrant towards changes. Selena would often arrive at the studio during the album's production, "hum her part a little", and then proceeded to the mall informing the band not to worry because she would "know what to do when [the band is] ready to record." Nevertheless, Pérez explained that the band never had to approach Selena on changes in the studio as she disciplined herself and tracked her vocals while requesting a second take in order to "add little harmonies she'd create" during recording. A.B. described his own creative process during the sessions in a 1994 interview with KMOL. He would use a tape recorder to hum a melody before creating a title and concept of a song. If he caught himself humming a tune the next day "then it's catchy", otherwise he "wouldn't use it." A.B. also requested material from Rena Dearman, former keyboardist of the group, who provided several songs. A.B. favored "I'll Be Alright" and wanted Selena to record the song for Amor Prohibido. After it was rejected by EMI Latin because it was incoherent of the album's theme, A.B. suggested that it could be included in Selena's next Tejano recording.

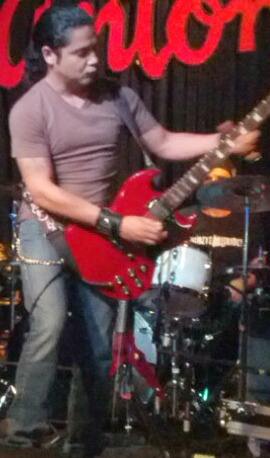
Chris Pérez (pictured in 2012) took creative control on "Ya No"; adding electric guitar riffs and other musical styles into the recording.

One song–"Bidi Bidi Bom Bom"–was improvised during a rehearsal starting off as a song with few, if any, lyrics. The band's drummer, Selena's sister Suzette Quintanilla, said "we were goofing off" and insisted that after A.B. began playing a groove on his guitar, Selena started singing, coming up with lyrics "as ideas came to her." It started off with lyrics about a cheerful fish swimming freely in the ocean, which Astudillo likened to a nursery rhyme, organized around a wah-wah guitar riff using a crybaby that was improvised by Pérez. The track, then called "Itty Bitty Bubbles", became an extended jam during the band's concerts to prevent promoters from reducing their pay for playing for a shorter time than promised. Selena performed the song at the La Feria concert in Nuevo Leon in September 1993, a day before the singer and Astudillo began "[putting] the lyrics and melody together". A.B. saw potential in the tune and "nipped and tucked what Selena [had already done]". He joined as co-writer, writing the guitar solos for Pérez, as well as the arrangements for the song. A.B. called it "kinda a little scary" finding the project the first of its kind. The day before the band was scheduled to record the album, A.B. approached Pérez and asked if he would be interested in working with Vela on "Ya No", a song that A.B. had written. Pérez worked with Vela throughout the night improvising the drum sounds and programming the music for it, adding electric guitar riffs, and complementing it with his own musical style. Pérez was dumbfounded that despite A.B.'s assistance he had been given creative control over the track.

The idea for the album's title track was Selena's own, although Astudillo had at one time aspired to write a telenovela-esque song entitled "Amor Prohibido". Together with A.B. and Astudillo, Selena began writing and recording a track based on a story about her great-grandparents. The singer was inspired by love letters written by her great-grandmother who wrote about her experiences as a maid to the Calderon family, a wealthy family who lived in Nueva Rosita, Mexico who immigrated from Spain, and her infatuation with their son. Her great-grandmother was forbidden to form a relationship with him because of her social class and described it as "forbidden love". Astudillo feared that Selena's father would reject the song because of the lyrical content of disobeying one's parents to pursue true love, as Selena herself had done when eloping with Pérez in 1992. Abraham heard "Amor Prohibido" after Selena recorded the track and enjoyed it, he found the lyrics to be relatable something "many families have gone through". While recording the song, Selena had ad-libbed "oh whoa, baby". Her brother believed that the recording would not have been the same had she not added the "oh whoa, baby" part. "Amor Prohibido" sampled the cencerro, which was intended by A.B., to attract people of different ethnicities to Selena's music. The media attention following Selena's death led the Calderon family to Selena and the song "Amor Prohibido", they visited the family for the first time and traveled to Corpus Christi. After falling in love with Suzette, and finding out about her marriage in September 1993, Vela wrote down how he felt; which he had kept private from her. The resulting song was titled "No Me Queda Más" and it was given to Selena to record for the album. According to Abraham, Selena provided an emotional delivery while recording the track and was seen sobbing in the recording studio because "she knew how [Vela] felt" about Suzette.

During recording sessions for "Techno Cumbia", A.B. encouraged Selena to rap with a New York accent similar to Rosie Perez. During a New York trip, A.B. heard the Pretenders' 1983 single "Back on the Chain Gang" on the radio. Concerned about the lack of material the band had to record for the album, and captivated by the idea of reworking "Back on the Chain Gang" into a Spanish-language cumbia song, A.B. asked Vela to write a translation of the lyrics. After discovering that Selena had sampled her song, Pretenders' vocalist Chrissie Hynde prevented the band from releasing Amor Prohibido and demanded a translation from Vela before she approved a rights agreement. At the time of Hynde's refusal, the band had $475,000 (1994 USD) of pre-sale copies in a warehouse that included "Fotos y Recuerdos". Noticing it was the shortest track on Amor Prohibido, musicologist James Perone felt that "Fotos y Recuerdos" had "stripped some of the edge [sic] off of Hynde's text but retained the basic premise of ["Back on the Chain Gang"]". Perone complemented A.B.'s arrangement as "an example of [his] universal Latin approach."

== Composition ==
"Amor Prohibido"
15-second sample of "Amor Prohibido" in which the lyrics of forbidden love between two people of different social classes can be heard; critics found its lyrics to be ambiguous and the LGBT community interpreted them to be about prohibited love between same-sex couples.

Amor Prohibido contains a more diverse collection of musical styles than Selena's previous work, ranging from ranchera to hip-hop music. Music critics believe it is an album of various genres accessible to both traditional and contemporary Latin music fans. Jeff Young, then-EMI Latin's sales director, labeled Amor Prohibido as "Pop International", which Mark Schone of Newsday believed was a ploy by the company to broaden Selena's appeal. Musicologist Matt Doeden found the album as having "a new sound" whose aim was to appeal to a broad audience. Perone found the mixture of compositions on the album to be rock and dance music, and according to Frank Hoffman in the Encyclopedia of Recorded Sound, the album exhibited the band's broad range of styles. Newsweek found the music in Amor Prohibido to have combined house music, cumbia, rock, dancehall, and new wave that was modernized in a kaleidoscopic form that embodied postmodern maelstrom of the mid-'90s. Amor Prohibido diverged from Selena's "stock-in-trade contemporary Tex-Mex sound." Mario Tarradell of The Dallas Morning News, however, believed the title track and "Bidi Bidi Bom Bom" contained Selena's cheerful and enthusiastic personality that were prevalent in previous recordings. The album's musical influences include salsa, funk, R&B, bubblegum pop, teen pop, pop ballads, techno, a fusion of reggae and dancehall, rock, polka, conjunto, flamenco, mariachi, corridos, and Tejano cumbia. Tejano cumbia is used heavily throughout Amor Prohibido. Author Ed Morales noticed its representation of the "cumbia sound" already established by Tejano band La Mafia, though Donald Clarke found Selena's delivery to be more of a modernized synthesizer-rich sound. While Amor Prohibido is a cross-cultural musical fusion, it remains an authentic Tejano recording, which uses a minimalist style that was quintessential in early 1990s Tejano music.

Selena called the recordings on Amor Prohibido as "love songs [or songs about] getting your heartbroken". Lyrically, the title track "Amor Prohibido" encapsulates the social divide between a poverty-stricken woman and the man of unreachable rank with whom she has fallen in love. The lyrics have been analyzed by authors, musicologists, and critics, who found them relevant to issues facing the LGBT community. They are ambiguous, and have been interpreted to portray prohibited romance between same-sex couples, modern society's views of romantic relationships, and to Romeo & Juliet. A review in The Monitor felt that the lyrics portrayed the forbidden love that Selena and Pérez hid from her overbearing father. Musically, the titular song is "an emotional uptempo ballad" which showcases the singer's "passionate side". In "Cobarde", the protagonist calls her partner a "coward" upon learning on his inability to face her after feeling reticent about his affair. Two other tracks, "Ya No" and "Si Una Vez", delve into heartaches of failed relationships with the protagonist in the former song angrily refusing to take back a cheating partner. Selena's vocals were called "strong [and] raspy" in "Si Una Vez". Suzette particularly liked because Selena gave "that attitude" in the song.

"Tus Desprecios" has a storyline typical of mariachi recordings, concerning dysfunctional and volatile relationships. The track uses the traditional Tejano conjunto (small band) style and includes a trilling accordion motif. On the day Selena recorded the song, she was suffering from a bronchitis episode. Perone wrote that the song showed Selena's ease with pop, Latin, and Tejano styles. Writing for The Miami Herald, Mario Tarradell described "Tus Desprecios" and "Si Una Vez" as having a more traditional Tejano sound than the rest of the tracks on Amor Prohibido but found them riddled with synthesizers and digital processing. Another track, "No Me Queda Más", uses the identical style of ranchera songs, with the female singer agonizing over the end of a relationship. The lyrics explore an unrequited love in which a woman wishes the best for her former lover despite her own agony. Jose Feliciano express his take on the song, noting a sense of sorrowfulness in the lyrics, while finding cognitive parallels to Selena's life, and noticed a comparison of compositions that are typically recorded by Pedro Infante. Selena's voice was admired for being powerful and emotive, while her vocals were found to have been subdued and solemn and were sung in a desperate and emotional way. Hispanic magazine praised Selena's vocal interpretations in "No Me Queda Más", citing the singer's ability to tackle such a song reserved for established musicians twice her age.

"Bidi Bidi Bom Bom"
"Bidi Bidi Bom Bom" draws on music from the Caribbean, features lusher arrangements and less driven, trebly synthesizers than the first four songs on Amor Prohibido. It has since become one of her most recognizable recordings.

Joe Nick Patoski of The New York Times, recognized the melody of "Fotos y Recuerdos" from the Pretenders' new wave sound, that played on a rock en español groove surrounded with organs and percussions which "transcend[ed] traditional Tejano sounds." He also noticed that Pérez's lead guitar emulated the style of the Pretenders' James Honeyman-Scott. Newsweek praised Pérez' guitar solos and the lyrics on "Fotos y Recuerdos" which explored forbidden romance, with the singer "cherishing memories of a relationship". John LaFollette of The Monitor called Selena's simultaneous appeals to multiculturalism and commerce in the song "as American as apple pie." The track supplements rock and house rhythms with synth-driven strings and layers of percussion, including steel drums under a cumbia beat. Perone located suggestions of Jamaica, Cuba, and Trinidad and Tobago. "Techno Cumbia" featured Selena rapping under a cumbia beat supplemented with congas, hi-hats, techno samples, and EBM. Patoski acclaimed the band's new take on the cumbia rhythm, updated vocal samples, drums inspired from New Orleans, and horn charts taken from soca from the Caribbean. "Techno Cumbia" was praised as the first successful case of a cumbia-rap prototype in the industry. "Bidi Bidi Bom Bom", which also draws on music from the Caribbean, features lusher arrangements and less driven, trebly synthesizers than the first four songs on Amor Prohibido. Infused with cumbia and reggae, its onomatopoeic title and its nonsensical lyrics suggests the sound of Selena's heart palpitating whenever she thought of her husband. (Note: Authors Prampolini and Pinazzi (2013) and Patoski (2020) wrote their interpretation of "Bidi Bidi Bom Bom" as the sound of a heart palpitating when a person longs to be the protagonist's object of affection. They called the title "onomatopoeic" and its lyrics as "nonsensical". However, in a Sabado Gigante interview, Selena said that the palipations were of her own whenever she thought of her husband Chris Pérez.) Critics praised the song's catchiness and noted a sense of conviviality in the track. "Bidi Bidi Bom Bom" is musically similar to "El Chico del Apartamento 512"; Perone noted a recurring theme of attraction to a young man. The latter song's hook is more accessible to listeners with limited Spanish than that of "Bidi Bidi Bom Bom". In "El Chico del Apartamento 512", called a "sunny pop anthem", the protagonist is hit on by several men whom she has no interest in, except for the song's "boy in apartment 512". She finds enough courage to knock on his door to find it answered by a woman who asks if she is searching for her brother. To Perone, the song's lightness represents a relief from the heartbreak and despair elsewhere on the album.

== Release and promotion ==
Amor Prohibido was released in the United States on March 22, 1994. (Note: According to music-authoritative AllMusic, Amor Prohibido was released on March 13, 1994, though Ramiro Burr of the San Antonio Express-News wrote that the album was released on March 14, 1994, however, this contradicts the re-released liner notes in 2002 where the album was said to have been released on March 27, 1994. Newspapers at the time of its release, place the street date in April 1994, with the earliest promotional ad running for the album was in The Galveston Daily News on April 15, 1994.) The release followed a recording contract with EMI Latin's pop division SBK Records, who aimed Selena to crossover into mainstream American pop music, in November 1993. After this news reached Billboard magazine, Amor Prohibido was given a spotlight feature in its album reviews which called its release a continuation of her "torrid streak." While Mark Holston of Hispanic magazine, wrote that the album's release reinforced her reputation as one of the leading Hispanic singers of the 1990s. With EMI Latin's president Jose Behar requesting enhancements to their commercial appeal, the band gave Argentine arranger Bebu Silvetti the song "No Me Queda Más" to be reworked into a pop-style track for its single release in October 1994. Amor Prohibido was subsequently re-released with a red sticker indicating that it included a "new version" of the song. In a Billboard interview, Behar said that "No Me Queda Más" was "internalized" without affecting the originality of its recording. During the twenty-year celebration of Selena releasing music, Amor Prohibido was repackaged and was made available for physical and digital purchase on September 22, 2002. The limited-edition version included Selena's duet with the Barrio Boyzz on their 1994 single "Donde Quiera Que Estés", music videos for "Amor Prohibido" and "No Me Queda Más", as well as spoken liner notes containing commentary and recollections of each track provided by the singer's family, friends, and her band.

After featuring on "Donde Quiera Que Estés", Selena went on a mini-tour with the Barrio Boyzz that enabled her to visit New York City, Argentina, Puerto Rico, the Dominican Republic, and Central America, where she was not well known. In September 1994, Selena sold out the 10,000 seats D.C. Armory in Washington, DC, with mostly Central Americans in attendance. Daniel Bueno, who organized the event, told The Washington Post that Central Americans loathe Tejano music and thought that the addition of reggae and tropical music into her repertoire had helped her appeal to Central Americans. Nelly Carrion, a journalist for the Washington Hispanic, expressed how the audience resonated emotionally towards Selena's performance and stressed how people were desperate to touch Selena, forcing her act to be suspended. Selena made several appearances on television and in live shows to promote Amor Prohibido. Most notably, her performance at the Houston Astrodome on February 26, 1995, has been called one of her best. The event was critically praised for breaking attendance records set by country music musicians Vince Gill, Reba McEntire, and George Strait. Her performance in the Astrodome was emulated by Jennifer Lopez in her role as the singer in the 1997 biopic. The singer appeared at the Calle Ocho Festival in Miami, with an estimated 100,000 in attendance breaking previous audience records. Her performance on a November 1994 episode of Sabado Gigante was ranked among the most memorable moments in the show's 53-year history. Selena performed "Bidi Bidi Bom Bom", "No Me Queda Más", "El Chico del Apartamento 512", and "Si Una Vez" on the Johnny Canales Show, which was later released as part of the host's "favorite songs" on DVD. Selena's performance of "Bidi Bidi Bom Bom" on July 31, 1994, at Six Flags AstroWorld was the subject of a video released by the Houston Chronicle for their segment "On This Forgotten Day". Ramiro Burr, of Billboard, called the singer's tour for her album a "tour de force". The concerts established Selena as one of Latin music's most successful contemporary acts.

=== Singles ===
Tracks released from the album continued the singer's streak of US number-one singles. The title track, "Amor Prohibido", was the album's lead single released on April 13, 1994. The song peaked at number one on the Billboard Hot Latin Songs chart the week ending June 11 – her first number one as a solo artist – and remained atop the chart for nine consecutive weeks becoming the most successful US Latin single of 1994. "Amor Prohibido" was certified 7× platinum by the Recording Industry Association of America (RIAA) denoting sales of 420,000 digital units. "Bidi Bidi Bom Bom" followed in July, reaching the top of the chart in its eleventh week on October 29, it remained at number one for four consecutive weeks, and was certified 9× platinum by the RIAA for sales of 540,000 digital copies. "No Me Queda Más" was released in November peaking at number one for seven nonconsecutive weeks. The single fared better in 1995, remaining entrenched in the top ten on the Hot Latin Songs chart for twelve consecutive weeks, earning it the title of Billboard's most successful US Latin single that year. The track was certified quadruple platinum by the RIAA for digital sales of 240,000 units. The album's final single "Fotos y Recuerdos", released in January 1995, peaked at number one following the shooting death of Selena on March 31, 1995. At the time of her death, the song was at number four. "Fotos y Recuerdos" peaked and remained atop the Hot Latin Songs chart for seven weeks, finishing the year as the second most played track in the US trailing "No Me Queda Más". The song was certified platinum by the RIAA for digital sales of 60,000 copies. Although not released as singles from Amor Prohibido, "Techno Cumbia" was certified platinum by the RIAA for sales of 60,000 digital units, "El Chico del Apartamento 512" was certified double platinum for selling 120,000 copies, while "Si Una Vez" received a triple-platinum certification for 180,000 copies sold.

Mario Tarradell of The Dallas Morning News wrote that the singles from Amor Prohibido elevated Selena to success on Latin radio whose promoters had not previously taken the singer seriously. "Bidi Bidi Bom Bom" was ranked number 54 on the Dallas Observer's list of the Best Texas Songs of All-time. The song was listed as an honorable mention on Billboard's top ten list of best Tejano songs of all-time, while "No Me Queda Más" ranked ninth. Lisa Leal of KVTV said that "No Me Queda Más" and "Bidi Bidi Bom Bom", continue to be popular with fans and are Spanish-language counterparts of the Beatles' 1965 single, "Yesterday", in fan popularity. Author Kristine Burns also considered that the two aforementioned singles aided the growth of Selena's fan base. "Bidi Bidi Bom Bom" was the most-played song from Amor Prohibido on Mexican radio, and remains a Latin pop and American pop standard. "Fotos y Recuerdos" has been recognized as the singer's "best-known dance tracks", while "Amor Prohibido" was popular on radios across Spanish-speaking countries. "Techno Cumbia", considered a stable in the 1990s for family gatherings in South Texas, is believed by musicologists to have spearheaded a new style of music. (Note: According to San Antonio Express-News and Billboard Latin music correspondent, Ramiro Burr found Selena to have "established one of the early templates for pop-cumbia-rap fusions". Ed Morales found "Techno Cumbia" to have marked Selena's "work with a different accent". Matt Doeden found the song to be a "new style" of music altogether, while Herón Márquez wrote that it "signaled a new style of Tejano music.") Following the 16th anniversary of the album's release, a readers poll in The Monitor saw participants choosing "No Me Queda Más" and "Fotos y Recuerdos" as their top picks, saying they "loved the feeling and musicianship in those two songs." Three tracks on Amor Prohibido ranked among Billboard's Greatest Hot Latin Songs of All-Time list in 2016, including "No Me Queda Más" at number 13, "Fotos y Recuerdos" at number 29, and "Amor Prohibido" at number 46. The majority of the recordings found on Amor Prohibido have been named Selena's signature songs including the title track, "Bidi Bidi Bom Bom", "Fotos y Recuerdos", and "Si Una Vez".

== Critical reception ==
=== Reviews ===
Professional ratings
Review scores
Source	Rating
AllMusic	5/5 stars
Entertainment Weekly	B
The Monitor	A
Pitchfork	9.1/10
San Antonio Express-News	A
Spin	5/10 stars

The vast majority of contemporary reviews were positive. Critics at The New York Times overwhelmingly praised the album: Peter Watrous felt it stayed honest to her "country, working-class constituency" and Greg Kot praised its "contemporary snap", while Joe Nick Patoski hailed Amor Prohibido as a "watershed" recording from a supergroup at the top of its game. Others, such as AllMusic's Stephen Thomas Erlewine, musicologist James Perone, and music editor Mario Tarradell panned the album initially before coming to view Amor Prohibido positively. Tarradell called Selena "Miss Mexican Lite" and criticized the lack of songs true to regional Mexican music, before calling the album "delightfully infectious". Perone felt the album sounded dated, despite providing ample evidence of the singer's appeal, whereas Erlewine characterized Amor Prohibido as "slightly uneven" and praised Selena's success at recording the weaker material. Erlewine would later describe Amor Prohibido as Selena's strongest album, and an effective introduction to her work that highlighted her successful interpretation of the Tejano sound. Walter Martinez from Latin Style opined that Amor Prohibido contained tracks that deviated from regional Mexican or Tejano music. In response to Martinez's observation, Selena explained that she and the band experimented with Amor Prohibido, but songs like "Cobarde" still encompassed elements of Tejano and norteño music. Selena attributed her success to the diverse genres that she and the band explored in their albums while maintaining a "Mexicano" essence. With Amor Prohibido, Selena noted that the album possessed a pop ambiance, influenced by her exposure to both English and Spanish music during her formative years. She concurred that the album is not strictly "hard-core Tex-Mex or Mexican", which she perceived as a key factor in her and her band's success, as their distinctive sound strayed from tradition.

The album's sound received positive reviews. Described by author Ed Morales as a "subtle evolution", and by The Dallas Morning News as "delightfully infectious, hummable [and] ultra radio-friendly", the tracks were summarized and praised by The Monitor as "romantic, charming and ebullient." Billboard characterized the album's sound to be transparent for those unfamiliar with its musical diversity, while the Houston Chronicle marveled Amor Prohibido's ability at retaining its innovative sound well into the 21st century; a sound which was "light years ahead" of the singer's contemporaries. The singer's "seductive alto" was described as at a peak of expression. The San Antonio Express-News collectively praised the band as being at their "creative peak", while A.B.'s production was highlighted by the Rolling Stone who labeled it the "Selena sound" that would have made the singer a dominant force on the music charts had it not been for her death. Amor Prohibido hinted of a "pop potential", an opinion echoed by author Matt Doeden, who felt that the recording exhibited Selena's potential to become the genre's first pop musician.

Many critics found Amor Prohibido to have been Selena's best work, calling it her band's "crowning achievement." Other reviews called the work the singer's "blockbuster album", her signature album, a "career-defining" release, her "most interesting" and "sleekest" record, a "desert island album" for fans, calling it a "notch up" in her career, a "landmark", a "victory" recording, a "sultry, regional anthem." and an "overnight sensation".

=== Recognition ===
At the time of its release, Amor Prohibido was regarded as very popular in Hispanic communities, albeit one that exemplified a generational split within the Tejano market at the time. Musicians found contemporary Tejano more sophisticated and noticed that it was unnecessary to explore their roots to have successful recordings. A.B.'s musical production of fusing and blending urban musical compositions in Amor Prohibido, revolutionized Tejano music. With Amor Prohibido, Selena brought Tejano music to unprecedented levels of mainstream success. The album was considered one of the first Latin recordings that were enjoyed in the United States during the 1990s Latin explosion, a period known as the golden age of Latin music which was fueled by the singer's death in 1995. Amor Prohibido popularized Tejano music among a younger and wider audience than at any other time in the genre's history. The album was instrumental in popularizing Tejano music and has been credited for "[putting] Tejano music on the map." Amor Prohibido was called the first record many young Hispanic females bought "with lyrics in the language [their] blood is rooted in." With Amor Prohibido, Selena provided a voice and exhibited the experiences of Latinos in the United States. At the time of its release, the album was aimed to surpass limitations in the music industry, ultimately becoming "an ageless cultural symbol".

After the album's release, Selena was considered "bigger than Tejano itself", and was credited for tearing down barriers in the Latin music market. Amor Prohibido established Selena as a figure in American pop music. Critics felt the recording elevated Selena among the leading females in the Latin music sector and established her as a leading performer among young singers with mainstream appeal. Mario Tarradell of The Dallas Morning News believed Selena had "conquered the Latin pop landscape", while Herón Márquez called it a "landmark success". In a November 1994 Billboard issue, Amor Prohibido was named, among other Latin recordings, as an example to show that American Latinos were able to sell albums in English-speaking markets across the US that had historically overlooked Latin music. According to Gisela Orozco of the Chicago Tribune, Selena became the most successful Tejano musician following the album's release. Amor Prohibido was played in its entirety at the 25th anniversary of the D.C. Latino Festival in July 1995, which followed her death in March of that year.

The album appeared on Tom Moon's list of the 1,000 Recordings to Hear Before You Die: A Listener's Life List (2008). The Seattle Post-Intelligencer included Amor Prohibido on its list of the best-produced albums of 1994, while the Houston Press placed it on its list of the best Texas albums of the past 30 years. Amor Prohibido was ranked ninth out of ten on Latin music critic Mario Tarradell's list of the best Latin music albums of the 1990s. BuzzFeed ranked Amor Prohibido number 22 on its list of the "35 Old-School Latino Albums You Probably Forgot About". Billboard magazine ranked Amor Prohibido among the most essential Latin recordings of the past 50 years, and included it on its list of the top 100 albums of all-time. In 2017, NPR ranked Amor Prohibido at number 19 on their list of the 150 greatest albums made by women, the highest-ranking album by a female Latin artist, and ninth highest-ranking recording by a woman of color. Music and media outlets, BuzzFeed, Billboard, and Apple Music, commemorated the album's 25th anniversary in March 2019. Other media outlets, such as Entertainment Tonight and the Houston Chrionicle, interviewed Jennifer Lopez, Ally Brooke, Cierra Ramirez, Natti Natasha, Anitta, Farina, Angela Aguilar, Becky G, and Kam Franklin on their take of Amor Prohibido and the singer's impact on their careers. In an interview with Billboard, Mexican singer Danna Paola spoke about how Amor Prohibido was the first album she ever bought. American soul singer Kam Franklin called the record as "one of the greatest albums of all time". In the updated edition of Rolling Stone magazine's The 500 Greatest Albums of All Time, the album ranked at number 479. In 2024, a group of various music journalists from all over Latin America made a consensus where they ranked the album in position 18 on their list Los 600 de Latinoamérica considered as part of "The 600 essential albums for the history of Latin America."

=== Accolades ===
Selena dominated the 1995 Tejano Music Awards, winning every category in which she was eligible. Amor Prohibido won the Tejano Music Award for Album of the Year – Orchestra, while the title track won Record of the Year and Single of the Year. "Bidi Bidi Bom Bom" was Song of the Year, while "Techno Cumbia" received the award for Best Crossover Song. Amor Prohibido received a nomination for Best Mexican-American Album at the 37th Annual Grammy Awards. Music critic Chuck Philips, believed Selena was "the politically correct candidate" to win the Grammy, "with all the heavy media coverage she [had] received in the last two years [1992-94]". At the Premio Lo Nuestro 1995, the album won Best Regional Mexican Album and its titular single won Regional Mexican Song of the Year. At the second annual Billboard Latin Music Awards in 1995, it won Regional Mexican Album of the Year, Female and its namesake song won Regional Mexican Song of the Year while "No Me Queda Más" received the award for Music Video of the Year. Amor Prohibido was nominated for Album of the Year at the 1995 Desi Entertainment Awards, while the title track was nominated for Spanish-language Song of the Year. At the 1995 Pura Vida Hispanic Music Awards, music industry professionals voted for that year's Best Album for which they awarded to Amor Prohibido along with "Bidi Bidi Bom Bom" which took Music Video of the Year and Song of the Year honors.

== Commercial performance ==
=== Chart history ===
Amor Prohibido debuted at number three on the US Billboard Top Latin Albums chart the week ending April 9, 1994. The following week it rose to number two and received the greatest jump in sales for that week. In an interview with Billboard, A.B. was frustrated that the album had not yet reached number one. He explained that they were limited in their capabilities with Tejano music and spoke about his excitement when Amor Prohibido finally topped the chart, saying the event "was a big thing [for us]." Amor Prohibido peaked at number one in its tenth week, becoming the second album to place first on the newly formed Top Latin Albums chart displacing Cuban singer Gloria Estefan's Mi Tierra from the top spot. Sales were so vigorous it nearly entered the US Billboard 200 and became the first Tejano record to peak at number one on the Top Latin Albums chart. The event marked Selena as the "hottest artist in the Latino market." The following week, the album entered the Billboard 200 chart at number 183, becoming the first record by a non-crossover act to do so since Mexican singer Luis Miguel's album Aries (1993). The album also became the first recording by a Tejano singer to chart on the Billboard 200. Mario Tarradell of The Dallas Morning News called the event "groundbreaking" and named Amor Prohibido as one of the most popular Latin recordings of 1994. Amor Prohibido and Mi Tierra switched back and forth between the first and second positions on the Top Latin Albums chart for five consecutive weeks.

On July 16, the album debuted at number 18 on the US Billboard Heatseekers Albums chart and ranked number one in the South Central United States region. By May 1994, Amor Prohibido had outsold other competing Tejano albums and lead the list of best-selling Tejano records of 1994. Amor Prohibido became the singer's third consecutive album to outsell men in the Tejano market who historically were unchallenged by women. By June 1994, Amor Prohibido outsold ZZ Top and Willie Nelson's recent releases in the state of Texas. Within 19 weeks of its release, the album outsold her previous recordings. It was selling 2,000 units a week in Mexico, while Selena was growing a following in Canada following the release of Amor Prohibido. By November 1994 a report by Billboard showed the singer was one of the top-selling acts in Mexico. Amor Prohibido finished 1994 as the fourth best-selling US Latin album and the best-selling regional Mexican album. After 48 weeks at number one on the US Billboard Regional Mexican Albums chart, Amor Prohibido was displaced by Bronco's Rompiendo Barreras. The recording became the second Tejano album to reach year-end sales of 500,000 copies, a feat that previously had only been accomplished by La Mafia. Despite this, Nielsen Soundscan reported that the recording actually sold 184,000 units by April 1995. (Note: Nielsen Soundscan previously reported that Amor Prohibido sold 200,000 units in the United States in November 1994.) According to Behar, sales figures Nielsen Soundscan provides do not include sales in small shops specializing in Latin music. Before Selena was murdered in March 1995, the album remained in the top five on the Top Latin Albums chart for 53 consecutive weeks. Album sales in the four weeks preceding her death were slightly above 2,000 units a week. In the week immediately before her death, Amor Prohibido sold 1,700 units. In Mexico, Amor Prohibido sold 400,000 units by April 1995, and subsequently received a gold certification.

=== Posthumous commercial performance ===
Media attention had helped increased sales of Amor Prohibido as well as her back catalogue. As a result, EMI Latin increased the production of the singer's albums at their Los Angeles, California, and Greensboro, North Carolina plants. In the hours immediately after her death, it was the most requested album by people in music stores looking for her work. An Austin, Texas music retailer expressed how Amor Prohibido sold more units in the first month following her death "than it did the entire year it was out." This was echoed by a music wholesaler in Manhattan, who constantly sold out of Selena's albums the same day they received them, telling the local newspaper that "It used to be just the Mexicans [in Manhattan]. Now everybody likes her." In McAllen, Texas, music shops reported that people bought the singer's earlier works than Amor Prohibido, citing that "most fans already have her latest [album]". Music stores in Washington, DC, reportedly sold out of Amor Prohibido within days of her murder. The album reached number one for the fifth time on April 15, 1995, with sales of 12,040 units - a 580% increase over the previous week. The record subsequently re-entered the Billboard 200 chart at number 92 and at number one on the Regional Mexican Albums chart. The album sold an additional 28,238 units (a 136% increase) and rose to number 36 on the Billboard 200 chart. Amor Prohibido peaked at number 29 during its fifth week on the Billboard 200. The event was "a rare feat" for a non-English album in the United States. The album jumped from number 20 to number six on the list of the best-selling albums in Southern California in the week following her death. The recording eventually ranked second on their list of the best-selling albums in the state. In a June 1995 report, Amor Prohibido was the second best-selling record in Puerto Rico. Amor Prohibido and her 1992 studio album Entre a Mi Mundo, rose 1,250% in sales in the eight weeks following her murder. The album helped increase local record shops in Texas who were "selling more than when [Selena] was alive". Amor Prohibido remained at number one on the Top Latin Albums chart for 16 weeks following her death until the release of her crossover album Dreaming of You replaced it on August 5. The album remained behind Dreaming of You for seven weeks. By the end of 1995, Amor Prohibido ranked second to Dreaming of You for the best-selling Latin album for that year, and remained the best-selling regional Mexican recording for three consecutive years.

After 98 weeks the album dropped from the top five on the Top Latin Albums chart, though it remained within the top ten for 12 additional weeks. Amor Prohibido holds the record for most weeks at number one on the Regional Mexican Albums chart at 97 weeks, and is the only album to reach number one in four different calendar years. (Note: In March 2005, Billboard reported that Amor Prohibido remained the only album to reach number one on the Regional Mexican Albums chart in three different calendar years. After Billboard removed its ban of catalog titles in its Latin music charts in February 2017, Amor Prohibido claimed the top spot of the Regional Mexican Albums chart that May.) Amor Prohibido became the ninth best-selling Latin album of 1996, and ranked as the second best-selling Latin catalog album of 1997, while in 1998 it placed third. Billboard's revised catalog criteria made it ineligible for the Top Latin Albums and Regional Mexican Albums chart on January 18, 1997. The album was removed from the list and began charting on the newly formed Latin Catalog Albums chart positioned at number two. Since 1997, the album has spent 13 nonconsecutive weeks at number one on the Top Latin Catalog Albums chart including three weeks in 2010. Following another revision to its Latin albums charts, Billboard removed its two-decade-long ban of catalog albums in its chart beginning with the February 11, 2017 list; Amor Prohibido re-entered the Top Latin Albums and Regional Mexican Albums chart after 20 years. Still popular today, Nielsen SoundScan reported that Amor Prohibido was the ninth best-selling Latin record of 2016. After its revision, Amor Prohibido reclaimed the number one position on the Regional Mexican Albums chart in May 2017. Amor Prohibido was the first album by a woman to claim the top position since Jenni Rivera's Paloma Negra Desde Monterrey (2016). Amor Prohibido became the last album by a woman to claim the top spot until Rivera's daughter Chiquis Rivera debuted atop the chart in March 2018. As of 2018, the album has spent twenty weeks atop the Top Latin Albums chart, which is the ninth most weeks an album has spent at number one. Amor Prohibido has spent 111 weeks within the top ten of the Top Latin Albums chart, which is the second most weeks behind American singer Romeo Santos' Formula, Vol. 2 (2014).

In May 1995, the Recording Industry Association of America (RIAA) certified the album gold, for shipments of 500,000 units. Within three weeks, it was certified platinum for increments of one million units. Amor Prohibido became the first Tejano record to receive a platinum certification. The Sydney Morning Herald called the event "an achievement" for a Spanish-language album which was not "the music industry's language of choice." By June 1995, it had sold 1.5 million units in the US, (Note: According to Patoski, Amor Prohibido sold 1.5 million copies by June 1995, a source he obtained from Time magazine. While Behar, then-president of EMI Latin, said the album "nearly sold" that amount by November 1995. According to Nielsen SoundScan, Amor Prohibido has sold 1.246 million copies as of October 2017. The company, at one point in the 1990s, did not include sales from retail giants such as Wal-Mart. According to Leila Cobo, "many" shops that specializes in Latin music are not reported to Nielsen. Additionally, Nielsen SoundScan does not include sales from malls (i.e., FYE), discounted or sale priced CDs below 50% of the suggested list price, bulk purchases by a single individual, mom and pop shops, small retailers without electronic cash registers, and nontraditional outlets such as flea markets and drugstores are not reported to SoundScan.) of which 100,000 were sold in Puerto Rico alone. In March 2011, the RIAA updated its certification of Amor Prohibido as double Diamond during an unveiling of the United States Postal Service's forever stamps honoring Selena and several other Hispanic/Latino Americans. The album was remastered for its 30th anniversary, selling 11,000 units across multiple configurations. It debuted at number four on the US Top Album Sales chart on the week ending July 20, 2024, achieving its highest peak position. Amor Prohibido debuted atop the US Top Vinyl Albums chart, marking her second number-one title in this category, and debuted at number 20 on the US Top Catalog Albums chart, and returned to the Billboard 200 chart at number 69. As of March 2024, the album has been certified 41× platinum (Latin), denoting 2.46 million album-equivalent units sold. Amor Prohibido is the second-highest certified Latin album in the United States trailing only her posthumous album Dreaming of You (1995). Amor Prohibido is the fourth best-selling Latin album of all-time in the US with over 1.246 million copies sold as of October 2017. The album has sold over 2.5 million copies worldwide. The recording has been ranked as the best-selling Tejano album of the 1990s, and the best-selling Tejano album of all-time.

== Track listing ==
Credits adapted from the liner notes of Amor Prohibido.

No.	Title	Writer(s)	Producer(s)	Length
1.	"Amor Prohibido"	Selena Quintanilla-Pérez; A.B. Quintanilla III; Pete Astudillo	Quintanilla III; Jorge Alberto Pino; Bebu Silvetti; Gregg Vickers	2:49
2.	"No Me Queda Más"	Ricky Vela	Quintanilla III; Silvetti	3:17
3.	"Cobarde"	José Luis Borrego	Borrego	2:50
4.	"Fotos y Recuerdos"	Chrissie Hynde; Vela	Quintanilla III	2:33
5.	"El Chico Del Apartamento 512"	Quintanilla III; Vela	Quintanilla III	3:28
6.	"Bidi Bidi Bom Bom"	Selena; Astudillo	Quintanilla III	3:25
7.	"Techno Cumbia"	Quintanilla III; Astudillo	Quintanilla III	3:43
8.	"Tus Desprecios"	Quintanilla III; Vela	Quintanilla III	3:24
9.	"Si Una Vez"	Quintanilla III; Astudillo	Quintanilla III	2:42
10.	"Ya No"	Quintanilla III; Vela	Quintanilla III	3:56
Total length:				35:27

2002 re-release bonus tracks
No.	Title	Writer(s)	Producer(s)	Length
11.	"Donde Quiera Que Estés" (duet with Barrio Boyzz)	KC Porter; Miguel Flores; Desmond Child	Quintanilla III; Domingo Padilla; Silvetti	4:29
12.	"Spoken Liner Notes" (commentary recollections provided by Selena's family, friends, and her band)	Nir Seroussi	Suzette Quintanilla	24:02
13.	"Amor Prohibido" (music video)	Selena; Quintanilla III; Astudillo	Sean Roberts	2:50
14.	"No Me Queda Más" (music video)	Vela	Roberts	3:49

== Credits and personnel ==
Credits adapted from the liner notes of Amor Prohibido.

Vocal credits

- Selena – vocals, background vocals, composer
- Stephanie Lynn, Rick Alvarez, "Rock 'n' Roll" James – background vocals

Visuals and imagery

- Lisette Lorenzo – art direction
- Maurice Rinaldi – photography

Instruments

- Suzette Quintanilla – drums, producer
- Chris Pérez – electric guitar, drum programming, arranger
- A.B. Quintanilla – bass guitar, bajo sexto
- Henry Gomez – guitar
- Joe Ojeda – keyboards, arranger
- Ricky Vela – keyboards, programming, arranger, composer
- Johnny Saenz – accordion
- Rafael Gasca – trumpet
- Rene Gasca – trumpet
- Gilbert Garza – trombone

Technical and production credits

- A.B. – composer, producer, programming, mixing, arranger
- Jorge A. Pino – executive producer
- Brian "Red" Moore – engineer, mixing
- Nir Seroussi – editing
- Guillermo J. Page – reissue producer
- Bebu Silvetti – arranger, producer

== Charts ==
=== Weekly charts ===
Chart (1994–1995)	Peak position
Panama (EFE)	6
US Billboard 200	29
US Top Latin Albums	1
US Regional Mexican Albums	1
Chart (2009)	Peak position
US Top Latin Catalog Albums	1
US Regional Mexican Catalog Albums	1
Chart (2024)	Peak position
US Billboard 200	69
US Top Album Sales	4
US Top Vinyl Albums	1
US Top Catalog Albums	20

=== Quarterly charts ===
Chart (1997)	Peak position
US Regional Mexican Catalog Albums	1
Chart (2017)	Peak position
US Latin Album Sales	5

=== Year-end charts ===
Chart (1994)	Position
US Top Latin Albums	4
US Regional Mexican Albums	1
Chart (1995)	Position
US Billboard 200	164
US Top Latin Albums	2
US Regional Mexican Albums	1
Chart (1996)	Position
US Top Latin Albums	6
US Regional Mexican Albums	1
Chart (1997)	Position
US Latin Catalog Albums	2
Chart (1998)	Position
US Latin Catalog Albums	3
Chart (2012)	Position
US Latin Catalog Albums	6
Chart (2013)	Position
US Latin Catalog Albums	17
Chart (2014)	Position
US Latin Catalog Albums	14
Chart (2015)	Position
US Latin Catalog Albums	4
Chart (2016)	Position
US Latin Catalog Albums	4
Chart (2017)	Position
US Top Latin Albums	32
US Regional Mexican Albums	9
US Latin Catalog Albums	3
Chart (2018)	Position
US Top Latin Albums	76
US Latin Catalog Albums	6
Chart (2019)	Position
US Latin Catalog Albums	5

== Certifications and sales ==
Region	Certification	Certified units/sales
Mexico (AMPROFON)	3× Gold	400,000
United States (RIAA)	41× Platinum (Latin)	1,246,000
Summaries
Worldwide		2,500,000

== See also ==
- 1994 in Latin music
- Selena albums discography
- List of number-one Billboard Top Latin Albums from the 1990s
- Billboard Regional Mexican Albums Year-end Chart, 1990s
- List of number-one Billboard Regional Mexican Albums of 1994
- List of number-one Billboard Regional Mexican Albums of 1995
- List of number-one Billboard Regional Mexican Albums of 1996
- List of best-selling Latin albums
- List of best-selling Latin albums in the United States
- Latin American music in the United States
- Women in Latin music

== Works cited ==
- "Top Latin Albums > April 16, 1994". Billboard. Vol. 106, no. 16. April 16, 1994. p. 43. ISSN 0006-2510.
- "Top Latin Albums > June 11, 1994". Billboard. Vol. 106, no. 24. June 11, 1994. p. 32. ISSN 0006-2510.
- "Heatseekers Albums > July 16, 1994". Billboard. Vol. 106, no. 29. July 16, 1994. p. 19. ISSN 0006-2510.
- "1994: The Year in Music". Billboard. Vol. 106, no. 52. December 24, 1994. p. 60. ISSN 0006-2510.
- "Ad Space". The Galveston Daily News. April 15, 1994.
- "Promueve Selena en Mexico "Amor Prohibido"". El Siglo de Torreón. November 6, 1994.
- "Mercado Iberoamericano del Disco". El Informador. September 27, 1994.
- "Hot Latin Songs > February 4, 1995". Billboard. Vol. 107, no. 5. February 4, 1995. p. 43. ISSN 0006-2510.
- "Regional Mexican Albums > March 4, 1995". Billboard. Vol. 107, no. 9. March 4, 1995. p. 41. ISSN 0006-2510.
- "Hot Latin Songs > April 8, 1995". Billboard. Vol. 107, no. 14. April 8, 1995. p. 49. ISSN 0006-2510.
- "Billboard 200 > May 13, 1995". Billboard. Vol. 107, no. 19. May 13, 1995. p. 116. ISSN 0006-2510.
- "Hot Latin Songs > June 3, 1995". Billboard. Vol. 107, no. 22. June 3, 1995. p. 47. ISSN 0006-2510.
- "Hot Latin Tracks > July 1, 1995". Billboard. Vol. 107, no. 26. July 1, 1995. p. 37. ISSN 0006-2510.
- "Records". Spin. 11 (5). August 1995.
- "Top Latin Albums > September 16, 1995". Billboard. Vol. 107, no. 37. September 16, 1995. p. 37. ISSN 0006-2510.
- "Born on the Border". Newsweek. October 22, 1995. Archived from the original on March 5, 2016.
- "1995: The Year in Music". Billboard. Vol. 107, no. 51. December 23, 1995. p. 78. ISSN 0006-2510.
- "Music stores report selling out of musician's tapes, CDs". Corpus Christi Caller-Times. April 1, 1995. Archived from the original on April 5, 2018.
- "'Juan' More Time". Los Angeles Times. May 21, 1995. Archived from the original on April 5, 2018 – via Newspapers.com.
- "Valley Pop Music Charts". Los Angeles Times. June 2, 1995. Archived from the original on April 5, 2018 – via Newspapers.com.
- "Los 20 Discos Más Vendidos en Puerto Rico". TeVe Guia (in Spanish). June 17–23, 1995.
- "Miles de admiradores lloran la muerte de Selena". El Pregonero.
- "Top Latin Albums > February 17, 1996". Billboard. Vol. 108, no. 7. February 17, 1996. p. 47. ISSN 0006-2510.
- "Top Latin Albums > May 25, 1996". Billboard. Vol. 108, no. 21. May 25, 1996. p. 50. ISSN 0006-2510.
- "1996: The Year in Music". Billboard. Vol. 108, no. 52. December 28, 1996. pp. 3, 38. ISSN 0006-2510.
- "Regional Mexican Catalog Albums > July 19, 1997". Billboard. Regional Mexican Music. Vol. 109, no. 29. July 19, 1997. p. 52. ISSN 0006-2510.
- Jennifer Lopez, Edward James Olmos, Jon Seda, Jackie Guerra (March 21, 1997). Selena (DVD). Warner Bros. Event occurs at 127 minutes.
- "1997: The Year in Music". Billboard. Vol. 109, no. 52. December 27, 1997. ISSN 0006-2510.
- "Movie Soundtrack 'Selena' Fails to Show Singer At her Best". The News Tribune. March 25, 1997.
- "Topping The Charts Year By Year". Billboard. Vol. 110, no. 48. November 28, 1998. p. LMQ3.
- "1998: The Year in Music". Billboard. Vol. 110, no. 52. December 26, 1998. p. 31. ISSN 0006-2510.
- "The Chart Toppers". Billboard. Vol. 112, no. 2. Prometheus Global Media. January 8, 2000. p. 116. ISSN 0006-2510.
- "Diez Anos sin Selena". Milenio (in Spanish) (389–396). Diario de Monterrey: 388–390. March 31, 2005.
- Anon. (November 26, 2008). "Selena: Biography". Biography. 60 minutes in. A&E.
- Anon. (November 14, 2008). "Top Tr3ce Selena Moments". Top Tr3ce. Season 1. Episode 4. 60 minutes in. MTV Tres.
- "Reviven a Selena con el disco de colección 'La reyna'". Informador (in Spanish). March 31, 2009. Archived from the original on July 9, 2019.
- "Latin Catalog Albums Year-end Chart, 2012". Billboard.
- "Latin Catalog Albums Year-end Chart, 2013". Billboard.
- "Latin Catalog Albums Year-end Chart, 2014". Billboard.
- "The 50 Greatest Latin Albums of the Past 50 Years". Billboard. Archived from the original on June 4, 2016.
- "Latin Catalog Albums Year-end Chart, 2015". Billboard.
- "Greatest of All-Time Hot Latin Songs". Billboard.
- "Latin Catalog Albums Year-end Chart, 2016". Billboard.
- "Top Latin Albums > February 11, 2017". Billboard.
- "Regional Mexican Albums > February 11, 2017". Billboard.
- "Regional Mexican Albums > May 27, 2017". Billboard.
- "Top Latin Albums Year-end chart, 2017". Billboard.
- "Regional Mexican Albums Year-end chart, 2017". Billboard.
- "Regional Mexican Albums Year > January 14, 2017". Billboard.
- "Latin Catalog Albums Year-end Chart, 2017". Billboard.
- "Selena: The Life and Legacy of Tejano's Queen". Newsweek. Topix Media Specials. 2018. 778624701411.
- "Top Latin Albums of 2018". Billboard.
- "Latin Catalog Albums Year-end Chart, 2018". Billboard.
- "Latin Catalog Albums Year-end Chart, 2019". Billboard.
- "The 500 Greatest Albums of All Time". Rolling Stone.
- Anon. (July 16, 2024). "Top Catalog Albums > July 20, 2024". Billboard.com.
- "RIAA Gold & Platinum". RIAA.com. Archived from the original on August 21, 2016.
- "Tejano Music Past Award Winners". Texas Talent Association. Archived from the original on September 30, 2000.
- "SoundScan US Sales Procedures" (PDF). Nielsen SoundScan. Archived from the original (PDF) on October 27, 2011.
- "RIAA Diamaente Awards". RIAA.com.
- Alford, Steven (February 5, 2015). "New Selena DVD showcases rare television performance footage". Corpus Christi Caller-Times. Archived from the original on March 4, 2016.
- Arrarás, María Celeste (1997). Selena's Secret: The Revealing Story Behind Her Tragic Death. Simon and Schuster. ISBN 0-684-83193-7.
- Arrillaga, Pauline (March 31, 1996). "Notoriety". Santa Maria Times – via Newspapers.com.
- Ayres, Keith A. (May 1995). "Selena". Texas Beat. 6 (128): 13.
- Barron, Alicia (March 14, 2019). "People Are Celebrating Selena's "Amor Prohibido" Album on Its 25th Anniversary". BuzzFeed.com.
- Barrios, Gregg (August 21, 1994). "Never Heard of Selena? You Will". Los Angeles Times. Archived from the original on April 5, 2018 – via Newspapers.com.
- Beamer, Randy (April 1995). "Selena Remembered". n.a. 30 minutes in. NBC. KMOL.
- Beamer, Randy (March 5, 2021). "Como La Flor Author Opens Up About Selena and the Quintanillas". WOAI San Antonio.
- Ben-Yehuda, Ayla (January 9, 2010). "Never To Be Forgotten". Billboard. Vol. 122, no. 1. ISSN 0006-2510.
- Bisantz, Max; Bisantz, Kate (2018). Who Was Selena?. Penguin Publications. ISBN 978-1101995501.
- Blanco-Cano, R.; Urquijo-Ruiz, R. (2011). Global Mexican Cultural Productions. Springer Publications. ISBN 978-0-230-37039-5.
- Blumenthal, Howard J. (1997). The World Music CD Listener's Guide. New York, NY: Billboard Books. ISBN 0-8230-7663-6.
- Bogdanov, Vladimir (2001). All Music Guide: The Definitive Guide to Popular Music (4th ed.). San Francisco, CA: Backbeat Books. ISBN 0-87930-627-0.
- Briceño, Norberto (February 10, 2014). "35 Old-School Latino Albums You Probably Forgot About". BuzzFeed. Archived from the original on April 4, 2018.
- Bruns, Roger (2008). Icons of Latino America : Latino Contributions to American Culture (1st ed.). Westport, CT: Greenwood Press. ISBN 978-0-313-34087-1.
- Broughton, Simon; Ellingham, Mark (2000). World Music: Latin & North America, Caribbean, India, Asia and Pacific. Rough Guides. ISBN 1-85828-636-0.
- Browne, David (May 12, 1995). "Selena: Crossover Dreams". Entertainment Weekly. p. 2. Archived from the original on November 6, 2016.
- Bustios, Pamela. "Ozuna's 'Odisea' Becomes Longest-Leading No. 1 by a Male Artist on Top Latin Albums Chart". Billboard. Archived from the original on March 28, 2018.
- Bustios, Pamela. "Chiquis Rivera Notches Second No. 1 on Regional Mexican Albums Chart With 'Entre Botellas'". Billboard. Archived from the original on April 5, 2018.
- Bustios, Pamela. "Shakira & Maluma Debut in Top 20 on Hot Latin Songs With 'Clandestino'". Billboard.
- Burr, Ramiro (August 12, 1994). "The top groups in Latin pop, Tejano and Mexican cumbias". San Antonio Express-News.
- Burr, Ramiro (April 17, 1994). "La Mafia, Selena top new releases Ramiro Burr, Latin Notes". San Antonio Express-News.
- Burr, Ramiro (March 2, 1994). "Selena wins a Grammy for 'Live' recording". San Antonio Express-News.
- Burr, Ramiro (April 21, 1994). "Dizzying Amount of New Music Here, On its Way". Austin American-Statesman – via Newspapers.com.
- Burr, Ramiro (February 25, 1995). "Selena Reigns at Tejano Music Awards". Billboard. Vol. 107, no. 8. ISSN 0006-2510.
- Burr, Ramiro (July 28, 1995). "Dreaming' falls short of 400,000, still selling". San Antonio Express-News.
- Burr, Ramiro (June 7, 1995). "Pura Vida honors (Jay) Perez and Selena". San Antonio Express-News.
- Burr, Ramiro (1999). The Billboard Guide to Tejano and Regional Mexican Music. Billboard Books. ISBN 0-8230-7691-1.
- Burr, Ramiro; Smith, Liz (November 5, 1996). "Selena CDs forever". San Antonio Express-News.
- Burr, Ramiro (May 24, 2003). "Rap And Hip-Hop Fusion Fuel Regional Mexican Scene". Billboard. Vol. 115, no. 21. Prometheus Global Media. p. 72. ISSN 0006-2510.
- Burr, Ramiro (March 3, 2005). "Still in Love With Selena". Billboard. Prometheus Global Media.
- Burr, Ramiro (April 14, 2005). "Selena: ¡Vive!, Celebrates A Musical Legacy". San Antonio Express-News.
- Burr, Ramiro (January 28, 2007). "Feliciano Makes New Album With Friends and on His Own". El Paso Times – via Newspapers.com.
- Burns, Kristine H. (2002). Women and Music in America Since 1900 (2nd ed.). Westport, CT: Greenwood Press. ISBN 1-57356-309-9.
- Caputo, Salvatore (July 23, 1995). "Tejano Music Gaining a Hold in Mainstream Pop Market". The Spokesman Review – via Newspapers.com.
- Carlos, Marjon (September 29, 2016). "The Enduring Style Influence of Selena". Vogue. Archived from the original on April 5, 2018.
- Catlin, Roger (July 22, 1995). "Singer Selena Missed Her Dream of Crossover Success". Hartford Courant.
- Caulfield, Keith (July 12, 2017). "Luis Fonsi & Daddy Yankee's 'Despacito,' Shakira's 'El Dorado' Rule Nielsen Music's Mid-Year 2017 Latin Charts". Billboard. Archived from the original on July 17, 2018.
- Clark, Michael (March 25, 2005). "Ten years after her murder, Selena lives on". Houston Chronicle. Archived from the original on September 25, 2015.
- Clarke, Donald (1998). The Penguin Encyclopedia of Popular Music. Penguin Books. ISBN 978-0-14-051147-5.
- Cobo, Leila (October 19, 2002). "Singles Review". Billboard. Vol. 114, no. 42. p. 20.
- Cobo, Leila (May 31, 2003). "Expolit focuses on need for more, better data". Billboard. Nielsen Business Media, Inc. p. 48.
- "What Happened in Latin Music in 2016? Consumption Up, Market Divided". Billboard. January 6, 2017. Archived from the original on July 17, 2018.
- Cobo, Leila (2021). Decoding "Despacito" : an oral history of Latin music (1 ed.). New York. p. 240. ISBN 978-0593081341.
- Cohen, Howard (March 17, 1997). "Soundtrack Fails To Capture Selena's Gift". The Santa Fe New Mexican – via Newspapers.com.
- Colloff, Pamela (April 2010). "Dreaming of Her". Texas Monthly. Archived from the original on August 18, 2016.
- Collins, Scott (July 14, 1995). "Tracking Sales in Booming Business Can be Difficult". Los Angeles Times – via Newspapers.com.
- Constable, Pamela (April 4, 1995). "Area Latinos Mourn a 'Good Daughter'; Slain Pop Star Selena Had Won a Special Place in the Hearts of Many". The Washington Post. Archived from the original on November 15, 2018 – via HighBeam Research.
- Constable, Pamela (July 30, 1995). "Coming of Age in Its 25th Year; In D.C., Latino Festival Offers an Array of Food and Cultures". The Washington Post. Archived from the original on July 31, 2017 – via HighBeam Research.
- Del Toro, Jesus (March 31, 2005). "Selena 10 Anos". Rumbo de San Antonio. "Lo mejor de Selena paso por las manos de Red. "Fue una sorpresa", recuerda Red. "Muchos pensaban que la que iba a pegar fuerte era "La Carcacha". Pero la cancion que toco el corazon de todos fue "Como la Flor". Esa cancion convirtio a Selena en la numero uno". Pero vendrian mas. "Todo el disco Amor Prohibido lo grabamos en dos semanas". "La primera noche hicimos las secuencias de las partes de teclados hasta las 4 am." Despues grabamos a los musicos y por ultimo, Selena grabo su parte en tiempo record: era maravillosa. El martes de la segunda semana me llama Abraham y me disc "Estare en San Antonio este fin de semana Puedes traerme una mezcla que pueda oir?" Entonces, terminamos todo, le llevamos la mezcla y el nos hacia sugerencias. Pero le encanto inmediatamente y yo me puse muy feliz." En plena entrevista entra Abraham al estudio. Al ver a Red, sonrie. "Red!", grita Abraham, abrazandolo. "El Rojo, El Colorado...A este tenemos que vestirlo de vikin go. Es un heroe."
- Diaz-Hurtado, Jessica. "The 150 Greatest Albums Made By Women". NPR. Archived from the original on April 5, 2018.
- Doeden, Matt (2012). American Latin Music: Rumba Rhythms, Bossa Nova, and the Salsa Sound. Twenty-First Century Books. ISBN 978-1-4677-0147-1.
- Doing, Deb (July 27, 2012). "The Best Texas Songs of All Time: #59-40". Dallas Observer. Archived from the original on April 24, 2018.
- Erlewine, Stephen Thomas. "Amor Prohibido > Album Review". Allmusic.
- Erlewine, Stephen Thomas. "Amor Prohibido > List of releases". Allmusic.
- Estevez, Marjua (October 17, 2017). "The Top 25 Biggest Selling Latin Albums of the Last 25 Years: Selena, Shakira & More". Billboard. Prometheus Global Media. Archived from the original on October 17, 2017.
- Fletcher, Michael; Getz, Robert P.; Fletcher, Nathan; Morales, Joe (March 1999). "En Persona: Selena". En Persona (in Spanish and English). 60 minutes in. TC Network. Galavision. "Abraham Quintanilla: And when she sang it or recorded it she put all her soul to it. And that she had tears in her eyes, you know, her eyes were watery because she knew how Ricky (Vela) felt. Suzette Quintanilla: I guess "Si Una Vez" because I think Selena really liked to give that attitude in that song."
- Flores, Adolfo (April 13, 2015). "Selena's Brother Tells The Untold Story Behind 7 of Her Biggest Hits". BuzzFeed News. Archived from the original on October 28, 2016.
- Gonzales, Carolina (July 31, 2015). "Selena Performs Live at Astroworld". Houston Chronicle. Archived from the original on April 5, 2018.
- Guerra, Joey (March 25, 2005). "Collective recordings of Selena span a number of genres". Houston Chronicle. Archived from the original on April 4, 2018.
- Guerra, Joey (November 1, 2017). "The stories behind Selena's legacy and biggest hits". Houston Chronicle. Archived from the original on April 4, 2018.
- Dansby, Andrew; Guerra, Joey; Darling, Cary; Kearney, Syd; Gray, Chris; Morast, Robert (August 8, 2018). "The 50 Greatest Texas Musicians Ever". Houston Chronicle. Archived from the original on August 12, 2018.
- Guerra, Joey (March 14, 2019). "Selena's 'Amor Prohibido' was released 25 years ago". Houston Chronicle.
- Yvonne Guidry (September 24, 2020). "Keynote Conversation with Suzette Quintanilla at Spoiled Latina Day". YouTube (Podcast). Event occurs at 42:35.
- Harrington, Richard (July 26, 1995). "Slain Tejano Singer's Album Tops Pop Chart". The Washington Post. Archived from the original on March 5, 2016.
- Hernández, Ellie D. (2009). Postnationalism in Chicana/o Literature and Culture (1st ed.). University of Texas Press. ISBN 978-0-292-71907-1.
- Herrera, Isabelia (March 26, 2023). "Selena: Amor Prohibido Album Review". Pitchfork.
- Hoffman, Frank (2004). Encyclopedia of Recorded Sound (1st ed.). Routledge. ISBN 1-135-94950-6.
- Holston, Mark (September 1994). "Reviews: Music". Hispanic. 7 (8): 90. ISSN 0898-3097.
- Jackson, La (2014). Musicology 2102: A Quick Start Guide to Diverse Synergies. L.A. Jackson. ISBN 978-0-578-15469-5.
- Jacobs, Sally (October 29, 1995). "Saint Selena?". Sun Sentinel.
- Echavarria, James (February 1994). "Selena Recording Her New Album". Puro Tejano. Entravision Communications.
- Jasinski, Laurie E. (2012). Handbook of Texas Music. Denton, TX: Texas A&M University Press. ISBN 978-0-87611-297-7.
- Jakle, Jeanne (May 10, 1995). "Connolly urged to step down as 'Forum' host". San Antonio Express-News.
- Jones, Steve (2000). Afterlife as Afterimage: Understanding Posthumous Fame. Peter Lang. ISBN 0-8204-6365-5.
- Jones, Veda Boyd (2013). Selena (They Died Too Young). Infobase Learning. ISBN 978-1-4381-4637-9.
- Kot, Greg (November 23, 1994). "The Gift of Song". Chicago Tribune. Archived from the original on April 4, 2018.
- Kot, Greg (November 18, 1995). "For Some Rock Stars, The Big Chill Was What They Needed to Get Hot". The State (Columbia, South Carolina).
- LaFollette, Jon (January 8, 2016). "Selena / The Rough Guide to Rare Latin Groove". The Monitor. Round Round. Archived from the original on November 16, 2018.
- Lannert, John (June 18, 1994). "Selena Grabs Top Spot on Latin 50". Billboard. Vol. 106, no. 25. p. 34. ISSN 0006-2510.
- Lannert, John (June 25, 1994). "Latin Notas". Billboard. Vol. 106, no. 26. p. 66. ISSN 0006-2510.
- Lannert, John (July 23, 1994). "Latin Notas". Billboard. Vol. 106, no. 30. p. 40. ISSN 0006-2510.
- Lannert, John (August 13, 1994). "Secada Tops Selena, Earns 5th No. 1" (PDF). Billboard. Latin Notas. Vol. 106, no. 33. p. 29. ISSN 0006-2510.
- Lannert, John; Burr, Ramiro (November 26, 1994). "Label Roundup: Current Acts & Activities". Billboard. Viva Mexico. Vol. 106, no. 48. p. 66. ISSN 0006-2510.
- Lannert, John; Bronson, Fred; Mayfield, Geoff (April 15, 1995). "Selena's Tragedy Echoed in Charts". Billboard. Vol. 107, no. 15. pp. 72, 80, 82. ISSN 0006-2510.
- Lopetegui, Enrique (November 5, 2013). "Cumbia: How Colombia made Selena a star". San Antonio Current.
- Martinez, Walter (May 1995). "Adios Selena". Latin Style. 1 (5).
- Malone, Chris (January 4, 2021). "Selena Was Inspired By Fish When She Wrote 'Bidi Bidi Bom Bom'". ShowBiz Cheatsheet.
- Mejias-Rentas, Antonio (April 13, 1995). "Selena, numero uno". La Opinión. 69 (210).
- McIntyre, Hugh (July 16, 2024). "Selena Charts A Brand New No. 1 Nearly 30 Years After Her Death". Forbes.
- McNerthney, Casey (February 6, 2013). "Did 1994 produce the best of the '90s albums?". Seattle Post-Intelligencer. Archived from the original on April 4, 2018.
- Mendizabal, Amaya (January 31, 2017). "Maluma Achieves Rare Feat: Nos. 1 & 2 on Latin Airplay Chart". Billboard. Archived from the original on April 4, 2018.
- Moreno, Carolina; Ramirez, Tanisha (October 6, 2016). "19 Latino '90s Songs That Were Totally Your Jam". Huffington Post. Archived from the original on April 4, 2018.
- Lannert, John (April 22, 1995). "Selena's Albums Soar; EMI Rushes Shipments". Billboard. Vol. 107, no. 16. pp. 8, 100. ISSN 0006-2510.
- Lannert, John (June 3, 1995). "Posthumous Certifications For Selena". Billboard. Vol. 107, no. 22. ISSN 0006-2510.
- Lannert, John (June 10, 1995). "A Retrospective". Billboard. Vol. 107, no. 23. pp. 54, 62. ISSN 0006-2510.
- Lannert, John (August 5, 1995). "Selena's 'Dreaming of You' Set Is Bittersweet Hit For Late EMI Star". Billboard. Vol. 107, no. 31. ISSN 0006-2510.
- Lannert, John (January 18, 1997). "Latin Notas". Billboard. Vol. 109, no. 3. ISSN 0006-2510.
- Leal, Lisa. "Fans pay tribute to fallen Tejano Star Selena". KVTV.com. Archived from the original on April 4, 2018.
- Liner, Elaine (April 4, 1995). "Selena's Family Isn't Talking About Where Dinos Go From Here". Corpus Christi Caller-Times. Archived from the original on April 5, 2018.
- Malone, Bill C. (2003). Southern Music/American Music. Lexington, KY: University Press of Kentucky. ISBN 0-8131-2635-5.
- Márquez, Herón (2001), Latin Sensation, Twenty-First Century Books, ISBN 0-8225-4993-X
- Mitchell, Andrew (April 21, 2015). "Editorial: How to grow this city, not just economically". Corpus Christi Caller Times.
- Miguel, Guadalupe San (2002). Tejano Proud: Tex-Mex Music in the Twentieth Century. Texas A&M University Press. ISBN 1-58544-188-0. - Read online, registration required
- McLane, Daisann (1997). The Rolling Stone Book of Women in Rock: Trouble Girls. Random House. ISBN 0-679-76874-2.
- McCarthy, Philip (April 15, 1995). "Crossfire". The Sydney Morning Herald – via Newspapers.com.
- McLeese, Don (July 13, 1995). "Selena crosses over 'Dreaming' could be multicultural hit she sought". Austin American-Statesman.
- Morales, Ed (2009). The Latin Beat: The Rhythms And Roots Of Latin Music From Bossa Nova To Salsa And Beyond. Da Capo Press. ISBN 978-0-306-81018-3.
- Montiel, Rafael (April 16, 1995). "Selena Morir Por Amor [Selena Died Because of Love]". Impacto (2354): 37. "Su primera aparición en nuestro país sucedio durante un baile masivo en Nuevo Leon, en donde la gente le brindó una inolvidable recepción. Enseguida se empezaron a editar sus discos y las ventas no se hicieron esperar. Las producciones que a la postre alcanzaron Disco de Oro fueron Baila Esta Cumbia, Quiero, Selena Live!, y Amor Prohibido."
- Morris, Chris (May 13, 1995). "Boss A Mover in RIAA-Certified Sales". Billboard. Vol. 107, no. 19. ISSN 0006-2510.
- Moon, Tom (2008). 1,000 Recordings to Hear Before You Die: A Listener's Life List. Workman Publishing. ISBN 978-0-7611-3963-8.
- Moreno, Cynthia (March 23, 2011). "Cinco Celebridades Latinas Homenajeadas Con Estampilla". The Fresno Bee (in Spanish) – via Newspapers.com.
- Molina, Alejandra (March 29, 2015). "LGBT group to host tribute for Selena in Santa Ana". The Orange County Register. Archived from the original on September 6, 2017.
- Nidia, Elsa (March 24, 2005). "Our Favorite Selena Songs". Tucson Citizen – via Newspapers.com.
- Novas, Himilce (1995). Remembering Selena (1st ed.). Sagebrush Education Resources. ISBN 0-613-92637-4.
- Orozco, Gisela (March 26, 2015). "Chicago Celebra a Selena [Chicago Celebrates Selena]". Chicago Tribune. Archived from the original on April 5, 2018.
- Parédez, Deborah (2009). Selenidad: Selena, Latinos, and the Performance of Memory. Duke University Press. ISBN 978-0-8223-9089-3.
- Patoski, Joe Nick (1996). Selena: Como La Flor. Boston: Little Brown and Company. ISBN 0-316-69378-2.
- Patoski, Jose Nick (December 4, 2020). "Dance Away Your 2020 Blues With Selena's Best Songs". Elle.
- Peoples, Glenn. "A Year Later: Michael Jackson's Massive Sales Impact". Billboard.
- Peralta, Eyder (March 27, 2005). "Amor Prohibido". Houston Chronicle.
- Pérez, Chris (2012). To Selena, with Love. Penguin Books. ISBN 978-1-101-58026-4.
- Perez, Emma (1999). The Decolonial Imaginary: Writing Chicanas Into History (1st ed.). Indiana University Press. ISBN 0-253-21283-9.
- Perone, James E. (2012). The Album: A Guide to Pop Music's Most Provocative, Influential, and Important Creations. ABC-CLIO. ISBN 978-0-313-37907-9.
- Philips, Chuck (February 28, 1995). "Industry Stewing Over Grammys". Austin American-Statesman – via Newspapers.com.
- Prampolini, Gaetano; Pinazzi, Annamaria (2013). Essays on the Literary Cultures of the American Southwest. Firenze University Press. ISBN 978-88-6655-393-9.
- Pressley, Sue Anne (October 12, 1995). "Defense Points to Role of Selena's Father in Dispute". The Washington Post.
- Quaintance, Zack (March 25, 2010). "Selena's songs are far from forgotten 15 years after her death". The Monitor.
- Quintanilla, Selena (1994). Amor Prohibido (Media notes). A.B. Quintanilla (producer), Suzette Quintanilla (spoken liner notes producer). EMI Latin. 724354099403.
- Ramirez, Erika (October 8, 2011). "Hot Latin Songs Top Artists". Billboard. Vol. 123, no. 35. New York. ISSN 0006-2510.
- Ramirez, Rauly (April 2, 2011). "Joan Sebastian's Eighth No. 1". Billboard. Vol. 123, no. 11. p. 66. ISSN 0006-2510.
- Ramirez, Rauly (March 31, 2015). "Celebrating Selena on her 20th anniversary". Billboard. ISSN 0006-2510. Archived from the original on April 8, 2018.
- Riemenschneider, Chris (July 27, 1995). "Selena's 'Dreaming' Album Premieres in No. 1 Spot". Los Angeles Times. Archived from the original on March 6, 2016.
- Richmond, Clint (1995). Selena! : The Phenomenal Life and Tragic Death of the Tejano Music Queen (1st ed.). New York, N.Y.: Pocket Books. ISBN 0-671-54522-1.
- Rivas, Jorge (March 31, 2011). "Remembering Selena's Trailblazing Music". ColorLines. Archived from the original on July 1, 2017.
- Robb, Jacqueline (2000). Go, Girl!: Young Women Superstars of Pop Music (1st ed.). Greensboro, NC: Avisson Press. ISBN 1-888105-45-3.
- Rodriguez, Brenda (April 1, 1995). "Stunned Local Fans Rush To Music Stores". The Monitor.
- Rodriguez, Lori Beth (2008). Mapping Tejana Epistemologies. ISBN 978-0-549-51061-1.
- Roiz, Jessica Lucia (September 17, 2015). "Say Goodbye To Sábado Gigante With Some of Its Most Memorable Moments!". Latin Times. Archived from the original on September 19, 2016.
- Roiz, Jessica Lucia (June 8, 2015). "Selena Quintanilla on NBC Universo: When, Where To Watch Back-To-Back Queen Of Tejano Special". Latin Times. Archived from the original on October 11, 2016.
- Roiz, Jessica. "Selena's 'Amor Prohibido' Celebrates 25 Years". Billboard.
- Roiz, Jessica. "20 Questions with Danna Paola: Mexican Singer Opens Up About Her Most Personal Album Yet, 'K.O.'". Billboard.
- Ruiz, Julieta (March 31, 2015). "Selena: 10 canciones para "cortarte las venas"". De10.com.mx. Archived from the original on September 6, 2017.
- Schone, Mark (April 20, 1995). "A Postmortem Star in death, Selena is a crossover success". Newsday.
- Schone, Mark (April 20, 1995). "A Postmortem Star". Newsday – via Newspapers.com.
- Snow, Shauna (April 22, 1995). "Morning Report". Los Angeles Times – via Newspapers.com.
- Shaw, Tucker (2007). The Hookup Artist. Harper Collins. ISBN 978-0-06-075620-8.
- Steib, Matt (March 25, 2015). "Tejano Music Queen's Legacy Still Strong 20 Years After Her Passing". San Antonio Current. Anything for Selenas. p. 46.
- Stavans, Ilan; Augenbraum, Harold (2005). Encyclopedia Latina: History, Culture, And Society In The United States (4th ed.). Danbury, CT: Grolier Academic Reference. ISBN 0-7172-5815-7.
- Tarradell, Mario (December 29, 1994). "Tejano Music Finds Mass Appeal in Latin and Anglo Markets in 1994". Hartford Courant – via Newspapers.com.
- Tarradell, Mario (June 29, 1994). "Album Reviews". The Miami Herald – via Newspapers.com.
- Tarradell, Mario (April 1, 1995). "Singer soared beyond traditional limits on Tejano music". The Dallas Morning News.
- Tarradell, Mario (July 17, 1995). "Selena's Dreaming of You". El Paso Times – via Newspapers.com.
- Tarradell, Mario (March 16, 1997). "Selena's Power: Culture Fusion". The Dallas Morning News.
- Tarradell, Mario (February 23, 2000). "Top 10 Latin Albums of the 1990s". The Billings Gazette – via Newspapers.com.
- Tarradell, Mario (March 31, 2005). "10 years after her death, her life and music are not forgotten". The Dallas Morning News.
- Torres, Marco (December 14, 2012). "The Texas 30: Texas' 6 Best Latin Albums of the Past 30 Years". Houston Press. Archived from the original on April 5, 2018.
- Untiedt, Kenneth L. (2013). Cowboys, Cops, Killers, and Ghosts: Legends and Lore in Texas. University of North Texas Press. ISBN 978-1-57441-532-2.
- Valdes-Rodriguez, Alisa (December 10, 1999). "Latin Music: Bigger Than Reported?". Los Angeles Times.
- Verhovek, Sam Howe (April 1, 1995). "Grammy-Winning Singer Selena Killed in Shooting at Texas Motel". The New York Times. p. 1. Archived from the original on July 20, 2016.
- Velez, Ashley. "Top 5 Selena Songs". Neon Tommy. USC Annenberg School for Communication and Journalism. Archived from the original on August 15, 2018.
- Verna, Paul (April 2, 1994). "Album Reviews". Billboard. Vol. 106, no. 14. p. 52. ISSN 0006-2510.
- Verna, Paul (June 1, 1996). "Album Reviews". Billboard. Vol. 108, no. 22. ISSN 0006-2510.
- Watrous, Peter (September 19, 1994). "Mexican Independence in New York". The New York Times. Archived from the original on August 27, 2016.
- Wimer, Sarah (June 28, 1996). "Amor Prohibido: Selena's Crossover Dreams". Austin Chronicle. Archived from the original on September 6, 2017.
- Wheeler, Jill C. (1995). Selena: The Queen of Tejano (1st ed.). Edina, Minnesota: Abdo & Daughters. ISBN 1562395238.
- Zellner, Xander. "Romeo Santos' 'Golden' Earns Biggest Week of 2017 for a Latin Studio Album". Billboard. Archived from the original on October 26, 2017.
