= Si Una Vez =

1995 single by Selena

Promotional single by Selena

from the album Amor Prohibido
- Released: 1994
- Studio: AMEN Studios (San Antonio, TX)
- Genre: Mariachi; cumbia
- Length: 2:50
- Label: EMI Latin
- Songwriters: Pete Astudillo; A.B. Quintanilla III
- Producers: A.B. Quintanilla; Bebu Silvetti

Audio sample
- Si Una Vez: file; help

"Si Una Vez" (English: If I Once) is a song recorded by American recording artist Selena for her fourth studio album, Amor Prohibido (1994). It was written by Pete Astudillo and produced by Selena's brother-producer A.B. Quintanilla. "Si Una Vez" is a mariachi fusion song and draws influence from cumbia and Latin dance music. Lyrically, Selena questions why she ever fell in love with an abusive partner, saying she will never repeat her mistakes. The lyrics suggest unrequited love and female empowerment.

"Si Una Vez" received positive reviews from music critics who found the song to have showcase the singer's vocal abilities. The Broadcast Music Inc. recognized it as the Single of the Year at the 1996 BMI Pop Awards. Many musicians have since recorded the song and released it on their respective albums including Mexican mariachi singer Alicia Villareal, American reggaeton performer Ivy Queen, American indie rock band Girl in a Coma, and American salsa singer Manny Manuel. The latter's version peaked at number one on the United States Billboard Tropical Songs chart, and ended 1995 as the fourteenth most successful U.S. tropical song.

== Background and composition ==
"Si Una Vez" was written by Selena y Los Dinos backup dancer and vocalist Pete Astudillo. The song was co-written by Selena's brother-producer A.B. Quintanilla who, along with Argentine musician Bebu Silvetti, served as producers. Keyboardist of the group, Ricky Vela retold in a 2002 interview how the band hired a professional trumpeter to record parts of the song. In the live version performed at the Astrodome for Selena’s last concert in 1995, the trumpet intro was mostly replaced with a bell synth playing the background melodies. "Si Una Vez" is a Spanish-language mariachi fusion track with influences of cumbia and Latin dance music. Author Deborah Paredez called "Si Una Vez" as having punk music undertones. In 2002, A.B. spoke on how Amor Prohibido was experimental music-heavy and commented on how "Si Una Vez" was an example of his ideas of keeping the band's image modern. The song makes use of the Guitarrón guitar under a cumbia beat.

"Si Una Vez" is written in the key of D minor and is played in a moderate groove of 84 beats per minute. It incorporates music from several musical instruments, including the piano and guitar. Lyrically, Selena reminiscences her failed relationship and wonders why she ever fell in love with an abusive partner who betrayed and left her, vowing to never allow a man like that back into her life. The lyrics suggest unrequited love and female empowerment.

== Critical reception and legacy ==
"Si Una Vez" was named by the Latin Times as one of the top-ten best karaoke songs sung in Spanish. Writing for the Latin Times, Maria Valdez called the song "fun" especially when running into your former partner at a karaoke party and found the track to showcases a singer's vocal abilities. Texas Public Radio's Nathan Cone, said "the song "resonates best" with South Texas". Entertainment Weekly contributor David Browne, commented on Selena's vocals as being "full-throated, warbling" and that it "recalls Lydia Mendoza, conjunto's leading lady." A New University writer found the recording to have "showcase [the singer's] passion with her vocals."

Selena performed the song during one her final performances on March 12, 1995 during the Calle Ocho Festival in Miami, which attracted over 100,000 fans. Selena was shot and killed by Yolanda Saldívar, her friend and former manager of the singer's Selena Etc. clothing boutiques, on March 31, 1995. Selena's performance of the song during her Houston Astrodome concert on February 26, 1995, was emulated by Jennifer Lopez as her role as the singer for the 1997 biopic film about Selena. "Si Una Vez" is considered by Billboard magazine to be one of Selena's signature songs. Terra named "Si Una Vez" as one of Selena's "most famous works" along with her other songs "El Chico del Apartamento 512", "Amor Prohibido" and "Fotos y Recuerdos". The Broadcast Music, Inc. (BMI) recognized "Si Una Vez" at the BMI Pop Music Awards as Single of the Year in 1996.

== Covers ==
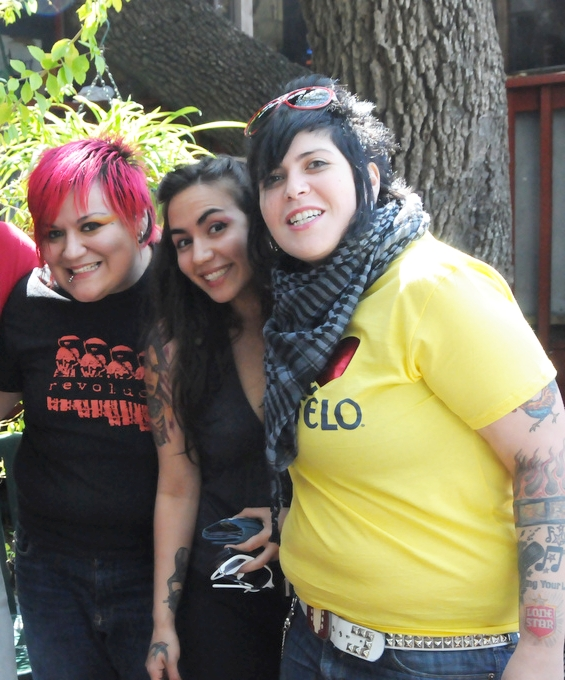
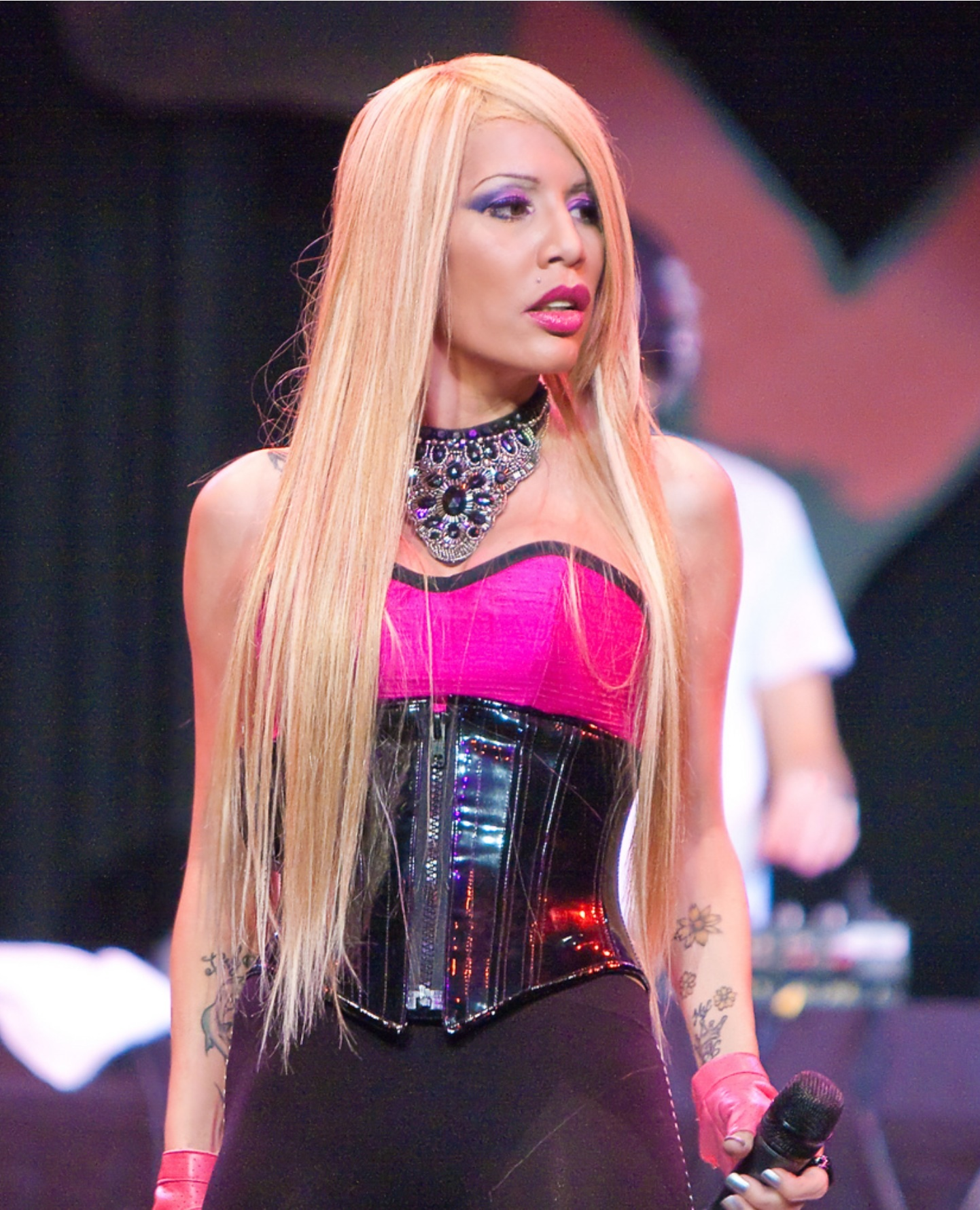
Girl in a Coma (pictured left) and Ivy Queen (pictured right) recorded their versions of "Si Una Vez", citing the song as having some form of influence on their careers.

Mexican singer Mary Boquitas recorded the song for the tribute album Mexico Recuerda a Selena (2005). Mexican mariachi singer Alicia Villareal performed and recorded "Si Una Vez" for the live televised tribute concert Selena ¡VIVE! in April 2005. American reggaeton singer Ivy Queen covered "Si Una Vez" for her fifth studio album Flashback (2005). She said in an interview how she felt "honored to be able to cover one of Selena's songs". Ivy Queen chose to cover "Si Una Vez" finding it to be identifiable to her and because of the song's message which the singer stood for. Jonathan Widran of AllMusic called her versions a "reggaetón-ed up twist". In 2010, indie rock group Girl in a Coma recorded a punk cover of "Si Una Vez". The group decided to record the song because it was their favorite recordings of Selena. Girl in a Coma performed the song live during the 2010 Tejano Music Awards as a homage to Selena. In April 2011, A.B.'s band Kumbia All-Starz performed their version of the song during their tour for La Vida De Un Genio (2010) in Bolivia. Colombian singer Kali Uchis performed "Si Una Vez" at the 2015 SXSW festival. Vibe magazine found Uchis' performance to have given them "shivers".

== Charts ==
Chart performance for "Si Una Vez"
Chart (1995)	Peak position
US Regional Mexican Songs (Billboard)	4
Mexico Grupera Songs (El Siglo de Torreón)	1

== Certifications ==
Certifications for "Si Una Vez"
Region	Certification	Certified units/sales
United States (RIAA)	3× Platinum (Latin)	180,000^{‡}
^{‡} Sales+streaming figures based on certification alone.

== Awards ==
Awards for "Si Una Vez"
Year	Awards ceremony	Award	Results
1994	BMI Pop Music Awards	Song of The Year	Won

== Covers ==
=== Manny Manuel version ===
"Si Una Vez"

Single by Manny Manuel

from the album El Rey de Corazones
- Released: September 3, 1995
- Recorded: 1994
- Genre: Merengue
- Label: RMM
- Songwriters: Pete Astudillo; A.B. Quintanilla III
- Producers: Luisin Marti; Jamie Querol

Manny Manuel singles chronology
"Pero Qué Necesidad" (1994)	"Si Una Vez" (1995)	"Distanciado (La Foto)" (1996)

American merengue musician Manny Manuel covered the song on his debut album, El Rey de Corazones (1995). Out of the five singles released from the album, "Si Una Vez" was Manuel's most successful single off of the El Rey de Corazones album. The song debuted at number 29 on the United States Billboard Hot Latin Tracks and number three on the U.S. Tropical Songs chart. The following week, "Si Una Vez" rose to numbers 22 and two on the Hot Latin Songs and Tropical Songs chart, respectively. On October 14, 1995, the track climbed to number 21 on the Hot Latin Songs chart, while it fell to number four on the Tropical Songs chart. In its fourth week, "Si Una Vez" jumped to number 18 on the Hot Latin Songs chart, while over at the Tropical Songs chart the song rose to number three. Despite increased airplay spins, "Si Una Vez" fell to number 20 on the Hot Latin Songs chart. On November 11, 1995, "Si Una Vez" peaked at number one on the Tropical Songs chart for one week, receiving airplay honors that week.

==== Chart performance ====
Weekly chart performance for "Si Una Vez" by Manny Manuel
Chart (1995)	Peak position
US Hot Latin Songs (Billboard)	18
US Tropical Airplay (Billboard)	1

Year-end chart performance for "Si Una Vez" by Manny Manuel
Chart (1995)	Position
US Tropical Songs (Billboard)	14

=== Play-N-Skillz version ===
"Si Una Vez (If I Once)"

Single by Play-N-Skillz featuring Frankie J, Leslie Grace, Wisin, Becky G and Kap G
- Released: December 6, 2016 (original version); February 24, 2017 (Spanglish version); March 31, 2017 (English version)
- Recorded: 2016
- Genre: Reggaeton; video game music
- Length: 3:57
- Label: Sony Music Latin
- Songwriters: Pete Astudillo; A.B. Quintanilla III
- Producer: Play-N-Skillz

Play-N-Skillz singles chronology
"Not A Crime" (2016)	"Si Una Vez (If I Once)" (2016)	"Hey Guapo" (2017)

Frankie J singles chronology
"Extraño" (2016)	"Si Una Vez (If I Once)" (2016)	"“Lowrider”" (2017)

Leslie Grace singles chronology
"Nada de Amor" (2016)	"Si Una Vez (If I Once)" (2016)	"“Diganle”" (2017)

Wisin singles chronology
"Duele el Corazón" (2016)	"Si Una Vez (If I Once)" (2016)	"Escapate Conmigo" (2017)

Becky G singles chronology
"Mangú" (2016)	"Si Una Vez (If I Once)" (2017)	"Todo Cambio" (2017)

Kap G singles chronology
"Girlfriend" (2016)	"Si Una Vez (If I Once)" (2017)	"Rings" (2017)

Hip-hop production duo Play-N-Skillz produced a cover of the song, featuring Frankie J, Leslie Grace and Wisin. Spanglish and English versions of the song, with Becky G and Kap G in place of Grace and Wisin, were released on February and March 2017 and are included in the soundtrack of the 2017 video game Tom Clancy's Ghost Recon Wildlands. The track has gone on to peak at number one on the US Billboard Latin Rhythm Digital Song Sales and number two on the US Billboard Latin Digital Song Sales.

==== Weekly charts ====
Weekly chart performance for "Si Una Vez" by Play-N-Skillz
Chart (2017)	Peak position
US Bubbling Under Hot 100 (Billboard)	11
US Hot Latin Songs (Billboard)	22
US Latin Airplay (Billboard)	34
US Pop Airplay (Billboard)	39
US Rhythmic Airplay (Billboard)	23

==== Year-end charts ====
Year-end chart performance for "Si Una Vez" by Play-N-Skillz
Chart (2017)	Position
US Hot Latin Songs (Billboard)	84

==== Sales ====
Sales for "Si Una Vez" by Play-N-Skillz
Region	Certification	Certified units/sales
United States (RIAA)	4× Platinum (Latin)	61,000
^{‡} Sales+streaming figures based on certification alone.

== Credits and personnel ==
All credits were taken from the album's liner notes.

- Selena – vocals
- Joe Ojeda – keyboards
- Ricky Vela – keyboards
- Chris Pérez – guitar
- Suzette Quintanilla – drums
- Los Dinos – bajo sexto
- A.B. Quintanilla III – writer
- Pete Astudillo – writer
- Lisette Lorenzo – art direction

== See also ==
- Latin music in the United States
- List of Billboard Tropical Airplay number ones of 1994 and 1995

== Notes ==
- Perone, James E. (2012). The Album: A Guide to Pop Music's Most Provocative, Influential, and Important Creations. ABC-CLIO. ISBN 978-0313379079.
- Paredez, Deborah (2012). Selenidad: Selena, Latinos, and the Performance of Memory. Duke University Press. ISBN 978-0822390893.
- Patoski, Joe Nick (1996). Selena: Como La Flor. Boston: Little Brown and Company. ISBN 0-316-69378-2.
