= List of Billboard Regional Mexican Albums number ones of 1994 =

The Regional Mexican Albums, published in Billboard magazine, is a record chart that features Latin music sales information for regional styles of Mexican music. This data are compiled by Nielsen SoundScan from a sample that includes music stores, music departments at department stores and verifiable sales from concert venues in the United States.

== Albums ==
Issue Date	Album	Artist	Reference
January 1	Canciones De Mi Padre	Linda Ronstadt	
January 8	Pura Sangre	Bronco	
January 15	Canciones De Mi Padre†	Linda Ronstadt	
January 22	Pura Sangre	Bronco	
January 29	Pura Sangre	Bronco	
February 5	Pura Sangre	Bronco	
February 12	Pura Sangre	Bronco	
February 19	Pura Sangre	Bronco	
February 26	Pura Sangre	Bronco	
March 5	Pura Sangre	Bronco	
March 12	Pura Sangre	Bronco	
March 19	Pura Sangre	Bronco	
March 26	Pura Sangre	Bronco	
April 2	Pura Sangre	Bronco	
April 9	Amor Prohibido	Selena	
April 16	Amor Prohibido	Selena	
April 23	Amor Prohibido	Selena	
April 30	Amor Prohibido	Selena	
May 7	Amor Prohibido	Selena	
May 14	Amor Prohibido	Selena	
May 21	Amor Prohibido	Selena	
May 28	Amor Prohibido	Selena	
June 4	Amor Prohibido	Selena	
June 11	Amor Prohibido	Selena	
June 18	Amor Prohibido	Selena	
June 25	Amor Prohibido	Selena	
July 2	Amor Prohibido	Selena	
July 9	Amor Prohibido	Selena	
July 16	Amor Prohibido	Selena	
July 23	Amor Prohibido	Selena	
July 30	Amor Prohibido	Selena	
August 6	Amor Prohibido	Selena	
August 13	Amor Prohibido	Selena	
August 20	Amor Prohibido	Selena	
August 27	Amor Prohibido	Selena	
September 3	Amor Prohibido	Selena	
September 10	Amor Prohibido	Selena	
September 17	Amor Prohibido	Selena	
September 24	Amor Prohibido	Selena	
October 1	Amor Prohibido	Selena	
October 8	Amor Prohibido	Selena	
October 15	Amor Prohibido	Selena	
October 22	Amor Prohibido	Selena	
October 29	Amor Prohibido	Selena	
November 5	Amor Prohibido	Selena	
November 12	Amor Prohibido	Selena	
November 19	Amor Prohibido	Selena	
November 26	Amor Prohibido	Selena	
December 3	Amor Prohibido	Selena	
December 10	Amor Prohibido	Selena	
December 17	Amor Prohibido	Selena	
December 24	Amor Prohibido	Selena	
December 31	Amor Prohibido	Selena	
