= Oye, ¿Dónde Está El Amor? =

Single by Wisin & Yandel featuring Franco De Vita

from the album Wisin vs. Yandel: Los Extraterrestres
- Released: January 7, 2008
- Recorded: 2007
- Genre: Latin pop, R&B, conscious hip hop
- Length: 5:00
- Songwriters: Juan Luis Morera, Llandel Veguilla, Franco de Vita
- Producers: Victor "El Nasi", Nesty "La Mente Maestra" & Gomez

Wisin & Yandel singles chronology
"Sexy Movimiento" (2007)	"Oye, ¿Dónde Está El Amor?" (2008)	"Ahora Es" (2008)

"Oye, ¿Dónde Está El Amor?" (English: "Listen, Where is the Love?") is the second single released from Wisin & Yandel's album Wisin vs. Yandel: Los Extraterrestres and features Franco De Vita. The live version of the song was performed with Kany García at Wisin & Yandel concert in Puerto Rico.

== Samples ==
- Main chorus sampled from "Donde Está El Amor" by Franco De Vita.

== Charts ==
Chart (2008)	Peak position
Billboard Hot Latin Songs	25
