= Wisin vs. Yandel: Los Extraterrestres =

Studio album by Wisin & Yandel
- Released: November 6, 2007
- Recorded: 2006–2007
- Genres: Reggaeton; R&B; hip hop; pop
- Labels: WY; Machete
- Producers: Nesty "La Mente Maestra"; Victor "El Nasi"; Marioso; Tainy; Gomez; Monserrate & DJ Urba; Sizzle

Wisin & Yandel chronology
Tomando Control: Live (2007)	Wisin vs. Yandel: Los Extraterrestres (2007)	Wisin & Yandel Presentan: La Mente Maestra (2008)

Singles from Wisin vs. Yandel: Los Extraterrestres
- 1. "Sexy Movimiento" Released: August 31, 2007; 2. "Ahora Es" Released: November 7, 2007; 3. "Oye, ¿Dónde Está El Amor?" Released: January 7, 2008

Los Extraterrestres: Otra Dimensión
- Los Extraterrestres: Otra Dimensión re-edition cover

Singles from Los Extraterrestres: Otra Dimensión (English: The Extraterrestrials/Aliens: Another Dimension)
- 1. "Síguelo" Released: July 30, 2008; 2. "Dime Que Te Paso" Released: August 14, 2008

Wisin vs. Yandel: Los Extraterrestres (English: The Extraterrestrials/Aliens) is the fifth studio album by Puerto Rican reggaeton duo Wisin & Yandel, released on November 6, 2007, by Machete Music. On November 13, 2008, the album received the Latin Grammy Award for Best Urban Music Album and Lo Nuestro Award for Urban Album of the Year. Also, the album won Grammy Award for Best Latin Urban Album on 2009.

Los Extraterrestres debuted at number 14 on Billboard 200 with selling over 53,000 copies. The album sold over 430,000 copies making it the top selling Latin album of United States of 2008 and more than 1.5 million copies worldwide making it one of the best selling reggaeton albums of all time.

== Critical reception ==
Professional ratings
Review scores
Source	Rating
Allmusic	4/5 stars

Jason Birchmeier of Allmusic gave the album four stars out of five, calling it "good news for those who enjoy state-of-the-art reggaeton without any experimentation" and specifically mentioning that "the employment of first-rate producers Nesty, Tainy, El Nasi, and Monserrate and DJ Urba in the place of Wisin & Yandel's former beatmakers-in-chief, Luny Tunes, ensures the quality of the music." He summarized the review by saying that "the result is a new-yet-familiar album sure to please the duo's fan base, and likely grow it as well as the hits mount."

== Chart and Commercial performance ==
The album entered the Billboard 200 at number 14, the fourth highest rank in reggaeton history, shared only by King of Kings (Don Omar) which peaked at number 7, El Cartel: The Big Boss (Daddy Yankee), which peaked at number 9, and Talento de Barrio (Daddy Yankee), which peaked at number 12. It sold over 53,000 copies in the first week in the United States and It peaked at number 1 on the Billboard Top Latin Albums chart and at the year-end charts of 2008, this album ranked at number one. It has been certified 3× Platinum by the RIAA Latino. During the 2008, the album sold 250,000 copies making it the second best Latin selling album in the United States of that year. As of May 2009, the album sold 434,000 copies.

The album was a commercial success in Latin America. In Mexico, it debuted at number 26 and was certified Gold for selling 40,000 copies. Also, it was certified Platinum in Colombia, Costa Rica and Venezuela and Gold in Chile and Central America. By 2016, the album had sold 1.5 million copies.

== Track listing ==
Standard Edition
No.	Title	Writer(s)	Length
1.	"Intro"	Marcos Masis, Juan Luis Morera, Llandel Veguilla	3:01
2.	"Ahora Es"	Victor Martinez, Juan Luis Morera, Ernesto Padilla, Llandel Veguilla	3:26
3.	"Aprovéchalo"	Marcos Masis, Juan Luis Morera, Llandel Veguilla	2:49
4.	"Pidiendo Calor"	Victor Martinez, Juan Luis Morera, Ernesto Padilla, Llandel Veguilla	3:04
5.	"Control" (featuring Eve)	Eve Jeffers, Juan Luis Morera, Llandel Veguilla	3:44
6.	"Una Noche Más"	Juan Luis Morera, Llandel Veguilla, Jose Gomez	4:28
7.	"Dime Quienes Son"	Victor Martinez, Juan Luis Morera, Ernesto Padilla, Llandel Veguilla	3:52
8.	"Las Cosas Cambiaron" (featuring Don Omar)	William Omar Landron, Juan Luis Morera, Ernesto Padilla, Llandel Veguilla	3:46
9.	"Sexy Movimiento"	Victor Martinez, Juan Luis Morera, Ernesto Padilla, Llandel Veguilla	3:29
10.	"Ya Me Voy"	Luis Cortes, Juan Luis Morera, Ernesto Padilla, Llandel Veguilla	3:45
11.	"Presión"	Victor Martinez, Juan Luis Morera, Ernesto Padilla, Llandel Veguilla, Francisco Galan	3:26
12.	"Imagínate" (featuring Tony Dize)	Victor Martinez, Juan Luis Morera, Ernesto Padilla, Llandel Veguilla	3:26
13.	"Te Hice Mujer"	Marcos Masis, Juan Luis Morera, Llandel Veguilla, Palmer Hernandez	3:19
14.	"Como Tú No Hay Nadie" (featuring Jayko)	Victor Martinez, Juan Luis Morera, Ernesto Padilla, Llandel Veguilla	3:16
15.	"Vicio De Ti"	Victor Martinez, Juan Luis Morera, Ernesto Padilla, Llandel Veguilla	3:21
16.	"Oye, ¿Dónde Está El Amor?" (featuring Franco de Vita)	Juan Luis Morera, Llandel Veguilla, Franco de Vita	5:00
17.	"Jangueo" (featuring Fat Joe & Erick Right)	Joseph Cartagena, Erick Rodriguez, Juan Luis Morera, Llandel Veguilla, Kazha "Sizzle" Hornsby	3:36
18.	"Tu Cuerpo Me Llama" (featuring Gadiel)	Marcos Masis, Juan Luis Morera, Llandel Veguilla	3:04
19.	"¿Por Qué Me Tratas Así?"	Marcos Masis, Juan Luis Morera, Llandel Veguilla	4:03
Total length:			1:07:32

Zune Special Edition Track
No.	Title	Length
20.	"Tu Mirada" (the track is commonly referred to as "Me Le Pegue") (featuring Franco "El Gorilla")	3:18
Total length:		1:10:50

Los Extraterrestres: Otra Dimensión - Disc 2
No.	Title	Writer(s)	Length
1.	"Dame Un Poquito"	Ramon Otero, Juan Luis Morera, Llandel Veguilla	3:48
2.	"Síguelo"	Ernesto Padilla, Victor Martinez
3.	"Tus Sábanas"	Marcos Masis	3:29
4.	"Ánimo" (featuring Tego Calderón)	Ernesto Padilla, Tego Calderón 3:25	3:15
5.	"Dime Qué Te Pasó"	Ernesto Padilla, Victor Martinez	4:26
6.	"Sexy Movimiento" (Remix) (Featuring Nelly Furtado)	Nelly Furtado, Ernesto Padilla	3:56
Total length:			1:29:53

Los Extraterrestres: Otra Dimensión - DVD
No.	Title	Length
1.	"Ahora Es" (Music Video)	4:51
2.	"Sexy Movimiento" (Music Video)	4:30
3.	"Síguelo" (Music Video)	3:49
4.	"Oye, ¿Dónde Está El Amor?" (Music Video) (featuring Franco de Vita)	5:27
5.	"Yo Te Quiero" (Music Video)	3:58
6.	"Exclusive Interview"	10:04

== Credits and personnel ==
Executive Producers

- Gustavo Lopez
- Juan Luis Morera
- Llandel Veguilla

A&R

- Carolina Arenas

A&R Coordinator

- Aldo Gonzalez

Mixed by

- Marioso

Production Coordinator

- Ana Alvarado

Mastering

Sterling Studio

- Tom Coyne

Public Relations

Halo Communications

- Lourdes Perez

Photography

- Edwin David

Creative & Art Direction

- Iancarlo "Conqui" Reyes
- Michelle "Huracan Castigo" Benitez

== Charts and certifications ==
=== Weekly charts ===
Chart (2007)	Peak position
Argentine Albums (CAPIF)	8
Chilean Albums (Feria Del Disco)	5
Ecuadorian Albums (Musicalisimo)	6
US Billboard 200	14
US Top Latin Albums (Billboard)	1
US Latin Rhythm Albums (Billboard)	1
Venezuelan Albums (Recordland)	1

=== Year-end charts ===
Chart (2007)	Position
US Top Latin Albums (Billboard)	67

Chart (2008)	Position
US Billboard 200	124
US Top Latin Albums (Billboard)	1

Chart (2009)	Position
US Top Latin Albums (Billboard)	32

=== Certifications ===
Region	Certification	Certified units/sales
Chile	Gold	15,000
Costa Rica	Platinum	
Colombia	Platinum	
Mexico (AMPROFON)	Gold	50,000^{^}
United States (RIAA)	3× Platinum (Latin)	434,000
Venezuela (APFV)	Platinum	
Summaries
Central America (CFC)	Gold	
^{^} Shipments figures based on certification alone.

== Release history ==
Region	Date (Standard version)	Date (Re-edition version)
Canada	November 13, 2007	May 27, 2008
United Kingdom	November 6, 2007	June 30, 2008
United States	November 6, 2007	May 27, 2008

== Accolades ==
Year	Recipient	Award	Result	Ref.
2008	Los Extraterrestres	Latin Billboard Music Awards – Latin Album of the Year	Nominated	
2008	Los Extraterrestres	Latin Billboard Music Awards – Reggaeton Album of the Year	Won	
2008	Los Extraterrestres	Latin Grammy Awards – Best Urban Music Album	Won	
2008	Los Extraterrestres	Premios Juventud – CD To Die For	Won	
2008	«Oye, ¿Dónde Está El Amor?»	Premios Juventud – Perfect Combination	Nominated	
2008	«Sexy Movimiento»	Premios Juventud – Favorite Video	Nominated	
2009	Los Extraterrestres	Grammy Awards – Best Latin Urban Album	Won	
2009	Los Extraterrestres	Latin Billboard Music Awards – Latin Rhythm Album of the Year, Duo or Group	Won	
2009	«Ahora Es»	Latin Billboard Music Awards – Tropical Airplay Song of the Year, Duo or Group	Nominated	
2009	«Ahora Es»	Latin Billboard Music Awards – Latin Rhythm Airplay Song of the Year, Duo or Group	Nominated	
2009	«Síguelo»	Latin Billboard Music Awards – Latin Rhythm Airplay Song of the Year, Duo or Group	Nominated	
2009	Los Extraterrestres	Lo Nuestro Awards – Urban Album of the Year	Won	
2009	«Ahora Es»	Lo Nuestro Awards – Urban Song of the Year	Nominated	
2009	«Sexy Movimiento»	Lo Nuestro Awards – Urban Song of the Year	Nominated	

== See also ==
- List of number-one Billboard Latin Rhythm Albums of 2007
