= Sexy Movimiento =

Single by Wisin & Yandel

from the album Wisin vs. Yandel: Los Extraterrestres
- Released: August 31, 2007
- Recorded: May 17, 2007
- Studio: Mas Audio Production Recording Studios (Salamanca, NY); Sterling Sound (New York, NY)
- Genre: Reggaeton; electronica
- Length: 3:30
- Songwriters: Victor Martinez; Juan Luis Morera; Ernesto Padilla; Llandel Veguilla; Nelly Furtado (remix)
- Producers: Victor "El Nasi"; Nesty "La Mente Maestra"; Marioso

Wisin & Yandel singles chronology
| "Yo Te Quiero" (2007) | "Sexy Movimiento" (2007) | "Oye, ¿Dónde Está El Amor?" (2008) |

Music video
- "Sexy Movimiento" on YouTube

"Sexy Movimiento" (English: "Sexy Movement") is the first single from Wisin & Yandel's album Wisin vs. Yandel: Los Extraterrestres. In January 2008, the song reached number-one on the Billboard Hot Latin Tracks chart in the United States.

== Other ==
- A remix was done with Nelly Furtado that can be found on Los Extraterrestres: Otra Dimension.
- Other remixes were done with Julio Voltio, Daddy Yankee and Mega & Kenai.
- The song was included in the video game Grand Theft Auto IV, on the radio station named San Juan Sounds.
- The song was included on Ivy Queen's first live album Ivy Queen 2008 World Tour LIVE!.
- The song is used by Toronto Blue Jays player José Bautista when he comes up to bat.
- The song is featured on the Disney Channel animated series Elena of Avalor.
- Mexican female professional wrestler Sexy Star uses "Sexy Movimiento" as her theme song.

== Track listing and digital download ==
Original

1. "Sexy Movimiento" – 3:52

Remix

1. "Sexy Movimiento" (featuring Nelly Furtado) – 3:52

== Charts ==
=== Weekly charts ===
| Chart (2007–08) | Peak position |
|---|---|
| Chile Airplay (Los 40) | 9 |
| Colombian Airplay (Los 40) | 23 |
| US Billboard Hot 100 | 98 |
| US Hot Latin Songs (Billboard) | 1 |
| US Latin Pop Airplay (Billboard) | 31 |
| US Tropical Airplay (Billboard) | 1 |
| Venezuela Pop Rock (Record Report) | 3 |
| Venezuela Top 100 (Record Report) | 17 |

=== Year-end charts ===
| Chart (2008) | Position |
|---|---|
| US Hot Latin Songs (Billboard) | 17 |

== Accolades ==
=== American Society of Composers, Authors, and Publishers Awards ===
| Year | Nominee / work | Award | Result |
|---|---|---|---|
| 2009 | "Sexy movimiento" | Urban Song of the Year | Won |

== See also ==
- List of Billboard Latin Rhythm Airplay number ones of 2007
- List of Billboard Latin Rhythm Airplay number ones of 2008
