= List of Billboard Latin Rhythm Airplay number ones of 2008 =

The Billboard Latin Rhythm Airplay is a chart that ranks the most-played songs on Latin rhythm radio stations. Published by Billboard magazine, the data are compiled by Nielsen SoundScan based collectively on each single's weekly airplay.

== Chart history ==
Key
†	Indicates number 1 on Billboard's year-end Latin rhythm chart

Issue date	Song	Artist(s)	Ref.
January 5	"Sexy Movimiento"	Wisin & Yandel	
January 12	"Sexy Movimiento"	Wisin & Yandel	
January 19	"Sexy Movimiento"	Wisin & Yandel	
January 26	"Sexy Movimiento"	Wisin & Yandel	
February 2	"Sexy Movimiento"	Wisin & Yandel	
February 9	"Te Quiero" †	Flex	
February 16	"Te Quiero" †	Flex	
February 23	"Te Quiero" †	Flex	
March 1	"Soy Igual Que Tú"	Alexis & Fido featuring Toby Love	
March 8	"Te Quiero" †	Flex	
March 15	"Te Quiero" †	Flex	
March 22	"Soy Igual Que Tú"	Alexis & Fido featuring Toby Love	
March 29	"Te Quiero" †	Flex	
April 5	"El Perdedor"	Aventura	
April 12	"Ahora Es"	Wisin & Yandel	
April 19	"Ahora Es"	Wisin & Yandel	
April 26	"Ahora Es"	Wisin & Yandel	
May 3	"Ahora Es"	Wisin & Yandel	
May 10	"Te Quiero" †	Flex	
May 17	"Te Quiero" †	Flex	
May 24	"Te Quiero" †	Flex	
May 31	"Ahora Es"	Wisin & Yandel	
June 7	"El Perdedor"	Aventura	
June 14	"Pose"	Daddy Yankee	
June 21	"Pose"	Daddy Yankee	
June 28	"Pose"	Daddy Yankee	
July 5	"Pose"	Daddy Yankee	
July 12	"El Perdedor"	Aventura	
July 19	"Pose"	Daddy Yankee	
July 26	"Pose"	Daddy Yankee	
August 2	"Pose"	Daddy Yankee	
August 9	"Ya No Llores (Let Me Love You)"	Baby Boy	
August 16	"Síguelo"	Wisin & Yandel	
August 23	"Síguelo"	Wisin & Yandel	
August 30	"Síguelo"	Wisin & Yandel	
September 6	"Na De Na"	Angel & Khriz	
September 13	"Na De Na"	Angel & Khriz	
September 20	"Na De Na"	Angel & Khriz	
September 27	"Na De Na"	Angel & Khriz	
October 4	"Síguelo"	Wisin & Yandel	
October 11	"Dime"	Ivy Queen	
October 18	"Dime"	Ivy Queen	
October 25	"Dime"	Ivy Queen	
November 1	"Dime"	Ivy Queen	
November 8	"Dime"	Ivy Queen	
November 15	"Dime"	Ivy Queen	
November 22	"Te Regalo Amores"	R.K.M & Ken-Y	
November 29	"Te Regalo Amores"	R.K.M & Ken-Y	
December 6	"Te Regalo Amores"	R.K.M & Ken-Y	
December 13	"Te Regalo Amores"	R.K.M & Ken-Y	
December 20	"Dime"	Ivy Queen	
December 27	"Te Regalo Amores"	R.K.M & Ken-Y	

== See also ==
- List of number-one Billboard Hot Latin Songs of 2008
