= Ahora Es (song) =

- Promotional CD of the single

Single by Wisin & Yandel

from the album Wisin vs. Yandel: Los Extraterrestres
- Released: March 2008
- Recorded: November 2007
- Genre: Reggaeton
- Length: 3:29
- Label: Machete Music; WY Records
- Songwriters: Victor Martinez, Juan Luis Morera, Ernesto Padilla, Llandel Veguilla
- Producers: Victor "El Nasi"; Nesty "La Mente Maestra"

Wisin & Yandel singles chronology
"Oye, ¿Dónde Está El Amor?" (2008)	"Ahora Es" (2008)	"Síguelo" (2008)

"Ahora Es" (English: It's Now) is the third single by reggaeton duo Wisin & Yandel from their sixth studio album Wisin vs. Yandel: Los Extraterrestres, released in March 2008, by Machete Music. The melody resembles the song "Ay Cosita Linda" by Pacho Galan.

== Charts ==
=== Weekly charts ===
Chart (2008)	Peak position
Chile (EFE)	1
US Hot Latin Songs (Billboard)	5
US Latin Pop Airplay (Billboard)	34
US Tropical Airplay (Billboard)	3
Venezuela Pop Rock (Record Report)	5

=== Year-end charts ===
Chart (2008)	Position
US Hot Latin Songs (Billboard)	19

== Accolades ==
=== American Society of Composers, Authors, and Publishers Awards ===
Year	Nominee / work	Award	Result
2009	Ahora Es	Urban Song of the Year	Won

== See also ==
- List of Billboard Latin Rhythm Airplay number ones of 2008
