= List of Billboard Regional Mexican Albums number ones of 1995 =

The Regional Mexican Albums, published in Billboard magazine, is a record chart that features Latin music sales information for regional styles of Mexican music. This data are compiled by Nielsen SoundScan from a sample that includes music stores, music departments at department stores and verifiable sales from concert venues in the United States.

== Albums ==
Issue Date	Album	Artist	Reference
January 7	Amor Prohibido	Selena	
January 14	Amor Prohibido	Selena	
January 21	Amor Prohibido	Selena	
January 28	Amor Prohibido	Selena	
February 4	Amor Prohibido	Selena	
February 11	Amor Prohibido	Selena	
February 18	Amor Prohibido	Selena	
February 25	Amor Prohibido	Selena	
March 4	Rompiendo Barreras	Bronco	
March 11	Rompiendo Barreras	Bronco	
March 18	Rompiendo Barreras	Bronco	
March 25	Rompiendo Barreras	Bronco	
April 1	Amor Prohibido †	Selena	
April 8	Amor Prohibido †	Selena	
April 15	Amor Prohibido †	Selena	
April 22	Amor Prohibido †	Selena	
April 29	Amor Prohibido †	Selena	
May 6	Amor Prohibido †	Selena	
May 13	Amor Prohibido †	Selena	
May 20	Amor Prohibido †	Selena	
May 27	Amor Prohibido †	Selena	
June 3	Amor Prohibido †	Selena	
June 10	Amor Prohibido †	Selena	
June 17	Amor Prohibido †	Selena	
June 24	Amor Prohibido †	Selena	
July 1	Amor Prohibido †	Selena	
July 8	Amor Prohibido †	Selena	
July 15	Amor Prohibido †	Selena	
July 22	Amor Prohibido †	Selena	
July 29	Amor Prohibido †	Selena	
August 5	Amor Prohibido †	Selena	
August 12	Amor Prohibido †	Selena	
August 19	Amor Prohibido †	Selena	
August 26	Amor Prohibido †	Selena	
September 2	Amor Prohibido †	Selena	
September 9	Amor Prohibido †	Selena	
September 16	Amor Prohibido †	Selena	
September 23	Amor Prohibido †	Selena	
September 30	Amor Prohibido †	Selena	
October 7	Solo Para Ti	Mazz	
October 14	Amor Prohibido †	Selena	
October 21	Amor Prohibido †	Selena	
October 28	Amor Prohibido †	Selena	
November 4	Amor Prohibido †	Selena	
November 11	Amor Prohibido †	Selena	
November 18	Amor Prohibido †	Selena	
November 25	Amor Prohibido †	Selena	
December 2	Amor Prohibido †	Selena	
December 9	Amor Prohibido †	Selena	
December 16	Amor Prohibido †	Selena	
December 23	Amor Prohibido †	Selena	
December 30	Amor Prohibido †	Selena	
