= Síguelo =

Single by Wisin & Yandel

from the album Los Extraterrestres: Otra Dimensión
- Released: Puerto Rico July 25, 2008
- Recorded: August 27, 2007
- Genre: Reggaeton; Latin pop
- Length: 3:30
- Songwriters: Ernesto Padilla, Victor Martinez
- Producers: Marioso, Nesty "La Mente Maestra" & Victor "El Nasi"

Wisin & Yandel singles chronology
"Ahora Es" (2008)	"Síguelo" (2008)	"Dime Qué Te Pasó" (2008)

"Síguelo" (English: continue it (as in 'keep on going')) is a single by Puerto Rican reggaeton duo Wisin & Yandel from the re-edition album Los Extraterrestres: Otra Dimensión, released on July 25, 2008 by Machete Music. The official remix features former WY Records singer Jayko.

== Samples ==
- The song samples the famous James Brown "Woo! Yeah!" loop throughout the song. Due to this feature the song gathered popularity when released.

To avoid lawsuits, The song no longer contains the sample. The song has been edited from its original version on all streaming and music stores online.

== Charts ==
=== Weekly charts ===
Chart (2008)	Peak position
US Hot Latin Songs (Billboard)	8

=== Year-end charts ===
Chart (2008)	Position
US Hot Latin Songs (Billboard)	36

== Accolades ==
=== American Society of Composers, Authors, and Publishers Awards ===
Year	Nominee / work	Award	Result
2009	Síguelo	Urban Song of the Year	Won

== See also ==
- List of Billboard Latin Rhythm Airplay number ones of 2008
