= Billboard Top Latin Albums =

Record chart

Top Latin Albums (formerly Latin 50) is a record chart published by Billboard magazine since 1993. It is labeled as the most important music chart for Spanish-language, full-length albums in the American music market. To rank, an album must have 51% or more of its content recorded in Spanish.

Like all Billboard album charts, it is based on sales. Nielsen SoundScan compiles the sales data from merchants representing more than 90% of the U.S. music retail market. The sample includes sales at music stores, the music departments of electronics and department stores, direct-to-consumer transactions, and Internet sales of physical albums or digital downloads. A limited array of verifiable sales from concert venues is also tabulated. As of January 26, 2017, a multi-metric methodology to compile the Top Latin Albums chart was adopted by Billboard, which also incorporates track equivalent album units and streaming equivalent album units.

The first number-one album was Mi Tierra by Gloria Estefan. The longest-reigning number-one album is Debí Tirar Más Fotos by Bad Bunny, having spent 80 weeks at the top of the chart. Selena's Dreaming of You (1995–97) and Bad Bunny's YHLQMDLG (2020–22) and Un Verano Sin Ti (2022–24) are the only albums to peak at number one in three different calendar years.

Bad Bunny has the most number-one weeks for albums with 303, the most number-one debuting albums with 9, and the most number-one end-year albums with 7. Marco Antonio Solís has the most number-one albums with 12. Los Temerarios is the group with the most chart-toppers, eight. Jenni Rivera, Shakira, and Selena are the female artists with the most number-one albums with 7 each.

The current number-one album on the chart is Debí Tirar Más Fotos by Bad Bunny.

== History ==
On July 10, 1993, Billboard premiered the revamped Latin 50 chart, which lists the best-selling Latin albums in the overall American music market.

Before this, the first chart regarding Latin music albums in the magazine (Billboard Hot Latin LPs in Los Angeles) was published on the issue dated December 9, 1972. Y Volveré, by Chilean band Los Ángeles Negros, was the first album to appear at number-one. Then, all Latin music information was featured on the first incarnation of the Top Latin Albums chart, which began on June 29, 1985, and divided Latin records on three different genre subcharts: Pop, Regional Mexican and Tropical, all of them now published in addition to the overall chart. The Latin Pop Albums chart features music only from the pop genre, while the Regional Mexican Albums chart includes information from different genres like duranguense, norteño, banda and mariachi, and the Tropical Albums includes different genres particularly salsa, merengue, bachata, and cumbia. In May 2005, another chart, Latin Rhythm Albums, was introduced in response to growing sales of reggaeton records.

On the week ending January 26, 2017, Billboard updated the methodology to compile the Top Latin Albums chart into a multi-metric methodology to include track equivalent album units and streaming equivalent albums units.

== All-time achievements ==
=== Top 10 albums of all-time (1993–2018) ===
In 2018, Billboard magazine compiled a ranking of the 20 best albums on the chart since its inception in 1993. The ranking is based on the most number of weeks the albums spent on top of the chart. For albums with the same number of weeks at number one, they are ranked by the most total weeks on the chart.

Rank	Album	Artist(s)	Peak year	Peak and duration	Ref.
1	Mi Tierra (1993)	Gloria Estefan	1993	#1 for 58 weeks	
2	Odisea (2017)	Ozuna	2017	#1 for 46 weeks	
3	Dreaming of You (1995)	Selena	1995	#1 for 25 weeks	
4	Segundo Romance (1994)	Luis Miguel	1994	#1 for 29 weeks	
5	Vuelve (1998)	Ricky Martin	1998	#1 for 26 weeks	
6	Barrio Fino (2004)	Daddy Yankee	2004	#1 for 24 weeks	
7	The Last (2009)	Aventura	2009	#1 for 23 weeks	
8	Amor Prohibido (1994)	Selena	1994	#1 for 20 weeks	
9	Los Dúo, Vol. 2 (2015)	Juan Gabriel	2016	#1 for 20 weeks	
10	Mi Reflejo (2000)	Christina Aguilera	2000	#1 for 19 weeks	

=== Top 10 albums of the 21st century (2000–2024) ===
In 2025, Billboard magazine compiled a ranking of the 100 best albums on the chart through the first quarter of the 21st century, from the start of 2000 to the end of 2024. The ranking is based on weekly performance on the chart.

Rank	Album	Artist(s)	Peak year	Peak and duration	Ref.
1	YHLQMDLG (2020)	Bad Bunny	2020	#1 for 70 weeks	
2	Fórmula, Vol. 2 (2014)	Romeo Santos	2014	#1 for 11 weeks	
3	X 100pre (2019)	Bad Bunny	2019	#1 for 46 weeks	
4	Ones (2002)	Selena	2017	#2 for 1 week	
5	Odisea (2017)	Ozuna	2017	#1 for 46 weeks	
6	Un Verano Sin Ti (2022)	Bad Bunny	2022	#1 for 60 weeks	
7	Todavía Me Amas: Lo Mejor de Aventura (2016)	Aventura	2019	#4 for 1 week	
8	Un Día Normal (2002)	Juanes	2003	#1 for 4 weeks	
9	Barrio Fino (2004)	Daddy Yankee	2004	#1 for 24 weeks	
10	El Último Tour Del Mundo (2020)	Bad Bunny	2020	#1 for 27 weeks	

== Artist achievements ==
=== Artists with the most number-one albums ===
The following list contains the top artists per number of albums at number one on the Top Latin Album chart:

Albums	Artist(s)	Ref.
12	Marco Antonio Solís	
9	Bad Bunny	
9	Luis Miguel	
8	Enrique Iglesias	
8	Los Temerarios	
8	Maná	
8	Marc Anthony	
7	Alejandro Fernández	
7	Daddy Yankee	
7	Jenni Rivera	
7	Los Tigres del Norte	
7	Selena	
7	Shakira	
7	Ricky Martin	
6	Vicente Fernández	
5	Chayanne	
5	Don Omar	
5	Juan Gabriel	
5	Juanes	
5	Ozuna	
5	Prince Royce	
5	Romeo Santos	
5	Wisin & Yandel	
5	Karol G	

=== Artists with the most number-one weeks ===
The following list contains the top artists per number of weeks at number one on the Top Latin Album chart:

Weeks	Artist(s)	Ref.
303	Bad Bunny	
80	Enrique Iglesias	
77	Selena	
66	Ozuna	
63	Luis Miguel	
53	Marc Anthony	
51	Daddy Yankee	
49	Shakira	
41	Ricky Martin	
36	Romeo Santos	
32	Los Temerarios	
32	Juan Gabriel	
31	Marco Antonio Solís	
25	Maná	
23	Alejandro Fernández	
22	Jenni Rivera	
22	Los Tigres del Norte	
21	Don Omar	
17	Wisin & Yandel	
17	Vicente Fernández	

== Album achievements ==
=== Longest-reigning number-one albums ===
The following list contains the longest-leading albums per number of weeks at number one on the Top Latin Albums chart:

Weeks	Album	Artist(s)	Year(s)	Ref.
80	Debí Tirar Más Fotos	Bad Bunny	2025–26	
70	YHLQMDLG	Bad Bunny	2020–22	
60	Un Verano Sin Ti	Bad Bunny	2022–24	
58	Mi Tierra	Gloria Estefan	1993–94	
46	X 100pre	Bad Bunny	2019–20	
46	Odisea	Ozuna	2017–18	
44	Dreaming of You	Selena	1995–97	
29	Segundo Romance	Luis Miguel	1994–95	
28	Génesis	Peso Pluma	2023–24	
27	El Último Tour Del Mundo	Bad Bunny	2020–21	
26	Vuelve	Ricky Martin	1998–99	
24	Barrio Fino	Daddy Yankee	2004–05	
23	The Last	Aventura	2009–10	
20	Amor Prohibido	Selena	1994–95	
20	Los Dúo, Vol. 2	Juan Gabriel	2016–17	
19	Mi Reflejo	Christina Aguilera	2000–01	
17	Fijación Oral Vol. 1	Shakira	2005	
17	Formula, Vol. 1	Romeo Santos	2011–12	
17	Aura	Ozuna	2018	
16	Sex and Love	Enrique Iglesias	2014	
15	Vivir	Enrique Iglesias	1997	

=== Number-one year-end albums ===
The following list contains the number-one albums as determined by the year-end chart of the Top Latin Albums chart:

Year	Album	Artist(s)	label(s)	RIAA certification
1994	Mi Tierra	Gloria Estefan	Epic	16× Platinum (Latin)
1995	Dreaming of You	Selena	EMI Latin	62× Platinum (Latin)
1996	Dreaming of You	Selena	EMI Latin	62× Platinum (Latin)
1997	Tango	Julio Iglesias	Columbia	6× Platinum (Latin)
1998	Me Estoy Enamorando	Alejandro Fernández	Sony Discos	Platinum
1999	Vuelve	Ricky Martin	Sony Discos	Platinum
2000	Desde Un Principio: From the Beginning	Marc Anthony	RMM/Sony Discos	Gold
2001	Paulina	Paulina Rubio	Universal Music Latino	8× Platinum (Latin)
2002	Libre	Marc Anthony	Sony Discos	Gold
2003	Un Día Normal	Juanes	Surco/Universal Latino	6× Platinum (Latin)
2004	La Historia Continúa...	Marco Antonio Solís	Fonovisai	5× Platinum (Latin)
2005	Barrio Fino	Daddy Yankee	El Cartel/V.I.	Platinum
2006	Barrio Fino en Directo	Daddy Yankee	El Cartel/Interscope	Gold
2007	Celestial	RBD	EMI Televisa/Virgin	—N/a
2008	Los Extraterrestres	Wisin & Yandel	Machete	3× Platinum (Latin)
2009	The Last	Aventura	Strichcode/Premium Latin	4× Platinum (Latin)
2010	The Last	Aventura	Strichcode/Premium Latin	4× Platinum (Latin)
2011	Prince Royce	Prince Royce	Top Stop Music	3× Platinum (Latin)
2012	Formula, Vol. 1	Romeo Santos	Sony Music Latin	3× Platinum (Latin)
2013	La Misma Gran Señora	Jenni Rivera	Fonovisa Records	2× Platinum (Latin)
2014	Formula, Vol. 2	Romeo Santos	Sony Music Latin	11× Platinum (Latin)
2015	Los Dúo	Juan Gabriel	Universal Music Latino	Platinum (Latin)
2016	Los Dúo, Vol. 2	Juan Gabriel	Universal Music Latino	—N/a
2017	Fénix	Nicky Jam	Sony Music Latin	11× Platinum (Latin)
2018	Odisea	Ozuna	Dimelo Vi	16× Platinum (Latin)
2019	X100pre	Bad Bunny	Rimas Entertainment	10× Platinum (Latin)
2020	YHLQMDLG	Bad Bunny	Rimas Entertainment	24× Platinum (Latin)
2021	El Último Tour del Mundo	Bad Bunny	Rimas Entertainment	6× Platinum (Latin)
2022	Un Verano Sin Ti	Bad Bunny	Rimas Entertainment	—N/a
2023	Un Verano Sin Ti	Bad Bunny	Rimas Entertainment	—N/a
2024	Nadie Sabe Lo Que Va a Pasar Mañana	Bad Bunny	Rimas Entertainment	—N/a
2025	Debí Tirar Más Fotos	Bad Bunny	Rimas Entertainment	—N/a

=== Year-end charts ===
- Year-end chart of 2008
- Year-end chart of 2009

== See also ==
- List of best-selling Latin albums in the United States
- List of number-one Billboard Latin Albums from the 2020s
- Latin Pop Albums
- Regional Mexican Albums
- Tropical Albums
- Latin Rhythm Albums
- Hot Latin Songs
