= Fotos y Recuerdos =

Single by Selena

from the album Amor Prohibido
- B-side: "El Chico del Apartamento 512"
- Released: January 1995
- Studio: AMEN Studios (San Antonio, TX)
- Genre: Rock en español, house
- Length: 2:45
- Label: EMI Latin
- Songwriters: Chrissie Hynde, Ricky Vela
- Producers: A.B. Quintanilla, Bebu Silvetti

Selena singles chronology
| "No Me Queda Más" (1994) | "Fotos y Recuerdos" (1995) | "I Could Fall in Love" (1995) |

Audio
- "Fotos y Recuerdos" on YouTube

"Fotos y Recuerdos" (English: Pictures and Memories) is a song recorded by American recording artist Selena for her fourth studio album, Amor Prohibido (1994). It was released by EMI Latin in January 1995, as the fourth single. A cover version of the Pretenders' 1983 single "Back on the Chain Gang", "Fotos y Recuerdos" was written by Chrissie Hynde with Spanish-language lyrics by Ricky Vela. Lyrically, the song describes a lonely female protagonist who "kisses the photo of her [lover] each night before falling asleep."

"Fotos y Recuerdos" is a rock en español song with influences of dance pop and house music. The song garnered acclaim from music critics, with some even calling it an improvement over the Pretenders' original version. The song peaked at number one on the United States Billboard Hot Latin Songs chart for seven consecutive weeks, her fourth successive number one song. "Fotos y Recuerdos" also peaked at number one on the Regional Mexican Airplay chart, her second consecutive number one. "Fotos y Recuerdos" became Selena's first posthumous number one song, following the shooting death of the singer in March 1995. The recording became the second-most successful Latin single of 1995 and ranks as the twentieth best Hot Latin Songs chart single of all-time. Many musicians have since recorded the song and released it on their respective albums including Dominican salsa singer José Alberto "El Canario" and Mexican pop singer Paulina Rubio.

== Inspiration, production and songwriting controversy ==
While flying back from New York, A.B. Quintanilla—the brother-producer of Selena—heard the Pretenders' 1983 single "Back on the Chain Gang" on the radio. At the time, A.B. was having a nervous breakdown after realizing he was running out of material to record for Selena's fourth studio album, Amor Prohibido (1994). He likened the idea of reworking "Back on the Chain Gang" into a Spanish-language cumbia song. Keyboardist Ricky Vela wrote the Spanish lyrics into a cumbia-style that A.B. envisioned for the recording. The Amor Prohibido album was pressed for a release date of March 13, 1994, and was halted for distribution due to the copyrighting issues with "Fotos y Recuerdos". Vela retold in a 2002 interview how he was awakened by Selena and A.B. because they did not have the clearance for "Fotos y Recuerdos". Songwriter Chrissie Hynde's publishers reported the song to Hynde, who did not allow Selena to continue with "Fotos y Recuerdos" until she received an English-language translation of the new lyrics. It was only after Vela re-wrote the song into English that Hynde gave Selena the clearance for the recording. Musicologist James Perone noticed that the song was the shortest track off of Amor Prohibido. He further wrote how Vela "stripped some of the edge off of Hynde's text but retained the basic premise of ["Back on the Chain Gang"]" Perone found A.B.'s arrangement to be "an example of [his] universal Latin approach".

== Music, theme and lyrics ==
"Fotos y Recuerdos" is a mid-tempo cumbia song with influences of dance pop and house music. Cary Darling of The Buffalo News noticed the mixture of house and ranchera music in "Fotos y Recuerdos". Author and contributor to The New York Times, Joe Nick Patoski found the song to use the same melody as the Pretenders. Author Lori Beth Rodriguez also found similarities between the Pretenders' mainstream sound and "Fotos y Recuerdos" but noticed how the song echoed a cumbia undertone with "lyrics [that] are similar in theme, yet different from those in the original English version." The song features a synth-driven violin, ostinatish-percussion, and a steel drum under a cumbia beat. Perone found the song to have "small hints" of music found in Jamaica, Cuba, and Trinidad and Tobago. BuzzFeed contributor Brian Galindo, called the song "upbeat and dancy". Written in the key of D minor, the beat is set in common time and moves at a moderate 90 beats per minute. Rebecca Thatcher of the Austin American-Statesman, found the lyrical content of "Fotos y Recuerdos" to be a "lilting ode to a lost love". Lyrically, the song describes a lonely female protagonist who "kisses the photo of her [lover] each night before falling asleep."

== Critical reception ==
"Fotos y Recuerdos" garnered acclaim from music critics, some of whom called it an improvement over the Pretenders' original version, and called it one of Selena's most well-known recordings. According to author Pat Bar-Harrison, it was one of Selena's most successful United States singles. Writing for the San Antonio Express-News, Ramiro Burr called "Fotos y Recuerdos" an "interesting cover". The York Dispatch believed the song "outshines" all other tracks on the Amor Prohibido album. Author Ed Morales believed the song "has a lot of personality". Don McLeese of the Austin American-Statesman wrote how the song became a popular radio song in South Texas and believed it to be one of her signature songs. Musicologist Frank Hoffman, called it a "hard-edge rock" song. The Monitor editor Jon LaFollette, wrote differently; calling the song a "simultaneous effort to celebrate multiculturalism" in a way to "grow her bank account". Nonetheless, he listed the song as part of his "key tracks" for the Amor Prohibido album. Zach Quintance, also from The Monitor, wrote how readers of the newspaper chose Selena's 1994 single "No Me Queda Más" and "Fotos y Recuerdos"; citing that "fans loved the feeling and musicianship in those two songs." Federico Martinez of La Prensa, called the song an "enduring hit". Since its release, the song has been included on many music critics "best of Selena songs" list including the BuzzFeed (at number six), and Latina (at number eleven). In 2016, Rob Sheffield of Rolling Stone magazine included the song at number 47 in the list for the "50 Best Songs of the Nineties".

== Chart history ==
"Fotos y Recuerdos" was released in the week of January 28, 1995, serving as the fourth single released from Amor Prohibido. The track debuted on the U.S. Hot Latin Songs chart at number 29 on February 4, 1995. In its second week, the song jumped to number 12, receiving airpower honors. As a result, it subsequently debuted on the U.S. Regional Mexican Airplay chart at number ten. "Fotos y Recuerdos" rose to number two on the Hot Latin Songs and Regional Mexican Airplay charts, trailing Grupo Bronco's "Que No Me Olvide" by 557 Nielsen points on February 18, 1995. In the following week, "Fotos y Recuerdos" remained at number two on the Hot Latin Songs chart, while the single fell to number four on the Regional Mexican Airplay chart. In its fifth week, the song reclaimed the second position on the Regional Mexican Airplay chart, while remaining at number two for a third consecutive week on the Hot Latin Songs chart. Staying at number two for its fourth consecutive week on the Hot Latin Songs chart, "Fotos y Recuerdos" fell to number three on the Regional Mexican Airplay chart. The song fell to number three on the Hot Latin Songs chart, while it remained at number three on the Regional Mexican Airplay chart on March 18, 1995.

Selena was shot and killed by Yolanda Saldívar, her friend and former manager of the singer's Selena Etc. clothing boutiques, on March 31, 1995. At the time of her death, "Fotos y Recuerdos" was positioned at number four on the Hot Latin Songs chart. In the week following the singer's death, "Fotos y Recuerdos" peaked at number one on the Hot Latin Songs (her fourth consecutive) and Regional Mexican Airplay chart, her second consecutive. According to disc jockeys, "Fotos y Recuerdos" was the most requested song in South Texas throughout April of that year. In its second week atop the Hot Latin Songs and Regional Mexican Airplay charts, "Fotos y Recuerdos" debuted at number twelve on the U.S. Latin Pop Airplay chart. After two consecutive weeks at number one, "Fotos y Recuerdos" was dethroned on the Regional Mexican Airplay chart by La Mafia's "Toma Mi Amor". After spending seven consecutive weeks atop the Hot Latin Songs chart, "Fotos y Recuerdos" was displaced by Mexican group Los Bukis' single "Te Amo Mamá". "Fotos y Recuerdos" ended 1995 as the second most successful Latin single. Billboard magazine began monitoring digital downloads of Latin songs beginning with the week ending January 23, 2010. "Fotos y Recuerdos" made its debut on the Latin Pop Digital Songs chart following the twentieth anniversary of the singer's death; positioned at number 19. Over at the Regional Mexican Digital Songs chart, the song debuted and peaked at number 14.

== Cover versions ==
Dominican salsa singer José Alberto "El Canario" covered the song for the tribute album Familia RMM Recordando a Selena (1996). Mexican mariachi group Banda El Grullo recorded the track for their album 30 Números 1 en Banda. His version peaked at #15 on the Tropical Songs chart. Mexican group Liberación recorded the song for the tribute album Mexico Recuerda a Selena (2005). Mexican singer Gerardo Williams covered the song for his album Nuevas Voces de América. Mexican pop singer Paulina Rubio performed and recorded "Fotos y Recuerdos" for the live televised tribute concert Selena ¡VIVE! in April 2005. Michael Clark of the Houston Chronicle wrote that Rubio used her "sex appeal" while performing the song. Ramiro Burr of the San Antonio Express-News called Rubio's version a "techno/hip-hop number". Rubio performed "Fotos y Recuerdos" once more during her tour in Texas that same year.

== Credits and personnel ==
Credits adapted from Amor Prohibido liner notes.

- Selena – vocals
- Joe Ojeda – electronic keyboard
- Ricky Vela – writer, keyboards
- Chris Pérez – electric guitar
- Suzette Quintanilla – drums
- A.B. Quintanilla III – bass guitar, producer
- Pete Astudillo – tambourine
- Eliza Howardson - violin
- Lisette Lorenzo – art direction

== Charts ==
=== Weekly charts ===
| Chart (1995) | Peak position |
|---|---|
| US Hot Latin Songs (Billboard) | 1 |
| US Regional Mexican Airplay (Billboard) | 1 |
| US Latin Pop Airplay (Billboard) | 12 |

=== Year-end charts ===
| Chart (1995) | Peak position |
|---|---|
| US Hot Latin Tracks (Billboard) | 2 |

=== All-time charts ===
| Chart (2016) | Position |
|---|---|
| US Hot Latin Songs (Billboard) | 37 |

== Certifications ==
| Region | Certification | Certified units/sales |
|---|---|---|
| United States (RIAA) | Platinum (Latin) | 60,000^{‡} |
^{‡} Sales+streaming figures based on certification alone.

== See also ==
- Latin music in the United States
- Billboard Top Latin Songs Year-End Chart
- List of number-one Billboard Hot Latin Tracks of 1995

== Notes ==
- Perone, James E. (2012). The Album: A Guide to Pop Music's Most Provocative, Influential, and Important Creations. ABC-CLIO. ISBN 978-0313379079.
- Hoffman, Frank (2005). Encyclopedia of Recorded Sound. Routledge. ISBN 1135949506.
- Patoski, Joe Nick (1996). Selena: Como La Flor. Boston: Little Brown and Company. ISBN 0-316-69378-2.
- Rodriguez, Lori Beth (2008). Mapping Tejana Epistemologies. ISBN 978-0549510611.
- Shaw, Tucker (2007). The Hookup Artist. Harper Collins. ISBN 978-0060756208.
- Morales, Ed (2006). Ritmo Latino. Ma Non Troppo. ISBN 8496222470.
- Kearney, Milo; Medrano, Manuel (2001). Medieval culture and the Mexican American borderlands. Texas A&M Univ. Press. ISBN 1585441325.
- Barr-Harrison, Pat (1996). Juntos. Prentice-Hall. ISBN 0134155718.
