= Top Latin Albums Year-End Chart =

Record chart

The Billboard Top Latin albums chart, published in Billboard magazine, is a record chart that features Latin music sales information. This data is compiled by Nielsen SoundScan from a sample that includes music stores, music departments at electronics and department stores, Internet sales (both physical and digital) and verifiable sales from concert venues in the United States.

== Top Latin Albums Year-End Chart of 2008 ==
Unlike the List of number-one Billboard Top Latin Albums of 2008, the year-end chart on Billboard Magazine is a compilation of feature recaps throughout the year. The rankings for this chart reflect airplay or sales during the weeks that titles appeared on the respective lists during the tracking period. This includes activity during unpublished weeks for those lists that print every other week. The 2008 chart year began on the issue dated on December 1, 2006, and ended with the November 29, 2008, issue.

The best selling Latin album of 2008 was Los Extraterrestres by Wisin & Yandel, which also won the Latin Grammy Award for Best Urban Music Album. Mexican performer Vicente Fernández ranked two albums within the Top 10, Para Siempre at number 2, and Historia de Un Idolo, Vol. 1 at number 10. Marco Antonio Solís was the performer with most albums in the list: La Mejor... Colección, No Molestar and Una Noche en Madrid.

Rank	Album	Artist	Peak Top Latin Albums	Peak Billboard 200
1	Rebelde	RBD	1	14
2	Para Siempre	Vicente Fernández	1	36
3	La Mejor... Colección	Marco Antonio Solís	2	92
4	Te Quiero	Flex	1	70
5	95/08	Enrique Iglesias	1	18
6	Nuestro Amor	RBD	3	97
7	Todo Cambió	Camila	1	76
8	La Vida... Es un Ratico	Juanes	1	13
9	Capaz de Todo Por Tí	K-Paz de la Sierra	1	93
10	Historia de Un Idolo, Vol. 1	Vicente Fernández	1	81

== Top Latin Albums Year-End Chart of 2010 ==
Unlike the List of number-one Billboard Latin Albums from the 2010s, the year-end chart on Billboard Magazine is a compilation of feature recaps throughout the year. The rankings for this chart reflect airplay or sales during the weeks that titles appeared on the respective lists during the tracking period. This includes activity during unpublished weeks for those lists that print every other week.

The best selling Latin album of 2010 was The Last by Aventura. Enrique Iglesias's Euphoria ranked at number-two within the Top 10.

Rank	Album	Artist	Peak Top Latin Albums	Peak Billboard 200
1	The Last	Aventura	1	5
2	Euphoria	Enrique Iglesias	1	10
3	Iconos	Marc Anthony	1	11
4	Dejarte de Amar	Camila	1	64
5	La Revolución	Wisin & Yandel	1	7
6	Sale el Sol	Shakira	1	7
7	La Gran Señora	Jenni Rivera	2	171
8	No Hay Imposibles	Chayanne	1	23
9	Amarte a la Antigua	Pedro Fernández	2	141
10	En Vivo Desde Culiacan	Larry Hernandez	2	-
