= Jowell & Randy discography =

- Studio albums: 4
- Singles: 23
- Music videos: 43
- Mixtapes: 5
- Featured singles: 12

Joel Muñoz Martinez (born March 3, 1982) and Randy Ariel Ortiz Acevedo (born July 16, 1983), best known as Jowell & Randy, is a reggaeton duo from San Juan, Puerto Rico. They met in 2000 and began working as a duo a year later, reaching international success in 2007 as members of Casa de Leones alongside compatriot rappers J King & Maximan and Guelo Star. Jowell & Randy's first studio album as duo, Los Más Sueltos del Reggaetón, was released in December 2007 under Warner Music Group and White Lion Records, a record label founded by Elías de Leon, one of reggaeton's most respected producers. However, their most successful album was El Momento, released in May 2010 under Wisin & Yandel's WY Records. It achieved the duo's highest debut on Billboard's Top Latin Albums chart, peaking at number 2 and charting for 12 weeks. Three years later, they released their third and yet last studio album, Sobredoxis, which debuted at number-one on Billboard's Latin Rhythm Albums chart. After that, the duo went to underground reggaeton, supporting new acts and serving as executive producers to their respective albums. The duo also released four non-successful mixtapes between 2010 and 2016: Tengan Paciencia, Pre-Doxis, Under Doxis and La Alcaldía del Perreo. During their career, Jowell & Randy performed different music genres, including reggaeton, underground reggaeton, reggae, latin pop, dancehall, pop rock and tribal.

After their rise to international notoriety, the duo managed to perform in various European countries, including France, Germany, Italy, Netherlands, Spain and Switzerland. They became the first reggaeton acts to perform in Australia and Monaco, where they served as special guests by Prince Albert II and Princess Caroline in 2016. As duo, their most commercially successful single is 2010's "Loco", managing to appear on five Billboard Latin charts and receiving a Billboard Latin Music Award nomination as artists for the song's performance on the Tropical Airplay chart. Their most popular music video on YouTube is the 2013 remix version of "Hey Mister", with more than 75 million views. Their discography consists of four studio albums, five mixtapes, twenty-three singles and forty-three music videos.

== Albums ==
=== Studio albums ===
Title	Album details	Peak chart positions			Certifications (sales thresholds)
Title	Album details	US	US Latin	MEX	Certifications (sales thresholds)
Casa de Leones (as Casa de Leones)	Released: June 26, 2007; Label: Warner, White Lion; Format: CD, digital download	126	3	—	RIAA: Platinum (Latin)
Los Más Sueltos del Reggaetón	Released: December 18, 2007; Label: Warner, White Lion; Format: CD, digital download	—	42	—	RIAA: Gold (Latin)
El Momento	Released: May 4, 2010; Label: WY, White Lion; Format: CD, digital download	112	2	53	
Sobredoxis	Released: June 4, 2013; Label: White Lion; Format: CD, digital download	—	10	—	
Viva el Perreo	Released: August 6, 2020; Label: Rimas Entertainment; Format: CD, digital download	159	5	—	RIAA: Gold (Latin)
Viva la Musik	Released: June 20, 2024; Label: Rimas Entertainment; Format: CD, digital download	—	—	—	

=== Mixtapes ===
- 2010: Tengan Paciencia
- 2012: Pre-Doxis
- 2013: El Imperio Nazza: Doxis Edition
- 2014: Under Doxis
- 2016: La Alcaldía del Perreo

== Singles ==
=== As lead artists ===
Title	Year	Peak chart positions							Certifications	Album
Title	Year	US Bub.	US Latin	US Trop.	CHI	COL	MEX	SPA	Certifications	Album
"Agresivo" (featuring Arcángel)	2006	—	(Note: "Agresivo" did not enter the Billboard Hot Latin Songs chart but peaked on the Latin Rhythm Airplay chart at number 27.)	—	—	—	—	—		La Calle, Vol. 1
"No Te Veo" (as Casa de Leones)	2007	—	4	2	—	—	—	—		Casa de Leones
"Shorty" (as Casa de Leones)	2007	—	(Note: "Shorty" did not enter the Billboard Hot Latin Songs chart but peaked on the Latin Rhythm Airplay chart at number 16.)	—	—	—	—	—		Casa de Leones
"Un Poco Loca" (featuring De La Ghetto)	2007	—	—	—	—	—	—	—		Los Más Sueltos del Reggaetón
"Let's Do It"	2008	—	32	—	—	—	—	—		Los Más Sueltos del Reggaetón
"Loco"	2010	—	22	3	—	—	—	—		El Momento
"Goodbye"	2010	—	—	—	—	—	—	—		El Momento
"Un Booty Nuevo" (featuring Yaviah)	2010	—	—	—	—	—	—	—		El Momento
"Mi Dama de Colombia"	2010	—	—	—	—	—	—	—		El Momento
"Solo Por Ti" (featuring Cultura Profética)	2010	—	—	—	—	—	—	—		El Momento
"Perréame"	2011	—	—	—	—	—	—	—		Una Nota Con Elegancia
"Ragga Dub"	2012	—	—	—	—	—	—	—		Sobredoxis
"Sobredoxis"	2012	—	—	—	—	—	—	—		Sobredoxis
"El Funeral de la Canoa"	2012	—	—	—	—	—	—	—		Pre-Doxis
"Sobredosis de Amor"	2013	—	—	—	—	—	—	—		Sobredoxis
"Báilalo A Lo Loco" (featuring 3Ball MTY)	2013	—	(Note: "Báilalo A Lo Loco" did not enter the Billboard Hot Latin Songs chart but peaked on the Latin Rhythm Airplay chart at number 12.)	—	—	—	—	—		Sobredoxis
"Las Nenas Lindas"	2014	—	(Note: "Las Nenas Lindas" did not enter the Billboard Hot Latin Songs chart but peaked on the Latin Rhythm Airplay chart at number 18.)	—	—	—	—	—		Sobredoxis
"Living in Your World"	2014	—	(Note: "Living in Your World" did not enter the Billboard Hot Latin Songs chart but peaked on the Latin Rhythm Airplay chart at number 18.)	—	—	—	—	—		Sobredoxis
"Pa' Los Moteles"	2014	—	—	—	—	—	—	—		Under Doxis
"Lo Que Quiero"	2014	—	(Note: "Lo Que Quiero" did not enter the Billboard Hot Latin Songs chart but peaked on the Latin Rhythm Airplay chart at number 11.)	—	—	—	—	—		Under Doxis
"Vamo' A Busal"	2014	—	—	—	—	—	—	—		Under Doxis
"Guadalupe"	2016	—	—	—	—	—	—	—		La Alcaldía del Perreo
"Bonita" (with J Balvin)	2017	23	27	—	14	9	1	8		Non-album singles
"Dile la Verdad" (with Manuel Turizo)	2019	—	—	—	—	—	—	88	RIAA: 2× Platinum (Latin)	Non-album singles
"Anaranjado" (with J Balvin)	2020	—	31	—	—	—	—	—		Viva el Perreo
"ID" (with Young Miko)	2023	—	—	—	—	—	—	—	RIAA: Platinum (Latin)	Att.

=== Other charted songs ===
Title	Year	Peak chart positions		Album
Title	Year	US Latin Rhythm Airplay	US Latin Rhythm Digital	Album
"Agresivo II"	2007	35	—	Los Más Sueltos del Reggaetón
"Suave y Lento" (featuring Wisin, Tico El Inmigrante and Franco El Gorila)	2010	—	21	El Momento
"Mucha Soltura" (featuring Daddy Yankee)	2013	13	—	El Imperio Nazza: Doxis Edition

=== Featured charting singles ===
Title	Year	Peak chart positions		Album
Title	Year	US Latin	US Tropical	Album
"Pónmela" (with Julio Voltio)	2007	41	—	En Lo Claro
"Stripper (Remix)" (with La Sista)	2008	(Note: "Stripper (Remix)" did not enter the Billboard Hot Latin Songs chart but peaked on the Latin Rhythm Airplay chart at number 34.)	—	Non-album single
"Ya No Existen Detalles" (with Naldo)	2008	(Note: "Ya No Existen Detalles" did not enter the Billboard Hot Latin Songs chart but peaked on the Latin Rhythm Airplay chart at number 30.)	—	Lágrimas de Sangre
"Impresióname" (with Tempo)	2009	(Note: "Impresióname" did not enter the Billboard Hot Latin Songs chart but peaked on the Latin Rhythm Airplay chart at number 17.)	20	Free Tempo
"Iglesia del Perreo" (with Juno)	2010	(Note: "Iglesia del Perreo" did not enter the Billboard Hot Latin Songs chart but peaked on the Latin Rhythm Airplay chart at number 31.)	—	The Hitmaker
"La Cita" (with Zion & Lennox)	2010	(Note: "La Cita" did not enter the Billboard Hot Latin Songs chart but peaked on the Latin Rhythm Airplay chart at number 16.)	—	Los Verdaderos
"Sin Compromiso (Remix)" (with J Balvin)	2010	(Note: "Sin Compromiso (Remix)" did not enter the Billboard Hot Latin Songs chart but peaked on the Latin Rhythm Airplay chart at number 16.)	18	Chosen Few Urbano: El Journey
"Ella Lo Que Quiere Es Salsa" (with Victor Manuelle and Julio Voltio)	2012	29	1	Busco Un Pueblo
"Pa' La Pared" (with Cosculluela)	2014	(Note: "Pa' La Pared" did not enter the Billboard Hot Latin Songs chart but peaked on the Latin Rhythm Airplay chart at number 20.)	—	Santa Cos
"Bella Que Que" (with R.K.M.)	2014	(Note: "Bella Que Que" did not enter the Billboard Hot Latin Songs chart but peaked on the Latin Rhythm Airplay chart at number 23.)	—	Diferente
"She Likes My Reggae" (with Gomba Jahbari)	2014	(Note: "She Likes My Reggae" did not enter the Billboard Hot Latin Songs chart but peaked on the Latin Rhythm Airplay chart at number 20.)	—	Qué Lindo Es Puerto
"Lentamente" (with J Álvarez and Zion & Lennox)	2014	(Note: "Lentamente" did not enter the Billboard Hot Latin Songs chart but peaked on the Latin Rhythm Airplay chart at number 19.)	—	De Camino Pa' La Cima: Reloaded

== Music videos ==
=== Lead ===
Title	Other performer(s)	Album	Year
"Todavía Recuerdo"		The Majestic	2002
"Yo Soy"		Kilates 2: Segundo Impacto	2003
"Síguelo Bailando Solita"		El Draft	2005
"Agresivo"	Arcángel	La Calle, Vol. 1	2006
"No Te Veo"	J King & Maximan; Guelo Star	Casa de Leones	2007
"Shorty"		Casa de Leones	2007
"Un Poco Loca"	De La Ghetto	Los Más Sueltos del Reggaetón	2007
"Let's Do It"		Los Más Sueltos del Reggaetón	2008
"Loco"		El Momento	2010
"Loco" (Remix)	Wisin & Yandel	Non-album single (Note: The song was scheduled to be included on El Momento 2, a re-issue of El Momento based on remix versions of the album's tracks. The idea was scrapped after a suggestion of Wisin, co-founder of WY Records, label with which Jowell & Randy signed.)	2010
"Un Booty Nuevo"	Yaviah	El Momento	2010
"Mi Dama de Colombia"		El Momento	2010
"El Parrandón"	Julio César Sanabria; Divino	Non-album single	2010
"Goodbye"		El Momento	2011
"Dile a Él (Salsa Version)"	N'Klabe	Non-album single	2011
"Mi Dama de Colombia" (Remix)	Pipe Bueno; Pipe Calderón; J Balvin	Non-album single	2011
"Solo Por Ti"	Cultura Profética	El Momento	2011
"Perréame"		Una Nota Con Elegancia	2011
"Perréame" (Remix)	Jenny La Sexy Voz	Chosen Few Urbano: El Journey	2011
"Ragga Dub"		Sobredoxis	2012
"A Guayar To To"		A Lo Under, Vol. 2: Zona de Perreo	2012
"Sobredoxis"		Sobredoxis	2012
"El Funeral de la Canoa"		Pre-Doxis	2012
"Sobredosis de Amor"		Sobredoxis	2013
"Hey Mister" (Remix)	Falo; Los Pepe; Mr. Black; Watussi	Back To The Underground	2013
"Bellaco Con Bellaca"	Ñengo Flow	El Imperio Nazza: Doxis Edition	2013
"Chulo Sin H"	De La Ghetto	El Imperio Nazza: Doxis Edition	2013
"Báilalo A Lo Loco"	3BallMTY	Sobredoxis	2013
"Las Nenas Lindas"		Sobredoxis	2014
"Living In Your World"		Sobredoxis	2014
"Prendan Los Motores"	Farruko	Sobredoxis	2014
"Lo Que Quiero"		Under Doxis	2014
"Vamo' A Busal"		Under Doxis	2015
"Pa' Los Moteles"		Under Doxis	2015
"Ya No Sale El Sol" (Remix)	La Materialista; Wiso G	Non-album single	2015
"Perreo Sólido"		Orion	2015
"Guadalupe"		La Alcaldía del Perreo	2016
"La Pista Revienta"		La Alcaldía del Perreo	2016
"Me Prefieren"	Ñengo Flow	La Alcaldía del Perreo	2016
"Regreso"	J King & Maximan; Guelo Star	TBA	2016
"Bomba Para Afincar"		De Puerto Rico Para El Mundo	2016
"Isla del Encanto"		Sobredoxis	2017
"Guadalupe" (Remix)	Mr. Williamz	La Alcaldía del Perreo	2017
"Posición 4"		La Alcaldía del Perreo	2017
"Bonita"	J Balvin	Viva La Musik	2017

=== Featured ===
Title	Other performer(s)	Album	Year
"Siente El Boom" (Remix)	Tito El Bambino; De La Ghetto	Non-album single	2007
"Pónmela"	Julio Voltio	En Lo Claro	2007
"Hola Bebé"	Héctor el Father	The Bad Boy: The Most Wanted Edition	2007
"¿Qué Tengo Que Hacer? (Remix)"	Daddy Yankee	Non-album single	2008
"Ya No Existen Detalles"	Naldo	Lágrimas de Sangre	2008
"Stripper" (Remix)	La Sista	Non-album single	2008
"Fuera del Planeta" (Remix)	Eloy; Zion	The One Dollar Mixtape	2008
"Entonces Está Bien"	L.D.A.	Chosen Few III: The Movie	2008
"Tú Te Las Traes" (Remix)	Yomo; Ñejo & Dálmata; Julio Voltio	My Destiny	2008
"¿Por Qué Estás Sola?"	Pipe Calderón	Se Lleva En La Sangre	2009
"Cositas Macabras" (Remix)	Gadiel	Non-album single	2009
"Descará 2"	Yomo; Guelo Star; Chyno Nyno	The Road to My Destiny	2009
"El Cuero"	R-1	La Franquicia	2009
"Sin Compromiso" (Remix)	J Balvin	Chosen Few Urbano: El Journey	2010
"Triple X"	De La Ghetto	Mi Movimiento	2011
"Latin Girl" (Remix)	Jenny La Sexy Voz; Omega El Fuerte; Cosculluela; De La Ghetto	Chosen Few Urbano: El Journey	2011
"Ella Lo Que Quiere Es Salsa"	Victor Manuelle; Julio Voltio	Busco Un Pueblo	2012
"¿Qué Hiciste Tú?"	Dubosky	Non-album single	2012
"Amor de Bandidos" (Remix)	Dubosky; Freddy	Una Nota Con Elegancia	2012
"Ay"	Amara La Negra; Fuego; Negro 5 Estrellas; Los Pepe; Ricky Lindo	Non-album single	2013
"Chalalo"	O.G. Black	Back To The Underground: Francotirador Edition	2013
"Dale Pa'l Piso" (Remix)	Watussi; Ñengo Flow	La Revelación del Under	2013
"Cómodo" (Remix)	Oma 206	Oma El Del 206	2013
"Mucho Under"	Polaco; O.G. Black; Frankie Boy; Maicol & Manuel; Falo; Watussi; Don Chezina	Back To The Underground: Polakan Edition	2014
"Llueven Los Bootys" (Remix)	Polaco; El Mayor Clásico	Back To The Underground: Polakan Edition	2014
"Pa' La Pared"	Cosculluela	Teflon Face	2014
"Te La Gua Deja' Pisá"	El Alfa	Non-album single	2014
"Verano Extremo"	Los Teke Teke; Black Jonas Point; La Nueva Escuela; Vakero; Amara La Negra; Sensato; Melymel; David Kada; Los Pepe; Secreto	Non-album single	2014
"Ando" (Remix)	Maicol & Manuel; Secreto	Back To The Underground: Yakaliando Edition	2014
"Mi Cumpleaños" (Remix)	Watussi; O.G. Black; El Alfa	Under Doxis	2014
"Suelten Pistolas"	Tony Lenta; Cosculluela	Under Doxis	2014
"Nací Para Amarte"	Ivy Queen	Vendetta: First Round	2014
"Cómo Baila"	Xavi The Destroyer	Proyecto X	2014
"Me Gustas Tanto"	White Noise & D-Anel	Non-album single	2016

== Album appearances ==
Year	Title	Album
2002	"Todavía Recuerdo"	The Majestic
2003	"Yo Soy"	Kilates 2: Segundo Impacto
2003	"Quieres Que Te Queme"	Time 2 Kill 2
2003	"Quiero Volverte A Ver"	Pocos Elegidos
2003	"Te Buscaré Esta Noche"	Los Intocables
2004	"Delirando Pero Vacilando"	Chosen Few: El Documental
2004	"No Quiero Guillaera" (with LDA)	Chosen Few: El Documental
2004	"Liga No Dan"	The Majestic 2: Segundo Imperio
2004	"Bailoteándolo"	Alterando La Paz
2005	"Síguelo" (with Maicol & Manuel)	El Desquite
2005	"Síguelo Bailando Solita"	El Draft
2005	"Nalgona"	Guatauba Guatagatos
2005	"Ya Llegó La Hora"	The Crew 4: Cruzando El Charco
2006	"Gata Peligrosa" (with Kino Rankins)	A Otro Nivel
2006	"Agresivo" (with Arcángel)	La Calle, Vol. 1
2006	"Ella Sola Viene"	Comenzó La Acción
2006	"Dos Palgas"	Sandunga Music
2006	"No Voy A Parar"	Chosen Few II: El Documental
2006	"Pártelo"	No Mercy
2006	"Te Voy A Encender"	K-Libre
2007	"Pónmela" (with Julio Voltio)	En Lo Claro
2007	"Cuarto Nivel" (with Zion)	The Perfect Melody
2007	"Hola Bebé" (with Héctor el Father)	The Bad Boy: The Most Wanted Edition
2007	"La Soledad"	Flow La Discoteka 2
2007	"Mala Es"	El Pentágono
2007	"Si Tú Quieres Bailar"	Guatauba University
2007	"No Juegues Más"	Invasión
2007	"Los Capos" (with Héctor el Father, Julio Voltio, Ñejo & Dálmata, Zion, Syko and De La Ghetto)	Los Capos
2007	"Sé Que Te Tengo Mal"	Los Capos
2008	"Ya No Existen Detalles" (with Naldo)	Lágrimas de Sangre
2008	"No Me Celen"	Los Sikarios
2008	"Entonces Está Bien" (with LDA)	Chosen Few III: The Movie
2008	"Se Te Puede Sentir" (with KC Melody)	Los Mariachis
2008	"Pártela" (with Trebol Clan)	The Producers
2008	"Tú Te Las Traes (Remix)" (with Yomo, Ñejo & Dálmata and Julio Voltio)	My Destiny
2009	"¿Por Qué Estás Sola?" (with Pipe Calderón)	Se Lleva En La Sangre
2009	"Impresióname" (with Tempo)	Free Tempo
2009	"Descará 2" (with Yomo, Guelo Star and Chyno Nyno)	The Road to My Destiny
2009	"El Cuero" (with R-1)	La Franquicia
2009	"En El Pensamiento" (with Cosculluela)	El Príncipe
2009	"Qué Lo Qué (Remix)" (with J Álvarez)	El Dueño del Sistema
2010	"Iglesia del Perreo" (with Juno)	The Hitmaker
2010	"Gracias a la Suegra" (with JQ)	Under Underrr, Vol. 1
2010	"Volvieron Los Cinco" (as Casa de Leones)	Los Superhéroes
2010	"La Cita" (with Zion & Lennox)	Los Verdaderos
2010	"Sin Compromiso (Remix)" (with J Balvin)	Chosen Few Urbano: El Journey
2011	"Perréame" (with Wisin & Yandel)	Los Vaqueros: El Regreso
2011	"Triple X" (with De La Ghetto)	Mi Movimiento
2011	"Latin Girl (Remix)" (with Jenny La Sexy Voz, Omega El Fuerte, Cosculluela and De La Ghetto)	Chosen Few Urbano: El Journey
2011	"Perréame (Remix)" (with Jenny La Sexy Voz)	Chosen Few Urbano: El Journey
2011	"Fórmula Perfecta"	Armados y Peligrosos
2012	"Ella Lo Que Quiere Es Salsa" (with Victor Manuelle and Julio Voltio)	Busco Un Pueblo
2012	"No Me La Compares (Remix)" (with Galante and Zion & Lennox)	Tu Juguetito Sexual
2012	"Déjala Caer" (with Guelo Star)	The Movie Man
2012	"A Guayar To To"	A Lo Under, Vol. 2: Zona de Perreo
2012	"HP (Remix)" (with Alexis & Fido and Luigi 21 Plus)	Wild Dogz: La Corporación
2013	"Hey Mister (Remix)" (with Falo, Los Pepe, Mr. Black, Watussi)	Back To The Underground
2013	"Vinimos A Joder" (with Pacho & Cirilo)	Los Dueños de la Calle
2013	"Chalalo" (with OG Black)	Back To The Underground: Francotirador Edition
2013	"Le Damos Pa'l Piso" (with Watussi and Baby Rasta)	La Revelación del Under
2013	"Dale Pa'l Piso (Remix)" (with Watussi and Ñengo Flow)	La Revelación del Under
2013	"El Gallo y la Gallina" (with Limi-T)	Party and Dance
2013	"Cómodo (Remix)" (with Oma 206)	Oma El Del 206
2013	"Si No Quema, No Chicha" (with Frankie Boy)	Back To The Underground: Frankie Edition
2014	"Entre El Novio y El Pollo" (with Akim)	El Pollo del Mes
2014	"Mucho Under" (with Polaco, OG Black, Frankie Boy, Maicol & Manuel, Falo, Watussi and Don Chezina)	Back To The Underground: Polakan Edition
2014	"Llueven Los Bootys (Remix)" (with Polaco and El Mayor Clásico)	Back To The Underground: Polakan Edition
2014	"Pa' La Pared" (with Cosculluela)	Teflon Face
2014	"Ya No Sale El Sol" (with Wiso G)	Back To The Underground: Wiso G Edition
2014	"Bella Que Que" (with R.K.M.)	Diferente
2014	"Ando (Remix)" (with Maicol & Manuel and Secreto)	Back To The Underground: Yakaliando Edition
2014	"She Likes My Reggae" (with Gomba Jahbari)	Qué Lindo Es Puerto Rico
2014	"Lentamente" (with J Álvarez and Zion & Lennox)	De Camino Pa' La Cima: Reloaded
2014	"Nací Para Amarte" (with Ivy Queen)	Vendetta: First Round
2014	"Cómo Baila" (with Xavi The Destroyer)	Proyecto X
2015	"La Vecina" (with Guelo Star)	The Movie Under
2015	"Perreo Sólido"	Orion
2015	"Bambúa (Remix)" (with J King & Maximan)	Volvieron Los Rastrilleros: Preloaded
2016	"Regreso" (as Casa de Leones)	TBA
2016	"Bomba Para Afincar"	De Puerto Rico Para El Mundo
2023	"Yoshi" (with Arcángel and De La Ghetto)	Sentimiento, Elegancia y Más Maldad
