= White Lion Records =

Latin music record label

- Founded: 1994; 32 years ago
- Founder: Elias de León
- Genre: Reggaeton, Latin, Urbano
- Country of origin: Puerto Rico

White Lion Records is a reggaeton, Latin Music, Latín reggae and urbano record label established by Elías de León with the release of the album No Mercy by Daddy Yankee in 1995. The label would temporarily change its name to 'Boricua Guerrero' from 1996-2001 until reestablishing as White Lion Records with the releases of Maicol y Manuel's "Como En Los Tiempos De Antes" and the compilation "Planet Reggae" in 2002. As an independent label in 2003, it was selling over 100,000 copies of Tego Calderon's most recent album at the time; it soon after signed a distribution deal with Sony BMG.

White Lion is an issuer of Puerto Rican hip hop, reggaeton, Latin reggae & urbano. The company and its founder Elias de León were first to discover and release material from future reggaeton stars such as Daddy Yankee, Calle 13, Eddie Dee, Mexicano 777 and Tego Calderon. They have released albums like "Calle 13" and "Los De Atras Vienen Conmigo" by Calle 13, "El Abayarde" by Tego Calderon and "El Principe" by Cosculluela. The label is also affiliated with subsidiary imprints "Black Lion", "Nueva Kamada Corp", "Young Lion" and 'Full Metal Enterprise'.

In 2020, Elias intervened in the controversy between Cosculluela and Residente, both members of White Lion, preventing them from releasing diss tracks against each other.

== History ==
Elías de León has been at the forefront of the Latino urban movement since its first launch in 1997. His musical taste and vision have been an intrinsic part of the birth of the Latino urban scene.

His first foray was with the launch of a "various artists" in the 90's where new artists like "Playero" and Daddy Yankee emerged.

In the mid-'90s, De León began his career as an executive producer for his signature “White Lion” and produced Daddy Yankee's debut album, “No Mercy” (1995). A year later, he released the album "White Lion-Rap Reggae All Stars", which gave way to a handful of new talents such as Maicol and Manuel, Don Chezina, Rey Pirín and the Mansion Crew-formed by Alberto Style and Nico Canada.

With the release of "Boricua Guerrero: First Combat", he created the first musical project that featured the sound of reggaeton and was the first to combine Anglo and Puerto Rican talent. Among the US rappers featured on the album were Busta Rhymes, Nas, Lost Boys, Q-Tip, Fat Joe and Big Pun. For Puerto Rico, the singers who participated were Daddy Yankee, Eddie Dee, Héctor "El Father", Tito "El Bambino", Don Chezina, Rey Pirín, Yaviah, Maicol & Manuel and Alberto Stylee.

Elias de León as Executive Producer of his label "White Lion Records" has released albums from artists like Calle 13, who to date has won 24 Grammy's, Tego Calderón, Julio Voltio, Jowell & Randy, Cosculluela, Los Leones, Nico Canada, J King & Maximan, John Eric, and Zion & Lennox.

Currently “White Lion Records” is once again redefining the sound of urban music in Spanish with artists like: Álvaro Díaz whose next release is part of the progressive Spanish hip hop movement. Brray, Joyce Santana and Young Martino are others. La Tribu de Abrante considered a cultural project that challenges percussion progressions of the Bomba genre of Puerto Rico and is presented in a contemporary way to the millennial demographic, IZAAK, a millennial pop talent currently working on his solo album.

== Artists ==
- Jowell & Randy
- Wiso G
- Maicol y Manuel
- Live Music
- Falo
- Omar Garcia
- Gomba Jahbari
- La Tribu De Abrante
- PJ Sin Suela
- Brray

=== Former artists ===
- Daddy Yankee
- Tego Calderon
- Zion y Lennox
- Julio Voltio
- Arcángel
- Master Joe
- Nico Canada
- Cosculluela
- Calle 13
- Guelo Star
- Darell
- Yomo
- Álvaro Díaz
- Nicky Jam
- Farina
- Residente
- Lisa M

=== Former Artists Under Boricua Guerrero Imprint ===
- Eddie Dee
- Playero DJ
- Maicol y Manuel

== Discography from White Lion and Boricua Guerrero ==
- Daddy Yankee - "No Mercy" (1995)
- Master Joe - "Welcome To My Kingdom" (1995)
- Frankie Boy - "Oh My God Se Pasó De La Raya" (1995)
- White Lion - "Rap Reggae All Stars" (1995) *Various Artists
- Playero DJ y Nico Canada - "Boricua Guerrero E.P" (1996) *Various Artists
- Boricua Guerrero: First Combat (1997) *Various Artists*
- Mision 1: Ra (CD 1)
- Mision 2: Reggaeton (CD 2) - * later released separately due to some audiences in Puerto Rico preferring Reggaeton rhythms over hip hop.
- Mexicano 777 - "Entre El Bien Y El Mal" (1998)
- Eddie Dee - "Amor Mio" Maxi Single (1998)
- Maicol y Manuel - "Los Reyes Del Underground" (1999)
- Eddie Dee "El Terrorista De La Lirica" (2000)
- Mexicano 777 "El Colmo De Los Fugitivos" (2001)
- Maestro "The Movie" (2001)
- Maicol y Manuel "Como En Los Tiempos De Antes" (2001)
- Boricua Guerrero "Greatest Hits" (2002) *various artists*
- Planet Reggae (2002) *Various Artists*
- Tego Calderon - "El Abayarde" (2002)
- Nicky Jam - "Salon De La Fama" (2003)
- Maestro - Special Request (2003)
- Tego Calderon - "El Enemy De Los Guasibiri" (2004)
- Zion y Lennox - "Motivando A La Yal" (2004)
- Julio Voltio - "Voltage AC" (2004)
- John Eric - "El Peso Completo" (2005)
- White Lion - Greatest Hits vol. 1 (2005) *various artists*
- Zion y Lennox "Motivando A La Yal: Special Edition" (2005)
- Calle 13 - *self titled debut* (2005)
- Julio Voltio - "Voltio" (2005)
- La Calle vol. 1 (2006) *various artists*
- Reggaeton Rulers (2006) *various artists*
- Calle 13 - "Residente o Visitante" (2007) Elías de León Served as Executive Producer
- Casa De Leones - "Self Titled" (2007)
- Julio Voltio - "En Lo Claro" (2007)
- Tego Calderon - "El Abayarde Contraataca" (2007)
- Jowell & Randy - "Los Mas Sueltos Del Reggaeton" (2007)
- Arcángel - "La Maravilla" 'original version' (2008)

(Shelved by Sony Latin when executives of the label believed the album had no commercial potential. Elias De Leon would eventually sell the contract of Arcángel and album rights to Luny Tunes and their company "Mas Flow Inc" which included the masters to the original recordings of "La Maravilla". In response Arcangel and his own label gave the album out for free on the internet and it became the most downloaded free album/mixtape in the history of Spanish Hip Hop and Reggaeton. Luny Tunes and Mas Flow Inc would eventually release a reworked version known as "El Fenómeno" later that year with distribution from Machete Music/Universal Latino. "El Fenomeno" excludes some songs from "La Maravilla".)

- Randy Nota Loka - "Romances de una nota 2021" (2008)

(Also shelved by Sony Latin when executives believed there was no commercial potential for the product. Eventually the album was bootlegged in Puerto Rico and found its way onto the internet. The album was praised by the reggaeton community and regarded as the best work of Jowell & Randy's career. In response, White Lion took Cosculluela to Machete Music/Universal Music Latino whom had yet to receive a release date for his anticipated 'El Principe' which was originally going to be distributed by Sony BMG).

- Cosculluela - "El Principe" (2009)
- Calle 13 - Los de Atrás Vienen Conmigo (2009) Elías de León Served as Executive Producer
- White Lion "La Nueva Kamada" (2009) *various artists*
- Cosculluela - "El Principe: Ghost Edition" (2009)
- Jowell & Randy - "El Momento" (2010)
- Cosculluela - "El Niño" (2011)
- Guelo Star - "The Movie Man" (2012)
- Jowell & Randy - Pre-Doxis (2012)

Released for free on the internet.

- Nico Canada - A Lo Under vol. 1: Perreo Perreo (2012)
- Nico Canada - A Lo Under vol. 2: Zona De Perreo (2012)
- Cosculluela - "War Kingz" (2012)
- Imperio Nazza/Jowell & Randy - Doxis Edition (2013)

Released alongside Musicologo and Menes (Los De La Nazza)' company Nazza Records.

- Jowell & Randy - "Sobredoxis" (2013)
- Cosculluela - "The Ultimate Collection" (2013)
- Back To The Underground (2013) *various artists*
- Falo - Back To The Underground: Falo Edition (2013)
- OG Black - Back To The Underground: Francotirador Edition (2013)
- Watussi - La Revelacion Del Under: Back To The Underground (2013)
- Maicol y Manuel - Back To The Underground: Yakaleando Edition (2014)
- Polaco - Back To The Underground: Polakan Edition (2014)
- Frankie Boy - Back To The Underground: Frankie Boy Edition (2014)
- Wiso G - Back To The Underground: Wiso G Edition (2014)
- DJ Dicky - El De Las Manos Magicas (2014)
- Cosculluela - "Santa Cos" (2014)
- Jowell y Randy - Under Doxis (2014)

Released for free download on the internet. You can search it on Google.

- Álvaro Díaz - "Hato Rey" (2015)
- Joyce Santana - "Luz En La Oscuridad" (2015)
- La Tribu De Abrante - "Otro Formato De Musica" (2016)
- Gomba Jahbari - "La Vieja Senda" (2016)
- Darell - "La Verdadera Vuelta" (2016)
