= List of Billboard Latin Rhythm Albums number ones of 2013 =

The Latin Rhythm Albums chart is a music chart published in Billboard magazine. The data is compiled by Nielsen SoundScan from a sample that includes music stores, music departments at electronics and department stores, internet sales (both physical and digital) and verifiable sales from concert venues in the United States. The chart is composed of studio, live, and compilation releases by Latin artists performing in the Latin hip hop, urban, dance and reggaeton, the most popular Latin Rhythm music genres.

== Albums ==
Chart date	Album	Artist(s)	Reference
January 5	Líderes	Wisin & Yandel	
January 12	Líderes	Wisin & Yandel	
January 19	Líderes	Wisin & Yandel	
January 26	Líderes	Wisin & Yandel	
February 2	Líderes	Wisin & Yandel	
February 9	Líderes	Wisin & Yandel	
February 16	Líderes	Wisin & Yandel	
February 23	Líderes	Wisin & Yandel	
March 2	Líderes	Wisin & Yandel	
March 9	Líderes	Wisin & Yandel	
March 16	Líderes	Wisin & Yandel	
March 23	Líderes	Wisin & Yandel	
March 30	Don Omar Presents MTO²: New Generation	Don Omar	
April 6	Don Omar Presents MTO²: New Generation	Don Omar	
April 13	Líderes	Wisin & Yandel	
April 20	Líderes	Wisin & Yandel	
April 27	Don Omar Presents MTO²: New Generation	Don Omar	
May 4	Líderes	Wisin & Yandel	
May 11	Don Omar Presents MTO²: New Generation	Don Omar	
May 18	Don Omar Presents MTO²: New Generation	Don Omar	
May 25	Don Omar Presents MTO²: New Generation	Don Omar	
June 1	Pina Records Presenta: La Formula: The Company	Various Artists	
June 8	Pina Records Presenta: La Formula: The Company	Various Artists	
June 15	Pina Records Presenta: La Formula: The Company	Various Artists	
June 22	Sobredoxis	Jowell & Randy	
June 29	Don Omar Presents MTO²: New Generation	Don Omar	
July 6	Pina Records Presenta: La Formula: The Company	Various Artists	
July 13	Sobredoxis	Jowell & Randy	
July 20	Don Omar Presents MTO²: New Generation	Don Omar	
July 27	Don Omar Presents MTO²: New Generation	Don Omar	
August 3	Don Omar Presents MTO²: New Generation	Don Omar	
August 10	Don Omar Presents MTO²: New Generation	Don Omar	
August 17	Sobredoxis	Jowell & Randy	
August 24	Don Omar Presents MTO²: New Generation	Don Omar	
August 31	La Tumba del Alma	Kinto Sol	
September 7	La Tumba del Alma	Kinto Sol	
September 14	La Tumba del Alma	Kinto Sol	
September 21	La Tumba del Alma	Kinto Sol	
September 28	La Tumba del Alma	Kinto Sol	
October 5	La Tumba del Alma	Kinto Sol	
October 12	La Tumba del Alma	Kinto Sol	
October 19	Don Omar Presents MTO²: New Generation	Don Omar	
October 26	Don Omar Presents MTO²: New Generation	Don Omar	
November 2	Don Omar Presents MTO²: New Generation	Don Omar	
November 9	Chosen Few Urbano: "Continues"	Boy Wonder	
November 16	King Daddy	Daddy Yankee	
November 23	De Líder a Leyenda	Yandel	
November 30	De Líder a Leyenda	Yandel	
December 7	Sentimiento, Elegancia & Maldad	Arcangel	
December 14	Sentimiento, Elegancia & Maldad	Arcangel	
December 21	De Líder a Leyenda	Yandel	
December 28	De Líder a Leyenda	Yandel	
