= List of Billboard Latin Rhythm Albums number ones of 2011 =

The Latin Rhythm Albums chart is a music chart published in Billboard magazine. The data is compiled by Nielsen SoundScan from a sample that includes music stores, music departments at electronics and department stores, internet sales (both physical and digital) and verifiable sales from concert venues in the United States. The chart is composed of studio, live, and compilation releases by Latin artists performing in the Latin hip hop, urban, dance and reggaeton, the most popular Latin Rhythm music genres.

== Albums ==
Chart date	Album	Artist(s)	Reference
January 1	Don Omar Presents: Meet The Orphans	Don Omar	
January 8	Armando	Pitbull	
January 15	Armando	Pitbull	
January 22	Armando	Pitbull	
January 29	Armando	Pitbull	
February 5	Armando	Pitbull	
February 12	Los Vaqueros: El Regreso	Wisin & Yandel	
February 19	Los Vaqueros: El Regreso	Wisin & Yandel	
February 26	Los Vaqueros: El Regreso	Wisin & Yandel	
March 5	Los Vaqueros: El Regreso	Wisin & Yandel	
March 12	Los Vaqueros: El Regreso	Wisin & Yandel	
March 19	Los Vaqueros: El Regreso	Wisin & Yandel	
March 26	Los Vaqueros: El Regreso	Wisin & Yandel	
April 2	Los Vaqueros: El Regreso	Wisin & Yandel	
April 9	Los Vaqueros: El Regreso	Wisin & Yandel	
April 16	Los Vaqueros: El Regreso	Wisin & Yandel	
April 23	Los Vaqueros: El Regreso	Wisin & Yandel	
April 30	Los Vaqueros: El Regreso	Wisin & Yandel	
May 7	Los Vaqueros: El Regreso	Wisin & Yandel	
May 14	Los Vaqueros: El Regreso	Wisin & Yandel	
May 21	Don Omar Presents: Meet The Orphans	Don Omar	
May 28	Don Omar Presents: Meet The Orphans	Don Omar	
June 4	Don Omar Presents: Meet The Orphans	Don Omar	
June 11	Don Omar Presents: Meet The Orphans	Don Omar	
June 18	Don Omar Presents: Meet The Orphans	Don Omar	
June 25	Don Omar Presents: Meet The Orphans	Don Omar	
July 2	Don Omar Presents: Meet The Orphans	Don Omar	
July 9	Don Omar Presents: Meet The Orphans	Don Omar	
July 16	Don Omar Presents: Meet The Orphans	Don Omar	
July 23	Don Omar Presents: Meet The Orphans	Don Omar	
July 30	Los Vaqueros: El Regreso	Wisin & Yandel	
August 6	Don Omar Presents: Meet The Orphans	Don Omar	
August 13	Don Omar Presents: Meet The Orphans	Don Omar	
August 20	Don Omar Presents: Meet The Orphans	Don Omar	
August 27	Don Omar Presents: Meet The Orphans	Don Omar	
September 3	Don Omar Presents: Meet The Orphans	Don Omar	
September 10	Don Omar Presents: Meet The Orphans	Don Omar	
September 17	Don Omar Presents: Meet The Orphans	Don Omar	
September 24	Don Omar Presents: Meet The Orphans	Don Omar	
October 1	Don Omar Presents: Meet The Orphans	Don Omar	
October 8	Ready Hits 21: Limited Edition	Akwid	
October 15	Don Omar Presents: Meet The Orphans	Don Omar	
October 22	Don Omar Presents: Meet The Orphans	Don Omar	
October 29	Don Omar Presents: Meet The Orphans	Don Omar	
November 5	Don Omar Presents: Meet The Orphans	Don Omar	
November 12	Don Omar Presents: Meet The Orphans	Don Omar	
November 19	Don Omar Presents: Meet The Orphans	Don Omar	
November 26	Entren Los Que Quieran	Calle 13	
December 3	Entren Los Que Quieran	Calle 13	
December 10	Invencible	Tito "El Bambino"	
December 17	Invencible	Tito "El Bambino"	
December 24	Invencible	Tito "El Bambino"	
December 31	El Niño	Cosculluela	
