= DJ Secuaz =

Puerto Rican musician

- Born: Raúl Dávila Reyes; 1989; San Juan, Puerto Rico
- Died: March 12, 2013 (aged 23–24); San Juan, Puerto Rico
- Occupations: DJ; record producer
- Known for: Pre-Doxis

Raúl Dávila Reyes (1989 – 12 March 2013), better known as DJ Secuaz was a Puerto Rican disc jockey and reggaeton producer from Live Music. He worked with some reggaeton artists as Jowell & Randy and J-King & Maximan. One of his last works was the mixtape Pre-Doxis.

On March 9, 2013, Dávila was shot in the head after a disagreement at a club. He died three days later. Some Live Music artists as Jowell & Randy, J-King, Yomo, Divino, and others, performed a song to honor the late producer.
