= La Sista =

Puerto Rican reggaeton musician

- Born: Maidel Amador Canales; 1985 (age 40–41); Loiza, Puerto Rico
- Genres: Reggaeton, R&B
- Occupation: singer-songwriter
- Years active: 2006–2010, 2016–present
- Label: Machete Music Baby Records Inc.

La Sista (Maidel Amador Canales) is a Puerto Rican reggaeton singer.

From Loíza, Puerto Rico, several members of her family are also musicians. She got a big break at the age of 19 when she appeared on the television programme La Casa Under, and since signed to Machete Music, releasing her debut album in 2006.

== Discography ==
- Majestad Negroide (2006), Machete Music
- Los RompeCorazones: Teorias Del Amor vol.1 (2007) – Various artists, compilation

=== Singles ===
- "Anacaona (2006)
- "Se Desvive Por Ella" (R&B version) feat. Jadiel (2007)
- "Se Desvive Por Ella" (Reggaeton Version) Feat. Jadiel (2007)
- "Se Desvive Por Ella" (Remix) feat. Jadiel, Ivy Queen (2007/08)
- "Dos Amantes, Dos Amigos" feat Mario VI (2008)
- "Callejero" feat. Jay V & Cano (2008)
- "Striper" (2008)
- "Striper" (Remix) feat.Jowell & Randy (2008)
- "Se Le Ve" (2009)
- "Se Le Ve" (Remix) feat.Yomo (2009)
- "Me Faltas Tu" Ft. Juno (2011)

== Other Collaborations ==
- "Dime St Tu Pienses En Mi" (remix) Nicky Jam feat La Zista
- "Te Vi" (On the album Los Mero Mero)
- "Fruty Loop" feat. Tony Lenta
