= El Momento =

Studio album by Jowell & Randy
- Released: May 4, 2010
- Recorded: 2009–2010
- Genre: Reggaeton, latin pop, dance, reggae
- Length: 63:03
- Label: WY Records, Live Music, White Lion, Machete Music
- Producer: Wisin & Yandel (Executive); Elías De León (Executive); Tainy; Nesty "La Mente Maestra"; DJ Giann; Mr. Greenz; Dexter; DJ Blass; The Hitmen; Guelo Star

Jowell & Randy chronology
| Tengan Paciencia (2010) | El Momento (2010) | Sobredoxis (2013) |

Randy chronology
| Tengan Paciencia (2010) | El Momento (2011) | Una Nota Con Elegancia (2012) |

Singles from El Momento
- 1. "Loco" Released: February 27, 2010; 2. "Un Booty Nuevo" Released: April 23, 2010; 3. "Suave y Lento" Released: November 2010; 4. "Goodbye" Released: January 2011; 5. "Solo Por Ti" Released: July 2011

El Momento (English: The Moment) is the second studio album of Jowell y Randy which was released by WY Records. Its 15 tracks include collaborations with Wisin & Yandel, Plan B, Guelo Star, Yaviah, Franco "El Gorila", De La Ghetto, Cosculluela, Gadiel, and Tico. It was released on May 4, 2010.

This album peaked at No. 2 in the Billboard Top Latin Albums chart in the week of May 22, 2010.

== Track list ==
1. "Intro"
2. "Goodbye"
3. "Suave y Lento" (feat. Wisin, Tico "El Imigrante" & Franco "El Gorila")
4. "No Fue Una Noche Normal"
5. "Un Booty Nuevo" (feat. Yaviah)
6. "Chica De Novela"
7. "Dile A Él"
8. "Amanece (feat. Yandel & Gadiel)
9. "Loco"
10. "Hacerlo Así" (feat. Guelo Star)
11. "Mi Dama De Colombia"
12. "Solo Por Ti [Remix]" (feat. Cultura Profetica)
13. "Quien Tiene Mas Flow" (feat. De La Ghetto)
14. "Su Mama No Sabe Na" (feat. Plan B)
15. "We From The Bled" (feat. Cosculluela)

== Videos ==
1. "Loco"
2. "Un Booty Nuevo" (feat. Yaviah)
3. "Loco (Remix)" (feat. Wisin & Yandel)
4. "Mi Dama De Colombia"
5. "Goodbye"
6. "Dile A Él (Salsa Version)" (feat. N'Klabe)
7. "Mi Dama De Colombia (Remix)" (feat. J-Balvin, Pipe Calderon & Pipe Bueno)
8. "Solo Por Ti" (feat. Cultura Profetica)

== Promotional Songs Non Album ==
1. "Te Siento (Remix)" (feat. Wisin & Yandel)
2. "Loco (Remix)" (feat. Wisin & Yandel)
3. "Mi Dama De Colombia (Remix)" (feat. J-Balvin, Pipe Calderon & Pipe Bueno)
4. "Dile A El (Salsa Version)" (feat. N'Klave)

== Charts ==
| Chart (2010) | Peak position |
|---|---|
| US Billboard 200 | 112 |
| US Top Latin Albums (Billboard) | 2 |
| US Latin Rhythm Albums (Billboard) | 2 |
