= List of Billboard Latin Rhythm Airplay number ones of 2007 =

The Billboard Latin Rhythm Airplay is a chart that ranks the most-played songs on Latin rhythm radio stations. Published by Billboard magazine, the data are compiled by Nielsen SoundScan based collectively on each single's weekly airplay.

== Chart history ==
Issue date	Song	Artist(s)	Ref.
January 6	"Dime"	Pitbull featuring Frankie J and Ken-Y	
January 13	"Dime"	Pitbull featuring Frankie J and Ken-Y	
January 20	"Dime"	Pitbull featuring Frankie J and Ken-Y	
January 27	"Pam Pam"	Wisin & Yandel	
February 3	"Sola"	Héctor el Father	
February 10	"Sola"	Héctor el Father	
February 17	"Sola"	Héctor el Father	
February 24	"Sola"	Héctor el Father	
March 3	"Sola"	Héctor el Father	
March 10	"Sola"	Héctor el Father	
March 17	"Sola"	Héctor el Father	
March 24	"Sola"	Héctor el Father	
March 31	"Sola"	Héctor el Father	
April 7	"Sola"	Héctor el Father	
April 14	"Sola"	Héctor el Father	
April 21	"Igual Que Ayer"	R.K.M & Ken-Y	
April 28	"Igual Que Ayer"	R.K.M & Ken-Y	
May 5	"Sola"	Héctor el Father	
May 12	"Impacto"	Daddy Yankee featuring Fergie	
May 19	"Impacto"	Daddy Yankee featuring Fergie	
May 26	"Impacto"	Daddy Yankee featuring Fergie	
June 2	"Impacto"	Daddy Yankee featuring Fergie	
June 9	"Impacto"	Daddy Yankee featuring Fergie	
June 16	"Impacto"	Daddy Yankee featuring Fergie	
June 23	"Impacto"	Daddy Yankee featuring Fergie	
June 30	"Impacto"	Daddy Yankee featuring Fergie	
July 7	"Impacto"	Daddy Yankee featuring Fergie	
July 14	"Igual Que Ayer"	R.K.M & Ken-Y	
July 21	"Impacto"	Daddy Yankee featuring Fergie	
July 28	"Igual Que Ayer"	R.K.M & Ken-Y	
August 4	"No Te Veo"	Casa de Leones	
August 11	"Mi Corazoncito"	Aventura	
August 18	"No Te Veo"	Casa de Leones	
August 25	"No Te Veo"	Casa de Leones	
September 1	"Ella Me Levantó"	Daddy Yankee	
September 8	"Ella Me Levantó"	Daddy Yankee	
September 15	"Ella Me Levantó"	Daddy Yankee	
September 22	"Ella Me Levantó"	Daddy Yankee	
September 29	"Ella Me Levantó"	Daddy Yankee	
October 6	"Ella Me Levantó"	Daddy Yankee	
October 13	"No Te Veo"	Casa de Leones	
October 20	"No Te Veo"	Casa de Leones	
October 27	"No Te Veo"	Casa de Leones	
November 3	"Sexy Movimiento"	Wisin & Yandel	
November 10	"Sexy Movimiento"	Wisin & Yandel	
November 17	"Sexy Movimiento"	Wisin & Yandel	
November 24	"Sexy Movimiento"	Wisin & Yandel	
December 1	"Sexy Movimiento"	Wisin & Yandel	
December 8	"Sexy Movimiento"	Wisin & Yandel	
December 15	"Sexy Movimiento"	Wisin & Yandel	
December 22	"Sexy Movimiento"	Wisin & Yandel	
December 29	"Sexy Movimiento"	Wisin & Yandel	

== Note ==
The best-performing Latin rhythm song of 2007 was "Pegao" by Wisin & Yandel featuring Los Vaqueros, which peaked at number two.

== See also ==
- List of number-one Billboard Hot Latin Songs of 2007
