= Siente el Boom =

Single by Tito El Bambino

Single by Tito El Bambino featuring Randy

from the album Top of the Line: El Internacional
- Released: July 12, 2006; 2007
- Recorded: 2006
- Genre: Reggaeton
- Length: 4:39
- Producer(s): DJ Giann; Dexter; Mister Greenz; DJ Casper

Tito El Bambino singles chronology
"Mía" (2007)	"Siente el Boom" (2006)	"Bailarlo" (2007)

Jowell & Randy singles chronology
"Agresivo" (2006)	"Siente el Boom (remix)" (2007)	"Eh Oh Eh Oh" (2007)

De la Ghetto singles chronology
"Siente el Boom (remix)" (2007)	"Ese Mahón" (2008)

"Siente el Boom" (English: "Feel the Boom") is a single by Tito El Bambino featuring Randy from the album Chosen Few II: El Documental. The remix features De la Ghetto, Jowell & Randy which is in the album Top of the Line: El Internacional as well as in the video game Grand Theft Auto IV. Another remix, with rapper Joell Ortiz was included in the album Chosen Few: Remix Classicos. It was released digitally on July 12, 2006.

== Music video ==
- "Siente el Boom (remix)" official music video

== Charts ==
Chart (2007)	Peak position
U.S. Billboard Hot Latin Songs	14
U.S. Billboard Latin Rhythm Airplay	3
U.S. Billboard Latin Tropical Airplay	9
Venezuela Top Latino (Record Report)	1

== Siente el Boom 2 ==
"Déjala Caer (Siente el Boom 2)"

Single by Guelo Star featuring Jowell & Randy

from the album The Movie Man
- Released: 2012
- Recorded: 2012
- Genre: Reggaeton
- Length: 4:46
- Label: Live
- Songwriter(s): Guelo Star; Jowell & Randy
- Producer(s): Hyde el Verdadero Químico; Dexter y Mr. Greenz; Gaby Music

Guelo Star featuring Jowell & Randy singles chronology
"Que la Nota Le Suba (official remix)" (2012)	"Déjala Caer (Siente el Boom 2)" (2012)

Guelo Star released a sequel version of "Siente el Boom" as the second single from the debut studio album, The Movie Man.
