= Impacto =

2007 single by Daddy Yankee

Single by Daddy Yankee

from the album El Cartel: The Big Boss
- Released: April 12, 2007 (radio); May 15, 2007 (US)
- Genre: Reggaeton; hip hop
- Length: 3:05 (original version); 3:27 (remix featuring Fergie); 4:40 (remix featuring Casa de Leones)
- Label: El Cartel; Interscope
- Songwriters: Raymond Ayala; Stacy Ferguson; William Adams
- Producers: Scott Storch; Tainy

Daddy Yankee singles chronology
"El Truco" (2006)	"Impacto" (2007)	"Ella Me Levantó" (2007)

Remix single

Fergie singles chronology
"Big Girls Don't Cry" (2007)	"Impacto (Remix)" (2007)	"Clumsy" (2007)

Music video
- "Daddy Yankee - Impacto (Remix) ft. Fergie" on YouTube

"Impacto" (English: "Impact") is the first single by Puerto Rican reggaeton performer Daddy Yankee from his fifth studio album El Cartel: The Big Boss. It was released on April 12, 2007 by El Cartel Records. "Impacto" was nominated for Song of the Year at the Premios Lo Nuestro 2008. The official remix features American singer Fergie.

== Song information ==
The song was produced by Scott Storch and reggaeton producer Tainy. There is also a remix featuring Fergie, which is also featured in the same album and features more spanglish lyrics than the original version. Additionally, the song is featured in the EA Sports game Madden 08, Rockstar game Grand Theft Auto IV and Harmonix Music Systems game Dance Central 2. Daddy Yankee made another remix of "Impacto" featuring the reggaeton group Casa de Leones.

== Music video ==
According to an interview by Primer Impacto news, who were on the set of the remix version video, Daddy Yankee says there will be two videos, one for the remix featuring pop and R&B singer Fergie and a second for the original. The original video features many cities including London, Tokyo, New York, San Juan and Mexico City. The remix video includes bits and pieces from the original video, adding Fergie and her parts. According to Daddy Yankee, it was one of the most expensive music videos he had taken a part of at the time.

The video premiered on Total Request Live on May 8, 2007, and reached number one. The remix has been viewed more than 50 million times on YouTube with the original being viewed more than three million times, adding up to more than 16 million views. The music video earned the Lo Nuestro Award for Video of the Year.

== Track listing and formats ==
US CD promo

1. "Impacto" (album version)
2. "Impacto" (instrumental version)
3. "Impacto" (clean remix) (featuring Fergie)
4. "Impacto" (dirty remix) (featuring Fergie)

US CD single

1. "Impacto" (album version)
2. "Impacto" (remix) (featuring Fergie)
3. (B-side)
4. "Impacto" (music video)

== Chart performance ==
Chart (2007)	Peak position
Australia (ARIA Charts)	81
Chile Top 20	1
Hispanic-American Radio (Top Latino)	12
US Billboard Hot 100	56
US Pop 100 (Billboard)	54
US Hot Latin Songs (Billboard)	2
US Latin Rhythm Airplay (Billboard)	1
US Latin Tropical Airplay (Billboard)	7
Venezuela Pop Rock (Record Report)	1
Venezuela Top Latino (Record Report)	3
Venezuela Top 100 (Record Report)	20

== Media appearances ==
Video games

- The song was used for 2008's Grand Theft Auto IV soundtrack.
- The song was used for 2007's Madden NFL 08 EA Trax.
- The remix version was used as a playable song in 2011's Dance Central 2.

Other media

- The song was used for a 2007's Pepsi commercial.

== See also ==
- List of Billboard Latin Rhythm Airplay number ones of 2007
