= Cosculluela =

Puerto Rican rapper (born 1980)

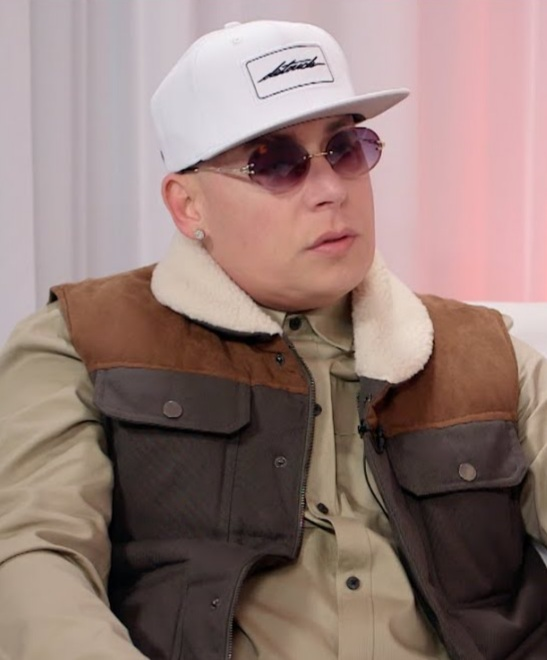
- Cosculluela in 2020

Background information
- Also known as: El Príncipe; Dracula Boy; Coscu; El Niño; Snow White
- Born: José Fernando Cosculluela Suárez; October 15, 1980 (age 45); Humacao, Puerto Rico
- Genres: Reggaeton; Latin hip hop; Latin trap
- Occupations: Rapper; singer; songwriter
- Years active: 2004–present
- Labels: Rottweilas; White Lion; Vene

José Fernando Cosculluela Suárez (born October 15, 1980), known professionally as Cosculluela, is a Puerto Rican rapper, singer and songwriter.

== Early life and education ==
Cosculluela was born in Puerto Rico from Puerto Rican mother and Cuban father. He came from an upper-class family and was raised in the gated community of Palmas del Mar. At a young age, Cosculluela became interested in tennis and eventually played for his high school, Colegio San Antonio Abad. He also developed passions for golf and surfing.

== Career ==
At the age of sixteen, Cosculluela began producing underground mixtapes with his brother Jaime and his friends. After a few years of recording underground, popular reggaeton producer Buddha found out about Cosculluela's talents in a San Juan studio. Buddha was working with Latin hip hop producer Echo at the time. Buddha selected Cosculluela to replace rapper Tempo in the hip hop group Buddha's Family. Echo eventually signed Cosculluela to his label, Invasion Music.

Cosculluela gained international recognition with the hit single "Te Va Ir Mal" (feat. Getto) from the album Buddha's Family 2 distributed by Machete Music/Universal Latino. Soon after, Cosculluela began working with famed producers Gocho and Álex Gárgolas for multiple compilation albums. He also released a reworked version of his classic mixtape, "Este Es Mi Momento", in 2006.

After this, Cosculluela moved up in the ranks of reggaeton, appearing on such albums as Los Bandoleros Reloaded, Invasion, Gárgolas, Los Bravos, El Pentágono, El Pentágono: The Return, Los Brother, Talento de Barrio, and many more. Cosculluela is known to many as "El Príncipe del Verso" (The Prince of Verse) because of his exceptional lyrical abilities as an MC.

Echo was unable to get Universal Latino to release an album from any of his artists and only saw his compilation album "Invasion vol. 1" distributed. This caused Cosculluela to leave Invasion in 2007 and sign a recording contract with the renowned executive producer Elias De León and his influential record label White Lion Records. After struggling with record executives to set a release for his debut album, which was originally meant to be distributed on Sony Latin, and after various delays in 2009, Machete Music was pressured into releasing Cosculluela's hit debut album, "El Príncipe" (The Prince). It was released thanks to Cosculluela's friendship with Wisin & Yandel, who had a partnership with Universal Latino for their record label WY Records and were very influential at the company due to their immense success and popularity.

=== El Príncipe ===
In 2009, Cosculluela released his first album, El Príncipe. The album was announced a year earlier and it was named after one of his nicknames. . It peaked at number three on the Billboard Top Latin Albums chart and spawned the hit singles "Na Na Nau", "Prrrum", and "Plaka Plaka". It also reached number eight on the Billboard Rap Albums chart. A few tracks were left out of the final production. El Príncipe was one of the most successful reggaeton albums of the year, becoming critically acclaimed due to its diversity in lyrics and style.

=== El Príncipe: Ghost Edition ===
In 2010, Cosculluela released his first album called El Príncipe: Ghost Edition. This album was a review of his first album, but with 5 new tracks. These 5 tracks were Cuidau Au Au, Humo, Prrrum Remix ft. Nardo Ranks, and Another Prrrum Remix. They were performed with Wisin & Yandel, and the last track was De Noche y De Día feat. Yandel.

=== El Niño ===
El Niño comes with many romantic, hip hop and reggaeton lyrics. Collaborations that have been announced so far are Wisin & Yandel and Los Mafiaboyz. Two singles have been released so far, they are: "Blam Blam" and "Si Tú No Estás." The remix of "Si Tú No Estás" will feature Puerto Rican artist Farruko, Colombian sensation J Balvin and the duo Ñejo & Dalmata.

=== War Kingz (2012) ===
War Kingz is the name of Cosculluela's first mixtape, which came out on December 11, 2012. This album helped new talents within the artist's company to apply themselves within the urban environment.

=== Blanco Perla ===
In 2014 Cosculluela left Universal Latino which lead to a bidding war among Latin labels to sign him, thanks to his success and much-publicized rap battle against Tempo. Warner Music Latina won the right to distribute Cosculluela's works through his Rottweilas Inc imprint and immediately began work on his latest album "Blanco Perla". Cosculluela released the "Baby Boo" featuring Wise "The Gold Pen" and DJ Luian to prepare for his upcoming release.

In 2015 Cosculluela released "Te Busco", featuring Nicky Jam, the first single from his album Blanco Perla. In October 2016, he released the album, which features major hits such as "Te Busco", "Manicomio", and "La Boda", the latter of which is about his wedding, which occurred in November 2015; it features singer O'Neill as well as an intro by rapper Kendo Kaponi. The album also features collaborations with artists such as Daddy Yankee, Nicky Jam, Farruko, Arcángel, De La Ghetto, and Tempo.

=== 2021/2023 ===
In November 2021, Cosculluela signed an exclusive deal with ONErpm. The contract is also in partnership with his longtime label Rottweilas, Inc. and in the year 2023 released new album called Los Muertos.

== Controversy ==
On September 15, 2018, Anuel AA released a diss track aimed at Cosculluela. The track was widely criticized due to its foul language and offensive remarks about homosexuality and HIV patients.

Two years later, amid the George Floyd protests around the world, the urban artist expressed through Instagram Live that Afro-Puerto Ricans are not descendants of Africa. This is contrary to the basic teachings of the Puerto Rican education system that educate on the history and colonization process of Puerto Rico which included the African slave trade that lasted almost 350 years, and the vast and evident African influence on Puerto Rican culture (along with European Spanish and indigenous Taíno influences). Although he did not clarify where he believed the Afro-Puerto Ricans are originally from, in his insulting expressions of June 7, 2020, he also called for Puerto Ricans to not join in on protests, calling the demonstrations a "crap that affects the economy". Later that day, the urban artist issued an apology.

== Discography ==
=== Studio albums ===
- El Príncipe (2009) – No. 185 US Billboard 200
- El Niño (2011)
- Blanco Perla (2016)
- El Príncipe 2 (2023)

=== Mixtapes ===
- War Kingz (2012)

=== Collaborations ===
Cosculluela has collaborated with Daddy Yankee, Don Omar, Héctor el Father, Wisin & Yandel, Nicky Jam, Maluma, Darkiel Omar, Mexicano, Arcángel, De La Ghetto, Kendo Kaponi, Zion & Lennox, J Álvarez, Farruko, Ivy Queen, Ñejo & Dalmata, Pacho & Cirilo, Benny Benni, Pusho, Jowell & Randy, Ñengo Flow, Jenny la Sexy Voz and the singers Christians, Maso and Bima.

=== Singles/Featuring ===
- "No Hacen Na" (Remix) (featuring Héctor el Father, Yomo, Yaga & Mackie, Wisin, Ñengo Flow, Tego Calderón, Julio Voltio, Lito MC Cassidy, Polaco, Arcángel & De La Ghetto, Fat Man Scoop, Mario VI)
- "El Armageddon" (featuring Ñengo Flow, Syko "El Terror", Julio Voltio, Lito MC Cassidy, Polaco, Eddie Dee, Vico C, Tego Calderón)
- "No Pidas Perdon"
- "Te Va Ir Mal" (featuring Ghetto)
- "La Calle Llora" (featuring Mexicano)
- "Dime Con Quien Andas"
- "Asi Es Mi Vida" (Remix) (featuring Syko, De La Ghetto, Yomo, Guelo Star)
- "One Blood"
- "Somos De Calle" (Remix) (featuring Daddy Yankee, De La Ghetto, Chyno Nyno, Guelo Star, MC Ceja, Arcángel, Julio Voltio, Nejo, Baby Rasta)
- "Full Records R.I.P"
- "One Blood" (Remix) (featuring Chencho Corleone, Ñengo Flow)
- "Tú y Yo Solos" (featuring Aldo El Arquitecto)
- "Un Pesito" (Remix) (featuring Julio Voltio)
- "Ella No Es Fácil" (featuring Farruko)
- "Click, Clack"
- "No Necesito" (Remix) (featuring Ñejo & Dalmata, DJ RAC ROLY)
- "Na Na Nau" (Remix) (featuring Jowell & Randy)
- "La Reunión De Los Vaqueros" (featuring Wisin & Yandel, De La Ghetto, Franco "El Gorila", Tego Calderón)
- "Permanent" (featuring Ivy Queen)
- "Permanent" (Remix) (featuring Ivy Queen, Chyno Nyno, Ñengo Flow, and Franco "El Gorila")
- "Dime Quien" (featuring Young Hollywood)
- "Cuidau Au Au" (Remix) (featuring Daddy Yankee, Alexis & Fido)
- "Blam Blam" (featuring Alexis & Fido) (Perreologia)
- "Pa' Que Te Quites La Ropa" (Remix) (featuring Yomo, J King & Maximan)
- "Latin Girl" (Chosen Few) (featuring Omega "El Fuerte", Jenny)
- "Cuando Cae La Noche" (featuring Franco "El Gorila")
- "Latin Girl Remix" (Chosen Few) (featuring Omega "El Fuerte", Jenny, Jowell & Randy, De La Ghetto)
- "Bien Dura" (featuring Ian "The Kid Capo", Yomo)
- "Dinero Y Fama" (featuring Franco "El Gorila")
- "Patrullando"
- "Bye Bye" (featuring Jey y El Punto featuring Jowell & Randy)
- "El Juego" (featuring Dyland & Lenny)
- "A Dem"
- "Titerito" (Remix) (featuring Farruko and Ñengo Flow)
- "Si Te Me Pegas" (featuring John Jay)
- "A Tu Gata Le Gusta" (featuring Jolhe and Vistol)
- "Viviendo FreeStyle" (featuring O´Neill)
- "En La Lenta (featuring Farruko)
- "Yo Te Amé"
- "Solo Verte"
- "La Nueve Y La Fory"
- "Con Calma" (featuring Elio 'MafiaBoy')
- "Solo Verte" (Remix) (featuring Wisin and Divino)
- "Los Mejores Del Mundo" (Capítulo 1) (featuring Kendo Kaponi)
- "Trankilo Sin Vender Kilo"
- "La Liga Enterre" (featuring Kendo Kaponi, El Sica)
- "Tírale" (featuring O'Neill and Franco "El Gorila")
- "Mátalos" (Capítulo 3) (featuring Kendo Kaponi)
- "Peligro" (Capítulo 4) (featuring Kendo Kaponi)
- "Santa Cos" (RIP Tempo)
- "Presión" (featuring Wisin)
- "Sistema" (Remix) (featuring Wisin, Jory, Tito El Bambino, Eddie Avila)
- "Voy A Beber" (Remix 2) (featuring Nicky Jam, Ñejo, Farruko)
- "Payaso" (featuring Mysta El Propio)
- "Mutaciones En Mute" (RIP Genio Y Baby Johhny) (featuring El Sica)
- "Pa' la Pared" (featuring Jowell & Randy)
- "Jingle El Coyote The Show" (2014)
- "Tic Toc" (RIP Tempo)
- "Cansa'o de lo Mismo" (featuring El Sica)
- "Humilde Pero Cotizao'" (featuring O'Neil)
- "Si Mañana Muero" (featuring Pacho & Cirilo)
- "Flow De Criminales" (featuring Yomo)
- "Se Tienen Que Retirar"
- "Provando Voces"
- "No Hay Adversario"
- "Lary Lary"
- "Guitarra Mia"
- "Guerras Callejeras"
- "Fugitiva" (featuring Plan B and Justin Quiles)
- "Ellos Quieren"
- "Bandolero"
- "Potencias Liricales" (featuring Lirikal Jav)
- "Masta Flow" (featuring Lirikal Jav)
- "Entre El Bien Y El Mal" (featuring Héctor el Father)
- "Contra Mi"
- "Asalto" (featuring Lirikal Jav)
- "Scarface"
- "Camina Derecho"
- "Bam Pa' Ti" (featuring Ñengo Flow and Mexicano 777)
- "El Combo Me Llama" (featuring Benny Benni "La Jodienda", Pusho, D-OZI, El Sica, Farruko, Daddy Yankee)
- "Probando" (featuring Daddy Yankee)
- "Gatilleros" (featuring Tito el Bambino)
- "El Que Tenga Miedo Que Se Quite" (featuring Pacho & Cirilo)
- "Lento" (featuring Jayma & Dalex)
- "Bum Bum" (Remix) (featuring Franco "El Gorila" and Farruko)
- "Las Mujeres"
- "La Calle lo Pidió" (Remix) (featuring Tito el Bambino, Wisin, Nicky Jam, J Álvarez and Zion)
- "El Que Tenga Miedo que se Quite" (Remix) (featuring Pacho & Cirilo, Juanka "El Problematik", Kendo Kaponi)
- "Lento" (Remix) (featuring Jayma & Dalex, Jory Boy, Kendo Kaponi)
- "Papa Caliente"
- "La Película" (featuring J Álvarez)
- "Suelten Pistolas" (featuring Tony Lenta, Jowell & Randy)
- "Arca VS Coscu" (featuring Arcángel)
- "Vivimos Facturando" (featuring Zion & Lennox)
- "La Calle Me Hizo" (featuring Benny Benni "La Jodienda", Daddy Yankee, Nicky Jam, Baby Rasta, J Álvarez, Farruko and Gotay "El Autentiko")
- "La Conversación" (featuring Kendo Kaponi, Beltito Esta En El Beat)
- "Chavos Pal Banco" (featuring Arcángel)
- "Baby Boo"
- "Simon Dice"
- "Te Busco" (featuring Nicky Jam)
- "Baby Boo" (Remix) (featuring Arcángel, Wisin and Daddy Yankee)
- "Decidir"
- "Gatilleros" (Remix) (featuring Tito el Bambino, Arcángel, Tempo, Ñengo Flow, Farruko, Kendo Kaponi, Alexio "La Bestia", Pusho, El Sica, Almighty, Benny Benni "La Jodienda", Juanka "El Problematik", Genio)
- "Moments" (featuring Bryant Myers)
