= El Príncipe (Cosculluela album) =

Studio album by Cosculluela
- Released: December 1, 2009
- Recorded: 2008–2009
- Genre: Hip hop; reggaeton
- Length: 54:08
- Label: White Lion; Rotweilas; Siente
- Producer: Elías De León; Jaime Cosculluela (exec.); Mueka; DJ Blass; Echo; Young Hollywood; O'Neill; Cintrax; Kendo; Lele

Singles from El Príncipe
- 1. "Prrrum" Released: September 19, 2009

El Príncipe is the debut album by Puerto Rican reggaeton and hip hop artist Cosculluela. It was released on December 1, 2009 by White Lion Records and Rottweilas Inc. The album features collaborations with Ivy Queen, De La Ghetto, Jowell & Randy, Zion & Lennox, Jomar, Kendo and O'Neill (from Joan & O'Neill). It debuted at number three on the Top Latin Albums chart and number 185 on the Billboard 200.

== Track listing ==
1. "Sube y Baja" (Echo and DJ Blass) — 3:37
2. "Warrior" (featuring Ivy Queen, O'Neill) (Echo) — 5:50
3. "Na Na Nau" (Young Hollywood) — 3:26
4. "Pienso En Tí" (featuring De La Ghetto) (Cintrax) — 4:16
5. "Prrrum" (DJ Blass, Echo and Lele El Arma Secreta) — 3:58
6. "Yo No Se Bailar" (Young Hollywood) — 3:18
7. "En Ocasiones" (Echo) — 3:48
8. "Plaka Plaka" (Young Hollywood) — 3:19
9. "Con El Pensamiento" (featuring Jowell & Randy) (Echo and DJ Blass) — 4:49
10. "Dividiendo Bandos (Intro)" (Coyote only) — 0:15
11. "Dividiendo Bandos" (Young Hollywood) — 3:53
12. "Te Deseo El Mal" (featuring Zion & Lennox) (Echo and Mueka) — 4:55
13. "Invencible (Intro)" (Kendo only) — 1:12
14. "Invencible" (featuring Jomar) (O'Neill) — 3:46
15. "Un Pesito" (Young Hollywood) — 3:26

El Principe: Ghost Edition (bonus tracks)

1. "De Noche y De Dia" featuring Yandel
2. "Cuidau Au Au"
3. "Prrrum" featuring Wisin & Yandel
4. "Prrrum" remix featuring Nardo Ranks
5. "Humo"

== Charts ==
Chart (2009)	Peak position
US Billboard 200	185
US Top Latin Albums (Billboard)	3
US Latin Rhythm Albums (Billboard)	1

== Album certification ==
Region	Certification	Certified units/sales
United States (RIAA)	Gold (Latin)	30,000^{^}
^{^} Shipments figures based on certification alone.
