= El Niño (Cosculluela album) =

Studio album by Cosculluela
- Released: December 13, 2011
- Recorded: 2011
- Genre: Reggaeton; hip hop
- Length: 48:15
- Language: Spanish
- Label: Rotweilas; White Lion; Siente
- Producer: José Javier "Mueka" Gó; Elias de León; Young Hollywood; Fenndel; DJ Urba; Rome

Cosculluela chronology
El Principe: Ghost Edition (2010)	El Niño (2011)	War Kingz (2012)

El Niño is the second album by reggaeton artist Cosculluela. It was released by Rotweilas Inc. and White Lion Records on December 13, 2011. The first single was "Si Tu No Estas", the second single was "Soñando Despierto", and the third single was "Rompan Fila". El Niño was one of the most successful and anticipated reggaeton albums of the year.

== Track listing ==
1. "Left Right Left" – 2:40
2. "Soñando Despierto" (featuring Wisin & Yandel) – 4:00
3. "Tu Me Dices, Yo Te Digo" – 3:09
4. "Si Tu No Estás" – 4:09
5. "Funeral" (featuring Lele) – 3:19
6. "No Piensas En Mi" – 3:10
7. "Chambel Patras" (featuring Los MafiaBoyz) – 3:45
8. "Rompan Fila" – 3:37
9. "Air Jamaica" (featuring Demus & Curly) – 3:45
10. "Ratatatat" – 6:14
11. "Blam Blam" – 3:11
12. "La Plastika" – 3:42
13. "Si Tu No Estás" [remix] (featuring Farruko, J Balvin and Ñejo & Dalmata) – 3:55

== Charts ==
Chart (2011)	Peak position
US Top Latin Albums (Billboard)	23
US Latin Rhythm Albums (Billboard)	1
