= My Destiny (Yomo album) =

Studio album by Yomo
- Released: November 25, 2008
- Genre: Reggaeton
- Label: Black Pearl International
- Producers: DJ Memo; DJ Blass; Naldo; DJ Giann; Dexter & Mr. Greenz; Walde the Beat Maker; Elliot el Mago de Oz

Singles from My Destiny
- 1. "Tú Te las Trae'" Released: March 2008; 2. "Descará" Released: November 2008; 3. "Mi Mujer" Released: 2009

My Destiny is the debut album by reggaeton singer Yomo, released on November 25, 2008.

== Track listing ==
1. "Yomo / Berto" (intro) (4:26)
2. "Tú Te las Trae'" (3:31)
3. "Descará" (4:50)
4. "Mi Mujer" (3:33)
5. "Secreto" (3:53)
6. "Hacerte Mía" (3:26)
7. "Por las Bocinas" (5:09)
8. "No Vaya a Llorar"
9. "Gótica Sártica" (3:47)
10. "Amor de Luna" (feat. Carly Tones) (3:41)
11. "Del Campo a la Ciudad" (feat. Julio Sanabria)
12. "Tú Te las Trae'" (remix) (feat. Jowell & Randy, Ñejo & Dálmata and Julio Voltio) (4:56)
13. "My Destiny" (7:36)

== Chart performance ==
Chart performance for My Destiny
Chart (2008)	Peak position
US Latin Rhythm Albums (Billboard)	12
