= Los Más Sueltos del Reggaetón =

Studio album by Jowell & Randy
- Released: December 18, 2007
- Genre: Reggaeton
- Length: 54:38
- Label: Warner Bros., White Lion Records
- Producer: DJ Giann; Dexter & Mister Greenz; DJ Blass

Jowell & Randy chronology
Casa de Leones (2007)	Los Más Sueltos del Reggaetón (2007)	Tengan Paciencia (2010)

Singles from Los Más Sueltos del Reggaetón
- 1. "Un Poco Loca" Released: December 2007; 2. "Let's Do It" Released: March 2008; 3. "Eh Oh Eh Oh (Bajaera de panties)/Aprovechalo" Released: April 2008

Los Más Sueltos del Reggaetón is the debut studio album by Puerto Rican reggaeton duo Jowell & Randy, released on December 18, 2007, by Warner Bros.

== Track listing ==
#	Title	Writer(s)	Time
01	"Advertios' Están"	R. Ortiz, J. Muñoz, G. Arias	4:01
02	"Agresivo II"	R. Ortiz, J. Muñoz, M. de Jesus, G. Arias	3:42
03	"Primero Baílalo"	R. Ortiz, J. Muñoz, G. Arias, D. T. Castro	3:59
04	"Un Hijo En La Disco (Remix)" (featuring Guelo Star, J-King & Maximan)	H. L. Padilla, J. Borges, M. de Jesus, R. Ortiz, J. Muñoz, A. A. Moreno, W. Moreno, M. Maldonado	6:06
05	"Bajaera de Panties (eh oh eh oh)"	R. Ortiz, J. Muñoz, V. Felix	3:34
06	"Let's Do It"	R. Ortiz, J. Muñoz, V. Felix	4:22
07	"Un Poco Loca" (featuring De La Ghetto)	R. Ortiz, J. Muñoz, S. S. Rivera, G. Arias, D. T. Torres, M. Maldonado	4:33
08	"Te Ando Buscando"	R. Ortiz, J. Muñoz, G. Arias, D. T. Torres, M. Maldonado, V. Felix	3:26
09	"Dos Palgas"	R. Ortiz, J. Muñoz, G. Arias, J. Santana	3:24
10	"Soltura"	R. Ortiz, J. Muñoz, G. Arias, D. T. Torres, M. Maldonado	3:13
11	"Sácala a Bailar"	R. Ortiz, J. Muñoz, G. Arias, D. T. Torres, M. Maldonado	3:07
12	"Ese Amor"	R. Ortiz, J. Muñoz, J. Santana	3:39
13	"No Te Veo (Original Version)"	R. Ortiz, J. Muñoz, V. Felix	4:00
14	"Que Te Vaya Bien (Remix)"	M. de Jesus, R. Ortiz, J. Covarrubias	3:38

== Chart performance ==
The album was not able to chart on the Billboard 200, but managed to chart on the Billboard Top Latin Albums chart at #42. The album even charted well on the Billboard Latin Rhythm Airplay chart at #6. The album was also a minor success on the Billboard Top Heatseekers chart at #21.

=== Charts ===
Chart (2008)	Peak position
U.S. Billboard Top Heatseekers	21
U.S. Billboard Top Latin Albums	42
U.S. Billboard Latin Rhythm Albums	6

== Certifications ==
Region	Certification	Certified units/sales
United States (RIAA)	Gold (Latin)	30,000^{‡}
^{‡} Sales+streaming figures based on certification alone.
