= Maicol & Manuel =

Puerto Rican reggaeton duo

- Origin: Puerto Rico
- Genres: Reggaeton
- Years active: 1991–2016, 2021-2026
- Members: Miguel Muñoz; Manuel A. Pérez
- Website: www.twitter.com/MaicolyManuel

Maicol & Manuel (Miguel Muñoz and Manuel A. Pérez) were a Puerto Rican reggaeton duo. They have their origins in the first wave of reggaeton artists as early as 1991. The duo have released countless songs on many various artists compilations. They worked with DJ Eric Industry and DJ Negro. In addition they have recorded and released albums such as Yakaleo and El Desquite.

== Biography ==
=== Maicol ===
Miguel Muñoz, known in the art scene as Maicol “Superstar”, is a native of San Juan. He began his unofficial solo career in music in the late 1990s, when the underground genre was secretly brewing in Puerto Rico, a movement that gave rise to the genre known today as reggaeton. His early works could not be legally sold due to their strong and explicit content. During 2005, he would participate with Gringo (from Baby Rasta & Gringo) in the album Reggaeton De Navidad. During 2007, he would also participate in Tributo a Héctor Lavoe with the song "Songoro Cosongo" with Rey Pirin and Alberto Stylee. Maicol Superstar would release his first album called "El Villano" with features of Don Chezina, Tony Tone, and Manuel. He was also included in Watussi's mixtape "La Revelacion del Under : Back to the Underground" with the song "El Lapachero". In 2015, Maicol and Don Chezina would release an album called "Durakuz", Maicol was included in Randy's "Roses and Whine" album with Mackie in the song "Amor De Fantasia". In 2017, he was featured in the song "Hello" with Alberto Stylee, Ranking Stone, Falo, and Rey Pirin, and he was in the song "Loki" featuring others. In 2019, he was featured in Tomasa Del Real's album TDR with the song "Perrea Conmigo". During 2020, maicol was included in Nico Canada's Back to the Under 2020 Ep with the song "Chit Chat" and he was in a song with Nico Canada called "Cuarentena Mix, Vol 2", Maicol also released a single called "Yo Soy Carolina B.B". In 2021, he launched his new production "De la mata", which, true to its name, consists of a compilation of unreleased heavy reggaeton songs, his song "Cinnabom" would have a remix in 2021 featuring Jowell, Alberto Stylee, Guelo Star, and Jamsha In 2021, he was also included in the song "A Lo Viva Mexico (Remix)" featuring others. during 2022, he was featured in Don Chezina's album "Esencia y Tendecia" with the song "Flow Discotek" with Aguila El Pupilo, he was also featured in Mc Ceja's album King Men 2 with the song "Bailame Baby" with Craigy T, he also released two singles which were "En Disney Con Mickey" and "Somos Fire" with Nico Canada.

== Controversy ==
A bit of controversy arose in 2006 when Hector El Father's single, "El Telefono", was released from his album Los Rompe Discotekas. The song, which featured Wisin & Yandel, became an instant hit but soon after it was released, a much older song began circulating on the Internet which featured the same chorus. The song was the original "El Telefono", which was released by Maicol & Manuel many years ago. This became a popular topic among reggaeton forums during the year, as Hector had a history of "copying" other artists' songs in his own without proper credit. It was not known, however, if Maicol & Manuel had sold the rights to the song or if Hector had used it without permission.

A popular track was soon released which was recorded in the same matter as a diss record Cam'ron released towards Jay-Z. The track showcased various verses that Hector has used from other artists, as well as the original verses sung or rapped by their original artists. The song was titled "Hector El Copion". Some of the artists from the track "Hector El Copion" are Eddie Dee, O.G.M. and Oakley. After this wave of controversy, Maicol & Manuel, along with Alberto Stylee and Nano MC, released a version of "El Telefono", with a much more modern beat than the original, dissing Hector and Wisin & Yandel.

== Career ==
Maicol y Manuel would start their careers in 1989/1990, They would meet Blanco Flake at a local church since Manuel sang in the choir, this is when they got the idea of making a musical group, creating a trio with Blanco Flake called Third World Underground, they would appear in playero 37 with "Interesada". During The Noise 1, Maicol would say "Recuerda el underground es para usted" with these words he would basically give a name towards the genre with no name "Underground", Dj Playero would even include this on his Playero 38 ( This album included their most known track out of the duo). In 1995 they would be included in Playero 39 with the track "Vacilon" featuring Alberto Stylee, They were also included in Dj Eric : Eric Industry Vol 3 with " M&M remix and as well as "En La Casa Remix", "Vamos Pa' San Juan Remix", and "Un Ano mas" (Maicol Only) (featuring Blanco Flake) in Playero Greatest hits : Street Mix. In 1996, Maicol y Manuel were included in White lion - Rap - Reggae All Stars (they were included in 4 tracks "Tu Cuerpo Es Mio" and "Mansion Crew" with Mansion crew, and with "El Reggae No Morira" and "Busca".They would continue Their careers by releasing their first album D'Underground, it was distributed by Sony Discos, the album features Alberto Stylee, Eddie ( from duo Panny & Eddie), Cocopuff, Richy Valent. In 1997 they were included in Dj Goldy 3 : The Melody, and they were included in Boricua Guerrero First Combat, they were included in Boricua Guerrero Ep with "Presa I'm Ready", they were included in The Flow Dj Nelson, they were also included in The Legend, and they were included in The Cream Vol.3, also included in The Noise : The Best Greatest Hits . In 1998 Maicol y Manuel were included in Crazy Boricuas 2, Dj Frank Time to Kill with "La Gran Figura", in Gargolas : El Comando Ataca, El Bando Corrupto with "Gualla Girl", Planet Ganja with " Cancion Boricua", Mansion Crew Todos Contra Todos, in Reencarnacion, featured in Exclusivo from Alberto Stylee.Maicol y Manuel would continue building up their careers and they would release Their second album Los Reyes Del Underground : No Hay Ley, This album included two features which was Alberto Stylee and Richy Valent, This Album was distributed by Boricua Guerrero Productions. In 2000, Maicol Y Manuel were included in Romances Del Ruido with "Danzen & Bailen", they were included in Tempo's album New Game with " De Norte @ Sur", included in Eddie Dee's album La terrorista de la Lirica with "No Amarres Fuego". During 2001 they would release a compilation album Como En Los Tiempos De Antes and it was distributed by White Lion, which include their old songs and mixes from the 90s, they were also included in Playero and Berto Guayama's album Deja vu with "Dale mami', included in Rey Pirin's album Da'Professional with the song "Chichi Mi Gial", and they were included in Dj Blass's Sandunguero album with the track "Quiero Estar Contigo", and they were included in Grayskull: Abusando with "Chica Te Lo Ruego", and they were included in Warriors 3 los magnificos with "Todas Las Yales (Remix)". In 2002 Maicol y Manuel would sign a one-year deal with Pina Records to release their third album Yakaleo, in 2002 they were also in Planet reggae with the song "Ni que a mi" from White Lion, they were featured in Alberto Stylee's album los duenos de las Disco with "Ella Tiene Algo" and they were featured in Yaga y Mackie's Sonando Diferente with " Ese Soy Yo", they were included in Dj Eric's Presenta La busqueda with "Liberar El Estres", included in The Majestic with Baby Rasta and with the track "Blam Blam", and they were lastly included in Master Joe & O.G. Black's Francotiradores 2 with the track "Sopresa". In 2003, Maicol y Manuel would release their 4th album Jake Mate, this album features Dj Blass, Don Chezina, Zion y Lennox, Speedy, Nano Mc, Falo, Alberto Stylee, etc. In 2003 Maicol y Manuel were included in Sandunguero 2 with "Si Ella Perrea", featured in sir speedy's Dando Cocotazos with "Esta Noche Quiero", and Included in Don chezina's Don Fichureo with "Es Para La Disco". In 2004, Maicol y Manuel were included in Dj blass's Lagrimas y Risas with "Como Te Extraño", and they were included in Noriega's Contra La Corriente with "Escapate Conmigo", and they were included in Ro-K y Gammy's Mala Mana with "Quieren Rebuleo". In 2005, Maicol & and Manuel released their 5th Studio album El Desquite which was distributed by Dj Nelson's Flow Music Label, the album includes features from Plan B, Guelo Star, Julio Voltio, Jowell y Randy, Nejo & Dalmata, etc. Maicol & Manuel participated in Los Cazadores : La Primera Busqueda with "Me Tiene Hipnotizao", Sandunguero Hits, and White Lion Hits Version Volume 1. In 2006, Maicol y Manuel were included in White lion's La Calle Volumen 1 with "Somos De La Calle" (featuring Julio Voltio) and were included in Dj Eric's Reggaeton Pal Bloque with "No Morire" "Tu Quieres de Esto" and "Loca Loca" (Maicol). During 2008, they would release a compilation mixtape called "the collection", Maicol & Manuel then temporarily split and started developing music as solo artists. Maicol signed to the Diririri Business record label, while Manuel operated independently at Yakaleo Music, we would then get the mixtapes "Diririri Business the movie" (2008) the most hits on this mixtape is "Caminando (with Plan b, Falo, Rey pirin, Don Chezina, Alberto Stylee)", Manuel's mixtape "Yakaleo Music" (2008) the most hits on this mixtape is "Aguanta (with Maicol)", Manuel's second mixtape "El classico" (2009) the most hits on the mixtape was "Tu me Tienes loco" and "Aguanta (featuring Maicol)" . Maicol y Manuel would appear again in Jowell & Randy's mixtape "Tengan Paciencia" with "Chocopop". during 2011, Jamsha would include Maicol y Manuel in his album "El Putipuerko" with the song "Boyo" featuring others, They would also be included in J King & Maximan’s mixtape “Querian Perreo” with the song “Es Mas Facil Pedir Perdon”. And in 2012, Maicol and Manuel would both appear but in separate songs in Nico Canada's A lo Under with the songs "Quien te Domina"(Manuel) "1#"(Maicol), and they would appear in the Nico Canada's A lo Under Vol 2 : Zona de perreo with the songs "Pam Pam". They announced that "Back To The Underground: Yakaliando Edition" was going to be released on September 27, 2013. However it was then delayed until October 3, 2013. During 2015, Maicol y manuel released their last song before they would split called “Pa Ti No Tengo Ganas” and "Molly" which was later released a version with Ugo Angelito. The cause of the separation between Maicol y Manuel was that Manuel went back to his home in Puerto Rico to take care of his son who had autism, and he had some personal problems with Maicol which were resolved later. As of September 30, 2021, the duo once again reunited and did their first interview as a group after 7 years of not speaking to each other. This was broadcast by MoluscoTV, a podcast that is led by DJ Molusco. After the podcast, They would participate in the concert of Dj Nelson and singing all of their hits. Maicol y Manuel would release a new single called "Rulai Remix" and "Un Trago Pa'Olvidar". They are also currently working on an Ep as a duo, Maicol y Manuel would later release their new single "Las Nubes". During 2022 /23, Rauw Alejandro would pay homage to maicol y manuel by using a sample of their song in playero 38 and it was used his song "De Carolina" featuring Dj Playero for his new album Saturno

== Discography ==
=== Studio albums ===
- 1996: D' Underground
- 1999: Los Reyes Del Underground
- 2002: Yakaleo
- 2003: Jake Mate
- 2005: El Desquite
- 2013: Back To The Underground: Yakaliando Edition

=== Mixtapes ===
- 2010: Los Reyes Del Underground

=== Compilation albums ===
- 2001: Como En Los Tiempos De Antes
- 2008: The Collection

=== Solo albums ===
- 2008: Manuel "El Clasico" Yakaleo Music (the mixtape)
- 2009: Manuel "El Clasico" El Classico
- 2011: Maicol Superstar El Villano
- 2015: Maicol Superstar (duo with Don Chezina) Durakuz
- 2021: Maicol Superstar De La Mata

== Singles ==
- "La Gente Sabe (De La Calle)"
- "No Hay Ley"
- " Dale mami"
- " El Biper ( featuring Nico Canada) "
- "Como los Tiempos de Antes"
- "Hey Lady"
- "Quiero Estar Contigo" featuring Ñejo y Dalmata
- "Tú Y Yo" featuring Ñejo y Dalmata
- "Yalakeo" featuring Lito y Polaco
- "Te Ando Buscando" featuring Plan B
- "Tu Me Tienes Loco"
- "Bebe"
- "Rulai (remix) "
- "Las Nubes"
- " Un Trago pa'olvidar"
- "Si Ella Perrea"
- " No Moriré featuring Baby Rasta, Speedy, Og Black, Don chezina, Joan
- "Somos De la calle featuring Julio Voltio
- "Ni Que A Mí"
- "Chocopop" featuring Jowell & Randy
- "Yo Quiero"
- "Si tu la Ves"
- "Ataka" featuring various artists
- "Pan Pan (A Lo Under)"
- "Sacudelo" featuring Jowell & Randy
- "Matraca" featuring Jowell (Back to the Underground)
- "Ando" featuring Jowell & Randy
