= Loco (Jowell & Randy song) =

Single by Jowell & Randy featuring Wisin & Yandel

from the album El Momento (Original) and Latin Party 2 (Remix)
- Released: February 27, 2010 (Album version); June 15, 2010 (Remix)
- Genre: Reggaeton, soca
- Length: 3:51 (album version); 4:00 (remix featuring Wisin & Yandel)
- Label: Machete
- Songwriters: Giann Arias, Vladimir Felix, Joel Muñoz, Randy Ortiz
- Producer: DJ Blass

Jowell & Randy singles chronology
| "ChocoPop" (2010) | "Loco" (2010) | "Un Booty Nuevo" (2010) |

Wisin & Yandel singles chronology
| "Te Siento" (2010) | "Loco (Remix)" (2010) | "Irresistible" (2010) |

"Loco" (English: "Crazy") is the lead single from Jowell & Randy's album El Momento released on February 27, 2010. A remix features reggaeton duo Wisin & Yandel, was released later on June 15, 2010.

== Live performances ==
The remix version was performed on the 2010 Premios Juventud on July 15, before that, Wisin & Yandel performed their single "Irresistible", including a choreography by the dancers of Step Up 3D dancing behind them.

== Music video ==
A music video for both versions (album version & remix) was filmed since February 23, 2010 in San Juan, Puerto Rico directed by Music video director Ulysses Terrero.

The video for the album version was premiered on March 30, 2010, while the remix version with Wisin & Yandel was premiered on July 8, 2010.

== Charts ==
| Chart (2010) | Peak position |
|---|---|
| US Hot Latin Songs (Billboard) | 22 |
| US Latin Pop Airplay (Billboard) | 15 |
| US Tropical Airplay (Billboard) | 3 |
| US Latin Rhythm Digital Songs | 3 |

=== Year-end charts ===
| End of year chart (2010) | Position |
|---|---|
| US Latin Songs Year End 2010 | 59 |
| US Latin Tropical Songs Year End 2010 | 13 |
