= Jowell & Randy =

Puerto Rican reggaeton duo

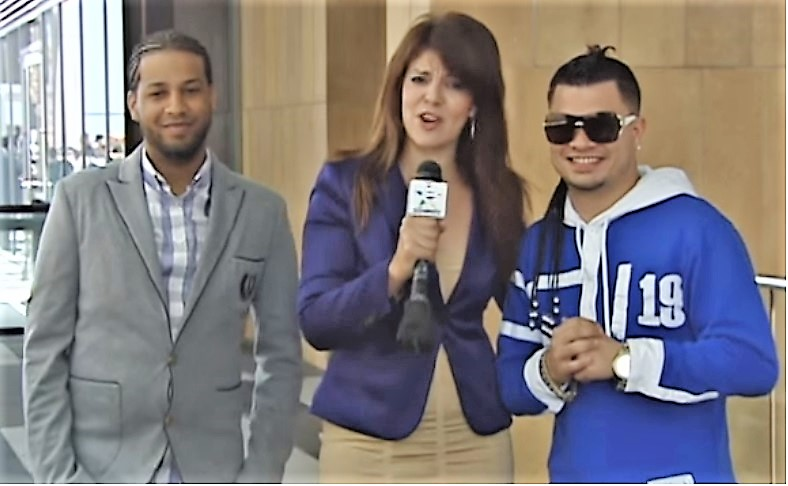
- Ortiz (left) and Muñoz (right) interviewed by Dulce Osuna in 2010

Background information
- Origin: Ponce, Puerto Rico
- Genres: Reggaeton
- Works: Discography
- Years active: 2002–present
- Labels: Live Music; Diamond; White Lion Records; Warner Music Latina; Machete Music; WY Records; Rimas
- Members: Joel Muñoz; Randy Ortiz
- Website: jowellyrandy.com

Jowell & Randy are a Puerto Rican reggaeton duo composed of Joel Muñoz Martínez (born March 3, 1982) and Randy Ortiz Acevedo (born July 16, 1983). The duo have been active since the early-2000s and have become one of the most popular acts in reggaeton. They have released three studio albums, five mixtapes, and 23 singles as of June 2017. They were also members of the short-lived group Casa de Leones alongside J King & Maximan and Guelo Star. They became the first reggaeton acts to perform in Monaco and the first reggaeton duo to do so in Australia.

== Career ==
=== 1990s–2005: Early years ===
Joel Alexis "Jowell" Muñoz Martínez was born in Springfield, Massachusetts on March 3, 1982 and grew up in Cataño, Puerto Rico, one of the island's poorest municipalities. He began to take interest in music at the age of seven listening to Puerto Rican rapper Vico C and his 1989 cassette La Recta Final. Vico C (born Luis Armando Lozada Cruz on September 8, 1971) is cited as being a pioneer of underground rap music in Puerto Rico during the mid- to late 1980s, playing a very influential role in the development of the genre. Jowell's first recording session was in 1996 for Los Fugitivos at a studio in Levittown, Puerto Rico alongside other rappers including Nicky Jam, Master Joe & O.G. Black, Camaleón, and Buru Fat Z. During the 1990s decade, most reggaeton albums composed by various artists used to be recorded in a day because of the low-budget equipments producers had at the time. Songs had to be recorded in one-take; any mistake meant having to restart the recording all over again.

Circa 1996, Jowell met Giann Arias and began organizing parties at garages, where Arias served as a DJ with Jowell rapping over the beat. Jowell began building fame from his features in various reggaeton mixtapes. Giann founded a low budget studio called Live Music in 1997 in order to record his own mixtapes with Jowell and other artists. Jowell's first commercial mixtape was The White in 1998, in which he took part performing the song "No Has Encontrado" alongside Caimito-based rapper Baby Killer, who was his duo partner for some months until Baby Killer's retirement. Later in 1997, Jowell was featured on DJ Flavor's mixtape Megatron Sex with the song "Yo Tengo Una Notita", which became popular in Puerto Rican nightclubs. Afterwards, Muñoz was tapped as an opening act for fellow reggaeton performers including Ranking Stone, Falo, Alberto Stylee, and Wiso G.

Randy Ariel Ortiz Acevedo was born in San Juan, Puerto Rico on July 16, 1983 and used to take part in a choir in a Puerto Rican church. As a child, he listened to rhythm and blues, blues, and soul music. He began his music career in 1998 and his first album appearance was on DJ Dice's mixtape In the House later that year.

Jowell and Randy first met during a friends reunion at Jowell's house. Randy was a friend of Jowell's younger brother at high school, which led to him being invited to Muñoz's house to watch a Felix "Tito" Trinidad boxing fight on television in 2000 alongside other friends and relatives. Jowell's brother told him that his friend Randy was interested in collaborating, but intimidated by Jowell's rising reggaeton career. Jowell invited Randy to record at his studio, believing in Randy's potential as a singer. However, Muñoz noticed that Randy needed improvement in the writing of his lyrics. Jowell proposed a duo, inspired by other acts including Baby Rasta & Gringo, Héctor & Tito, Wisin & Yandel, and Maicol & Manuel with Randy singing melodies and Jowell writing the rap verses. Randy's first solo album appearance was on Operación Sandunga with the song "Siéntelo Mujer", which was going to be part of the mixtape's promotion through radio and television, but was canceled after the producer was murdered.

In 2002, Jowell & Randy signed a three-year contract with Iván Joy on Diamond Music, his record label and their first album appearance was on The Majestic with the song "Todavía Recuerdo". The duo invested in a low-budget music video and managed to get the song played on Audio Activa 102.3, a radio station in western Puerto Rico, in exchange for recording jingles. In 2004, they were featured on Boy Wonder's album Chosen Few, which received a 2× platinum (Latin) certification for over 200,000 copies sold in the United States. Jowell still displays the award in his home as a tribute to the duo's first major commercial success. However, the group struggled to find attention in Puerto Rico. In 2005, Boy Wonder and Chencho Records organized a contest which consisted on an album composed by various new artists, titled El Draft. The duo R.K.M. & Ken-Y was announced as the contest's winner, chosen by fan votes. Frustrated at not being able to fulfill their goal of being famous, Jowell & Randy began to think about retiring from music.

=== Late 2005–2011: Move to White Lion and international success ===
During late 2005, while Jowell and Randy were trying to repair the former's car at a gas station, a luxury car passed by them. Randy noticed the driver was Elías de León, a well known producer in Puerto Rico, owner of White Lion Records and famous for discovering rapper Tego Calderón, duos Calle 13 and Zion & Lennox, and having executive produced various reggaeton albums since the mid-1990s. They approached de León with some of their demos. He listened to three songs and gave them his number, asking them to return his call the next day. In order to sign, the duo needed to end their three-year contract with Diamond Music. An angered Iván Joy asked for an unexpected high amount of money and some of the duo's unreleased songs. Jowell & Randy accepted and were able to sign with White Lion Records.

Jowell & Randy's first single released under their new record label was "Agresivo" featuring fellow Puerto Rican rapper Arcángel from the album La Calle, Vol. 1 in 2006. The promotion by White Lion led to the song being broadcast on all radio stations and music-related television channels in Puerto Rico. The single became the duo's first entry on Billboard, peaking at No. 27 on Latin Rhythm Airplay on September 19, 2006. On March 1, 2007, the song garnered two People Choice Reggaeton and Urban Awards for Best Collaboration of the Year and Best Song of the Year. They also won as the Revelation Duo of the Year and Randy's performance on "Soy Una Gárgola" received the Catchiest Chorus award.

The success of "Agresivo" established the duo within the reggaeton genre, leading to guest features on Zion's "Cuarto Nivel" from The Perfect Melody, Hector El Father's "Hola Bebé" from The Bad Boy: The Most Wanted Edition, Julio Voltio's "Pónmela" from En Lo Claro, and the remix version of Tito El Bambino's "Siente El Boom". "Pónmela" was included on the 2008 video game Grand Theft Auto IV and reached No. 41 on Billboard's Hot Latin Songs, on January 26, 2008. "Siente El Boom (Remix)" was also included on the video game, giving credit only to Tito El Bambino and Randy, performers of the original version. 2007's guest features by Randy on De La Ghetto's "Sensación del Bloque" and Tito El Bambino's original version of "Siente El Boom" are cited by Jason Birchmeier of AllMusic as being the collaborations which significantly improved the duo's profile internationally. "Siente El Boom" peaked at No. 14 on Billboard's Hot Latin Songs on June 16, 2007 and at No. 9 on Tropical Airplay on July 28, 2007. Randy was also featured on Tego Calderón's El Abayarde Contraataca with the single "Quitarte To", which peaked at number 10 on Hot Latin Songs on December 8, 2007.

==== Casa de Leones and Los Más Sueltos del Reggaetón ====
In 2006, Elías de León and Carlos "Karly" Rosario, A&R of White Lion Records Carlos "Karly" Rosario proposed to assemble a reggaeton quintet composed by Jowell & Randy, J King & Maximan, and Guelo Star. The group was named Casa de Leones and remained active until 2008, releasing a namesake studio album on June 26, 2007, under Black Lion Entertainment Inc and Warner Music Latina. Casa de Leones was No. 3 on Billboard's Top Latin Albums chart for their debut week on July 7, 2007 and it also reached No. 126 on the Billboard 200. The album received a five out of five score by Evan Gutierrez of AllMusic, writing that the group "may have created the most listenable reggaeton album to date". He said that Casa de Leones was a "house of songwriters" and praised the use of live instruments instead of "the typical 808 drum machine and cheap-sounding synth melodies".

The album's lead single, "No Te Veo", was released on June 12, 2007 and became a major hit across American Latin radio stations going as high as No. 4 on Hot Latin Songs on August 4, 2007 and No. 2 on Tropical Airplay on October 27, 2007. It was originally written and recorded in 2004 by Jowell, Randy, and Puerto Rican producer DJ Blass, who brought the idea from France suggesting a fusion between urban and soca music. The duo feared to release it at the time for being "different". The song was taken up again three years later after Casa de Leones was formed, and J King & Maximan and Guelo Star wrote their respective verses. "No Te Veo" received an ASCAP Latin Music Award for Urban Song of the Year in 2008 and was nominated twice for the 2008 Billboard Latin Music Awards, for Hot Latin Song of the Year and Reggaeton Song of the Year. The second single, "Shorty", was performed only by Randy and came out on October 16, 2007. The song peaked at No. 16 on Latin Rhythm Airplay on February 16, 2008. During mid-2007, the group was featured on a remix version of "Impacto" by Puerto Rican rapper Daddy Yankee. At some point in 2008, each member decided to focus on their own careers.

Jowell & Randy's debut studio album as duo, titled Los Más Sueltos del Reggaetón, was released on December 18, 2007, under White Lion and Warner Latina. The album was No. 42 on Top Latin Albums and No. 21 on Heatseeker Albums on January 19, 2008. Its lead single, "Un Poco Loca", was released during late 2007 and featured fellow reggaeton singer and songwriter De la Ghetto, but did not enter any Billboard chart. The second single, "Let's Do It", was released in March 2008 reaching No. 32 on Hot Latin Songs on April 5, 2008. Both singles were accompanied by a music video; "Un Poco Loca" was filmed at a fast food restaurant in Isla Verde, Puerto Rico and "Let's Do It" was filmed at a nightclub. The track "Agresivo II", a sequel to their first single, peaked at No. 35 on Billboard's Latin Rhythm Airplay chart on March 15, 2008.

==== El Momento ====
During early 2008, they were featured alongside De La Ghetto on the remix version of "Inalcanzable" by Mexican Latin pop group RBD. The song received a Premio Juventud for The Perfect Combo on July 17, 2008. After the expiration of their contract with Warner Latina, the duo received various offers by record labels including Sony Music Latin, Machete Music, and WY Records. During mid-2009, Jowell & Randy signed with the latter, founded by Grammy Award-winners Wisin & Yandel, who were the most interested in them, according to Jowell. On January 12, 2010, the duo released their first mixtape, titled Tengan Paciencia, which served as a prelude to their second studio album, scheduled to be released during the rest of the year. The mixtape compiled various duo and solo guest features by Jowell and Randy, as well as songs that were discarded for the final tracklist of their next album.

El Momento was released on May 4, 2010, under White Lion and WY, with Elías de León and Wisin & Yandel as executive producers. It featured reggaeton artists Wisin & Yandel, Franco El Gorila, Tico El Inmigrante, Yaviah, Gadiel, Guelo Star, Cultura Profética, De La Ghetto, Plan B, and Cosculluela. Latin Grammy Award-winner Tainy was among the producers of the album. In the United States, El Momento peaked at No. 112 on the Billboard 200 and at No. 2 on Top Latin Albums on May 22, 2010. Internationally, the album went to No. 53 in Mexico on May 25, 2010, and remained on the chart for five weeks. The album garnered the duo a People en Español Award for Best Urban Singer or Group on August 13, 2010 and a Billboard Latin Music Award nomination for Latin Rhythm Albums Artist of the Year – Duo or Group in 2011. The promotion for the album was accompanied by the El Momento World Tour from November 2010 to December 2011. In the Americas, Jowell & Randy performed in Chile, Colombia, Costa Rica, Dominican Republic, Guatemala, Honduras, Mexico, Nicaragua, Panama, Venezuela, and the United States. The duo also performed in Belgium, France, Germany, Italy, Spain and Switzerland.

The lead single, "Loco", was released on March 30, 2010, accompanied by a music video filmed in San Juan. A remix version featuring Wisin & Yandel came out on June 15, 2010. "Loco" became Jowell & Randy's biggest hit single as duo at the time, peaking at No. 22 on Billboard's Hot Latin Songs chart on August 7, 2010 and at number 3 on Tropical Airplay on August 14, 2010. The single's chart performance on Tropical Airplay garnered them a Billboard Latin Music Award nomination for Tropical Airplay Artist of the Year–Duo or Group in 2011. Four other tracks from El Momento were released as singles, accompanied by their respective music videos. "Un Booty Nuevo" (featuring Yaviah) premiered on August 16, 2010, was filmed in Maunabo, Puerto Rico and was directed by Ulysses Terrero, brother of Dominican director Jessy Terrero. "Mi Dama de Colombia" was published on November 8, 2010 and was filmed in Colombia. "Goodbye" was released on March 9, 2011, was filmed in Bogotá, Colombia, and was directed by Marlon Peña. "Solo Por Ti" (featuring Cultura Profética) premiered on August 15, 2011, was filmed in Medellín, Colombia, and directed by Flickmotion company. None of them managed to enter any Billboard chart. The track "Suave y Lento" (featuring Wisin, Tico El Inmigrante and Franco El Gorila) peaked at No. 21 on Billboard's Latin Rhythm Digital Songs chart on May 22, 2010.

=== 2012–Early 2015: Third studio album and underground phase ===
In 2011, the duo announced the release of a third studio album, titled El Momento 2. According to Jowell, it was going to be a re-issue of their previous production with remix versions of "Dile a Él" featuring Puerto Rican group N'Klabe, "Loco" featuring Wisin & Yandel; "Mi Dama de Colombia" featuring Colombian singers Pipe Bueno, Pipe Calderón, and J Balvin; "Goodbye" featuring Shakira, a Colombian singer, among others. The idea was scrapped after Wisin suggested them to make an album with brand new songs and the duo focussed entirely on their following studio album, Sobredoxis. It was going to be released under WY Records in April 2012 but the duo left the record label and the album's release date was postponed. In April 2012, Jowell & Randy became the first reggaeton duo to perform in Australia. They sang in Melbourne and Sydney, and stated that performing there was "a real honor".

In January 2012, Jowell & Randy were featured alongside Julio Voltio on "Ella Lo Que Quiere Es Salsa", a track by Víctor Manuelle, a Puerto Rican-American salsa musician, from his 13th studio album, Busco un Pueblo. Its music video, directed by Steven Tapia and filmed in Brooklyn, New York was released on July 29, 2012. The song topped the Billboard's Tropical Airplay chart on June 23, 2012, becoming the duo's first number 1 on any major Billboard chart. It also became a success on Hot Latin Songs, peaking at number 29 on July 28, 2012.

During late 2012, Puerto Rican disc jockey and producer DJ Secuaz approached Jowell & Randy to convince them to record underground reggaeton tracks. On December 25, 2012, was released Pre-Doxis, the duo's second mixtape, composed entirely by underground reggaeton songs produced by DJ Secuaz and featuring Falo, De La Ghetto, J.Q., Julio Voltio, Polaco, Luigi 21 Plus, Maicol & Manuel, Frankie Boy, Tony Tun Tun, Chyno Nyno, and Don Chezina. The album became an inflection point in their musical style, starting to support old school reggaeton acts from the 1990s through a series of underground mixtapes titled Back to the Underground as a tribute to their contribution to the genre. Both Pre-Doxis and the original Back to the Underground became popular in Puerto Rico and enhanced DJ Secuaz's career as record producer. Secuaz died on March 12, 2013, after being shot in the head on March 9. On March 17, 2013, Jowell & Randy reunited with various reggaeton acts including Julio Voltio, J King & Maximan, Falo, Yomo, Guelo Star, Isaak, Watussi, Chyno Nyno and Divino in order to record a tribute song titled "Que Descanses En Paz" (Spanish for "Rest in Peace"). The music video of the remix version of "Hey Mister", a track from Pre-Doxis, premiered on April 13, 2013, featuring Falo, Mr. Black, Los Pepe, and Watussi, and was dedicated to DJ Secuaz. It remains as their most-viewed YouTube video, with more than 80 million views.

Old school reggaeton artists Falo, Frankie Boy, Maicol & Manuel, O.G. Black and Polaco had their own Back to the Underground edition, released between October 2013 and January 2014. Jowell & Randy were involved on every edition of the series, serving as guest features and executive producers, financing various music videos. In March 2014, Jowell criticized Daddy Yankee, Don Omar and Wisin & Yandel for not having supported the project despite all of their success. During 2012, Jowell & Randy were involved in the El Imperio Nazza mixtape series with Los de la Nazza, Daddy Yankee's producers from 2008 to 2014. El Imperio Nazza: Doxis Edition was released on January 26, 2013, and featured Daddy Yankee, De La Ghetto, Ñengo Flow, Luigi 21 Plus, Polaco, Reykon, Angel & Khriz, Tony Lenta, J Álvarez, and Jory. The track "Mucha Soltura" (featuring Daddy Yankee) peaked at number 13 on Billboard's Latin Rhythm Airplay on May 25, 2013.

==== Sobredoxis ====
Their third studio album, Sobredoxis, was released on June 4, 2013, under White Lion Records and featured 3Ball MTY, Daddy Yankee, Arcángel, De La Ghetto, Farruko, Divino, and Tony Tun Tun. The album was recorded with a production budget of more than $100,000 ($106,983 in 2017 dollars). In the U.S., the album was less successful than El Momento, peaking at No. 10 on Billboard's Top Latin Albums chart on June 22, 2013. Its first three singles, "Ragga Dub", "Sobredoxis" and "Sobredosis de Amor", did not make any Billboard chart. The fourth single, "Báilalo A Lo Loco" (featuring Mexican trio 3Ball MTY), peaked at No. 12 on Billboard's Latin Rhythm Airplay chart on January 4, 2014. The fifth single, "Las Nenas Lindas", reached No. 18 on Latin Rhythm Airplay on May 10, 2014. The sixth and final single, "Living In Your World", went to No. 18 on Latin Rhythm Airplay on October 11, 2014. Jowell & Randy received a Billboard Latin Music Award nomination for Sobredoxis a Billboard for Latin Rhythm Album's Artist of the Year, Duo or Group in 2014.

The duo traveled to various countries to film the singles' music videos. "Ragga Dub" premiered on July 24, 2012, was filmed in San Juan and was directed by José "Javy" Ferrer. "Sobredoxis" was published on November 29, 2012, was shot in New York City and was directed by JC Yurnet and Steven Tapia. "Sobredosis de Amor" was released on January 31, 2013, was filmed in Buenos Aires and was directed by Santiago Ruiz and Mariano Dawidson. "Báilalo A Lo Loco" premiered on August 7, 2013, was shot in India, Puerto Rico, Dominican Republic, the U.S., Saudi Arabia, the Netherlands, Italy, Puerto Rico, and China, and was directed by Latin Grammy-Award winner director Alejandro Santiago Ciena. "Las Nenas Lindas" premiered on February 13, 2014, was filmed in Medellín, Colombia, and was directed by Andrés Villa; "Living In Your World" was published on July 14, 2014, was shot in San Andrés, Colombia, and was directed by Flickmotion company. "Isla del Encanto" premiered on February 3, 2017. The music video was filmed in San Juan and was directed by Fabula Films company.

Their second tour, titled Sobredoxis World Tour was from July 2013 to August 2014. In the Americas, Jowell & Randy performed in Argentina, Chile, Colombia, Ecuador, Honduras, Mexico, Panama, Paraguay, Peru, the U.S., and Venezuela. They also performed in France, Italy, and the Netherlands. In June 2014, they received the key to the city in La Ceiba, Honduras during the Great International Carnival of Friendship, one of the largest music festivals in Central America.

On December 13, 2014, Under Doxis, their third mixtape was released with guest artists. Its lead single, "Lo Que Quiero", peaked at number 11 on Billboard's Latin Rhythm Airplay on January 31, 2015. Three tracks from Under Doxis had a music video. "Lo Que Quiero" premiered on December 24, 2014, was directed by Fernando Lugo. "Vamo' A Busal" was released on January 7, 2015, and was directed by Lugo. The song was recorded as a promotion for their first concert at José Miguel Agrelot Coliseum on January 30, 2015. The show was the first stop on the Doxisland U.S.A. Tour, which ended in August 2015 and involved presentations in Las Vegas, Los Angeles, Houston, Dallas, Orlando, and Miami. The last music video from Under Doxis was "Pa' Los Moteles", which was filmed in Santo Domingo, Dominican Republic in August 2014, premiered on April 4, 2015, and was directed by JC Seven.

=== 2015–present: Move to independent labels and fourth studio album ===
In March 2015, the duo announced another studio album, titled Viva La Musik, through a promotional single. "Directo al Grano" was released on March 10, 2015, and featured Puerto Rican singer Ken-Y, from the duo R.K.M. & Ken-Y. Later in March, Jowell & Randy announced their first collaboration with Vico C, to whom they gave a plaque during their concert at the José Miguel Agrelot Coliseum, acknowledging his contribution to reggaeton music. Shortly afterwards, the duo stopped recording for Viva La Musik and focused on putting out a mixtape titled La Alcaldía del Perreo and respective solo albums. Jowell released two solo EPs in 2015: The Pre-Season on August 22 and Roots & Suelto on December 21. They were released with independent label Well Done Music and individually featured Wiso G, Los Perchas, Ñengo Flow, Watussi, and Trebol El Artista.

Randy released his first solo studio album, titled Roses & Wine, on October 16, 2015. The recording is a fusion of urban and r&b music. According to Randy, the idea of a R&B solo album was rejected by White Lion's work team in 2006, and by Wisin in 2009, when the duo signed with WY Records. Their contract with White Lion expired in April 2015, and Ortíz signed with Molina Records, a Puerto Rican independent label founded by Yadier Molina, a St. Louis Cardinals baseball player in Major League Baseball. Randy said that "reggaeton is not everything" and that "children should know that there are other interesting types of music with more professional lyrics". The album featured Arcángel, De La Ghetto, Álvaro Díaz, Guelo Star, John Jay, Jowell, Vinny Rivera, Ken-Y, Mackie, Maicol, and Rafa Pabón, and was mostly produced by Jorgie Milliano. Roses & Wine peaked at No. 22 on Billboard's Top Latin Albums chart on November 7, 2015.

On March 19, 2016, Jowell & Randy became the first reggaeton acts to perform in Monaco, during the Bal de la Rosa foundation gala. They were guests of Albert II, Prince of Monaco and Princess Caroline of Monaco and they talked with them about cultural themes linking Latinos to Europe. La Alcaldía del Perreo, their fifth mixtape, was released on April 22, 2016, with independent label Rimas Music and featured Tego Calderón, Alexis & Fido, De La Ghetto, Luigi 21 Plus, Ñengo Flow, and Mr. Williamz. The duo promoted the record traveling with a caravan through various municipalities in Puerto Rico. They promoted voting responsibly and criticized other reggaeton acts for performing pop music instead of perreo songs, which is the mixtape's main characteristic. La Alcaldía del Perreo peaked at No. 23 on Billboard's Top Latin Albums on May 14, 2016.

Six out of the mixtape's ten tracks had a music video. "Guadalupe" premiered on April 1, 2016, was shot in Old San Juan, Puerto Rico and was directed by Fernando Lugo, parodying the 1973 horror film The Exorcist. "La Pista Revienta" was published on June 17, 2016, was filmed in Monaco and was directed by Letour. "Me Prefieren" (featuring Ñengo Flow) was released on August 31, 2016, and was directed by DiCheco. "Un Poquito Na' Más" (featuring Tego Calderón) premiered on October 14, 2016, was shot in San Juan and was directed by Carlos Martin. The last two music videos, "Guadalupe (Jamaican Remix)" (featuring Mr. Williamz) and "Posición 4" premiered on March 11 and March 30, 2017, respectively.

Casa de Leones reunited during mid-2016 to record three tracks for J King & Maximan's upcoming studio album. "El Regreso" became the first song to be recorded by all of the members right from the start after six years. They had reunions on various occasions after their separation and were guest artists on remix versions of "Iglesia del Perreo" by Juno and "En Serio" by Yomo in 2010 and 2012, respectively. In October 2012, Jowell & Randy and Guelo Star were featured on the remix version of "Que La Nota Le Suba" by J King & Maximan, in whose outro an upcoming album by the group was mentioned. The album was scheduled to be released in 2014, but it never happened. In April 2017, J King & Maximan and Guelo Star were featured alongside Puerto Rican rapper Alexio on the second remix version of "Guadalupe" by Jowell & Randy. The quintet's first music video in nine years, "Regreso", was released on November 5, 2016, and was directed and produced by Alejandro Santiago Ciena. Casa de Leones announced a concert tour scheduled to begin during late 2017 at the José Miguel Agrelot Coliseum.

Promotion for Viva La Musik was taken up again in 2017, when they released "Bonita" featuring J Balvin on June 2, 2017. The single marked Jowell & Randy's sixth Billboard Hot Latin Songs entry and the first one in five years. It went to No. 34 on July 8, 2017. Internationally, the song was No. 19 on the Mexican Streaming Songs chart on June 15, 2017 and No. 20 in Spain on June 22, 2017. In 2020, their fourth album Viva el Perreo was released, which was the duo's first album on Rimas Entertainment.

== Discography ==
=== Studio albums ===
- Casa de Leones (2007) (with J King & Maximan and Guelo Star)
- Los Más Sueltos del Reggaetón (2007)
- El Momento (2010)
- Sobredoxis (2013)
- Viva el Perreo (2020)
- Viva la Musik (2024)
- Mazorkeo.com (2024)

=== Mixtapes ===
- Tengan Paciencia (2010)
- Pre-Doxis (2012)
- El Imperio Nazza: Doxis Edition (2013)
- Under Doxis (2014)
- La Alcaldía del Perreo (2016)

=== Solo albums ===
Jowell

- The Pre-Season (2015)
- Roots & Suelto (2015)

Randy

- Éxitos de un Romance (2011)
- Una Nota con Elegancia (2011) (with Galante)
- Roses & Wine (2015)

== Accolades ==
Jowell & Randy have received six awards out of 11 nominations, including one award out of three nominations as Casa de Leones with J King & Maximan and Guelo Star.

Ceremony	Year	Category	Recipient	Result	Ref.
ASCAP Latin Music Awards	2008	Urban Song of the Year	"No Te Veo" (as Casa de Leones)	Won	
Billboard Latin Music Awards	2008	Hot Latin of the Year	"No Te Veo" (as Casa de Leones)	Nominated	
Billboard Latin Music Awards	2008	Reggaeton Song of the Year	"No Te Veo" (as Casa de Leones)	Nominated	
Billboard Latin Music Awards	2011	Tropical Airplay Artist of the Year – Duo or Group	Jowell & Randy	Nominated	
Billboard Latin Music Awards	2011	Latin Rhythm Albums Artist of the Year – Duo or Group	Jowell & Randy	Nominated	
Billboard Latin Music Awards	2014	Latin Rhythm Albums Artist of the Year – Duo or Group	Jowell & Randy	Nominated	
Billboard Latin Music Awards	2018	Latin Rhythm Artist of the Year – Duo or Group	Jowell & Randy	Nominated	
Billboard Latin Music Awards	2020	Latin Rhythm Duo/Group of the Year	Jowell & Randy	Nominated	
Billboard Latin Music Awards	2021	Latin Rhythm Duo/Group of the Year	Jowell & Randy	Nominated	
Billboard Latin Music Awards	2021	Streaming Song of the Year	"Safaera" (with Bad Bunny & Ñengo Flow)	Nominated	
Billboard Latin Music Awards	2024	Latin Rhythm Artist of the Year, Duo or Group	Jowell & Randy	Nominated	
Billboard Latin Music Awards	2025	Latin Rhythm Artist of the Year, Duo or Group	Jowell & Randy	Nominated	
Billboard Latin Music Awards	2026	Latin Rhythm Artist of the Year, Duo or Group	Jowell & Randy	Pending	
People Choice Reggaeton and Urban Awards	2007	Revelation Duo of the Year	Jowell & Randy	Won	
People Choice Reggaeton and Urban Awards	2007	Best Song of the Year	"Agresivo" (with Arcángel)	Won	
People Choice Reggaeton and Urban Awards	2007	Best Collaboration of the Year	"Agresivo" (with Arcángel)	Won	
Premios Juventud	2008	The Perfect Combo	"Inalcanzable (Remix)" (with RBD and De La Ghetto)	Won	
Premios Juventud	2025	Best Urban Mix	"Puro Guayeteo" (with Wisin & Don Omar)	Nominated	
Premios Juventud	2026	Favorite Group or Duo of the Year	Jowell & Randy	Nominated	
Premios People en Español	2010	Best Urban Singer or Group	Jowell & Randy	Won	

== Tours ==
- El Momento World Tour (2010–2011)
- Sobredoxis World Tour (2013–2014)
- Doxisland USA Tour (2015)

== See also ==
- List of Puerto Ricans
- Casa de Leones
