= Casa de Leones (album) =

Studio album by Casa de Leones
- Released: June 26, 2007
- Genre: Reggaeton, dancehall, salsa, reggae en Español
- Length: 86:33
- Label: Warner Bros., White Lion Records; 232444
- Producer: Oscar de León, Elías de León, DJ Giann, Dexter & Mister Greenz

Jowell & Randy chronology
Casa de Leones (2007)	Los Más Sueltos del Reggaetón (2007)

Professional ratings
Review scores
Source	Rating
AllMusic	5/5 stars

Casa de Leones (English: House of Lions) is the eponymous debut album by Puerto Rican reggaeton quintet Casa de Leones and was released on June 26, 2007 by Warner Bros. and Black Lion Records.

== Track listing ==
=== Disc 1 "Casa de Leones" ===
1. "Pa' Mi Ponce" (Feat. La India, Arcángel, Ñejo & Dalmata, Voltio) (Written by L. Caballero, M. DeJesus, H. Padilla, C. Crespo, J. Muñoz, J. Bonilla, R. Ortiz) — 5:25
2. "Esto Es Perreo" (Written by M. DeJesus, H. Padilla, J. Muñoz, J. Bonilla, R. Ortiz) — 4:08
3. "Potrona" (Written by M. DeJesus, H. Padilla, J. Muñoz, J. Bonilla, R. Ortiz) — 3:14
4. "Trambo" (Written by M. DeJesus, H. Padilla, J. Muñoz, J. Bonilla, R. Ortiz) — 4:29
5. "Dale con Presión" (Written by M. DeJesus, H. Padilla, J. Muñoz, J. Bonilla, R. Ortiz) — 3:37
6. "Shorty" (Randy) (Written by J. Muñoz, R. Ortiz) — 4:06
7. "A Veces Pienso" (Written by M. DeJesus, H. Padilla, J. Muñoz, J. Bonilla, R. Ortiz) — 4:32
8. "Biggie Booty Lady" (Written by M. DeJesus, H. Padilla, J. Muñoz, J. Bonilla, R. Ortiz) — 4:31
9. "No Te Veo" (Written by J. Bonilla, M. DeJesus, J. Muñoz, H. Padilla, R. Ortiz) — 4:48
10. "Ponte Ahí" (Written by J. Bonilla, M. DeJesus, J. Muñoz, H. Padilla, R. Ortiz) — 5:04
11. "Listen to Me Baby" (Written by M. DeJesus, H. Padilla, J. Muñoz, J. Bonilla, R. Ortiz) — 3:50
12. "There's No Reason" (Written by M. DeJesus, H. Padilla, J. Muñoz, J. Bonilla, R. Ortiz) — 3:50
13. "Yo Sé" (Guelo Star) (Written by M. DeJesus) — 2:47
14. "Qué Pasó Yal" (Written by M. DeJesus, H. Padilla, J. Muñoz, J. Bonilla, R. Ortiz) — 3:26

=== Disc 2 "Jowell & Randy" ===
1. "Sácala a Bailar"
2. "Dos Palgas"
3. "Soltura"
4. "Te Ando Buscando" (V. Felix, J. Muñoz, R. Ortiz) — 3:24
5. "Eh Oh Eh Oh" (J. Muñoz, S. S. Rivera, R. Ortiz) — 3:34
6. "Que Te Vaya Bien" (Randy) (M. A. DeJesus, R. Ortiz) — 4:02
7. "Velándote" (J. Muñoz, R. Ortiz) — 3:58
8. "Ese Amor" (J. Muñoz, R. Ortiz) — 3:39

== Charts ==
Chart (2007)	Peak position
U.S. Billboard 200	126
U.S. Billboard Top Latin Albums	3
U.S. Billboard Latin Rhythm Albums	2

== Certifications ==
Region	Certification	Certified units/sales
United States (RIAA)	Platinum (Latin)	60,000^{‡}
^{‡} Sales+streaming figures based on certification alone.
