= The Movie Man =

2012 studio album by Guelo Star

Studio album by Guelo Star
- Released: November 6, 2012
- Recorded: 2011–2012
- Genre: Reggaeton
- Length: 1:03:13
- Label: Live
- Producer: Hyde el Verdadero Químico; Yai y Toly los Nativos; Dexter y Mr. Greenz; Lelo y Jaz-Z los Hitmen; Santana the Golden Boy; Duran the Coach; DJ Giann; Diesel; Predikador; Jamsha; Gaby Music; DJ Blass; DJ Luian; DJ June

Guelo Star chronology
Yums: The Mixtape (2012)	The Movie Man (2012)

The Movie Man is the debut album by Guelo Star. It was released digitally on November 6, 2012.

== Track listing ==
No.	Title	Producer(s)	Length
1.	"Quién Mata (intro)"	Live Music	3:32
2.	"Guayándola"	Hyde el Verdadero Químico; Lelo & Jazz los Hitmens	3:26
3.	"Quiere Vacilón" (featuring Angel & Khriz)	Hyde el Verdadero Químico; Santana the Golden Boy	4:37
4.	"Contra la Pared"	Hyde el Verdadero Químico; Santana the Golden Boy	4:20
5.	"Acho" (featuring Voltio)	Hyde el Verdadero Químico; Diesel	4:20
6.	"Mala Decisión"	Predikador; Duran the Coach	3:59
7.	"No Digas Nada" (featuring la India)	Hyde el Verdadero Químico; Jamsha	4:49
8.	"Partela en 3"	Yai & Toly los Nativos	3:11
9.	"Déjala Caer (Siente el Boom 2)" (featuring Jowell & Randy)	Hyde el Verdadero Químico; Gaby Music; DJ Giann; Dexter & Mr Greenz	4:46
10.	"Cumpleaños"	Yai & Toly los Nativos	3:47
11.	"Ella Es Especial" (featuring De la Ghetto)	Live Music	3:59
12.	"Yo Soñé"	Yai & Toly los Nativos; Duran the Coach	3:54
13.	"La Nena No Está" (featuring J-King & Maximan)	Hyde el Verdadero Químico	3:54
14.	"La Fantasía"	Dexter; DJ Blass	3:14
15.	"No Tengo Más Na"	Hyde el Verdadero Químico; DJ Giann; Dexter & Mr. Greenz	3:24
16.	"Brick City" (featuring Redman)	Lelo y Jazz los Hitmens; DJ Giann; DJ Luian; DJ June	4:19
17.	"Mala Decisión (remix)" (featuring De la Ghetto)	Predikador; Duran the Coach	3:47
