= Guelo Star =

Puerto Rican reggaeton singer

- Birth name: Miguel Antonio de Jesús Cruz
- Also known as: El escritor de escritores (in English, "The writer of writers")
- Born: September 19, 1981 (age 43); Ponce, Puerto Rico
- Genres: Reggaeton; urban
- Occupations: Rapper; singer; lyricist; producer
- Years active: 1999–present
- Labels: One Star; Live; White Lion; Glad Empire; La Pelicula Viviente (owner and CEO); Universal

Miguel de Jesús (born September 19, 1981, Ponce, Puerto Rico), also known as Guelo Star, is a Puerto Rican reggaeton rapper, singer, lyricist, occasional producer and promoter. In his musical career, he has worked with artists such as Daddy Yankee, Pipe Calderón, De La Ghetto, Jowell & Randy, Wisin, Don Omar and Ivy Queen. He has been recognized three times for his compositions at the ASCAP Awards.

== Professional career ==
He began his music career writing and producing for other artists, establishing himself in the world of reggaeton and rap. Initially, he was a part duo of Jamsha & Guelo Star: Los Puti-Puerkos. He started out working with DJ Blass on albums like @ria 51: Aliados Al Escuadron (1999) and Reggaeton Sex Vol. 2 (2000). In 2007, he joined forces with duos, Jaime Borges and Héctor Padilla (J-King & Maximan), and Randy Ortiz and Joel Muñoz (Jowell & Randy) and were taken on by the reggaeton producer of White Lion Records, Elías De León. They later became known as "Casa de Leones".

Their first special studio/compilation album was released on June 26, 2007, and their single hit song No Te Veo reached #4 in The Billboard Hot Latin Charts.

As of 2008 Casa de Leones stopped performing as a group, however, since this was a result of poor contract negotiation and not of any animosity within the group, sometimes they meet. The then ex-5 members are still signed by White Lion and still have a close working relationship. Later in 2008 he has been the person in charge of writing several themes of the musical album of the De La Ghetto in his debut titled massacre musical. Over the years, Miguel de Jesus Cruz, the singer's first name, has been part of some of the most popular hits. Winner of three consecutive years of the ASCAP Award as composer of the year for songs like "Soy una gargola" by Randy (2007), "Siente el boom" by Tito El Bambino feat. Randy (2007), "No te veo" (2007) and "Quitarte to '" by Tego Calderón feat. Randy (2008).

On November 6, 2012 he released his debut album The Movie Man under the HoLLyWooD Boyz Digital Media Group label in association with White Lion Records. It features collaborations from Jowell and Randy, La India, De la Ghetto, J-King & Maximan. Guelo Star returns to his position as one of the most relevant composers of the moment when he composed one of the most successful songs of the moment, "Amame o matame", performed by Ivy Queen and Don Omar. After the incredible acceptance of his compositions and after months of negotiations, his management office, GLAD Empire, was able to close the business with Universal Music Publishing Group, for the editorial management of its extraordinary catalog.

With a catalog that exceeds 500 compositions, Guelo Star has left his mark on numerous issues with important exponents such as De La Ghetto, Daddy Yankee, J Alvarez, J Balvin, Jory Boy, MC Ceja, Gotay, Dálmata and recently arrived the opportunity to compose the next single by Wisin & Yandel, "Todo Comienza En La Disco"."It is a great honor for me to be part of the Universal Music Publishing Group. I have always received a good treatment from them and I have a lot of work to show my team that I came to win with a lot of muse, concentration and, above all, discipline" commented Guelo Star. Currently, Guelo Star is finishing his long-awaited album, "The Movie Man 2". His new album will be released soon via the GLAD Empire label. In 2021, he released his own version of the Farruko's song titled "Pepas".

== Discography ==
=== Studio albums ===
- 2012: The Movie Man
- 2015: The Movie Under
- 2018: The Movie Man 2

=== Mixtapes ===
- 2012: Yums
- 2013: Yums 2

=== Collaborative albums ===
- 2007: Casa De Leones (with Jowell & Randy, JKing & Maximan)

== Song credits ==
Year	Song	Performer(s)	Album	Notes
2005	"Sandunguero"	Cheka Featuring Guelo Star	Sandunguero Hits	
2006	"Agresivo"	Jowell & Randy Featuring Arcángel	La Calle (Vol. 1)	
2006	"Siente El Boom"	Tito "El Bambino" Featuring Randy	Chosen Few II: El Documental	
2006	"Soy Una Gargola"	Randy	Gargolas 5: The Next Generation	
2006	"Agresivo (Official Remix)"	Jowell & Randy Featuring Arcángel, Daddy Yankee and De La Ghetto	King of Remix	
2007	"Agresivo II"	Jowell & Randy	Los Más Sueltos del Reggaetón	
2007	"No Te Veo"	Jowell & Randy	Los Más Sueltos del Reggaetón	
2007	"Que Te Vaya Bien (Remix)"	Randy	Los Más Sueltos del Reggaetón	
2007	"Siente El Boom (Official Remix)"	Tito "El Bambino" Featuring Jowell & Randy and De La Ghetto	The Boss of The Block (Vol. 1)	
2007	"El Bum Bum"	Tito "El Bambino"	It's My Time	
2007	"No Quiero Soltarte"	Tito "El Bambino"	It's My Time	
2007	"Quitarte To'"	Tego Calderon Featuring Randy	El Abayarde Contra-Ataca (Edición Especial)	
2007	"Veo"	Zion	El Pentágono	
2007	"Momento Que Te Vi"	De La Ghetto	Masacre Musical	
2007	"No Me Digas Que No"	De La Ghetto	Masacre Musical	
2007	"Perdición"	De La Ghetto	Masacre Musical	
2007	"Como El Viento"	De La Ghetto	Masacre Musical	
2007	"Así Es"	De La Ghetto Featuring Guelo Star	Masacre Musical	
2007	"Royal Rumble (Se Van)"	Daddy Yankee, Don Omar, Wise Da' Gangsta, Hector "El Father", Yomo, Zion, Wisin, Franco "El Gorila", Arcángel, Alexis and El Roockie	Mas Flow: Los Benjamins (La Continuación) (CD 2)	
2007	"Welcome To My Crib"	Randy	Mas Flow: Los Benjamins (La Continuación) (CD 2)	
2007	"Cuarta Nivel"	Zion Featuring Jowell & Randy	The Perfect Melody	
2011	"Veneno"	Gocho	Mi Música	
2011	"Lento"	Gocho Featuring Guelo Star	Mi Música	
2011	"Todas Las Solteras"	Gocho Featuring Jory and Ñengo Flow	Mi Música	
2012	"Amigas Celosas"	Pipe Calderon Featuring Guelo Star	Se Lleva En La Sangre	
2012	"Ella Lo Que Quiere Es Salsa"	Victor Manuelle Featuring Voltio, Jowell & Randy	non-album single	
2012	"Amigas Celosas (Official Remix)"	Pipe Calderon Featuring Guelo Star, Randy and Arcángel	Una Nota Con Elegancia	
2013	"Una Semana"	De La Ghetto Featuring Guelo Star	Chosen Few Urbano: Continues	
2013	"Sensual Mujer"	Jenny La Sexy Voz	Chosen Few Urbano: Continues	
2014	"Sensual Mujer (Official Remix)"	Jenny La Sexy Voz Featuring Mr. Vegas, Chiko Swagg & Mr. Saik	La Sexy Mixtape	
2018	"Todo Comienza En La Disco"	Wisin & Yandel Featuring Daddy Yankee	Victory	
2018	"Amame o Matame"	Ivy Queen Featuring Don Omar	The Queen Is Here	

"Notes"

- ^{^a} signifies a Lyricist or Songwriter
- ^{^b} signifies a Composer
