= No Te Veo =

Single by Casa de Leones

from the album Casa de Leones and Los Más Sueltos del Reggaetón
- Released: May 2007
- Recorded: 2006–2007
- Genre: Soca, champeta, pop, dance, reggaeton
- Length: 4:48
- Label: Warner Music Latina
- Songwriter: Miguel A. de Jesús (Guelo Star)
- Producer: DJ Blass

Casa de Leones singles chronology
"No Te Veo" (2007)	"Shorty" (2007)

"No Te Veo" (I Don't See You in English), is the debut single by reggaeton group Casa de Leones, released in May 2007, by Warner Music Latina of Warner Bros. Records.

== Music style ==
The song known for its upbeat dance-club sound and chosen instrumentation based on Calypso music, giving the song its own unique sound in the genre of reggaeton.

== Chart performance ==
In the U.S. the song peaked at #4 on the Billboard Hot Latin Songs chart.

=== Chart positions ===
Chart (2007)	Peak Position
U.S. Billboard Hot Latin Songs	4

== Versions/Remixes ==
The original version of this song only features Jowell & Randy. The "Casa de Leones" version featuring Guelo Star, J-King & Maximan is considered a remix. Another remix features Randy and Lorna, and a third with Jowell & Randy and Swizz Beatz, Pitbull, Rupee & Nina Sky. There's also one with Jowell & Randy and Lee Wilson, and another with Jowell & Randy, J-King, Guelo Star, and Rupee. Blend Dj Bob, Way Fell {The Best of los más sueltos}.

== See also ==
- List of Billboard Latin Rhythm Airplay number ones of 2007
