= Live Music =

- Founded: 1996
- Founder: Jowell & Randy
- Genre: Reggaeton
- Country of origin: Puerto Rico

Live Music is a reggaeton company founded by DJ Giann and Jowell in 1996.

== Artists ==
- Jowell & Randy
- Yomo
- Franco "El Gorila"

== Music Producer ==
- DJ Giann
- Mr.Greenz
- Dexter & Mr.Greenz (as a production duo)

== Former Producers & Artists ==
- DJ Blass
- DJ Secuaz (1989 - 2013)
- Dirty Joe
- Lelo & Jazzy (Los Hitmen)
- El Polakan
- De La Ghetto
- Galante "El Emperador"

== Albums/Mixtapes Released After 2011 ==
- Randy "Nota Loca" & Galante "El Emperador" - Una Nota Con Elegancia (2011)
- Guelo Star - Yums: The Mixtape (2012)
- Galante "El Emperador" - Tu Juguetito Sexual (2012)
- Guelo Star - The Movie Man (2012)
- Dj Secuaz - Zona De Perreo (2012)
- Jowell & Randy - Pre Doxis (2013)
- Jowell & Randy - Imperio Nazza: Doxis Edition (2013)
- Jowell & Randy - Sobredoxis (2013)
- Back To The Underground : The Mixtape (2013)
- Falo - Back To The Underground : Falo-Edition (2013)
- OG Black - Back To The Underground: El Francotirador Edition
- Maicol & Manuel - Back To The Underground: Yakaliando Edition
- Back To The Underground La Realeza Edition (2013)
- Watussi - La Revelacion Del Under (2013)
- Guelo Star - Yums 2 (2013)
- Back To The Underground - Polakan Edition (2013)
- Back To The Underground - Frankie Boy Edition (2013)
