= Sobredoxis =

2013 studio album by Jowell & Randy

Studio album by Jowell & Randy
- Released: June 4, 2013 (Standart); TBA - 2014 (Reloaded)
- Recorded: 2011–2013
- Genre: Reggaeton
- Label: White Lion Records, Live Music
- Producer: DJ Giann, Mr. Greenz, Dexter, The Hitmen, DJ Blass, Los de la Nazza, 3Ball MTY, Predikador, Haze, DJ Luian, Marioso

Jowell & Randy chronology
El Momento (2010)	Sobredoxis (2013)	Viva el Perreo (2020)

Singles from Sobredoxis
- 1. "Sobredoxis de Amor" Released: February 12, 2013; 2. "Báilalo a Lo Loco" Released: August 7, 2013; 3. "Ragga-Dub"; 4. "Las Nenas Lindas"

Sobredoxis is the third studio album of the reggaeton duo Jowell & Randy. It was released on June 4, 2013. Originally, it was to be titled El Momento 2, but after a meeting with record labels, it was decided to change the name. The album includes collaborations with Daddy Yankee, Arcángel, 3Ball MTY, De La Ghetto, Farruko, Tony Tun Tun and Divino. It debuted at number ten on the Latin Albums chart and number one on the Latin Rhythm Albums chart.

== Track listing ==
1. Sobredoxis
2. Báilalo a Lo Loco (feat. 3Ball MTY)
3. Las Nenas Lindas
4. Living In Your World
5. Mucha Soltura (feat. Daddy Yankee)
6. Tú Eres Mala
7. Acomódate (feat. Arcángel & De La Ghetto)
8. Prendan Los Motores (feat. Farruko)
9. Isla Del Encanto
10. ¿Cómo Hago? (feat. Divino)
11. Lo Que Te Gusta (feat. Tony Tun Tun)
12. Sobredoxis de Amor
13. Ragga-Dub

== Chart performance ==
Chart (2013)	Peak position
US Latin Albums (Billboard)	10
US Latin Rhythm Albums (Billboard)	1
