= Don Chezina =

American reggaeton artist (born 1976)

- Born: Ricardo García Ortiz; 1976 (age 49–50); Georgia, United States
- Genres: Reggaeton, Hip hop
- Years active: 1991–present
- Label: Don Che Record's / Diririri Business
- Website: www.donchezina.com

Don Chezina (born Ricardo García Ortiz; 1976) is an American singer, producer, and talent scout of Hip hop, reggae and reggaeton music. He is known for his high, nasal voice and fast rapping along with his most famous song "Tra Tra Tra", which in 1998 became one of the first reggaeton songs to become popular in the United States. Chezina is considered one of the pioneers and was one of the biggest names in the early days of the reggaeton genre.

== Discography ==
Álbumes de estudio

- 1997: Bien guillao de gangster
- 1999: Mi trayectoria
- 2003: Don Fichureo
- 2013: It's the Don

Álbumes en vivo

- 2001: Live From Miami

Álbumes recopilatorios

- 1999: Éxitos
- 2004: Mi trayectoria (2)

Mixtapes/EP

- 2007: My Life
- 2008: Pal pueblo
- 2014: Chezination
- 2015: Durakuz con Maicol Superstar
- 2019: Born Ready
- 2020: The Original Don
- 2022: Esencia y tendencia
