= Casa de Leones =

Puerto Rican reggaeton group

- Genres: Reggaeton
- Years active: 2006–2008; 2010; 2012–2013
- Labels: Warner Latina; White Lion
- Members: Jowell & Randy; Guelo Star; J-King & Maximan

Casa de Leones (English: House of Lions), also known as Los Leones, were a Puerto Rican reggaeton supergroup.

== Professional career ==
The members of the group are: Guelo Star (Miguel A. De Jesús), J-King & Maximan (Jaime Borges Bonilla and Héctor Padilla), and Jowell & Randy (Randy Ortiz and Joel Muñoz). All five members began their music career writing and producing for other artists, establishing them in the world of reggaeton and rap. In 2007, they joined forces with Dr Diubell and were taken on by the reggaeton producers of Black Lion Records, Carlos “Karly” Rosario & Elías De León.

Their first studio/compilation album was released on June 26, 2007, and their single hit song No Te Veo MLP reached #1 in The Billboard Hot Latin Charts. Rolling Stone ranked No Te Veo as their #23 best reggaeton song of all time in 2022.

In 2008 Los Leones stopped performing as a group; however, since this was a result of poor contract negotiation and not animosity within the group, sometimes they continue to meet and perform. The five former members are still signed by White Lion and still have a close working relationship.

On September 14, 2010, Guelo Star confirmed on his Twitter account that the members of Los Leones had been getting together for the production of the album Casa De Leones 2. He announced a 2014 release for the album, but this has not been confirmed yet.

On July 7, 2012, all the members of Los Leones were added on the remix to Yomo's single "En Serio". This was the first time in two years that the artists were reunited on a track. On October 6, 2012: Casa De Leones reunited once again for a track made by members J-King & Maximan, "Que La Nota Le Suba" was remixed with the added vocals of Guelo Star, Jowell & Randy.

== Discography ==
=== Albums ===
Artists	Album	Release date
Jowell & Randy, Guelo Star, J-King & Maximan	Casa De Leones	26 June 2007

=== Singles ===
Single	
"Shorty" (only Randy)	Did not chart

=== Jowell & Randy albums ===
Studio

Album	Release date
Los Más Sueltos del Reggaetón	December 18, 2007
El Momento	May 4, 2010
Sobredoxis	June 4, 2013

Mixtapes

Album	Release date
Tengan Paciencia	January 12, 2010
Pre-Doxis	December 25, 2012
El Imperio Nazza: Doxis Edition	January 26, 2013

=== J King & Maximan albums ===
Studio

Album	Release date
Los Superhéroes	June 15, 2010
Los Sucesores	August 20, 2013

Mixtapes

Album	Release date
Querían Perreo	November 19, 2011

=== Guelo Star albums ===
Studio

Album	Release date
Guelo Star Singles	October 10, 2006
The Movie Man	November 6, 2012

Mixtapes

Album	Release date
La Película Viviente	November 6, 2008
Yums	April 11, 2012
Yums, Part 2	September 13, 2013
