= Yomo =

Puerto Rican–American musician (born 1980)

- Born: Jose Alberto Torres Abreu; June 17, 1980 (age 46); Chicago, Illinois, U.S.
- Origin: Humacao, Puerto Rico
- Genre: Reggaeton
- Occupations: Singer; arranger
- Instrument: Vocals
- Years active: 2004–present
- Labels: Gold Star Music (2004–2008); Black Pearl International Records (2008–2016); Rottweilas Inc. (2009–2011); Anormales Music (2013–present); JMA Music (2014–present)

Jose Alberto Torres Abreu (born June 17, 1980), known professionally as Yomo, is an American singer and arranger.

== Early life ==
He was raised in Humacao. Before becoming a professional artist, he used to work as a handyman on Puerto Rico's Palmas Del Mar Beach Resort.

== Discography ==
=== Albums ===
- 2008: My Destiny
