= Los Extraterrestres World Tour =

2008–2009 concert tour by Wisin & Yandel

- Tour by Wisin & Yandel
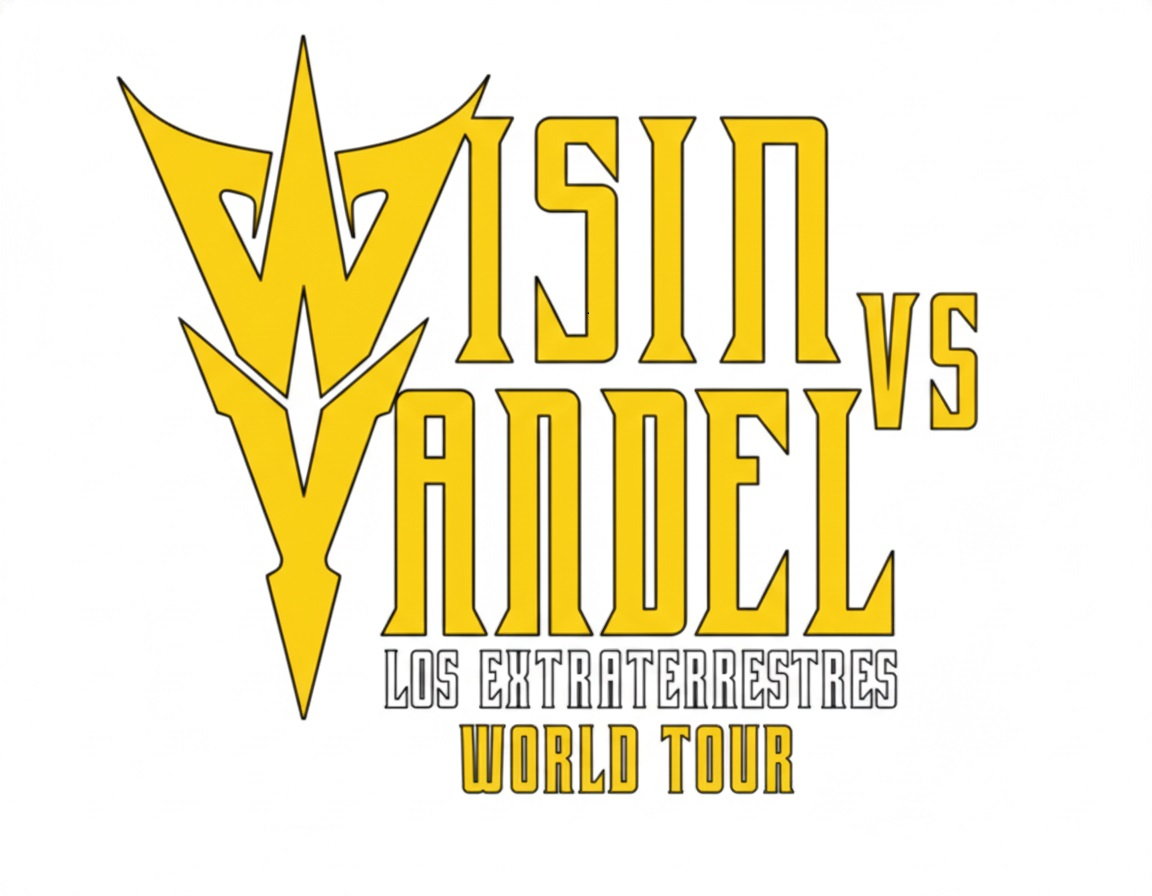
- Promotional image for the tour
- Associated album: Wisin vs. Yandel: Los Extraterrestres
- Start date: February 2, 2008
- End date: March 31, 2009
- Legs: 2
- No. of shows: 77

Wisin & Yandel concert chronology
- Los Vaqueros Tour (2007); Los Extraterrestres World Tour (2008–09); La Revolución World Tour (2009–10)

The Los Extraterrestres World Tour is the third world by the reggaeton duo Wisin & Yandel to support their fifth studio album Wisin vs. Yandel: Los Extraterrestres. This tour included their first official arena tour in The United States and their first presentation as headliners in Mexico, Paraguay and Argentina. During the tour the album was re-released and for this reason some concerts were renamed under the title Los Extraterestres: Otra Dimension.

== Overview ==
In the original plans, the tour was expected to end in December in Bolivia and afterwards the tour was expected to start another tour in relation to their 10th anniversary in music in early 2009. However, the concerts in Bolivia were pushed back to January 2009 and those plans were scrapped.

The tour contained their first arena tour in the United States. The concert in Los Angeles set a record in attendance by a Hispanic act at the Staples Center. The New York Times gave a positive review to their concert at New York's Madison Square Garden and titled the article "Two Romeos Romance the World to an Adrenalized Reggaetón Beat". Also, it was reported that the concert was sold out.

The duo closed the Viña 2008 Internacional Festival, becoming just the third reggaeton act to perform at the festival. In Mexico, they performed at the National Auditorium, becoming the first reggaeton act to do so. Around 10,000 fans showed up to their concert in Lima.

== Set list ==
=== Original ===
On February 2, 2008, Wisin & Yandel in the Paseo de la Virgen in Cantaura, Venezuela,

Setlist:

1. Intro
2. "Pegao"
3. "Ahora Es"
4. "Mírala Bien"
5. "Pam Pam"
6. "Noche de Entierro"
7. "Nadie Como Tu"
8. "Noche de Sexo"
9. "Yo Te Quiero"
10. "Una Noche Mas"
11. "Él Telefono"
12. "No Se De Ella (My Space)"
13. "Electrica" with Gadiel
14. "Rakata"
15. "Sexy Movimiento"

=== Revamped ===
On March 27, 2009, Wisin & Yandel in the Auditorio Nacional in Mexico City, Mexico,

Setlist:

1. WY records - Los extraterrestres the concert intro
2. "Pam Pam"
3. "Presion"
4. "Aprovechalo"
5. "Mírala Bien"
6. "Mayor Que Yo"
7. "Noche de Entierro"
8. "Pegao"
9. "Nadie Como Tu"
10. "Tu Cuerpo Me Llama" with Gadiel
11. "Dime Que Te Paso"
12. "Lloro Por Ti"
13. "Yo Te Quiero"
14. "¿Por Qué Me Tratas Así?"
15. "Ahora Es"
16. "Llamé Pa' Verte"
17. "El Teléfono"
18. "Dame Un Poquito"
19. "Torre De Babel" with David Bisbal
20. "Tus Sabanas"
21. "Rakata"
22. "Permitame"
23. "Sexy Movimiento"
24. "Siguelo"
25. "Me Estas Tentando"

== Tour dates ==
Date	City	Country	Venue
Latin America
February 2, 2008 (Note: This concert was part of Feria Candelaria 2008)	Cantaura	Venezuela	Paseo de la Virgen
February 3, 2008 (Note: This concert was part of Carnavales Internacional de Puerto Ordaz)	Puerto Ordaz	Venezuela	La Ruta del Calipso
February 25, 2008 (Note: This concert was part of Viña del Mar 2008 International Festival)	Viña del Mar	Chile	Quinta Vergara Amphitheater
March 6, 2008	San Juan	Puerto Rico	Coliseo de Puerto Rico
March 7, 2008	San Juan	Puerto Rico	Coliseo de Puerto Rico
March 8, 2008	San Juan	Puerto Rico	Coliseo de Puerto Rico
April 24, 2008	Medellín	Colombia	Plaza de Toros La Macarena
April 25, 2008 (Note: This concert was co-headlined by Jowell & Randy)	Bogotá	Colombia	Simón Bolívar Park
April 26, 2008 (Note: This concert was co-headlined by Jowell & Randy)	Cali	Colombia	Plaza de Toros Cañaveralejo
April 27, 2008 (Note: This concert was part of Fiesta Broadway 2008)	Los Angeles	United States	Fiesta Broadway
May 18, 2008	Panama City	Panama	Figali Convention Center
North America
May 23, 2008	Boston	United States	Orpheum Theatre
May 24, 2008	Wallingford	United States	Toyota Oakdale
May 30, 2008	Los Angeles	United States	Staples Center
May 31, 2008	San Jose	United States	Union Event Center
June 7, 2008	New York	United States	Madison Square Garden
June 27, 2008	Orlando	United States	House Of Blues
June 28, 2008	Miami	United States	American Airlines Arena
Latin America
July 4, 2008	Valencia	Venezuela	Forum de Valencia
July 5, 2008	Maracaibo	Venezuela	Palacio de Eventos
July 6, 2008	Maracay	Venezuela	Casa Gómez
July 11, 2008	Mérida	Venezuela	Centro Italo Venezolano
July 12, 2008	San Cristóbal	Venezuela	Plaza Monumental de Toros de Pueblo Nuevo
July 13, 2008	Caracas	Venezuela	Poliedro de Caracas
July 18, 2008	Puerto La Cruz	Venezuela	Estadio Jose Antonio Anzoategui
July 19, 2008	Puerto Ordaz	Venezuela	Polideportivo Cachamay
August 16, 2008	Salt Lake City	United States	E-Center
August 20, 2008	Mexico City	Mexico	Teatro Metropólitan
August 21, 2008	Guadalajara	Mexico	Teatro Diana
August 22, 2008	Monterrey	Mexico	Arena Monterrey
August 23, 2008	Mexico City	Mexico	Teatro Metropolitan
August 24, 2008	Mexico City	Mexico	Centro de Convenciones Tlalnepantla
August 28, 2008 (Note: This concert was part of Yellow Pass Medalla 2008)	Mayaguez	Puerto Rico	Palacio de Recreación y Deportes
August 30, 2008	Managua	Nicaragua	Estadio Nacional Soberania
August 31, 2008	San Jose	Costa Rica	Autódromo La Guácima
September 12, 2008 (Note: This concert was part of Barquisimeto Top Festival 2008)	Barquisimeto	Venezuela	Complejo Ferial Bicentenario
September 13, 2008	Maturin	Venezuela	Estadio Monumental de Maturin
September 20, 2008	Asuncion	Paraguay	Olimpia Club
September 23, 2008	Buenos Aires	Argentina	Estadio Luna Park
September 24, 2008	Buenos Aires	Argentina	Estadio Luna Park
September 25, 2008	Lima	Peru	Explanada Monumental
September 26, 2008	Arequia	Peru	Jardín de la Cerveza
September 27, 2008 (Note: This concert was part of KQ Concert 2008)	San Juan	Puerto Rico	Coliseo de Puerto Rico
October 17, 2008	Santiago	Chile	Movistar Arena
October 18, 2008	Santiago	Chile	Movistar Arena
October 23, 2008	Guayaquil	Ecuador	Coliseo Voltaire Paladines Polo
October 24, 2008	Quito	Ecuador	Coliseo General Rumiñahui
November 1, 2008 (Note: This concert was part of Encendido de Luces)	Maracaibo	Venezuela	Estadio José Pachencho Romero
November 4, 2008	Puebla	Mexico	Auditorio Siglo XXI
November 5, 2008	Queretaro	Mexico	Plaza de Toros Santa Maria
November 6, 2008 (Note: This concert was part of Los 40 Principales)	Mexico City	Mexico	Azteca Stadium
November 7, 2008	Léon	Mexico	Poliforum de Leon
November 8, 2008	Chihuahua	Mexico	Estadio Manuel L. Almanaza
November 9, 2008	Ciudad Juárez	Mexico	Plaza de Toros
November 21, 2008	Guatemala City	Guatemala	Estadio del Ejercito
November 26, 2008 (Note: This concert was part of 10 Años The Show)	San Juan	Puerto Rico	Coliseo de Puerto Rico
December 27, 2008 (Note: This concert was part of Party of Barbosa)	Bayamón	Puerto Rico	Residencial Barbosa
January 5, 2008 (Note: This concert was part of Showcase Medalla 2008)	San Juan	Puerto Rico	Hotel San Juan & Casino
January 8, 2008 (Note: This concert was co-headlined by Marc Anthony)	Manizales	Colombia	Estadio Palo Grande
January 10, 2009 (Note: This concert was co-headlined by Marc Anthony)	Cartagena	Colombia	Estadio Jaime Moron Leon
January 14, 2009	Santa Cruz de la Sierra	Bolivia	Estadio Ramón Tahuichi Aguilera
January 16, 2009	La Paz	Bolivia	Estadio Hernando Siles
January 17, 2009	Cochabamba	Bolivia	Estadio Felix Capriles
January 30, 2009	Valencia	Venezuela	Forum de Valencia
January 31, 2009 (Note: This concert was part of Solid Festival 2009)	Caracas	Venezuela	Hipodromo La Rinconada
February 1, 2009	Maracaibo	Venezuela	Palacio de Eventos
March 13, 2009	Santiago de los Caballeros	Dominican Republic	Gran Arena del Cibao
March 14, 2009	Santiago de los Caballeros	Dominican Republic	Gran Arena del Cibao
March 19, 2009	Veracruz	Mexico	Estadio Universitario Beto Ávila
March 20, 2009	Guadalajara	Mexico	Plaza Nuevo Progreso
March 21, 2009	Monterrey	Mexico	Arena Monterrey
March 22, 2009	Piedras Negras	Mexico	Estadio de Beisbol Sección 123
March 27, 2009	Mexico City	Mexico	National Auditorio Nacional
March 29, 2009	Mexico City	Mexico	Paraíso del Abuelos
March 31, 2009	Mexico City	Mexico	Palacio de los Deportes

=== Box office data ===
City	Country	Attendance	Box office
San Juan	Puerto Rico	37,689 / 39,357 (96%)	$2,398,560
Miami	United States	12,779 / 13,405 (95%)	$769,080
New York	United States	11,952 / 13,046 (92%)	$977,515
Total		62,420 / 65,808 (95%)	$4,145,155

== Cancelled concerts ==
List of cancelled concerts, showing date, city, country, venue, and reason for cancellation
Date	City	Country	Venue	Reason
August 7, 2008	Rome	Italy	Stadio Flaminio	Illness
August 8, 2008	Milan	Italy	San Siro	Illness
August 9, 2008	Antwerp	Belgium	Sportpaleis	Illness
August 10, 2008	London	England	The O2 Arena	Illness
January 9, 2009	Bogotá	Colombia	Coliseo el Capin	Illness
February 14, 2009	Buenos Aires	Argentina	Estadio Luna Park	Unknown
March 18, 2009	Tuxtla Gutiérrez	Mexico	Estadio de Béisbol Panchón Contreras	Unknown
March 28, 2009	Tlaxcala	Mexico	Plaza de Toros de Tlaxcala	Unknown
March 29, 2009	Mexico City	Mexico	Centro de Espectáculos de Tultepec	Unknown
April 1, 2009	Acapulco	Mexico	Centro de Convenciones Acapulco	Unknown
