= Los Vaqueros Tour =

2007 concert tour by Wisin & Yandel

- Tour by Wisin & Yandel
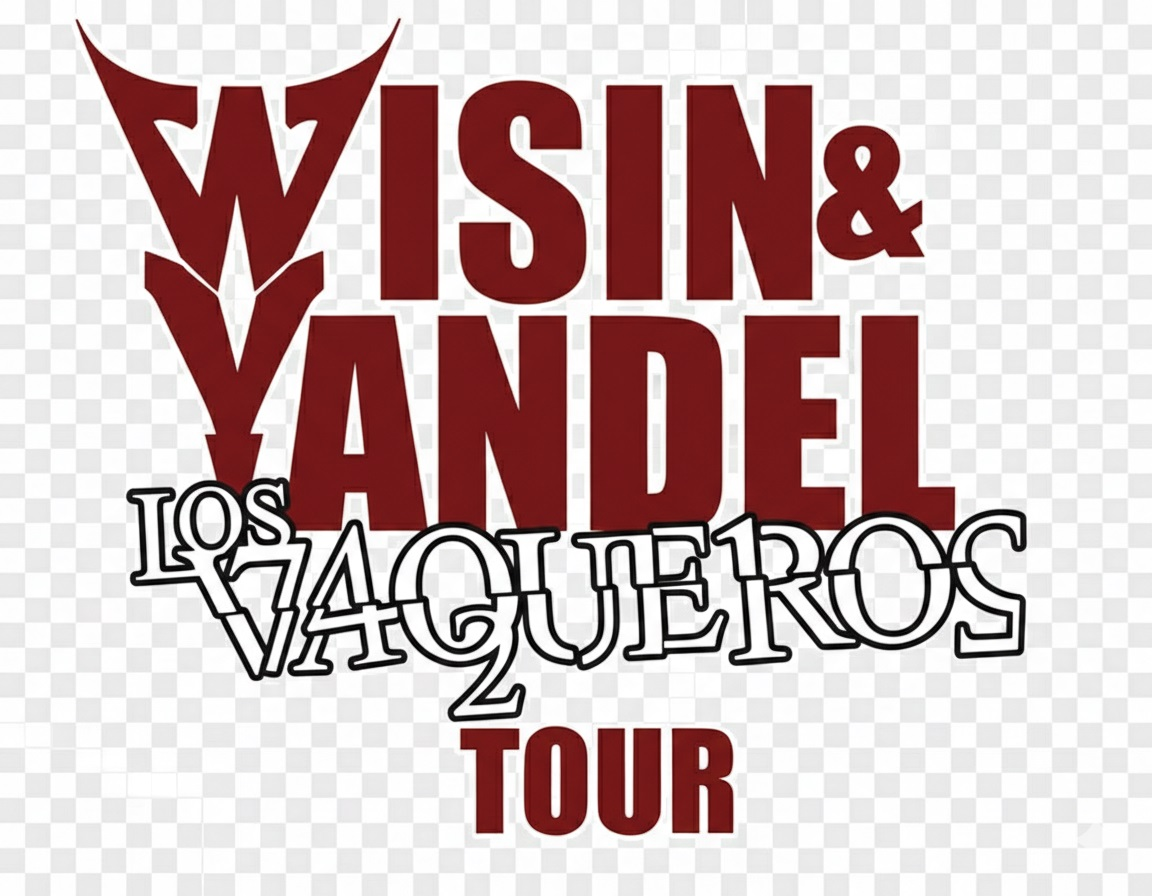
- Promotional image for the tour
- Associated album: Los Vaqueros
- Start date: March 2, 2007
- End date: October 13, 2007

Wisin & Yandel concert chronology
- Pa'l Mundo Tour (2006–07); Los Vaqueros Tour (2007); Los Extraterrestres World Tour (2008–09)

The Los Vaqueros Tour is the second concert tour by reggaeton duo Wisin & Yandel to support their album Los Vaqueros. The tour consisted of a series of concerts and festivals in Latin America and included the concert titled "La Triologia del genero" with reggaeton superstar Don Omar and had the highest attendance for a reggaeton concert at the time with around 80,000 fans.

== Set List ==
Wisin & Yandel in the Airport Higuerote in Higuerote, Venezuela on April 6, 2007.

1. "Pegao"
2. "Mírala Bien"
3. "Mayor Que Yo (Parte 2)"
4. "Mayor Que Yo"
5. "Noche de Entierro"
6. "Te Suelto El Pelo"
7. "Yo Te Quiero"
8. "Noche de Sexo"
9. "No Me Dejes Solo"
10. "El Telefono"
11. "Electrica" with Gadiel
12. "Un Viaje" with Gadiel
13. "Burn It Up"
14. "Pam Pam"
15. "Nadie Como Tu" with Don Omar
16. "No Se De Ella (MySpace)" with Don Omar

== Tour dates ==
| Date | City | Country | Venue |
|---|---|---|---|
| March 2, 2007 (Note: This concert was co-headlined Tres Pesos, Farina y Jhonier and Sammy) | Bogotá | Colombia | Simon Bolivar Park |
| March 3, 2007 | Cali | Colombia | Plaza de Toros Cañaveralejo |
| March 4, 2007 | Pereira | Colombia | Estadio Hernán Ramírez Villegas |
| March 16, 2007 | San Juan | Puerto Rico | Coliseo de Puerto Rico |
| March 17, 2007 | San Juan | Puerto Rico | Coliseo de Puerto Rico |
| March 18, 2007 | San Juan | Puerto Rico | Coliseo de Puerto Rico |
| March 30, 2007 (Note: This concert was part of 3rd Annual Reggaeton Festival) | Trujillo | Peru | Estadio Mansiche |
| March 31, 2007 | Lima | Peru | Jockey Club |
| April 1, 2007 (Note: This concert was co-headlined with Don Omar) | Santiago | Chile | Estadio Nacional Julio Martínez Prádanos |
| April 6, 2007 | Higuerote | Venezuela | Aeropuerto de Higuerote |
| April 7, 2007 (Note: This concert was part of Semana Santa) | Porlamar | Venezuela | |
| April 20, 2007 | San Jose | United States | Provident Credit Union Event Center |
| April 21, 2007 (Note: This concert was part of Calibash 2007) | Los Angeles | United States | Honda Center |
| May 11, 2007 | Fairfax | United States | Patriot Center |
| May 17, 2007 | Atlantic City | United States | Trump Plaza Hotel and Casino |
| May 19, 2007 | Chicago | United States | UIC Pavilion |
| June 9, 2007 (Note: This concert was part of La Kalle 105.9 FM Reggaeton Festival.) | New York City | United States | Shea Stadium |
| June 15, 2007 | San Cristóbal | Venezuela | Plaza Monumental de Toros de Pueblo Nuevo |
| June 16, 2007 | Mérida | Venezuela | Centro Italo |
| June 24, 2007 | Miami | United States | American Airlines Arena |
| June 29, 2007 | Manizales | Colombia | Estadio Palogrande |
| June 30, 2007 | Tulua | Colombia | Estadio Doce de Octubre. |
| July 1, 2007 (Note: This concert was co-headlined by Ricardo Arjona and Marc Anthony) | Santo Domingo | Dominican Republic | Felix Sanchez Olympic Stadium |
| July 20, 2007 | Puerto Ordaz | Venezuela | Centro Italo |
| July 21, 2007 | Maracaibo | Venezuela | Estadio Luis Aparicio El Grande |
| July 22, 2007 | Caracas | Venezuela | Poliedro de Caracas |
| August 23, 2007 (Note: This concert was part of Yellow Pass Medalla) | Mayagüez | Puerto Rico | Palacio de Recreación y Deportes |
| September 15, 2007 (Note: This concert was part of Día Nacional del Género) | San Juan | Puerto Rico | Hiram Bithorn Stadium |
| October 12, 2007 (Note: This concert was part of Reventón Bohemia 2007) | Santo Domingo | Dominican Republic | Herrera International Airport |
| October 13, 2007 (Note: This concert was part of Ferias Internacionales de Barinas) | Barinas | Venezuela | Parque Ferial |
