= Tomando Control: Live =

Live album by Wisin & Yandel
- Released: September 25, 2007
- Recorded: March 17, 2007 (San Juan, Puerto Rico)
- Venue: Coliseo de Puerto Rico José Miguel Agrelot
- Genre: Reggaeton
- Length: 56:37
- Label: WY Records, Machete

Wisin & Yandel chronology
Los Vaqueros: Wild Wild Mixes (2007)	Tomando Control: Live (2007)	Wisin vs. Yandel: Los Extraterrestres (2007)

Professional ratings
Review scores
Source	Rating
Allmusic	3/5 stars

Tomando Control: Live (English: Taking Control) is a live album by Puerto Rican duo Wisin & Yandel. It was released on September 25, 2007. It is based on their March 17, 2007, concert at Coliseo de Puerto Rico José Miguel Agrelot in San Juan, Puerto Rico.

== Track listing ==
No.	Title	Length
1.	"Intro: Tomando Control"	0:58
2.	"Pegao"	3:03
3.	"Eléctrica" (featuring Gadiel)	2:47
4.	"Mírala Bien"	2:47
5.	"Entrégate"	3:22
6.	"Atrévete" (featuring Franco "El Gorila")	3:01
7.	"Fue W."	2:29
8.	"Llamé Pa' Verte (Bailando Sexy)"	2:29
9.	"Chambea (Sensación)" (featuring Tony Dize)	2:32
10.	"Sin Él"	2:33
11.	"Yo Te Quiero" (featuring Luis Fonsi)	4:39
12.	"Quiero Hacerte El Amor"	1:59
13.	"Tabla"	3:20
14.	"El Teléfono" (featuring Héctor el Father)	4:49
15.	"Noche de Sexo" (featuring Romeo Santos)	3:45
16.	"Nadie Como Tú" (featuring Don Omar)	3:47
17.	"No Sé de Ella "MySpace"" (featuring Don Omar)	4:31
18.	"Pam Pam"	3:46

== Chart performance ==
Chart (2007)	Peak position
US Billboard 200	184
US Latin Rhythm Albums (Billboard)	1
US Top Latin Albums (Billboard)	7

== See also ==
- List of number-one Billboard Latin Rhythm Albums of 2007
