= La Revolución: Live =

- Cover of the album that contains both volumes.

Live album by Wisin & Yandel
- Released: September 21, 2010
- Recorded: December 2009; José Miguel Agrelot Coliseum (San Juan, Puerto Rico)
- Genre: Reggaeton
- Length: 48:34 (Volume One); 46:28 (Volume Two)
- Label: WY, Machete
- Producer: Wisin & Yandel (also executive); Edgar Andino, José "El Profesor" Gómez, Victor Martínez, Ernesto F. Padilla, Marcos "Tainy" Masis, Nely (El Arma Secreta)

Wisin & Yandel chronology
W & Y Presentan: WY Records: Lo Mejor De La Compañía (2010)	La Revolución: Live (2010)	Los Vaqueros: El Regreso (2011)

Alternative cover
- Volume One cover

Alternative covers
- Volume Two cover

Singles from La Revolución: Live
- 1. "Estoy Enamorado" Released: July 12, 2010

La Revolución: Live ("The Revolution") is the second live CD/DVD album by the Puerto Rican reggaeton/hip hop duo Wisin & Yandel released on September 21, 2010, through Machete Music. The album also include six tracks recorded in studio, including the first and only single "Estoy Enamorado". The album was released in a one album only digitally, and in two volumes in CD format.

== Background ==
This album was recorded in San Juan, Puerto Rico at the José Miguel Agrelot Coliseum in December 2009. The album include live songs performed on their La Revolución World Tour, as well six unreleased songs recorded on studio, including "Irresistible" also included on the Step Up 3D soundtrack album and the first single "Estoy Enamorado". The album was set to be released first on August 17, back later to September 14, but finally the album's release date was on September 21, 2010.

== Reception ==
=== Commercial performance ===
On the Billboard charts the volume for each album was charted separately, the Volume 1 debuted at number 5 on the Top Latin Albums while on the Top Rap Albums the album debuted at number 16. The Volume 2 debuted at number 6 on the Top Latin Albums and number 17 Top Rap Albums, one position lower in each chart than the Volume 1.

=== Critical response ===
Professional ratings
Review scores
Source	Rating
AllMusic – Volume One	link
AllMusic – Volume Two	link

About the Vol. 1, David Jeffries from Allmusic said "Those who have experienced Wisin & Yandel's intense live show know what excitement they're in for here, but the concept of splitting the reggaeton duo's La Revolución Live set into two volumes calls for a little guidance. Both volumes feature highlights from the La Revolución tour -- a definite high point of the duo's career -- followed by three new studio tracks [...] This is a desirable package on its own, but it works best when paired with the equally pleasing Vol. 2." About the Vol. 2 he said "The live portion of Vol. 2 features a live band that adds some organic flavor to the synthetic backing tracks. Their flashy -- and fairly trashy -- collaboration with R&B star T-Pain, gives Vol. 2 the slight edge over Vol. 1, but both work best when paired for the full La Revolución Live experience."

== Promotion ==
Two songs were released on July 12, 2010, through iTunes, the first single "Estoy Enamorado" and "Irresistible" a song included on the Step Up 3D soundtrack album, added later on La Revolución: Live track listing.

== Singles ==
"Estoy Enamorado" was selected as the first and only single from the album released digitally on July 12, 2010. The music video was premiered on August 19, 2010, it was directed by Wisin & Yandel's long-time director, Jessy Terrero, a music video for the Remix featuring Mexican-American singer-songwriter Larry Hernández was also filmed, but not yet released.

== Track listing ==
- The duo wrote or co-wrote every song on the album. Others who worked on the songs are given below.

=== Volume One ===
No.	Title	Writer(s)	Length
1.	"La Revolución (Intro)" (Live)	Victor Martinez, Ernesto Padilla	2:14
2.	"Pam Pam" (Live)	Gonzalo Hermosa, Ulises Gonzalez, Marcos Masis	3:42
3.	"Ahora Es" (Live)	Martinez, Padilla, Francisco Galan	2:47
4.	"Noche de Sexo" (Live) (featuring Romeo)	Josias De La Cruz, Anthony Santos	3:50
5.	"Prrrum (Remix)" (Live) (featuring Cosculluela)	José Cosculluela, DJ Blass, Gary Henderson, Victor Alexis Rivera	3:28
6.	"Lloro Por Ti (Remix)" (Live) (featuring Enrique Iglesias)	Enrique Iglesias	4:19
7.	"Besos Mojados" (Live)	Victor Cabrea, Francisco Saldaña	4:45
8.	"Me Estás Tentando" (Live)	Padilla, Jose Gomez	4:33
9.	"Abusadora" (Live)	Masis	4:06
10.	"Estoy Enamorado"	Gomez, Martinez, Ernesto F. Padilla	4:31
11.	"Tumbao" (featuring De La Ghetto)	Masis, De La Ghetto	4:37
12.	"La Reunión De Los Vaqueros [Los Vaqueros: El Regreso]" (featuring Cosculluela, Tego Calderón, De La Ghetto & Franco "El Gorilla")	Martinez, F. Padilla, Tego Calderón, Luis F. Cortes, Cosculluela, De La Ghetto	5:32

=== Volume Two ===
No.	Title	Writer(s)	Length
1.	"Encendio" (Live)	Martinez, F. Padilla	3:52
2.	"Pegao" (Live)	Martinez, F. Padilla	2:56
3.	"Ella Me Llama (Remix)" (Live) (featuring Akon)	Padilla, Aliaune Thiam, Christian M. Colon	4:35
4.	"All Up 2 You" (Live) (featuring Akon & Aventura)	Masis, Santos, Thiam	3:49
5.	"Gracias a Tí" (Live)	Gomez	3:49
6.	"Descará (Remix)" (Live) (featuring Yomo)	Raymond Diaz, Jose Torres	5:21
7.	"Rakata" (Live)	De La Cruz, Saldaña	2:45
8.	"Te Siento" (Live)	F. Padilla	4:17
9.	"Sexy Movimiento" (Live)	Martinez, F. Padilla	3:20
10.	"Irresistible"	Masis	3:07
11.	"Vamos a Pasarla Bien"	Martinez, F. Padilla	4:18
12.	"Reverse Cowgirl (Remix)" (featuring T-Pain)	Faheem Najm, Robert Brent, Jeremy Michael Coleman, Jon Gordon, Daniel Johnson, Courtney Vantrease	4:16

=== Both Volumes Together ===
No.	Title	Writer(s)	Length
1.	"La Revolución (Intro)" (Live)	Juan Luis Morera, Llandel Veguilla, Victor Martinez, Ernesto Padilla	2:14
2.	"Pam Pam" (Live)	Morera, Veguilla, Gonzalo Hermosa, Ulises Gonzalez, Marcos Masis	3:42
3.	"Ahora Es" (Live)	Morera, Veguilla, Martinez, Padilla, Francisco Galan	2:47
4.	"Noche de Sexo" (Live) (featuring Romeo)	Morera, Veguilla, Josias De La Cruz, Anthony Santos	3:50
5.	"Prrrum (Remix)" (Live) (featuring Cosculluela)	José Cosculluela, DJ Blass, Gary Henderson, Morera, Veguilla, Victor Alexis Rivera	3:28
6.	"Lloro Por Ti (Remix)" (Live) (featuring Enrique Iglesias)	Enrique Iglesias	4:19
7.	"Besos Mojados" (Live)	Morera, Veguilla, Victor Cabrea, Francisco Saldaña	4:45
8.	"Me Estás Tentando" (Live)	Morera, Veguilla, Padilla, Jose Gomez	4:33
9.	"Abusadora" (Live)	Morera, Veguilla, Masis	4:06
10.	"Encendio" (Live)	Morera, Veguilla, Martinez, F. Padilla	3:52
11.	"Pegao" (Live)	Morera, Veguilla, Martinez, F. Padilla	2:56
12.	"Ella Me Llama (Remix)" (Live) (featuring Akon)	Morera, Veguilla, Padilla, Aliaune Thiam, Christian M. Colon	4:35
13.	"All Up 2 You" (Live) (featuring Akon & Aventura)	Morera, Veguilla, Masis, Santos, Thiam	3:49
14.	"Gracias a Tí" (Live)	Morera, Veguilla, Gomez	3:49
15.	"Descará (Remix)" (Live) (featuring Yomo)	Morera, Veguilla, Raymond Diaz, Jose Torres	5:21
16.	"Rakata" (Live)	Morera, Veguilla, De La Cruz, Saldaña	2:45
17.	"Te Siento" (Live)	Morera, Veguilla, F. Padilla	4:17
18.	"Sexy Movimiento" (Live)	Morera, Veguilla, Martinez, F. Padilla	3:20
19.	"Estoy Enamorado"	Morera, Veguilla, Gomez, Martinez, Ernesto F. Padilla	4:31
20.	"Tumbao" (featuring De La Ghetto)	Morera, Veguilla, Masis, De La Ghetto	4:37
21.	"La Reunión De Los Vaqueros" (featuring Cosculluela, Tego Calderón, De La Ghetto & Franco "El Gorilla")	Morera, Veguilla, Martinez, F. Padilla, Tego Calderón, Luis F. Cortes, Cosculluela, De La Ghetto	5:32
22.	"Irresistible"	Morera, Veguilla, Masis	3:07
23.	"Vamos a Pasarla Bien"	Morera, Veguilla, Martinez, F. Padilla	4:18
24.	"Reverse Cowgirl (Remix)" (featuring T-Pain)	Morera, Veguilla, Faheem Najm, Robert Brent, Jeremy Michael Coleman, Jon Gordon, Daniel Johnson, Courtney Vantrease	4:16

=== Special edition ===
No.	Title	Writer(s)	Length
1.	"La Revolución (Intro)" (Live)	Victor Martinez, Ernesto Padilla	2:14
2.	"Quítame El Dolor" (Live)	Marcos Masis	3:20
3.	"Pam Pam" (Live)	Gonzalo Hermosa, Ulises Gonzalez, Marcos Masis	3:42
4.	"Encendio" (Live)	Martinez, F. Padilla	3:52
5.	"Pegao" (Live)	Martinez, F. Padilla	2:56
6.	"Ahora Es" (Live)	Martinez, Padilla, Francisco Galan	2:47
7.	"Ella Me Llama (Remix)" (Live) (featuring Akon)	Padilla, Aliaune Thiam, Christian M. Colon	4:35
8.	"All Up 2 You" (Live) (featuring Akon & Aventura)	Masis, Santos, Thiam	3:49
9.	"Noche de Sexo" (Live) (featuring Romeo)	Josias De La Cruz, Anthony Santos	3:50
10.	"He Querido Quererte" (Live) (performed by Franco El Gorila & Tico El Inmgrante)	Luis Francisco Cortes, Martinez, Padilla	3:26
11.	"Psiquiátrica Loca" (Live) (performed by Franco El Gorila & Tico El Inmgrante)	Luis Francisco Cortes, Martinez, Padilla	2:39
12.	"Suave & Lento" (Live) (featuring Jowell & Randy, Franco El Gorila & Tico El Inmgrante)	Nesty, Victor "El Nazi"	5:36
13.	"Descará (Remix)" (Live) (featuring Yomo)	Raymond Diaz, Jose Torres	5:21
14.	"Prrrum (Remix)" (Live) (featuring Cosculluela)	José Cosculluela, DJ Blass, Gary Henderson, Victor Alexis Rivera	3:28
15.	"Síguelo" (Live)	Gomez, Nesty, Victor "El Nazi"	3:23
16.	"Dame Un Poquito" (Live)	Gomez, RKO	3:49
17.	"Dime Que Te Pasó" (Live)	Gomez, Nesty, Victor "El Nazi"	7:45
18.	"Gracias a Tí" (Live)	Gomez	3:49
19.	"Lloro Por Ti (Remix)" (Live) (featuring Enrique Iglesias)	Enrique Iglesias	4:19
20.	"Yo Te Quiero" (Live)	Nesty, Victor "El Nazi", Tainy	4:05
21.	"Besos Mojados" (Live)	Victor Cabrea, Francisco Saldaña	4:45
22.	"Imagínate" (Live) (featuring T-Pain)	Nesty, Victor "El Nazi", Tainy	4:26
23.	"Mirala Bien" (Live) (featuring T-Pain)	Nesty, Victor "El Nazi", Tainy	3:45
24.	"Rakata" (Live)	De La Cruz, Saldaña	2:45
25.	"Permitame" (Live)	Nesty, Victor "El Nazi", Tainy	3:05
26.	"Sexy Movimiento" (Live)	Martinez, F. Padilla	3:20
27.	"Te Siento" (Live)	F. Padilla	4:17
28.	"Me Estás Tentando" (Live)	Padilla, Jose Gomez	4:33
29.	"Abusadora" (Live)	Masis	4:06

== Charts ==
=== La Revolucion: Live, Vol. 1 ===
Chart (2010)	Peak position
Mexican Albums Chart	25
Mexican International Chart Albums	11
US Top Latin Albums	5
US Top Rap Albums	16

=== La Revolucion: Live, Vol. 2 ===
Chart (2010)	Peak position
Mexican Albums Chart	30
Mexican International Chart Albums	15
US Top Latin Albums	6
US Top Rap Albums	17

Notes:

- Each volume was charted separately

== See also ==
- List of number-one Billboard Latin Rhythm Albums of 2010
