= La Revolución World Tour =

2009–2010 concert tour by Wisin & Yandel

- Tour by Wisin & Yandel
- Associated album: La Revolución
- Start date: July 30, 2009
- End date: December 11, 2010
- Legs: 5
- No. of shows: 81

Wisin & Yandel concert chronology
- Los Extraterrestres World Tour (2008–09); La Revolución World Tour (2009–10); Los Vaqueros: El Regreso World Tour (2011)

The La Revolución World Tour is the fourth world tour by the reggaeton duo Wisin & Yandel to support their sixth studio album La Revolución. It consisted of three legs including 16 shows in the United States, and was the duo's largest arena tour at the time. The tour was planned to end on December 6, 2009, in San Juan, Puerto Rico. However, the tour was expanded to 2010 due to high demand, including a second arena leg in the United States. During the stop in Argentina and Puerto Rico, the concerts were recorded and later released as La Revolución: Live. Performed in big and large venues in Latin America, it was the duo's most extense and successful tour.

== Overview ==
=== Stage and design ===
The duo stated that the stage in Puerto Rico cost around US$100,000. "The idea behind the theme was that this was a revolution in music," said lighting/scenic/video designer Todd Roberts of Visions Lighting LLC (Placenta, California), who worked with Wisin y Yandel's personal lighting designer/programmer David Ayala, video director Alfredo Cifredo and production manager Eggie Allende to design and create the set. "They wanted to the look of the stage to be real industrial. We used a lot of large oversized chain, and a lot of metals." As far as the lighting went, "they wanted it to look as big as possible," said Roberts, "with a small budget."

At Luna Park in Buenos Aires, the stage was 360 degrees. It was the first time in 27 years that an artist had used this type of stage at the venue; the previous was Frank Sinatra. Because this reason, the concert was named "La Revolución en 360".

=== Critical reception ===
Sarah Godfrey from The Washington Post attended the concert in Washington, D.C. at the Patriot Center and gave a positive review, stating, "the performance itself was mostly the pair asserting their own stardom".

=== Commercial reception and attendance ===
Following the announcement of the first leg in the United States, over 60% of tickets were sold in the first weeks. Ticket prices were between $45 and $95. The concerts at New York, Los Angeles, Miami, San Francisco and Washington, D.C. were sold out. Due to high demand by fans, a second leg was announced, including the first concert in Canada, which was sold out. In Mexico, the tour was a box office success, and in Mexico City a second date was added at Palacio de los Deportes due to high demand. In Medellin, Colombia, local media reported an attendance of around 12,000 fans. In Medonza, Argentina, attendance was around 10,000 and 12,000 in Tucuman. Over 50,000 fans showed of to the clousure. During the third leg in Latin America, over 100,000 were sold between Paraguay and Argentina. The concert in Pereira, Colombia sold over 16,000 tickets. Wisin & Yandel were chosen to be the last and main act on the third and final day of Festival Presidente 2010 in Santo Domingo.

== Tour dates ==
Date	City	Country	Venue
Latin America
July 30, 2009	Guatemala City	Guatemala	Expocenter del Gran Tikal Futura
July 31, 2009	San Salvador	El Salvador	Gimnasio Nacional Adolfo Pineda
August 2, 2009 (Note: This concert was part of EXO festival 2009)	Mexico City	Mexico	Angel of Independence
August 6, 2009	San Luis Potosí	Mexico	Coliseum Convention Center
August 7, 2009	Aguascalientes	Mexico	Plaza de Toros Monumental de Aguascalientes
August 8, 2009	Mexico City	Mexico	Palacio de los Deportes
August 9, 2009	Mexico City	Mexico	Palacio de los Deportes
August 13, 2009	Guadalajara	Mexico	Alternative Forum
August 14, 2009	Puebla	Mexico	Auditorio Siglo XXI
August 27, 2009	Asuncion	Paraguay	Club Olimpia
September 1, 2009	Córdoba	Argentina	Estadio Orfeo
September 2, 2009	Buenos Aires	Argentina	Luna Park
September 3, 2009	Buenos Aires	Argentina	Luna Park
September 4, 2009	Rosario	Argentina	Hipódromo de Rosario
September 6, 2009	Santiago	Chile	Movistar Arena
North America
September 17, 2009	Miami	United States	American Airlines Arena
September 19, 2009	Atlanta	United States	Gas South Arena
September 20, 2009	Orlando	United States	Amway Center
September 24, 2009	Chicago	United States	Allstate Arena
October 1, 2009	Washington, D.C.	United States	Patriot Center
October 2, 2009	New York	United States	Madison Square Garden
October 8, 2009	San Francisco	United States	The Warfield
October 9, 2009	San Francisco	United States	The Warfield
October 10, 2009	Los Angeles	United States	Staples Center
October 16, 2009	Phoenix	United States	Jobing.com Arena
October 17, 2009	San Diego	United States	Pechanga Arena
October 18, 2009	Las Vegas	United States	Orleans Arena
October 22, 2009	Houston	United States	Escapade 2001
October 23, 2009	McAllen	United States	Dodge Arena
October 24, 2009	Dallas	United States	Nokia Theatre
October 25, 2009	Laredo	United States	Sames Auto Arena
Latin America II
October 30, 2009 (Note: This concert was part of Lara Top Festival)	Barquisimeto	Venezuela	Complejo Ferial Barquisimeto
November 20, 2009	Guayaquil	Ecuador	Estadio Alberto Spencer
November 21, 2009	Ambato	Ecuador	Estadio Bellavista
December 4, 2009	San Juan	Puerto Rico	Coliseo de Puerto Rico
December 5, 2009	San Juan	Puerto Rico	Coliseo de Puerto Rico
December 6, 2009	San Juan	Puerto Rico	Coliseo de Puerto Rico
December 7, 2009	San Juan	Puerto Rico	Coliseo de Puerto Rico
December 11, 2009	Tijuana	Mexico	Estadio Caliente
December 13, 2009	Cancún	Mexico	Estadio de Béisbol Beto Ávila
January 20, 2010	Monterrey	Mexico	Arena Monterrey
January 21, 2010	Pachuca de Soto	Mexico	Polideportivo De La UAEH
January 22, 2010	Villahermosa	Mexico	Parque Tabasco
January 23, 2010	Mérida	Mexico	Estadio Carlos Iturralde Rivero
January 30, 2010 (Note: This concert was part of Solid Festival 2010)	Caracas	Venezuela	Estacionamiento del Poliedro de Caracas
February 7, 2010 (Note: This concert was part of Maratón de San Blaston)	Coamo	Puerto Rico	TBA
February 16. 2010 (Note: This was part second Annual International Carvanal of Puerto Cabello)	Puerto Cabello	Venezuela	Aeropuerto Internacional Bartolomé Salom
March 4, 2010	Valencia	Venezuela	Forum de Valencia
March 18, 2010	Medellin	Colombia	Plaza de toros La Macarena
March 19, 2010 (Note: This concert was co-headlined Jowell & Randy)	Pereira	Colombia	Estadio Hernan Ramirez Villegas
March 20, 2010	Cali	Colombia	Estadio Pascual Guerrero
March 21, 2010	Tulua	Colombia	Estadio 12 de Octubre
March 26, 2010	Bogota	Colombia	Carmel Club
March 27, 2010 (Note: This concert was co-headlined by J Balvin, Osmar Perez and Fariz Ortiz)	Monteria	Colombia	Estadio de Monteria
May 7, 2010	Valencia	Venezuela	Forum Valencia
May 14, 2010	Asuncion	Paraguay	Jockey Club
May 15, 2010	Córdoba	Argentina	Estadio Orfeo
May 16, 2010	Mendoza	Argentina	Estadio Andes Talleres
May 19, 2010	Neuquen	Argentina	Casino Magic
May 22, 2010	Buenos Aires	Argentina	Estadio Diego Armando Maradona
May 23, 2010	Corrientes	Argentina	Anfiteatro Cocomarola
May 25, 2010	Tucumán	Argentina	Estadio de Atlético
United States II
July 22, 2010	El Paso	United States	El Paso County Coliseum
July 23, 2010	Austin	United States	Frank Ervwin Center
July 24, 2010	New Orleans	United States	UNO Lakefront Arena
July 25, 2010	Tampa	United States	Amalia Arena
July 30, 2010	Atlantic City	United States	Trump Taj Mahal
July 31, 2010	Hartford	United States	XL Center
August 1, 2010	Charlotte	United States	Bojangles Coliseum
August 4, 2010	Toronto	Canada	Powerade Centre
August 6, 2010	Minneapolis	United States	Target Center
August 7, 2010	Hammond	United States	Horseshoe Hammond Casino
August 8, 2010	Kansas City	United States	T-Mobile Center
August 11, 2010	Denver	United States	Wells Fargo Theatre
August 13, 2010	Sacramento	United States	Sleep Train Arena
August 14, 2010	Anaheim	United States	Honda Center
Latin America III
August 29, 2010 (Note: This concert was part of Festival Presidente de la Musica Latina 2010)	Santo Domingo	Dominican Republic	Felix Sanchez Olympic Stadium
September 25, 2010 (Note: This concert was part of KQ Concert 2010)	San Juan	Puerto Rico	Coliseo de Puerto Rico
October 10, 2010	Comodoro	Argentina	Estadio Municipal de Comodoro Rivadavia
October 11, 2010	Salta	Argentina	Estadio Padre Ernesto Martearena
October 23, 2010 (Note: This was part of the festival EXO Concert 2010)	Mexico City	Mexico	Palacio de los Deportes
November 9, 2010 (Note: This concert was part of AXE Solamente una Noche)	Las Vegas	United States	Aria Resort & Casino
December 1, 2010 (Note: This concert was part of EXOTampico 2010)	Tampico	Mexico	Centro de Convenciones y Exposiciones Expo Tampico
December 2, 2010	Monterrey	Mexico	Arena Monterrey

=== Box office data ===
City	Country	Attendance	Box office
Los Angeles	United States	11,987 / 11,987 (100%)	$636,609
San Juan	Puerto Rico	50,033 / 52,168 (96%)	$2,778,573
Total		62,020 / 64,155 (97%)	$4,145,155

=== Attendance ===
City	Country	Attendance		
Mérida	Mexico	22,500		
Tijuana	Mexico	15,000		
Mexico City	Mexico	40,000		
Tampico	Mexico	5,000		
Guayaquil	Ecuador	7,000		
Asuncion (Note: Club Olimipia Attendance 2009)	Paraguay	25,000		
Tucuman	Argentina	12,000		
Salta	Argentina	10,000		
Buenos Aires (Note: Attendance at Estadio Diego Armando Maradona in 2010)	Argentina	20,000		
Mendoza	Argentina	10,000		
Santiago	Chile	10,000		
Pereira	Colombia	16,000		
Medellin	Colombia	12,000		
Puerto Cabello (Note: Total attendance of 2th Annual International Carvanal of Puerto Cabello)	Venezuela	60,000		
Santo Domingo (Note: Attendance of August 29th of Festival Presidente de la Musica Latina 2010)	Dominican Republic	50,000		
San Juan	Puerto Rico	50,000	Total	364,500

== Cancelled concerts ==
List of cancelled concerts, showing date, city, country, venue, and reason for cancellation
Date	City	Country	Venue	Reason
July 27, 2009	Nuevo Laredo	Mexico	Plaza de Toros	Logistical conflict
December 12, 2009	Pachuca	Mexico	Polideportivo de la Universidad Autónoma del Estado de Hidalgo	Unknown
February 26, 2010	Puerto La Cruz	Venezuela	Estadio José Antonio Anzoátegui	Unknown
February 27, 2010	Maturin	Venezuela	Estadio Monumental de Maturín	Unknown
February 28, 2010	Puerto Ordaz	Venezuela	Centro Italo	Unknown
March 5, 2010	Mérida	Venezuela	Estadio Metropolitano de Mérida	Unknown
March 6, 2010	San Cristóbal	Venezuela	Plaza Monumental de Toros de Pueblo Nuevo	Unknown
March 7, 2010	Maracaibo	Venezuela	Estacionamiento de VIP Sambil Maracaibo	Unknown
October 8, 2010	Coquimbo	Chile	Estadio Municipal Francisco Sánchez Rumoroso	Unknown
October 9, 2010	Santiago	Chile	Estadio Bicentenario de La Florida	Unknown
