= Pa'l Mundo Tour =

2006–2007 concert tour by Wisin & Yandel

- Tour by Wisin & Yandel
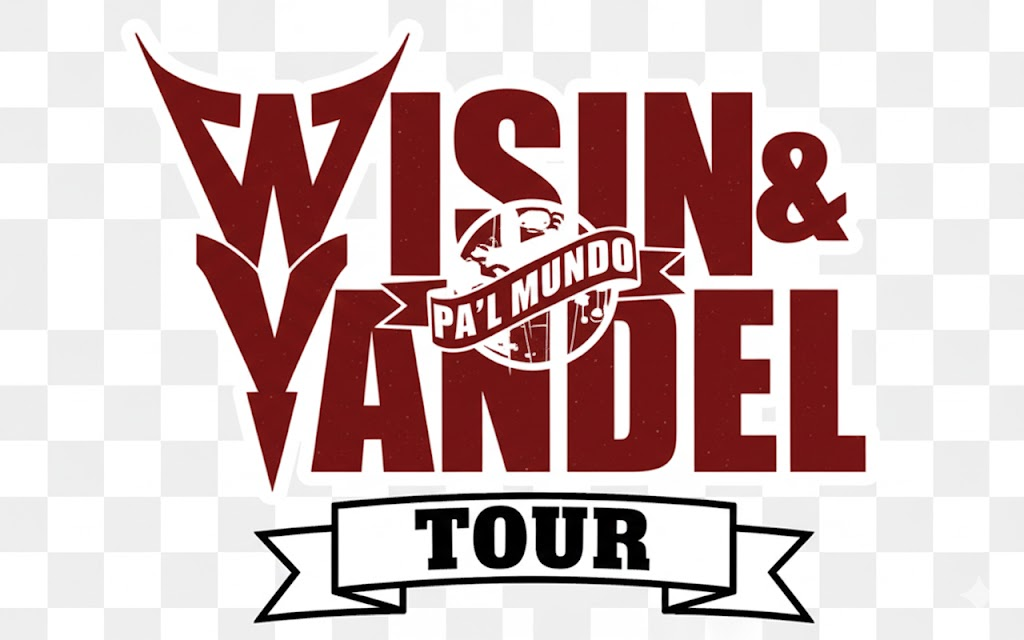
- Promotional poster for the tour
- Associated album: Pa'l Mundo
- Start date: January 30, 2006
- End date: February 2, 2007
- Legs: 2
- No. of shows: 34

Wisin & Yandel concert chronology
- Pa'l Mundo Tour (2006–07); Los Vaqueros Tour (2007)

The Pa'l Mundo Tour is the first world tour by the reggaeton duo Wisin & Yandel to promote their fifth studio album Pa'l Mundo. It consisted of two legs in Latin America and United States. This tour included their first presentation at the Coliseo de Puerto Rico and it marked the first time that a reggaeton act sold out two consecutive nights at the venue. Also, their presentation in Radio City Music Hall in New York and Altos de Chavon in Dominican Republic, marked the first time that a reggaeton act performed at those venues. Both concerts were reported sold out.

More shows were planned, however they were cancelled due to Wisin's illness in July 2006 and others for unknown reasons. Also, the tour marked their first presentation as a headliner artist in most of the cities in Latin America. The two concerts in Bolivia reported a total attendance of 55,000.

== Tour dates ==
Date	City	Country	Venue
Latin America, Europe and United States
January 30, 2006	San José	Costa Rica	Jacob Beach
February 3, 2006 (Note: this concert was part of Festival Kallpa 2006)	Lima	Peru	Club Cultural Lima de Villa
February 25, 2006	Orlando	United States	House Of Blues
March 17, 2006	San Juan	Puerto Rico	Coliseo José Miguel Agrelot
March 18, 2006	San Juan	Puerto Rico	Coliseo José Miguel Agrelot
April 7, 2006	Medellín	Colombia	Plaza de Toros La Maracena
April 14, 2006	Las Vegas	United States	TBA
April 21, 2006	Cancún	Mexico	Estadio de Béisbol Beto Ávila
April 29, 2006 (Note: this concert was part of Las Justas de Ponce)	Ponce	Puerto Rico	TBA
May 13, 2006 (Note: this concert was part of Invasion del Reggaeton)	Los Angeles	United States	Universal Amphitheatre
May 15, 2006 (Note: this concert was part of Digital FM 99.3 Festival)	Mexico City	Mexico	Zócalo
May 27, 2006	Santurce	Puerto Rico	Centro de Bellas Artes Luis A. Ferré
June 24, 2006	Amsterdam	Netherlands	The Power Zone
July 7, 2006	Cali	Colombia	Plaza de Toros
July 28, 2006	Puerto Ordaz	Venezuela	Centro Italo
July 30, 2006	Caracas	Venezuela	Poliedro de Caracas
August 1, 2006	Santiago	Chile	Arena Santiago
August 12, 2006	Guatemala City	Guatemala	Grand Tikal Futura Hotel
August 13, 2006	Guatemala City	Guatemala	Grand Tikal Futura Hotel
September 15, 2006 (Note: This concert was co-headlined by Aventura)	Managua	Nicaragua	Estadio Dennis Martinez
September 23, 2006 (Note: This performance was part of La Kalle 105.9 Block Party Concert)	New York	United States	Madison Square Garden
October 20, 2006	Medellín	Colombia	Plaza de Toros La Macarena
October 21, 2006	Cali	Colombia	Plaza de Toros Cañaveralejo
November 3, 2006	Springfield	United States	The Hipoddrome
November 17, 2006	Quito	Ecuador	Coliseo General Rumiñahui
November 18, 2006	Guayaquil	Ecuador	Coliseo Voltaire Paladines Polo
November 19, 2006	Cuenca	Ecuador	Plaza de Toros Santa Ana
November 25, 2006	Oranjestad	Aruba	Don Elias Mansur Ballpark
November 26, 2006	Valencia	Venezuela	Forum de Valencia
United States and Latin America
January 5, 2007 (Note: this concert was part of Showcase Medalla)	San Juan	Puerto Rico	Puerto Rico Convention Center
January 6, 2007 (Note: this concert was part of Party of Torres de Sabanas)	Carolina	Puerto Rico	Residencial Torres de Sabanas
January 17, 2007	La Paz	Bolivia	Estadio Hernando Siles
January 19, 2007	Santa Cruz	Bolivia	Estadio Ramón Tahuichi Aguilera
January 27, 2007	La Romana	Dominican Republic	Altos de Chavón
February 2, 2007	New York	United States	Radio City Music Hall

== Cancelled Concerts ==
List of cancelled concerts, showing date, city, country, venue, and reason for cancellation
Date	City	Country	Venue	Reason
July 15, 2006	San Salvador	El Salvador	Gimnasio Nacional Adolfo Pineda	Illness
July 21, 2006	Panama City	Panama	Centro de Convenciones Vasco Núñez de Balboa	Illness
