= Los Vaqueros Wild Wild Mixes =

Los Vaqueros: Wild Wild Mixes

Remix album by Wisin & Yandel and Various Artists
- Released: July 24, 2007
- Recorded: 2007
- Genre: Reggaeton
- Labels: WY Records, Machete
- Producers: Nesty "La Mente Maestra", Victor "El Nasi", Lalo, Monserrate & DJ Urba, Naldo, Tainy, Nely "El Arma Secreta"

Wisin & Yandel and Various Artists chronology
Los Vaqueros (2006)	Los Vaqueros: Wild Wild Mixes (2007)	Tomando Control: Live (2007)

Professional ratings
Review scores
Source	Rating
Allmusic	4/5 stars

Los Vaqueros: Wild Wild Mixes is a remix album by Wisin & Yandel, accompanied by the WY Records staff, released on July 24, 2007. It is a remix edition of the compilation album Los Vaqueros.

== Album details ==
The CD and DVD includes 21 songs, and two new versions of "Yo Te Quiero" by Wisin & Yandel, one with Jayko. There are a few special guests on this album like Don Omar, Yomo, Elephant Man, Luis Fonsi, Ken-Y & Hector "El Father". El Tío, who was on the first Los Vaqueros album, does not appear on this one, as he had left WY Records.

== Track listing ==
Standard Edition
No.	Title	Performer(s)	Length
1.	"Intro"	Wisin & Yandel featuring Don Omar	1:01
2.	"La Pared"	Wisin & Yandel featuring Don Omar & Gadiel	4:09
3.	"Bien Sudao"	Tony Dize	2:47
4.	"Perdido"	Jayko featuring Yandel	4:19
5.	"Un Viaje" (Remix)	Gadiel featuring Wisin & Yandel	3:12
6.	"Encaje"	Franco "El Gorila"	2:39
7.	"Nadie Como Tú"	Wisin & Yandel featuring Don Omar	3:43
8.	"Acomódate"	Tony Dize	2:46
9.	"Pegao" (Remix)	Wisin & Yandel featuring Elephant Man	3:53
10.	"Dame Un Kiss" (Remix)	Franco "El Gorila" featuring Yomo	3:05
11.	"Persona A Persona"	Jayko	4:54
12.	"Fue W."	Wisin	3:29
13.	"Envuélvete"	Tony Dize	3:16
14.	"Yo Te Quiero" (Remix)	Wisin & Yandel featuring Luis Fonsi	3:35
15.	"Eléctrica"	Wisin & Yandel featuring Gadiel	3:28
16.	"Atrévete"	Wisin & Yandel featuring Franco "El Gorila"	3:55
17.	"Quizás" (Remix)	Tony Dize featuring Ken-Y	4:00
18.	"El Teléfono"	Hector "El Father" featuring Wisin & Yandel	3:56
19.	"Pegao"	Wisin & Yandel	3:53
20.	"Yo Te Quiero" (R&B)	Wisin & Jayko	3:20
21.	"Yo Te Quiero"	Wisin & Yandel	3:28
Total length:			1:12:00

DVD (Music Videos)
No.	Title	Performer(s)	Length
1.	"Yo Te Quiero"	Wisin & Yandel	3:02
2.	"Quizás"	Tony Dize	3:06
3.	"Dame Un Kiss"	Franco "El Gorila"	3:18
4.	"Pegao"	Wisin & Yandel	3:48

== Notes ==
- Jayko's lyrics from his song "Perdido" were used in a remix of Nelly Furtado's "Say It Right."

== Chart performance ==
Chart (2007)	Peak position
U.S. Billboard 200	104
U.S. Billboard Top Latin Albums	4
U.S. Billboard Latin Rhythm Albums	2
