= Pa'l Mundo =

Studio album by Wisin & Yandel
- Released: November 8, 2005
- Recorded: 2004–2005
- Genre: Reggaeton
- Labels: WY; Machete
- Producers: Luny Tunes; Nely "El Arma Secreta"; Tainy; DJ Casper; Nales; Nesty "La Mente Maestra"; Naldo

Wisin & Yandel chronology
Mi Vida: La Película (2005)	Pa'l Mundo (2005)	Los Vaqueros (2006)

Singles from Pa'l Mundo
- 1. "Rakata" Released: January 27, 2005; 2. "Mírala Bien" Released: 2005; 3. "Llamé Pa' Verte (Bailando Sexy)" Released: 2005; 4. "Noche de sexo" Released: 2006

Pa'l Mundo: Deluxe Edition
- Pa'l Mundo: Deluxe Edition re-edition cover

Singles from Pa'l Mundo: Deluxe Edition
- 1. "Pam Pam" Released: May 2006; 2. "Toma" Released: 2006

Pa'l Mundo: First Class Delivery
- Pa'l Mundo: First Class Delivery edition cover

Professional ratings
Review scores
Source	Rating
AllMusic	5/5 stars

Pa'l Mundo (English: For the World) is the fourth studio album by Puerto Rican reggaeton duo Wisin & Yandel, released on November 8, 2005, by Machete Music.

The album includes the singles, "Rakata," "Llamé Pa' Verte (Bailando Sexy)," and "Noche de Sexo", each of which were top five hits on the U.S. Billboard Hot Latin Tracks chart. The song "Mayor Que Yo, Pt. 2" is a continuation of the song "Mayor Que Yo" from the album reggaeton compilation album Mas Flow 2 produced by Luny Tunes. Luny Tunes co-produced the bulk of Pa'l Mundo, assisted by Nely, Tainy, Thilo, and Nesty. A deluxe edition of the album was released on May 16, 2006. The "Deluxe Edition" was nominated for a Lo Nuestro Award for Urban Album of the Year.

== Commercial reception ==
Pa'l Mundo debuted number thirty on Billboard 200 and number one on Top Latin Albums The Duo become the second only reggaeton act at the time to debut at number one of Billboard Latin Albums selling 30,000 units in it first week. It sold 676,000 units in the US, as of 2017 and more than 1 million copies worldwide, according to their label as of 2007.

It was the 3rd Best Selling Latin Album in The United States of 2006. Pal Mundo reached the Top 10 in Venezuela, Chile and Dominican Republic's retail charts. The album was #7 in Billboard Top Latin Albums of the decade 2000s.

== Track listing ==
Standard Edition
No.	Title	Producer(s)	Length
1.	"Dale - Intro" (featuring Mr. Phillips)	Tainy	3:10
2.	"Manigueta"	Nely	2:47
3.	"Llamé Pa' Verte (Bailando Sexy)"	Luny Tunes, Nely	3:14
4.	"Paleta" (featuring Daddy Yankee)	Luny Tunes, Tainy, Thilo	2:55
5.	"Sólo Una Noche"	Nely	3:01
6.	"Mayor Que Yo, Pt. 2"	Luny Tunes, Thilo, Nales	3:47
7.	"La Barria" (featuring Héctor el Father)	Luny Tunes, Tainy	2:55
8.	"Calle Callejero"	Tainy, Nely	2:56
9.	"Sin El"	Luny Tunes, Nely	2:52
10.	"Rakata"	Luny Tunes, Nely	2:52
11.	"Sensación" (featuring Tony Dize)	Tainy	2:34
12.	"Tabla"	Tainy, Luny Tunes	2:54
13.	"Noche De Sexo" (featuring Aventura)	Nely	3:25
14.	"Mírala Bien"	Luny Tunes, Thilo	2:36
15.	"La Compañía" (featuring Franco "El Gorila" & Gadiel)	Nesty	3:23
16.	"Lento"	Luny Tunes	2:56
17.	"Títere"	Luny Tunes, Nesty	2:38
18.	"Yo Quiero"	Luny Tunes	2:44
19.	"Fuera de Base"	Luny Tunes, Nesty	3:06

Bonus Tracks
No.	Title	Producer(s)	Length
20.	"Rakata" (Remix) (featuring Ja Rule)	Luny Tunes & Nely	3:31
21.	"Rakata" (Hip hop Remix) (featuring Tea Time)	DaRock	3:23
22.	"Llamé Pa' Verte (Bailando Sexy)" (Instrumental)	Luny Tunes and Nely	3:20

Digital Bonus Tracks
No.	Title	Length
23.	"Mi Nombre Corre"	3:01

The Deluxe Edition

- Track #1-19 from standard edition, and includes a second disc and DVD.

Disc 2
No.	Title	Producer(s)	Length
1.	"Pam Pam"	Luny Tunes, Tainy & Naldo	3:47
2.	"Te Noto Tensa" (Wisin featuring Tony Dize)	Monserrate & DJ Urba	2:36
3.	"Toma" (Wisin featuring Franco "El Gorila")	Monserrate & DJ Urba	3:01
4.	"La Quebranta Hueso" (featuring El Tío)	DJ Eric	3:23
5.	"Mayor Que Yo, Pt. 2" (Remix) (featuring Tony Dize & Franco "El Gorila")	Luny Tunes	4:01
6.	"Burn It Up" (with R. Kelly)	Luny Tunes & Nely	3:52
7.	"Sácala" (featuring Héctor el Father & Don Omar)	Naldo	3:22
8.	"Llora Mi Corazón" (featuring La Secta AllStar)		3:07

DVD
No.	Title	Length
1.	"Llamé Pa' Verte (Bailando Sexy)" (Music Video)	3:23
2.	"Mírala Bien" (Music Video)	2:40
3.	"Making Of Mírala Bien"	9:36
4.	"Rakata" (Music Video)	2:58
5.	"Burn It Up" (with R. Kelly) (Music Video)	3:54
6.	"Exclusive Interview"

=== Pa'l Mundo: First Class Delivery ===
Pa'l Mundo: First Class Delivery is the second re-edition of the album, released on July 10, 2007, available only in Spain. The second re-edition contains 7 tracks from Pa'l Mundo, as well as some tracks from Los Vaqueros and other past hits. This album is distributed by Machete Music and El Cartel Records by Daddy Yankee.

First Class Delivery
No.	Title	Producer(s)	Length
1.	"Rakata"	Luny Tunes & Nely	2:52
2.	"Pam Pam"	Luny Tunes, Tainy & Naldo	3:47
3.	"Mayor Que Yo" (with Daddy Yankee, Tony Tun-Tun, Baby Ranks & Héctor el Father)	Luny Tunes	4:08
4.	"Pegao"	Nesty "La Mente Maestra" & Victor "El Nasi"	3:52
5.	"Llamé Pa' Verte (Bailando Sexy)"	Luny Tunes & Nely	3:14
6.	"No Me Dejes Solo" (with Daddy Yankee)	Fido, Monserrate & DJ Urba	2:50
7.	"El Teléfono" (featuring Héctor el Father)	Tainy	3:55
8.	"Noche De Sexo" (featuring Aventura)	Nely & Nesty	3:25
9.	"Yo Te Quiero"	Victor & Nesty	3:27
10.	"Sácala" (featuring Héctor el Father, Daddy Yankee, Naldo & Don Omar)	Naldo	3:59
11.	"Mírala Bien"	Thilo	2:36
12.	"Paleta" (featuring Daddy Yankee)	Luny Tunes & Tainy	2:55
13.	"Burn It Up" (with R. Kelly)	Luny Tunes & Nely	3:52
14.	"Dem Bow"	Luny Tunes & DJ Blass	2:04
15.	"Solo Una Noche"	Naldo & Nely	3:01
16.	"Noche de Entierro (Nuestro Amor)" (with Daddy Yankee, Héctor el Father, Tony Tun-Tun, & Zion)	Luny Tunes, Nales & Mr. G	4:23
17.	"Torre de Babel" (with David Bisbal)	Kike Santander	4:16

== Personnel ==
- Juan Luis Morera – Primary artist, vocals and lyrics
- Llandel Veguilla – Primary artist, vocals and lyrics
- Francisco Saldaña – Audio production, lyrics and executive producer
- Gustavo Lopez – Executive producer
- Victor Cabrera – Audio production and lyrics
- Josias de la Cruz – Audio production and lyrics
- Marco Masis – Audio production and lyrics
- Arnaldo Santos – Audio production and guitar
- Ramón Ayala – Featured artist, vocals and lyrics
- Héctor Delgado – Featured artist, vocals and lyrics
- Antonio Rivera – Featured artist, vocals and lyrics
- Anthony Santos – Featured artist, vocals and lyrics
- Luis Cortes – Featured artist, vocals and lyrics
- Gadiel Veguilla – Featured artist, vocals and lyrics
- Rafael De León – Creative director and graphic design
- Antonio Hernandez – Artists and repertoire
- Louis Martinez – Photography

== Charts ==
=== Weekly charts ===
Chart (2005–07)	Peak position
Chilean Albums (FeriaDelDisco)	6
Dominican Albums (Musicalia)	3
US Billboard 200	30
US Top Latin Albums (Billboard)	1
US Top Rap Albums (Billboard)	15
Venezuelan Albums (Recordland)	4

=== Year-end charts ===
Chart (2006)	Position
US Billboard 200	192
US Top Latin Albums (Billboard)	2
Chart (2007)	Position
US Top Latin Albums (Billboard)	16

== Certifications and sales ==
Region	Certification	Certified units/sales
Chile	Gold	
Ecuador	—	6,000
United States (RIAA)	Gold	676,000
Venezuela	Gold	5,000

== Release history ==
Region	Standard Edition	Deluxe Edition	First Class Delivery
United States	November 8, 2005	May 16, 2006	
Spain			July 7, 2007

== Accolades ==
Year	Nominee / work	Award	Result	Ref.
2006	Pal Mundo	Latin Billboard Music Awards – Reggaeton Album of the Year	Nominated	
2006	«Rakata»	Latin Billboard Music Awards – Hot Latin Song of the Year	Nominated	
2006	«Rakata»	Latin Billboard Music Awards – Song of the Year	Nominated	
2006	Pa'l Mundo	Latin Grammy Awards – Best Urban Music Album	Nominated	
2006	«Rakata»	Lo Nuestro Awards – Urban Song of the Year	Nominated	
2007	«Noche De Sexo»	Latin Billboard Music Awards – Vocal Duet or Collaboration	Nominated	
2007	«Pam Pam»	Latin Billboard Music Awards – Song of the Year	Nominated	
2007	«Rakata»	Latin Billboard Music Awards – Latin Ringtone of the Year	Won	
2007	Pa'l Mundo: Deluxe Edition	Lo Nuestro Awards – Urban Album of the Year	Nominated	
2007	«Llamé Pa' Verte»	Lo Nuestro Awards – Urban Song of the Year	Won	

== See also ==
- 2005 in Latin music
- List of best-selling Latin albums
- List of best-selling Latin albums in the United States
- List of number-one Billboard Latin Rhythm Albums of 2005
