= Irresistible (Wisin & Yandel song) =

2010 song by Wisin & Yandel

Single by Wisin & Yandel

from the album Step Up 3D & La Revolución: Live, Vol. 2
- Released: July 27, 2010
- Length: 3:07
- Label: Atlantic, Machete
- Songwriters: Juan Luis Morena, Llandel Veguilla, Marcos Masís
- Producers: Marioso, Victor "El Nasi", Tainy

Wisin & Yandel singles chronology
"Loco (Remix)" (2010)	"Irresistible" (2010)	"Estoy Enamorado" (2010)

"Irresistible" is a song performed by reggaeton duo Wisin & Yandel. The song is taken from Step Up 3D's soundtrack album. It was released for digital download on July 27, 2010. The song was also included on their live album La Revolución: Live, Vol. 2 and the deluxe edition from their 2011 collaborative album Los Vaqueros: El Regreso.

== Live performances ==
The song was premiered and performed first time on the 2010 Premios Juventud on July 15, after, Wisin & Yandel performed the remix version of "Loco" alongside duó Jowell & Randy, featured dancers from movie Step Up 3D dancing behind them.

== Critical reception ==
Sara D Anderson from Aol Radio Blog said that the song is a "Fusing auto-tune and anthemic back beats with rap and reggae-driven verses".

== Music video ==
Wisin & Yandel in the music video for "Irresistible".

=== Development ===
A music video was filmed in June 2010 in Los Angeles, it was directed by Music video director Jessy Terrero who has directed most of Wisin & Yandel's videos.

=== Synopsis ===
The music video starts when Wisin & Yandel are singing on the top of a building, while dancers are dancing inside showing their best dance moves, the video takes place in relation to the film, so the dancers it will appear in the film, are featured on the video.

The music video was premiered on July 15, 2010, through music video channels.

== Charts ==
The song debuted at number 36 on the Billboard Latin Pop Songs and number 45 on the Latin Songs.

Chart (2010)	Peak position
US Hot Latin Songs (Billboard)	29
US Latin Pop Airplay (Billboard)	20
US Tropical Songs (Billboard)	33
