= List of Billboard Latin Rhythm Albums number ones of 2007 =

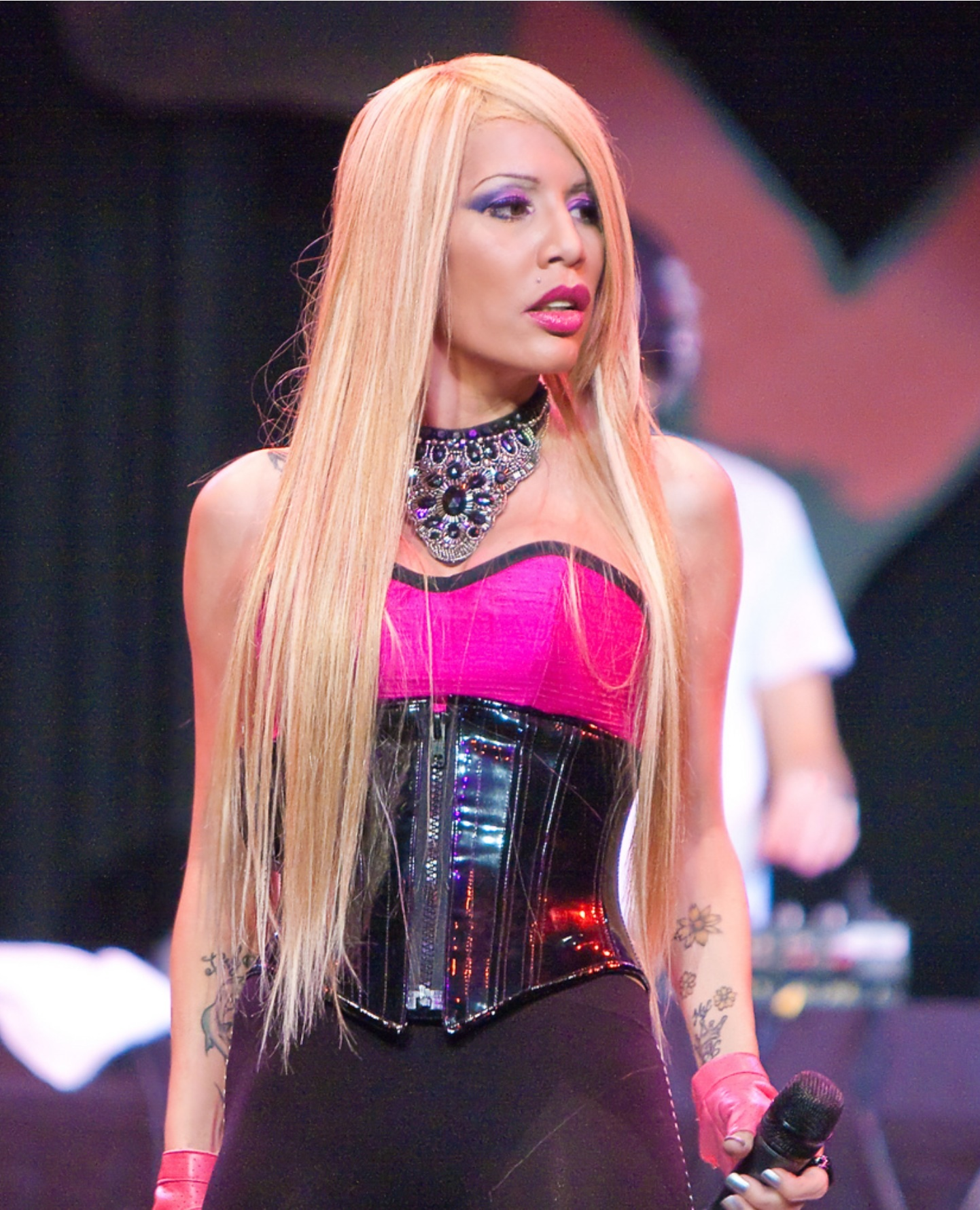
In 2007, Ivy Queen peaked at number one for the first time on this chart.

The Latin Rhythm Albums chart is a music chart published in Billboard magazine. This data is compiled by Nielsen SoundScan from a sample that includes music stores, music departments at electronics and department stores, internet sales (both physical and digital) and verifiable sales from concert venues in the United States to determine the top-selling Latin rhythm albums in the United States each week. The chart is composed of studio, live, and compilation releases by Latin artists performing in the Latin hip hop, urban, dance and reggaeton, the most popular Latin rhythm music genres.

There were twelve number-one albums in 2007. Puerto Rican performer Ivy Queen's sixth studio album Sentimiento sold nine thousand copies in its first week, becoming Queen's first album to "invade" the Billboard 200 chart, debuting at number 105. It also debuted atop the Billboard Latin Rhythm Albums chart, giving Queen her first number-one album, leading the chart for three weeks in April. Queen became the first female artist to post a number one on the chart. Puerto Rican band Calle 13's Residente o Visitante debuted on the Billboard 200 at number fifty-two, selling about 12,000 copies in its first week. The album remained on the Billboard 200 for a total of four weeks. It led the Billboard Latin Rhythm Airplay chart for two weeks in May. Puerto Rican singer Daddy Yankee's El Cartel: The Big Boss led the chart for fourteen weeks in 2007. The album debuted at number nine on the Billboard 200 and at number one on the Billboard Latin Albums chart, selling 82,000 copies in its first week.

== Albums ==
Chart date	Album	Artist(s)	Reference
January 6	WY Records Presents: Los Vaqueros	Various Artists	
January 13	King of Kings	Don Omar	
January 20	King of Kings	Don Omar	
January 27	King of Kings	Don Omar	
February 3	King of Kings	Don Omar	
February 10	King of Kings	Don Omar	
February 17	King of Kings	Don Omar	
February 27	King of Kings	Don Omar	
March 3	King of Kings	Don Omar	
March 10	King of Kings	Don Omar	
March 17	King of Kings	Don Omar	
March 24	King of Kings	Don Omar	
March 31	King of Kings	Don Omar	
April 7	King of Kings	Don Omar	
April 14	Sentimiento	Ivy Queen	
April 21	Sentimiento	Ivy Queen	
April 28	Sentimiento	Ivy Queen	
May 5	Masterpiece: Commemorative Edition	R.K.M & Ken-Y	
May 12	Residente o Visitante	Calle 13	
May 19	Residente o Visitante	Calle 13	
May 26	Masterpiece: Commemorative Edition	R.K.M & Ken-Y	
June 2	Mas Flow: Los Benjamins	Luny Tunes & Tainy	
June 9	Mas Flow: Los Benjamins	Luny Tunes & Tainy	
June 16	Mas Flow: Los Benjamins	Luny Tunes & Tainy	
June 23	El Cartel: The Big Boss	Daddy Yankee	
June 30	El Cartel: The Big Boss	Daddy Yankee	
July 3	El Cartel: The Big Boss	Daddy Yankee	
July 14	El Cartel: The Big Boss	Daddy Yankee	
July 21	El Cartel: The Big Boss	Daddy Yankee	
July 28	El Cartel: The Big Boss	Daddy Yankee	
August 4	El Cartel: The Big Boss	Daddy Yankee	
August 11	El Cartel: The Big Boss	Daddy Yankee	
August 18	El Cartel: The Big Boss	Daddy Yankee	
August 25	El Cartel: The Big Boss	Daddy Yankee	
September 1	El Cartel: The Big Boss	Daddy Yankee	
September 8	El Cartel: The Big Boss	Daddy Yankee	
September 15	El Abayarde Contraataca	Tego Calderón	
September 22	El Abayarde Contraataca	Tego Calderón	
September 29	El Cartel: The Big Boss	Daddy Yankee	
October 6	El Cartel: The Big Boss	Daddy Yankee	
October 13	Tomando Control: Live	Wisin & Yandel	
October 20	It's My Time	Tito "El Bambino"	
October 27	It's My Time	Tito "El Bambino"	
November 3	It's My Time	Tito "El Bambino"	
November 10	King of Kings: Live	Don Omar	
November 17	King of Kings: Live	Don Omar	
November 24	Wisin vs. Yandel: Los Extraterrestres	Wisin & Yandel	
December 1	Wisin vs. Yandel: Los Extraterrestres	Wisin & Yandel	
December 8	Wisin vs. Yandel: Los Extraterrestres	Wisin & Yandel	
December 15	Wisin vs. Yandel: Los Extraterrestres	Wisin & Yandel	
December 22	Wisin vs. Yandel: Los Extraterrestres	Wisin & Yandel	
December 29	Wisin vs. Yandel: Los Extraterrestres	Wisin & Yandel	
