= La Melodía de la Calle =

2008 studio album by Tony Dize

Studio album by Tony Dize
- Released: April 22, 2008
- Recorded: 2007
- Genre: Reggaeton
- Language: Spanish
- Label: WY; Machete
- Producer: Wisin & Yandel (exec.); Nesty la Mente Maestra; Víctor el Nasi; Tainy; Marioso; El Profesor Gómez; Richy Peña

Tony Dize chronology
| La Melodía de la Calle (2008) | La Melodía de la Calle: Updated (2009) |

Singles from La Melodía de la Calle
- 1. "Permítame" Released: 2008; 2. "Entre los Dos" Released: 2008; 3. "Vamos a Hacerlo" Released: 2008

Professional ratings
Review scores
| Source | Rating |
|---|---|
| AllMusic | 3.5/5 stars |

La Melodía de la Calle (transl. The Melody of the Street) is Tony Dize's debut studio album, released on April 22, 2008 on WY Records and Machete Music. It was nominated for a Lo Nuestro Award for Urban Album of the Year.

== Track listing ==
| # | Title | Guest(s) | Producer(s) | Length |
|---|---|---|---|---|
| 1 | "Mi Vida (Intro)" | | Víctor, Nesty & Gómez | 3:17 |
| 2 | "Avísame" | | Víctor, Nesty & Marioso | 3:04 |
| 3 | "Descontrol" | Wisin & Yandel | Víctor, Nesty & Marioso | 3:39 |
| 4 | "Amor Bailando" | | Víctor, Nesty & Marioso | 3:08 |
| 5 | "Vamos a Hacerlo" | Jayko el Prototipo | Víctor, Nesty, Puka & Marioso | 4:12 |
| 6 | "Sufriendo" | | Víctor & Nesty, Gómez | 3:26 |
| 7 | "Permítame" | Yandel | Tainy, Víctor & Marioso | 3:05 |
| 8 | "Entre los Dos" | | DNA & Marioso | 2:28 |
| 9 | "Hálala" | Franco el Gorila, Gadiel | Víctor & Nesty | 3:05 |
| 10 | "Decirme No a Mí" | | Richy Peña | 3:01 |
| 11 | "Bien Sudao'" | | Víctor, Nesty & Marioso | 2:48 |
| 12 | "Pa' Darle" | Wisin | Víctor, Nesty & Marioso | 3:19 |
| 13 | "Que Te Tiene Así" | | Víctor, Nesty & Marioso | 3:22 |
| 14 | "Líbrame Señor" | | Gómez | 3:58 |
| 15 | "Una Mirada Bastó" | | Richy Peña | 3:00 |
| 16 | "Quizás (Versión Salsa)" | | Ángelo Torres | 4:12 |
| 17 | "Quizás" (Music Video) | | WY Records | 3:06 |

== Chart performance ==
| Chart (2008) | Peak position | Sales |
|---|---|---|
| US Billboard 200 | 195 | 50.000 |
| US Top Latin Albums | 8 | |
