= Gran Arena del Cibao =

Arena in the Dominican Republic

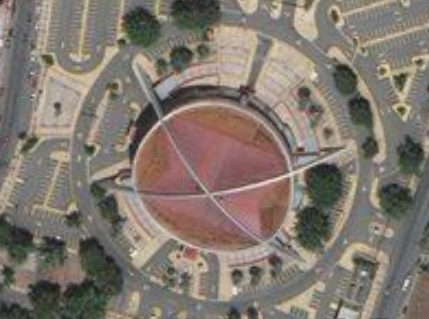
- Interactive map of Gran Arena del Cibao
- Full name: Arena del Cibao Dr. Oscar Gobaira
- Former names: Palacio de los Deportes
- Address: Av. Enriquillo 35; Santiago de los Caballeros; Dominican Republic
- Location: Avenida Enriquillo 35, Santiago de los Caballeros, Dominican Republic
- Coordinates: 19.4654°N 70.7096°W
- Capacity: 8,768 (Sports); 6,670 (Concerts)

Construction
- Opened: 1979
- Renovated: 2008
- Cost: RD$528 million (renovations)
- Architect: Rafael Calventi Gaviño

Tenant
- Metros de Santiago (LNB)

The Gran Arena del Cibao Dr. Oscar Gobaira, historically known as the Palacio de los Deportes de Santiago, is a multi-use indoor arena located in the center of Santiago de los Caballeros, Dominican Republic. Originally constructed in 1978 and extensively remodeled in 2008 for RD$528,000,000, the 8,768-seat stadium serves as the home court for the Metros de Santiago basketball team and stands as a major northern entertainment hub hosting iconic Latin and local Dominican artists.

In recent years, the arena has faced critical structural challenges stemming from severe roof deterioration. Gaps caused by old ventilation extractors and the theft of protective copper plates have led to major water leaks during heavy rains, repeatedly disrupting events and damaging surrounding areas. An official assessment by a committee of 20 government engineers has ruled out any immediate risk of a total structural collapse.

== Description ==
It is located in the center of Santiago de los Caballeros, where it was originally constructed in 1978 under Joaquín Balaguer as the Palacio de los Deportes de Santiago. Then, the facility underwent a massive RD$528,000,000 remodeling project in 2008, resulting in its modern renaming into Gran Arena del Cibao Dr. Oscar Gobaira. The arena has a capacity of 8,768 seats, consisting of 7,000 regular seats, 668 comfortable armchairs and 1,100 luxury seats that are fully reclinable. The capacity of concerts is between 7,000 and 6,670 seats. The arena is the home of Metros de Santiago, a national basketball team.

=== Deteriorating infrastructure ===
In 2023, reports surfaced that the Gran Arena’s roof was severely deteriorating, with the holes originally designed as hot-air extractors causing major leaks during heavy rains, spilling onto the court and delaying basketball games. After two years, the deterioration report was back, showing severe water leaks had reappeared. The reason is primarily the theft of copper plates designed to prevent water infiltration, as well as the opening originally intended for hot-air extraction. The arena's administration uses event revenue for minor fixes such as repairing bathrooms and painting hallways. In April 2024, Luis Abinader announced in La Semanal a multi-million-dollar intervention funded by Kelvin Cruz to repair the air conditioning system.

After that, a committee of 20 engineers from the Ministry of Sports conducted an official structural assessment. The evaluation determined that the visible damage is caused by corrosion and the detachment of protective outer metal sheets, ruling out any immediate risk of structural collapse.

== Concert venue ==
As a concert venue, Aventura was the first act to perform at the venue since it remodelation in 2008. It was the first massive concert in the city in the last 10 years. It has hosted concerts by Don Miguelo, Luis Vargas, Elvis Martinez and DJ Adoni.

== Notable events and concerts ==
Band/Artist	Event/tour	Date	Attendance
Aventura	K.O.B Tour	August 29 & 30, 2008	Sold Out
Daddy Yankee	The Big Boss Tour	December 20, 2008	
Wisin & Yandel	Los Extraterrestres World Tour	March 13 & 14, 2009	
Ricardo Arjona	5to Piso Tour	May 29, 2009	Sold Out
Julio Iglesias		October 27, 2009	
Ivy Queen, Arcangel, Jowell & Randy, Alexis & Fido, Omega, Toño Rosario & Vakera	Otoño Music Fest 2009	October 31, 2009	
Gilberto Santa Rosa & Sergio Vargas		December 19, 2009	
Raymond & Miguel		December 26, 2009	
Hector Acosta "El Torito"	El Torito Monumental	June 12, 2010	
Enanitos Verdes		October 1, 2010	4,000
David Bisbal	Sin Mirar Atras Tour	22 October 2010	
Kanqui	Tu Super Amigo	November 7, 2010	
Don Omar		November 27, 2010	Sold Out
Tito el Bambio & Zion & Lennox		December 4, 2010	
Servando & Florentino, Bacilos, Jerry Rivera & Vakero	Tropical Sound Concert	January 11, 2011	
Silvio Rodriguez		March 19, 2011	
Prince Royce		April 9, 2011	Sold Out
Daddy Yankee	Mundial Tour	May 21, 2011	
Calle 13	Entre los que quieran Tour	October 2, 2011	
Jesús Adrián Romero y Marcela Gándara		December 14, 2011	
Hector Acosta "El Torito"	El Torito Pal Pueblo	September 29, 2012	
Arcángel, R.K.M & Ken-Y, Zion & Lennox y Plan B	Hallow Maniac 2012: La Formula de Pina Records	October 27, 2012	
Tercer Cielo		December 22, 2013	
Jesús Adrián Romero	Soplando Vida Tour	December 20, 2013	
Christine D’Clario, Felsy Jones and Barak	Juntos & en Armonia	March 22, 2014	
Hector Acosta "El Torito", Milly Quezada & Johnny Ventura	La Noche Del Pueblo	October 18, 2015	Sold Out
Holiday Urban Fest (Note: The line up was composed by Cosculluela, Alexis & Fido, De la Ghetto y Ken-Y, Don Miguelo, El Alfa, Messiah, Sensato, El Mayor Clásico and Mark B.)		December 23, 2015	
Miss Dominican Republic Pageant		August 26, 2018	
El Nene la Amenazzy		November 16, 2019	5,000+
Grabiel	Morisoñando Tour	November 29, 2019	
Don Miguelo	El Mejor del Bloque	August 27, 2022	Sold Out
A Pesar de Todo Fest		August 17, 2024	
Dj Adoni		September 21, 2024	Sold Out
Luis Vargas	40 Años de Trayectoria	Octubre 19, 2024	
El Alfa	El Alfa World Tour	December 14, 2024	Cancelled
Elvis Martinez	The GOAT of Bachata Tour 2025	July 17–18, 2025	Sold Out
Yailin La Mas Viral		August 30, 2025	7,000
Chicas del Can	Las Chicas del Can: El Reencuentro	November 15, 2025	
Shadow Blow	Capitulos	December 20, 2025	
Raulin Rodriguez		December 27, 2025	
El Prodigio	EL REENCUENTRO EL PRODIGIO & LA SUPER BANDA	September 18 & 19, 2026	
Rawayana	Donde es el After? Tour	October 2 & 3, 2026	
