= List of Billboard Latin Rhythm Airplay number ones of 2006 =

The Billboard Latin Rhythm Airplay is a chart that ranks the most-played songs on Latin rhythm radio stations. Published by Billboard magazine, the data are compiled by Nielsen SoundScan based collectively on each single's weekly airplay.

== Chart history ==
Key
†	Indicates number 1 on Billboard's year-end Latin rhythm chart

Issue date	Song	Artist(s)	Ref.
January 7	"Rakata"	Wisin & Yandel	
January 14	"Rakata"	Wisin & Yandel	
January 21	"Rompe" †	Daddy Yankee	
January 28	"Rompe" †	Daddy Yankee	
February 4	"Rompe" †	Daddy Yankee	
February 11	"Rompe" †	Daddy Yankee	
February 18	"Rompe" †	Daddy Yankee	
February 25	"Rompe" †	Daddy Yankee	
March 4	"Rompe" †	Daddy Yankee	
March 11	"Rompe" †	Daddy Yankee	
March 18	"Rompe" †	Daddy Yankee	
March 25	"Rompe" †	Daddy Yankee	
April 1	"Rakata"	Wisin & Yandel	
April 8	"Rakata"	Wisin & Yandel	
April 15	"Rakata"	Wisin & Yandel	
April 22	"Rakata"	Wisin & Yandel	
April 29	"Rakata"	Wisin & Yandel	
May 6	"Rakata"	Wisin & Yandel	
May 13	"Down"	R.K.M & Ken-Y	
May 20	"Down"	R.K.M & Ken-Y	
May 27	"Down"	R.K.M & Ken-Y	
June 3	"Down"	R.K.M & Ken-Y	
June 10	"Angelito"	Don Omar	
June 17	"Down"	R.K.M & Ken-Y	
June 24	"Down"	R.K.M & Ken-Y	
July 1	"Down"	R.K.M & Ken-Y	
July 8	"Down"	R.K.M & Ken-Y	
July 15	"Down"	R.K.M & Ken-Y	
July 22	"Down"	R.K.M & Ken-Y	
July 29	"Down"	R.K.M & Ken-Y	
August 5	"Down"	R.K.M & Ken-Y	
August 12	"Down"	R.K.M & Ken-Y	
August 19	"Down"	R.K.M & Ken-Y	
August 26	"Down"	R.K.M & Ken-Y	
September 2	"Down"	R.K.M & Ken-Y	
September 9	"Down"	R.K.M & Ken-Y	
September 16	"Pam Pam"	Wisin & Yandel	
September 23	"Tengo Un Amor"	Toby Love featuring R.K.M & Ken-Y	
September 30	"Pam Pam"	Wisin & Yandel	
October 7	"Pam Pam"	Wisin & Yandel	
October 14	"Tengo Un Amor"	Toby Love featuring R.K.M & Ken-Y	
October 21	"Pam Pam"	Wisin & Yandel	
October 28	"Pam Pam"	Wisin & Yandel	
November 4	"Pam Pam"	Wisin & Yandel	
November 11	"Pam Pam"	Wisin & Yandel	
November 18	"Tengo Un Amor"	Toby Love featuring R.K.M & Ken-Y	
November 25	"Dime"	Pitbull featuring Frankie J and Ken-Y	
December 2	"Dime"	Pitbull featuring Frankie J and Ken-Y	
December 9	"Dime"	Pitbull featuring Frankie J and Ken-Y	
December 16	"Dime"	Pitbull featuring Frankie J and Ken-Y	
December 23	"Dime"	Pitbull featuring Frankie J and Ken-Y	
December 30	"Dime"	Pitbull featuring Frankie J and Ken-Y	

== See also ==
- List of number-one Billboard Hot Latin Songs of 2006
