= Mi Vida: La Película =

Compilation album by Wisin & Yandel
- Released: March 22, 2005
- Genre: Reggaeton
- Length: 27:47
- Label: Fresh Productions
- Producer: DJ Blass; Luny Tunes

Wisin & Yandel chronology
El Sobreviviente (2004)	Mi Vida: La Película (2005)	Pa'l Mundo (2005)

Professional ratings
Review scores
Source	Rating
AllMusic	3/5 stars

Mi Vida: La Película (English: My Life: The Movie) is a compilation album by Wisin & Yandel. It also included a movie based on the early days of the duo's careers.

== Track listing ==
No.	Title	Length
1.	"Mi Vida...Mega Mix"	4:24
2.	"Guáyale El Mahón"	2:28
3.	"Esta Noche Hay Pelea"	2:50
4.	"Tú Sabes"	2:36
5.	"Dembow"	3:00
6.	"La Sata"	3:26
7.	"Quiero Verte Bailar"	2:37
8.	"Con Mi Reggae Muero"	3:37
9.	"Pégate"	2:49
Total length:		27:47

DVD (Movie)
No.	Title	Length
1.	"Mi Vida"	54:14
