= Los Vaqueros: El Regreso World Tour =

2011–12 concert tour by Wisin & Yandel

- Tour by Wisin & Yandel
- Associated album: Los Vaqueros: El Regreso
- Start date: January 27, 2011
- End date: April 27, 2012
- Legs: 3
- No. of shows: 36

Wisin & Yandel concert chronology
- La Revolución World Tour (2009–10); Los Vaqueros: El Regreso World Tour (2011–12); Los Lideres World Tour (2012–14)

The Los Vaqueros: El Regreso World Tour is the fifth world by the reggaeton duo Wisin & Yandel to support their seventh album studio Los Vaqueros: El Regreso. This tour included their first official arena tour in The United States and their first presentation as headliners in Mexico, Colombia and Venezuela.

== Overview ==
The tour contained their first arena tour in the United States. The concert in Los Angeles set a records in attendance by a Hispanic act at Nokia Theatre. In Mexico, they performed at the Plaza de Toros, becoming the fist act to do so.

== Tour dates ==
Date	City	Country	Venue
Latin America
January 27, 2011	Arecibo	Puerto Rico	Coliseo Manuel Iguina
January 28, 2011	Ponce	Puerto Rico	La Guancha
February 11, 2011	Guadalajara	Mexico	Auditorio Telmex
February 12, 2011	Mexico City	Mexico	Plaza de Toros México
February 19, 2011	Morelia	Mexico	Plaza Monumental de Morelia
February 20, 2011	Acapulco	Mexico	Forum de Mundo Imperial
March 26, 2011 (Note: This concert was co-headlined by Pitbull)	Panama City	Panama	Figali Convention Center
Europe
April 7, 2011 (Note: This concert was co-headlined by Manu TJ)	Barcelona	Spain	Forum Building
April 8, 2011	Milan	Italy	Palasharp Arena
April 9, 2011	Rome	Italy	Spazio Atlantico
April 10, 2011	Paris	France	Zénith de Paris
Latin America
May 20, 2011 (Note: This concert was co-headlined by Franco El Gorila, Alberto Stylee, Wolfine, De La Ghetto & Tego Calderon)	Medellín	Colombia	Lote Contiguo Ayura Motor
North American
June 3, 2011	Miami	United States	American Airlines Arena
June 4, 2011	Rosemont	United States	Rosemont Theatre
June 9, 2011	Los Angeles	United States	Nokia Theatre
June 10, 2011	Los Angeles	United States	Nokia Theatre
June 11, 2011	San Diego	United States	Valley View Casino Center
June 12, 2011	Paradise	United States	Mandalay Bay Resort
June 16, 2011	Houston	United States	Club Escapade
June 17, 2011	Grand Prairie	United States	Verizon Theatre
June 18, 2011	San Antonio	United States	AT&T Center
June 19, 2011	Laredo	United States	Laredo Energy Arena
June 24, 2011	Newark	United States	Prudential Center
June 25, 2011	Springfield	United States	MassMutual Center
Latin America
August 5, 2011	Managua	Nicaragua	Forum Mundo E
August 6, 2011	Guatemala City	Guatemala	Forum Mundo E
August 13, 2011 (Note: This concert was part of Pepsi Summer Stage 2011)	New York City	United States	Central Park
October 29, 2011 (Note: This concert was part of Tigo Music Fest)	Tegucigalpa	Honduras	Estadio Chochi Sosa
November 12, 2011	Acapulco	Mexico	
December 1, 2011 (Note: This concert was part of Festival Aragua 2011)	Maracay	Venezuela	Estadio Olímpico Hermanos Ghersi Páez
December 2, 2011	San Juan	Puerto Rico	Coliseo de Puerto Rico
December 3, 2011	San Juan	Puerto Rico	Coliseo de Puerto Rico
December 4, 2011	San Juan	Puerto Rico	Coliseo de Puerto Rico
January 24, 2012 (Note: This concert was part of Calibash 2012)	Los Angeles	United States	Staples Center
February 20, 2012 (Note: This concert was part of Carnavales de Internacionales del Veracruz)	Veracruz	Mexico	Gran Plaza del Malecón
March 17, 2012 (Note: This concert was part of Tigo Fest Music 2012)	Guatemala City	Guatemala	Estadio Cementos Progreso
April 27, 2012 (Note: This concert was part of Festival de la Leyenda Vallenata)	Valledupar	Colombia	Parque de la Leyenda Vallenata

=== Box office data ===
City	Country	Attendance	Box office
San Juan	Puerto Rico	37,689 / 39,357 (96%)	$2,398,560
Miami	United States	12,779 / 13,405 (95%)	$769,080
New York	United States	11,952 / 13,046 (92%)	$977,515
Total		62,420 / 65,808 (95%)	$4,145,155

== Cancelled concerts ==
List of cancelled concerts, showing date, city, country, venue, and reason for cancellation
Date	City	Country	Venue	Reason
May 5, 2011	Villahermosa	Mexico	Parque Tasbasco	Unknown
May 11, 2011	San Luis Potosí	Mexico	Centro de Convenciones de SLP	Unknown
May 13, 2011	Mérida	Mexico	Estadio Carlos Iturralde	Unknown
June 30, 2011	San Felipe	Venezuela	Estadio Florentino Oropeza	Unknown
July 29, 2011	León	Mexico	Poliedro De Leon	Unknown
July 30, 2011	Puebla	Mexico	Auditorio Siglo XXI	Unknown
July 31, 2011	Tuxtla Gutiérrez	Mexico	Estadio Víctor Manuel Reyna	Unknown
September 16, 2011	Cochabamba	Bolivia	Estadio Félix Capriles	Unknown
September 17, 2011	Santa Cruz de la Sierra	Bolivia	Estadio Ramón Tahuichi Aguilera	Unknown
September 21, 2011	San Miguel	El Salvador	Estadio Juan Francisco Barraza	Unknown
