= Estoy Enamorado (Wisin & Yandel song) =

Single by Wisin & Yandel

from the album La Revolución: Live
- Released: July 12, 2010
- Genre: Reggaeton
- Length: 4:31
- Label: Machete
- Songwriters: Juan Luis Morena, Llandel Veguilla, Jose Gomez, Victor Martinez, Ernesto F. Padilla
- Producers: Victor "El Nasi", Nesty, "El Profesor" Gómez

Wisin & Yandel singles chronology
"Irresistible" (2010)	"Estoy Enamorado" (2010)	"No Me Digas Que No" (2010)

"Estoy Enamorado" (English: I'm in Love) is the first single released by Reggaeton duo Wisin & Yandel from their live album La Revolución: Live. The song was released digitally on July 12, 2010. The song was also included on the deluxe edition from Los Vaqueros: El Regreso. The official remix features Mexican singer-songwriter Larry Hernandéz.

== Composition ==
"Estoy Enamorado" is a Reggaeton-R&B ballad featuring a melody led by guitar notes. It was written by the artists alongside Jose Gomez, Victor Martinez and Ernesto F. Padilla. It was produced by Victor "El Nasi", Nesty and "El Profesor" Gómez. The lyrics are mainly for a man falling in love, waiting to tell his girlfriend.

== Chart performance ==
On the week of September 25, 2010 the song debuted at number 48 on the Billboard Latin Songs. The next week, the song debuted at number 34 on the Billboard Latin Pop Songs. Although to the first weeks the release of the song failed to enter the top 20, recently the song entered into the top ten on all the Billboard Latin charts. It received and award for "Urban Song of the Year" at the 2012 ASCAP Awards, which are awarded annually by the American Society of Composers, Authors and Publishers in the United States.

== Music video ==
=== Development ===
A music video for the song was filmed in June 2010 in a desert near Los Angeles. It was directed by long-time Wisin & Yandel collaborator Jessy Terrero. It premiered on August 19, 2010. A music video featured additional vocals from Larry Hernandéz was also filmed.

Wisin & Yandel in the music video.

=== Synopsis ===
The lyrics that have to do with the expression of love toward his partner are combined in the video with shocking images of a couple being arrested by the Border Patrol while the husband's young granddaughter looks on stunned at her grandparents being arrested. One of the police officers in the video is portrayed by Jesse Garcia.

While they reiterate the phrase "Estoy Enamorado", there are scenes of a nighttime chase in the desert located on the border between Mexico and the United States. As a corollary some Latino people, presumably Mexicans, living in the U.S. literally fade from their daily lives. It concludes with a crowd protesting the persecution of immigrants, while lifting banners and shouting: "¡Si se Puede!" (Yes we can!)

In the end, the screen goes dark and in white lyrics it reads as follows:

"Creemos en la protección de los derechos de todo ser humano. La Ley SB1070 representa una violacion de esos derechos y una injusticia contra la integridad de nuestras comunidades. En nuestra unión esta la fuerza. Unámosnos. Recuerda en este mundo todos somos iguales!"
("We believe in protecting the rights of every human being. SB 1070 Law represents a violation of those rights and an injustice to the integrity of our communities. In our union there is strength. Unite. Remember, in this world, we are all equal!")

== Charts ==
=== Weekly charts ===
Chart (2010/11)	Peak position
US Hot Latin Songs (Billboard)	7
US Latin Pop Airplay (Billboard)	7
US Tropical Airplay (Billboard)	6
US Latin Rhythm Airplay (Billboard)	3
US Heatseekers Songs (Billboard)	22

=== Year-end charts ===
Chart (2011)	Position
US Hot Latin Songs (Billboard)	15
