= Los Vaqueros =

Studio album by Wisin & Yandel
- Released: November 7, 2006
- Recorded: 2006
- Genre: Reggaeton
- Labels: WY Records, Machete
- Producers: Nesty "La Mente Maestra" (Co-exec.), Victor "El Nasi" (Co-exec.), Urba & Monserrate, Tainy, Naldo

Wisin & Yandel chronology
Pa'l Mundo (2005)	Los Vaqueros (2006)	Los Vaqueros Wild Wild Mixes (2007)

Singles from Los Vaqueros
- 1. "Pegao" Released: October 24, 2006; 2. "Dame Un Kiss" Released: December 2006; 3. "Yo Te Quiero" Released: January 13, 2007; 4. "Quizás" Released: March 5, 2007

Professional ratings
Review scores
Source	Rating
AllMusic	4/5 stars

Los Vaqueros (English: The Cowboys) is a collaboration album by Wisin & Yandel featuring the artists from their record label WY Records. It was nominated for a Lo Nuestro Award for Urban Album of the Year.

== Content ==
It features the following artists: Wisin & Yandel, Gadiel, Franco "El Gorila", Yomille Omar "El Tio", Tony Dize with guest appearances by Don Omar, Gallego and Héctor el Father. This album is the "baby" of Wisin & Yandel's recently emerged WY Records, for being the first production by the record label. Besides participating in the vocals, Herson Cifuentes was as well active in the production and development of Los Vaqueros. The Puerto Rican duo, as founders of WY Records, introduced Franco "El Gorilla", Gadiel, and El Tío to the genre for the first time with a more broad promotion by featuring them in several songs on this album. Not too long after the release of Los Vaqueros, a Collector's Edition was released by the company, which included the original CD but with four extra songs plus an extra DVD with two music video clips, an interview, and a photo shot session video.

== Track listing ==
Standard Edition
No.	Title	Producer(s)	Length
1.	"Intro" (Wisin)	Victor & Nesty	0:43
2.	"Pegao" (Wisin & Yandel)	Victor & Nesty	3:52
3.	"Envuélvete" (Tony Dize)	Victor & Nesty	3:14
4.	"Eléctrica" (Wisin & Yandel featuring Gadiel)	Monserrate & DJ Urba	3:28
5.	"Dame Un Kiss" (Franco "El Gorila")	Victor & Nesty	3:05
6.	"Nadie Como Tú" (Wisin & Yandel featuring Don Omar)	Victor & Nesty	3:42
7.	"Mujerón" (El Tío)	Monserrate & DJ Urba	2:44
8.	"Quizás" (Tony Dize)		3:06
9.	"Soy De La Calle" (Wisin & Yandel, Franco "El Gorila", & Gallego)	Victor & Nesty	4:24
10.	"La Noche Está Pa' Jangueo" (Tony Dize & Franco "El Gorila")	Victor & Nesty	3:07
11.	"Yo Te Quiero" (Wisin & Yandel)	Victor & Nesty	3:27
12.	"Chu Chin" (El Tío featuring Yandel)	Monserrate & DJ Urba	3:35
13.	"Dale Más" (Tony Dize)	Victor & Nesty	2:59
14.	"Un Viaje" (Gadiel & Yandel)	Monserrate & DJ Urba	2:49
15.	"Tiembla" (Franco "El Gorila")	Victor & Nesty	3:00
16.	"Fue W." (Wisin)	Victor & Nesty	3:27
17.	"Round 3" (Franco "El Gorila)	Monserrate & DJ Urba	4:36
Total length:			55:10

Bonus Track
No.	Title	Producer(s)	Length
18.	"El Teléfono" (Héctor el Father featuring Wisin & Yandel)	Tainy	3:57
Total length:			59:25

Special / Collector's Edition - CD
No.	Title	Producer(s)	Length
18.	"Quiero Hacerte El Amor" (Wisin & Yandel featuring El Tío & Franco "El Gorila")	Monserrate & DJ Urba	4:07
19.	"Calienta & Pega" (El Tío)	Monserrate & DJ Urba	2:41
20.	"Échale Leña Al Fuego" (Tony Dize & Yandel)		2:55
21.	"Sal Del Callejón" (Franco "El Gorila")	Monserrate & DJ Urba	4:11
22.	"El Teléfono" (Héctor el Father featuring Wisin & Yandel)	Tainy	3:57
Total length:			1:13:19

Collector's Edition - DVD
No.	Title	Length
1.	"Pegao" (Music Video)	3:48
2.	"El Teléfono" (Music Video)	3:57
3.	"Making Of Photo Shoot "Los Vaqueros""
4.	"Interviews"
5.	"Wallpapers"

=== Wild Wild Mixes ===
Los Vaqueros: Wild Wild Mixes is a remix album of Los Vaqueros released on July 24, 2007.

== Charts ==
Chart (2006)	Peak position
U.S. Billboard 200	44
U.S. Billboard Top Latin Albums	2
U.S. Billboard Latin Rhythm Albums	1

== Certifications ==
Region	Certification	Certified units/sales
United States (RIAA)	2× Platinum (Latin)	200,000^{^}
^{^} Shipments figures based on certification alone.

== See also ==
- List of number-one Billboard Latin Rhythm Albums of 2007
