= Estadio de Monteria =

- Interactive map of Estadio de Monteria
- Full name: Estadio de Monteria
- Location: Montería, Colombia
- Coordinates: 8°42′42″N 75°49′40″W
- Capacity: 42,000
- Surface: Grass

Construction
- Groundbreaking: August 6, 2010
- Opened: Early 2012

Tenant
- 2012 Juegos Nacionales

Estadio de Monteria is a stadium in Montería, Colombia that is under construction. It will host the opening and closing ceremonies of the Juegos Nacionales (National Games of Columbia). It will have a seating capacity of 42,000 spectators.
