= Tony Dize =

American singer

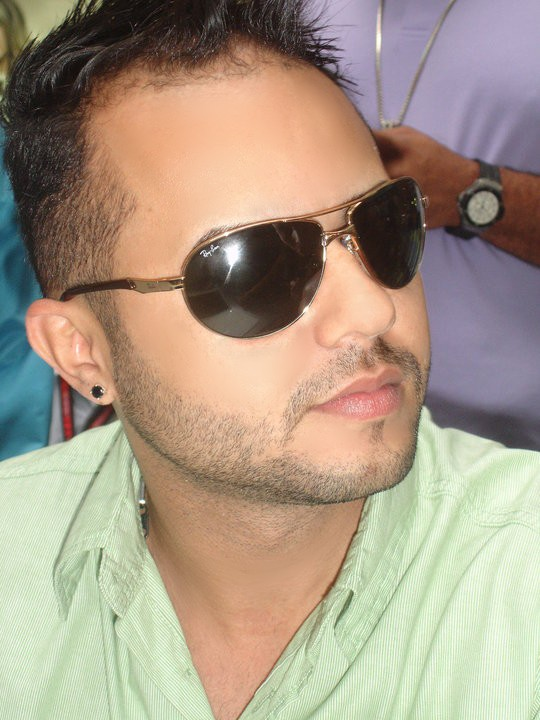
- Tony Dize in 2010

Background information
- Also known as: La Melodía de la Calle
- Born: Tony Feliciano Rivera; May 31, 1982 (age 44); Boston, Massachusetts, U.S.
- Genres: Reggaeton; tropical; Latin ballad
- Occupations: Singer; songwriter
- Years active: 2003–present
- Labels: WY; Machete; Pina; Sony Latin; Rimas

Tony Feliciano Rivera (born May 31, 1982), better known by stage name Tony Dize, is an American singer and songwriter. His first recorded performance was from the album Blin Blin, Vol. 1, with Wisin & Yandel in 2003, after which he collaborated with other artists of the genre and later released his debut album in 2008 titled La Melodía de la Calle under WY Records and Machete Music. He was signed to Pina Records and Sony Music Latin, for which he released La Melodía de la Calle: Updated in 2009.

== Musical career ==
Tony Dize cites Vico C, Tego Calderón, Tempo, and Ivy Queen, among others as sources of inspiration. He started on the compilation album Blin Blin, Vol. 1 (2003), with the song "No Pierdas Tiempo".

He has worked with DJs such as Luny Tunes, Naldo, Urba & Monserrate, Notty, and Noriega. He appeared as a guest in the album Pa'l Mundo, in a song with Wisin & Yandel called "Sensación". The song was a minor hit.

Dize broke through with the song "Quizás", on the album Los Vaqueros. The official remix of the song features Ken-Y. He was signed to WY Records and his first production, La Melodía de la Calle, was released on April 22, 2008.

Dize participated in a beach festival, "Back to School", on August 9, 2008. He performed at the Cedar Hall on February 2, 2009, in Boston, Massachusetts. In the performance he collaborated with DJs such as DJ Shorty, DJ Problem, and DJ Luis Morales.

== Personal life ==
Dize is married to Briggitt Maria Garces and he has six children; Anthwan, Kamille, Anyelina, Valentina, Eva and Lisa.

== Discography ==
=== Studio albums ===
- 2008: La Melodía De La Calle
- 2009: La Melodia De La Calle "Updated"
- 2015: La Melodía De La Calle, 3rd Season
- 2025: La Melodía Con La Calle, Vol. 1

=== Singles ===
- "Quizás" (2007)
- "Permitame" (featuring Yandel) (2008)
- "Entre los Dos" (2008) Composed by Wise the Gold Pen
- "Vamos a Hacerlo" (featuring Jayko el Prototipo) (2008)
- "Mi Mayor Atracción" (2009)
- "Solos" (featuring Plan B) (2009)
- "El Doctorado" (2009) Composed by Wise the Gold Pen
- "Mi Amor Es Pobre" (featuring Arcángel and Ken-Y) (2010) Composed by Wise the Gold Pen
- "Terminalo" (2011)
- "Un Chance" (2011)
- "Si Me Safe" (2011)
- "Al Limite de la Locura" (2012)
- "Bandida" (featuring Voltio) (2012)
- "Bandida" (remix) (featuring Voltio and Yomo) (2013)
- "Prometo Olvidarte" (2013) Composed by Wise the Gold Pen
- "No Pretendo Enamorarte" (2014)
- "Prometo Olvidarte (remix)" (featuring Yandel) (2014) Composed by Wise the Gold Pen
- "Hasta Verla Sin Na'" (featuring Arcángel) (2014)
- "Ruleta Rusa" (2014)
- "Duele el Amor" (2015)
- "Si Te Llego a Perder" (2015)
- "Quisiera" (2024)
- "Sin GPS" (2024)
- "Un Tequila Mas" (2025)

=== Featured singles ===
- "Bachata en Fukuoka" (remix) (with Juan Luis Guerra) (2010)
- "Si no le contesto" (remix) (With Plan B, Zion & Lennox (2010)
- "La Despedida" (remix) (with Daddy Yankee) (2010)
- "Hoy Lo Siento" (with Zion & Lennox) (2011)
- "Senda Maniática" (with Ñejo & Dalmata) (2011)
- "Deja Ver" (with Alexis & Fido) (2011)
- "La Corriente" (with Bad Bunny, album: Un Verano Sin Ti) (2022)
