= Llamé Pa' Verte (Bailando Sexy) =

- Promotional CD of the single

Single by Wisin & Yandel

from the album Pa'l Mundo
- Released: 2005
- Recorded: 2005
- Genre: Reggaeton
- Length: 3:14
- Producers: Luny Tunes; Nely "El Arma Secreta"

Wisin & Yandel singles chronology
"Mírala Bien" (2005)	"Llamé Pa' Verte (Bailando Sexy)" (2005)	"Noche de Sexo" (2005)

"Llamé Pa' Verte (Bailando Sexy)" (English: "I Called to See You (Dancing Sexy)") is the third single of Wisin & Yandel's album Pa'l Mundo, released in 2005.

== Charts ==
=== Weekly charts ===
Chart (2006)	Peak position
US Billboard Hot 100	100
US Hot Latin Songs (Billboard)	1
US Latin Rhythm Airplay (Billboard)	1
US Tropical Airplay (Billboard)	1

=== Year-end charts ===
Chart (2006)	Position
US Hot Latin Songs (Billboard)	5
