= Rakata (song) =

Single by Wisin & Yandel

from the album Mas Flow 2 and Pa'l Mundo
- Released: January 27, 2005
- Recorded: 2005
- Genre: Reggaeton
- Length: 2:52
- Label: Machete
- Songwriters: Josías de la Cruz; Juan Luis Morera; Llandel Veguilla
- Producers: Luny Tunes; Nely

Wisin & Yandel singles chronology
"No Me Dejes Solo" (2005)	"Rakata" (2005)	"Mírala Bien" (2005)

"Rakata" is the debut single by Puerto Rican reggaeton duo Wisin & Yandel, released on January 27, 2005, by Machete Music. It is from the Luny Tunes-produced compilation Mas Flow 2, and was later included on Wisin & Yandel's fifth studio album Pa'l Mundo. The song was produced by Luny Tunes and Nely "El Arma Secreta". It is known to be one of their signature songs, as well as being their first major-charting single. Since the single's release, it has become one of the top-selling singles of 2005 and 2006 during the mainstream success years of reggaeton music. It was nominated for Best Latin/Reggaetón Track at the 22nd Annual International Dance Music Awards in 2007, which was ultimately won by Shakira and Wyclef Jean for their number one single "Hips Don't Lie".

== Music video ==
Wisin & Yandel in the video for "Rakata."

The music video, directed by Marlon Peña, was released in late 2005 by Universal Music Group and Mas Flow Inc. Typical of the time during which reggaeton was beginning to get mainstream success, the video mainly showed the duo and a group of dancing women in a large crowd of people. Luny from the production duo makes a cameo appearance in the video as well.

== Chart performance ==
Since the single's release, it has become one of the top-selling singles of the end of 2005 and the beginning of 2006. It debuted on the Billboard Hot 100 at number 97, and peaked at number 85, becoming one of the first few reggaeton singles to chart on the Hot 100. It also entered the Billboard Hot 100 Airplay chart, peaking at number 60. It was a hit on the U.S. Billboard Hot Latin Songs chart, peaking at number 2. The single had international success, peaking at number 15 on the Portuguese Singles Chart.

== Track listings and formats ==
US CD single

1. "Rakata" (Album Version) – 2:55
2. "Rakata" (Remix) – 3:33
3. "Rakata" (Hip Hop Remix) – 3:24
4. "Rakata" (Tigerstyle Remix) – 4:05
5. "Rakata" (Album Version Instrumental) – 2:55
6. "Rakata" (Hip Hop Remix A capella) – 3:21

European 12-inch vinyl

- A1: "Rakata" (Album Version)
- A2: "Rakata" (Tigerstyle Remix)
- B1: "Rakata" (Tigerstyle Bhangra Remix)

== Official versions ==
- Album Version – 2:55
- Remix – 3:33
- Hip Hop Remix – 3:24
- Tigerstyle Remix – 4:05
- Instrumental – 2:55
- Hip Hop Remix A capella – 3:21

== Charts ==
Chart (2005–06)	Peak position
U.S. Billboard Hot 100	85
U.S. Billboard Hot 100 Airplay	60
U.S. Billboard Rhythmic Top 40	38
U.S. Billboard Hot Latin Songs	2
U.S. Billboard Tropical Songs	2
U.S. Billboard Latin Rhythm Airplay	1
Portugal Singles Chart	15

== See also ==
- List of Billboard Latin Rhythm Airplay number ones of 2005
- List of Billboard Latin Rhythm Airplay number ones of 2006
