= Mírala Bien =

Single by Wisin & Yandel

from the album Pa'l Mundo
- Released: 2005
- Recorded: 2005
- Genre: Reggaeton
- Length: 2:36
- Label: Machete
- Songwriters: Juan Luis Morera; Llandel Veguilla
- Producers: Luny Tunes, Thilo

Wisin & Yandel singles chronology
"Rakata" (2005)	"Mírala Bien" (2005)	"Llamé Pa' Verte (Bailando Sexy)" (2005)

Music video
- "Mírala Bien" on YouTube

"Mírala Bien" (English: "Take a Good Look at Her") is a song by Puerto Rican reggaeton duo Wisin & Yandel. It was released in 2005 by Machete Music and served as the second single of their fourth studio album, Pa'l Mundo (2005).The song has been mention in numerous articles as it is one of the duo's best songs. They still perform this song in concerts.

== Music video ==
The video clip begins with a woman walking down a street, and then Yandel begins to sing while that woman is seen in a car. In Wisin's rapping, he is accompanied by women with a choreography. Yandel is also shown with a woman, caressing her. In the middle of the video, until the end, Wisin & Yandel begin to interpret the song, around cars, people, and the women that are dancing. The video appears on the DVD of the deluxe edition of Pa'l Mundo along with a behind the scenes look of the making of the video. It was directed by David Impelluso.

== Charts ==
Chart (2005)	Peak position
US Latin Rhythm Airplay (Billboard)	31
