= No Me Dejes Solo =

2004 single by Daddy Yankee

Single by Daddy Yankee featuring Wisin & Yandel and Glory

from the album Barrio Fino
- Released: April 5, 2004
- Genre: Reggaeton
- Length: 2:50
- Label: Interscope; El Cartel
- Songwriters: Ramón Ayala; Juan Luis Morera Luna; Llandel Veguilla Malavé
- Producers: Monserrate & DJ Urba; Fido

Daddy Yankee singles chronology
"Gasolina" (2004)	"No Me Dejes Solo" (2004)	"Lo Que Pasó, Pasó" (2004)

Wisin & Yandel singles chronology
"No Me Dejes Solo" (2004)	"Rakata" (2005)

"No Me Dejes Solo", (English: "Don't Leave Me Alone") is a 2004 single by Daddy Yankee. It features Wisin & Yandel and Glory.

== Charts ==
Chart (2004)	Peak position
US Billboard Hot Latin Songs	32
US Billboard Latin Rhythm Airplay	8
US Billboard Latin Tropical Airplay	8
