= Yo Te Quiero =

Single by Wisin & Yandel

from the album Los Vaqueros
- Released: January 13, 2007
- Recorded: 2006
- Genre: Reggaeton
- Length: 3:27
- Songwriters: Juan Luis Morera Luna & Llandel Veguilla Malavé Salazar
- Producers: Nesty "La Mente Maestra" & Victor "El Nasi"

Wisin & Yandel singles chronology
"Pegao" (2006)	"Yo Te Quiero" (2007)	"Sexy Movimiento" (2007)

"Yo Te Quiero" (English: "I Love You") is a song by Wisin & Yandel, released as the second single from the album Los Vaqueros.

== Remixes ==
There has been two official remixes, one featuring Latin pop singer Luis Fonsi and the other featuring R&B singer Jayko instead of Yandel. Both versions can be found on the album Los Vaqueros Wild Wild Mixes.

== Chart positions ==
Chart (2007)	Peak position
U.S. Billboard Hot Latin Songs	29
U.S. Billboard Latin Tropical Airplay	22
U.S. Billboard Latin Rhythm Airplay	14
