= Plaza de Toros La Macarena =

Building in Medellín, Colombia

Coordinates: 6°14′59″N 75°34′50″W

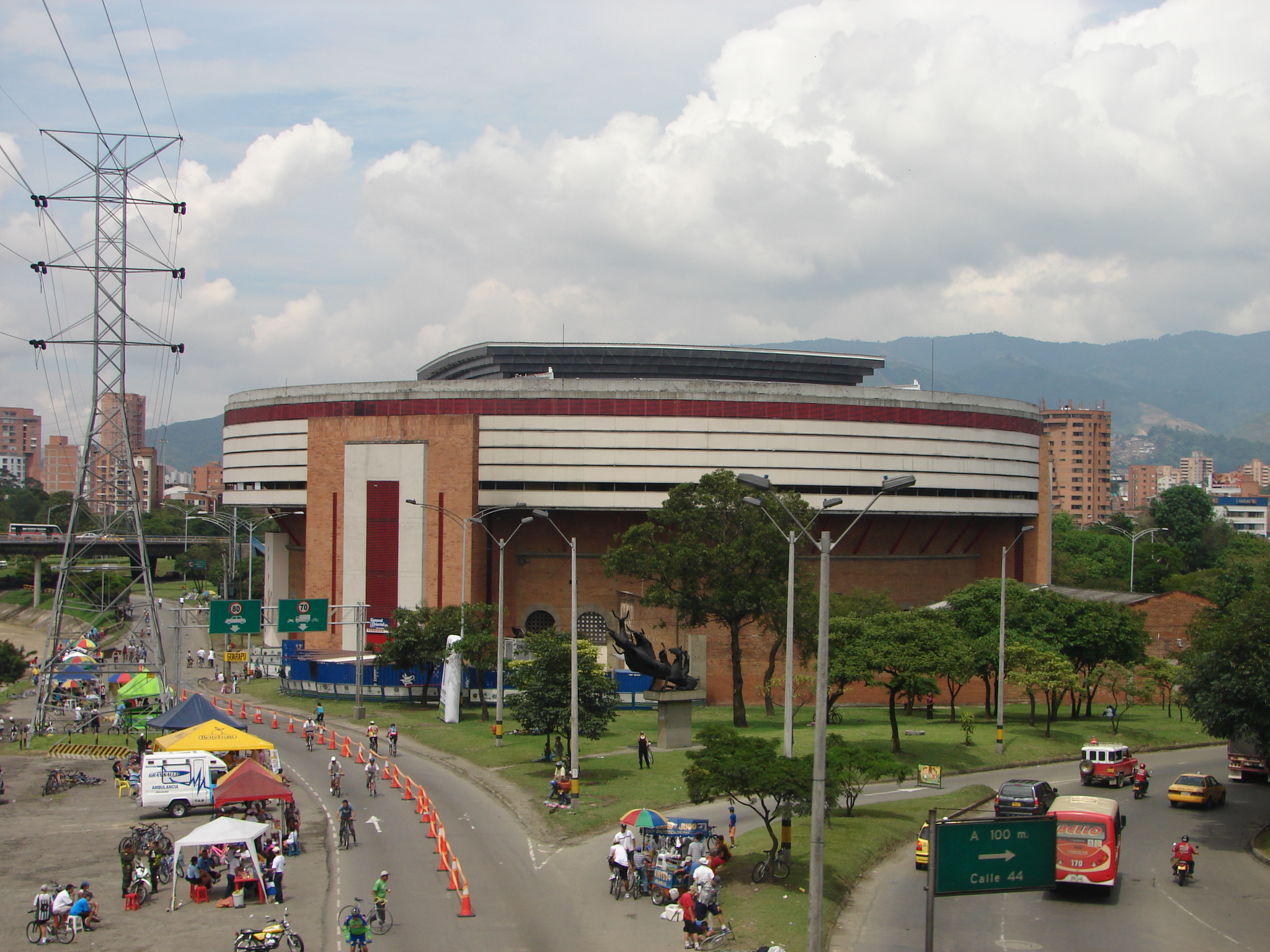
- Interactive map of Plaza de Toros La Macarena
- Full name: Plaza de Toros La Macarena
- Location: Medellín, Colombia
- Capacity: 15,000

Construction
- Opened: 1945

Plaza de Toros La Macarena is a bullring in Medellín, Colombia. It is currently used for bullfighting and concerts. The stadium holds 15,000 spectators. It was opened in 1945.
