= Noche de Sexo =

Single by Wisin & Yandel featuring Romeo Santos

from the album Pa'l Mundo
- Released: November 12th, 2005
- Recorded: 2005
- Genre: Reggaeton
- Length: 3:25
- Songwriters: Nely, Romeo Santos, Wisin, Yandel, Dj Casper, Nesty

Wisin & Yandel featuring Romeo Santos singles chronology
"Llamé Pa' Verte (Bailando Sexy)" (2005)	"Noche de Sexo" (2005)	"Pam Pam" (2005)

Aventura singles chronology
"Un Beso" (2005)	"Noche de Sexo" (2005)	"Los Infieles" (2005)

"Noche de Sexo" (English: "Night of Sex") is a song by Wisin & Yandel, featuring Romeo Santos of Aventura. The single reached number 17 on the Billboard Hot Latin Tracks Year-End Chart of 2005. This was the first collaboration between the two groups. The song was nominated for Hot Latin Songs of the Year by Vocal Duet or Collaboration at the 2005 Latin Billboard Music Awards losing to "La Tortura" by Shakira and Alejandro Sanz.

== Charts ==
=== Weekly charts ===
Chart (2006)	Peak position
US Bubbling Under Hot 100 (Billboard)	11
US Hot Latin Songs (Billboard)	4
US Tropical Airplay (Billboard)	10

=== Year-end charts ===
Chart (2006)	Position
US Hot Latin Songs (Billboard)	19
