= Pam Pam =

- Promotional CD of the single

Single by Wisin & Yandel

from the album Pa'l Mundo, Deluxe Edition
- Released: May 16, 2006
- Recorded: 2005
- Genre: Reggaeton
- Length: 3:47
- Label: WY Records, Machete
- Producers: Luny Tunes, Tainy, Naldo

Wisin & Yandel singles chronology
"Noche de Sexo" (2005)	"Pam Pam" (2006)	"Pegao" (2006)

Music video
- "Pam Pam" on YouTube

"Pam Pam" is a single by Wisin & Yandel from the deluxe edition of their fifth studio album Pa'l Mundo. The song reached big recognition in many Spanish-speaking countries and among Latin community in the United States.

On November 30, 2006, "Pam Pam" took the number-one spot on the United States Billboard Hot Latin Tracks chart from David Bisbal's "¿Quién Me Iba a Decir?" The song samples "Llorando se fue" by Bolivian group Los Kjarkas. The catchy song was performed in the Latin Grammy Awards in New York, broadcast by Univisión. The remix of "Pam Pam" features Romeo Santos of bachata group Aventura.

== Music video ==
The music video of "Pam Pam" was shot in Brazil where Wisin y Yandel appear in beaches, parties and cultural places. The clip was filmed in 36 hours, with Brazilian team and cast. The production was made by the producer Thiago Arraes and directed by David Impelluso. It has been viewed over 123 million times on YouTube.

== Charts ==
=== Weekly charts ===
Chart (2006)	Peak position
Chile (National-Report)	5
US Bubbling Under Hot 100 (Billboard)	4
US Hot Latin Songs (Billboard)	1
US Latin Rhythm Airplay (Billboard)	1
US Tropical Airplay (Billboard)	1

=== Year-end charts ===
Chart (2006)	Position
US Hot Latin Songs (Billboard)	14
Chart (2007)	Position
US Hot Latin Songs (Billboard)	16

== See also ==
- List of Billboard Latin Rhythm Airplay number ones of 2006
- List of Billboard Latin Rhythm Airplay number ones of 2007
