= Pegao =

Single by Wisin & Yandel

from the album Los Vaqueros
- Released: October 24, 2006
- Recorded: 2006
- Genre: Reggaeton
- Length: 3:52
- Songwriters: Juan Luis Morera Luna & Llandel Veguilla Malavé Salazar
- Producers: Nesty "La Mente Maestra" & Victor "El Nasi"

Wisin & Yandel singles chronology
"Pam Pam" (2006)	"Pegao" (2006)	"Yo Te Quiero" (2007)

"Pegao" (From "pegado"; English: "stuck, glued") is the first single by Wisin & Yandel from the album Los Vaqueros. Listeners interpret the song as expressing a desire to dance extremely close. "Ella lo baila pegao, pegao, pegao (she likes to dance mad close, close, close)".

== Remixes ==
There have been a number of remixes, one featuring Zodiac and the other can be found in the album Los Vaqueros Wild Wild Mixes which features Reggae artist Elephant Man. And another one with the former WY Record member El Tio.

== Charts ==
Chart (2006–2007)	Peak position
Chile Airplay (Los 40)	6
U.S. Billboard Hot Latin Songs	10
U.S. Billboard Latin Tropical Airplay	1
U.S. Billboard Latin Rhythm Airplay	2
Venezuela (RecordReport)	19
