= Ricardo Arjona discography =

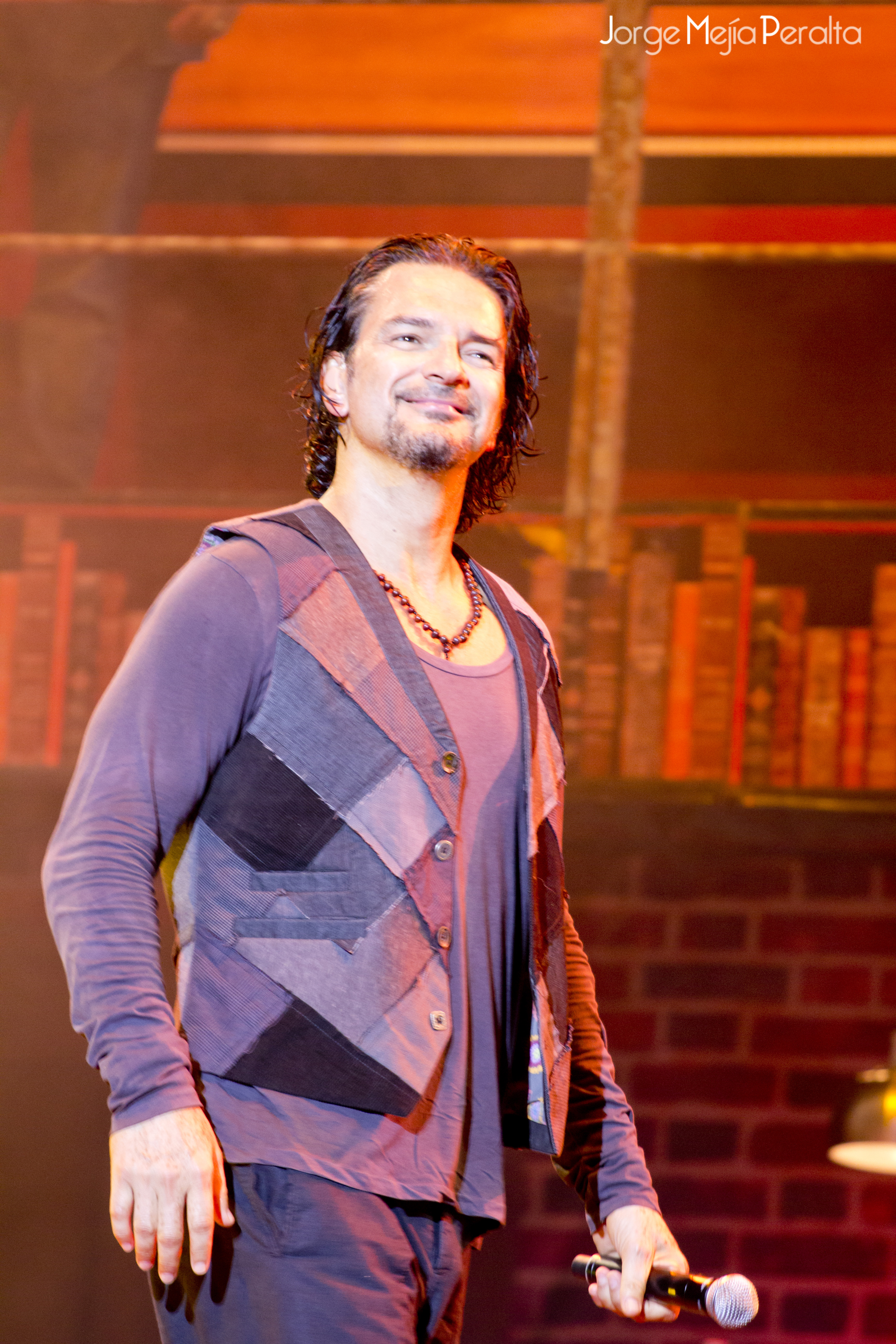
- Ricardo Arjona at the Metamorfosis World Tour
- Studio albums: 18
- Live albums: 4
- Compilation albums: 16
- Singles: 62
- Music videos: 93
- Promotional singles: 5

Guatemalan recording artist Ricardo Arjona has released eighteen studio albums, sixteen compilation albums, four live albums, sixty-two singles, five promotional singles, and ninety-three music videos. Four of his albums have reached the number-one position on the Billboard Top Latin Albums chart, while four of his singles have topped the Billboard Latin Songs chart. Throughout his career, Arjona has sold approximately 20 million albums worldwide, making him one of the most successful Latin artists in music history. Arjona released his debut album, Déjame Decir Que Te Amo, in 1985. However, his experiences while recording the album and its commercial failure led to his decision to abandon the music industry. Despite this decision, Arjona returned and released Jesús, Verbo No Sustantivo in 1988. In 1991, Arjona signed a record deal with Sony Music and released his third studio album, Del Otro Lado del Sol.

His 1992 release, Animal Nocturno, garnered international success and spawned the singles "Mujeres" and "Primera Vez". His album Historias was also commercially successful; two million copies were sold and it received twenty-seven platinum and two diamond certifications. The album produced the hits "Te Conozco" and "Señora De Las Cuatro Decadas". According to Arjona, Animal Nocturno and Historias are the best-selling albums of his career. The singer's albums Si el Norte Fuera el Sur and Sin Daños a Terceros were released in 1996 and 1998, respectively. In December 1998, Arjona recorded his first live album, Vivo, at the Hippodrome in Guatemala City in front of more than 100,000 people; it was later released in 1999. The song "Desnuda" was released as a single, and became his first to top the Billboard Hot Latin Tracks chart.

Galería Caribe, Arjona's eighth album, was released in 2000 and peaked at number-one on the Billboard Top Latin Albums and Latin Pop Albums chart. It contained the hit single "Cuando", which topped the Billboard Hot Latin Tracks chart. Santo Pecado, released in 2002, became a commercial success and contained the hit singles "El Problema" – which became his third number-one on the Billboard Hot Latin Songs chart – and "Minutos". In 2005, he released the album Adentro, which sold over one million copies and produced the singles "Pingüinos En La Cama" – which featured Spanish singer Chenoa, "Mojado" – which featured American Tejano/Norteño band Intocable – and the top-ten hit "Acompañame A Estar Solo".

After spending the majority of his career signed to Sony Music, Arjona signed a long-term record deal with Warner Music Latina in September 2008. Arjona then announced he would release his eleventh studio album, 5to Piso, on 18 November 2008. The album was preceded by the first single, "Como Duele", which was released in September 2008 and reached number two on the Billboard Hot Latin Songs chart and number-one on the Latin Pop Songs chart. The album debuted at number-one on the Billboard Top Latin Albums chart, became Arjona's second number-one on that chart, and has sold more than one million copies worldwide. His album Poquita Ropa followed in 2010, the first single from which, "Puente", is an anthem about the relationship between Cuba and the United States. In 2011, Arjona released his thirteenth studio album, Independiente, the first under his own record label Metamorfosis.

== Albums ==
=== Studio albums ===
List of studio albums, with selected chart positions, sales figures and certifications
Title	Album details	Peak chart positions							Certifications	Sales
Title	Album details	ARG^{[B]}	CHI^{[C]}	MEX^{[A]}	US	US Heat	US Latin	US Latin Pop	Certifications	Sales
Déjame Decir Que Te Amo	Released: 1985; Label: Barca Discos / Dideca; Formats: cassette	–	–	–	–	–	–	–		
Jesús, Verbo No Sustantivo	Released: 1988; Label: Sony Music; Formats: CD, cassette	–	–	–	–	–	–	–		
Del Otro Lado del Sol	Released: September 17, 1991; Label: Sony Music; Formats: CD, cassette	–	–	–	–	–	–	–		
Animal Nocturno	Released: February 9, 1992; Label: Sony Music; Formats: CD, cassette	10	3	–	–	–	13	11	CAPIF: Platinum; RIAA: 2× Platinum (Latin)	CHI: 75,000^{[O]}; US: 500,000^{[F]}
Historias	Released: April 19, 1994; Label: Sony Music; Formats: CD, cassette	1	1	–	–	–	43	–	CAPIF: 4× Platinum; RIAA: 4× Platinum (Latin)	ARG: 350,000^{[P]}; CHI: 125,000^{[O]}; US: 400,000^{[F]}; World: 2,000,000^{[G]}
Si el Norte Fuera el Sur	Released: August 20, 1996; Label: Sony Music; Formats: CD	–	–	–	–	–	21	12	CAPIF: 3× Platinum; RIAA: 2× Platinum (Latin)	
Sin Daños a Terceros	Released: May 29, 1998; Label: Sony Music; Formats: CD	–	–	–	–	26	6	3	CAPIF: 3× Platinum; RIAA: 2× Platinum (Latin)	World: 700,000^{[H]}
Galería Caribe^{[D]}	Released: August 29, 2000; Label: Sony Music; Formats: CD	–	–	–	136	6	1	1	CAPIF: Platinum; RIAA: 2× Platinum (Latin)	US: 600,000^{[N]}; World: 1,000,000^{[Q]}
Santo Pecado^{[E]}	Released: November 19, 2002; Label: Sony Music; Formats: CD	1	–	1	–	5	3	3	CAPIF: 4× Platinum; RIAA: 2× Platinum (Latin)	US: 202,000^{[M]}
Adentro	Released: December 6, 2005; Label: Sony Music; Formats: CD, digital download	1	–	1	126	46	3	2	AMPROFON: 2× Platinum; CAPIF: 5× Platinum; RIAA: 2× Platinum (Latin)	US: 156,000^{[M]}; World: 1,000,000^{[J]}
5to Piso	Released: November 18, 2008; Label: Warner Music; Formats: CD, digital download	1	–	1	55	–	1	1	AMPROFON: Platinum + Gold; CAPIF: 3× Platinum; RIAA: Platinum (Latin)	US: 108,000^{[K]}; World: 1,000,000^{[K]}
Poquita Ropa	Released: August 24, 2010; Label: Warner Music; Formats: CD, digital download	1	–	1	43	–	1	1	AMPROFON: Platinum; CAPIF: Platinum; RIAA: Gold (Latin)	
Independiente	Released: October 4, 2011; Label: Metamorfosis; Formats: CD, digital download	1	–	1	65	–	1	1	AMPROFON: 2× Platinum; CAPIF: Platinum; RIAA: Platinum (Latin)	US: 75,000^{[R]}; World: 400,000^{[R]}
Viaje	Released: April 29, 2014; Label: Metamorfosis; Formats: CD, digital download	1	–	3	35	–	1	1	AMPROFON: 2× Platinum; RIAA: Gold (Latin)	US: 30,000^{[S]}
Circo Soledad	Released: April 21, 2017; Label: Metamorfosis; Formats: CD, digital download	1	–	–	146	–	2	1	RIAA: Gold (Latin)	
Blanco	Released: July 31, 2020; Label: Metamorfosis; Formats: CD, digital download, streaming	–	–	–	–	–	–	9	AMPROFON: Gold	
Negro	Released: December 3, 2021; Label: Metamorfosis; Formats: CD, digital download, streaming	–	–	–	–	–	–	–		
Seco	Released: January 17, 2025; Label: Metamorfosis; Formats: CD, digital download, streaming	–	–	–	–	–	–	–		
"–" denotes items which were not released in that country or failed to chart.

=== Compilation albums ===
List of compilation albums, with selected chart positions and certifications
Title	Album details	Peak chart positions					Certifications	Sales
Title	Album details	ARG^{[B]}	MEX^{[A]}	US	US Latin	US Latin Pop	Certifications	Sales
Oro Romántico: 20 Grandes Éxitos	Released: June 20, 1995; Label: Rodven Records; Formats: CD, cassette	–	–	–	–	–		
Éxitos a Mi Manera	Released: March 30, 1999; Label: Musical Productions Inc.; Formats: CD, cassette	–	–	–	–	–		
17 Éxitos	Released: May 22, 2001; Label: Camajan / Envidia; Formats: CD	–	–	–	–	–		
Arjona Tropical (with Various Artists)	Released: November 13, 2001; Label: Sony Discos; Formats: CD, cassette	–	–	–	–	–		
Mano a Mano (with Ricardo Montaner)	Released: November 20, 2001; Label: Warner Music; Formats: CD	–	–	–	–	–		
Colección de Oro	Released: January 22, 2002; Label: Sony Discos; Formats: CD	–	–	–	–	–		
Grandes Éxitos Vol. 2	Released: May 27, 2003; Label: Barca Discos; Formats: CD	–	–	–	–	–		
Lo Mejor De	Released: May 27, 2003; Label: Barca Discos; Formats: CD	–	–	–	–	–	CAPIF: Gold	
12 Grandes Éxitos	Released: August 5, 2003; Label: Sony Music; Formats: CD	–	–	–	–	–	CAPIF: Gold	
Lados B	Released: December 16, 2003; Label: Sony Music; Formats: CD	–	43	–	–	–		
Solo^{[L]}	Released: November 24, 2004; Label: Sony Music; Formats: CD	–	2	–	5	3	AMPROFON: Platinum; CAPIF: Gold	US: 119,000^{[M]}
Canciones	Released: 2005; Label: Sony Music; Formats: CD	–	–	–	–	–		
Quién Dijo Ayer	Released: August 21, 2007; Label: Sony Music; Formats: CD	1	1	59	2	1	AMPROFON: Platinum; CAPIF: 2× Platinum; RIAA: 2× Platinum (Latin)	
Simplemente Lo Mejor	Released: December 2, 2008; Label: Warner Latina; Formats: CD, digital download	–	7	–	33	7	AMPROFON: Gold; CAPIF: Platinum	
Trópico^{[D]}	Released: June 13, 2009; Label: Warner Latina; Formats: CD, digital download	–	23	–	–	–		
Lo Esencial de Ricardo Arjona	Released: 2010; Label: Warner Latina; Formats: CD, digital download	–	46	–	–	–		
Canciones de Amor	Released: January 23, 2012; Label: Sony Music; Formats: Digital download	–	–	–	16	5		
Sólo Para Mujeres	Released: January 22, 2013; Label: Sony Music; Formats: CD, digital download	–	–	–	6	3		
Apague la Luz y Escuche	Released: July 29, 2016; Label: Sony Music; Formats: CD, digital download	–	–	–	3	1		
Blanco y Negro	Released: December 3, 2021; Label: Sony Music; Formats: CD, digital download	–	–	–	46	8		
"–" denotes items which were not released in that country or failed to chart.

=== Live albums ===
List of live albums, with selected chart positions, sales figures and certifications
Title	Album details	Peak chart positions			Certifications	Sales
Title	Album details	US Heat	US Latin	US Latin Pop	Certifications	Sales
Vivo	Released: October 5, 1999; Label: Sony Music; Formats: CD	20	6	3	CAPIF: Platinum (Latin); RIAA: 2× Platinum (Latin)	US: 326,000^{[I]}
Metamorfosis: En Vivo	Released: October 15, 2013; Label: Warner Music Latina; Formats: CD & DVD	-	3	1		
Circo Soledad En Vivo	Released: 2019; Label: Metamorfosis; Formats: Digital Download	-	-	-		
Hecho a la Antigua	Released: 2021; Label: Metamorfosis; Formats: Digital Download	-	-	-		
"–" denotes items which were not released in that country or failed to chart.

== Singles ==
List of singles, with selected chart positions
Single	Year	Peak chart positions			Album
Single	Year	US Latin	US Latin Pop	US Trop	Album
"Por Qué Es Tan Cruel el Amor"^{[E]}	1989	2	1	39	Jesús, Verbo No Sustantivo
"La Mujer Que No Soñé"	1991	46	28	–	Del Otro Lado del Sol
"Mujeres"	1993	6	–	–	Animal Nocturno
"Primera Vez"	1993	6	–	–	Animal Nocturno
"Te Conozco"	1994	3	–	–	Historias
"Señora de las Cuatro Décadas"	1994	7	6	–	Historias
"Realmente No Estoy Tan Solo"	1995	11	3	10	Historias
"Libre"	1995	29	6	–	Historias
"Si el Norte Fuera el Sur"	1996	–	9	17	Si el Norte Fuera el Sur
"Tu Reputación"	1997	18	2	–	Si el Norte Fuera el Sur
"Me Enseñaste"	1997	–	18	–	Si el Norte Fuera el Sur
"Ella y Él"	1997	24	8	–	Si el Norte Fuera el Sur
"Dime Que No"	1998	6	3	6	Sin Daños a Terceros
"Mentiroso"	1998	22	5	17	Sin Daños a Terceros
"Ella y Él / Historia de Taxi"	1999	–	20	19	Vivo
"Desnuda"	2000	1	1	5	Vivo
"Cuando"	2000	1	1	2	Galería Caribe
"Te Enamoraste de Ti"	2000	–	31	34	Galería Caribe
"A Cara o Cruz"	2001	–	28	23	Galería Caribe
"Mesías"	2001	19	11	12	Galería Caribe
"Porque Hablamos" (featuring Ednita Nazario)	2002	–	28	24	Galería Caribe
"El Problema"	2002	1	1	5	Santo Pecado
"Dame"	2003	8	4	25	Santo Pecado
"Minutos"	2003	5	3	39	Santo Pecado
"Duele Verte"	2003	21	14	–	Santo Pecado
"Acompáñame a Estar Solo"	2005	7	1	–	Adentro
"Pingüinos en la Cama" (featuring Chenoa)	2006	44	19	–	Adentro
"Mojado" (featuring Intocable)	2006	34	30	–	Adentro
"A Ti"	2006	14	3	–	Adentro
"De Vez en Mes"	2007	49	16	–	Adentro
"Quién"	2007	21	4	–	Quién Dijo Ayer
"Quiero"	2007	12	8	11	Quién Dijo Ayer
"Cómo Duele"	2008	2	1	3	5to Piso
"Sin Ti... Sin Mi"	2008	4	4	13	5to Piso
"Tocando Fondo"	2009	20	6	–	5to Piso
"Puente (Caribe)"	2010	–	36	–	Poquita Ropa
"Vida"	2010	–	–	–	Poquita Ropa
"Marta"	2011	–	–	–	Poquita Ropa
"El Amor"	2011	1	1	1	Independiente
"Fuiste Tú" (featuring Gaby Moreno)	2012	2	1	1	Independiente
"Mi Novia Se Me Está Poniendo Vieja"	2012	44	40	–	Independiente
"Te Quiero"	2012	1	1	1	Independiente
"Si Tu No Existieras"	2012	–	–	–	Independiente
"Apnea"	2014	10	2	–	Viaje
"Lo Poco Que Tengo"	2014	29	15	–	Viaje
"Cavernícolas"	2015	–	–	–	Viaje
"Nada Es Como Tú"	2016	–	–	–	Apague La Luz y Escuche
"Ella"	2017	–	–	–	Circo Soledad
"Porque Puedo"	2017	–	–	–	Circo Soledad
"Señorita"	2018	–	–	–	Circo Soledad
"El Cielo a Mi Favor"	2018	–	–	–	Circo Soledad
"Hongos"	2020	–	–	–	Blanco
"El Amor Que Me Tenía"	2020	–	–	–	Blanco
"Blues de la Notoriedad"	2020	–	–	–	Blanco
"El Amor Que Me Tenía" (featuring Pablo Alborán)	2020	–	–	–	Blanco
"Yo Me Vi (Autorretrato)"	2021	–	–	–	Negro
"El Flechazo y la Secuela"	2021	–	–	–	Negro
"De la Ilusión al Miedo"	2021	–	–	–	Negro
"Mal por Ti"	2021	–	–	–	Negro
"A Dónde Va el Amor"	2021	–	–	–	Negro
"Despacio Que Hay Prisa"	2024	–	–	–	Seco
"Mujer"	2025	–	–	–	Seco
"–" denotes items which were not released in that country or failed to chart.

== Promotional singles ==
List of promotional singles
Title	Year	Album
"Olvidarte"	1999	Sin Daños a Terceros
"Buenas Noches Don David"	1999	Sin Daños a Terceros
"Ni Tu Ni Yo" (featuring Paquita la del Barrio)	2009	5to Piso
"Por Si Regresas"	2009	5to Piso
"Mi Novia Se Me Está Poniendo Vieja"	2012	Independiente

== Music videos ==
Year	Title	Album
1985	"Esta Cobardía" (Chiquetete cover)	Non-album
1985	"No Renunciaré"	Canciones de Amor
1986	"Déjame Decir Que Te Amo"	Déjame Decir Que Te Amo
1988	"Jesús, Verbo No Sustantivo"	Jesús, Verbo No Sustantivo
1988	"Porque Es Tan Cruel el Amor"	Jesús, Verbo No Sustantivo
1988	"Uno + Uno = Uno"	Jesús, Verbo No Sustantivo
1988	"S.O.S Rescátame"	Jesús, Verbo No Sustantivo
1991	"Del Otro Lado del Sol"	Del Otro Lado del Sol
1992	"Libre"	Del Otro Lado del Sol
1993	"Mujeres"	Animal Nocturno
1993	"Jesús, Verbo No Sustantivo" (Re-recorded) (2 versions)	Animal Nocturno
1993	"Primera Vez"	Animal Nocturno
1993	"Quién Diría"	Animal Nocturno
1994	"Te Conozco"	Historias
1994	"Señora de las Cuatro Décadas"	Historias
1994	"Historia de un Taxi"	Historias
1994	"Realmente No Estoy Tan Solo"	Historias
1996	"Si el Norte Fuera el Sur"	Si el Norte Fuera el Sur
1996	"Se Nos Muere el Amor"	Si el Norte Fuera el Sur
1996	"Ella y Él"	Si el Norte Fuera el Sur
1997	"Tu Reputación"	Si el Norte Fuera el Sur
1998	"Dime Que No"	Sin Daños a Terceros
1998	"Olvidarte"	Sin Daños a Terceros
1998	"Desnuda"	Sin Daños a Terceros
1999	"Buenas Noches Don David"	Sin Daños a Terceros
1999	"Aquí Estoy"	Vivo
2000	"Cuándo"	Galería Caribe
2000	"Te Enamoraste de Ti"	Galería Caribe
2000	"Mesías"	Galería Caribe
2002	"El Problema"	Santo Pecado
2002	"Minutos"	Santo Pecado
2002	"La Nena (Bitácora de un Secuestro)"	Santo Pecado
2003	"Dame"	Santo Pecado
2003	"Duele Verte"	Santo Pecado
2005	"Acompáñame a Estar Solo"	Andando
2005	"Mojado" (with Intocable)	Andando
2006	"Pingüinos en la Cama" (2 versions; 2nd version with Chenoa)	Andando
2006	"De Vez en Mes"	Andando
2007	"Quién"	Quién Dijo Ayer
2007	"Quiero"	Quién Dijo Ayer
2008	"Cómo Duele"	5to Piso
2008	"Sin Ti... Sin Mí"	5to Piso
2009	"Ni Tú, Ni Yo" (with Paquita la del Barrio)	5to Piso
2009	"Tocando Fondo"	5to Piso
2010	"Puente"	Poquita Ropa
2010	"Vida"	Poquita Ropa
2011	"Marta"	Poquita Ropa
2011	"El Amor"	Independiente
2011	"Fuiste Tú" (with Gaby Moreno)	Independiente
2011	"Mi Novia Se Me Está Poniendo Vieja"	Independiente
2011	"Te Quiero"	Independiente
2011	"Si Tú No Existieras"	Independiente
2013	"Fuiste Tú" (Live)	Metamorfosis: En Vivo
2013	"Cada Quien Su Invierno"	Metamorfosis: En Vivo
2014	"Apnea"	Viaje
2014	"Lo Poco Que Tengo"	Viaje
2014	"Cavernícolas"	Viaje
2016	"Nada Es Como Tú"	Apague la Luz y Escuche
2017	"Ella"	Circo Soledad
2017	"Porque Puedo"	Circo Soledad
2018	"Señorita"	Circo Soledad
2018	"El Cielo a Mi Favor"	Circo Soledad
2020	"Hongos" (Original and acoustic versions)	Blanco
2020	"El Amor Que Me Tenía"	Blanco
2020	"Blues de la Notoriedad"	Blanco
2020	"Sobrevivirás"	Blanco
2020	"Tarot"	Blanco
2020	"El Invisible"	Blanco
2020	"No Es el Momento"	Blanco
2020	"Ella Baila Sola"	Blanco
2020	"Mamás de Moisés"	Blanco
2020	"Batichica"	Blanco
2020	"El Amor Que Me Tenía" (with Pablo Alborán) – Lyric Video	Blanco
2020	"Hacer Patria"	Blanco
2020	"Invierno de Cristal"	Blanco
2020	"Tu Retrato"	Blanco
2020	"Morir por Vivir"	Blanco
2020	"Blues de la Notoriedad" (with Gaby Moreno)	non-album
2021	"Yo Me Vi (Autorretrato)"	Negro
2021	"El Flechazo y la Secuela"	Negro
2021	"De la Ilusión al Miedo"	Negro
2021	"El Bobo"	Negro
2021	"Ella Sabe"	Negro
2021	"No Cambia Nada"	Negro
2021	"Fluye"	Negro
2021	"Penthouse"	Negro
2021	"Mal por Ti"	Negro
2021	"A Dónde Va el Amor"	Negro
2024	"Despacio Que Hay Prisa"	Seco
2025	"Mujer"	Seco

== Notes ==
- ^{A} In Mexico, both Hung Medien and AMPROFON websites are used to retrieve chart positions.
- ^{B} In Argentina, from 1991 to 1998, chart positions shown were published in Billboard's "Hits of the World" section. From 2000 onwards, chart information shown is provided by CAPIF.
- ^{C} Chilean chart information was published in Billboard's "Hits of the World" section, which was provided by the courtesy of the Asociacion Fonográfica de Chile (IFPI Chile).
- ^{D} Trópico charted at No.9 on the US Tropical Albums.
- ^{E} Originally released in 1989, the chart positions for "Por Qué Es Tan Cruel El Amor" belong to the version included in Solo (2004), and released as a single in 2005 to promote the album.
- ^{F} Animal Nocturno and Historias US sales figures as of November 1994.
- ^{G} Historias US sales figures as of January 2011.
- ^{H} Sin Daños a Terceros sales figures as of August 1998.
- ^{I} Vivo sales figures as of July 2011.
- ^{J} Adentro sales figures as of February 2006.
- ^{K} 5to Piso international sales figures as of July 2010 and US sales figures as of July 2011.
- ^{L} Solo charted at No.4 on the US Top Heatseekers.
- ^{M} Santo Pecado, Solo and Adentro sales figures as of September 2006.
- ^{N} Galeria Caribe sales figures as of October 2000.
- ^{O} Animal Nocturno and Historias Chilean sales figures as of September 1995.
- ^{P} Historias Argentinian sales figures as of November 1995.
- ^{Q} Galería Caribe worldwide sales figures as of May 2002.
- ^{R} Independiente US sales figures as of November 2012 and worldwide sales figures as of October 2012.
- ^{S} Viaje US sales figures as of January 2015.
