= Canciones de Amor (Ricardo Arjona album) =

Compilation album by Ricardo Arjona
- Released: January 23, 2012
- Genre: Latin pop
- Label: Sony Music
- Producer: Ricardo Arjona, Lee Levin, Dan Warner

Ricardo Arjona chronology
Independiente (2011)	Canciones de Amor (2012)	Metamorfosis: En Vivo (2013)

Canciones de Amor is a compilation album released by Guatemalan singer-songwriter Ricardo Arjona on through Sony Music on January 23, 2012. It contains ballads from previous studio albums released by Arjona from 1993 to 2001. The album charted at number 16 on the US Billboard Top Latin Albums chart and at number five on the Billboard Latin Pop Albums component chart.

== Content and release ==
Canciones de Amor is the first compilation album released by Arjona since Lo Esencial De Ricardo Arjona in 2010. Canciones de Amor was digitally released in the United States on January 23, 2012. That same day, the record was made available in other territories such as Canada, Mexico and Venezuela. This digital compilation belongs to a series of albums being released by Sony Music, including other notable artists such as Alejandro Fernandez, Rocio Durcal, Sin Bandera, among others. Canciones de Amor contains mostly ballads from Arjona's first mainstream releases, namely Animal Nocturno (1992), Historias (1994), Si El Norte Fuera El Sur (1996), Sin Daños a Terceros (1998) and Galería Caribe (2000). The compilation also includes the US Billboard Latin Songs and Latin Pop Songs number-one hit, "Desnuda".

== Commercial performance ==
Canciones de Amor debuted and peaked at number 16 on the US Billboard Top Latin Albums chart the week ending February 25, 2012. The compilation charted simultaneously with Arjona's thirteenth studio album, Independiente, which was at number nine. On the Latin Pop Albums component chart, Canciones de Amor debuted at number 16 the week ending February 11, 2012. The following week, it jumped to number ten and, on its third week, it reached its peak of number five.

== Trackslisting ==
1. "Primera Vez" – 3:44
2. "Quién Diría" – 3:54
3. "Así de Ilógico" – 3:59
4. "Señora De Las Cuatro Decadas" – 5:05
5. "Amor de Tele" – 3:18
6. "Te Conozco" – 4:09
7. "Realmente No Estoy Tan Solo" – 3:52
8. "Tu Reputación" – 4:48
9. "Se Nos Muere El Amor" – 4:06
10. "Me Enseñaste" – 4:43
11. "Olvidarte" – 5:31
12. "Desnuda" – 4:15
13. "Dime Que No" – 4:26
14. "Lo Poco Que Queda De Mi" – 4:56

== Chart performance ==
Chart (2012)	Peak position
US Top Latin Albums (Billboard)	16
US Latin Pop Albums (Billboard)	5

== Release history ==
Country	Date	Format(s)	Label
United States	January 23, 2012	Digital download	Sony Music Entertainment
Venezuela	January 23, 2012	Digital download	Sony Music Entertainment
Canada	January 23, 2012	Digital download	Sony Music Entertainment
Mexico	January 23, 2012	Digital download	Sony Music Entertainment
