= List of awards and nominations received by Ricardo Arjona =

Ricardo Arjona awards and nominations
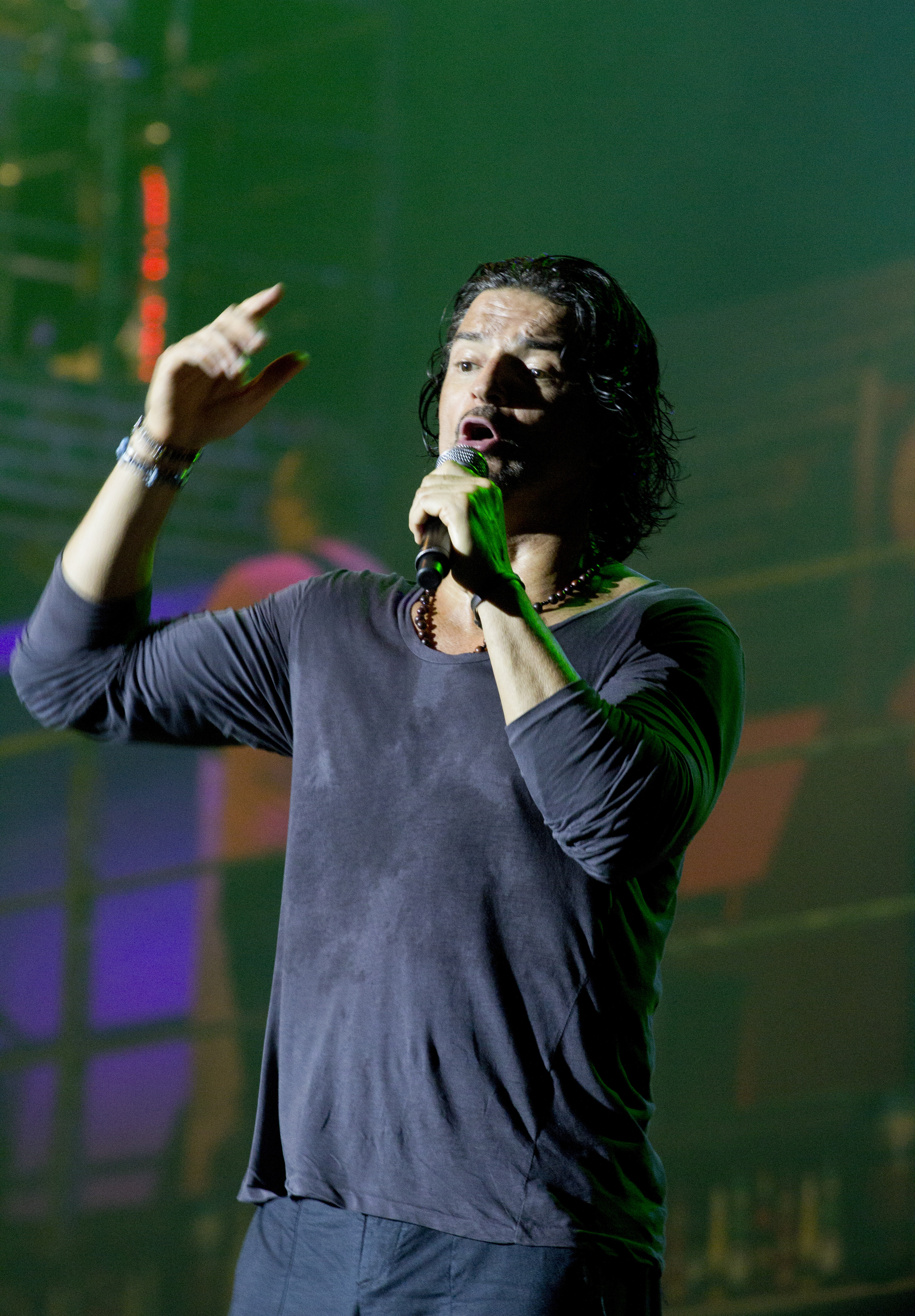
- Ricardo Arjona at the Metamorfosis World Tour
Awards and nominations
| Award | Wins | Nominations |
| Grammy | 1 | 6 |
| Latin Grammy Awards | 1 | 16 |
| Billboard Latin Music Awards | 5 | 15 |
| Latin Songwriters Hall of Fame | 1 | 2 |
| Lo Nuestro Awards | 3 | 22 |
| ASCAP Awards | 13 | 13 |
| Orgullosamente Latino Awards | 2 | 7 |
| Premios Juventud | 1 | 9 |

Totals (Note: Certain award groups do not simply award one winner. They acknowledge several different recipients, have runners-up, and have third place. Since this is a specific recognition and is different from losing an award, runner-up mentions are considered wins in this award tally. For simplification and to avoid errors, each award in this list has been presumed to have had a prior nomination.)
- Wins: 26
- Nominations: 79

Ricardo Arjona is a Guatemalan singer-songwriter who has received awards and nominations for his contributions to the music industry. He has sold approximately 80 million albums worldwide, becoming one of the most successful Latin artists of all time. The singer received his first American Society of Composers, Authors and Publishers (ASCAP) award in 1995, winning twice for his songs "Te Conozco" and "Detrás de Mi Ventana"—written for Mexican singer Yuri. Arjona has been nominated nine times at the Billboard Latin Music Awards, and in 1997 he became the first solo artist to receive Best Rock Album, with Si El Norte Fuera El Sur (1996). He received the award a second time in 1999 with Sin Daños a Terceros (1998).

Arjona received his only Lo Nuestro Award in 2004 with Santo Pecado (2002), which won Pop Album of the Year. ASCAP honored the singer in 2006 with the Latin Heritage Award. Arjona won his first Grammy Award in the Best Latin Pop Album category for Adentro (2005) in 2007. Arjona shared the award with Mexican singer Julieta Venegas, who was awarded for Limón y Sal (2006). That year, he also received the Latin Grammy Award for Best Male Pop Vocal Album for Adentro. At the Orgullosamente Latino Awards of 2010, he was declared "Latin Trayectory of the Year". Overall, Arjona has received 24 awards from 77 nominations.

== Grammy Awards ==
The Grammy Awards are awarded annually by the National Academy of Recording Arts and Sciences in the United States. Ricardo Arjona has received one award from five nominations.

| Year | Nominee / work | Award | Result |
|---|---|---|---|
| 2006 | Solo | Best Latin Pop Album | Nominated |
| 2007 | Adentro | Best Latin Pop Album | Won |
| 2010 | 5to Piso | Best Latin Pop Album | Nominated |
| 2011 | Poquita Ropa | Best Latin Pop Album | Nominated |
| 2013 | Independiente | Best Latin Pop Album | Nominated |
| 2022 | Hecho a la Antigua | Best Latin Pop Album | Nominated |

== Latin Grammy Awards ==
The Latin Grammy Awards are awarded annually by the Latin Academy of Recording Arts & Sciences in the United States. Arjona has received one award from fourteen nominations.

- 2014 Awards:

| Year | Nominee / work | Award | Result |
|---|---|---|---|
| 2003 | Santo Pecado | Best Male Pop Vocal Album | Nominated |
| 2003 | "El Problema" | Best Music Video | Nominated |
| 2006 | "Acompáñame A Estar Solo" | Record of the Year | Nominated |
| 2006 | "Acompáñame A Estar Solo" | Song of the Year | Nominated |
| 2006 | Adentro | Best Male Pop Vocal Album | Won |
| 2006 | "Mojado" | Best Music Video | Nominated |
| 2008 | Quién Dijo Ayer | Album of the Year | Nominated |
| 2008 | Quién Dijo Ayer | Best Male Pop Vocal Album | Nominated |
| 2009 | 5to Piso | Best Singer-Songwriter Album | Nominated |
| 2009 | "Como Duele" | Best Music Video | Nominated |
| 2011 | Poquita Ropa | Best Singer-Songwriter Album | Nominated |
| 2012 | "Fuiste Tú" | Record of the Year | Nominated |
| 2012 | "Fuiste Tú" | Song of the Year | Nominated |
| 2012 | Independiente | Album of the Year | Nominated |
| 2012 | Independiente | Best Singer-Songwriter Album | Nominated |
| 2013 | "Mi Novia Se Me Está Poniendo Vieja" | Song of the Year | Nominated |
| 2014 | Viaje | Best Singer-Songwriter Album | Nominated |
| 2017 | "Ella" | Song of the Year | Nominated |

== Billboard Latin Music Awards ==
The Billboard Latin Music Awards are awarded annually by the Billboard magazine in the United States. Arjona has received five awards from eleven nominations.

| Year | Nominee / work | Award | Result |
|---|---|---|---|
| 1997 | Si El Norte Fuera El Sur | Rock Album of The Year | Won |
| 1999 | Sin Daños a Terceros | Rock Album of The Year | Won |
| 2006 | Adentro | Best Male Latin Pop Album | Nominated |
| 2006 | "Por Qué Es Tan Cruel El Amor" | Male Latin Pop Airplay Song of the Year | Nominated |
| 2007 | "A Ti" | Male Latin Pop Airplay Song of the Year | Won |
| 2008 | Quién Dijo Ayer | Male Latin Pop Album of the Year | Nominated |
| 2009 | 5to Piso | Solo Latin Pop Album of the Year | Nominated |
| 2010 | Quinto Piso Tour | Latin Tour of the Year | Won |
| 2010 | Himself | Latin Pop Airplay Artist of the Year, Male | Nominated |
| 2010 | 5to Piso | Latin Pop Album of the Year | Nominated |
| 2010 | Himself | Latin Pop Albums Artist of the Year, Solo | Nominated |
| 2013 | Himself | Latin Pop Songs Artist of the Year, Solo | Nominated |
| 2013 | Himself | Latin Pop Albums Artist of the Year, Solo | Nominated |
| 2013 | Independiente | Latin Pop Album of the Year | Nominated |
| 2014 | "Himself" | Latin Pop Album of the Year | Nominated |
| 2015 | "Himself" | Latin Pop Songs Artist of the Year, Solo | Nominated |
| 2015 | "Himself" | Latin Pop Albums Artist of the Year, Solo | Nominated |
| 2015 | Viaje | Latin Pop Album of the Year | Nominated |
| 2016 | ViajeTour | Latin Tour of the Year | Nominated |
| 2017 | "Himself" | Lifetime Achievement Award | Won |
| 2018 | Circo Soledad Tour | Latin Tour of the Year | Nominated |
| 2018 | Circo Soledad Tour | Latin Pop Albums of the Year, Solo | Nominated |

== Latin Songwriters Hall of Fame ==
The Latin Songwriters Hall of Fame are awarded annually by the organization of the same name in the United States. Arjona has received one award from two nominations.

| Year | Nominee / work | Award | Result |
|---|---|---|---|
| 2013 | Himself | Latin Songwriters Hall of Fame | Nominated |
| 2014 | Himself | Latin Songwriters Hall of Fame | Won |

== Lo Nuestro Awards ==
The Lo Nuestro Awards are awarded annually by television network Univision in the United States. Arjona has received two awards from nineteen nominations.

| Year | Nominee / work | Award | Result |
|---|---|---|---|
| 1994 | Himself | Pop New Artist of the Year | Nominated |
| 1995 | Himself | Pop Male Artist of the Year | Nominated |
| 1998 | "Ella y Él" | Video of the Year | Won |
| 2000 | "Desnuda" | Pop Song of the Year | Nominated |
| 2002 | Galería Caribe | Pop Album of the Year | Nominated |
| 2004 | Santo Pecado | Pop Album of the Year | Won |
| 2004 | Himself | Pop Male Artist of the Year | Nominated |
| 2004 | "El Problema" | Pop Song of the Year | Nominated |
| 2007 | Adentro | Pop Album of the Year | Nominated |
| 2007 | Himself | Pop Male Artist of the Year | Nominated |
| 2007 | "Mojado" | Video of the Year | Nominated |
| 2010 | 5to Piso | Pop Album of the Year | Nominated |
| 2010 | Himself | Pop Male Artist of the Year | Nominated |
| 2010 | "Como Duele" | Pop Song of the Year | Nominated |
| 2011 | "Puente" | Video of the Year | Nominated |
| 2013 | Independiente | Pop Album of the Year | Nominated |
| 2013 | "Fuiste Tú" | Pop Song of the Year | Nominated |
| 2013 | Himself | Pop Male Artist of the Year | Nominated |
| 2014 | Himself | Pop Male Artist of the Year | Nominated |
| 2015 | Himself | Pop Male Artist of the Year | Nominated |
| 2015 | "Apnea" | Video of the Year | Nominated |
| 2015 | Himself | Excellence Award | Won |
| 2016 | "Lo Poco Que Tengo" | Song of the Year | Nominated |
| 2016 | Himself | Pop Male Artist of the Year | Nominated |
| 2020 | Himself | Pop Ballad Artist of the Year | Nominated |
| 2026 | Himself | Pop – Male Artist of the Year | Nominated |
| 2026 | "Mujer" | Pop/Ballad – Song of the Year | Nominated |

== American Society of Composers, Authors and Publishers Awards ==
The ASCAP Awards are awarded annually by the American Society of Composers, Authors and Publishers in the United States. Arjona has received nine awards from nine nominations.

| Year | Nominee / work | Award | Result |
|---|---|---|---|
| 1995 | "Te Conozco" | Pop/Contemporary Song | Won |
| 1995 | "Detrás de Mi Ventana" | Pop/Contemporary Song | Won |
| 2001 | "Desnuda" | Pop/Ballad Song of the Year | Won |
| 2004 | "El Problema" | Pop/Ballad Song of the Year | Won |
| 2006 | Himself | Latin Heritage Award | Won |
| 2006 | "Por Qué Es Tan Cruel El Amor" | Pop/Ballad Song of the Year | Won |
| 2007 | "A Ti" | Pop/Ballad Songs | Won |
| 2009 | "Quiero" | Pop/Ballad Songs | Won |
| 2010 | "Sin Ti... Sin Mi" | Pop/Ballad Songs | Won |
| 2012 | "El Amor" | Pop Songs | Won |
| 2013 | "Detrás de Mi Ventana" | Pop Songs | Won |
| 2013 | "Fuiste Tú" | Pop Songs | Won |
| 2013 | "Te Quiero" | Pop Songs | Won |

== Orgullosamente Latino Awards ==
The Orgullosamente Latino Awards are awarded annually by television network Ritmosón Latino in Mexico. Arjona has received two awards from seven nominations.

| Year | Nominee / work | Award | Result |
|---|---|---|---|
| 2006 | Himself | Latin Soloist of the Year | Won |
| 2009 | Himself | Latin Trayectory of the Year | Nominated |
| 2009 | "Como Duele" | Latin Song of the Year | Nominated |
| 2010 | Himself | Latin Trayectory of the Year | Won |
| 2010 | "Tocando Fondo" | Latin Video of the Year | Nominated |
| 2010 | 5to Piso | Latin Album of the Year | Nominated |
| 2010 | Himself | Latin Soloist of the Year | Nominated |

== Premios Juventud ==
The Premios Juventud are awarded annually by television network Univision in the United States. Arjona has received one award from nine nominations.

| Year | Nominee / work | Award | Result |
|---|---|---|---|
| 2006 | "Mojado" | La Combinación Perfecta (The Perfect Match) | Nominated |
| 2009 | Himself | Supernova Award | Won |
| 2012 | "Fuiste Tu" | La Combinación Perfecta (The Perfect Match) | Nominated |
| 2012 | Independiente | Lo Toco Todo (I Touch It All) | Nominated |
| 2012 | Himself | Voz del Momento (Voice of the Moment) | Nominated |
| 2012 | Himself | Mi Artista Pop (Pop Artist) | Nominated |
| 2012 | "Fuiste Tu" | Video Favorito (Favourite Music Video) | Nominated |
| 2012 | "Fuiste Tu" | Canción Corta Venas (Favorite Ballad) | Nominated |
| 2012 | Metamorfosis World Tour | Super Tour | Nominated |
| 2015 | "Himself" | Mi Artista Pop (Pop Artist) | Nominated |
| 2015 | Viaje World Tour | Super Tour | Nominated |
