= Mujeres (Ricardo Arjona song) =

Single by Ricardo Arjona

from the album Animal Nocturno
- Released: 1992
- Genre: Latin pop
- Length: 3:28
- Label: Sony Discos
- Songwriter: Ricardo Arjona

Ricardo Arjona singles chronology
"La Mujer Que No Soñé" (1991)	"Mujeres" (1992)	"Primera Vez" (1993)

"Mujeres" ("Women") a 1992 song by Guatemalan singer-songwriter Ricardo Arjona. It was released in 1992, and it became Arjona's first major international hit, becoming his first top 10 on the Billboard Hot Latin Songs chart in 1993, where it peaked at number 6. It is also recognized as one of Arjona's signature songs. The lyrics of the song begin with a reference about God creating Eve as a companion for Adam; "No sé quién las inventó / no sé quién nos hizo ese favor / tuvo que ser Dios / que vio al hombre tan solo y sin dudarlo pensó en dos".

== Charts ==
Chart (1993)	Peak position
US Hot Latin Songs (Billboard)	6

== Versions ==
The single originally featured on the album Animal Nocturno (1993), but has been re-recorded and reissued several times in his discography, as well as being covered by other artists:

- 1999 on Vivo
- 2000 on 12 Grandes Éxitos, sung in Portuguese
- 2004 on Solo (acoustic version)
- 2007 on Quién Dijo Ayer
- 2008 on Simplemente Lo Mejor
- 2009, sung by Thalía on Primera Fila
- 2009, sung by Elvis Crespo on Trópico
- 2013, sung by Thalía and María José on Viva Tour
