= Trópico (Ricardo Arjona album) =

Compilation album by Ricardo Arjona
- Released: 13 June 2009
- Genre: Salsa; merengue; pop; rock
- Length: 75:28
- Language: Spanish
- Label: Sony Music

Ricardo Arjona chronology
Simplemente Lo Mejor (2008)	Trópico (2009)	Poquita Ropa (2010)

Trópico (English: Tropic) is the fifteenth compilation album by the Guatemalan singer-songwriter Ricardo Arjona, released on 13 June 2009. The album consists of Arjona's past songs, drawn from Animal Nocturno (1992) to Galería Caribe (2000), which are performed either by him, or by other Latin artists, including Marc Anthony, Tito Nieves and Gilberto Santa Rosa. The album follows Sony's release of Simplemente Lo Mejor in December 2008, and it marks the second compilation album released after Arjona's departure to Warner Music in September 2008.

Trópico is a collection of Arjona's past hits re-recorded in a "tropical version", featuring genres such as salsa, bachata and merengue. Several songs included in the album were originally part of another compilation that Arjona released several years before, entitled Arjona Trópical, with the exception of "Historia De Taxi", which was borrowed from Quién Dijo Ayer. Trópico became a moderate commercial success, reaching number nine on the US Billboard Tropical Albums chart and number 23 in Mexico. The album received positive critical reception, with Jason Birchmeier from AllMusic awarding the album three-and-a-half stars out of five.

== Composition ==
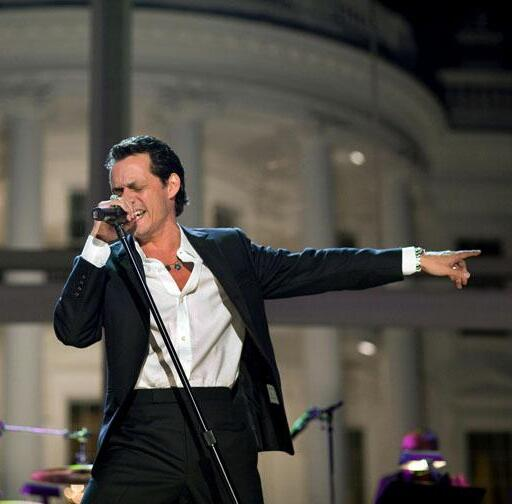
Marc Anthony sang with Arjona on the salsa version of "Historia de Taxi".

The album is a collection of Arjona's past hits re-recorded in a "tropical version", featuring genres such as salsa, bachata, merengue, vallenato, son and reggae. Several of Tropico's songs were originally included in another compilation Arjona released several years before, in 2001, entitled Arjona Tropical. The salsa version of "Historia De Taxi", which Arjona performed with American singer Marc Anthony and pianist Sergio George, was included on the album. The song was originally recorded for Arjona's compilation album Quién Dijo Ayer, released in August 2007. George said, "It's been interesting to work with two figures from different music worlds on the interest of making good music", and "every time a reunion of this kind happens, it [is] a reason to celebrate." "Buenas Noches Don David", originally recorded for Sin Daños a Terceros, was performed by Puerto Rican salsa singer Gilberto Santa Rosa. Arjona produced both the original version as well as the new salsa version, and provided additional background vocals for the new version. "Primera Vez", originally featured in Animal Nocturno, was performed by Victor Manuelle. "Mujeres" was re-recorded to feature a new merengue style, fitting the usual musical production of Elvis Crespo, who performed the song.

Tito Nieves was featured in "Tu Reputación", while "Quién Diría" was performed by Eddie Santiago. "Detrás de Mi Ventana" was composed by Arjona in 1993 and performed by the Mexican singer Yuri. It was released as a single from her album Nueva era (1993). The original version song became a hit, reaching No.1 on the US Hot Latin Songs chart for three weeks in 1994. The version included in Trópico was a cover of the original, which was performed by Arjona alongside Melina León. Huey Dunbar performed "Desnuda" which was originally included in Arjona's album Sin Daños a Terceros and was subsequently released as the lead single from his live album, Vivo (1999). "Te Conozco" was completely reworked, and the version included in the album was performed by the salsa duo Ricardo & Alberto. "Si El Norte Fuera El Sur" was transformed into a ska-style song, which he performed with Panteón Rococó; it was first included in Quién Dijo Ayer.

== Release ==
Trópico was digitally released by Sony Music in the United States, as well as several Latin American, countries on 18 June 2009. It received a physical release in the United States and the United Kingdom, as well as several other countries, on 23 June 2009. Trópico follows Sony's Simplemente Lo Mejor, issued six months before in December 2008, and marks the second compilation album released after the departure of Arjona to Warner Music in September 2008. Also, the album becomes the second Arjona compilation album including solo performances of his songs by other singers after Arjona Tropical in November 2001.

== Reception ==
Trópico entered the Top 100 Mexico at number 91 the week of its release. In its second week, the album jumped to position 62. Two weeks later, Trópico reached number 23, before dropping slowly and falling outside the top 100 positions, spending a total seven weeks on the chart. The album also charted at number nine on the US Billboard Tropical Albums. Trópico received moderate critical praise; Jason Birchmeier from AllMusic gave the album three-and-a-half stars out of five. He stated that although the album is "filled with high-quality music", it should not be mistaken for a new studio album. He concluded his review stating that Trópico is "a worthwhile listen, especially for those unfamiliar with the out of print Arjona Tropical material."

== Track listing ==
All tracks are written by Ricardo Arjona.

No.	Title	Performer(s)	Length
1.	"Historia de Taxi" (from Historias)	Ricardo Arjona, Marc Anthony	6:01
2.	"Buenas Noches Don David" (from Sin Daños a Terceros)	Gilberto Santa Rosa	5:25
3.	"Ella y Él" (from Si El Norte Fuera El Sur)	Arjona	6:13
4.	"Primera Vez" (from Animal Nocturno)	Victor Manuelle	4:23
5.	"Un Caribe En Nueva York" (from Galería Caribe)	Arjona	5:23
6.	"Mujeres" (from Animal Nocturno)	Elvis Crespo	5:39
7.	"Cuándo" (from Galería Caribe)	Arjona	4:33
8.	"Tu Reputación" (from Si El Norte Fuera El Sur)	Tito Nieves	4:46
9.	"Lo Poco Que Queda De Mí" (from Galería Caribe)	Arjona	4:56
10.	"Quién Diría" (from Animal Nocturno)	Eddie Santiago	4:34
11.	"Te Enamoraste De Ti" (from Galería Caribe)	Arjona	4:27
12.	"Detrás de Mi Ventana" (from Nueva era)	Melina León	4:51
13.	"Mesías" (from Galería Caribe)	Arjona	4:41
14.	"Desnuda" (from Sin Daños a Terceros)	Huey Dumbar	4:52
15.	"Si El Norte Fuera El Sur" (from Si El Norte Fuera El Sur)	Arjona, Panteón Rococó	4:31

== Chart performance ==
=== Charts ===
Chart (2007)	Peak position
US Billboard Tropical Albums	9
Mexican Albums (Top 100 Mexico)	23

== Release history ==
Country	Date	Format(s)	Label
Argentina	18 June 2009	Digital download	Sony Music
Italy	18 June 2009	Digital download	Sony Music
Mexico	18 June 2009	Digital download	Sony Music
Spain	18 June 2009	Digital download	Sony Music
United States	18 June 2009	Digital download	Sony Music
Venezuela	18 June 2009	Digital download	Sony Music
United Kingdom	23 June 2009	CD	Sony Music
United States	23 June 2009	CD	Sony Music
