= Simplemente Lo Mejor =

Greatest hits album by Ricardo Arjona
- Released: December 2, 2008
- Genre: Latin pop
- Label: Sony Music

Ricardo Arjona chronology
5to Piso (2008)	Simplemente Lo Mejor (2008)	Trópico (2009)

Simplemente Lo Mejor is a greatest hits album by Guatemalan singer-songwriter Ricardo Arjona that was released on December 2, 2008. The album is composed of Arjona's number-one hits, drawn from Animal Nocturno (1993) to Galería Caribe (2000). It served as his final project under the Sony Music label after signing a contract with Warner Music in 2008. A CD+DVD and a DVD edition of the album were released in several countries; these included a collection of music videos for the compilation's songs.

Simplemente Lo Mejor was made available one month after the release of Arjona's eleventh studio album, 5to Piso (2008). This led to speculation that the labels were in a fight to win Arjona's fanbase and sales. Simplemente Lo Mejor reached number seven on the Mexican Albums Chart, the US Billboard Latin Pop Albums chart and number 33 on the Billboard Top Latin Albums chart. It was awarded platinum certifications in Argentina and Mexico.

== Background and release ==
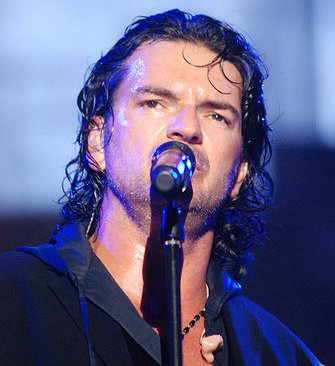
Despite Arjona signing a record deal in 2008 with Warner Music, Simplemente Lo Mejor was released by Sony Music.

=== Background ===
After spending the majority of his career signed to Sony and Sony BMG, Arjona signed a long-term recording deal with Warner Music Latina in September 2008. Iñigo Zabala, chairman of Warner Music Latin America commented that "he's an artist that fits perfectly with our company"; he also stated "We are a label that has a major catalog of songwriters and quality pop and rock from the likes of Maná, Alejandro Sanz, Laura Pausini, and now, Arjona." Arjona announced his eleventh studio album, 5to Piso, on 18 November 2008. In the first month of retail sales, approximately 200,000 copies were purchased; it went Platinum in Mexico, the United States and several other countries. It debuted at number one on Top Latin Albums, becoming his second chart-topper on that list, and sold more than one million copies worldwide. The album received a Grammy Award nomination for Best Latin Pop Album and a Latin Grammy Award nomination for Best Singer-Songwriter Album.

=== Release ===
While Warner Music released Arjona's new studio album, Sony Music released Simplemente Lo Mejor. This led to speculation that the labels were in a fight to win his fanbase and sales. 5to Piso hit shelves on 18 November 2008 in the United States, and Simplemente Lo Mejor followed on 2 December 2008. A CD+DVD edition and a DVD edition of the album were released that same day in the United States and Spain. At that time, Univisión named Simplemente Lo Mejor "a true collector's item that every fan of Arjona or just happy to his poetry should not be without."

== Reception ==
Professional ratings
Review scores
Source	Rating
AllMusic	4.5/5 stars

Simplemente Lo Mejor entered the Top 100 Mexico at number 35 the week of its debut. The following week, the album jumped to number 17 and, on its third week of release, reached its peak of number seven. It spent three weeks inside the top ten and 27 weeks on the chart. On the US Billboard Top Latin Albums chart, the album attained a peak of number 33 and stayed on the chart for 70 weeks. It performed better on the Latin Pop Albums component chart, where it reached a peak of number seven, remaining on the chart for 88 weeks. Simplemente Lo Mejor was awarded a platinum certification in Argentina and Mexico for 40,000 copies sold and shipped, respectively. Simplemente Lo Mejor received positive critical reception; Jason Birchmeier from AllMusic awarded the compilation four-and-a-half stars out of five and stated that the compilation is "nothing short of stellar, filled with major hits and showcasing perfectly Arjona's mid-'90s rise to fame."

== Track listing ==
Following, the track list of Simplemente Lo Mejor as is shown on the iTunes Store.

All tracks are written by Ricardo Arjona.

No.	Title	Length
1.	"Realmente No Estoy Tan Solo"	3:50
2.	"Quien Diría"	3:55
3.	"Historia de Taxi"	6:44
4.	"Se Nos Muere El Amor"	4:08
5.	"Mujeres"	3:27
6.	"Cuándo"	4:37
7.	"Señora de Las Cuatro Décadas"	5:11
8.	"Jesús, Verbo No Sustantivo"	6:45
9.	"Te Conozco"	4:10
10.	"Si El Norte Fuera El Sur"	4:54
11.	"Dime Que No"	4:26
12.	"Primera Vez"	3:45
13.	"Tu Reputación"	4:48
14.	"Olvidarte"	5:27
15.	"Me Enseñaste"	4:42
16.	"Desnuda"	4:16
17.	"Ella y Él"	6:15

== Personnel ==
Credits are taken from AllMusic.

- Ricardo Arjona – composer, direction, primary artist, producer, realization
- Carlos Cabral Jr. – arranger
- Carlos Greene – artist direction
- Waldo Madera – arranger
- Angel "Cucco" Peña – arranger, producer

== Chart performance ==
=== Charts ===
Chart (2008)	Peak position
Mexican Albums (Top 100 Mexico)	7
US Top Latin Albums (Billboard)	33
US Latin Pop Albums (Billboard)	7

=== Sales and certifications ===
Region	Certification	Certified units/sales
Argentina (CAPIF)	Platinum	40,000^{^}
Mexico (AMPROFON)	Gold	40,000^{^}
^{^} Shipments figures based on certification alone.

== Release history ==
Country	Date	Format(s)	Label
United States	2 December 2008	Digital download	Sony Music
United States	2 December 2008	CD+DVD, DVD	Sony Music
Mexico	2 December 2008	Digital download	Sony Music
Venezuela	2 December 2008	Digital download	Sony Music
