= Canciones de Amor =

Canciones de Amor may refer to:

- Canciones de Amor (Alejandra Guzmán album), 2006
- Canciones de Amor (Ricardo Arjona album), 2012
- Canciones de Amor (Yolandita Monge album), 2007
