= Metamorfosis: En Vivo =

Live album by Ricardo Arjona
- Released: 15 October 2013
- Genre: Latin Pop
- Length: 79:30
- Label: Warner Music Latina

Ricardo Arjona chronology
| Solo Para Mujeres (2013) | Metamorfosis: En Vivo (2013) | Viaje (2014) |

Metamorfosis: En Vivo is the second live album of Guatemalan singer-songwriter Ricardo Arjona. The album was released by Warner Music Latina on 15 October 2013, and includes tracks recorded during Arjona's Metamorfosis World Tour (2012-2013). The album includes a CD with 14 live tracks and a DVD with videos of the same tracks and five bonus tracks.

== Track listing ==
All tracks are written by Ricardo Arjona, except where noted.

Metamorfosis: En Vivo (CD)
| No. | Title | Writer(s) | Length |
|---|---|---|---|
| 1. | "Lo que está bien está mal" | Dan Warner | 4:40 |
| 2. | "Hay amores" | | 4:20 |
| 3. | "Desnuda" | | 3:44 |
| 4. | "Acompáñame a estar solo" | | 6:04 |
| 5. | "Historia de taxi" | | 9:17 |
| 6. | "Dime que no/Cuándo/Cómo duele" | | 6:13 |
| 7. | "Señora de las cuatro décadas" | | 5:03 |
| 8. | "Tarde (Sin daños a terceros)" | | 5:23 |
| 9. | "Fuiste tú" (featuring Gaby Moreno) | | 4:28 |
| 10. | "Te conozco" | | 5:20 |
| 11. | "Si el norte fuera el sur" | | 6:01 |
| 12. | "El problema" | | 6:58 |
| 13. | "Minutos" | | 5:13 |
| 14. | "Mujeres" | | 6:46 |
| Total length: | | | 79:30 |

Metamorfosis: En Vivo (DVD)
| No. | Title | Writer(s) | Length |
|---|---|---|---|
| 1. | "Lo que está bien está mal" | Dan Warner |
| 2. | "Animal nocturno" |
| 3. | "Hay amores" |
| 4. | "Desnuda" |
| 5. | "Acompáñame a estar solo" |
| 6. | "El amor" |
| 7. | "Mi novia se me está poniendo vieja" |
| 8. | "Historia de taxi" |
| 9. | "Dime que no/Cuándo/Cómo duele" |
| 10. | "Señora de las cuatro décadas" |
| 11. | "Reconciliación" |
| 12. | "Tarde (Sin daños a terceros)" |
| 13. | "Fuiste tú" (featuring Gaby Moreno) |
| 14. | "Te conozco" |
| 15. | "Te quiero" |
| 16. | "Si el norte fuera el sur" |
| 17. | "El problema" |
| 18. | "Minutos" |
| 19. | "Mujeres" |
| 20. | "[Bonus material]" |
| 21. | "Galería de fotos" |

== Chart performance ==
| Chart (2013) | Peak position |
|---|---|
| US Billboard 200 | 171 |
| US Top Latin Albums (Billboard) | 3 |
| US Latin Pop Albums (Billboard) | 1 |

== Certifications ==
| Region | Certification | Certified units/sales |
|---|---|---|
| Mexico (AMPROFON) | Platinum | 60,000^{^} |
^{^} Shipments figures based on certification alone.

== See also ==
- Ricardo Arjona discography
