= Por Amor (Ricardo Arjona album) =

Compilation album by Ricardo Arjona
- Released: May 27, 2003
- Genre: Pop
- Label: Barca Discos
- Producer: Elio Barbeito

Ricardo Arjona chronology
Santo Pecado (2002)	Por Amor (2003)	12 Grandes Éxitos (2003)

Por Amor (Grandes Éxitos Vol. 2 on cover) is a greatest hits/compilation album released on May 27, 2003, by Guatemalan singer-songwriter Ricardo Arjona.

== Track listing ==
All tracks are written by Ricardo Arjona

No.	Title	Length
1.	"Por Amor"	3:45
2.	"S.O.S. Rescátame"	4:39
3.	"Cómo Hacer A Un Lado El Pasado"	3:05
4.	"Y Ahora Tu Te Me Vas"	3:39
5.	"No Renunciaré"	4:11
6.	"Vete Con El Sol"	4:23
7.	"Romeo y Julieta"	3:50
8.	"Creo Que Se Llama Amor"	2:49
9.	"Guerrero A Su Guerra"	3:47
10.	"Fuego de Juventud"	3:07

== Personnel ==
- Ricardo Arjona – composer
- Elio Barbeito – producer
- Diego Burgos – mastering
