= Carlos Cabral Jr. =

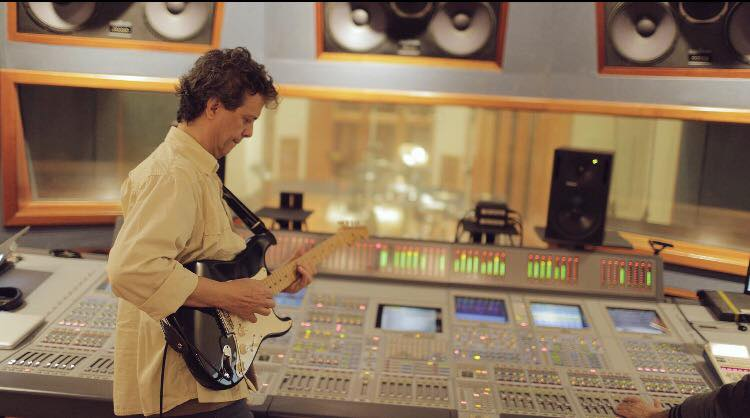
Junior Cabral recording in Monterrey, México.

Carlos Cabral Junior, also known as Junior Cabral, is a songwriter, producer, and arranger. Multiple Latin Grammy and Grammy Award winner, as well as music director for several Award-Winning World Tours. Latin Grammy nominations include; Album Of The Year, Record Of The Year, Best Vocal Pop Album, Best Ranchero Album, Best Norteño Album, Best Tejano Album, Best Vallenato Album. As producer/arranger/guitarist, Cabral has collaborated in more than 20 top #15 Billboard charting albums and singles.

== Career ==
Beginning in 1995 with La Trampa by Ana Bárbara, and after moving from Brazil to Mexico, Junior began his career as a producer in the Latin market. He then continued to work with Artists such as Intocable, Juan Gabriel, Lucero, Ana Gabriel, Nydia Rojas, Lucía Méndez, Julio Iglesias, Rocio Durcal, Pepe Aguilar, and Vicente Fernandez. In 2000, the start of his relationship with Ricardo Arjona resulted in his arrangement contribution to the album Galeria Caribe. Following the success of this album, Junior produced Arjona's top charting Album; Santo Pecado. Since then, he has collaborated as a producer/arranger and engineer in almost every album released by Arjona.

In 2002 and 2003 Junior produced Ana Bárbara #1 album Te Atrapare...Bandido, Ricardo Arjona's singles "El Problema" and "Minutos", the Santo Pecado album by Ricardo Arjona. From there on, Junior has produced top-selling and top-charting albums for Sony Music Latin, Universal Music, and Warner Music.

As a producer, arranger and guitarist he's been credited in more than 200 albums and has received +30 Latin Grammy Nominations and 5 Grammy Award Nominations, of which he has won 5 Latin Grammys and 1 Grammy Award for the album Adentro by Ricardo Arjona.

== Discography ==
Ricardo Arjona

- Galeria Caribe
- Santo Pecado
- Adentro
- Quinto Piso
- Poquita Ropa
- Independiente
- Apague la luz y escuche

Carlos Rivera

- Leyendas (Amor Eterno con Rocío Dúrcal)

Juan Gabriel

- Celebrando

Rocio Durcal

- Alma Ranchera
- Duetos

Intocable

- Intimamente...
- Crossroads cruce de caminos
- X

Jose Jose

- Ranchero

Lucía Méndez

- Canta un Homenaje a Juan Gabriel

Ana Bárbara

- Te atraparé... Bandido,
- Loca de amar,
- No es brujería

Lucero

- Aquí Estoy

Ana Gabriel

- Vivencias

Felipe Peláez

- Diferente

Shaila Dúrcal

- Shaila Dúrcal

Pedro Fernandez

- ¡Arránquense Muchachos!

== Awards ==
=== Latin Grammy Awards ===
Year	Category	Album	Award
2005	Latin Grammy Award for Best Norteño Album	Diez by Intocable	Latin Grammy Award
2005	Latin Grammy Award for Best Grupero Album	Loca de Amar by Ana Bárbara	Latin Grammy Award
2006	Latin Grammy Award for Best Male Pop Vocal Album	Adentro by Ricardo Arjona	Latin Grammy Award
2009	Latin Grammy Award for Best Norteño Album	Siempre by Costumbre	Latin Grammy Award
2010	Latin Grammy Nomination for Best Ranchero Album	Canta un Homenaje a Juan Gabriel by Lucía Méndez	Latin Grammy Nomination
2013	Latin Grammy Award for Best Cumbia/Vallenato Album	Diferente by Felipe Pélaez & Manuel Julián	Latin Grammy Award
2018	Latin Grammy Award for Best Tejano Album	Proyecto Insomnio	Nomination
2022	Latin Grammy Award for Best Tropical Album	El Mundo Esta Loco by Jorge Luis Chacin	Nomination
2023	Latin Grammy Award for Best Mariachi Album	Bordado A Mano by Ana Barbara	Nomination

=== Grammy Awards ===
Year	Category	Album	Award
2004	Grammy Award for Best Regional Mexican Album	Intimamente by Intocable	Grammy Award
2005	Grammy Award for Best Regional Mexican Album	Diez by Intocable	Nomination
2005	Grammy Award for Best Latin Pop Album	Solo by Ricardo Arjona	Nomination
2006	Grammy Award for Best Regional Mexican Album	No Es Brujería... by Ana Barbara	Nomination
2007	Grammy Award for Best Regional Mexican Album	Crossroads: Cruce de Caminos by Intocable	Nomination
2007	Grammy Award for Best Latin Pop Album	Adentro by Ricardo Arjona	Grammy Award
2010	Grammy Award for Best Latin Pop Album	5to Piso by Ricardo Arjona	Nomination
2011	Grammy Award for Best Latin Pop Album	Poquita Ropa by Ricardo Arjona	Nomination
2013	Grammy Award for Best Latin Pop Album	Independiente by Ricardo Arjona	Nomination
2024	Grammy Award for Best Musica Mexicana Album	Bordado A Mano by Ana Barbara	Nomination

=== Billboard Charts ===
Top Latin Albums
Album	Peak position
Independiente by Ricardo Arjona	1
5to Piso by Ricardo Arjona	1
Galería Caribe by Ricardo Arjona	1
Santo Pecado by Ricardo Arjona	3
Duetos by Rocío Dúrcal	12
Vivencias by Ana Gabriel	14

=== Yearly charts (El Problema by Ricardo Arjona) ===
Chart (2002–03)	Peak position
US Hot Latin Songs (Billboard)	1
US Latin Pop Airplay (Billboard)	1

Chart (2003)	Peak position
US Billboard Latin Songs	4
US Billboard Latin Pop Songs	3

=== Decade-End charts ===
Chart (2000–2009)	Peak position
US Billboard Latin Songs	89
US Billboard Latin Pop Songs	33

== Sources ==
- http://www.allmusic.com/artist/carlos-cabral-jr-mn0000141148
- http://www.allmusic.com/artist/carlos-junior-cabral-mn0000794043
- https://books.google.com/books?id=SA0EAAAAMBAJ&pg=PA20
- http://www.expocompositores.com/carlos-cabral-jr-panelista-confirmado-en-la-ponencia-productores-arquitectos-exitos/
- http://www.billboard.com/artist/278987/ana-b-rbara/biography
- http://www.allmusic.com/album/adentro-mw0000258567/credits
