= Lo Esencial de Ricardo Arjona =

Lo Esencial De Ricardo Arjona

Compilation album by Ricardo Arjona
- Released: 2010
- Recorded: 1985–2010
- Genre: Pop
- Label: Sony Music
- Producer: Ricardo Arjona

Ricardo Arjona chronology
Poquita Ropa (2010)	Lo Esencial De Ricardo Arjona (2010)	Independiente (2011)

Lo Esencial De Ricardo Arjona is a compilation album released on 2010 by Guatemalan singer-songwriter Ricardo Arjona.

The album is a compilation of 45 songs from Arjona's previous works.

Also, the album includes some of those hits recorded live, and new versions with artists like Puerto Rican pop singer Marc Anthony and salsa singer Gilberto Santa Rosa.

== Track listing ==
CD/DVD edition track list:

All tracks are written by Ricardo Arjona.

Disc 1
No.	Title	Length
1.	"Quién Diría"
2.	"Historia De Taxi"
3.	"Dime Que No"
4.	"Se Nos Muere El Amor"
5.	"Si Usted La Viera"
6.	"Así de Ilogico"
7.	"Hoy es Buen Día Para Empezar"
8.	"Ayudame Freud"
9.	"Me Enseñaste"
10.	"Pensar En Ti"
11.	"Animal Nocturno"
12.	"La Noche Te Trae Sorpresas"
13.	"Buenas Noches Don David"
14.	"Porque Hablamos" (feat. Ednita Nazario)
15.	"La Sucursal Del Cielo" (en vivo)

Disc 2
No.	Title	Length
1.	"Señora De Las Cuatro Décadas"
2.	"Primera Vez"
3.	"Tu Reputación"
4.	"Me Están Jodiendo La Vida"
5.	"Desnuda"
6.	"Como Olvidarte"
7.	"Casa de Locos"
8.	"Te Enamoraste de Ti"
9.	"Ella y El"
10.	"Libre"
11.	"Jesús verbo No Sustantivo"
12.	"Del Otro Lado del Sol"
13.	"Si El Norte Fuera El Sur"
14.	"Aquí Estoy" (en vivo)
15.	"Historia" (en vivo)

Disc 3
No.	Title	Length
1.	"Realmente No Estoy Tan Solo"
2.	"Cuando"
3.	"Olvidarte"
4.	"Te Conozco"
5.	"Tiempo En Una Botella"
6.	"Tarde (Sin Daños a Terceros)" (en vivo)
7.	"Mujeres"
8.	"Receta"
9.	"México"
10.	"Solo"
11.	"Noticiero"
12.	"Lo Poco Que Queda de Mi"
13.	"Historia de Taxi" (duet with Marc Anthony)
14.	"Desde La Calle 33" (en vivo)
15.	"Buenas Noches Don David" (duet with Gilberto Santa Rosa)

DVD
No.	Title	Length
1.	"Te Conozco"
2.	"Señora De Las Cuatro Décadas"
3.	"Historia De Taxi"
4.	"Realmente No Estoy Tan Solo"
5.	"Jesús Verbo No Sustantivo"
6.	"Mujeres"
7.	"Tu Reputación"
8.	"Desnuda"
9.	"Cuando"
10.	"Dime Que No"
11.	"Se Nos Muere El Amor"
12.	"Olvidarte"
13.	"Si El Norte Fuera Sur"
14.	"Buenas Noches Don David"
15.	"Te Enamoraste de Ti"
16.	"Aquí Estoy"
