= Jesús, Verbo No Sustantivo =

Studio album by Ricardo Arjona
- Released: 1988
- Genre: Pop
- Length: 40:01
- Label: Sony Music

Ricardo Arjona chronology
Déjame Decir Que Te Amo (1985)	Jesús, Verbo No Sustantivo (1988)	Del Otro Lado del Sol (1991)

Jesús, Verbo No Sustantivo is the second studio album released in 1988 by Guatemalan singer-songwriter Ricardo Arjona.

== Track listing ==
All tracks by Ricardo Arjona

1. "Jesús, verbo no sustantivo" (Jesus, Verb Not Noun) – 6:48
2. "Hermanos del tiempo" (Brothers Of Time) – 3:55
3. "Por qué es tan cruel el amor" (Why Is Love So Cruel) – 4:21
4. "Uno + uno = uno" (One + One = One) – 4:10
5. "S.O.S., rescátame" (S.O.S. Rescue Me) – 4:39
6. "Guerrero a su guerra" (Warrior to Its War) – 3:48
7. "Tú, mi amor" (You, My Love) – 3:29
8. "Fuego de juventud" (Youth Fire) – 3:08
9. "Cómo hacer a un lado el pasado" (How To Put The Past Aside) – 3:05
10. "Creo que se trata de amor" (I Think It's About Love) – 2:47

== Personnel ==
- Ricardo Arjona – vocals
