= Solo (Ricardo Arjona album) =

2004 compilation album by Ricardo Arjona

Greatest hits album by Ricardo Arjona
- Released: November 24, 2004
- Genre: Pop, rock
- Label: Sony Music Argentina

Ricardo Arjona chronology
Lados B (2003)	Solo (2004)	Adentro (2005)

Solo is a musical album released on November 24, 2004, by Guatemalan singer-songwriter Ricardo Arjona. It was nominated for Best Latin Pop Album at the 46th Annual Grammy Awards.

== Track listing ==
1. Te Conozco
2. Desnuda
3. Mujeres
4. Lo Poco Que Queda de Mí
5. Porque Es Tan Cruel El Amor
6. Tu Reputación
7. Asignatura Pendiente
8. Olvidarte
9. Soledad
10. Si El Norte Fuera El Sur
11. Realmente No Estoy Tan Solo
12. Señora de Las Cuatro Décadas
13. La Mujer Que No Soñé

== Chart performance ==
Chart (2004)	Peak position
US Top Latin Albums (Billboard)	5
US Latin Pop Albums (Billboard)	3
US Heatseekers Albums (Billboard)	4

== Sales and certifications ==
Region	Certification	Certified units/sales
Argentina (CAPIF)	Platinum	40,000^{^}
Mexico (AMPROFON)	Platinum	100,000^{^}
Mexico (AMPROFON) Video	Gold	10,000^{^}
^{^} Shipments figures based on certification alone.
