= Déjame Decir Que Te Amo =

Studio album by Ricardo Arjona
- Released: 1985
- Recorded: 1985
- Genre: Pop, rock
- Length: 37:08
- Label: Barca Discos; Dideca
- Producer: Ricardo Arjona

Ricardo Arjona chronology
Déjame Decir Que Te Amo (1985)	Jesús, Verbo No Sustantivo (1988)

Déjame Decir Que Te Amo is the debut album released in 1985 by Guatemalan singer-songwriter Ricardo Arjona.

== Reception ==
The Allmusic review awarded the album 3 stars.

Professional ratings
Review scores
Source	Rating
Allmusic	3/5 stars

== Track listing ==
All tracks by Ricardo Arjona except where noted

1. "Déjame decir que te amo" (Let Me Say I Love You) – 4:20
2. "Por amor" (For Love) – 3:44
3. "Monotonía" (Monotony) – 2:58
4. "Y ahora tú te me vas" (And Now You Go Away From Me) – 3:37
5. "No renunciaré" (I won't quit) (Luis Alva) - 4:15
6. "Vete con el sol" (Go With The Sun) – 4:22
7. "Romeo y Julieta" (Romeo And Juliet) – 3:48
8. "Hay amor" (There's Love) (Victor Manuel San José) – 3:45
9. "Se ha ido el amor" (Love Has Gone Away) – 4:13
10. "Ladrón" (Thief) – 2:12

== Personnel ==
- Ricardo Arjona – vocals
