= Minutos =

Single by Ricardo Arjona

from the album Santo Pecado
- Released: February 2003
- Recorded: 2001
- Genre: Latin pop
- Length: 4:08
- Label: Sony
- Songwriter: Miguel Luna
- Producers: Ricardo Arjona; Carlos Cabral Junior

Ricardo Arjona singles chronology
"El Problema" (2002)	"Minutos" (2003)	"Dame" (2003)

"Minutos" is a Latin pop song written by Guatemalan Latin pop singer-songwriter Ricardo Arjona for his ninth studio album, Santo Pecado (2002). The song was released as the second single from the album.

== Music video ==
The music video for "Minutos" was filmed in Argentina, on the Caseros prison, actually unused. It was filmed in two days, and in it, Arjona can be seen "playing basketball with the other recruits, doing exercise on an improvised gym, and thinking on the days he lived with his wife".

== Track listing ==
Digital download
No.	Title	Writer(s)	Length
1.	"Minutos"	Ricardo Arjona	4:08

== Charts ==
Chart (2003)	Peak position
US Hot Latin Songs (Billboard)	5
US Latin Pop Airplay (Billboard)	3

== Release history ==
Digital releases
Country	Date	Format	Label
Worldwide	February 2003	Contemporary hit radio	Sony
