= Lados B =

Compilation album by Ricardo Arjona
- Released: December 16, 2003
- Genre: Pop, rock
- Length: 60:54
- Label: Sony Discos
- Producer: Ricardo Arjona

Ricardo Arjona chronology
Santo Pecado (2002)	Lados B (2003)	Solo (2004)

Lados B (B Sides) is a compilation album released on December 16, 2003, by Guatemalan singer-songwriter Ricardo Arjona.

== Reception ==
Professional ratings
Review scores
Source	Rating
Allmusic	2/5 stars

The Allmusic review by Jason Birchmeier awarded the album 2 stars stating "This compilation is a misleading entry point into Arjona's catalog. Neophytes are better off starting with either the subsequently released greatest-hits compilations Quién Dijo Ayer (2007) and Simplemente lo Mejor (2008) or else Historias, which many fans consider to be Arjona's finest album, and then moving on to Si el Norte Fuera el Sur and Sin Daños a Terceros before going backward to Animal Nocturno."

== Track listing ==
All tracks by Ricardo Arjona

1. "Sólo Quería Un Café" (I Just Wanted A Coffee) – 3:51
2. "Tarde (Sin Daños a Terceros)" (Late (Without Harm to Thirds)) – 4:16
3. "Animal Nocturno" (Nocturnal Animal) – 3:54
4. "Aún Te Amo (Carta Nro. 1)" (I Still Love You (Letter No. 1)) – 3:33
5. "Ayúdame Freud" (Help Me Freud) – 6:42
6. "Del Otro Lado del Sol" (From The Other Side of The Sun) – 4:43
7. "Lo Poco Que Queda de Mí (Acoustic Version)" (What Little Is Left Of Me) – 4:34
8. "Receta (Acoustic Version)" (Prescription) – 4:53
9. "Duerme" (Sleep) – 5:04
10. "Vientre de Cuna" (Womb's a cradle) – 3:27
11. "Abarrotería de Amor" (Grocery Store of Love) – 3:41
12. "Pensar En Ti (Acoustic Version)" (Think of You) – 4:06
13. "Tú" (You) – 4:28
14. "A Cara o Cruz (Spanish Version)" (Head or Tails) – 3:42

== Personnel ==
- Roberto Arballo – arranger
- Ricardo Arjona – vocals, producer
- Joe Caldas – engineer
- Julio Chavez – recording assistant
- Mario DeJesús – engineer
- Isaias Garcia – engineer, mixing
- Sergio George – arranger, musical direction
- Gerardo Lopez – engineer
- Fernando Muscolo – arranger, keyboard programming
- Angel "Cucco" Peña – arranger, producer
- Gabriel Peña – production assistant
- Joe Pujals – arranger
- Héctor Ivan Rosa – engineer
- Humberto Soto – production assistant
- Miguel Angel "Matin" Villagran – arranger
- Sterling Winfield – recording assistant
- Ben Wisch – engineer

== Chart performance ==
Chart (2004)	Peak position
US Top Latin Albums (Billboard)	43

== Sales and certifications ==
Region	Certification	Certified units/sales
Mexico (AMPROFON)	Gold	75,000^{^}
^{^} Shipments figures based on certification alone.
