= Vivo (Ricardo Arjona album) =

Live album by Ricardo Arjona
- Released: October 5, 1999
- Recorded: December 5, 1998
- Genre: Pop, rock
- Label: Sony Discos

Ricardo Arjona chronology
| Sin Daños a Terceros (1998) | Vivo (1999) | Galería Caribe (2000) |

Vivo is the first live album, It was released on October 5, 1999, by Guatemalan singer-songwriter Ricardo Arjona.

== Track listing ==
1. Aquí Estoy
2. Ella y Él / Historia de Taxi
3. Quién Diría
4. Se Nos Muere el Amor
5. Realmente No Estoy Tan Solo
6. Si el Norte Fuera el Sur
7. Historia
8. Señora de las Cuatro Décadas
9. Desde la Calle 33
10. Tarde (Sin Daños a Terceros)
11. Me Enseñaste
12. Tu Reputación
13. Te Conozco
14. Dime Que No
15. Mujeres
16. Desnuda

== Chart performance ==
| Chart (1999) | Peak position |
|---|---|
| US Top Latin Albums (Billboard) | 6 |
| US Latin Pop Albums (Billboard) | 3 |
| US Heatseekers Albums (Billboard) | 20 |

== Sales and certifications ==
| Region | Certification | Certified units/sales |
|---|---|---|
| Argentina (CAPIF) | Platinum | 60,000^{^} |
| Mexico (AMPROFON) | 2× Gold | 150,000^{^} |
| United States (RIAA) | 2× Platinum (Latin) | 200,000^{^} |
^{^} Shipments figures based on certification alone.
