= Santo Pecado =

Studio album by Ricardo Arjona
- Released: November 19, 2002
- Recorded: 2001–2002
- Genre: Latin pop, Latin rock, pop rock, alternative rock
- Length: 64:42
- Label: Sony BMG Latin
- Producer: Ricardo Arjona; Carlos Cabral; Fernando Otero

Ricardo Arjona chronology
Galería Caribe (2000)	Santo Pecado (2002)	Lados B (2003)

Santo Pecado (English: Holy Sin) is the ninth studio album recorded by Guatemalan singer-songwriter Ricardo Arjona. It was released by Sony BMG Latin on November 19, 2002 (see 2002 in music) and was produced by Arjona, Carlos Cabral Jr. and Fernando Otero. The album earned nomination for Latin Grammy Award for Best Male Pop Vocal Album in the 4th Annual Latin Grammy Awards on September 3, 2003, losing by Quizás by Enrique Iglesias.

== Reception ==
The AllMusic review by Jason Birchmeier awarded the album 3.5 stars stating "Needless to say, Arjona's songwriting is masterful. Even if the musical style of a particular song isn't to one's liking, the lyrics are always a wonder to behold. ".

Professional ratings
Review scores
Source	Rating
AllMusic	3.5/5 stars

== Track listing ==
All tracks by Ricardo Arjona except where noted.

1. "El Problema" (The Problem) – 5:31
2. "Dame" (Give Me) – 3:46
3. "Quesos, Cosas, Casas" (Cheeses, Things, Houses) – 5:06
4. "Minutos" (Minutes) (Arjona, Miguel Luna) – 4:08
5. "Vivir Sin Ti Es Posible" (Living Without You Is Possible) – 4:31
6. "Santo Pecado" (Holy Sin) – 4:29
7. "Mujer de Lujo" (Woman of Luxury) – 3:54
8. "Señor Juez" (Mr. Judge) – 3:39
9. "Se Fué" (She Left) – 4:19
10. "La Nena (Bitácora de Un Secuestro)" (The Girl (Chronicle of A Kidnapping)) – 7:54
11. "Me Dejaste" (You Left Me) – 4:05
12. "No Sirve de Nada" (It's Useless) – 4:27
13. "Duele Verte" (Hurt Seeing You) – 4:42
14. "Amarte a Ti" (Loving You) – 4:11

== Personnel ==
Taken from the album's liner notes.

- Ricardo Arjona – vocals, arranger, producer
- Carlos Cabral Junior - co-producer, arranger, guitars, programming, keyboard
- Robert Adcock, Maurice Grants, Daniel Smith – cello
- Patricia Aiken, Mark Baranov, Kristin Fife, Armen Garabedian, Al Hershberger, Tiffiany Yi Hu, Johana Krejci, Dennis Molchan, Frances Moore, Irma Neumann, Julie Rogers, Lisa Sutton, Jacqueline Suzuki, Ericka Syroid, Francine Walsh, North Wood, Shari Zippert – violin
- James Atkinson, Kurt Snyder – French horn
- Kim Bullard – hammond organ
- Vinnie Colaiuta – drums
- Rose Corrigan – fagotes
- Héctor del Curto – bandoneon
- George Doering – autoharp, dulcimer, acoustic guitar, steel guitar, koto, mandoline, ukulele
- Assa Drori, Davis Young – string quartet
- Mike Englander – tympani
- Jerry Epstein – string quartet, viola
- Samuel Formicola, Lynn Grants, John Hayhurst, Renita Koven, Andrew Picken – viola
- Joel Hernández, Elizabeth Meza, David Torrens – backing vocals
- Dan Higgins – clarinet
- Michael Landau – electric guitar
- Armando Montiel, Rafael Padilla – percussion
- Jennifer Munday – string quartet, violin
- Barbara Northcutt – oboe
- Fernando Otero – arranger, conductor, keyboards, mini moog, hammond organ, piano, producer
- Víctor Patron – arranger, keyboards
- David Shostac – flute
- Neil Stubenhaus – bass
- Cecilia Tsan – cello, string quartet
- David Young – double bass

=== Technical ===
- Christina Abaroa – production coordination
- Will Quinnell, Julio Chávez – assistant
- Benny Faccone, Isaías García, Chris Gehringer, Ben Wish – engineer
- Jimmy Hoyson, Steve Robillard, Justin Smith, Sam Story – assistant engineer
- José Antonio Valencia – general coordination
- Ricardo Trabulsi – photography
- Evanna Fernández – product manager

== Chart performance ==
Chart (2002)	Peak position
US Top Latin Albums (Billboard)	3
US Latin Pop Albums (Billboard)	3
US Heatseekers Albums (Billboard)	5

== Sales and certifications ==
Region	Certification	Certified units/sales
Argentina (CAPIF)	4× Platinum	160,000^{^}
Mexico (AMPROFON)	2× Platinum	300,000^{^}
United States (RIAA)	2× Platinum (Latin)	200,000^{^}
^{^} Shipments figures based on certification alone.
