= Historias =

Studio album by Ricardo Arjona
- Released: April 19, 1994
- Recorded: 1993–94
- Genre: Latin pop; Latin rock; jazz
- Length: 63:28
- Label: Sony Discos
- Producer: Ricardo Arjona

Ricardo Arjona chronology
Animal Nocturno (1993)	Historias (1994)	Si El Norte Fuera El Sur (1996)

Historias is the fifth studio album by Guatemalan singer-songwriter Ricardo Arjona, released on April 19, 1994.

== Reception ==
The Allmusic review by Jason Birchmeier awarded the album 4.5 stars: "If you were to pick only one Arjona's album for your collection that wasn't a greatest-hits compilation, this should be the one"; he called the album a "career-defining success".

Professional ratings
Review scores
Source	Rating
Allmusic	4.5/5 stars

== Track listing ==
All tracks by Ricardo Arjona

1. "Si Yo Fuera" (If I Were) – 4:28
2. "Señora de las Cuatro Décadas" (Lady of The Four Decades) – 5:07
3. "Casa de Locos" (Crazy House) – 3:01
4. "Historia de Taxi" (Story of a Taxi Driver) – 6:45
5. "La Noche Te Trae Sorpresas" (The Night Brings You Surprises) – 4:10
6. "Amor de Tele" (Television Love) – 3:18
7. "Te Conozco" (I Know You) – 4:11
8. "Historia del Portero" (Story of a Doorman) – 5:12
9. "Realmente No Estoy Tan Solo" (I'm Really Not That Alone) – 3:51
10. "Del Otro Lado del Sol" (The Other Side Of The Sun) – 4:43
11. "Me Están Jodiendo la Vida" (They Are Ruining My Life) – 4:28
12. "Ayúdame Freud" (Help Me, Freud) – 6:43
13. "Libre" (Free) – 3:29
14. "Chicos de Plástico" (Plastic Boys) – 4:17

== Personnel ==
- Susan Ager, Melvin Baer, Norman Davidson, Andrzej Kapica, Diane Kitzman, Delmar Pettys, Mary Reynolds, Gloria Stroud, Peggy Zimmers – violin
- George Anderson – bass
- Mitta Angell, Kay Gardner, Barbara Hustis, Ellen Rose – viola
- Roberto Arballo – arranger, director, acoustic guitar, electric guitar, producer
- Pete Brewer – baritone sax
- Cheryl Cleavenger, Steve Haas, Debi Lee, Elizabeth Meza, Eric Tagg – backing vocals
- Tom Demer – viola, violin
- Mike Gage – drums
- Mike Gallagher – electric guitar
- Gene Glover – percussion
- Bud Guin – acoustic guitar
- Eugene Gwozoz – piano
- Ron Jones – soprano & tenor sax
- Randy Lee – clarinet
- Johnnie Marshall – hammond organ
- David Matthews – oboe
- Mimi McShane – cello
- John Meyers – cello
- Kim Platco – banjo
- Will Roberts – bassoon
- Jay Saunders – trumpet
- Chuck Schmidt – trumpet
- Miguel Angel "Malin" Villagran – arranger, acoustic guitar
- John Wasson – trombone

=== Technical personnel ===
- Tim Kimsey – engineer
- Carlos Somonte – photography
- Sterling Winfield – assistant engineer

== Chart performance ==
Chart (1994)	Peak position
Argentina (CAPIF)	3
Chile (APF)	1
U.S. Billboard Top Latin Albums	43

== Certifications and sales ==
Region	Certification	Certified units/sales
Argentina (CAPIF)	4× Platinum	350,000
Chile	—	125,000
Mexico (AMPROFON)	3× Platinum	400,000
United States (RIAA)	4× Platinum (Latin)	400,000^{^}
^{^} Shipments figures based on certification alone.

== See also ==
- 1994 in Latin music
- List of best-selling Latin albums
