= Si El Norte Fuera El Sur =

Studio album by Ricardo Arjona
- Released: August 20, 1996
- Recorded: 1996
- Genre: Pop, rock
- Length: 64:27
- Label: Sony Discos
- Producer: Ricardo Arjona

Ricardo Arjona chronology
| Historias (1994) | Si El Norte Fuera El Sur (1996) | Sin Daños a Terceros (1998) |

Si El Norte Fuera El Sur is the sixth studio album released on August 20, 1996, by Guatemalan singer-songwriter Ricardo Arjona.

== Reception ==
The Allmusic review by Jason Birchmeier awarded the album 4.5 stars stating "All in all, it's Arjona's third classic album in a row, each distinct from its predecessor.".

Professional ratings
Review scores
| Source | Rating |
|---|---|
| Allmusic | 4.5/5 stars |

== Track listing ==
All tracks by Ricardo Arjona

1. "Noticiero" (News Report) – 5:29
2. "Tu Reputación" (Your Reputation) – 4:48
3. "Ella y Él" (She And He) – 6:15
4. "Se Nos Muere el Amor" (The Love is Dying on Us) – 4:07
5. "Si el Norte Fuera el Sur" (If The North Was The South) – 4:55
6. "Aún Te Amo (Carta No. 1)" (I Still Love You (Letter No.1)) – 3:33
7. "Abarrotería de Amor" (Grocery Store of Love) – 3:41
8. "Duerme" (Sleep) – 5:03
9. "Te Acuerdas de Mí (Carta No. 2, 20 Años Después)" (Do You Remember Me (Letter No. 2, 20 Years Later) – 4:17
10. "Cita en el Bar" (Date at The Bar) – 4:23
11. "Me Enseñaste" (You Taught Me) – 4:43
12. "Frente al Televisor" (In Front of The T.V.) – 4:28
13. "Tú" (You) – 4:28
14. "México" – 4:27

== Personnel ==
- Patricia Aiken, Ronald Folsom, Yi Hu, Brian Leonard, Dennis Motchan, Bob Sanov, Francine Walsh, Elizabeth Wilson, Jennifer Woodward, Shari Zippert – violin
- Ricardo Arjona – vocals, arranger, director, producer
- Phyllis Bailey, Francis Benítez, Gustavo, Patricia Hodges, Leyla Hoyle, Carlos Murguía, Kenny OBrian, Jesof Powel, Stephanie Spruitt – backing vocals
- Robbie Buchanan, Otmaro Ruíz – Piano
- Luis Conte – Percussion
- George Doering – acoustic guitar
- Assa Drori, Don Hahn – orchestration
- Laura Dvennen, Matt Funes, Andrew Picken, Kazi Pitelka – viola
- Pedro Eustache – flute
- Dennis Farias, Ramon Flores – trumpet
- Stefanie Fife, Roger Labow, Michael Mathews, Daniel Smith, Cecilia Tsan – cello
- Dan Higgins – clarinet, saxophone
- Abraham Laboriel, Sr. – bass
- Michael Landau – electric guitar
- Billy Preston – organ
- John "J.R." Robinson – drums
- David Stout – trombone
- Miguel Angel "Matin" Villagran – arranger, acoustic guitar

=== Technical personnel ===
- Christina Abaroa – production coordination
- Bill – assistant engineer, mixing assistant
- Benny Faccone – engineer, mixing
- Bernie Grundman – mastering
- Rocio Larrazolo – art direction
- Leonardo Leos – wardrobe, make-up
- Mike Palm – assistant engineer
- Ricardo Trabulsi – Photography
- Rodolfo Vazquez – Engineer

== Chart performance ==
| Chart (1996–1997) | Peak position |
|---|---|
| US Top Latin Albums (Billboard) | 21 |
| US Latin Pop Albums (Billboard) | 12 |

== Sales and certifications ==
| Region | Certification | Certified units/sales |
|---|---|---|
| Argentina (CAPIF) | 3× Platinum | 180,000^{^} |
| United States (RIAA) | 2× Platinum (Latin) | 200,000^{^} |
^{^} Shipments figures based on certification alone.
