= Animal Nocturno =

- Frontal album cover

Studio album by Ricardo Arjona
- Released: February 9, 1993
- Recorded: 1992
- Genre: Pop, rock
- Length: 47:18
- Label: Sony Music, Epic
- Producer: Ricardo Arjona

Ricardo Arjona chronology
Del Otro Lado del Sol (1991)	Animal Nocturno (1993)	Historias (1994)

Animal Nocturno is the fourth studio album released by Guatemalan singer-songwriter Ricardo Arjona on February 9, 1993.

== Reception ==
AllMusic reviewer Jason Birchmeier awarded the album 4 stars stating "The lyrics of Animal Nocturno are rebellious and bohemian in a way that Arjona's later work isn't. The fame and accolades that followed the release of this album changed him in several ways. In the wake of Animal Nocturno, he grew increasingly sophisticated from both a lyrical and musical standpoint, and he steadily lost the everyman perspective that informs many of these songs. Fans of Arjona's latter-day work who dig this deep into his back catalog should find this album fascinating."

Professional ratings
Review scores
Source	Rating
AllMusic	4/5 stars

== Track listing ==
All tracks by Ricardo Arjona except where noted.

1. "Libre" (Free) – 3:35
2. "Primera Vez" (First Time) – 3:46.
3. "Mujeres" (Women) – 3:28.
4. "Tiempo en una Botella" ("Time in a Bottle") (Jim Croce) – 2:29.
5. "Cómo Olvidarte" (How to Forget You) – 3:43
6. "Solo" (Alone) (Arjona, Tony Jaffe, Joey Levine, David Spinozza) – 3:45.
7. "Baila Conmigo" (Dance with Me) – 3:47.
8. "Quién Diría" (Who Would Say) – 3:53.
9. "Te Encontraré" (I'll Find You) – 4:28.
10. "Así de Ilógico" (As Illogical as) – 3:59.
11. "Animal Nocturno" (Nocturnal Animal) (Arjona, Jose Roberto Martinez) – 3:53.
12. "Jesús, Verbo No Sustantivo" (Jesus, a verb, not a noun) – 6:48. (As a bonus track)

== Chart performance ==
Chart (1993)	Peak position
US Latin Pop Albums (Billboard)	11

== Sales and certifications ==
Region	Certification	Certified units/sales
Argentina (CAPIF)	Platinum	60,000^{^}
Chile	—	94,000
Mexico (AMPROFON)	2× Platinum	500,000
United States (RIAA)	2× Platinum (Latin)	200,000^{^}
^{^} Shipments figures based on certification alone.
