= Sin Daños a Terceros =

Studio album by Ricardo Arjona
- Released: June 2, 1998
- Recorded: 1997–98
- Genre: Pop, rock
- Length: 61:59
- Label: Sony Discos
- Producer: Ricardo Arjona

Ricardo Arjona chronology
Si El Norte Fuera El Sur (1996)	Sin Daños a Terceros (1998)	Vivo (1999)

Sin Daños a Terceros is the seventh studio album released on June 2, 1998, by Guatemalan singer-songwriter Ricardo Arjona.

== Reception ==
The AllMusic review by Terry Jenkins awarded the album 4 stars stating "Sin Daños a Terceros continues Ricardo Arjona's streak of accomplished, affecting albums that spotlights both his melodic skills and his sharp social consciousness.".

Professional ratings
Review scores
Source	Rating
AllMusic	4/5 stars

== Track listing ==
All tracks by Ricardo Arjona except where noted.

1. "Te Guste o No" (Like it or not) – 3:36
2. "Mentiroso" (Liar) – 3:59
3. "Olvidarte" (Forget You) – 5:31
4. "Desnuda" (Naked) – 4:15
5. "Loco" (Crazy) – 4:11
6. "Dime Que No" (Tell Me No) – 4:25
7. "Buenas Noches, Don David" (Good Evening, Mr. David) – 4:58
8. "No Estoy Solo" (I'm Not Alone) – 3:55
9. "Vientre de Cuna" (Womb’s a Cradle) – 3:29
10. "Hoy Es un Buen Día para Empezar" (Today Is a Good Day to Start) – 5:18
11. "Millonario de Luz" (Millionaire of Light) – 5:04
12. "Con una Estrella" (With a Star) – 4:15
13. "A Siete Metros" (Seven Meters Away) – 5:04
14. "Tarde (Sin Daños a Terceros)" (Late (No Harm to Third Parties)) – 4:17

== Personnel ==
=== Musicians ===
- Ricardo Arjona – vocals, producer
- Fernando Acosta – soprano sax
- Patricia Aiken, Armen Anassian, Brian Benning, Rebecca Bunnell, Andrea Byers, Assa Drori, Tiffany Hu, Igor Kiskatchi, Dennis Molchan, Robert Sanov, Elizabeth Wilson, Shari Zippert – violin
- Vage Ayrikyan, Larry Corbett, Maurice Grants, Cecilia Tsan – cello
- Charles Bolto – clarinet
- Rodrigo Cárdenas – bass, acoustic guitar
- Jon Clarke – English horn, Oboe
- Lynn Grants, Andrew Picken, Kazi Pitelka, Karie Prescott – viola
- Larry Hall – trumpet
- Dan Higgins – alto sax
- Patricia Hodges, Leyla Hoyle, Kurt Lykes, Carlos Murguía, Stephanie Spruill, Tony Wilkins – backing vocals
- Michael Landau – acoustic guitar, electric guitar
- Frances Liu Wu – double bass
- Waldo Madera – arranger, drums
- Joseph Mayer – French horn
- Elizabeth Meza – vocals
- Armando Montiel – percussion
- Fernando Otero – arranger, keyboards, piano
- Bruce Otto – trombone
- Heitor Teixeira Pereira – acoustic guitar
- David Riddles – bassoon
- Felipe Souza – electric guitar
- Sheridon Stokes – flute
- David R. Stone – double bass
- Jerry Williams – timbales

=== Technical ===
- Christina Abaroa – production coordination
- Ricardo Arjona – arranger, producer
- Chris Bellman, Benny Faccone – mastering
- Alberto Carballo Cabiedes – graphic design
- Sergio Casillas – photo assistance
- Mauricio Garcia – assistant producer
- Alejandra Gutierrez – production coordination
- Don Hahn – orchestra contractor
- Edward M. Karen – general director
- John Karpowich – engineer
- Benny Faccone – engineer, mixing
- Luis Pinzón – assistant engineer
- Alan Sanderson – assistant engineer
- Joanna Schatz – make-up
- Alicia Vivanco Sodi – art direction
- Ricardo Trabulsi – photography
- José Antonio Valencia – production coordination

== Chart performance ==
Chart (1998)	Peak position
US Top Latin Albums (Billboard)	6
US Latin Pop Albums (Billboard)	3
US Heatseekers Albums (Billboard)	26

== Sales and certifications ==
Region	Certification	Certified units/sales
Argentina (CAPIF)	3× Platinum	180,000^{^}
United States (RIAA)	2× Platinum (Latin)	200,000^{^}
Uruguay (CUD)	Platinum	6,000^{^}
^{^} Shipments figures based on certification alone.
