= Galería Caribe =

Studio album by Ricardo Arjona
- Released: August 29, 2000
- Recorded: 1999–2000
- Studios: Altamar Music Studios (San Juan, Puerto Rico); Acurero Studios (Caracas, Venezuela); One Way Recording Studio (Los Angeles, California); Sono Dos Mil Estudios; Sony Music Studios (Mexico City, Mexico); South Beach Studios (Miami Beach, Florida); The War Room; War House (Newark, New Jersey)
- Genre: Latin pop
- Length: 77:13
- Label: Sony Music México
- Producer: Ricardo Arjona

Ricardo Arjona chronology
Vivo (1999)	Galería Caribe (2000)	Santo Pecado (2002)

Galería Caribe (English: Caribbean Gallery) is the eighth studio album recorded by Guatemalan singer-songwriter Ricardo Arjona, It was released by Sony Music México on August 29, 2000 (see 2000 in music). and became his first number-one album in the Billboard Top Latin Albums chart, peaking at the top of the chart in 2000 and 2001.

== Reception ==
Professional ratings
Review scores
Source	Rating
Allmusic	3/5 stars

The Allmusic review by Jason Birchmeier awarded the album 3 stars stating "All in all, Galería Caribe is a curious entry in Arjona's catalog that most fans can overlook without missing much."

== Track listing ==
All songs were written by Ricardo Arjona, except where noted.

1. "Carabelas" (Caravels) – 2:32
2. "Mujer de Guanahani" (Woman From Guanahani) (Arjona, Angel "Cuco" Peña) – 3:42
3. "Lo Poco Que Queda de Mi" (What Little is Left Of Me) – 4:56
4. "Un Caribe en Nueva York" (A Caribbean in New York) – 5:24
5. "Cuando" (When) – 4:34
6. "Receta" (Prescription) – 4:52
7. "Sólo Quería un Café" (I Just Wanted A Coffee) – 3:50
8. "Mesias" (Messiah) – 4:41
9. "Te Enamoraste de Ti" (You Fell in Love With You) – 4:27
10. "Lo Poco Que Queda de Mi (Acoustic)" – 4:34
11. "Si Usted la Viera (El Confesor)" (If You See Her (The Confessor)) (Eusebio Blasco, Jorge Luis Chacín) – 4:18
12. "Receta (Acoustic)" – 4:23
13. "Pensar en Ti" (Think of You) – 4:22
14. "Pensar en Ti (Acoustic)" – 4:03
15. "Cuando (Pop version)" – 4:19
16. "Te Enamoraste de Ti (Acoustic)" – 4:09
17. "Sólo Quería un Café (Acoustic)" – 3:26
18. "Porque Hablamos (featuring Ednita Nazario)" (Because We Talk) – 4:41
19. "A Cara O Cruz" (Face Or Cross) – 3:42 (Spain Bonus Track)

== Personnel ==
- Ricardo Arjona – vocals
- Cucco Peña – Arreglos Direccion
- Fernando Muscolo – Arreglos Piano Teclados
- Joe Caldas - Ing. de Grabación y Mezcla

== Singles ==
1. Cuando
2. Lo Poco Que Queda de Mi
3. Mesias
4. A Cara O Cruz
5. Porque Hablamos (featuring Ednita Nazario) (Spain only)

== Chart performance ==
Chart (2000–2001)	Peak position
US Billboard Top Latin Albums	1
US Billboard Latin Pop Albums	1
US Billboard Heatseekers Albums	6
US Billboard 200	136

== Sales and certifications ==
Region	Certification	Certified units/sales
Argentina (CAPIF)	Platinum	60,000^{^}
Mexico (AMPROFON)	Platinum	150,000^{^}
United States (RIAA)	2× Platinum (Latin)	200,000^{^}
^{^} Shipments figures based on certification alone.
