= Desnuda (Ricardo Arjona song) =

Single by Ricardo Arjona

from the album Sin Daños a Terceros
- Released: 1999
- Genre: Latin pop
- Length: 4:14
- Label: Sony Discos
- Songwriter: Ricardo Arjona
- Producer: Ricardo Arjona

Ricardo Arjona singles chronology
"Olvidarte" (1999)	"Desnuda" (1999)	"Historias" (2000)

Music video
- "Desnuda" on YouTube

"Desnuda" (English: "Naked") is a song written and performed by Guatemalan singer-songwriter Ricardo Arjona for his seventh studio album, Sin Daños a Terceros (1998). It was released as a single in 1999. It became his first number-one song on both the Billboard Hot Latin Songs and Latin Pop Airplay charts in the United States. It spent 12 weeks at number one on the latter chart, tying with his other song "El Problema". The song would later become the theme song for the Mexican telenovela Tres mujeres (1999). It was recognized as one of the best-performing Latin pop songs of 2000 by ASCAP. Mario Tarradell of the Dallas Morning Morning News described it as one of the album's "eclectic, provocative cuts". "Desnuda" was nominated in the category of Pop Song of the Year at the Premio Lo Nuestro 2000, but lost to "Livin' la Vida Loca" by Ricky Martin. In 2007, Arjona revealed the origins of the song. The music video was directed by Benny Corral. Although a friend of Arjona, Costa Rican model Vica Andrade declined to appear on the music video.

== Charts ==
=== Weekly charts ===
Chart (2000)	Peak position
US Hot Latin Songs (Billboard)	1
US Latin Pop Airplay (Billboard)	1

=== Yearly charts ===
Chart (2000)	Position
US Hot Latin Songs (Billboard)	10
US Latin Pop Airplay (Billboard)	3

=== Decade-End charts ===
Chart (2000–2009)	Peak position
US Latin Pop Airplay (Billboard)	35

== See also ==
- Billboard Hot Latin Songs Year-End Chart
- List of number-one Billboard Hot Latin Tracks of 2000
- List of Billboard Latin Pop Airplay number ones of 2000
