= Ricardo Arjona =

Guatemalan singer (born 1964)

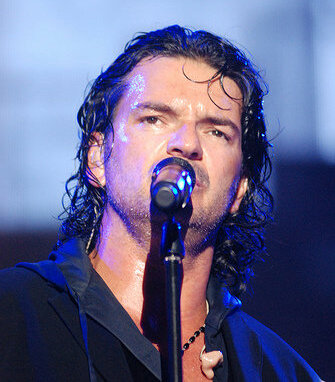
- Arjona in 2009

Background information
- Born: Edgar Ricardo Arjona Morales; 19 January 1964 (age 62); Jocotenango, Guatemala
- Genres: Latin pop; Latin ballad; folk; a capella
- Occupations: Singer; songwriter
- Years active: 1985–present
- Labels: PolyGram (1985–1989); Sony Music (1991–2008); Warner Latina (2008–2011); Metamorfosis (2011–present)
- Website: ricardoarjona.com

Edgar Ricardo Arjona Morales (born 19 January 1964), known as Ricardo Arjona (Spanish pronunciation: [riˈkaɾðo aɾˈxona]), is a Guatemalan singer and songwriter. He is one of the most successful and best-selling Latin American artists of all time, with more than 20 million records sold. His music ranges from ballads to Latin pop, rock, pop rock, Cuban music, and more recently a cappella performances and a mixture of Tejano music and Nor2eño music, and Latin sounds. Arjona is noted for his lyrical style, and often addresses topics such as love, sexuality, violence, racism and immigration.

As of 2026, Arjona had released eighteen studio albums, four live albums, twenty compilation albums and sixty-two singles. Nine Arjona albums reached number one on the Billboard Top Latin Albums, and in Argentina. Eight albums had charted on the Billboard 200. Four singles had reached number one on the Billboard Latin Songs chart and seven had done the same on Latin Pop Songs. His work earned him numerous awards and accolades, including one Grammy Award, one Latin Grammy Award, the Latin Heritage Award as well as awards from the American Society of Composers, Authors and Publishers; a silver and golden torch and two silver seagulls from the 2010 Viña del Mar International Song Festival, two Billboard Latin Music Awards, and a "Latin Trajectory of the Year" Award at the Orgullosamente Latino Awards of 2010.

== Early life ==
Edgar Ricardo Arjona Morales was born on 19 January 1964, in Jocotenango, Guatemala, to parents Ricardo Arjona Moscoso and Mimi Morales de Arjona. He spent most of his childhood in Guatemala City, where he began his musical instruction. At age twelve, he participated in the contest "Festival Infantil Juventud 74" with "Gracias al Mundo", a song composed by his father, finally winning the event. Although he initially enrolled in architecture and engineering at the Universidad de San Carlos de Guatemala (USAC), he graduated with a degree from the School of Communication Sciences.

== Sports career ==
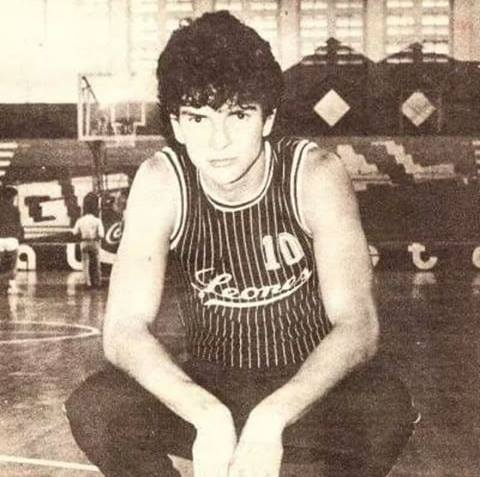

Arjona was a talented basketball player who played for Leones de Marte and TRIAS. He toured Central America as a member of the Guatemala national basketball team. Until 2005, he held the record for the most points scored (79) in a single game by a Guatemalan. He also taught at a primary school (called Santa Elena III), where he claimed to have spent six hours giving lessons and the rest of the day playing football. This earned him a visit from a Ministry of Education representative, who was sent to evaluate his pupils. The representative found that the students' education was actually above average. In 1988, he became the basketball coach of a boys' school (called Instituto Don Bosco).

== Music career ==
=== 1980s: Beginnings and early success ===
Arjona began his musical career at age 21, when he signed with the now defunct Guatemalan record label, Discos de Centroamérica, S.A., and distributed by PolyGram, and released his debut album Déjame Decir Que Te Amo in 1985. The label attempted to portray Arjona as a stereotypical Latin lover. The title track was released as a single, "Déjame Decir Que Te Amo". This album failed to chart, but received moderate praise from critics, with Allmusic awarding it three stars out of five. Because of his negative experience recording the album and its commercial failure, he decided to abandon music to teach school. At age 24, Arjona reversed course and sought the opportunity to represent Guatemala in the OTI Festival 1988 with the song "Con una estrella en el vientre". The sessions immediately following this decision produced the song "S.O.S Rescátame". His second studio album, Jesús, Verbo No Sustantivo, brought him commercial and critical success across Latin America and the U.S. and became a best-seller in many Central American territories.

=== 1990s: International breakthrough, Si El Norte Fuera El Sur and Sin Daños a Terceros ===
Arjona started the new decade as a regular in the Mexican telenovela (soap opera) "Alcanzar una Estrella" (English translation: Reaching a Star), which assisted him in becoming a known singer throughout Latin America. After joining Sony Music in 1990, he released Del Otro Lado del Sol, one of his least successful albums. That year, he started composing songs for other artists, such as Yuri's "Detrás de Mi Ventana", for her album Nueva era (1993). The song became a hit, reaching No.1 on the US Hot Latin Songs chart for three weeks in 1994. He later covered the song in his compilation album, Trópico (2009), alongside Melina León. Animal Nocturno, Arjona's fourth studio album, was released in 1993. The album contained the hit singles "Mujeres" (No. 6 on Latin Songs) and "Primera Vez" (No. 6 on Latin Songs) and received thirteen platinum and one diamond certifications. Animal Nocturno sold 500,000 copies in 1994, and carried Arjona to fame along with his work on the Mexican telenovela Alcanzar Una Estrella, which allowed him to showcase his songwriting and singing skills.

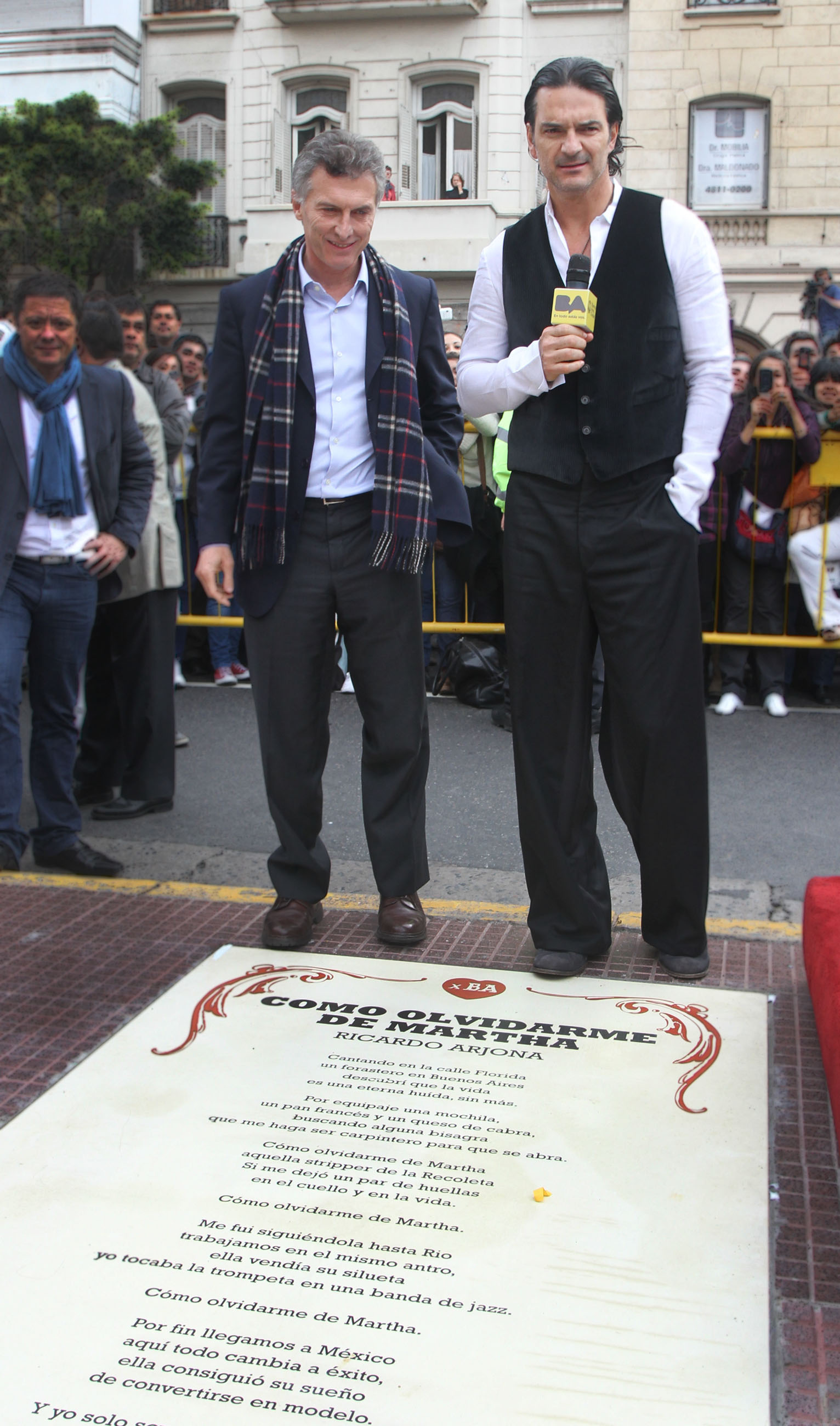
Ricardo Arjona honoured in 2012 by former president of Argentina and then-Buenos Aires city mayor, Mauricio Macri.

He confirmed his reputation with the release of his fifth studio album, Historias. The album sold 2 million copies throughout Latin America and received twenty-seven platinum and two diamond certifications, including quadruple Platinum in Argentina. Historias reached No. 43 on Top Latin Albums and included the hit singles "Te Conozco" (No. 3 on Billboard Latin Songs) and "Señora De Las Cuatro Décadas" (No. 7 on Latin Songs). The Allmusic review by Jason Birchmeier awarded the album 4.5 stars, stating: "If you were to pick only one Arjona album for your collection that wasn't a greatest-hits compilation, this should be the one. Historias was a career-defining success for Arjona." His fourth and fifth studio albums were the best-selling of his career.

In 1996, he released his sixth studio album, Si El Norte Fuera El Sur. This was the first album in which Arjona ventured beyond the theme of love to explore nationalism and globalization, among other sociopolitical topics. Its four singles were "Si El Norte Fuera El Sur" (No. 9 on Latin Pop Songs), whose main theme is the relationship between the United States and Latin America, "Tu Reputación" (No. 18 on Latin Songs, No. 2 on Latin Pop Songs), "Me Enseñaste" (No. 18 on Latin Pop Songs), and "Ella y Él" (No. 24 on Latin Songs, No. 8 on Latin Pop Songs). Birchmeier awarded the album 4.5 stars stating "All in all, it's Arjona's third classic album in a row, each distinct from its predecessor." Billboard named it the Rock Album of the Year in 1997. Si El Norte Fuera El Sur received multiple Platinum certifications in the United States and Argentina.

In 1998, he released his seventh studio album, Sin Daños a Terceros. Terry Jenkins from Allmusic, on his review of the album, awarded it 4 stars, writing that "Sin Daños a Terceros continues Ricardo Arjona's streak of accomplished, affecting albums that spotlights both his melodic skills and his sharp social consciousness." His fourth consecutive album to receive critical success, Sin Daños a Terceros also enjoyed commercial success, debuting at No. 6 on Top Latin Albums, the first to reach the top 10, and reaching No. 3 on the Billboard Latin Pop Albums chart. It contained the hit singles "Dime Que No" (No. 6 on Latin Songs, No. 3 on Latin Pop Songs), and "Mentiroso" (No. 22 on Latin Songs, No. 5 on Latin Pop Songs). The album received multiple Platinum certifications from the United States and Argentina. More than 700,000 copies were sold.

On 5 December 1998 and in front of a live audience of more than 100,000 people at the Hippodrome of Guatemala City, Arjona recorded his first live album, the 1999 release Vivo. The album was moderately successful, certified Gold in Mexico and Platinum in the United States and Argentina. It produced the hit "Desnuda", which became his first No. 1 on the Billboard Top Latin Songs chart. As of December 2005, Vivo had sold 243,000 copies in the United States, his best-selling album there as of that date.

=== 2000–2005: Galería Caribe, world tour, Santo Pecado, hiatus and Adentro ===
Arjona's eighth studio album, Galería Caribe was preceded by the single "Cuándo", which became a commercial success and reached No. 1 on both Top Latin Songs and Latin Pop Songs. The singer commented that the album consumed twelve months and that before starting, he "had more friends." He also mentioned he had "lived in love with Caribbean culture and music since my childhood." Birchmeier awarded the album 3 stars stating "All in all, Galería Caribe is a curious entry in Arjona's catalog that most fans can overlook without missing much." The album became his first to chart on the Billboard 200, peaking at No. 136, while charting at No. 1 on Top Latin Albums and Latin Pop Albums. It was awarded Platinum certification in Mexico, Argentina and the US. Its three singles were "Lo Poco Que Queda De Mi"; "Mesías", which reached No. 19 on Top Latin Songs and No. 11 on the Latin Pop Songs chart, and "A Cara O Cruz", which reached No. 28 on Latin Pop Songs. To promote the album, which sold more than one million copies, Arjona embarked on his Galería Caribe Tour, which began in Mexico in 2000 and finished in 2001.

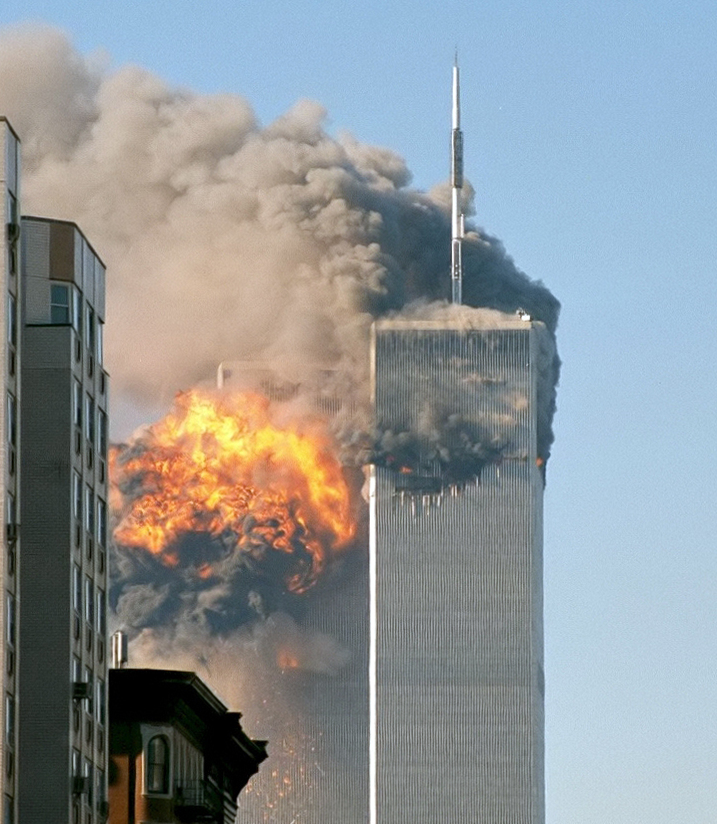
Fans and critics noted connections between the lyrics of "Mesías" and the September 11 attacks on the World Trade Center, resulting in an FBI investigation.

"Mesías"
A sample of "Mesías", displaying the first chorus of the controversial song, investigated by the FBI.

In "Mesias" Arjona talks about a character who appears "in the form of a wealthy, well-armed magnate with [...] some sinister plan for the world." Some critics argued that it was a "metaphorical attack" on capitalism and imperialism, named as "classic Arjona targets." The song became a subject of some controversy when fans and critics noted connections between its theme and the attacks of September 2001, months after the song's release, which resulted in the FBI investigating Arjona. The singer later commented that "Mesías" had no relationship to the attacks, and that the lyrics were pure coincidence. He further stated the FBI had never spoken directly to him, but instead to somebody on his team.

On 19 November 2002, Arjona released his ninth studio album, Santo Pecado, preceded by singles "El Problema", which reached No. 1 on both the Billboard Top Latin Songs and Latin Pop Songs charts, and "Minutos", which reached No. 5 on the Top Latin Songs and No. 3 on the Latin Pop Songs charts. Santo Pecado became a commercial success, selling more than 300,000 copies just in Mexico (double Platinum), 160,000 in Argentina (quadruple Platinum) and 200,000 in the United States (double Platinum). In 2003 Arjona released Lados B, his second compilation album, including songs that were "not so commercial", and that he wanted to give a second chance at radio airplay. The album contained songs from all his past studio albums. Critical reception for the album was mixed. Birchmeier noted that it was "a misleading entry point into Arjona's catalog." Despite this, the album received a Gold certification in Mexico.

On 6 December 2005, Arjona released his tenth studio album, Adentro. This was Arjona's first collaboration with Tommy Torres. In an interview, the singer commented that he first "tested" Torres by sending him the "hookiest and darkest tracks" on the album, "Acompañame A Estar Solo" and "Iluso". Torres said that he "went all out on the first demo, hiring a full band that included a string orchestra", which grabbed Arjona's attention. The album was critically acclaimed, with Evan C. Gutiérrez from Allmusic giving it four stars out of five and commenting that "Be it for the stripped, natural production value, the confident performance of Ricardo Arjona, or his relevant-as-ever lyricism, he's got both his loyal fans and the execs at Norte smiling. While the instrumentation, performance, and overall sonic palette of this project are minimalist and unassuming, there is a depth and brilliance to them. The listener's ear does not tire or want for more, humble as Adentro is." Arjona further commented that Adentro was "a very representative and tremendously complete album," adding that "having different producers made it rich in possibilities."

Adentro became Arjona's second studio album to chart on the Billboard 200, reaching No. 126. It reached No. 3 on the Top Latin Albums and No. 2 on the Latin Pop Albums charts. Five singles were released from Adentro: the lead single, "Acompañame A Estar Solo" (No. 7 on Latin Songs, No. 1 on Latin Pop Songs), "Pingüinos En La Cama" featuring Spanish singer Chenoa (No. 44 on Latin Songs, No. 19 on Latin Pop Songs); "Mojado", featuring American Tejano/Norteño band Intocable (No. 34 on Latin Songs, No. 30 on Latin Pop Songs), "A Ti" (No. 14 on Latin Songs, No. 3 on Latin Pop Songs), and "De Vez En Mes" (No. 49 on Latin Songs, No. 16 on Latin Pop Songs). The album sold more than a million copies worldwide.

=== 2006–2007: Adentro Tour and Quién Dijo Ayer ===
In 2006, Arjona started the first leg of his world tour, named the Adentro Tour. The tour resumed in 2007 for a second leg, in which he visited more countries. Approximately two million people attended the performances. The tour was officially closed on 14 September 2007 on the mainland city of Barquisimeto, Venezuela, during the International Fair, in front of more than 100,000 people. On 21 August 2007, Arjona released his fifth compilation album, Quién Dijo Ayer. The album is a two-disc set which contains, on the first disc, new versions of past hits, some of them including featured artists such as Marta Sánchez on "Tarde (Sin Daños a Terceros)" from Sin Daños a Terceros; Panteón Rococó on "Si El Norte Fuera el Sur", from the album of the same name; Marc Anthony on "Historia de Taxi", from Historias; Eros Ramazzotti on "A Ti", from Adentro, and Sandro on "Realmente No Estoy Tan Solo", from Historias, and which was the last song recorded by the singer, who died on 4 January 2010. Arjona's manager told Argentinian newspaper Clarín that "[the singer] had the idea of inviting Roberto [Sandro] for his album, he [Sandro] showed enthusiasm and manifested the same degree of appreciation to Arjona. It seemed to him that he [Arjona] was an artist who proclaims the same values he proclaimed." The second disc contained remastered versions of the hits on the first disc, but in their original versions. It was the second time Arjona collaborated with Torres.

The album became a critical and commercial success. Jason Birchmeier commented that "while only a couple of the new versions depart stylistically from the originals, the contemporary productions breathe new life into these songs, which should be well known by longtime fans", and reaching double Platinum in Argentina and the United States, and Platinum in Mexico. The record was additionally certified Gold in Colombia, Chile and Venezuela. Two singles were released from the album. The first, "Quién", a previously unreleased song produced by Torres, failed to reach the top 20 on Latin Songs, standing at No. 21, but reached No. 4 on the Latin Pop Songs chart. Arjona commented that "'Quién' is a story with the hurry of the desperate, is the flashback of those who end up loving alone." "Quiero", the second single, reached No.12 on the Latin Songs chart, and No.8 on the Latin Pop Songs chart.

=== 2008–2010: New label, Quinto Piso, world tour and Poquita Ropa ===
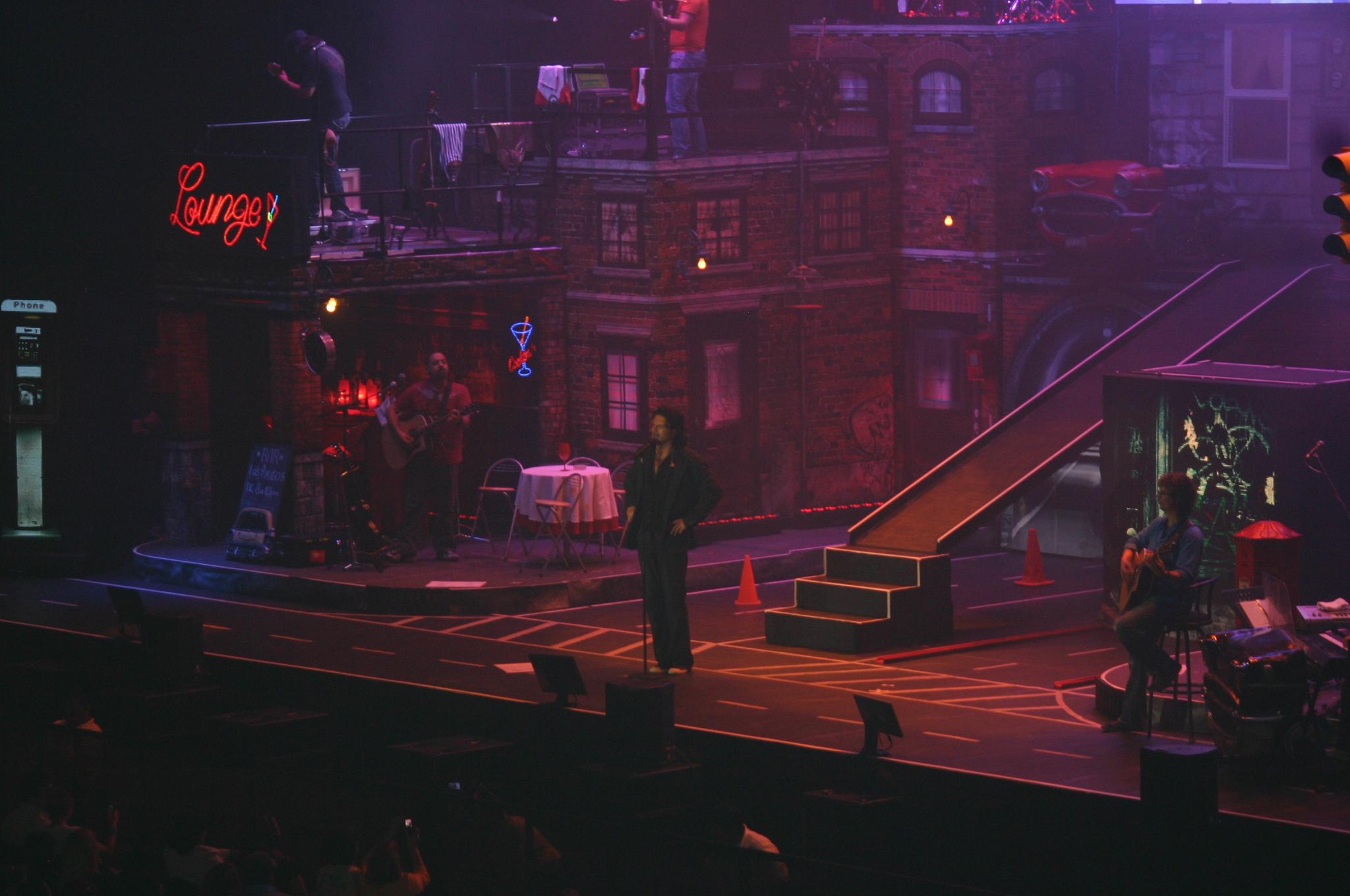
Ricardo Arjona in Laredo, Texas, during Quinto Piso Tour.

After spending the majority of his career with Sony, and Sony BMG, Arjona signed a long-term deal with Warner Music Latina in September 2008. Iñigo Zabala, chairman of Warner Music Latin America, said "He's an artist that fits perfectly with our company," and that "We are a label that has a major catalog of songwriters and quality pop and rock from the likes of Maná, Alejandro Sanz, Laura Pausini, and now, Arjona." Arjona announced his eleventh studio album, 5to Piso, on 18 November 2008. The album was preceded by the first single, "Cómo Duele" on September, which reached No. 2 on Top Latin Songs and No. 1 on Latin Pop Songs. He moved approximately 200,000 copies of the album in the first month at retail, and it went Platinum in Mexico, the United States, Spain, Argentina, Venezuela, Colombia, Guatemala, and several other countries. It debuted at No. 1 on Top Latin Albums, becoming his second chart-topper on that list, and sold more than one million copies worldwide. The album received a Grammy Award nomination for Best Latin Pop Album and a Latin Grammy Award nomination for Best Singer-Songwriter Album. The album received positive critical response. Birchmeier gave it three-and-a-half stars out of five, saying that "More typical than exceptional for Arjona at this point in his career, 5to Piso isn't as grand an album as his past few... Yet it's a great album all the same, particularly the opening run of songs that culminates with 'Cómo Duele', and it finds Arjona still at the top of his craft."

While Warner Music released his new studio album, Sony Music released a compilation album, Simplemente Lo Mejor. This led to speculation that the labels were in a fight to win Arjona's fanbase and sales. Simplemente Lo Mejor contained hits from past albums, namely Sin Daños a Terceros, Si El Norte Fuera El Sur, among others. This compilation went Gold in Mexico, and Platinum in Argentina. "Sin Ti... Sin Mi" was released as 5to Piso's second single, and reached No. 4 on both Top Latin Songs and Latin Pop Songs charts. On 24 April 2009, Arjona started the Quinto Piso Tour. The tour included 123 shows in the United States, Spain, Argentina, Guatemala, Colombia, Venezuela and Mexico, among many other countries in Latin America, and ended on 18 June 2010.

Although many believe is a treshed [sic] topic, it isn't for a Cuban, be it on the island or Florida. The status of this dispute hasn't changed since 1959 and I've never seen something as disgusting as a rivality [sic] between people created by politics. Chávez can fight with Uribe, Fidel with Obama, but does this have to do with two third-generation cousins that inherit an enmity from a politic matter[?].

—Ricardo Arjona in a discussion about the political theme of "Puente".

The Quinto Piso Tour was one of the most successful tours made by a Latin artist, with more than one million attendees from 19 countries. He received in 2010 the "Latin Tour of the Year" Billboard Latin Music Award for the tour. On 26 February 2010, he participated in the 2010 Viña del Mar International Song Festival as one of the top performers. His performance was followed by Colombian singer Fanny Lu. One hour after Lu's performance, a 8.8 magnitude massive earthquake affected the south-central regions of Chile. On social networks, Arjona was jokingly blamed, with remarks such as "earthquakes go where he goes", making reference also to the earthquake felt in Mexico after the singer arrived. After the tour, Arjona announced his twelfth studio album, Poquita Ropa, which was released on 24 August 2010. It was preceded by the genre-mixing track "Puente", an ode to Havana, Cuba's largest and capital city. The song failed to break in the upper tier of Billboard charts, and was reportedly prohibited in Cuba. The album became his third to debut or reach No. 1 on the Top Latin Albums chart. Within two weeks of release, the album received a Gold certification in Chile, United States, Colombia and Puerto Rico; and Platinum certification in Mexico and Argentina.

The album marked a change in Arjona's sound, which he called a "stripped-down version" of his music. Birchmeier gave the album a somewhat positive review, saying that it was a "stripped-down acoustic effort" yet considered it "impressive". Two more singles were released from Poquita Ropa, "Vida", a song the singer dedicated to his recently deceased father; and "Marta", an autobiographical song whose music video stars Edith González. Both, like the lead single, failed to gain much airplay in the U.S., and charted poorly.

=== 2011–2013: Independiente, Metamorfosis and world tour ===
Arjona released his thirteenth studio album, Independiente, on 4 October 2011. It became his fourth number-one on the Top Latin Albums chart the week ending 22 October 2011; and within a week went Gold in Chile, United States and Mexico; and Platinum in Venezuela and Argentina. Independiente was his first release as an independent artist, appearing on his Metamorfosis label, a company he created to refocus his career. The album was distributed by Warner. Billboard noted that although other groups have decided to go independent after working with major record labels, Arjona was by far the most important artist in Latin pop to do so. By the end of 2012, the album sold more than 500,000 copies in the United States and 4,000,000 copies worldwide.

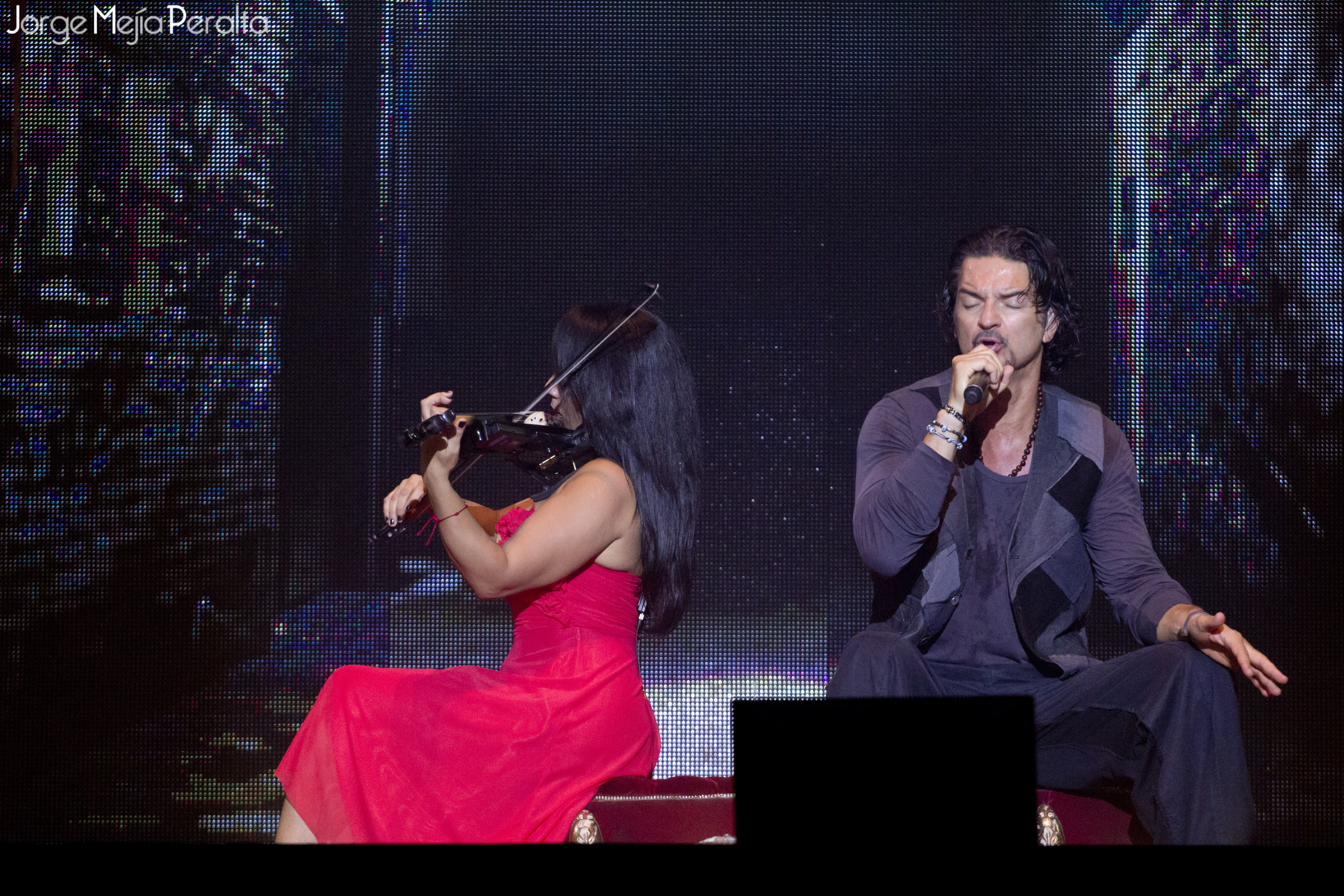
Arjona singing in Managua, Nicaragua.

"El Amor" was released in August 2011 as the lead single from Independiente; it managed to top both the US Latin Songs and Latin Pop Songs charts. It also became a hit in the rest of Latin America, reaching number one in several countries. "Fuiste Tú", a collaboration with Guatemalan singer Gaby Moreno, followed as second single in February 2013; it reached number two on the Latin Songs chart, and topped the Latin Pop Songs chart. On May, Arjona released the music video for "Mi Novia Se Me Está Poniendo Vieja." However, "Te Quiero" was released as third single in July 2012, and it became the second song off the album to top the Latin Songs chart. This made Independiente Arjona's first album to ever have two number-one hits on that chart. The song also topped the Latin Pop Songs chart, becoming the third song off the album to do so. "Si Tu No Existieras" was released in November 2012, and managed to peak at number 14 in Mexico.

To promote the album, Arjona embarked on the Metamorfosis World Tour. The show, his first since 2009's Quinto Piso Tour, comprised five legs across North and Latin America. It ran from January 2012 until March 2013 and included 102 shows in 18 countries, with an estimated attendance of over one million people. The tour opened in Toluca, where he had started all of his concert tours, and grossed more than $13.4 million in the United States.

=== 2021: Blanco y Negro tour ===
In September 2021, Arjona announced a 25-date North America tour, named Blanco y Negro. The tour, presented by Loud and Live, kicked off March 24, 2022 at the Kiva Auditorium in Albuquerque and concluded on June 11, 2022 at Coliseo de Puerto Rico in San Juan.

== Personal life ==
In 1988, during his time in Buenos Aires, Argentina, he met Puerto Rican Leslie Torres with whom he began a long-distance relationship as Arjona had decided to stay in Mexico for a few years. Leslie occasionally visited him, until 1992 when they got married in an impromptu ceremony in Las Vegas. Before arriving in Las Vegas he decided to try his luck in a casino playing blackjack and lost almost all the money he had with him. Upon arriving in Las Vegas after settling in a hotel, with the little money he had left he tried his luck again at gambling and made a fortune.

The year they married, Torres gave birth to their daughter, Adria, who currently works as an actress; two years later in 1994, their son Ricardo was born. After ten years of marriage, they announced their separation. Although they were legally separated as of 2005, for 3 years they fought for custody of their children during which she accused him of violence.

In 2010, began his current romantic relationship with Venezuelan model Deisy Arvelo, with whom he had his third child, Nicolás Arjona Arvelo. On September 27 of that same year his father Arjona Moscoso died at the age of 78. Three years later, on December 4, 2013, his mother Nohemí Morales died at the age of 71.

== Music and style ==
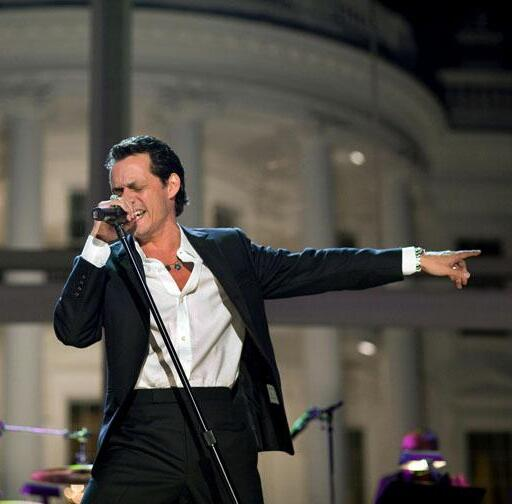
Marc Anthony sang alongside Arjona on the salsa version of "Historia de Taxi".

Arjona's primary musical style is Latin pop. He usually sings without the help of featured or additional singers. His style varied over the years, as Arjona took risks to keep his music from becoming stale. In contrast to the ballad-laden Déjame Decir Que Te Amo, on the following two albums Arjona experimented with a range of pop/rock styles. Animal Nocturno intersperses energetic rock songs among heartfelt ballads, and the instrumentation is heavy on guitar, synthesizer, and drums. On Historias, each song is stylistically distinct and the instrumentation is varied. Around two dozen instruments were used on the album, including horns, piano and Hammond B-3, and strings. On Si El Norte Fuera El Sur, he crafted a relatively low-key effort characterized by intimate songs about love, culture, and politics. Most of the songs were written in 1995 while Arjona was touring and are performed acoustically with Caribbean touches. Besides a couple of rockers, the songs are fairly even in tone and tempo.

In Galería Caribe, Arjona explored Afro-Caribbean sounds, employing traditional rhythms such as guaracha, bachata, merengue, and salsa. On Santo Pecado, Arjona explored the use of symphonic sounds on his ballads, amidst a couple of rock songs stylistically similar to those on Sin Daños a Terceros. This album included the song "La Nena (Bitácora de un Secuetro)", in which Arjona relates the story of a girl who is kidnapped by her uncle. Then, in 2005, Arjona adopted new sounds in Adentro. Gutierrez considered the instrumentation, performance, and overall sonic palette to be "minimalist" and "unassuming". On this album, Arjona included more Latin sounds, Mexican and Tejano music on "Mojado", a song about immigration; merengue and Colombian tones on "Adiós Melancolía", and some on "No Te Cambio Por Nada".

On 2007's Quién Dijo Ayer, Arjona reworked past songs to fit a new style. For example, he gave "Si El Norte Fuera El Sur" a ska beat, and performed with the aid of Panteón Rococó. He transformed "Historia de Taxi" into a salsa song, with the help of American singer Marc Anthony and pianist Sergio George, who commented that "It's been interesting to work with two figures from different music worlds on the interest of making good music." He further stated that "every time a reunion of this kind happens, it's a reason to celebrate." Birchmeier commented, "While only a couple of the new versions depart stylistically from the originals, the contemporary productions breathe new life into these songs." "Realmente No Estoy Tan Solo" was re-recorded with singer Sandro. This turned out to be the last song recorded by the latter, who died 4 January 2010. This album included three new songs. The lead single, "Quién" was written by Arjona and produced by himself and Torres. "Quiero" and "Espantapájaros" are the other two new songs on the album.

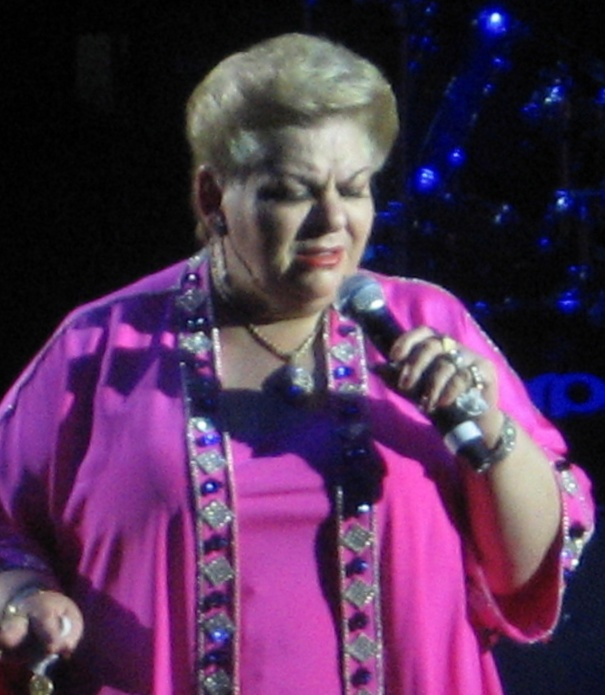
Paquita la del Barrio sang along with Arjona on ranchera "Ni Tu Ni Yo".

5to Piso is mainly driven by piano and strings. Exceptions are "La Bailarina Vecina", crafted with pure orchestral arrangements; and "Ni Tú Ni Yo", a Ranchera style song featuring Paquita la del Barrio. The album also includes a song called "Que Nadie Vea", in which the artist sings about homosexuality. On 5to Piso, Arjona commented that he tried to recoup the freshness of his first albums, saying that he "tried to reconcile a little with the Ricardo Arjona from the first albums to let out some of that freshness that makes so good to the songs." Poquita Ropa offered a drastic change in which Arjona minimized the number of instruments. The result was a set of a cappella performances. Arjona commented about this album that "music and women look better with little clothes." Production was handled by Arjona and Dan Warner, who also worked with Shakira, Celine Dion and Christina Aguilera. Birchmeier gave the album a somewhat positive review, saying that it was a "stripped-down acoustic effort", considering it "impressive". He also commented that Poquita Ropa "finds Arjona at his most naked, backed by spare arrangements of acoustic guitar, piano, and Hammond B-3 along with occasional touches of strings, woodwinds, and chorus vocals."

"Fuiste Tú"
A sample of "Fuiste Tú" from Independiente, displaying the first chorus sung by Arjona and Gaby Moreno.

"Puente", the lead single, is the only notable exception. It lasts eight and a half minutes and is divided in three parts. The first is sung mainly with a piano. The second part is a ballad with Caribbean and Latin sounds, with some salsa and Cuban influences. The third mixes salsa and merengue, with Cuban influences. "Puente" resembles Arjona's work on Galería Caribe. This album was the first since Adentro, that Arjona worked without Torres. In Independiente, Arjona returned to his trademark sound, which Torres helped craft. David Jeffries of Allmusic gave the album a somewhat positive review. He compared the production values and musical style of Independiente with those of past albums Animal Nocturno and Historias, stating, "Returning fans will revel in this combination of freedom and growth, and appreciate the return of producer Tommy Torres, the man who has been behind the boards for quite a few of Arjona's most popular releases", referring precisely to the absence of Torres in the production of Poquita Ropa.

== Discography ==
- Déjame Decir Que Te Amo (1986)
- Jesús, Verbo No Sustantivo (1988)
- Del Otro Lado del Sol (1991)
- Animal Nocturno (1993)
- Historias (1994)
- Si El Norte Fuera El Sur (1996)
- Sin Daños a Terceros (1998)
- Galería Caribe (2000)
- Santo Pecado (2002)
- Adentro (2005)
- 5to Piso (2008)
- Poquita Ropa (2010)
- Independiente (2011)
- Viaje (2014)
- Circo Soledad (2017)
- Blanco (2020)
- Negro (2021)
- Seco (2025)

== Awards and nominations ==
In 1993, he received the Rafael Álvarez Ovalle Order from the then President of Guatemala, Ramiro de León Carpio, for his international accomplishments. At USAC a library hall bears his name. His birthplace, Jocotenango, named a street after him. In 2017, Arjona received the Lifetime Achievement Award at the 2017 Billboard Latin Music Awards. Arjona is also a recipient of the Order of the Quetzal, Guatemala's highest decoration. In August 2015, Arjona returned the Order of the Quetzal, with which he had been bestowed upon by president Otto Pérez Molina in 2013, and demanded Pérez Molina's resignation, amid accusations of corruption.

== See also ==
- List of best-selling Latin music artists
- List of Guatemalans
- Music of Guatemala
