= 2011 in Latin music =

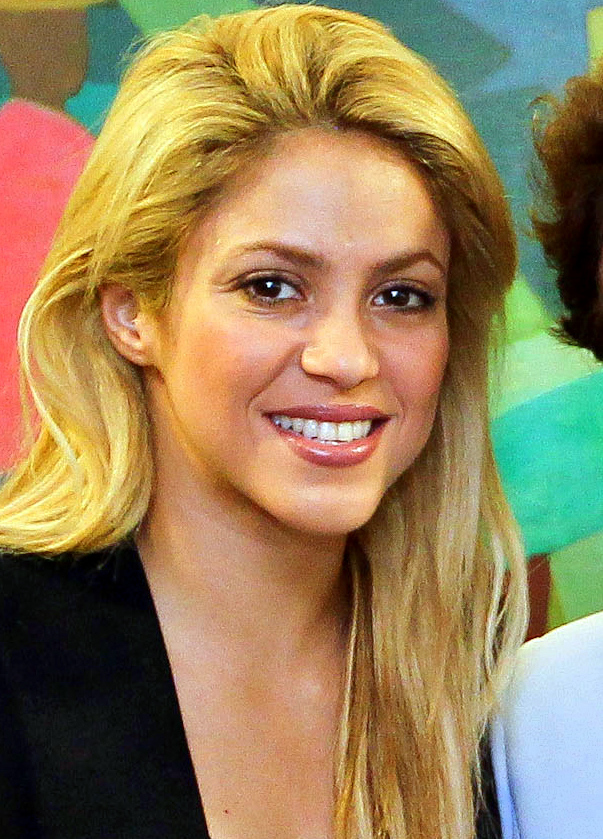
Colombian singer Shakira was named Top Latin Artist of the Year in the United States by Billboard.

This is a list of notable events in Latin music (i.e. Spanish- and Portuguese-speaking music from Latin America, Europe, and the United States) that took place in 2011.

== Events ==
- January 8 — Billboard revamps the methodology for the Latin Rhythm Airplay chart to only track Latin rhythm songs from Spanish-language radio stations in the United States. Previously, the Latin Rhythm Airplay chart ranked the most-played songs on Latin rhythm radio stations regardless of genre.
- November 10 — The 12th Annual Latin Grammy Awards are held at the Mandalay Bay Events Center in Las Vegas, Nevada.
  - Calle 13 breaks the record for the most awarded artist in a single ceremony with nine wins including Record of the Year and Song of the Year for "Latinoamérica" and Album of the Year for Entren Los Que Quieran.
  - Sie7e wins Best New Artist.
  - Colombian singer Shakira is honored as the Latin Recording Academy Person of the Year.

== Bands formed ==
- Pablo Alborán
- Max Capote
- 3Ball MTY
- Natalia Jiménez
- Dulce María
- El Bebeto y su Banda Patria Chica
- Monchy & Nathalia
- Loisaidas
- Henry Santos

== Number-one albums and singles by country ==
- List of Hot 100 number-one singles of 2011 (Brazil)
- List of number-one albums of 2011 (Mexico)
- List of number-one albums of 2011 (Portugal)
- List of number-one albums of 2011 (Spain)
- List of number-one singles of 2011 (Spain)
- List of number-one Billboard Latin Albums from the 2010s
- List of number-one Billboard Top Latin Songs of 2011

== Awards ==
- 2011 Premio Lo Nuestro
- 2011 Billboard Latin Music Awards
- 2011 Latin Grammy Awards
- 2011 Tejano Music Awards

== Albums released ==
=== First quarter ===
==== January ====
Day	Title	Artist	Genre(s)	Singles	Label
11	Al Frente y de Frente	Noel Torres			
11	Deja La Vida Volar – En Gira	Mercedes Sosa	Chacarera, Chamamé, Zamba, Folk		Sony Music Latin
11	Reset	Funky	Reggaeton, Conscious		Funkytown Music
12	Las Puertas Del Infierno	Los Inquietos del Norte			
18	Ni Una Lagrima Mas	Olga Tañón	Merengue, Salsa, Ballad		Mia Musa Music
18	Laru Beya	Aurelio			Sub Pop, Next Ambiance
23	Extraordinário Amor De Deus	Aline Barros	Ballad		MK Music
25	Los Vaqueros: El Regreso	Wisin & Yandel	Hip Hop, Reggaeton	"Zun Zun Rompiendo Caderas" "Tu Olor"	Machete Music
25	Brazilian Guitar Quartet Plays Villa-Lobos	Brazilian Guitar Quartet			Delos
25	Villa-Lobos Trio Play: Heitor Villa-Lobos, Astor Piazzolla & Lucio Bruno-Videla	Villa-Lobos Trio			
26	Ao Vivo	Paula Fernandes	Sertanejo, Country		Universal Music, Mercury

==== February ====
Day	Title	Artist	Genre(s)	Singles	Label
1	Música + Alma + Sexo	Ricky Martin	Latin	"The Best Thing About Me Is You/Lo Mejor De Mi Vida Eres Tú" "Más" "Frío" "Samba"	Sony Music Latin
8	El Patrón: Invencible	Tito El Bambino	Reggaeton	"Llueve el Amor" "Llama Al Sol"	Siente Music
15	Forever	R.K.M & Ken-Y			
22	Monchy & Nathalia	Monchy & Nathalia	Bachata		Terramusic, Venevision International Music, LLC
22	Live	Roberto Tapia			

==== March ====
Day	Title	Artist	Genre(s)	Singles	Label
1	Piazzolla Plays Piazzolla	Escalandrum			Warner Music Argentina
4	Chopin	Clara Sverner	Romantic		Azul Music
7	Calma	Omar Sosa			Ota Records
8	Mi Música	Gocho	RnB/Swing, Reggaeton, Merengue	"Dándole" "Si Te Digo La Verdad"	New Era Entertainment, Universal Music Latin Entertainment, Vene Music
8	Entre la Ciudad y el Mar	Gustavo Galindo			Surco
10	Corazón de Miel	El Binomio de Oro	Vallenato		Global Entertainment Music
10	Salve São Francisco	Geraldo Azevedo	MPB		Biscoito Fino
15	Pursuit of Radical Rhapsody	Al Di Meola	Fusion, Jazz-Rock		Telarc, Songsurfer Records
15	Not So Commercial	Los Amigos Invisibles	Dance-Pop, Downtempo, Pop rock, Latin, Breaks, Funk, Dub, Leftfield		Nacional Records, Gozadera Records
15	10 Milles per Veure una Bona Armadura	Manel	Catalan Music		Warner Music Spain, DiscMedi Blau
21	El Número Siete	Chente Barrera			
21	Una y Otra Vez	Sergent Garcia			Cumbancha
22	2011	Intocable	Tejano		Good i Music
22	Gloria	Gloria Trevi	Latin Pop	"Me Río de Ti" "Vestida de Azúcar" "La Noche"	Universal Music Latino
22	De Sinaloa para el Mundo	Calibre 50	Norteño		Disa Records
22	Sigo Estando Contigo	El Trono de México	Norteño		Fonovisa Records, Universal Music Latin Entertainment
22	Perreología	Alexis & Fido	Reggaeton	"Contestame El Teléfono" "Energía" "Donde Estés Llegaré"	Sony Music Latin, Wild Dogz Inc
22	MTV Unplugged/Música de Fondo	Zoé	Alternative rock		Capitol Latin
22	A Toda Madre	Banda Los Recoditos	Ranchera, Banda		Disa, Universal Music Latin Entertainment
22	Soy Mexicano	Los Huracanes del Norte			
22	Bien Acompañado	Reyli	Ballad, Pop rock		Sony Music
24	Camaleón	Sunny Sauceda y Todo Eso			
28	Morir y Existir – En Vivo	Gerardo Ortíz			Sony Music Latin
29	Una Historia Para Siempre	Pesado	Norteño, Tejano, Ranchera		Disa
29	Muy Afortunados	Los Titanes De Durango			
29	Tener En Cuenta	Alberto Cortez			
29	Em Santidade	Ministério Adoração e Vida	Gospel		Paulinas COMEP

=== Second quarter ===
==== April ====
Day	Title	Artist	Genre(s)	Singles	Label
3	Drama y Luz	Maná	Pop rock	"Lluvia al Corazón" "Amor Clandestino" "El Verdadero Amor Perdona" "Mi Reina del Dolor"	Warner Music Latina
5	Huevos Rancheros	Joan Sebastian	Ranchera		Fonovisa Records
5	Original	José Alberto "El Canario"	Salsa		Los Canarios Music
5	Viaje a las estrellas	Tercer Cielo	Bachata		Kasa Producciones
8	Tu Número Uno	Peter Manjarrés & Sergio Luis Rodríguez	Vallenato		Codiscos, Costeño
12	DEL Records Presenta Enfermedad Masiva	Various artists			
16	Depois de Um Longo Inverno	CPM 22	Ska, Hardcore, Pop rock		Performance Music
17	Corazón Bombea/Vivo	Doctor Krápula	Ska		Intolerancia, Sony Music
18	Multishow ao Vivo Paralamas Brasil Afora	Os Paralamas do Sucesso			EMI
19	Un Siglo de Amor	Tierra Cali			Vene Music
19	Gran Rex	Bunbury	Pop rock		EMI Music Spain, S.A., Capitol Latin
26	The Last Mambo	Cachao	Descarga, Mambo		Eventus
29	Vos y Yo	Susana Rinaldi and Leopoldo Federico			
29	Quinze	Jota Quest	Pop rock		Sony Music

==== May ====
Day	Title	Artist	Genre(s)	Singles	Label
1	¿Y Ahora Qué Hacemos?	Jarabe de Palo			
3	Al Fin Te Encontré	Río Roma			
3	Remando	Saúl Hernández			
3	Mucha Cosa Buena	Sie7e		"Tengo Tu Love"	
4	Quando Deus Se Calou	Pe. Zezinho, scj			
9	A Trupe Delirante no Circo Voador	Pitty			
10	Nuestra	La Vida Bohème			
10	Travieso Carmesí	Alondra de la Parra			
10	Pablo Alborán	Pablo Alborán	Latin pop	"Solamente Tú" "Miedo"	
12	La Pequeñas Cosas	Josemi Carmona			
15	Ao Vivo no Rock in Rio	Ira! e Ultraje A Rigor			
16	A Tiempo	Ha*Ash			
16	Fácil	Maldita Nerea			
17	Llegamos Y Nos Quedamos	Conjunto Atardecer			
20	Bola De Ratas	El Compa Sacra: El Ultimo Razo			
23	La Orilla de mi Pelo	Niña Pastori			
24	MTV Unplugged: Los Tigres del Norte and Friends	Los Tigres del Norte	Norteño	"Golpes en el Corazón" "La Jaula de Oro" "América"	Fonovisa
24	Material Defectuoso	Extremoduro			
26	Alma Lírica Brasileira	Mônica Salmaso			
28	Live in Chicago	Chuchito Valdes			
31	En Primera Fila	Franco De Vita	Latin pop	"Tan Sólo Tú" "Si Quieres Decir Adiós"	Sony Music Latin
31	Grandes Canciones	Noel Schajris			

==== June ====
Day	Title	Artist	Genre(s)	Singles	Label
1	Bachata Stereo	Daniel Santacruz			
6	Forver	Chick Corea, Stanley Clarke and Lenny White			
7	Il Volo: Edicion en Español	Il Volo			
7	La Supremacía	Jorge Santa Cruz y Su Grupo Quinto Elemento			
7	Dile Al Corazón Que Camine	Jacobo Ramos			
14	Por Siempre Romanticos	BXS			
21	Un Nuevo Día	Jencarlos Canela			
21	20 Años de Éxitos En Vivo con Moderatto	Alejandra Guzmán	Latin pop	"Día de Suerte"	
21	Días Nuevos	Gian Marco			
21	Pure Imagination	Dave Valentin			
21	Monograma	José Rizo's Mongorama			
21	La Vida Es..	Alexander Acha			
21	Natalia	Natalia Jiménez			
22	Indeleble	Los Mesoneros			
27	Lo Que Tú Necesitas	Jorge Celedón and Jimmy Zambrano			
28	Tierra Firme	Luis Fonsi	Latin pop	"Gritar"	Universal Music Latino
28	Orale	Mariachi Divas de Cindy Shea			
28	Fiesta Criolla: Latin-American Orchestral Works	Gabriel Castagna			
28	30 Aniversario En Vivo	Los Invasores de Nuevo León			

=== Third quarter ===
==== July ====
Day	Title	Artist	Genre(s)	Singles	Label
5	Peligro	Reik			
5	Mas Amigos	Avizo			
6	Sueño Electro II	Belanova			
6	D.A.S. 2011	Los Amos de Nuevo León			
16	Puros Trankazos	Various artists			
18	Turista de Amor	Jotdog			
19	Soy y Seré	Luis Enrique	Salsa	"Locos los 2" "El Reto" "Descontrólame"	
22	Músicas Para Churrascos Vol. 1	Seu Jorge			
26	El Amor Existe	Jerry Rivera	Salsa	"Solo Pienso en Ti" "Solo Con un Beso" "El Amor Existe"	
27	Forró Chorado	Oswaldinho do Acordeon			
29	Aquí En Tu Presencia	Carlos Carcache			

==== August ====
Day	Title	Artist	Genre(s)	Singles	Label
1	Dvorak Symphony No. 7; In Nature's Realm, Scherzo Capriccioso	José Serebrier			
2	El Marco De Mis Recuerdos	Marisela			
9	Pelo Sabor do Gesto em Cena	Zeila Duncan			
9	Como el Fénix	Patrulla 81			
20	Amor a la Musica	Mariachi Los Arrieros Del Valle			
25	Introducing Henry Santos	Henry Santos			
23	Aquí Estoy Yo	Milly Quezada	Merengue	"Toma Mi Vida"	
23	Golpes De Pecho	Cristina			
23	25 Concierto Conmemorativo	Marcos Witt			
30	Alma Adentro: The Puerto Rican Songbook	Miguel Zenón			
30	Jerry González and El Comando de la Clave	Jerry González and El Comando de la Clave			
31	No Me Compares Con Nadie	Silvestre Dangond and Juancho De la Espriella			

==== September ====
Day	Title	Artist	Genre(s)	Singles	Label
2	Banda Sonora	Presuntos Implicados			
5	Pra Ser Feliz	Daniel			
5	Da Falla: Noches En Los Jardines de España	Javier Perianes and Josep Pons			
6	Negociaré con la pena	Pepe Aguilar			
6	Prisionero de tus Brazos	Beto Zapata			
6	Vuela Muy Alto	Duelo			
13	Watch Out! Ten Cuidao!	Mambo Legend Orchestra			
13	Bolero	Son de Tikiza			
13	Cometas por el cielo	La Oreja de Van Gogh			
13	The Return of the Bad Boys 2011	Jimmy Gonzalez y El Grupo Mazz			
18	Sol da Justiça	Ministério de Louvor Diante do Trono			
19	La Cuenta Atrás	Vega			
19	Elo	Maria Rita			
20	Bela y Sus Moskitas Muertas	Beatriz Luengo			
20	Sin Compasión	Pasión Vega			
20	Otro Nivel De Música	J Alvarez			
20	Zona Preferente 25 (En Vívo)	Mijares			
23	Independiente	Ricardo Arjona	Latin pop, rock	"El Amor" "Fuiste Tú" "Mi Novia Se Me Está Poniendo Vieja" "Te Quiero" "Si Tu No Existieras"	Metamorfosis
23	Mi tributo al Festival	Yuri			
27	Canciones Que Duelen	Espinoza Paz			
27	Chano y Dizzy!	Poncho Sanchez and Terence Blanchard			
27	30 Años de Cumbia (En Vivo)	Margarita la Diosa de la Cumbia			
27	Hacia lo Salvaje	Amaral			
30	Ilusión	Fonseca	"Desde Que No Estás" "Eres Mi Sueño"		

=== Fourth quarter ===
==== October ====
Day	Title	Artist	Genre(s)	Singles	Label
3	Grandes Varones del Tango	Tango VIP			
4	Vivo En Tu Piel	Alerta Zero			
6	Entre Dios Y El Diablo	Gerardo Ortíz			
10	Nada Iguales	La Adictiva Banda San José de Mesillas			
11	De Corazon Ranchero	Voz de Mando			
18	Pecados y milagros	Lila Downs			
18	Supremo	Chino & Nacho			
18	OV7 Desde El Palacio De Los Deportes	OV7			
18	Llegamos, Estamos y Seguimos	Noel Torres			
20	Celebração & Sacrifício	Beto Lee			
24	Acústico (En Vivo)	Emmanuel			
25	Amar No Es Suficiente	Edith Márquez			
25	Los Días Intactos	Manolo García			
28	Querian Perreo	J King y Maximan	Reggaeton		White Lion
31	O Que Você Quer Saber de Verdade	Marisa Monte			

==== November ====
Day	Title	Artist	Genre(s)	Singles	Label
1	Mi Amigo El Príncipe	Cristian Castro	Latin pop	"Lo Dudo"	Universal Music Latino
1	Mi Última Grabación	Tito Nieves	Salsa	"Eres Linda"	
1	Así	Shaila Dúrcal			
1	Amor de Alma	Victor & Leo			
1	Pandora – XXV Años (En Vivo)	Pandora			
4	¡¡Buenos Dias, Mundo!!	Rosana			
6	Reconocer	Pamela Rodriguez			
8	Formula, Vol. 1	Romeo Santos	Bachata, Latin pop, R&B	"You" "Promise" "Mi Santa" "All Aboard" "Rival" "La Diabla"	Sony Music Latin
8	Flamenco	Diana Navarro			
8	Homenaje a las Grandes Canciones, Vol. II	Kalimba			
8	La Mejor De Todas	Banda El Recodo de Cruz Lizarraga			
8	DEL Records Presenta: Enfermedad Masiva Vol. 2	Various artists			
10	Via Dalma II	Sergio Dalma			
10	Chitãozinho & Xororó – 40 Anos – Sinfônico	Chitãozinho & Xororó			
11	Inédito	Laura Pausini			
15	En Acústico	Pablo Alborán			
15	Brava!	Paulina Rubio	Latin pop	"Me Gustas Tanto"	
15	Márchate Y Olvídame	Julión Álvarez Y Su Norteño Banda			
15	La Verdadera Maquina	Franco El Gorila	Reggaeton	"Mi Musica Buena" "Cuando Cae La Noche" "Nobody Like You"	WY Records
20	Canibália – Ritmos do Brasil (Ao Vivo)	Daniela Mercury			
21	Joyas Prestadas: Pop and Joyas Prestadas: Banda	Jenni Rivera	Latin pop, banda	"¡Basta Ya!" "A Cambio de Que" "Detrás de Mi Ventana"	Fonovisa
21	Otra Vez	Vicente Fernández			
21	Sono Sono: Tite Curet	Various artists			
21	Afronauta	Caseroloops			
21	2.0	Estopa			
21	Aires de Navidad	N'Klabe	Salsa		
28	Caminos	Gaitanes			
29	Cuando Quieras	Antonio Cortés			
29	En Vivo Conciertos: Live In Spain 2010	Paco de Lucía	Flamenco		Universal

==== December ====
Day	Title	Artist	Genre(s)	Singles	Label
2	En Vivo Desde París	Shakira		"Je L'Aime à Mourir"	Epic
3	Rebeldes	Álex Anwandter			
5	Una Noche en el Teatro Real	David Bisbal			
6	Inténtalo	3Ball MTY			Fonovisa
6	¿Con Quién Se Queda El Perro?	Jesse & Joy			Warner Music Mexico
6	Disney's Los Muppets Banda Sonora Original de Walt Disney Records	Various artists			
6	Pídeme (En Vivo)	Diego Verdaguer			
6	Besos de Fuego	Alacranes Musical			
13	Para Mi	Yuridia			
13	Cordero: Caribbean Concertos For Guitar and For Violin	Guillermo Figueroa, I Solisti di Zagreb and Pepe Romero			
13	Licenciado Cantinas	Bunbury			
13	El Niño	Cosculluela			
18	Na Balada	Michel Teló			
19	Con Mucho Gusto Caray	Diomedes Díaz and Álvaro López			
20	De Miles A Uno	Christian Pagán			
20	Lo Que Me Dejastes	Siggno			
20	México Flamenco	Various artists			
21	Aquí En El Rancho	Miguel y Miguel			

=== Unknown date ===
Title	Artist	Genre(s)	Singles	Label
La Bala	Ana Tijoux	Hip hop		Oveja Negra

== Best-selling records ==
=== Best-selling albums ===
The following is a list of the top 10 best-selling Latin albums in the United States in 2011, according to Billboard.

Rank	Album	Artist
1	Prince Royce	Prince Royce
2	Viva el Príncipe	Cristian Castro
3	Drama y Luz	Maná
4	Sale el Sol	Shakira
5	Euphoria	Enrique Iglesias
6	Los Vaqueros: El Regreso	Wisin & Yandel
7	Dejarte de Amar	Camila
8	Música + Alma + Sexo	Ricky Martin
9	Don Omar Presents: Meet the Orphans	Don Omar
10	35 Aniversario	Los Bukis

=== Best-performing songs ===
The following is a list of the top 10 best-performing Latin songs in the United States in 2011, according to Billboard.

Rank	Single	Artist
1	"Corazón Sin Cara"	Prince Royce
2	"Taboo"	Don Omar
3	"Me Encantaría"	Fidel Rueda
4	"Danza Kuduro"	Don Omar featuring Lucenzo
5	"Give Me Everything"	Pitbull featuring Ne-Yo, Afrojack and Nayer
6	"Te Amo y Te Amo"	La Adictiva Banda San Jose de Mesillas
7	"Ni Lo Intentes"	Julión Álvarez y Su Norteño Banda
8	"You"	Romeo Santos
9	"Cuanto Me Cuesta"	La Arrolladora Banda El Limón
10	"Ven a Bailar"	Jennifer Lopez and Pitbull

== Deaths ==
- January 4 – Gustavo Kupinski, 36, Argentine guitarist (Los Piojos), car crash.
- January 10 – María Elena Walsh, 80, Argentine musician, playwright, writer, and composer
- January 21 – Eugenio "Totico" Arango, 76, Cuban percussionist and singer
- January 24 – Francisco Mata, 78, Venezuelan folk singer and composer.
- January 29 – Tony "Ham" Guerrero" American trumpeter and founder of Tortilla Factory
- February 7 – Helenita Vargas, 79, Colombian singer
- February 8 – Eugenio Toussaint, 56, Mexican jazz pianist, and composer
- February 13 – Manuel Esperón, 99, Mexican composer
- February 25 – Eneas Perdomo, 80, Venezuelan folk singer.
- March 10 – Mario Clavell, 88, Argentine singer and songwriter
- March 11 – Rita Guerrero, 47, Mexican performer and found of Santa Sabina
- March 26 – Lula Côrtes, 61, Brazilian musician (Paêbirú), throat cancer
- March 27 – Antonio Ambriz Garza, 73, American Tejano music manager
- April 8 – Daniel Catán, 62, Mexican composer.
- May 7 – Johnny Albino, 93, Puerto Rican bolero singer, heart attack.
- June 6 – Humberto "El Pecas" Navarro, Mexican drummer for Los Caminantes
- July 7 – Manuel Galbán, 80, Cuban guitarist (Buena Vista Social Club), heart attack.
- July 9 – Facundo Cabral, 74, Argentine singer and songwriter, shot.
- July 14 – Antonio Prieto, 85, Chilean singer and actor, cardiac arrest.
- July 26 – Joe Arroyo, 55, Colombian salsa/tropical singer.
- August 3 – Jorge Neri, Mexican composer, arranger, and producer
- August 5 – Cornelio Reyna Jr., 50, Mexican singer
- August 10 – Moraíto Chico II, 54, Spanish musician, cancer.
- August 22 – Enrique Cáceres Méndez, 77, Mexican singer and composer, former member of Los Panchos
- August 26 – Lorenzo Morales, 97, Colombian vallenato composer
- August 28 – Fidel Gamboa, 50, Costa Rican singer (Malpaís)
- October 21 – Edmundo Ros, 100, Trinidadian-born Venezuelan British bandleader of Latin American music.
- November 22 – Horacio Villafañe, 48, Argentine guitarist and founder of Todos Tus Muertos
- November 23 – Montserrat Figueras, 69, Spanish soprano
- December 1 – Wilson Choperena, 87, Colombian songwriter
- December 6 – Chucho Ferrer, 82, Mexican music arranger
- December 12 – Pupi Campo, 91, Cuban pianist and bandleader
- December 13 – Juan “El Gallo” Calderón, 75, Spanish Mexican music journalist, radio, and TV host
- December 17 – Cesária Évora, 70, Cape Verdean singer, heart failure.
