= Mi Novia Se Me Está Poniendo Vieja =

Single by Ricardo Arjona

from the album Independiente
- Released: 8 May 2012
- Recorded: 2011
- Genre: Latin pop
- Length: 5:12
- Label: Metamorfosis, Warner Music
- Songwriter: Ricardo Arjona
- Producers: Ricardo Arjona, Dan Warner, Lee Levin

Ricardo Arjona singles chronology
| "Fuiste Tú" (2012) | "Mi Novia Se Me Está Poniendo Vieja" (2012) | "Te Quiero" (2012) |

"Mi Novia Se Me Está Poniendo Vieja" is a Latin pop song written by Guatemalan singer-songwriter Ricardo Arjona for his thirteenth studio album, Independiente (2011). It was produced by Arjona, Dan Warner and Lee Levin. It was released as the album's third single on 8 May 2012. The song was used by American telecommunications corporation AT&T on a commercial promoting the Nokia Lumia 900 smartphone, and has been widely performed on Arjona's Metamorfosis World Tour. A music video was filmed on the Universal Studios in Los Angeles, and is protagonized by Arjona alongside his son Ricardo Arjona Jr. In 2013, Arjona received a Song of the Year nomination at the 14th Latin Grammy Awards for the song.

== Background ==
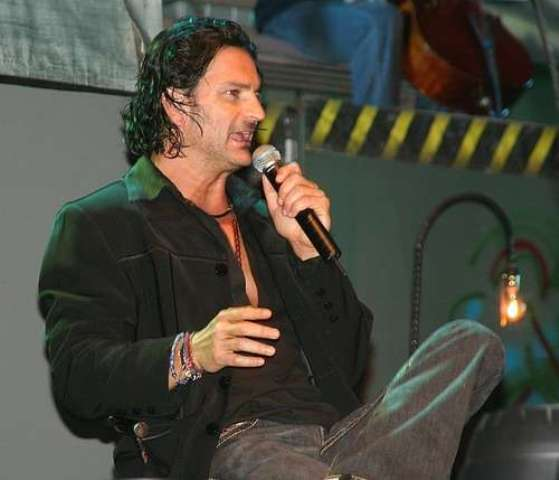
In 2011, Arjona founded his own record label, Metamorfosis.

Independiente is the first album Arjona released as an independent artist, and through his own record label, Metamorfosis, a company he created to refocus his career. Presided by Arjona and some friends, Metamorfosis is based in Miami and Mexico City, and also includes the photographer and director Ricardo Calderón, Universal Music México's executive Humberto Calderon and BMG's Miriam Sommerz. Although the album is marketed with the new label, distribution was handled by Warner Music. Arjona commented many times, that he considered the way he decided to go independent raised more compromise than freedom, saying that "Inside the word 'Independent', even when it sounds like extreme freedom, there's a big amount of compromise and the responsibility of being able to administrate, in the best way possible, such independence."

Independiente was composed and written within one year, and marks the fourth time Arjona had collaborated with Tommy Torres, who had helped writing, composing, producing and providing backing vocals. The other three albums in which the two artists had worked together are Quién Dijo Ayer, in which Torres helped producing the singles "Quién" and "Quiero", and offering additional work on the new versions of Arjona's hits; 5to Piso, and Adentro, respectively. Also, in the album, Arjona returned to his classic and trademark sound, which Torres has helped crafting it since six years now, after the drastic change he made in Poquita Ropa. On that album, the artist made use of the fewest instruments possible, simplifying his sound, and introducing what he called a "stripped-down version of his music".

Weeks before the release of Independiente, Arjona issued a letter in which he talked about his past relations with recording companies. In the letter, he revealed that he entered in his first record label as an exchange, commenting that "a producer, friend of mine, told them [the record label] that if they don't sign me they won't sign two artists he had [at that time]", and that he received the "minimum royalty percentage" out from his most successful albums. Billboard notes that although other groups have decided to launch independently their works after having a contract with major record labels, Arjona is by far the most important artist in the Latin pop to follow this trend.

== Composition ==
"Mi Novia Se Me Está Poniendo Vieja" is a latin pop ballad song with a length of five minutes and 12 seconds. It was composed within a year, as well as the rest of Independiente, and was produced by Arjona, alongside longtime collaborators Dan Warner, Lee Levin and Dan Rudin. A piano version of the song was recorded at the Jocoteco Studios in Mexico City, and was included as the last track on the album. This version was produced by Arjona and Victor Patrón, the latter whom also played the piano, the only instrument present on this version of the song.

Arjona wrote the song for his mother, Noemí Morales. She told him she didn't like it because it made her cry. He said that he "wrote the song as a gift for my mom in a Mother's Day and two sisters (a couple of years ago) [...] and I thought the idea of including it on the album was very good". Lyrically, "Mi Novia Se Me Esta Poniendo Vieja" revolves around how a son looks at their mother from a sentimental perspective, with Arjona singing "She loves me either if I was a warrior, or if I won the Nobel Prize for Peace / She doesn't care if I'm last or first, if I'm going as a conformist or as tenacious." He also said that he never thought to include the song in an album, just as happened with his single "Señora De Las Cuatro Decadas" from Historias back in 1994.

== Release and promotion ==
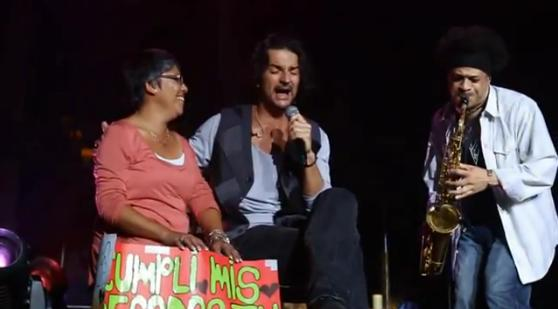
The song has been widely performed by Arjona on his Metamorfosis World Tour.

On 25 April, Arjona started promotion of the song by posting on his website a preview of the music video, which was released a few days after, on 30 April 2012. It was intended to be a promotional single to coincide with Mother's Day, and was released in the United States and Mexico as a digital download on 8 May 2012.

=== Music video ===
The music video was filmed on the Universal Studios in Los Angeles, and is protagonized by himself and his son Ricardo Arjona Jr. It was directed by Robert García. The video was released on 29 April 2012. In it, Arjona is seen walking throughout a city. While he walks with a guitar on his shoulder, on the road of that city, he encounters with many people, including a musician and a police man while remembering memories of his life.

=== Live performances and media appearances ===
"Mi Novia Se Me Está Poniendo Vieja" was in the set list for a televised program in 2011. The special included guest singers such as Gaby Moreno, Ricky Muñoz (from Mexican band Intocable) and Paquita la del Barrio. Broadcast by Televisa, the program was made to showcast the new fourteen songs included on Independiente. Ricky Muñoz commented that he was "happy to do things for Ricardo [Arjona]" and elaborated that the met each other "some time ago" and that it was "a very special situation." The show was later bordcasted on 5 November 2011 by Canal de las Estrellas. The song is also present on his ongoing Metamorfosis World Tour. It is performed while on one of the ambiences the concert, alongside "Acompañame A Estar Solo", "Dime Que No", "Como Duele" and "Señora De Las Cuatro Décadas".

"Mi Novia Se Me Está Poniendo Vieja" was also used by American telecommunications corporation AT&T on a commercial promoting the Nokia Lumia 900 smartphone. Titled "The Shoot", the spot, which also features Arjona, shows how a teenage boy uses his Nokia smartphone to record the singer's performance, and then showing it to his mother. The commercial was, as well as the song, released to coincide with Mother's Day.

== Track listing ==
- Digital download
1. "Mi Novia Se Me Está Poniendo Vieja" – 5:12
- Piano version
1. "Mi Novia Se Me Está Poniendo Vieja" (Piano version) – 5:05

== Personnel ==
Credits are taken from Independiente Liner notes.

Technical

- "Mi Novia Se Me Esta Poniendo Vieja" (Piano version) was recorded at Jocoteco Studios, Mexico City.

Standard version

- Ricardo Arjona — vocals
- Brian Lang — contrabass, recording engineer
- Lee Levin — bass, percussion, recording engineer
- Dan Warner — guitar, recording engineer
- Matt Rollings — Hammond B-3, accordion, recording engineer
- Chris McDonald — Chord arrangements, conductor
- Pamela Sixfin — violin
- David Angell — violin
- James Grosjean — viola
- Anthony LaMarchina — cello
- Carlos Cabral Jr. — recording engineer
- Isaías García — recording engineer
- Dan Rudin — recording engineer
- David Thoener — mixing engineer

Piano version

- Ricardo Arjona — vocals
- Victor Patrón — piano
- Isaías García — recording engineer
- Ben Wisch — mixing engineer
- Isaías García — recording engineer

== Charts ==
| Chart (2012) | Peak position |
|---|---|
| US Hot Latin Songs (Billboard) | 44 |
| US Latin Pop Airplay (Billboard) | 40 |

== Release history ==
Digital releases
| Country | Date | Format | Label |
|---|---|---|---|
| United States | 8 May 2012 | Digital download | Metamorfosis / Warner Music |
| Mexico | 8 May 2012 | Digital download | Metamorfosis / Warner Music |
| Argentina | 8 May 2012 | Digital download | Metamorfosis / Warner Music |
| Chile | 8 May 2012 | Digital download | Metamorfosis / Warner Music |
| Venezuela | 8 May 2012 | Digital download | Metamorfosis / Warner Music |
