= Si Tu No Existieras =

Single by Ricardo Arjona

from the album Independiente
- Released: 27 November 2012
- Recorded: 2011
- Genre: Latin pop
- Length: 4:02
- Label: Metamorfosis, Warner Music
- Songwriter: Ricardo Arjona
- Producers: Ricardo Arjona, Dan Warner, Lee Levin

Ricardo Arjona singles chronology
"Te Quiero" (2012)	"Si Tu No Existieras" (2012)	"Apnea" (2014)

"Si Tu No Existieras" is a Latin pop song by Guatemalan recording artist Ricardo Arjona, released on 27 November 2012 as the fifth single from his thirteenth studio album, Independiente (2011). The song was written by Arjona, who produced it with longtime collaborators Dan Warner and Lee Levin under their production name Los Gringos. Additional recording work was handled by Peter Wallace, Matt Rollings, Carlos "Cabral" Junior and Isaías García, and background vocals were provided by Roger Hudson.

At release, "Si Tu No Existieras" charted at number 14 on the Billboard Mexican Airplay chart. An accompanying music video for the song was released in November 2012. It was directed by Tamir Lotán, was edited by Nicolás Merkin, and is composed of live clips taken during Arjona's performances, as part of his Metamorfosis World Tour. It is the second video by Arjona that consists of live performances while on tour.

== Background ==
Weeks before the release of Independiente, Arjona issued a letter raising the issue of his past relationships with recording companies. He revealed the circumstances of his first contract: "a producer, friend of mine, told them [the record label] that if they did not sign me in, they won't sign two artists he had [at that time]". Arjona further explained that he received the "minimum royalty percentage" from his most successful albums. Independiente is Arjona's first independent release through his own label, Metamorfosis, a company he created to refocus his career. The company is controlled by Arjona and several friends (including photographer-director Ricardo Calderón, Universal Music México executive Humberto Calderon, and BMG's Miriam Sommerz), and is based in Miami and Mexico City.

Arjona commented that his independence represented compromise more than freedom, stating that "Inside the word 'Independent', even when it sounds like extreme freedom, there's a large amount of compromise and the responsibility of being able to administrate, in the best way possible, such independence". Billboard stated that, although other groups have released independent albums following contracts with major labels, Arjona is the most important Latin pop artist to do so.

== Composition ==
"Si Tu No Existieras"
A 27-second sample of "Si Tu No Existieras", featuring the chorus performed by Arjona, as well as the piano instrumentation played by Matt Rollings.

"Si Tu No Existieras" is a Latin pop song written and produced by Arjona, alongside longtime collaborators Dan Warner and Lee Levin under their production name Los Gringos. Roger Hudson provided additional background vocals for the song, and Matt Rollings, Carlos "Cabral" Junior and Isaías García served as recording engineers, along with Warner and Levin. Rollings also provided the piano, Levin played the drums, and Warner the bass, with the help of Craig Nelson. A group of nine personnel led by Pamela Sixfin provided the violins; James Grosjean and Monisa Angell played the violas; and Anthony LaMarchina, along with Julia Tanner, the cellos. Xarah handled additional work with Pro Tools.

== Promotion ==
=== Music video ===
Arjona included scenes from his Metamorfosis World Tour (pictured) in the music video of "Si Tu No Existieras". Although the song was not performed on the tour, he sang it on a program broadcast by Televisa in 2011.

The music video for "Si Tu No Existieras" was released on 27 November 2012. The video is composed of live clips taken during Arjona's performances, as part of his Metamorfosis World Tour. The video was directed by Tamir Lotán and was edited by Nicolás Merkin. This was the second time Arjona released a music video recorded from his live performances while on tour, after the music video for "Te Quiero", released in June 2012. The video starts by showing behind-the-scenes shots of Arjona, his team, and his fans while the song begins to play. Then, images from his live performances are interpolated with the face of a woman singing the lyrics, as well as doing several things related to those lyrics.

=== Live performances ===
"Si Tu No Existieras" was in the set list for a televised program in 2011. The special included guest singers such as Gaby Moreno, Ricky Muñoz (from Mexican band Intocable) and Paquita la del Barrio. Broadcast by Televisa, the program was made to showcase the new fourteen songs included on Independiente. Ricky Muñoz commented that he was "happy to do things for Ricardo [Arjona]" and elaborated that they met each other "some time ago" and that it was "a very special situation." The show was later broadcast on 5 November 2011 by Canal de las Estrellas.

== Track listing ==
- Digital download
1. "Si Tu No Existieras" – 4:02

== Credits and personnel ==
Credits are taken from Independiente liner notes.

- Ricardo Arjona – Producer, lyrics, lead vocals
- Roger Hudson – Background vocals, chorus
- Dan Warner – Bass, guitars, additional keyboards, programming, recording engineer
- Lee Levin – Drums, percussion, recording engineer
- Matt Rollings – Piano, recording engineer
- Chris McDonald – Chord arrangement, conductor
- David Thoener – Mixing engineer
- Dan Rudin – Recording engineer
- Carlos "Cabral" Junior – Recording engineer
- Isaías Garcia – Recording engineer
- Pamela Sixfin – Violin
- Connie Ellisor – Violin
- David Angell – Violin
- Mary Katherine VanOsdale – Violin
- Karen Winkelmann – Violin
- Carolyn Bailey – Violin
- Ern Hall – Violin
- Zeneba Bowers – Violin
- Cornelia Heard – Violin
- James Grosjean – Viola
- Monisa Angell – Viola
- Elizabeth Lamb – Viola
- Anthony LaMarchina – Cello
- Julia Tanner – Cello
- Craig Nelson – Bass
- Xarah – Pro Tools

== Charts ==
Chart (2012)	Peak position
Mexico (Billboard International)	14
