= Independiente (Ricardo Arjona album) =

Studio album by Ricardo Arjona
- Released: 23 September 2011
- Recorded: 2010–2011; Miami, FL (Jet Wash, Pick & Hammers, Wally World); Mexico City (Jocoteco Studios); New York City (Sterling Sound); Nashville, TN (My Space Recording, The Blue Grotto); Los Angeles (Studio R); Pembroke Pines, FL (The Tiki Room); Veracruz, Mexico (Cabanna Studio)
- Genres: Latin pop, rock
- Length: 63:15
- Labels: Metamorfosis, Warner Music
- Producers: Ricardo Arjona, Lee Levin, Dan Warner

Ricardo Arjona chronology
Poquita Ropa (2010)	Independiente (2011)	Canciones de Amor (2012)

Singles from Independiente
- 1. "El Amor" Released: 23 August 2011; 2. "Fuiste Tú" Released: 7 February 2012; 3. "Mi Novia Se Me Está Poniendo Vieja" Released: 8 May 2012; 4. "Te Quiero" Released: 5 July 2012; 5. "Si Tu No Existieras" Released: 27 November 2012

Independiente is the thirteenth Spanish-language studio album by Guatemalan singer-songwriter Ricardo Arjona, released on 23 September 2011. Recorded in the United States and Mexico, it was produced by Arjona with Dan Warner, Carlos Cabral "Junior", Lee Levin and Puerto Rican singer-songwriter Tommy Torres. The album—the first independent release by Arjona after he was signed by Sony Music in 1993 and Warner Music in 2008—was issued by his own label, Metamorfosis.

Composed and written in a year, the record marks Arjona and Torres' fourth collaboration. For Independiente, Arjona returns to his trademark sound after his stylistic departure for Poquita Ropa (2010). While producing the latter, he had used fewer instruments to simplify his sound, having introduced what had been called a "stripped-down acoustic effort" in his music. Independiente has been compared to his earlier recordings, Historias (1994) and Animal Nocturno (1993).

Independiente became Arjona's fourth number-one album on the Billboard Top Latin Albums where it debuted for the week ending 22 October 2011. For thirteen non-consecutive weeks it topped the Latin Pop Albums chart, and reached number one on the Mexican Albums Chart. It is his fifth consecutive album to chart on the Billboard 200 (reaching number sixty-five), and his fourth album to chart in Spain (peaking at number sixty-eight). Within one week after its release Independiente was certified gold in Chile, the United States and Mexico and certified platinum in Venezuela and Argentina.

Five singles have been released from the album. The lead single, "El Amor", became a commercial success in several Latin American countries and was number one on the Billboard Latin Songs and Latin Pop Songs charts. It was followed by "Fuiste Tú" (featuring Gaby Moreno), which reached number one on the Latin Pop Songs, number two on the Latin Songs charts and topped several other national charts. "Mi Novia Se Me Está Poniendo Vieja" was released in May 2012; "Te Quiero" in July 2012, and "Si Tu No Existieras" in November 2012. To promote Independiente, Arjona embarked on his Metamorfosis World Tour.

== Background ==
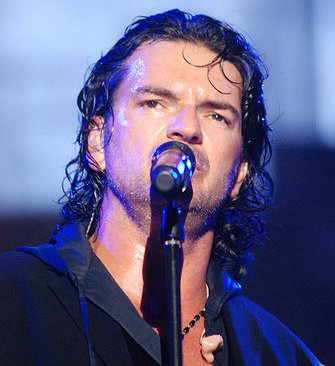
Arjona in a 2009 Miami performance

In 2010, Arjona wanted to change his musical style; after experimenting with using as few instruments as possible, he obtained a sound similar to an a capella performance (simplifying his sound) and introduced what he called a "stripped-down acoustic effort" to his music. This was heard on his twelfth studio album, Poquita Ropa. Arjona produced the album with Dan Warner, who has worked with Shakira, Celine Dion and Christina Aguilera. When promoting the album Arjona said, "[songs] are like women; they get things up and are so concerned about this that they forget that the less clothes, more beauty. The songs are often overwhelmed by ourselves, because we saturate them with arrangements looking to exalt their qualities and we end up hiding them". Poquita Ropa became the first album since Adentro which Arjona recorded without Torres.

Weeks before the release of Independiente, Arjona issued a letter raising the issue of his past relationships with recording companies. He revealed the circumstances of his first contract: "a producer, friend of mine, told them [the record label] that if they did not sign me in, they won't sign two artists he had [at that time]". Arjona further explained that he received the "minimum royalty percentage" from his most successful albums. Independiente is Arjona's first independent release through his own label: Metamorfosis, a company he created to refocus his career. The company is presided by Arjona and several friends (including photographer-director Ricardo Calderón, Universal Music México executive Humberto Calderon and BMG's Miriam Sommerz), and is based in Miami and Mexico City. Arjona commented that his independence represented compromise more than freedom, stating that "Inside the word 'Independent', even when it sounds like extreme freedom, there's a big amount of compromise and the responsibility of being able to administrate, in the best way possible, such independence". Billboard notes that, although other groups have released independent albums following contracts with major labels, Arjona is the most important Latin pop artist to do so. Although the album is marketed within the new label, distribution was handled by Warner Music.

== Production and recording ==
I got tired of complaining as everyone does and keep signing contracts to fall into the same of what we complain. The industry played along with those who are dedicated to this and in my case, with all the losses, generated the exhibition of my work in countries that I've never dreamed of. Today we change the complaints by ideas.

—Ricardo Arjona.

Independiente marked Arjona's fourth collaboration with Torres. The latter was a composer and producer, also receiving background-vocal credit. The musicians first worked together in 2005, when Arjona released his tenth studio album (Adentro). He stated that he first "tested" Torres by sending him the "hookiest and darkest tracks" on the album: "Acompañame A Estar Solo" and "Iluso". Torres then "went all out on the first demo, hiring a full band that included a string orchestra". In Quién Dijo Ayer (2007), Torres produced the singles "Quién" and "Quiero" and provided background vocals on the remastered versions of Arjona's past hits. In 5to Piso (2008), Torres produced several tracks; one was the lead single "Como Duele", considered Arjona's "biggest hit in years" by Jason Birchmeier of Allmusic.

The album was composed over a one-year period. Most of its production was handled by three producers familiar with Arjona's work: Dan Warner, Lee Levin and Dan Rudin. Tommy Torres also produced three tracks: the lead single "El Amor", second single "Fuiste Tú" and "Hay Amores". Victor Patrón produced two songs, ("Caudillo" and the piano version of "Mi Novia Se Me Está Poniendo Vieja") and Julio Chávez aided in the production of "Reconciliación". Arjona wrote all the songs except "El Amor" (which was co-written with Torres). The album was recorded and produced in several cities in the United States and Mexico. Independiente was mixed at the Blue Grotto in Nashville, Tennessee, and mastered by Tom Coyne and Aya Merrill at Sterling Sound in New York City. With Torres' return to producing Arjona regained the classic, trademark sound which Torres helped develop since 2005.

== Composition ==
"Mi Novia Se Me Está Poniendo Vieja" (Piano version)
A sample of the piano version of "Mi Novia Se Me Está Poniendo Vieja", performed by Victor Patrón while Arjona sings the verses

"Fuiste Tú"
A sample of "Fuiste Tú", displaying the second phrase sung by Gaby Moreno

Independiente opens with "Lo Que Está Bien Está Mal", a Latin pop song and the only track composed by Dan Warner instead of Arjona (who wrote the lyrics). "El Amor" was motivated by Arjona's desire to examine "those big, dark events within love that nobody talks about"; he continued, "[the] dark sides of love are extremely fundamental to understand its great value." Arjona added, "So many good things abould love has been shown that somebody had to turn it around and tell the bad ones". In a February 2012 interview, Arjona stated that "El Amor" was the "most tawdry" song he had released to date, explaining that their choice of the song was a "contradiction" because it was not "the song which could better represent the entire album". He described it as "very strong" and "a bit dark". The single marked Arjona's return to his signature, mainstream sound after the Cuban music influenced Poquita Ropa's lead single "Puente", a mixture of salsa and merengue which failed to make an impact in the United States.

The album includes "Fuiste Tú", a duet with Guatemalan singer Gaby Moreno. Its instrumentation consists of piano, violin, guitars, drums and other percussion. Although Arjona stated that he "had the possibilities to record this song with very well known people" he expressed his happiness with Moreno, revealing that "the possibilities of doing it with her, for me, are a celebration". He described Moreno as "incredibly talented", a "countrywoman" and a "fantastic human being". Arjona named "Fuiste Tú" as one of the most important songs on the album. "Mi Novia Se Me Está Poniendo Vieja" took two years to complete and Arjona dedicated it to his mother, Noemí Morales. He stated that he wrote it "as a gift for my mom on Mother's Day" and that he thought "the idea of including it on the album was very good". As with his single "Señora De Las Cuatro Decadas" (on 1994's Historias), at first he never thought to include the song on an album. "Caudillo" evokes "the image of some friends" Arjona had at college; he asserted that he "appears constantly there because sometimes we transform ourselves into a contradiction of all those things we fought in those moments. It's the history of a student leader that becomes a president". Arjona dedicated the album to his father, who died in 2011.

== Release and promotion ==
Independiente was first digitally released in some South American countries on 23 September 2011 as a special edition, dubbed the Cono Sur Edition. This version included a different mix of "Reconciliación". On 30 September, the digital download for the standard edition of the album was released in several Latin American and European countries. On 4 October, the album was officially released as a digital download and compact disc in most of these same markets as well as North America; an iTunes edition was released as a digital download on the iTunes music store. This version included an album-only video, entitled "Independiente". In Germany, the album was first available on the Kiwi label on 4 October and on 11 October through Warner Music. In Canada and Spain, the compact-disc version of the album was available on 25 October.

Arjona appeared on a television special in 2011 to promote Independiente. The special featured guest appearances by Gaby Moreno, Ricky Muñoz (of the Mexican band Intocable) and Paquita la del Barrio. Broadcast by Televisa, the program showcased the fourteen songs on Independiente. Muñoz said that he was "happy to do things for Ricardo [Arjona]", elaborating that they met each other "some time ago" and it was "a very special situation". The show was later rebroadcast on 5 November by Canal de las Estrellas.

== Singles ==
The first single from Independiente is "El Amor", released on 23 August 2011. In the United States it reached number one on the Billboard Top Latin Songs chart (Arjona's fourth number one on that chart, following "Desnuda", "Cuando" and "El Problema") and number one on the Billboard Latin Pop Songs chart. It was also a hit in Latin America, reaching number one in Argentina, Mexico, Colombia, Venezuela, Chile, Costa Rica, Panama and Guatemala. The music video for "El Amor", filmed in black-and-white, was released on 8 September 2011. It was directed by Ricardo Calderón (who also directed Arjona's music video for "Como Duele") and filmed in Mexico City. The second single from the album is "Fuiste Tú", a duet with Guatemalan singer Gaby Moreno. The music video for the song was shot in Guatemala (around the tropical areas of Antigua Guatemala, Río Dulce, the Atitlán lake, Semuc Champey and the Tikal ruins) and directed by Argentine director Joaquín Cambre. Arjona commented that "this video recreates the battle on the couple when someone starts to talk 'is the beginning of the end'". "Fuiste Tú" reached number two on the Billboard Top Latin Songs and number one on the Latin Pop Songs charts.

"Mi Novia Se Me Está Poniendo Vieja" was released as the third single. Arjona wrote the song for his mother, Noemí Morales. The music video for the song, released in April 2012, was filmed at Universal Studios in Los Angeles. It features Arjona and his son, Ricardo Arjona Jr., and was directed by Robert García. The song was used by American telecommunications corporation AT&T for a Nokia Lumia 900 smartphone commercial featuring Arjona and was released in music stores in May 2012. The fourth single from the album, "Te Quiero", was released in July 2012. The music video for the song was filmed during Arjona's concerts at Vélez Stadium in Buenos Aires, Argentina during his Metamorfosis World Tour. It marks Arjona's first music video taken from a live performance. The song reached number ten in Mexico and number one on both the Billboard Latin Songs and Latin Pop Songs chart. "Si Tu No Existieras" was released in November 2012 as the set's fifth and final single, and was intended to promote the re-release of the album. The song, which music video was similar to that of "Te Quiero", managed to peak at number 14 in Mexico.

== Tour ==
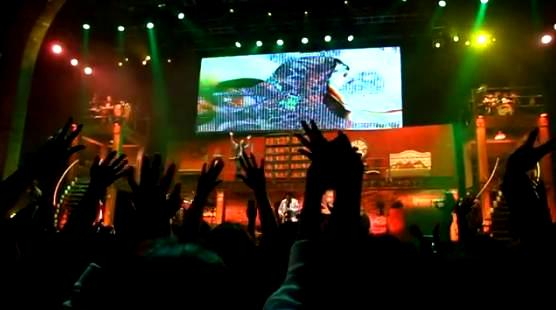
Arjona performing in Santiago de Chile

Beginning on 27 January 2012 in Toluca, Mexico, Arjona embarked on a world tour to promote the album. The Metamorfosis World Tour was announced in December 2011, and visited the Americas. The show consisted of four theatrical sets on a revolving stage; Arjona performed on each in turn, as it related to each song. Fellow Guatemalan singer-songwriter Gaby Moreno appeared in several performances, joining Arjona for "Fuiste Tú". The tour was praised by critics and fans. Natalie Torres of Dia a Dia reported, "Arjona knows how to handle his 'girls', with a mix of attitudes from a 'rough' male and seductive lyrics".

Jon Pareles of The New York Times commented that "Arjona is one of Latin pop's finest lyricists: observant, nuanced, sometimes wry, sometimes melancholy and especially fond of the play of opposites". He added, "unlike some of his fellow Latin pop stars, Mr. Arjona is no saccharine lover boy". The tour broke records for ticket sales, commercial gross and attendance. In Buenos Aires it was the most popular show at José Amalfitani Stadium, with a total attendance of more than 160,000 for four consecutive sold-out concerts. In Guatemala City Arjona was the first artist with two consecutive sold-out concerts at Mateo Flores Stadium, with a combined attendance of more than 50,000. As of October 2012, the tour has been performed for close to one million people in more than eight countries.

== Commercial performance ==
Independiente debuted at the top of the Billboard Top Latin Albums for the week ending 22 October 2011, and remained at that position the following week. It was the third album by Arjona to remain for more than a week at number one, after Galería Caribe (2000) and 5to Piso. Independiente became his fourth chart-topper, following Poquita Ropa (2010). For its third week it fell to number two, replaced by Chino & Nacho's Supremo. The album also debuted at number one on the Latin Pop Albums chart for the week ending 22 October, becoming Arjona's fifth album to do so. It remained at number one the following week; for its third week, it was replaced by Supremo. The album reached number one again for the week ending 12 November, and later for the week ending 11 February 2012. For its second run it remained three weeks at the top before being replaced by Maná's Drama y Luz for a week; for its third run at number one, it remained at the top spot for five weeks. For the week ending 2 June 2012, Independiente returned again to number one.

For the week it debuted atop both the Latin Albums and Latin Pop Albums charts, Independiente also appeared as number 65 on the Billboard 200. It is Arjona's fifth consecutive album to chart on that list (following Adentro, Quién Dijo Ayer, 5to Piso and Poquita Ropa), although it has only charted higher than Adentro. In Mexico, Independiente debuted at number one for the week ending 9 October 2011. The following week it fell to number two, replaced at the top by Espinoza Paz' Canciones Que Duelen. For its third week, the album fell to number three. In Argentina, Independiente debuted at number one for the week ending 9 October 2011; it remained at the top position for a single week, dropping to number five the following week. The album also charted on Spain, reaching number 76. The following week it fell off the chart but later re-entered, reaching its peak at number 68. Independiente is Arjona's fourth album to chart in Spain, following Adentro, 5to Piso and Poquita Ropa. On the 2011 year-end charts, Independiente was the 50th best-selling album on the Latin Albums chart and the 15th best-seller on the Latin Pop Albums chart. In Mexico, it was the 19th best-selling album of 2011.

Independiente was certified platinum by the Argentine Chamber of Phonograms and Videograms Producers in recognition of 40,000 copies sold. It was also certified gold and platinum by the Mexican Association of Producers of Phonograms and Videograms for 90,000 copies shipped. In the United States, Independiente was certified Latin platinum by the Recording Industry Association of America for 100,000 copies shipped. In Venezuela, the album was certified double platinum for more than 40,000 copies sold. It was certified gold in Chile for 5,000 copies shipped, and in Colombia for 10,000 copies sold. As of November 2012, Independiente has sold 75,000 copies in the United States.

== Critical reaction and awards ==
Professional ratings
Review scores
Source	Rating
Allmusic	3.5/5 stars

David Jeffries of Allmusic gave the album a mildly positive review, citing Arjona's return to his more mainstream style after the "stripped-down acoustic effort" Poquita Ropa. He compared (as did Arjona and other critics) the production values and musical style of Independiente with past albums Animal Nocturno and Historias. Finally, he stated that "Returning fans will revel in this combination of freedom and growth, and appreciate the return of producer Tommy Torres, the man who has been behind the boards for quite a few of Arjona's most popular releases" (referring to Torres' absence from the production of Poquita Ropa).

A contributor to the Colombian website CMI commented that "listening to Independiente is a labyrinth to go through, each song is a huge path that seems to have no end, because it involves imagination, it invites you to dream, to charm, to bewitch. But neither leaves behind the problematic requirements of love, its loopholes, hideouts and concerns, as well as its bad times in this joke that's life". Independiente was nominated at the Premios Juventud of 2012 for the "Lo Toco Todo (I Play It All)" award. On 25 September 2012, the album received two nominations at the 13th Annual Latin Grammy Awards: Album of the Year and Best Singer-songwriter album. On 3 December 2012, Independiente received a nomination for "Pop Album of the Year" at the 2013 Premios Lo Nuestro awards. It also received a nomination for Grammy Award for Best Latin Pop Album at the Grammy Awards of 2013. Arjona does not win the latter award since 2005 with Adentro in a shared win with Mexican singer Julieta Venegas. In February 2013, Independiente received a nomination for "Latin Pop Album of the Year" at the Billboard Latin Music Awards of 2013.

== Track listing ==
All tracks are written by Ricardo Arjona, except where noted.

No.	Title	Writer(s)	Producer(s)	Length
1.	"Lo Que Está Bien Está Mal"	Lyrics: Arjona / Music: Dan Warner	Dan Warner	3:44
2.	"Hay Amores"		Arjona, Warner, Lee Levin, Dan Rudin, Tommy Torres	4:18
3.	"A La Medida"		Arjona, Warner, Levin, Rudin	3:42
4.	"El Amor"		Arjona, Warner, Levin, Rudin, Torres	4:49
5.	"Lo Mejor De Lo Peor"		Arjona, Warner, Levin	4:02
6.	"Mi Novia Se Me Está Poniendo Vieja"		Arjona, Warner, Levin, Rudin	5:12
7.	"Te Juro"		Arjona, Warner, Levin, Rudin	3:50
8.	"Fuiste Tú" (featuring Gaby Moreno)		Arjona, Warner, Levin, Rudin, Torres	4:23
9.	"Te Quiero"		Arjona, Warner, Levin	4:38
10.	"Si Tú No Existieras"		Arjona, Warner, Levin	4:01
11.	"Reconciliación"		Arjona, Warner, Levin, Julio Chávez	5:04
12.	"Se Fue"		Arjona, Warner, Levin, Rudin	4:45
13.	"Caudillo"		Arjona, Victor Patrón	5:00
14.	"Mi Novia Se Me Está Poniendo Vieja" (Piano Version)		Arjona, Patrón	5:02

iTunes Store Bonus Track
No.	Title	Length
15.	"Independiente"	3:31

Cono Sur Version
No.	Title	Length
1.	"Lo Que Está Bien Está Mal"	3:43
2.	"Hay Amores"	4:19
3.	"A La Medida"	3:45
4.	"El Amor"	4:47
5.	"Lo Mejor De Lo Peor"	4:03
6.	"Mi Novia Se Me Está Poniendo Vieja"	5:12
7.	"Te Juro"	3:52
8.	"Fuiste Tú" (featuring Gaby Moreno)	4:25
9.	"Te Quiero"	4:38
10.	"Si Tu No Existieras"	4:02
11.	"Reconciliación" (Cono Sur version)	5:05
12.	"Se Fue"	4:47
13.	"Caudillo"	5:07
14.	"Mi Novia Se Me Está Poniendo Vieja" (Piano Version)	5:05

+ Demos
No.	Title	Length
1.	"Fuiste Tú" (featuring Vicky Echeverri)	6:02
2.	"El Amor"	6:53
3.	"Caudillo"	4:57
4.	"Hay Amores"	3:43
5.	"Mi Novia Se Está Poniendo Vieja"	5:09
6.	"Te Quiero"	5:32
7.	"Te Juro"	3:28
8.	"Si Tú No Existieras"	4:12
9.	"Lo Que Está Bien Está Mal" (instrumental)	3:30
10.	"Se Fue"	4:52
11.	"A La Medida"	3:20
12.	"Lo mejor De Lo Peor"	3:41

== Personnel ==
Credits are taken from Independiente liner notes.

- Paul Abbot – viola
- Monisa Angell – viola
- Ricardo Arjona – composer, chorus, lyrics
- Richard Bravo – percussion
- Carlos "Junior" Cabral – arrangements
- Ricardo Cortés – drums
- Monica del Aguila – cello
- Roger Hudson – chorus
- James Grosjean – viola
- Anthony LaMarchina – cello
- Elizabeth Lamb – viola
- Lee Levin – arrangement, drums, percussion
- Chris Macdonald – direction
- Victor Patron – piano
- Matt Rollings – Hammond B3, organ, piano, Wurlitzer
- Julia Tanner – piano
- David Thoener – mixing
- Tommy Torres – chorus
- Peter Wallace – Hammond B3, organo, Wurlitzer
- Dan Warner – arrangement, banjo, composer, ukulele
- Ben Wisch – mixing
- Xarah – Pro Tools

== Chart performance ==
=== Weekly charts ===
Chart (2011)	Peak position
Argentine Albums (CAPIF)	1
Mexican Albums (Top 100 Mexico)	1
Spanish Albums (Promusicae)	68
Peruan Albums (Phaton Records)	4
Uruguayan Albums (CUD)	6
US Top Latin Albums (Billboard)	1
US Latin Pop Albums (Billboard)	1
US Billboard 200	65
Venezuelan Albums (Recordland)	1

=== Year-end charts ===
Chart (2011)	Position
Argentine Albums (CAPIF)	6
Mexican Albums (Top 100 Mexico)	19
US Top Latin Albums (Billboard)	50
US Latin Pop Albums (Billboard)	15
Chart (2012)	Position
Argentine Albums (CAPIF)	3
US Top Latin Albums (Billboard)	6
US Latin Pop Albums (Billboard)	1
Chart (2013)	Position
Argentinian Albums (CAPIF)	93
US Top Latin Albums	57

== Certifications ==
Region	Certification	Certified units/sales
Argentina (CAPIF)	2× Platinum	80,000^{x}
Chile (IFPI)	Platinum	10,000^{^}
Colombia (ACPF)	Platinum	10,000^{x}
Mexico (AMPROFON)	2× Platinum	120,000^{^}
United States (RIAA)	Platinum (Latin)	100,000^{^}
Venezuela (APFV)	4× Platinum	40,000^{x}
^{^} Shipments figures based on certification alone.

== Release history ==
Country	Date	Format(s)	Label	Edition(s)
Argentina	23 September 2011	Digital download	Metamorfosis / Warner Music	Cono Sur Edition
Chile	23 September 2011	Digital download	Metamorfosis / Warner Music	Cono Sur Edition
Ecuador	23 September 2011	Digital download	Metamorfosis / Warner Music	Cono Sur Edition
Peru	23 September 2011	Digital download	Metamorfosis / Warner Music	Cono Sur Edition
United Kingdom	23 September 2011	Digital download	Metamorfosis / Warner Music	Standard
Argentina	30 September 2011	Digital download	Metamorfosis / Warner Music	Standard
Belgium	30 September 2011	Digital download	Metamorfosis / Warner Music	Standard
Chile	30 September 2011	Digital download	Metamorfosis / Warner Music	Standard
Colombia	30 September 2011	Digital download	Metamorfosis / Warner Music	Standard
Costa Rica	30 September 2011	Digital download	Metamorfosis / Warner Music	Standard
Ecuador	30 September 2011	Digital download	Metamorfosis / Warner Music	Standard
Ireland	30 September 2011	Digital download	Metamorfosis / Warner Music	Standard
Italy	30 September 2011	Digital download	Metamorfosis / Warner Music	Standard
Peru	30 September 2011	Digital download	Metamorfosis / Warner Music	Standard
Portugal	30 September 2011	Digital download	Metamorfosis / Warner Music	Standard
United Kingdom	30 September 2011	Digital download	Metamorfosis / Warner Music	Standard
Canada	4 October 2011	Digital download	Metamorfosis / Warner Music	Standard, iTunes Edition
Spain	4 October 2011	Digital download	Metamorfosis / Warner Music	Standard, iTunes Edition
Argentina	4 October 2011	CD, digital download	Metamorfosis / Warner Music	Standard, iTunes Edition
Brasil	4 October 2011	CD, digital download	Metamorfosis / Warner Music	Standard, iTunes Edition
Chile	4 October 2011	CD, digital download	Metamorfosis / Warner Music	Standard, iTunes Edition
Colombia	4 October 2011	CD, digital download	Metamorfosis / Warner Music	Standard, iTunes Edition
Costa Rica	4 October 2011	CD, digital download	Metamorfosis / Warner Music	Standard, iTunes Edition
Ecuador	4 October 2011	CD, digital download	Metamorfosis / Warner Music	Standard, iTunes Edition
Mexico	4 October 2011	CD, digital download	Metamorfosis / Warner Music	Standard, iTunes Edition
Paraguay	4 October 2011	CD, digital download	Metamorfosis / Warner Music	Standard, iTunes Edition
United States	4 October 2011	CD, digital download	Metamorfosis / Warner Music	Standard, iTunes Edition
Venezuela	4 October 2011	CD, digital download	Metamorfosis / Warner Music	Standard, iTunes Edition
Germany	4 October 2011	CD	Kiwi	Standard
France	4 October 2011	CD	Metamorfosis / Warner Music	Standard
United Kingdom	4 October 2011	CD	Metamorfosis / Warner Music	Standard
Italy	4 October 2011	CD	Metamorfosis / Warner Music	Standard
Germany	11 October 2011	CD	Metamorfosis / Warner Music	Standard
Canada	25 October 2011	CD	Warner Special Imports	Standard
Spain	25 October 2011	CD	Warner Music Spain	Standard

== See also ==
- 2011 in Latin music
- List of number-one Billboard Latin Albums from the 2010s
- List of number-one Billboard Latin Pop Albums from the 2010s
- List of number-one albums of 2011 (Mexico)
- Ricardo Arjona discography
