= Te Quiero (Ricardo Arjona song) =

Single by Ricardo Arjona

from the album Independiente
- Released: 5 July 2012
- Recorded: 2011
- Genre: Pop rock
- Length: 4:38
- Label: Metamorfosis, Warner Music
- Songwriter: Ricardo Arjona
- Producers: Ricardo Arjona, Dan Warner, Lee Levin

Ricardo Arjona singles chronology
"Mi Novia Se Me Está Poniendo Vieja" (2012)	"Te Quiero" (2012)	"Mientras Tanto" (2012)

"Te Quiero" is a Latin pop song by Guatemalan recording artist Ricardo Arjona, released on 5 July 2012 as the third single from his 13th studio album, Independiente (2011). The song was written by Arjona, who produced it with longtime collaborators Dan Warner and Lee Levin under their stage name Los Gringos. Additional recording work was handled by Peter Wallace, Matt Rollings, Carlos "Cabral" Junior and Isaías García.

The song became Arjona's fifth single to reach number one on the US Billboard Top Latin Songs, his ninth to do so on the Latin Pop Songs chart and third on Latin Tropical Airplay. It also charted at No.10 on the Billboard Mexican Airplay chart. An accompanying music video for "Te Quiero" was released in June 2012. It was directed by Gabriel Blanco and filmed during Arjona's concert shows at the José Amalfitani Stadium in Buenos Aires, Argentina, as part of his Metamorfosis World Tour, and marks the first time Arjona releases a music video recorded from his live performances while on tour.

== Background ==
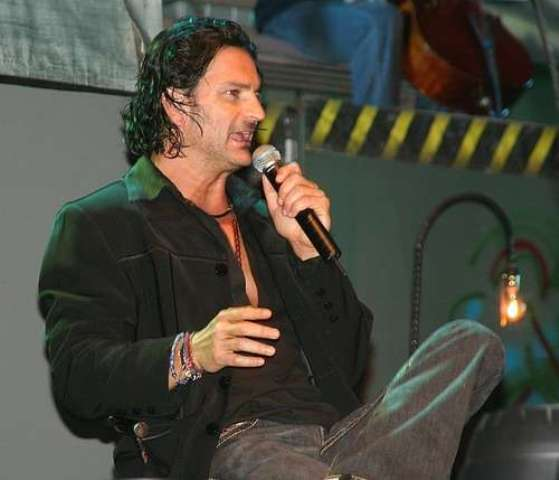
In 2011, Arjona founded his own record label, Metamorfosis.

Independiente is the first album Arjona released as an independent artist, and through his own record label, Metamorfosis, a company he created to refocus his career. Presided by Arjona and some friends, Metamorfosis is based in Miami and Mexico City, and also includes the photographer and director Ricardo Calderón, Universal Music México's executive Humberto Calderon and BMG's Miriam Sommerz. Although the album is marketed with the new label, distribution was handled by Warner Music. Arjona commented many times, that he considered the way he decided to go independent raised more compromise than freedom, saying that "Inside the word 'Independent', even when it sounds like extreme freedom, there's a big amount of compromise and the responsibility of being able to administrate, in the best way possible, such independence."

Independiente was composed and written within one year, and marks the fourth time Arjona had collaborated with Tommy Torres, who had helped writing, composing, producing and providing backing vocals. The other three albums in which the two artists had worked together are Quién Dijo Ayer, in which Torres helped producing the singles "Quién" and "Quiero", and offering additional work on the new versions of Arjona's hits; 5to Piso, and Adentro, respectively. Also, in the album, Arjona returned to his classic and trademark sound, which Torres has helped crafting it since six years now, after the drastic change he made in Poquita Ropa. On that album, the artist made use of the fewest instruments possible, simplifying his sound, and introducing what he called a "stripped-down acoustic effort" of his music.

Weeks before the release of Independiente, Arjona issued a letter in which he talked about his past relations with recording companies. In the letter, he revealed that he entered in his first record label as an exchange, commenting that "a producer, friend of mine, told them [the record label] that if they don't sign me they won't sign two artists he had [at that time]", and that he received the "minimum royalty percentage" out from his most successful albums. Billboard notes that although other groups have decided to launch independently their works after having a contract with major record labels, Arjona is by far the most important artist in the Latin pop to follow this trend.

== Composition ==
"Te Quiero" (Live)
A 22-second sample of the live version of "Te Quiero", released alongside the standard version on the single release and used on the music video for the song. The sample showcases the first verse, as sung by Arjona and the public present at the concert.

"Te Quiero" is a latin pop song written and produced by Arjona, alongside longtime collaborators Dan Warner and Lee Levin under their stagename Los Gringos. Roger Hudson provided additional background vocals for the song, and Matt Rollings, Peter Wallace, Carlos "Cabral" Junior and Isaías García served as recording engineers, along with Warner and Levin. "Te Quiero" was mixed by David Thoener in The Blue Grotto at Nashville, Tennessee and mastered by Tom Coyne in Sterling Sound at New York City.

The song's composition is heavily based on drums and guitars, along with additional Hammond B-3, bass and percussion elements. David Jeffries from Allmusic, on his review of Independiente, stated that the song "builds into a full-band rave-up during its choruses." A live version of "Te Quiero" was made and used on the music video for the song, and was included on the single release.

== Promotion ==
=== Music video ===
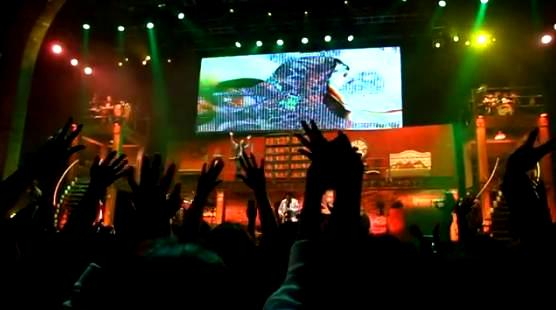
Arjona performed "Te Quiero" alongside new songs and past hits on his Metamorfosis World Tour, as well as on a program broadcast by Televisa in 2011.

The music video for "Te Quiero" was released on 20 June 2012. The clip was filmed during Arjona's concert shows at the José Amalfitani Stadium in Buenos Aires, Argentina, as part of his Metamorfosis World Tour. The video was directed by Gabriel Blanco and was produced by Tamir Lotan. This is the first time Arjona releases a music video recorded from his live performances while on tour. The clip starts showing behind the scenes shots of Arjona, his team and his fans while the song begins to play. Then, it shows the singer on stage singing the song in front of the public at the Velez Stadium, interpolated with shots from people during the performance singing the song. The live version of the song used on the clip was included on the single release of the song. As of 14 August 2012, the video has reached 2.1 million views on YouTube.

=== Live performances ===
"Te Quiero" was in the set list for a televised program in 2011. The special included guest singers such as Gaby Moreno, Ricky Muñoz (from Mexican band Intocable) and Paquita la del Barrio. Broadcast by Televisa, the program was made to showcast the new fourteen songs included on Independiente. Ricky Muñoz commented that he was "happy to do things for Ricardo [Arjona]" and elaborated that they met each other "some time ago" and that it was "a very special situation." The show was later broadcast on 5 November 2011 by Canal de las Estrellas.

== Track listing ==
- Digital download
1. "Te Quiero" – 4:38
2. "Te Quiero" (Live) – 4:56

== Credits and personnel ==
Credits are taken from Independiente liner notes.

- Ricardo Arjona – Producer, lyrics, lead vocals
- Roger Hudson – Background vocals
- Dan Warner – Bass, guitars, additional programming, recording engineer
- Lee Levin – Drums, percussion, recording engineer
- Matt Rollings – Recording engineer
- David Thoener – Mixing engineer
- Peter Wallace – Hammond B-3, recording engineer
- Carlos "Cabral" Junior – Recording engineer
- Isaías Garcia – Recording engineer

== Charts ==
Chart (2012)	Peak position
Honduras (Honduras Top 50)	32
Mexico (Billboard International)	10
US Hot Latin Songs (Billboard)	1
US Latin Pop Airplay (Billboard)	1
US Tropical Airplay (Billboard)	1

== See also ==
- List of Billboard Hot Latin Songs and Latin Airplay number ones of 2012

== Release history ==
Country	Date	Format	Label
United States	5 July 2012	Digital download	Metamorfosis / Warner Music
Mexico	5 July 2012	Digital download	Metamorfosis / Warner Music
Argentina	5 July 2012	Digital download	Metamorfosis / Warner Music
Chile	5 July 2012	Digital download	Metamorfosis / Warner Music
Venezuela	5 July 2012	Digital download	Metamorfosis / Warner Music
