= El Amor (Ricardo Arjona song) =

Single by Ricardo Arjona

from the album Independiente
- Released: 23 August 2011
- Recorded: 2011
- Genre: Latin pop
- Length: 4:49
- Label: Metamorfosis
- Songwriter: Ricardo Arjona
- Producers: Ricardo Arjona; Dan Warner; Lee Levin; Tommy Torres

Ricardo Arjona singles chronology
| "Marta" (2011) | "El Amor" (2011) | "Fuiste Tú" (2012) |

"El Amor" is a latin pop song by Guatemalan recording artist Ricardo Arjona, released on 23 August 2011 as the lead single from his thirteenth studio album, Independiente (2011). The song was written and produced by Arjona along with longtime collaborators Dan Warner and Lee Levin under their stage name Los Gringos, with additional production work from Puerto Rican singer-songwriter Tommy Torres. "El Amor" is the first single Arjona releases under his new record label, Metamorfosis.

Lyrically, "El Amor" was written by Arjona in an attempt to show all sides of love, explaining that "So many good things about love has been shown, that somebody had to turn it around and tell the bad ones". The song became Arjona's fourth single to reach number one on the US Billboard Top Latin Songs, and the seventh to do so on the Latin Pop Songs chart. It also became his first song ever to reach number one on the Tropical Songs chart, improving his previous peak of number two almost twelve years prior. "El Amor" also topped several national charts from Latin America.

An accompanying music video for "El Amor" was released in September 2011. It was directed by Ricardo Calderón and filmed in black and white. The clip shows Arjona singing while a wedding is being celebrated inside a chapel. "El Amor" was performed by Arjona as part of a televised show broadcast by Televisa, which included guest appearances by Gaby Moreno, Ricky Muñoz from Mexican band Intocable and Paquita la del Barrio. It was also included on the set list for his ongoing tour, the Metamorfosis World Tour.

== Background ==
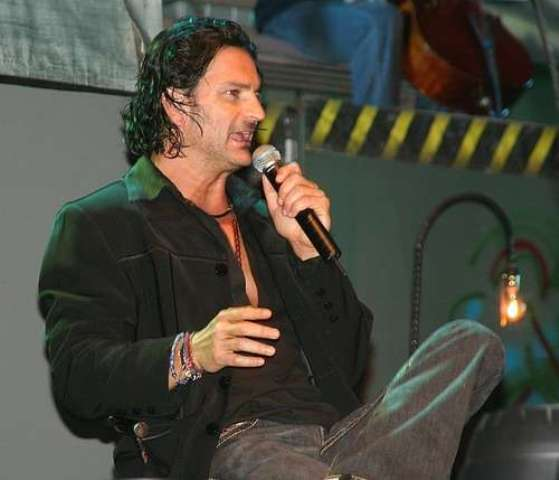
In 2011, Arjona founded his own record label, Metamorfosis. "El Amor" is the first single released under the label.

Independiente is the first album Arjona released as an independent artist, and through his own record label, Metamorfosis, a company he created to refocus his career. Presided by Arjona and some friends, Metamorfosis is based in Miami and Mexico City, and also includes the photographer and director Ricardo Calderón, Universal Music México's executive Humberto Calderon and BMG's Miriam Sommerz. Although the album is marketed with the new label, distribution was handled by Warner Music. Arjona commented many times, that he considered the way he decided to go independent raised more compromise than freedom, saying that "Inside the word 'Independent', even when it sounds like extreme freedom, there's a big amount of compromise and the responsibility of being able to administrate, in the best way possible, such independence."

Independiente was composed and written within one year, and marks the fourth time Arjona had collaborated with Tommy Torres, who had helped writing, composing, producing and providing backing vocals. The other three albums in which the two artists had worked together are Quién Dijo Ayer, in which Torres helped producing the singles "Quién" and "Quiero", and offering additional work on the new versions of Arjona's hits; 5to Piso, and Adentro, respectively. Also, in the album, Arjona returned to his classic and trademark sound, which Torres has helped crafting it since six years now, after the drastic change he made in Poquita Ropa. On that album, the artist made use of the fewest instruments possible, simplifying his sound, and introducing what he called a "stripped-down version of his music".

Weeks before the release of Independiente, Arjona issued a letter in which he talked about his past relations with recording companies. In the letter, he revealed that he entered in his first record label as an exchange, commenting that "a producer, friend of mine, told them [the record label] that if they don't sign me they won't sign two artists he had [at that time]", and that he received the "minimum royalty percentage" out from his most successful albums. Billboard notes that although other groups have decided to launch independently their works after having a contract with major record labels, Arjona is by far the most important artist in the Latin pop to follow this trend.

== Composition ==
"El Amor" is a piano and guitar mid-tempo Latin pop ballad written by Arjona and produced by himself alongside longtime collaborators Dan Warner, Lee Levin and Tommy Torres. Recording work was held by Torres, alongside Carlos "Junior" Cabral, Isaias García, Jerald Romero and Dan Rudin. The song is the first lead single to be produced by Arjona along with Torres since 5to Piso's "Como Duele" back in 2008. Poquita Ropa's lead single, "Puente" (2010), was produced by Arjona and Dan Warner. Torres also provided background vocals on the song.

"El Amor" was written by Arjona in an attempt to show all sides of love. As said by Arjona himself, "So many good things about love has been shown, that somebody had to turn it around and tell the bad ones". The development of "El Amor" was motivated by Arjona's idea of showing "those big dark events within love that nobody talk about", saying that "love's dark sides are really fundamental to understand its great value".

In an interview in February 2012, the singer stated that "El Amor" was the "most tawdry" song he has released throughout his career. He further added that the fact that they chose the song was a "contradiction" because it was not "the song which could better represent the entire album." He also added that the song was "very strong" and "a bit dark". The song marks the return of the signature and more mainstream sound of Arjona on a music basis, after the multi-genre and politically charged Poquita Ropa's lead single, "Puente", which failed to make impact on the United States and only managed to reach No. 36 on the Latin Pop Songs chart.

== Chart performance ==
In the United States, "El Amor" became Arjona's first top ten single in the Billboard Top Latin Songs since "Sin Ti... Sin Mi" in 2008 and the first to chart there since "Tocando Fondo" in 2009. The song also restored Arjona's chart success, after the Poquita Ropa era, on which none of the three singles released off the album managed to attain chart success, and eventually only one appeared on any chart. The song finally reached number one position on the list, becoming his fourth chart-topper, and the first to do so since "El Problema", ten years prior. On the Latin Pop Songs chart, "El Amor" became Arjona's seventh song to reach the top spot of the chart, and the first to do so since "Como Duele" in 2008. Also, "El Amor" became his first song ever to reach number one on the Tropical Songs chart, breaking his previous record held by "Cuando", which reached number two twelve years prior, in 2000. In Venezuela, "El Amor" reached a peak of number five. It also reached number six on Mexico. The song also became a hit in the rest Latin America, reaching number one in Argentina, Colombia, Chile, Costa Rica, Panama and Guatemala. On the Billboard year-end charts for 2011, "El Amor" finished at number 73 on the Top Latin Songs chart. The song also finished within the top fifty songs on the Latin Pop Songs and Tropical Songs charts, appearing at number 41 and number 44, respectively.

== Release and promotion ==
"El Amor" was released as the first single from Independiente on 23 August 2011 in Canada, United States and Mexico as a digital download through the iTunes Store. The single was later made available on the rest of Latin America and some European countries such as the United Kingdom, Spain, Germany and France on 6 September 2011. "El Amor" is the first single Arjona released under his recently founded record label, Metamorfosis.

=== Music video ===
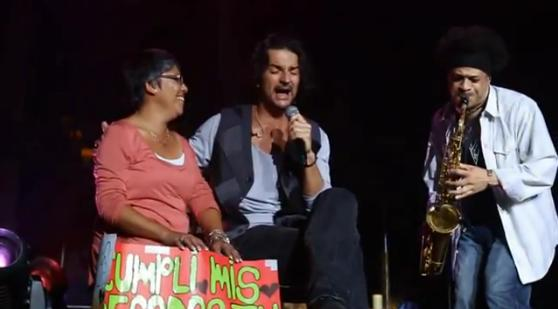
Arjona performed "El Amor" alongside new songs and past hits on his Metamorfosis World Tour, as well as on a program broadcast by Televisa in 2011.

Ricardo Arjona released on 8 September 2011 the music video for "El Amor". It debuted on Arjona's official website, and then was sent to music channels around United States and Latin America. The clip was shot in Mexico City and was filmed entirely in black-and-white. The music video was directed by Ricardo Calderón, who has also directed the music video for Arjona's 2008 single "Como Duele". Calderón also produced the video, as well as developing the story and design. Before releasing the video, the singer launched a contest on his website that consisted on uploading to his official YouTube account videos related to the song, and the winner received a trip to Argentina to meet him.

The clip starts with a bride reaching, on a limousine, the chapel on which she's about to get married. As she is shown walking inside the chapel's doors, Arjona starts to sing while sit on the chairs in the empty chapel. Then, the bride is shown again alongside the groom in the altar, ready to make the vows, while the chapel is filled with the invitees. Then, scenes of Arjona playing the piano and singing, and scenes of the ceremony are interpolated, showing the behaviour of the invitees. Later, the invitees are shown involved in discussions and fights while Arjona keeps singing the chorus and verses of the song. As the fights between the invitees increase, the groom rejects the bride and she, stunned, escapes from the chapel. Then, it is shown that all was an illusion from the bride, and they are shown exiting the chapel, married. As of 11 July 2012, the video has reached 14 million views on YouTube.

=== Live performances ===
"El Amor" was in the set list for a televised program in 2011. The special included guest singers such as Gaby Moreno, Ricky Muñoz (from Mexican band Intocable) and Paquita la del Barrio. Broadcast by Televisa, the program was made to showcast the new fourteen songs included on Independiente. Ricky Muñoz commented that he was "happy to do things for Ricardo [Arjona]" and elaborated that the met each other "some time ago" and that it was "a very special situation." The show was later bordcasted on 5 November 2011 by Canal de las Estrellas. The song is also present on his ongoing Metamorfosis World Tour. It is performed while on the first of the four ambiences on the concert, alongside "Lo Que Está Bien Está Mal", "Animal Nocturno", "Hay Amores" and "Desnuda".

== Credits and personnel ==
Credits are taken from Independiente liner notes.

- Ricardo Arjona – chorus
- Dan Warner – bass, guitar, recording engineering
- Lee Levin – drums, percussion, recording engineering
- Matt Rollings – piano, Hammond B3, recording engineering
- Tommy Torres – chorus, recording engineering
- Chris MacDonald – arrangement, directing
- Pamela Sixfin – violin
- David Angell – violin, viola
- Connie Ellisor – violin
- Mary Katherine VanOsdale – violin
- Karen Winkelmann – violin
- Carolyn Bailey – violin
- Erin Hall – violin
- Zeneba Bowers – violin
- Cornelia Heard – violin
- James Grosjean – viola
- Elizabeth Lamb – viola
- Anthony LaMarchina – cello
- Julia Tanner – cello
- Craig Nelson – bass
- Carlos "Junior" Cabral – recording engineering
- Isaias García – recording engineering
- Jerald Romero – recording engineering
- Dan Rudin – recording engineering
- David Thoener – mixing

== Trackslisting ==
- Digital Download
1. "El Amor" – 4:47
- Remix featuring O'Neill
1. "El Amor" (featuring O'Neill) – 4:02

== Charts ==
=== Weekly charts ===
| Chart (2011) | Peak position |
|---|---|
| Mexico (Monitor Latino) | 6 |
| Mexico (Billboard International) | 7 |
| US Hot Latin Songs (Billboard) | 1 |
| US Latin Pop Airplay (Billboard) | 1 |
| US Tropical Airplay (Billboard) | 1 |
| Venezuela Top Latino (Record Report) | 4 |

=== Yearly charts ===
| Chart (2011) | Peak position |
|---|---|
| US Latin Songs (Billboard) | 73 |
| US Latin Pop Songs (Billboard) | 41 |
| US Tropical Songs (Billboard) | 44 |

== Certifications ==
| Region | Certification | Certified units/sales |
|---|---|---|
| Mexico (AMPROFON) | Gold | 30,000^{*} |
^{*} Sales figures based on certification alone.

== Release history ==
Digital releases
| Country | Date | Format | Label |
|---|---|---|---|
| Canada | 23 August 2011 | Digital download | Metamorfosis / Warner Music |
| United States | 23 August 2011 | Digital download | Metamorfosis / Warner Music |
| Mexico | 23 August 2011 | Digital download | Metamorfosis / Warner Music |
| Spain | 6 September 2011 | Digital download | Metamorfosis / Warner Music |
| United Kingdom | 6 September 2011 | Digital download | Metamorfosis / Warner Music |
| France | 6 September 2011 | Digital download | Metamorfosis / Warner Music |
| Argentina | 6 September 2011 | Digital download | Metamorfosis / Warner Music |
| Germany | 6 September 2011 | Digital download | Metamorfosis / Warner Music |
| Venezuela | 6 September 2011 | Digital download | Metamorfosis / Warner Music |
| Chile | 6 September 2011 | Digital download | Metamorfosis / Warner Music |
| Portugal | 6 September 2011 | Digital download | Metamorfosis / Warner Music |
| Brazil | 6 September 2011 | Digital download | Metamorfosis / Warner Music |
| Italy | 6 September 2011 | Digital download | Metamorfosis / Warner Music |
