= Dan Warner (musician) =

American musician (1970–2019)

- Born: Daniel Lawrence Warner; April 22, 1970; South Florida, U.S.
- Died: September 4, 2019 (aged 49) Hollywood, Florida, U.S.
- Genres: Pop rock, house, punk, soul
- Occupations: Guitarist, songwriter, record producer

Daniel Lawrence Warner (April 22, 1970 – September 4, 2019) was an American Grammy Award and Latin Grammy Award winning guitarist, record producer and songwriter.

== Early life and career ==
Warner was born and grew up in South Florida. He recorded with numerous artists and musicians, including Michael Jackson, Ricardo Arjona, Gaby Moreno, Carlos Rivera, Shakira, Madonna, Celine Dion, Barbra Streisand, and Barry Gibb, and wrote for artists including Enrique Iglesias, Lil Wayne and Mika. He was the governor of The Recording Academy starting from 2005 and was the President of Recording Academy Florida Chapter from 2010 to 2012, and a Trustee for the period from 2013 until 2017.

== Awards and recognition ==
During his career, Warner worked on five Grammy Award-winning projects. Warner received a Grammy for Best Latin Pop album for his work as a producer and engineer on Alejandro Sanz's 2009 album at the 53rd Grammy awards, and received four Latin Grammy awards for his work on Calle13's album, Entren Los Que Quieran, Amaury Gutierrez's Sesiones Intimas, Diego Torres's Distinto and the aforementioned Paraíso Express.

== Death ==
Warner died on September 4, 2019, at the age of 49 in Hollywood, Florida, of a heart attack.
