= Fuiste Tú =

Single by Ricardo Arjona and Gaby Moreno

from the album Independiente
- Released: 7 February 2012
- Recorded: 2011
- Genre: Latin pop
- Length: 4:25
- Label: Metamorfosis
- Songwriter: Ricardo Arjona
- Producers: Ricardo Arjona, Dan Warner, Lee Levin

Ricardo Arjona and Gaby Moreno singles chronology
"El Amor" (2011)	"Fuiste Tú" (2012)	"Mi Novia Se Me Está Poniendo Vieja" (2012)

"Fuiste Tú" ("It was you") is a Latin pop song by Guatemalan recording artist Ricardo Arjona, released on 7 February 2012 as the second single from his thirteenth studio album, Independiente (2011). Featuring additional lead vocals by Guatemalan singer Gaby Moreno, the song was written by Arjona, who produced it with longtime collaborators Dan Warner and Lee Levin under their stage name Los Gringos. Additional work on the recording was done by Puerto Rican singer-songwriter Tommy Torres.

Lyrically, "Fuiste Tú" rounds the concept of recreating "the battle on a couple when someone starts to say 'is the beginning of the end'". The song became the second consecutive single from Independiente to reach the top ten in the US Billboard Top Latin Songs, and the second single from the album to top both the Latin Pop Songs and Tropical Songs charts. "Fuiste Tú" performed well on several national charts from Latin America, including reaching No. 1 on Venezuela, and No. 6 on Mexico. The single was nominated for Song of the Year and Record of the Year at the 13th Annual Latin Grammy Awards.

An accompanying music video was released in February 2012. It was directed by Joaquín Cambré and filmed in Guatemala, and features several tropical locations from the country, including Antigua Guatemala, Río Dulce, Lake Atitlán, Semuc Champey and the Tikal ruins. Arjona commented that he chose to film the video there because he wanted to "show the real situation of that department", which is one of the poorest in the country, although being visited yearly by thousands of tourists. As of January 2021, the video has received over 900 million views on YouTube.

== Background ==
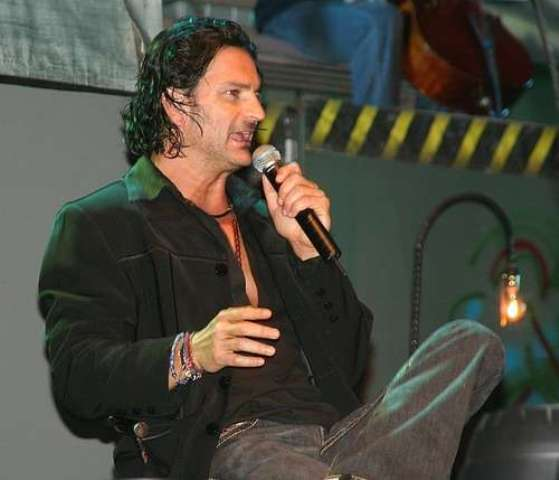
In 2011, Arjona founded his own record label, Metamorfosis.

Independiente is the first album Arjona released as an independent artist, and through his own record label, Metamorfosis, a company he created to refocus his career. Presided by Arjona and some friends, Metamorfosis is based in Miami and Mexico City, and also includes the photographer and director Ricardo Calderón, Universal Music México's executive Humberto Calderon and BMG's Miriam Sommerz. Although the album is marketed with the new label, distribution was handled by Warner Music. Arjona commented many times, that he considered the way he decided to go independent raised more compromise than freedom, saying that "Inside the word 'Independent', even when it sounds like extreme freedom, there's a big amount of compromise and the responsibility of being able to administrate, in the best way possible, such independence."

Independiente was composed and written within one year, and marks the fourth time Arjona had collaborated with Tommy Torres, who had helped writing, composing, producing and providing backing vocals. The other three albums in which the two artists had worked together are Quién Dijo Ayer, in which Torres helped producing the singles "Quién" and "Quiero", and offering additional work on the new versions of Arjona's hits; 5to Piso, and Adentro, respectively. Also, in the album, Arjona returned to his classic and trademark sound, which Torres has helped crafting it since six years now, after the drastic change he made in Poquita Ropa. On that album, the artist made use of the fewest instruments possible, simplifying his sound, and introducing what he called a "stripped-down acoustic effort" of his music.

Weeks before the release of Independiente, Arjona issued a letter in which he talked about his past relations with recording companies. In the letter, he revealed that he entered in his first record label as an exchange, commenting that "a producer, friend of mine, told them [the record label] that if they don't sign me they won't sign two artists he had [at that time]", and that he received the "minimum royalty percentage" out from his most successful albums. Billboard notes that although other groups have decided to launch independently their works after having a contract with major record labels, Arjona is by far the most important artist in the Latin pop to follow this trend.

== Composition ==
"Fuiste Tú" is a latin pop song written by Arjona and including additional lead vocals by Guatemalan singer-songwriter Gaby Moreno. The song was produced by Arjona, alongside longtime collaborators Dan Warner and Lee Levin, with additional recording work by Puerto Rican singer-songwriter Tommy Torres. The composition of the song is driven by the use of piano, violin, as well as guitars, drums and percussion.

Arjona commented that he was happy about collaborating with Moreno, stating that "we had the possibilities to record this song with very well known people, but the possibilities of doing it with her, for me, is a celebration." He further said that Moreno was an "incredibly talented woman", calling her a "countrywoman" and a "fantastic human being". He also named "Fuiste Tú" one of the most important songs on the album.

== Chart performance ==
In the United States, "Fuiste Tú" became Arjona's second consecutive top ten single on the US Billboard Top Latin Songs since "Como Duele" and "Sin Ti... Sin Mi" back in 2008, and is also the second top ten single from Independiente on that chart. The song reached its peak of number two on the week ending 28 April 2012, after jumping from number 13, and was kept away from the number one position by Michel Teló's "Ai se eu te pego". In the Latin Pop Songs chart, "Fuiste Tú" became his second chart-topper, reaching number one position on the week ending 10 March 2012. This achievement made Independiente the only album by Arjona to have more than one song reach number one on that list. "Fuiste Tú" also became Arjona's second consecutive number-one single in the Tropical Songs chart. In Mexico, the song managed to reach number six on the Billboard International Mexican chart, and number 15 on the Monitor Latino's Top 20 Pop chart. "Fuiste Tú" also reached number 15 in Colombia, and number one in Venezuela's Record Report Top 100 and Top Latino charts.

== Promotion ==
=== Music video ===
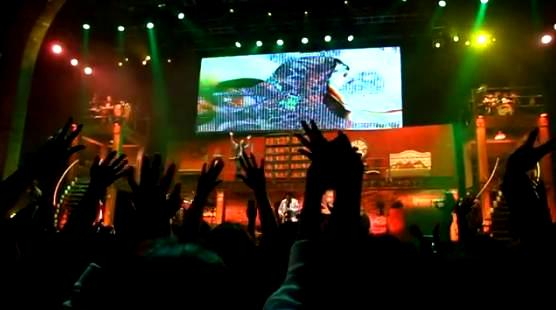
Arjona performed "Fuiste Tú" alongside new songs and past hits on his Metamorfosis World Tour, as well as on a program broadcast by Televisa in 2011.

Ricardo Arjona released on 9 February 2012 the music video for "Fuiste Tú". Filmed in December 2011, the clip was directed by Joaquín Cambré, was shot in Guatemala, and features several tropical locations from the country, including Antigua Guatemala, Río Dulce, the Atitlán lake, Semuc Champey and the Tikal ruins. Some of those locations belong to the Sololá, and the singer revealed that he chose to film the video there because he wanted to "show the real situation of that department", which is one of the poorest in the country, although being visited yearly by thousands of tourists. About the concept of the video, Arjona commented that "it recreates the battle on a couple when someone starts to say 'is the beginning of the end'. When there is something you don't like from your beloved one, there's two options: The first, hold on to the relationship. The second, go away. Sadly, there's a third one that is created by those who are unsure and that is when, on the conflictive moments, they use a recurrent phrase: It was you."

The clip starts showing Gaby Moreno playing a melody in a guitar while staying close to a window, watching the people walk on the street below. Meanwhile, scenes of all the places featured on the video are interpolated. Just as the song begins, Arjona is shown leaving the Tikal ruins on an orange Jeep, as well as images of Moreno singing in front of a piano. Then, as Arjona abandons the Jeep and goes as a passenger on another vehicle, Moreno is shown singing inside a house, close to another Jeep similar to that of Arjona's. Finally, Arjona reaches the town on which Moreno has been waiting for him, just to find that she is gone to where he has been before, on the Tikal ruins. As of June 2023, the video has received over 1.1 billion views on YouTube.

=== Live performances ===
"Fuiste Tú" was in the set list for a televised program in 2011. The special included guest singers such as Gaby Moreno (with whom Arjona played the song), Ricky Muñoz (from Mexican band Intocable) and Paquita la del Barrio. Broadcast by Televisa, the program was made to showcast the new fourteen songs included on Independiente. Ricky Muñoz commented that he was "happy to do things for Ricardo [Arjona]" and elaborated that the met each other "some time ago" and that it was "a very special situation." The show was later bordcasted on 5 November 2011 by Canal de las Estrellas. The song is also present on his ongoing Metamorfosis World Tour. It is performed while on one of the ambiences the concert, alongside "Reconciliación", "Tarde (Sin Daños a Terceros)", "Te Conozco" and "Si El Norte Fuera El Sur".

== Track listing ==
- Digital download
1. "Fuiste Tú" (featuring Gaby Moreno) – 4:25

== Credits and personnel ==
Credits are taken from Independiente liner notes.

- Ricardo Arjona – lead vocals
- Gaby Moreno – lead vocals
- Tommy Torres – recording engineer
- Chris McDonald – conductor / chords arrangements
- Pamela Sixfin – violin
- Connie Elisor – violin
- David Angell – violin
- Mary Katherine VanOsdale – violin
- Karen Winkelmann – violin
- Carolyn Bayley – violin
- Erin Hall – violin
- Zeneba Bowers – violin
- Cornelia Heard – violin
- James Grosjean – viola
- Monisa Angell – viola
- Elizabeth Lamb – viola
- Anthony LaMarchina – cello
- Julia Tanner – cello
- Craig Nelson – bass
- Carlos Cabral "Junior" – recording engineer
- Isaías García – recording engineer
- Jerald Romero – recording engineer
- Dan Rudin – recording engineer
- Dan Warner – bass, guitar, recording engineer
- Lee Levin – drums, percussion, recording engineer
- Matt Rollings – piano, recording engineer
- Peter Wallace – Hammond B-3
- David Thoener – mixing engineer

== Charts ==
=== Weekly charts ===
Chart (2012)	Peak position
Colombia (National-Report)	15
Honduras (Honduras Top 50)	7
Mexico (Billboard International)	6
Mexican Top 20 Pop (Monitor Latino)	15
US Hot Latin Songs (Billboard)	2
US Latin Pop Airplay (Billboard)	1
US Tropical Airplay (Billboard)	1
Venezuela Top 100 (Record Report)	1
Venezuela Top Latino (Record Report)	1

=== Year-end charts ===
Chart (2012)	Peak position
US Latin Songs (Billboard)	27
US Latin Pop Songs (Billboard)	11
Venezuela (Record Report)	40

== Release history ==
Country	Date	Format	Label
Canada	7 February 2012	Digital download	Metamorfosis / Warner Music
United States	7 February 2012	Digital download	Metamorfosis / Warner Music
Mexico	7 February 2012	Digital download	Metamorfosis / Warner Music
Argentina	7 February 2012	Digital download	Metamorfosis / Warner Music
Spain	7 February 2012	Digital download	Metamorfosis / Warner Music
United Kingdom	7 February 2012	Digital download	Metamorfosis / Warner Music
