= Francisco Mata =

Venezuelan singer and composer

Francisco Mata (July 24, 1932 – January 24, 2011) was a Venezuelan singer and composer.

== See also ==
- Venezuela
- Venezuelan music

== Sources ==
- (in Spanish) Fundación Glorias del Folklore
