= Metamorfosis World Tour =

2012–13 concert tour by Ricardo Arjona

- World tour by Ricardo Arjona
- Promotional poster for the tour
- Associated album: Independiente
- Start date: 27 January 2012
- End date: 23 March 2013
- Legs: 5
- No. of shows: 102
- Box office: $11.7 million (US dates)

Ricardo Arjona concert chronology
- Quinto Piso Tour (2009–10); Metamorfosis World Tour Tour (2012–13)

The Metamorfosis World Tour was a worldwide concert tour by Guatemalan singer–songwriter Ricardo Arjona in support of his thirteenth studio album, Independiente. Beginning in January 2012, it was Arjona's first tour since leaving Warner Music to become an independent artist. The tour was announced in December 2011 with dates at American, Argentinian and Chilean venues, and received a positive critical response. The show was designed for a revolving stage, with Arjona performing while the scenery changed with the songs being performed. Four changes of scenery were developed: a two-floor apartment, a bar, a circus and a theatre. The number of songs played at each show varied from 19 to 23.

The tour broke several records. In Buenos Aires it was the best-attended show ever at José Amalfitani Stadium, attracting a total audience of more than 160,000. In Guatemala City, Arjona became the first artist with two consecutive sold-out concerts at the Mateo Flores Stadium. The tour was seen by more than two million people in twenty countries. Most songs performed were from Independiente, and fellow Guatemalan singer–songwriter Gaby Moreno joined Arjona for "Fuiste Tú". The Metamorfosis World Tour followed Arjona's Quinto Piso Tour (one of the most successful tours by a Latin artist, with a total attendance of over one million in 19 countries).

== Background ==
Weeks before the release of Independiente, Arjona published an open letter concerning his past relationships with recording companies. He revealed the circumstances surrounding his first contract ("a producer, friend of mine, told them [the record label] that if they did not sign me in, they won't sign two artists he had [at that time]"), explaining that he received the "minimum royalty percentage" from his most successful albums. Independiente is Arjona's first independent release on his own label: Metamorfosis, a company he created to refocus his career. The company is headed by Arjona and several friends (including photographer–director Ricardo Calderón, Universal Music México executive Humberto Calderon and BMG's Miriam Sommerz), and is based in Miami and Mexico City. Arjona asserted that his independence represented compromise more than freedom: "Inside the word 'Independent', even when it sounds like extreme freedom, there's a big amount of compromise and the responsibility of being able to administrate, in the best way possible, such independence". Billboard noted that while other groups have released independent albums following contracts with major labels, Arjona is the foremost Latin pop artist to do so. Although the album is marketed by the new label, its distribution is handled by Warner Music.

== Concert synopsis ==
=== Scenography ===
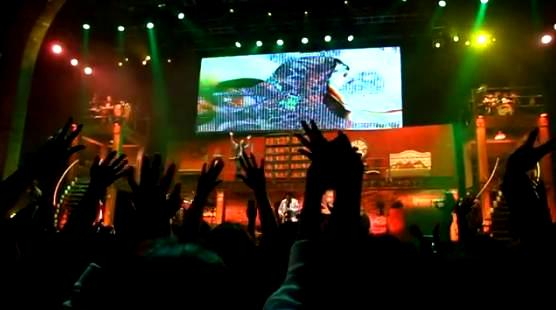
The stage, showing the main LCD screen through which several images are displayed during the show

The revolving stage, showing a change from one design to the next

Arjona performing "Hay Amores" at the Nokia Theatre, Los Angeles in March 2012

The singer performing "Lo Que Está Bien Esta Mal" in Tijuana, Mexico, October 2012

The show was designed for a revolving stage divided into four sets, with Arjona performing with seven musicians and a showgirl. Fifty people were needed to set up the 45-ton stage, which was transported on 17 trucks. One hundred fifty lights, (seventy of which were mobile) were used during each concert, in addition to ten tons of scenery. Each set related to the songs being performed. The first evoked a two-floor apartment with books, tables and chairs. Here Arjona sang "Lo Que Está Bien Está Mal", "Animal Nocturno", "Hay Amores", "Desnuda" and "El Amor" (during the set change). The second set represented a bar, where the singer performed "Historia de Taxi" and "Como Duele". He then interacted with the audience on "Pingüinos en La Cama"; during some concerts Arjona sang to a fan's phone, and invited an older woman onstage to accompany him on "Señora De Las Cuatro Décadas".

The third set was a circus, usually changing while Arjona performed "Reconciliación". Other songs performed on this set were "Tarde (Sin Daños a Terceros)", "Fuiste Tú" (with fellow Guatemalan singer Gaby Moreno), "Te Conozco" and "Si El Norte Fuera El Sur". The fourth set was a theatre, similar to the first. Here the singer performed "El Problema" before leaving the stage, simulating the end of the concert. After a few minutes, Arjona returned to close the show with "Minutos" and "Mujeres".

A large LCD screen was over the stage. At the beginning of the concert a fictional news program called Metamorfosis showed a series of images from Arjona's life, (while "Vida" played in the background) with images of Salvador Allende, Frida Kahlo, Donald Trump, Barack Obama and others during other songs. In Santiago de Chile, the Chilean flag and peace symbols appeared on the screen. In Buenos Aires, the Argentine flag was shown.

=== Music ===
The number of songs played during each concert varied from 19 to 23; seven were from Independiente. Gaby Moreno appeared during every concert to perform "Fuiste Tú". The show began with a video presentation, with "Vida" from Poquita Ropa as background music. The video consisted of images (including those of a young Arjona), movies and shows. Arjona then arrived to sing "Lo Que Está Bien Está Mal", "Animal Nocturno" (from the album of the same name), "Hay Amores" and "Desnuda" (from the album Vivo). In some cities (including Buenos Aires and Santiago de Chile), Arjona performed "Acompáñame A Estar Solo" before "El Amor"; in Monterrey, "El Amor" was performed first.

At his concert in Mendoza, Arjona observed that "The day I chose this career was the day I realized that a spoken verse could earn you a slap, but a sung verse could give you sighs." He then sang "Mi Novia Se Me Está Poniendo Vieja", a song he wrote for his mother. "Dime Que No" and "Como Duele" followed; in Santiago de Chile, "Dime Que No" was replaced by "Historia de Taxi". After "Como Duele" in some shows, "Pingüinos En La Cama" was performed before "Señora De Las Cuatro Décadas". "Reconciliación" was performed next, while the set changed to a circus.

In some concerts "Fuiste Tú" was played before the set changed to a circus, before "Reconciliación". In Santiago de Chile and Buenos Aires, "Fuiste Tú" was performed after "Reconciliación" and "Tarde (Sin Daños a Terceros)"; the latter was performed after "Fuiste Tú" on most dates. "Te Conozco", "Te Quiero" and "Si El Norte Fuera El Sur" followed. Arjona then performed "El Problema" before leaving the stage, simulating the end of the concert. After a few minutes he returned, singing "Minutos" and "Mujeres" to close the show.

== Reception ==
=== Critical response ===
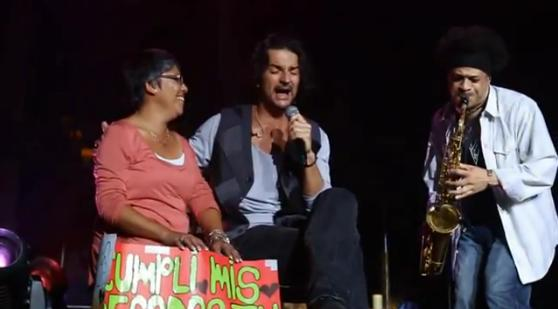
Arjona singing to a woman selected from the public during concert in Santiago de Chile

Arjona singing "Te Quiero" during concert in Guatemala City

The Metamorfosis World Tour was widely praised by critics and fans. Natalie Torres, of the newspaper Dia a Dia, said that "Arjona knows how to handle his 'girls', with a mix of attitudes from a 'rough' male and seductive lyrics." Jon Pareles of The New York Times reported, "Arjona is one of Latin pop's finest lyricists: observant, nuanced, sometimes wry, sometimes melancholy and especially fond of the play of opposites...unlike some of his fellow Latin pop stars, Mr. Arjona is no saccharine lover boy."

Aracely Chantaka of the Mexican newspaper La Vanguardia said after the show in Monterrey, "Arjona's metamorphosis has been noticeable throughout the years. He's not the same young man who sang in a bar accompanied only with a guitar. Today he's surrounded by a great production." She finally stated that "essentially he's the same: the one who sings to love." The Argentine newspaper Clarín praised Arjona's rapport with his largely female audience after his two-year absence from Argentina. The appearance of Gaby Moreno for "Fuiste Tú" was also praised by critics and fans, and was considered the highlight of the show.

=== Records ===
Between 31 March and 1 April 2012, Arjona toured Guatemala, his native country. The two concerts he presented in the Mateo Flores stadium were both sold-out performances, becoming the first artist in Guatemalan history to achieve this feat. As of 16 April 2012, his Metamorfosis World Tour has reached more than 400,000 fans, from which about 160,000 were only from his Buenos Aires tour dates on 12–15 April. On 25 April, Arjona's show on Mendoza, Argentina accumulated an attendance of 24,000 people, breaking the record set by Luis Miguel 10 years prior, and thus becoming the highest-grossing artist ever on that province. Hours before his performance on Mendoza, the Malvinas Argentinas stadium in which the concert was held, a fire burned close to one of the entries of the complex.

== Set list ==
Monterrey
- "Vida" (from Poquita Ropa)(Introductory video)
- "Lo Que Está Bien Está Mal"
- "Animal Nocturno"
- "Hay Amores"
- "Desnuda"
- "El Amor"
- "Acompañame A Estar Solo"
- "Mi Novia Se Me Está Poniendo Vieja"
- "Dime Que No"
- "Cómo Duele"
- "Señora De Las Cuatro Décadas"
- "Fuiste Tú" (with special appearance of Gaby Moreno)
- "Reconciliación"
- "Tarde (Sin Daños a Terceros)"
- "Te Conozco"
- "Si El Norte Fuera El Sur"
- "El Problema"
- "Minutos"
- "Mujeres"
Buenos Aires
- "Vida" (from Poquita Ropa)(Introductory video)
- "Lo Que Está Bien Está Mal"
- "Animal Nocturno"
- "Hay Amores"
- "Desnuda"
- "Acompañame A Estar Solo"
- "El Amor"
- "Mi Novia Se Me Está Poniendo Vieja"
- "Dime Que No"
- "Cuando"
- "Cómo Duele"
- "Pingüinos En La Cama"
- "Señora De Las Cuatro Décadas"
- "Reconciliación"
- "Fuiste Tú" (with special appearance of Gaby Moreno)
- "Tarde (Sin Daños a Terceros)"
- "Te Conozco"
- "Te Quiero"
- "Si El Norte Fuera El Sur"
- "El Problema"
- "Minutos"
- "Mujeres"
Santiago de Chile
- "Vida" (from Poquita Ropa)(Introductory video)
- "Lo Que Está Bien Está Mal"
- "Animal Nocturno"
- "Hay Amores"
- "Desnuda"
- "El Amor"
- "Mi Novia Se Me Está Poniendo Vieja"
- "Historia de Taxi"
- "Cómo Duele"
- "Pingüinos En La Cama"
- "Señora De Las Cuatro Décadas"
- "Reconciliación"
- "Fuiste Tú" (with special appearance of Gaby Moreno)
- "Tarde (Sin Daños a Terceros)"
- "Te Conozco"
- "Si El Norte Fuera El Sur"
- "El Problema"
- "Minutos"
- "Mujeres"

=== Additional notes ===
- The order of the songs performed varied.

== Tour dates ==
Date	City	Country	Venue
North America
27 January 2012	Toluca	Mexico	Teatro Morelos
31 January 2012	Puebla	Mexico	Auditorio Siglo XXI
3 February 2012	San Luis Potosí	Mexico	El Domo
4 February 2012	Querétaro	Mexico	Auditorio Josefa Ortiz
10 February 2012	Mérida	Mexico	Centro de Espectáculos "Jardin Carta Clara"
12 February 2012	Cancún	Mexico	Estadio de Baseball "Beto Ávila"
15 February 2012	Tampico	Mexico	Expo Tampico
18 February 2012	Villahermosa	Mexico	Villahermosa Park
26 February 2012	New York City	United States	Madison Square Garden
2 March 2012	San Juan	Puerto Rico	José Miguel Agrelot Coliseum
3 March 2012	San Juan	Puerto Rico	José Miguel Agrelot Coliseum
9 March 2012	Miami	United States	American Airlines Arena
14 March 2012	San Jose	United States	HP Pavilion
16 March 2012	Los Angeles	United States	Nokia Theatre
17 March 2012	Los Angeles	United States	Nokia Theatre
20 March 2012	Monterrey	Mexico	Monterrey Arena
23 March 2012	Guadalajara	Mexico	Auditorio Telmex
24 March 2012	Mexico City	Mexico	Mexico City Arena
Latin America
29 March 2012	San Salvador	El Salvador	Estadio Magico González
31 March 2012	Guatemala City	Guatemala	Estadio Mateo Flores
1 April 2012	Guatemala City	Guatemala	Estadio Mateo Flores
5 April 2012	Punta del Este	Uruguay	Hotel Conrad Resort
7 April 2012	Córdoba	Argentina	Estadio Mario Alberto Kempes
10 April 2012	Rosario	Argentina	Estadio Newell's Old Boys
12 April 2012	Buenos Aires	Argentina	José Amalfitani Stadium
13 April 2012	Buenos Aires	Argentina	José Amalfitani Stadium
14 April 2012	Buenos Aires	Argentina	José Amalfitani Stadium
15 April 2012	Buenos Aires	Argentina	José Amalfitani Stadium
16 April 2012	Junín	Argentina	Centro Internacional de Eventos de La Sociedad Rural
19 April 2012	Santiago	Chile	Arena Movistar
20 April 2012	Santiago	Chile	Arena Movistar
21 April 2012	Santiago	Chile	Arena Movistar
22 April 2012	Santiago	Chile	Arena Movistar
25 April 2012	Mendoza	Argentina	Estadio Malvinas Argentinas
27 April 2012	Comodoro Rivadavia	Argentina	Predio Ferial
29 April 2012	Neuquén	Argentina	Portal Patagonia Shopping
1 May 2012	Bahía Blanca	Argentina	Club Olimpo
3 May 2012	Santa Fe	Argentina	Club Colón
5 May 2012	Corrientes	Argentina	Club Huracán
6 May 2012	Corrientes	Argentina	Club Huracán
9 May 2012	Montevideo	Uruguay	Estadio Charrua
10 May 2012	Montevideo	Uruguay	Estadio Charrua
12 May 2012	Buenos Aires	Argentina	José Amalfitani Stadium
15 May 2012	Santiago de Chile	Chile	Arena Movistar
17 May 2012	Santiago de Chile	Chile	Parque O'Hiigins
18 May 2012	Concepción	Chile	Estadio Municipal
7 June 2012	Lima	Peru	Jockey Club del Perú
9 June 2012	Arequipa	Peru	Jardin de la Cerveza Arequipa
20 June 2012	Guayaquil	Ecuador	Estadio Alberto Spencer
22 June 2012	Quito	Ecuador	Estadio Olímpico Atahualpa
26 June 2012	Valencia	Venezuela	Forum de Valencia
27 June 2012	Valencia	Venezuela	Forum de Valencia
29 June 2012	Caracas	Venezuela	Terraza del C.C.C.T.
30 June 2012	Caracas	Venezuela	Terraza del C.C.C.T.
1 July 2012	Caracas	Venezuela	Terraza del C.C.C.T.
4 July 2012	Puerto la Cruz	Venezuela	Estadio José Antonio Anzoátegui
7 July 2012	Barquisimeto	Venezuela	Complejo Ferial Bicentenario
10 July 2012	Maracaibo	Venezuela	Palacio de Eventos
11 July 2012	Maracaibo	Venezuela	Palacio de Eventos
13 July 2012	Mérida	Venezuela	Estadio Metropolitano de Mérida
25 July 2012	Cali	Colombia	Plaza de Toros de Cañaveralejo
28 July 2012	Medellín	Colombia	Estadio Envigado
31 July 2012	Manizales	Colombia	Estadio Palogrande
2 August 2012	Bogotá	Colombia	Coliseo Cubierto El Campín
3 August 2012	Bogotá	Colombia	Coliseo Cubierto El Campín
8 August 2012	Bucaramanga	Colombia	Plaza de Toros
11 August 2012	Barranquilla	Colombia	Estadio Romelio Martinez
18 August 2012	San José	Costa Rica	Estadio Ricardo Saprissa
19 August 2012	San José	Costa Rica	Estadio Ricardo Saprissa
23 August 2012	Panama City	Panama	Figali Convention Center
8 September 2012	Santo Domingo	Dominican Republic	Estadio Quisqueya
North America II
22 September 2012	Miami	United States	American Airlines Arena
20 October 2012	Durango	Mexico	Plaza Central
26 October 2012	Tijuana	Mexico	Plaza Monumental de Playas
28 October 2012	Culiacán	Mexico	Foro Tecate
6 November 2012	Tampico	Mexico	Expo Tampico
8 November 2012	Monterrey	Mexico	Arena Monterrey
9 November 2012	Monterrey	Mexico	Arena Monterrey
10 November 2012	Torreón	Mexico	Coliseo Centenario
18 November 2012	Guadalajara	Mexico	Auditorio Telmex
21 November 2012	Mexico City	Mexico	Mexico City Arena
22 November 2012	Mexico City	Mexico	Mexico City Arena
23 November 2012	Mexico City	Mexico	Mexico City Arena
24 November 2012	Mexico City	Mexico	Mexico City Arena
27 November 2012	Puebla	Mexico	Auditorio Siglo XXI
Latin America II
8 December 2012	Managua	Nicaragua	Estadio Nacional
13 December 2012	Tegucigalpa	Honduras	Estadio Chochi Sosa
15 December 2012	San Pedro Sula	Honduras	Estadio Francisco Morazán
North America III / Latin America III
25 January 2013	San Juan	Puerto Rico	José Miguel Agrelot Coliseum
26 January 2013	San Juan	Puerto Rico	José Miguel Agrelot Coliseum
30 January 2013	Puerto Ordaz	Venezuela	Polideportivo Cachamay
1 February 2013	Maturín	Venezuela	Estadio Monumental de Maturín
7 February 2013	Washington, D.C.	United States	Patriot Center
9 February 2013	New York City	United States	Madison Square Garden
14 February 2013	Chicago	United States	Rosemont Theatre
20 February 2013	Grand Prairie	United States	Verizon Theatre at Grand Prairie
22 February 2013	Houston	United States	Toyota Center
26 February 2013	Phoenix	United States	Comerica Theatre
28 February 2013	Las Vegas	United States	Planet Hollywood Resort and Casino
3 March 2013	Los Angeles	United States	Nokia Theatre
9 March 2013	Miami	United States	American Airlines Arena
23 March 2013	Guatemala City	Guatemala	Ciudad Cayala
27 April 2013	Asunción	Paraguay	Club Olimpia's Stadium

=== Cancellations and rescheduled shows ===
17 April 2012	Junín	Argentina	CIE La Sociedad Rural	Rescheduled to 16 April 2012
29 April 2012	Bahía Blanca	Argentina	Club Olimpo	Rescheduled to 1 May 2012
14 May 2012	Tucumán	Argentina	Central Córdoba	Cancelled due to logistical problems
25 October 2012	Mexicali	Mexico		Cancelled for unknown reasons

== Attendance and box office ==
Venue	City	Tickets sold / available	Gross revenue
Madison Square Garden	New York City	13,556 / 13,556 (100%)	$1,282,356
José Miguel Agrelot Coliseum	San Juan, Puerto Rico	26,973 / 26,973 (100%)	$1,752,646
Nokia Theatre L.A. Live	Los Angeles	13,760 / 13,760 (100%)	$1,211,600
Madison Square Garden	New York City	11,905 / 11,905 (100%)	$1,371,732
American Airlines Arena	Miami	13,552 / 13,624 (99%)	$1,287,331
Nokia Theatre L.A. Live	Los Angeles	13,109 / 13,109 (100%)	$1,240,072
Akoo Theatre	Rosemont, Illinois	8,592 / 8,594 (99%)	$781,450
Patriot Center	Fairfax	6,096 / 6,096 (100%)	$585,030
Toyota Center	Houston, Texas	8,193 / 8,193 (100%)	$530,335
Nassau Veterans Memorial Coliseum	Uniondale, New York	8,296 / 10,858 (76%)	$526,207
Verizon Theatre	Grand Prairie, Texas	5,102 / 6,333 (80%)	$406,330
Theatre for the Performing Arts	Las Vegas, Nevada	5,990 / 7,099 (84%)	$390,890
Comerica Theatre	Phoenix, Arizona	4,311 / 4,932 (87%)	$335,509
José Miguel Agrelot Coliseum	San Juan, Puerto Rico	24,774 / 27,500 (90%)	$1,742,082
Totals		164,209/ 172,532 (95%)	$13,443,570
