= Metamorfosis (record label) =

American record label

- Founded: 2011
- Founder: Ricardo Arjona
- Status: Active
- Distributor: Sony Music US Latin LLC
- Genre: Various
- Country of origin: United States, México
- Location: Miami, FL; Mexico City
- Official website: metamorfosis.be

Metamorfosis is an American record label founded by the Guatemalan singer-songwriter Ricardo Arjona in 2011.

== Background and history ==
Arjona has commented several times that he considered the way he decided to go independent raised more compromise than freedom, saying that "Inside the word 'Independent', even when it sounds like extreme freedom, there's a big amount of compromise and the responsibility of being able to administrate, in the best way possible, such independence." Weeks before the release of Independiente, the Guatemalan singer released a letter in which he talked about his past relations with recording companies. In the letter, Arjona revealed that he entered in his first record label by exchange, and that he received the "minimum royalty percentage" from his most successful albums.

Billboard notes that although other groups have decided to launch their works independently after having a contract with major record labels, Arjona is by far the most important artist in Latin pop to follow this trend. On March 29, Billboard reported that Gaby Moreno, who is featured on Arjona's single "Fuiste Tú", had signed with Metamorfosis, saying, "When I turned 17, I was signed by a very important label in the United States, [...], but I didn't feel comfortable when they told me which songs had to go into production."

== Signed artists ==
- Ricardo Arjona
- Gaby Moreno
- Buena Fe (duo)
- Rudy Gagliorio

== Albums released ==
- Ricardo Arjona – Independiente (2011)
- Gaby Moreno – Postales (2012)
- Ricardo Arjona – Viaje (2014)
- Gaby Moreno – Posada (2014)
- Buena Fe – SOY (2015)
- Ricardo Arjona – Apague la Luz y Escuche (2016)
- Gaby Moreno – Illusion (2016)
- Ricardo Arjona – Circo Soledad (2017)
- Ricardo Arjona – Circo Soledad La Despedida CD y DVD (2018)
- Ricardo Arjona – Blanco (2020)

== Personnel ==
- Ricardo Arjona
- Nicolas Fernandez
- Nicole Carvajal
- Alejandra Gutierrez
- Susana Graefe
- Catherine Cybulkiewicz
- Maria Lozano
