= Paquita la del Barrio =

Mexican singer (1947–2025)

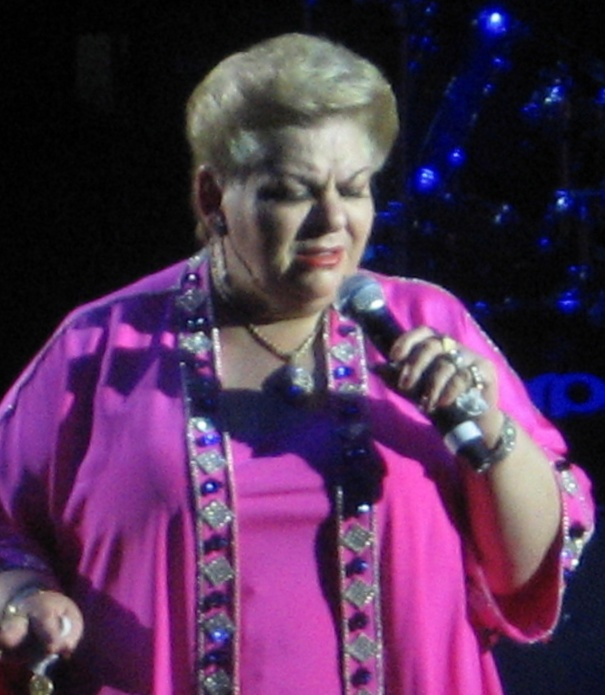
- Paquita performing in 2008

Background information
- Born: Francisca Viveros Barradas; April 2, 1947; Alto Lucero, Veracruz, Mexico
- Origin: Colonia Guerrero, Mexico City, Mexico
- Died: February 17, 2025 (aged 77) Xalapa, Veracruz, Mexico
- Genre: Regional Mexican
- Occupations: Singer; actress
- Years active: 1970–2023
- Labels: Phoenix Records (1982–1992); Discos Musart (1992–2023)
- Spouses: Miguel Gerardo (m. 1964; div. 1975); Alfonso Martínez (m. 1975; died 2001)

Francisca Viveros Barradas (April 2, 1947 – February 17, 2025), known professionally as Paquita la del Barrio (lit. 'Franny, the One from the Neighborhood'), was a Mexican singer. She was a Grammy-nominated performer of rancheras, boleros and other traditional and contemporary Mexican musical genres.

Her songs were often characterized as a female empowering against Mexico's sexist and "macho" male culture and as criticizing Latino men for causing problems in relationships. This theme was present in some of her most notable songs, such as "Rata de dos patas", "Me saludas a la tuya" and "Tres veces te engañé", which became feminist anthems in Mexico.

In 2021, Paquita was honored with the Billboard Latin Music Lifetime Achievement Award.

== Career ==
Paquita started her career in Mexico City in 1970, where she performed at a local restaurant in the Colonia Guerrero, and fans began returning every week to listen to her sing. It is here where she started using her stage name, Paquita la del Barrio. In the early 1980s, she opened her own restaurant-bar, Casa Paquita, in the Colonia Guerrero, where she performed regularly until it was shut by Cuauhtémoc borough authorities in 2006. Her big break came in 1986, after she performed on a Televisa show that exposed her to a wider audience; this led to a recording contract with Discos Musart.

Songs in Paquita's catalogue usually took a feminist stance against Mexico's sexist and "macho" male culture rooted in society, often pointing the finger at the men in her life in lyrics for causing problems in relationships, and generally making them out to be tontos y bobos (clowns and fools). This theme was present in some of her most notable songs, including "Rata de dos patas", "Me saludas a la tuya" and "Tres veces te engañé". This made her especially popular among female audiences. Paquita also was known for her somewhat condescending way of speaking, and for her confrontational presence; her signature phrase was ¿Me estás oyendo, inútil?, or "are you listening to me, you good-for-nothing?" (inútil literally translates to "useless"), used in her hit "Rata de dos patas" (translates to "Two-Legged Rat"). At the 2021 Billboard Music Awards, when reguetonero and singer Bad Bunny went to the stage—to kindly help her with her faulty microphone—she (lovingly) told him, Eres un inútil.

In an interview in 2008, with the Miami Herald, Paquita said, "I am defending women. It is very important. I am a woman. I speak of my experiences." Her best-known song is "Rata de dos patas" (English: "Two-legged rat"), in which she compares an ex-lover to a variety of vermin and other untrustworthy animals, including bugs and "goddamn cockroaches". The song is the title track on her album of the same name. Many of Paquita's albums and songs are popular jukebox staples in Mexican clubs and cantinas. Paquita's influences stemmed from ranchera music, and singers such as Antonio Aguilar and Pedro Infante.

Paquita duetted with singer Ricardo Arjona on "Ni tú ni yo" on his album 5to Piso (2008). She also performed at the Premios Lo Nuestro and the Latin Grammy Awards. Paquita participated in the multi-artist 2010 Haiti earthquake benefit, lending her vocals to "Somos El Mundo", the Spanish version of "We Are The World", produced and organized by Emilio Estefan.

In 2017, Imagen Televisión and Sony Pictures Television jointly produced a series based on her life. The production, Paquita la del Barrio, presents a fictionalized version of the singer's life story. Paquita stated that it was difficult to watch a story of her life, but was pleased that her story was being told.

=== Awards and nominations ===
Year	Award	Category	Work	Result	Ref
2001	2nd Annual Latin Grammy Awards	Best Ranchero Album	Piérdeme el respeto	Nominated	
2001	2nd Annual Latin Grammy Awards	Best Regional Song	"Toscano"	Nominated	
2011	Premios Billboard de la Música Mexicana	Premio La Voz		Won	
2011	12th Annual Latin Grammy Awards	Best Ranchero Album	Eres un farsante	Nominated	
2013	56th Annual Grammy Awards	Best Regional Mexican Music Album (Including Tejano)	Romeo y su nieta	Nominated	
2016	Premio Lo Nuestro 2016	Trajectory Award		Won	
2021	Billboard Latin Music Awards	Lifetime Achievement Award		Won	

== Political career ==
In the 2021 state elections, she ran for a seat in the Congress of Veracruz, representing the Citizens' Movement party. She contended for the Misantla local electoral district, where she placed fifth with 13,284 votes. It was her only venture into politics.

== Personal life and death ==
Paquita la del Barrio was born Francisca Viveros Barradas in Alto Lucero, Veracruz. When she was fifteen years old she eloped with 44-year-old Miguel Gerardo. Her marriage with Gerardo lasted seven years, and she had two sons: Iván Miguel (1968) and Javier (1969). Her first marriage ended when she discovered her husband was married to another woman and had a family. Her second marriage started in 1970s and ended 31 years later with her husband's death in 2001, with whom she had three children: twins who were born on December 26, 1977, and died three days later, on December 29. Her mother died on 11 December from a cancer. In 1979, they adopted Martha Elena, who is Paquita's niece.

In 2022, she was hospitalized for pulmonary thrombosis, which affected her mobility and caused her to limit her appearances. She also experienced health complications due to her diabetes.

Paquita died at her home in Xalapa, Veracruz, on February 17, 2025, at the age of 77.

== Controversy ==
The singer was criticized by the LGBTQ community when she said, in a 2010 interview, "It is better for orphans to die than to be adopted by a homosexual family." Following the backlash, she apologized to the LGBTQ community and gave a special performance and a press conference at a gay club called Spartacus Disco.

== Selected discography ==
Studio albums

- Desquítate Conmigo (1992)
- La Del Barrio (1994)
- Te La Voy a Recordar (1995)
- Bórrate (1995)
- Me Saludas a la Tuya (1998)
- Al Cuarto Vaso (2000)
- Azul Celeste (2000)
- Piérdeme el Respeto (2001)
- El Club de los Inútiles (2001)
- Taco Placero (2001)
- Duro y Contra Ellos (2001)
- Verdad que Duele (2002)
- Pa' Puras Vergüenzas (2002)
- Hombres Malvados (2003)
- Falsaria (2004)
- Qué Mamá tan Chaparrita (2004)
- Para los Inútiles (2004)
- Me Estás Oyendo, Inútil? (2004)
- Lámpara Sin Luz (2004)
- Qué Chulos Campos (2005)
- Llorarás (2005)
- En la Bohemia (2005)
- El Estilo Inconfundible de Paquita la del Barrio (2006)
- Puro Dolor (2007)
- Las Mujeres Mandan (2008)

== See also ==
- List of best-selling Latin music artists
- Women in Latin music
