= Gaby Moreno =

Guatemalan musician (born 1981)

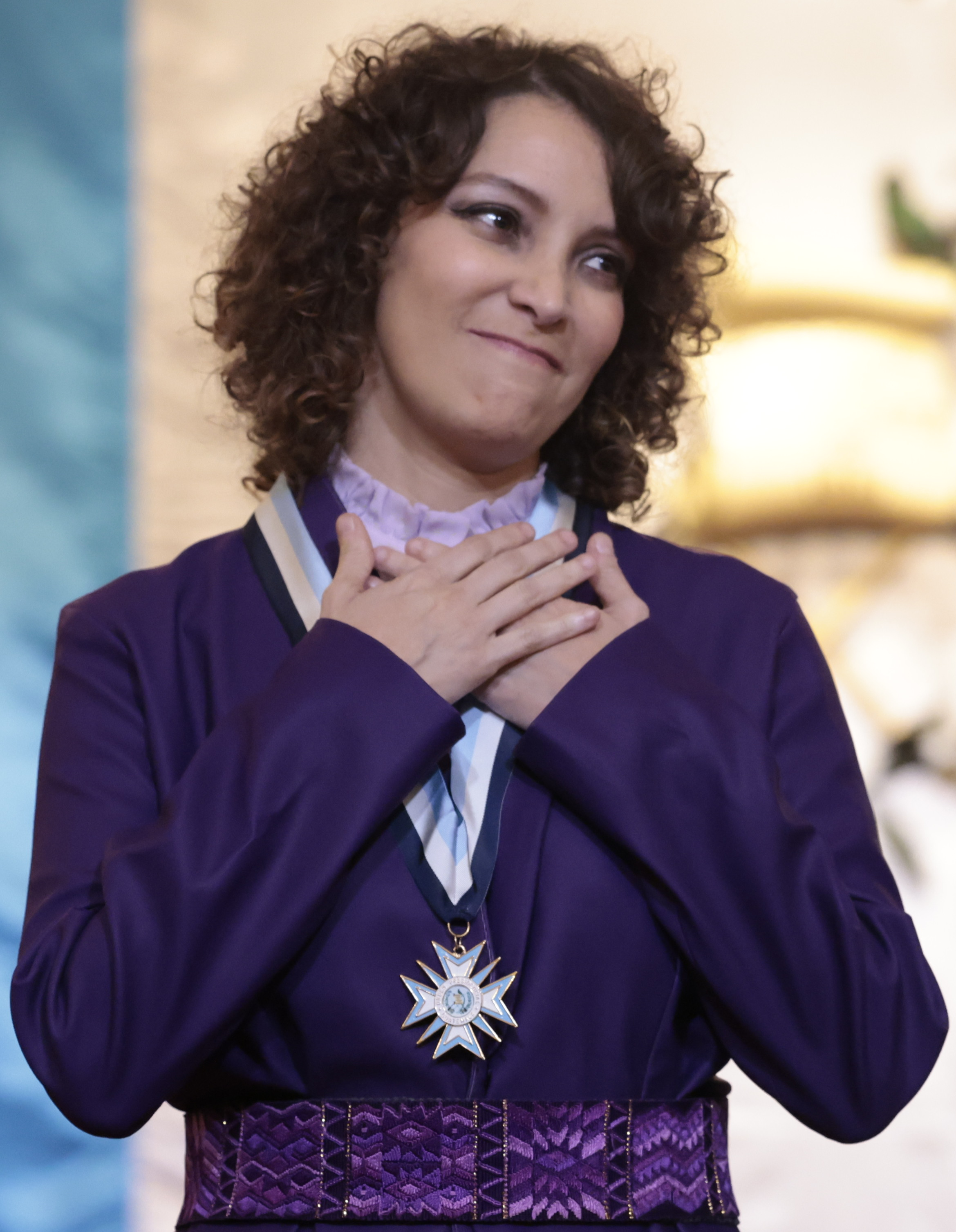
- Moreno in 2024

Background information
- Born: Maria Gabriela Moreno Bonilla; 16 December 1981 (age 44); Guatemala City, Guatemala
- Genres: Blues; Latin; Latin alternative; folk; Americana
- Occupations: Singer, Musician, Songwriter
- Instruments: Vocals, Guitar
- Years active: 1997–present
- Label: Cosmica Artists
- Website: gaby-moreno.com

Maria Gabriela Moreno Bonilla (born 16 December 1981) is a Guatemalan singer-songwriter and guitarist. Singing in both English and Spanish, Moreno's music covers many genres including Latin, alternative, blues, folk and Americana. She has won one Grammy and two Latin Grammy awards.

She made her Broadway debut in March 2026 as Persephone in Hadestown.

== Early life ==
Maria Gabriela Moreno Bonilla was born on 16 December 1981 in Guatemala City and later moved to Los Angeles.

== Career ==
=== Music ===
In August 2009, Moreno toured with Tracy Chapman. Later, in November 2009, Moreno toured as direct support for Ani DiFranco on an East Coast tour. DiFranco invited Moreno back out on tour in January and February 2010. In July 2010 Moreno went on tour in Germany (e.g. in Constance, Heidelberg, and Ravensburg) and France.

In early 2011 Moreno and her band played their first headlining tour. They toured through the Netherlands and Belgium performing as part of the "World Sessions" tour. In addition, Moreno and her band opened as direct support for Nouvelle Vague for three shows in Germany. In late 2011 Gaby toured the U.S. East coast as direct support for The Milk Carton Kids.

Moreno played some concerts in France in February 2012. Later that spring, she performed with Ricardo Arjona during his "Metamorfosis World Tour." In June, Moreno performed on The Tonight Show with Jay Leno to commemorate 50 years of Amnesty International, together with Kris Kristofferson and others. Throughout May and June, Moreno played concerts in Ireland ("Electric Burma" in honor of Aung San Suu Kyi together with Bono, Damien Rice, Bob Geldof, Angelique Kidjo, etc.), Germany, France, and London (with Van Dyke Parks) In July, Moreno played concerts in France, including Le Havre, Verdun, and Paris.

In 2013, she toured with Hugh Laurie and The Copper Bottom Band through Europe, in March 2014 in South America, namely Argentina, Brazil and Mexico.

On 28 February and 1 March 2015, Moreno played at Festival Acústico under the name "Gaby Moreno y amigos". Her performances featured guest appearances by Oscar Isaac, Sara Watkins, Ishto Jueves, Devorah Rahel (with whom she played the song "Y Tu Sombra") and El Gordo. Moreno also played a song called "Maldición, Bendición".

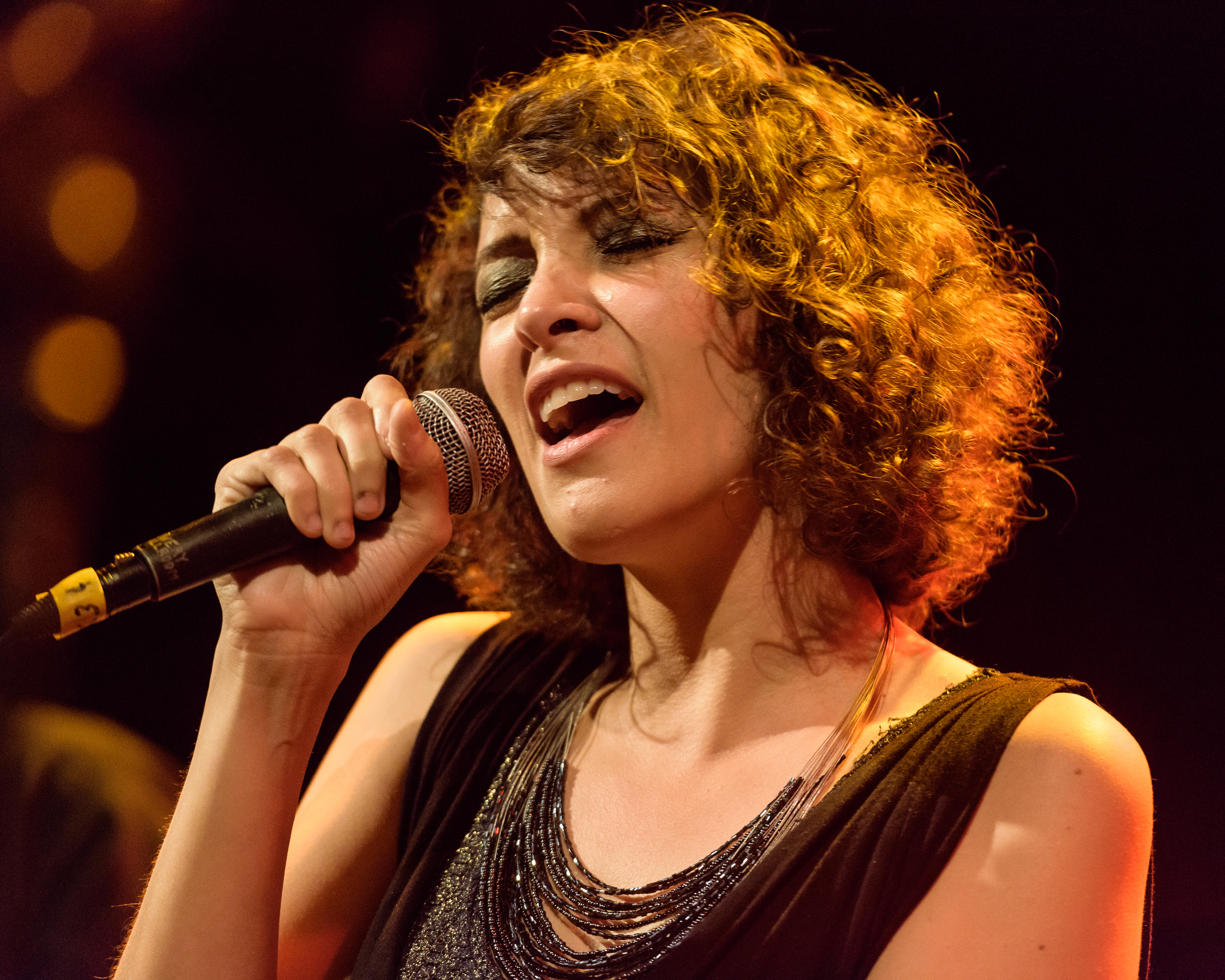
Moreno at the Bowery Ballroom, New York, 2015

In March 2015, Moreno went on tour in Europe, playing at Theater Akzent in Vienna, Austria (19 March, her first show in Vienna), Casino Kulturraum in Friedrichshafen, Germany (20 March), La Spirale in Fribourg, Switzerland (21 March), and Cankar Centre in Ljubljana, Slovenia (24 March). On 24 July 2015 Moreno performed at the Lincoln Center in New York City with Out of Doors. Starting in 2016, Moreno became a recurring guest on Live From Here.

In 2018, Moreno released a cover of Trinidadian artist David Rudder's 1998 song "The Immigrants," made with arranger and producer Van Dyke Parks, ahead of the U.S. Independence Day (4 July), with proceeds going to benefit CARECEN.

¡Spangled!, a collaboration between Moreno and Parks, was released in 2020 on Metamorfosis & Nonesuch Records. The album includes a bolero from Panama, a bossa nova from Brazil, a song by Moreno, David Rudder's "The Immigrants," and Ry Cooder, John Hiatt and Jim Dickinson's song "Across the Borderline," performed with Cooder and Jackson Browne.

=== Composing ===
As a composer, Moreno recorded and produced the score for the feature film Language Lessons (directed by Natalie Morales) and received an Emmy nomination for "Outstanding Original Main Title Theme Song" for the theme song to NBC's show Parks and Recreation.

In 2022, Moreno released a full-length album, Dreamers Dream On, with her three-part harmony side project, The SongBirds, and released her self-produced seventh solo studio album Alegoría, which has earned her a second Grammy Awards nomination.

=== Television ===
Moreno sings the theme song and voices a character (Marlena) for the Disney children's television series, Elena of Avalor. Her version of the song "Cucurrucucú Paloma" was featured in a key scene during the last season of the Netflix original show Orange Is the New Black.

Moreno appeared alongside Rupert Grint in a Catherine Hardwicke-directed episode of Guillermo del Toro's Cabinet of Curiosities. Moreno also collaborated with composer Heitor Pereira to write and perform the song "Por Que Te Vas" for DreamWorks Animation's Puss in Boots: The Last Wish.

== Reception ==
Moreno has been received positively by Al Borde, KCRW, Latina, NBC Latino, NPR (including All Things Considered, Alt. Latino, and Tiny Desk Concerts), Orlando Weekly and The New York Times.

The music video for "Fuiste Tu", her duet with Ricardo Arjona, has amassed over 1 billion views on YouTube.

"This Guatemalan American singer-songwriter alternates fluidly between languages, whether spoken (English and Spanish) or musical, easing in and out of everything from folksy alt country to retro blues rock …Plucky, quirky and insightful, Moreno has the grace and the skill to make it big." – Rhapsody: No. 3 in Top 10 Latin Alt Albums of Spring 2011

In 2012, she was listed as one of the "5 Latinos to Look Out for in 2012" by NBC Latino.

== Discography ==
=== Albums ===
- 2009: Still the Unknown (released independently)
- 2010: A Good Old Christmastime EP (released independently)
- 2011: European release of Still the Unknown (World Connection Records)
- 2011: Illustrated Songs (released independently)
- 2012: European release of Illustrated Songs (World Connection Records)
- 2012: Postales (Metamorfosis)
- 2014: Posada (Christmas Album)
- 2016: Illusion
- 2019: ¡Spangled! (a collaboration with Van Dyke Parks through Nonesuch Records)
- 2022: Alegoría (Metamorfosis)
- 2023: X Mí (Vol 1) (Cosmica Artists)
- 2024: Dusk (Cosmica Artists)

=== Singles ===
- 2009: "Smile" – The Cove – sang the song "Smile" (written by Charlie Chaplin)
- 2010: "Quizas"
- 2017: "He Ain't Heavy, He's My Brother" – with Mike Garson
- 2018: "The Immigrants" – with Van Dyke Parks

== Filmography ==
=== Film ===
Year	Title	Role	Note(s)
2013	Hugh Laurie: Live On The Queen Mary	Backing Vocals	
2019	La Llorona	Title song	

=== Television ===
Year	Title	Role	Note(s)
2017	Family Guy	(voice)	Episode: "Dearly Deported"
2018–20	Elena of Avalor	Marlena (voice)	3 episodes
2019	Undone	Herself	Episode: "Alone In This (You Have Me)"
2022	Guillermo del Toro's Cabinet of Curiosities	Latin Singer	Episode: “Dreams In The Witch House”
2025	Fionna and Cake	Venus Cantrix (voice)	Episode: “The Wolves Who Wandered”

== Awards and nominations ==
In 2006, she won the Grand Prize in the John Lennon Song writing Contest with her song "Escondidos," first in the Latin category, then overall.

In 2010, Moreno was awarded "Favourite American Latino Indie Artist" at the American Latino Awards (run by American Latino TV).

In December 2024, Gaby Moreno was included on the BBC's 100 Women list.

Grammy Awards:

Year	Nominee / work	Award	Result
2017	Ilusión	Best Latin Pop Album	Nominated
2024	X Mi (Vol. 1)	Best Latin Pop Album	Won

Latin Grammy Awards:

Year	Nominee / work	Award	Result
2012	"Fuiste Tú"	Record of the Year	Nominated
2013	Gaby Moreno	Best New Artist	Won
2020	¡Spangled!	Best Traditional Pop Vocal Album	Nominated
2021	"Bolero de la vida" (with Omara Portuondo)	Best Tropical Song	Nominated
2023	Vida (with Omara Portuondo)	Best Traditional Tropical Album	Won
