= 2010 in Latin music =

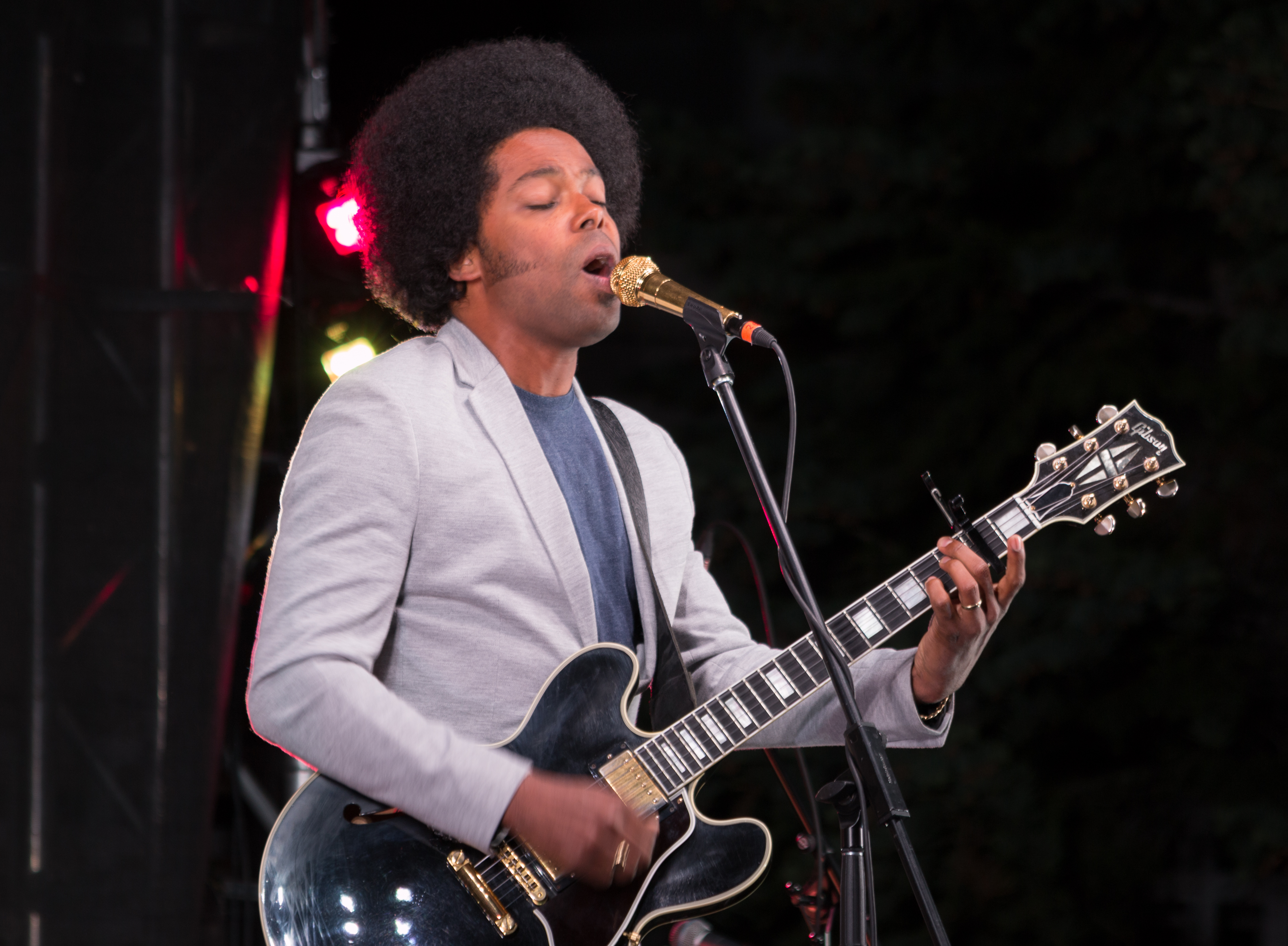
Cuban Canadian singer Alex Cuba won the Latin Grammy Award for Best New Artist.

This is a list of notable events in Latin music (music from Spanish- and Portuguese-speaking areas of Latin America, Europe, and the United States) that took place in 2010.

== Events ==
- November 11 – The 11th Annual Latin Grammy Awards are held at the Mandalay Bay Events Center in Las Vegas, Nevada:
  - Mexican pop group Camila wins the Latin Grammy Award for Record of the Year for "Mientes" while Mario Domm and Monica Velez won the Latin Grammy Award for Song of the Year for the song.
  - A Son de Guerra by Dominican singer and songwriter Juan Luis Guerra and his group 4.40 wins the Latin Grammy Award for Album of the Year.
  - Alex Cuba wins Best New Artist.
  - Spanish tenor Plácido Domingo is honored as the Person of the Year by the Latin Recording Academy.

== Number-one albums and singles by country ==
- List of Hot 100 number-one singles of 2010 (Brazil)
- List of number-one albums of 2010 (Mexico)
- List of number-one albums of 2010 (Spain)
- List of number-one singles of 2010 (Spain)
- List of number-one Billboard Latin Albums from the 2010s
- List of number-one Billboard Top Latin Songs of 2010

== Awards ==
- 2010 Premio Lo Nuestro
- 2010 Billboard Latin Music Awards
- 2010 Latin Grammy Awards
- 2010 Tejano Music Awards

== Albums released ==
=== First quarter ===
==== January ====
Day	Title	Artist	Genre(s)	Singles	Label
5	Down to Earth	Alexis & Fido	Reggaeton, hip hop	"Ojos Que No Ven" "Mi Música Ehh..." "Bartender"	Wild Dogz, Sony Music Latin
19	Adictivo	Limi-T 21	Merengue	"Si Tú No Estás" "Una Despedida"	
25	Morente Flamenco en Directo	Enrique Morente			

==== February ====
Day	Title	Artist	Genre(s)	Singles	Label
2	Magical Radiophonic Heart	Banda de Turistas			
2	Tiempos	Tecupae			
9	Dejarte de Amar	Camila	Latin pop	"Mientes" "Aléjate de Mi" "Bésame" "Entre Tus Alas" "De mí" "De Que Me Sirve La Vida"	Sony Music Latin
9	Mi Sueño	Ana Isabelle			
9	Vital	Fernando Otero			
16	Las Consecuencias	Enrique Bunbury			
18	Sambolero	João Donato Trio	Latin jazz		
23	No Hay Imposibles	Chayanne	Latin pop	"Me Enamoré de Ti" "Tú Boca" "Si Tu No Estás"	Sony Music Latin
23	Puro Cartel	Los Cuates de Sinaloa			

==== March ====
Day	Title	Artist	Genre(s)	Singles	Label
2	Prince Royce	Prince Royce	Bachata	"Stand by Me" "Corazón Sin Cara" "El Amor Que Perdimos" "Mi Ultima Carta"	Top Stop Music
2	A Contracorriente	David Bustamante	Latin Pop	"Abrazame Muy Fuerte" "A contracorriente"	Universal Music
2	Huey Dunbar IV	Huey Dunbar	Salsa	"Te Amaré"	
2	My World	Dyland & Lenny			
9	San Patricio	The Chieftains and Ry Cooder			
9	Cardio	Miguel Bosé			
9	Tango Grill	Pablo Aslan			
16	Otra Cosa	Julieta Venegas			
16	Caricias Compradas	Cuisillos de Arturo Macias			
16	Amar la Trama	Jorge Drexler	Latin pop	"Una Canción Me Trajo Hasta Aquí"	
16	Banda Dois	Gilberto Gil			
20	Hombre Invisible	Ely Guerra			
23	Quiero Decirte Que Te Amo	El Trono de Mexico			
23	Da' Take Over	Angel & Khriz	Reggaeton	"Me Enamoré"	
23	Carpe Diem	Belinda	Electro Pop	"Egoista" "Dopamina"	
23	Jamás Te Dejaré	Cristina			
26	El Brillo de Mis Ojos	Jesus Adrian Romero			
27	Duetos	Renato Russo	Punk rock, folk rock, pop rock, rock, acoustic rock	"Like a Lover"	EMI
30	Sin Salsa No Hay Paraiso	El Gran Combo de Puerto Rico	Salsa	"Sin Salsa No Hay Paraiso" "Es la Mujer"	
30	Los Locos del Corrido	Los Titanes de Durango			
30	Cerrando Trato: Corridos con Tuba	Grupo Montez de Durango			
30	Romantic Style, Pt. 3: Desde la Esencia	Flex			
30	Mi Padre Querido	Los Originales de San Juan			
30	Listo Pa' La Foto	Diomedes Díaz			
30	Segunda Cita	Silvio Rodríguez			
30	The Last Chapter	R.K.M & Ken-Y	Reggaeton	"Te Amaré en Mis Sueños"	

=== Second quarter ===
==== April ====
Day	Title	Artist	Genre(s)	Singles	Label
6	Mi Niña Bonita	Chino & Nacho	Tropical fusion	"Niña Bonita"	Machete Music
6	Maldito Amor	Tierra Cali			
6	Solamente Tú	Duelo			
6	Se Alboroto el Hormiguero	El Compa Sacra			
6	Y el Folclor de Mi Tierra	Checo Acosta			
13	En Vivo En La Mexico	Joan Sebastian			Musart
13	Mi Razón de Vivir	Los Player's			
27	Mundial	Daddy Yankee	Reggaeton, hip hop, Latin rap, merengue, dancehall	"Grito Mundial" "Descontrol" "El Mejor de Todos los Tiempos" "La Despedida" "La Señal"	El Cartel

==== May ====
Day	Title	Artist	Genre(s)	Singles	Label
1	Sonando Ya	Sierra Maestra			
4	Juan Gabriel	Juan Gabriel	Latin pop	"¿Por Qué Me Haces Llorar?"	Fonovisa
4	El Momento	Jowell & Randy			
4	Los Creadores del HYPHY	Los Amos de Nuevo León			
4	Distinto	Diego Torres	Latin pop	"Guapa" "Mi Corazón Se Fue" "No Alcanzan las Flores" "El Mundo Sigue Igual" "Bendito"	
4	El Talento Del Bloque	Farruko	Reggaeton		Siente Music, UMLE
5	Insectos y Bicharracos	Rita Rosa			
11	Con la Nueva Federación	Voz de Mando			
11	Hipnosis	Chetes			
11	A Time for Love	Arturo Sandoval			
18	Entre Familia	Tito Nieves	Salsa	"Tus Promesas de Amor"	
18	Los Claxons	Los Claxons			
18	Puñaladas en el Alma	Dyango	Tango		
23	As Máscaras	Claudia Leitte			
25	Iconos	Marc Anthony	Latin pop	"Y Como Es Él" "Abrázame Muy Fuerte" "A Quien Quiero Mentirle"	Sony Music Latin
25	Larrymania	Larry Hernandez			
25	Empaca Tus Cosas	Conjunto Primavera			
25	Aquí y Ahora	Taxi			

==== June ====
Day	Title	Artist	Genre(s)	Singles	Label
1	On the Rock	Andrés Calamaro			
1	Ni Hoy Ni Mañana	Gerardo Ortíz			
1	Unica	La India	Salsa	"Estupida" "Si Él Habla de Mi"	Top Stop Music
1	Ni Lo Intentes	Julión Álvarez			
1	Limanueva	Narcotango			
1	Bom Tempo	Sérgio Mendes			
7	Das Kapital	Capital Inicial			
8	A Son de Guerra	Juan Luis Guerra & 4.40	Merengue, bachata, tropical, Latin pop	"Bachata en Fukuoka" "La Calle" "La Guagua"	Capitol Latin
8	El Sentido del Aire	Juan Carmona			
8	Enamórate de Mí	El Guero Y Su Banda Centenario			
8	Second Chance	Hector Martignon			
8	Alex Cuba	Alex Cuba			
15	Mi Vida Sin Tu Amor	Jimmy Gonzalez y El Grupo Mazz			
15	Desde la Cantina, Vol. 2	Pesado			
20	100 Sones Cubanos	Various artists			
21	Loqueando y Pisteando	Aliados de la Sierra			
29	Irrepetible	Gilberto Santa Rosa	Salsa	"Vivir Sin Ti"	Sony Music Latin
29	Solo Junto a Ti	Conjunto Atardecer			

=== Third quarter ===
==== July ====
Day	Title	Artist	Genre(s)	Singles	Label
2	Euphoria	Enrique Iglesias	Latin pop, electropop	"Cuando Me Enamoro" "I Like It" "Heartbeat" "No Me Digas Que No" "Tonight I'm F**kin' You" "Dirty Dancer" "Ayer"	Universal Republic/Universal Music Latino
8	Filosofia de Vida	Martinho da Vila			
13	Drama Queen	Ivy Queen	Reggaetón, Hip-Hop, Bachata, R&B, Pop	"La Vida Es Así" "Amor Puro"	Machete Music
13	Fé Na Festa	Gilberto Gil			
13	Revanche	Fresno			
20	Millonario de Amor	Sergio Vega			
20	Un Mexicano en la México	Vicente Fernández			
20	House of Pleasure	Plan B			
20	La Musica del Futuro	Fuego	Merengue	"Que Buena Tu Ta	
27	Todo Depende de Ti	La Arrolladora Banda El Limón			
27	La Vida de un Genio	A.B. Quintanilla and Kumbia All Starz			
27	En Vivo Desde Monterrey	Los Huracanes del Norte			
27	Seu Jorge e Almaz	Seu Jorge and Almaz			
27	La Casa de Playhouse Disney	Topa & Muni			

==== August ====
Day	Title	Artist	Genre(s)	Singles	Label
3	Música de Brinquedo	Pato Fu			
10	Del Rancho Para el Mundo	Espinoza Paz			Disa
10	Ni El Diablo Te Va a Querer	Los Rieleros del Norte			
10	Sincopa	Cartel de Santa			
10	Dirty Bailarina	Mala Rodríguez			
10	Raras Partituras 6	Leopoldo Federico and El Arranque			
14	Ao Vivo	Michel Teló			
17	Rayando El Sol	Manny Manuel			
24	Poquita Ropa	Ricardo Arjona	Latin pop	"Puente" "Vida" "Marta"	Warner Music
24	La Dulzura	Cultura Profética			
24	Con Estilo...Chicago Style	Grupo Montez de Durango			
24	Clasaficado R	Akwid			
31	L-O-V-E	Issac Delgado			
31	Chucho's Steps	Chucho Valdés and the Afro-Cuban Messengers			
31	José Serebrier: Sinfonia No. 1	José Serebrier			

==== September ====
Day	Title	Artist	Genre(s)	Singles	Label
7	La Batalla	Roberto Tapia			
7	La Fiesta	Grupo Exterminador			
14	Luis Miguel	Luis Miguel	Latin pop	"Labios de Miel"	Warner Music Mexico
14	Te Tengo o Te Perdí	Juan Vélez			
14	15 Años	Pastora Soler			
21	Indispensable	Lucero			
21	La Revolución: Live	Wisin & Yandel			
21	Puras de Jose Alfredo	Los Creadorez del Pasito Duranguense de Alfredo Ramírez			
21	Alex, Jorge y Lena	Alex, Jorge y Lena	Latin pop	"Estar Contigo"	
21	Canta un Homenaje a Juan Gabriel	Lucía Méndez			
21	Vida da Minha Vida	Zeca Pagodinho			
28	Te Pido Perdón	Patrulla 81			
28	La Güera Y La Morena	Los Horóscopos de Durango			
28	Viva la Tradición	Spanish Harlem Orchestra			
29	Me Gusta lo Bueno	Los Dareyes de la Sierra			

=== Fourth quarter ===
==== October ====
Day	Title	Artist	Genre(s)	Singles	Label
5	El Hombre Que Más Te Amó	Vicente Fernández			
5	Homenaje a los Grandes	Edwin Bonilla			
12	En Total Plenitud	Marco Antonio Solís		"A Dónde Vamos a Parar" "Tú Me Vuelves Loco"	Fonovisa
13	Bicicletas, Bolos e Outras Alegrias	Vanessa da Mata			d
19	Sale el Sol	Shakira	Latin pop merengue music rock en Español world music	"Loca" "Sale el Sol" "Rabiosa" "Antes de las Seis" "Addicted to You"	Sony Music Latin
19	Obligame	Héctor Acosta "el Torito"	Bachata	"Me Duele la Cabeza"	Venemusic
19	El Último Suspiro	Kinto Sol			
25	Más Allá Del Tiempo Y La Distancia	Grupo Bryndis			
25	Con La Mente en Blanco	Voz de Mando			
25	Sueño Electro I	Belanova			
25	Corriente Vital: 10 Años	Ojos de Brujo			
26	Entren Los Que Quieran	Calle 13			
29	Forver Together	Fidel Nadal			

==== November ====
Day	Title	Artist	Genre(s)	Singles	Label
2	Armando	Pitbull	"Watagatapitusberry" "Maldito Alcohol" "Bon, Bon" "Tu Cuerpo"		
2	Los Verdaderos	Zion & Lennox			
2	Panamericana Suite	Paquito D'Rivera			
9	Extranjera	Dulce María	Latin pop	"Inevitable" "Ya No"	Universal Music Latino
9	Por lo Menos Hoy	No Te Va Gustar			
9	20 Años de Éxitos en Vivo	Banda Machos			
12	E a Gente Sonhando	Milton Nascimento			
14	El Arbol	Los Tucanes de Tijuana			
16	Don Omar Presents: Meet the Orphans	Don Omar	Reggaeton	"Danza Kuduro" "Huérfano De Amor" "Taboo" "Estoy Enamorado"	Machete Music
16	Puros Toques... En Vivo	Larry Hernandez			
16	Salsa: Un Homenaje a el Gran Combo	El Gran Combo de Puerto Rico			
16	Tango Universal	Vayo			
16	Bicentenario 1810/1910/2010	Pepe Aguilar			
16	Alucinação	Leonardo			
16	Sigo Aquí	Charlie Cruz	Salsa	"Necesito Más de Ti"	
22	La Gran Señora en Vivo	Jenni Rivera			
30	Viva el Príncipe	Cristian Castro	Latin pop	"La Nave del Olvido"	Universal Music Latino

==== December ====
Day	Title	Artist	Genre(s)	Singles	Label
1	Yeahwon	Yeahwon			
1	Tárrega!	Manuel Barrueco			
3	Sou Eu – Ao Vivo	Diogo Nogueira			
7	P.A.R.C.E.	Juanes	Latin pop	"Yerbatero" "Y No Regresas" "Regalito"	Universal Music Latino
7	Boleros	Juan Gabriel			
7	En Vivo Desde Nueva York	El Trono de Mexico			
7	Renovar o Morir	Calibre 50			
7	Multishow ao Vivo: Ivete Sangalo no Madison Square Garden	Ivete Sangalo			
7	Ária	Djavan			
7	Sorrir Faz a Vida Valer	Roberta Miranda			
8	Vivo en Arequito	Soledad			
8	Horizonte Vivo Distante	Rosa de Saron			
10	Capoeira de Besouro	Paulo César Pinheiro			
14	Indestructible	Elvis Crespo	Merengue	"15 Inviernos"	
14	Toda una Vida (Cuban Masterworks)	Albita Rodriguez			
29	Henry El Camioncito Verde	Jessyca Sarango			

=== Dates unknown ===
Title	Artist	Genre(s)	Singles	Label
Homenaje a Mi Padre	Sunny Sauceda y Todo Eso	Tejano		
Las Penas Alegres	Petrona Martínez	Bullerengue		
De Corazón a Corazón Mariachi Tango	Aida Cuevas	Tango		
Sonata Suite	Tomatito	Flamenco		
Ruido	José Mercé	Flamenco		
AfricaNatividade - Cheiro de Brasil	Sandra de Sá	Brazilian pop		
D.N.A.	Jorge Vercillo	MPB		
Double Face	Zezé Di Camargo & Luciano	Música sertaneja		
Retrato: Ao Vivo no Estúdio	César Menotti & Fabiano	Música sertaneja		
Lo Mejor De Playhouse Disney	Various artists	Children's		
Mundo Alas	León Gieco			
Mena	Javiera Mena			
Efêmera	Tulipa Ruiz	MPB		
Música, gramática, gimnasia	Dënver	Indie-pop		
Rita Indiana	Rita Indiana	Latin alternative, merengue		

== Best-selling records ==
=== Best-selling albums ===
The following is a list of the top 10 best-selling Latin albums in the United States in 2010, according to Billboard.

Rank	Album	Artist
1	The Last	Aventura
2	Euphoria	Enrique Iglesias
3	Iconos	Marc Anthony
4	Dejarte de Amar	Camila
5	La Revolución	Wisin & Yandel
6	Sale el Sol	Shakira
7	La Gran Señora	Jenni Rivera
8	No Hay Imposibles	Chayanne
9	Amarte a la Antigua	Pedro Fernández
10	En Vivo: Desde Culiacán	Larry Hernandez

=== Best-performing songs ===
The following is a list of the top 10 best-performing Latin songs in the United States in 2010, according to Billboard.

Rank	Single	Artist
1	"Cuando Me Enamoro"	Enrique Iglesias featuring Juan Luis Guerra
2	"Al Menos"	La Original Banda el Limón
3	"Dile al Amor"	Aventura
4	"Dime Que Me Quieres"	Banda el Recodo
5	"Niña Bonita"	Chino & Nacho
6	"Ando Bien Pedo"	Banda Los Recoditos
7	"Me Gusta Todo de Ti"	Banda el Recodo
8	"Te Recordaré"	El Trono de Mexico
9	"Te Pido Perdón"	Tito "El Bambino"
10	"La Peinada"	Chuy Lizarraga y su Banda Tierra Sinaloense

== Deaths ==
- January 4 – Sandro de América, 64, Argentinian singer, complications from heart and lung transplant surgery.
- February 18 – Ariel Ramírez, 88, Argentine composer and pianist, pneumonia.
- February 28 – Jorge Villamil, 80, Colombian composer, complications from diabetes.
- March 4 – Johnny Alf, 80, Brazilian singer and composer, prostate cancer.
- March 9 – Tato Luzardo, 65, Spanish music executive
- April 7 – Graciela, 94, Cuban singer, renal and pulmonary failure.
- May 5 – Lucho Barrios, 76, Peruvian bolero singer.
- May 7 – Francisco Aguabella, 84, Cuban-born American jazz percussionist, cancer.
- May 17 – Héctor Meneses, 68, Mexican singer and songwriter
- June 8 – Armando Zabaleta, 83, Colombian songwriter
- July 12:
  - Olga Guillot, 87, Cuban singer, infarction.
  - Paulo Moura, 77, Brazilian saxophonist and clarinetist, lymphoma.
- August 7 – Roberto Cantoral, 75, Mexican composer, heart attack.
- August 13 – Steve Jordan, 71, American accordionist, complications from liver cancer.
- August 19 – José Antonio Labordeta, 75, Spanish songwriter, professor, writer, presenter and politician.
- August 21 – Hugo Guerrero Marthineitz, 86, Peruvian journalist, commentator and radio host, cardiac arrest.
- September 28 – Romina Yan, 36, Argentine actress (Chiquititas), cardiac arrest.
- November 14 – Tony Moreno, 66, Cuban promoter and record label executive (MP Records)
- November 26 – Mario Pacheco, 60, Spanish music producer and photographer.
- December 13 – Enrique Morente, 67, Spanish flamenco singer.
- December 23 – Toninho Spessoto, 52, Brazilian entertainment journalist
- December 28 – Zeferino Nandayapa, 79, Mexican classical marimbist, injuries from a fall.
