= Marta (Ricardo Arjona song) =

Single by Ricardo Arjona

from the album Poquita Ropa
- Released: March 21, 2011
- Recorded: 2010
- Genre: Latin pop
- Length: 5:51 (Album Version)
- Label: Warner Latina
- Songwriter: Ricardo Arjona
- Producers: Ricardo Arjona, Dan Warner

Ricardo Arjona singles chronology
"Vida" (2010)	"Marta" (2011)	"El Amor" (2011)

"Marta" is a Latin pop song recorded by Guatemalan recording artist Ricardo Arjona. It was released on March 21, 2011 as the third and final single from his twelfth studio album, Poquita Ropa (2010) but failed to chart. It was written by Arjona, who produced it with longtime collaborators Dan Warner and Lee Levin under their stage name, Los Gringos. An accompanying music video for "Marta" was released in March 2011 and features Mexican actress Edith Gonzalez. It was directed by Joaquín Cambre. The video was used as part of the feature film Poquita Ropa — Una Historia Apasionada.

== Background ==
Poquita Ropa is similar in style to Arjona's work on Galería Caribe (2000). With the album, Arjona wanted to drastically change his musical style. He tried to use as few instruments as possible, resulting in a production that sounds like a cappella performances. Arjona talking about the album, stated that "music and women look better with little clothes", and that "they [the songs] are like women; they get things up and are so concerned about this that they forget that the less clothes, more beauty. The songs are often overwhelmed by ourselves, because we saturate them with arrangements looking to exalt their qualities and we end up hiding them."

Arjona produced the album with the assistance of Dan Warner, who has worked with Shakira, Celine Dion and Christina Aguilera. Jason Birchmeier from Allmusic commented that Poquita Ropa "finds Arjona at his most naked, backed by spare arrangements of acoustic guitar, piano, and Hammond B-3 along with occasional touches of strings, woodwinds, and chorus vocals." Poquita Ropa was the first album that Arjona recorded without producer Tommy Torres, whose last production was 5to Piso (2008).

== Composition ==
"Marta" is a latin pop song that is "anchored by percussion," and was written by Arjona, who produced it alongside longtime collaborators Dan Warner and Lee Levin, under their stagename Los Gringos. Roger Silvestre Ramírez and Wendy Pedersen provided additional background vocals on the song, while Andrés Saavedra and Isaías García served as the recording engineers. Matt Rollings provided both the piano and its arrangements, as well as playing the Hammond B-3; Lee Levin performed the drums and percussion instruments while Briang Lang provided the bass. Jason Birchmeier from Allmusic praised the song, stating that it "pack[s] a punch." Arjona said that "Marta" is "one of those songs with brushworks related to something that happened, put on the magnifying glass of the author."

== Promotion ==
=== Music video ===
Edith González played Marta on the music video for the song, and she considered that her work on it was "heavy, more than daring, strong".

In the beginning of March 2011, Arjona released a teaser for the video of "Marta". > On 29 March 2011, the entire music video was released on the iTunes Store, alongside the single release of the song. Mexican telenovela actress Edith González is featured on the music video. She commented that "what I had to do was heavy, more than daring, strong, I accepted because Arjona is of the stars on the musical market, whoever likes it or not." Joaquín Cambre, who also directed the music videos for "Puente" and "Vida", directed the music video for "Marta".

The video starts showing Arjona watching through a window while Edith Gonzalez walks over the street to which the window is fronting. Then, the singer is shown singing while playing the song on a piano, interpolated with images of Gonzalez on a small flat. Moments after, a man is shown inside the flat alongside Gonzalez, as she is about to dance and have sex with him. After they had sex, the man puts some bills on the table and leaves the room. Then, Gonzalez is shown drinking wine before committing suicide inside the bathtub. As of 16 August 2012, the video has reached 4.1 million views on YouTube.

=== Live performances and media appearances ===
"Marta" was included on the film Poquita Ropa – Una Historia Apasionada, a compilation of the music videos for all of the songs on the album which premiered in February 2011 by HBO. It was directed by Joaquín Cambre, and co-starred Arjona, González, Edgar Vivar, Daniel Arenas, Mimi Morales, and Kenny. Jesús Grovas, HBO's corporate communication manager for Mexico and Central America said that it was "a pleasure to have on screen the music of a songwriter like Ricardo Arjona, which is warranty of quality". The film was also broadcast by A&E.

== Trackslisting ==
- Digital Download
1. "Marta" — 5:51
2. "Marta" (music video) — 5:51

== Credits and personnel ==
The credits are taken from the iTunes exclusive digital booklet.

Personnel

- Ricardo Arjona — Composer, chorus
- Matt Rollings — piano, piano arrangements, Hammond B-3
- Doug Emery — Hammond B-3
- Lee Levin — percussion, drums
- Briang Lang — bass
- Roger Silvestre Ramírez — chorus, background vocals
- Wendy Pedersen — background vocals
- Andrés Saavedra — recording engineer
- Isaías García — recording engineer

Technical

- Xarah — Pro Tools
- Chris Zalles — Pro Tools
- Sebastian Krys — mixing engineer
- Gavin Lurseen — mastering engineer
- Reuben Cohen — mastering assistant
- Guido Díaz — sound engineer on "Puente" (Caribe)
- Juan Mario Aracil — sound engineer, mixing engineer on "Puente" (Caribe)
- Ricardo Arjona — creative direction
- Carlos R. Perez — creative direction
- Elasticpeople.com — graphic design

== Release history ==
Digital releases
Country	Date	Format	Label
United States	29 March 2011	Digital download	Warner Music
Argentina	29 March 2011	Digital download	Warner Music
Brazil	29 March 2011	Digital download	Warner Music
Mexico	29 March 2011	Digital download	Warner Music
Chile	29 March 2011	Digital download	Warner Music
