= Tocando Fondo =

Single by Ricardo Arjona

from the album 5to Piso
- Released: July 25, 2009
- Recorded: 2008
- Genre: Latin pop
- Length: 4:28
- Label: Warner Music Latina
- Songwriter: Ricardo Arjona
- Producer: Ricardo Arjona

Ricardo Arjona singles chronology
"Sin Ti... Sin Mi" (2009)	"Tocando Fondo" (2009)	"Puente" (2010)

"Tocando Fondo" is a song written by Guatemalan singer-songwriter Ricardo Arjona for his eleventh studio album, 5to Piso (2008). The song was released as the third single from the album.

== Music video ==
The music video for "Tocando Fondo" was filmed in Mexico City. Website Estereofonica commented that the clip "translates in a very literal way the meaning of the song." Arjona stated that "Tocando Fondo" talks about those feelings "that can make us fall in a precipice."

== Trackslisting ==
Digital Download
No.	Title	Writer(s)	Length
1.	"Tocando Fondo"	Ricardo Arjona	4:28

== Charts ==
"Tocando Fondo" became a moderate hit form Arjona. On the Billboard Latin Songs chart, the song only managed to reach No.20, the first single from 5to Piso not to enter the top 10, after "Como Duele" reaching No.2 and "Sin Ti... Sin Mi" reaching No.4. The song proved more successful on the Latin Pop Songs component chart, reaching No.6 and thus becoming 5to Piso's third top ten hit on that list, after "Como Duele" at No.1 and "Sin Ti... Sin Mi" at No.4. On the year end charts, "Tocando Fondo" was the 28th best-performing single of 2009 on the Latin Pop Songs chart.

=== Weekly charts ===
Chart (2009)	Peak position
US Hot Latin Songs (Billboard)	20
US Latin Pop Airplay (Billboard)	6

=== Yearly charts ===
Chart (2009)	Peak position
US Billboard Latin Pop Songs	28

== Release history ==
Country	Date	Format	Label
Worldwide	July 25, 2009	Mainstream radio	Warner Music Latina
