= Como Duele (Ricardo Arjona song) =

2008 single by Ricardo Arjona Perez

"Cómo Duele"

Single by Ricardo Arjona

from the album 5to Piso
- Released: 4 November 2008
- Recorded: 2008
- Genre: Latin pop
- Length: 3:30 (Album Version)
- Label: Warner Music
- Songwriter: Ricardo Arjona
- Producer: Ricardo Arjona

Ricardo Arjona singles chronology
"Quiero" (2007)	"Cómo Duele" (2008)	"Sin Ti... Sin Mi" (2009)

"Como Duele" (English: How Much It Hurts) is a latin pop song by Guatemalan recording artist Ricardo Arjona, released on 4 November 2008 as the lead single from his eleventh studio album, 5to Piso (2008). The song was written and produced by Arjona along with longtime collaborators Dan Warner and Lee Levin under their stage name Los Gringos, with additional production work and background vocals from Puerto Rican singer-songwriter Tommy Torres. "Como Duele" is the first single Arjona releases after signing a record deal with Warner Music in 2008, after being signed to Sony Music since 1993.

Lyrically, "Como Duele" was intended to show "the monotony that attacks the couples that have many years together, the lack of passion and regretted love that seems to pose over them." The song became a commercial success for Arjona, becoming his first top ten single in the US Billboard Top Latin Songs since 2005 and, with a peak of No.2, his highest entry on that list since "El Problema" in 2002. It also became his sixth song to top the Latin Pop Songs chart, as well as reaching the top in Mexico and Venezuela. "Como Duele" was critically praised by media outlets, receiving comparisons to Arjona's previous song "Olvidarte", and being considered as his "biggest hit in years".

An accompanying music video for "Como Duele" was released in September 2008. It was directed by Ricardo Calderón and filmed in Mexico City. In the clip, focused on a department which rooms are being moved, Arjona is shown inside a room that goes empty, and everything that gave life to the place is going away until the department is finally demolished. "Como Duele" was included in the set list of Arjona's Quinto Piso Tour (2009) and Metamorfosis World Tour (2012).

== Background ==
I constantly change and i would be worried if i wouldn't, [...]. I try to be a composer with the doors open for albums of different nature.

— Ricardo Arjona.

After spending the majority of his career signed to Sony, and later, Sony BMG, Arjona signed a long-term recording deal with Warner Music Latina. The deal was closed in September 2008. Iñigo Zabala, chairman of Warner Music Latin America commented that "He's an artist that fits perfectly with our company," and that "We are a label that has a major catalog of songwriters and quality pop and rock from the likes of Maná, Alejandro Sanz, Laura Pausini, and now, Arjona." In an interview, the singer commented that while composing 5to Piso he "tried to recoup some of the freshness" of his past releases, stating that "it makes so good to the songs". He further stated that he believes "all albums are result of an evolution, and contradictions either", also stating that he celebrated contradictions as part of life. Arjona begun working on the album as early as 2005. Talking about the process of recording the album, he stated that "We must work to make the albums comfortable to us", further commenting that "The rest is a matter of how good or bad the albums defend themselves."

== Composition ==
"Como Duele" is a latin pop ballad about "the monotony that attacks the couples that have many years together, the lack of passion and regretted love that seems to pose over them." Jason Birchmeier from Allmusic called the song "phenomenal", and considered it as to be "his biggest hits in years". He also named it, alongside "Sin Ti.. Sin Mi" and "El Del Espejo", to be a standout track from the album. An editor from El Mercurio Online commented that "Como Duele" is "a ballad of merciless chords and lyrics plagued of contradictions made metaphors." He also stated that "Is the logic of [past Arjona's single] 'Olvidarte', that song in which the guatemalan talked about making something as difficult as 'pulling the hair out of a bottle'," and compared it to his past song "Olvidarte", from Sin Daños a Terceros.

== Chart performance ==
"Como Duele" became a commercial success for Arjona. In the United States, the song reached number two and became Arjona's first top ten single in the Billboard Top Latin Songs since "Acompañame A Estar Solo", which reached number seven in 2005, and his highest-charting single there since "El Problema", which reached number one back in 2002. "Como Duele" became Arjona's sixth song to reach number one on the Billboard Latin Pop Songs chart after debuting at number eight, and is the first to do so since "Acompañame A Estar Solo". Additionally, the song appeared on the Latin Regional Mexican Airplay chart at number 33, and at number 69 on the Radio Songs chart, being the only song ever by the artist to chart on the latter. "Como Duele" became a hit in Latin America, reaching number one position in Mexico and Venezuela. On the Billboard year-end charts for 2009, "Como Duele" finished at number 40 on the Top Latin Songs chart, and at number 14 on the Latin Pop Songs chart.

== Music video ==
The music video for "Como Duele" was shot in Mexico City in September 2008, in a forum and some other places in the city. It was released on 20 October and was directed by the Mexican filmmaker Ricardo Calderón, who later in 2012 joined Arjona on his own record label, Metamorfosis. The story takes place in a department which rooms are being moved, and in where Arjona lived with his couple. As the video progresses, the room goes empty, and everything that gave life to the place is going away until the department if finally demolished.

== Credits and personnel ==
The credits are taken from the iTunes exclusive digital booklet.

Personnel

- Arrangements – Chris McDonald, Dan Warner, Lee Levin, Tommy Torres
- Backing Vocals – Tommy Torres
- Bass, Guitar – Dan Warner
- Cello – Anthony LaMarchina, Carole Rabinowitz
- Drums, Percussion – Lee Levin
- Recording engineer (Assistant) – Matt Helman
- Keyboards – Peter Wallace
- Mixing engineer(s) – David Thoener
- Piano – Matt Rollings
- Producer – Dan Warner, Lee Levin, Tommy Torres
- Recording engineer(s) – Andres Saavedra, Bernard Levin, Dan Warner, Isaías García, Lee Levin, Randy Poole, Tommy Torres
- Viola – Kristin Wilkinson, Monisa Angell
- Violin – Alan Umstead, Carolyn Bailey, Cathy Umstead, Conni Ellisor, David Angell, Mary Katheryn VanOsdale, Pamela Sixfin
- Violin, Concertmaster – Carl Gorodetzky

== Track listing ==
- Digital Download
1. "Como Duele" – 3:30
- Bachata Version
1. "Como Duele" (featuring Voz a Voz) – 3:20

== Charts ==
=== Weekly charts ===
Chart (2008)	Peak position
US Hot Latin Songs (Billboard)	2
US Latin Pop Airplay (Billboard)	1
US Regional Mexican Airplay (Billboard)	33
US Radio Songs (Billboard)	69
Venezuela Top Latino (Record Report)	1

=== Yearly charts ===
Chart (2009)	Peak position
US Latin Songs (Billboard)	40
US Latin Pop Songs (Billboard)	14

== Release history ==
Country	Date	Format	Label
Worldwide	29 September 2008	Mainstream radio	Warner Music
Canada	4 November 2008	Digital download	Warner Music
Mexico	4 November 2008	Digital download	Warner Music
United States	4 November 2008	Digital download	Warner Music
Spain	4 November 2008	Digital download	Warner Music
Argentina	4 November 2008	Digital download	Warner Music
Chile	4 November 2008	Digital download	Warner Music
United Kingdom	4 November 2008	Digital download	Warner Music
Brazil	4 November 2008	Digital download	Warner Music
