= Vida (Ricardo Arjona song) =

Single by Ricardo Arjona

from the album Poquita Ropa
- Released: 7 December 2010
- Recorded: 2010
- Genre: Latin pop
- Length: 5:15 (Album Version)
- Label: Warner Latina
- Songwriter: Ricardo Arjona
- Producers: Ricardo Arjona, Dan Warner

Ricardo Arjona singles chronology
"Puente" (2010)	"Vida" (2010)	"Marta" (2011)

"Vida" is a latin pop song by Guatemalan recording artist Ricardo Arjona, released on 7 December 2010 as the second single from his twelfth studio album, Poquita Ropa (2010). The song was written by Arjona, who produced it with longtime collaborators Dan Warner and Lee Levin under their stage name Los Gringos. The song is considered to be an autobiographical song for the singer, and its lyrics are based on "matters of identity".

An accompanying music video for "Vida" was released in November 2010. It was directed by Joaquín Cambré and filmed in Mexico, and "represent[s] that mix of feelings crafting an ambience of hope inside of a story that inevitably has a tragic end." The video was used as part of the feature film Poquita Ropa — Una Historia Apasionada as well as on Arjona's Metamorfosis World Tour. As of 28 July 2012, the video has reached 3.9 million views on YouTube.

== Background ==
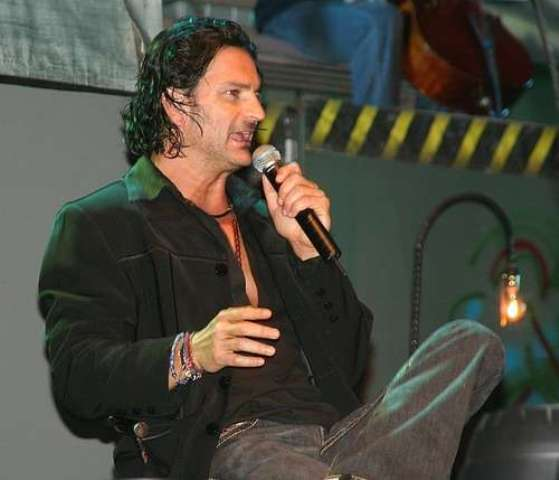
In Poquita Ropa Arjona tried to use as few instruments as possible.

With Poquita Ropa, Arjona wanted to drastically change his musical style. He tried to use as few instruments as possible, resulting in a production that sounds like a capella performances. Arjona said about the album, "music and women look better with little clothes", and that "they [the songs] are like women; they get things up and are so concerned about this that they forget that the less clothes, more beauty. The songs are often overwhelmed by ourselves, because we saturate them with arrangements looking to exalt their qualities and we end up hiding them."

Arjona produced the album with the assistance of Dan Warner, who has worked with Shakira, Celine Dion and Christina Aguilera. Jason Birchmeier from Allmusic commented that Poquita Ropa "finds Arjona at his most naked, backed by spare arrangements of acoustic guitar, piano, and Hammond B-3 along with occasional touches of strings, woodwinds, and chorus vocals." Poquita Ropa was the first album that Arjona recorded without producer Tommy Torres, whose last production was 5to Piso (2008). The album is similar in style to Arjona's work on Galería Caribe (2000).

== Composition ==
"Vida" (2010)
A 23-second sample of "Vida", showcasing the final chorus after the two main verses, as well as the background vocals by Roger Silvestre Ramírez and Wendy Pedersen.

"Vida" is a latin pop song written by Arjona, who produced it alongside longtime collaborators Dan Warner and Lee Levin, under their stagename Los Gringos. Doug Emery provided the piano, while Lee Levin performed the percussion and drums instruments and Briang Lang the bass. Roger Silvestre Ramírez and Wendy Pedersen provided additional background vocals on the song, while Andrés Saavedra and Isaías García served as the recording engineers. It is considered by Arjona as an autobiographical song, commenting that it "contains a good dose of the life of my old mand", as a reference to his father, who died in 2011. In an interview, music video director Joaquín Cambre commented that "'Vida' is a sweet song, exciting and bitter nonetheless." Jason Birchmeier from Allmusic praised the song, stating that it "deal[s] with matters of identity and take a long view, concerning themselves with the past as well as the present and raising questions about the future."

== Promotion ==
=== Music video ===
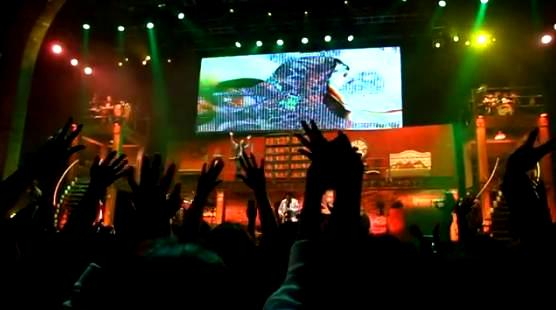
"Vida" was used on Arjona's Metamorfosis World Tour as an introductory video for the show, showcased on an LDC screen present during the concert.

The music video for "Vida" was released on 15 November 2010. It was filmed in Mexico and directed by Argentinian filmmaker Joaquín Cambre. In an interview, Joaquín Cambre commented that he "tried to represent that mix of feelings crafting an ambience of hope inside of a story that inevitably has a tragic end. Ricardo Arjona plays the song while listening to the story playing on an old disc." On the video, Arjona is seen on an old room, playing guitar and sitting on a couch, close to a bed, while singing the lyrics. In between, scenes showing a family reaching to a house, in which the father of the men is laying, close to death. As of 28 July 2012, the video has reached 3.9 million views on YouTube.

=== Live performances and media appearances ===
"Vida" was included on the film Poquita Ropa – Una Historia Apasionada, a compilation of the music videos for all of the songs on the album which premiered in February 2011 by HBO. It was directed by Joaquín Cambre, and co-starred Arjona, González, Edgar Vivar, Daniel Arenas, Mimi Morales, and Kenny. Jesús Grovas, HBO's corporate communication manager for Mexico and Central America said that it was "a pleasure to have on screen the music of a songwriter like Ricardo Arjona, which is warranty of quality". The film was also broadcast by A&E. The song is also present on his ongoing Metamorfosis World Tour, where it is used as an introductory video for the show, showcased on an LDC screen present during the concert.

== Trackslisting ==
- Digital Download
1. "Vida" — 5:15

== Credits and personnel ==
The credits are taken from the iTunes exclusive digital booklet.

Personnel

- Ricardo Arjona — Composer, chorus
- Doug Emery — piano, piano arrangements
- Lee Levin — percussion, drums
- Briang Lang — bass
- Roger Silvestre Ramírez — chorus, background vocals
- Wendy Pedersen — background vocals
- Andrés Saavedra — recording engineer
- Isaías García — recording engineer

Technical

- Xarah — Pro Tools
- Chris Zalles — Pro Tools
- Sebastian Krys — mixing engineer
- Gavin Lurseen — mastering engineer
- Reuben Cohen — mastering assistant
- Guido Díaz — sound engineer on "Puente" (Caribe)
- Juan Mario Aracil — sound engineer, mixing engineer on "Puente" (Caribe)
- Ricardo Arjona — creative direction
- Carlos R. Perez — creative direction
- Elasticpeople.com — graphic design

== Release history ==
Digital releases
Country	Date	Format	Label
Worldwide	9 November 2010	Mainstream radio	Warner Music
United States	7 December 2010	Digital download	Warner Music
United Kingdom	7 December 2010	Digital download	Warner Music
Spain	7 December 2010	Digital download	Warner Music
Germany	7 December 2010	Digital download	Warner Music
Italy	7 December 2010	Digital download	Warner Music
Portugal	7 December 2010	Digital download	Warner Music
Brazil	7 December 2010	Digital download	Warner Music
Mexico	7 December 2010	Digital download	Warner Music
