= Puente (song) =

Single by Ricardo Arjona

from the album Poquita Ropa
- Released: July 26, 2010
- Recorded: 2010
- Genre: Latin pop
- Length: 8:29 (Album Version); 4:46 (Album Version)
- Label: Warner Latina
- Songwriter: Ricardo Arjona
- Producers: Ricardo Arjona, Dan Warner

Ricardo Arjona singles chronology
"Tocando Fondo" (2009)	"Puente" (2010)	"Vida" (2010)

"Puente" is a latin pop song by Guatemalan recording artist Ricardo Arjona, released on July 26, 2010 as the lead single from his twelfth studio album, Poquita Ropa (2010). The song was written by Arjona, who produced it with longtime collaborators Dan Warner and Lee Levin under their stage name Los Gringos. Two versions of the song were made, one of them being a mixture of salsa, merengue along with Cuban music influences; and the other an acoustic version made with piano and percussion.

Lyrically, "Puente" is a song related to the actual situation of Cuba and the immigration to the United States. The song received critical praise, with a critic stating that it "brings the album to an extraordinary conclusion", and received comparisons with Fito Páez's song "Habana". Commercially, "Puente" did not attain commercial success, managing only to reach number 36 on the US Billboard Latin Pop Songs chart.

An accompanying music video for "Puente" was released in July 2010. It was directed by Joaquín Cambré and filmed between Mexico and Argentina. The clip, which showcases the problematic issues of migration in Cuba, was filmed by Arjona while he was on the Quinto Piso Tour with the collaboration of children from 5 to 13 age old. As of 11 July 2012, the video has reached 1.4 million views on YouTube.

== Background ==
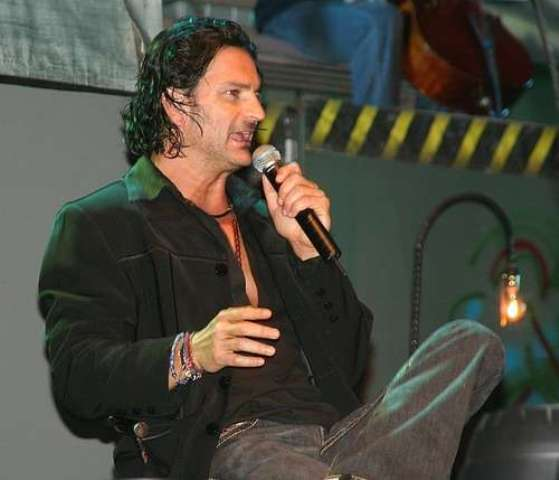
In Poquita Ropa Arjona tried to use as few instruments as possible.

With Poquita Ropa, Arjona wanted to drastically change his musical style. He tried to use as few instruments as possible, resulting in a production that sounds like a capella performances. Arjona said about the album, "music and women look better with little clothes", and that "they [the songs] are like women; they get things up and are so concerned about this that they forget that the less clothes, more beauty. The songs are often overwhelmed by ourselves, because we saturate them with arrangements looking to exalt their qualities and we end up hiding them."

Arjona produced the album with the assistance of Dan Warner, who has worked with Shakira, Celine Dion and Christina Aguilera. Jason Birchmeier from Allmusic commented that Poquita Ropa "finds Arjona at his most naked, backed by spare arrangements of acoustic guitar, piano, and Hammond B-3 along with occasional touches of strings, woodwinds, and chorus vocals." Poquita Ropa was the first album that Arjona recorded without producer Tommy Torres, whose last production was 5to Piso (2008). The album is similar in style to Arjona's work on Galería Caribe (2000).

== Composition ==
"Puente" is a latin pop song with salsa, merengue and Cuban music influences crafted in eight and a half minutes and divided in three parts. The first one is an a cappella song, sang mainly with a piano. The second part is a ballad with Caribbean and Latin sounds, with some salsa and Cuban influences. The third is a mixture of salsa and merengue, with Cuban influences. The song was written by Arjona, who produced it alongside longtime collaborators Dan Warner and Lee Levin, under their stagename Los Gringos. Mónica Maristain from newspaper La Nación compared it with a song released by Fito Páez in 1999, "Habana". Jason Birchmeier from Allmusic praised the song, stating that it "brings the album to an extraordinary conclusion."

In the song, Arjona sings: "Habana / siempre en las mitades, tan mitad española, tan mitad africana / saben bien las olas que en cada ventana siempre hay un testigo / Habana." He also said that "Puente" was the only song that was "not allowed to undress". When asked about "Puente"'s main theme, Arjona commented, "Although many believe is a threshed topic, it isn't for a Cuban, be it on the island or Florida. The status of this dispute hasn't changed since 1959 and I've never seen something as disgusting as a rivalry between people occasioned from politics. Chávez can fight with Uribe, Fidel with Obama, but what has this to do with two third-generation cousins that inherit an enmity for a politic matter[?]".

== Music video ==
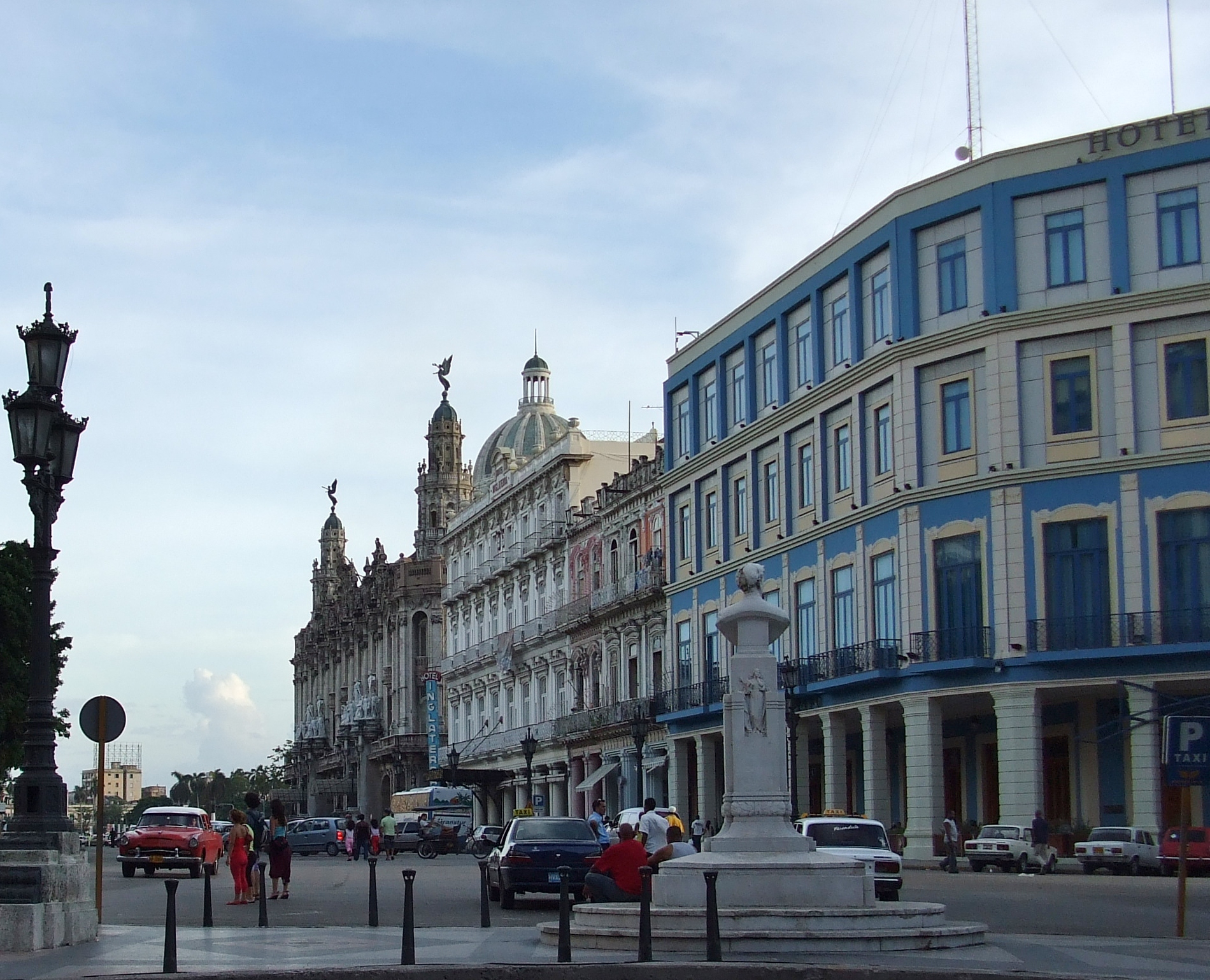
The music video for "Puente" showcases the problematic about the migration on Cuba, shown as "an array of images that tell the same story in opposite realities".

The music video for "Puente" was released on 16 August 2010. It was directed by Argentinian director Joaquín Cambre, who also worked with Arjona on the music video for "Sin Ti, Sin Mi". In the video, to brothers live separately, one of them in La Havana, and the other in Miami, Florida. The video ends with the boys encountering each other in a bridge, along many other people. The video shows the problematic about the migration on Cuba. Arjona shot the video while on his Quinto Piso Tour. It was filmed between Mexico and Argentina, with the collaboration of children from 5 to 13 age old. Coambre commented about the video that ""Puente" for me is an array of images that tell the same story in opposite realities. Two boys exactly alike; one lives in an abandoned hotel on the beach and the other lives in a big city skyscraper, yet both are equally lonely. Miami and Havana are where those two boys are in their own worlds and see that the only way out of their realms are when they decide to encounter one another."

The video starts showing Arjona inside a room powering on an old video projector and singing while watching a black and white film projected on the wall. This scenes are shown until the music style of the song changes into salsa. Then, after the musical change, scenes of two twin brothers are shown, interpolated, one of them living in Havana, the other living in Miami, Florida. The following scenes show the technological differences to which the brothers are attached, before going into the musical change to merengue and cuban music, on which two large group of kids, led by the two brothers, are shown sprinting throughout two shores until they meet and start to celebrate. Then, the final musical change is shown, along a collage of different scenes from the United States and Cuba. Finally, Arjona is shown again sit along the video projector, and the clip ends. As of 14 July 2012, the video has reached 1.4 million views on YouTube.

== Trackslisting ==
- Digital Download
1. "Puente" (Caribe) — 8:29
- Digital Download — Acoustic
1. "Puente" (Acoustic) — 4:46

== Credits and personnel ==
The credits are taken from the iTunes exclusive digital booklet.

"Puente" (Acoustic)

- Ricardo Arjona — Composer, chorus
- Dan Warner — guitars, mandoline
- Matt Rollings — piano, piano arrangements
- Pete Wallace — Hammond B-3, melody
- Lee Levin — percussion, drums
- Briang Lang — bass
- Wendy Pedersen — background vocals
- Roger Silvestre Ramírez — background vocals
- Andrés Saavedra — recording engineer
- Isaías García — recording engineer

"Puente" (Caribe)

- Ricardo Arjona — Composer, chorus
- Dan Warner — guitars
- Matt Rollings — piano, piano arrangements
- Lee Levin — percussion
- Wendy Pedersen — background vocals
- Roger Silvestre Ramírez — background vocals
- Efraín Dávila — arrangements, musical production, acoustic piano, keyboards, programming
- José Tabares — bass
- Luisito Quintero — percussion
- José Sibaja — trumpet
- Ismael Vergara — saxophone (tenor)
- Alberto Barros — trombone
- Ahmed Barroso — tres cubano
- Gianko "Yanko" Gomez — chorus
- Andrés Saavedra — recording engineer
- Isaías García — recording engineer

Technical credits

- Xarah - Pro Tools
- Chris Zalles — Pro Tools
- Sebastian Krys — mixing engineer
- Gavin Lurseen — mastering engineer
- Reuben Cohen — mastering assistant
- Guido Díaz — sound engineer on "Puente" (Caribe)
- Juan Mario Aracil — sound engineer, mixing engineer on "Puente" (Caribe)
- Ricardo Arjona — creative direction
- Carlos R. Perez — creative direction
- Elasticpeople.com — graphic design

== Charts ==
Chart (2010)	Peak position
Latin Pop Songs (Billboard)	36

== Release history ==
Digital releases
Country	Date	Format	Label	Version
Canada	9 August 2010	Digital download	Warner Music	Standard Version
United States	9 August 2010	Digital download	Warner Music	Standard Version
Spain	9 August 2010	Digital download	Warner Music	Standard Version
Mexico	9 August 2010	Digital download	Warner Music	Standard Version
France	9 August 2010	Digital download	Warner Music	Standard Version
United Kingdom	9 August 2010	Digital download	Warner Music	Standard Version
Germany	9 August 2010	Digital download	Warner Music	Standard Version
Argentina	9 August 2010	Digital download	Warner Music	Standard Version
United Kingdom	15 August 2010	Digital download	Warner Music	Acoustic Version
