= Sin Ti... Sin Mi =

Single by Ricardo Arjona

from the album 5to Piso
- Released: January 19, 2008
- Recorded: 2008
- Genre: Latin pop
- Length: 4:20
- Label: Warner Music Latina
- Songwriter: Ricardo Arjona
- Producer: Ricardo Arjona

Ricardo Arjona singles chronology
"Como Duele" (2008)	"Sin Ti... Sin Mi" (2008)	"Tocando Fondo" (2009)

"Sin Ti... Sin Mi" is a song written by Guatemalan singer-songwriter Ricardo Arjona for his eleventh studio album, 5to Piso (2008). The song was released as the second single from the album.

== Music video ==
The music video for "Sin Ti... Sin Mi" was filmed on the Argentinian Boxing Federation on Buenos Aires. It was directed by Joaquín Cambre.

On the video, which counted with more than 150 extras and 20 hours of filming, Arjona is seen as the "expectant narrator of the story." Actors Juan Pablo Raba and Sabrina García appear on the music video.

== Trackslisting ==
Digital Download
No.	Title	Writer(s)	Length
1.	"Sin Ti... Sin Mi"	Ricardo Arjona	4:20

== Charts ==
"Sin Ti... Sin Mi" became a commercial success for Arjona. The song reached No.4 on both the Billboard Latin Songs and the Latin Pop Songs charts. It wasn't as successful as its predecessor, "Como Duele", which managed to reach No.2 on the Latin Songs chart, and No.1 on the Latin Pop Songs chart. On the year end charts, "Sin Ti... Sin Mi" was the 43rd best-performing single of 2009 on the Latin Songs chart, and 16th best-performing single on the Latin Pop Songs chart.

=== Weekly charts ===
Chart (2009)	Peak position
US Hot Latin Songs (Billboard)	4
US Latin Pop Airplay (Billboard)	4

=== Yearly charts ===
Chart (2009)	Peak position
US Billboard Latin Songs	43
US Billboard Latin Pop Songs	16

== Release history ==
Country	Date	Format	Label
Worldwide	January 19, 2009	Mainstream radio	Warner Music Latina
