= Poquita Ropa =

Studio album by Ricardo Arjona
- Released: August 24, 2010
- Recorded: 2009–10; Miami, FL (Picks & Hammers, The Tiki Room, GML Recording Studios); Fort Lauderdale, FL (Cutting Cane Studios); Mexico City (Antigua Studios); Union, NJ (Skylight Studios)
- Genre: Latin pop
- Length: 58:15
- Label: Warner Music
- Producers: Ricardo Arjona, Dan Warner

Ricardo Arjona chronology
Trópico (2009)	Poquita Ropa (2010)	Independiente (2011)

Singles from Poquita ropa
- 1. "Puente" Released: July 26, 2010; 2. "Vida" Released: November 8, 2010; 3. "Marta" Released: March 21, 2011

Poquita Ropa (English: Few Clothes) is the twelfth studio album by Guatemalan singer-songwriter Ricardo Arjona. It was released on August 24, 2010, through Warner Music, and was recorded in Mexico City, New York City, and Los Angeles. The album was produced by Lee Levin and Dan Warner, under their production name "Los Sobaquina", with additional works from Matt Rollings and Brian Lang.

Markedly different in style from his previous albums, Poquita Ropa was produced using as few musical instruments as possible. Arjona's goal was to produce the songs "almost as they were born"; he achieved this by using nonexistent sounds to make the songs sound more acoustic. Arjona achieved a production style that made the songs sound like a cappella performances, and he said that "music and women look better with little clothes."

The album was critically and commercially successful, became his third number one album on the Billboard Top Latin Albums and Latin Pop Albums chart, and also topped the charts in Argentina and Mexico. It was certified Platinum in Argentina and Mexico, and was certified Gold in Chile, Colombia and the United States. The album was nominated at the 53rd Grammy Awards for Best Latin Pop Album. Poquita Ropa was given generally positive reviews; Jason Birchmeier of Allmusic considered the album a "stripped-down acoustic effort" and said that it was "impressive".

Poquita Ropa spawned three singles. "Puente", a song with Cuban influences, was released as the lead single from the album and peaked at number 36 on the Billboard Latin Pop Songs chart. The other two singles released were "Vida" and "Marta", both of which failed to appear on the charts. Instead of promoting the album with a worldwide tour, Arjona produced an eponymous film which was broadcast on HBO and A&E. It was directed by Joaquín Cambre, and features Mexican telenovela actress Edith González.

== Composition ==
"The musicians and engineers who were involved in [the recording process of] Poquita Ropa, they are the best of Los Angeles, Nashville and Miami. This is very important for an artist that has nothing to prove and that constantly breaks the rules of commercial music."

—Dan Warner.

With Poquita Ropa, Arjona wanted to drastically change his musical style. He tried to use as few instruments as possible, resulting in a production that sounds like a cappella performances. Arjona said about the album, "music and women look better with little clothes", and that "they [the songs] are like women; they get things up and are so concerned about this that they forget that the less clothes, more beauty. The songs are often overwhelmed by ourselves, because we saturate them with arrangements looking to exalt their qualities and we end up hiding them."

Arjona produced the album with the assistance of Dan Warner, who has worked with Shakira, Celine Dion and Christina Aguilera. Jason Birchmeier from Allmusic commented that Poquita Ropa "finds Arjona at his most naked, backed by spare arrangements of acoustic guitar, piano, and Hammond B-3 along with occasional touches of strings, woodwinds, and chorus vocals." Poquita Ropa was the first album that Arjona recorded without producer Tommy Torres, whose last production was 5to Piso (2008). The album is similar in style to Arjona's work on Galería Caribe (2000).

"Puente", the lead single, is eight minutes and thirty seconds long and is divided into three parts. The first part is an a cappella song with a piano accompaniment. The second part is a ballad with Caribbean and Latin sounds, with some salsa and Cuban influences. The third is a mixture of salsa and merengue, with Cuban influences. Mónica Maristain from newspaper La Nación compared it with "Habana", a 1999 song by Fito Páez.

== Lyrical content ==
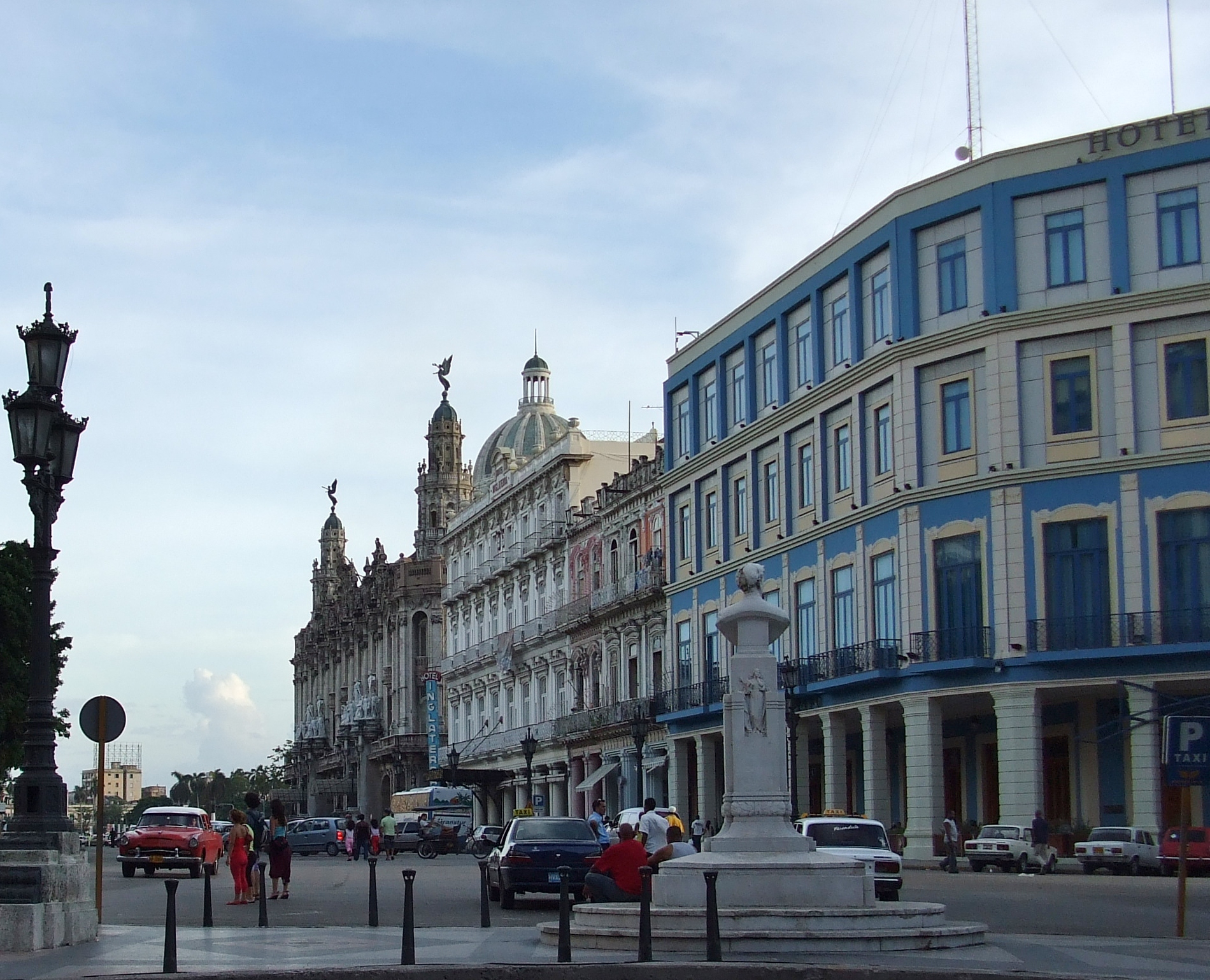
La Habana is the main theme in lead single "Puente", which talks about two separated brothers.

When asked about "Puente"'s main theme, Arjona commented, "Although many believe is a threshed topic, it isn't for a Cuban, be it on the island or Florida. The status of this dispute hasn't changed since 1959 and I've never seen something as disgusting as a rivalry between people occasioned from politics. Chávez can fight with Uribe, Fidel with Obama, but what has this to do with two third-generation cousins that inherit an enmity for a politic matter[?]". In the song, Arjona sings: "Habana / siempre en las mitades, tan mitad española, tan mitad africana / saben bien las olas que en cada ventana siempre hay un testigo / Habana." He also said that "Puente" was the only song that was "not allowed to undress".

"Vida", the second single, is considered by Arjona to be an autobiographical song. He said that it "contains a good dose of the life of my old man", as a reference to his father, Don Ricardo Arjona, who died in 2010. In an interview, music video director Joaquín Cambre said that, " 'Vida' is a sweet song, exciting and bitter nonetheless. I tried to represent that mix of feelings crafting an ambience of hope inside of a story that inevitably has a tragic end. Ricardo Arjona plays the song while listening to the story playing on an old disc." Arjona said that "Marta" is "one of those songs with brushworks related to something that happened, put on the magnifying glass of the author." When asked if "Escribir Una Canción" could be considered a guide for songwriters, he stated that "there are no guides to write songs. If any, songwriters would stop writing songs and start writing guides."

Arjona also said that "Mi País" was "the story of anybody who left their land and searched for life in another place, with all that huge dose of nostalgia and memory those moments carries.", and that he wrote the song when he left Guatemala. "Que Voy A Hacer Conmigo" was originally included as a rock song on his 1991 album Del Otro Lado del Sol, but the lyrics were slightly changed on the new version. Arjona stated that it was a difficult process to leave the songs "almost as they were born", and that he had to convince the people who worked on the album that "it was the way the songs were to be", without adding any sounds.

== Release and promotion ==
Poquita Ropa was released first in Spain on 6 August 2010, and was made available in the United States, Latin America, and the rest of Europe on 15 August 2010. The compact disc version of the album was released in the United States, the United Kingdom, and Latin America on 24 August 2010. A deluxe edition was released on iTunes, and contained the track "Estas Ganas de Llorar".

=== Singles ===
"Marta"
A sample of "Marta", including the first chorus sung by Arjona.

"Puente", the lead single from the album, was released on 9 August 2010. The song is a political-charged anthem to Havana, the relationship between Cuba and the United States, the international economic blockade against Cuba, and Cuban emigration to Florida. The song reached number 36 on the Billboard Latin Pop Songs chart. "Puente" is one of Arjona's least successful lead singles. The music video was filmed in Mexico and Argentina. The second single, "Vida", was released on 7 December 2010. Its music video was filmed in Mexico and was directed by Argentinian filmmaker Joaquín Cambre. The third and last single from the album was "Marta", released on 29 March 2011. It became the second consecutive single from Poquita Ropa to fail to chart in the United States. The accompanying music video featured Mexican telenovela actress Edith González.

=== Film ===
On 12 February 2011, HBO premiered the film Poquita Ropa – Una Historia Apasionada, a compilation of the music videos for all of the songs on the album, interlaced into one story and with a duration of 67 minutes. It was directed by Joaquín Cambre, and co-starred Arjona, González, Edgar Vivar, Daniel Arenas, Mimi Morales, and Kenny. Poquita Ropa – Una Historia Apasionada was produced in Argentina and Mexico. Jesús Grovas, HBO's corporate communication manager for Mexico and Central America said that it was "a pleasure to have on screen the music of a songwriter like Ricardo Arjona, which is warranty of quality". The film was later broadcast by A&E.

== Reception ==
=== Commercial performance ===
In the United States, Poquita Ropa sold over nine thousand copies in its first week, debuting at number one the Billboard Top Latin Albums chart, on the week ending 11 September 2010, becoming Arjona's third studio album to reach number one on that chart, following Galería Caribe (2000) and 5to Piso (2008). The following week, it fell to number two as Enrique Iglesias' Euphoria regained the top position. Poquita Ropa also debuted at number one on the Latin Pop Albums chart on the week ending 11 September 2010. It became Arjona's fourth album to reach number one, after Galería Caribe, 5to Piso and Quién Dijo Ayer (2007). Poquita Ropa also debuted at number 43 on the Billboard 200, becoming his highest entry on that chart. The album was also commercially successful outside the United States. In Mexico, Poquita Ropa debuted at number 29, and jumped to number one in its second week. It remained at number one for two consecutive weeks, before dropping to number five. The album was the 31st best-selling album of 2010 in Mexico. Poquita Ropa also peaked at number one in Argentina, and at number two in Chile. On the 2010 year-end chart, Poquita Ropa was the 43rd best-selling album on the Latin Albums chart, and the 12th best-selling album on the Latin Pop Albums chart.

Poquita Ropa was certified Platinum by the Argentine Chamber of Phonograms and Videograms Producers (CAPIF), denoting 40,000 copies sold. It was also certified Platinum by the Mexican Association of Producers of Phonograms and Videograms (AMPROFON), denoting 60,000 copies sold. In the United States, Poquita Ropa was certified Gold (Latin) by the Recording Industry Association of America (RIAA), denoting 50,000 copies shipped. It was certified Gold in Chile, denoting sales of 5,000 copies, and in Colombia, denoting sales of 10,000 copies.

=== Critical response ===
Professional ratings
Review scores
Source	Rating
Allmusic	3.5/5 stars

Jason Birchmeier of Allmusic gave the album a positive review, and wrote that it was a "stripped-down acoustic effort", and considered it "impressive". An editor from El Carabobeño said that Poquita Ropa was "an album of ghetto and concept, with flawless production and carried out with the right amount of instruments."

== Track listing ==
Following, the track list of Poquita Ropa as is shown in Allmusic.

All songs written and composed by Ricardo Arjona.

No.	Title	Length
1.	"Vida"	5:15
2.	"Marta"	5:51
3.	"Aleluya"	4:22
4.	"Soledad Enamorada"	4:24
5.	"Que Voy a Hacer Conmigo"	3:49
6.	"Escribir Una Canción"	4:34
7.	"Usted"	3:16
8.	"Puente (acoustic)"	4:47
9.	"Todo Estará Bien"	3:30
10.	"Mi País"	4:27
11.	"Por Tanto Amarte"	4:03
12.	"Puente (caribe)"	8:30

iTunes Bonus Track

No.	Title	Length
13.	"Estas Ganas de Llorar"	3:45

=== Notes ===
- "Que Voy A Hacer Conmigo", with slightly different lyrics, appeared on Arjona's 1991 album Del Otro Lado del Sol.

== Personnel ==
The credits are taken from the iTunes exclusive digital booklet.

"Vida"

- Ricardo Arjona — Composer, chorus
- Doug Emery — piano, piano arrangements
- Lee Levin — percussion, drums
- Briang Lang — bass
- Roger Silvestre Ramírez — chorus, background vocals
- Wendy Pedersen — background vocals
- Andrés Saavedra — recording engineer
- Isaías García — recording engineer

"Marta"

- Ricardo Arjona — Composer, chorus
- Matt Rollings — piano, piano arrangements, Hammond B-3
- Doug Emery — Hammond B-3
- Lee Levin — percussion, drums
- Briang Lang — bass
- Roger Silvestre Ramírez — chorus, background vocals
- Wendy Pedersen — background vocals
- Andrés Saavedra — recording engineer
- Isaías García — recording engineer

"Aleluya"

- Ricardo Arjona — Composer, chorus
- Dan Warner - guitars, mandoline
- Matt Rollings — piano, piano arrangements
- Lee Levin — percussion
- Jonathan Yudkin — violin
- Roger Silvestre Ramírez — chorus, background vocals
- Wendy Pedersen — background vocals
- Andrés Saavedra — recording engineer
- Isaías García — recording engineer

"Soledad Enamorada"

- Ricardo Arjona — Composer, chorus
- Dan Warner — guitars
- Victor Patrón — piano, piano arrangements
- Lee Levin — percussion
- Roger Silvestre Ramírez — background vocals
- Wendy Pedersen — background vocals
- Andrés Saavedra — recording engineer
- Isaías García — recording engineer

"Que Voy A Hacer Conmigo"

- Ricardo Arjona — Composer, chorus
- Dan Warner — guitars
- Matt Rollings — piano, piano arrangements
- Pete Wallace — Hammond B-3
- Lee Levin — percussion
- Wendy Pedersen — background vocals
- Roger Silvestre Ramírez — background vocals
- Andrés Saavedra — recording engineer
- Isaías García — recording engineer

"Escribir Una Canción"

- Ricardo Arjona — Composer, chorus
- Dan Warner — guitars
- Matt Rollings — piano, piano arrangements
- Lee Levin — percussion
- Wendy Pedersen — background vocals
- Roger Silvestre Ramírez — background vocals
- Andrés Saavedra — recording engineer
- Isaías García — recording engineer

"Usted"

- Ricardo Arjona — Composer, chorus
- Dan Warner — guitars
- Matt Rollings — piano, piano arrangements
- Pete Wallace — Hammond B-3
- Lee Levin — percussion
- Wendy Pedersen — background vocals
- Roger Silvestre Ramírez — background vocals
- Andrés Saavedra — recording engineer
- Isaías García — recording engineer

"Puente" (Acoustic)

- Ricardo Arjona — Composer, chorus
- Dan Warner — guitars, mandoline
- Matt Rollings — piano, piano arrangements
- Pete Wallace — Hammond B-3, melody
- Lee Levin — percussion, drums
- Briang Lang — bass
- Wendy Pedersen — background vocals
- Roger Silvestre Ramírez — background vocals
- Andrés Saavedra — recording engineer
- Isaías García — recording engineer

"Todo Estará Bién"

- Ricardo Arjona — Composer, chorus
- Dan Warner — guitars
- Matt Rollings — piano, piano arrangements
- Lee Levin — percussion
- Jonathan Yudkin — cello, mandoline
- Wendy Pedersen — background vocals
- Roger Silvestre Ramírez — background vocals
- Andrés Saavedra — recording engineer
- Isaías García — recording engineer

"Mi País"

- Ricardo Arjona — Composer, chorus
- Dan Warner — guitars
- Matt Rollings — piano, piano arrangements
- Doug Emery — Hammond B-3
- Lee Levin — percussion
- Wendy Pedersen — background vocals
- Roger Silvestre Ramírez — background vocals
- Andrés Saavedra — recording engineer
- Isaías García — recording engineer

"Por Tanto Amarte"

- Ricardo Arjona — Composer, chorus
- Carlos Cabral Jr. — guitars
- Matt Rollings — piano, piano arrangements
- Lee Levin — percussion
- Fernando Acosta — clarinet
- Wendy Pedersen — background vocals
- Roger Silvestre Ramírez — background vocals
- Andrés Saavedra — recording engineer
- Isaías García — recording engineer

"Puente" (Caribe)

- Ricardo Arjona — Composer, chorus
- Dan Warner — guitars
- Matt Rollings — piano, piano arrangements
- Lee Levin — percussion
- Wendy Pedersen — background vocals
- Roger Silvestre Ramírez — background vocals
- Efraín Dávila — arrangements, musical production, acoustic piano, keyboards, programming
- José Tabares — bass
- Luisito Quintero — percussion
- José Sibaja — trumpet
- Ismael Vergara — saxophone (tenor)
- Alberto Barros — trombone
- Ahmed Barroso — tres cubano
- Gianko "Yanko" Gomez — chorus
- Andrés Saavedra — recording engineer
- Isaías García — recording engineer

=== Technical credits ===
- Xarah — Pro Tools
- Chris Zalles — Pro Tools
- Sebastian Krys — mixing engineer
- Gavin Lurseen — mastering engineer
- Reuben Cohen — mastering assistant
- Guido Díaz — sound engineer on "Puente" (Caribe)
- Juan Mario Aracil — sound engineer, mixing engineer on "Puente" (Caribe)
- Ricardo Arjona — creative direction
- Carlos R. Perez — creative direction
- Elasticpeople.com — graphic design

== Chart performance ==
=== Weekly charts ===
Chart (2010)	Peak position
Argentine Albums (CAPIF)	1
Chilean Albums (IFPI)	2
Mexican Albums (Top 100 Mexico)	1
Spanish Albums (Promusicae)	18
US Top Latin Albums (Billboard)	1
US Latin Pop Albums (Billboard)	1
US Billboard 200	43

=== Yearly charts ===
Chart (2010)	Peak position
US Billboard Top Latin Albums	43
US Billboard Latin Pop Albums	12
Mexican Album Charts	31

=== Sales and certifications ===
Region	Certification	Certified units/sales	
	Argentina (CAPIF)	Platinum	40,000^{^}
Chile (IFPI)	Gold	5,000^{^}	
Colombia (ACPF)	Gold	5,000^{*}	
	Mexico (AMPROFON)	Platinum	60,000^{^}
^{^} Shipments figures based on certification alone.

== Release history ==
Country	Date	Format(s)	Label
Spain	August 6, 2010	CD	Warner Music Group
United States	August 15, 2010	Digital download	Warner Music Group
Spain	August 15, 2010	Digital download	Warner Music Group
Mexico	August 15, 2010	Digital download	Warner Music Group
Argentina	August 15, 2010	Digital download	Warner Music Group
Brazil	August 15, 2010	Digital download	Warner Music Group
Canada	August 15, 2010	Digital download	Warner Music Group
Guatemala	August 15, 2010	Digital download	Warner Music Group
Chile	August 15, 2010	Digital download	Warner Music Group
Venezuela	August 15, 2010	Digital download	Warner Music Group
Colombia	August 15, 2010	Digital download	Warner Music Group
United Kingdom	August 15, 2010	Digital download	Warner Music Group
Italy	August 15, 2010	Digital download	Warner Music Group
United States	August 24, 2010	CD	Warner Music Group
United Kingdom	August 24, 2010	CD	Warner Music Group

== See also ==
- 2010 in Latin music
- List of number-one albums of 2010 (Mexico)
- List of number-one Billboard Latin Pop Albums of 2010
- List of number-one Billboard Latin Albums from the 2010s
