= Mario Pacheco =

Mario Pacheco (6 November 1950 – 26 November 2010) was a Spanish record producer, photographer and entrepreneur.

Born in Madrid, in 1982 he founded Nuevos Medios, a record label that introduced numerous guitarists, singers and other flamenco notables through his vision in furthering the genre worldwide. Besides this, he was also a professional photographer.

Through his company, Pacheco released albums by some of the most significant flamenco artists of the period: Carles Benavent, Diego Carrasco, Jorge Pardo, Ketama, La Macanita, Pata Negra, Golpes Bajos, Martirio, Ray Heredia and La Barbería del Sur, among others.

In addition, he released assorted music created by British rock groups Joy Division, New Order and the Smiths; minimalist musician Steve Reich; jazzists Bill Evans, Keith Jarrett, Pat Metheny and Art Pepper, and Cuban music compilations of Bola de Nieve and Benny Moré. He also mixed compilations of his label artists in the series Los Jóvenes Flamencos.

At the time of his death from cancer in Madrid, Pacheco was the president of the Unión Fonográfica Independiente (UFI), the association of Spanish independent labels.
