= Hugo Guerrero Marthineitz =

Peruvian journalist, commentator and radio host

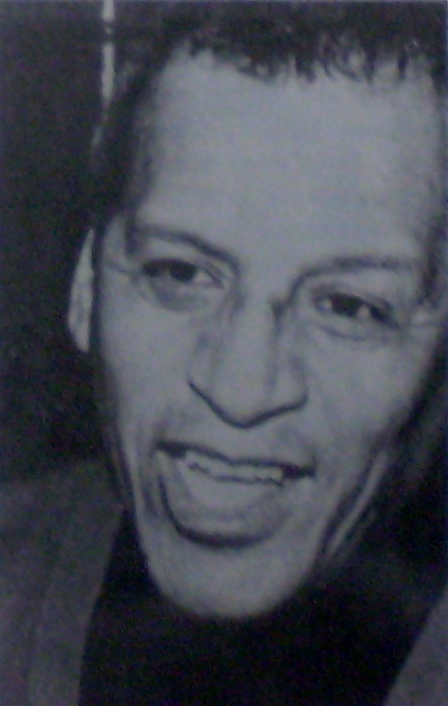
Hugo Guerrero Martinheitz

Hugo Tomás Tiburcio Adelmar Guerrero de Ávila Marthineitz (August 1924, in Lima – 21 August 2010, in Buenos Aires) was a Peruvian journalist, commentator and radio host, who spent most of his professional career in Argentina.

== Life and work ==
Hugo Guerrero Marthineitz was born in Lima, Peru, to Lorenzo Guerrero, the son of mestizo-West Indian parents. Politically active during his secondary school studies, Guerrero was forced to go into hiding for a time in 1941; that year, however, he had found his calling in radio broadcasting, and soon became one of Lima's most recognizable radio voices, hosting a news and commentary program on Radio Programas del Perú.

Guerrero Marthineitz left Lima for Buenos Aires, Argentina, in 1955, and later settled in neighboring Montevideo, Uruguay. He returned to Buenos Aires, at the time the World's leading center of Spanish-language broadcasting, in 1964. His successful career in Lima quickly opened doors for him in Argentine radio and he soon hosted El show del minuto ("The Show of the Minute"), centering around literary reviews and talk. The show's success earned him his first television show, Séptima noche ("Seventh Night"). Enjoying high ratings, a 1967 interview with writer Dalmiro Sáenz resulted in its termination when the outspoken writer openly praised Fidel Castro. The same dictatorship that had Séptima noche pulled, ordered the suspension of El show del minuto in 1970. Guerrero Marthineitz was, however, soon given a prime-time news and commentary program in Buenos Aires' Radio Belgrano, propelling it to record ratings, even after the advent of Argentina's repressive last dictatorship in 1976. His program combined interviews, debate and commentary, as well as his thorough reviews of the day's music, theatre and film. He received a KONEX Award (Argentine broadcasting's highest honor) for his program in 1981.

Guerrero Marthineitz was placed under active surveillance by the military regime and he avoided provocations during his popular programs, preferring instead to leave audiences with subtle asides hinting at the day's climate of fear. His show began to decline in popularity following Argentina's return to democracy in 1983, in part owing to the sudden explosion of variety in local programming. In a bid to rescue falling ratings, he signed a television contract to host A solas ("Solo Encounter"); but his no-frills format helped lead to low ratings and the show's cancellation. His career declined steadily afterwards, particularly after a 1992 altercation he involved himself in when television talk show host Mauro Viale baited Guerrero regarding his half-Jewish background, to which he replied: I need no lectures from you, Mr. Goldfarb (referring to Viale's real Jewish surname).

He returned to a television talk show format with his Reencuentro a solas ("Solo Re-encounter") in 1996, a promising return derailed by his increasing irascibility. A dispute with Mirtha Legrand (arguably the most influential woman in Argentine television) and musician José Larralde led to the show's closure that October. Returning to radio, he hosted Guerrero de noche ("Guerrero at Night") on Radio del Plata; but, in 1998, the evening program was canceled. The following year, his wife filed for divorce and Guerrero Marthineitz, a long-time smoker, was diagnosed with bladder cancer. The renowned radio host seriously considered returning to his family property in Lima when, in late 2000, he was offered a co-hosting position by popular Buenos Aires television personality Samuel Gelblung ("Chiche"). The show, Edición Chiche ("Chiche's Edition"), saw its ratings soar.

His health recovered, Guerrero Marthineitz returned to his classic Encuentro a solas. He retired from regular broadcasting in 2006, though he returned to the medium amid personal financial problems in 2009 with Radio Rivadavia's Ahí donde está el silencio, and at the kindness of his earlier foe, Mauro Viale. Guerrero continued to host cultural events. His precise, unhurried speech, his carefully timed laughter and silences, attention to detail and intimate narrations recall literary readings (which he still hosts), rather than radio or television programs and made Guerrero, an immigrant with an unmistakable accent, one of the most influential radio personalities in Argentina.

== Death ==
Both Guerrero Marthineitz's finances and health deteriorated quickly during 2009 and 2010, when a dearth in radio contracts and his inability to collect back pay resulted in his becoming homeless. Among those the noted emcee alleged to have owed him thousands of pesos were the government of San Luis Province and Mauro Viale, with whom Guerrero was reportedly engaged in a fistfight shortly after his May 2010 eviction. Guerrero was taken to a Buenos Aires psychiatric clinic in July, and died there in August of cardiac arrest at age 86.
