= Zeferino Nandayapa =

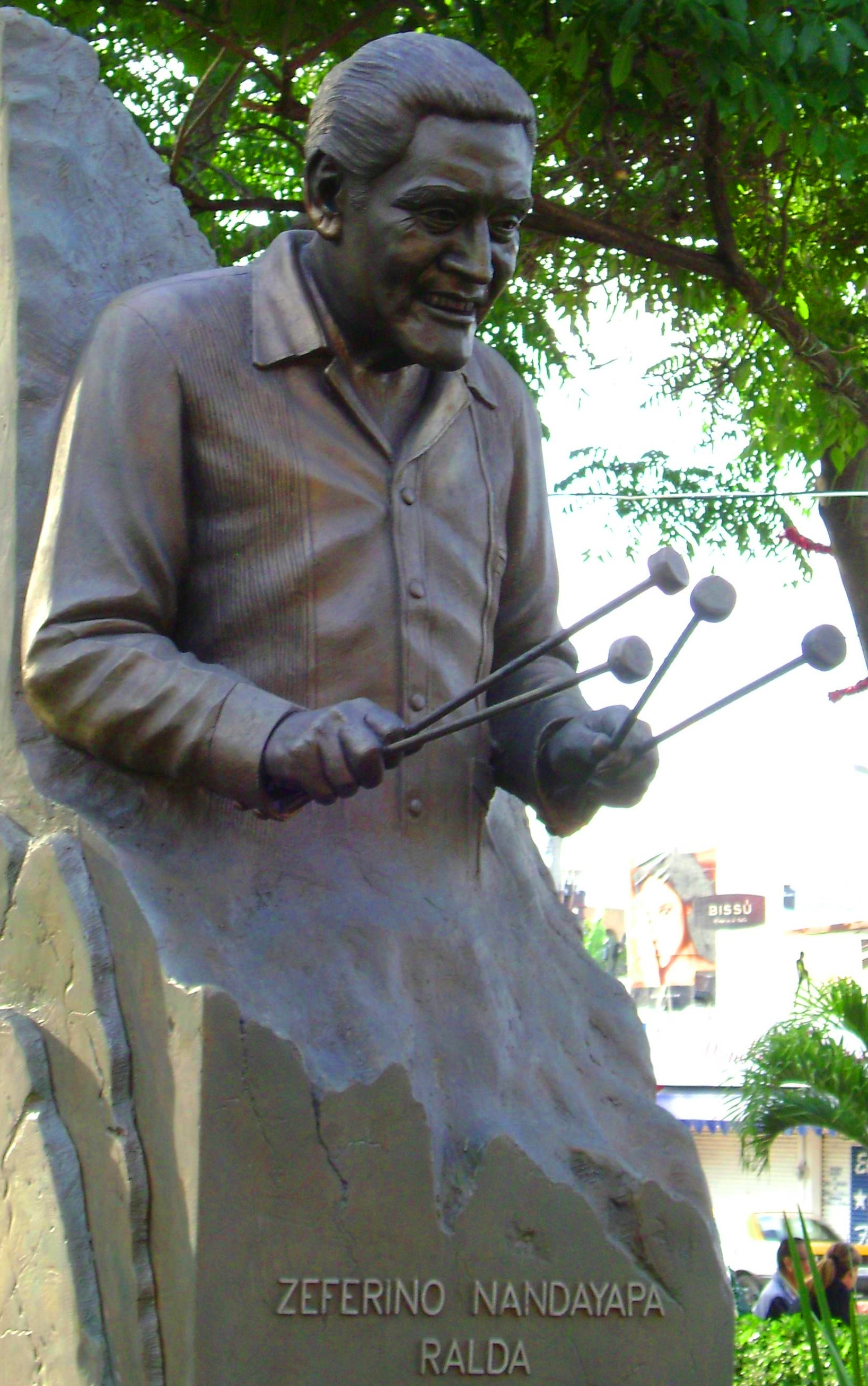
Statue of Zeferino Nandayapa-Ralda.

Zeferino Nandayapa (born 26 August 1931, Copainalá – died 28 December 2010, Tlalnepantla) was a Mexican folk and classical marimba player. In Mexico City, his classical music teachers were Blas Galindo, María García Genda, Carlos Chávez and Carlos Jiménez Mabarak. He formed the Marimba Nandayapa in 1956, a popular marimba band that has traveled to several countries performing Mexican and Latin-American folk music. Zeferino Nandayapa has been a soloist with the Royal Philharmonic Orchestra in London, and the Community of Madrid Orchestra.

== Death ==
Nandayapa died on 28 December 2010 caused by a fatal slip, aged 79, in Tlalnepantla.
