= Quinto Piso Tour =

2009–10 concert tour by Ricardo Arjona

- Tour by Ricardo Arjona
- Promotional poster for the tour
- Associated album: Quinto Piso
- Start date: April 24, 2009
- End date: June 18, 2010
- Legs: 2
- No. of shows: 5 in Europe; 118 in the Americas; 123 in total
- Box office: $15 million (2009)

Ricardo Arjona concert chronology
- Adentro Tour (2007); Quinto Piso Tour (2009–10); Metamorfosis World Tour (2012)

Quinto Piso Tour was a worldwide concert tour by Guatemalan singer–songwriter Ricardo Arjona, in support of his eleventh studio album, Quinto Piso.

The tour visited the United States, Spain, Argentina, Guatemala, Colombia, Venezuela, Mexico, Honduras, Puerto Rico, El Salvador, Canada, Peru, Dominican Republic, Costa Rica, Panama, Chile, Uruguay, Bolivia and Paraguay. The concert had 91 shows throughout 2009 and 19 shows in 2010 for a total of 110 shows, beginning in Mexico on March 26, 2009 and ending in Bolivia on June 18, 2010.

During the first North American leg of the tour, Arjona expressed interest in singing in Cuba, showing no political commitments for the matter, a clear reference of the event colombian singer Juanes was planning on that country in 2009. Later that year, Arjona cancelled the planning of a concert in the country, and spoke heavily about Juanes' charity concert influence on the decision.

The Quinto Piso Tour has been one of the most successful tours made by a Latin artist, with an attendance of more than one million people from 19 countries. Also, Arjona received in 2010 a Billboard Latin Music Award for "Latin Tour of the Year".

== Tour dates ==
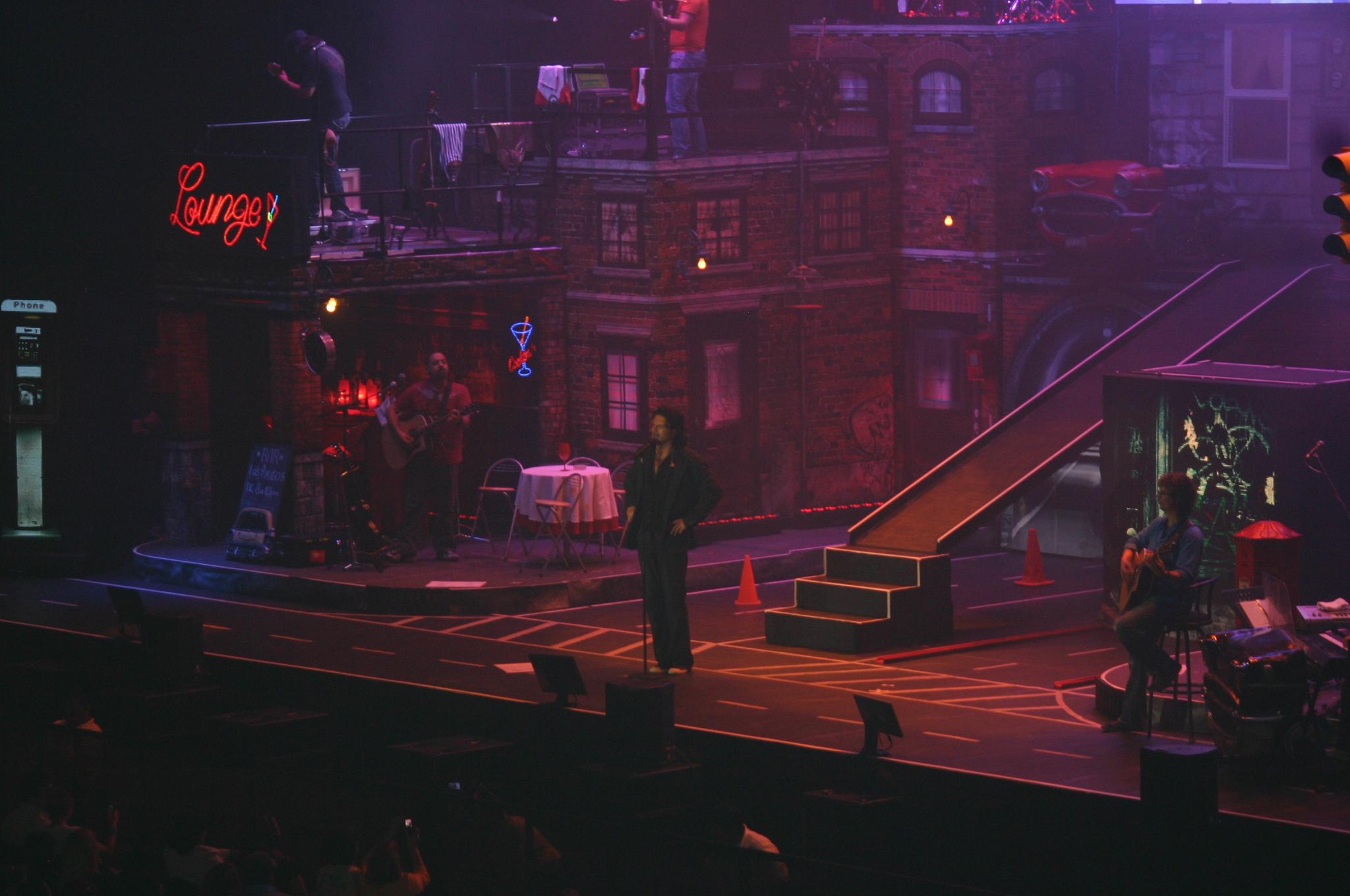
Ricardo Arjona in Laredo, Texas during 5to Piso Tour

Next, the tour dates for the Quinto Piso Tour:

Date	City	Country	Venue
North America
March 26, 2009	Toluca	Mexico	Teatro Morelos
March 28, 2009	Querétaro	Mexico	Auditorio Josefa Ortiz
April 4, 2009	Zacatecas	Mexico	Plaza de Armas
April 5, 2009	Durango	Mexico	La Velaria
April 11, 2009	Acapulco	Mexico	Forum Mundo Imperial
April 18, 2009	Nuevo Laredo	Mexico	Parque la Junta
Europe
April 24, 2009	Barcelona	Spain	Palau Sant Jordi
April 26, 2009	Madrid	Spain	Palacio de los Deportes
April 27, 2009	Valladolid	Spain	Auditorio Feria de Valladolid
April 28, 2009	Madrid	Spain	Palacio de los Deportes
April 30, 2009	Tenerife	Spain	Pabellón Municipal de Deportes
Americas
May 8, 2009	Guadalajara	Mexico	Telmex Auditorium
May 9, 2009	Guadalajara	Mexico	Telmex Auditorium
May 15, 2009	Puebla	Mexico	Universidad Iberoamericana
May 16, 2009	Veracruz	Mexico	Estadio de Baseball
May 17, 2009	Mérida	Mexico	Estadio C. Iturralde
May 22, 2009	San Juan	Puerto Rico	José Miguel Agrelot Coliseum
May 23, 2009	San Juan	Puerto Rico	José Miguel Agrelot Coliseum
May 28, 2009	Santiago de los Caballeros	Dominican Republic	Gran Arena del Cibao
May 30, 2009	Santo Domingo	Dominican Republic	Estadio Olímpico Félix Sánchez
June 4, 2009	Mexico City	Mexico	National Auditorium
June 5, 2009	Mexico City	Mexico	National Auditorium
June 6, 2009	Mexico City	Mexico	National Auditorium
June 7, 2009	Mexico City	Mexico	National Auditorium
June 9, 2009	Guadalajara	Mexico	Telmex Auditorium
June 10, 2009	Guadalajara	Mexico	Telmex Auditorium
June 19, 2009	Mexico City	Mexico	National Auditorium
June 20, 2009	Mexico City	Mexico	National Auditorium
June 24, 2009	Mérida	Mexico	Auditorio de Mérida
June 25, 2009	Piedras Negras	Mexico	Estadio de baseball de la SECC
June 26, 2009	Monterrey	Mexico	Monterrey Arena
June 27, 2009	Monterrey	Mexico	Monterrey Arena
July 4, 2009	San José	Costa Rica	Estadio Ricardo Saprissa Aymá
July 7, 2009	Panama City	Panama	Centro de Convenciones Figali
July 11, 2009	Ensenada	Mexico	Auditorio Nacional
July 17, 2009	Monterrey	Mexico	Monterrey Arena
July 18, 2009	Torreón	Mexico	Coliseo Centenario
July 22, 2009	Quito	Ecuador	Estadio Olímpico Atahualpa
July 24, 2009	Guayaquil	Ecuador	Estadio Modelo Alberto Spencer Herrera
July 26, 2009	Cuenca	Ecuador	Estadio Alejandro Serrano Aguilar
July 30, 2009	Miami	United States	American Airlines Arena
August 1, 2009	Orlando	United States	Amway Arena
August 2, 2009	Duluth	United States	Gwinnett Center
August 7, 2009	New York City	United States	Madison Square Garden
August 8, 2009	Fairfax	United States	Patriot Center
August 12, 2009	Laredo	United States	Laredo Entertainment Center
August 13, 2009	Houston	United States	Toyota Center
August 14, 2009	Grand Prairie	United States	Nokia Theatre Grand Prairie
August 15, 2009	Hidalgo	United States	Dodge Arena
August 16, 2009	San Antonio	United States	AT&T Center
August 21, 2009	Los Angeles	United States	Nokia Theatre L.A. Live
August 22, 2009	Los Angeles	United States	Nokia Theatre L.A. Live
August 23, 2009	Los Angeles	United States	Nokia Theatre L.A. Live
August 24, 2009	Los Angeles	United States	Monitor Latino
August 26, 2009	Seattle	United States	WaMu Theater
August 28, 2009	Palm Springs	United States	Agua Caliente Casino
August 29, 2009	San Diego	United States	San Diego Sports Arena
August 30, 2009	San Jose	United States	HP Pavilion Center
September 4, 2009	Brampton	Canada	Powerade Centre
September 5, 2009	Rosemont	United States	Allstate Arena
September 7, 2009	Boston	United States	Agganis Arena
September 11, 2009	El Paso	United States	El Paso County Coliseum
September 12, 2009	Phoenix	United States	Comerica Theatre
September 13, 2009	Las Vegas	United States	The Joint at the Hard Rock Hotel & Casino
September 17, 2009	Maracaibo	Venezuela	Estadio Luis Aparicio
September 19, 2009	San Cristóbal	Venezuela	Estadio de Beisbol Pueblo Nuevo
September 20, 2009	Barquisimeto	Venezuela	Complejo Ferial
September 23, 2009	Caracas	Venezuela	Teresa Carreño Cultural Complex
September 24, 2009	Puerto la Cruz	Venezuela	Estadio José Antonio Anzoátegui
September 25, 2009	Maturín	Venezuela	Estadio Monumental
September 26, 2009	Puerto Ordaz	Venezuela	Estadio Cachamay
October 2, 2009	Valencia	Venezuela	Estadio Misael Delgado
October 3, 2009	Caracas	Venezuela	Simón Bolívar University
October 4, 2009	Caracas	Venezuela	Simón Bolívar University
October 10, 2009	Mendoza	Argentina	Estadio Malvinas Argentinas
October 12, 2009	Mar del Plata	Argentina	Poliedro Mar del Plata
October 15, 2009	Buenos Aires	Argentina	Estadio Boca Juniors
October 16, 2009	Buenos Aires	Argentina	Estadio Boca Juniors
October 17, 2009	Buenos Aires	Argentina	Estadio Boca Juniors
October 18, 2009	Buenos Aires	Argentina	Estadio Boca Juniors
October 20, 2009	Bahía Blanca	Argentina	Estadio Olimpo
October 23, 2009	Asunción	Paraguay	Estadio Defensores del Chaco
October 25, 2009	Corrientes	Argentina	Estadio Huracán
October 27, 2009	Tucumán		Estadio Central Córdoba
October 29, 2009	Rosario		Estadio Newell's Old Boys
October 30, 2009	Córdoba		Estadio Chateau Carreras
October 31, 2009	Santa Fe		
November 3, 2009	Iquique	Chile	Estadio Tierra de Campeones
November 5, 2009	Santiago de Chile	Chile	Movistar Arena
November 6, 2009	Santiago de Chile	Chile	Movistar Arena
November 7, 2009	Santiago de Chile	Chile	Movistar Arena
November 8, 2009	Santiago de Chile	Chile	Movistar Arena
November 10, 2009	Concepción	Chile	Estadio Municipal
November 12, 2009	Neuquen	Argentina	Casino Magic
November 14, 2009	Trelew	Argentina	Estadio Racing Club de Trelew
November 16, 2009	Rio Gallegos	Argentina	Gimnasio Boxing Club
November 20, 2009	Comodoro Rivadavia	Argentina	
November 28, 2009	Puebla	Mexico	Universidad Iberoamericana
December 2, 2009	San Salvador	El Salvador	Estadio Mágico González
December 4, 2009	Guatemala City	Guatemala	Estadio Mateo Flores
December 10, 2009	Mexico City	Mexico	Auditorio Nacional
December 11, 2009	Mexico City	Mexico	Auditorio Nacional
December 12, 2009	Mexico City	Mexico	Auditorio Nacional
December 18, 2009	Buenos Aires	Argentina	Estadio Boca
Americas
February 13, 2010	San Juan	Puerto Rico	Coliseo José Miguel Agrelot
February 14, 2010	San Juan	Puerto Rico	Coliseo José Miguel Agrelot
February 20, 2010	Villa María	Argentina	
February 22, 2010	San Juan	Argentina	Estadio Abierto
March 4, 2010	Montevideo	Uruguay	Estadio Centenario
March 7, 2010	Paraná	Argentina	Feria de las Colectividades
April 7, 2010	Medellín	Colombia	Plaza de Toros La Macarena
April 14, 2010	Bogotá	Colombia	Coliseo El Campín
April 15, 2010	Bogotá	Colombia	Coliseo El Campín
April 17, 2010	Cali	Colombia	Plaza de Toros Cañaveralejo
April 24, 2010	Lima	Peru	Explanada del Estadio Monumental
May 2, 2010	Santiago de Chile	Chile	Movistar Arena
May 3, 2010	Santiago de Chile	Chile	Movistar Arena
May 8, 2010	Tijuana	Mexico	Plaza Monumental
May 11, 2010	Hermosillo	Mexico	Expoforum
May 15, 2010	León	Mexico	Poliforum
May 16, 2010	Guadalajara	Mexico	Arena Telmex
May 29, 2010	Tegucigalpa	Honduras	Estadio Chochi Sosa
June 18, 2010	Santa Cruz	Bolivia	Estadio Tahuichi Aguilera

== Box office ==
Venue	City	Tickets sold / available	Gross revenue
José Miguel Agrelot Coliseum	San Juan	10,553 / 19,162 (55%)	$936,813
Estadio Olímpico Atahualpa	Quito	22,610 / 33,000 (68%)	$789,141
Estadio Alejandro Serrano Aguilar	Cuenca	6,979 / 17,000 (41%)	$201,065
Estadio Luis Aparicio	Maracaibo	5,567 / 8,600 (64%)	$490,717
Plaza de Toros	San Cristóbal	5,682 / 9,666 (58%)	$267,875
Estadio Monumental	Maturín	5,553 / 9,450 (58%)	$326,134
Teresa Carreño Cultural Complex	Caracas	1,240 / 1,800 (68%)	$416,364
Estadio Modelo Alberto Spencer Herrera	Guayaquil	21,761 / 33,000 (65%)	$830,053
Hard Rock Hotel and Casino	Las Vegas	1,681 / 2,411 (69%)	$185,522
Nokia Theatre L.A. Live	Los Angeles	12,358 / 12,358 (100%)	$973,765
Madison Square Garden	New York City	9,142 / 12,896 (70%)	$1,013,711
American Airlines Arena	Miami	10,859 / 13,241 (82%)	$1,009,716
Toyota Center	Houston	4,551 / 7,098 (64%)	$354,881
Nokia Theatre at Grand Prairie	Grand Prairie	4,044 / 6,309 (66%)	$331,413
Patriot Center	Fairfax	3,836 / 7,388 (51%)	$317,724
Amway Arena	Orlando	3,759 / 5,470 (68%)	$280,382
Dodge Arena	Hidalgo	3,073 / 4,732 (64%)	$259,357
Arena at Gwinnett Center	Duluth	2,367 / 7,395 (32%)	$215,368
AT&T Center	San Antonio	2,797 / 6,797 (41%)	$208,910
Laredo Entertainment Center	Laredo	2,133 / 6,158 (34%)	$96,947
Universidad Simón Bolívar	Caracas	13,711 / 18,000 (76%)	$1,413,808
Estadio Misael Delgado	Valencia	8,858 / 20,000 (44%)	$733,815
Agganis Arena	Boston	2,907 / 4,899 (59%)	$278,203
National Auditorium	Mexico City	54,228 / 58,098 (93%)	$2,068,926
José Miguel Agrelot Coliseum	San Juan	27,441 / 27,441 (100%)	$1,511,893
Totals		246,880 / 358,369 (68%)	$15,512,503
