= 5to Piso =

Studio album by Ricardo Arjona
- Released: 18 November 2008
- Recorded: 2008; Miami, FL (Jet Wash Studios, Legacy Studio, The Tiki Room, Wally World, Picks & Hammers); Mexico City (Antigua Studios); Veracruz, Mexico (Cabanna Studios); Los Angeles (Green Parrot Studios, House of Therm); Nashville, TN (The Red Door)
- Genre: Latin pop
- Label: Warner Music
- Producers: Jorge Amaro, Ricardo Arjona, Fernando Otero, Lee Levin, Tommy Torres, Fernando de Santiago

Ricardo Arjona chronology
| Quién Dijo Ayer (2007) | 5to Piso (2008) | Simplemente Lo Mejor (2008) |

Singles from 5to Piso
- 1. "Como Duele" Released: 4 November 2008; 2. "Sin Ti... Sin Mi" Released: 19 January 2009; 3. "Ni Tú Ni Yo" Released: 27 May 2009; 4. "Tocando Fondo" Released: 25 July 2009; 5. "Suavecito" Released: 1 September 2009; 6. "Por Si Regresas" Released: 6 October 2009

5to Piso (Quinto Piso, 5th Floor) is the eleventh studio album by Guatemalan singer-songwriter Ricardo Arjona, released on 18 November 2008. Produced by Arjona, Jorge Amaro, Dan Warner, Lee Levin, Fernando de Santiago and Puerto Rican singer-songwriter Tommy Torres, the album was recorded in various studios between the United States and Mexico. It is the first release by the artist under Warner Music. Arjona commented that with this album, he "tried to recoup some of the freshness" of his past releases, stating that "it makes good to the songs". Jason Birchmeier from Allmusic named it "an eagerly awaited album with a phenomenal lead single." 5to Piso marks the third album in which the singer collaborates with Tommy Torres, after Adentro and Quién Dijo Ayer.

Commercially and critically successful, 5to Piso became Arjona's second number-one set on the Billboard Top Latin Albums. It received gold and platinum certifications from several Latin American countries, as well as a Grammy Award nomination for Best Latin Pop Album. Six singles were released from the album. "Como Duele", considered his "biggest hit in years", became a critical and commercial success, reaching number two on the Billboard Top Latin Songs chart. "Sin Ti... Sin Mi" and "Tocando Fondo", the second and fourth singles, respectively, also became commercial hits. To promote the album, the singer embarked on his second major world tour following the Adentro Tour, which he named the Quinto Piso Tour.

== Background ==
I constantly change and i would be worried if i wouldn't, [...]. I try to be a composer with the doors open for albums of different nature.

— Ricardo Arjona.

After spending the majority of his career signed to Sony, and later, Sony BMG, Arjona signed a long-term recording deal with Warner Music Latina. The deal was closed in September 2008. Iñigo Zabala, chairman of Warner Music Latin America commented that "He's an artist that fits perfectly with our company," and that they are a label which has many top-Latin pop artist signed along with Arjona. Arjona started development of 5to Piso in 2005. He stated in an interview that the inspiration behind the album was the thought of recouping some of the "freshness" of his previous releases. The singer additionally stated that he believed each additional album is the result of an evolution, as well as contradictions that he went through, which he celebrates as part of life.

== Music and lyrics ==
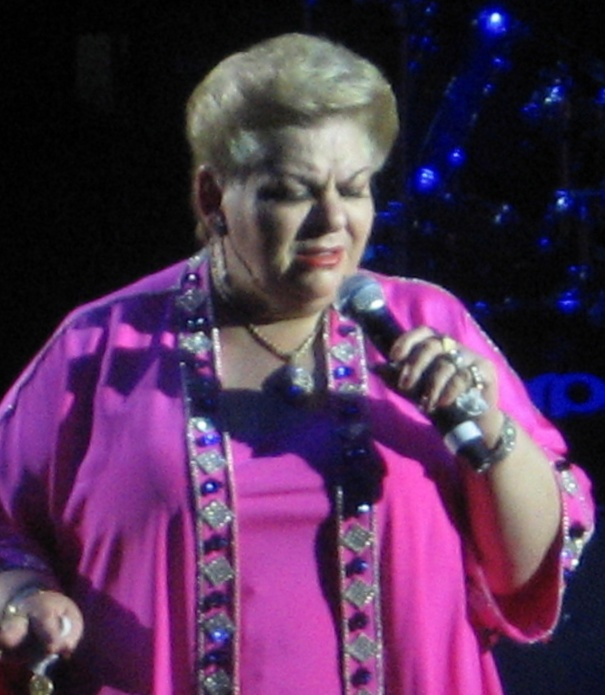
Paquita la del Barrio sang with Arjona on ranchera "Ni Tu Ni Yo".

"Quinto Piso" has been categorized as an analytic song—a prologue to the album holding autobiographical tendencies. "Sin Ti... Sin Mi" is about missing someone who has left, with analogical lyrics talking about absence of one's beloved person. "El Del Espejo" includes lyrics influenced by "self-criticism" that makes people confront themselves, crafted inside a "rhythmic sound". Lead single "Como Duele" was highly praised. Jason Birchmeier from Allmusic named it Arjona's "biggest hit in years", as well as a standout track of the album alongside "Sin Ti.. Sin Mi" and "El Del Espejo". El Mercurio Online stated that "Como Duele" is "a ballad of merciless chords and lyrics plagued of contradictions made metaphors." It was also compared to his past song "Olvidarte", from Sin Daños a Terceros.

'Que Nadie Vea'
A sample of "Que Nadie Vea", displaying the third verse sung before the chorus.

"Ni Tu Ni Yo"
A sample of "Ni Tu Ni Yo", displaying the chorus as sung by Arjona and Paquita.

In "Que Nadie Vea", the singer writes about homosexuality for the first time in his career. In the song, Arjona became the witness of this character, from his childhood until his adulthood, always hiding his true identity with the goal of being socially accepted. Arjona commented in an interview that "Que Nadie Vea" was not intended to be a "judgemental" song, further stating that it was "just a chronicle" that he wrote for this album because he never did so before and found the subject to be fascinating.

"Tocando Fondo" is about "those feelings which can make a person fall off a precipice." "La Vailarina Vecina" was inspired by a true story that happened to Arjona while he lived in Madrid. The singer commented about a woman: "She was to do her trials and 'tickled', as the song says, all my roof, and those tickles didn't let me sleep." He further commented that when he planned to meet her, he discovered that she was "very beautiful". "Vuelo" is a piano ballad themed about tenderness, poetry and romanticism.

"Nadie Sabe A Donde Va" is inspired by the bombings which occurred on 11 March 2004 in Madrid at the Atocha train station. "El Demonio En Casa" has been considered the "most witty and funny" song of the album. The lyrics of the song are about a man recounting how his woman changed his life. "La Vida Está De Luto" is inspired by the actual situation of the planet, a place where man is accustomed to taking advantage of those weaker. "Ni Tu Ni Yo" is the only duet on the album, as it features Mexican ranchera singer Paquita la del Barrio. The song was composed so that when it is heard, it "gives and immediate desire of drinking tequila" according to Arjona. In an interview with newspaper Reforma, Arjona talked about the collaboration with Barrio, stating that "it was very special, because she does not make duets with someone she does not like", agreeing that he did not duet either. "Niña Buena" is dedicated to women who cannot stay in the same place and dislike having a boring life.

== Release and promotion ==
=== Singles ===
The lead single off the album was "Como Duele", a Latin pop and ballad song with soft rock and orchestral arrangements, with the main sound being a piano. It was released on 4 November 2008, and became the first single Arjona released under his new label, Warner Music. The song was a critical and commercial hit for the singer, reaching No. 2 on the Billboard Latin Songs chart, and topping the Latin Pop Songs component chart. The music video for "Como Duele" was shot in Mexico City. It was released on 20 October and was directed by the Mexican filmmaker Ricardo Calderón. "Sin Ti... Sin Mi" was chosen as the second single of the album, and was released in January 2009. The song reached No. 4 on both the Latin Songs and Latin Pop Songs chart. Its music video was filmed at the Argentinian Boxing Federation in Buenos Aires. It was directed by Joaquín Cambre. "Ni Tú Ni Yo", featuring Mexican singer Paquita la del Barrio, was released as the third single in some regions, and failed to appear on the US and other national charts. The music video for the song was filmed in black-and-white and features both artists singing around a buffet. Pop ballad "Tocando Fondo" followed as fourth single. The song managed to reach No. 20 on the Latin Songs chart, becoming the third top ten single off 5to Piso on the Latin Pop Songs chart, reaching No. 6. Its music video was filmed in Mexico City. Two other singles, "Suavecito" and "Por Si Regresas" were released in promotion of the album.

=== Tour ===
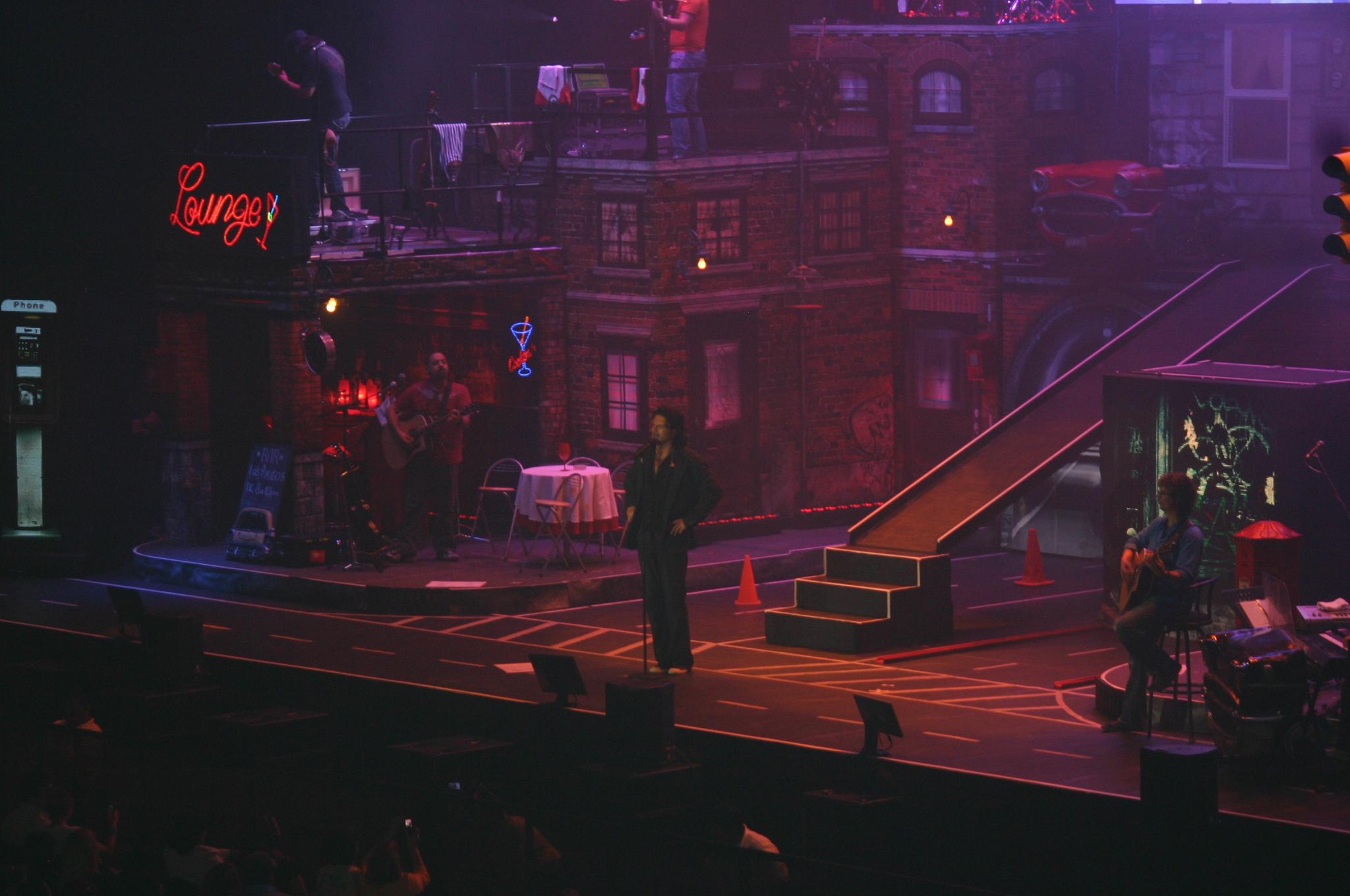
Ricardo Arjona in Laredo, Texas.

To promote the album, the singer embarked on his second major world tour, the Quinto Piso Tour. Starting on 24 April 2009, the tour included 123 shows between the United States, Spain, Argentina, Guatemala, Colombia, Venezuela, Mexico, among many other countries in Latin America. It ended on 18 June 2010. During the first North American leg of the tour, Arjona expressed interest in singing in Cuba, though showed no political commitment for the matter, a clear reference of the charity event Colombian singer Juanes was planning to hold in that country in 2009. Later that year, Arjona cancelled the planning of a concert in the country, and spoke heavily about Juanes' charity concert influence on the decision. The Quinto Piso Tour has been one of the most successful tours made by a Latin artist, with an attendance of more than one million people from 19 countries. Also, Arjona received in 2010 a Billboard Latin Music Award for "Latin Tour of the Year". The tour grossed more than $15 million.

== Reception ==
=== Critical response ===
Professional ratings
Review scores
| Source | Rating |
|---|---|
| Allmusic | 3.5/5 stars |

Jason Birchmeier from Allmusic gave a mostly positive review of the album, commenting that "fans of Arjona's straight-ahead rock style are sure to be disappointed with much of 5to Piso, as piano and strings drive much of the music rather than the electric guitar and drums of years past." Billboard's Leila Cobo, on her review of the album, commented that the singer had "an uncanny knack for marrying sophisticated lyrics with catchy hooks and mass-appeal messages", stating that songs like "Ni Tu Ni Yo", a duet with Paquita la del Barrio, "underscores how universal" his songs and themes are, "even in the most regional arrangements." 5to Piso received a Grammy Award nomination for Best Latin Pop Album and a Latin Grammy Award nomination for Best Singer-Songwriter Album though lost to Sin Frenos and Caetano Veloso respectively.

=== Commercial performance ===
5to Piso debuted atop the Billboard Top Latin Albums chart the week ending 6 December 2008, going ahead of Wisin & Yandel's La Mente Maestra. The following week, it stayed at No. 1. On its third week, it fell to No. 2, being replaced at the top by Vicente Fernández' Primera Fila. On the Latin Pop Albums component chart, the album debuted at No. 1 the same week it did on the Latin Albums chart. The album stayed at the top of that chart for four consecutive weeks. On its fifth week, it fell to No. 2, being replaced at the top by Luis Fonsi's Palabras del Silencio. Almost one year later, on the week ending 12 September 2009, 5to Piso reached No. 1, with a total of six weeks at the top. It was the most weeks at No. 1 by any of Arjona's albums until Independiente stayed 11 weeks at the top between 2011 and 2012.

On the week it debuted atop both Latin Albums and Latin Pop Albums charts, 5to Piso also appeared at No. 55 on the Billboard 200. It is his third consecutive album to chart on that list, after Adentro (2005) and Quién Dijo Ayer (2007), and it was his highest entry until Poquita Ropa reached No. 43 in 2010. On the Mexican Albums Chart, 5to Piso debuted at No. 40 the week ending 8 November 2008. The following week it jumped to No. 4, and on its third week, the album reached No. 1 position on the country. It stayed at that position for one week, falling to No. 4 again on its fourth week. It also reached No. 21 on the Spanish Albums Chart.

The album followed the success of his past releases, receiving Gold and Platinum certifications in Mexico, United States, Spain, Argentina, Venezuela, Colombia, Guatemala, and many other countries. It debuted at No. 1 on the Billboard Top Latin Albums chart, becoming his second chart-topper on that chart, and has sold more than one million copies worldwide.

== Track listing ==
All tracks are written by Ricardo Arjona.

| No. | Title | Length |
|---|---|---|
| 1. | "Quinto Piso" | 5:01 |
| 2. | "Sin Ti... Sin Mi" | 4:20 |
| 3. | "El del Espejo" | 4:16 |
| 4. | "Como Duele" | 3:30 |
| 5. | "Que Nadie Vea" | 5:44 |
| 6. | "Tocando Fondo" | 4:28 |
| 7. | "La Bailarina Vecina" | 3:47 |
| 8. | "Vuelo" | 3:42 |
| 9. | "Nadie Sabe a Donde Va" | 4:53 |
| 10. | "El Demonio en Casa" | 3:56 |
| 11. | "La Vida Está de Luto" | 4:06 |
| 12. | "Suavecito" | 4:05 |
| 13. | "Ni Tú Ni Yo (duet with Paquita la del Barrio)" | 5:40 |
| 14. | "Niña Buena" | 5:20 |

iTunes Bonus Track
| No. | Title | Length |
|---|---|---|
| 15. | "Si Dios Me Pasa Factura" | 5:04 |

European/Australian Bonus Track
| No. | Title | Length |
|---|---|---|
| 15. | "Por Si Regresas" | 3:52 |

== Personnel ==
The credits are taken from the iTunes exclusive digital booklet.

"Quinto Piso"

- Backing Vocals – Tommy Torres
- Bandoneon – Marcelo Nisinman
- Upright Bass – Brian Lang
- Drums, Percussion – Lee Levin
- Wurlitzer – Peter Wallace
- Guitar – Dan Warner
- Mixing engineer(s) – David Thoener
- Producers, Arrangements – Dan Warner, Lee Levin, Tommy Torres
- Recording engineers – Andres Saavedra, Dan Warner, Isaías García, Lee Levin, Tommy Torres

"Sin Ti... Sin Mí"

- Backing Vocals – Tommy Torres
- Bass, Guitar, Mandolin – Dan Warner
- Drums, Percussion – Lee Levin
- Keyboards – Peter Wallace*
- Mixing engineer(s) – David Thoener
- Piano – Doug Emery
- Producer, Arrangements – Dan Warner, Lee Levin, Tommy Torres
- Recording engineer(s) – Andres Saavedra, Dan Warner, Isaías García, Lee Levin, Tommy Torres

"El Del Espejo"

- Acoustic Guitar, Hammond B-3 – Carlos Cabral Jr.
- Bass – Julio Hernández
- Drums – Lee Levin
- Electric Guitar – Dan Warner
- Mixing engineer(s) – Ben Wisch
- Producer, Arrangements – Carlos Cabral Jr., Ricardo Arjona
- Recording engineer(s) – Carlos Cabral "Junior", Dan Warner, Isaías García, Julio Chávez, Lee Levin

"Cómo Duele"

- Arrangements – Chris McDonald, Dan Warner, Lee Levin, Tommy Torres
- Backing Vocals – Tommy Torres
- Bass, Guitar – Dan Warner
- Cello – Anthony LaMarchina, Carole Rabinowitz
- Drums, Percussion – Lee Levin
- Recording engineer (Assistant) – Matt Helman
- Keyboards – Peter Wallace
- Mixing engineer(s) – David Thoener
- Piano – Matt Rollings
- Producer – Dan Warner, Lee Levin, Tommy Torres
- Recording engineer(s) – Andres Saavedra, Bernard Levin, Dan Warner, Isaías García, Lee Levin, Randy Poole, Tommy Torres
- Viola – Kristin Wilkinson, Monisa Angell
- Violin – Alan Umstead, Carolyn Bailey, Cathy Umstead, Conni Ellisor, David Angell, Mary Katheryn VanOsdale, Pamela Sixfin
- Violin, Concertmaster – Carl Gorodetzky

"Que Nadie Vea"

- Acoustic Guitar, Programming – Carlos Cabral "Junior"
- Arrangements – Carlos Cabral "Junior", Ricardo Arjona
- Arrangements (Orchestra) – Fernando Otero
- Bass – Julio Hernández
- Cello – Ann Kim Rozenblatt, Wolfram Koessel
- Drums – Lee Levin Electric
- Guitar – Dan Warner
- Mixing engineer(s) – Ben Wisch
- Producer – Carlos Cabral Jr., Fernando Otero, Ricardo Arjona
- Recording engineer(s) – Carlos Cabral "Junior", Dan Warner, Isaías García, Julio Chávez, Lee Levin
- Recording engineer(s) (Strings) – Tom Swift
- Viola – Jonathan Dinklage, Katharine C. Knesek
- Violin – Elissa Cassini, Nick Danielson, Sami Merdinian, Svetlana T. Tsonero

"Tocando Fondo"

- Accordion – Jeff Taylor
- Backing Vocals – Tommy Torres
- Bass, Guitar – Dan Warner
- Brass – Russ Pohl
- Drums, Percussion – Lee Levin
- Recording engineer (Assistant) – Mikey Allred
- Keyboards – Peter Wallace
- Mixing engineer(s) – David Thoener
- Piano – Doug Emery
- Producer, Arrangements – Dan Warner, Lee Levin, Tommy Torres
- Recording engineer(s) – Andres Saavedra, Dan Rudin, Dan Warner, Isaías García, Lee Levin, Tommy Torres

"La Bailarina Vecina"

- Arrangements (Orchestra) – Fernando Otero
- Cello – Ann Kim Rozenblatt, Wolfram Koessel
- Double Bass – Eddy Kaimovich
- Flute – Cecilia Tenconi
- Mixing engineer(s) – Isaías García
- Producer – Fernando Otero, Ricardo Arjona
- Recording engineer(s) – Isaías García, Tom Swift
- Viola – Jonathan Dinklage, Katharine C. Knesek
- Violin – Elissa Cassini, Nick Danielson, Sami Merdinian, Svetlana T. Tsonero

"Vuelo"

- Acoustic Guitar – Carlos Cabral Jr.
- Cello – Rodrigo Duarte
- Drums – Lee Levin
- Electric Guitar – Dan Warner
- Mixing engineer(s) – Ben Wisch
- Piano – Matt Rollings
- Producer, Arrangements – Carlos Cabral Jr., Ricardo Arjona
- Recording engineer(s) – Carlos Cabral "Junior", Dan Warner, Isaías García, Julio Chávez, Lee Levin

"Nadie Sabe a Donde Va"

- Acoustic Guitar (12 String), Electric Guitar (12 String) – Gerardo García, Jorge Chiquis Amaro
- Backing Vocals – Roxana Puente
- Drums, Bass, Recording engineer, Mixing engineer – Jorge Chiquis Amaro
- Hammond B-3 – Iván González
- Producer – Jorge Chiquis Amaro*

"El Demonio En Casa"

- Arrangements (Orchestra) – Fernando Otero
- Cello – Ann Kim Rozenblatt, Wolfram Koessel
- Double Bass – Eddy Kaimovich
- Mixing engineer(s) – Ben Wisch
- Producer – Fernando Otero, Ricardo Arjona
- Recording engineer(s) – Tom Swift
- Soprano vocals – Gizel Xanath
- Viola – Jonathan Dinklage, Katharine C. Knesek

"Suavecito"

- Acoustic Guitar, Mandolin, Harmonica – Carlos Cabral "Junior"
- Bass – Julio Hernández
- Mixing engineer(s) – Ben Wisch
- Percussion – Armando Montiel
- Piano – Victor Patrón
- Producer, Arrangements – Carlos Cabral Jr., Ricardo Arjona
- Recording engineer(s) – Carlos Cabral "Junior", Dan Warner, Isaías García, Julio Chávez, Lee Levin
- Violin – Elissa Cassini, Nick Danielson, Sami Merdinian, Svetlana T. Tsonero

"Ni Tú Ni Yo"

- Accordion – Jair Alcala
- Arrangements – Fernando De Santiago Casanova
- Guitar – Miguel Peña
- Guitarrón mexicano – Marco Antonio De Santiago
- Harmonica – Armando De Jesús Martínez
- Mixing engineer(s) – Ben Wisch
- Producer – Fernando De Santiago, Ricardo Arjona
- Recording engineer(s) – Isaías García
- Vihuela, Guitar (Guitarra De Mariachi) – Fernando De Santiago
- Violin – Abraham Corona, Arturo Viveros, David Rivera, Hipólito Mateo, Hugo Colula
- Lead vocals – Paquita la del Barrio

"Niña Buena"

- Acoustic Guitar, Electric Guitar, Hammond B-3 – Carlos Cabral "Junior"
- Bass – Julio Hernández
- Drums – Lee Levin
- Mixing engineer(s) – Ben Wisch
- Piano – Matt Rollings
- Producer, Arrangements – Carlos Cabral Jr., Ricardo Arjona
- Recording engineer(s) – Carlos Cabral "Junior"*, Dan Warner, Isaías García, Julio Chávez, Lee Levin

== Chart performance ==
=== Weekly charts ===
| Chart (2008) | Peak position |
|---|---|
| Chilean Albums (FeriaDelDisco) | 4 |
| Mexican Albums (Top 100 Mexico) | 1 |
| Spanish Albums (Promusicae) | 21 |
| US Top Latin Albums (Billboard) | 1 |
| US Latin Pop Albums (Billboard) | 1 |
| US Billboard 200 | 55 |
| Uruguayan Albums (CUD) | 1 |
| Venezuelan Albums (Recordland) | 1 |

=== Yearly charts ===
| Chart (2008) | Peak position |
|---|---|
| Mexican Albums (Top 100 Mexico) | 17 |

| Chart (2009) | Peak position |
|---|---|
| US Top Latin Albums (Billboard) | 9 |
| US Latin Pop Albums (Billboard) | 2 |
| Mexican Albums (Top 100 Mexico) | 29 |
| Argentinian Albums (CAPIF) | 6 |

=== Sales and certifications ===
| Region | Certification | Certified units/sales |
|---|---|---|
| Argentina (CAPIF) | 3× Platinum | 120,000^{^} |
| Chile (IFPI) | Gold | 7,500^{^} |
| Colombia (ASINCOL) | Gold | 5,000^{x} |
| Ecuador (IFPI) | Platinum | 6,000^{x} |
| Mexico (AMPROFON) | Platinum+Gold | 120,000^{^} |
| Peru (IFPI) | Platinum | 6,000^{x} |
| United States (RIAA) | Platinum (Latin) | 100,000^{^} |
| Uruguay (CUD) | Gold | 2,000^{x} |
| Venezuela (APFV) | Platinum | 10,000^{x} |
Summaries
| Worldwide | — | 1,000,000 |
^{^} Shipments figures based on certification alone.

== Release history ==
| Country | Date | Format(s) | Label |
|---|---|---|---|
| United States | 18 November 2008 | CD, Digital download | Warner Music Group |
| Spain | 18 November 2008 | CD, Digital download | Warner Music Group |
| Mexico | 18 November 2008 | CD, Digital download | Warner Music Group |
| Argentina | 18 November 2008 | CD, Digital download | Warner Music Group |
| Brazil | 18 November 2008 | CD, Digital download | Warner Music Group |
| Canada | 18 November 2008 | CD, Digital download | Warner Music Group |
| Guatemala | 18 November 2008 | CD, Digital download | Warner Music Group |
| Chile | 18 November 2008 | CD, Digital download | Warner Music Group |
| Venezuela | 18 November 2008 | CD, Digital download | Warner Music Group |
| Colombia | 18 November 2008 | CD, Digital download | Warner Music Group |
| United Kingdom | 18 November 2008 | CD | Warner Music Group |

== See also ==
- List of number-one albums of 2008 (Mexico)
- List of number-one Billboard Latin Pop Albums of 2010
- List of number-one Billboard Latin Albums from the 2010s
