= 2005 in Latin music =

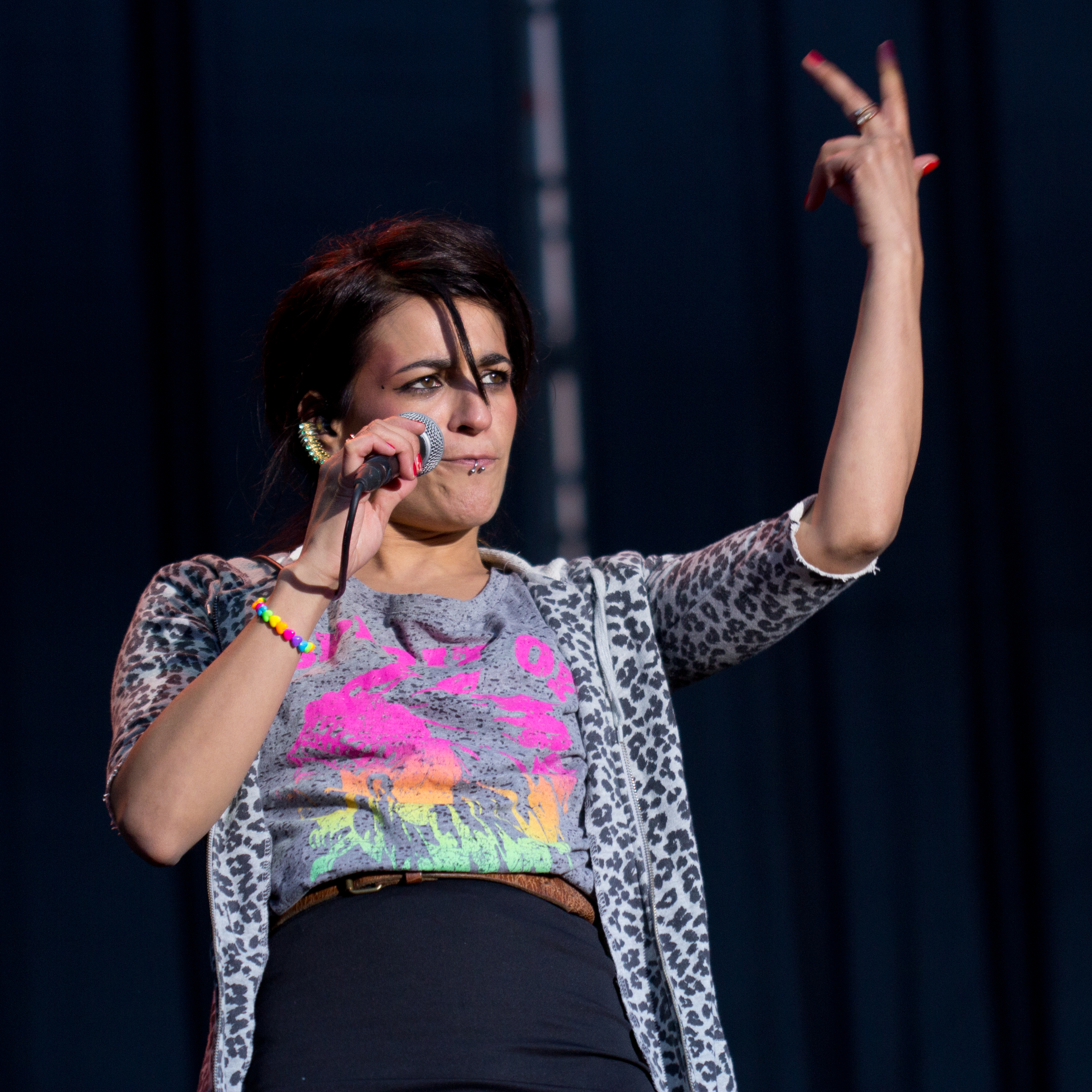
Spanish singer Bebe won the Latin Grammy Award for Best New Artist.

This is a list of notable events in Latin music (i.e. Spanish- and Portuguese-speaking music from Latin America, Europe, and the United States) that took place in 2005.

== Events ==
- May 21 – In response to the rise of Latin urban music such as reggaeton and Latin hip hop, Billboard establishes the Latin Rhythm Albums chart. Barrio Fino by Daddy Yankee is the album to reach number-one on the chart.
- August 27 – In addition to the newly created Latin Rhythm Albums chart, Billboard launches the Latin Rhythm Airplay chart for reggaeton and Latin hip hop songs. "Lo Que Pasó, Pasó" by Daddy Yankee is the first song to reach number one on the chart on the week-dated August 12, 2005.
- November 3 — The 6th Annual Latin Grammy Awards are held at the Shrine Auditorium in Los Angeles, California. It was broadcast in Spanish for the first time after the award ceremony switched from CBS to Univision.
  - Cantando Historias by Ivan Lins wins the award for Album of the Year, the first Portuguese-language album to do so.
  - Alejandro Sanz wins the award for Record of the Year and Song of the Year for "Tu No Tienes Alma".
  - Bebe wins Best New Artist.

== Number-one albums and singles by country ==
- List of number-one singles of 2005 (Spain)
- List of number-one Billboard Top Latin Albums of 2005
- List of number-one Billboard Hot Latin Songs of 2005

== Awards ==
- 2005 Premio Lo Nuestro
- 2005 Billboard Latin Music Awards
- 2005 Latin Grammy Awards
- 2005 Tejano Music Awards

== Albums released ==
=== First quarter ===
==== January ====
Day	Title	Artist	Genre(s)	Singles	Label
1	Ciudad Secreta	María Estela Monti			
4	El Zurdo De Oro	Michael Salgado	Tejano		Freddie Records
4	Partido ao Cubo	Nei Lopes	Samba		Fina Flor
4	Alto Falante	Alexandre Pires	MPB		BMG, RCA
4	Recado a São Paulo	Caju & Castanha	MPB		Trama
10	No Hay Quinto Malo	Niña Pastori	Flamenco, Vocal		Sony BMG Music Entertainment (Mexico), S.A. De C.V.
11	Rodrigo Concierto de Aranjuez/Villa Lobos: Concerto For Guitar/Ponce: Concierto Del Sur	Sharon Isbin	Modern		Warner Classics
18	MM	Marisa Monte	MPB		World Pacific Records
25	Elefante	Elefante	Ballad, Pop rock		Sony Music

==== February ====
Day	Title	Artist	Genre(s)	Singles	Label
1	Y Sigue La Mata Dando	Grupo Montéz de Durango			
1	Hoy Como Ayer	Conjunto Primavera	Corrido	"Hoy Como Ayer"	Fonovisa Records
1	En Vivo	Conjunto Atardecer			
1	Here and Now: Live in Concert	Caribbean Jazz Project featuring Dave Samuels			
1	Vive	Bobby Pulido	Tejano		Universal Music Latino
1	MTV ao Vivo	Rita Lee	Pop rock		EMI
8	Mas Flow 2	Luny Tunes and Baby Ranks	Reggaeton		Universal, Mas Flow Incorporated
8	Andrea Echeverri	Andrea Echeverri	Pop rock		Nacional Records
8	Velvetina	Miguel Bosé	Pop rock		WEA
8	Tarefero de Mis Pagos	Chango Spasiuk	Chamame		Piranha
15	Diez	Intocable	Norteño	"Aire"	EMI, Televisa EMI Music
15	En El Cielo de Tu Boca	Circo	Indie Pop, New Wave, Alternative Rock		Universal Music
15	Amanecer Contigo	Frankie Negrón	Salsa		Sony Discos
15	100% Autoridad Duranguense	La Autoridad de la Sierra			
15	Atrévete	Los Palominos			
21	Ao Vivo, Vol. 3	Jorge Aragão			
22	City Zen	Kevin Johansen + The Nada			Los Años Luz Discos
22	El Milagro de Candeal	Carlinhos Brown			

==== March ====
Day	Title	Artist	Genre(s)	Singles	Label
1	Y Segiumos con Duranguense	Los Horóscopos de Durango			
1	Desahogo	Vico C	Reggaeton		EMI Latin
1	En Vivo Desde Carnegie Hall	Víctor Manuelle	Salsa	"La Vida Es Un Carnaval"	Sony Discos
1	El Otro Lado de Mi	Soraya	Ballad		EMI Latin
1	Desde Mi Barrio	Andy & Lucas	Flamenco, Ballad		Sony Discos, BMG U.S. Latin
8	Consuelo en Domingo	Los Horóscopos de Durango			
15	Ahora le Toca al Cangri! Live	Daddy Yankee	Reggaeton		VI Music
15	En Vivo, Vol. II	Valentín Elizalde	Corrido, Norteno		Universal
15	Vol. 5: Carnival	Los Hombres Calientes	Afro-Cuban Jazz, Latin Jazz		Basin Street Records
15	Llegaron los Camperos: Concert Favorites of Nati Cano	Mariachi Los Camperos de Nati Cano			
15	El Kilo	Orishas	RnB/Swing, Afro-Cuban, Pop Rap, Conscious		Surco
15	Mi vida con ellas	Fito Páez	Pop rock		DBN
15	Pra Sempre ao Vivo no Pacaembu	Roberto Carlos	MPB, Ballad		Amigo Records, Sony Music
22	De Tango Somos	Nicolás Ledesma Cuarteto			
23	Tradición	Tropicana All Stars and Israel Kantor			
28	El Aire de tu Casa	Jesus Adrian Romero	Gospel		Vástago Producciones
29	Ni Juana La Cubana	Rigo Dominguez Y Su Grupo Audaz			
29	Directo al Corazón	Los Tigres del Norte	Norteño		FonoVisa Records
29	Y Sus Corridos Consentidos	Vicente Fernández			Sony Discos
29	Desde Siempre	Chayanne	Ballad, vocal	"Contra Vientos y Mareas"	Sony Discos
29	The Reggaetony Album	Tony Touch	Reggaeton		EMI Latin
29	Postales	Presuntos Implicados			WEA
29	Música Pa'l Pueblo	Locos Por Juana			Musical Productions

=== Second quarter ===
==== April ====
Day	Title	Artist	Genre(s)	Singles	Label
5	Divinas	Patrulla 81	Corrido, Conjunto		Disa
5	Un Metro Cuadrado	Jarabe de Palo			DRO
5	El Regalo 2	Tatiana La Reina De Los Ninos			Disa Ninos
12	God's Project	Aventura	Merengue, Reggaeton, Bachata, Rhythm & Blues	"Angelito" "La Boda" "Ella y Yo" "Un Beso"	Sony Discos
12	Un Viaje	Café Tacuba	Alternative Rock		Universal Music Latino
12	John Ghetto	Juan Gotti	Gangsta, Crunk		Dope House Records, Warner Music Latina
12	Luis Salinas y Amigos En España	Luis Salinas			Pimienta Records, Epsa Music
19	Divinas	Patrulla 81	Corrido, Conjunto		Disa
19	Una Nueva Mujer	Olga Tañón	Cumbia, Merengue	"Bandolero" "Vete, Vete"	Sony Discos
19	Más Que Grande Él	Elvis Martínez			
25	Brasilatinidade	Martinho da Vila	Samba		MZA Music, EMI
25	À Vera	Zeca Pagodinho	Samba		Mercury, Universal Music
25	O Canto da Sereia	Gil	Axe, MPB		EMI
26	Inventario	Joan Sebastian	Ranchera		Musart
26	Milagro	La Tropa F	Tejano		Freddie Records
26	Para Mi Gente	Jimmy González & El Grupo Mazz			
26	Ciclón	Ciclón			

==== May ====
Day	Title	Artist	Genre(s)	Singles	Label
1	Corazón	Fonseca		"Te Mando Flores" "Hace Falta"	EMI Televisa Music
3	Consejo	La Secta AllStar		"La Locura Automática" "Este Corazón"	Universal Music Latino
3	Edición Especial	Ismael Miranda	Salsa	"Se Fué y Me Dejó"	Sony Discos
5	MTV ao Vivo	Barão Vermelho	Blues rock, Pop rock		Wea Music
9	Ao Vivo	Tianastácia			EMI
10	Los K-Becillas	Master Joe & O.G. Black	Reggaeton		OLE Music
10	Pájaros en la cabeza	Amaral	Pop rock, Ballad		EMI Latin, EMI Latin
10	Para ti con desprecio	Panda	Alternative Rock	"Cita en el Quirófano" "Cuando No Es Como Debería Ser" "Disculpa los Malos Pensamientos"	Movic Records, Warner Music Latina
10	Selena ¡VIVE!	Various artists			
16	Tempo Caboclo	Mauro Senise and Jota Moraes			
19	Até Onde Vai	Jota Quest	Pop rock		Sony BMG Music Entertainment
24	El Rey de las Cantinas	Lupillo Rivera	Corrido, Ranchera, Norteno		Univision Records, Univision Music Group
24	Reik	Reik	Pop rock	"Yo Quisiera" "Qué Vida La Mía" "Noviembre Sin Ti" "Niña" "Levémente"	Sony Discos
24	Live at the Blue Note	Arturo Sandoval	Latin Jazz		Half Note
24	Arroz con Mango	Tiempo Libre	Salsa, Timba		Shanachie
24	Lina Luna	Lina Luna			
24	A Mi Manera	Inés Gaviria	Alternative Rock, Acoustic, Pop rock		Respek Records
24	Hay Amor	Banda el Recodode Cruz Lizarraga	Ranchera, Cumbia		Fonovisa Records, Univision Music Group
24	Rumba En La Habana Con...	Yoruba Andabo	Cubano, Rumba, Guaguanco		Pimienta Records
24	Concierto Barroco	Manuel Barrueco and Victor Pablo Pérez			
31	Primavera	Eliana			BMG Brasil, RCA
31	I Love Salsa!	N'Klabe	Salsa, Ballad	"I Love Salsa" "Amor de una Noche" "Evitaré"	Norte
31	Ya No Llores	Ramón Ayala y sus Bravos del Norte	Norteno, Ranchera		Freddie Records
31	Bebo de Cuba	Bebo de Cuba			Calle 54 Records

==== June ====
Day	Title	Artist	Genre(s)	Singles	Label
6	Aystelum	Ed Motta	Soul-Jazz, Jazz-Funk		Beleza, Trama
6	Pra Você	Margareth Menezes	Samba		EMI, EMI
7	Fijación Oral, Vol. 1	Shakira	Soft Rock, Reggaeton, Pop rock, Latin	"La Tortura" "No" "Día de Enero" "Las de la Intuición"	Epic
7	Chávez Ravine	Ry Cooder	Country Rock		Nonesuch, Perro Verde
7	...And Sammy Walked In	Sammy Figueroa and His Latin Jazz Explosion			Savant
7	Motivando A La Yal: Special Edition	Zion y Lennox	Reggaeton		White Lion
14	El Abrazo del Erizo	Mikel Erentxun	Soft Rock, Pop rock		Wea Latina, Inc.
14	Kickin' It... Juntos	Akwid and Jae-P			
14	Listen Here!	Eddie Palmieri	Contemporary Jazz, Latin Jazz		Concord Picante
20	Café de Maestros	Various artists			
20	Flores Negras Postangos En Vivo en Rosario Vol. II	Gerardo Gandini			
21	Ironía	Andy Andy	Bachata	"Que Ironía" "A Quien le Importa" "Para No Verte Más"	Wepa Music, Urban Box Office
28	Una Noche Inolvidable (An Unforgettable Night)	Afro-Latin Jazz Orchestra with Arturo O'Farrill			Palmetto Records
28	World on a String	Dave Valentin	Latin Jazz		HighNote Records, Inc

=== Third quarter ===
==== July ====
Day	Title	Artist	Genre(s)	Singles	Label
4	Siempre Compay	Compay Segundo			
5	Clásicos y Algo Más	Los Toros Band	Bachata, merengue	"Perdóname la Vida"	
12	Paso a Paso	Luis Fonsi	Latin pop	"Nada Es Para Siempre" "Estoy Perdido" "Vivo Muriendo" "Por una Mujer" "Paso a Paso"	Universal Music Latino
12	MQ	Milly Quezada	Merengue		J&N
12	Atrevete a Olvidarme	Brenda K. Starr	Salsa	"Tu Eres"	
12	Casa	Natalia y La Forquetina			
12	Tijuana Sessions Vol. 3	Nortec Collective			
19	Ardientes	Beto y sus Canarios			Disa
19	El Sexto Sentido	Thalía	Latin pop	"Amar sin ser amada" "Un alma sentenciada" "Seducción" "Olvídame"	EMI Latin
19	Los MVP	Angel & Khriz	Reggaeton	"Ven Bailalo"	Machete
19	Tour Generación RBD En Vivo	RBD	Latin pop		EMI Latin
25	4	Los Hermanos			
25	Alma Negra	Jair Rodrigues			
26	Que Tan Lejos Esta El Cielo	Salvador			
26	The Jazz Chamber Trio	Paquito D'Rivera			

==== August ====
Day	Title	Artist	Genre(s)	Singles	Label
1	Hybrid Tango	Hybrid Tango	Tango		
2	Por Muchas Razones Te Quiero	Grupo Bryndis			Disa
2	La Reina del Pasito Duranguense	Diana Reyes			
2	Y Que el Mundo Ruede	Los Rieleros del Norte			
2	La Llave de la Puerta Secreta	Rata Blanca			
8	Louca Paixão	Tânia Mara			
8	Hoje	Gal Costa	MPB		
9	Do It!	Poncho Sanchez	Latin jazz		
9	Estudando o Pagode	Tom Zé			
16	Las Dos Caras de la Moneda	Beto Terrazas	Regional Mexican		
16	Noche Amiga Mía	Los Nocheros			
16	Todo y Nada	Ricardo Montaner	Latin pop	"Cuando a Mi Lado Estas" "Nada"	EMI Latin
16	La Hora de la Verdad	Grupo Mania	Merengue	"Le Peleona" "Mere Pescao"	Universal Music Latino
23	Por Ti	Grupo Bronco	Regional Mexican		
23	Flashback	Ivy Queen	Reggaeton	"Cuéntale" "Te He Querido, Te He Llorado" "Libertad"	Univision
30	Sueño de Amor	Los Temerarios	Regional Mexican		
30	El Draft Del Reggaeton	Various artists	Reggaeton		
30	Los Aguacates de Jiquilpan	Akwid			
30	Llego la Hora	Mayito Rivera			
30	Infinito	Belén Arjona			
30	Inconsciente Colectivo	Fabiana Cantilo			
30	Sangre Nueva	Naldo	Reggaeton		Gold Star Music, Universal Music Latino

==== September ====
Day	Title	Artist	Genre(s)	Singles	Label
2	Más Capaces que Nunca	K-Paz de la Sierra	Duranguense		Disa
6	Por Favor, Perdón y Gracias	León Gieco			
6	Volver Volver	Michael Salgado			
13	Time Was – Time Is	Ray Barretto	Latin jazz		
13	Step Forward – The Next Generation	Juan de Marcos and the Afro-Cuban All Stars			
13	Corazón Libre	Mercedes Sosa			
13	Capitulo II: Brinca	DJ Kane			
20	Parrandera, Rebelde y Atrevida	Jenni Rivera	Banda	"Qué Me Vas a Dar" "De Contrabando" "No Vas a Creer"	Fonovisa
20	Tu Sombra	Pesado			
20	Dios es Bueno	Marcos Witt	Latin Christian		
20	Cien por Ciento	La Makina	Merengue	"Yo No Me Muero por Nadie"	
26	Ahora Piden Tu Cabeza	Ariel Rot			
27	Cautivo	Chayanne	Latin pop	"No Te Preocupes Por Mi" "No Sé Por Qué" "Te Echo de Menos"	Sony BMG Norte
27	Puro Cabas	Cabas			
27	Más Que Suficiente	Chichi Peralta			
27	Como un Campo de Maíz	Pablo Milanés			
27	Segundo	Maria Rita			
27	Más Capaces que Nunca	K-Paz de la Sierra	Duranguense		Disa
27	Las 3 Divas	Las 3 Divas			
27	La Moda	Yaga y Mackie	Reggaeton		Machete Music

=== Fourth quarter ===
==== October ====
Day	Title	Artist	Genre(s)	Singles	Label
4	Nuestro Amor	RBD	Latin pop	"Nuestro Amor" "Aún Hay Algo" "Tras de Mí" "Este Corazón"	EMI Latin
4	Evolución	Plena Libre			
4	A Toda Ley	Pablo Montero			
5	Dile	Lorenzo Antonio	Ballad		Musart
10	Sueña La Alhambra	Morente	Flamenco		
11	Timeless	The Katinas	Latin Christian		
11	Moacir Santos: Choros y Alegría	Mario Adnet & Zé Nogueira			
17	Odyssey: The Journey	The Royal Jesters	Tejano		
17	Imunidade Musical	Charlie Brown Jr.			
17	Uma Voz... Uma Paixão	Jane Duboc			
18	Historias de Mi Tierra	Pepe Aguilar			
18	Cuando Te Enamoras	Los Ángeles de Charly			
18	Jet – Samba	Marcos Valle			
19	Anoche	Babasónicos			
25	Carlos Chávez: Complete Chamber Music Volume 3	Jeff Von Der Schmidt			
25	México – Madrid: En Directo Y Sin Escalas	Alejandro Fernández	Latin pop, mariachi	"Que Voy a Hacer con Mi Amor"	Sony BMG Norte
25	Pasión	Palomo	Norteño		

==== November ====
Day	Title	Artist	Genre(s)	Singles	Label
1	Pa'l Mundo	Wisin & Yandel	Reggaeton	"Rakata" "Mírala Bien" "Llamé Pa' Verte (Bailando Sexy)" "Noche de sexo"	Machete
1	Así Es Nuestra Navidad	Gilberto Santa Rosa and El Gran Combo de Puerto Rico	Salsa		Sony BMG Norte
1	Acústico	La 5ª Estación	Latin pop		Sony BMG Norte
1	Adriana Partimpim – O Show	Adriana Partimpim			
1	Ay Mi Vida	Jerry Rivera	Latin pop, salsa	"Ay Mi Vida"	Sony BMG Norte
4	The Pitbulls	Alexis & Fido	Reggaeton	"Eso Ehh...!!"	Sony BMG Norte
7	Acústico MTV	O Rappa			
14	La Vida Moderna	Pastora			
15	Días Felices	Cristian Castro	Latin pop	"Amor Eterno" "Sin Tu Amor"	Universal Music Latino
15	Cosa Nostra: Hip Hop	Ivy Queen & Gran Omar	Hip hop	"No Hacen Na" "Paquetes"	Univision
15	Gracias Rigo	La Autoridad de la Sierra			
15	Amor y Delirio	Los Acosta			
15	Afro	Novalima			
17	Falando de Amor – Famílias Caymmi e Jobim Cantam Antônio Carlos Jobim	Nana Caymmi, Danilo Caymmi, Dori Caymmi, Paulo Jobim, Daniel Jobim	Bossa nova		Sony BMG Music Entertainment
21	Contratenor	Edson Cordeiro			
21	As Super Novas	Ivete Sangalo			
22	Grandes Éxitos	Luis Miguel	Latin pop	"Misterios del Amor" "Si Te Perdiera"	Warner Music Latina
22	Adios Amor	Joseph Fonseca			
22	Hoy, Mañana y Siempre	Tito Nieves	Salsa	"Esa Boquita"	Univision
22	Mañana	Sin Bandera	Latin pop	"Suelta Mi Mano" "Que Me Alcance la Vida"	
22	Picasso En Mis Ojos	Diego El Cigala	Flamenco		
25	Borrón y Cuenta Nueva	Tito Rojas	Salsa	"Si Me Faltás Tú" "Cuando un Hombre Se Enamora"	Musical Productions
29	Calle 13	Calle 13			Sony BMG Norte
29	Dos Soneros, Una Historia	Gilberto Santa Rosa and Víctor Manuelle	Salsa	"Dos Soneros, Una Historia"	Sony BMG Norte

==== December ====
Day	Title	Artist	Genre(s)	Singles	Label
5	Simone – Ao Vivo	Simone			
6	Adentro	Ricardo Arjona	Latin pop	"Acompañame A Estar Solo" "Pingüinos En La Cama" "Mojado" "A Ti" "De Vez En Mes"	Sony BMG Norte
6	Da Hitman Presents Reggaetón Latino	Don Omar	Reggaeton		Machete
6	Amor de Locos	Eddy Herrera	Merengue		
6	Rankeao	Limi-T 21	Merengue	"El Baile Pegao"	
6	Alivio de Luto	Joaquín Sabina			
6	Dos amores un amante	Ana Gabriel			
6	Live In Los Angeles	Los Pinguos			
13	La Voz de un Ángel	Yuridia	Latin pop		Sony BMG Norte
13	Barrio Fino en Directo	Daddy Yankee	Reggaeton	"Rompe" "Gangsta Zone" "Machucando" "El Truco"	El Cartel
13	Só Para Baixinhos 6	Xuxa			
19	Ao Vivo	Demônios da Garoa			
20	Antes Muertas Que Sencillas	Los Horóscopos de Durango			
20	Buddha's Family 2: Desde La Prisión	DJ Buddha	Reggaeton, Hip-hop		Buddha's Productions, Machete Music
27	Voltio	Julio Voltio	Reggaeton		Sony BMG, White Lion

=== Unknown ===
Title	Artist	Genre(s)	Singles	Label
The Power of Friends	Avizo	Tejano		
Chicanisimo	Little Joe	Tejano		
Then & Now	Joe Posada	Tejano		
Cuba le Canta a Serrat	Various artists			
Além do que os Olhos Podem Ver	Oficina G3			
Mujeres	Estrella Morente	Flamenco		
Vivo Para Ti	Daniel Calveti	Latin Christian		
Hoje	Os Paralamas do Sucesso			
Tudo Que o Tempo Me Deixou	Alaíde Costa			
Volume 8	Banda Calypso			
Productos Desaparecidos	La Pestilencia			
Solo	Gonzalo Rubalcaba	Latin jazz		
Romper el silencio	Perrozompopo	Folk rock		

== Best-selling records ==
=== Best-selling albums ===
The following is a list of the top 10 best-selling Latin albums in the United States in 2005, according to Billboard.

Rank	Album	Artist
1	Barrio Fino	Daddy Yankee
2	Fijación Oral, Vol. 1	Shakira
3	Mi Sangre	Juanes
4	Chosen Few II: El Documental	Various artists
5	Mas Flow 2	Luny Tunes and Baby Ranks
6	Y Sigue La Mata Dando	Grupo Montéz de Durango
7	México en la Piel	Luis Miguel
8	Rebelde	RBD
9	Divinas	Patrulla 81
10	X	Intocable

=== Best-performing songs ===
The following is a list of the top 10 best-performing Latin songs in the United States in 2005, according to Billboard.

Rank	Single	Artist
1	"La Tortura"	Shakira featuring Alejandro Sanz
2	"La Camisa Negra"	Juanes
3	"Hoy Como Ayer"	Conjunto Primavera
4	"Lo Que Pasó, Pasó"	Daddy Yankee
5	"Aire"	Intocable
6	"Eres Divina"	Patrulla 81
7	"Por Qué es Tan Cruel el Amor"	Ricardo Arjona
8	"Mayor Que Yo"	Luny Tunes featuring Baby Ranks, Daddy Yankee, Tony Tun Tun, Wisin & Yandel and Héctor el Father
9	"Viveme"	Laura Pausini
10	"Algo Más"	La 5ª Estación

== Deaths ==
- February 25 – Pappo, 54, Argentine guitar player
- March 27 – Rigo Tovar, 58, Mexican singer and composer.
- April 17 – Juan Pablo Torres, 58, Cuban trombonist, bandleader, arranger and producer, brain tumor
- July 30 – Pepe Jara, 76, Mexican singer
- August 6 – Ibrahim Ferrer, 78, Afro-Cuban musician, singer in the Buena Vista Social Club.
- August 24 – Kaleth Morales, 21, Colombian "New Wave" vallenato singer and songwriter.
- November 11 – Miguel Gallardo
