= Quién (Ricardo Arjona song) =

Single by Ricardo Arjona

from the album Quién Dijo Ayer
- Released: 19 June 2007
- Recorded: 2007
- Genre: Latin pop
- Length: 4:16
- Label: Sony BMG Music
- Songwriters: Ricardo Arjona; Tommy Torres
- Producers: Ricardo Arjona, Dan Warner, Lee Levin, Tommy Torres

Ricardo Arjona singles chronology
"De Vez En Mes" (2006)	"Quién" (2007)	"Quiero" (2007)

"Quién" (English: "Who") is a latin pop song by Guatemalan recording artist Ricardo Arjona, released on 19 June 2007 as the lead single from his compilation album, Quién Dijo Ayer (2007). The song's lyrics were written by Arjona, and its music was composed by Puerto Rican singer-songwriter Tommy Torres, who also worked with Arjona on his tenth studio album, Adentro (2005). Performed with additional background vocals by Torres, "Quien" was produced by Arjona with longtime collaborators Dan Warner and Lee Levin under their stage name Los Gringos, and was recorded between several studios in Miami and Mexico City.

Described by Arjona as "the world out of the window and the prison built by ourselves", "Quién" became a moderate commercial success, reaching number 21 on the US Billboard Top Latin Songs chart, and number four at the Latin Pop Songs chart. Its accompanying music video, directed by Simon Brand, was filmed in Las Vegas, and features Arjona singing while walking around the city's nighttime lights. A "jewel of elegance", according to Mexican website Terra, the music video has received 1.3 million views on YouTube.

== Background ==
In a press conference held in November 2007, Arjona stated, in relation to Quién Dijo Ayer's themes, that "yesterday is the cumulus of this that put us here, which raised us and made us what we are, for good or bad." He also said that the album was more than a compilation, and that "it's an album with all the features of the typical greatest hits disc." After spending the majority of his career signed to Sony, and later, Sony BMG, Arjona signed a long-term recording deal with Warner Music Latina in September 2008. This departure made Quien Dijo Ayer the last album the artist directly released on his former label.

== Composition ==
"Quién" is a Latin pop song with a duration of four minutes and sixteen seconds. The song's lyrics were written by Ricardo Arjona and the music was composed by Tommy Torres, who also worked with Arjona on his tenth studio album, Adentro. The song was Music producer by Lee Levin, Dan Warner and Torres with additional help from Arjona. Warner also played the electric and acoustic guitars and the bass; Levin handled the drum and percussion instruments, and Matt Rollings played the piano. "Quién" is performed by Arjona with additional background vocals from Tommy Torres. The song was recorded between five studios in Miami: The Tiki Room, Picks & Hammers, Jet Wash Studio, The Hit Factory Criteria and Hit Masters; and in Jocoteco Studios in Mexico City. "Quién" was mixed in Barking Doctor Studios in New York City by Mick Guzauski, and mastered by Vlado Meller at the Sony Music Studios on that city. Arjona commented that "'Quién' is the world out of the window and the prison built by ourselves. It's the freedom to choose the path or to prefer loneliness as an argument of nostalgia. 'Quién' is a story with the hurry of the desperate, is the flashback of those who end up loving alone."

== Promotion ==
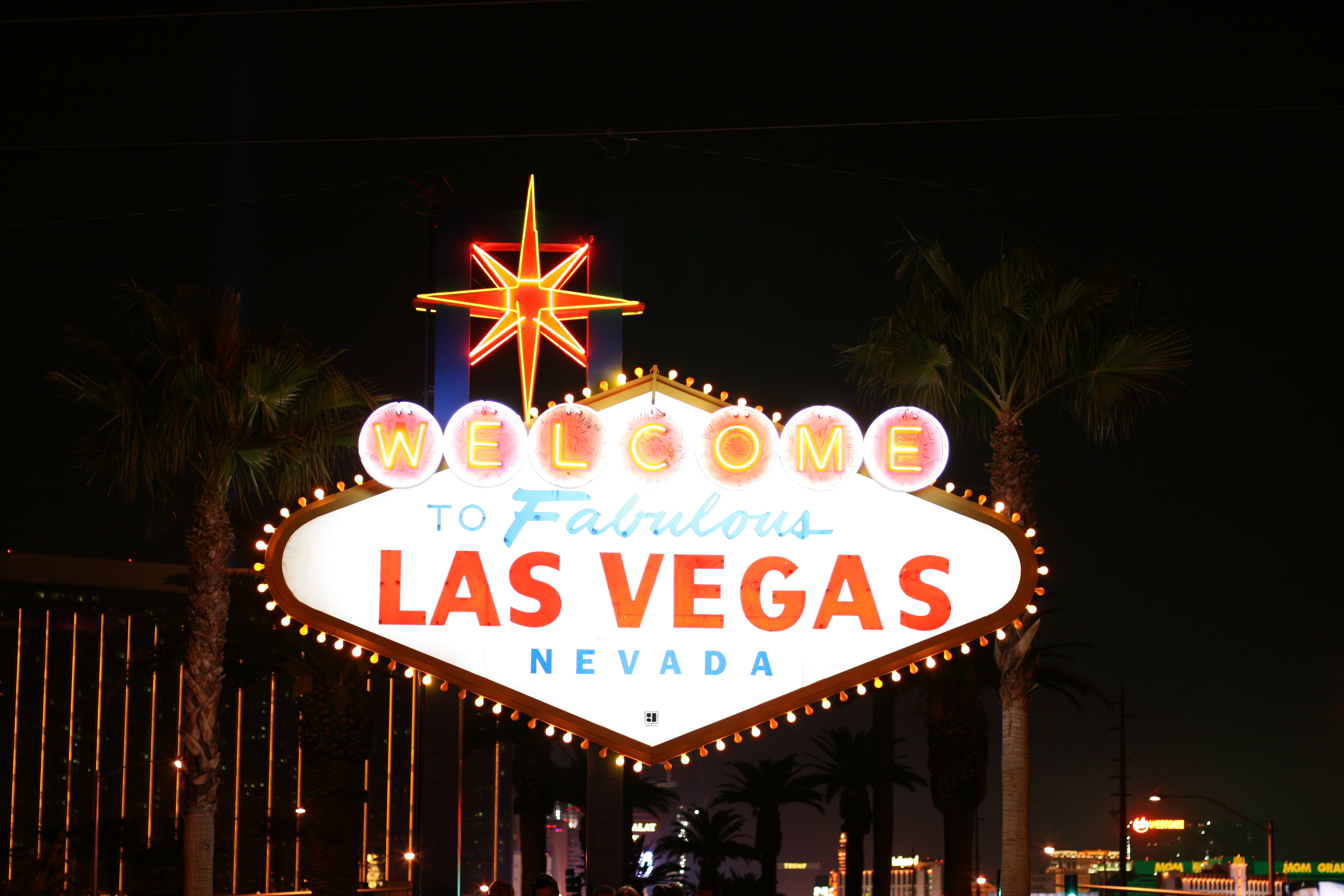
The music video for "Quién" was filmed in Las Vegas, Nevada, and directed by Simon Brand.

=== Music video ===
The music video for "Quién" was filmed in Las Vegas, Nevada. It was directed by Simon Brand, who also directed the music video for Arjona's past single "Mojado", from his album Adentro. In the video, Arjona is seen walking the streets of the city, as well as imagery of the city's buildings and lights alone, while singing the lyrics of the song. Mexican website Terra categorized the video as a "jewel of elegance and simplicity of the Guatemalan singer in all its creative glory." As of 9 December 2012, the video has reached 1.3 million views on YouTube.

== Trackslisting ==
- Digital download
1. "Quien" – 4:16

== Charts ==
=== Weekly charts ===
Chart (2007)	Peak position
US Hot Latin Songs (Billboard)	21
US Latin Pop Airplay (Billboard)	4

=== Yearly charts ===
Chart (2007)	Peak position
US Billboard Latin Pop Songs	27

== Personnel ==
Taken from the album booklet.

- Ricardo Arjona – lead vocals
- Tommy Torres – background vocals, chord arrangement, recording engineer
- Dan Warner – chord arrangement, electric guitar, acoustic guitar, bass, recording engineer
- Lee Levin – chord arrangement, drum, percussion, recording engineer
- Matt Rollings – piano
- Bob St. John – recording engineer
- Carlos Alvarez – recording engineer
- Chris Zalles – recording engineer
- Isaías G. Asbun – recording engineer
- Vlado Meller – mastering engineer
- Tom Bender – mixing assistant
- Mick Guzauski – mixing engineer

== Release history ==
Digital releases
Country	Date	Format	Label
United States	19 June 2007	Digital download	Sony Music
Mexico	19 June 2007	Digital download	Sony Music
Argentina	19 June 2007	Digital download	Sony Music
Chile	19 June 2007	Digital download	Sony Music
Venezuela	19 June 2007	Digital download	Sony Music
Costa Rica	19 June 2007	Digital download	Sony Music
Colombia	19 June 2007	Digital download	Sony Music
