= Quiero (Ricardo Arjona song) =

Single by Ricardo Arjona

from the album Quién Dijo Ayer
- Released: 2007
- Recorded: 2007
- Genre: Latin pop
- Length: 4:54
- Label: Sony BMG
- Songwriter: Ricardo Arjona
- Producers: Ricardo Arjona, Dan Warner, Lee Levin, Tommy Torres

Ricardo Arjona singles chronology
"Quién" (2007)	"Quiero" (2007)	"Como Duele" (2008)

"Quiero" (English: "I Want") is a latin pop song by Guatemalan recording artist Ricardo Arjona. It was released as the second single from his compilation album Quién Dijo Ayer (2007). Written by Arjona, the song was produced by Dan Warner, Lee Levin and Puerto Rican singer-songwriter Tommy Torres, who also worked with Arjona on Adentro. "Quiero" was recorded between several studios in Miami and Mexico City, and mixed and mastered in New York City. The song was called "bohemian" and "hippie" by website ADN Mundo, stating that it was "a love story that doesn't speak about love".

"Quiero" became a moderate commercial success, reaching number 12 on the US Billboard Top Latin Songs chart, and number eight at the Latin Pop Songs chart. It also managed to appear at number 11 on the Latin Tropical Airplay chart, and received an American Society of Composers, Authors and Publishers for Pop/Ballad Song of the year in 2009. Its accompanying music video, directed by Ricardo Calderón and featuring Dominican model and former Miss Dominican Republic Massiel Taveras, was filmed in the Dominican Republic and premiered in November 2007.

== Background ==
In a press conference, Arjona stated that "yesterday is the cumulus of this that put us here, which raised us and made us what we are, for good or bad." He also said that Quién Dijo Ayer was more than a compilation, and that "it's an album with all the features of the typical greatest hits disc." He further stated that, at first, it was "an album that began as an experiment, with a dose of informality" but later became "very complicated" thanks to the work done by the producers. After spending the majority of his career signed to Sony, and later, Sony BMG, Arjona signed a long-term recording deal with Warner Music Latina in September 2008. This departure made Quien Dijo Ayer the last album the artist directly released on his former label, although Sony later released another album named Simplemente Lo Mejor. (Note: Later in 2008, Sony released a greatest-hits compilation named Simplemente Lo Mejor, but Arjona had already released 5to Piso on Warner Music.)

== Composition ==
"Quiero" is a latin pop song written and performed by Arjona. It was produced by Tommy Torres, Dan Warner and Lee Levin. The song was recorded between five studios in Miami: The Tiki Room, Picks & Hammers, Jet Wash Studio, The Hit Factory Criteria and Hit Masters; and on Jocoteco Studios in Mexico City. "Quién" was mixed in Barking Doctor Studios in New York City by Mick Guzauski, and mastered by Vlado Meller at the Sony Music Studios on that city. Website ADN Mundo called the song "bohemian" and "hippie", saying it was "a love story that doesn't speak about love, but instead about the recent events on the world we live and finally comes to the search of an individual who challenges nostalgia finding entertainment on the impossible." In 2009, "Quiero" was awarded, along with other selected songs, the Pop/Ballad Songs of the year award by the American Society of Composers, Authors and Publishers.

== Music video ==
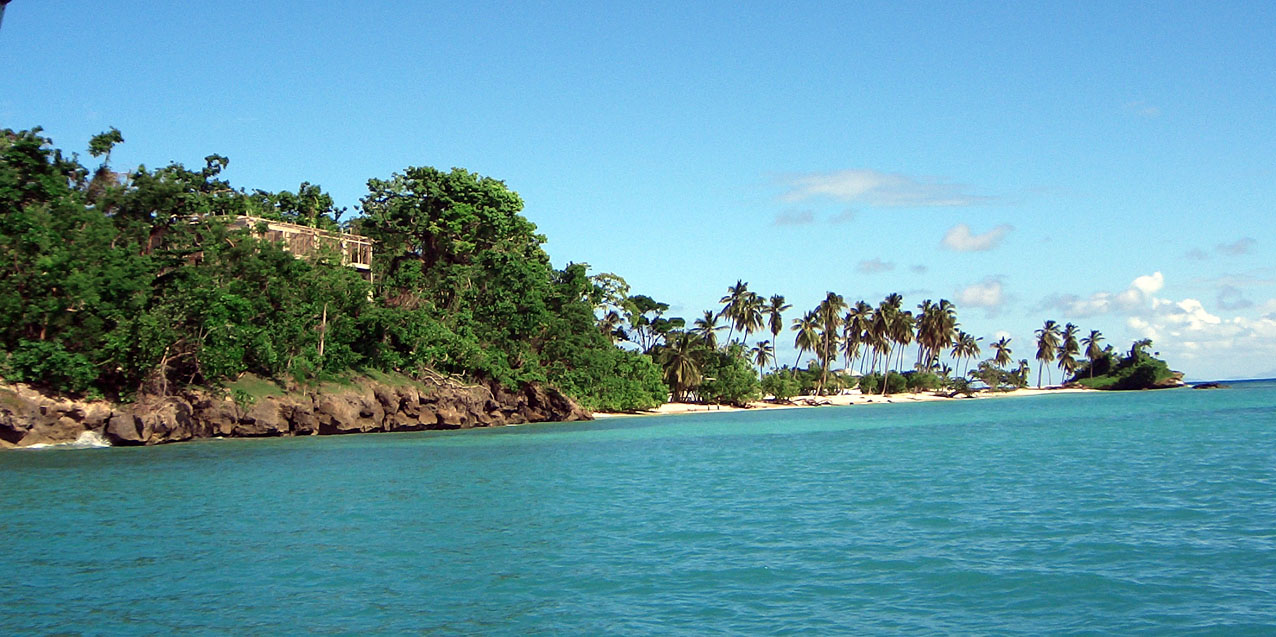
The music video for "Quiero" was filmed in Samaná Bay, a beach in the Dominican Republic.

The music video for "Quiero" was filmed in the Dominican Republic. It premiered in November 2007. Directed by Mexican filmmaker Ricardo Calderón, it was protagonized by Dominican model and former Miss Dominican Republic titleholder Massiel Taveras. During the shooting of the video, Arjona commented that the Dominican Republic was "an incredible country, filled with very helpful and wonderful people." He also stated that he felt compromise of promoting the island. The clip, filmed in black-and-white, shows Arjona singing and playing the piano close to the beach edge. Arjona's scenes are interpolated with aerial takes of the beach, as well as scenes of Taveras before several people start submerging into the water. Then, Arjona submerges himself, and the video ends.

== Charts ==
Chart (2008)	Peak position
US Hot Latin Songs (Billboard)	12
US Latin Pop Airplay (Billboard)	8
US Tropical Airplay (Billboard)	11

== Personnel ==
Taken from the album's booklet.

- Ricardo Arjona – lead vocals
- Tommy Torres – background vocals, chord arrangement, recording engineer
- Dan Warner — chord arrangement, electric guitar, acoustic guitar, bass, recording engineer
- Lee Levin — chord arrangement, drum, percussion, recording engineer
- Matt Rollings — acoustic piano
- Pete Wallace – Hammond B-3, addicional keyboards
- Bob St. John — recording engineer
- Carlos Alvarez — recording engineer
- Chris Zalles — recording engineer
- Isaías G. Asbun — recording engineer
- Vlado Meller — mastering engineer
- Tom Bender — mixing assistant
- Mick Guzauski — mixing engineer
