= Mojado =

Mojado may refer to:

- "Mojado" (song), a song by Ricardo Arjona
- Wetback (slur), an English-language slur used predominantly against Mexican-Americans
