= A Ti =

Single by Ricardo Arjona

from the album Adentro
- Released: March 2006
- Recorded: 2005
- Genre: Latin pop
- Length: 4:43
- Label: Sony BMG Music
- Songwriter: Ricardo Arjona
- Producers: Ricardo Arjona, Carlos Cabral "Junior"

Ricardo Arjona singles chronology
"Mojado" (2006)	"A Ti" (2006)	"De Vez En Mes" (2007)

"A Ti" is a song written by the Guatemalan singer-songwriter Ricardo Arjona for his tenth studio album, Adentro (2005). It was the fourth single released from the album in 2006 and was later included on Arjona's compilation album, Quién Dijo Ayer (2007), alongside a reworked version with the Italian singer Eros Ramazzotti.

== Trackslisting ==
- Album version
1. "A Ti" — 4:50

== Credits and personnel ==
- Producer - Carlos Cabral "Junior", Dan Warner
- Lead vocals - Ricardo Arjona
- Songwriting - Ricardo Arjona

== Charts ==
=== Weekly charts ===
Chart (2006)	Peak position
US Hot Latin Songs (Billboard)	14
US Latin Pop Airplay (Billboard)	3

=== Year-end charts ===
Chart (2006)	Position
US Hot Latin Songs (Billboard)	33
