= Quién Dijo Ayer =

Compilation album by Ricardo Arjona
- Released: August 21, 2007
- Recorded: 2006–07; Miami, FL (Kirkos Beats, Hit Masters, Jet Wash, Pick & Hammers, The Tiki Room, The Hit Factory Criteria); Mexico City (Jocoteco Studios, La Chicken Station, Pyramid Sound Studio); New York City (Sony Music Studios, Barking Doctor Studios, Legacy Recording, Legacy Studios); Madrid (Studio Red-Led); Milan, Italy (Medanstudios); Los Angeles, CA (Conway Studios); San Diego, CA (Cabana Studios); Buenos Aires (Super Charango)
- Genres: Pop, reggae, tango, salsa
- Label: Sony Music

Ricardo Arjona chronology
Adentro (2005)	Quién Dijo Ayer (2007)	5to Piso (2008)

Alternate cover

Singles from Quién Dijo Ayer
- 1. "Quién" Released: 19 June 2007; 2. "Quiero" Released: 11 November 2007

Quién Dijo Ayer (English: Who Said Yesterday) is a compilation album released by Guatemalan singer-songwriter Ricardo Arjona on 21 August 2007. Dan Warner and Lee Levin co-produced the album with Arjona and Puerto Rican singer-songwriter Tommy Torres. It was recorded in the United States, Mexico, Italy and Argentina, and is the last album Arjona released under the Sony Music Entertainment label before signing with Warner Music Group. It is Arjona's first compilation to include new material in the form of re-recorded versions of past hits in different musical genres from the original recordings, featuring guest artists such as Marc Anthony, Marta Sánchez and Mexican ska band Panteón Rococó, among others.

Critically and commercially successful, Quién Dijo Ayer topped the US Billboard Latin Pop Albums chart and reached number two on the Top Latin Albums chart. The album became a hit in Latin America, topping the Mexican albums chart and receiving gold and Platinum certifications in several countries including the United States. The album spawned two commercially successful singles, "Quién", which reached number four on the Billboard Latin Pop Songs chart, and "Quiero", which reached number eight. Quién Dijo Ayer received in 2008 a nomination for the Latin Grammy Award for Best Male Pop Vocal Album and the Best Male Pop Vocal Album award at the Billboard Latin Music Awards.

== Background ==
In a press conference, Arjona stated that "yesterday is the cumulus of this that put us here, which raised us and made us what we are, for good or bad." He also said that Quién Dijo Ayer was more than a compilation, and that "it's an album with all the features of the typical greatest hits disc. Several songs are the most popular, but others are the most important on other topics. We've dressed them different. "Se Nos Muere El Amor" is now with piano and flauta, as an example." He further stated that it was "an album that begun as an experiment, with a dose of informality, and suddenly, when I realized of what the producers were achieving with the songs I worked many years ago, the album finished as being very complicated."

After spending the majority of his career signed to Sony, and later, Sony BMG, Arjona signed a long-term recording deal with Warner Music Latina in September 2008. Iñigo Zabala, chairman of Warner Music Latin America commented that "He's an artist that fits perfectly with our company," and that "We are a label that has a major catalog of songwriters and quality pop and rock from the likes of Maná, Alejandro Sanz, Laura Pausini, and now, Arjona." This departure made Quien Dijo Ayer the last album the artist directly released on his former label, although Sony later released another album named Simplemente Lo Mejor.

== Composition ==
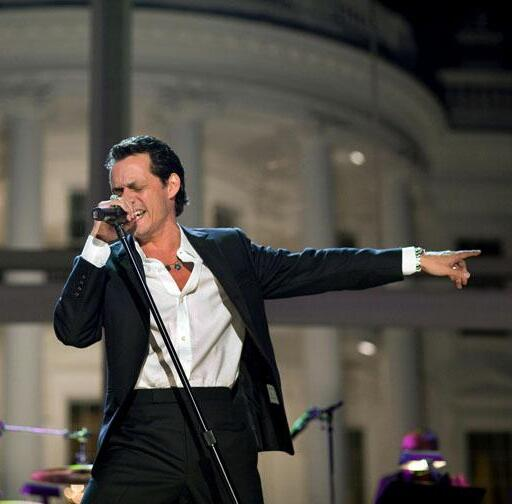
Marc Anthony sang along Arjona on the salsa version of "Historia de Taxi".

For this compilation album, Arjona re-recorded some of his older songs in a different style from the original versions, and remastered others. "Si El Norte Fuera El Sur" was transformed into a ska-style song, which he performed with Panteón Rococó. Argentinian jazz musician Fernando Otero was featured on the new version of "Jesús, Verbo No Sustantivo". "Historia De Taxi" was transformed into a salsa song, which Arjona performed with American singer Marc Anthony and pianist Sergio George; George said, "It's been interesting to work with two figures from different music worlds on the interest of making good music.", and that "every time a reunion of this kind happens, it [is] a reason to celebrate."

Arjona also re-recorded "Realmente No Estoy Tan Solo"with singer Sandro; it was last song recorded by Sandro, who died on 4 January 2010. Arjona's manager told Argentinian newspaper Clarín that "[the singer] had the idea of inviting Roberto [Sandro] for his album, he [Sandro] showed enthusiasm and manifested the same degree of appreciation to Arjona. It seemed to him that he [Arjona] was an artist who proclaims the same values he proclaimed."

This album included three new songs. "Quién" was written by Arjona, who co-produced it with Tommy Torres. It was released as the lead single from the album on 19 June 2007. Arjona commented that "'Quién' is the world out of the window and the prison built by ourselves. It's the freedom to choose the path or to prefer loneliness as an argument of nostalgia. 'Quién' is a story with the hurry of the desperate, is the flashback of those who end up loving alone." "Quiero", also written by Arjona, was released as the second single in November 2007. Website ADN Mundo called the song bohemian and hippie, and that it was "a love story that doesn't speak about love, but instead about the recent events on the world we live [in] and finally comes to the search of an individual who challenges nostalgia finding entertainment on the impossible." In 2009, "Quiero" was awarded the Pop/Ballad Songs of the Year award by the American Society of Composers, Authors and Publishers. The third new song on the album was "Espantapájaros", which was written by Arjona and Miguel Luna.

== Release and promotion ==
Quién Dijo Ayer was released in most markets as a two-disc compilation album. The first disc contains sixteen songs, of which thirteen are new versions of Arjona's past hits. On this disc appears the duets with Panteón Rococó on "Si El Norte Fuera El Sur"; Marc Anthony on "Historia de Taxi"; Marta Sanchez on "Tarde (Sin Daños A Terceros)"; Eros Ramazzoti on "A Ti" and Sandro de América on "Realmente No Estoy Tan Solo". This disc also contains the new songs "Quién", "Quiero" and "Espantapájaros". The second disc contains the same songs as the first disc but in their original versions, remastered. In Canada, Germany, Brazil and Mexico, a digital special edition was released that features only six songs on the second digital disc instead of 13. The songs included on the second disc on this version were "Se Nos Muere El Amor", "Dime Que No", "Si El Norte Fuera El Sur", "A Ti", "Tu Reputación" and "Cuando". This Brazilian version featured a different cover art. The album was also released as a single disc version with only the new versions and songs. Also, in Mexico, two physical single-disc versions of the album were released. The first includes the first single from Quinto Piso, "Como Duele" as a bonus track. This version was also released in Spain. The second version does not include "Espantapájaros" or "Realmente No Estoy Tan Solo"; it also includes "Como Duele" as a bonus track.

=== Singles ===
The first single released from the album was "Quién", a Latin pop song written by Arjona and produced by Tommy Torres and Los Gringos. The song charted on the Billboard Latin Songs at number twenty-one, and reached its peak the week ending 25 August 2007. The song was more successful on the Latin Pop Songs chart, where it reached number four. The music video for "Quién" was filmed in Las Vegas, Nevada. The second single released was "Quiero", which reached number twelve on the Billboard Latin Songs chart, and number eight on the Latin Pop Songs component chart. "Quiero" was very popular in Central American countries like Honduras, Nicaragua and Panamá. The music video for "Quiero" was filmed in the Dominican Republic and premiered in November 2007.

== Reception ==
Professional ratings
Review scores
Source	Rating
Allmusic	4/5 stars

Jason Birchmeier from Allmusic gave a positive review of the album, and commented that, "while only a couple of the new versions depart stylistically from the originals, the contemporary productions breathe new life into these songs, which should be well known by longtime fans." Quién Dijo Ayer was Arjona's second album after Galería Caribe to reach number one on the Latin Pop Albums chart; it reached its peak in the week ending 8 September 2007. On the Latin Albums chart, Quién Dijo Ayer debuted at number two. The album was commercially successful in Latin America, and was certified Gold in Venezuela, Uruguay, Colombia, Chile, and Peru; and Platinum in Argentina, Mexico and the United States.

== Track listing ==
=== Digital edition ===
All tracks are written by Ricardo Arjona.

No.	Title	Length
1.	"Se Nos Muere El Amor"	5:21
2.	"Quién"	4:16
3.	"Dime Que No"	4:23
4.	"Quiero"	4:52
5.	"Si El Norte Fuera El Sur" (feat. Panteón Rococó)	4:31
6.	"Te Conozco"	4:29
7.	"Espantapájaros"	4:00
8.	"Historia de Taxi" (feat. Marc Anthony)	6:01
9.	"La Novia Que Nunca Tuve" (feat. Pablo Milanes)	3:05
10.	"Tarde (Sin Daños a Terceros)" (feat. Marta Sánchez)	4:15
11.	"Mujeres"	4:38
12.	"A Ti" (feat. Eros Ramazzotti)	4:47
13.	"Tu Reputación" (reggae version)	4:18
14.	"Señora De Las Cuatro Décadas"	4:23
15.	"Jesús, Verbo No Sustantivo"	6:54
16.	"Cuándo"	4:44
17.	"Realmente No Estoy Tan Solo" (feat. Sandro)	4:16

iTunes Store bonus track
No.	Title	Length
18.	"Animal Nocturno"	3:39

=== Standard edition ===
The standard physical release of the album contains 2 discs with the following track list.

Disc 1: Quién Dijo...
No.	Title	Length
1.	"Se Nos Muere El Amor"	5:21
2.	"Quién"	4:16
3.	"Dime Que No"	4:23
4.	"Quiero"	4:52
5.	"Si El Norte Fuera El Sur" (feat. Panteón Rococó)	4:31
6.	"Te Conozco"	4:29
7.	"Espantapájaros"	4:00
8.	"Historia de Taxi" (feat. Marc Anthony)	6:01
9.	"Tarde (Sin Daños a Terceros)" (feat. Marta Sánchez)	4:15
10.	"Mujeres"	4:38
11.	"A Ti" (feat. Eros Ramazzotti)	4:47
12.	"Tu Reputación" (reggae version)	4:18
13.	"Señora De Las Cuatro Décadas"	4:23
14.	"Jesús, Verbo No Sustantivo"	6:54
15.	"Cuándo"	4:44
16.	"Realmente No Estoy Tan Solo" (feat. Sandro)	4:16

Disc 2: ...Ayer
No.	Title	Length
1.	"Se Nos Muere El Amor"	4:06
2.	"Dime Que No"	4:24
3.	"Si El Norte Fuera El Sur"	4:54
4.	"Te Conozco"	4:08
5.	"Historia de Taxi"	6:42
6.	"Tarde (Sin Daños a Terceros)"	4:16
7.	"Mujeres"	3:27
8.	"A Ti"	4:48
9.	"Tu Reputación"	4:47
10.	"Señora De Las Cuatro Décadas"	5:04
11.	"Jesús, Verbo No Sustantivo"	6:47
12.	"Cuándo" (pop version)	4:19
13.	"Realmente No Estoy Tan Solo"	3:51

=== Special edition ===
The special edition does not include "La Novia Que Nunca Tuve", which is at No.9 on the digital edition.

Special edition
No.	Title	Length
1.	"Se Nos Muere El Amor"	5:21
2.	"Quién"	4:16
3.	"Dime Que No"	4:23
4.	"Quiero"	4:52
5.	"Si El Norte Fuera El Sur" (feat. Panteón Rococó)	4:31
6.	"Te Conozco"	4:29
7.	"Espantapájaros"	4:00
8.	"Historia de Taxi" (feat. Marc Anthony)	6:01
9.	"Tarde (Sin Daños a Terceros)" (feat. Marta Sánchez)	4:15
10.	"Mujeres"	4:38
11.	"A Ti" (feat. Eros Ramazzotti)	4:47
12.	"Tu Reputación" (reggae version)	4:18
13.	"Señora De Las Cuatro Décadas"	4:23
14.	"Jesús, Verbo No Sustantivo"	6:54
15.	"Cuándo"	4:44
16.	"Realmente No Estoy Tan Solo" (feat. Sandro)	4:16

== Personnel ==
- Pedro Alfonso – engineer, string quartet, violin
- Carlos Alvares – engineer
- Ricardo Arjona – lead vocalist, arranger, producer
- Isaias G. Asbun – Engineer, mixing
- Pablo Aslan – double bass
- Paco Barajas – trombone
- Alberto Barros – trombone
- Tom Bender – assistant
- Robbie Buchanan – piano
- Felipe Bustamante – keyboards
- Miguel Bustamante – production assistant
- Ricardo Calderon – graphic design, photography
- Rodrigo Cardenas – bajo sexto
- Aaron Cruz – double bass
- Sal Cuevas – bajo sexto
- Hector del Curto – bandoneon
- Octavio DeMoraes – bajo sexto, choir arrangement
- Rodrigo Duarte – chelo
- Doug Emery – choir arrangement, keyboards, piano
- Dario Espinosa – bajo sexto
- Benny Faccone – engineer
- John Falcone – bajo sexto
- Ernesto Franco – photo assistance
- Isaias García – engineer
- Sergio George – arranger, keyboards, piano, producer
- Chris Glandsdorp – chelo
- Jose Gomez – programming
- Mick Guzauski – mixing
- Julio Hernandez – bajo sexto
- Rob Herrera – production assistant
- Michael Landau – electric guitar
- Lee Levin – arranger, battery, choir arrangement, engineer, percussion, producer, programming
- Erick Lopez – chorus
- Vlado Meller – mastering
- Armando Montiel – percussion
- Alfredo Oliva – concert comedian
- Fernando Otero – arranger, guest appearance, piano, producer
- Joaquin Pizarro – engineer
- Eros Ramazzotti – chorus, electric guitar
- Tony Rijos – engineer, electric guitar, guitar, producer
- Lorena Rios – coordination
- Matt Rollings – piano
- Bob St. John – engineer
- Marta Sánchez – chorus
- Milton Sesenton – piano, producer
- Tom Swift – engineer
- Tommy Torres – choir arrangement, chorus, engineer, producer, vocal producer
- Dante Vargas – trumpet
- Robert Vilera – bongos, percussion, timbales
- Pete Wallace – keyboards, hammond organ
- Ben Wish – engineer, mixing
- Christian Zalles – engineer

== Chart performance ==
=== Weekly charts ===
Chart (2007)	Peak position
Mexican Albums (Top 100 Mexico)	1
US Top Latin Albums (Billboard)	2
US Latin Pop Albums (Billboard)	1
US Billboard 200	59

=== Yearly charts ===
Chart (2007)	Peak position
US Top Latin Albums (Billboard)	71
Mexican Album Charts	9
Argentinian Album Charts	4

=== Certifications ===
Region	Certification	Certified units/sales
Argentina (CAPIF)	2× Platinum	80,000^{^}
Mexico (AMPROFON)	Platinum	100,000^{^}
United States (RIAA)	2× Platinum (Latin)	200,000^{^}
Summaries
Central America (CFC)	2× Platinum	20,000
^{^} Shipments figures based on certification alone.

== Release history ==
Country	Date	Format(s)	Label	Edition(s)
Canada	17 August 2007	Digital download	Sony Music Entertainment	Special 2-disc version
Germany	17 August 2007	Digital download	Sony Music Entertainment	Special 2-disc version
Mexico	17 August 2007	Digital download	Sony Music Entertainment	Special 2-disc version
Mexico	21 August 2007	Digital download	Sony Music Entertainment	Standard edition
Spain	21 August 2007	Digital download	Sony Music Entertainment	Special edition
United States	21 August 2007	Digital download	Sony Music Entertainment	Standard 2-disc version
Argentina	21 August 2007	Digital download	Sony Music Entertainment	Standard edition
Brazil	21 August 2007	Digital download	Sony Music Entertainment	Special 2-disc version
United States	21 August 2007	CD	Sony Music Entertainment	Standard edition
Canada	16 October 2007	CD	Sony Music Entertainment	Standard edition
United States	18 March 2008	CD	Sony Music Entertainment	Special edition
Canada	18 March 2008	CD	Sony Music Entertainment	Special edition

== See also ==
- Top 100 Mexico
- List of number-one Billboard Latin Pop Albums of 2010
