= Fundación Adentro =

Guatemalan organization

The Fundación Adentro (English: Inside Foundation) is an organization founded by Guatemalan singer-songwriter Ricardo Arjona to help provide music and singing education to poor children in Guatemala. Arjona commented that the main objective of the organization "isn't becoming an important foundation internationally, but to help child reach their dreams." The organization begun in 2005, prior to the release of Arjona's tenth studio album, Adentro, from which the foundation receives its name. It was officially launched in July 2008, and its headquarters was originally located in Mexico City, but is now in Guatemala City.
