= Acompañame A Estar Solo =

2005 single by Ricardo Arjona

Single by Ricardo Arjona

from the album Adentro
- Released: October 25, 2005
- Recorded: 2005
- Genre: Latin pop
- Length: 4:31
- Label: Sony BMG
- Songwriter: Ricardo Arjona
- Producers: Ricardo Arjona, Dan Warner, Lee Levin, Tommy Torres

Ricardo Arjona singles chronology
"Duele Verte" (2003)	"Acompañame A Estar Solo" (2005)	"Pingüinos En La Cama" (2006)

"Acompañame A Estar Solo" is a song written by Guatemalan singer-songwriter Ricardo Arjona for his tenth studio album, Adentro (2005). It was produced by Arjona, Dan Warner, Lee Levin and Tommy Torres and performed by Arjona. The song was one of the two demos Arjona sent to Torres the "hookiest and darkest tracks" he had before working with him on the production of Adentro, the other being "Iluso". Torres heavily worked on them, finally grabbing the attention of Arjona.

"Acompañame A Estar Solo" was released as the album's lead single on October 25, 2005, and became Arjona's sixth top ten hit on the Billboard Latin Songs chart, reaching No.7. It became his first lead single not to reach No.1 position on that chart, after "Desnuda", "Cuándo" and "El Problema". The song was nominated for Record of the Year and Song of the Year at the 7th Annual Latin Grammy Awards in 2006, losing on both categories to Shakira and Alejandro Sanz's song "La Tortura".

== Background and composition ==
Adentro was the first time Ricardo Arjona collaborated with Tommy Torres. Arjona commented that it was "a very representative and tremendously complete album," adding that "having different producers made it rich in possibilities." Arjona proved new sounds in Adentro. Evan Gutierrez from AllMusic considered the instrumentation, performance, and overall sonic palette to be "minimalist" and "unassuming". "Acompañame A Estar Solo" is a latin pop song written by Ricardo Arjona and produced by Arjona, Dan Warner, Lee Levin and Puerto Rican singer-songwriter Tommy Torres, who also arranged the song. On an interview, the singer commented that he first "tested" Torres by sending him the "hookiest and darkest tracks" on the album, "Acompañame A Estar Solo" and "Iluso". Torres said that he "went all out on the first demo, hiring a full band that included a string orchestra", which grabbed the attention of Arjona.

== Reception ==
"Acompañame A Estar Solo" became Arjona's sixth top ten hit on the Billboard Latin Songs chart, reaching No.7. It became his first lead single not to reach No.1 position on that chart, after "Desnuda", "Cuándo" and "El Problema" doing so. On the Latin Pop Songs chart, the song reached No.1 on the week ending January 7, 2006, and stayed at that position for three consecutive weeks. The song was nominated for Record of the Year and Song of the Year at the 7th Annual Latin Grammy Awards in 2006, losing on both categories to Shakira and Alejandro Sanz's song "La Tortura".

== Music video ==
The music video for "Acompáñame A Estar Solo" was filmed on Mexico City in two days. The video was released in a black-and-white fashion, and its protagonized by Arjona. In it, "the singer is appreciated in a moment of personal introspection, doing daily activities accompanied by his guard angel, a sweet woman." The video starts with a panoramic view of Mexico City. Following, the singer is shown in the middle of an empty street singing the lyrics of the song as well as performing the music on a black piano. Then, rainy scenes of Arjona walking through a dark street, and then going inside a house are shown. Arjona lies on a bed, besides a white-dressed woman. The video progresses as Arjona is shown in several other scenes, accompanied in all of them by the aforementioned woman, who acts as his guard. The clip ends with the singer sitting in the piano, with the woman lying on his back.

== Trackslisting ==
- Digital Download
1. "Acompañame A Estar Solo" – 4:31

== Charts ==
=== Weekly charts ===
Chart (2005–06)	Peak position
US Hot Latin Songs (Billboard)	7
US Latin Pop Airplay (Billboard)	1

=== Yearly charts ===
Chart (2006)	Peak position
US Billboard Latin Pop Songs	16

== Release history ==
Digital releases
Country	Date	Format	Label
United States	October 25, 2005	Digital download	Sony BMG Music Latin
Canada	October 25, 2005	Digital download	Sony BMG Music Latin
Mexico	October 25, 2005	Digital download	Sony BMG Music Latin
