= Pingüinos En La Cama =

Single by Ricardo Arjona

from the album Adentro
- Released: January 2006
- Recorded: 2005
- Genre: Latin pop
- Length: 3:48
- Label: Sony BMG Music
- Songwriter: Ricardo Arjona
- Producers: Ricardo Arjona, Dan Warner, Lee Levin, Tommy Torres

Ricardo Arjona singles chronology
"Acompañame A Estar Solo" (2005)	"Pingüinos En La Cama" (2006)	"Mojado" (2006)

"Pingüinos En La Cama" is a latin pop and ballad song written by Guatemalan latin pop singer-songwriter Ricardo Arjona for his tenth studio album, Adentro (2005). It was produced by Arjona, Dan Warner, Lee Levin and Tommy Torres and performed by Arjona.

The album includeas an additional version of the song, labeled "Piano & Strings version". A remix version featuring Spanish singer Chenoa was also produced. The remix was released as the second single from the album in January 2006. Both versions charted together on Billboard charts.

== Music video ==
The music video for "Pingüinos En La Cama" was recorded in Buenos Aires, Argentina, in 2006. Argentinian model Emilia Attias appears on the video. The music video relates the story of a couple throughout their time together. Nahuel Lerena directed the film, shot in two studios with six decorations, and several weather effects.

== Trackslisting ==
Digital Download – Solo Version
No.	Title	Writer(s)	Length
1.	"Pingüinos En La Cama" (Solo Version)	Ricardo Arjona	3:48

Piano & Strings version
No.	Title	Writer(s)	Length
1.	"Pingüinos En La Cama" (Piano & Strings version)	Ricardo Arjona	3:57

Remix featuring Chenoa
No.	Title	Writer(s)	Length
1.	"Pingüinos En La Cama" (featuring Chenoa)	Ricardo Arjona	3:44

== Charts ==
"Pingüinos En La Cama" became the first song by Arjona not to chart inside the top 25 of the Billboard Latin Songs chart. It reached a position of No.44 the week ending 29 April 2006. The song was more successful on the Latin Pop Songs chart, reaching No.19 the week ending 19 February 2006.

Chart (2006)	Peak position
US Hot Latin Songs (Billboard)	44
US Latin Pop Airplay (Billboard)	19

== Release history ==
Digital releases
Country	Date	Format	Label
Worldwide	January 2006	Mainstream radio	Sony BMG Music Latin
Worldwide	April 2006	Music video	Sony BMG Music Latin
United States	5 April 2011	Digital download (re-release)	Warner Music Mexico
