= Panteón Rococó =

Mexican ska band

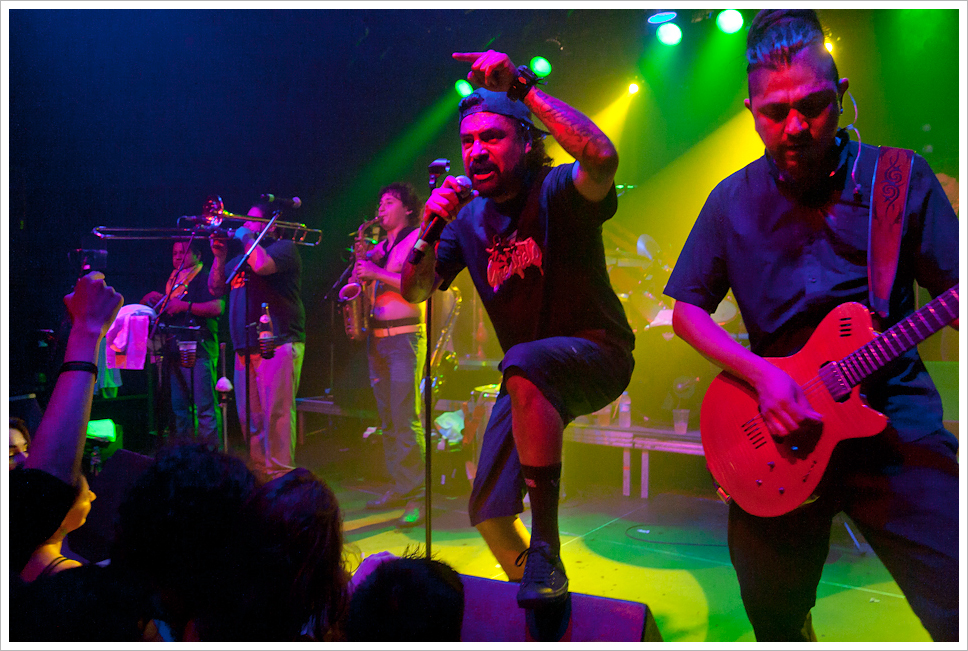
- Panteón Rococó in 2014

Background information
- Origin: Mexico City, Mexico
- Genres: Ska
- Years active: 1995–present
- Labels: Sony-BMG, Übersee Records (in Europe)
- Members: Dr. Shenka – vocals Dario Espinosa – Bass; Hiram Paniagua – drums Leonel Rosales – Guitar; Felipe Bustamante – Keyboard; Paco Barajas – Trombone; Gorri – Guitar; Missael – Saxophone Tanis – percussion
- Website: www.panteonrococo.com

Panteón Rococó is a ska band from Mexico City founded in 1995. Despite flourishing black markets, they have sold thousands of records. Their name is taken from the play El cocodrilo solitario del panteón rococó ("The lonely crocodile from the rococo graveyard") by the Mexican playwright Hugo Argüelles. Since early in their musical career they have regularly toured Europe, especially Germany, where they were represented by the now-defunct independent label Übersee Records.

== Musical style and lyrics ==
Panteón Rococó blends several styles of popular music such as rock, punk, salsa, mariachi, reggae, ska, and also mestizo-music into a very energetic, groovy sound. They are very politically active and support the EZLN in Chiapas. Some of their lyrics contain political statements, while many other works are love songs.

== Group members ==
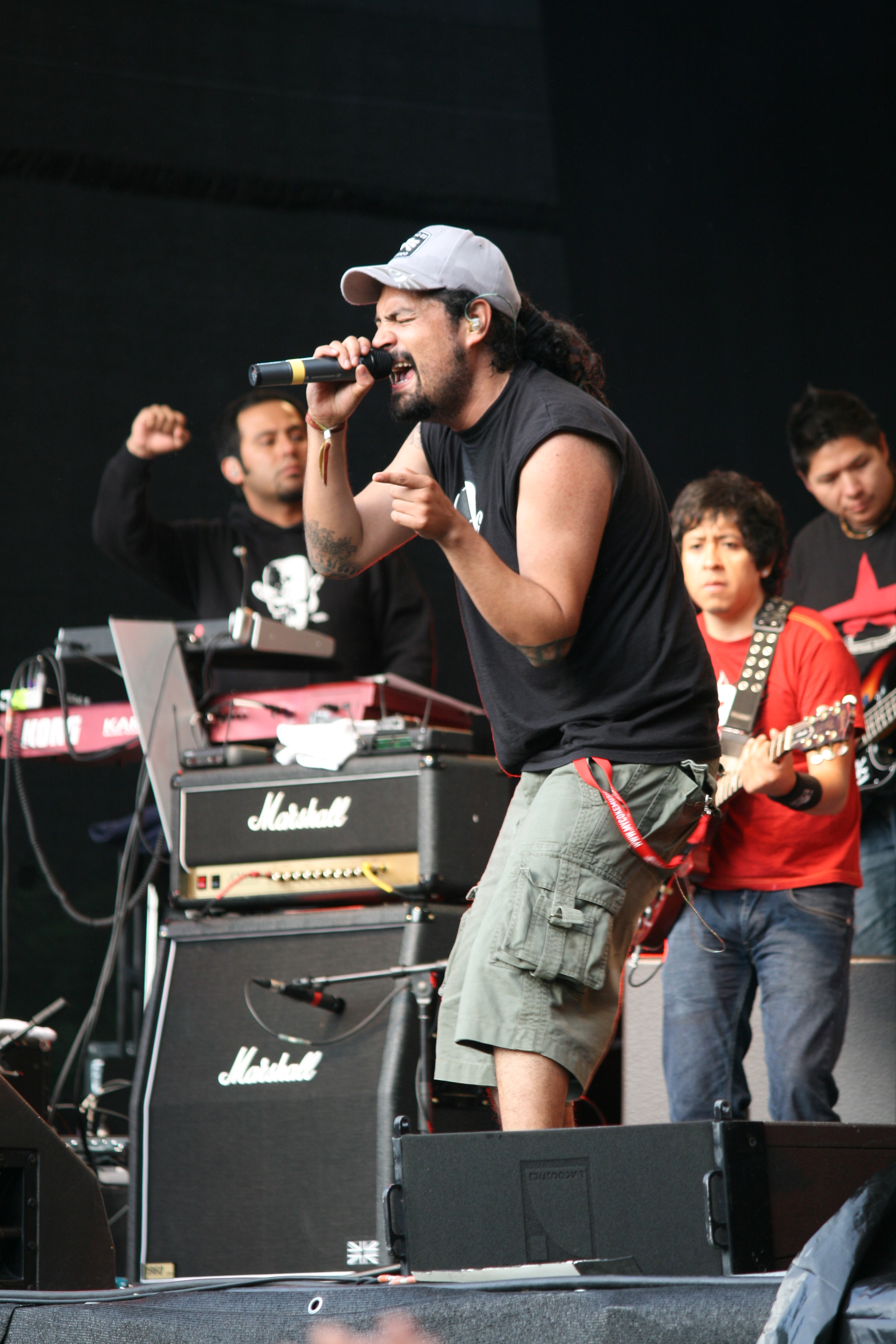
Dr. Shenka – Vocals

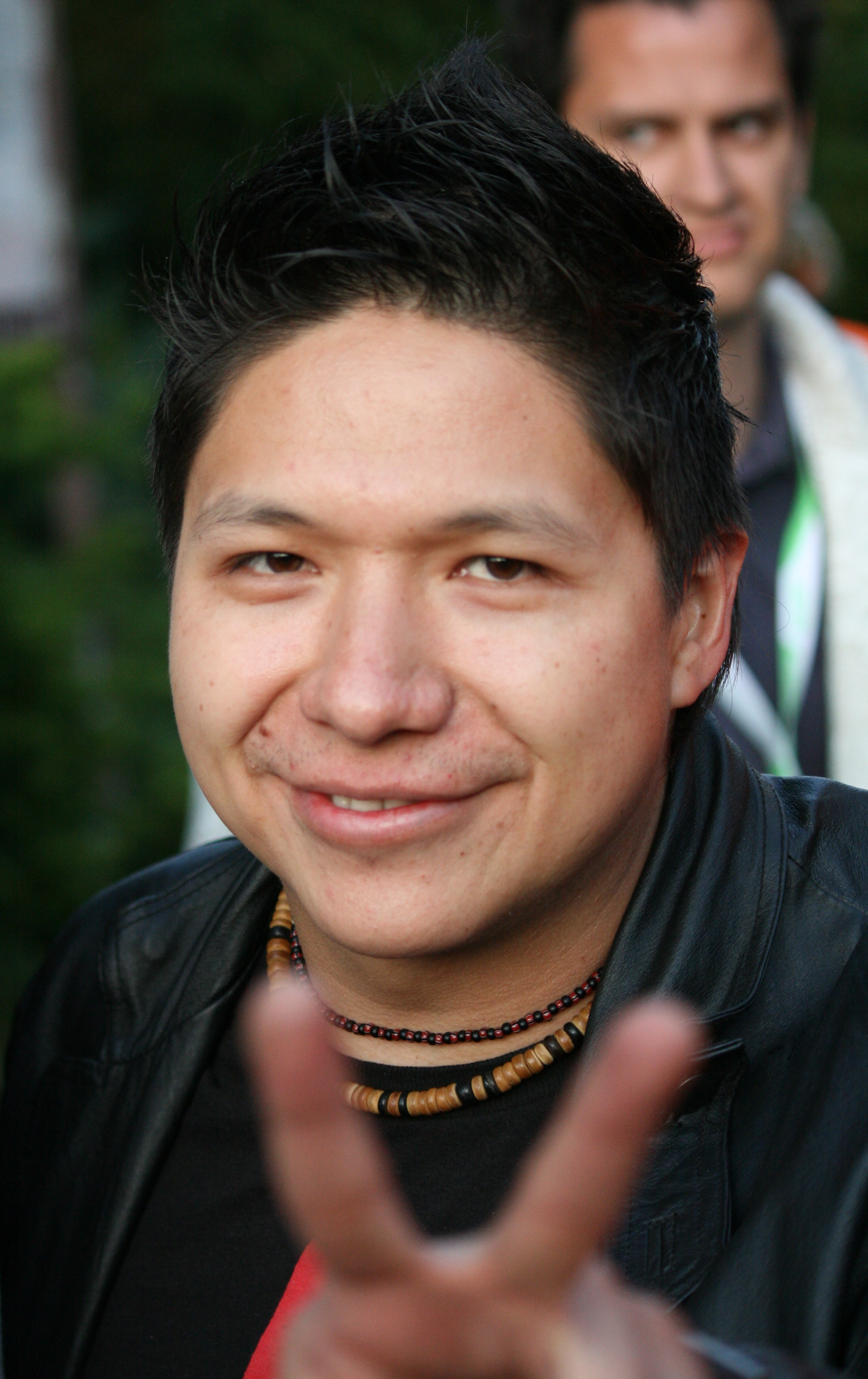
Dario Espinosa – Bass

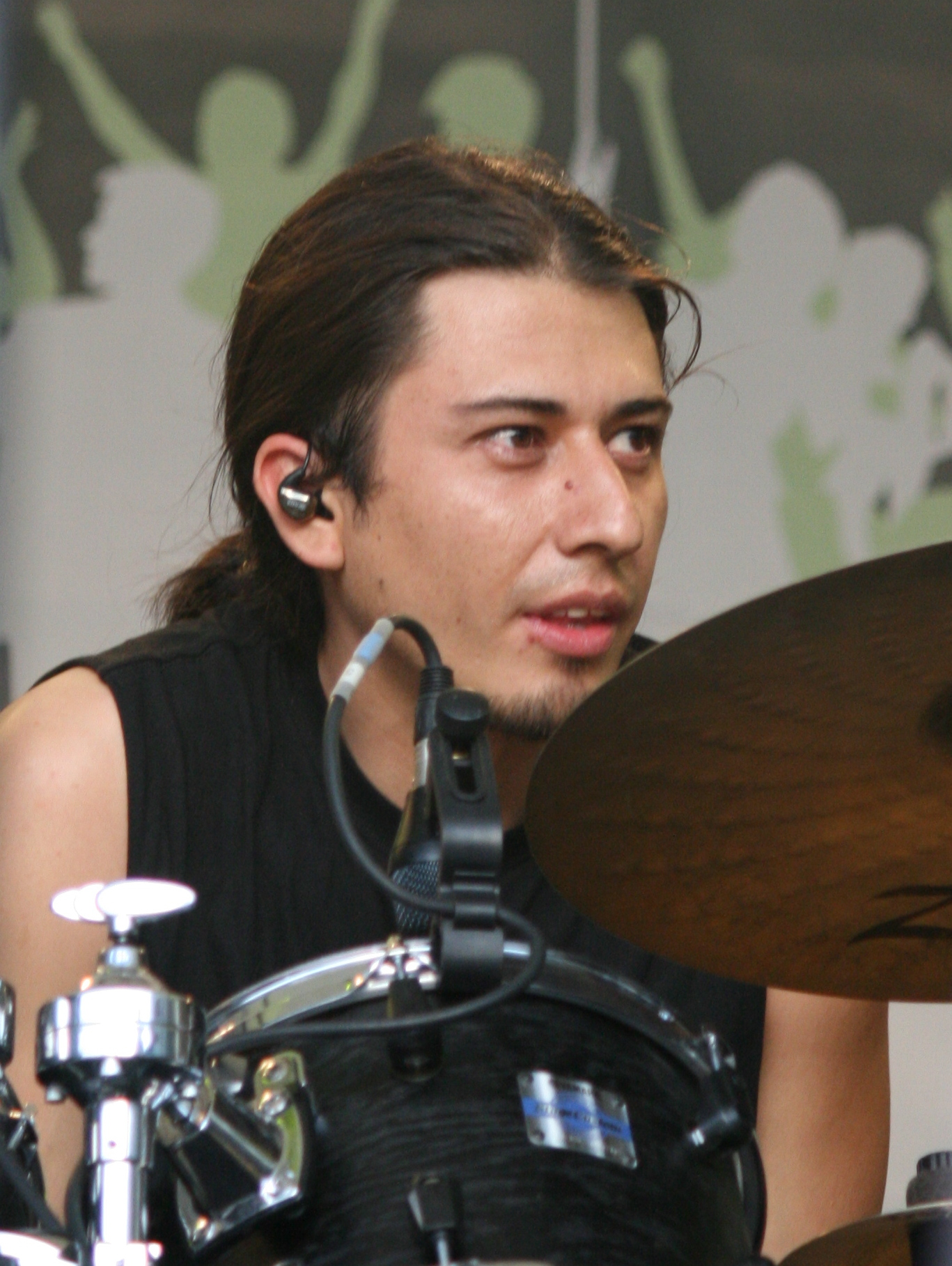
Hiram Paniagua – Drums

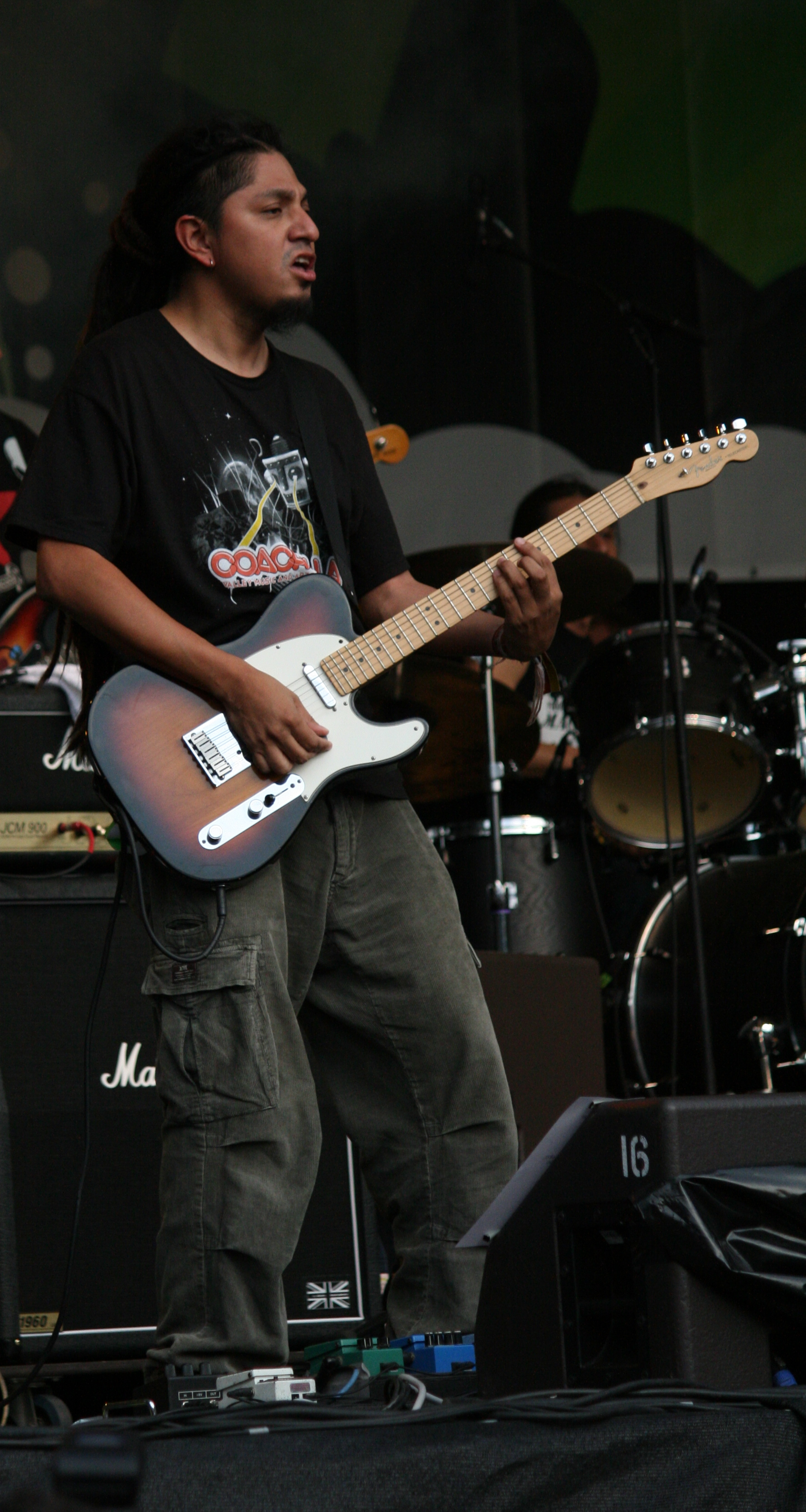
Leonel Rosales – Guitar

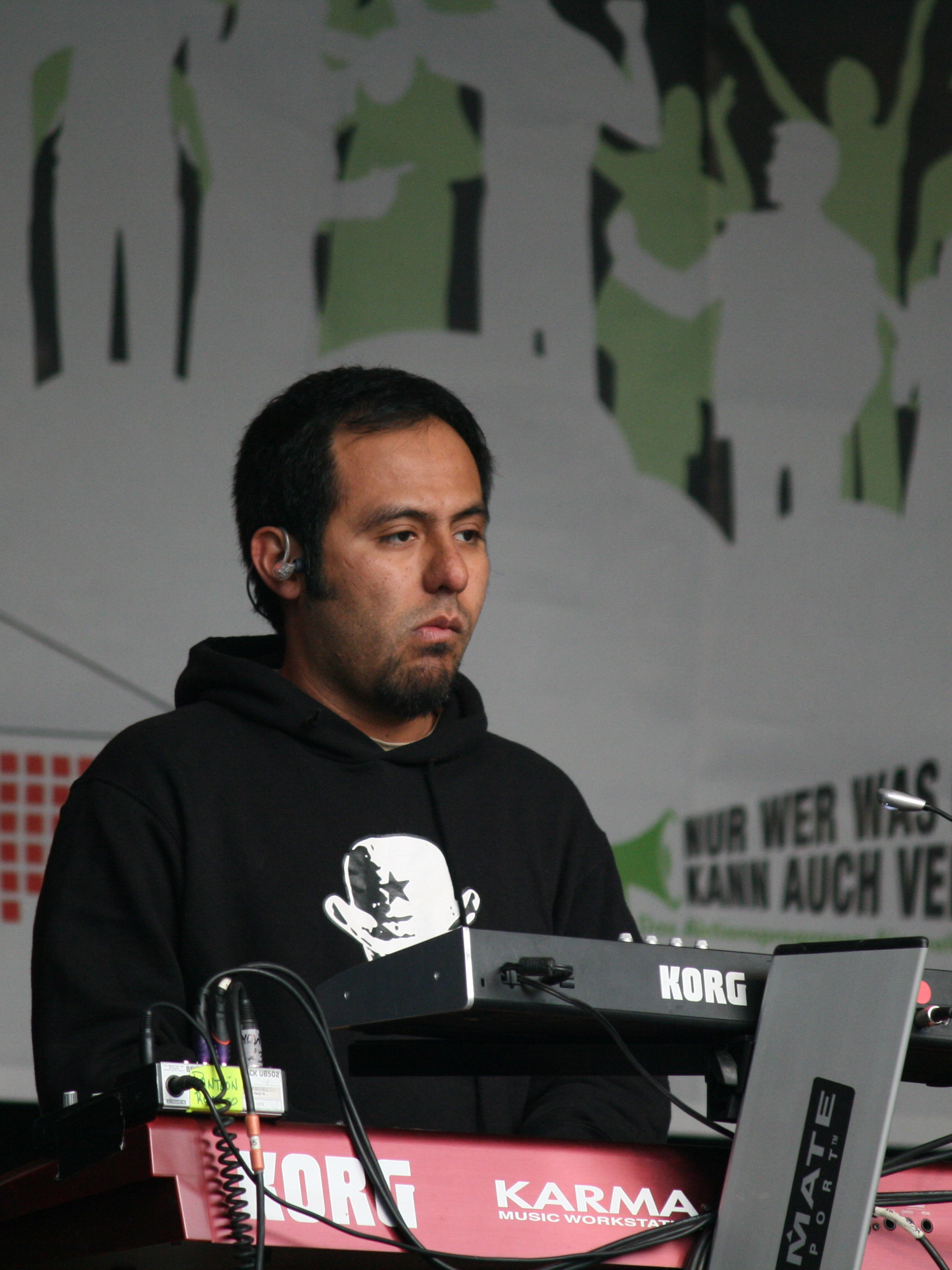
Felipe Bustamante – Keyboard

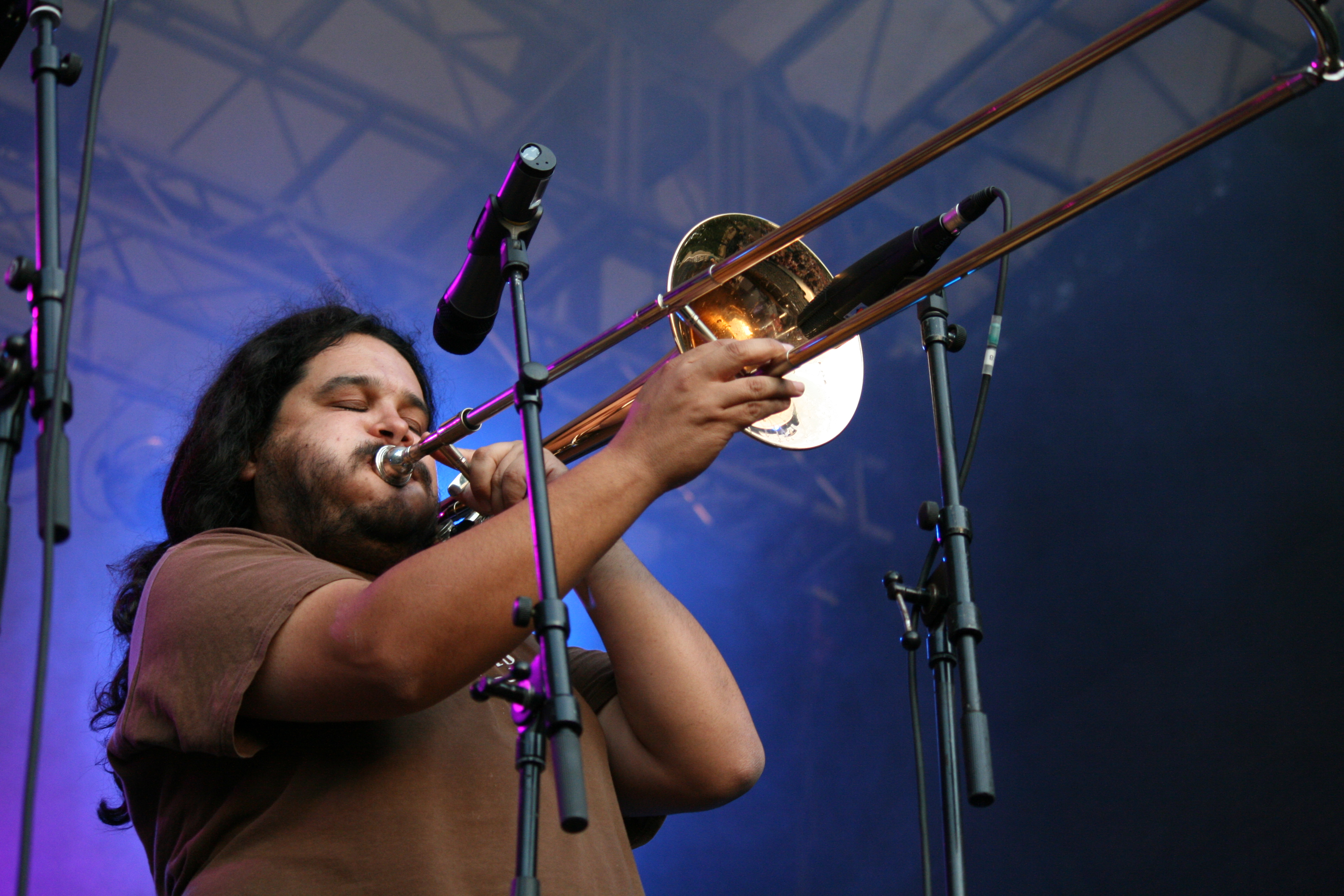
Paco Barajas – Trombone

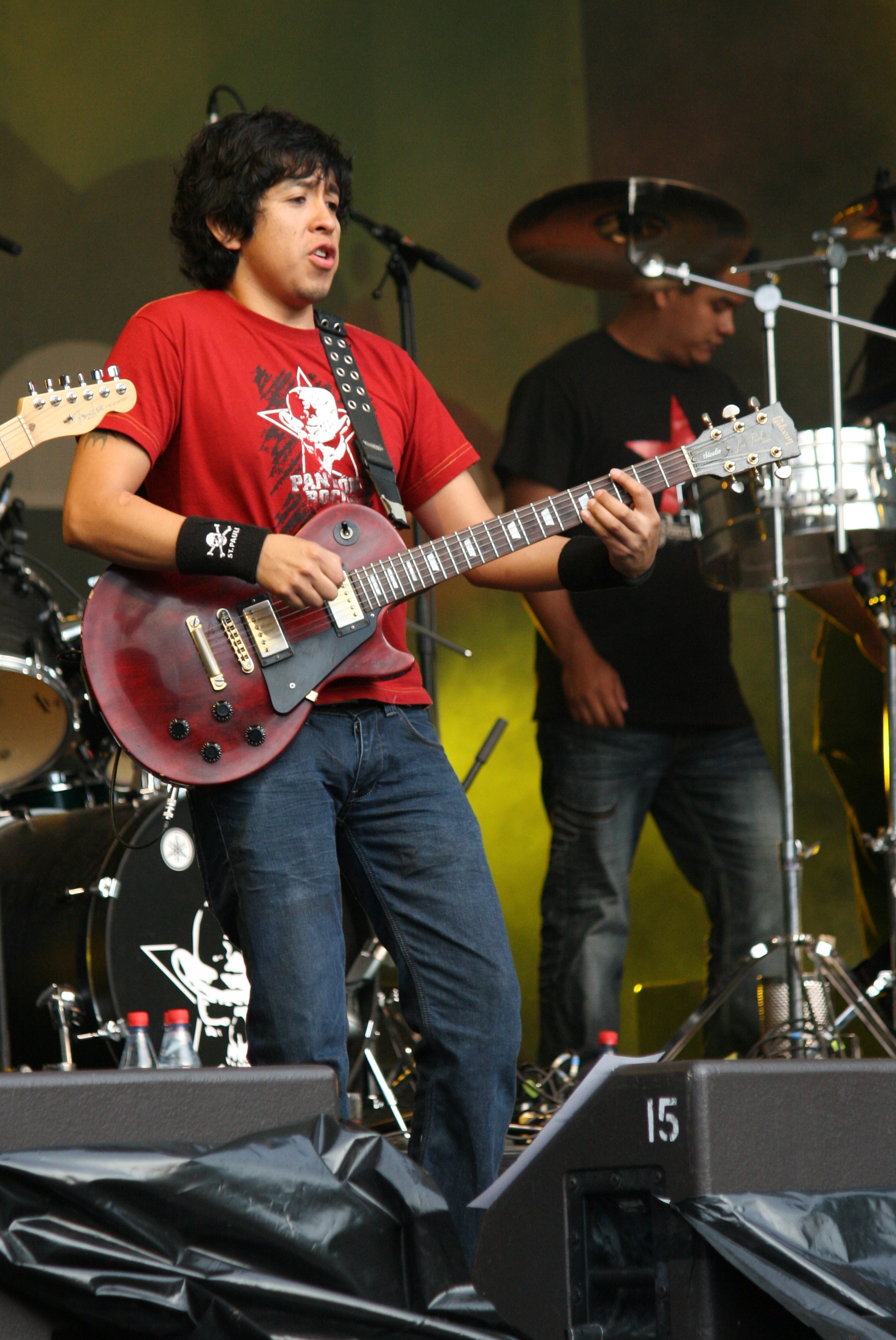
Gorri – Guitar

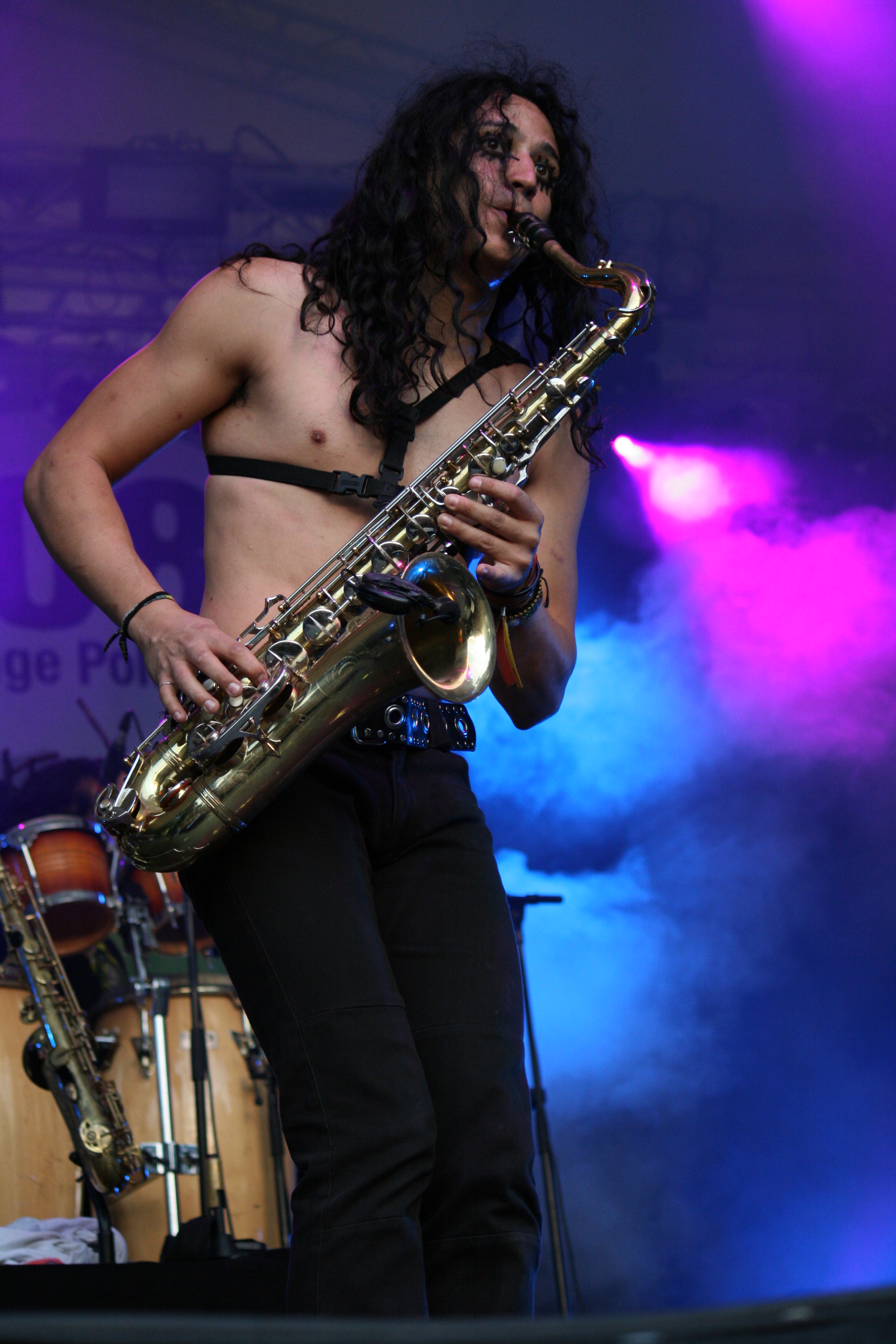
Missael – Saxophone

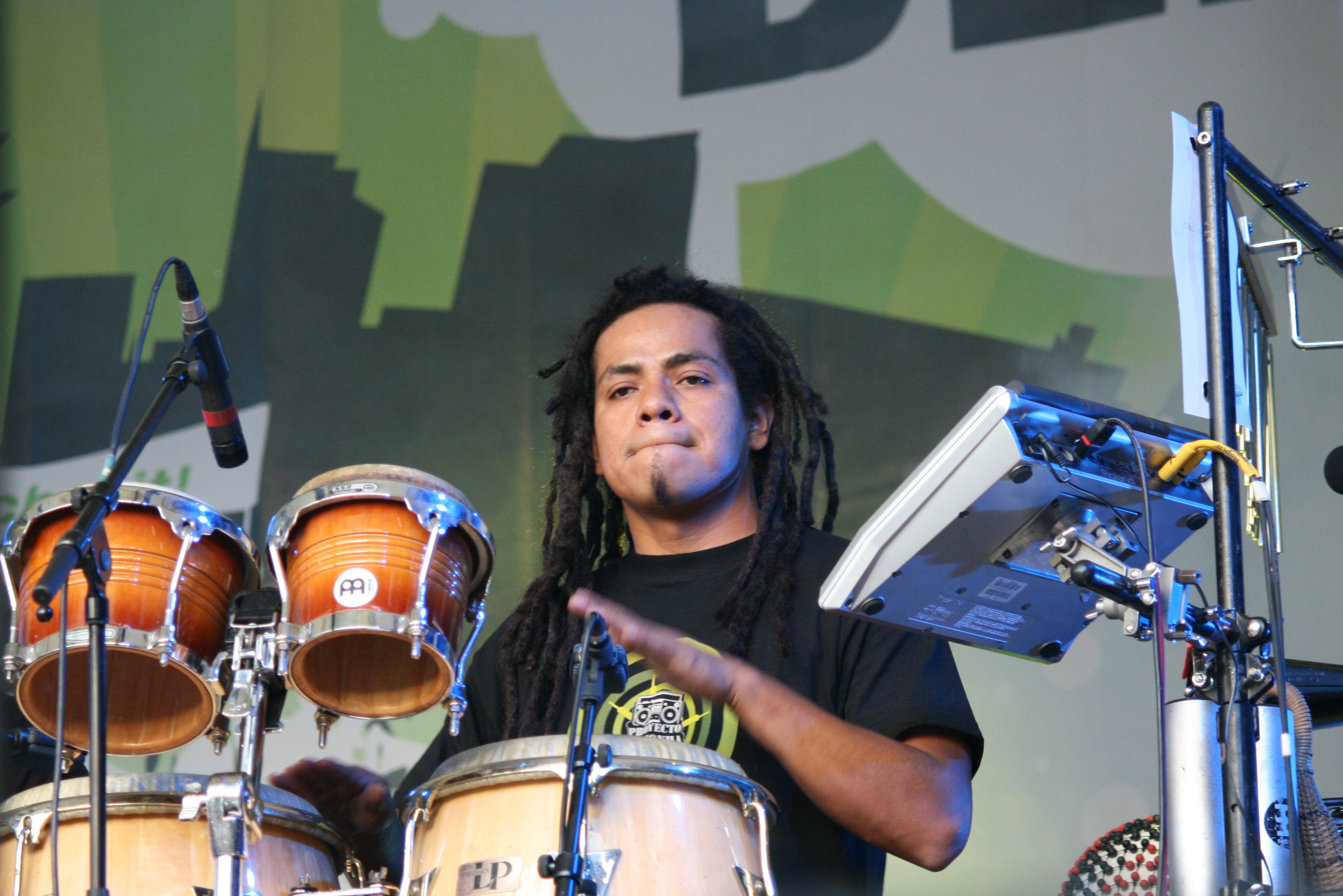
Tanis – Percussion

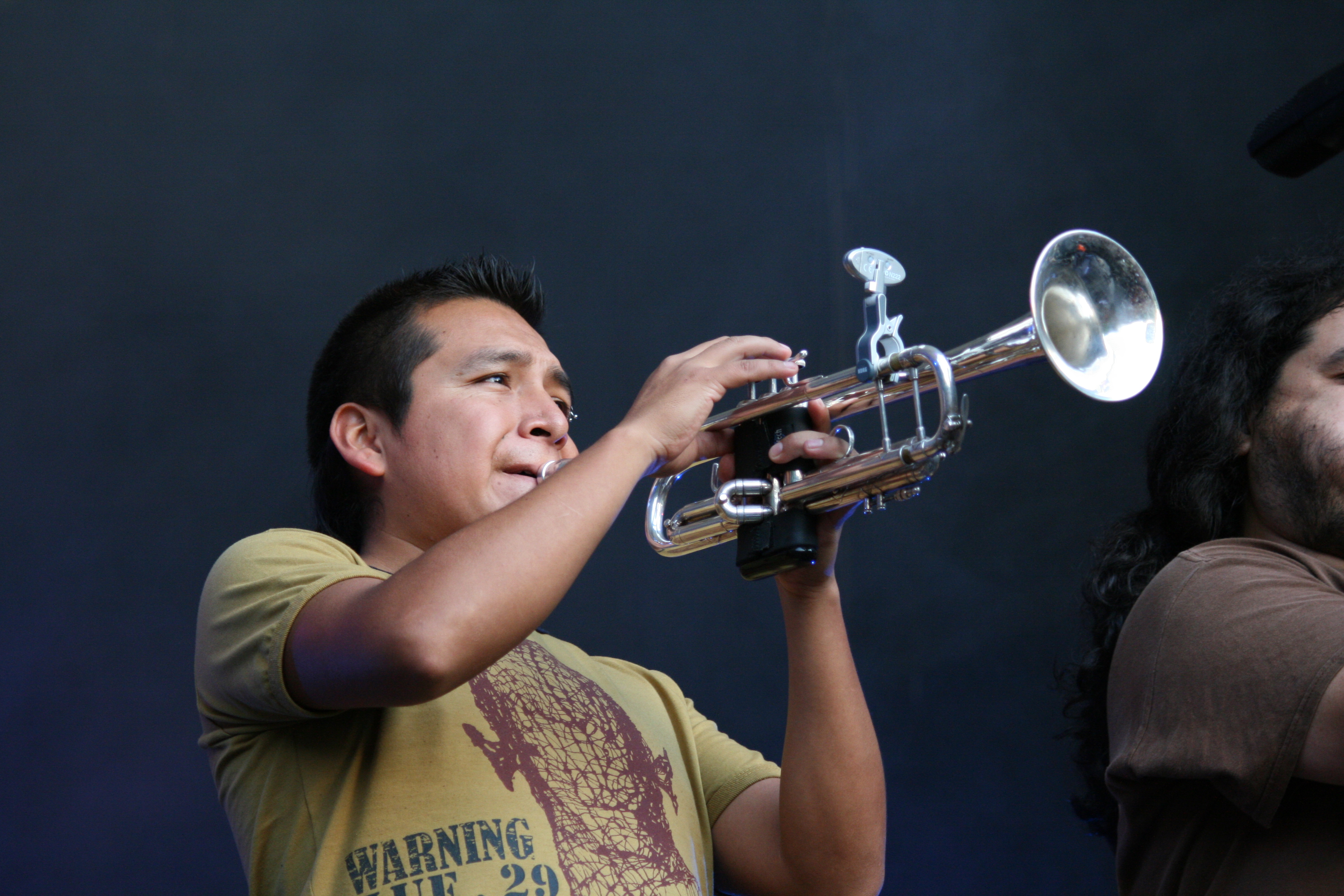
Pascal Montaño – guest musician, trumpet

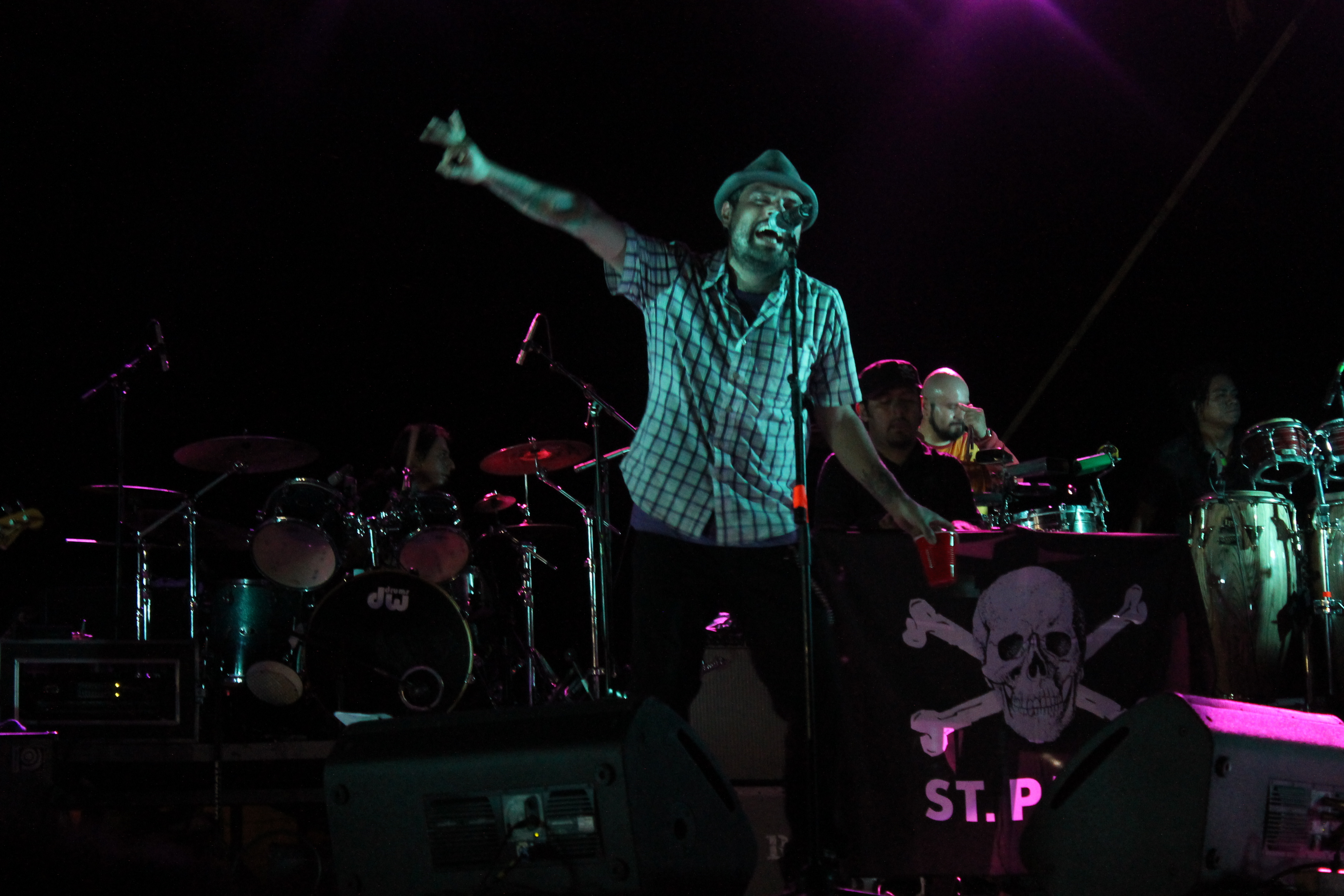
"Antes de que se acabe" 2011

== Discography ==
=== Albums ===
- 1997: Toloache pa' mi Negra
- 1999: A la Izquierda de la Tierra
- 2002: Compañeros Musicales
- 2004: Tres Veces Tres
- 2006: 10 Años: Un Panteon Muy Vivo
- 2007: Panteón Rococó
- 2010: Ejército de Paz
- 2012: Ni Carne Ni Pescado
- 2016: XX Años: En Vivo
- 2019: Infiernos
- 2021: Ofrenda
- 2025: Sonoro

=== Contributions on compilations ===
- 1998: "Skuela de Baile Vol. 1" with L'América
- 1998: "Skuela de Baile Vol. 2" with Cúrame (Ver. '98)
- 2003: "Sin ton ni Sonia" with Sonia and La rubia y el demonio
- 2003: "Tributo a José Alfredo Jiménez XXX" with Tu recuerdo y yo
- 2003: "Ofrenda a Rockdrigo González" with Los intelectuales
- 2011: "Carnaval Toda la Vida!" with Gallo Rojo
- 2018: infiernos *invitados especiales*
