= El Problema =

Single by Ricardo Arjona

from the album Santo Pecado
- Released: 14 October 2002
- Recorded: 2002
- Genre: Latin pop
- Length: 5:31 (Album version)
- Label: Sony Discos; Warner Music Latina
- Songwriter: Ricardo Arjona
- Producers: Ricardo Arjona; Carlos Cabral Junior

Ricardo Arjona singles chronology
"A Cara o Cruz" (2001)	"El Problema" (2002)	"Minutos" (2003)

"El Problema" ("The Problem") is a Latin pop song written, produced and performed by Guatemalan Grammy Award winning singer-songwriter Ricardo Arjona. It was released as the lead single from his ninth studio album, Santo Pecado (2002). It is also recognized as one of Ricardo Arjona's signature songs.

Critically and commercially successful, the song became a hit by the singer, staying at No.1 for eight consecutive weeks at the Billboard Hot Latin Songs and twelve weeks at No.1 on the Latin Pop Songs chart, both being the most by any of his singles to date.

== Reception ==
On the success of the song, Arjona commented that "it is an accident that happens, and you doesn't now how it is about. I thought 'El Problema' wasn't a song that could sound on radio and it happened." Mario Tarradell from The Dallas Morning News commented that "filled with lengthy verses and a gospellike chorus, the cut hardly sounds like your usual drive-time fodder."

== Music video ==
The music video for "El Problema" was filmed between November 16 and 18, 2002 in Barcelona, Spain. The video features the singer chasing a woman throughout the city to finally find her at the La Sagrada Familia, Barcelona's biggest church, in which he is arrested by the police and sent to prison.

== Track listing ==
Digital Download
No.	Title	Writer(s)	Length
1.	"El Problema"	Ricardo Arjona	5:31

== Chart performance ==
"El Problema" became a huge commercial success for Arjona. The song debuted at No.27 on the Billboard Latin Songs chart the week ending November 2, 2002. The following week it jumped to No.11, receiving the "Greatest Gainer" honor for that week. On the week ending November 16, "El Problema" jumped to No.9, thus becoming Arjona's third song to reach the top 10, after "Desnuda" and "Cuando", both of which reached No.1 in 2000. The week ending December 7, 2002, "El Problema" reached No.1 on the chart, and stayed there for eight consecutive weeks. On the Latin Pop Songs chart, it debuted at No.17 on the week ending November 2, 2002, and reached No.1 on the week ending November 30. The song stayed at No.1 for nine consecutive weeks. It is, to date, the longest-running number-one single by the Guatemalan singer on both charts.

=== Weekly charts ===
Chart (2002–03)	Peak position
US Hot Latin Songs (Billboard)	1
US Latin Pop Airplay (Billboard)	1

=== Yearly charts ===
Chart (2003)	Peak position
US Billboard Latin Songs	4
US Billboard Latin Pop Songs	3

=== Decade-End charts ===
Chart (2000–2009)	Peak position
US Billboard Latin Songs	89
US Billboard Latin Pop Songs	33

== Release history ==
Country	Date	Format	Label
United Kingdom	October 2002	CD single	Sony Music
United States	January 19, 2010	Digital download (re-release)	Sony Music
