= De Vez En Mes =

Single by Ricardo Arjona

from the album Adentro
- Released: April 7, 2005
- Recorded: 2005
- Genre: Latin pop
- Length: 4:22
- Label: Sony BMG Music
- Songwriter: Ricardo Arjona
- Producers: Ricardo Arjona, Dan Warner, Lee Levin, Tommy Torres

Ricardo Arjona singles chronology
"Mojado" (2006)	"De Vez En Mes" (2005)	"Quién" (2007)

"De Vez En Mes" is a written by Guatemalan singer-songwriter Ricardo Arjona for his tenth Studio album, Adentro (2005). The song was released on April 7, 2005, as the fourth single from the album.

== Composition ==
"De Vez En Mes" is a Latin pop ballad song written by Arjona. It was produced by Arjona with Dan Warner, Lee Levin and additional help from Tommy Torres. The lyrics of the song are related to a woman's menstruation. The song received negative response due to its theme, on which the singer commented that the song had "the most beautiful lyrics from Adentro", further stating that "more than hit me, they [the criticism] saddens me." He also stated that "criticism is a symptom of envy."

== Music video ==
The music video was shot in black and white and features a woman who is seen on places inside a house throughout the video.

== Trackslisting ==
Digital Download
No.	Title	Writer(s)	Length
1.	"De Vez En Mes"	Ricardo Arjona	4:22

== Charts ==
Chart (2006)	Peak position
US Hot Latin Songs (Billboard)	49
US Latin Pop Airplay (Billboard)	16

== Release history ==
Digital releases
Country	Date	Format	Label
United States	April 7, 2006	Digital download	Sony Music
Canada	April 7, 2006	Digital download	Sony Music
Mexico	April 7, 2006	Digital download	Sony Music
