= Mojado (song) =

Single by Ricardo Arjona

from the album Adentro
- Released: October 2005 (Mexico); January 2006
- Recorded: 2005
- Genre: Latin pop, Norteño
- Length: 4:43
- Label: Sony BMG Music
- Songwriter: Ricardo Arjona
- Producers: Ricardo Arjona, Carlos Cabral Jr

Ricardo Arjona singles chronology
"Pingüinos En La Cama" (2006)	"Mojado" (2005)	"A Ti" (2007)

Intocable singles chronology
"Es Mejor Decir Adios" (2005)	"Mojado" (2005)	"Contra Viento y Marea" (2005)

"Mojado" is a latin pop song a written by Guatemalan singer-songwriter Ricardo Arjona for his tenth Studio album, Adentro (2005). It was released in 2006 as the lead single from the album in Mexico, but the third single from the album overall.

== Composition ==
"Mojado" has norteño and tejano music influences, mainly driven by the presence of Mexican band Intocable as featured artists on the song. Lyrically, the song revolves around immigration, telling the story of a man who abandons his country to another in search of a better quality of life.

== Trackslisting ==
Digital Download
No.	Title	Writer(s)	Length
1.	"Mojado" (featuring Intocable)	Ricardo Arjona	4:43

== Charts ==
Chart (2006)	Peak position
US Hot Latin Songs (Billboard)	34
US Latin Pop Airplay (Billboard)	30
