= Adentro =

Studio album by Ricardo Arjona
- Released: December 6, 2005
- Recorded: 2005; Veracruz, Mexico (Cabanna Studios); Los Angeles, California (Capitol Studios, Conway Studios); Monterrey, Mexico (El Cielo); Miami, Florida (Hit factory Criteria, Jet Wash Studios, macondo Studios, Outline Studios, Red Door Studios, The Tiki Room, Swanky Groove Studios); Mexico City (Jocoteco Studios); Nashville, Tennessee (Sound Kitchen)
- Genres: Latin pop; rock; alternative rock
- Length: 50:31
- Label: Sony BMG Norte
- Producers: Ricardo Arjona; Tommy Torres; Carlos Cabral "Junior"; Fernando Otero; Juan Vicente Zambrano

Ricardo Arjona chronology
Solo (2004)	Adentro (2005)	Quién Dijo Ayer (2007)

Singles from Adentro
- 1. "Acompañame A Estar Solo" Released: October 17, 2005; 2. "Mojado" Released: November 17, 2005; 3. "Pingüinos En La Cama" Released: 2006; 4. "A Ti" Released: 2006; 5. "De Vez En Mes" Released: 2006

Adentro (English: Inside) is the tenth studio album by Guatemalan singer-songwriter Ricardo Arjona, released on December 6, 2005, by Sony Music Entertainment. Recorded in the United States and Mexico, the album was produced by Arjona himself, as well as Dan Warner and Lee Levin (under their stage name Los Gringos), Puerto Rican singer-songwriter Tommy Torres, and long-time collaborator Carlos Cabral Jr. The album marks the first collaboration between Arjona and Cabral, who would subsequently become a regular contributor in following albums by the singer.

Arjona experimented with prominent Latin sounds for Adentro, such as Mexican and Tejano music on "Mojado", as well as some Colombian and bachata elements on "Adiós Melancolía". Adentro was named "Arjona's most personal album", and his performance style was classified as "confident", with a "relevant-as-ever lyricism". It was named best Latin Pop Album for 2007 at the 49th Grammy Awards in Los Angeles.

Adentro became Arjona's fifth consecutive album to reach the top ten on the US Billboard Top Latin Albums chart, peaking at number three. On the Latin Pop Albums chart, it attained a peak of number two. Adentro was certified two times Platinum in Mexico, five times Platinum in Argentina and two times Platinum (Latin) in the United States. As of February 2006, the album has sold more than one million copies worldwide.

Five singles were released from the album. American lead single, "Acompañame A Estar Solo", became Arjona's fifth number-one single on the US Billboard Latin Pop Songs chart, and reached number seven on the Latin Songs chart. Mexican lead single "Mojado", featuring Mexican band Intocable, became a moderate success, as well as second American single "Pingüinos En La Cama", which single version features Spanish singer Chenoa. "A Ti" followed as the fourth single, peaking at number three on the Latin Pop Songs chart. "De Vez En Mes" was released as the fifth and final single from the album. To promote the album, Arjona embarked on a world tour, the Adentro Tour.

== Recording and composition ==
This was the first time Arjona collaborated with Tommy Torres. In an interview with Billboard magazine, the singer commented that he first "tested" Torres by sending him the "hookiest and darkest tracks" on the album, "Acompañame A Estar Solo" and "Iluso". Torres said that he "went all out on the first demo, hiring a full band that included a string orchestra", which grabbed the attention of Arjona. Arjona further commented that Adentro was "a very representative and tremendously complete album," adding that "having different producers made it rich in possibilities."

Evan Gutierrez from AllMusic considered the record's instrumentation, performance, and overall sonic palette to be "minimalist" and "unassuming". Arjona experimented with prominent Latin sounds for Adentro, such as Mexican and Tejano music on "Mojado", a duet with Mexican band Intocable about immigration. Ricky Muñoz, the vocalist of the group, said that the group met Arjona in Monterrey, and that they were in contact with Arjona through Carlos Cabral, one of Adentro's producers, who had also worked with them formerly. Muñoz additionally reflected: "We admire Arjona. We liked the song and then we recorded it [with him]. It is very cool that he invited us [as featured artists]." "Adiós Melancolía" is mainly composed as a bachata song with Colombian influences. "No Te Cambio Por Nada" is intermittently rock-dabbled. The lyrics of "De Vez En Mes" pertain to a woman's menstruation.

== Promotion ==
In 2006, Arjona commenced the first leg of his world tour, named the Adentro Tour, to promote the album. The tour resumed in 2007 for a second leg, in which he visited more countries. Approximately two million people attended his concerts throughout his world tour. The tour officially closed in front of more than 100,00 people during the International Fair on 14 September 2007, in the mainland city of Barquisimeto, Venezuela. In the United States, the tour had an attendance of 134,000 people, and grossed $8.2 million. Arjona founded the Fundación Adentro, a charity organization which provides music and singing education for poor children in Guatemala, in July 2008. Arjona commented that the main objective of the organization "isn't becoming an important foundation internationally, but to help child reach their dreams." The organization's development originated in 2005, prior to the release of Adentro, from which the foundation received its name. Its headquarters are located in Mexico City.

"Acompañame A Estar Solo" was released as the lead single from Adentro on October 17, 2005. The song became his fifth chart-topper on the US Billboard Latin Pop Songs chart, reaching its peak in the week of 7 January 2006. It accumulated three consecutive weeks atop the cart. It reached number seven on the Latin Songs chart, becoming his twelfth top ten single on that chart. "Mojado" was released as the second single in Mexico on November 14, 2005, while served as the third single in other music markets. "Pingüinos En La Cama" was released as the second single in January 2007. Spanish singer Chenoa is featured as a guest artist on the single version of the song. On the Latin Songs chart, it peaked at number 44. The song was more successful on the Latin Pop Songs chart, reaching number 19. It was the first time Arjona released two lead singles from an album, as it was recommended by his label. It peaked at number 34 on the Latin Songs chart, and number 30 on the Latin Pop Songs chart. "A Ti" was released as the fourth single of the album in March 2006. The song was more successful than its two predecessors, peaking at number 14 on the Latin Songs chart, and number three on the Latin Pop Songs chart. "A Ti" was later included on Arjona's compilation album Quién Dijo Ayer, as a duet with Italian singer Eros Ramazzoti. Arjona released "De Vez En Mes" as the fifth and final single from the album.

== Commercial performance ==
Adentro became Arjona's third studio album to debut inside the top five of the US Billboard Latin Albums and Latin Pop Albums charts, at numbers three and two, respectively. It equaled the peak position of Santo Pecado (2002) on the Latin Albums chart, and bested that album's peak on the Latin Pop Albums chart. Adentro also peaked at number 46 on the Top Heatseekers chart, and debuted at number 126 on the Billboard 200, besting the previous record held by Galería Caribe (2000), which peaked at number 136, among Arjona's albums. The album received a double platinum certification (Latin) by the Recording Industry Association of America (RIAA), denoting shipments of 200,000 copies. In Mexico, Adentro debuted at number one, and was subsequently certified double platinum by the Asociación Mexicana de Productores de Fonogramas y Videogramas (AMPROFON), signifying shipments of 200,000 copies. In Argentina, it was certified five times platinum by Argentine Chamber of Phonograms and Videograms Producers (CAPIF) for sales exceeding 200,000 copies in that country. It became Arjona's third album to do so, after Santo Pecado and Historias (1994). As of February 2006, Adentro has sold more than 1,000,000 copies worldwide.

== Critical reception ==
Professional ratings
Review scores
Source	Rating
AllMusic	4/5 stars
Billboard	favorable

The album received critical acclaim. AllMusic writer Evan Gutierrez gave it four stars out of five and lauded its "stripped, natural production value", Arjona's "confident" vocal performance, its "relevant-as-ever" lyricism, and the record's sonic palette as brilliantly variant. Gutierrez further opined that the album pleases both Arjona's fans and "the execs at Norte." Leila Cobo of Billboard dubbed it lyrically "Arjona's most personal album", favored its rock elements, and praised its cohesiveness. Cobo concluded: "It is hard to be touching, relevant and musically compelling all at once, but Arjona pulls it off."

== Track listing ==
All tracks are written by Ricardo Arjona.

No.	Title	Producer(s)	Length
1.	"Para Bien o Para Mal"	Tommy Torres	5:20
2.	"De Vez En Mes"	Torres, Lee Levin	4:22
3.	"Para Que Me Quieras Como Quiero"	Torres, Dan Warner, Levin,	4:37
4.	"Pingüinos En La Cama"	Torres, Warner, Levin	3:48
5.	"Iluso"	Ricardo Arjona, Carlos Cabral "Junior", Fernando Otero	6:47
6.	"Adiós Melancolía"	Arjona, Cabral, Otero	4:55
7.	"Mojado" (featuring Intocable)	Carlos Cabral	4:43
8.	"Acompañame A Estar Solo"	Arjona, Cabral, Otero	4:32
9.	"No Me Importa Nada"	Arjona, Cabral, Otero	4:29
10.	"Laura"	Juan Vicente Zambrano	4.26
11.	"No Te Cambio Por Nada"	Arjona, Cabral,	3:51
12.	"Pa' Que"	Cabral	4:01
13.	"Ya No Me Acuerdo de Mi"	Torres, Levin, Warner	4:43
14.	"A Ti"	Cabral	4:50
15.	"Bar"	Arjona	5:00
16.	"Pingüinos En La Cama" (Piano & Strings version)	Torres, Arjona, Cabral	3.58

== Chart performance ==
=== Weekly charts ===
Chart (2005–2006)	Peak position
US Billboard 200	126
US Top Latin Albums (Billboard)	3
US Latin Pop Albums (Billboard)	2
US Heatseekers Albums (Billboard)	46
Mexican Albums (Top 100 Mexico)	1
Spanish Albums (Promusicae)	73
Uruguayan Albums (CUD)	1
Venezuelan Albums (Recordland)	1

=== Yearly charts ===
Chart (2005)	Peak position
Mexican Albums (Top 100 Mexico)	50

Chart (2006)	Peak position
Mexican Albums (Top 100 Mexico)	19
US Latin Albums (Billboard)	13
US Latin Pop Albums (Billboard)	8

=== Sales and certifications ===
Region	Certification	Certified units/sales
Argentina (CAPIF)	5× Platinum	200,000^{^}
Mexico (AMPROFON)	2× Platinum	200,000^{^}
United States (RIAA)	2× Platinum (Latin)	200,000^{^}
Summaries
Worldwide	—	1,000,000
^{^} Shipments figures based on certification alone.

== See also ==
- List of best-selling albums in Argentina
