= List of awards and nominations received by Celia Cruz =

Celia Cruz awards and nominations
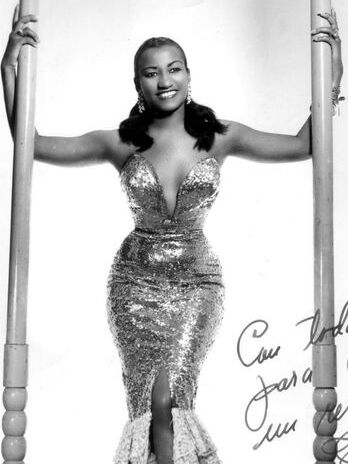
- Celia Cruz in 1957
Awards and nominations
Award	Wins	Nominations
ASCAP Latin Awards	3	3
Billboard Latin Music Awards	4	14
Billboard Number One Awards	1	9
Grammy Awards	3	9
Latin American Music Awards	0	5
Latin Grammy Awards	4	7
Lo Nuestro Awards	6	13
Premios Juventud	4	4

Totals (Note: Certain award groups do not simply award one winner. They acknowledge several different recipients, have runners-up, and have third place. Since this is a specific recognition and is different from losing an award, runner-up mentions are considered wins in this award tally. For simplification and to avoid errors, each award in this list has been presumed to have had a prior nomination.)
- Wins: 121
- Nominations: 173

Celia Cruz (1925 –2003) was a Salsa music singer and actress winner of multiples accolades. Heralded as the Queen of Salsa Music, or Queen of Latin Music, Celia is one of the best-selling Latin music artists, with over 10 million records sold. Her career spanned 50-years-plus, and was recognized by the Guinness World Records as the "longest career as a salsa artist" in 2003.

Celia Cruz won her first award in Cuba at a popular radio show in 1947. Through her career, she amassed varios major awards, including Billboard Latin Music Awards, Grammy Awards, Latin Grammy Awards and Lo Nuestro Awards. By 1982, she won an estimated 100 international awards.

Celia received special recognitions both in her life and posthumously for her success and trayectory, including the first ASCAP Latin Heritage Award, and the inaugural Lo Nuestro Excellence Award in 1990. She was also the first artist inducted into the Billboard Latin Music Hall of Fame in 1994 alongside Cachao López. She has been admitted into other halls and walks of fame, including Plaza de las Estrellas (Mexico) and the Hollywood Walk of Fame.

Outside of her work in music, she was recognized for her philanthropic endeavors, including a Hispanic Heritage Awards, as well The Recording Academy's Heroes Award in 1999. In addition, Celia Cruz was condecorated with various major civil awards, including by presidents of the United States and Colombia, as well honorary degrees by some universities. She became the first Latin musical performer to be given the Ellis Island Honors Society, and the first Afro Latina to have her likeness appear on an U.S. currency.

== Awards and nominations ==
Award/organization (Note: Charts are not included, unless they are explicitly described as "awards" or specific trophies are given.)	Year	Nominee/work	Category	Result	Ref.
ACCA Award	1994	Celia Cruz	Pan Art	Honoree	
ASCAP Latin Awards	1998	Celia Cruz	Special Recognition	Honoree	
ASCAP Latin Awards	1999	Celia Cruz	ASCAP Latin Heritage Award	Honoree	
ASCAP Latin Awards	2016	"La Negra Tiene Tumbao"	Television winning-songs	Won	
Association of Latin Entertainment Critics (Latin ACE)	1969	Celia Cruz	International Artist of the Year	Won	
Association of Latin Entertainment Critics (Latin ACE)	1970	Celia Cruz	International Artist of the Year	Won	
Association of Latin Entertainment Critics (Latin ACE)	1972	Show de Celia Cruz (at Chateau Madrid)	Best Show in a Club Night	Won	
Association of Latin Entertainment Critics (Latin ACE)	1978	Celia Cruz	Female Figure of the Year	Won	
Association of Latin Entertainment Critics (Latin ACE)	1980	Celia Cruz	Best Salsa Artist, Female	Won	
Association of Latin Entertainment Critics (Latin ACE)	1981	Celia, Johnny y El Conde	Best Salsa Album	Nominated	
Association of Latin Entertainment Critics (Latin ACE)	1983	Celia Cruz	Best Salsa Female Artist	Nominated	
Association of Latin Entertainment Critics (Latin ACE)	1983	Feliz encuentro (with Sonora Matancera)	Best Salsa Album	Won	
Association of Latin Entertainment Critics (Latin ACE)	1984	Tremendo Trio	Best Salsa Album	Won	
Association of Latin Entertainment Critics (Latin ACE)	1987	Celia Cruz	Extraordinary Ace Award	Honoree	
Association of Latin Entertainment Critics (Latin ACE)	1990	Celia Cruz	Tropical Female Artist	Won	
Association of Latin Entertainment Critics (Latin ACE)	1993	Celia Cruz	Extraordinary Ace Award	Honoree	
Association of Latin Entertainment Critics (Latin ACE)	1994	Celia Cruz	Female Act of the Year	Won	
Association of Latin Entertainment Critics (Latin ACE)	1995	Celia Cruz	Extraordinary Ace Award	Honoree	
Association of Latin Entertainment Critics (Latin ACE)	1995	"Que le Den Candela"	Video of the Year	Won	
Association of Latin Entertainment Critics (Latin ACE)	1996	Celia Cruz	Extraordinary Ace Award	Honoree	
Association of Latin Entertainment Critics (Latin ACE)	1999	Celia Cruz	Voices of the Millennium	Honoree	
Association of Latin Entertainment Critics (Latin ACE)	1999	Mi vida es cantar	Album of the Year, Female	Nominated	
Association of Latin Entertainment Critics (Latin ACE)	2000	Celia Cruz	Voices of the Millennium	Honoree	
Association of Latin Entertainment Critics (Latin ACE)	2001	Siempre Viviré	Tropical Album of the Year	Won	
Association of Latin Entertainment Critics (Latin ACE)	2004	Celia Cruz: ¡Azúcar! (Telemundo 47)	Special of the Year	Won	
Billboard Latin Music Awards	1994	Celia Cruz	Hall of Fame	Inducted	
Billboard Latin Music Awards	2002	La Negra Tiene Tumbao	Tropical/Salsa Album of the Year, Female	Nominated	
Billboard Latin Music Awards	2003	"La Negra Tiene Tumbao"	Tropical/Salsa Airplay Track of the Year, Female	Nominated	
Billboard Latin Music Awards	2003	"La Salsa Vive" (Tito Nieves featuring Celia Cruz, Gilberto Santa Rosa, Cheo Feliciano, & Ismael Miranda)	Hot Latin Track of the Year, Vocal Duo	Nominated	
Billboard Latin Music Awards	2004	Celia Cruz	Top Latin Albums Artist of the Year	Won	
Billboard Latin Music Awards	2004	Exitos Eternos	Tropical Album of the Year, Female	Nominated	
Billboard Latin Music Awards	2004	Hits Mix	Tropical Album of the Year, Female	Nominated	
Billboard Latin Music Awards	2004	Regalo del Alma	Tropical Album of the Year, Female	Won	
Billboard Latin Music Awards	2004	Exitos Eternos	Latin Greatest Hits Album of the Year	Nominated	
Billboard Latin Music Awards	2004	Hits Mix	Latin Greatest Hits Album of the Year	Won	
Billboard Latin Music Awards	2004	"Ríe y Llora"	Tropical Airplay Track of the Year, Female	Nominated	
Billboard Latin Music Awards	2005	"Ella Tiene Fuego"	Tropical Airplay Track of the Year, Female	Nominated	
Billboard Latin Music Awards	2005	Dios Disfrute a la Reina	Tropical Album of the Year, Female	Nominated	
Billboard Latin Music Awards	2005	Salsa Divas (with La India)	Tropical Album of the Year, Female	Nominated	
Billboard Latin Women in Music	2025	Celia Cruz	Legend Award	Honoree	
Billboard Number One Awards (Note: Prior to the inauguration of the Billboard Music Awards in 1990, the magazine had the "Number One Awards" to honor the top-performing artists of the year on each of chart categories.)	1977	Only They Could Have Made This Album (with Willie Colón)	Latin Salsa National (Album)	Nominated	
Billboard Number One Awards	1977	Tremendo Cache (with Johnny Pacheco)	Latin Salsa National (Album)	Nominated	
Billboard Number One Awards	1977	Celia & Johnny (with Johnny Pacheco)	Latin Salsa National (Album)	Nominated	
Billboard Number One Awards	1978	Celia Cruz and Willie Colón	Latin Salsa Artist of the Year	Won	
Billboard Number One Awards	1979	Eternos (with Johnny Pacheco)	Top Latin Salsa Album	Nominated	
Billboard Number One Awards	1979	Greatest Hits (with Johnny Pacheco)	Top Latin Salsa Album	Nominated	
Billboard Number One Awards	1986	Celia Cruz and Tito Puente	Top Tropical/Salsa Artist	Nominated	
Billboard Number One Awards	1986	Homenaje a Benny More Vol. 3 (with Tito Puente)	Top Tropical /Salsa Latin Album	Nominated	
Billboard Number One Awards	1989	Ritmo en el Corazón (with Ray Barretto)	Top Tropical /Salsa Latin Album	Nominated	
Bilingual Foundation of the Arts	1995	Celia Cruz	El Angel Award	Honoree	
Casandra Awards (a.k.a. Soberano Awards)	1996	Celia Cruz	Soberano International	Honoree	
Chicago International Film Festival	1999	Celia Cruz	Career Achievement Award	Honoree	
Club Privado Hard's	1990	Celia Cruz	Special Award	Honoree	
Cuban Women's Club	1991	Celia Cruz	Floridiana Award	Honoree	
Desi Entertainment Awards	1992	Celia Cruz (The Mambo Kings)	Favorite Film Actress	Won	
Desi Entertainment Awards	1995	Celia Cruz	Desi Lifetime Achievement Award	Honoree	
Discometro (Mexico)	1967	Celia Cruz	Best-seller Tropical Artist	Won	
Discometro (Mexico)	1968	Celia Cruz	Best-seller Tropical Artist	Won	
Disco de Oro de Hollywood (Note: An award celebrated in Los Angeles, and organized by music producer Antonio de Marco and Alfredo Garcia according to La Opinión.)	1972	Celia Cruz	Ensemble of the Year	Nominated	
Disco de Oro de Hollywood	1973	Celia Cruz	Winning-Artists	Nominated	
El Heraldo de Mexico Awards	1967	Celia Cruz	Most Popular Foreign Singer	Won	
El Heraldo de Mexico Awards	1968	Celia Cruz	Most Popular Foreign Singer	Won	
Ellis Island Honors Society	1986	Celia Cruz	Mayor's Liberty Award	Honoree	
Fama magazine Award	2002	Celia Cruz	Lifetime Award	Honoree	
Festival Acapulco	1998	Celia Cruz	Special medal	Won	
Grammy Awards	1980	Eterno	Best Latin Recording	Nominated	
Grammy Awards	1984	Tremendo Trio	Best Tropical Latin Performance	Nominated	
Grammy Awards	1986	De Nuevo	Best Tropical Latin Performance	Nominated	
Grammy Awards	1987	Homenaje A Beny More - Vol. III	Best Tropical Latin Performance	Nominated	
Grammy Awards	1988	The Winners	Best Tropical Latin Performance	Nominated	
Grammy Awards	1990	Ritmo En El Corazon	Best Tropical Latin Performance	Won	
Grammy Awards	1993	Tributo A Ismael Rivera	Best Tropical Latin Performance	Nominated	
Grammy Awards	1994	Azúcar Negra	Best Tropical Latin Performance	Nominated	
Grammy Awards	1996	Irrepetible	Best Tropical Latin Performance	Nominated	
Grammy Awards	1998	"Guantanamera"	Best Rap Performance by a Duo or Group	Nominated	
Grammy Awards	1999	Mi Vida Es Cantar	Best Tropical Latin Performance	Nominated	
Grammy Awards	2001	Celia Cruz and Friends: A Night of Salsa	Best Salsa Album	Nominated	
Grammy Awards	2003	La Negra Tiene Tumbao	Best Salsa Album	Won	
Grammy Awards	2004	Regalo del Alma	Best Salsa/Merengue Album	Won	
Grammy Awards	2016	Celia Cruz	Lifetime Achievement Award	Honoree	
Hispanic	1995	Celia Cruz	Vida Awards	Honoree	
Hispanic Celebrities Award	2023	Celia Cruz	Lifetime Award	Honoree	
Hispanic Heritage Awards	1998	Celia Cruz	Lifetime Achievement Award	Honoree	
Imagen Awards	2003	Celia Cruz	Career Achievement Award	Honoree	
International Dance Music Awards	2004	"Ríe y Llora"	Best Latin Track	Won	
International Dance Music Awards	2005	"Son De La Loma"	Best Latin Track	Nominated	
Latin Achievement Awards	1973	Celia Cruz	Best Female Singer	Won	
Latin Grammy Awards	2000	Celia Cruz and Friends: A Night of Salsa	Best Salsa Performance	Won	
Latin Grammy Awards	2001	Siempre Viviré	Best Traditional Tropical Album	Won	
Latin Grammy Awards	2002	La Negra Tiene Tumbao	Best Salsa Album	Won	
Latin Grammy Awards	2002	La Negra Tiene Tumbao	Album of the Year	Nominated	
Latin Grammy Awards	2002	"La Negra Tiene Tumbao"	Best Music Video	Nominated	
Latin Grammy Awards	2002	"La Negra Tiene Tumbao"	Record of the Year	Nominated	
Latin Grammy Awards	2004	Regalo del Alma	Best Salsa Album	Won	
Lo Nuestro Awards	1990	Celia Cruz	Excellence Award	Honoree	
Lo Nuestro Awards	1994	Celia Cruz	Tropical Female Artist of the Year	Nominated	
Lo Nuestro Awards	1995	Celia Cruz	Tropical Female Artist of the Year	Nominated	
Lo Nuestro Awards	2001	Celia Cruz	Tropical Female Artist of the Year	Nominated	
Lo Nuestro Awards	2001	Celia Cruz and Friends: A Night of Salsa	Tropical Album of the Year	Nominated	
Lo Nuestro Awards	2003	La Negra Tiene Tumbao	Tropical Album of the Year	Won	
Lo Nuestro Awards	2003	"La Vida Es Un Carnaval"	Tropical Song of the Year	Won	
Lo Nuestro Awards	2003	"La Negra Tiene Tumbao"	Tropical Song of the Year	Nominated	
Lo Nuestro Awards	2003	Celia Cruz	Salsa Artist of the Year	Won	
Lo Nuestro Awards	2003	Celia Cruz	Tropical Female Artist of the Year	Won	
Lo Nuestro Awards	2004	Celia Cruz	Tropical Female Artist of the Year	Nominated	
Lo Nuestro Awards	2005	Celia Cruz	Tropical Female Artist of the Year	Won	
Lo Nuestro Awards	2025	"Celia" (with Gente de Zona)	Tropical Collaboration of the Year	Pending	
Musa de Oro Awards	1994	Celia Cruz	Lifetime Award	Honoree	
New York Latin Magazine Awards	1975	Celia Cruz	Female Vocalist of the Year	Won	
Nosotros Golden Eagle Award	1991	Celia Cruz	Lifetime Achievement in Music	Honoree	
Premios Aplauso '92	1989	Celia Cruz	Best Latin Female Vocalist	Won	
Premios Aplauso '92	1991	Celia Cruz	Best Latin Female Vocalist	Won	
Premios Aplauso '92	1992	Celia Cruz	Best Latin Female Vocalist	Won	
Premios Bravo	1988	Celia Cruz	Best Female Artist	Nominated	
Premios Bravo	1990	Celia Cruz	Tropical Female Artist	Won	
Premio Encuentro	1992	Celia Cruz	Arts and Entertainment (1992)	Honoree	
Premios Juventud	2004	"La Vida Es Un Carnaval"	Best Re-Mix	Nominated	
Premios Juventud	2004	"La Vida Es Un Carnaval"	Party Starter	Nominated	
Premios Juventud	2004	"La Negra Tiene Tumbao"	Party Starter	Nominated	
Premios Juventud	2004	Celia Cruz	My Idol Is	Nominated	
Premios de la Música (Spain)	2005	Dios disfrute a la reina	Best Traditional Music Album	Nominated	
Premios Tú Musica (Puerto Rico)	1984	Celia Cruz	Best Female Vocalist	Won	
Record World (International Latin Awards)	1972	Celia Cruz	Female Tropical Music Singer of the Year	Won	
Repertorio Español	2003	Celia Cruz	Best Latin Artist	Won	
Ritmo Latino Awards (Note: Also known as "Premio de la Gente" or Latin Music Fan Awards.)	2001	Celia Cruz	Tropical Artist, Male/Female	Nominated	
Ritmo Latino Awards	2002	Celia Cruz	Tropical Solo Artist or Group	Nominated	
Ritmo Latino Awards	2003	Celia Cruz	Gloria de la Música Award	Honoree	
Smithsonian Institution	1990	Celia Cruz	Lifetime Achievement Award	Honoree	
Smithsonian Institution	2001	Celia Cruz	James Smithson Bicentennial Medal	Honoree	
Telemundo	1999	Celia Cruz	Artist of the Millenium	Honoree	
The New York Daily News	1978	Celia Cruz	The News Music Poll Award for Best Latin Singer	Won	
The New York Daily News	1980	Celia Cruz	Best Latin Female Vocalist	Won	
The Recording Academy	1999	Celia Cruz	Heroes Award	Honoree	
Viña del Mar International Song Festival	2000	Celia Cruz	Gaviota de Plata (Silver Gull)	Silver	
Voices For Children Foundation	2003	Celia Cruz	Humanitarian Award	Honoree	

== Other honors ==
List of State/Government Honors
Year	Description	Status	Ref.
1981	Keys to the city, New York City from Mayor Ed Koch	Honoree	
1986	Medal of Liberty given by NYC Mayor Ed Koch	Honoree	
1990	Colombia's National Medal of Arts	Honoree	
1992	Hispanic Women Achievers Award from New York governor Mario Cuomo	Honoree	
1994	National Endowment for the Arts, given by U.S. President Bill Clinton	Honoree	
1996	Certificate of Appreciation by Los Angeles Cultural Affairs Office for her artistic work	Honoree	
1997	October 25 declared as Celia Cruz Day in San Francisco	Honoree	
1998	Condecoration "Cruz de Belalcázar" by Mayor of Cali, Colombia	Honoree	
1999	Condecoration by Colombian President, Andrés Pastrana Arango	Honoree	
2000	Keys to the City of West New York, New Jersey (Mayor Albio Sires)	Honoree	
2001	Keys to the City of Miami	Honoree	
2005	Congressional Gold Medal	Honoree	
2023	July 16 declared as "Celia Cruz Day" by NYC Mayor Eric Adams	Honoree	

List of Academic Honors
Year	Description	Status	Ref.
1989	Honorary Doctorate in Music from Yale University	Honoree	
1992	Honorary Doctorate from Florida International University	Honoree	
1993	Honorary Doctorate in Music from University of Florida	Honoree	
1994	Exito de Vida Award (Life Time Achievement Award) from University of Panama	Honoree	
1994	Medal from Cal Poly Pomona University	Honoree	
1999	Honorary Degree from University of Miami	Honoree	

List of cultural honors
Year	Description	Status	Ref.
1984	Queen of Miami carnival	Honoree	
1988	Grand Marshal of National Puerto Rican Day Parade	Honoree	
1995	Grand Marshal of New Jersey State Hispanic Parade	Honoree	
1995	Grand Marshal of Art Deco festival	Honoree	
2000	Queen of Viña del Mar International Song Festival	Honoree	

List of Walk of Fame/Hall of Fames
Walk of Fame	Year	Description	Status	Ref.
Hollywood Walk of Fame	1987	Walk of Star	Won	
Miami Calle 8 Walk of Fame	1991	Walk of Star	Won	
Movieland Hall of Fame (Note: Also known as The Hispanic Music and Entertainment Hall of Fame or Latin Hall of Fame section.)	1993	Hall of Fame inductee	Inducted	
Billboard Latin Music Hall of Fame	1994	Hall of Fame inductee	Inducted	
Venezuela Walk of Fame	1995	Walk of Star	Won	
Mexico's Plaza de las Estrellas	1997	Walk of Star	Won	
Costa Rica's Walk of Fame (Plaza Real Cariari)	1997	Hall of Fame inductee	Inducted	
International Latin Music Hall of Fame	1999	Hall of Fame inductee	Inducted	
Miami Beach Walk of Stars	2001	Walk of Star	Won	
Ritmo Latino	2003	Handprints Hall of Fame	Won	
People en Español Hall of Fame	2006	Hall of Fame inductee	Inducted	
New Jersey Hall of Fame	2013	Hall of Fame inductee	Inducted	
Apollo Theater Hall of Fame	2014	Hall of Fame inductee	Inducted	
Rock and Roll Hall of Fame	2026	Hall of Fame inductee	Inducted	
