= Ella Tiene Fuego =

Single by Celia Cruz featuring El General

from the album Regalo del Alma
- Released: 20 December 2003
- Recorded: February–March 2003
- Genre: Salsa, dancehall
- Length: 4:07
- Label: Sony Discos
- Songwriters: Sergio George, Edgardo Franco, Jorge Piloto
- Producer: Sergio George

Celia Cruz singles chronology
"Ríe y Llora" (2003)	"Ella Tiene Fuego" (2003)	"El Año Viejo" (2004)

"Ella Tiene Fuego" (English: "She Has Fire") is a song performed by Cuban recording artist Celia Cruz. It features Panamanian recording artist El General. The song was written by Sergio George and Fernando Osorio, produced by George and released as the second single from Cruz's final studio album Regalo del Alma (2003) on 20 December 2003.

The song peaked at number twenty-five on the Billboard Latin Songs chart and number two on the Billboard Tropical Songs chart. It later became the seventeenth best-performing tropical song of 2004.

== Background ==
In 2001, Cruz released her fifty-ninth album, La Negra Tiene Tumbao. The album featured a top ten single, in its title track as well as another relatively successful single, "Hay Que Empezar Otra Vez". "La Negra Tiene Tumbao" peaked at number thirty on the Billboard Latin Songs chart and number four on the Billboard Tropical Songs chart. It received nominations for Record of the Year, Song of the Year, and Music Video of the Year at the Latin Grammy Awards of 2002. The album won the Latin Grammy Award for Best Salsa Album. It was nominated for Album of the Year.

In December 2002, Cruz was sidelined by a brain tumor. In early 2003, following a partially successful surgery to remove the tumor, Cruz returned to the studio to record Regalo del Alma, weeks after the operation. Cruz later died on 16 July 2003 of brain cancer, at the age of 77.

"Rie y Llora" was released as the lead single from the album in July 2003. It was selected lead single for the album, "as it was the song in which she identified with." The song received an American Society of Composers, Authors and Publishers award for Tropical Song of the Year in 2004. At the Latin Grammy Awards of 2004, the song won the Latin Grammy Award for Best Tropical Song. At the ceremony, Regalo del Alma was awarded the Latin Grammy Award for Best Salsa Album. It also received the Grammy Award for Best Salsa/Merengue Album at the 46th Annual Grammy Awards. At the 2004 Latin Billboard Music Awards, the song received a nomination for "Tropical Airplay Track of the Year by a Female Artist".

== Musical composition and reception ==
The song combines tropical and rap musical genres. While reviewing the parent album, Allmusic's Evan Gutierrez claimed the song to be one of several "loop-driven tracks that propel Cruz and her loyal fan base into the 21st century." On Eduardo Marceles' biography of Cruz, Marceles considered the song to be "another rap theme". It received an American Society of Composers, Authors and Publishers award for Tropical Song of the Year in 2005.

== Track listing ==
No.	Title	Writer(s)	Producer(s)	Length
1.	"Ella Tiene Fuego" (Album Version)	Sergio George, Edgardo Franco, Jorge Piloto	Sergio George	4:07
Total length:				4:07

CD Single – The Remixes
No.	Title	Writer(s)	Producer(s)	Length
1.	"Ella Tiene Fuego" (D'Menace Reggaeton Radio Mix)	Sergio George, Edgardo Franco, Jorge Piloto	Dennis Nieves	3:53
2.	"Ella Tiene Fuego" (Giuseppe D. Radio Remix)	George, Franco, Piloto	Giuseppe D.	3:22
3.	"Ella Tiene Fuego" (Chris "The Greek" Panaghi Radio Mix)	George, Franco, Piloto	Chris Panaghi	3:45
4.	"Ella Tiene Fuego" (D'Menace Reggaeton Extended Mix)	George, Franco, Piloto	Dennis Nieves	5:09
5.	"Ella Tiene Fuego" (Giuseppe D. Extended Remix)	George, Franco, Piloto	Giuseppe D.	5:53
6.	"Ella Tiene Fuego" (Chris "The Greek" Panaghi Extended Mix)	George, Franco, Piloto	Chris Panaghi	6:42
7.	"Ella Tiene Fuego" (Album Version)	George, Franco, Piloto	Sergio George	4:07
Total length:				32:51

== Charts ==
=== Weekly charts ===
Chart (2004)	Peak
US Latin Songs (Billboard)	25
US Tropical Songs (Billboard)	2

=== Year-end charts ===
Chart (2004)	Position
US Tropical Songs (Billboard)	17
