= Ríe y Llora =

Single by Celia Cruz

from the album Regalo del Alma
- Released: 12 July 2003
- Recorded: February–March 2003
- Genre: Latin pop
- Length: 4:10
- Label: Sony Discos
- Songwriters: Sergio George, Fernando Osorio
- Producer: Sergio George

Celia Cruz singles chronology
"Pa Arriba No Va" (2002)	"Ríe y Llora" (2003)	"Ella Tiene Fuego" (2003)

"Ríe y Llora" (English: "Laugh and Cry") is a song performed by Cuban recording artist Celia Cruz. The song was written by Sergio George and Fernando Osorio, produced by George and released as the lead single from Cruz's final studio album Regalo del Alma (2003) on 12 July 2003. It was the final song recorded by Cruz, following being sidelined by a brain tumor and before her death on 16 July 2003.

The song peaked at number twelve on the Billboard Latin Songs chart and number nineteen on the Billboard Latin Pop Songs chart. It led the Billboard Tropical Songs chart for eleven weeks in 2003. It also managed to peak at number thirty-five on the Billboard Dance Club Songs chart.

== Background ==
In 2001, Cruz released her fifty-ninth album, La Negra Tiene Tumbao. The album featured a top ten single, in its title track as well as another relatively successful single, "Hay Que Empezar Otra Vez". "La Negra Tiene Tumbao" peaked at number thirty on the Billboard Latin Songs chart and number four on the Billboard Tropical Songs chart. It received nominations for Record of the Year, Song of the Year, and Music Video of the Year at the Latin Grammy Awards of 2002. The album won the Latin Grammy Award for Best Salsa Album. It was nominated for Album of the Year.

In December 2002, Cruz was sidelined by a brain tumor. In early 2003, following a partially successful surgery to remove the tumor, Cruz returned to the studio to record Regalo del Alma, weeks after the operation. Cruz later died on 16 July 2003 of brain cancer, at the age of 77. Cruz asked that the song be the lead single for the album, "as it was the song in which she identified with." "Ríe y Llora" was the final song recorded before her death.

== Musical composition ==
The song was composed in minor key tonality with joyful lyrics and catchy hooks. It features the use of a piano, brass horn ensemble and prominent percussion. It takes influence from Afro-Latin music. The song experiments in pop balladry, accompanied by the use of an electric guitar. According to a biography of Cruz, the song "is about laughing and crying. Cruz reminds her listeners to live their lives fully and enjoy every moment." Cuban writer Jose Quiroga claimed the song to be "an appeal to live for the moment, and to understand that forgiveness is not forgetting, but rather the possibility of remembering without pain." He opined that the song was appropriately titled. The song is sequel to the songwriter's previous collaboration on Cruz's "La Negra Tiene Tumbao". The label wanted a new "La Negra Tiene Tumbao".

== Critical reception ==
The song received an American Society of Composers, Authors and Publishers award for Tropical Song of the Year. At the Latin Grammy Awards of 2004, the song won the Latin Grammy Award for Best Tropical Song. At the ceremony, Regalo del Alma was awarded the Latin Grammy Award for Best Salsa Album. It also received the Grammy Award for Best Salsa/Merengue Album at the 46th Annual Grammy Awards. At the 2004 Latin Billboard Music Awards, the song received a nomination for "Tropical Airplay Track of the Year by a Female Artist". "Rie y Llora" was awarded Best Latin Dance Song at the 19th Annual International Dance Music Awards. It is considered one of Cruz's most significant songs. According to the Spanish-language newspaper, El Pais, the song helped relieve the "nostalgia" caused by Cruz's death. The song was covered by Raul Bier and Pablo Delvillar on the tribute album Tributo a Celia Cruz: Bachata Con Azúcar (2003), by Maruja on her debut studio album Azúcar! (2005),

== Track listing ==
No.	Title	Writer(s)	Producer(s)	Length
1.	"Ríe y Llora" (Album Version)	Sergio George, Fernando Osorio	Sergio George	4:10
Total length:				4:10

US CD Single – The Remixes
No.	Title	Writer(s)	Producer(s)	Length
1.	"Ríe y Llora" (Que Viva la Reina Extended Mix)	Sergio George, Fernando Osorio	Oba Frank Lords	7:35
2.	"Ríe y Llora" (Que Viva la Reina Dub Mix)	George, Osorio	Oba Frank Lords	8:42
3.	"Ríe y Llora" (D'Motion Brothers Azuca' Forever Extended Remix)	George, Osorio	Rene Zayas, DJ Leony	6:25
4.	"Ríe y Llora" (DJ Fluid Extended Mix)	George, Osorio	DJ Fluid	6:19
5.	"Ríe y Llora" (Album Version)	George, Osorio	Sergio George	4:10
Total length:				33:11

Mexico CD Single – The Remixes
No.	Title	Writer(s)	Producer(s)	Length
1.	"Ríe y Llora" (Que Viva la Reina Radio Mix)	Sergio George, Fernando Osorio	Oba Frank Lords	4:29
2.	"Ríe y Llora" (Que Viva la Reina Extended Mix)	George, Osorio	Oba Frank Lords	7:35
3.	"Ríe y Llora" (Que Viva la Reina Dub Mix)	George, Osorio	Oba Frank Lords	8:42
4.	"Ríe y Llora" (D'Motion Brothers Azuca' Forever Radio Remix)	George, Osorio	Rene Zayas, DJ Leony	4:55
5.	"Ríe y Llora" (D'Motion Brothers Azuca' Forever Extended Remix)	George, Osorio	Rene Zayas, DJ Leony	6:25
6.	"Ríe y Llora" (DJ Fluid Radio Remix)	George, Osorio	DJ Fluid	3:51
7.	"Ríe y Llora" (DJ Fluid Extended Mix)	George, Osorio	DJ Fluid	6:19
8.	"Ríe y Llora" (Album Version)	George, Osorio	Sergio George	4:10
Total length:				46:26

== Charts ==
=== Weekly charts ===
Chart (2003)	Peak
US Latin Songs (Billboard)	12
US Latin Pop Songs (Billboard)	19
US Tropical Songs (Billboard)	1
US Dance Mix Show Songs (Billboard)	8
US Dance Club Songs (Billboard)	35

Chart (2012)	Peak
US Tropical Digital Songs (Billboard)	24

=== Year-end charts ===
Chart (2003)	Rank
US Tropical Songs (Billboard)	11

=== All time charts ===
Chart (All time)	Rank
US Tropical Songs (Billboard)	18

== See also ==
- List of number-one Billboard Hot Tropical Songs of 2003
