= Regalo del Alma =

Studio album by Celia Cruz
- Released: 29 July 2003
- Recorded: February–March 2003
- Genres: Salsa; Latin pop
- Length: 46:35
- Label: Sony Discos
- Producers: Sergio George; Oscar Gómez

Celia Cruz chronology
Hits Mix (2002)	Regalo del Alma (2003)

Singles from Regalo del Alma
- 1. "Ríe y Llora" Released: 12 July 2003; 2. "Ella Tiene Fuego" Released: 20 December 2003

Regalo del Alma (English: A Gift from the Soul) is a studio album recorded by Cuban salsa recording artist Celia Cruz, released posthumously on 29 July 2003 by Sony Music Latin, following her death on July 16, 2003. It was Cruz's seventieth and final album.

The album spawned two singles, "Ríe y Llora" and "Ella Tiene Fuego". The former peaked at number twelve on the Billboard Latin Songs chart and number nineteen on the Billboard Latin Pop Songs chart. It led the Billboard Tropical Songs chart for eleven weeks in 2003. The latter reached number twenty-five and number two on the Latin Song and Tropical Songs charts, respectively.

Selling 24,000 copies in its first week, the recording peaked at number forty on the Billboard 200 and number one on both the Billboard Latin Albums and Billboard Tropical Albums charts. Regalo del Alma was awarded the Latin Grammy Award for Best Salsa Album. It also received the Grammy Award for Best Salsa/Merengue Album at the 46th Annual Grammy Awards.

== Background ==
In 2001, Cruz released her fifty-ninth album, La Negra Tiene Tumbao. The album featured a top ten single, in its title track as well as two relatively successful singles, "Hay Que Empezar Otra Vez" and "Pa' Arriba No Va". "La Negra Tiene Tumbao" peaked at number thirty on the Billboard Latin Songs chart and number four on the Billboard Tropical Songs chart. "Hay Que Empezar Otra Vez" peaked at number sixteen on the Billboard Tropical Songs chart. The former received nominations for Record of the Year, Song of the Year, and Music Video of the Year at the Latin Grammy Awards of 2002. The album won the Latin Grammy Award for Best Salsa Album. It was nominated for Album of the Year. The album peaked at number five and number two on the Billboard Latin Albums and Billboard Tropical Albums charts, respectively. It also managed to peak at number thirty-eight on the Billboard Heatseeker Albums chart. In November 2002, a compilation album entitled Hits Mix was released. The album eventually went on to peak at number two on the Billboard Latin Albums, and number one on the Billboard Tropical Albums chart. It also peaked at number 106 on the Billboard 200.

== Recording and production ==
Following a presentation in Mexico in 2002, Cruz began to show signs of her failing health. Cruz was to begin recording in December 2002, however that month, Cruz was sidelined by a brain tumor. In early 2003, following a partially successful surgery to remove the tumor, Cruz returned to the studio to record Regalo del Alma, weeks after the operation. While recording the album, Cruz knew "she was gonna die at any moment, any month," according to producer Sergio George. George claimed the album to be an emotional and bizarre project to work on. He cited Cruz's "will to win and to fight to get this record done" as being something he would cherish for the rest of his life, calling the album his great achievement. "Ríe y Llora" was the final song recorded before her death. Cruz asked that the song be the lead single for the album, "as it was the song in which she identified with." Cruz later died on 16 July 2003 of brain cancer, at the age of 77.

== Musical composition ==
"Ella Tiene Fuego" ("She Has Fire") combines tropical and rap musical genres. On Eduardo Marceles' biography of Cruz, Marceles considered the song to be "another rap theme". The second track, "José Caridad", was composed in minor key tonality. It features the use of a piano, a brass horn ensemble, prominent percussion and mallet percussion. The song also uses acoustic instrumentation. The song also makes use of vocal call and response.

Celia Cruz "Rie y Llora" (2003)
A 24 second sample of the lead single from the album, "Rie y Llora".

"Ríe y Llora" ("Laugh and Cry") was composed in minor key tonality with joyful lyrics and catchy hooks. It features the use of a piano, brass horn ensemble and prominent percussion. It takes influence from Afro-Latin music. The song experiments in pop balladry, accompanied by the use of an electric guitar. According to a biography of Cruz, the song "is about laughing and crying. Cruz reminds her listeners to live their lives fully and enjoy every moment." Cuban writer Jose Quiroga claimed the song to be "an appeal to live for the moment, and to understand that forgiveness is not forgetting, but rather the possibility of remembering without pain." He opined that the song was appropriately titled.

"Pa' La Cola" was composed in major key tonality. It features Caribbean roots, taking influences from Afro-Latin American and Caribbean musical styles. "María la Loca" ("María, the Crazy One") was composed in minor key tonality. Lyrically, the song speaks of love and heartbreak. It experiments in acoustic balladry. "Yo Vivire (I Will Survive)" was originally performed by American singer Gloria Gaynor. It was written by Freddie Perren and Dino Fekaris. Cruz originally covered the song in Spanish on her 2000 album, Siempre Vivire (I Will Always Live).

== Release and promotion ==
The album marked Cruz's seventieth album. The album was originally released on 29 July 2003. It was rereleased on 5 August 2003, by Sony Music. In February 2003, the Spanish-language television network Telemundo announced that it would produce and air a tribute concert honoring Cruz, entitled ¡Celia Cruz: Azúcar!. It was hosted by American singer Marc Anthony and Cuban-American singer Gloria Estefan. It featured musical performances by various Latin music and Anglo performers including American singer Victor Manuelle, Mexican singer Paulina Rubio, Puerto Rican singer José Feliciano, Dominican singer Milly Quezada, Colombian group Los Tri-O, Estefan, American singer Patti LaBelle, Cuban musician Arturo Sandoval, Mexican singer Ana Gabriel, Puerto Rican singer Gilberto Santa Rosa, Puerto Rican singer Tito Nieves, Cuban singer Albita, Dominican singer Johnny Pacheco, Mexican singer Alicia Villareal, Puerto Rican singer Olga Tañón, Puerto Rican singer Mikey Perfecto, Dominican singer José Alberto "El Canario", Puerto Rican singer Rosario, Nicaraguan Luis Enrique, Anthony and American Gloria Gaynor. The tribute special aired in March 2003. It raised $145,000 for the Celia Cruz Foundation. This was Cruz's final public appearance. On 27 January 2004, the concert was released on DVD.

== Commercial performance ==
Upon release, the album sold 24,000 copies in its first week. Copies of the album soon sold out, following its release. For the week of 9 August 2003, the album debuted at number fifty-one on the Billboard Latin Albums chart, and number five on the Billboard Tropical Albums chart. The following week, the album rose to number one on both charts, debuting at number forty on the Billboard 200. It led the Latin Albums chart for three weeks, being succeeded by Nuestro Destino Estaba Escrito by Intocable, for the week of 6 September 2003. The album led the Tropical Albums chart for five weeks, being succeeded by Cruz's Exitos Eternos for the week of 20 September 2003. Exitos Eternos led the chart for three weeks before being dislodged by Regalo Del Alma for the week of 11 October 2003. Exitos Eternos returned to the top, the following week of 18 October 2003, while Regalo Del Alma reclaimed the top spot for the following week of 25 October 2003. The following week, Exitos Eternos reclaimed the top spot.

== Critical reception ==
Professional ratings
Review scores
Source	Rating
Allmusic	4.5/5 stars
Billboard	(favorable)
Chicago Tribune	(favorable)
El Tiempo	4/4 stars

Allmusic's Evan Gutierrez gave the album four and a half stars out of five stars. He praised the album for "keeping with the exuberant, joyful tone" of Cruz and for its freshness that made the project invigorating. Gutierrez claimed the album to have modern stylistic influences and production. For this reason, he claimed the production to sometimes "mask the subtle richness of Celia's vocal performance." He felt that older Cruz fans might not favor the album. He cited "Ella Tiene Fuego" and "La Nina de la Trenza Negra" to be "loop-driven tracks that propel Cruz and her loyal fan base into the 21st century." Gutierrez called "Yo Vivire" "a creative rendition of the disco classic "I Will Survive." He referred to it being "like a declaration from beyond" with "chilling lyrics and a gorgeous arrangement." Leila Cobo of Billboard magazine felt that the album was recorded in "typical Cruz manner: quickly and from the heart." The Chicago Tribune's Achy Obejas gave the album a favorable review. He called a "measured finale". He compared "Ella Tiene Fuego" to Cruz's 2001 single "La Vida Es Un Carnaval" and "La Nina de la Trenza Negra" to "La Negra Tiene Tumbao". He claimed the album to deliver "power pop, hardcore salsa and Cuban soul". He called "Yo Vivire" "over the top", also labeling it "testimony," because according to him, "for all her modesty, even she [Cruz] knew she was timeless."

== Accolades and legacy ==
"Ríe y Llora" received an American Society of Composers, Authors and Publishers award for Tropical Song of the Year. At the Latin Grammy Awards of 2004, the song won the Latin Grammy Award for Best Tropical Song. It is considered one of Cruz's most significant songs. According to the Spanish-language newspaper, El Pais, the song helped relieve the "nostalgia" caused by Cruz's death. The Spanish-language newspaper El Heraldo, included the song on its list of ten songs that "immortalized Cruz". "Ella Tiene Fuego" also received an American Society of Composers, Authors and Publishers award for Tropical Song of the Year in 2005. At the Latin Grammy Award ceremony, Regalo del Alma was awarded the Latin Grammy Award for Best Salsa Album. It also received the Grammy Award for Best Salsa/Merengue Album at the 46th Annual Grammy Awards. The Spanish-language newspaper La Nación claimed "Ríe y Llora" and "Yo Vivire" to be two of Cruz's most "tasty" videos. At the 2004 Latin Billboard Music Awards, Regalo Del Alma was awarded Tropical Album of the Year in the female category. Cobo predicted that the album should and would win the award. She also won the Greatest Hits Album of the Year for Hits Mix (2002), also becoming the Top Latin Albums Artist of the Year. In the Tropical Album of the Year female category, Cruz was also nominated with Exitos Eternos (2003) and Hits Mix. In the Greatest Hits Album of the Year category, Cruz was also nominated for Exitos Eternos.

== Track listing ==
No.	Title	Writer(s)	Length
1.	"Ella Tiene Fuego"	Sergio George · Edgardo Franco · Jorge Piloto	04:08
2.	"José Caridad"	Gradelio Pérez · Alain Pérez	04:00
3.	"Ríe y Llora"	George · Fernando Osorio	04:11
4.	"Ay, Pena, Penita"	León Quiroga · Rafael de Leon · Miguel Lopez	04:59
5.	"Diagnóstico"	Marisela Verena	04:29
6.	"La Niña De La Trenza Negra"	Pérez · Pérez	04:11
7.	"Me Huele A Rumba"	Chery Jimenez	04:05
8.	"No Estés Amargao"	Rafael Ray	04:04
9.	"Pa' La Cola"	George · Manny Benito	04:05
10.	"María La Loca"	Luca Germini · José Suárez · Yrvis Mendez	04:02
11.	"Yo Viviré (I Will Survive)"	Dino Fekaris · Freddie Perren · Oscar Gomez	04:32

=== Notes ===
- The tracks "Ella Tiene Fuego", "Ríe y Llora", "Diagnóstico", "Me Huele a Rumba", "Pa' La Cola", and "Yo Viviré (I Will Survive)" were produced by Sergio George.
- The tracks "José Caridad", "Ay, Pena, Penita", "La Niña de la Trenza Negra", "No Estés Amargao", and "María la Loca" were produced by Oscar Gómez.

== Personnel ==
This information is adapted from Allmusic.

Production

- Sergio George — Piano, arranger, keyboards, producer, bass, drum programming
- Angel Carrasco — Executive producer
- Bob Brockman — Mixing
- Mike Fuller — Mastering
- Jake R. Tanner — Engineer
- Luca Germini — Engineer
- Jon Fausty — Engineer, mixing
- Jorge Gómez — Sound technician, mixing
- Oscar Gómez — Adaptation, digital producer, vocals, realization, mixing
- Ivan "Melón" González — Piano
- Carlos Laurenz — Engineer, sound technician, mixing
- José López — Sound technician
- Olga Santos — Sound technician
- Susana Ensin Tarriño — Production coordination
- Maite Palencia — Production coordination
- Adolfo Pérez Butrón — Photography
- Mario Houben — Graphic design
- Rudy Sanchez — Hair

Musicians

- Yrvis Méndez — Acoustic guitar, arranger, electric guitar, keyboards, programming, bass, vocals
- Jose "Majito" Aguilera — percussion, bongos, timbales, bata, cajón, tumbadora, vocals
- Alain Pérez — Arranger, keyboards, tres, bass, vocals
- Bernd Schoenhart — Acoustic guitar, electric guitar
- Juan Cerro — Spanish guitar
- Juan Munguía — Trumpet
- Marc Quiñones — Percussion
- Luis Quintero — Percussion
- Cherito — Vocals
- Celía Cruz — Vocals
- William Duvall — Vocals
- Rubén Rodríguez — Bass
- Julio Barreto — Vocals
- Axé Bahia — Guest appearance
- El General — Rap

== Charts ==
=== Weekly charts ===
Chart (2003)	Peak Position
US Billboard 200	40
US Latin Albums (Billboard)	1
US Tropical Albums (Billboard)	1

=== Year-end charts ===
Chart (2003)	Position
US Latin Albums (Billboard)	10
US Tropical Albums (Billboard)	2

== Release history ==
Region	Date	Format	Label
Germany	18 August 2003	CD · digital download	Sony Discos
France	25 August 2003	CD · digital download	Sony Discos
Italy	25 August 2003	CD · digital download	Sony Discos
Spain	18 September 2003	CD · digital download	Columbia Records
United Kingdom	15 June 2009	Digital download	Sony Discos
United States	29 July 2003	CD · digital download	Sony Discos
United States	7 March 2025	LP	Sony Discos

== Sales and certifications ==
Region	Certification	Certified units/sales
United States (RIAA)	2× Platinum (Latin)	200,000^{^}
^{^} Shipments figures based on certification alone.

== See also ==
- List of number-one Billboard Top Latin Albums of 2003
- List of number-one Billboard Tropical Albums from the 2000s
