= ¡Celia Cruz: Azúcar! =

- Created by: Telemundo
- Presented by: Marc Anthony; Gloria Estefan
- Starring: Celia Cruz
- Country of origin: United States
- Original language: Spanish

Production
- Production locations: Miami Beach Convention Center, Miami
- Running time: 109 minutes

Original release
- Network: Telemundo
- Release: 13 March 2003

¡Celia Cruz: Azúcar! (English: Celia Cruz: Sugar!) was a tribute special held in honor of Cuban performer Celia Cruz. It was hosted by American singer Marc Anthony and Cuban-American singer Gloria Estefan. It featured musical performances by various Latin music and Anglo performers including Victor Manuelle, Paulina Rubio, José Feliciano, Milly Quezada, Los Tri-O, Gloria Estefan, Patti LaBelle, Arturo Sandoval, Ana Gabriel, Gilberto Santa Rosa, Tito Nieves, Albita, Johnny Pacheco, Alfredo de la Fe, Alicia Villareal, Olga Tañón, Mikey Perfecto, José Alberto "El Canario", Rosario, Luis Enrique, Marc Anthony and Gloria Gaynor. This was Cruz's final public appearance, before her death in July 2003. The tribute concert raised $145,000 for the Celia Cruz Foundation.

- Musicians: Luis Aquino, Ito Torres, Vicente "Cussi" Castillo, Juan Quinones, Rafy Torres, Victor Vazquez, Tonito Vazquez, William "Cachiro" Thompson, Tito De Gracia, Ceferino Caban, Cucco Pena.

== Background ==
In December 2002, Cruz was sidelined by a brain tumor. In early 2003, following a partially successful surgery to remove the tumor, Cruz returned to the studio to record her seventieth album, Regalo del Alma, weeks after the operation.

In February 2003, the Spanish-language television network Telemundo announced that it would produce and air a tribute concert honoring Cruz. The tribute special aired in March 2003. Cruz later died on 16 July 2003 of brain cancer, at the age of 77.

== Setlist ==
Setlist as follows:

1. Opening (Homenaje a Celia Cruz) – 02:01
2. "La Vida Es Un Carnaval" – Victor Manuelle – 06:28
3. "La Candela" – Paulina Rubio – 04:46
4. "Usted Abusó" - José Feliciano - 03:55
5. "Isadora Duncan" – Milly Quezada – 04:31
6. "Dile Que Por Mí No Tema" – Los Tri-O – 02:26
7. "Quimbara" – Gloria Estefan, Patti LaBelle, Arturo Sandoval – 04:14
8. "Tu Voz" – Ana Gabriel – 03:38
9. "Bemba Colorá" – Gilberto Santa Rosa – 06:17
10. "Guantanamera" – Tito Nieves, Albita, Johnny Pacheco, Alfredo de la Fe – 05:36
11. "Vieja Luna" – Alicia Villareal – 02:09
12. "La Negra Tiene Tumbao" - Olga Tañón, Mikey Perfecto — 04:27
13. Popurri ("Cúcala"/"Caramelos"/"Burundanga"/"Castellano") – José Alberto "El Canario", La India, Rosario, Luis Enrique – 10:44
14. "Yerbero Moderno" – Marc Anthony – 03:41
15. I Will Survive – Gloria Gaynor – 02:10
16. "Yo Viviré"/"Quimbara" (Encore) – Celia Cruz, Victor Manuelle, Paulina Rubio, José Feliciano, Milly Quezada, Los Tri-O, Gloria Estefan, Patti LaBelle, Arturo Sandoval, Alfredo de la Fe, Ana Gabriel, Gilberto Santa Rosa, Tito Nieves, Albita, Johnny Pacheco, Alicia Villareal, Olga Tañón, Mikey Perfecto, José Alberto "El Canario", Rosario, Luis Enrique, Marc Anthony, Gloria Gaynor – 11:42

== DVD release ==
On 27 January 2004, the concert was released on DVD. In 2010, the Celia Cruz Estate sued Telemundo, claiming the network to not have properly paid the estate for DVD, which resulted in profits exceeding one million dollars. The suit claimed that "Cruz’ appearance would be considered a work for hire. But the suit alleges that contractually, Telemundo had also agreed to pay a donation to Cruz’ charity and that Cruz would be compensated for "any revenue from any ancillary source related to the Tribute, including later post-production and distribution."
