= Hits Mix =

Remix album by Celia Cruz
- Released: 5 November 2002
- Genre: Dance · Latin pop
- Length: 41:47
- Label: Sony Discos
- Producer: Sergio George

Celia Cruz chronology
La Negra Tiene Tumbao (2001)	Hits Mix (2002)	Regalo del Alma (2003)

Singles from Hits Mix
- 1. "Gotta Get Down" Released: November 2002; 2. "Yo Vivire (I Will Survive)" Released: 2003

Hits Mix is the first remix album by Cuban recording artist Celia Cruz. It featured two singles, a Spanglish remix version of "La Negra Tiene Tumbao", entitled "Gotta Get Down" and a dance remix of "Yo Vivire (I Will Survive)".

Upon release, the album peaked at number 106 on the Billboard 200, number two on the Billboard Latin Albums chart, and number one on the Billboard Tropical Albums chart. It became the best-selling Tropical album of 2003. It was also the ninth best-selling Latin album of 2003.

== Recording and production ==
Producer Sergio George was hired to produce more traditional tracks for Cruz's fifty-ninth album, La Negra Tiene Tumbao (2001). However, George wanted to try something different. According to George, he played a demo version of "La Negra Tiene Tumbao" for Cruz, "not knowing how she would respond, and that was the song that she most reacted to". "La Negra Tiene Tumbao" was the last song completed for the album.

== Musical composition ==
The original version of "La Negra Tiene Tumbao" combines elements of salsa music, reggae music and hip hop music. The song's title translates to "The Black Woman has Style" or "The Black Woman has Attitude". The song was composed in minor key and incorporates the use of vocal call and response.

"Yo Vivire (I Will Survive)" was originally performed by American singer Gloria Gaynor. It was written by Freddie Perren and Dino Fekaris. Cruz originally covered the song in Spanish on her 2000 album, Siempre Vivire (I Will Always Live).

== Critical reception ==
Professional ratings
Review scores
Source	Rating
Allmusic	3/5 stars

An editor for Allmusic gave the album three out of five stars, insisting that the album contains "pumped-up remixes of favorites from previous releases." The reviewer claimed that Cruz alternates from "swooping, but not showy, melodic moves to rhythmic rapid-fire pronouncements" on the release. According to the reviewer, "Cruz starts what feels like a dance party headed towards the wee hours."

At the 2004 Latin Billboard Music Awards, the album was awarded the Greatest Hits Album of the Year Award. In the same category, Cruz was also nominated for Exitos Eternos (2003). Her 2004 album Regalo del Alma was awarded Tropical Album of the Year in the female category. Cobo predicted that the album should and would win the award. In the same category, Cruz was also nominated with Exitos Eternos and Hits Mix, also becoming the Top Latin Albums Artist of the Year.

== Track listing ==
No.	Title	Writer(s)	Length
1.	"La Negra Tiene Tumbao" (DJ Fluid Remix)	Sergio George · Fernando Osorio	03:50
2.	"La Sopa" (Remix)	Emilio Estefan · Rafeal Ortiz	03:40
3.	"Yo Vivire (I Will Survive)" (Azucar Para Ti Remix)	Dino Fekaris · Freddie Perren · Oscar Gomez	04:20
4.	"La Vida Es Un Carnaval" (Reggae Latino Mix)	Victor Daniel	04:42
5.	"Que Le Den Candela" (Dance Mix)	Jorge Piloto	04:30
6.	"Hay Que Empezar Otra Vez" (Reggae Latino Mix)	Daniel	04:25
7.	"Oye Como Va" (Latin Trance Mix)	Tito Puente	04:18
8.	"Azúcar Negra" (Sarli's Azúcar Negra Remix)	Mario Diaz	03:35
9.	"Sazón" (Sarli's Sazón Remix)	Estefan · Gloria Estefan	04:32
10.	"Gotta Get Down (La Negra Tiene Tumbao)" (Spanglish Remix)	George · Osorio	03:48

== Charts ==
=== Weekly charts ===
Chart (2003)	Peak Position
US Billboard 200	106
US Latin Albums (Billboard)	2
US Tropical Albums (Billboard)	1

=== Year-end charts ===
Chart (2003)	Position
US Latin Albums (Billboard)	9
US Tropical Albums (Billboard)	1

== Sales and certifications ==
Region	Certification	Certified units/sales
United States (RIAA)	2× Platinum (Latin)	200,000^{^}
^{^} Shipments figures based on certification alone.

== See also ==
- List of number-one Billboard Tropical Albums from the 2000s
