= List of number-one Billboard Hot Tropical Songs of 2003 =

The Billboard Tropical Songs chart is a music chart that ranks the best-performing tropical songs of the United States. Published by Billboard magazine, the data are compiled by Nielsen Broadcast Data Systems based on each single's weekly airplay.

== Chart history ==
Issue date	Song	Artist	Ref
January 4	"En nombre de los dos"	Víctor Manuelle	
January 11	"En nombre de los dos"	Víctor Manuelle	
January 18	"En nombre de los dos"	Víctor Manuelle	
January 25	"Sedúceme"	India	
February 1	"Sedúceme"	India	
February 8	"Sedúceme"	India	
February 15	"Sedúceme"	India	
February 22	"Sedúceme"	India	
March 1	"Sedúceme"	India	
March 8	"Sedúceme"	India	
March 15	"Sedúceme"	India	
March 22	"Sedúceme"	India	
March 29	"Sedúceme"	India	
April 5	"Sedúceme"	India	
April 12	"Sedúceme"	India	
April 19	"El tonto que no te olvidó"	Víctor Manuelle	
April 26	"El tonto que no te olvidó"	Víctor Manuelle	
May 3	"El tonto que no te olvidó"	Víctor Manuelle	
May 10	"El tonto que no te olvidó"	Víctor Manuelle	
May 17	"El tonto que no te olvidó"	Víctor Manuelle	
May 24	"Si te dijeron"	Gilberto Santa Rosa	
May 31	"Para qué la vida"	Enrique Iglesias	
June 7	"Tal Vez"	Ricky Martin	
June 14	"El tonto que no te olvidó"	Víctor Manuelle	
June 21	"Se nos perdió el amor"	El Gran Combo de Puerto Rico	
June 28	"Traición"	India	
July 5	"Si te dijeron"	Gilberto Santa Rosa	
July 12	"Si te dijeron"	Gilberto Santa Rosa	
July 19	"Si te dijeron"	Gilberto Santa Rosa	
July 26	"Lloraré las penas"	David Bisbal	
August 2	"Ríe y Llora"	Celia Cruz	
August 9	"Ríe y Llora"	Celia Cruz	
August 16	"Ríe y Llora"	Celia Cruz	
August 23	"Ríe y Llora"	Celia Cruz	
August 30	"Ríe y Llora"	Celia Cruz	
September 6	"Ríe y Llora"	Celia Cruz	
September 13	"Ríe y Llora"	Celia Cruz	
September 20	"Ríe y Llora"	Celia Cruz	
September 27	"Ríe y Llora"	Celia Cruz	
October 4	"Hoy"	Gloria Estefan	
October 11	"Ríe y llora"	Celia Cruz	
October 18	"Ríe y llora"	Celia Cruz	
October 25	"Hoy"	Gloria Estefan	
November 1	"Hoy"	Gloria Estefan	
November 8	"Antes"	Obie Bermúdez	
November 15	"Mi libertad"	Jerry Rivera	
November 22	"Mi libertad"	Jerry Rivera	
November 29	"Mi libertad"	Jerry Rivera	
December 6	"Mi libertad"	Jerry Rivera	
December 13	"Mi libertad"	Jerry Rivera	
December 20	"Mi libertad"	Jerry Rivera	
December 27	"Me cansé de ti"	Obie Bermúdez	

== See also ==
- List of number-one Billboard Hot Tropical Songs of 2004
- List of number-one Billboard Hot Latin Tracks of 2003
- List of number-one Billboard Hot Latin Pop Airplay of 2003
