= Grammy Award for Best Salsa Album =

Music award category

The Grammy Award for Best Salsa Album was awarded from 2000 to 2003. In its first year the award was titled Best Salsa Performance. In 2004 this award was combined with the award for Best Merengue Album as the Grammy Award for Best Salsa/Merengue Album.

Years reflect the year in which the Grammy Awards were presented, for works released in the previous year.

== Recipients ==
Year	Winner	Nominations	references
2003	La Negra Tiene Tumbao by Celia Cruz	Un Nuevo Amanecer by Anthony Cruz; Tremanda Rumba! by Maraca; Libre by Marc Anthony; Un Gran Día en el Barrio by Spanish Harlem Orchestra	
2002	Encore by Roberto Blades	Por Tu Placer by Frankie Negrón; Intenso by Gilberto Santa Rosa; Doble Play by Oscar D'León and Wladimir; En Otra Onda by Tito Nieves	
2001	Masterpiece/Obra Maestra by Tito Puente and Eddie Palmieri	Celia Cruz and Friends: A Night of Salsa by Celia Cruz; Evolución by Luis Enrique; Son By Four by Son By Four; Hablando del Amor by Tony Vega	
2000	Llego... Van Van - Van Van is Here by Los Van Van	Gotcha! by Dark Latin Groove; Sola by India; De Otra Manera by Jerry Rivera; La Formula Original by Oscar D'León	

== See also ==
- Grammy Award for Best Merengue Album
- Grammy Award for Best Salsa/Merengue Album
- Grammy Award for Best Tropical Latin Album
- Latin Grammy Award for Best Salsa Album
