= Chris Panaghi =

American DJ, producer and remixer

Chris "The Greek" Panaghi
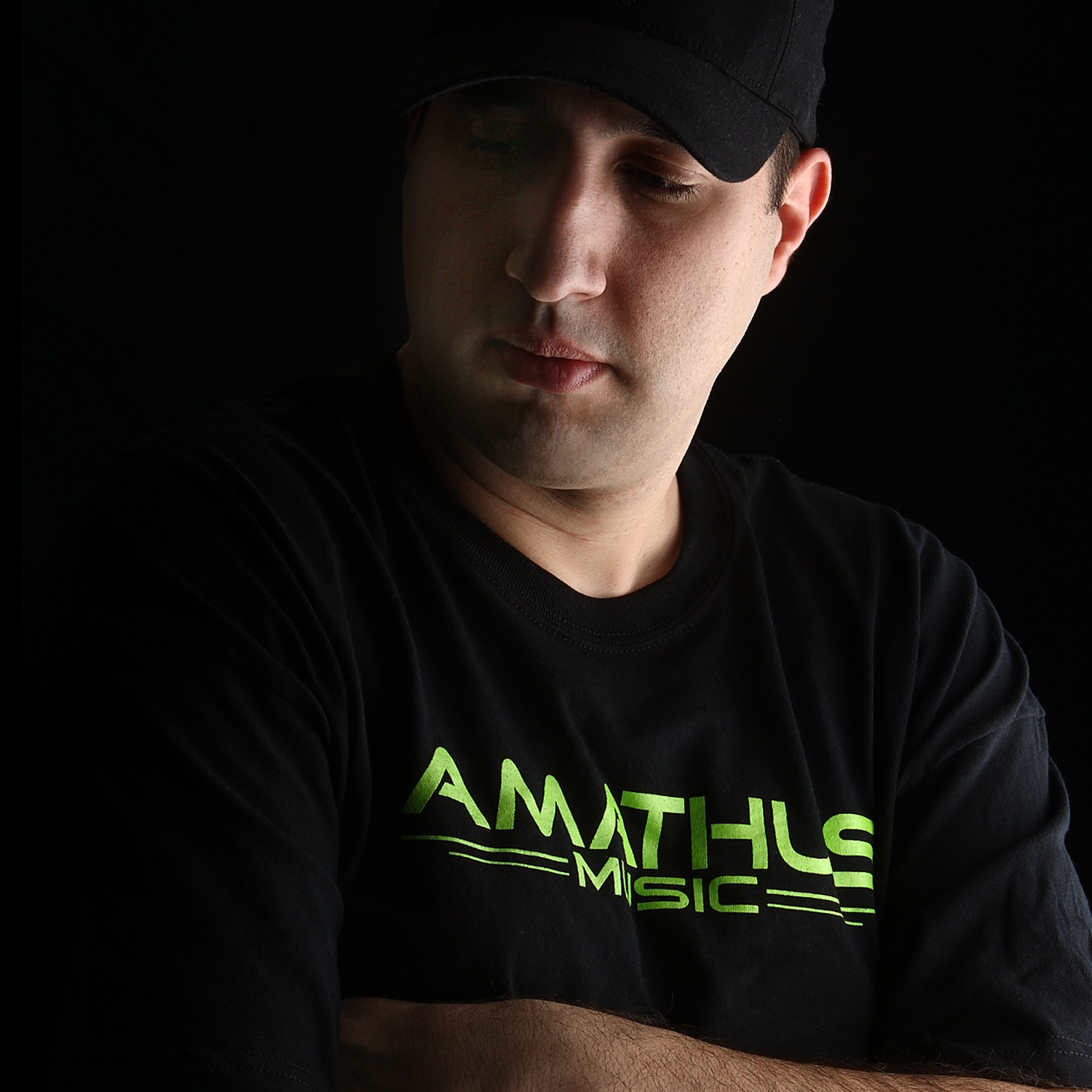

Background information
- Birth name: Chris Panaghi
- Also known as: CP Project, CTGP, DJ Greek, DJG
- Born: November 3, 1972 (age 52); Valley Stream. Long Island, New York, United States
- Genres: Electronic Music, dance, trance & house
- Occupation(s): Producer, Remixer and Recording Artist
- Years active: 1990 to present
- Labels: Various including Amathus Music, DJG Records & Tommy Boy Records
- Website: www.christhegreek.com, www.djgproductions.com

Chris "The Greek" Panaghi is an American DJ, producer and remixer based in Long Island, New York, United States. He performs in the electronic music genre with remixes spanning electronic dance, trance and house music and has remixed for artists including: Michael Jackson, Gloria Estefan, Celine Dion, Jessica Simpson, Celia Cruz, Jon Secada, Marc Anthony, Aqua and Yoko Ono. His studio work has been described as incorporating "True-to-the-vocal, pop-oriented remixes and harder, progressive house tracks".

Panaghi has principally performed in the United States, but has also developed a fan base in Europe, principally in France, Germany, Greece, Netherlands and the UK.

== Early career ==
Chris Panaghi's career began in high school at the age of 15, when he started experimenting with record turntables. Within a couple of years he had begun to perform as a mobile DJ and in local bars in his hometown of Valley Stream, Long Island. By the time he was 18 he had progressed to performing in local clubs, such as Malibu, J. Sprats, Metro 700, DNA and Zachary's. He later began playing clubs in the New York Tri-state area, including Manhattan and Queens before travelling further in the U.S. (South Beach, Miami) and internationally (Greece, Mexico, Netherlands and the UK). By this time Panaghi had also built a small studio in Long Island and brought in other musicians and staff to make records.

== Educational background ==
The producer studied business management and marketing at Adelphi University, graduating in 1996 with a Bachelor of Arts in marketing. I

== Radio and print ==
Chris Panaghi has co-hosted "The Island Underground" with B-Man (Brian Rosenberg), a syndicated radio show broadcast on Garden City-based WLIR. He has also featured or guest DJ'd on stations such as Sirius XM Radio, XM Radio, 88.7 WRHU.

In addition to broadcasting, Panaghi has been a Billboard reporter and has written for DMA (Dance Music Authority), Streetsounds and Prime Cuts U.K.

== Chart success ==
Panaghi has achieved chart success with a number of singles achieving gold and/or platinum status. Seven songs from his 2008 album "Now's The Time" charted in the Billboard Dance Club Play Chart, with two breaking the top 5 – 'The Feeling' and 'The Time'. He has also achieved BillBoard chart success with 'As Good as Sin' featuring Sophia Cruz.

He has produced remixes for a range of artists including Michael Jackson, Gloria Estefan, Celine Dion, Jessica Simpson, Celia Cruz, Jon Secada, Marc Anthony, Aqua and Yoko Ono. In 2005 he was commissioned by Sony (Greece) to remix 'My Number One', which had won the Eurovision Song Contest for Greece. The remix achieved European success for the release, going gold and reaching number one in both Greece and Sweden.

Year	Song	Album	Artist	Record label	Status
2005	"My Number One"	Protereotita	Helena Paparizou	Sony Music Greece	Gold
2002	"A New Day Has Come"	A New Day Has Come	Celine Dion	Epic Records	Gold & Platinum
2007	"En Que Fallamos"	Sentimiento	Ivy Queen	Universal Music Group	Gold & Platinum
2002	"I've Got You"	Mended	Marc Anthony	Columbia Records	Gold
2000	"Como Me Duele Perderte"	Alma Caribeña	Gloria Estefan	Epic Records	Gold & Platinum
1999	"Is It Scary"	Blood on the Dance Floor: HIStory in the Mix	Michael Jackson	Epic Records	Gold & Platinum
1998	"Oye!"	Gloria!	Gloria Estefan	Epic Records	Gold & Platinum
1997	"Lollipop"	Aquarium	Aqua	MCA Music	Gold & Platinum
2003	"Ella Tiene Fuego"	Ella Tiene Fuego (Remixes)	Celia Cruz	Sony Discos	Gold & Platinum

== International ==
While best known in the U.S. Panaghi has also performed in Europe, growing a fan base in France, Germany, Greece, Netherlands and the UK and has been described as a 'key player in the field' by USA Greek Reporter.

== Remixing technique ==
Chris Panaghi had solo responsibility for remixes and original productions for artists such as Gloria Estefan and Michael Jackson through DJG Records. Other artists he has worked with include: Jessica Simpson, Celia Cruz, Jon Secada, Marc Anthony, Aqua and Yoko Ono. Panaghi has additionally remixed for Sony in Greece and ZYX in Germany.

Chris also runs the record label Amathus Music, a label that has produced artists such as Laylah, Kamarova and Keven Maroda. Alongside this, it has produced the compilation series 50 Techno Club Tracks – Vol.1 and Vol.2, which broke the top 100 iTunes Dance Charts worldwide.

== Select discography ==
=== Albums ===
2008

- "Hands Up: Anthems"
- "Now's the Time", DJG Records
- "You Just Don't Get It", DJG Records
- "My Life", DJG Records

2007

- "The Essentials", Sub Deep Haven
- "Pump", Sub Deep Haven

2006

- "The Time", DJG Records
- "Working the Mix", Water Music Dance

2004

- "Tranceflux", Benz-Street

2002

- "Live in the Mix with DJ Chris "The Greek" Panaghi", 24-7 / Artemis Records
- "Thump'n Freestyle Quick Mixx, Vol.3", Thump Records

2001

- "Peak Hour, Vol.2", Saifam

2000

- "Peak Hour", Megahit Records

1998

- "You're in My House", Aureus Records

=== Compilations ===
1999

- "Dance Floor Rituals", Waako Records

=== Singles and EPs ===
2008

- "My Life", DJG Records
- "Movin' On", DJG Records
- "My House Is Your House", DJG Records
- "The Feeling", DJG Records
- "The Time", DJG Records
- "Time Will Never (Fade Me Away)", DJG Records
- "You Just Don't Get It", DJG Records

2006'

- "Pump",

2005

- "The Feeling", DJG Records
- "As Good As Sin", DJG Records
- "I Wanna Feel The Music", DJG Records
- "With You", Amathus Music
- "Movin' On", DJG Records

2000

- "Get Up"
- '"Essential EP"'

1997

- "Funky", ZYX Music
- "Funky (Remixes)"

=== Selected remixes ===
2010

- "Outta Control", Laylah

2006

- "My Number One", Helena Paparizou

2005

- "Give Peace A Chance", Yoko Ono
- "My Number One", Helena Paparizou

2004

- "The Air That I Breathe", Judy Torres
- "This Is Reina", Reina

2002

- "A New Day Has Come", Celine Dion

1999

- "Oye", Gloria Estefan

1997

- "Is It Scary", Michael Jackson
