= Radio García-Serra =

Radio García-Serra was a Cuban radio station active between the 1930s and the 1950s.

== History ==
Jorge García-Serra founded Radio García-Serra in Havana in late 1929. It was the second radio station established in Havana, and broadcast under the call letters CMCU at a frequency of 660 kc which, at the time and throughout the 1950s, was the only frequency with a clear international frequency that could not be blocked or interfered.

In the early stages, Radio García-Serra broadcast music and on-air novellas written by distinguished Cuban and Spanish writers of the time.

During the late 1940s and 1950s, the children of Jorge García-Serra owned and managed the radio station, and Roberto García-Serra was named the General Manager.

In the late 1940s, when studio live radio-broadcast performances were common, Radio García-Serra broadcast a program at 5 PM called Hora del Té ("Tea Time") where Celia Cruz, the world-famous singer and representative of Cuba, had her beginnings. Also making a debut in Radio García-Serra in that same year was Fajardo y sus Estrellas. Other late 1950s studio live performances included Orquesta Aragón, Orquesta Sensación and Barbarito Díez.
