= ASCAP Latin Heritage Award =

Music award

- Awarded for: "recognition of their unique and enduring contributions to Latin music"
- Country: United States
- Presented by: American Society of Composers, Authors and Publishers (ASCAP)
- First award: 1999
- Website: www.ascap.com

The ASCAP Latin Heritage Award is an award presented by the American Society of Composers, Authors and Publishers (ASCAP) during the ASCAP Latin Awards, in "recognition of their unique and enduring contributions to Latin music". The award was first presented to Celia Cruz.

== Recipients ==
- 2019 - Milly Quezada
- 2018 - not presented
- 2017 - El Gran Combo de Puerto Rico
- 2016 - not presented
- 2015 - La Original Banda El Limón
- 2014 - Fania All-Stars
- 2013 - not presented
- 2012 - not presented
- 2011 - Alejandro Sanz
- 2010 - Armando Manzanero
- 2009 - Ricardo Montaner
- 2008 - not presented
- 2007 - Franco De Vita
- 2006 - Ricardo Arjona
- 2005 - not presented
- 2004 - Ednita Nazario
- 2003 - Olga Tañón
- 2002 - Gilberto Santa Rosa
- 2001 - not presented
- 2000 - Antonio Aguilar
- 1999 - Celia Cruz
