= 2004 Latin Billboard Music Awards =

Annual American music awards ceremony

2004 Billboard Latin Music Awards
- Date: April 29, 2004
- Venue: Miami Arena, Miami, Florida

Below are the winners of the 2004 Billboard Latin Music Awards, handed out April 29 in Miami.

== Hot Latin Song of the Year ==
=== Hot Latin Song of the Year ===
- Tal Vez — Ricky Martin (Sony Discos)

=== Vocal Duet or Collaboration ===
- Fotografía — Juanes With Nelly Furtado (Surco/Universal Latino)

=== Artist of the Year ===
- Conjunto Primavera (Fonovisa)

== People ==
=== Songwriter of the Year ===
- Juanes

=== Producer of the Year ===
- Rudy Perez (8 titles)

== Latin Pop Albums ==
=== Male ===
- Almas Del Silencio — Ricky Martin (Sony Discos)

=== Female ===
- Por Ti — Ednita Nazario (Sony Discos)

=== Duo or Group ===
- 4 — A.B. Quintanilla III Presents Kumbia Kings (EMI Latin)

=== New Artist ===
- Corazon Latino — David Bisbal (Vale/Universal Latino)

=== Telemundo's Viewers Choice Awards ===
- David Bisbal

== Top Latin Albums Artist of the Year ==
- Celia Cruz (Sony Discos)

== Latin Rock/Alternative Album of the Year ==
- Coming Up (EP) — Ozomatli (Concord Picante/Concord)

== Tropical Album of the Year ==
=== Male ===
- Buenos Hermanos — Ibrahim Ferrer (World Circuit/Nonesuch/AG)

=== Female ===
- Regalo Del Alma — Celia Cruz (Sony Discos)

=== Duo Or Group ===
- Mas Flow — Luny Tunes & Norgie Noriega (VI Music)

=== New Artist ===
- Mas Flow — Luny Tunes & Noriega (VI Music)

== Regional Mexican Airplay Song of the Year ==
=== Male Solo Artist ===
- Tu Amor O Tu Desprecio — Marco Antonio Solís (Fonovisa/UG)

=== Male Duo or Group ===
- De Durango A Chicago — Grupo Montéz de Durango (Disa)

=== Female Group or Female Solo Artist ===
- Dulce Y Salado — Ana Gabriel (Sony Discos)

=== New Artist ===
- Proyecto Akwid — Akwid (Univision/UG)

== Latin Tour of the Year ==
- Luis Miguel (Warner Latina)

== Other Latin ==
=== Latin Dance Club Play Track of the Year ===
- Seduceme/Seduce Me Now (Remixes) — India (Sony Discos/Jellybean)

=== Latin Rap/Hip-Hop Album of the Year ===
- Proyecto Akwid — Akwid (Univision/UG)

=== Latin Greatest Hits Album of the Year ===
- Hits Mix — Celia Cruz (Sony Discos)

=== Latin Compilation Album of the Year ===
- 30 Gruperas De Coleccion — Various Artists (Univision/UG)

=== Latin Jazz Album of the Year ===
- Trumpet Evolution — Arturo Sandoval (Crescent Moon/Columbia/Sony Music)

=== Latin Dance Single of the Year ===
- I'm Glad" (Paul Oakenfold Remix) — Jennifer Lopez (Epic/Sony Music)

== Labels ==
=== Publisher of the Year ===
- EMI April — ASCAP

=== Publishing Corporation of the Year ===
- EMI Music Publishing

== New Categories ==
=== Latin Pop Airplay Track of the Year, Male ===
- Tal Vez — Ricky Martin (Sony Discos)

=== Latin Pop Airplay Track of the Year, Female ===
- Hoy — Gloria Estefan (Epic Records/Sony Discos)

=== Latin Pop Airplay Track of the Year, Duo or Group ===
- Fotografía — Juanes With Nelly Furtado (Surco/Universal Latino)

=== Latin Pop Airplay Track of the Year, New Artist ===
- Alucinado — Tiziano Ferro (EMI Latin)

=== Tropical/Salsa Airplay Track of the Year, Male ===
- Si Te Dijeron — Gilberto Santa Rosa (Sony Discos)

=== Tropical/Salsa Airplay Track of the Year, Female ===
- Seduceme — La India (Sony Discos)
- Dile — Ivy Queen (Universal Latino)
- Ríe y Llora — Celia Cruz (Sony Discos)

=== Tropical/Salsa Airplay Track of the Year, Duo or Group ===
- Se Nos Perdio El Amor — El Gran Combo De Puerto Rico (Combo)

=== Tropical/Salsa Airplay Track of the Year, New Artist ===
- Intentalo Tu — Joe Veras (J&N)
- 12 Discípulos — Eddie Dee featuring Daddy Yankee, Ivy Queen, Tego Calderón, Julio Voltio, Vico C, Zion, Lennox, Nicky Jam, Johnny Prez, Gallego, and Wiso G (Diamond)

=== Regional Mexican Airplay Track of the Year, Male Solo Artist ===
- Quedate Callada — Jorge Luis Cabrera (Disa)

== Regional Mexican Airplay Track of the Year, Male Group ==
- Una Vez Mas — Conjunto Primavera (Fonovisa)

== Regional Mexican Airplay Track of the Year, Female Group or Female Solo Artist ==
- Ay! Papacito (Uy! Daddy) — Limite (Universal Latino)

== Regional Mexican Airplay Track of the Year, New Artist ==
- Y Como Quieres Que Te Quiera — Fabian Gomez (Sony Discos)

== Latin Christian/Gospel Album of the Year ==
- Milagro — Jaci Velasquez (Sony Discos)

== Billboards' "Hall of Fame Award" ==
- Banda El Recodo

== The "Spirit of Hope" award ==
- Soraya

== "Star Award" ==
- Alejandro Fernandez

== Label Awards ==
=== Hot Latin Tracks Label Of the Year ===
- Sony

=== Top Latin Albums Label Of the Year ===
- Univision Music Group

=== Latin Pop Airplay Label Of the Year ===
- Sony

=== Tropical/Salsa Airplay Label Of the Year ===
- Sony

=== Regional Mexican Airplay Label of the Year ===
- Fonovisa

=== Latin Pop Albums Label Of the Year ===
- Sony

=== Tropical/Salsa Albums Label Of the Year ===
- Sony

=== Regional Mexican Albums Label of the Year ===
- Univision Music Group

== See also ==
- Billboard Latin Music Awards
- Billboard Music Award
