= Celia Cruz and Friends: A Night of Salsa =

Live album by Celia Cruz
- Released: December 7, 1999
- Recorded: May 12, 1999
- Genre: Salsa
- Length: 41:58
- Label: RMM
- Producer: Jon Fausty

Celia Cruz chronology
Queen of the Tropics (2000)	Celia Cruz and Friends: A Night of Salsa (1999)	Inigualable (2000)

Professional ratings
Review scores
Source	Rating
Allmusic	3/5 stars

Celia Cruz and Friends: A Night of Salsa is a live album by Cuban salsa musician Celia Cruz. The album was recorded during a concert on May 12, 1999, in Hartford, Connecticut, which was broadcast by PBS. Among the participants of the concert were Tito Puente, Johnny Pacheco, La India, and Isidro Infante. The album peaked at number twelve on the Billboard Tropical Albums chart. The album received a Latin Grammy Award for Best Salsa Album and a nomination for Tropical Album of the Year at the Lo Nuestro Awards of 2001.

== Track listing ==
No.	Title	Writer(s)	Length
1.	"Mi Vida Es Cantar"	Victor Daniel	04:19
2.	"La Dicha Mia"	Johnny Pacheco	07:28
3.	"La Vida Es Un Carnaval"	Victor Daniel	05:13
4.	"Celia Y Tito"	Johnny Pacheco	07:31
5.	"Medley Siboney/Babalu/El Cumbachero"	Rafael Hernandez, Ernesto Lecuona, Margarita Lecuona	04:53
6.	"Azúcar Negra"	Mario Diaz	02:57
7.	"Usted Abusó"	Pepe Avila, Jose Carlos Figueiredo, Antonio Carles Marques Pinto	04:55
8.	"La Voz De La Experiencia"	La India, Isidro Infante	07:28
9.	"El Guaba"	Johnny Pacheco	05:01
10.	"Quimbara"	Junior Cepeda	05:47
11.	"Cucala"	Wilfredo Figueroa	05:28
12.	"Bemba Colora"	Horacio Santos	08:38
13.	"Guantanamera"	Joseíto Fernández / Julian Orban / Peter Seeger	07:12
