= Fernando Osorio =

- Origin: Bogotá, Colombia
- Genres: Pop, rock
- Occupation: Singer-songwriter
- Labels: WEA Latina, Respek
- Website: fernandoosorio.com

Fernando Osorio is a singer-songwriter, born in Bogotá, Colombia, and raised in Caracas, Venezuela.

== Early life ==
At age seven, Osorio played the cuatro, violin, flute and viola in Emil Friedman school.

== Career ==
In 1982, while being a member of the choir of his church in Caracas, met Juan Carlos Perez and formed the duo Fernando y Juan Carlos. They recorded in 1985 their first album, which was only released in Venezuela. Osorio also has had combined a parallel career as a songwriter. Venezuelan performer Guillermo Dávila recorded in 1984 "Definitivamente" written by Osorio, being the first time someone recorded a song by Osorio (aside from his band). Karina and Ricardo Montaner followed Dávila and also included songs by Osorio on their respective albums. As a writer, his first success overseas came with "Sólo Con Un Beso" recorded by Montaner in 1988. The song peaked at number seven in the Billboard Hot Latin Songs (formerly Hot Latin Tracks) in the United States. Osorio also composed "Ojos Negros" and "Vamos a Dejarlo" for Montaner's debut album. Osorio recorded a self-titled debut album in 1993. In 1996, he wrote "Lloraré" for Jerry Rivera's album Fresco, reaching number-one on the Latin Tropical Airplay chart. A year later he wrote "Se Mi Aire" for Mexican singer Cristian Castro. Castro also covered "Lloraré" and included those songs on the Grammy Award nominated album Lo Mejor de Mí. Osorio also wrote "Moja Mi Corazón" with Andrés Levin, the first single of Azabache, a 1997 studio album released by Spanish singer Marta Sánchez. The track became a Top 20 hit in the United States Latin charts and number-one on the Latin Pop Airplay chart. The same year, Osorio signed a recording contract with WEA Latina and wrote 40 songs for his first album under this contract. In 1998 the album was released under the title Con Palabras. According to the writer, this album included eleven "stories of love, with personal and some borrowed feelings." Osorio received a nomination for Best New Artist at the 1st Latin Grammy Awards, losing to Cuban singer Ibrahim Ferrer.

=== As a writer ===
Luis Enrique, Marc Anthony, MDO, Frankie Negrón, Huey Dunbar and Celia Cruz have also recorded songs written by Osorio. The track "Con Cada Beso", a top five hit for Huey Dunbar, was recognized as the Best Salsa Song of 2002 by the American Society of Composers, Authors and Publishers. Celia Cruz recorded "La Negra Tiene Tumbao" by request of Sergio George, who was producing Cruz' (then) new album; the lyrics for the song came related to the incident that Cruz had with Andy Montáñez on political issues for some years and because of these differences, the "Guarachera" was booed in Puerto Rico. While praising Cruz attitude, who was able to successfully overcome this difficult time with the public, Osorio said: "¡Oye, esa negra es brava y tiene tumbao!" ("Hey, that woman is fierce and has tumbao!), "¡Celia camina de frente!" (Celia walks up to the front!); thus was born the idea for the song. This track was nominated for two Latin Grammy Awards, Record of the Year and Song of the Year at the 2002 ceremony. "La Negra Tiene Tumbao'" spent 89 weeks in the Latin Tropical Airplay chart and peaked at number two in the Hot Latin Songs chart. Osorio also wrote the Spanish lyrics for "Soy Tu Lluvia", a track included on Soy, an album released by Mexican singer Alejandra Guzmán which also was awarded a Latin Grammy.

Osorio and Alejandra Guzman wrote Spanish lyrics for "Amor En Suspenso", a song written by Roxanne Seeman and Philipp Steinke, for Guzman's Único album released in November 2009, reaching Gold status in Mexico. Osorio also composed the last track recorded by Celia Cruz before her death: "Rie y Llora" ("Laugh and Cry"); the song reached number-one on the Latin Tropical Airplay and earned Osorio a Latin Grammy in 2004 for Best Tropical Song. The writer stated about his relation with Cruz: "Celia [Cruz] asked for the song to be the main theme of the album, because she was very identified." Osorio also was nominated for Best Tropical Song at the Latin Grammy Awards of 2010 for the track "Sueño Contigo", co-written by Jorge L. Chacin and performed by Tecupae featuring Cabas.
