= Grammy Award for Best Salsa/Merengue Album =

Music award category

The Grammy Award for Best Salsa/Merengue Album was first awarded in 2004. Before 2004 the awards for Best Salsa Album and Merengue Album were separate.

Years reflect the year in which the Grammy Awards were presented, for works released in the previous year.

== Recipients ==
Year	Winner	Nominations
2004	Regalo del Alma by Celia Cruz	Tequila y Ron... A Tribute to José Alfredo Jiménez by Ismael Miranda; Latin Songbird: Mi Alma y Corazón by India; Perseverancia by Tito Rojas; Música Universal by Truco & Zaperoko; Le Preguntaba a La Luna by Víctor Manuelle
2005	Across 110th Street by Spanish Harlem Orchestra featuring Rubén Blades	Auténtico by Gilberto Santa Rosa; Valió la Pena by Marc Anthony; Creciendo by Son de Cali; Travesía by Víctor Manuelle
2006	Son del Alma by Willy Chirino	Fabricando Fantasías by Tito Nieves; Llegó la Hora by Mayito Rivera; Después del Silencio by Eddie Santiago; Arroz con Mango by Tiempo Libre

== See also ==
- Grammy Award for Best Tropical Latin Album
