= La Negra Tiene Tumbao =

Studio album by Celia Cruz
- Released: 2 October 2001
- Genre: Salsa · Latin pop
- Length: 44:03
- Label: Sony Discos
- Producer: Sergio George · Isidro Infante · Johnny Pacheco · Oscar Gomez · Angel Carrasco

Celia Cruz chronology
Siempre Viviré (2000)	La Negra Tiene Tumbao (2001)	Hits Mix (2002)

Singles from La Negra Tiene Tumbao
- 1. "La Negra Tiene Tumbao" Released: 2001; 2. "Hay Que Empezar Otra Vez" Released: 2002; 3. "Pa' Arriba No Va" Released: 2002

La Negra Tiene Tumbao (English: The Black Woman's Got Style) is the 59th album recorded by Cuban salsa recording artist Celia Cruz. It was released by Sony Music on 2 October 2001. It features musical collaborations with Mikey Perfecto and Johnny Pacheco and was produced by Sergio George, Isidro Infante, Pacheco, Oscar Gomez, and Angel Carrasco.

Upon release, the album debuted at number five on the Billboard Latin Albums chart and number two on the Billboard Tropical Albums chart. It also managed to debut at number thirty-eight on the Billboard Heatseekers Albums. At the third Latin Grammy Awards, the album won Best Salsa Album and was nominated for Album of the Year. Also, It won Tropical Album of the Year at Premio Lo Nuestro 2003. The lead single from the album and title track, "La Negra Tiene Tumbao", was nominated for Song of the Year, Record of the Year and Best Music Video. It featured two other singles, "Hay Que Empezar Otra Vez" and "Pa' Arriba No Va".

== Recording and production ==
Producer Sergio George was hired to produce more traditional tracks for the album. However, George wanted to try something different. According to George, he played a demo version of "La Negra Tiene Tumbao" for Cruz, "not knowing how she would respond, and that was the song that she most reacted to". "La Negra Tiene Tumbao" was the last song completed for the album.

== Release and promotion ==
The album was released on 2 October 2001 by Sony Discos. Sony Discos rereleased the album on 30 October 2001. On 23 July 2002, the album was rereleased with a bonus track remix of "La Negra Tiene Tumbao".

== Musical composition ==
The lead single, first track, and title track, "La Negra Tiene Tumbao" combines elements of salsa music, reggae music and hip hop music. The song's title translates (from Cuban slang Spanish, as in music of Afro-Cuban origin, tumbao is the basic rhythm played on the bass) to "The Black Woman has Style" or "The Black Woman has Attitude". The song was composed in minor key and incorporates the use of vocal call and response.

== Chart performance ==
La Negra Tiene Tumbao achieved significant commercial success upon its release, with Cruz expressing surprise at the album's initial sales. It peaked at number five of US Billboard Latin Albums and number two of US Tropical albums. She recalled that initially found it difficult to believe reports that large numbers of copies were being purchased, later attributing the response to the album's combination of traditional salsa with more contemporary rhythms. Cruz specifically credited producer Sergio George's arrangements for incorporating modern elements into the record.

Cruz described the stylistic approach as consistent with her longstanding effort to keep her music current. At the suggestion of her manager, she encouraged George to incorporate elements of rap and hip hop into several songs, a decision she said she was proud of. She characterized the album as retaining enough traditional salsa for her established audience while also incorporating sounds that younger listeners could "identify with and dance to", describing that balance as a key factor in her continued commercial success.

After her 2002 tour of Europe, the album re-entered the Billboard Latin Albums chart at number thirty-seven for the week of 3 August 2002. It also reentered the Billboard Tropical Albums chart at number six. It was the 6th of Billboard Top Tropical/Salsa Albums of 2002.

Following Cruz's death in July 2003, La Negra Tiene Tumbao reentered the Billboard Latin Albums chart at number eight, for the week of 2 August 2003. It also reentered the Billboard Tropical Albums chart at number two, behind Cruz's own Hits Mix (2002).

== Critical reception ==
Professional ratings
Review scores
Source	Rating
Allmusic	4/5 stars

Allmusic's Sharon Witmer awarded the album four out of five stars, providing a positive review of the album. She claimed the recording to have "mesmerzing" rhythms as well as "warm and zesty" music. Witmer complimented "La Negra Tiene Tumbao", calling it the "CD's biggest draw". She ended her review by stating "From start to finish, the CD swings, as the electrifying and indefatigable Celia Cruz proves once again that being young is a state of mind." According to Billboard magazine's Leila Cobo, "La Negra Tiene Tumbao", "with its mid-section rap became the blueprint—to this day—for a bust of recordings featuring much younger acts." The song has been considered one of Cruz's last hits before her death in July 2003.

The song received nominations for Record of the Year, Song of the Year, and Music Video of the Year at the Latin Grammy Awards of 2002. The parent album won the Latin Grammy Award for Best Salsa Album. It was nominated for Album of the Year. The album won the Lo Nuestro Award for Tropical Album of the Year at the 2003 Lo Nuestro Awards The song was also nominated Tropical Song of the Year, eventually losing to Cruz's own "La Vida Es Un Carnaval". It received a nomination for Best "Party Starter" at the 2004 Premios Juventud. "La Vida Es Un Carnaval" was also nominated in the same category. In 2016, the song was awarded Television Theme Song of the Year, for the television program Celia, at the American Society of Composers, Authors and Publishers Awards.

== Track listing ==
No.	Title	Writer(s)	Length
1.	"La Negra Tiene Tumbao"	Sergio George, Fernando Osorio	04:16
2.	"Pa' Arriba No Va"	Jorge Piloto	04:25
3.	"Hay Que Empezar Otra Vez"	Victor Daniel	04:41
4.	"Tararea Kumbayea"	Johnny Pacheco	03:52
5.	"Corazón De Rumba"	Mario Diaz	04:21
6.	"Déjenme Vivir"	Juliana Serra	04:15
7.	"Qué Culpa Tengo Yo"	George	04:32
8.	"Mi Mercancía"	Federico Llado, Rafael Lugo	04:39
9.	"Taita Bilongo"	Gradelio Perez, Alain Perez	04:26
10.	"Sin Clave No Hay Son"	Marisela Verena	04:46

=== Notes ===
- "La Negra Tiene Tumbao", "Pa' Arriba No Va", "Corazón de Rumba", "Qué Culpa Tengo Yo", "Mi Mercancía" and "Taita Bilongo" were produced by Sergio George.
- "Hay Que Empezar Otra Vez" and "Sin Clave No Hay Son" were produced by Isidro Infante.
- "Tararea Kumbayea" and "Déjenme Vivir" were produced by Johnny Pacheco.

== Personnel ==
- Photography – Adolfo Perez Butron
- Composer – Alain Perez
- Production Coordination – Alberto Darna
- Executive Producer – Angel Carrasco
- Congas – Bill Romero
- Arranger – Bobby Valentin
- Bass – Carlos Henriquez
- Linear Notes, Primary Artist – Celia Cruz
- Composer – Federico Llado
- Composer – Fernando Osorio
- Composer – Gradelio Perez
- Engineer, Guitar – Guido Diaz
- Maracas – Hector Casanova
- Trumpet – Hector Colon
- Arranger, Keyboards, Piano, Producer – Isidro Infante
- Background Vocals – Jhon Jairo Ibanez
- Background Vocals – Joe King
- Baritone Saxophone – John Scarpulla
- Arranger, Composer, Guest Artist, Harmonica, Percussion, Producer, Background Vocals – Johnny Pacheco
- Mixing Engineer – Jon Fausty
- Bongos – Jorge Gonzalez
- Composer – Jorge Luis Piloto
- Bass – Jose Tavares
- Composer – Juliana Serra
- Percussion – Luis Quintero
- Production Coordination – Maite Palencia
- Percussion, Timbales – Marc Quinones
- Background Vocals – Marco Antonio Ibanez
- Engineer – Mario DeJesus
- Composer – Mario Diaz
- Graphic Design – Mario Houben
- Composer – Marisela Verena
- Mastering – Mike Fuller
- Production Coordination – Mike Rivera
- Guest Artist – Mikey Perfecto
- Arranger, Baritone Saxophone – Nelson Hernandez
- Background Vocals – Nestor Sanchez
- Executive Producer – Oscar Gomez
- Trombone – Ozzie Melendez
- Trombone – Pablo Santaella
- Arranger, Piano – Papo Lucca
- Composer – Rafael Lugo
- Trumpet – Raul Agraz
- Bongos – Ray Colon
- Congas – Richie Flores
- Trumpet – Roberto Luis Rodriguez
- Bass – Ruben Rodriguez
- Arranger, Composer, Drum Programming, Keyboards, Piano, Producer – Sergio George
- Production Coordination – Susana Ensin Tarrino
- Arranger, Composer – Victor Daniel
- Piano – Willie Rodriguez

== Charts ==
=== Weekly charts ===
Chart (2003)	Peak Position
US Heatseekers Albums	38
US Latin Albums (Billboard)	5
US Tropical Albums (Billboard)	2

=== Year-end charts ===
Chart (2002)	Position
US Tropical Albums (Billboard)	6

Chart (2003)	Position
US Tropical Albums (Billboard)	7

== Sales and certifications ==
Region	Certification	Certified units/sales
United States (RIAA)	Platinum (Latin)	100,000^{^}
^{^} Shipments figures based on certification alone.
