= Sergio George =

American pianist (born 1961)

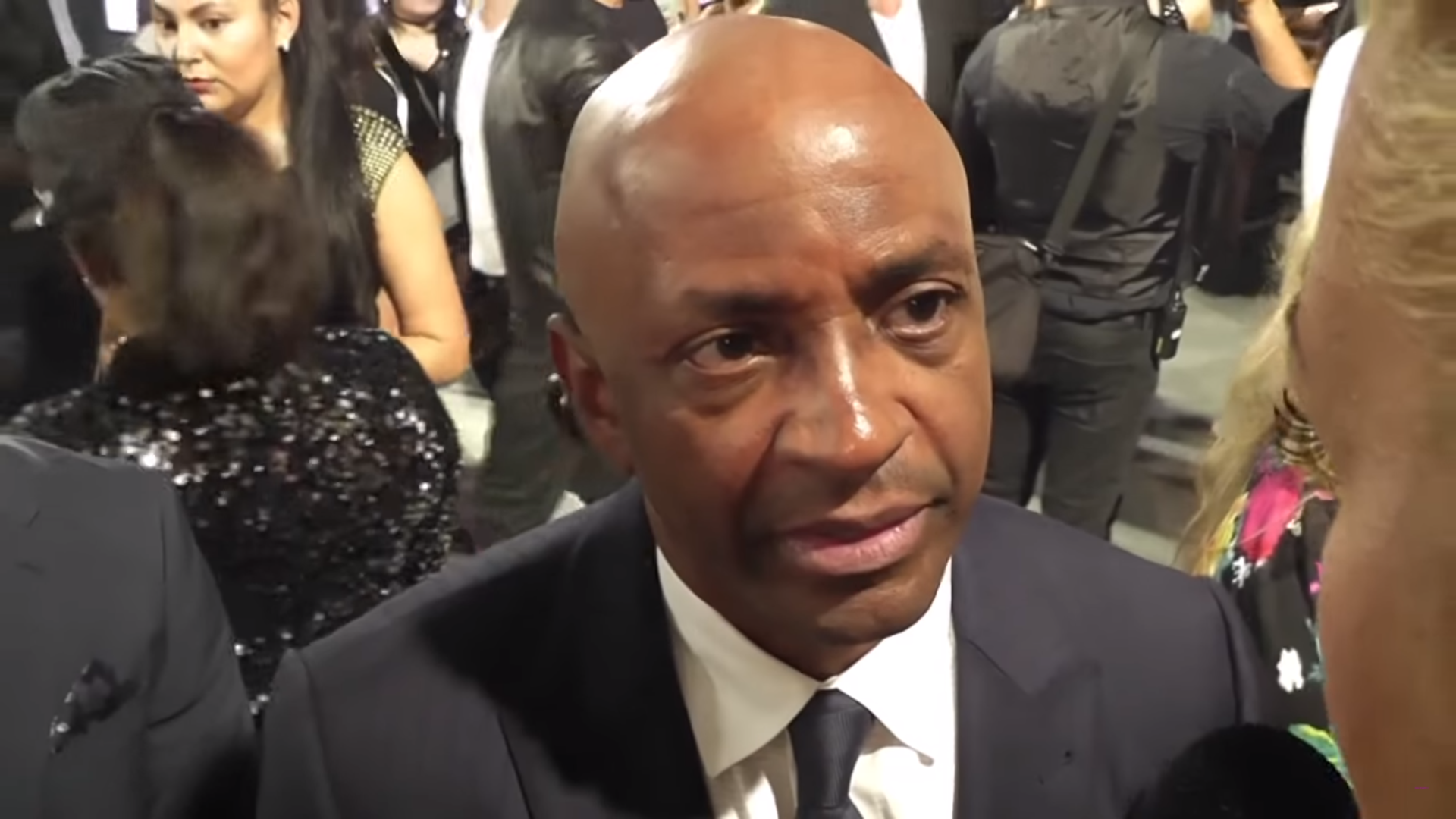
- Sergio George at the 2016 Premios Juventud

Background information
- Born: May 23, 1961 (age 65); New York City, U.S.
- Genres: Salsa; Latin pop; bachata
- Occupations: Pianist; arranger; producer; composer; musical director; A&R
- Labels: RMM; Sony Discos; Sir George; WEA Latina; SGZ; La Calle; Top Stop; NuAmerica

Sergio George (born May 23, 1961) is an American pianist, arranger, and record producer, known for working with many famous performers of salsa music, although he has worked in other genres of the music industry as well. He has worked with some of Latin music's most popular artists starting with Marc Anthony, DLG, Jennifer Lopez, Tito Nieves, Víctor Manuelle, Frankie Negrón, Johnny Rivera, Ray Sepúlveda, Tito Puente, Thalia, Orquesta de la Luz, Ivy Queen, Celia Cruz, La India, Jerry Rivera, Bacilos, Leslie Grace, Toby Love, Cheo Feliciano, Prince Royce, Ricardo Arjona, Anthony Ramos, Liz Elias, Indy Flow, among others.

== Biography ==
George, the son of Puerto Rican parents, was born and raised in New York City, and attended the City College of New York. He had started his professional career with Conjunto Caché and Conjunto Clásico in 1979, then moved on to session recordings and live performances during the 1980s. Starting in 1987, George was musical director for several album recordings, including being pianist for Grupo Star for their 1987 album "Grupo Star", and lived in Colombia for a year. During this period he was also a member of Grupo Baruc and their release of the album "Reeencuentro" in 1988. It was not until he became the producer of Tito Nieves's first album "The Classic" for RMM in 1988 that his status as one of the most sought-after salsa producers was stamped. Also in 1988, he was the producer and musical director for Johnny & Ray's (later became Johnny Ray) first album "Mascarada" with vocalist Ray Sepulveda.

George later became the main visionary behind the New York-based Latin label RMM Records & Video, between 1988 and 1995, arranging, producing, and directing dozens of recordings for that label, working with artists like Jose Alberto 'El Canario', Johnny Rivera, Domingo Quinones, Tony Vega, Ray Sepulveda, Cheo Feliciano, Celia Cruz, La India and others. He produced the 1991 album "100th LP" for Tito Puente, produced & arranged the first two albums of Marc Anthony, "Otra Nota" & "Todo A Su Tiempo". George also produced the platinum-selling "Combinacion Perfecta" album from Familia RMM in 1993. He also produced and sessioned in recordings outside of RMM during this period, including albums with Nestor Sanchez, Junior Gonzalez, Africando and Los Hermanos Colon, as well as arranging several hit songs, including his arrangement on the hit track "Solo" for Luis Enrique on his 1989 album "Mi Mundo".

In early 1995, George left RMM to pursue his own producing venture with Sir George Entertainment, and had a producing agreement with Sony Discos. During this time, he formed DLG, featuring vocalist Huey Dunbar and rappers James 'Da Barba' and Fragancia. He also helped in re-inventing Victor Manuelle into one of the Salsa's most powerful artists. His producing credits continued on with WEA Latina by 1997 with Frankie Negron, Charlie Cruz, Charlie Cardona, Servando Y Florentino and many other salsa performers. In early 2004, Sergio George and Latin recording executive George Zamora created SGZ Entertainment, in Miami, Florida, focusing on urban artists. In August 2006, SGZ Entertainment became part of La Calle Records, a sublabel of Univision. During the 2008 Latin Grammy Awards, Sergio George won Producer of the Year for his work on "Historia De Taxi" by Ricardo Arjona featuring Marc Anthony, "La Vida Se Va" by Gloria Trevi, "Mi Mayor Sacrificio" by Tito Nieves featuring Marco Antonio Solís, "Quiero Decirte Que Te Amo" by DLG featuring Ness, "Toro Mata" by DLG featuring Napoles and Ness and the album El Cantante by Marc Anthony.

In 2009, George founded Top Stop Music, and the first release was with Luis Enrique and his album, Ciclos which has topped the charts and garnered two Latin Grammy awards. He signed Prince Royce, whose self-titled debut album was released early 2010. At the end of 2009, La India signed with Top Stop Music, having her first single released in early 2010, "Estupida" which quickly reached number one on the US Billboard Tropical Songs chart. Her album, Unica, was released by Top Stop Music in 2010.

At the 11th Latin Grammy Awards, George received his second Latin Grammy for Producer of the Year, for his work on "Corazón Sin Cara", "Tu y Yo" and "Stand By Me" by Prince Royce, "Estúpida", "Si Él Te Habla De Mi", "Smile" and "Te Vas a Arrepentir" by La India.

In 2013, George released "Sergio George Presents Salsa Giants" and became a platinum-selling hit record worldwide. At the 14th Latin Grammy Awards, George took home a trio of Latin Grammys for Producer of the Year, Producer of Marc Anthony's Record of the Year "Vivir Mi Vida" and Best Salsa Album for "Sergio George Presents Salsa Giants."

In 2023, George released “¡ATACA SERGIO! INQUEBRANTABLE,” on Amazon. George gives fans a behind the scenes look at his life and his 43 year career in the music industry.

Studio Albums

- Sergio George Presents, Salsa Giants 2013
- Sergio George Presents, Salsa Giants - EP 2014
