= Celia Cruz =

Cuban singer (1925–2003)

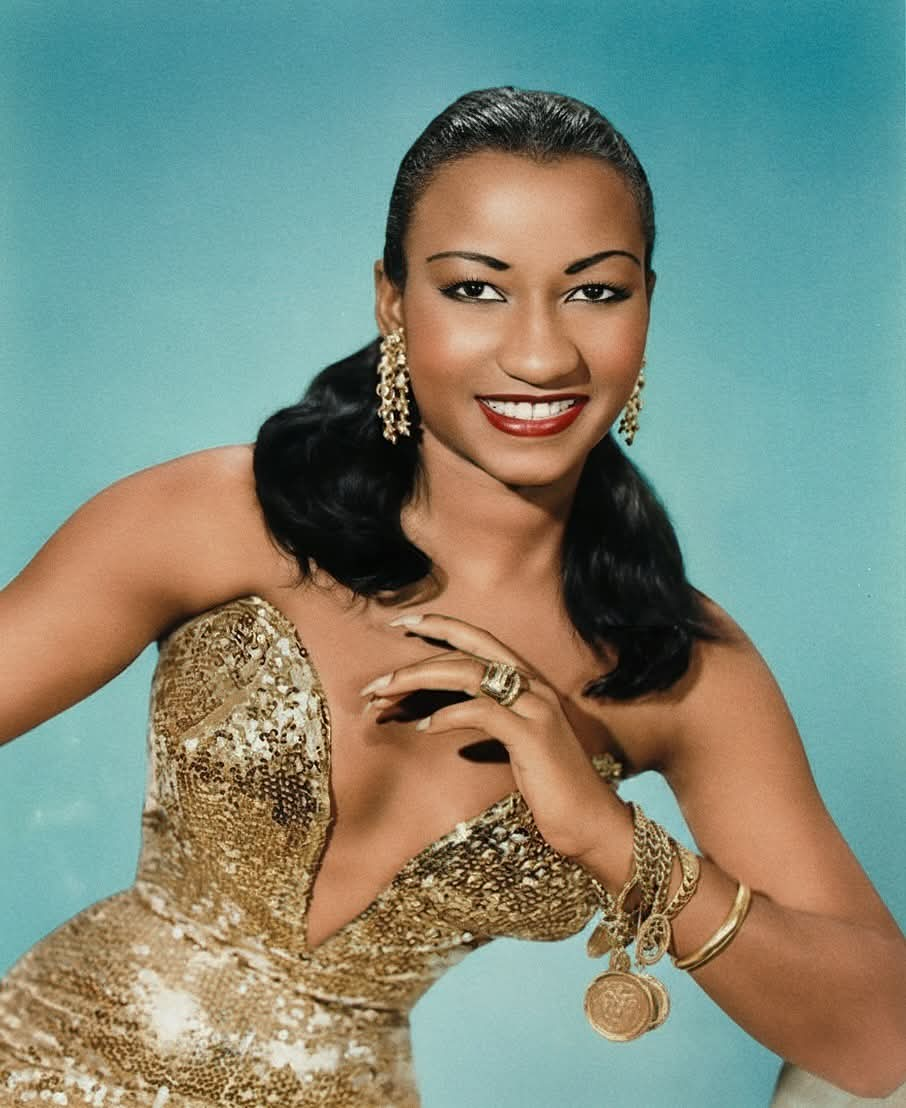
- Cruz in 1957

Background information
- Born: Celia Caridad Cruz Alfonso; 21 October 1925; Havana, La Habana, Republic of Cuba
- Died: 16 July 2003 (aged 77) Fort Lee, New Jersey, U.S.
- Genres: Salsa; guaracha; son; bolero; rumba
- Occupations: Singer; actress
- Instrument: Vocals
- Years active: 1948–2003
- Labels: Seeco; Tico; Fania; Barbaro; RMM; Sony Discos
- Formerly of: Sonora Matancera
- Spouse: Pedro Knight (m. 1962)
- Resting place: Woodlawn Cemetery, The Bronx, New York, U.S.

Celia Caridad Cruz Alfonso (Note: In her autobiography, Celia gives her baptismal name as Úrsula Hilaria Celia Caridad Cruz Alfonso, which commemorates her birth on the feast day of Saint Ursula and Saint Hilarion. This name appears in most sources, including Encyclopedia Britannica, sometimes with the added epithet de la Santísima Trinidad. However, her birth certificate, registered on 16 January 1939, lists only Celia Caridad Cruz Alfonso. Later on, her Cuban passports and visas spelled her name Celia Caridad Cruz y Alfonso. Following her exile and marriage, her legal documents use the name Celia Cruz Knight until 1991, when she changed her name to simply Celia Cruz, which also appears on her death certificate and mausoleum.) (21 October 1925 – 16 July 2003), known as Celia Cruz, was a Cuban-American singer and one of the most popular Latin artists of the 20th century. Cruz rose to fame in Cuba during the 1950s as a singer of guarachas, earning the nickname La Guarachera de Cuba. In the following decades, she became known internationally as the "Queen of Salsa" due to her contributions to Latin music. She sold over 30 million records, making her one of the best-selling Latin music artists.

The artist began her career in her home country Cuba, earning recognition as a vocalist of the popular musical group Sonora Matancera, a musical association that lasted 15 years (1950–1965). Cruz mastered a wide variety of Afro-Cuban music styles including guaracha, rumba, afro, son, and bolero, recording numerous singles in these styles for Seeco Records.

In 1960, after the Cuban Revolution caused the nationalization of the music industry, Cruz left her native country, becoming one of the symbols and spokespersons of the Cuban community in exile. Cruz continued her career, first in Mexico, and then in the United States, the country that she took as her definitive residence. In the 1960s, she collaborated with Tito Puente, recording her signature tune "Bemba colorá". In the 1970s, she signed for Fania Records and became strongly associated with the salsa genre, releasing hits such as "Quimbara". She often appeared live with Fania All-Stars and collaborated with Johnny Pacheco and Willie Colón. During the last years of her career, Cruz continued to release successful songs such as "La vida es un carnaval" and "La negra tiene tumbao", and collaborated with Wyclef Jean and Lauryn Hill on "Guantanamera", which was nominated for the Grammy Award for Best Rap Performance By A Duo Or Group.

Her musical legacy is made up of a total of 37 studio albums, as well as numerous live albums and collaborations. Throughout her career, she was awarded numerous prizes and distinctions, including two Grammy Awards and three Latin Grammy Awards. In addition to her prolific career in music, Cruz also made several appearances as an actress in movies and telenovelas. Her catchphrase "¡Azúcar!" ("Sugar!") has become one of the most recognizable symbols of salsa music.

In 2026, Cruz was posthumously inducted into the Rock and Roll Hall of Fame as an early musical influence.

== Early life ==
Celia Caridad Cruz Alfonso was born on 21 October 1925, at 47 Serrano Street in the Santos Suárez neighborhood of Havana, La Habana Province, Cuba. Her father, Simón Cruz, was a railway stoker, and her mother, Catalina Alfonso Ramos, a housewife who took care of an extended family. Celia was one of the eldest among fourteen children living in the house, including cousins and her three siblings, Dolores, Gladys, and Bárbaro, and she used to sing cradle songs to put them to sleep. According to her mother, she began singing as a child at 9 or 10 months of age, often in the middle of the night. She also sang in school during the Fridays' actos cívicos and in her neighborhood ensemble, Botón de oro.

While growing up in Cuba's diverse 1930s musical climate, Cruz listened to many musicians who influenced her adult career, including Fernando Collazo, Abelardo Barroso, Pablo Quevedo, Antonio Arcaño, and Arsenio Rodríguez. Despite her father's opposition and the fact that she was Catholic, as a child Cruz learned toque de santo songs from her neighbor who practiced Santería. Cruz also studied the words to Yoruba songs with colleague Merceditas Valdés (an akpwon, a Santería singer) from Cuba and later made various recordings of this religious genre, even singing backup for other akpwons like Candita Batista.

As a teenager, her aunts, Ana and Agustina Alfonso and took her and her cousins to cabarets to sing, but her father encouraged her to attend school in the hope she would become a teacher. After high school, she attended the Normal School for Teachers in Havana with the intent of becoming a literature teacher. At the time, being a singer was not viewed as an entirely respectable career. However, one of her teachers told her that, as an entertainer, she could earn in one day what most Cuban teachers earned in a month. From 1947, Cruz studied music theory, voice, and piano at Havana's National Conservatory of Music.

One day, her cousin took her to Havana's radio station Radio García-Serra, where she became a contestant in the Hora del té ("Tea Time") amateur radio program. It was her first time using a microphone and she sang the tango "Nostalgia" (as a tribute to Paulina Álvarez), winning a cake as the first prize for her performance. On other occasions she won silver chains, as well as opportunities to participate in more contests. She also sang in other amateur radio programs such as La suprema corte del arte, broadcast by CMQ, always winning first prize. The only exception was when she competed against Vilma Valle, having to split their earnings: 25 dollars each.

In 2004, the Miami Herald revealed from partially declassified US State Department papers that Cruz had been linked to Cuba's pre-Revolution communist party, the Popular Socialist Party (PSP), as early as the 1940s. The article was written by Herald journalist Carol Rosenberg from Freedom of Information Act requests. It made several revelations, among them that the US Embassy in Havana denied Cruz a US visa in 1952 and 1955 because of suspected communist affiliations. The article also states that Cruz had joined the youth wing of the PSP at age 20 and had used a concert to arrange a secret meeting with communists in South America on behalf of its then general secretary, Blas Roca Calderío, who had also founded the party in 1925. Cruz had also signed a public letter in support of one of the Party's front groups, the Pro-Peace Congress. The article states that Cruz's surviving husband, Pedro Knight, was asked about this, and is quoted he knew nothing about it. "She never told me about that. She never talked about politics," the article quotes Knight.

== Career ==
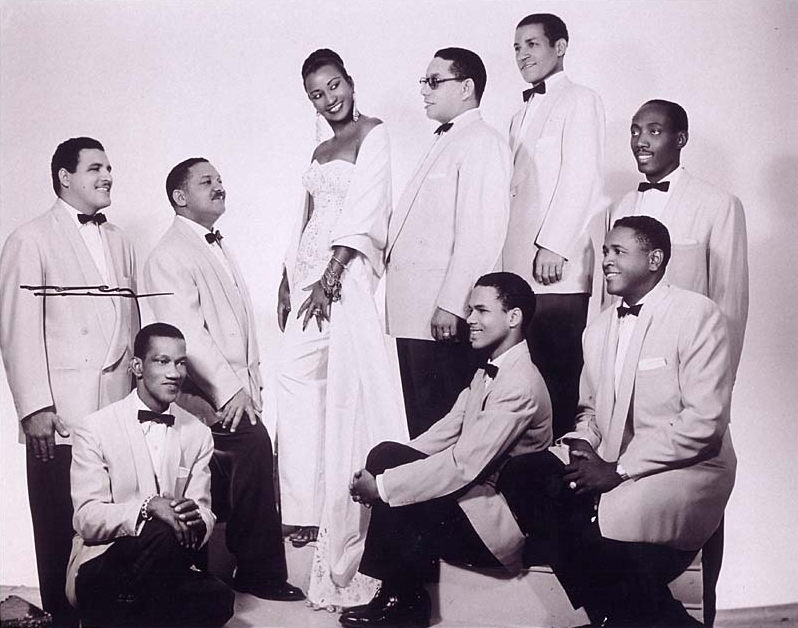
Celia Cruz in the 1950s with the members of the Sonora Matancera in Havana

=== First recordings ===
Isolina Carrillo was one of the first people to recognize Cruz's ability to sing Afro-Cuban music and asked her to join her Conjunto Siboney, where Olga Guillot also sang. She later joined Orquesta de Ernesto Duarte, Gloria Matancera, Sonora Caracas and Orquesta Anacaona. From 1947, she started to sing in Havana's most popular cabarets: Tropicana, Sans Souci, Bamboo, and Topeka, among others. In 1948, Roderico Rodney Neyra founded the group of dancers and singers Las Mulatas de Fuego (The Fiery Mulattas). Cruz was hired with this group as a singer, reaching great success and making presentations in Mexico and Venezuela, where she made her first recordings. Shortly thereafter, Cruz began to sing on musical programs at Radio Cadena Suaritos, along with a group that performed Santería music under the direction of Obdulio Morales. With this group, known as Coro Yoruba y Tambores Batá, she made several recordings that were later released by Panart.

=== Sonora Matancera ===
Cruz's big break came in 1950 when Myrta Silva, the singer with Cuba's Sonora Matancera, returned to her native Puerto Rico. Since they were in need of a new singer, the band decided to give the young Celia Cruz a chance. She auditioned in June, and at the end of July she was asked to join as lead singer, and thus became the group's first black frontwoman. In her first rehearsal with Sonora Matancera, Cruz met her future husband Pedro Knight, who was the band's second trumpeter.

Cruz debuted with the group on 3 August 1950. Initially, Cruz was not received with enthusiasm by the public, but Rogelio Martínez had faith in her. On 15 December 1950, Cruz recorded her first songs with the group, which were a resounding success. Her "musical marriage" with the Sonora Matancera lasted fifteen years. In total Celia recorded 188 songs with the Matancera, including hits such as "Cao cao maní picao", "Mata siguaraya", "Burundanga", and "El yerbero moderno". She won her first gold record for "Burundanga", making her first trip to the United States in 1957 to receive the award and to perform at St. Nicholas Arena, New York. During her 15 years with Sonora Matancera, she appeared in cameos in some Mexican films such as Rincón criollo (1950), Una gallega en La Habana (1955) and Amorcito corazón (1961), toured all over Latin America and became a regular at the Tropicana.

=== Exile and Tico recordings ===
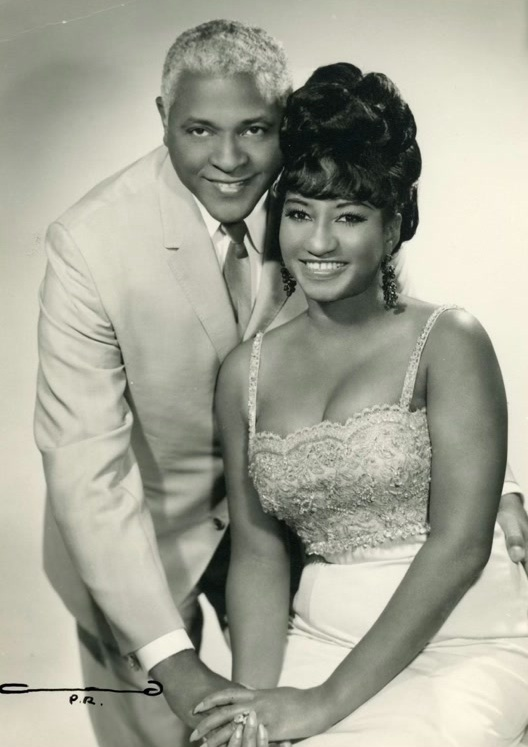
Cruz with her husband Pedro Knight, c. 1962

Cruz was touring in Mexico when Fidel Castro seized power at the conclusion of the Cuban Revolution. She returned to Cuba to find her hometown of Havana in turmoil and mostly shut down. Cruz was publicly critical of Castro, a stance that she knew would endanger her career and possibly her freedom, since other critics of the regime were regularly arrested. She also needed money to pay for her ailing mother's medical expenses, and when she was offered a contract to perform for a few months at La Terraza Nightclub in Mexico City, she accepted. Cruz left Cuba on 15 July 1960 and would not return to her home country until 1990.

On 22 July 1960, just one week after arriving in Mexico, Cruz received the news of the death of her father, Simón Cruz. She requested permission to return and bury her father, but she was denied. In 1961, Cruz and Sonora Matancera left Mexico for an engagement in the United States. During this period, Cruz began performing solo without the group, performing at a recital at the Hollywood Palladium in Los Angeles.

In 1962, before the refusal of the Cuban government to allow her to return to Cuba, Cruz acquired an apartment in Manhattan and later a house in Cambria Heights, Queens. Although she tried to return to Cuba to see her sick mother, who was struggling with terminal bladder cancer, the Cuban government denied her request to return. On 7 April 1962, she received the news of the death of her mother, Catalina Alfonso. That same year, on 14 July, Cruz was married in a civil ceremony to Pedro Knight after a romance of several years. Cruz and Sonora Matancera made their first tour outside of the Americas, visiting Europe and Japan, where they performed with Tito Puente. In 1965, Cruz would culminate a vertiginous fifteen years with the Sonora Matancera. Cruz began a solo career and her husband Pedro Knight decided to leave his position at Sonora Matancera to become her representative, arranger, and personal director. During this time, Cruz became an American citizen.

In 1966, Cruz was contacted by Tito Puente to perform with his orchestra. Their first collaborative album, Son con guaguancó featured a recording of José Claro Fumero's guaracha "Bemba colorá", which became one of Cruz's signature songs. Cruz and Puente went on to collaborate on another four albums together. She also recorded albums with other musical directors such as Memo Salamanca, Juan Bruno Tarraza and Lino Frías for Tico Records. In 1974, Fania Records, the leading salsa record label, acquired Tico and signed Cruz to the imprint Vaya Records, where she remained until 1992.

=== The Fania years ===
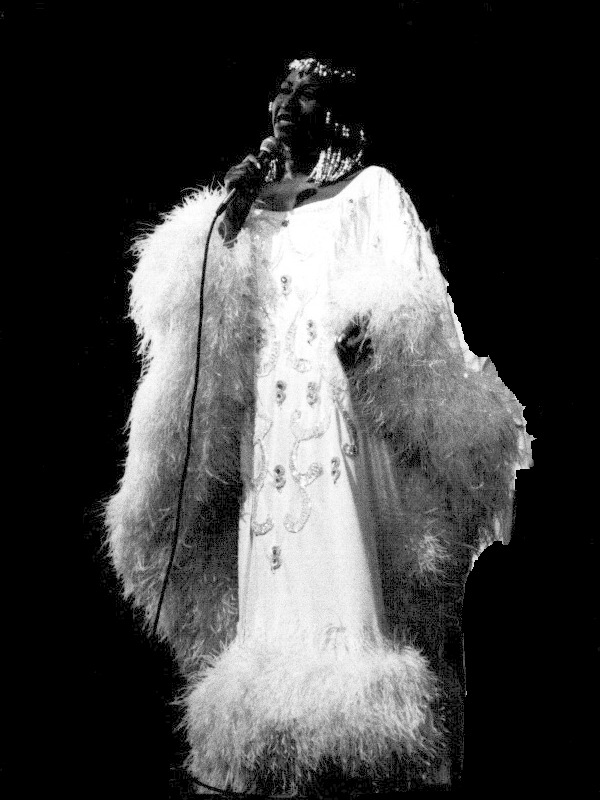
Celia Cruz performing in Paris at the Olympia in 1980

Cruz's association with the Fania label had begun in 1973, when she recorded the lead vocals of "Gracia divina", a song by Larry Harlow which was part of his "Latin opera" Hommy. She then joined the Fania All-Stars, a salsa supergroup featuring the most popular performers of the Fania roster. With them, Cruz first sang "Bemba colorá" and "Diosa del ritmo" in San Juan, Puerto Rico in 1973. She later travelled with the group to Kinshasa, Zaire, in 1974 and returned to San Juan in 1975 for another concert. These live recordings were commercially released years later. Her performance in Zaire, as part of The Rumble in the Jungle event, was included in the film Soul Power.

Cruz recorded her first studio album for Fania in 1974 in collaboration with Johnny Pacheco, the label's founder and musical director. The album, Celia & Johnny, and its lead single, "Quimbara", were both a commercial success. In 1976, she participated in the documentary film Salsa about Latin culture, along with figures like Dolores del Río and Willie Colón. The following year she recorded her first LP with Colón, a collaboration that would be repeated with great success in 1981 and 1987. When touring with Colón, Cruz wore a flamboyant costume, which included various colored wigs, tight sequined dresses, and very high heels. Her fashion style became so famous that one of them was acquired by the Smithsonian institution. In the late 1970s, she participated in an Eastern Air Lines commercial in Puerto Rico, singing the catchy phrase ¡Esto sí es volar! (This is to truly fly!). Cruz also used to sing the identifying spot for WQBA radio station in Miami, formerly known as "La Cubanísima": "I am the voice of Cuba, from this land, far away...I am liberty, I am WQBA, the most Cuban!" (Yo soy de Cuba, la voz, desde esta tierra lejana... ¡soy libertad, soy WQBA, Cubanísima!).

In 1982, Celia was reunited with the Sonora Matancera and recorded the album Feliz Encuentro. That year, the singer received the first tribute of her career at Madison Square Garden in New York. In 1987, Cruz performed a concert in Santa Cruz de Tenerife. That concert was recognized by the publisher of the Guinness Book of Records as the largest free-entry outdoor concert, with an audience of 250,000 people. In 1988, she participated in the feature film Salsa alongside Robby Draco Rosa. In 1990, Cruz won her first Grammy Award (Best Tropical Latin Performance) for her album Ritmo en el corazón, recorded with Ray Barretto. She was also invited to celebrate the 65th anniversary of the Sonora Matancera in Central Park in New York. The decline of Fania's brand of salsa dura in favor of the emergent salsa romántica gradually brought an end to Celia's musical association with the Fania All Stars. Their final reunions took place in Puerto Rico (1994) and Colombia (1995), both of which were released on CD.

=== Later years ===
Dexter Lehtinen, Celia Cruz, Alonso R. del Portillo, Rep. Ileana Ros-Lehtinen, and Pedro Knight in May 1992

In 1990, Cruz and her husband moved to a house in Fort Lee, New Jersey. That year, Cruz managed to return to Cuba. She was invited to make a presentation at the Guantanamo Bay Naval Base. When she came out of this presentation she took a few grams of Cuban soil in a bag; at her request, this bag would later be placed in her coffin when she died. In 1994, she received the National Endowment for the Arts award from the then President Bill Clinton, which is the highest recognition granted by the United States government to an artist. Having made musical presentations in Mexican and Cuban films, in 1992, Celia participated as an actress in the American film Mambo Kings, along with Armand Assante and Antonio Banderas. A year later she made her debut as a television actress in the Mexican telenovela Valentina, along with Verónica Castro for the Televisa network. In 1995, Celia made a guest appearance in the American film The Perez Family, along with Alfred Molina and Anjelica Huston. In 1997, she starred again for Televisa in the Mexican telenovela El alma no tiene color, a remake of the classic Mexican film Angelitos negros. Cruz played the role of a black woman who gives birth to a white daughter. On 25 October 1997, the city of San Francisco, California, officially declared that date as "Celia Cruz Day".

In 1998, she released the album Mi vida es cantar, which featured one of her most successful songs, La vida es un carnaval. In 1999, she performed with Luciano Pavarotti for the Pavarotti and Friends concert. In 2000, Cruz released a new album under the auspices of Sony Music, Celia Cruz and Friends: A Night of Salsa, where she recorded again with Tito Puente, who died shortly after. Thanks to this album, Cruz was awarded her first Latin Grammy. In 2001, the album Siempre viviré won her a second Latin Grammy. In that same year, she performed with Marc Anthony in a tribute to Aretha Franklin for VH1. In 2002, Cruz released the album, La negra tiene tumbao, where she ventured into modern variants of Caribbean rhythms, influenced by rap and hip-hop. For this record she won her third Latin Grammy and her second American Grammy.

On 16 July 2002, Cruz performed to a full house at the free outdoor performing arts festival Central Park SummerStage in New York City. During the performance she sang "Bemba colorá". A live recording of this song was subsequently made available in 2005 on a commemorative CD honoring the festival's then 20-year history entitled, "Central Park SummerStage: Live from the Heart of the City". Cruz appeared on the Dionne Warwick albums Dionne Sings Dionne and My Friends & Me with their Latin duet version of "(Do You Know The Way To) San José".

== Illness and death ==
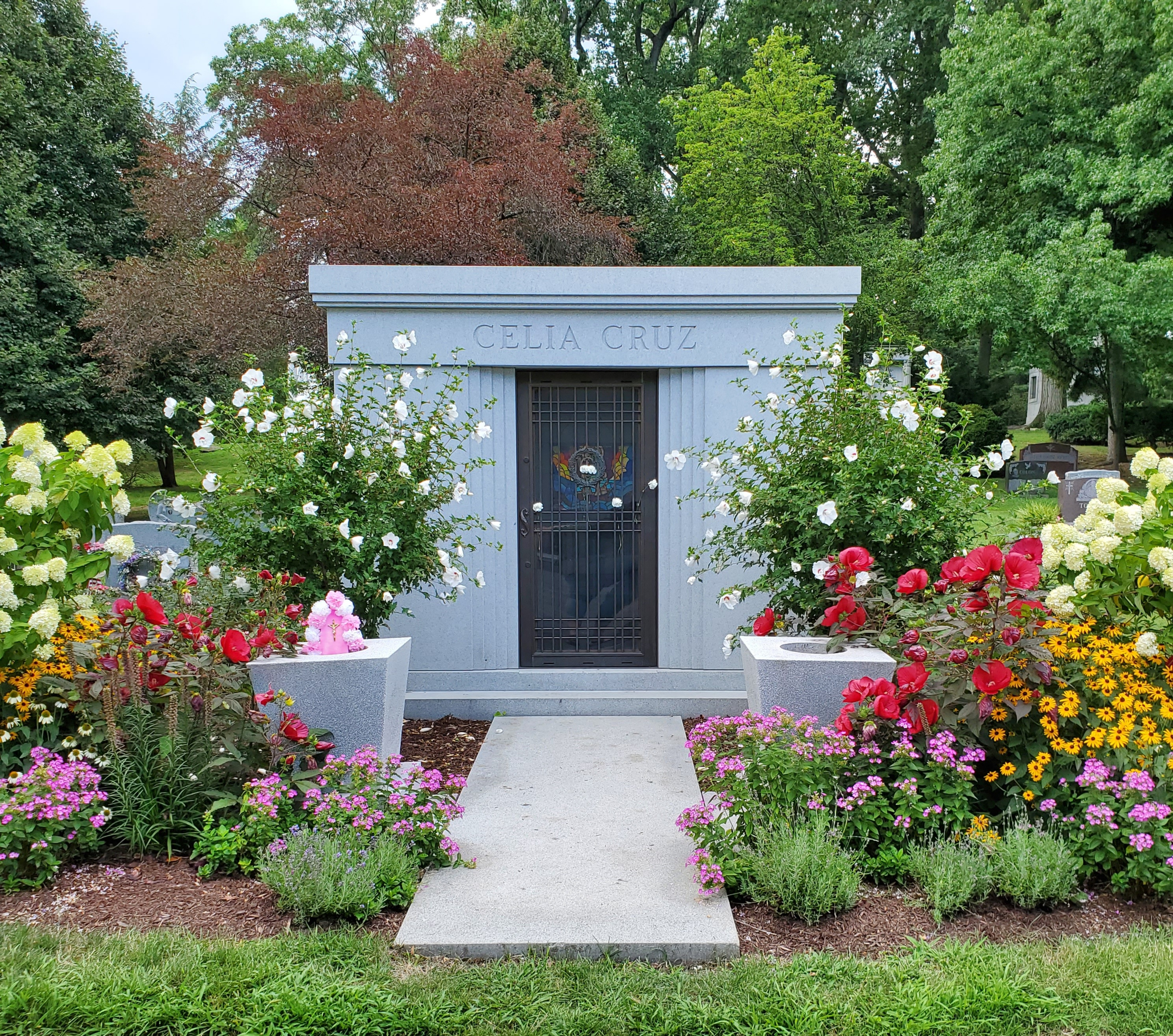
Celia Cruz's mausoleum in Woodlawn Cemetery, Bronx, New York

In March 2002, Cruz announced that she would reduce her international touring after more than five decades of performing around the world. Her representative, Omer Pardillo-Cid, stated that she would limit the prolonged overseas trips that had previously occupied much of her schedule and would instead perform more frequently in the United States.At the time, she was still promoting her recent albums La negra tiene tumbao and Siempre viviré, while also developing a film project in which her life was expected to be portrayed by Whoopi Goldberg.

Despite announcing plans to reduce her international touring earlier that year, Cruz embarked on a European tour in July 2002. The tour began on July 1 with a sold-out performance before more than 5,000 people at the Zénith in Paris and included appearances in cities such as Milan, Venice, Rome, Florence, Amsterdam, Barcelona, Bilbao and Helsinki. In Milan, she shared the stage with Cuban singer Albita before an audience of more than 22,000, while in Barcelona she headlined the Festival de Mulabe. Cruz concluded the tour in Pamplona, Spain, performing during the San Fermín festivities before more than 30,000 people. Following the European tour, she returned to the United States for additional performances.

In the summer of 2002, Cruz was diagnosed with breast cancer after doctors detected an abnormality in one of her breasts. She underwent surgery on August 19 and, approximately one month later, performed in Los Angeles during the Latin Grammy Awards 2002, where she won Best Salsa Album. According to Cruz, the initial procedure was not as successful as expected, and she subsequently underwent a mastectomy on September 25.Despite her illness, Cruz rejected suggestions that she was retiring from music.

Despite her ongoing recovery, Cruz continued to perform. On November 27, 2002 she appeared at the Hipódromo de las Américas in Mexico City. During the performance, she began experiencing difficulty controlling her speech and also fell over the stage. This was her last official show. Days before, she was forced to cancel a planned performance in Guatemala, which would have marked her second appearance in the country. After returning to New York and undergoing further examinations, doctors discovered with a glioma, an aggressive form of brain cancer, and underwent surgery. Cruz opted to have the tumor surgically removed and was admitted to New York Hospital on December 4. The operation, performed the following morning, lasted approximately five and a half hours.

Cruz was discharged on December 16 and returned to her home in New Jersey, where she continued her recovery while undergoing daily radiation therapy. During this period, she issued an open letter thanking the public for its support while requesting privacy regarding her medical treatment. However, during her final months, Cruz’s health continued to deteriorate and she was hospitalized on several occasions. In February 5, 2003, Cruz won four awards at the Premio Lo Nuestro ceremony, although she was unable to attend due to health reasons. Cruz made her first major public appearance following the surgery on February 23, 2003, at the 45th Annual Grammy Awards to receive the award for Best Salsa Album.

During February and March 2003, she finished recording her last album, Regalo del Alma. On March 13, she traveled to Miami Beach for the televised tribute ¡Celia Cruz: Azúcar!, held at the Jackie Gleason Theater and produced by Telemundo. The event featured performances and appearances by numerous Latin artists, including India, Víctor Manuelle, Gilberto Santa Rosa, Gloria Gaynor, Arturo Sandoval, Milly Quezada, José Alberto "El Canario", Willy Chirino and Albita. The trip marked Cruz's first journey outside the New York–New Jersey area since undergoing surgery. On April 3, Cruz made one of her final public performances at the annual Spanish Repertoire Gala at the Plaza Hotel in New York. During the brief appearance, she performed "La vida es un carnaval", followed by "La negra tiene tumbao" and "Bemba colorá". Later that month, she was hospitalized again at NewYork-Presbyterian Hospital after experiencing hypoglycemia, reportedly caused by her ongoing medical treatment. Her representative, Omer Pardillo, stated that she was in stable condition and was not being treated in intensive care.

Cruz was scheduled to participate in the National Puerto Rican Day Parade in New York on June 8, 2003, but was unable to attend on doctor's orders. By this point, her public appearances had become increasingly limited. In early July, false reports of Cruz's death began circulating through a Miami radio program. Her family and representatives publicly denied the reports. Her spokesperson, Blanca Lasalle, described the reports as false and malicious and stated that Cruz remained under medical treatment at her home in New Jersey. According to a report published by El Sentinel on July 5, Cruz had made only three public appearances during 2003. During her last weeks of life, the promotion of her last studio album started with the release of the single "Rie y Llora" to the radio stations.

On the afternoon of 16 July 2003 at 4:55 p.m., Cruz died at her home in Fort Lee, New Jersey, at the age of 77. At her express wish, her mortal remains were first transferred to Miami for two days to receive the homage of her Cuban exile admirers at Gesu Church, before a funeral Mass at St. Patrick's Cathedral and burial in the Woodlawn Cemetery in The Bronx, New York. An epilogue in her autobiography notes that, in accordance with her wishes, Cuban soil - which she had saved from a visit to Guantánamo Bay - was used in her entombment.

== Tributes and legacy ==
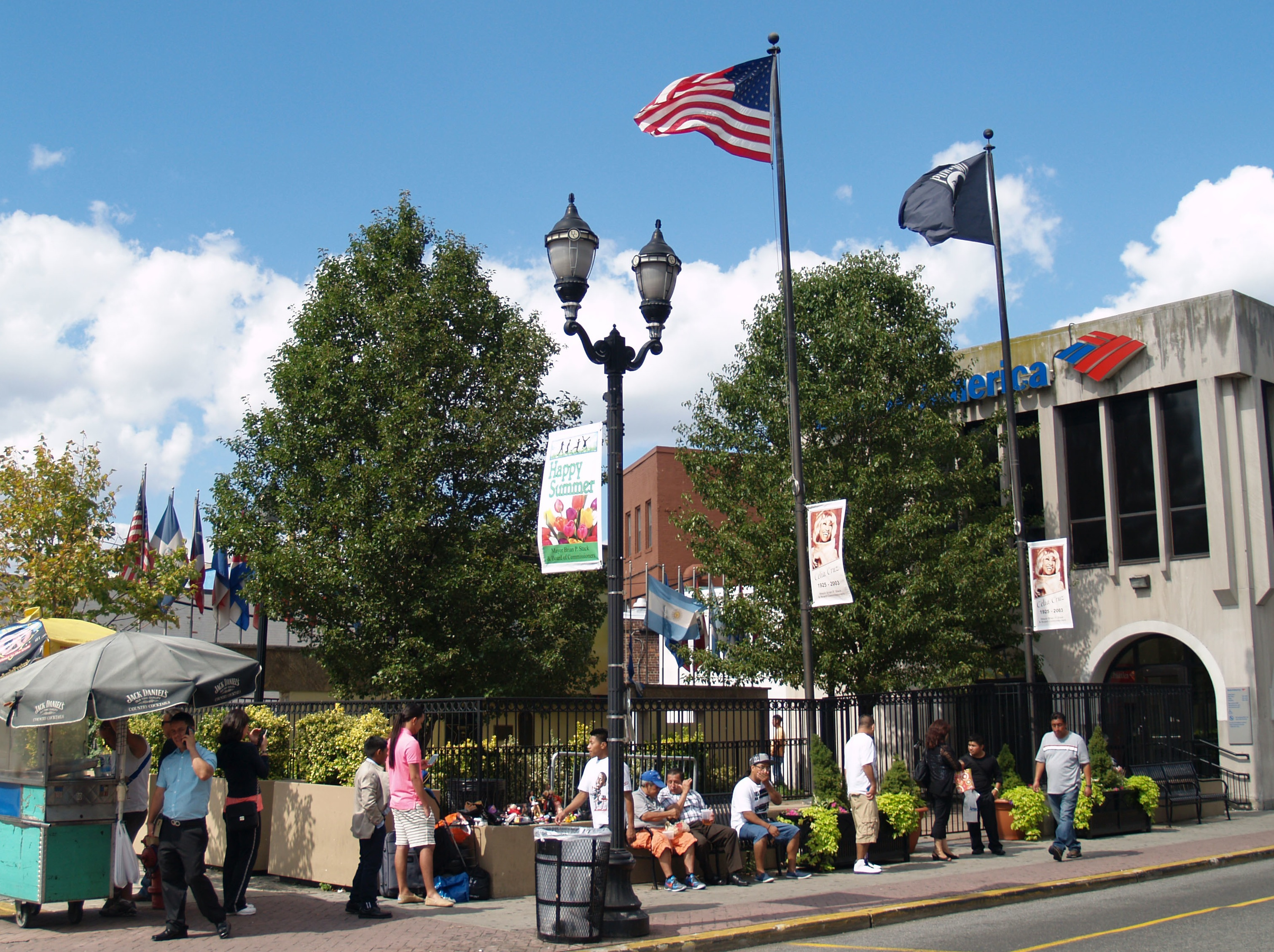
Celia Cruz Plaza in Union City, New Jersey

Cruz's legacy had been honored for years before her death, including a star on the Hollywood Walk of Fame (1987), the asteroid name 5212 Celiacruz (1989), the Excellence Awards at the 1990 Lo Nuestro Awards, and Celia Cruz Way in Miami (1991). She was also recognized with a star on Boulevard Amador Bendayán in Caracas, Venezuela, and a figure in the Hollywood Wax Museum. Besides, Cruz received three Honoris Causa doctorates from three universities in the United States: Yale University, Florida International University and the University of Miami. Cruz, along with fellow Afro-Cuban musician Cachao, were inducted into the Billboard Latin Music Hall of Fame in 1994. She was also inducted into the International Latin Music Hall of Fame in 1999. In the same year, she was presented with the ASCAP Latin Heritage Award becoming the first recipient of the accolade.

Through her work ethic, Cruz rose to great acclaim in her genre. In February 2004, the release of her last album, Regalo del Alma, resulted in Cruz winning a posthumous award at the Premios Lo Nuestro for "best salsa release of the year". It was then announced in December 2005 that a musical titled ¡Azúcar! would open in Tenerife before touring worldwide. The musical's name is derived from Cruz's well-known catch phrase of "¡Azúcar!" (“Sugar!”).

In 2003, a music school was opened in the Bronx, named the Celia Cruz Bronx High School of Music. Pedro Knight visited this school before his death to meet the students and share stories about her life. On June 4, 2004, the heavily Cuban-American community of Union City, New Jersey heralded its annual Cuban Day Parade by dedicating its new Celia Cruz Park (also known as Celia Cruz Plaza), which features a sidewalk star in her honor, at 31st Street and Bergenline Avenue, with Cruz's widower, Pedro Knight, present. There are four other similar dedications to Cruz around the world. Cruz's star has expanded into Union City's "Walk of Fame", as new marble stars are added each spring to honor Latin entertainment and media personalities, such as merengue singer Joseíto Mateo, salsa singer La India, Cachao, Cuban tenor Beny Moré, Tito Puente, Spanish language television news anchor Rafael Pineda, salsa pioneer Johnny Pacheco, singer/bandleader Gilberto Santa Rosa and music promoter Ralph Mercado.

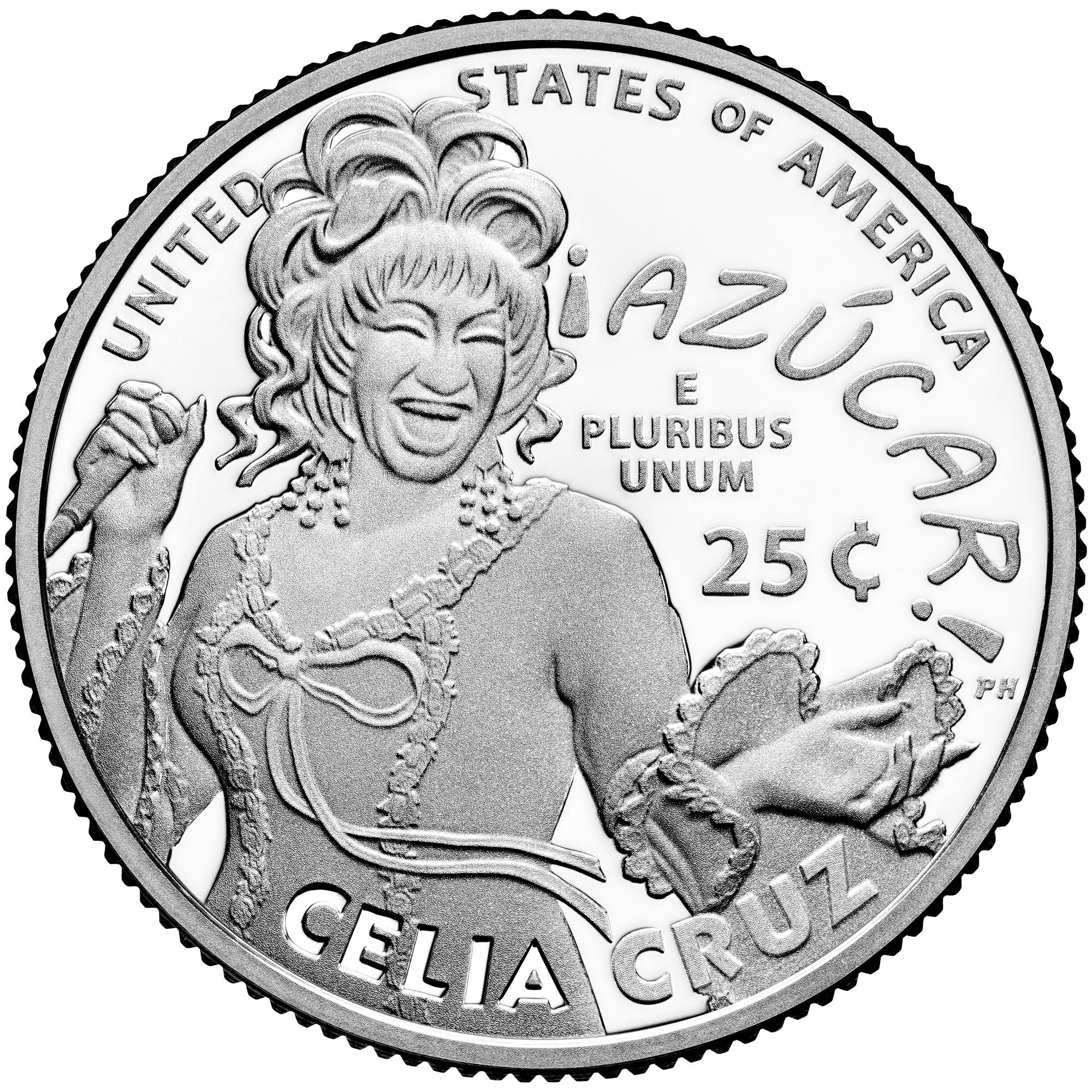
Cruz featured on a 2024 American Women quarter

On 18 May 2005, the National Museum of American History, administered by the Smithsonian Institution and located in Washington, D.C., opened "¡Azúcar!", an exhibit celebrating the life and music of Celia Cruz. The exhibit highlights important moments in Cruz's life and career through photographs, personal documents, costumes, videos, and music. Her biography Celia: Mi vida was also published in 2005, based on more than 500 hours of interviews with the Mexican journalist Ana Cristina Reymundo. The journalist and TV presenter Cristina Saralegui planned to take the story of her life to the cinema and the American actress Whoopi Goldberg, admirer of the singer, expressed her interest in representing her, but the project was cancelled. From 26 September 2007 to 25 May 2008, Celia, a musical based on the life of Celia Cruz, played at the Off-Broadway venue New World Stages. The show won four 2008 HOLA Awards from the Hispanic Organization of Latin Actors.

On 16 March 2011, Celia Cruz was honored by the United States Postal Service with a commemorative postage stamp. The Cruz stamp was one of a group of five stamps honoring Latin music greats, also including Selena, Tito Puente, Carmen Miranda, and Carlos Gardel. The Smithsonian's National Museum of American History collaborated with photographer Robert Weingarten to create an object-based portrait of Celia Cruz featuring artifacts in the museum. The portrait was unveiled on 3 October 2012.

On 21 October 2013, Google honored her with a Google Doodle. Jennifer Lopez honored Cruz with her presentation at the 41st American Music Awards ceremony. The singers Yuri, La India, Maluma and Aymée Nuviola did the same at the Latin American Music Awards. Also in 2013, Cruz was inducted into the New Jersey Hall of Fame. In October 2015, Telemundo premiered an 80-episode docu-drama based on Cruz's life, Celia.

In 2015, the television networks RCN Televisión and Telemundo produced the TV series Celia based on the life of Celia Cruz. Her character was played by the actresses Jeimy Osorio and Aymée Nuviola and counted on the voice of Patty Padilla. In 2019, Angélique Kidjo released a tribute album to Cruz, entitled Celia, including songs spanning all of Cruz's career reinvented with an Afrobeat feel. It features Tony Allen (musician), Meshell Ndegeocello and the Gangbé Brass Band.

In 2018, a monument to Cruz was unveiled in the Cuban Heritage Park in Hialeah, Florida. Also in 2018, the Celia Cruz Estate launched a brand inspired by Cruz which featured merchandise inspired and about Cruz.

In 2019, Chilean-American poet Marjorie Agosin created a chamber music theatre performance titled "Las Magníficas" (The Magnificent Ones), based on the life of Celia Cruz and Chilean singer-songwriter Violeta Parra.

On 2 June 2021, New York City honored Celia Cruz by co-naming the intersection of Reservoir Avenue and East 195th Street in the Kingsbridge Heights section of The Bronx, near the high school that is named in her honor, "Celia Cruz Way". In 2005, Los Angeles named the intersection of Hollywood Boulevard and Argyle Avenue, "Celia Cruz Square," after her.

In 2023, Rolling Stone ranked Cruz at No. 18 on their list of the 200 Greatest Singers of All Time. In February 2023, Cruz was selected as an honoree in the 2024 American Women quarter program, making her the first Afro-Latina to appear on a U.S. quarter.

On 21 October 2025, on what would have been Cruz's 100th birthday, a group of Cuban musicians and the top US representative to the island, Mike Hammer, paid homage to Cruz's legacy at a Catholic church in Havana, after a planned major ceremony at a local music hall was cancelled without explanation by the government, allegedly because of Cruz being fiercely critical of the Castros.

== Discography ==
Cruz recorded with Seeco Records through 1965 and with Tico Records from 1966 through 1972. Later, she recorded with Vaya Records and with its parent company, Fania Records.

- Cuba's Foremost Rhythm Singer (1958)
- Incomparable Celia (1958)
- Mi Diario Musical (1959)
- Con Amor (Exito, 1960)
- Canciones Premiadas (1961)
- Homenaje a Los Santos (1964)
- Canciones que Yo Quería Haber Grabado Primero (1965)
- Sabor y Ritmo de Pueblos (1965)
- Cuba Y Puerto Rico Son (1966)
- Son con Guaguancó (1966)
- Bravo Celia Cruz (1967)
- A Ti México (1967)
- Excitante (1968)
- Serenata Guajira (1968)
- Quimbo Quimbumbia (1969)
- Etc. Etc. Etc. (1970)
- Celia y Tito Puente en España (1971)
- Celia Cruz/Tito Puente Algo Especial Para Recordar (1972)
- Celia & Johnny (1974)
- Tremendo Caché (1975)
- Recordando El Ayer (1976)
- Only They Could Have Made This Album (1977)
- Homenaje A Beny More (1978)
- Celia Cruz Y La Sonora Ponceña La Ceiba (1979)
- Celia/Johnny/Pete (1980)
- Celia & Willie (1981)
- Feliz Encuentro (1982)
- Tremendo Trío (1983)
- Candela (1986)
- De Nuevo (1986)
- Winners (1987)
- Ritmo en el Corazón (1988)
- Guarachera del Mundo (1990)
- Canta Celia Cruz (1991)
- Reina del Ritmo Cubano (1991)
- Tributo a Ismael Rivera (1992)
- Verdadera Historia (1992)
- Azucar Negra (1993)
- Boleros Polydor (1993)
- Homenaje a Beny Moré, Vol. 3 (1993)
- Introducing (1993)
- Guaracheras de La Guaracha (1994)
- Homenaje a Los Santos (1994)
- Irrepetible (1994)
- Mambo del Amor (1994)
- Merengue Saludos Amigos (1994)
- Cuba's Queen of Rhythm (1995)
- Double Dynamite (1995)
- Festejando Navidad (1995)
- Irresistible (1995)
- Celia Cruz Delta (1996)
- Cambiando Ritmos (1997)
- Duets (1997)
- También Boleros (1997)
- Afro-Cubana (1998)
- Mi Vida Es Cantar (1998)
- En Vivo C.M.Q., Vol. 4 (1999)
- En Vivo C.M.Q., Vol. 5 (1999)
- En Vivo Radio Progreso, Vol. 1 (1999)
- En Vivo Radio Progreso, Vol. 2 (1999)
- En Vivo Radio Progreso, Vol. 3 (1999)
- Celia Cruz and Friends: A Night of Salsa (1999)
- Habanera (2000)
- Salsa (2000)
- Siempre Viviré (2000)
- La Negra Tiene Tumbao (2001)
- Hits Mix (2002)
- Unrepeatable (2002)
- Homenaje a Beny Moré (2003)
- Regalo del Alma (2003)
- Dios disfrute a la Reina (2004)
- Havana Nights (2019)

== Filmography ==
- Salón México (Mexico, 1950)
- Una gallega en La Habana (Mexico, 1952)
- ¡Olé... Cuba! (Mexico/Cuba, 1957)
- Affair in Havana (USA/Cuba, 1957)
- Amorcito Corazón (Mexico, 1960)
- Salsa (Documentary, 1976)
- Salsa (USA, 1988)
- "Fires Within" (USA, 1991)
- The Mambo Kings (USA, 1992)
- Valentina (TV) (Mexico, 1993)
- The Perez Family (USA, 1995) Luz Pat
- El alma no tiene color (TV) (Mexico, 1997)
- ¡Celia Cruz: Azúcar! (TV) (Tribute, USA, 2003)
- Soul Power (Documentary of Kinshasa, Zaire Music Festival 1974) (USA, 2008)
- CELIA, Celia Cruz Bio-Drama (2015 on Telemundo)

== Awards ==
=== Grammy Awards ===
The Grammy Awards and Latin Grammy Awards are awarded annually by the National Academy of Recording Arts and Sciences and the Latin Academy of Recording Arts & Sciences respectively. Celia Cruz has received six total awards from twenty one nominations, as well as a non-competitive Lifetime Achievement award.

Year	Category	Nominated work	Result
Grammy Awards
1979	Eternos	Best Latin Recording	Nominated
1983	Tremendo Trío	Best Tropical Latin Recording	Nominated
1985	De Nuevo	Best Tropical Latin Recording	Nominated
1986	Homenaje A Beny More - Vol. III	Best Tropical Latin Recording	Nominated
1987	The Winners	Best Tropical Latin Recording	Nominated
1990	"Ritmo En El Corazón"	Best Tropical Latin Recording	Won
1992	Tributo a Ismael Rivera	Best Tropical Latin Album	Nominated
1993	Azúcar Negra	Best Tropical Latin Album	Nominated
1995	Irrepetible	Best Tropical Latin Performance	Nominated
1997	"Guantanamera"	Best Rap Performance for a Duo or Group	Nominated
1998	Mi Vida Es Cantar	Best Tropical Latin Performance	Nominated
2000	Celia Cruz and Friends: A Night of Salsa	Best Salsa Album	Nominated
2002	La Negra Tiene Tumbao	Best Salsa Album	Nominated
2003	Regalo del Alma	Best Salsa/Merengue Album	Won
2016	Herself	Lifetime Achievement Award	Honored
Latin Grammy Awards
2000	Celia Cruz and Friends: A Night of Salsa	Best Salsa Album	Won
2001	Siempre Viveré	Best Traditional Tropical Album	Won
2002	"La Negra Tiene Tumbao"	Record of the Year	Nominated
2002	"La Negra Tiene Tumbao"	Best Music Video	Nominated
2002	La Negra Tiene Tumbao	Album of the Year	Nominated
2002	La Negra Tiene Tumbao	Best Salsa Album	Won
2004	Regalo del Alma	Best Salsa Album	Won

- Cruz is also the recipient of the president's National Medal of Arts.

== See also ==
- Honorific nicknames in popular music
- Music of Cuba
- History of Cuba
- Pedro Knight - Cruz's musician husband
- List of Afro-Latinos
- List of Cubans
- List of best-selling Latin music artists
