= Ivy Queen discography =

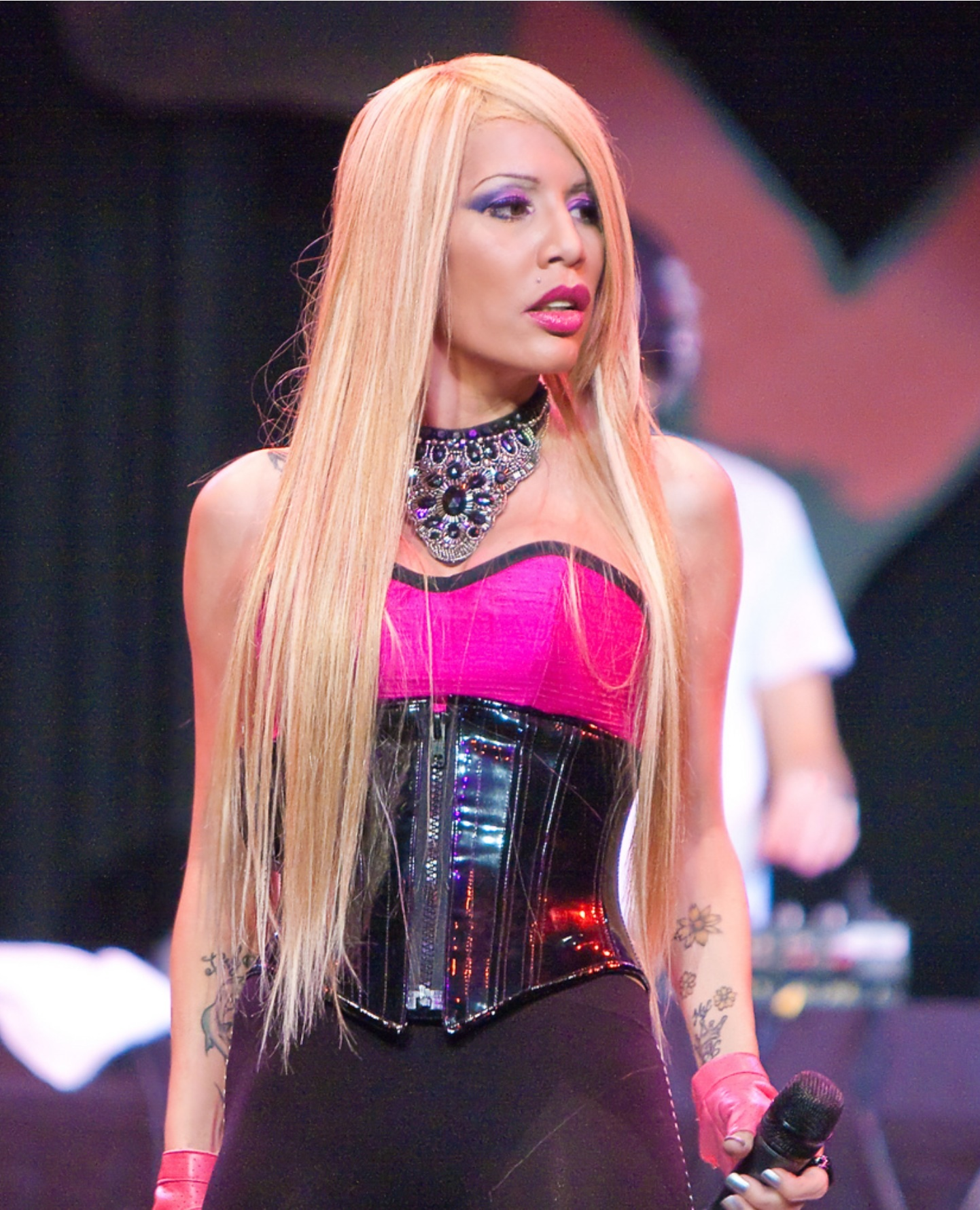
- Ivy Queen performing in 2010
- Studio albums: 10
- Extended plays: 7
- Live albums: 1
- Compilation albums: 4
- Singles: 103
- Music videos: 68

The discography of Ivy Queen, a Puerto Rican rapper and singer, consists of 10 studio albums, four compilation albums, seven EPs, one live album, 103 singles, (including 25 as a featured artist), and 68 music videos.

== Albums ==
=== Studio albums ===
List of studio albums, with selected chart positions and certifications
Title	Album details	Peak chart positions			Sales	Certifications (sales threshold)
Title	Album details	US	US Latin	US Rap	Sales	Certifications (sales threshold)
En Mi Imperio	Released: September 2, 1997; Formats: CD, cassette; Label: House of Music	—	—	—	US: 180,000+	
The Original Rude Girl	Released: December 15, 1998; Formats: CD, cassette; Label: Sony Discos	—	—	—		
Diva	Released: August 23, 2003; Formats: CD, digital download; Label: Real Music Group	—	—	—	US: 10,000+	RIAA: Platinum (Latin)
Real	Released: November 21, 2004; Formats: CD, digital download; Label: Universal Music Latino	—	25	—		
Flashback	Released: October 4, 2005; Formats: CD, digital download; Label: Univision Records	— (Note: Flashback did not enter the Billboard 200, but peaked at number 7 on the Billboard Heatseekers Albums chart.)	10	—	US: 104,000+	RIAA: Platinum (Latin)
Sentimiento	Released: March 27, 2007; Formats: CD, digital download; Label: Univision Records	105	4	24	US: 154,000+; CL: 100,000+	RIAA: Platinum (Latin)
Drama Queen	Released: July 13, 2010; Formats: CD, digital download; Label: Machete Music	163	3	18	US: 25,395	
Musa	Released: August 21, 2012; Formats: CD, digital download; Label: Siente Music	—	15	—		
Vendetta	Released: February 3, 2015; Formats: CD, digital download; Label: Venevision	—	—	—		
Raíz No Rama	Scheduled: TBA; Formats: CD, digital download; Label: NKS Music	—	—	—		

=== Reissues ===
Year	Title	US chart positions						Sales and certifications
Year	Title	Billboard 200	Rap Albums	Latin Albums	Tropical Albums	Latin Rhythm Albums	Reggae Albums	Sales and certifications
2004	Diva Platinum Edition: 1st reissue; Formats: CD, digital download; Label: Universal Music Latino	—	—	24	1	17	4	US sales: 100,000+; RIAA certification: Gold, Platinum
2007	Sentimiento Platinum Edition: 2nd reissue; Formats: CD, digital download; Label: Univision Records	—	—	—	—	—	—	
2010	Drama Queen Deluxe Edition: 3rd reissue; Formats: CD, digital download; Label: Machete Music	—	—	—	—	—	—	

=== Compilations ===
Year	Title	US chart positions				Sales and certifications
Year	Title	Billboard 200	Latin Albums	Tropical Albums	Latin Rhythm Albums	Sales and certifications
2005	The Best of Ivy Queen: 1st compilation album; Formats: CD, digital download	—	55	—	13	
2005	Real Streets: 2nd compilation album; Format: Vinyl	—	—	—	—	
2006	Reggaetón Queen: 3rd compilation album; Formats: CD, digital download	—	—	—	—	
2006	Cosa Nostra: Hip Hop (with Gran Omar): 4th compilation album; Formats: CD, digital download	—	—	—	—	

=== Extended plays (EPs) ===
Year	Title	US chart positions				Sales and certifications
Year	Title	Billboard 200	Latin Albums	Tropical Albums	Latin Rhythm Albums	Sales and certifications
2006	e5: 1st extended play; Format: Digital download	—	—	—	—	
2014	Vendetta: First Round: 2nd extended play; Formats: CD, digital download	—	33	—	5	
2015	Vendetta: Urban: 3rd extended play; Formats: CD, digital download	—	—	—	8	
2015	Vendetta: Hip Hop: 4th extended play; Formats: CD, digital download	—	—	—	9	
2015	Vendetta: Bachata: 5th extended play; Formats: CD, digital download	—	—	6	—	
2015	Vendetta: Salsa: 6th extended play; Formats: CD, digital download	—	—	17	—	
2019	Llego La Queen: 7th extended play; Formats: Digital download	—	— (Note: Llego La Queen did not enter the Billboard Latin Albums chart, but peaked at number 13 on the Billboard Latin Album Sales chart.)	—	—	
2020	The Way of Queen: 8th extended play; Format: Digital download	—	—	—	—	

=== Live ===
Year	Title	US chart positions				Sales and certifications
Year	Title	Billboard 200	Latin Albums	Tropical Albums	Latin Rhythm Albums	Sales and certifications
2008	Ivy Queen 2008 World Tour LIVE!: 1st live album; Formats: CD, digital download	—	72	—	7	

=== Chart accomplishments ===
Chart accomplishments	Chart			
Chart accomplishments	Billboard 200	Latin Albums	Tropical Albums	Latin Rhythm Albums
Entries	2	9	4	11
Number-one albums	0	0	1	2
Top-ten albums	0	3	3	8

== Singles ==
=== 1990s ===
Year	Single	US Chart positions					Album
Year	Single	Hot 100	Latin Songs	Tropical Songs	Latin Rhythm Songs	Latin Pop Songs	Album
1997	"Como Mujer"	—	—	—	—	—	En Mi Imperio
1997	"Pongan Atención"	—	—	—	—	—	En Mi Imperio
1999	"In The Zone" (featuring Wyclef Jean)	— (Note: "In the Zone" did not enter the Billboard Hot 100, but peaked at number 38 on the Rhythmic Songs chart.)	—	—	—	—	The Original Rude Girl
1999	"Ritmo Latino" (featuring Victor Vergas and WepaMan)	—	—	—	—	—	The Original Rude Girl

=== 2000s ===
Year	Single	Chart positions					Album
Year	Single	Hot 100	Latin Songs	Tropical Songs	Latin Rhythm Songs	Latin Pop Songs	Album
2003	"Quiero Bailar"	—	29	16	8	—	Diva
2004	"Quiero Saber" (featuring Gran Omar)	—	—	—	—	—	Diva
2004	"Papi Te Quiero"	—	—	—	—	—	Diva
2004	"Tuya Soy"	—	—	—	—	—	Diva
2004	"Guillaera" (featuring Gran Omar)	—	—	—	—	—	Diva
2004	"Tu No Puedes"	—	—	—	—	—	Diva
2004	"Súbelo"	—	—	—	—	—	Diva
2004	"Chika Ideal"	—	—	—	—	—	Real
2004	"Rociarlos" (featuring Héctor el Father and Gran Omar)	—	—	—	—	—	Real
2004	"Dile"	—	—	8	—	—	Real
2005	"Angel Caído"	—	—	—	—	—	Real
2005	"Cuéntale"	— (Note: "Cuéntale" did not enter the Billboard 100, but peaked at number 14 on the Billboard Bubbling Under Hot 100 chart. It also peaked at number 83 on the Billboard Radio Songs chart, the Hot 100’s airplay chart.)	3	1	4	—	Flashback
2005	"Te He Querido, Te He Llorado"	—	10	23	6	26	Flashback
2006	"Libertad"	—	13	12	9	—	Flashback
2006	"Nuestro Himno" (with Andy Andy, Autoridad de la Sierra, Aventura, Wyclef Jean, Kalimba, Kany, LDA, N Klabe, Patrulla 81, Pitbull, Ponce Carlos, Rayito, Reik, Frank Reyes, Tony Sunshine, Olga Tañon, Gloria Trevi, Voz a Voz and Yemaya)	—	—	—	—	—	Somos Americanos
2007	"Que Lloren"	—	10	4	2	—	Sentimiento
2007	"En Que Fallamos"	—	44	15	14	—	Sentimiento
2007	"Sentimientos"	—	—	—	22	—	Sentimiento
2007	"Menor Que Yo"	—	—	—	25	—	Sentimiento Platinum Edition
2008	"Dime"	—	8	4	1	33	Ivy Queen 2008 World Tour LIVE!
2009	"La Velita" (with Arcángel, Zion and Jadiel)	—	—	—	—	—	Golpe de Estado
2009	"Permanent" (with Cosculluela)	—	—	—	—	—	Non-album single

=== 2010s ===
Year	Single	Chart positions					Album
Year	Single	Hot 100	Latin Songs	Tropical Songs	Latin Rhythm Songs	Latin Pop Songs	Album
2010	"La Vida Es Así"	—	11	7	1	10	Drama Queen
2010	"Amor Puro"	—	—	—	—	—	Drama Queen
2012	"Peligro De Extinción"	—	—	84	18	—	Musa
2012	"Vamos A Celebrar" (with Victoria Sanabria)	—	—	—	—	—	Non-album single
2013	"Cupido"	—	—	—	—	—	Musa
2014	"Cuando Las Mujeres"	—	—	—	—	—	Musa
2014	"No Hay" (Solo or featuring J Alvarez)	—	—	—	23	—	Musa
2015	"Soy Libre"	—	—	—	—	—	Vendetta
2015	"Vamos A Guerrear" (featuring Ñengo Flow)	—	—	—	—	—	Vendetta
2015	"Nací Para Amarte" (featuring Jowell & Randy)	—	—	—	—	—	Vendetta
2015	"Vendetta"	—	—	—	—	—	Vendetta
2016	"Que Se Jodan"	—	—	—	—	—	Non-album single
2017	"Ámame o Mátame" (featuring Don Omar)	—	48	—	19	—	Non-album single
2017	"La Playa" (Remix) (with Kafu Banton and Keko Musik)	—	—	—	—	—	Non-album single
2017	"El Lobo Del Cuento"	—	—	—	—	—	Non-album single
2017	"No Pueden Pararme"	—	—	—	—	—	Non-album single
2018	"Sé Qué Tú Quieres"	—	—	—	—	—	Kilates, Vol. 3: The Reggaeton Triology
2018	"Por Mí"	—	—	—	—	—	Non-album single
2018	"Mí Vecina"	—	—	—	—	—	Non-album single
2018	"A Forgotten Spot (Olvidado)" (with Lin-Manuel Miranda, Zion & Lennox, De La Ghetto, PJ Sin Suela and Lucecita Benitez)	—	— (Note: "A Forgotten Spot (Olvidado)" did not enter the Billboard Latin Songs chart, but peaked at number 13 on the Billboard Latin Digital Songs chart.)	—	— (Note: "A Forgotten Spot (Olvidado)" did not enter the Billboard Latin Rhythm Songs chart, but peaked at number 12 on the Billboard Latin Rhythm Digital Songs chart.)	—	Non-album single
2019	"Pa’l Frente y Pa’Trás"	—	—	—	—	—	Llego La Queen
2019	"Yo Quiero Bailar"	—	—	—	—	—	Non-album single
2019	"Melaza y Candela" (with Mela Melaza)	—	—	—	—	—	Non-album single
2019	"787"	—	41	—	23	—	Non-album single
2019	"La Roca"	—	—	— (Note: "La Roca" did not enter the Billboard Tropical Songs chart, but peaked at number 9 on the Billboard Tropical Digital Songs chart.)	—	—	The Way of Queen

=== 2020s ===
Year	Single	Chart positions					Album
Year	Single	Hot 100	Latin Songs	Tropical Songs	Latin Rhythm Songs	Latin Pop Songs	Album
2020	"Un Baile Más"	—	33	—	20	—	The Way of Queen
2020	"Peligrosa"	—	42	—	21	—	Non-album single
2020	"Antídoto"	—	—	—	—	—	Non-album single
2020	"Next"	—	— (Note: "Next" did not enter the Billboard Latin Songs chart, but peaked at number 19 on the Billboard Latin Digital Songs chart.)	—	24	—	Non-album single
2020	"Yo Perreo Sola" (Remix) (with Bad Bunny and Nesi)	—	—	—	—	—	Non-album single
2021	"Lil Havana" (Remix) (with Fredo Versatil)	—	—	—	—	—	Non-album single
2021	"Camuflaje"	—	—	—	—	—	Non-album single
2022	"Pa' Mí" (with Peter Nieto)	—	—	19	—	—	Non-album single
2022	"Quien Dijo"	—	—	17	—	—	Non-album single
2022	"Villana"	—	—	—	—	—	Non-album single
2022	"Bye Bye"	—	—	—	—	—	Non-album single
2022	"Ya Te Olvidé" (with Arthur Hanlon)	—	—	—	—	—	Piano & Mujer, Vol. 2
2022	"Calentura"	—	—	—	—	—	Non-album single
2023	"Toma"	—	—	—	—	—	Non-album single
2023	"Toma" (Remix) (featuring Lennox, Brray, Marconi Impara & Eix)	—	—	—	—	—	Non-album single
2024	"Primer Aviso" (with Maria Becerra)	— (Note: "Primer Aviso" did not enter the main Hot 100 but peaked on the Argentina Hot 100 at number 10.)	—	—	—	—	Non-album single
2024	"Perdió" (with Bad Gyal)	—	—	—	—	—	Non-album single
2024	"De Luto"	—	—	—	—	—	TBA
2025	"Coincidimos" (with Nanpa Basico)	—	—	—	—	—	TBA
2025	"Championa"	—	—	—	—	—	TBA
2025	"11:11"	—	—	—	—	—	TBA
2026	"Flow de Revista"	—	—	—	—	—	TBA
2026	"Cria y Calle" (with Boy Wonder and Charlee Way)	—	—	—	15	—	La Liga Femenina
2026	"Hasta Abajo" (with Wisin)	—	—	—	—	—	La Universidad del Perreo

=== Promotional singles and other charted songs ===
Title	Year	Peak chart positions				Certifications	Album
Title	Year	US LATIN	US RHYTHM	US TROPICAL	US POP	Certifications	Album
"No Hacen Na"	2006	—	25	30	—		Cosa Nostra: Hip Hop
"Pobre Corazon"	2007	45	37	36	24		Sentimiento
"Dime Si Recuerdas"	2007	—	35	20	—		Sentimiento Platinum Edition
"Acércate" (featuring Wisin & Yandel)	2010	—	— (Note: "Acércate" did not enter the Billboard Latin Rhythm Songs chart, but peaked at number 16 on the Billboard Latin Rhythm Digital Songs chart.)	—	—		Drama Queen
"Te Sirvo De Abrigo" (featuring Farruko)	2015	—	23	—	—		Vendetta
"Leyendas" (Karol G, Wisin & Yandel and Nicky Jam featuring Ivy Queen, Zion and Alberto Stylee	2021	— (Note: "Leyendas" did not enter the Billboard Latin Songs chart, but peaked at number 7 on the Billboard Latin Digital Songs chart.)	— (Note: "Leyendas" did not enter the Billboard Latin Rhythm Songs chart, but peaked at number 4 on the Billboard Latin Rhythm Digital Songs chart.)	—	—	AMPROFON: Gold; RIAA: Platinum (Latin)	KG016

=== As featured performer ===
Year	Single	Peak chart positions						Album
Year	Single	US LATIN	US TROPICAL	US LATIN POP	US HIP HOP & R&B	FRA	MX	Album
1997	"Se Necesita Un Milagro" (Domingo Quiñones featuring Ivy Queen)	28	8	—	—	—	—	Se Necesita Un Milagro
1997	"Magdalena, Mi Amor (Quimbara)" (Dark Latin Groove featuring Ivy Queen)	—	— (Note: "Magdalena, Mi Amor (Quimbara)" did not enter the Billboard Tropical Songs chart, but peaked at number 25 on the Billboard Tropical Digital Songs chart.)	—	—	—	—	Swing On
1998	"Jerigonza" (Dayanara Torres featuring Ivy Queen)	17	6	5	—	—	—	Antifaz
1999	"Solo Palabras" (George LaMond featuring Ivy Queen)	—	—	—	—	—	—	Non-album single
2004	"12 Discípulos" (Eddie Dee featuring Daddy Yankee, Ivy Queen, Tego Calderón, Julio Voltio, Vico C, Zion, Lennox, Nicky Jam, Johnny Prez, Gallego, and Wiso G)	—	8	—	—	—	—	12 Discípulos
2004	"Dat Sexy Body" (Remix) (Sasha featuring Ivy Queen)	—	—	—	78	31	—	Non-album single
2004	"Vamo Alla" (Trivales featuring Ivy Queen)	—	—	—	—	—	—	Entrando Al Juego
2005	"Echale" (Vico C featuring Ivy Queen)	—	—	—	—	—	—	Desahogo
2005	"Ladies Night" (Nina Sky featuring Ivy Queen)	—	—	—	—	—	—	La Conexion
2005	"Saca La Semilla" (Tony Touch featuring Gran Omar and Ivy Queen)	—	—	—	—	—	—	The ReggaeTony Album
2005	"Culo" (Remix) (Pitbull featuring Lil Jon and Ivy Queen)	—	—	—	—	—	—	Money Is Still a Major Issue
2006	"Hit Lerele" (Beatriz Luengo featuring Ivy Queen)	—	—	—	—	14	—	Beatriz Luengo
2007	"Noche de Entierro (Nuestro Amor)" (Remix) (Luny Tunes & Tainy featuring Daddy Yankee, Wisin & Yandel, Héctor el Father, Ivy Queen, Jowell & Randy, Tony Tun Tun and Arcángel & De La Ghetto)	—	—	—	—	—	—	Non-album single
2007	"Lo Nuestro Se Fue" (Luny Tunes & Tainy featuring Daddy Yankee, Wisin & Yandel, Ivy Queen and Alex Rivera)	—	—	—	—	—	—	Los Benjamins: La Continuación
2007	"Sí No Eres Tú" (Mikey Perfecto featuring Ivy Queen)	—	—	—	—	—	—	Cuando El Silencio Hace Ruido
2008	"Te Regalo Amores" (Remix) (R.K.M & Ken-Y featuring Ivy Queen)	—	—	—	—	—	—	The Royalty: La Realeza
2009	"Juquia Con El Alcohol" (Remix) (Jadiel featuring Ivy Queen, Arcángel, Wibal and Alex & Kenai)	—	—	—	—	—	—	Non-album single
2009	"No Te Quiero" (Victoria Sanabría featuring Ivy Queen)	—	—	—	—	—	—	Criollo Con Salsa
2010	"Se Va Conmigo" (Remix) (Carlos Arroyo featuring Ivy Queen)	—	—	—	—	—	—	Non-album single
2010	"Quiere Pa Que Te Quieran" (Remix) (Dyland & Lenny featuring Ivy Queen)	—	—	—	—	—	—	Non-album single
2011	"Amantes o Amigos" (Remix) (Khriz John featuring Ivy Queen)	—	—	—	—	—	—	El Repretorio - The Mixtape
2011	"Dándole" (Remix) (Gocho featuring Jowell featuring Ivy Queen)	—	—	—	—	—	—	Mi Musica
2011	"Despierto Soñando" (Gotay "El Autentiko" featuring Ñengo Flow and Ivy Queen)	—	—	—	—	—	—	El Autentiko, Vol. 2
2013	"Dime" (Remix) (MC Ceja featuring Ivy Queen)	—	—	—	—	—	—	Como Antes
2016	"Las Qué Se Ponen Bien La Falda" (María José featuring Ivy Queen)	—	27	—	—	—	5	Habla Ahora

- On January 12, 2017, Billboard updated its methodology for the Tropical Songs chart to exclude any songs that do not fit in the tropical music category.

=== Chart accomplishments ===
Chart accomplishments	Chart			
Chart accomplishments	Latin Songs	Tropical Songs	Latin Rhythm Songs	Latin Pop Songs
Entries	15	19	22	5
Number-one singles	0	1	2	0
Top-ten singles	5	8	7	2

== Album appearances ==
=== 1990s ===
Year	Title	Artist	Album
1995	"Ahí Vienen"	DJ Joe	Underground Masters, Vol. 2
1995	"La Melaza"	DJ Joe	Underground Masters, Vol. 2
1995	"Coming Back"	Various Artists	The Cream, Vol. 1
1995	"Muchos Quieren Tumbarme"	The Noise	The Noise 5: Back To The Top
1995	"Other Side"	DJ Black	Simply Black, Vol. 1
1995	"Phat Beats"	Various Artists	Nuvo Reggae Festival, Vol. 1
1996	"Ivy Queen"	DJ Dynamite	Sonido Bestial
1996	"Kill Dem By Law"	DJ Chiclin	Los Mas Buscados
1996	"Para El Piso Es Que Vas"	DJ Karlos	In Tha Kasa
1996	"He Regresado"	The Noise	The Noise 6: The Creation
1996	"Reggae Respect"	The Noise	The Noise 6: The Creation
1996	"Guerra"	DJ Joe	Todo Como Antes
1996	"Somos Cantantes" (Memo & Vale featuring Ivy Queen, Baby Rasta & Gringo and Ruff Society)	Memo & Vale	Sueños de Destrucción
1997	"Al Escuchar Mi Coro"	The Noise	The Noise 7: Bring The Noise
1997	"No Te Vayas" (with Ruff Society)	The Noise	The Noise 7: Bring The Noise
1997	"Magdalena, Mi Amor (Quimbara)" (Dark Latin Groove featuring Ivy Queen)	Dark Latin Groove	Swing On
1997	"Se Necesita Un Milagro" (Domingo Quiñones featuring Ivy Queen)	Domingo Quiñones	Se Necesita Un Milagro
1997	"Soy La Queen"	DJ Joe	El Escuadron Del Panico
1998	"En Primera Fila"	DJ Dynamite	Da King, Vol. 3
1998	"Jerigonza" (Dayanara Torres featuring Ivy Queen)	Dayanara Torres	Antifaz
1998	"No Me Dejo Llevar" (with Eddie Dee, Daddy Yankee, Nicky Jam, Alberto Stylo, Rey Pirin and Maicol & Manuel)	El Bando Korrupto	No Creemos En Nadie
1998	"Porque Te Amo (Tu Quieres Mas)" (with Robby Salinas)	Various Artists	Union Tropical
1999	"Solo Palabras"	George LaMond	Entrega

=== 2000s ===
Year	Title	Artist	Album
2000	"Hoy Voy Al Party"	DJ Nelson	The Flow: Sweet Dreams
2000	"P.R. All Stars" (Tony Touch featuring Don Chezina, Daddy Yankee, Ivy Queen, Mexicano 777 and Rey Pirin)	Tony Touch	The Piece Maker
2001	"Boricua's State of Mind" (MC Ceja featuring Ivy Queen, Gran Omar and Bimbo)	MC Ceja	Boricua's State of Mind
2001	"El Me Mintió"	Various Artists	Boricua N.Y. 2
2001	"El Perreo"	DJ Darwin	Darwin's The Music, Vol. 2
2001	"Miles De Voces"	Various Artists	Buddha's Family
2002	"En La Disco"	Various Artists	Escorpiones
2002	"Let's Ride" (Getto & Gastam featuring Ivy Queen)	Getto & Gastam	Vida Eterna
2002	"Llora Mi Corazón"	Baby Rasta & Gringo	Romances Del Ruido 2
2002	"Reggae Mix"	DJ Playero	Playero 42
2002	"Yo Quiero Bailar"	Various Artists	The Majestic, Vol. 1
2002	"Yo Quiero Saber"	Various Artists	Kilates, Vol. 1: Rompiendo El Silencio
2003	"Dime" (with Gran Omar)	Various Artists	Desafio
2003	"La Abusadora"	Various Artists	Kilates, Vol. 2: Segundo Impacto
2003	"La Otra"	Various Artists	Sopranos: First Season
2003	"Pégate Al Perreo"	DJ Frank	Time 2 Kill
2004	"Amandote Asi" (Mikey Perfecto featuring Ivy Queen)	Mikey Perfecto	Evolucion Arrestada
2004	"Amiga No Pienses" (Reggaeton Version)	Noriega	Contra La Corriente
2004	"Amiga No Pienses" (Salsa Version)	Noriega	Contra La Corriente
2004	"Cuando Mi Perra"	DJ Nelson	Flow la Discoteka
2004	"Dat Sexy Body" (Remix) (Sasha featuring Ivy Queen)	Various Artists	Reggae Gold 2004
2004	"Echale" (Vico C featuring Ivy Queen)	Vico C	Desahogo
2004	"Eres Mi Hombre"	Various Artists	Reggaeton Biggest Hits
2004	"Estilo y Flow" (Bimbo featuring Ivy Queen)	Various Artists	Flow Callejero
2004	"La Sicaria" (Ivy Queen featuring Gran Omar)	Various Artists	The Majestic: Segundo Imperio
2004	"12 Discipulos" (Eddie Dee featuring Daddy Yankee, Ivy Queen, Tego Calderón, Julio Voltio, Vico C, Zion, Lennox, Nicky Jam, Johnny Prez, Gallego, and Wiso G)	Eddie Dee	12 Discipulos
2004	"Que Es La Que Hay"	Eddie Dee	12 Discipulos
2004	"No Te Metas"	Various Artists	Sopranos 2: Bad Fellas
2004	"Vamo Allá" (Trivales featuring Ivy Queen)	Trivales	Entrando Al Juego
2005	"Intro" (with MC Ceja, Getto & Gastam and Gallego)	Various Artists	Buddha's Family 2: Desde La Prisión
2005	"Ando Con Mi Corillo"	Various Artists	Buddha's Family 2: Desde La Prisión
2005	"Contigo"	Various Artists	Reggaeton Heavy Hitters
2005	"Culo" (Remix) (with Pitbull and Lil Jon)	Pitbull	Money Is Still a Major Issue
2005	"Dale Pai"	Various Artists	Los Cazadores: Primera Busqueda
2005	"Freestyle"	DJ Camilo	Light's Out Reggaeton
2005	"Habran Paso"	Various Artists	Reggaetón 2005
2005	"La Abusadora"	Various Artists	Kilates, Vol. 2: Segundo Impacto
2005	"Ladies Night" (Nina Sky featuring Ivy Queen)	Nina Sky	La Conexión
2005	"Madre No Llores" (Mexicano 777 featuring Ivy Queen)	Mexicano 777	1972
2005	"Millón en Maleta" (Japanese featuring Ivy Queen)	Japanese	Don Victor Corleone
2005	"Perdona Amiga"	Various Artists	30 Reggaeton Superhits
2005	"Saca La Semilla" (Tony Touch featuring Ivy Queen and Gran Omar)	Tony Touch	The ReggaeTony Album
2005	"Según Tú"	Don Omar	Los Bandoleros
2005	"Te He Querido, Te He Llorado"	Luny Tunes & Baby Ranks	Mas Flow 2
2005	"Quitate Tu Pa Ponerme Yo" (Eddie Dee featuring Daddy Yankee, Ivy Queen, Tego Calderón, Julio Voltio, Vico C, Zion, Lennox, Nicky Jam, Johnny Prez, Gallego, and Wiso G)	Eddie Dee	12 Discipulos: Special Edition
2006	"Agarra El Perreo"	Various Artists	Los Mejores del Reggaeton 2006
2006	"Bilingual" (Remy Ma featuring Ivy Queen)	Remy Ma	There's Something About Remy: Based on a True Story
2006	"Cuando Hieres A Una Mujer" (La India featuring Ivy Queen)	La India	Soy Diferente
2006	"En La Disco"	Various Artists	Escorpiones
2006	"Estamos Ready"	Various Artists	Non Stop Reggaeton Hits
2006	"Hit Lerele" with Beatriz Luengo	Beatriz Luengo	Beatriz Luengo
2006	"Mi Corazón"	Various Artists	Los Sandungueros
2006	"Nuestro Himno" (with Andy Andy, Autoridad de la Sierra, Aventura, Wyclef Jean, Kalimba, Kany, LDA, N Klabe, Patrulla 81, Pitbull, Ponce Carlos, Rayito, Reik, Frank Reyes, Tony Sunshine, Olga Tañon, Gloria Trevi, Voz a Voz and Yemaya)	Various Artists	Somos Americanos
2006	"Te He Querido, Te He Llorado" (Remix) (Ednita Nazario featuring Ivy Queen)	Ednita Nazario	Apasionada Live
2006	"Tienes A Otra" (N.O.R.E. featuring Ivy Queen and Big Mato)	N.O.R.E.	N.O.R.E. y la Familia...Ya Tú Sabe
2006	"Tu Reina Soy Yo"	Noriega	Sin Control
2007	"Dale Azota" (Tony Touch featuring Ivy Queen)	MC Ceja	ReggaeTony 2
2007	"Deja La Perce"	Various Artists	Millennium
2007	"Lo Nuestro Se Fue" (with Daddy Yankee, Wisin and Alex Rivera)	Luny Tunes & Tainy	Mas Flow: Los Benjamins — La Continuación
2007	"Se Desvive Por Ella" (Remix) (La Sista featuring Jadiel and Ivy Queen)	La Sista	Los Rompecorazones, Vol. 1: Teorías del Amor
2007	"Si No Eres Tu" (Mikey Perfecto featuring Ivy Queen)	Mikey Perfecto	Cuando El Silencio Hace Ruido
2008	"Mala" (Remix) (Yolandita Monge featuring Ivy Queen)	Yolandita Monge	Mala
2008	"Te Regalo Amores" (Remix) (R.K.M & Ken-Y featuring Ivy Queen)	R.K.M & Ken-Y	The Royalty: La Realeza
2009	"Como Te Ha Ido" (Naldo featuring Ivy Queen)	Naldo	Lágrimas De Sangre
2009	"No Te Quiero" (Victoria Sanabría featuring Ivy Queen)	Victoria Sanabria	Criollo Con Salsa
2009	"Perfecto" (Wisin & Yandel featuring Ivy Queen and Yaviah)	Wisin & Yandel	La Revolución
2009	"Warriors" (Cosculluela featuring Ivy Queen and O'Niell)	Cosculluela	El Príncipe

=== 2010s ===
Year	Title	Artist	Album
2010	"La Velita" (with Arcángel, Zion and Jadiel)	Various Artists	Golpe de Estado
2010	"El Recuerdo"	Various Artists	Golpe de Estado
2011	"Despierto Sonando" (Gotay "El Auténtico" featuring Ivy Queen and Nengo Flow)	Gotay "El Auténtico"	El Auténtico, Vol. 2
2012	"El Gato Que Quiero"	Nico Canada	A Lo Under, Vol. 1: Perreo
2013	"Dime" (Remix) (MC Ceja featuring Ivy Queen)	MC Ceja	Como Antes
2016	"Freestyle"	DJ Blass	The Link Up
2016	"Las Que Se Ponen Bien La Falda" (Maria Jose featuring Ivy Queen)	Maria Jose	Habla Ahora
2017	"La Playa" (Remix) (Kafu Banton featuring Ivy Queen)	Kafu Banton	El Mutante
2018	"Necesito De Ti" (Guelo Star featuring Ivy Queen)	Guelo Star	The Movie Man 2
2018	"Se Te Apago La Luz"	Melymel	Dragon Queen
2018	"Se Que Tú Quieres"	Various Artists	Kilates, Vol. 3: The Reggaeton Trilogy

=== 2020s ===
Year	Title	Artist	Album
2020	"Original Queen"	Rafi Mercenario	Reggaeton Gold, Vol. 2
2021	"Leyendas" (with Karol G, Wisin & Yandel and Nicky Jam featuring Zion and Alberto Stylee)	Karol G	KG0516
2021	"Calenton"	DJ Urba & Rome	Reggaeton de la Mata
2022	"Algo Bonito"	iLe	Nacarile
2022	"La Vida Es Así"	Arthur Hanlon	Piano & Mujer, Vol. 2
2022	"We Are Going to Make it Tonight" (with Catalina García, Ha*Ash, Debi Nova and Lupita Infante)	Arthur Hanlon	Piano & Mujer, Vol. 2
2022	"Ya Te Olvide"	Arthur Hanlon	Piano & Mujer, Vol. 2
2023	"Celebrando"	Rauw Alejandro	Playa Saturno
2025	"A Forgotten Spot" (with Lin-Manuel Miranda, Zion & Lennox, De La Ghetto, PJ Sin Suela and Lucecita Benitez)	Lin-Manuel Miranda	Hamildrops: The Complete Collection
2025	"La Razón"	Elvis Crespo	Poeta Herio
2026	"Cría y Calle"	Boy Wonder and Charlee Way	La Liga Femenina
2026	"Hasta Abajo"	Wisin	La Universidad del Perreo

- The same songs have appeared on multiple different albums therefore, only the earliest album appearance is listed above. Furthermore, songs included on albums by Queen are not listed.

=== Unreleased songs ===
Year	Title	Intended album
2004	"Turn Me On" (Remix) (with Kevin Lyttle)	Unknown
2006	"Intro" (with DJ Kay Slay and Gran Omar)	Cosa Nostra
2006	"Listo Para Mi"	Cosa Nostra
2006	"Se Testigo" (with Mexicano 777)	Cosa Nostra
2006	"Te Buscó" (with Gran Omar)	Cosa Nostra
2006	"Reggaeton Dale Dale" (featuring N.O.R.E. and Big Mato)	Cosa Nostra
2008	"Sentimientos" (Remix) (featuring Randy)	Sentimiento: Platinum Edition
2009	"No Te Equivoques" (featuring Wisin & Yandel)	Drama Queen
2011	"Underground"	Drama Queen
2011	"Quiero Amanecer Contigo"	Drama Queen
2012	"Rastrillea 2" (J-King & Maximan featuring De La Ghetto, Arcángel, Zion & Lennox, Ivy Queen, Alexis & Fido, Baby Rasta & Gringo, Voltio, Plan B, Trébol Clan, Ñengo Flow, Franco "El Gorila", Nova & Jory, Yaga & Mackie, Gastam, Guelo Star, Chyno Nyno, Ñejo & Dálmata, OG Black & Guayo "El Bandido", Syko and Tony Lenta)	Quieran Perreo
2012	"Quiere Under"	Musa
2019	"La Roca" (Remix) (featuring Mozart La Para)	Unknown
2019	"Tarde"	Unknown
2020	"Un Día Sin Nosotras" (with Karol G, Natti Natasha and Becky G)	TBA
2021	"KLK" (Remix) (with Arca, Rosalía and La Goony Chonga)	TBA

== Music videos ==
=== As lead performer ===
Year	Title	Director(s)
1995	"Muchos Quieren Tumbarme"	
1996	"Pon Atencion"	Ozzie Forbes
1996	"Reggae Respect"	
1997	"Al Escuchar Mi Coro"	
1998	"En Primera Fila"	
1999	"In The Zone" (featuring Wyclef Jean)	George Barnes, Jeff Kennedy
1999	"In The Zone" (featuring Wyclef Jean)	Gabriel Goldberg
2001	"El Me Mintio"	
2001	"En La Disco"	
2003	"Quiero Bailar"	Harry Figueroa
2003	"Quiero Saber" (featuring Gran Omar)	Harry Figueroa
2003	"La Otra"	
2003	"Tuya Soy"	
2003	"Guillaera" (featuring Gran Omar)	
2003	"Papi Te Quiero"	
2003	"Tu No Puedes" (featuring Gran Omar)	
2004	"Chika Ideal"	
2004	"Dile"	
2004	"Dale Volumen"	
2004	"Matando" (featuring Gran Omar)	
2005	"Te He Querido, Te He Llorado"	Marlon Peña, Alvaro Rangel
2007	"Que Lloren"	Marlon Peña
2007	"En Que Fallamos"	Ron Jaramillo
2007	"Menor Que Yo"	Marlon Peña
2008	"Dime"	Marlon Peña
2010	"La Vida Es Así"	Marlon Peña
2010	"Amor Puro"	Marlon Peña
2012	"Peligro De Extinción"	Marlon Peña
2012	"Vamos A Celebrar" (with Victoria Sanabria)	
2014	"Soy Libre"	Vladimir Grullón
2014	"Vamos A Guerrear" (featuring Ñengo Flow)	Vladimir Grullón
2014	"Nací Para Amarte" (featuring Jowell & Randy)	Vladimir Grullón
2014	"Vendetta"	Vladimir Grullón
2016	"Que Se Jodan"	Vladimir Grullón
2017	"Sola"	Vladimir Grullón
2017	"El Lobo Del Cuento"	Juan Restrepo
2017	"No Pueden Pararme"	Vladimir Grullón
2018	"Por Mí"	Vladimir Grullón
2018	"Mí Vecina"	Juan Restrepo
2019	"Pal Frente y Pa Tras"	Cinema Entertainment
2019	"Llego La Queen"	Vladimir Grullón
2019	"Y Tu"	Juan Restrepo
2019	"The Queen Is Here"	Juan Restrepo
2019	"La Roca"	
2019	"Yo Quiero Bailar"	
2019	"Se Te Apago La Luz" (with Melymel)	Steven Philip
2020	"Un Baile Mas"	Virginia Romero
2020	"Antídoto"	
2020	"Peligrosa"	
2020	"Next"	Gus
2020	"La Vida Es Un Carnaval" (with Celia Cruz)	
2021	"Lil Havana" (Remix) (with Fredo Versatil)	DonbiTV
2021	"Calentón"	Gus
2022	"Pa’ Mi" (with Peter Nieto)	Pedro Vazquez
2022	"Quien Dijo"	Jack Nine
2022	"Villana"	Jack Nine
2022	"Bye Bye"	Pedro Vázquez
2022	"Ya Te Olvide"	
2023	"Algo Bonito" (with iLe)	Claudia Calderon
2023	"Toma"	Abez
2023	"Toma" (Remix) (featuring Lennox, Brray, Marconi Impara and Eix)	Abez
2024	"Primer Aviso" (with Maria Becerra)	Júlian Levy
2024	"Perdió" (with Bad Gyal)	Stillz
2024	"De Luto"	Jack Nine
2025	"Coincidimos" (with Nanpa Basico)	Jack Nine
2025	"Casi Casi"	Jack Nine
2025	"11:11"	Pedro Vazquez
2026	"Flow de Revista"	Ivy Queen
2026	"Cria y Calle" (with Boy Wonder and Charlee Way)	Jack Nine
2026	"Hasta Abajo" (with Wisin)	Fernando Lugo

=== As featured performer ===
Year	Title	Director(s)
1997	"Se Necesita Un Milagro" (Domingo Quiñones featuring Ivy Queen)	
2004	"12 Discípulos" (Eddie Dee featuring Daddy Yankee, Ivy Queen, Tego Calderón, Julio Voltio, Vico C, Zion, Lennox, Nicky Jam, Johnny Prez, Gallego, and Wiso G)	Louis Martinez
2004	"Dat Sexy Body" (Remix) (Sasha featuring Ivy Queen)	
2006	"Nuestro Himno" (Andy Andy, Autoridad de la Sierra, Aventura, Ivy Queen, Wyclef Jean, Kalimba, Kany, LDA, N Klabe, Patrulla 81, Pitbull, Ponce Carlos, Rayito, Reik, Frank Reyes, Tony Sunshine, Olga Tañon, Gloria Trevi, Voz a Voz and Yemaya)	Adam Kidron, Brian Kushner
2008	"Te Regalo Amores" (Remix) (R.K.M & Ken-Y featuring Ivy Queen)	Steve Billo
2016	"Las Que Se Ponen Bien La Falda" (María José featuring Ivy Queen)	Pablo Croce

=== Cameo appearances ===
Year	Title	Director(s)
2000	"100%" (Big Pun featuring Tony Sunshine)	Chris Robinson
2018	"Rap Bruto" (Residente & Nach)	Rene Joglar, Pepe Avila, Rebecca Adorno, Jil Hardin

== Live performances ==
=== Award show performances ===
Date	Event	City	Performed song(s)
September 23, 2004	2004 Premios Juventud	Miami	"Chika Ideal"
September 22, 2005	2005 Premios Juventud	Coral Gables	"Cuentale"
November 3, 2005	2005 Latin Grammy Awards	Los Angeles	"Los 12 Discípulos" (with Eddie Dee, Tego Calderon, Vico C, Julio Voltio, Nicky Jam, Zion, Lennox, Tito "El Bambino", and Gallego)
July 13, 2006	2006 Premios Juventud	Coral Gables	"Te He Querido, Te He Llorado"
November 2, 2006	2006 Latin Grammy Awards	New York City	"Noche de Entierro (Nuestro Amor)" (with Héctor el Father, Wisin & Yandel and Tony Tun Tun)
November 8, 2007	2007 Latin Grammy Awards	Las Vegas	"Que Lloren"
July 15, 2010	2010 Premios Juventud	Coral Gables	"La Vida es Así"
October 24, 2019	La Musa Awards 2019	Miami	"Quiero Bailar"; "Te He Querido, Te He Llorado"; "La Vida es Así"
October 14, 2020	2020 Billboard Music Awards	Los Angeles	"Yo Perreo Sola" (with Bad Bunny and Nesi)
November 19, 2020	2020 Latin Grammy Awards	Miami	"El Cantante" (with Victor Manuelle, Rauw Alejandro, Ricardo Montaner and Jesús Navarro)
February 18, 2021	Premio Lo Nuestro 2021	Miami	"Todos Me Miran"; "Grande"; "Gloria"; (with Gloria Trevi)
February 23, 2023	Premio Lo Nuestro 2023	Miami	"Los 12 Discípulos"; "Calenton"; "Calentura"; "Que Lloren"; "Te He Querido, Te He Llorado"; "La Vida Es Así"; "Ya Te Olvide"
May 7, 2023	Billboard Latin Women in Music 2024	Miami	"Toma"
October 26, 2023	2023 Rolling Stone en Español Awards	Miami	"Algo Bonito"; (with iLe)
July 24, 2024	2024 Premios Juventud	San Juan	"Mi Gente"
April 24, 2025	Billboard Latin Women in Music 2025	Miami	"La Negra Tiene Tumbao"
April 23, 2025	Billboard Latin Women in Music 2026	Miami	"Championa"; "Te He Querido, Te He Llorado"; "La Vida Es Así"; "Los 12 Discípulos"; "Que Lloren"; "Quiero Bailar"

=== Livestream concerts ===
Date	Title	City	Performed song(s)
April 10, 2021	Urban Divas United	Miami	"Te He Querido, Te He Llorado" (with Goyo, Nesi and Chesca); "Llego La Queen"; "Que Lloren"; "Por Mi" (with Snow Tha Product); "La Vida Es Asi" (with Natalia Jimenez); "Next"; "Quiero Bailar"
November 16, 2025	La Casa de Alofoke 2	Santo Domingo	"Te He Querido, Te He Llorado"; "Que Lloren"; "Quiero Saber"; "Noche De Entierro (Nuestro Amor)"; "Los 12 Discipulos"; "Quiero Bailar"

=== Other concerts ===
Date	Title	City	Performed song(s)
September 9, 2023	Killa Queen	San Juan	"Llego La Queen"; "Que Lloren"; "Calentura"; "Tuya Soy"; "Quiero Saber"; "Dile"; "La Roca"; "Cuéntale"; "Libertad"; "Malvada"; "Noche de Entierro"; "Los 12 Discípulos"; "Sentimientos"; "Dime Si Recuerdas"; "Quien Dijo"; "Dime"; "Te He Querido, Te He Llorado"; "En Que Fallamos"; "Menor Que Yo"; "Pobre Corazón"; "Menéalo" (with Lisa M); "Pongan Atención"; "Como Mujer"; "Muchos Quieren Tumbarme"; "Reggae Respect"; "Papi Te Quiero"; "Se Desvive Por Ella" (with La Sista); "Toma" (Remix) (with Eix & Marconi Impara); "787"; "La Vida Es Así"; "Celebrando"; "Yo Perreo Sola" (Remix); "Quiero Bailar"
October 11, 2023	Tiny Desk	Washington DC	"Reza Por Mi"; "La Vida Es Así"; "Menor Que Yo"; "En Que Fallamos"; "Quiero Bailar"
October 14, 2025	Argentina vs Puerto Rico International Friendly (Half-time Performance)	Miami	"Championa"; "Que Lloren"; "Noche De Entierro (Nuestro Amor)"; "Calentura"; "Los 12 Discipulos"; "Quiero Bailar"

=== 2000s ===
Date	Event	City	Performed song(s)
July 23, 2005	Reventón Súper Estrella	Anaheim	"Quiero Bailar"; "Te He Querido, Te He Llorado"
September 18, 2005	Viva Fest	Atlanta	Unknown
September 25, 2005	Reggaeton Summerfest	Miami	Unknown
March 26, 2006	Reggaeton Spring Bling	Fairfax	Unknown
September 16, 2006	New York Salsa Festival	New York City	"Calle Luna Calle Sol"

=== 2010s ===
Date	Event	City	Performed song(s)
March 24, 2010	Calibash	Los Angeles	Unknown
July 24, 2010	Reventon Super Estrella	Los Angeles	Unknown
August 5, 2011	Puerto Rican Parade & Festival	Rochester	Unknown
January 24, 2012	Calibash	Los Angeles	"Quiero Bailar"; "Que Lloren"; "Te He Querido, Te He Llorado"
June 20, 2013	Fiesta Telemicro	Santo Domingo	"Quiero Bailar"; "Que Lloren"; "Te He Querido, Te He Llorado"; "Dime Si Recuerdas"; "En Que Fallamos"; "Noche de Entierro (Nuestro Amor)"; "Los 12 Discípulos"; "Muchos Quieren Tumbarme"; "Reggae Respect"; "Punto 40"; "Al Escuchar Mi Coro"; "Papi Te Quiero"; "La Batidora"; "La Vida es Así"
September 14, 2013	Calibash	Los Angeles	Unknown
July 26, 2014	Guaya Guaya Fest	San Juan	Unknown
November 27, 2014	Urban Fest	Guayaquil	Unknown
October 28, 2015	Megaton	New York City	Unknown
November 8, 2015	Megaland	Bogotá	"Quiero Bailar"; "Que Lloren"; "Tuya Soy"; "Quiero Saber"; "Dile"; "La Camisa Negra"; "Noche de Entierro (Nuestro Amor)"; "Los 12 Discípulos"; "Cuéntale"; "Libertad"; "Vendetta"; "Te He Querido, Te He Llorado"; "La Vida es Así"
December 5, 2015	Grand Slam Party Latino	Miami	Unknown
June 9, 2017	Soulfrito Urban Music Festival	Brooklyn	Unknown
November 11, 2017	Tropicalia Fest	Long Beach	Unknown
May 19, 2018	Red Bull Music Festival	New York City	Unknown
March 15, 2019	Pot of Gold	Phoenix	Unknown
April 12, 2019	Summer Bash La Fiesta	Guayaquil	Unknown
May 31, 2019	Primavera Sound	Barcelona	Unknown
August 11, 2019	Latin Reggaeton Festival	Portland	Unknown
August 13, 2019	Megaton	Los Angeles	Unknown
November 9, 2019	Tropicalia Fest	Pamona	Unknown
November 23, 2019	Coca-Cola Flow Fest	Mexico City	"Llego La Queen"; "Quiero Saber"; "Te He Querido, Te He Llorado"; "Amame o Mátame"; "Pobre Corazón"; "Que Lloren"; "787"; "Noche de Entierro (Nuestro Amor)"; "Los 12 Discípulos"; "La Roca"; "La Vida es Así"; "Quiero Bailar"
November 29, 2019	Mega Bash	Newark	Unknown

=== 2020s ===
Date	Event	City	Performed song(s)
March 15, 2020	Calle Ocho Festival	Miami	"La Vida Es Un Carnaval" (with Celia Cruz)
April 25, 2020	Mega Mezcla	Newark	Unknown
August 20, 2021	Ruido Fest	Chicago	"Quiero Bailar"; "Llego La Queen"; "Calenton"; "Dime Si Recuerdas"; "La Vida Es Así"; "Sentimientos"; "Te He Querido, Te He Llorado"; "Que Lloren"; "Yo Perreo Sola"
December 4, 2021	Mega Bash	Newark	Unknown
December 17, 2021	Miami Bash	Miami	"Llego La Queen"; "Que Lloren"; "Noche de Entierro (Nuestro Amor)"; "12 Discípulos"; "Yo Perreo Sola"; "Quiero Bailar"
February 12, 2022	Coca-Cola Flow Fest	Monterrey	"Llego La Queen"; "Que Lloren"; "Quiero Saber"; "Noche de Entierro (Nuestro Amor)"; "12 Discípulos"; "Yo Perreo Sola"; "La Vida Es Así"; "Quiero Bailar"
April 30, 2022	Vibra Urbana	Las Vegas	Unknown
May 27, 2022	Mega Mezcla	Newark	Unknown
June 12, 2022	Vibra Urbana	Orlando	Unknown
July 16, 2022	Mas Flow Reggaeton Festival	Chicago	Unknown
September 10, 2022	Rumbazo Fest	Las Vegas	Unknown
October 31, 2022	Halloween Urban Dance Fest	Lima	Unknown
December 2, 2022	Coca-Cola Flow Fest	Monterrey	Unknown
January 21, 2023	Calibash	Los Angeles	"Llego La Queen"; "Quiero Saber"; "Que Lloren"; "Te He Querido, Te He Llorado"; "Noche de Entierro (Nuestro Amor)"; "Los 12 Discípulos"; "Quiero Bailar"
March 17, 2023	Calibash	Las Vegas	"Llego La Queen"; "Quiero Saber"; "Say Hoo"; "Que Lloren"; "Te He Querido, Te He Llorado"; "Never Leave You (Uh Oooh, Uh Oooh)"; "Si Una Vez"; "Noche de Entierro (Nuestro Amor)"; "Los 12 Discípulos"; "Yo Perreo Sola"; "Quiero Bailar"
May 20, 2023	Reggaeton Lima Festival	Lima	Unknown
May 27, 2023	Sueños Fest	Chicago	Unknown
August 12, 2023	Baja Beach Fest	Rosarito Beach	Unknown
February 17, 2024	Vibra Fest	Miami	Unknown
May 4, 2024	Miami Bash	Miami	Unknown
May 25, 2024	Fuego Fuego Fest	Montreal	Unknown
November 20, 2024	Nuestro Sonidos Fest	New York City	"Llego La Queen"; "Que Lloren"; "Calentura"; "Tuya Soy"; "Quiero Saber"; "Dile"; "La Roca"; "Cuéntale"; "Libertad"; "Malvada"; "Te He Querido, Te He Llorado"; "Noche De Entierro (Nuestro Amor)"; "Los 12 Discipulos"; "Sentimientos"; "Dime Si Recuerdas"; "Quien Dijo"; "Dime"; "En Que Fallamos"; "Pobre Corazón"; Old School Medley: "Pongan Atención" / "Como Mujer" / "Muchos Quieren Tumbarme" / "Reggae Respect"; "Papi Te Quiero"; "Dile" (Don Omar); "Salsa Medley: "Tración" / "Calle Luna Calle Sol" / "Perdóname" / "Ella Se Hizo Deseo" / "Un Verano En Nueva York"; "Menor Que Yo"; "Reza Por Mi"; "De Luto"; "Yo Perreo Sola" (Remix); "Celebrando"; "La Vida Es Así"; Quiero Bailar"; Encore: "Que Bonita Bandera"
May 23, 2025	Reggaeton Music Festival	Los Angeles	Unknown
May 30, 2025	I Love Reggaeton Fest	Valencia	Unknown
June 7, 2025	I Love Reggaeton Fest	Madrid	Unknown
August 17, 2025	Reggaelandia	Los Angeles	Unknown
August 30, 2025	Jalo Fest	Sacramento	Unknown
October 31, 2025	Perreoland	Providence	Unknown
November 1, 2025	Perreoland	Reading	Unknown
December 6, 2025	Vibra Fest	Santiago	TBA
February 13, 2026	Ondas Fest	Bogota	TBA

== Other credits ==
Title	Year	Performer(s)	Album	Credit(s)
"Mentiroso"	2006	K-Narias, Baby Ranks and Angel Lopez	Hombres Con Pañales	Sample
"Quiero Saber"	2006	Tropicalismo Flamante	Quiero Saber	Interpolation
"Cuéntale"	2007	La Conquista	Muévelo	Interpolation
"Te Propongo"	2007	Mikey Perfecto	En Cuerpo y Alma	Songwriting
"Pobre Corazon"	2007	Divino	Sentimiento	Songwriting
"Febrero 14"	2008	Erre XI	Erre XI	Songwriting
"Coqueta"	2010	DJ Peligro	Non-album single	Background vocals
"Te He Querido"	2011	Yoliame	Simplemente Yoliame	Interpolation
"Dime"	2016	Beatriz Gonzalez	Aunque Sea Así	Interpolation
"Dime"	2018	Malucci	Malu Vuitton	Interpolation
"Ponte Pa Mí"	2018	Sophy Mell and Jowell & Randy	Ni Diabla Ni Santa	Interpolation
"Pobre Corazon"	2018	Jose Guitarra	Non-album single	Interpolation
"Rap Bruto"	2018	Residente and Nach	Non-album single	Background vocals
"Loca"	2019	Livesa	Non-album single	Interpolation
"Mami"	2019	Paloma Mami	Sueños de Dalí	Songwriting
"Nasty Girls"	2019	GG Izzy	Non-album single	Interpolation
"Vamo a Darno"	2019	Ufell	Virgen	Background vocals
"Sola"	2020	SRG and Maycol RC	Non-album single	Interpolation
"Montando"	2020	LASTMONDAY	Hey, Tigerito	Background vocals
"Darte"	2020	Marlon Pacman and Inri	Non-album single	Interpolation
"Quien Te Va Querer"	2020	Diablos Locos	Reggaeton	Interpolation
"Pobre Corazón"	2020	Grupo Corsario	Non-album single	Interpolation
"Rompela DJ"	2020	Danik, Kimo, Machado, Vagón Coyote and Di Alexander	Non-album single	Interpolation
"Sin Censura"	2020	Sweet Flow, Izzi and Susy G	Non-album single	Interpolation
"Ojo e Plata"	2020	Shito	Non-album single	Interpolation
"La Vida Es Así"	2021	Lau C	Non-album single	Interpolation
"Muchos Quieren Tumbarme"	2021	Villano Antillano	Ellas, Mujeres en la Música	Interpolation
"Como Antes"	2022	Marli	Non-album single	Interpolation
"Yo Quiero Bailar"	2022	Valentina Marinkovic	Non-album single	Interpolation
"Verde Menta"	2023	Rauw Alejandro	Saturno	Sample
"Profesor Sandunga"	2026	Wisin	La Universidad del Perreo	Songwriting

== See also ==
- List of awards and nominations received by Ivy Queen
