= List of awards and nominations received by Ivy Queen =

Ivy Queen awards and nominations
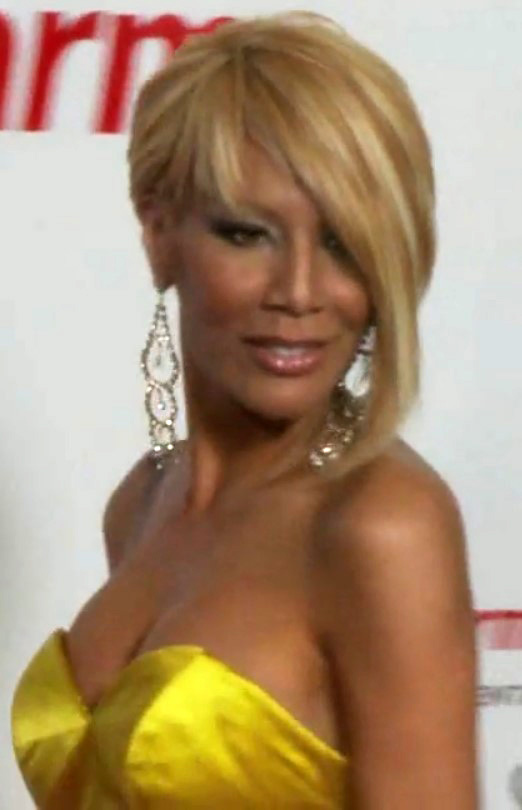
- Ivy Queen at the 2009 Latin Billboard Music Awards
Awards and nominations
Award	Wins	Nominations

Totals (Note: Certain award groups do not simply award one winner. They acknowledge several different recipients, have runners-up, and have third place. Since this is a specific recognition and is different from losing an award, runner-up mentions are considered wins in this award tally. For simplification and to avoid errors, each award in this list has been presumed to have had a prior nomination.)
- Wins: 33
- Nominations: 68
- Honours: 12

Ivy Queen is a Puerto Rican singer and songwriter who has received awards and nominations for her contributions to the music industry, specifically in Latin music and several of its subgenres. Having sold more than two million records, she is the most successful female reggaetón artist and the "only significant female reggaetón rapper" according to The New York Times. Ivy Queen is commonly referred to as the "Queen of Reggaetón" in a genre dominated by male singers, and has become the "indisputable lead female voice of not only Latin urban and reggaetón music but an international icon for Latin music itself" according to the president of Universal Music Latino.

In 2006, Ivy Queen received the first Premio Juventud "Diva Award", which honored the singer for her musical career and is her only Premio Juventud thus far. In 2009, "Dime", from the album Ivy Queen 2008 World Tour Live!, became her most nominated work at the Billboard Latin Music Award ceremony, where she was awarded both "Hot Latin Song of the Year, Female" and "Tropical Airplay Song of the Year, Female" out of five total nominations. Later in 2010, the song gained Ivy Queen an award from the American Society of Composers, Authors and Publishers (ASCAP) for "Urban Song of the Year".

At the Broadcast Music, Inc. (BMI) Awards, Ivy Queen has been given the "Award-Winning Song" award for "Cuéntale", "Te He Querido, Te He Llorado", "Dime", and, most recently in 2012, "La Vida Es Así". Sentimiento, Ivy Queen's sixth studio album, nominated three times for three different awards, was nominated at the Latin Grammy Awards of 2007 for "Best Urban Music Album", her first Latin Grammy nomination. Queen has received ten nominations from the Billboard Latin Music Awards. Flashback, Ivy Queen's fifth studio album has been nominated a total of three times, while Drama Queen, her seventh studio album follows with two nominations. As of January 2023, Ivy Queen has received thirty-two awards from sixty-seven nominations.

== Latin Grammy Awards ==
The Latin Grammy Awards are awarded annually by the Latin Academy of Recording Arts & Sciences in the United States. Ivy Queen has won once from four nominations.

Year	Nominee / work	Award	Result
2007	Sentimiento	Best Urban Music Album	Nominated
2011	Drama Queen	Best Urban Music Album	Nominated
2013	Musa	Best Urban Music Album	Nominated
2021	Herself	Leading Ladies of Entertainment	Honoree

== Billboard Latin Music Awards ==
The Billboard Latin Music Awards are awarded annually by Billboard magazine in the United States. Ivy Queen has received two awards from eleven nominations.

Year	Nominee / work	Award	Result
2005	"Intro – Los 12 Discípulos"	Tropical Airplay Track of the Year, New Artist	Nominated
2005	"Dile"	Tropical Airplay Track of the Year, Female	Nominated
2005	Diva: Platinum Edition	Reggaeton Album of the Year	Nominated
2006	Flashback	Reggaeton Album of the Year	Nominated
2008	Sentimiento	Reggaeton Album of the Year	Nominated
2008	"Que Lloren"	Latin Dance Club Play Track of the Year	Nominated
2009	"Dime"	Hot Latin Song of the Year, Female	Won
2009	"Dime"	Tropical Airplay Track of the Year, Female	Won
2009	"Dime"	Latin Rhythm Airplay Track of the Year, Solo	Nominated
2011	Herself	Hot Latin Songs Artist of the Year, Female	Nominated
2011	Herself	Top Latin Albums Artist of the Year, Female	Nominated
2023	Herself	Icon Award	Honoree

== Billboard Women in Music Awards ==
Billboard Women in Music is an annual event held by Billboard. In 2023, Ivy Queen was recognized with the Icon Award, "given to accomplished women who have made historic contributions to the music industry."

Year	Nominee / work	Award	Result
2023	Herself	Icon Award	Honoree

== Billboard Latin Women in Music Awards ==
Billboard Latin Women in Music is an annual event held by Billboard. In 2026, Ivy Queen was recognized with the Pioneer Award, presented to artists "who have made groundbreaking contributions to the music industry, opened new paths, broken barriers and inspired future generations through their artistry, cultural impact and lasting legacy."

Year	Nominee / work	Award	Result
2026	Herself	Pioneer Award	Honoree

== American Society of Composers, Authors and Publishers Awards ==
The ASCAP Awards are awarded annually by the American Society of Composers, Authors and Publishers in the United States. Ivy Queen won the one award for which she was nominated.

Year	Nominee / work	Award	Result
2009	"Dime"	Urban Song of the Year	Won

== Broadcast Music, Inc. Awards ==
Broadcast Music, Inc. (BMI) annually hosts award shows that honor the songwriters, composers and music publishers of the year's most-performed songs in the BMI catalog. Ivy Queen received all four awards for which she was nominated.

Year	Nominee / work	Award	Result
2007	"Cuéntale"	Award-Winning Songs	Won
2007	"Te He Querido, Te He Llorado"	Award-Winning Songs	Won
2010	"Dime"	Award-Winning Songs	Won
2012	"La Vida Es Así"	Award-Winning Songs	Won

== Premios Rolling Stone en Español ==
The Premios Rolling Stone en Español Awards are presented annually by Rolling Stone magazine in the United States. In 2023, she was the first artist to be presented the Rolling Stone en Español Legacy Award.

Year	Nominee / work	Award	Result
2023	"Algo Bonito"	Song of the Year	Nominated
2023	Herself	Legacy Award	Honoree

== Premios Juventud ==
The Premios Juventud are awarded annually by the television network Univision in the United States. Ivy Queen has received one award from seven nominations.

Year	Nominee / work	Award	Result
2005	Herself	Voice of the Moment, Female	Nominated
2005	Herself	Favorite Urban Artist	Nominated
2006	Herself	Diva Award	Won
2006	Herself	Favorite Urban Artist	Nominated
2007	Herself	Favorite Urban Artist	Nominated
2008	Herself	Favorite Urban Artist	Nominated
2022	"Pa' Mí"	Best Tropical Collaboration	Nominated
2023	"Algo Bonito"	Best Music Video	Nominated

== Premios Icono ==
The Premios Icono Awards are presented annually by the Latin Urban Conference in Colombia. In 2021, she was awarded the Urban Icon Award in recognition of her musical achievements and inspiration on the Latin urban music genre.

Year	Nominee / work	Award	Result
2021	Herself	Urban Icon Award	Honoree

== Premio Lo Nuestro ==
The Premio Lo Nuestro Awards are awarded annually by the television network Univision in the United States. Ivy Queen has received one award from three nominations. At the 2023 award show Queen will be awarded the Musical Legacy recognizing her musical career within the urban genre.

Year	Nominee / work	Award	Result
2007	Flashback	Urban Album of the Year	Nominated
2008	Sentimiento	Urban Album of the Year	Won
2021	Herself	Urban Artist of the Year, Female	Nominated
2023	Herself	Musical Legacy Award	Honoree

== Premios La Musa ==
The Premios La Musa awards are awarded annually in the United States, for excellence in lyricism and songwriting. Queen has been nominated twice. In 2019, she performed her song “Quiero Bailar” at the ceremony with an orchestra.

Year	Nominee / work	Award	Result
2017	Herself: "Quiero Bailar"; "Que Lloren"; "La Vida es Así"	Latin Songwriters Hall of Fame	Nominated
2019	Herself: "Quiero Bailar"; "Que Lloren"; "La Vida es Así"	Latin Songwriters Hall of Fame	Inducted

== Premios Tu Musica Urbano ==
The Premios Tu Música Urbano awards are awarded annually by Telemundo in the United States. Queen received recognition for her musical career at the award show's first ceremony.

Year	Nominee / work	Award	Result
2019	Herself	Lifetime Achievement Award	Honoree
2020	Herself	Top Female Artist	Nominated
2020	Llego La Queen	Album of the Year, Female	Nominated
2022	Herself	Top Female Artist	Nominated
2022	"Pa' Mí"	Top Urban Tropical Song	Nominated
2023	Herself	Best Comeback	Nominated
2026	Herself	Female Artist of the Year	TBA

== Premios Quiero ==
The Premios Quiero are presented by Argentine television channel “Quiero música en mi idioma” in Argentina, celebrating audiovisual artistic excellence.

Year	Nominee / work	Award	Result
2024	"Primer Aviso"	Best Urban Music Video	TBA

== Contrast Awards ==
The Contrast Awards are presented by Contrast magazine in the United States.

Year	Nominee / work	Award	Result
2023	Herself	LGBTQ Advocacy Award	Honoree

== Hispanic Heritage Awards ==
The Hispanic Heritage Awards are presented annually by the Hispanic Heritage Foundation in the United States. At the 34th annual Hispanic Heritage Awards, Queen received the 2021 Vision Award, recognizing her musical career.

Year	Nominee / work	Award	Result
2021	Herself	Vision Award	Honoree

== Video Prisma Awards ==
The Video Prisma Awards are presented annually by the Buenos Aires Music Video Festival in Argentina. The ceremony recognized the best music videos in Argentina and around the world.

Year	Nominee / work	Award	Result
2023	"Algo Bonito"	Best Social Impact Music Video	Won

== Bogota Music Video Festival ==
The Bogota Music Video Festival are presented annually in Colombia. The ceremony recognized the best music videos in Colombia and around the world.

Year	Nominee / work	Award	Result
2023	"Algo Bonito"	Best Music Video (Latin America)	TBA

== International Dance Music Awards ==
The International Dance Music Awards are presented annually by the Winter Music Conference in the United States. Ivy Queen received has yet to receive an award from one nomination.

Year	Nominee / work	Award	Result
2007	"Cuéntale"	Best Latin/Reggaetón Track	Nominated

== International Reggae and World Music Awards ==
The International Reggae and World Music Awards are awarded annually in the United States. Ivy Queen received one award from one nomination.

Year	Nominee / work	Award	Result
2004	Herself	Best Reggaetón Entertainer	Won

== GLAAD Media Awards ==
The GLAAD Media Awards are awarded annually by the Gay & Lesbian Alliance Against Defamation in the United States. Ivy Queen received one award from one nomination.

Year	Nominee / work	Award	Result
2008	Herself	Special Recognition	Honoree

== El Premio De La Gente Latin Music Awards ==
The El Premio De La Gente Latin Music Awards are awarded annually by the Spanish-language television network Telemundo in the United States. Ivy Queen received no awards from two nominations.

Year	Nominee / work	Award	Result
2005	Herself	Urban or Duranguense Artist or Group of the Year — Male or Female	Nominated
2005	Real	Urban or Duranguense Album of the Year — Male or Female	Nominated

== Premios Furia Musical ==
The Premios Furia Musical are award annually by the television network Televisa in Mexico. Ivy Queen has received one award from one nomination.

Year	Nominee / work	Award	Result
2006	Herself	Best Reggaeton Singer of the Year	Won

== Premios Texas ==
The Premios Texas Awards are presented annually by the television network Univision in the United States. Ivy Queen has received one award from one nomination.

Year	Nominee / work	Award	Result
2012	Herself	Best Urban Artist	Won

== People's Choice Reggaetón and Urban Awards ==
The People's Choice Reggaeton and Urban Awards are awarded annually by the public of Puerto Rico, who chooses their favorite artist in various categories. Ivy Queen has received four awards from five nominations.

Year	Nominee / work	Award	Result
2004	Herself	Unknown	Won
2005	Herself	Unknown	Won
2007	Herself	Female Artist of the Year	Won
2007	"Te He Querido, Te He Llorado"	Song with the Best Elaboration of Lyrics	Won
2007	Flashback	Compilation Album of the Year	Nominated

== Artista Awards ==
The Artista Awards are presented annually by Artista magazine in the United States. Queen has received two awards from two nominations.

Year	Nominee / work	Award	Result
1997	Herself	Artista '97 (Artist of 1997)	Won
1997	Herself	People's Favorite Rap Singer	Won

== Megaton Awards ==
The Megaton Awards are presented annually by the SBS Reggaetón Network, composed of the American radio stations "Reggaeton 94.FM", "mega 97.9FM", "El Sol 95.7FM", and "Latino 96.3FM" in the United States. Queen has received one awards from one nomination.

Year	Nominee / work	Award	Result
2005	Herself	Female Artist of the Year	Won

== National Festival of Rap and Reggae Awards ==
The National Festival of Rap and Reggae Awards are presented annually in the United States. Queen has received one award from one nomination.

Year	Nominee / work	Award	Result
1997	Herself	Rap Singer of the Year	Won

== Other accolades ==
=== Billboard Year-End Charts ===
Top Female Latin Albums Artist of the Year
Year	Work	Rank	Ref.
2011	Herself	5	

Top Hot Latin Song of the Year
Year	Work	Rank	Ref.
2006	"Cuentale"	24	
2007	"Que Lloren"	47	
2009	"Dime"	82	
2010	"La Vida Es Así"	37	

Top Latin Album of the Year
Year	Work	Rank	Ref.
2006	Flashback	64	
2007	Sentimiento	33	
2008	Sentimiento	51	
2010	Drama Queen	60	

Top Latin Rhythm Album of the Year
Year	Work	Rank	Ref.
2006	Flashback	14	
2007	Sentimiento	8	
2008	Sentimiento	6	
2010	Drama Queen	8	
2011	Drama Queen	14	
2012	Musa	19	

Top Latin Rhythm Albums Artist of the Year
Year	Work	Rank	Ref.
2006	Herself	9	
2007	Herself	7	
2008	Herself	7	
2010	Herself	7	

Top Latin Rhythm Song of the Year
Year	Work	Rank	Ref.
2006	"Cuentale"	14	
2006	"Te He Querido, Te He Llorado"	26	
2006	"Libertad"	28	
2007	"Que Lloren"	16	
2008	"Dime"	14	
2009	"Dime"	10	
2010	"La Vida Es Así"	4	
2012	"Peligro De Extinción"	47	

Top Latin Rhythm Songs Artist of the Year
Year	Work	Rank	Ref.
2006	Herself	6	
2009	Herself	10	
2010	Herself	10	

Top Tropical Album of the Year
Year	Work	Rank	Ref.
2004	Diva Platinum Edition	8	
2005	Real	17	

Top Tropical Albums Artist of the Year
Year	Work	Rank	Ref.
2004	Herself	8	

Top Tropical Song of the Year
Year	Work	Rank	Ref.
2004	"12 Discípulos"	25	
2005	"Dile"	38	
2007	"Que Lloren"	37	
2010	"La Vida Es Así"	23	

=== Listicles ===
Name of publisher, name of listicle, year(s) listed, and placement result
Year(s)	Nominee / work	Listicle	Publisher	Result	Ref.
2011	"La Vida Es Así"	Best Reggaeton Songs of the Last Half-Decade (2006–2011)	LA Weekly	Honorable mention	
2012	Musa	Top 15 Latin Albums of Late Summer 2012	Rhapsody	6	
2012	Musa	Top 30 Latin Albums of 2012	Rhapsody	9	
2015	Vendetta: Urban	Best Latin and World Albums of 2015	Allmusic	Listed	
2015	Herself	25 Most Powerful Women 2015	People en Español	11	
2017	Diva	Best Rediscovered Albums of 2017	The Washington Post	Listed	
2017	"Quiero Bailar"	12 Best Reggaeton and Dancehall Choruses of the 21st Century	Billboard	10	
2017	"Quiero Bailar"	15 Essential Reggaeton Tracks that are not "Despacito"	Vulture	Listed	
2018	"Dime"	10 Reggaetón Throwback Jams You Need to Revisit Now	People en Español	Listed	
2018	"Por Mí"	5 Latin Songs to Kick off Your Summer	NPR Music	Listed	
2018	"Quiero Bailar"	200 Best Songs by 21st Century Women	NPR Music	60	
2018	"Quiero Bailar"	50 Greatest Latin Pop Songs of All Time	Rolling Stone	36	
2018	"Quiero Bailar"	28 Essential Reggaeton Songs from the Early 2000s to Now	Stereogum	Chronologically listed	
2018	The Original Rude Girl	Most Influential Albums of 1998	Remezcla	3	
2019	Herself	25 Most Powerful Women 2019	People en Español	11	
2019	Drama Queen	50 Best Latin Albums of the 2010s Decade	Billboard	Chronologically listed	
2019	Llego La Queen	Top 50 Latin Albums of 2019	Vibe	10	
2019	"Quiero Bailar"	20 Most Famous Reggaeton Songs you can't not dance to	Cultura Colectiva	Listed	
2020	Flashback	10 Reggaeton Albums every music fan should own	Consequence	Listed	
2020	Herself	Latina Powerhouse Top 100	Hola USA	Listed	
2020	Herself	10 Biggest Latina Rappers in Hip-Hop Right Now	Cosmopolitan	Listed	
2020	"Yo Perreo Sola" (Remix)	10 Best Songs of 2020	Time	3	
2021	"Camuflash"	10 Best Punchis Punchis Songs of 2021 aside from "Pepas"	Remezcla	9	
2021	Herself	Top 5 Podcasts of 2021	People en Español	Listed	
2021	Herself	31 Latinx Artists you need to add to your playlist ASAP	Glamour	Listed	
2022	Herself	5 Women Essential to Reggaeton	The Recording Academy	1	
2022	"Al Escuchar Mi Coro"	100 Greatest Reggaeton Songs of All Time	Rolling Stone	56	
2022	"Te He Querido, Te He Llorado"	100 Greatest Reggaeton Songs of All Time	Rolling Stone	36	
2022	"Yo Perreo Sola" (Remix)	100 Greatest Reggaeton Songs of All Time	Rolling Stone	14	
2022	"Quiero Bailar"	100 Greatest Reggaeton Songs of All Time	Rolling Stone	2	
2023	Herself	2023 Miami Entertainment Impact Report	Variety	Listed	
2023	"Quiero Bailar"	7 Songs We'd Teach the Aliens How To Perrear To	Remezcla	1	
2023	Herself	50 Most Essential Spanish-Language Rappers of Yesterday and Today	Billboard	8	
2023	Herself	32 Best Spanish-Language Female Rappers	Billboard	Alphabetically listed	
2023	"Celebrando"	Best Songs of 2023	Vulture	Chronologically listed	
2023	"Quiero Bailar"	50 Best Latin Pop Songs of the 21st Century	Billboard	35	
2023	Ivy Queen receives the Icon Award at the 2023 Billboard Latin Music Awards	Top 10 Latin music moments of 2023	Hola USA	5	
2025	Herself	Top 50 Female Latin Pop Artists of All Time	Billboard	12	
2025	"Quiero Bailar"	250 Greatest Songs of the 21st Century	Rolling Stone	146	
