= Next (Ivy Queen song) =

Single by Ivy Queen

Single by Ivy Queen
- Released: September 11, 2020
- Recorded: in Miami
- Genre: Reggaetón
- Length: 3:06
- Label: NKS Music
- Songwriters: Martha Pesante, Peter Nieto

Ivy Queen singles chronology
"Antídoto" (2020)	"Next" (2020)	"Yo Perreo Sola" (2020)

"Next" is a song by Puerto Rican reggaetón recording artist Ivy Queen. The song was written by Queen and Peter Nieto and released as a stand-alone single on September 11, 2020.

The song peaked at number nineteen on the Billboard Latin Digital Songs chart and number twenty-four on the Billboard Latin Rhythm Airplay chart.

== Background ==
In February 2020, Queen embarked on the Raiz No Rama World Tour, which was forced to end due to the Covid pandemic. Following this, Queen continued to work from home, recording new music.

== Critical reception ==
According to CNN en Español's Patricia Borjas, the song gives women a message of empowerment, claiming it to be dedicated to women. Vanessa Odreman for E! News called "Next" Queen's new anthem.

== Chart performance ==
Chart (2020)	Peak Position
US Latin Rhythm Airplay (Billboard)	24
