= Se Necesita Un Milagro =

Single by Domingo Quiñones featuring Ivy Queen

from the album Se Necesita Un Milagro
- Released: 1997
- Recorded: 1997
- Genre: Salsa
- Length: 4:58
- Label: RMM Records, Sonero Records
- Songwriter: Domingo Quiñones

Domingo Quiñones singles chronology
"Si Pudiera Volver A Verte" (1997)	"Se Necesita Un Milagro" (1997)	"Sin Tu Amor" (1998)

"Se Necesita Un Milagro" (English: A Miracle Is Needed) is a song by Puerto Rican-American recording artist Domingo Quiñones, from his fourth studio album, by the same name. It features a rap performed by Puerto Rican reggaeton recording artist Ivy Queen.

The song was relatively successful compared to the previous two singles from the album, "No Voy A Dejarte Ir" and "Si Puediera Volver A Verte". It reached number twenty-eight on the Billboard Latin Songs chart and number eight on the Billboard Tropical Songs chart. It was recognized at the American Society of Composers, Authors and Publishers Latin Awards of 1999 in the salsa field.

== Track listing ==
No.	Title	Writer(s)	Producer(s)	Length
1.	"Se Necesita Un Milagro" (Album Version)	Domingo Quiñones	Cuto Soto, Domingo Quiñones	4:58
2.	"Se Necesita Un Milagro" (Extended Version)	Domingo Quiñones	Soto, Quiñones	5:01
Total length:				9:59

== Chart performance ==
Chart (1998)	Peak Position
US Latin Songs (Billboard)	28
US Tropical Songs (Billboard)	8
