= Raiz No Rama World Tour =

2020 concert tour by Ivy Queen

- National tour by Ivy Queen
- Location: North America
- Associated album: All
- Start date: February 13, 2020
- End date: February 29, 2020
- Legs: 1
- No. of shows: 11 in North America

Ivy Queen concert chronology
- Ivy Queen on the Road Tour (2019); Raiz No Rama World Tour (2020); Killa Queen Tour (2025)

The Raiz No Rama World Tour (translated: Root, Not Branch World Tour) is an international tour by Puerto Rican singer-songwriter Ivy Queen. The tour originally included 19 dates, with 6 additional potential dates, before being postponed due to the COVID-19 pandemic of 2020.

Queen traveled the United States via bus for the tour, becoming her first bus tour in the country. The tour began in Elizabeth, New Jersey on February 13, 2020, ending abruptly following the March 11 show in Phoenix, Arizona.

The tour was originally in support of the future release of her next album, Raiz No Rama, with "Un Baile Mas" serving as the lead single.

== Background ==
Queen announced the tour on January 30, 2020, along with an album of the same name. "Un Baile Mas" was released the next day on January 31, 2020. The album was slated for a release in April 2020.

== Setlist ==
Setlist adapted from the March 5 show in Houston, Texas.

- "Llego La Queen"
- "Quiero Saber"
- "Muchos Quieren Tumbarme"
- "Alerta Pendiente"
- "Reggae Respect"
- "Al Escuchar Mi Coro"
- "Dile"
- "Si Una Vez"
- "Como La Flor"
- "La Roca"
- "La Batidora"
- "Noche de Entierro (Nuestro Amor)"
- "Los 12 Discipulos"
- "Dime"
- "Te He Querido, Te He Llorado"
- "Que Lloren"
- "La Vida es Así"
- "Quiero Bailar"
- Encore: "Un Baile Más"

== Tour dates ==
Date	City	Country	Venue	Capacity
North America
February 13, 2020	Elizabeth	United States	Barcode	1000
February 14, 2020	Sterling	United States	Rio Cantina	1000
February 15, 2020	Baltimore	United States	VIP Nightclub	1200
February 20, 2020	Nashville	United States	Plaza Mariachi Music City	1100
February 21, 2020	Atlanta	United States	Eleven Lounge	1200
February 22, 2020	Greenville	United States	Ibiza Nightlife	1000
February 29, 2020	Miami	United States	Studio 60	1200
March 4, 2020	Dallas	United States	House of Blues	1000
March 5, 2020	Houston	United States	House of Blues	1200
March 8, 2020	San Antonio	United States	Aztec Theater	1500
March 11, 2020	Phoenix	United States	The Van Buren	1900

=== Cancelled dates ===
Date	City	Country	Venue	Capacity
North America
March 12, 2020	San Diego	United States	House of Blues	1500
March 13, 2020	Los Angeles	United States	Giggles Nightclub	1200
March 14, 2020	Anaheim	United States	Xalos Event Center	1500
March 15, 2020	Las Vegas	United States	House of Blues	1800
March 18, 2020	San Francisco	United States	The Fillmore	1315
March 22, 2020	Sacramento	United States	Ace of Spades	1000
March 28, 2020	Indianapolis	United States	Deluxe at Old National Centre	1800
March 29, 2020	Chicago	United States	House of Blues	1800
