= La Negra Tiene Tumbao (song) =

Single by Celia Cruz featuring Mikey Perfecto

from the album La Negra Tiene Tumbao
- Released: 2001
- Genre: Salsa; reggaeton
- Length: 4:15
- Label: Sony Discos
- Songwriters: Sergio George; Fernando Osorio
- Producer: Sergio George

Celia Cruz singles chronology
| "Dos Días En La Vida" (2001) | "La Negra Tiene Tumbao" (2001) | "Hay Que Empezar Otra Vez" (2002) |

"La Negra Tiene Tumbao" (English: "The Black Woman's Got Rhythm") is a song performed by Cuban recording artist Celia Cruz. It features rap vocals performed by Mikey Perfecto. The song was written by Sergio George and Fernando Osorio, produced by George and released as the lead single from Cruz's fifty-ninth studio album La Negra Tiene Tumbao (2001).

The song peaked at number thirty on the Billboard Latin Songs chart and number four on the Billboard Tropical Songs chart. It also managed to peak at number thirteen on the Tropical Digital Songs chart in 2015. It received nominations for Record of the Year, Song of the Year, and Music Video of the Year at the Latin Grammy Awards of 2002.

== Recording and production ==
Producer Sergio George was hired to produce more traditional tracks for the album. However, George wanted to try something different. According to George, he played a demo version of "La Negra Tiene Tumbao" for Cruz, "not knowing how she would respond, and that was the song that she most reacted to". It was the last song completed for the album.

== Musical composition ==
"La Negra Tiene Tumbao" combines elements of salsa music, reggae music and hip hop music. The song's title translates to "The Black Woman has Style" or "The Black Woman has grace". The song was composed in minor key and incorporates the use of vocal call and response.

== Critical reception ==
In Allmusic's Sharon Witmer review of the parent album, the song was selected as at the "CD's biggest draw". According to Billboard magazine's Leila Cobo, the song, "with its mid-section rap became the blueprint—to this day—for a bust of recordings featuring much younger acts." The song has been considered one of Cruz's last hits before her death in July 2003.

The song received nominations for Record of the Year, Song of the Year, and Music Video of the Year at the Latin Grammy Awards of 2002. The parent album won the Latin Grammy Award for Best Salsa Album. It was nominated for Album of the Year. The song was also nominated Tropical Song of the Year at the 2003 Lo Nuestro Awards, eventually losing to Cruz's own "La Vida Es Un Carnaval". It received a nomination for Best "Party Starter" at the 2004 Premios Juventud. "La Vida Es Un Carnaval" was also nominated in the same category. In 2016, the song was awarded Television Theme Song of the Year, for the television program Celia, at the American Society of Composers, Authors and Publishers Awards.

== Other performances ==
Puerto Rican singer Ivy Queen performed the song at the third edition of the Billboard Latin Women in Music event in 2025, during a tribute to Cruz, along with Olga Tanon and La India, who performed "Yerbero Moderno" and "Quimbara", respectively.

== Charts ==
=== Weekly charts ===
| Chart (2002) | Peak |
|---|---|
| US Hot Latin Songs (Billboard) | 30 |
| US Tropical Airplay (Billboard) | 4 |

| Chart (2015) | Peak |
|---|---|
| US Tropical Digital Songs (Billboard) | 13 |

=== Year-end charts ===
| Chart (2002) | Position |
|---|---|
| US Tropical Songs (Billboard) | 10 |
