= Basta't Kasama Kita (film) =

- Theatrical release poster
- Directed by: Rory B. Quintos
- Screenplay by: Jerry Lopez Sineneng; Mel Mendoza-del Rosario; Don Cuaresma; Olivia M. Lamasan
- Story by: Jerry Lopez Sineneng; Olivia M. Lamasan
- Produced by: Malou N. Santos; Simon C. Ongpin
- Starring: Aga Muhlach; Dayanara Torres
- Cinematography: Joe Batac Jr.
- Edited by: Jess Navarro
- Music by: Nonong Buencamino
- Production company: Star Cinema
- Distributed by: Star Cinema
- Release date: February 1, 1995
- Running time: 99 minutes
- Country: Philippines
- Language: Filipino

Basta't Kasama Kita (lit. 'As long as I'm with you') is a 1995 Philippine romantic comedy-drama film directed by Rory B. Quintos on her feature film directorial debut. The film stars Aga Muhlach and Puerto Rican actress and Miss Universe 1993, Dayanara Torres. The plot is similar to that of the 1953 film Roman Holiday, which was directed by William Wyler and starred Audrey Hepburn and Gregory Peck.

The film was produced and released by Star Cinema on February 1, 1995. Basta't Kasama Kita became a box office success, and in later years, it was selected as one of the best romantic-comedy films in the last 25 years, according to a retrospective by CNN Philippines in 2017.

The film was digitally restored and remastered by the ABS-CBN Film Archives and Central Digital Lab.

== Synopsis ==
The film follows Marinella (Torres), a European royal who longs for an independent life by plotting a royal visit to the Philippines and then escaping her security detail. In the Philippines, she accidentally meets Alex (Muhlach), a jeepney driver who agrees to let her flee and work as a housemaid in exchange for food and shelter; the two soon fall for each other, but Marinella's life as a royal threatens to pull them apart.

== Plot ==
The film begins with a banquet organized by the Department of Foreign Affairs for Princess Marinella of Bavaria; she was invited as a speaker for the International Year of the Child. However, Ella hates living as a princess and wants an independent life.

Meanwhile, in Manila's informal settlement area, Alex, a hardworking jeepney driver, adopted his half-brother Paolo, who is now an orphan after his mother died. Ella wanted to go around Manila but was barred by security men. She sought the help of her Aunt Belle. The following day, Ella disguised herself as Ms. Thompson; however, several barriers came up until she finally left the hotel's premises. There, she and Alex met, and he let her live in his house. Alex is a bad-tempered person, and he would often scold Ella for some of her mistakes, but he secretly falls in love with Ella. Ella also found out that Alex had a lonely childhood. According to Sare, Alex's mother ran away and abandoned him and his father. This caused Alex to become mad, especially at his half-brother Paolo, because of what his mother did. But he learned to forgive and change.

When King Carlos arrived because of Ella's disappearance, Alex's journalist friend Brix learned about Ella's true identity, and Ella left Alex and returned home. Ella was told by her father to forget Alex, bringing her to tears. Alex, Sare, and Paolo try to reach Ella, who is attending and presiding over the "International Year of the Child" summit. Paolo came to the scene, and Ella decided to give up being a princess for Alex, and they were reunited.

== Cast ==
- Aga Muhlach as Alex
- Dayanara Torres as Princess Marinella of Bavaria/Ella
- Paolo Contis as Paolo
- Smokey Manaloto as Brix
- Ruby Rodriguez as Sare
- Heather Rasch as Ms. Thompson
- Megan Herrera as Aunt Belle
- Bill Campbell as Chief of Security
- James Slowey as King of Bavaria
- Tony Carreon as Minister of Foreign Affairs
- Pocholo Montes as Mr. Garcia
- Gammy Viray as Police Officer
- Vangie Labalan as Carinderia Owner
- Josie Tagle as Minda
- Joe Hardy as Neighbor
- Babalu as Sgt. Baba (Uncredited)
- Jake Vargas as Boy at the Convention 2

== Production ==
Under Star Cinema's film banner, Basta't Kasama Ka is director Rory B. Quintos's feature film directorial debut and fellow romantic comedy film director and colleague Cathy Garcia-Molina served as the assistant director. The screenplay was written by Jerry Lopez Sineneng, Mel Mendoza-Del Rosario, Don Cuaresma and Olivia M. Lamasan, from a story developed by Sineneng and Lamasan.
