= Jerigonza (song) =

Single by Dayanara Torres featuring Ivy Queen

from the album Antifaz
- Released: 1998
- Recorded: 1997
- Genre: Latin pop, dance
- Length: 3:57
- Label: Sony BMG
- Songwriters: Dayanara Torres, Maria de Lourdes, Eduardo Reyes

Dayanara Torres singles chronology
"Mirame Bailando" (1998)	"Jerigonza" (1998)

"Jerigonza" is a song by Puerto Rican actress, beauty queen, model and singer Dayanara Torres, from her debut studio album, Antifaz (1998). The song was written by Torres, along with Maria de Lourdes and Eduardo Reyes and released as the third and final single off the album. It features a rap performed by Puerto Rican reggaeton recording artist Ivy Queen.

The song was the most commercially successful of the three singles. It reached number seventeen on the Billboard Latin Songs chart, number six on the Billboard Tropical Songs chart and number five on the Billboard Latin Pop Songs chart in 1998.

== Chart performance ==
Chart (1998)	Peak Position
US Latin Songs (Billboard)	17
US Latin Pop Songs (Billboard)	6
US Tropical Songs (Billboard)	5
