= La Vida Es Un Carnaval =

Single by Celia Cruz

from the album Mi Vida Es Cantar
- Released: 1998
- Recorded: 1997–1998
- Genre: Salsa
- Length: 4:37
- Label: RMM Records
- Songwriter: Victor Daniel
- Producer: Isidro Infante

Celia Cruz singles chronology
"Sazón" (1994)	"La Vida Es Un Carnaval" (1998)	"Mi Vida Es Cantar" (1998)

"La Vida Es Un Carnaval" (Spanish pronunciation: [la ˈβiða es uŋ kaɾnaˈβal]; English: "Life Is a Carnival") is a song performed by Cuban recording artist Celia Cruz. The song was written by Victor Daniel, produced by Isidro Infante, arranged by Isidro Infante and released as the lead single from Cruz's studio album Mi Vida Es Cantar (1998). The song won the award for Tropical Song of the Year at the 2003 Lo Nuestro Awards.

It has become one of Cruz's signature songs, leading to the song being covered by several artists, including salsa singers Victor Manuelle and La India among others.

This song was featured in the 2000 Mexican film, Amores perros, and also in the 2002 film Antwone Fisher. The title of Samuele Sbrighi's 2006 Italian film of the same name, set in Cuba, is also inspired by the song.

Rolling Stone listed the song at number 439 on their list of the 500 Greatest Songs of All Time.

== Cover versions ==
It became one of Cruz's most popular songs, leading the song to be performed by several artists, including salsa singers Victor Manuelle and La India, as well as reggaeton singers, including Nicky Jam and Mikey Perfecto.

It was covered by reggaetón singer Mikey Perfecto on his second studio album Evolución Arrestada in 2004. The song featured guest vocals performed by Joel Dando Tra. The song combines merengue and reggaetón music and has a duration of two minutes and fifty-three seconds. It contains a verse written by Perfecto himself. Perfecto chose to cover the song because he listed Cruz as one of his many musical influences on the preceding interlude track of the album. That same year, fellow reggaetón singer Nicky Jam also covered "La Vida Es Un Carnaval".

Puerto Rican singer Víctor Manuelle performed a live version of the song which was included on the live album Victor Manuelle en Vivo: Desde el Carnegie Hall. This version peaked at number 14 on the Tropical Songs chart. Manuelle also sang an a cappella version of the song at Cruz' funeral in 2003, the impromptu performance ended the service.

Brazilian singer Daniela Mercury included a Portuguese version of the song in her 2009 album Canibália, called "A Vida é um Carnaval". American entertainer Jennifer Lopez performed the song live as part the tribute to Cruz during the American Music Awards of 2013. Angélique Kidjo recorded a cover version and music video of the song in 2019.

On June 24, 2020 during the COVID-19 pandemic Cuban-American singer-songwriter Giselle Bellas released a cover, titling it "La Vida Es Un Carnaval: Live Quarantine Edition". In October 2020, Ivy Queen performed a virtual duet of the song with Cruz at the Calle Ocho Festival in Miami.

== Charts ==
Chart (1999–2001)	Peak
Chile (EFE)	2
Costa Rica (Notimex)	2
El Salvador (EFE)	5
US Hot Latin Songs (Billboard)	40
US Latin Pop Airplay (Billboard)	32

Chart (2003)	Peak
US Tropical Airplay (Billboard)	27

Chart (2013)	Peak
US Latin Digital Song Sales (Billboard)	15

Chart (2015)	Peak
US Tropical Digital Songs (Billboard)	3

== Certifications ==
Region	Certification	Certified units/sales
Italy (FIMI) sales since 2009	Gold	50,000^{‡}
^{‡} Sales+streaming figures based on certification alone.
