= Beatriz Luengo =

Spanish musician

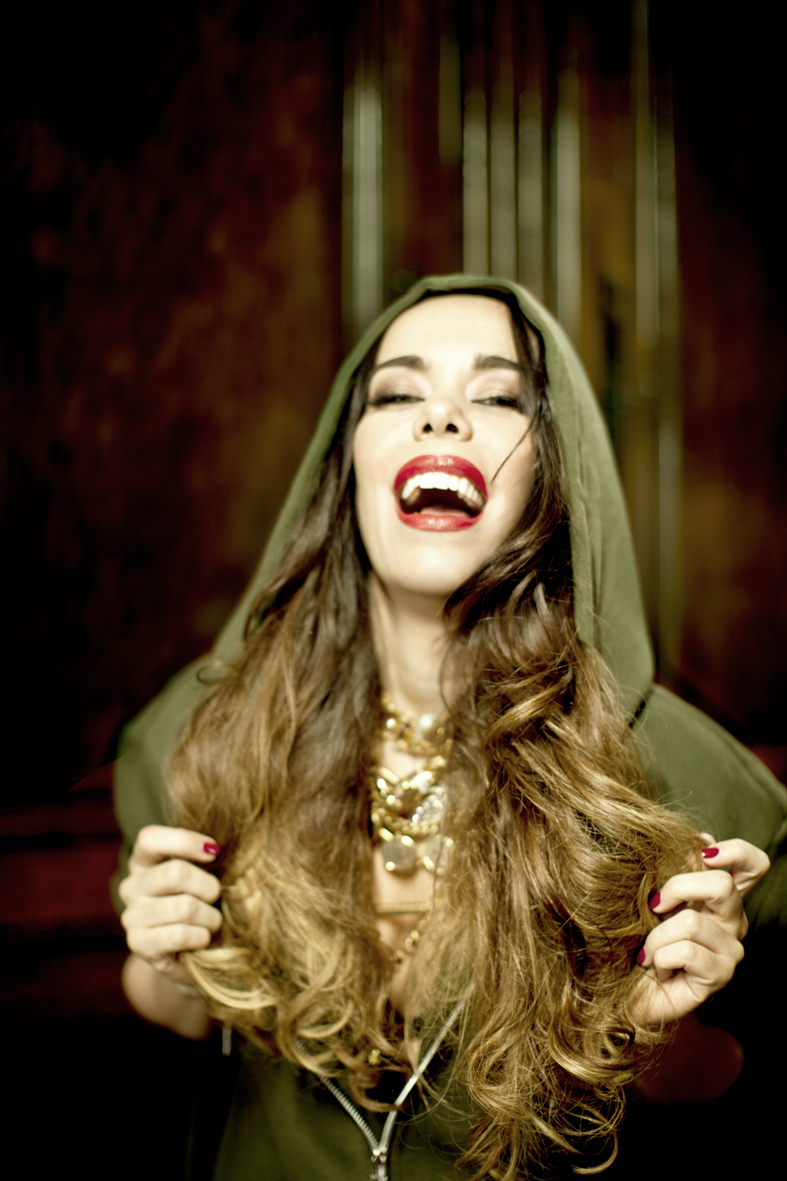
- Luengo in 2013
- Born: Beatriz Luengo González; 23 December 1982 (age 43); Madrid, Spain
- Occupations: Musician; actress; dancer; singer; entrepreneur
- Years active: 1993–present
- Spouse: Yotuel Romero (m. 2008)
- Children: 2
- Musical career
- Genres: Latin pop; pop; R&B; soul
- Instruments: Vocals, guitar, piano
- Labels: Universal; Sony
- Website: www.beatrizluengooficial.com

Beatriz Luengo González (born 23 December 1982) is a Spanish musician, composer, actress, dancer, singer and entrepreneur based in Miami. She gained international recognition by portraying Lola Fernández in the Antena 3 series One Step Forward (Spanish: Un paso adelante) and its spin–off musical group UPA Dance. Consisting of Luengo, Pablo Puyol, Miguel Ángel Muñoz, Mónica Cruz and Silvia Marty, UPA Dance released one studio album, UPA Dance, which reached number one at the Spanish Albums Chart and sold over 1.1 million units in Spain and France.

Following the ending of Un paso adelante, Luengo launched a solo career and released her debut studio album Mi generación in 2005, followed by BL (2006), Carrousel (2008) and Bela y sus moskitas muertas (2011). She also co–wrote the song "Más fuerte" for Cucu Diamantes and earned a Latin Grammy Award nomination for Best Alternative Song in 2009. In 2007 Beatriz Luengo won an EBBA Award.

== Early life and career ==
Beatriz Luengo was born in Madrid in December 1982. The daughter of Angelines and Juan, she grew up and lived in the district of Hortaleza. In her free time, she played on the district basketball team.

When she was six years old she began to be interested in show business, after seeing a TV broadcast of the musical film Cabaret starring Liza Minnelli, who became a role model. She trained at the Royal Academy of Dance, where she studied ballet, jazz dance, Funky and flamenco.

When she was ten, she formed a musical group called Tatu with two childhood friends. They recorded a CD but the record label went out of business and their debut album was not released. Disappointed, Luengo gave up attending casting calls. After months, she successfully auditioned as a dancer for the Rita and Miliki Circus.

She danced on different TV spots for Televisión Española and was the singer in the TV program Esto Me Suena. She performed in musicals such as La Magia de Broadway I and II, Annie, Jekyll & Hyde, Hermanos de Sangre, and Peter Pan. During her stage performances she had the chance to work with Luis Ramirez, musical directors Alberto Quintero and Cesar Belda, and choreographer Luka Yesi.

== Music career ==
=== Mi generación and BL: 2005–07 ===
In 2005 she released her debut solo album, Mi Generación, on the Universal Music label. It was recorded in Spain, Belgium, and the United States. The album is an R&B and pop album, mixing some flamenco beats.

In early 2005, she released the first single from the album, "Mi Generación", but it failed to make an impact on the Spanish charts, despite peaking at #4 on the Airplay chart.

The second single from the album was "Go Away", a song written by American Pop star Justin Timberlake, and peaked at #1 on the Spanish Singles Chart. The third and final single was "Hit Lerele", an R&B song which peaked at #4 in Spain.

The album peaked at #20 in Spain and sold in excess of 30,000 copies, a commercial failure for Luengo and her label. Mi Generación had an exclusive release in France via FNAC stores, and peaked at #4 on the FNAC Top 20 without any form of promotion.

She won the prize "Better Musical Future", and she was chosen by the Spanish audience to represent Spain at the "Wanadoo Discoveries" in Nice, where she placed second. She was nominated to the MTV European Music Awards celebrated in Lisbon. She was invited in 2005 to the Grammy Awards and in 2006 to Cannes Festival.

In 2006, after the success of "Un Paso Adelante" in France, Universal released an edition of Mi Generación there, called BL. The lead single was "Hit Lerele", which peaked at #14 in France with sales of more than 90,000 copies. The second single was "Escape", and did also well on the charts, peaking at #14, selling 90,000 copies.

The album was released in mid-2006, and peaked at #7, selling 130,000 copies and being certified as Gold. The third and final single from BL was the R&B song "May Yo Lo", featuring Ruzzo from Orishas. However, this was only a promo single for French music stations; it did well on some radio stations.

The album peaked at #58 on the European Top 100 Albums Chart, and the single "Hit Lerele" was a Top 50 hit on the European Hot 100 Singles Chart.

=== Carrousel and Bela y sus moskitas muertas: 2008–present ===
After three years outside the music scene, Luengo recorded a new album, Carrousel, in France in early 2008.

The album was produced by Yotuel Romero and Andres Levin, and Luengo wrote all the lyrics. The album is a mixture of various rhythms, from flamenco to R&B, adult contemporary and pop. The album was released on May 4, 2008, via Universal Music Spain.

Despite the success of the lead single, "Pretendo Hablarte", which peaked at #4 on the Spanish Singles Chart, the album only peaked at #25 on the Spanish Top 100 Albums Chart.

On September 20, 2011, Beatriz released Bela y Sus Moskitas Muertas. The album was released in Europe, USA, and Latin America. The album received rave reviews and was highlighted in the New York Times as "a whimsical and sensual mix of soft reggae-minded rock". Her first single from the album "Como Tú No Hay 2" reached the top of radio charts in the United States, Spain, and Argentina. The video for the single was nominated for Music Video of the Year at Univision's Premio Lo Nuestro Awards.

Bela y Sus Moskitas Muertas earned a nomination for the 2012 Latin Grammy Awards for Best Contemporary Pop Vocal Album.

== Other work ==
=== Television and film ===
Luengo had her first appearance in a feature film in Pasión Adolescente in 2000.

In television, she appeared in episodes of Spanish soap operas such as Robles Investigador Privado, Policías, Periodistas, and El Comisario. In 2001, Luengo starred in the TV series Un paso adelante, which made her well known in Spain, Europe, and some South American countries; it was here that the musical group Upa Dance was born. Upa Dance sold more than 600,000 copies of their first record.

In October, 2016 she became one of the contestants of the Spanish musical impersonation show Tu cara me suena.

=== Entrepreneurship ===
Luengo owns a dance school in her native Madrid, The Beatriz Luengo School, where alumni are taught modern dance, classical dance and Spanish dance.

== Personal life ==
Luengo is good friends with her Un paso adelante fellow Miguel Ángel Muñoz.

She has been dating Cuban musician and actor Yotuel Romero since September 2003 - she met him on the set of One Step Forward TV show. They married on 6 November 2008. Yotuel Romero has a son, born in 1999 or 2000, from a previous relationship. On 20 August 2015, Luengo gave birth to her son, named Angelo .

== Discography ==
=== Studio albums ===
Year	Album	Charts			Certification
Year	Album	SP	FRA	EU	Certification
2005	Mi generación: Released: 14 February 2005; Label: Universal Music; Formats: CD, digital download	20	—	—	
2006	BL: Released: 17 April 2006; Label: Universal Music; Formats: CD, digital download	—	7	58	FRA: Gold
2008	Carrousel: Released: 20 May 2008; Label: Universal Music; Formats: CD, digital download	25	—	—	SP: 3× Platinum (digital)
2011	Bela y sus moskitas muertas: Released: 20 September 2011; Label: Universal Music; Formats: CD, digital download	37	—	—	
2018	Cuerpo y alma: Released: 18 May 2018; Label: Sony Music; Formats: CD, digital download	4	—	—	

=== Singles ===
Single	Year	Album	Charts						Certification
Single	Year	Album	SP	FRA	ARG	EU	US Latin	US Latin Pop	Certification
"Mi generación"	2005	Mi generación	9	—	—	—	—	—	
"Go Away"	2005	Mi generación	1*	—	—	—	—	—	
"Hit Lerele"	2006	BL	—	14	—	47	—	—	
"Pretendo hablarte"	2008	Carrousel	4	—	—	84	—	—	SP: Platinum
"Dime"	2009	Carrousel	10	—	—	38	—	—	SP: Gold
"Y solo fui"	2009	Carrousel	—	—	—	—	—	—	
"Se llama amistad"	2009	Non-album single	6	—	—	—	—	—	
"Como tú no hay 2" (featuring Yotuel)	2011	Bela y sus moskitas muertas	36	—	5	—	34	18	
"Ley de Newton" (featuring Jesús Navarro)	2012	Bela y sus moskitas muertas	—	—	—	—	46	17	
"Lengua" (featuring Shaggy)	2012	Bela y sus moskitas muertas	—	—	—	—	—	—	
"Más que suerte" (featuring Jesús Navarro)	2016	Non-album single	21	—	—	—	—	—	SP:Gold; MX:Gold
"Caprichosa" (featuring Mala Rodríguez)	2018	Non-album single	57	—	—	—	—	—	SP:Gold

== Filmography ==
Title	Title Translation	Year	Format	Role	Notes
El circo de Rita y Miliki	The Circus of Rita And Miliki	1993-1995	TV show	Herself	-
Periodistas	Journalists	2000	TV series	Candela	1 episode
Policías, en el corazón de la calle	Policemen, Of the Street by Heart	2000	TV series	Toñi	1 episode
Pasión adolescente	Adolescent Passion	2001	TV film	Mónica	
El comisario	The Commissioner	2001	TV series	Girl	2 episodes
Robles, investigador	Robles, Investigator	2001	TV series	Girl	1 episode
Un paso adelante	One Step Forward	2001-2005	TV series	Dolores "Lola" Fernández	84 episodes
La hora de José Mota	The Hour of José Mota	2009	TV series	Girl	1 episode
Tu cara me suena	Your Face Sounds Familiar	2016	Contest	Contestant	
UPA Next	UPA Next	2022-2023	TV series	Dolores "Lola" Fernández	8 episodes

== Stage credits ==
Title	Year	Production	Notes
Grease	1999	Lope de Vega Theatre, Madrid	
Peter Pan	1999	Lope de Vega Theatre, Madrid; Nuevo Apolo Theatre, Madrid	1999–2000
The Magic of Broadway I	1999	Lara Theatre, Madrid	
Jekyll & Hyde	2000	Lope de Vega Theatre, Madrid	
Blood Brothers	2000	Lope de Vega Theatre, Madrid	
The Magic of Broadway II	2000	Lara Theatre, Madrid	

== Awards and nominations ==
Award	Year	Category	Nominated work	Result
Latin Grammy Awards	2012	Best Contemporary Pop Vocal Album	"Bela y sus Moskitas Muertas"	Nominated
Cadena Dial Awards	2008	Best Spanish Artist	—N/a	Won
Latin Grammy Awards	2009	Best Alternative Song	"Más fuerte"	Nominated
Lo Nuestro Awards	2011	Music Video of the Year	"Como tú no hay 2"	Nominated
Los 40 Principales Awards	2008	Best New Artist	—N/a	Nominated
Los 40 Principales Awards	2008	Best Video	"Pretendo hablarte"	Nominated
Max Awards	1999	Best Theatre Debut	Peter Pan	Won
MTV Europe Music Awards	2005	Best Spanish Act	—N/a	Nominated
MTV Europe Music Awards	2007	Best Spanish Act	—N/a	Nominated
MTV Europe Music Awards	2008	Best Spanish Act	—N/a	Nominated
Orgullosamente Latino Awards	2010	Best Female Latin Artist	—N/a	Nominated
Pentagrama Awards	2008	Achievement in Culture	—N/a	Won
Spanish Music Awards	2005	Best New Act	—N/a	Won
