= Antifaz =

Studio album by Dayanara Torres
- Released: 1998 (US)
- Recorded: 1997–1998
- Genre: Latin pop
- Length: 52:13
- Label: Sony Discos
- Producers: Arturo F. Diaz; Don Stockwell

Singles from Antifaz
- 1. "Antifaz" Released: 1997; 2. "Mirame Bailando" Released: 1998; 3. "Jerigonza" Released: 1998

Antifaz is the first and only studio album by beauty queen turned actress and singer Dayanara Torres. The album was produced by Arturo Diaz and Don Stockwell under Tropix Music and distributed by Sony BMG. The first single was "Antifaz" which received huge airplay in Latin America and in the Philippines, though it did not match the success of the last single "Jerigonza" with Ivy Queen which peaked at numbers 17, 6 and 5 on the Billboard Hot Latin Songs, Latin Tropical Airplay and Latin Pop Airplay charts, respectively.

== Track listing ==
1. "And If Someday You Return" – 3:57 (James Stevens-Arce)
2. "Blue Shades" – 4:13 (Idalet Burgos)
3. "Antifaz" – 4:13 (Idalet Burgos)
4. "Volver A Volar" – 3:46 (Eduardo Reyes, Alejandro Montalbán)
5. "Magia" – 3:46 (featuring Stalin) (The Wizard)
6. "Luces De Neon" – 3:23 (Eduardo Reyes, Alejandro Montalbán)
7. "Mirame Bailando" – 3:30 (Eduardo Reyes)
8. "Mas Si Regresas" – 3:57 (James Stevens-Arce)
9. "Pidelo De Corazon" – 4:09 (Omar Alfanno)
10. "Fuego De Pasion" – 3:55 (Ruco Gandía)
11. "Jerigonza" – 3:57 (featuring Ivy Queen) (Dayanara Torres, María D'Lourdes, Eduardo Reyes)
12. "Disparame Tu Amor" – 3:55 (The Wizard)
13. "Amarilli Mia Bella" – 3:10 (Giulio Caccini)

Bonus tracks

14. "Antifaz Blue Eyes remix" – 6:31 (Idalet Burgos)
15. "Antifaz New York club remix" – 5:46 (Idalet Burgos)

== Personnel ==
- Vocals: Dayanara Torres
- Featuring: Ivy Queen, Stalin
- Trumpet: Gustavo López
- Trombone: Gamalier González
- Guitar: David Canals and Eduardo Reyes
- Background vocals: María D'Lourdes, David Canals, Marissa Alemán, Laura Reyes, Claudia Heredia, Miguel Omar Reyes and Julie Ann del Río

=== Production ===
- Musical production, arranger and programmer: Eduardo Reyes
- Additional production: DJ Sugar Kid
- Special collaboration: Gilberto Luciano
- Executive producers: Arturo F. Díaz and Don Stockwell
- Graphics design: Yania Olabarrieta
- Photographer: Eduardo Pérez
- Manager: Heather Rasch
- Management: Ooh La La Entertainment
