= Quien Dijo =

Single by Ivy Queen

Single by Ivy Queen

from the album Raiz No Rama
- Released: August 5, 2022
- Recorded: in Miami
- Genre: Bachata
- Length: 4:01
- Label: NKS Music
- Songwriters: Martha Pesante, David Pinto
- Producers: Jorgie Milliano, Melvin War

Ivy Queen singles chronology
| "Pa' Mí" (2022) | "Quien Dijo" (2022) | "Villana" (2022) |

"Quien Dijo" is a song by Puerto Rican reggaetón recording artist Ivy Queen. The song was written by Queen and David Pinto and released as a stand-alone single on August 5, 2022. It is a bachata song incorporating trap music elements.

The song was met with positive reception from media outlets who praised the song's musical and lyrical composition. It peaked at number 17 on the Billboard Tropical Airplay chart.

== Composition ==
It is a bachata song. During composition of the song Queen selected the melody first, later incorporating the bachata elements while recording. Musically, she enlisted the help of Grammy nominated Dominican-American percussionist, Joel Rodríguez. She also utilized Dominican-American producer/artist and guitarist, Melvin Guerra (Known as Melvin War); Dominican-America Bass player Joel Hernandez; Dominican-American keyboard/synth player and producer Kelvin Guerra (known as Soundsbymoon), as well as a Puerto Rican-Cuban who composed the rap melody.

== Release and promotion ==
Queen premiered the song on the Spanish-language morning television program ¡Despierta América!.

== Critical reception ==
According to the Puerto Rican magazine El Vocero, "displays her versatility without abandoning her roots." Metro Puerto Rico, a digital news outlet shared similar sentiments toward the song.

Billboard magazine's Leila Cobo selected the song as one of the best new Latin songs, albums, and videos for the week of August 5, 2022. Cobo praised Queen's effort into bachata as "stylized," while noting the softened use of synths and strings. She described it as an "intriguing combination of edge and sweetness." According to Cobo the song "displays her vocal chops to chastise a man who doesn’t value her love." Lucas Villa for Latina magazine also selected the song among that week’s best new releases, describing it as an "emotional rollercoaster of a track" and "heartbreak anthem."

== Chart performance ==
| Chart (2022) | Peak Position |
|---|---|
| US Tropical Airplay (Billboard) | 17 |
