= The Noise (band) =

Puerto Rican collective of DJs, rappers, and music producers

- Origin: Puerto Rico
- Genres: Dancehall; Reggaeton; Hip hop
- Years active: Early 1990s—2004
- Labels: Sony Music Latin; House of Music
- Past members: Vico C; Baby Rasta & Gringo; Bebe; Baby Ranks; DJ David; DJ Negro; DJ Nelson; Don Chezina; Ivy Queen; Las Guanabanas; Point Breakers; Trébol Clan; Tony Touch

The Noise was a Puerto Rican collective of DJs, rappers, and producers who performed at a club, by the same name in San Juan, Puerto Rico. It included many of Puerto Rican performers, some of whom would later find solo success, including Vico C, Baby Rasta & Gringo, Baby Ranks, DJ David, DJ Negro, DJ Nelson, Don Chezina, Ivy Queen, Las Guanabanas, Point Breakers, Trébol Clan, Tony Touch.

== Background ==
In 1985, the club opened in Puerto Rico. Originally, the club was a "venue where DJs and club-goers could enjoy rap, dancehall reggae, and tropical styles popular at the salsa, particularly. Around 1992, the collective's producers began producing beats for the artists to perform to live at the club.

== Musical career ==
=== 1990-1996: Establishment ===
Puerto Rican singer Ivy Queen joined the then all-male group in 1995. Queen "made her first appearance on the fifth installment of The Noise CD series with a track called "Somos Raperos Pero No Delincuentes." Queen grew increasingly tired of the violent and explicit sexual lyrics," later releasing her debut studio album En Mi Imperio in 1996.

=== 1997-2000: Rise in popularity ===
In 1997, The Best Greatest Hits was released. It reached number eight on the Billboard Latin Albums chart. It also peaked at number five on the Billboard Latin Pop Albums chart. Later that same year, The Noise, Vol. 8: The Real Noise was released. It reached number twelve and number six on the Billboard Latin Albums and Billboard Latin Pop Albums charts, respectively.

=== 2018: Reunion ===
In May 2018, the group held a reunion concert at New York’s Red Bull Festival. The proceeds of the event were donated to the “Rock Steady for Life” campaign, benefiting victims of Hurricane Maria in Puerto Rico.

== Members ==
=== Former members ===
- Baby Rasta & Gringo
- Baby Ranks
- DJ David
- DJ Negro
- DJ Nelson
- Don Chezina
- Ivy Queen (joined 1993, went solo in 1996)
- Las Guanabanas
- Point Breakers
- Trebol Clan
- Tony Touch
- Polaco
- Bebe
- Kin Kane

== Discography ==
=== Studio albums ===
- The Noise, Vol. 1: Underground (1991)
- The Noise 2 (1994)
- The Noise 3 (1995)
- The Noise 4 (1995)
- The Noise 5: Back to the Top (1995)
- The Noise 6: The Creation (1996)
- The Noise 7: Bring the Noise (1997)
- The Noise 8: The Real Noise (1997)
- The Noise 9: Antes del Final (1999)
- The Noise 10: The Last Noise (2004)

=== Live albums ===
- The Noise Live (1996)
- The Noise Live 2: Anniversary Centro de Convenciones (1998)

=== Compilation albums ===
- The Best Greatest Hits (1997)
- The Noise: The Beginning (2001)
- The Noise: La Biografía (2003)
