= La Liga Femenina =

Compilation album by Boy Wonder and Charlee Way
- Released: March 6, 2026
- Recorded: 2025
- Genres: Urbano; reggaeton; Latin trap
- Length: 49:36
- Language: Spanish
- Labels: Chosen Few Emerald; Bravas
- Producers: Boy Wonder; Charlee Way; Champion Sound; Aixzakku; Izon; Jorgie Milliano; Karl Palencia; Kino TTF; Myztiko; Salvador Morales; Sons of Sonic

Boy Wonder and Charlee Way chronology
Chosen Few Dembow (2026)	La Liga Femenina (2026)

Singles from La Liga Femenina
- 1. "Se Vale To" Released: January 21, 2026; 2. "100" Released: February 6, 2026; 3. "Nota Eleva" Released: February 18, 2026; 4. "Cria y Calle" Released: March 4, 2026

La Liga Femenina (English: The Female League) is a compilation album presented by Boy Wonder and Charlee Way. Published by the former's record label, Chosen Few Emerald Entertainment and newly launched Bravas Entertainment, the album is entirely performed by female artists from the Urbano music genre. It was released on March 6, 2026, and contains 19 tracks by 19 artists including Puerto Rican rapper Ivy Queen, Spanish rapper La Mala Rodriguez and American singer Mariah Angeliq, among others.

The album's pre-release was supported by four singles: "Se Vale To" by Nesi, Mala Rodriguez' "100", Mariah Angeliq's "Nota Eleva" and "Cria y Calle" performed by Ivy Queen, with the latter serving as the lead single for the set. The remaining tracks of the album were all released as digital singles as well. Musically, the album spans several sub-genres of Latin urban music including reggaeton, trap, afrobeats and electronica.

== Background ==
Ivy Queen first planned to release a concept album which would include duets with female recording artists from different genres in 2006. The album entitled Drama Queen, was later released in July 2010 as her seventh studio album, following the release of Sentimiento (2007).

Following the 2024 releases of La Liga: First Picks and La Liga 2: Second Quarter, two compilation albums with solely male performing artists, Boy Wonder and Charlee Way decided to work on an album featuring only female performing artists. Recording sessions for the album included over 30 female artists with only 19 being selected for the final track list. Charlee Way, in an interview with Spanish news agency EFE, revealed that he felt the included artists were among the best talents from each of their respective countries. It is the first Urbano music album performed entirely by female artists to be released.

== Promotion ==
The album was announced during the 2025 Billboard Latin Women in Music awards ceremony that April, with an original release scheduled for summer of 2025. During the launch of Bravas Entertainment, a new hub for female artists, offering "services in music distribution, public relations, creative production, digital strategy, networking and professional mentoring," it was revealed that La Liga Femenina would be the first project released under the label.

"Se Vale To", performed by Puerto Rican singer Nesi was selected as the first single for the album and was released on January 21, 2026. Mala Rodriguez' "100" was selected as the second single and was released on February 6, 2026. The third single, "Nota Eleva" by Mariah Angeliq was released on February 18, 2026. The fourth single, "Cria y Calle" performed by Ivy Queen was released on March 4, 2026. The remaining tracks of the album were released as digital singles on March 5, 2026

== Composition ==
The opening number of the set, "Se Vale To" by Puerto Rican singer Nesi, interpolates Calle 13's "Se Vale To-To" from their self-titled debut studio album, released in 2005. Mariah Angeliq's "Nota Eleva" is a "sultry pop-infused track" describing a toxic love interest. "Cria y Calle" performed by Ivy Queen appears as track number five on the album. Lyrically, Queen boasts about her success in the music industry. Sonically, the song departs from Ivy Queen's usual hard-hitting reggaeton tracks with a newer and more polished sound. Billboard called the song as "an edgy, futuristic-like reggaeton." Rolling Stone described the song as a "boastful declaration over a fiery reggaeton beat."

== Track list ==
All songs credit Boy Wonder and Charlee Way. Track listing adapted from YouTube Music.

No.	Title	Performer	Length
1.	"Se Vale To"	Nesi	3:07
2.	"100"	Mala Rodríguez	2:28
3.	"Nota Eleva"	Mariah Angeliq	2:50
4.	"Bugutu"	Bellakath and Playero	2:33
5.	"Cria y Calle"	Ivy Queen	2:20
6.	"Coco Loco"	Ysa C	2:54
7.	"No Da Nota"	J Noa	2:55
8.	"Tocame"	Loyaltty	2:40
9.	"Lonely" (with Francesca Ramirez)	Chesca	2:24
10.	"Kemzo"	Valentina Olguin	2:45
11.	"To The Top"	Amara La Negra	2:58
12.	"Arriésgate"	Vale Pintos	2:45
13.	"Naturola"	Chelsy	2:03
14.	"Mi Loca"	Babywine	2:27
15.	"Baddie"	Queen Parker	2:21
16.	"Montala"	Irania	2:28
17.	"Freaky"	Keyshita	3:01
18.	"Fogo Lento"	Naddia	2:29
19.	"Salió Con Raras"	Soley	2:08
Total length:			49:36
