= Amantes o Amigos =

Single by Khriz John

from the album El Repretorio - The Mixtape
- Released: 8 February 2011
- Recorded: 2011
- Genre: Reggaetón
- Length: 3:14
- Label: La Fama Records
- Songwriter(s): Engels Luis Castillo, Hansen O. Castillo, Hiram Cruz
- Producer(s): Keko Musik

Khriz John singles chronology
"Amantes o Amigos" (2011)	"Ella Me Amenaza" (2011)

"Amantes o Amigos" is a song by Puerto Rican recording artist Khriz John. It was released as John's debut single on 8 February 2011. The official remix, which features vocals performed by Puerto Rican recording artist Ivy Queen, was released on 10 June 2011.

== Charts ==
Chart (2011)	Peak
US Latin Rhythm Songs (Billboard)	25
