= Hit Lerele =

Single by Beatríz Luengo featuring Ivy Queen

from the album Beatríz Luengo
- Released: 6 June 2006
- Recorded: 2006
- Genre: R&B
- Length: 4:12
- Label: Mercury, Universal
- Songwriter(s): Antonio Carmona, Samuel Medina, Jan Nilson, Martha Pesante, Yotuel Romero
- Producer(s): Yotuel Romero

Beatríz Luengo singles chronology
| "Go Away" (2005) | "Hit Lerele" (2006) | "Escape" (2006) |

"Hit Lerele" is a song performed by Spanish recording artist Beatríz Luengo. It was released as the lead single from Luengo's self-titled second studio album on 6 June 2006. The song features vocals performed by Puerto Rican recording artist Ivy Queen. The song was released exclusively in France along with the second single off the album, "Escape". The song has sold over 90,000 copies in France alone.

== Background ==
Following the release of her debut studio album, Mi Generación in 2005 and its failed commercial impact, Luengo moved to France where she began recording material for her second studio album.

== Track listing ==
| No. | Title | Writer(s) | Producer(s) | Length |
|---|---|---|---|---|
| 1. | "Hit Lerele" | Antonio Carmona, Samuel Medina, Jan Nilson, Martha Pesante, Yotuel Romero | Yotuel Romero | 4:12 |
| 2. | "Escape" | | Yotuel Romero | 3:27 |
| Total length: | | | | 7:39 |

== Charts ==
| Chart (2006) | Peak |
|---|---|
| France (SNEP) | 14 |
| US European Hot 100 Singles (Billboard) | 47 |
