= Pa' Mí =

Single by Peter Nieto and Ivy Queen

Single by Peter Nieto and Ivy Queen
- Released: April 22, 2022
- Recorded: in Miami
- Genre: Salsa
- Length: 3:50
- Label: Diamond Music
- Songwriters: Peter Nieto, Martha Pesante
- Producer: Jay Lugo

Peter Nieto and Ivy Queen singles chronology
"Camuflash" (2021)	"Pa' Mí" (2022)	"Quien Dijo" (2022)

"Pa' Mí" (For Me) is a song by Cuban recording artist Peter Nieto and Puerto Rican recording artist Ivy Queen. The song was written by Queen and Nieto and released as a stand-alone single on April 22, 2022. It is a salsa song incorporating reggaeton music elements. The song peaked at number 19 on the Billboard Tropical Airplay chart.

At the Premios Tu Música Urbano of 2022, the song was nominated for Top Urban Tropical Song. The song also received a nomination for Top Tropical Collaboration at the 19th Annual Premios Juventud.

== Composition and recording ==
The song is performed in the salsa genre with urban music elements, being written by Nieto and co-produced by Jay Lugo. The songs lyrics express wanting to be with someone who is already taken.

== Chart performance ==
Chart (2022)	Peak Position
US Tropical Airplay (Billboard)	19
