= Mikey Perfecto =

Puerto Rican reggaeton musician

- Born: Miguel A. Soto Cordova; Brooklyn, New York, US
- Occupations: Rapper, singer-songwriter, record producer, recording artist
- Musical career
- Genres: Hip hop, reggaeton
- Instrument: Vocals
- Years active: 1998–present
- Labels: RMM, Sony Music, Soprano, Machete Music

Miguel A. Soto Cordova, also known as Mikey Perfecto, is a Puerto Rican reggaeton musician. He was first thrust into the music scene as the lead vocal, leader, and songwriter for the Latin urban music group, 3-2 GET FUNKY. With 3-2 Get Funky, Mikey Perfecto recorded 5 studio albums from 1993 to 1998. He recorded his first solo album in 1999, "Angel Perdido", a mixture of salsa, hip hop, and reggaeton urban music. His second studio album Evolucion Arrestada (2004) reached number nineteen on the Billboard Tropical Albums chart. The lead single "La Matadora" featuring fellow recording artist Daddy Yankee reached number thirty-five on the Billboard Tropical Songs chart. Perfecto was featured on Cuban singer Celia Cruz's 2002 hit single "La Negra Tiene Tumbao". It reached number thirty on the Billboard Latin Songs chart and number four on the Billboard Tropical Songs chart. The song received nominations for Record of the Year, Song of the Year, and Music Video of the Year at the Latin Grammy Awards of 2002. The parent album won the Latin Grammy Award for Best Salsa Album. It was nominated for Album of the Year. The song was also nominated Tropical Song of the Year at the 2003 Lo Nuestro Awards. Mikey Perfecto whose real name is Miguel Angel Soto Cordova, obtained a master's degree in Social Work and a Doctoral degree in Clinical Social Work from the Doctorate Program of the Interamerican University Of Puerto Rico. He is the author of the Book "En Cuerpo y Alma" (La Autobiografía de Mikey Perfecto) where he details his struggles and challenges during the first wave of Puerto Ricos’ urban artist movement. He currently works with troubled youth, and communities afflicted by poverty, addiction, and other obstacles produced by these conditions.

== Discography ==
- Ángel Perdido (1999)
- Evolución Arrestada (2004)
- Cuando El Silencio Hace Ruido (2007)
- En Cuerpo y Alma (2008)
- Mi Día Mas Feliz (2019)
