= Domingo Quiñones =

Puerto Rican singer

Domingo Quiñones is a singer of salsa music. He is also a composer, producer and actor.

Domingo Quinones was born on August 9, 1963, in Perth Amboy, New Jersey. When he was four years old he moved to Puerto Rico with his parents and lived in Ceiba, Puerto Rico. He returned to New York City in 1977. He began his career there six years later with the Conjunto Nativo. He also performed with other groups, including the orchestra of Rafael de Jesús, with José Alberto "El Canario", with Johnny Rodriguez and the Conjunto Clásico.

In 1985 he replaced Roberto Lugo in the orchestra of Luis "Perico" Ortiz with whom he recorded four albums, including La vida en broma (1985), In Tradition (1986) and Perico (1987). He then sang for a time with Louie Ramirez and Roberto Roena.

In 1990, he signed as a solo artist with RMM and released his first solo album: Domingo es mi nombre. After joining Tito Puente on his 100th record, Quiñones released his second solo album Pintando Lunas. That album included a duet entitled "Dos Amigos" with Tony Vega and a salsa version of the song "Crazy for You" which proved his great versatility.

This was followed by six additional recordings with RMM. His 1996 album, "Mi Meta", included the single "Tu Como Estas" ("How are you"), his first #1 single on the Latin Tropical Airplay chart. The follow-up album, "Se necesita un milagro", selected as one of the most influential albums by the National Foundation for Popular Culture of Puerto Rico. Among his many popular songs was "Mi Negrita Me Espera". The lead single, "No Voy a Dejarte Ir" ("I'm not letting you go") became a hit on the Latin Tropical Airplay chart peaking at #2.

In 1998, he demonstrated his acting abilities in the rock opera Jesus Christ Superstar, together with Olga Tañón, Michael Stuart and Tito Auger of the music group Fiel à la Vega. This was followed by playing the role of the legendary singer Héctor Lavoe in the New York play, Quien Mato a Héctor Lavoe? with songs like "La Voz de Siempre". The play and his performance won kudos from the critics including The New York Times, proclaiming that Quiñones captured the very essence of Lavoe's life and music.

He returned to producing music recordings with the release of Poeta y guerrero which included his own compositions. But his acting days were not over yet as he won the role of Sgt. Miller in the movie Héroes de Otra Patria, about Puerto Rican soldiers in the Vietnam War. The film won Honorable Mention in the Festival de Cine de Viña del Mar (Chile) and was the official entry from Puerto Rico in the foreign film category of the 1999 Oscar competition. His more recent film roles included that of a San Juan music promoter in the Jennifer Lopez and Marc Anthony film El Cantante (2007).

On March 9, 2011, after feeling off in the afternoon, the singer was taken to UPR Hospital where he was later referred to the Rio Piedras Medical center. It was discovered that Domingo had suffered a mild stroke. He remained alert and retained use of his hands.

On August 14, 2020, Domingo Quiñones was the featured singer on Norberto Vélez's YouTube channel titled "Sesiones Desde La Loma Ep. 11".
