= Dayanara Torres =

Puerto Rican actress and model (born 1974)

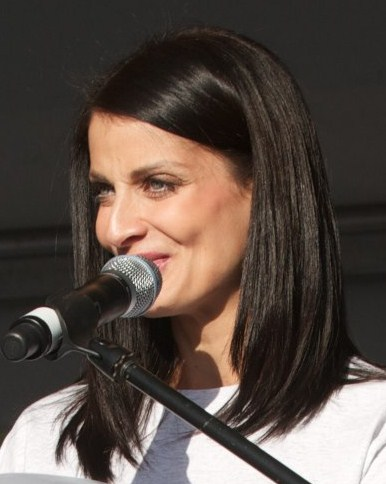
- Torres in 2011
- Born: Dayanara Torres Delgado; October 28, 1974 (age 52); Toa Alta, Puerto Rico
- Occupations: Actress, dancer, singer, model, writer
- Height: 173 cm (68 in)
- Spouse: Marc Anthony (m. 2000; div. 2004)
- Children: 2
- Beauty pageant titleholder
- Title: Miss International Puerto Rico 1992; Miss Puerto Rico 1993; Miss Universe 1993
- Hair color: Dark Brown
- Eye color: Blue
- Major competitions: Miss International 1992 (Top 15); Miss Puerto Rico 1993 (winner); Miss Universe 1993 (winner); Mira Quien Baila (winner)

Dayanara Torres Delgado (Latin American Spanish pronunciation: [daʝaˈnaɾa ˈto.ɾes]; born October 28, 1974) is a Puerto Rican actress, dancer, singer, model, and beauty queen who won the Miss Universe 1993 pageant and she was the third Puerto Rican to win Miss Universe since Marisol Malaret in 1970 and Deborah Carthy Deu in 1985.

Torres was discovered at age 17 while walking through the Plaza de Toa Alta in her hometown, and was invited to represent Toa Alta in the annual Miss Puerto Rico pageant. She won the pageant and the right to represent Puerto Rico in the 1993 Miss Universe pageant. In 1992, she participated in the Miss International pageant and became a semi-finalist. The same year, she earned second place at the Queen of the World contest.

Torres won the crown in the Miss Universe pageant held in Mexico in May 1993. Torres's victory in the pageant caused some controversy because of the claim that she was still a minor; however, Torres had turned 18 several months before the contest. When Torres returned home to Puerto Rico, she was received with a parade.

During and after her reign as Miss Universe, she became an ambassador for UNICEF, traveling through Asia and Latin America in support of the organization. She created the Dayanara Torres Foundation which has provided scholarships to poor students in Puerto Rico and the Philippines. In 1994, she went to Manila to crown the new Miss Universe and during the ceremony; she sang "A Whole New World" as a duet with Peabo Bryson.

== Career ==
=== Torres in the Philippines ===
After the 1993 Miss Universe pageant, Torres landed several film roles, made television appearances, and received offers to endorse products. She became a celebrity in the Philippines and lived in the country for five years. During her time in the Philippines, Torres learned to speak Tagalog. Torres endorsed Pantene shampoo in 1998-1999.

She appeared in more than 10 films, including Hataw Na, a film with Filipino actor and singer Gary Valenciano (who is half-Puerto Rican). During that time, she also filmed Linda Sara (1994), a Puerto Rican film directed by Jacobo Morales in which she was paired with fellow Puerto Rican singer, Chayanne. She also became a staple figure on Philippine television every Sunday on the show ASAP Mania, where her dancing skills gained her the informal title "Dancing Queen".

=== Return to Puerto Rico ===
Torres returned to Puerto Rico in 1998 and as a singer released her only album titled Antifaz. It reached the top of the Billboard charts in Latin America. She also starred in several theater productions on the island. That same year, a "Dayanara" doll was released and sold out in both Puerto Rico and the Philippines.

On September 1, 2005, Torres debuted in an American soap opera, playing a small role in The Young and the Restless. The program's producers expressed an interest in future appearances. To date, Torres has not made any other appearances on the show. Torres later starred in Watch Over Me, a MyNetworkTV primetime drama.

In 2008, Torres was included in People magazine's "Most Beautiful People" list. During the celebration ceremony, Torres stated she authored the self-help book Married to Me when she failed to find a book to help her with her 2003 separation from Marc Anthony in bookstores.

=== Return to the Philippines ===
In 2017, Torres returned to the Philippines to serve as a judge for Miss Universe 2016, along with guest appearances on Philippine television.

In February 2017, Torres was asked if she could appear on a romantic TV series with her former boyfriend and leading man Aga Muhlach; she said she was more than willing to do so.

== Personal life ==
Torres has two older brothers, José and Joey, and a younger sister, Jeannette. Upon completion of her high school studies at Colegio Santa Rosa in Bayamón, Torres expressed interest in going to dentistry college to become an orthodontist.

While living in the Philippines, Torres was in a five-year relationship with Filipino actor Aga Muhlach; Torres and Muhlach met on the set of her first Philippine film, Basta't Kasama Kita ("As Long as I'm with You").

Torres married singer Marc Anthony on May 9, 2000, in Las Vegas, Nevada. The marriage resulted in two sons, Cristian Anthony Muñiz (b. February 5, 2001) and Ryan Anthony Muñiz (b. August 16, 2003). Their marriage was allegedly "rocky", and the two separated, after just two years of marriage, in summer 2002. They later reconciled and renewed their vows in a ceremony in Puerto Rico in December 2002.

The couple's final separation came a year later in October 2003, with Torres filing for divorce in January 2004. The divorce was finalized June 1, 2004.

In June 2014, a judge ruled in Torres's favor by approving a doubling of Anthony's monthly child support payments (from $13,400 to $26,800); Torres initially sought $123,426 when it was alleged that Anthony spent only 35 days with their children in 2012, but the court discovered that he spent 71 days with them.

On February 4, 2019, Torres announced that she was diagnosed with skin cancer. In February 2020, she announced her completion of the last session of her radiation treatment, and shared a month later that she was cancer-free.

== Accolades ==
- Press Club of the Philippines 1995 (a.k.a. PMPC Star Awards for TV) – "Best New TV Personality Award" for ASAP on ABS-CBN (winner)
- Premios Juventud 2006 – "Chica Que Me Quita El Sueño" (winner)
- Premios Juventud 2007 – "Supermodelo Latina" (winner)
- Premios Juventud 2008 – "Quiero Vestir Como Ella / Ella Tiene Estilo" (nominated)
- Leading Ladies of Entertainment in 2019.

== Discography ==
Album

- Antifaz (1998)

== Filmography ==
=== Film ===
Year	Title	Role
1994	Linda Sara	Young Sara
1995	Basta’t Kasama Kita	Princess Marinella of Bavaria / Ella
1995	Hataw Na	Anna Alvarado
1999	Type Kita… Walang Kokontra!	Isabel Torres
2009	The Nail: The Story of Joey Nardone	Amelia
2013	200 Cartas	Yolanda
TBA	Solo Para Mujeres: The Movie	Diana

=== Television ===
Year	Title	Role
1994	Maalaala Mo Kaya: Selyo	Diane
1995–1999, 2017	ASAP	Host
1995	Oki Doki Doc	Yari
1996–1997	Eezy Dancing	Host/dancer
1996	Access Hollywood	Herself
1999	La Cenicienta	Cenicienta
1999	Today with Kris Aquino	Herself
2005	The Young and the Restless	Elise Tomkins
2006	SOP	Guest performer
2006–2007	Watch Over Me	Julia Rivera
2017	Ang Probinsyano	Mariana Dela Vega
2017	Magandang Buhay	Herself
2017	It's Showtime	Herself
2017	Tonight with Boy Abunda	Herself
2017	Gandang Gabi Vice	Herself
2017	Miss Universe 2017	Judge
2017	Mira quién baila Season 5	Winner
2018	Mira quién baila Season 6	Judge
2022–2024	Dick Clark's New Year's Rockin' Eve	Puerto Rico host

== Books ==
- 2006 – Sonrisas Sanas y Hermosas de Ricky y Andrea (co-author with Steven Fink)
- 2008 – Married to Me: How Committing to Myself Led to Triumph After Divorce (co-author with her sister Jeannette Torres-Álvarez)
- 2009 – Casada Conmigo Misma: Como Triunfé Despues Del Divorcio (Spanish translation of her book Married to Me...)

== See also ==
- List of Puerto Ricans
- History of women in Puerto Rico

Awards and achievements
Preceded by (Puerto Rico) Johnny Lozada	Mira quién baila winner 2017	Succeeded by (Colombia) Greeicy Rendón
Preceded by (Namibia) Michelle McLean	Miss Universe; 1993	Succeeded by (India) Sushmita Sen
Preceded by Daisy García (Bayamón)	Miss Puerto Rico; 1993	Succeeded by Brenda Robles (Isabela)
Preceded by Lizaura Quiñones	Miss International Puerto Rico; 1992	Succeeded by Brenda Robles
