= Llego La Queen =

2019 EP by Ivy Queen

EP by Ivy Queen
- Released: 28 February 2019
- Genre: Reggaeton; hip hop; dancehall
- Length: 24:31
- Language: Spanish
- Label: La Commission
- Producer: Guelo Star; Jayko El Federal; Jorge Milliano

Ivy Queen chronology
Vendetta (2015)	Llego La Queen (2019)	The Way of Queen (2020)

Singles from Llego La Queen
- 1. "Pa'l Frente y Pa' Tras" Released: 7 February 2019

Llego La Queen (English: The Queen Is Here) is the seventh extended play by Puerto Rican reggaetón singer-songwriter Ivy Queen. It was released on 28 February 2019 by La Commission.

The EP was supported with the release of "Pa'l Frente y Pa' Tras" as the lead single. A music video for the song was also filmed and released. A music video for "Llego La Queen" was also filmed and released simultaneously with the EP.

== Background ==
In 2017, it was revealed that Queen was working on her next studio project entitled The Queen Is Here, with a release sometime in 2018. She appeared as a presenter at the 30th annual Lo Nuestro award show. It was her first appearance at the Lo Nuestro awards since the 2008 Lo Nuestro award show. She wore a transparent black dress, with many media outlets listing her as one of the best-dressed of the night. The color black was worn by attendees to bring attention to gender equality and sexual harassment within the music industry. At the award show, Queen, along with Dominican singer Milly Quezada presented Puerto Rican singer Olga Tañón with a special tribute for being the artist with the most Lo Nuestro award wins, where she acknowledged the recognition of women for their “strength, talent, and rights to physical integrity.”

== Recording and production ==
Recording sessions for the EP were held following requests on social media from her fans for Queen to release new music.

== Release and promotion ==
"Pa'l Frente y Pa' Tras" was selected as the lead single for the EP. It was released on 7 February 2019. The official music video for the song was filmed by Cinema Entertainment and released the next day. It has attained over one million views. A music video for "Llego La Queen" was filmed by Florida Film House and also released on 28 February 2019, where it has attained over four million views. A music video for "Y Tú" was directed by Juan Restrepo for X Boca Negra Films. It was released on 9 April 2019, where it has attained over 500,000 views.

== Musical composition ==
The album musically features mainly reggaeton music. Queen stated that her fans requested reggaeton songs on her social media accounts and that is what influenced the selection of genre for the recorded songs. On "The Queen Is Here," the EP's first track, Queen affirms her status as the "Queen of Reggaeton." Queen explained that although she occasionally performs other genres of music, she is the "Queen of Reggaeton." Jessica Roiz, an editor for the Spanish entertainment website pulsopop, called the song a "hymn which stuns with dramatic vocal while revealing with power" that the Queen has arrived. Lyrically, "Y Tú" details love and heartbreak, while "Baile Para Ti" features declarations of passion and seduction. Roiz claimed "Pa'l Frente y Pa' Tras" to be a "vigorous invitation to have a good time on the dancefloor." The song was produced by Queen, alongside Guelo Star.

== Critical reception ==
According to Roiz, the album displays Queen's "versatility and impeccable flow and style." Roiz also claimed that with this release "Queen continues to leave her mark and remains one of the most respected and admired artists by her peers in the industry." According to Suzette Fernandez for Billboard magazine, the EP is Queen's return to the musical world "on a mission to take the feminine movement to the next level." Jesus Alarcón, for Tidal, said the album was for Queen's female fans. Suzy Exposito for Rolling Stone called it "a knockout of an EP." The album was nominated for Female Album of the Year at the 2020 Premios Tu Música Urbano awards. Vibe included the album at number ten on their list of the Top 50 Latin Albums of 2019.

According to the Spanish magazine Siempre Mujer, "Pa'l Frente y Pa' Tras" is a song for female reggaeton lovers.

== Track listing ==
Llego La Queen
No.	Title	Writer(s)	Producer(s)	Length
1.	"The Queen Is Here"	Martha Pesante, Xavier Sanchez	Jayko El Federal	3:20
2.	"Llego La Queen"	Pesante, Sanchez	Jorge Milliano	3:49
3.	"Y Tú"	Pesante, Sanchez		3:33
4.	"Pa'l Frente y Pa' Tras"	Pesante, Sanchez, Jorge Echevarria, Jorge Alberto Erazo, Miguel de Jesus	Guelo Star, Jorge Milliano	4:30
5.	"Baile Para Ti"	Pesante, Sanchez	Jorge Milliano	3:35
6.	"Malvada"	Pesante, Sanchez	Jorge Milliano	3:30
7.	"Polvora"	Pesante, Sanchez	Jorge Milliano	2:14
Total length:				24:31

== Chart performance ==
Chart (2019)	Peak Position
US Latin Album Sales (Billboard)	13
