= Primer Aviso =

2024 single by Maria Becerra and Ivy Queen

Single by María Becerra and Ivy Queen
- Language: Spanish
- English title: "First Notice"
- Released: 29 February 2024
- Genre: Reggaeton
- Length: 3:03
- Label: Warner Latina
- Songwriter(s): María Becerra; Martha Pesante; Xavier Rosero
- Producer(s): XROSS

María Becerra singles chronology
"Lady Madrizzz (Remix)" (2024)	"Primer Aviso" (2024)	"Latte" (2024)

Ivy Queen singles chronology
"Juquia con el Alcohol (Remix)" (2024)	"Primer Aviso" (2024)	"Perdió" (2024)

"Primer Aviso" (Spanish for "First Notice") is a song by Argentine singer-songwriter María Becerra and Puerto Rican singer-songwriter Ivy Queen. It was written by Becerra, Queen and XROSS and produced by the latter. The song was released on 29 February 2024, as the lead single from her upcoming third studio album.

The song features additional vocals from J Balvin, Nicky Jam, Yandel, Zion, Guaynaa and Lola Indigo.

== Background and recording ==
During recording sessions, Becerra requested that Queen perform ad-libs on the song. Queen responded and told Becerra that she would not perform ad-libs and asked if Becerra would feature Queen on the track. Queen then sent a verse, identifying with the song's message. Queen revealed to Spanish digital media company mitú that the collaboration was a "memorable experience". She said she felt proud of Becerra and noted similarities between the two.

== Release and reception ==
The song was released on February 29, 2024 by Warner Music Latina. The music video was filmed in Argentina and Miami. It has attained over seventy million views on the video-sharing platform YouTube, as of September 2025.

Billboard selected the song among the best new Latin releases of the week, calling it "the team up we didn't know we needed." The Latin Times claimed the song to "shake up the world of Latin music," saying it is a powerful reggaeton collaboration.

== Chart performance ==
For the week of 16 March 2024, the song debuted at number 19 on the Argentina Hot 100, becoming that week's Hot Shot Debut. The song is Queen's first entry on the chart.

== Charts ==
Chart (2024)	Peak position
Argentina (Argentina Hot 100)	10
Argentina Airplay (Monitor Latino)	8
Argentina Latin Airplay (Monitor Latino)	7
Argentina National Songs (Monitor Latino)	5
Chile (Monitor Latino)	12
Chile Urban Airplay (Monitor Latino)	2
Costa Rica Urban Airplay (Monitor Latino)	9
Ecuador Urban Airplay (Monitor Latino)	12
Panama Urban Airplay (Monitor Latino)	12
Peru Urban Airplay (Monitor Latino)	7

== Credits ==
Credits are adapted from Tidal.

Composition and lyrics

- Martha Pesante — composer
- Maria Becerra — composer
- Xavier Rosero — composer

Vocals

- Ivy Queen — lead vocals
- Maria Becerra — lead vocals
- J Balvin — additional vocals
- Nicky Jam — additional vocals

Production and engineering

- Xaviero Rosero (XROSS) — producer, vocal producer, recording engineer
- Luis Barrera — mastering engineer, mixing engineer
- David Pinto — recording engineer

- Yandel — additional vocals
- Zion — additional vocals
- Guaynaa — additional vocals
- Lola Indigo — additional vocals
