= List of events at José Miguel Agrelot Coliseum =

José Miguel Agrelot Coliseum
- Coliseo de Puerto Rico José Miguel Agrelot
- The Choliseo
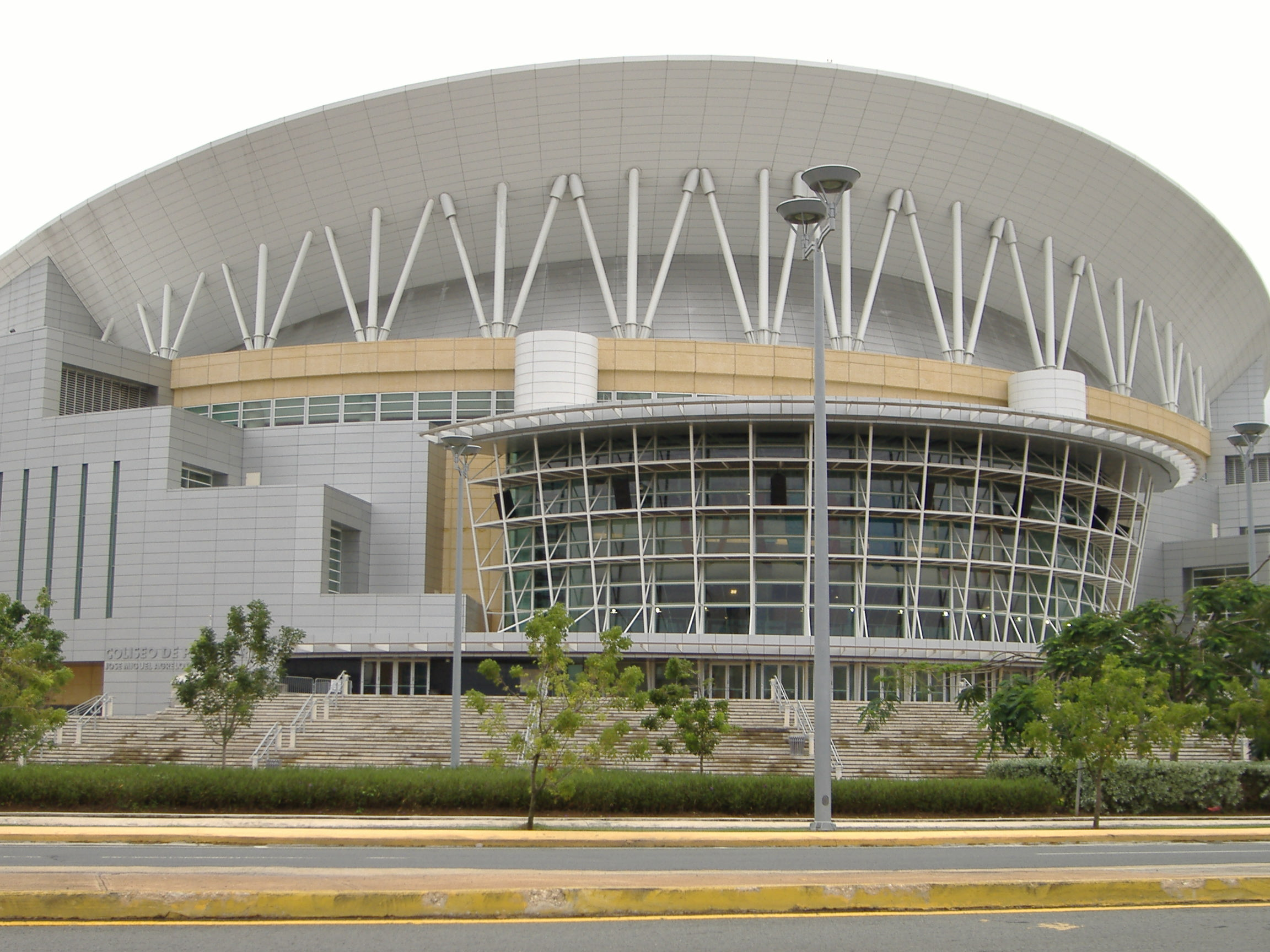
- Front of the José Miguel Agrelot Coliseum
- Interactive map of José Miguel Agrelot Coliseum
- Full name: José Miguel Agrelot Coliseum of Puerto Rico
- Address: 500 Arterial B St.
- Location: Hato Rey, San Juan, Puerto Rico
- Coordinates: 18°25′39.78″N 66°3′41.01″W
- Owner: Puerto Rico Convention Center District Authority
- Operator: ASM Global
- Seating type: Reserved seating
- Capacity: 18,500
- Executive suites: 2 party suites 26 corporate suites
- Type: Arena
- Events: Music, concerts, sporting events
- Surface: Concrete
- Scoreboard: Four-sided LED
- Record attendance: 18,749 – Bad Bunny: Un Verano Sin Ti (July 28, 2022)
- Field shape: Oval rectangular
- Public transit: Hato Rey Station; AMA C1 C22 D15 T2; AcuaExpreso: Hato Rey Terminal

Construction
- Groundbreaking: 1998
- Built: July 1998–2004
- Opened: September 4, 2004
- Cost: US$252.6 million
- Architects: Sierra Cardona Ferrer; HOK
- Project manager: Government of Puerto Rico
- Structural engineer: QB Construction

Tenants
- Puerto Rico men's national basketball team Cangrejeros de Santurce (BSN) (2004–2011; 2021); Puerto Rico Tip-Off (NCAA) (2007–2011)

Website
- www.coliseodepuertorico.com

The José Miguel Agrelot Coliseum of Puerto Rico (Spanish: Coliseo de Puerto Rico José Miguel Agrelot) is the biggest indoor arena in Puerto Rico dedicated to entertainment. It is located at the Golden Mile of San Juan, the island capital. It is usually referred by Puerto Ricans as the Choliseo, which is a portmanteau of the words "Coliseo" and "Cholito", in reference to Don Cholito, one of José Miguel Agrelot's characters and Agrelot's own adopted nickname.

The following is a list of noteworthy events that have taken place at the venue since its opening.

== 2004–2006 ==
=== Debuts in Puerto Rico ===
- Van Halen: September 13, 2004
- Andrea Bocelli: November 19, 2004
- Juanes: February 26–27, 2005
- Hilary Duff: November 13, 2005
- Nelly Furtado: October 29, 2005
- The Black Eyed Peas: November 17, 2005
- RBD: December 4, 2005
- Ringling Bros. and Barnum & Bailey Circus: December 14–18, 2005
- Usher, Lil Jon, Ludacris, Fat Joe, Beyoncé: April 4–5, 2006

=== Debuts at the venue ===
- Roberto Roena and his Apollo Sound, Papo Lucca and La Sonora Ponceña, Richie Ray & Bobby Cruz: September 4, 2004
- Draco Rosa: September 18, 2004
- Daddy Yankee: December 18, 2004
- National Basketball Association: October 14, 2005
- Megadeth: October 15, 2005
- Tommy Torres, Ricardo Montaner, Sin Bandera, Ednita Nazario: October 29, 2005
- La Secta Allstar : December 2, 2005
- Ricky Martin: February 18–19, 2006
- Luis Fonsi: April 7, 2006
- Ana Gabriel: May 12, 2006
- Gustavo Cerati: August 3, 2006. His first and only performance at the venue before his death.
- Laura Pausini: August 16, 2006
- R.K.M & Ken-Y: August 18, 2006. First sold-out performance of the duo.
- Chayanne: October 28, 2006
- Aerosmith, Vivanativa: November 26, 2006

=== Debuts as headliner ===
Artists who debuted at the venue as the main act, after having previously performed as part of a group, band or as a guest artist.

- La Secta Allstar: December 2, 2005
- Sting: April 27, 2006

=== Events ===
- September 4, 2004: Grand opening of the venue.
- January 9, 2005 (WWE New Year's Revolution 2005): second globally-broadcast WWE pay-per-view event held outside the mainland United States or Canada (following SummerSlam at Wembley Stadium in 1992). First pay-per-view event held at the venue.
- October 14, 2005 (NBA): First NBA game held at the venue, and fifth overall in Puerto Rico, where the Memphis Grizzlies defeated the Miami Heat in an exhibition match, 101–91.
- December 2, 2005 (La Secta Allstar): First Puerto Rican band to perform at the venue.
- February 11, 2006 (The Rolling Stones): established gross ticket sales record for a single show with $3.1 million.
- April 4–5, 2006 (Usher): concert performances filmed and broadcast for his live Showtime special One Night, One Star: Usher Live.
- June 6, 2006 (Ricardo Arjona): 1 millionth visitor.
- August 26, 2006 (AF2 Championship): one of the few professional arena football games played on the island and the first at the venue.
- September 23, 2006 (National Hockey League): first and only ice hockey game played on the island, where the New York Rangers won 3–2 against the Florida Panthers in a pre-season exhibition match.
- September 29–30, 2006 (Marc Anthony): two free-admission concert dates for the filming of El Cantante, which needed an audience.

== 2007–2009 ==
=== Debuts in Puerto Rico ===
- Elton John: April 28, 2007. His first and only performance in Puerto Rico before his retirement from touring. John originally would have debuted in Puerto Rico on April 15, 1995 at the Juan Ramón Loubriel Stadium but cancelled three days before the concert date.
- Papa Roach: November 29, 2007
- Il Divo: December 16, 2007
- Camila: June 7, 2008
- Demi Lovato: December 21, 2008
- Celine Dion: January 31, 2009
- Honor Society: March 22, 2009
- Coheed & Cambria: June 12, 2009
- The Killers: November 11, 2009

=== Debuts at the venue ===
- Jowell & Randy: June 2, 2007
- Ivy Queen: November 30, 2007
- Rod Stewart: August 30, 2008
- Jonas Brothers: March 22, 2009

=== Debuts as headliner ===
Artists who debuted at the venue as the main act, after having previously performed as part of a group, band or as a guest artist.

- Tommy Torres: January 24, 2009

=== Events ===
- April 2–6, 2008 (Disney on Ice): 2 millionth visitor. First ice-skating rink event held at the venue.
- April 27, 2008 (Popular Democratic Party of Puerto Rico): first political assembly held at the venue.
- December 4–10, 2008 (Aventura): most of their performances were sold out and became the band/artist to have sold more than three straight concert dates at the venue. This record would later be broken by Wisin & Yandel exactly ten years later.
- June 19, 2009 (University of Puerto Rico, Río Piedras Campus): first commencement ceremony held at the venue.
- September 4, 2009 (ECW/WWE SmackDown): fifth anniversary of the venue.
- October 10, 2009 (Gloria Estefan): 3 millionth visitor.

== 2010–2012 ==
=== Debuts in Puerto Rico ===
- Paul McCartney: April 5, 2010. First member of The Beatles to perform in Puerto Rico.
- Thirty Seconds to Mars: May 22, 2011
- Bruno Mars: September 8, 2011
- Evanescence: October 6, 2011
- Cirque du Soleil: October 19–23, 2011
- Britney Spears: December 10, 2011
- Enrique Bunbury: March 29, 2012
- Il Volo: April 28, 2012
- Andre Agassi, Pete Sampras: May 22, 2010
- Big Time Rush: August 26, 2012
- Lady Gaga: October 30–31, 2012
- Michel Telo: November 2, 2012
- Creed: December 8, 2012

=== Debuts at the venue ===
- Yolandita Monge: September 11, 2010
- Pitbull: November 2, 2012

=== Debuts as headliner ===
Artists who debuted at the venue as the main act, after having previously performed as part of a group, band or as a guest artist.

- Natalia Jiménez: March 10, 2012
- Jesse & Joy: October 27, 2012

=== Events ===
- March 14, 2010 (Metallica): fastest-selling concert at the venue and all of Puerto Rico and largest attendance for an arena stage concert with 17,286 spectators. This record would later be broken twice by Bad Bunny in March 2019 and July 2022.
- April 29, 2010 (2010 Billboard Latin Music Awards): first time the awards show is held outside the mainland United States. First awards show held at the venue.
- May 22, 2010 (Andre Agassi vs. Pete Sampras): first tennis match at the venue.
- January–August, 2011: Enrique Iglesias, Ricky Martin, Maná and Juan Luis Guerra began their respective 2011 world tours in Puerto Rico.
- June 17, 2011 (Maná): 4 millionth visitor.
- October–December, 2011: Shakira, Ricky Martin, Avenged Sevenfold and Britney Spears concluded their respective world tours in Puerto Rico.
- March 30–31, 2012 (Draco Rosa): marked his comeback after almost a year in cancer treatment.
- May 4–6, 2012 (Ednita Nazario): artist with the most number of shows performed at the venue. This record would later be broken twice by Wisin & Yandel in December 2018 and December 2022.

== 2013–2015 ==
=== Debuts in Puerto Rico ===
- Hillsong United: October 7, 2013
- Justin Bieber: October 19, 2013
- Óptimo: November 22, 2013
- Jerry Seinfeld: March 8, 2014
- Miley Cyrus: September 11, 2014
- Ringo Starr & His All-Starr Band: February 22, 2015. Second and final member of The Beatles to perform in Puerto Rico.
- Imagine Dragons: April 23, 2015
- Katy Perry: October 12, 2015
- Monster Jam: November 6–8, 2015

=== Debuts at the venue ===
- Luis Raúl: September 14, 2013. First stand-up comedian to perform at the venue and final stand-up of his career, before his death.
- Cafe Tacuba: September 21, 2013
- Fania All-Stars: October 18, 2013
- Atención Atención: March 23, 2014. Group's first sold-out concert as well as the first and only children's music group to debut at the venue.
- Farruko: March 29, 2014
- Tempo: May 17, 2014. Marked his stage return after completing his community work sentence.
- Cosculluela: September 19, 2014
- Beyond The Sun: October 18, 2014
- Zoé: October 25, 2014
- Bret Michaels: April 25, 2015
- Pedro Capó: June 5, 2015
- Juan Gabriel: March 1, 2015. Marked his final return to Puerto Rico after nearly 22 years of absence, before his death.

=== Debuts as headliner ===
Artists who debuted at the venue as the main act, after having previously performed as part of a group, band or as a guest artist.

- Richie Ray & Bobby Cruz: February 2, 2013
- Romeo Santos: February 14–15, 2013
- Pablo Alborán: February 16, 2013
- Antonio Orozco: May 11, 2013
- Víctor Manuelle: May 25, 2013
- Cano Estremera: August 17, 2013
- Beyoncé: September 28, 2013
- Gilberto Santa Rosa: February 8, 2014
- Prince Royce: March 7, 2014
- La Sonora Ponceña: May 25, 2014
- Yandel: October 4, 2014
- Plan B: November 14, 2014
- Wisin: December 5, 2014
- Zion & Lennox: February 7–8, 2015
- Tito el Bambino: March 13, 2015
- Christine D'Clario: March 28, 2015
- Charlie Aponte: June 6, 2015. Solo debut after departing El Gran Combo de Puerto Rico.
- Alex Zurdo: June 7, 2015
- Nick Jonas: August 9, 2015. First performance in Puerto Rico as a solo artist.
- Tego Calderón: August 28, 2015
- Nicky Jam: September 17–18, 2015
- De La Ghetto: November 13, 2015

=== Events ===
- May 3, 2013 (Don Omar): 5 millionth visitor. Marks the return of Don Omar to the venue after five years since his last concert there.
- September 1, 2013 (Bruno Mars): breaks record attendance at the venue, previously held by Aventura, with 16,691 spectators.
- September 14, 2013 (Luis Raúl): first stand-up comedy show at the venue, first show livestreamed over the Internet. His stand-up performance was made into a posthumous film, as per his last wishes.
- October 18, 2013 (Fania All-Stars): first show in Puerto Rico in more than 15 years since their last on the island. Premiered the first holographic projection on the island, "reviving" Héctor Lavoe and dancer Aníbal Vazquez, uncle of Roberto Roena.
- February 15, 2014 (Amor en la Hamaca): first Puerto Rican play to debut at the venue.
- June 27, 2014 (JuvenFilm Fest): first local film awards, recognizing short films created, produced and starred by youth of the public education system.
- September 4, 2014: tenth anniversary of the venue.
- April 11, 2015 (Orlando Salido vs. Rocky Martinez): first boxing match at the venue in nearly five years.
- June 20, 2015 (Def Leppard): marked the return of the band to Puerto Rico after nine years of absence.
- May 23, 2015 (Camila and Reik): marked the return to Puerto Rico of both bands after four years of absence and the first presentation of Camila in Puerto Rico after the departure of Samo from the group.
- December 3, 2015 (Daddy Yankee and Don Omar): first performance of both artists together after years of dispute. The first concert date sold out in less than 24 hours, setting a new sales record at the venue. The second concert date sells out completely in less than 12 hours, breaking the sales record set for the first concert date.

== 2016–2018 ==
=== Debuts in Puerto Rico ===
- CNCO: February 12–14, 2016
- Fall Out Boy: February 25, 2016
- Huey Lewis and The News: March 4, 2016
- Rafael Nadal, Víctor Estrella Burgos: March 21, 2016
- Anthrax: April 28, 2016
- Panic! at the Disco: October 28, 2016
- Maluma: November 19, 2016
- Ed Sheeran: June 4, 2017
- OneRepublic: June 11, 2017

=== Debuts at the venue ===
- Madonna: January 27–28, 2016. Marks her return to Puerto Rico after twenty two years of absence.
- Sie7e: February 6, 2016
- Baby Rasta & Gringo: March 5, 2016
- Fiel a la Vega: October 15, 2016
- Julieta Venegas: September 10, 2016
- Puerto Rico Philharmonic Orchestra: November 20, 2016
- J Balvin: March 8, 2017
- Arcángel & De La Ghetto: April 28, 2017
- Jorge Pabón "Molusco": May 20–21, 2017
- Jarabe de Palo: August 19, 2017
- Ozuna: September 15, 2017
- Phil Collins: March 27, 2018
- Camila Cabello: October 23, 2018. First performance in Puerto Rico as a solo artist.

=== Debuts as headliner ===
Artists who debuted at the venue as the main act, after having previously performed as part of a group, band or as a guest artist.

- Willie Colón: November 12, 2016
- CNCO: April 22, 2017

=== Events ===
- April 8, 2016 (Sin Bandera): marks the duo's return to the venue after almost nine years since their last performance, before their split.
- April 29, 2016 (Duran Duran): marks the band's return to Puerto Rico in ten years.
- September 17, 2016 (Laura Pausini): marks the singer's return to Puerto Rico in ten years.
- October 1, 2016 (Richie Ray & Bobby Cruz): marks the retirement of the duo.
- November 20, 2016 (Puerto Rico Philharmonic Orchestra): marks the debut of the first philharmonic orchestra to perform at the venue.
- April 28, 2017 (Arcángel & De La Ghetto): marks the duo's reunion and their debut at the venue.
- May 13, 2017 (Ednita Nazario): marked the 1,000th event held at the venue and the artist's 15th performance at the venue.
- May 20–21, 2017 (Jorge Pabón "Molusco"): marked the second time a stand-up comedy event was held at the venue by a Puerto Rican comedian. Also marked his debut at the venue to a sold-out two-date performance.
- September–December 2017: after the impact from Hurricane Maria, in the 2017 Atlantic hurricane season, events after mid September 2017 were cancelled. The Choliseo was used as a warehouse and collection center by the Government of Puerto Rico in order to prepare and distribute food, water and basic necessities to those affected by the deadliest and costliest hurricane in Puerto Rican history.
- March 27, 2018 (Phil Collins): marked the first sold-out concert at the venue since the impact of Hurricane Maria, which devastated Puerto Rico in September 2017.
- June–August 2018: Wisin & Yandel announce their first headlining tour since their five-year hiatus to take place at the venue in December 2018. Between June and August 2018, the duo managed to sell out a record-breaking 8-show headlining run at the venue; the first two shows sold out in record time in pre-sales.
- October 2018: Bad Bunny's first concert date, for March 8, 2019, sells out in a record two hours, the first for a Choliseo debut for any artist at the venue, who has had previous performances in Puerto Rico.
- November 30–December 9, 2018: Wisin & Yandel becomes the artist/duo with most performances at the Choliseo, previously held by Ednita Nazario, as well as the artist/duo with the most record-breaking sold-out dates than any other artist that has performed at the venue with 25, previously held by Aventura. They also broke the record of the highest number of tickets sold by any artist at the venue with 312,000 in a span of 15 years, since the venue first opened.

== 2019–2021 ==
=== Debuts in Puerto Rico ===
- Sarah Brightman: January 17, 2019
- Marvel Universe Live!: May 29–June 2, 2019
- César Millán: June 8, 2019

=== Debuts at the venue ===
- Rauw Alejandro: May 16, 2020
- In The Heights: September 16–26, 2021
- Karol G: November 27–28, 2021

=== Debuts as headliner ===
Artists who debuted at the venue as the main act, after having previously performed as part of a group, band or as a guest artist.

- Bad Bunny: March 8–10, 2019

=== Events ===
- March 9, 2019 (Bad Bunny): a new attendance record was broken with 18,000 spectators in an arena stage concert, a record previously held by Metallica nearly nine years prior. This record would be broken again by the rapper in July 2022.
- March 21, 2019: Telemundo debuts Premios Tu Música Urbano at the Choliseo and the venue becomes its permanent host. It is the third awards show held at the venue.
- September 4, 2019: fifteenth anniversary of the venue.
- September–December 2019: Daddy Yankee sells out 12 record-breaking dates between December 5–29, which marked his return to the Choliseo since his last headlining concert in 2005.
- March 2020–June 2021: due to the impact of the COVID-19 pandemic on the entertainment and the music industry, events at the venue were cancelled or postponed.
- May 16, 2020 (Rauw Alejandro): amid the worldwide COVID-19 pandemic, and after many major events at the venue were cancelled or postponed, Rauw Alejandro held a live concert at the Choliseo with no audience and livestreamed it over the Internet. His performance was originally scheduled for March 2020 at the Coca-Cola Music Hall but was cancelled due to the pandemic.
- May 20, 2021: after over a year since the COVID-19 pandemic impacted operations of the Choliseo, Governor Pedro Pierluisi announced major events at entertainment venues will be permitted to take place at an increased capacity, including the Choliseo. The announcement was made at the venue as part of many other modifications made to the existing executive order placed by his predecessor when the pandemic began.
- June 26, 2021 (Gilberto Santa Rosa): first public event at the Choliseo since the coronavirus pandemic began. The venue reopened to modified capacity as per an updated executive order for entertainment venues.
- September 16–26, 2021 (In The Heights): first musical theater production held at the venue, with an all-star Puerto Rican cast led by Ektor Rivera.
- December 10–11, 2021 (Bad Bunny): "P FKN R: The Ultimate Experience" was the first time a concert was presented via livestream at the Choliseo, while it was simultaneously being held in person at the Hiram Bithorn Stadium, less than two miles away from the venue. Bad Bunny would later appear in person at the Choliseo that same night to perform additional songs for the attendees.

== 2022–2024 ==
=== Debuts in Puerto Rico ===
- Feid: June 22–23, 2023
- Monica Puig, Venus Williams: September 15, 2023
- Michael Bublé: September 28, 2023
- Culture Club: January 13, 2024
- Travis Scott: September 18, 2024

=== Debuts at the venue ===
- Sech: April 10, 2022
- Louis Tomlinson: May 5, 2024
- Camilo: October 26, 2024

=== Debuts as headliner ===
Artists who debuted at the venue as the main act, after having previously performed as part of a group, band or as a guest artist.

- Myke Towers: April 20–22, 2022
- Tainy: January 5, 2024
- Carín León: August 10–11, 2024
- Grupo Firme: November 22–23, 2024
- Jerry Rivera: November 30, 2024

=== Events ===
- May 21, 2022 (Tommy Torres): ten millionth visitor.
- July 21, 2022 (2022 Premios Juventud): first time the awards show is held outside the mainland United States. It was held again at the venue for the following two consecutive years for its 20th and 21st annual ceremonies. It is the fourth awards show held at the venue.
- July 28, 2022 (Bad Bunny): the rapper establishes an all-time Choliseo attendance record of 18,749 spectators on the first night of his three-night performances, breaking a 2019 record by him as well. This new one was 249 spectators over the venue's capacity. This was the first time a concert was live-broadcast on national television in Puerto Rico, which was exclusively through the airwaves of Telemundo Puerto Rico.
- December 3–31, 2022 (Wisin & Yandel): the duo breaks various new records, some they've held as well. They headline the Choliseo for a 14-date run for the entire month of December 2022, a record previously held by Daddy Yankee, who had a 12-date run, December 2019. They break their own record again for most performances by an artist/duo at the Choliseo, increasing it to 39. Out of the duo's concert dates, nine shows were sold out in 24 hours, another record they previously broke. Their final concert date, December 31, 2022, marks the first time a concert is held at the Choliseo for New Year's Eve. This run marks the end of their farewell concert tour, La Última Misión World Tour.
- May 5–6, 2023 (WWE): two professional wrestling events, WWE SmackDown and Backlash 2023, took place at the venue for the first time since New Year's Revolution 2005 and the first time the venue hosted back-to-back WWE events. Bad Bunny made his Puerto Rico debut as a professional wrestler during both events.
- September 9, 2023 (Ivy Queen): marks her first concert in Puerto Rico in 15 years to a sold-out performance.
- September 15, 2023: for the first time since 2016, an exhibition tennis match is held at the venue, the third overall, between Monica Puig and Venus Williams. The match was originally scheduled to be held in 2016, with Puig against Serena Williams.
- October 12, 2023: Bad Bunny hosts the venue's first ever listening party for his album Nadie Sabe Lo Que Va a Pasar Mañana, which was released the following day.
- November 30–December 3, 2023: Daddy Yankee headlines the final performances of his reggaetón career, in a series of farewell concerts, La Meta, at the Choliseo.
- August 10–11, 2024 (Carín León): first regional Mexican artist to debut in Puerto Rico as a headliner, having previously performed at the venue for the 2023 Premios Juventud.
- September 4, 2024: twentieth anniversary of the José Miguel Agrelot Coliseum of Puerto Rico.

== 2025–2027 ==
=== Debuts in Puerto Rico ===
- Lauren Daigle: February 18, 2025
- Shawn Mendes: April 8, 2025
- Tyler, the Creator: March 31, 2026

=== Debuts at the venue ===
- Omar Courtz: March 29–30, 2025
- Elvis Crespo: June 21, 2025
- Rawayana: November 28–29, 2026
- Miss Universe: November 24, 2026

=== Debuts as headliner ===
Artists who debuted at the venue as the main act, after having previously performed as part of a group, band or as a guest artist.

- Dei V: October 23–25, 2025
- Young Miko: December 5–6, 2025

=== Events ===
- July 11–September 20, 2025 (Bad Bunny): a 31-date concert residency, titled No Me Quiero Ir de Aquí, became the rapper's first residency, as well as the first one held at the venue and in Puerto Rico. The residency supported his sixth studio album, Debí Tirar Más Fotos (2025), and broke a record held by Wisin & Yandel that was established after a 14-date run of their farewell tour in the month of December 2022. Initially a 21-date residency ending on August 24, it was extended to 30 dates on January 15, on the same day tickets were released. An additional 31st date was announced the day after the initial end date, taking place on September 20, 2025, on the eighth anniversary of the impact of Hurricane María in Puerto Rico.
- October 3, 2025 (NBA): third NBA game held at the venue, seventh overall in Puerto Rico, marking the NBA's return after nearly 20 years since the last two that were held at the Choliseo. The Orlando Magic, playing as the away team, won 126–118 against the Miami Heat in a pre-season match. The Heat returned to Puerto Rico for the third time, after being defeated by the Memphis Grizzlies and Detroit Pistons in exhibition games in 2005 and 2006, respectively.
- January 14, 2026 (Avenged Sevenfold): marks the band's return to Puerto Rico after fifteen years.
- May 13, 2026 (Ed Sheeran): marks his return to Puerto Rico after nine years.
- October 24, 2026 (Fiel a La Vega): marks the band's 30th anniversary.
- November 21–22 & 24, 2026 (Miss Universe 2026): marks the fourth Miss Universe pageant held in Puerto Rico and the first one at the Choliseo, with the national costume gala, the preliminaries and the finals being held over three days.
- August 10, 2027 (Hilary Duff): marks the singer's return to Puerto Rico in almost twenty two years.
