= Éxitos (Tempo album) =

Greatest hits album by Tempo
- Released: January 29, 2002
- Genre: Hip hop; reggaeton
- Label: Buddha's Productions

Tempo chronology
Unplugged (2001)	Éxitos (2002)	Buddha's Family 2: Desde La Prisión (2005)

Éxitos is the greatest hits album from Tempo, released on January 29, 2002.

== Track listing ==
1. "Intro"
2. "Amén" (featuring Getto)
3. "Ven y Vuela"
4. "Intro"
5. "La Misión" (diss to Lito & Polaco)
6. "Intro"
7. "Muchos Quieren" (featuring Getto & Gastam)
8. "Balas" (diss to Master Joe & O.G. Black, Ranking Stone, DJ Joe) (featuring Mexicano 777)
9. "T.E.M.P.O" (diss to Daddy Yankee, Lito & Polaco, Master Joe & O.G. Black)
10. "Narco Hampón" (diss to Daddy Yankee)
11. "Dream Team Killer"
12. "Las Gerlas (Remix)" (featuring Getto)
13. "No Es Tan Fácil"
14. "Voy de Misión"
15. "Tú y Quien Más" (diss to Master Joe & O.G. Black)
16. "Descontrólate"
17. "Ahora Sí Mami"

== Charts ==
Chart (2002)	Peak position
US Top Latin Albums (Billboard)	21
US Latin Pop Albums (Billboard)	10
