= Free Tempo =

Studio album by Tempo
- Released: May 19, 2009
- Recorded: 2006–09
- Studios: Federal Correctional Institution (Miami, United States); Abbey Road Studios (London, United Kingdom)
- Genres: Hip hop; reggaeton
- Length: 70:51
- Label: Sony Latin
- Producers: Diesel; Echo; Nesty; Victor el Nasi; Live Music; Boy Wonder; Laterz; Now

Tempo chronology
Éxitos (2002)	Free Tempo (2009)	Free Music (2013)

Free Tempo is the third studio album by Puerto Rican rapper Tempo. It was released during his incarceration by Sony Music Latin on May 19, 2009. The album received a nomination for Best Long Form Music Video at the 10th Annual Latin Grammy Awards for the video which featured the London Symphony Orchestra.

== Track listing ==
No.	Title	Writer(s)	Producer(s)	Length
1.	"Porque Soy Tempo" (featuring London Symphony Orchestra)	David Sánchez; Eddie Montilla	Echo	6:08
2.	"Deja Que Hable El Dembow" (featuring Wisin & Yandel)	D. Sánchez; Juan Luis Morera; Llandel Veguilla	Victor El Nasi; Nesty	3:52
3.	"Yo No Soy Ejemplo" (featuring Tego Calderón)	D. Sánchez; Tegui Calderón	Echo	4:22
4.	"Los Leones del Sur" (featuring Dálmata, Divino, Getto & Gastam, J-King & Maximan, Ñejo and Guelo Star)	Fernando Mangual; Daniel Velázquez; Raul Antonio Lozada; Vicente Gaztambide; Jaime Borges; Héctor Padilla; Carlos Crespo; Miguel De Jesús	Jamsha	5:52
5.	"25 de Septiembre"	D. Sánchez	Echo	4:20
6.	"Impresióname" (featuring Jowell & Randy)	D. Sánchez; Joel Alexis Muñoz; Randy Ariel Ortiz	DJ Giann; Dexter	4:23
7.	"Talento De Un Barrio Fino" (featuring Daddy Yankee)	D. Sánchez; Ramón Luis Ayala	Echo	4:46
8.	"Cuál Es Tu Nombre"	D. Sánchez	Echo	2:53
9.	"Interlude"	D. Sánchez	Echo	0:46
10.	"Corran Por Sus Vidas" (featuring Héctor el Father, Yomo and Lele el Arma Secreta)	D. Sánchez; Héctor Delgado; José Alberto Torres; Victor Rivera Santiago	Echo	4:42
11.	"El Afterparty" (featuring J-King & Maximan and Guelo Star)	J. Borges; H. Padilla; M. De Jesús	Jamsha	4:42
12.	"Free Tempo" (featuring Barrington Levy and Fat Joe)	Barrington Ainsworth Levy; Joseph Antonio Cartagena	Boy Wonder	3:29
13.	"Mantenlo Gangster"	D. Sánchez	Echo	3:51
14.	"Deja Que Hable El Dembow (Remix)" (featuring Zion)	D. Sánchez; Felix Ortiz	Nely	3:33
15.	"Se Acordarán De Mí" (featuring Arcángel)	D. Sánchez; Austin Santos	Echo	4:20
16.	"Free Tempo (Remix)" (featuring MC Ceja, Getto & Gastam, Barrington Levy and Mexicano 777)	A. Mendoza; R. A. Lozada; V. Gaztambide; B. Ainsworth Levy; Ismael Perales	Boy Wonder	5:51
17.	"Te Habla Tempo"	D. Sánchez	Echo	3:31

Possible bonus tracks
No.	Title	Writer(s)	{{{extra_column}}}	Length
18.	"Hasta Abajo (Remix 2) [featuring Don Omar and Dynasty]"	A&X	D. Sanchez; William Omar Landron R.	3:45
19.	"Hasta Abajo (Remix 2.5) [featuring Don Omar, Daddy Yankee and Dynasty]"	D. Sanchez; William Omar Landron R.; Raymond Ayala	A&X	5:01

== Charts ==
Chart (2009)	Peak position
US Billboard 200	189
US Top Latin Albums (Billboard)	6
US Latin Rhythm Albums (Billboard)	3
