= Fuera De Serie =

Fuera de Serie

Studio album by Lito & Polaco
- Released: March 23, 2004
- Recorded: 2003–2004
- Genre: Hip hop; Latin hip hop; conscious hip hop; reggaeton
- Length: 56:00
- Label: Pina Records, Universal Music Group
- Producer: Mind Dwella; DJ Blass; DJ Dicky; Eliel; Rafi Mercenario; Marcell; Harry Digital; DJ Reggie; DJ Rafy Pabon; Noriega; Luny Tunes

Lito & Polaco chronology
Mundo Frío (2002)	Fuera de Serie (2004)	Fuera de Serie Live (2005)

Fuera de Serie is the 2004 third album by hip hop duo Lito & Polaco.

This was the duo's third musical work. The album was produced by the Pina Records label, and the themes and musical arrangements were made by producers Raphy Pina, DJ Blass, DJ Dicky, DJ Reggie, Harry Digital, Mind Duela, Richard. Marcell, Rafy Mercenario, Eliel and Luny Tunes. The album was distributed by parent company Universal Music Group.

This album featured the collaboration of various artists on different songs. The guest artists were Nicky Jam, a great friend of the duo; Divino; Don Chezina; Jacob; La Secta AllStar; the Mexican singer Pablo Portillo; and Tino & Peaches.

== Track listing ==
1. "Intro"
2. "Tú Me Guayaste" (Polaco featuring Nicky Jam)
3. "Ojos de Diabla" (featuring Divino)
4. "Andamos Prestao" (Polaco)
5. "La Calle Está Difícil"
6. "Sicario de Barrio" (Lito MC Cassidy featuring Don Chezina)
7. "Gata Traicionera" (featuring Jacob)
8. "Ella Vive Sola" (featuring Gustavo Laureano)
9. "Te Quiero Ver Bailar" (featuring Pablo Portillo)
10. "Auxilio" (Lito MC Cassidy)
11. "Eso Eso"
12. "Na Que Buscar Com Mi Lámpara" (Polaco)
13. "Make You Sweat" (featuring Tino & Peaches)
14. "Puercos Como Tú"
15. "Loco" (Nicky Jam preview track)
16. "Te Quedas Callá"

== Charts ==
Chart (2004)	Peak Position
US Latin Albums (Billboard)	28
US Tropical Albums (Billboard)	2
