= Mundo Frío =

Studio album by Lito & Polaco
- Released: Enero, 2002
- Recorded: 2001–2002
- Studio: Pina Technology Inc. (U.S)
- Genres: Hip hop; hardcore hip hop; gangsta rap; reggaeton
- Length: 43:49
- Label: Pina Records
- Producers: Raphy Pina; DJ Dicky; DJ Blass; DJ Magic

Lito & Polaco chronology
Los Éxitos Vol. 1 (2000)	Mundo Frío (2002)	Fuera De Serie (2004)

Mundo Frío is the second studio album by Puerto Rican hip hop duo Lito & Polaco. It was released in 2002 by Pina Records. It had the collaboration of Nicky Jam, Julio Voltio, Speedy, Daddy Yankee, and Wise. To date it is the duo's most successful album.

This production contains songs mostly from hip hop as well as genres such as reggaeton and some 'tiraeras', which are clearly their specialty in the gender. There are songs where the duo continues insulting the members of the musical company Buddha's Family mainly Tempo, MC Ceja and the producer Buddha himself. They would also start a war against Eddie Dee and then with his friend Tego Calderón.

It was nominated for Billboard's Latin Rap Album of the Year but lost to El General Is Back by El General.

Videos were made for "Rosando Con Mi Piel", "Mundo Frío", and "Esta Noche Quiero Darte". It was the first Latin album to be produced by Terry Date and Fat Joe.

== Track listing ==
1. "Intro: Welcome to My World"
2. "Bala Loca"
3. "Rosando Con Mi Piel" (feat Nicky Jam)
4. "Mundo Frío"
5. "No Confío" (feat Voltio)
6. "Interlude: MC Teca" (diss to MC Ceja)
7. "Eddie Kaneca" (diss to Eddie Dee)
8. "Esta Noche Quiero Darte" (feat Speedy)
9. "Sábado Gansta"
10. "Que Prendan los Phillies"
11. "El Gran Robo" (feat Daddy Yankee)
12. "Interlude: Acabado de Recibir" (diss to Tempo and Buddha)
13. "Última Vuelta" (diss to Tempo)
14. "Interlude: Calsoncillos Cag!@#..." (diss to Tempo and Buddha)
15. "Sábado Chilling"
16. "Quiero Sexo" (feat. Wise)
17. "Mírate Al Espejo" (Bonus)

== Charts ==
Chart (2002)	Peak Position	Weeks Duration
US Latin Albums (Billboard)	19	8
US Latin Pop Albums (Billboard)	10	5
