= La Secta =

La Secta may refer to:

- La Secta AllStar, a band from Puerto Rico
- La Secta (professional wrestling), a AAA stable
