= Consejo (album) =

Studio album by La Secta AllStar
- Released: May 3, 2005
- Recorded: 2004–2005
- Genre: Rock en español
- Length: 42:11
- Label: Universal Latino

La Secta AllStar chronology
| Túnel (2003) | Consejo (2005) | El Hit Parade (2006) |

Consejo is the fourth studio album by the Puerto Rican rock band La Secta AllStar, released on May 3, 2005, by Universal Latino. Three singles were released: "Consejo", "Este Corazón" and "La Locura Automática".

The album has collaborations with artists like Wilkins and reggaeton artists Wisin & Yandel. A remix of "La Locura Automática" is on 12 Discípulos, a reggaeton album produced by Eddie Dee, and on the deluxe edition of Consejo, along with another remix and a bonus DVD.

In December 2005, the album was chosen as one of the 20 Most Significant Albums of 2005 by the National Foundation of Popular Culture.

== Track listing ==
1. "Consejo" - 4:06
2. "Este Corazón" - 4:46
3. "La Locura Automática" - 4:50
4. "Llora Mi Corazón" - 3:09
5. "El Perdedor" - 4:34
6. "No Te Lloraré" - 3:13
7. "Todo Por Ti" - 5:02
8. "Comedia De Amor" - 3:59
9. "Wanna Wanna" - 4:06
10. "La Vida Nos Acerca" - 4:24

== Awards ==
Consejo was nominated for Grammy and Lo Nuestro awards, and won a Billboard award. In its first month, the album sold 80,000 copies.

== Sales and certifications ==
| Region | Certification | Certified units/sales |
|---|---|---|
| United States (RIAA) | Platinum (Latin) | 100,000^{^} |
^{^} Shipments figures based on certification alone.
