= Boricua's State of Mind =

Studio album by MC Ceja
- Released: October 30, 2001
- Recorded: 2000–2001
- Genre: Reggaeton, hip hop
- Label: MadYatch Records

MC Ceja chronology
Todo Ha Cambiado (1998)	Boricua's State of Mind (2001)	Luz Solar 2 (2008)

Boricua's State of Mind is an album by Puerto Rican rapper MC Ceja.

== Track listing ==
1. "Intro"
2. "Desnudate" (featuring Wisin & Yandel)
3. "Se Lamentarán" (featuring Baby Rasta)
4. "Bounce with This"
5. "Te Ves Bien"
6. "Killa' Track" (featuring Artilleria Secreta)
7. "Danger, Danger"
8. "No Podran"
9. "Bellas"
10. "Mega Mix"
11. "Impossible Amor"
12. "Boricua's State of Mind" (featuring Ivy Queen, Gran Omar, Bimbo)
13. "Mientes"
14. "Outro"
