= Sentenciados =

Album by Baby Rasta & Gringo

Studio album by Baby Rasta & Gringo
- Released: May 11, 2004
- Genre: Reggaeton
- Label: Universal Music Latino
- Producer: Cheka, Noriega, Tazmania, DJ Sonic

Baby Rasta & Gringo chronology
Fire Live (2004)	Sentenciados (2004)	The Comeback (2008)

Sentenciados (Sentenced in English) is Baby Rasta & Gringo's first album. The regular edition of the CD contains 22 tracks while the platinum edition contains 24.

== Track listing ==
1. Yo Soy Así (Baby Rasta track)
2. Interlude
3. Presidente de La Música
4. Tú y Quién Más
5. Interlude
6. Yo Quiero Contigo
7. El Carnaval
8. Avísame
9. Te Quiero Desnuda
10. Dime Si Eres Mía
11. Peleando Con Mi Música (Baby Rasta track)
12. La Vida Es Cruel
13. Antes de Ser Cantante (Baby Rasta track)
14. Ven Llale (Gringo track)
15. Niña
16. Canchan (Baby Rasta track)
17. Sentenciado Por Ti (feat. Cheka)
18. Provócame (Chencho & Machito track)
19. Sola (Tony Tone y Kendo track)
20. Esto Es Real (feat. Gastam)
21. Sentenciado Por Ti [Remix] (feat. Cheka)
22. Sin Rivales (Cheka track)

Sentenciados Platinum Edition

Studio album by Baby Rasta & Gringo
- Released: January 25, 2005
- Genre: Reggaeton
- Label: Big/N.U Records
- Producer: Cheka, Noriega, Tazmania, DJ Sonic

Baby Rasta & Gringo chronology
Romances Del Ruido 2 (2003)	Sentenciados Platinum Edition (2005)	The Comeback (2008)

== Platinum Edition Track listing ==
Disk 1:

1. Avisame (Bachata Version)
2. Dime Si Eres Mía (Inglés Version)
3. Yo Soy Así
4. Interlude
5. Presidente de La Música
6. Tú y Quién Más
7. Interlude
8. Yo Quiero Contigo
9. El Carnaval
10. Avísame
11. Te Quiero Desnuda
12. Dime Si Eres Mía
13. Peleando Con Mi Música
14. La Vida Es Cruel
15. Antes de Ser Cantante
16. Ven Llale
17. Niña
18. Canchan
19. Sentenciado Por Ti (feat. Cheka)
20. Provócame (Chencha y Machito track)
21. Sola (Tony Tone y Kendo track)
22. Esto Es Real (feat. Gastam)
23. Sentenciado Por Ti (Remix) (feat. Cheka)
24. Sin Rivales (Cheka track)

Disk 2: DVD

== Charts ==
Chart (2004)	Peak Position
US Top Latin Albums (Billboard)	10
US Latin Tropical Albums (Billboard)	1
US Top Heatseekers (Billboard)	26

== See also ==
- List of number-one Billboard Tropical Albums from the 2000s
