= Los tres mosqueteros =

Los tres mosqueteros may refer to:

- The Three Musketeers (1942 film), a Mexican comedy film
- The Three Musketeers (1946 film), an Argentine-Uruguayan historical adventure film
- Los Tres Mosqueteros, a reggaeton trio

== See also ==
- The Three Musketeers (disambiguation)
