= Ignacio Peña =

Puerto Rican singer

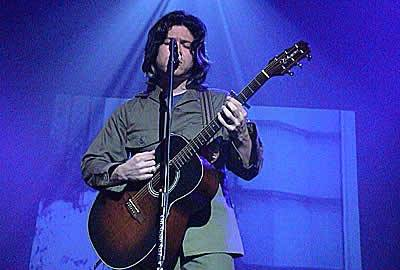
- Peña in 2003

Background information
- Born: Ignacio Peña Vidal; 21 April 1973 (age 52); Río Piedras, Puerto Rico
- Genres: Rock, hard rock, pop rock
- Occupations: Singer/songwriter, musician, record producer, video editor, music video director
- Instruments: Vocals, guitar, piano
- Years active: 2000–present
- Labels: Universal Music Latino, Everywhere Music, HearSay Ltd.
- Website: ignaciopena.net

Ignacio Peña Vidal (born 21 April 1973) is a Puerto Rican rock singer/songwriter, musician, producer, video director and editor, and multimedia creator.

After graduating from Berklee College of Music in Boston, Peña rose to fame in the Latin market with the release of his debut album "El Mundo al Revés" in 2000 and the subsequent tour which saw him perform festivals in Argentina, Venezuela, Panama and the United States. His albums have garnered critical acclaim and are considered by many to be some of the best rock music to come out in Spanish. In 2010, Peña debuted his most ambitious project to date. An educational multimedia concert designed for schools entitled "The Great Planet Earth Debate". Peña has been invited to speak at educational conferences and universities in the United States and his native Puerto Rico and was awarded an honorary degree from the Sistema Universitario Ana G. Méndez in Puerto Rico for his contribution to education. From 2015 through 2017, he has been nominated for five NATAS Suncoast Chapter Emmy Awards, winning two for the WIPR-TV Short Subject documentaries "Por Qué Conmemoramos" (Why We Commemorate) and "Soy De Una Raza Pura" (I Am From A Pure Race) respectively.

== Early life ==
Ignacio Peña was born in Río Piedras, Puerto Rico, to Ignacio Peña Feliciano and Miriam Vidal Otani. His father was a salesman and his mother a secretary. His mother is of Japanese descent. His grandfather was a soldier in the US Army during the Second World War stationed in Okinawa. There he met Eiko Otani whom he would marry and bring stateside to begin a family. Ignacio and his two younger sisters grew up in different parts of San Juan, PR. He attended and graduated from Wesleyan Academy in Guaynabo, PR. After his parents' divorce at the age of 14 Peña got his first guitar and spent the rest of his youth between school and weekends with his bandmates, writing songs and rehearsing where he began to hone his craft as a songwriter. After completing his bachelor's degree in music production and engineering at Boston's Berklee College of Music, he began writing, singing and producing jingles until the opportunity to make his first record arrived. During this time, he kept writing and recording new songs while pitching them to labels and other music business outlets. After many attempts to land a recording deal, Ignacio met his would-be manager in Criteria Studios in Miami Florida. Now with management, Ignacio went into the studio with producer Pablo Manavello to record a three-song demo. The demo for "75% de Agua" was picked up by local rock radio station Alfa Rock 105.7 FM and the song generated an unprecedented number of requests. This resulted in a recording contract with Universal Music Latino and the subsequent production of his first album.

== El Mundo al Revés ==
(The World Upside Down)

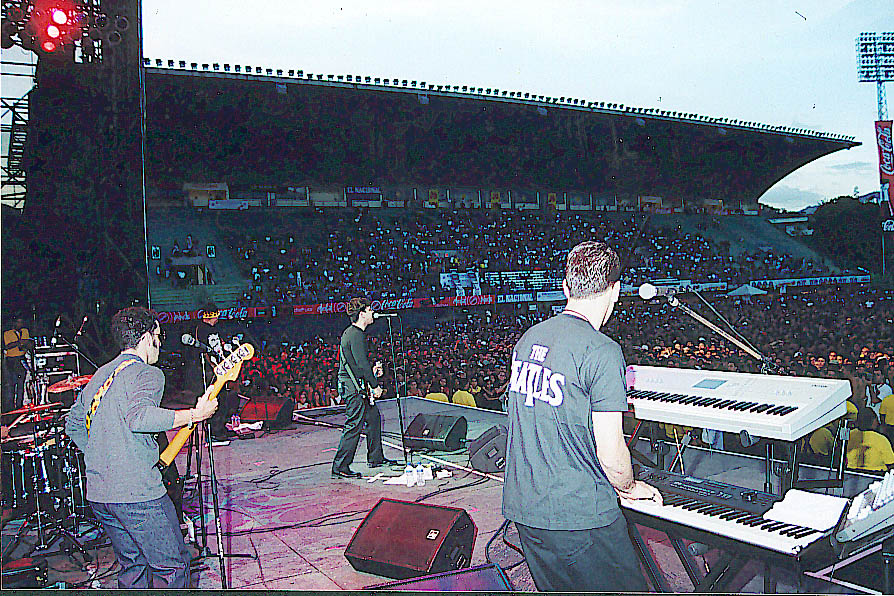
Peña opening for Oasis, during the Caracas Pop Fest 2001 @ Estadio De La Universidad Nacional, Caracas, Venezuela.

Produced by Pablo Manavello, El Mundo Al Revés was recorded in Miami and Nashville and released by Universal Music Latino on 10 October 2000. The production was also overseen by music engineer, Iker Gastaminza (Ricardo Montaner, Témpano) and mixing engineer, Bob St. John (Collective Soul, Extreme, Duran Duran). El Mundo al Revés has 11 songs with lyrics based on personal experiences and reflections. The songs are mostly related to common people getting into different habits, starting with "En Español", a funny story about the use of that reference to promote products oriented to the Latin market in the U.S. A romantic "75% de Agua," is followed by 1960s-style ballad, "Un Retrato de la Luna" and "Puertos," written by Peña while waiting for a departure flight from the Miami International Airport. Inspired by fortune tellers promoting their "gift" on TV, "El Fongo Estelar" anticipates "El Mundo Al Revés" main title track. After love related "Melissa" and "Por Si Acaso", the album comes to an end with the intimate and relaxed "Duérmete".

The album received favorable reviews.

"Singer/songwriter Ignacio Peña's first outing, on Universal, is a lovely collection of pop tracks that evoke everything from Eric Clapton to Oasis. Thanks to thoughtful, well-written lyrics that never fall into triteness, this manages to be an album without a single throwaway track." Billboard Magazine

"Mr. Peña crafts sly pop-rock tunes brimming with meaty hooks, guitar riffs and clever lyrics. " The Dallas Morning News

"A debut record that sets precedents "En Español" – track that opens the CD – and evokes the days past of Argentinian rock and English pop." People En Español

"Considering that most Latin pop and rock albums nowadays suffer from overwhelming cheesiness, "El Mundo Al Revés" is a promise of better things to come". The Miami Herald

A year later, Peña started opening for International acts like Neil Young and Oasis in Buenos Aires and the Caracas Pop Festival in Venezuela as well as Laura Pausini; and Chile's alternative rock group, La Ley in Panama. Ignacio then toured the United States as the opening act for Ricardo Arjona where he performed in San Jose and Los Angeles, California and Miami, Florida. Peña received the award Premios Paoli in Puerto Rico for Best National Rock Artist in 2001. The album also garnered the 2001 American Graphic Design Award, for Best Album Cover.

== Phono/Gráphico ==
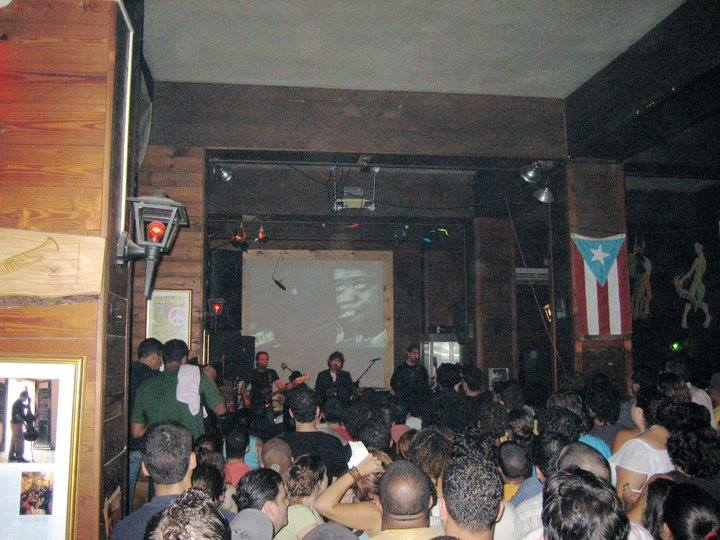
Phono/Gráphico show presented @ Nuyorican Café in Old San Juan, PR, c. 2006

In 2001, Peña started to dabble in video editing and began directing and editing his own videos beginning with the 4th single for "El Mundo al Revés" entitled "Por Si Acaso". As he began to write songs for his second album he began editing visuals against the new songs using a collage of pop culture images and movies. The result was his first conceptual audiovisual show Phono/Gráphico. Phono/Gráphico is essentially the philosophic concept of a songwriter/musician, approaching the video presentation of his songs with the same seriousness and commitment as he has with the music. For Phono/Gráphico, Peña compiled and edited all the visuals which came together to offer viewers a glimpse of a post 9/11 world through the eyes and ears of the artist. Phono/Gráphico was mainly created using Mac's iMovie program.

== Anormal ==
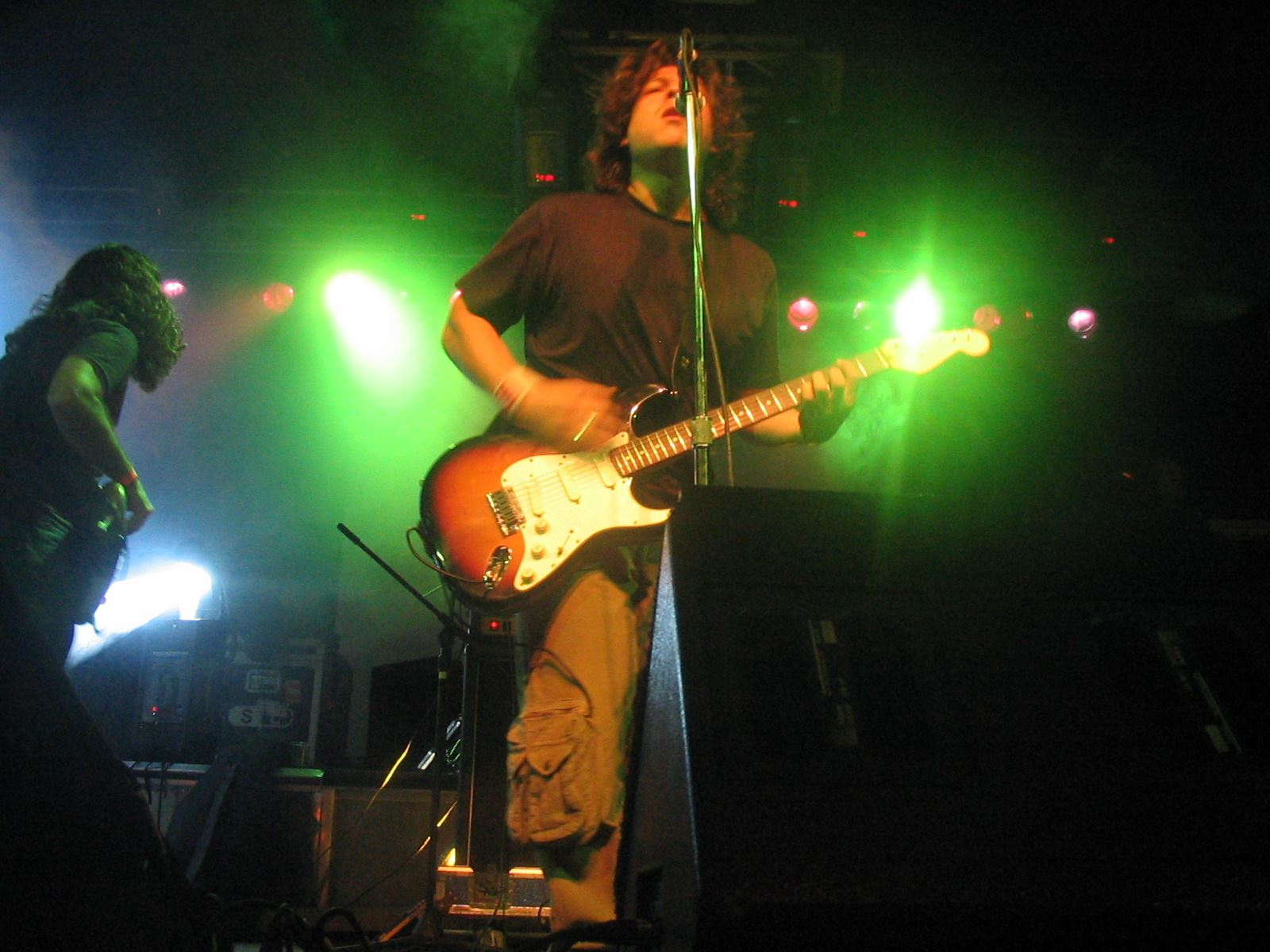
Peña performing in 2004

Four years after the release of his debut album, Peña released his sophomore album "Anormal" (Hearsay Ltd.) This second album, which was released in Puerto Rico on 31 March 2004, marked a drastic change in Ignacio's rock performance style, after the launch of 2000's "El Mundo Al Revés", a singer/songwriter effort, which was more pop oriented and completely in Spanish. The record demonstrated Ignacio's evolution as an artist and songwriter plus the musical cohesiveness between his fellow band members that only comes from touring and playing together. Conceived during the aftermath of the World Trade Center terrorist attacks on 11 September 2001, "Anormal" (Abnormal) is a conceptual proposal that entwines 12 songs that narrate a process of existential conflicts. "Hey tú (imbécil)" (Hey you (imbecile)), was the album's first single. The video for it was directed by Ignacio himself, and was done in the "Phono/Gráphico" style, in which a collage of footage from an array of news and pop culture sources and personally edited by the artist, is constantly running synchronized with the music that's being played live. Images of explosions, aliens, military marches and political figures are part of the video that also includes a scene re-enactment of the sci-fi classic film "A Clockwork Orange", directed by Stanley Kubrick who Peña claims as a musical influence. Produced by Ignacio Peña, Iker Gastaminza and guitarist Tony Rijos, "Anormal" also includes a guest appearance by Gustavo Laureano, lead singer of La Secta AllStar, in "Velocidad de escape" and its English version, "Any year, any room, any highway". Anormal was recorded in Puerto Rico and mixed in Miami. The recording process began in an empty office the band rented in Santurce where the band set up a makeshift studio and began recording. The basic tracks were recorded at Digitech Studios in San Juan and the album was then mixed by Iker Gastaminza in Miami.

Like his debut album, Anormal also garnered rave reviews from the critics:

"El cantautor boricua Ignacio Peña nos presenta su segundo material discográfico titulado Anormal, y verdaderamente es fuera de lo normal, es decir, es de las pocas cosas hechas en español que podemos llamarle sin temor a equivocarnos, como auténtico rock. Actualizado a nuestro cronómetro real. Algo distinto dentro del infestado mercado del pop y el rock insustancial." El Sol de Texas

"Muchas veces escapistas y otras veces contestatario, "Anormal nos muestra a un artista en medio de un interesante proceso evolutivo. Una de las mejores piezas emanadas del nuevo rock latino alternativo." Drago Bonacich, Allmusic.com

"Anormal es un disco que no suelta ni vacila. Lleva el tipo de energia adictiva que siempre hemos apreciado como el pulso que define el rock y del que muchas bandas de rock en español han carecido lamentablemente. " Buena Vida

== Bletzung ==
In 2005 Peña's song "Only End Up Lonely" won the iTunes Jukebox Jury contest at the South By Southwest Music Conference in Austin Texas. Peña relocated to Austin and created the band Bletzung. The band's self-titled debut album was released independently (Hearsay Ltd.) in late 2006. The album was a version of Peña's second album "Anormal" completely in English. The band released a video for the first single called "Only End Up Lonely". Under the auspice of Bletzung, Peña toured the southern states while beginning to work on material for their second album. Bletzung disbanded in 2008.

== Songs for the Fall of an Empire ==
In May 2009, Peña became the first Latin artist to release an application for the iPhone, and on 7 August 2009 released a video and Digital 45 with demos of two new songs, Defeat and Something Was Bound To Happen, which he announced would be part of his next conceptual piece entitled "Songs for the Fall of an Empire". The video included footage from the Iraq war and the subsequent economic crash of 2008. The project was put on indefinite hiatus and Peña decided to concentrate on the educational concert experience "El Gran Debate del Planeta Tierra".

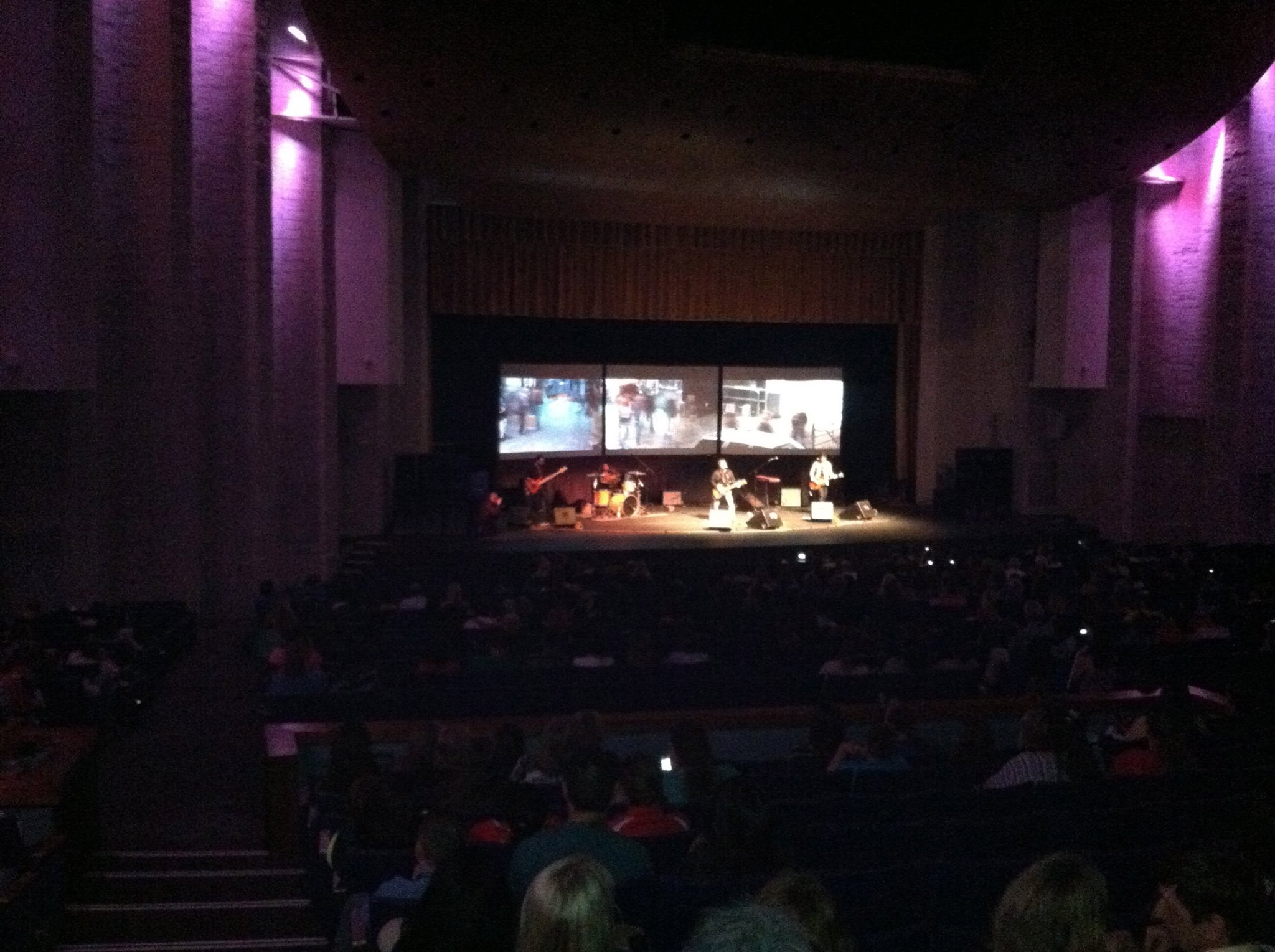
Peña performing The Great Planet Earth Debate: Energy during the 2012 Science Teachers Association Convention, in Corpus Christi, Texas.

== El Gran Debate Del Planeta Tierra ==
(The Great Planet Earth Debate)

In 2006, Peña was invited to perform at Owen Goodnight Middle School in San Marcos, Texas to close a lecture on climate change. It was there that he was inspired to use his audiovisual conceptual abilities to create an educational concert that would entice and interest students in history, science, math and technology. 4 years later, in 2010, Peña unveiled "El Gran Debate del Planeta Tierra: Energía" (The Great Planet Earth Debate: Energy), a multimedia educational concert which uses a music video aesthetic and speed to help students make emotional connections with the subject matters they are taught in school. The album that accompanied the show included 5 new recordings. 2 new songs: "Memoria Phonográfica" and "Remind Me when we Get There". A new version of "Mientras Espero el fin del Mundo" which originally appeared on his debut album and a new version of "Falta 1 Persona" from his second album. The record also included Peña's first ever instrumental "Solar". Subsequently, Peña has been invited as a speaker and performer to various universities, foundations and educational conferences, to speak about the use of multimedia in education. Also, to talk about the principles of storytelling, as to how they apply to music and art conceptualization in general.

== Por Qué Conmemoramos ==
(Why We Commemorate) right|

In 2014 Peña was commissioned by the Puerto Rico Corporation for Public Broadcasting (WIPR-TV, Channel 6) to create a series of nine documentary shorts called "Por Qué Conmemoramos". These three minute videos tell the stories behind Puerto Rican holidays. All nine shorts were created in Spanish, and four of them were translated into English. The introduction and closing for these features the song "Tírale" (Take a shot) from Puerto Rican metal band "Puya" and Peña's own "Remind Me When We Get There" was used as incidental music. For this series, Peña was nominated for two 2015 NATAS Suncoast Chapter Emmy awards, Best Editor and Best Informational/Instructional Short for which he won.

Featured Holidays were:

- Día De La Constitución De Puerto Rico (Puerto Rico's Constitution Day)
- Día De La Abolición De La Esclavitud (Slave Emancipation Day)
- Día Del Trabajo (Labor Day)
- Día De La Bandera (Flag Day)
- Día De La Recordación (Memorial Day)
- Día De Los Presidentes Y Próceres Puertoriqueños (Presidents and National Heroes Day)
- Día De El Grito De Lares (Lares' Uprising Day)
- Día De La Independencia de Estados Unidos (USA Independence Day)
- Día De San Juan (San Juan Day)

In 2016 he was nominated for a third Emmy as editor for the "Día De El Grito De Lares" episode in this series.

== Soy De Una Raza Pura ==
(I Am from a Pure Race)

After the success of the "Por Qué Conmemoramos" series, WIPR-TV commissioned Peña to create a new series of shorts, that aimed to tell the stories of important, and some lesser known, black figures in Puerto Rican history, debuting in March 2016. "Soy De Una Raza Pura", takes its name from a popular song by Lucecita Benítez, written by Tony Croatto and David Ortíz Angleró, and it is featured both on the introduction and ending of these episodes. "Tírale" by Puerto Rican rock band Buscabulla is featured as incidental music. In 2017, Peña was nominated for his fourth and fifth NATAS Suncoast Chapter Emmy awards for the Arturo Schomburg episode of this series, Best Editor and Best Informational/Instructional, winning his second award, again on the latter category.

Featured biographies:

- Arturo Alfonso Schomburg
- Pura Belpré
- Juano Hernández
- Rafael Hernández Marín
- Eleuterio Derkes
- Celestina Cordero
- Juan Boria
- José Celso Barbosa
- Julia de Burgos
- Ruth Fernández
- Enrique Laguerre
- Luis Felipe Dessus

== Discography ==
Albums:

- El Mundo al Revés (2000)
- Anormal (2004)
- Bletzung (2006)
- El Gran Debate del Planeta Tierra (2010)
- El Mundo al Revés: El Box Set (2015)
- Songs for the Fall of an Empire (2018)

Singles:

- 75% de Agua
- Un Retrato de la Luna
- En Español
- Por Si Acaso
- Duérmete
- Hey Tú (Imbécil)
- Dónde Estabas?
- Only End Up Lonely
- Mientras Espero el Fin del Mundo 2010
- Memoria Phonográfica
- The Same Replies
- Sound the Alarm
- Fall Apart
- She's Bleeding
- An Elephant In the Room
- Can It Wait?
- Defeat
