= Buddha's Family 2: Desde La Prisión =

Compilation album by Various artists
- Released: December 20, 2005
- Genre: Reggaeton; hip hop
- Label: Buddha's Productions

Buddha's Family 2: Desde La Prisión is the compilation album by various artists, released on December 20, 2005.

== Track listing ==
CD 1 – Reggaeton

1. Tempo and Don Omar – "Intro"
2. Zion & Lennox – "Me Dirijo a Ella"
3. Getto – "Hoy Yo Voy Por Ti"
4. Gastam – "Castigo"
5. Kenny & Eric – "Pérdida Total"
6. MC Ceja – "Pelotera"
7. Divino – "Me Trancaron"
8. Don Omar and Tempo – "Yo Vivo En Guerra"
9. Gastam & Chris – "Volviéndote Loca"
10. R.K.M & Ken-Y – "Hoy Te Vi"
11. Trebol Clan – "El Cantazo"
12. Reta & Jan-K – "A Galope"
13. Wibal & Alex – "Brusca"
14. Edwal – "A Lo Gangster"
15. Getto & Moreno – "Ven Mami"
16. J-King & Maximan – "Party de Gangster"
17. Virtual & Shorty – "Muñeca"
18. JQ – "Dinamita"
19. Molusko – "Otro/Sóplamela"

CD 2 – Hip hop

1. Ivy Queen, Gallego, MC Ceja, Getto & Gastam, Cosculluela – "Intro" (dedicado a Tempo)
2. Getto & Gastam – "No Problemas"
3. MC Ceja – "Conflicto"
4. Ivy Queen – "Ando Con Mi Corillo"
5. Don Omar and Tempo – "Vivo En Guerra"
6. MC Ceja and Gastam – "Rap vs. Federales"
7. Héctor el Father and Naldo – "Si Quieren Guerra"
8. Cosculluela and Getto – "Te Va a Ir Mal"
9. Baby Rasta – "Como Yo Ninguno"
10. Zeta – "No Me Sorprende"
11. Getto & Gastam – "Hoy Voy Por Ti"
12. Kenny – "We Don't Stop"
13. Tommy Viera – "Los Cangri y Buddha's Family"
14. Varon – "Dando de Que Hablar"
15. Cuban Link and MC Ceja – "No Respect"
16. Arcángel & De La Ghetto – "Policias Envidiosos"
17. Ro-K – "Malcriao"
18. Tempo and Getto) – "Narco Hampón (Remix)"

== Chart performance ==
Chart (2006)	Peak position
US Latin Albums (Billboard)	12
US Latin Rhythm Albums (Billboard)	6
