= Gustavo Laureano =

Puerto Rican musician

- Born: Bayamón, Puerto Rico
- Genres: Rock en Español; Pop music
- Occupations: Guitarist; singer; composer
- Instruments: Guitar; vocals
- Member of: La Secta AllStar

Gustavo Laureano is a Puerto Rican guitarist and composer. He is best known for being the lead singer of the band La Secta AllStar.

== Career ==
=== As a songwriter and solo artist ===
Laureano began his career as a songwriter, together with friend Mark Kilpatrick. In the 1990s, Laureano and Kilpatrick started writing and playing at clubs in Florida and Puerto Rico. At some point, they were discovered by Puerto Rican singer Ricky Martin, who recorded the song "Bombón de Azúcar", written by Laureano, on his 1995 album A Medio Vivir. The following year, Puerto Rican singer Ednita Nazario recorded the song "Ultima Vez", also written by Laureano, on her 1996 album Espíritu Libre.

After achieving success, Laureano has continued to contribute his songwriting to several artists like Obie Bermúdez and Wilkins, among others. Laureano has also collaborated with artists like Ignacio Peña, Wisin & Yandel, Robi Draco Rosa, Reyli, Eddie Dee, Lito & Polaco, KC Porter and Fonseca. In 2007, Laureano released his first solo album titled Kingcallero del Amor.

=== La Secta AllStar ===
See main article: La Secta AllStar

Laureano founded La Secta in the early 90s with Mark Kilpatrick. After playing around Orlando and Puerto Rico, they recorded their first album, Aniquila, in 1998. Since then, the band has released four additional studio albums and has won several awards like Billboard Awards, Lo Nuestro Awards, as well as nominations to the Grammy.

== Solo discography ==
=== Kingcallero del Amor ===
Kingcallero del Amor

Studio album by Gustavo Laureano
- Released: 27 March 2007
- Genre: Rock en Español
- Label: Universal Latino

Professional ratings
Review scores
Source	Rating
Allmusic	(not rated, no review) link

Kingcallero del Amor is the first solo album from singer-songwriter Gustavo Laureano. It was released on 27 March 2007 by Universal Latino. Most of the music in the album was recorded by Laureano himself.

The first single from the album was "Enamorado", which was produced by Marteen and Laureano. According to Universal Music Latino, the song features an 80s rock sound reminiscent of Cheap Trick or XTC.

=== Track listing ===
All tracks written by Laureano and Marteen, except where noted.

1. "Intro" (Afont, Laureano) – 0:29
2. "La Novela" (Afont, Laureano) – 5:54
3. "Si Me Hablaras" (Laureano, Restrepo) – 5:31
4. "Enamorado" – 4:18
5. "Es Así" (Gocho, Laureano, Marteen, Santana) – 3:46
6. "Intro" (Figueroa, Illisastigui, Laureano) – 0:15
7. "Kingcallero" (Figueroa, Illisastigui, Laureano) – 4:06
8. "Nadie Te Va a Salvar" – 2:59
9. "Suavecito" (Avila, Laureano, Marteen) – 4:36
10. "Puede Más" – 5:15
11. "Intro" (Laureano) – 0:19
12. "Amantes del Amor" (Laureano) – 5:17
13. "Porque a Veces Sí" – 4:18
14. "Intro" – 0:11
15. "Star Shine" – 4:40
16. "Suavecito" (Avila, Laureano, Marteen) – 4:40

== See also ==
- La Secta AllStar
- Puerto Rican songwriters
