= Bruni Vélez =

Puerto Rican news anchor (1951–2006)

- Born: March 24, 1951; Mayagüez, Puerto Rico
- Died: August 19, 2006 (aged 55); Río Piedras, Puerto Rico
- Occupation: television journalist

Bruni Vélez Ramirez (March 27, 1951 – August 19, 2006) was a Puerto Rican television reporter. She was an anchorwoman on Puerto Rico's Channel 2's television show, "Telenoticias en Accion". She shared anchoring responsibilities at that show with Anibal Gonzalez Irizarry.

== Career in television ==
She worked as a television journalist for more than 20 years. One of the first women to serve as an anchor for a national news program. She also stood out as a radio broadcaster after acquiring the Station WXLX in Lajas, Puerto Rico.

== Personal ==
Velez was the sister of international singing star Wilkins, who became the MDA's ALS spokesman in Puerto Rico after she died of the disease in 2006.

She had a romantic relationship with musician and singer Chuky Acosta, member of Conjunto Quisqueya. Out of that relationship, she had her only son, Cèsar Acosta.

== Death ==
After battling for more than a year against Lou Gehrig's disease, Bruni Vélez died on a Saturday August 19, 2006, at the age of 55, accompanied by her family at her residence in Río Piedras, Puerto Rico.

== See also ==
- List of Puerto Ricans
