= Ganda (music producer) =

Puerto Rican music producer

Jonathan De Jesus Gandarilla
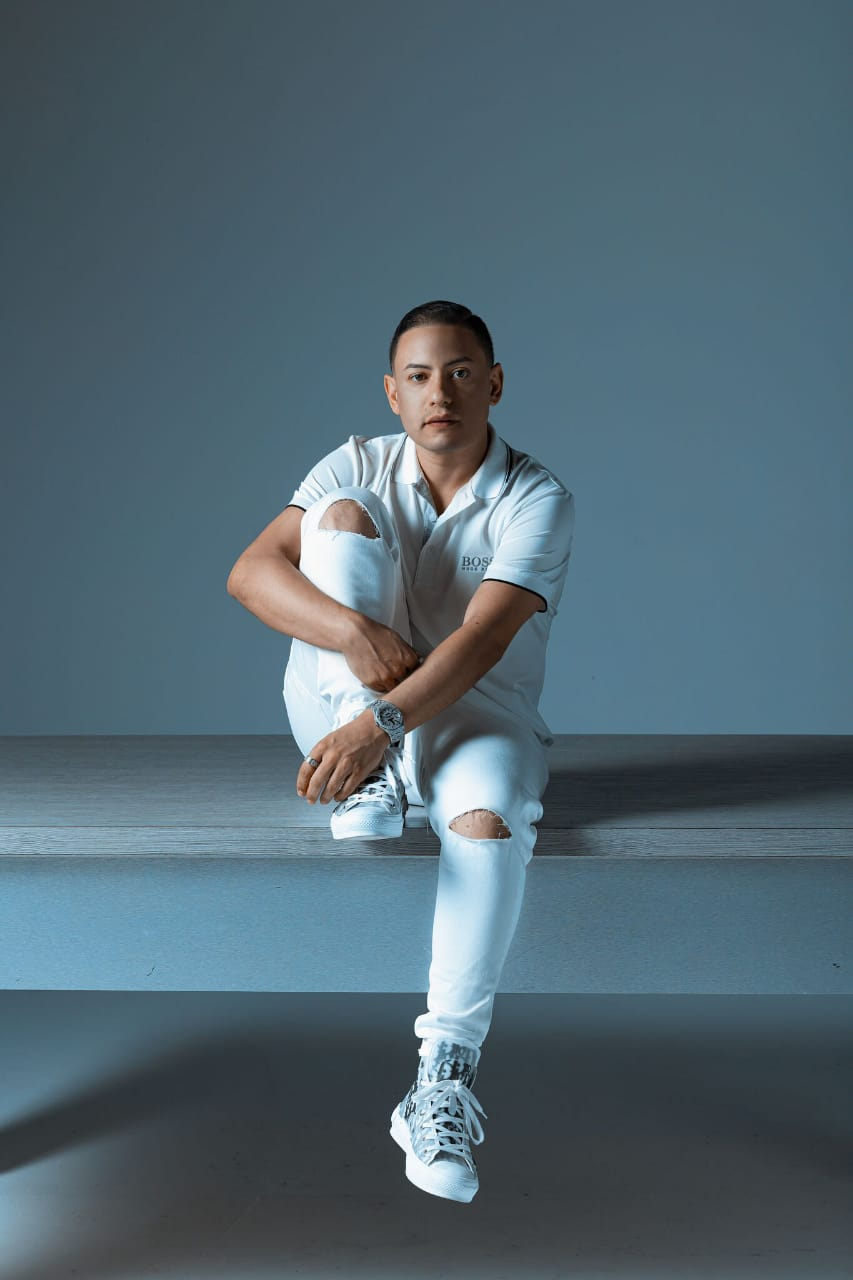

Background information
- Origin: San Juan, Puerto Rico
- Genres: Hip hop, Electronic Dance Music, Reggaeton, Trap Music
- Occupation(s): Music manager, Music Producer
- Labels: Ganda Entertainment, The Golden Army, Sony Music Latin
- Website: Official Website

Jonathan De Jesus Gandarilla known professionally as Ganda is a Puerto Rican music producer and music manager. He is the president of Ganda Entertainment and the indie label The Golden Army.

== Career ==
Jonathan De Jesus Gandarilla is the president of the company Ganda Entertainment, a music company based in Puerto Rico. From 2009 till 2016, he was the manager of the Puerto Rican reggaeton duo Baby Rasta & Gringo. He produced their fourth album Los Cotizados which was released under the label Ganda Entertainment and stayed at the number 1 position at the Latin Rhythm Airplay Charts.

Gandarilla was the executive and creative producer behind the albums Trap Capos: Season 1 featuring artists such as Anuel AA, Bryant Myers, Brytiago and many others and Trap Capos: Season 2 featuring artists such as Baby Rasta & Gringo, Noriel, Bad Bunny, Yandel, Prince Royce, Lito Kirino and many others with Trap Capos Season 1 being nominated for Top Latin Combination Album of the Year at the 2018 Billboard Latin Music Awards. Trap Capos: Season 1 also debuted at number one on the Latin Rhythm Albums chart. Both Trap Capos: Season 1 and Trap Capos: Season 2 have a Gold RIAA certification. The third compilation album Trap Capos: Season 3 will be released soon and will be a joint venture between Ganda Entertainment and Sony Music Latin.

Gandarilla and music producer Santana run an independent record label as well, The Golden Army which focuses on new artists. Gandarilla also has a YouTube channel by the name of Ganda Vlogs where he talks about reggaeton and Puerto Rican music in general.

== Personal life ==
Gandarilla is from Puerto Rico and currently lives in San Juan.

== Awards and nominations ==
Year	Awards	Category	Result
2018	Top Latin Compilation Album of the year for Trap Capos Season 1	Billboard Latin Music Awards	Nominated

== Discography ==
=== Albums ===
- Los Cotizados - Producer
- Trap Capos Season 1 (2016) - Producer
- Trap Capos Season 2 (2018) - Producer
- Trap Capos Season 3 (TBA) - Producer

== See also ==
- reggaeton
- Sony Music Latin
- Puerto Rican music
- Pretty Boy, Dirty Boy
- Maluma
