= Los Tres Mosqueteros =

Puerto Rican reggaeton trio

- Origin: Puerto Rico
- Genres: Reggaeton, hip hop, rap
- Years active: 1997–1999 and 2007-present
- Labels: Before : MadYatch Records/Fonovisa Records; Now : Rompecuello, Taltaro and Get Low Records
- Past members: Alberto Mendoza Nieves; Rafael Sierra; Rafael Omar Molina

Los Tres Mosqueteros were a reggaeton trio consisting of MC Ceja and Lito & Polaco. Only one album was produced from this trio titled Los Tres Mosqueteros, in which each member appeared on the front cover of the album with a picture representing, a picture one would take before being incarcerated.

This group is no longer together due to a fallout, causing them to go their separate ways and starting a lyrical war between MC Ceja and Lito & Polaco y Polaco. After MC Ceja & Lito & Polaco broke up, DJ Eric made a new group who were also called Los 3 Mosqueteros. They came out with an album called De Vuelta Por Primera Vez. The group disappeared soon after.

== Members ==
- Alberto Mendoza Nieves, otherwise known as MC Ceja, was born on February 15, 1978, in Arecibo, Puerto Rico. Other aliases include El Cejón, or El C-jón.
- Lito & Polaco named as Rafael Sierra & Rafael Omar Molina ((see Down))
- Rafael Sierra, also known as Lito from Carolina, Puerto Rico.
- Rafael Omar Molina, also known as Polaco from Carolina, Puerto Rico

== Discography ==
- Los Tres Mosqueteros (1997)
