= Vida Eterna =

Studio album by Getto & Gastam
- Released: November 19, 2002
- Genre: Hip hop; reggaeton
- Label: Buddha's Productions
- Producer: DJ Black; Echo

Vida Eterna is the first reggaeton album by Getto & Gastam and was released on November 19, 2002. The album contains 15 tracks and features the artists Tempo, Nicky Jam, Don Omar, Héctor el Father and Ivy Queen.

== Track listing ==
Standard edition

1. "Intro"
2. "Tratan" (featuring Tempo)
3. "Pégate"
4. "Conspira" (featuring Tempo)
5. "Bailando" (featuring Nicky Jam)
6. "Dame Tu Figura" (featuring Ton-E)
7. "Ombe' No Oficial"
8. "No Se Tiren O Se Mueren" (featuring Don Omar and Héctor el Father) featuring Gastam)
9. "Interlude (Remix)"
10. "Vengan Mujeres Al Baile"
11. "Let's Ride" (featuring Ivy Queen)
12. "Soy Una Persona"
13. "My Flow"
14. "Muchos Quieren" (featuring Tempo)
15. "Seguimos Aquí" (Tempo featuring Getto)
