= La Última Misión World Tour =

2022 concert tour by Wisin & Yandel

La Última Misión Tour
- Tour by Wisin & Yandel
- Associated album: La Última Misión
- Start date: May 27, 2022
- End date: November 25, 2023
- Legs: 4
- No. of shows: 92

Wisin & Yandel concert chronology
- Como Antes Tour 2018-19; La Última Misión Tour 2022-23

La Última Mision World Tour was the farewell concert tour by reggaeton duo Wisin & Yandel supporting their final studio album La Última Misión (2022). The tour commenced on May 27, 2022, in Medellin, Colombia and ended on December 31, 2022, in San Juan, Puerto Rico. The tour consisted of two legs, the first in Latin America and the second leg includes 28 shows in North America, concluding with a headlining record-breaking 14-show run at the José Miguel Agrelot Coliseum in Puerto Rico. They further performed in 2023 as part of music festivals throughout Latin America and North America.

== Tour dates ==
Date	City	Country	Venue
Leg 1 – Latin America
May 27, 2022	Medellin	Colombia	Estadio Atanasio Giradot
May 28, 2022 (Note: Part of Sueños Festival 2022)	Chicago	United States	Grant Park
June 10, 2022	Asuncion	Paraguay	Jockey Club
June 11, 2022	Santa Cruz	Bolivia	Fexpo Arena
June 12, 2022	Buenos Aires	Argentina	Movistar Arena
June 14, 2022	Buenos Aires	Argentina	Movistar Arena
June 17, 2022	Trujillo	Peru	Estadio Mansiche
June 18, 2022	Lima	Peru	Jockey Club
June 21, 2022	Santiago	Chile	Movistar Arena
June 23, 2022	Santiago	Chile	Movistar Arena
June 24, 2022	Santiago	Chile	Movistar Arena
June 26, 2022	La Paz	Bolivia	Estadio Hernando Siles
July 9, 2022	Santo Domingo	Dominican Republic	Estadio Quisqueya
July 15, 2022	Bogota	Colombia	Movistar Arena
July 16, 2022	Bogota	Colombia	Movistar Arena
July 29, 2022	San Salvador	El Salvador	Estadio Cuscatlan
July 30, 2022	Ciudad de Guatemala	Guatemala	Explanada Cayala
August 13, 2022 (Note: Part of Baja Fest 2022)	Rosarito	Mexico	Rosarito Beach
August 20, 2022	Rosarito	Mexico	Rosarito Beach
August 24, 2022	Guadalajara	Mexico	Telemex Auditorium
August 25, 2022	Ciudad de Mexico	Mexico	Mexico City Arena
August 26, 2022	Ciudad de Mexico	Mexico	Mexico City Arena
August 27, 2022	Monterrey	Mexico	Monterrey Arena
August 28, 2022	Monterrey	Mexico	Monterrey Arena
September 1, 2022	Ciudad de Panama	Panama	Plaza Figali
September 2, 2022	Cali	Colombia	Estadio Olimpico Pascual Guerrero
September 3, 2022	Caracas	Venezuela	Estacionamiento del Poliedro de Caracas
September 9, 2022	Quito	Ecuador	Estadio Olimpico Atahualpa
September 10, 2022	Guayaquil	Ecuador	Estadio Alberto Spencer
September 11, 2022	Azogues	Ecuador	Estadio Jorge Andrade Cantos
Leg 2 – North America
September 30, 2022	Miami	United States	FTX Arena
October 1, 2022	Orlando	United States	Amway Center
October 2, 2022	Duluth	United States	Gas South Arena
October 3, 2022 (Note: Originally scheduled for September 30, but was rescheduled due to Hurricane Ian.)	Orlando	United States	Amway Center
October 6, 2022	Uncasville	United States	Mohegan Sun Arena
October 7, 2022	Allentown	United States	PPL Center
October 8, 2022	New York City	United States	Madison Square Garden
October 13, 2022	Fairfax	United States	EagleBank Arena
October 14, 2022	Atlantic City	United States	Hard Rock Live
October 15, 2022	Boston	United States	Agganis Arena
October 19, 2022	Toronto	Canada	Coca-Cola Coliseum
October 20, 2022	Laval	Canada	Place Bell
October 23, 2022	Rosemont	United States	Allstate Arena
October 27, 2022	Irving	United States	Toyota Music Factory
October 28, 2022	Sugar Land	United States	Smart Financial Centre
October 29, 2022	San Antonio	United States	AT&T Center
November 3, 2022	Hidalgo	United States	Payne Arena
November 4, 2022	Hidalgo	United States	Payne Arena
November 5, 2022	Laredo	United States	Sames Auto Arena
November 10, 2022	El Paso	United States	Don Haskins Center
November 11, 2022	Phoenix	United States	Arizona Financial Theatre
November 13, 2022	San Diego	United States	Viejas Arena
November 18, 2022	Las Vegas	United States	MGM Grand Garden Arena
November 19, 2022	Reno	United States	Reno Events Center
November 20, 2022	Oakland	United States	Oakland Arena
November 23, 2022	Fresno	United States	Save Mart Center
November 25, 2022	Ontario	United States	Toyota Arena
November 26, 2022	Los Angeles	United States	Crypto.com Arena
Leg 3 – Puerto Rico
December 2, 2022	San Juan	Puerto Rico	José Miguel Agrelot Coliseum
December 3, 2022	San Juan	Puerto Rico	José Miguel Agrelot Coliseum
December 4, 2022	San Juan	Puerto Rico	José Miguel Agrelot Coliseum
December 9, 2022	San Juan	Puerto Rico	José Miguel Agrelot Coliseum
December 10, 2022	San Juan	Puerto Rico	José Miguel Agrelot Coliseum
December 11, 2022	San Juan	Puerto Rico	José Miguel Agrelot Coliseum
December 16, 2022	San Juan	Puerto Rico	José Miguel Agrelot Coliseum
December 17, 2022	San Juan	Puerto Rico	José Miguel Agrelot Coliseum
December 18, 2022	San Juan	Puerto Rico	José Miguel Agrelot Coliseum
December 22, 2022	San Juan	Puerto Rico	José Miguel Agrelot Coliseum
December 23, 2022	San Juan	Puerto Rico	José Miguel Agrelot Coliseum
December 29, 2022	San Juan	Puerto Rico	José Miguel Agrelot Coliseum
December 30, 2022	San Juan	Puerto Rico	José Miguel Agrelot Coliseum
December 31, 2022	San Juan	Puerto Rico	José Miguel Agrelot Coliseum
Leg 4 – Music festivals
February 18, 2023 (Note: Part of Metroconcierto de conciertos de Carnaval 2023)	Barranquilla	Colombia	Estadio Romelio Martínez
February 21, 2023 (Note: Part of Conzumel Carnaval Music Festival 2023)	Conzumel	Mexico	Estacionamiento De La Administración Portuaria Integral de Quintana Roo
February 25, 2023 (Note: Part of EL CHOLI SE MUDA A MEDELLÍN music festival)	Medellin	Colombia	Estadio Atanasio Giradot
March 17, 2023 (Note: Part of Calibash 2023)	Las Vegas	United States	T-Mobile Arena
March 31, 2023 (Note: Part of Tecate Pal Norte 2023 Festival)	Monterrey	Mexico	Parque Fundidora
May 4, 2023 (Note: Part of Miami Grand Prix 2023)	Hollywood	United States	Hard Rock Live
May 20, 2023 (Note: Part of Reggaeton Lima Festival 2023)	Lima	Peru	Estadio San Marcos
May 24, 2023	Ciudad de Mexico	Mexico	Foro del Sol
May 27, 2023 (Note: Part of Sueños El Festival Latino)	Chicago	United States	Grant Park
May 28, 2023 (Note: Part of Fuego Fuego Latin Music Festival 2023)	Montreal	Canada	Esplanade du Parc Olympique
August 5, 2023	Tijuana	Mexico	Estadio Caliente
August 6, 2023 (Note: Part of Feria Nacional Potosina 2023)	San Luis Potosí	Mexico	Explanada del Teatro del Pueblo
August 11, 2023 (Note: Part of Baja Beach Festival 2023)	Rosarito	Mexico	Papas & Beer Grounds
August 12, 2023	Puebla	Mexico	Explanada del CCU
August 18, 2023	Guadalajara	Mexico	Arena VFG
August 19, 2023 (Note: Part of Dale Mixx 2023 Festival)	Monterrey	Mexico	Parque Fundidora
September 2, 2023 (Note: Part of Reggaeton Lima Festival 2023)	Lima	Peru	Estadio San Marcos
September 3, 2023 (Note: Part of Super Festival)	Santiago	Chile	Hipódromo de Chile
November 18, 2023 (Note: Part of Tecate Sonoro Festival 2023)	Hermosillo	Mexico	Parque La Ruina
November 25, 2023 (Note: Part of Coca Cola Flow Fest 2023)	Mexico City	Mexico	Autodromo Hermano Rodriguez
