= Túnel =

Studio album by La Secta AllStar
- Released: 2003
- Genre: Rock en español
- Label: Universal Latino

La Secta AllStar chronology
Una Noche (2002)	Túnel (2003)	Consejo (2005)

Túnel is the third studio album by the Puerto Rican rock band La Secta, released in 2003 by Universal Latino.

== Track listing ==
1. "Túnel de Amor"
2. "Solo Quiero Darte Amor"
3. "Como No"
4. "Music"
5. "Pecar Por Tí"
6. "Aquí Te Espero"
7. "Stay"
8. "Hey Corazón"
9. "Dando Vueltas"
10. "Todo Sabe Mal"
11. "Far Away"
12. "Rosas y Espinas"
13. "Come On"

== Awards ==
Túnel received a Lo Nuestro Award for Best Rock Album.
