= Lito & Polaco =

Puerto Rican hip hop duo

- Also known as: El Dúo Más Violento; Los Reyes de la Tiraera; Los Más Duros
- Origin: Carolina, Puerto Rico
- Genres: Hip hop; hardcore hip hop; conscious hip hop; reggaeton
- Years active: 1998–2005; 2014–2015
- Labels: Pina; Universal Latino

Lito & Polaco were a Puerto Rican hip hop duo from Carolina, Puerto Rico.

== Musical careers ==
Lito y Polaco were discovered in the early 1990s by Spanish-language hip hop and reggaeton pioneer DJ Eric Industry. They formed part of the hip hop/reggaeton group "La Industria" alongside MC Ceja, Jackie, TNT, Prieto Valdez and others.

In 1998, Lito y Polaco became increasingly frustrated with their lack of pay and focus from DJ Eric being part of La Industria (MC Ceja and Big Boy were DJ Eric's prime artists at the time), thus they decided to leave and form their famous duo, eventually signing with Pina Records in 1999. There was much hype surrounding Lito y Polaco's signing with the Pina Records record label especially because of the company's top star Don Chezina bringing a high-profile to the imprint. Immediately, the duo made a huge impact in the underground scene of Spanish Hip Hop and Reggaeton with hit singles such as "Jenga Jenga", "In The Deadline", "Sucesos", "Maniatica Sexual" and "Mundo Frio". Their albums from 2000–2004 under Pina Records all went double platinum in Puerto Rico including "Masacrando Mc's", "Mundo Frio" and "Fuera De Serie"; the last album being distributed by Universal Latino and the most successful product from the legendary duo internationally.

In 2005, the duo separate amicably in order to pursue ambitions as solo artists. Lito MC Cassidy remained under Pina Records and collaborating with fellow artists RKM y Ken-Y and Nicky Jam. Lito never released a solo album under Pina Records and left in 2007 after a financial dispute. He continued to release mixtapes under his own imprint "La Republica" until present time. Polaco signed with Héctor el Father's record label 'Gold Star Music' in 2005 and achieved moderate success during this time touring worldwide with Héctor and being featured on high-profile records and albums such as "Sonando" featuring Freeway, "Mas Flow 2", "Gold Star Presents: La Familia" and "Los Rompediscotecas". Once Héctor el Father left the music industry to pursue his faith in Jesus Christ, Polaco became an independent artist and remains one to present time. In 2013 Polaco released a mixtape "Back To The Underground: Polakan Edition" under the record label White Lion. The duo have recently reunited in 2015 and announced a new album accompanied by an international tour.

== Awards ==
The duo's Mundo Frío album was nominated for Billboard's Latin Rap Album of the Year but lost to El General Is Back by El General.

== Legacy and musical content ==
Lito y Polaco were renowned for their diverse subject matter and versatile musical styles in the realm of hip hop and reggaeton. Songs such as "Sucesos", "Mirate Al Espejo", "Ella Vive Sola" (featuring Gustavo Laureano of La Secta All-Stars) and "Mundo Frio" are praised for their socially conscious lyrics containing themes about poverty, social injustice, morality, and Sexually Transmitted Diseases (STD's). Lito y Polaco are well known for many commercial reggaeton hits as well including songs such as "Maniatica Sexual", "Rosando Con Mi Piel" featuring Nicky Jam, and "Gata Traicionera" featuring Jacob which have typical reggaeton themes of love and sex alongside a danceable rhythm. The duo also had many lyrical rap battles with some of the genre's most renowned artists, most famously against Tego Calderon, Vico- C, Arcángel and Tempo. Throughout their careers, Lito y Polaco were often praised for their lyrics as MCs and are considered some of the best lyricists in the history of Hip-Hop En Español.

Lito y Polaco are generally regarded as one of, if not the most influential duo in reggaeton history paving the path for future reggaeton duos such as Wisin & Yandel, R.K.M & Ken-Y, and Arcángel & De la Ghetto.

== Discography ==
=== Discography as a duo ===
- Masacrando MC's (2000)
- Los Éxitos Vol. 1 (2001)
- Mundo Frío (2002)
- Fuera de Serie (2004)
- Fuera de Serie Live (2005)

Mixtapes/EP Digital

- 2010: La Institucion
- 2015: El Reencuentro

=== Lito MC Cassidy: Álbumes ===
- Rompecuello - Mixtape (2005)
- De La Calle Pa' La Calle - Mixtape (2007)
- Prologo a Historias de la Calle (2013)
- Historias de la Calle (2013)
- La Jaula de Los Vivos (2021)

=== Polaco: Álbumes ===
- El Taltaro - Mixtape (2007)
- El Undertaker (2010)
- Back To The Underground - Polakan Edition (2013)
- Mendoza y Ortega - EP (2020)
- Trampeao (2024)

== Singles ==
=== Singles as a duo ===
- Jenga Jenga (1998)
- Testimonio De La Calle (2001)
- Maniática Sexual (2001)
- Mundo Frío (2002)
- Piensan (2002)
- Rosando Con Mi Piel (featuring Nicky Jam) (2002)
- Esta Noche Quiero Darte (featuring Speedy) (2002)
- Mírate Al Espejo (2002)
- La Gritona (2002)
- Si Ella Es Brava (2003)
- Los Cerdos (2003)
- Ojos de Diabla (featuring Divino) (2004)
- Gata Traicionera (featuring Jacob) (2004)
- Ella Vive Sola (featuring La Secta AllStar) (2004)
- Mis Chavos (2008)
- Respeto (Official Remix) (2011)
- Rapper 4 Life (2011)
- No Me Mates (2012)
- Se Van (2014)
- Levántate (2014)
- Romper Duro (2014)
- Fanática del Closet (featuring Sujeto) (2014)

=== Lito MC Cassidy's singles ===
- El Gran Robo (featuring Daddy Yankee) (2002)
- Bocon (2005)
- Vender Droga (2005)
- Me Converti en un Criminal (2006)
- Los Matamos Como En Hollywood (featuring Toxic Crow, Cromo) (2006)
- Hot Shit (tiraera a Raphy Pina) (2006)
- Te Sacamos Alas (2009)
- La Republica (2010)
- Fin Del Mundo (featuring H-Merced) (2010)
- Ambición Callejera (featuring Algenis) (2010)

=== Polaco's singles ===
- Rosando Con Mi Piel (featuring Nicky Jam) (2001)
- Con Rabia (2005)
- La Desordená (2005)
- Fuetazo (2006)
- Volvio La Era De La Tiraera (tiraera a Don Omar, Arcángel) (2006)
- Here We Go Yo Remix (featuring Wisin & Yandel, Héctor el Father, Yomo & Jay-Z) (2006)
- R.I.P. Arcangel (Tiraera pa Arcángel) (2007)
- Romper Culo (2007)
- La Última (Sepultura pa Arcángel) (2008)
- Palgo (Pentagono: Return) (2008)
- El Mundo Es Nuestro (featuring Cosculluela, Yomo, J-King & Maximan, Latin Crew, Syko "El Terror", Chyno Nyno) (2008)
- Bienvenido A Mi Mundo (Remix) (featuring Nova & Jory, Cosculluela, Guelo Star, Ñejo, Eloy, Zion, Franco "El Gorila", MC Ceja, Chyno Nyno, Syko "El Terror")
- Si La Vida Me Trata Mal (featuring Endo & Lele) (Official Remix) (2010)
- Si No Te Dejas Ver (featuring Los Santos) (2010)
- De Chamaquito Yo (Official Remix) (featuring Ñengo Flow, Randy Glock, Gotay, Franco "El Gorila") (2011)
- Danger (Official Remix) (featuring Kendo Kaponi, Julio Voltio, Arcángel, Gringo, Jomar, Pacho & Cirilo, Ñengo Flow, Daddy Yankee)
- Tiempos (Official Remix) (featuring Farruko, Yomo)
