= MC Ceja =

Puerto Rican hip hop singer

- Born: Alberto Mendoza Nieves; February 15, 1978 (age 48); Arecibo, Puerto Rico
- Genres: Hip hop; Reggaeton
- Occupations: Rapper; singer
- Years active: 1994–present
- Label: Get Low Records

Alberto Mendoza Nieves (born February 15, 1978), also known as MC Ceja, is a Puerto Rican rapper and singer. He is also known as El Cejón due to his heavy eyebrows.

== Biography ==
MC Ceja was born in Arecibo, Puerto Rico, and was raised both in Brooklyn, New York City and Puerto Rico alongside his younger brother and sister. His brother, called "Cejita", died in a car accident in 2006. When Alberto was 13 years old, he started performing in talent shows and local parties. He also started composing songs which made fun of teachers and classmates.

His breakthrough came when he met reggaeton producer DJ Eric over the telephone, and by playing one of his songs he was able to grab DJ Eric's attention. Back in the day when recordings were made on underground cassettes, Ceja released a song called "Dame Ese Blunt". From then on Ceja started to appear in productions such as Hip Hop Reggae Mix, Street Style 1, Street Style 2, and Soca.He was also a major part in DJ Eric Industry Volumes 3, 4, 5 which produced many memorable songs from MC Ceja like, "Jingle, Jangle" "So Good", "No Paciencia", "Mueve Tu Figura de Campeona (Shalalalong)".

=== Luz Solar ===
In 1996, Ceja launched his first solo album called Luz Solar, selling over 50,000 copies. "Confusión" was part of this production and was number 1 in the charts for at least 10 weeks. He also released a video for this song, which lasted about 11 weeks.

During his time collaborating with DJ Eric, MC Ceja met Lito & Polaco. These later form the group known as Los Tres Mosqueteros. In addition, whilst recording with DJ Eric a lyrical war started between them and the group from The Noise, which had artists such as Baby Rasta & Gringo and Bebe. This war went on for a couple of years and was not resolved until only a couple of years ago.

=== Todo Ha Cambiado ===
In 1998, before the release of the collaborated album Los Tres Mosqueteros, Ceja was able to produce another solo album called Todo Ha Cambiado, producing another hit single, "The Breaks (Te Invito al Party)". Los 3 Mosqueteros was released with collaborations from MC Ceja, and Lito & Polaco. Producing one hit song together with a video release called "Chicas Interesadas". Shortly after the release of Todo Ha Cambiado problems arise within the players from DJ Eric Industry causing them to split and start a war among themselves. This after having worked together for some odd years. Reasons for their split have always been rumored and non-factual. They have recently got back together.

=== Boricua's State of Mind ===
Upon his release, he went back into the studio with DJ Eric and produced his third solo album, Boricua's State of Mind, which was released in 2001, with the single "Desnúdate" featuring Wisin & Yandel.

=== Luz Solar 2 ===
MC Ceja released a new album called Luz Solar 2 in 2008, more than 11 years after his debut album, Luz Solar.

=== Como Antes ===
In 2013, MC Ceja released "Como Antes", with collaborations with Ivy Queen, Voltio, Guelo Star and more.

=== Collaborations ===
He composed some more songs for collaborations such as La Conspiración Vol. 1, The Company and La Conspiración Vol 2, with hits such as "Yeah, Yeah" and "Dile a El". Ceja also demonstrated his rough style hip-hop in Daddy Yankee's El Cartel II. MC Ceja has had the opportunity to record with well-known artists such as Tempo, Ivy Queen, Kamekazi, Big Boy, Baby Rasta, Special Ed, BF Yaviah, Getto & Gastam, among others. Ceja also appeared in various artist compilations such as Majestic, La Mision 1 – 3, DJ Frank: Time to Kill with the song "No Has Oido", Da Cream, Warriors 2, Wise Da' Gansta, Dream Team, and The Sopranos.

In 2003, Ceja moved to the United States, taking some time off from his career, to spend time with his newborn son and a daughter. In 2005, he collaborated with Cuban Link on Buddha's Family 2: Desde la Prison. MC Ceja appeared in a production with three songs, among them his single, "Mr. Conflicto".

== Discography ==
=== Studio albums ===
- Luz Solar (1996)
- Todo Ha Cambiado (1998)
- Boricua's State of Mind (2001)
- Luz Solar 2 (2008)
- Como Antes (2013)
- King Mendo (2018)

=== Collaborations ===
- Hip Hop Reggae Mix
- Street Style 1
- Street Style 2
- DJ Eric Industry, Vol. 1
- DJ Eric Industry, Vol. 2
- DJ Eric Industry, Vol. 3
- DJ Eric Industry, Vol. 4: The Return
- DJ Eric Industry, Vol. 5: Coming to Attack
- Los 3 Mosqueteros: With Lito MC Cassidy & Polaco
- DJ Eric Industry, Vol. 6: All Stars
- La Conspiración, Vol. 1
- La Conspiración, Vol. 2
- El Cartel II
- Da Cream
- The Warriors 2: Batalla En Dos Tiempos
