= La Última Misión =

Studio album by Wisin & Yandel
- Released: September 30, 2022; December 2, 2022 (re-release)
- Genre: Latin trap; reggaeton
- Length: 1:21:01
- Language: Spanish
- Label: Sony Latin
- Producer: Wisin & Yandel; Los Legendarios; Tainy

Wisin & Yandel chronology
Los Campeones del Pueblo (2018)	La Última Misión (2022)

Singles from La Última Misión
- 1. "Chica Bombastic" Released: October 18, 2019; 2. "Ganas de Ti" Released: February 29, 2020; 3. "Recordar" Released: December 2, 2021; 4. "No Se Olvida" Released: February 10, 2022; 5. "Besos Moja2" Released: September 29, 2022; 6. "Vapor" Released: October 25, 2022

La Última Misión (transl. The Last Mission) is the tenth and final studio album by Puerto Rican music duo Wisin & Yandel. It was released on September 30, 2022, by Sony Music Latin. This album announced that they are breaking up.

== Track listing ==
No.	Title	Length
1.	"Intro"	3:41
2.	"Todos Quieren Bailar Contigo"	3:36
3.	"Vapor" (with Rauw Alejandro)	3:29
4.	"Se Vuelve Loca"	2:56
5.	"Party y Alcohol" (with Chencho Corleone)	3:14
6.	"Caliente"	4:34
7.	"Culpables los Dos" (with Ozuna)	3:24
8.	"Delitos"	4:14
9.	"Besos Moja2" (with Rosalía)	3:49
10.	"La Realidad" (with J Balvin)	3:35
11.	"Un Ladrón" (with Prince Royce)	4:15
12.	"Te Fuiste" (with Jay Wheeler)	3:46
13.	"Miami" (with Jennifer Lopez)	2:55
14.	"No Sales de Mi Cabeza" (featuring Sean Paul)	3:37
15.	"Borracho y Loco"	4:07
16.	"Desierto"	2:50
17.	"No Se Olvida"	4:11
18.	"Chica Bombastic"	3:13
19.	"Recordar"	3:53
20.	"Llueve" (with Sech and Jhayco)	4:10
21.	"Ganas de Ti" (with Sech)	3:46
22.	"Buscándote"	3:47
Total length:		1:21:01

== Charts ==
Chart (2022)	Peak position
Spanish Albums (Promusicae)	19
US Top Latin Albums (Billboard)	14
US Latin Rhythm Albums (Billboard)	9

== Certifications ==
Region	Certification	Certified units/sales
United States (RIAA)	Gold (Latin)	30,000^{‡}
^{‡} Sales+streaming figures based on certification alone.
