= Wilkins (singer) =

Puerto Rican singer

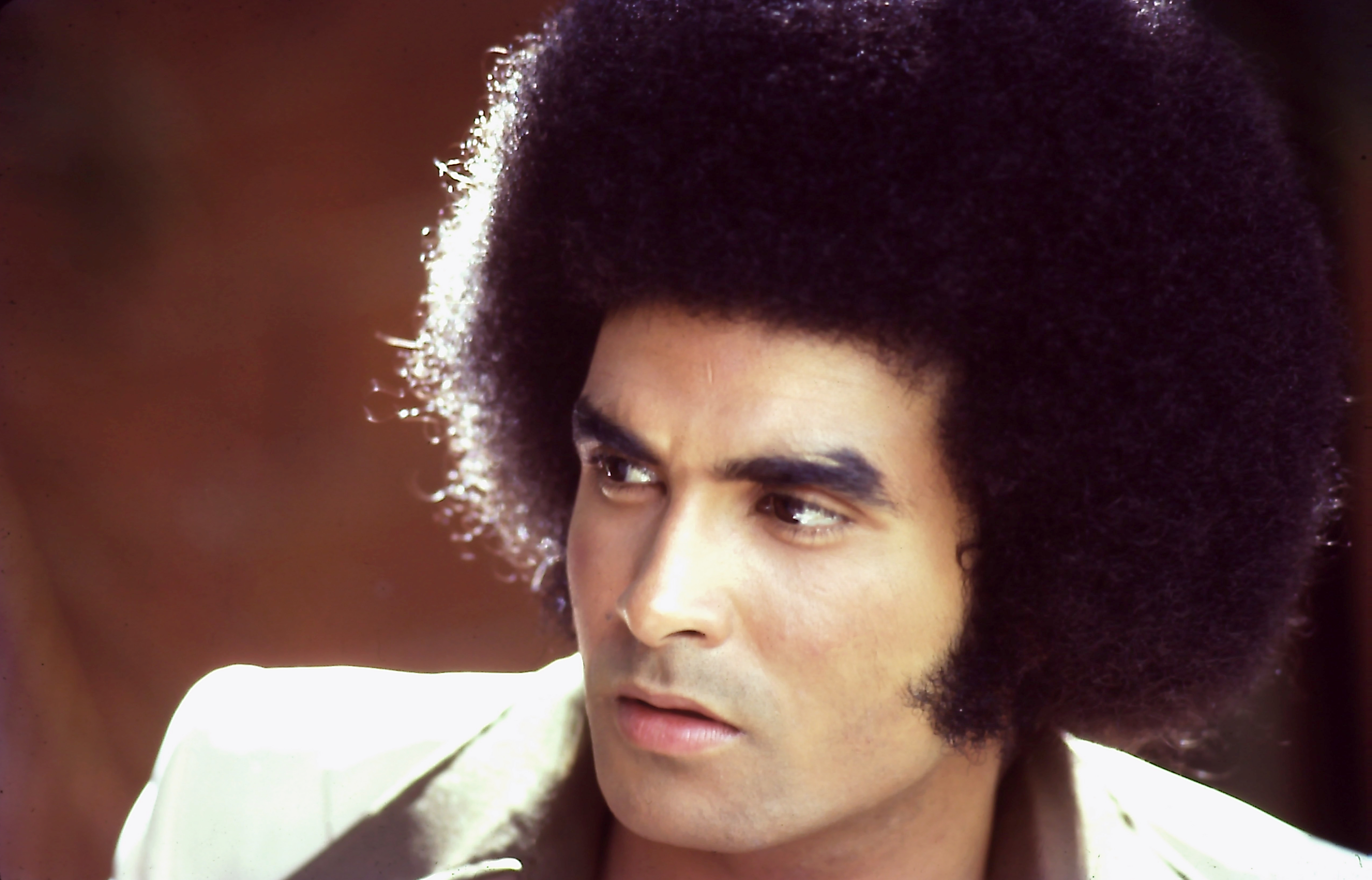
- Wilkins in the 1970s

Background information
- Born: Germán Wilkins Vélez Ramírez; March 10, 1953 (age 73); Mayagüez, Puerto Rico
- Genres: Pop, Latin, tropical music
- Occupations: Singer, composer
- Years active: 1968–present
- Labels: Masa Records (1978–present); EMI (1998); Masa Records (1995–present); BMG (1991–1995); WEA Latina (1987–1990); Masa Records

Germán Wilkins Vélez Ramírez (born March 10, 1953), professionally known as Wilkins, is a Puerto Rican pop music singer and composer.

== Early years ==
Vélez Ramírez was born in Mayagüez, Puerto Rico, but raised in Mexico City, Mexico. His father, Germán Vélez Forestier, was a radio announcer and part-time singer (he was Mon Rivera's singing partner at the beginning of Mon's career in El Duo Huasteca). As a child, Wilkins enjoyed putting on a "show" for his loved ones, which included his sister Bruni Vélez, who would later become a newscaster and TV journalist in Puerto Rico. Wilkins joined the high school choir where he sang solo. During his free time, he sang as back-up for local groups.

== Back in Puerto Rico ==
The family returned to Puerto Rico in 1971, and while seeking a degree in Biology at the University of Puerto Rico - Mayaguez, Wilkins decided to pursue a formal singing career. In 1973, Wilkins made his recording debut with an album titled Wilkins (produced by Tito Puente), which was followed in 1974 and in 1975 with the recordings of the albums Por Tu Rumbo (By Your Path) and a second Wilkins, respectively. The albums' successes were followed by several successful concerts, both in Puerto Rico and Latin America. Wilkins' music has also been popular in Germany and Japan. Wilkins became the first pop music performer to sing in the Luis A. Ferré Performing Arts Center in San Juan, Puerto Rico, which was only reserved for classical music performers.

In 1980, Wilkins released Respiraré (I Will Breathe) which was named best recording of the year by ASCAP. He was twice named by Billboard and ASCAP as the singer and composer of the year. In 1988, Wilkins participated in the film Salsa, as a homeless person, starring Robby Rosa alongside the likes of Celia Cruz and Tito Puente. In the movie, he sang the song "Margarita", which he composed and which is also included in his Paraiso Perdido album. "Margarita" became one of his greatest "hits" and he won Gold Record Awards in Puerto Rico, Latin America, the United States, Norway, Sweden, Germany, Greece, Egypt, South Africa and the Philippines.

== Lambada ==
External audio
- You may listen to Wilkins' "Margarita" on YouTube.

In the 1980s, a dance craze called the "Lambada" (The Forbidden Dance) spread across the world. Wilkins sang the Latin version of the song, which became a huge success. In 1984, Wilkins included the "Lambada (Llorando Se Fue)" in his album of 15 tracks titled Una Historia Importante (An Important Story).

In 1991, Wilkins' song "Sopa de Caracol" (Conch Soup), co-produced by Emilio Estefan, reached the German "Hit Parade List" and over 25,000 people attended a concert that he gave in Berlin, after the fall of the Berlin Wall.

== Tragedy ==
Wilkins suffered a personal tragedy when his young son Gabriel died of a brain tumor at the age of 19. Wilkins stayed away from the music world for three years. In 1995, he recorded El Amor Es Mas Fuerte (The Love is Stronger) which won a "Tu Musica Award" as best album of the year. He was also awarded the Dominican Republic's Casandra Award that same year. He then made his official comeback with a sold-out concert at San Juan's Hiram Bithorn Stadium, formerly the biggest concert and sports venue in Puerto Rico. That same year he also won another Gold Record Award for the recording of Wilkins-Leyenda, which consists of a set of four CDs with 70 songs. In the 1990s, he released several other successful albums such as Pole-Pole and held a concert in El Morro fortress in San Juan. In 2005, Wilkins released his 43rd album, Tu Fan, recorded in Italy. Wilkins has won over 23 Gold Record and 10 Platinum Record Awards over the years.

In November 2006, Wilkins released a Greatest Hits collection, featuring a DVD with 17 music videos and five new songs, called Disco de Oro: Cuatro Décadas de Éxitos y Cinco Nuevas Canciones.

In December 2007, Wilkins held a press conference in Puerto Rico to announce his retirement from music after 40 years of career. He said the decision stems from his desire to take care of his nephew (son of Wilkins' sister, Bruni Vélez, who died in 2006) and his mother.

== Personal life ==
Wilkins has been married four times. He had a son, Gabriel, with his first wife, who died in 1994 of a brain tumor. His sister, Bruni Velez, died in 2006 from Lou Gehrig's disease at the age of 55. Wilkins recorded a song dedicated to her, called "Te Extraño" ("I Miss You") that is included in his latest album "Disco de Oro".

== See also ==
- List of Puerto Ricans
- List of Puerto Rican songwriters
- Music of Puerto Rico
