= Getto & Gastam =

Puerto Rican rap/reggaetón duo

- Origin: Puerto Rico
- Genres: Hip hop, reggaeton
- Years active: 1999-present
- Labels: Buddha's Productions; Sony Music
- Members: Getto (Raul Antonio Lozada); Gastam (Vicente Gaztambide)

Getto & Gastam or alternatively Getto y Gastam are a rap/reggaeton duo made up of Getto (Raul Antonio Lozada) from Río Piedras and Gastam (Vicente Gaztambide) from Ponce, Puerto Rico, respectively. The duo is signed to Buddha's Productions and have been involve in the infamous clash with Pina Records.

Getto was born in 1975 in Río Piedras and moved to New Jersey when he was just nine years old. There he developed an interest in rap and reggae music. He has made various guest appearances in Tempo's Game Over and New Game albums along with Gastam in other various artists compilations.

Gastam is from Ponce, Puerto Rico and started singing in his school choir when he was eight years old. As a child he showed interest in music due to his father being a musician. He first discovered rap at age 12 when introduced to Vico C and Rubén DJ. In 1994 he met Tempo and performs on stage with him. Later when Tempo began recording his first CD he puts Gastam in contact with Buddha from Buddha's Productions who then gives him the opportunity to guest rap in Tempo's next two albums.

== Discography ==
As a duo

- 2002: Vida Eterna
- 2011: Old School Classic – Mixtape
- 2011: El Family The Mixtape

Gastam

- 2009: El Mono De Raza – Mi Trayectoria
- 2013: Solo The Album

Getto

- 2010: The Real Rider

=== Appearances ===
As a duo

- 2001: Buddha's Family – "Buddha's Family"
- 2004: El Bando Korrupto 2 – "¿Pa' Qué Guerrear?"
- 2004: Majestic II – "La Abusadora"
- 2004: Real – "Vas A Morir" (Ivy Queen featuring Getto & Gastam)
- 2004: Kilates 2 – "Tendrán Que Retirarse"
- 2004: Clase Aparte – "Débiles Quítense"
- 2004: The Noise 10 – "Tu Piel Me Provoca"
- 2005: El Desquite – "No Respondo"
- 2005: Buddha's Family 2 – "No Problemas", "Hoy Voy Por Ti"
- 2005: Reggaeton Nítido – "Nos Conocimos"
- 2006: Non-Stop Reggaeton Hits Vol. 2 – "Olvídate De Él"
- 2007: El Mono De Raza – "Quieren Guerrear Conmigo"
- 2007: Los Capo – "Bailando"
- 2008: Chosen Few III: The Movie – "Free Tempo (Remix)" (Featuring Tempo, Barrigton Leavy, MC Ceja, Mexicano 777) (also appears in 209 compilation album Free Tempo
- 2011: Los Mackiavelikos HD – "Morir Perriando" (Yaga & Mackie Featuring Getto & Gastam)
- 2011: El Family The Mixtape – El Que Perdona y Nunca Olvida
- 2011: El Family The Mixtape – Tenemos lo que Hace Falta
- 2014: – No Todo Es
- 2017: – Mañana
- 2018: – Familia es Familia (Tempo featuring Getto & Gastam)
