= Tempo (rapper) =

Puerto Rican rapper (born 1977)

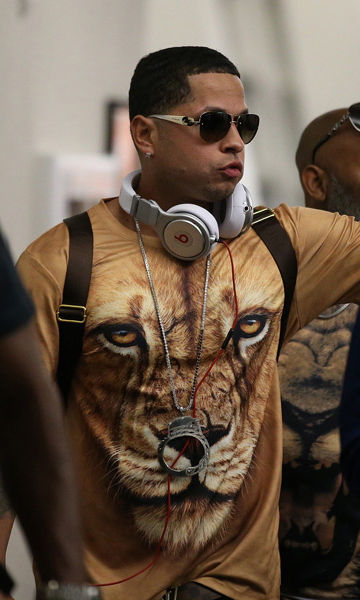
- Tempo in 2013

Background information
- Also known as: El Narco Hampón; El Rey de la Perla del Sur; El Rey del Área Sur; El León del Área Sur
- Born: David Sánchez Badillo; September 25, 1977 (age 49); Ponce, Puerto Rico
- Genres: Reggaeton; Latin hip hop; gangsta rap; Latin trap
- Occupations: Rapper; songwriter
- Years active: 1995–present
- Labels: Free Tempo LLC; Sony BMG; Buddha's Productions; Free Music Inc.

David Sánchez Badillo (born September 25, 1977), known professionally as Tempo, is a Puerto Rican rapper. He was the leading figure in the reggaeton scene from the late 1990s until his arrest in 2002. He was released in 2013 after spending 11 years in prison. Although Tempo had success during the emergence of reggaeton, his popularity faded following his imprisonment; he is nowadays regarded as a controversial figure within the genre.

== Early life ==
David Sánchez Badillo was born in Ponce, Puerto Rico, in 1977. Tempo studied at Escuela Libre de Música de Ponce. When Tempo was five, his family moved to upstate Haverstraw, New York. They lived in Rockland County for four years and returned to Puerto Rico when Tempo was nine years old. He began writing rap lyrics at the age of 11.

== Career ==
=== Beginnings (1995–1998) ===
Tempo first appeared in DJ Joe Volume 3 (1995) and year later in DJ Joe Volume 4. Initially, Tempo was a member of El Escuadron Del Panico (The Panic Squadron) alongside artists Master Joe, OG Black, Genio, Trebol Clan, and Ranking Stone. DJ Joe was the group's musical producer. Despite underground recognition and a hit single with "Figura De Campeona" (Figure of a Champion) alongside DJ Joe, Tempo was not satisfied with his musical prospects and joined the Nuyorican rap group S.P.I.C. (Spanish People In Control). S.P.I.C. was produced by veteran hip hop promoter, producer, and artist James De La Raza.

Tempo returned to Puerto Rico to restart his solo career in 1998 and again collaborated with El Escuadron Del Panico. Around this time, thanks to his burgeoning friendship and performances with Mexicano 777, Tempo met DJ Playero. Tempo was added to DJ Playero's roster and he recorded "Bailando Quiero Verlas" (I Want to See Them [Ladies] Dancing) in 1998 which was released on DJ Playero's album Playero 41: Past Present & Future. Tempo's first song with DJ Playero was a collaboration with Mexicano 777—"Hagan Ruido Las Pistolas" (Make Noise Pistols); it is considered one of the classic Latin hip hop diss tracks.

=== Career highlights (1999–2002) ===
Tempo released Game Over in 1999 on the Buddha's Productions label; the album had appearances by Héctor & Tito and MC Ceja. New Game was released the next year and had appearances by Baby Rasta & Gringo and Maicol & Manuel. Both albums achieved gold record certification. Tempo also acted as co-producer on the album Buddha's Family, which again received a gold record certification. He produced the album Vida Eterna for Getto & Gastam in 2002. During this time he also recorded "El Que Tenia Que Llegar" for DJ Frank's Time to Kill, "Empiezo La Accion" for Boricuas NY 2 and "Tu Y Quien Mas" for the compilation album from Alex Gárgolas titled Gargolas, Vol 3.

By 2001, Tempo was the most successful hip hop and reggaeton artist in Puerto Rico with multiple gold and platinum certified albums. On the island he outsold mainstream Puerto Rican acts such as Chayanne and Ricky Martin. In an interview with Alofoke, Tempo said that Sony Latin representatives sought the artist out in Puerto Rico and managed to get him a meeting with legendary record executive Tommy Mottola via videophone. Tempo received an undisclosed seven digit sum from Sony to sign for a multiple album deal.

The Éxitos compilation was released by Sony in 2002 and contained a mix of old and new material. Éxitos sold over 500,000 copies worldwide. It was re-released digitally by Tempo's independent label.

=== Free Tempo and imprisonment (2002–2013) ===
On October 10, 2002, Tempo was arrested and subsequently sentenced to 24 years in prison for alleged drug trafficking and conspiracy to commit such acts. This was subsequently reduced to 14 years under an agreement with the prosecutor. While in prison, previously recorded songs were released on various compilation albums: "Quien Quiere Guerra" was featured on Desafio in 2004, and "Van A Ver Lo Que Es Muerte" was released on Las Plagas 2 in 2003. In 2004 the song "Que Es Lo Que Quiere" was released on DJ Nelson's Flow La Discoteka.

Tempo completed his album deal with Sony by releasing the Free Tempo album from prison in June 2009, which included the hit single "Deja Que Hable El Dembow" featuring Wisin y Yandel. The album received a nomination for Best Long Form Music Video at the 10th Annual Latin Grammy Awards for the video which featured the London Symphony Orchestra.

=== Release and probation (2013–present) ===
Tempo was released from prison on October 9, 2013, and was required to live at a halfway house in Puerto Rico for six months to finish his sentence. During this time he was able to record the mixtape Free Music; it was released as a free download on his official website on December 21, 2013.

His first concert after release was on May 17, 2014, in the Jose Miguel Agrelot Coliseum.

Tempo's initial releases after prison received mixed reviews. The single "Tu Historia" was released on February 14, 2015, and was considered a return to form for the artist. The song sharply criticizes modern hip hop reggaeton and Tempo's views on how the genre lost its essence in favor of mainstream propaganda.

On September 25, 2018, Tempo released the album Back To The Game.

== Discography ==
=== Studio ===
- 1999: Game Over
- 2000: New Game
- 2009: Free Tempo
- 2018: Back to the Game
- 2020: Tempo es Tempo (EP)
- 2022: Tempo es Tempo 2 (EP)
- 2023: Tempo es Tempo 3 (EP)
- 2024: Tempo es Tempo 4 (EP)

=== Compilation ===
- 2002: Éxitos (greatest hits album)
- 2013: Free Music (mixtape)

=== Live ===
- 1995: Lirios del Sur Underground Live (with K-2 Young) (bootleg) (digital release)
- 2001: Unplugged (bootleg) (digital release)

=== Producer credits ===
- 2001: Buddha's Family
- 2002: Vida Eterna
