= La Secta AllStar =

Español band

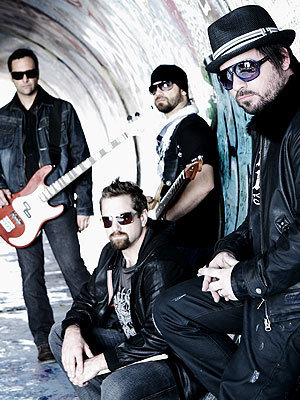
- La Secta Allstar (Mark Kilpatrick, John Lengel, Mike Genao & Gustavo Laureano)

Background information
- Origin: Puerto Rico
- Genres: Rock en español, indie-rock
- Years active: 1997–present
- Members: Mark Kilpatrick; John Lengel; Mike Genao; Gustavo Laureano
- Past members: Carlos Figueroa (guitar), Giovanni Perdomo (guitar)
- Website: LaSectaAllStar.com

La Secta AllStar (or simply La Secta) is a rock en Español band from Puerto Rico. The band members are Mark Kilpatrick (bass guitar), Gustavo Laureano (singer), John Lengel (drums), and Mike Genao (guitar). They are known mostly for the song "La Locura Automática".

== Band history ==
Mark Kilpatrick and Gustavo Laureano met in Orlando, Florida where they studied sound engineering. After graduating they moved to Miami Beach and started working. They also began rehearsing in a local warehouse along with drummer John Lengel and guitarist Carlos Figueroa. They soon began writing and composing their songs and started playing at local clubs in Miami and Puerto Rico. It is during this time that artists like Ricky Martin and Ednita Nazario discovered them. In 1995, Martin recorded the song "Bombón de Azúcar" and in 1996, Nazario recorded "Ultima Vez", also written by Laureano.

José Fernández Camilo became their manager and introduced them to producer Jorge Álvarez. Alvarez then introduced them to Andrés Levin, and La Secta Allstar signed a record deal with Fonovisa soon after. Their debut album, Aniquila, was released in 1997 producing four Top 40 hit singles: "Se Acabó", "Recompensa", "Nunca Jamás" and "Bombón de Azúcar". This album was re-released in 1999 under the title Bombón de Azúcar. The main difference is that the new album did not include the songs "Si Tú No Estás" and "Mar y Marea". These were in turn substituted by the Spanglish version of "Bombón de Azúcar" and a new track titled "Luna de Día". Bombón de Azúcar was again re-released in 2007 with the addition of "Mar y Marea" while "Si Tú No Estás" has not been rereleased.

In January 2001, the band presented a sold-out concert at the Roberto Clemente Coliseum in San Juan. After this and the success of this first album, the band released the follow-up titled La Secta Allstar in April 2001. This album was recorded and produced by the band itself. Four days after the release, the album had already sold 25,000 copies. The single "Dame Lo Que Quieras" peaked at local radio stations and won an ASCAP Award.

In 2004, the band released a fourth album titled Túnel. The album won a Premio Lo Nuestro award in the category of Best Rock Album. Shortly after guitarist Carlos Figueroa left the band, and Mike Genao replaced him, and the band then released their fifth album, Consejo, with Universal Latino. Consejo is the most successful album from La Secta. The album was certified Gold and Platinum under the RIAA in only two months after its release. The mega hit "La Locura Automática", reached No. 1 in more than 13 countries (5 months No. 1 in Colombia). The album featured collaborations with many noted artists like Wilkins and reggaeton artists Wisin & Yandel. A remix of "La Locura Automática" can be found on 12 Discípulos, a reggaeton album produced by Eddie Dee, and on the Deluxe Edition of Consejo (along with another remix and a bonus DVD). Consejo was also nominated to a Latin Grammy as Best Latin Rock/Alternative Album and a Premio Lo Nuestro award, and won a Billboard Award in the Best Rock/Alternative Band category.

After touring heavily for this album, the band decided to take a small break during which singer Gustavo Laureano released a solo project. In 2008, the band returned with their next album titled Fuego, which won the band a Premio Lo Nuestro in the Rock Album of The Year category, among other awards. By 2013, La Secta was working on the pre-production of "SÚBELO", their new studio album. Finally, the project would not be launched until 2021, when they rejoined as a musical band, being for now, a compilation of singles.

== Band members ==
=== Current members ===
- Gustavo Laureano – lead vocals
- Mark Kilpatrick – bass guitar, vocals
- John Lengel – drums, vocals
- Mike Genao – guitar, vocals

=== Former members ===
- Carlos Figueroa – guitar, vocals
- Giovanni Perdomo – guitar

== Discography ==
- Aniquila (1998)
- Bombón de Azúcar (1999)
- AllStar (2001)
- Una Noche (2002)
- Túnel (2004)
- Consejo (2005)
- Fuego (2008)
- Súbelo (TBA)

Singles

- Solo Quiero Hacer un Gol - Single, recorded for the Copa Libertadores (2009)

Recompilatorios

- El Hit Parade (2006)
- Bombón de Azúcar (Re-release, one bonus track) (2007)
- Greatest Hits Part 2 (2007)

== See also ==
- Puerto Rican rock
