= Baby Rasta & Gringo =

Puerto Rican reggaeton duo

- Also known as: The Eazy Boyz; Los Lobos
- Origin: San Juan, Puerto Rico
- Genre: Reggaeton
- Years active: 1994–2005; 2008–present
- Labels: Sony Latin; Ganda Entertainment

Baby Rasta & Gringo is a Puerto Rican reggaeton duo formed in 1994 in Las Monjas, Hato Rey, Puerto Rico.

Originally known as "the Eazy Boyz", they've released five studio albums since 1994 but have had various collaborations prior to 1998. Most of these collaborations were with DJ Negro, a collection of albums that were divided in volumes titled The Noise.

== History ==
Baby Rasta is named Wilmer Alicea and Gringo is named Samuel Gerena. They started in 1994 in Hato Rey as 'the Eazy Boyz', but they didn't debut in the market until 1998 after changing their name with New Prophecy. By their second album, Fire Live, released in 2003, the two were known for their confrontational diss tracks aimed at artists such as Hector & Tito, Wisin & Yandel, Don Omar, and many others. In 2004, when the duo began feuding amongst themselves, it resulted in a three-year split that would follow the release of their first studio album, Sentenciados. The Comeback was the title of their 2008 second studio album. In 2015, they released Los Cotiziados has collaborations with Alexis & Fido, Tito El Bambino, Farruko, Wisin, Nicky Jam, and Divino. The song 'Un Beso' of the release, became number one in countries such as Honduras, Chile, Peru, and other countries. They are also known as 'Los Lobos'.

== Discography ==
=== Studio albums ===
- Sentenciados (2004)
- Los Cotizados (2015)
- The Hunting (2023)
- El Final (2025)

=== Live albums ===
- Live Desde El Mas Allá (1997)
- Fire Live (2003)

=== Compilation albums ===
- The Comeback (2008)

=== Produced albums ===
- New Prophecy (1998)
- Romances Del Ruido (2000)
- Romances Del Ruido 2 (2002)
