= Cupido (Ivy Queen song) =

2013 single by Ivy Queen

Single by Ivy Queen

from the album Musa
- Released: September 16, 2013
- Recorded: 2012
- Genre: Bachata
- Length: 3:35
- Label: Ivy Queen Musa Sound, Venevision
- Songwriters: Martha Pesante, Edwin Perez, Pedro Polanco
- Producer: Edwin "EZP" Perez

Ivy Queen singles chronology
"Vamos A Celebrar" (2012)	"Cupido" (2013)	"Cuando Las Mujeres" (2014)

"Cupido" (English: Cupid) is a song by Puerto Rican reggaetón recording artist Ivy Queen, from her eighth studio album, Musa (2012).

It was composed by Queen and Edwin Perez, along with Pedro Polanco, produced Perez under his stage name "EZP" and released as the second single from the album on September 16, 2013, following "Peligro De Extinción".

== Background and composition ==
Ivy Queen "Cupido" (2013)
A 21-second sample of "Cupido", the second single from the album.

Ivy Queen told Efe that the composition process started while she was heartbroken at home. Her emotions then burst out in the recording studio. She wrote 26 songs for Drama Queen, her previous and seventh studio album, in which only 16 appear, "Cupido" brings together the lasting ten she composed during this period in her life.

== Release and promotion ==
The song was released to radio on September 16, 2013 as the second single from the album. Following the single's release and Queen's nomination for Best Urban Music Album at the Latin Grammy Awards of 2013, the song became popular on American radio stations. The song was performed live on Univision's Sábado Gigante.

== Reception ==
"Cupido" is a bachata song, that features romantic lyrics, mixed acoustic and electric instrumentation, Afro-Latin influences, and hand drums according to the Music Genome Project. According to La Voz De Houston, the song is a "romantic and passionate" bachata number. The magazine later claimed the song to be "extraordinary" and a musical continuation of the bachata songs found on her previous studio album, Drama Queen: "Cosas De La Vida", "Amor A Primera Vista", "La Vida Es Así" and "Dime".

The lyrics tell the story of a woman in search of "love". An editor for Allmusic stated all the songs of the album, including "Cupido" were worthy of inclusion on Queen's next greatest hits album. The song was written by Martha Pesante, Edwin Perez and Pedro Polanco and published by Sony/ATV Music Publishing, LLC. According to Oxigeno, "Cupido" along with "Peligro De Extinción", "Real G4 Life", "No Hay", "A Donde Va", and "Caminando Por La Vida" were the most popular songs off the album.

== Track listing ==
No.	Title	Writer(s)	Producer(s)	Length
1.	"Cupido"	Martha Pesante, Edwin Perez, Pedro Polanco	EZP	3:35
Total length:				3:35
