= Amor Puro =

2010 single by Ivy Queen

Single by Ivy Queen

from the album Drama Queen
- Released: September 24, 2010
- Recorded: 2009–2010; Carolina, Puerto Rico (Mas Flow Studios)
- Genre: Reggaetón, techno
- Length: 3:25
- Label: Machete Music
- Songwriters: Martha Pesante, Hiram Cruz
- Producer: Keko Musik

Ivy Queen singles chronology
"La Vida Es Así" (2010)	"Amor Puro" (2010)	"Peligro De Extinción" (2012)

"Amor Puro" (English: Pure Love) is a song by Puerto Rican reggaetón recording artist Ivy Queen from her seventh studio album Drama Queen (2010). It was written by Queen and Hiram Cruz, produced by Cruz under his stage name Keko Musik and released as the second single from the album on September 24, 2010, following the release of "La Vida Es Así" and its respective bachata version. Lyrically, the song focuses on the true and pure meaning of love hence the title of the song. It was the last single released in promotion for the album, however the single was commercially unsuccessful. The music video for the song was filmed in Miami, Florida, under the direction of Marlon Peña.

== Background ==
After the success of her 2007 effort Sentimiento, which would be certified Platinum by the United States Recording Industry Association of America (RIAA), a substantial live album was distributed by Machete in 2008. This would lead up to Queen signing with the label in April 2010 as the label celebrated its fifth anniversary.

The record signing, described as a 360 deal, includes profit sharing in tours, sponsorships and merchandising. Ivy Queen was previously signed to a distribution deal with Univision Records, which in turn was acquired by Machete's parent company Universal Music Latin Entertainment in 2008. President of Universal Music Latino and Machete, Walter Kolm, commented in a press release "It's a privilege to have Ivy Queen a part of our artistic roster. Ivy is an extraordinary woman with incomparable talent, and she's number one in her genre. We're happy to be able to work with her on her new album as well as future projects". "I'm very proud to be a part of Machete Music. They are a young, vibrant company that has created a name for itself in Latin music in the United States and the world. They are a strong and important company that has been recognized for nurturing their artists’ creative talents," said Ivy Queen, regarding the partnership.

== Composition and recording ==
Ivy Queen "Amor Puro" (2010)
A 26-second sample of the album's second single, "Amor Puro". The song's lyrics focus on the meaning of pure love. It has been described as "uplifting" by David Jeffries of Allmusic.

"Amor Puro" was written by Ivy Queen and Hiram Cruz, the latter who also produced the track. Composed in a minor key, the song features romantic lyrics, a string ensemble and elements of techno music, in the form of synthesizers. Its lyrics focus on the meaning of true love. Queen sings: "Pure love does not fight, it does not hurt you, love that is pure does not cause you to fall". She described the song as "an honest statement of what love is". Which, according to Terra Networks is a departure from the themes of heartbreak which have characterized her past hits. According to Univision, the song showcases her more "sensible and romantic side". She later claimed to song to be "impactful because it is a very strong subject, but real" like her. Ivy Queen told Efe that the composition process started while she was heartbroken at home. Her emotions were then released in the recording studio. She added the song brings together 26 songs others she wrote during this period. Recording sessions for "Amor Puro" along with the rest of the album took place at Mas Flow Studios in Carolina, Puerto Rico between 2008 and mid-2010. In October 2008 a release date of either February or March 2009 was confirmed by Queen, who had finished five songs for the album at the time, this included "Amor Puro" along with the other tracks not featuring guest artist; however, she did not finished the collaborations until later. Production of the album was handled by a roster of urban artists, including the Latin Grammy Award-winning production team of Luny Tunes, Noriega, Tainy, DJ Blass, Mad Music, R.K.O and Keko Musik (who produced over half the album including "Amor Puro").

== Music video and other media ==
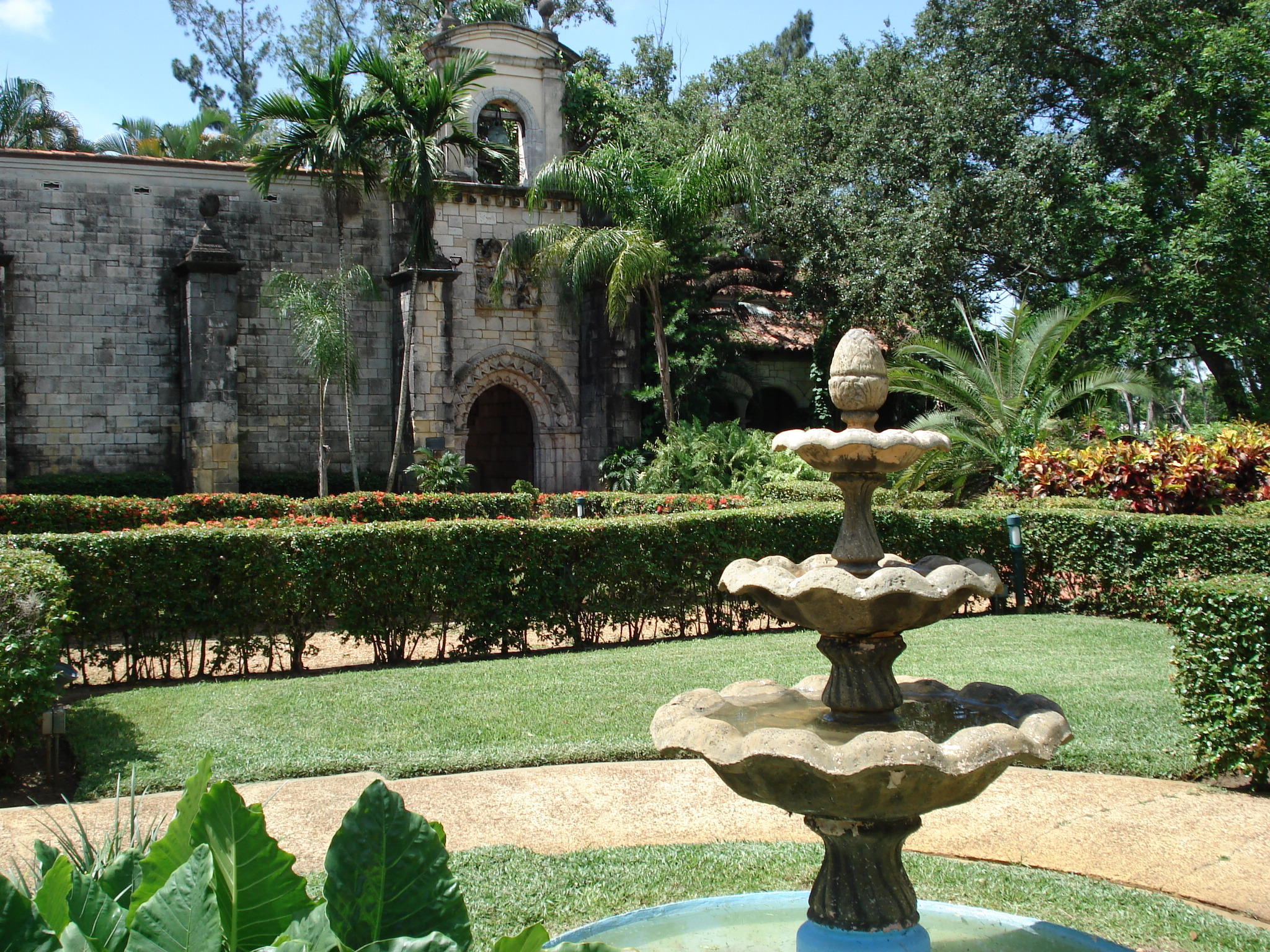
Ancient Spanish Monastery of St Bernard De Clairvaux Cloisters.

The music video for "Amor Puro" was filmed on September 28, 2010, and premiered on VEVO on November 30, 2010. It was released on December 14, 2010, on iTunes. Direction and production was handled by Marlon Peña who has also directed Queen's music videos for "Te He Querido, Te He Llorado", "Que Lloren", "Dime" and "La Vida Es Así". The video was shot in Miami, at St. Bernard de Clairvaux Church, a historic building built in 1133 in the town of Sacramenia, Segovia, Spain. In 1925, the monastery was dismantled and sent in more than 11,000 crates to Brooklyn, New York. 26 years later, in 1952, they were sent to South Florida, where the building was re-assembled piece by piece with a modern cost of 20 million U.S. dollars. As of December 2024, the video has over 11 million views on the video sharing website YouTube. The song makes an appearance in Rosella Rhine's 2014 fictional novel Murder by Wheelchair.

== Track listing ==
No.	Title	Writer(s)	Producer(s)	Length
1.	"Amor Puro"	Martha Pesante, Hiram Cruz	Keko Musik	3:25
Total length:				3:25
