= No Hay =

Song by Ivy Queen

Single by Ivy Queen

from the album Musa
- Released: August 19, 2014
- Recorded: 2012
- Genre: Reggaetón
- Length: 3:36
- Label: Siente Music, Ivy Queen Musa Sound, Venevision, Universal Music Latino
- Songwriters: Martha Pesante, Hiram Cruz
- Producer: Keko Musik

Ivy Queen singles chronology
"Cuando Las Mujeres" (2014)	"No Hay" (2014)	"Soy Libre" (2014)

"No Hay" (English: There Is Nothing), stylized as "No Hay!!!" is a song by Puerto Rican reggaetón recording artist Ivy Queen, from her eighth studio album, Musa (2012). It was composed by Queen and Hiram Cruz, produced by Cruz under his stage name Keko Musik. For the week of May 3, 2014, the song debuted at number 23 on the Billboard Latin Rhythm Airplay chart. The official remix features J Alvarez.

== Background ==
Ivy Queen told Efe that the composition process started while she was heartbroken at home. Her emotions then burst out in the recording studio. She wrote 26 songs for Drama Queen, her previous and seventh studio album, in which only 16 appear, "No Hay" brings together the lasting ten she composed during this period in her life. She explained that, "The expectations I have with this album are quite realistic and can not be other than success and this is due to something that I did not think was possible without technology and the Internet". She says the two years away from the media has helped her, not just emotionally but mentally as well. "I like it, I think it is the best way to separate Ivelisse and Ivy Queen". She indicated that the album is "very mature and complete," because even though "her style is urban and the most predominant themes of reggaeton it also features fusions of rhythms and instruments that make their own style". She said she didn't want to sing just one genre of music but rather alternate between various. "I love music in general and this, when the album was born of my loins; I let the muse flow and there came my ten issues".

== Reception ==
On January 19, 2013, Ivy Queen's graphic designer Jhony Chavez, said via Twitter that the cover of "No Hay" would, "leave many with their mouths open, She looks fucking hot" after having a conversation with Queen on the status-sharing site that debated if they should post the picture of Musa that was supposed to be used as the album's cover, when a fan asked about the cover of the second single, thus indicating "No Hay" to be a single. However, "Cupido" was selected as the second single from the album, and it was serviced to radio on September 26, 2013. "Cuando Las Mujeres" followed as the album's third single on March 11, 2014.

"No Hay" received mainly positive reactions from music critics. While reviewing the parent album, David Jeffries of Allmusic said "Hard-hitting cuts like "No Hay!!!" boom with that street attitude and the Queen's stern delivery". Though later claimed "Real G4 Life" to top it and the rest of the tracks on the album. He also noted its worthiness along with the other songs to be included on her next "best of". Finally, he listed the track along with "Peligro De Extinción", "La Killer" and "Real G4 Life" as album highlights. David Gee from Corillo Magazine praised the remix to the song with J Alvarez claiming Alvarez's unique singing style combined with Queen's equally unique style come together relatively well". He complained about the featuring being used on a two-year-old song rather than a new single, however. Composed in minor key tonality, danceable grooves, angry-romantic lyrics, synthetic instrumentation, Afro-Latin influences, reggae influences and techno synths according to the Music Genome Project.

== Charts ==
On the week of May 3, 2014, the song debuted at number 23 on the Billboard Latin Rhythm Airplay chart. Prior to the remix version's single release on August 19, 2014, the song had accumulated over 126,000 downloads on elgenero.com.

Chart (2014)	Peak Position
US Latin Rhythm Airplay (Billboard)	23
US Latin Rhythm Digital Songs (Billboard)	21
