= Musa (album) =

2012 studio album by Ivy Queen

Studio album by Ivy Queen
- Released: August 21, 2012
- Recorded: November 2011–2012
- Genre: Latin pop
- Length: 33:08
- Language: Spanish
- Label: Siente Music
- Producer: Luny Tunes, Noriega, Predikador, DJ Nelson, Keko Musik, EZP

Ivy Queen chronology
Drama Queen (2010)	Musa (2012)	Vendetta (2015)

Singles from Musa
- 1. "Peligro de Extinción" Released: June 19, 2012; 2. "Cupido" Released: September 16, 2013; 3. "Cuando Las Mujeres" Released: March 11, 2014; 4. "No Hay" Released: August 19, 2014

Musa (English: Muse) is the eighth studio album by Puerto Rican reggaetón singer-songwriter Ivy Queen. It was released through Siente Music on August 21, 2012 in all formats. The tracks on the album were composed by Queen and various other songwriters, including: Victor Delgado, Hiram Cruz and Francisco Saldaña. The album was produced by Luny Tunes, Noriega, Predikador, and DJ Nelson among others. The album features a variety of musical styles prominent on her previous albums Sentimiento (2007) and Drama Queen (2010).

The recording produced four singles. "Peligro de Extinción" was released as the lead single on June 19, 2012. It peaked at number 18, 21, and 84 on the Billboard Latin Rhythm Airplay, Billboard Latin Rhythm Digital Songs, and Billboard Tropical Songs charts respectively. Musa debuted and peaked at number fifteen on the Billboard Top Latin Albums chart and number four on the Billboard Latin Rhythm Albums chart. It was followed by "Cupido", "Cuando Las Mujeres" and later "No Hay".

Upon its release, the album remained within the top five best-selling albums of the urban genre, in the United States and Puerto Rico, according to SoundScan monitoring services of the recognized measurement firm Nielsen. The album was included at number six on Rhapsody's Top 15 Latin Albums of Late Summer 2012 and number nine on Rhapsody's Top 30 Latin Albums of 2012.

== Background ==
After the success of her 2007 effort Sentimiento, which spawned the Top 10 hit "Que Lloren" and was later certified Platinum by the United States Recording Industry Association of America (RIAA), a substantial live album, Ivy Queen 2008 World Tour LIVE! was distributed by Machete in 2008. Subsequently, Queen signed a new record deal with the label in April 2010 as it celebrated its fifth anniversary to release her next studio album Drama Queen. The signing, described as a 360 deal, includes profit sharing in tours, sponsorships and merchandising. Ivy Queen was previously signed to a distribution deal with Univision Records, which in turn was acquired by Machete's parent company Universal Music Latin Entertainment in 2008.

The president of Universal Music Latino and Machete, Walter Kolm, commented in a press release "It's a privilege to have Ivy Queen be a part of our artistic roster. Ivy is an extraordinary woman with incomparable talent, and she's number one in her genre. We're happy to be able to work with her on her new album as well as future projects". "I'm very proud to be a part of Machete Music. They are a young, vibrant company that has created a name for itself in Latin music in the United States and the world. They are a strong and important company that has been recognized for nurturing their artists’ creative talents," said Ivy Queen, regarding the partnership. However even with all this, it was reported that Queen had signed with Siente Music.

Ivy Queen told Efe that the composition process started while she was heartbroken at home. Her emotions then burst out in the recording studio. She wrote 26 songs for Drama Queen in which only 16 appear, the lasting ten are used for Musa. She explained that "The expectations I have with this album are quite realistic and can not be other than success and this is due to something that I did not think was possible without technology and the Internet". She says the two years away from the media has helped her, not just emotionally but mentally as well. "I like it, I think it is the best way to separate Ivelisse and Ivy Queen". She indicated that the album is "very mature and complete," because even though "her style is urban and the most predominant themes of reggaeton it also features fusions of rhythms and instruments that make their own style." "I did not want to lock in to the reggaeton genre or singing just one genre. I had to address more than just one 'target' or a musical style as such. I love music in general and this, when the album was born of my loins; I let the muse flow and there came my ten issues."

== Recording and production ==
Musa was produced mainly by Keko Musik, with additional production by Luny Tunes, DJ Nelson, Noriega, Predikador, DJ Nelson and EZP Perez. Ivy Queen also co-produced one track on the album "Caminando Por La Vida". Queen was given a guitar and Keko Musik asked if she would like to learn how to play it. He informed her that she would have to cut her signature nails, and she did to play the guitar.

When recording sessions for Musa ended, Queen was finishing production for the album. She then realized that she was recording her album at the same place where Ñengo Flow was recording his respective album. Ñengo then asked Queen if she ever needed him that he was there and they then recorded "Real G4 Life".

== Musical composition ==
"No Hay" was composed in minor key tonality. It features danceable grooves, synthetic instrumentation and techno synths. Lyrically, the song features angry-romantic themes and takes influences from Afro-Latin and reggae sources. "Peligro De Extinción" was composed by Queen herself with the help of Víctor Delgado and one half of the Dominican reggaetón production duo Luny Tunes, Francisco Saldaña, known as Luny. The song blends reggaetón with the sounds of cumbia and vallenato. The song is composed in major key tonality and features simple harmonic progressions, an acoustic guitar, accordion (or bandoneon) playing, prominent percussion and romantic lyrics. The Afro-Latin influenced "Como Bailo Yo" was composed in minor key, while synthetic instrumentation, techno synths, synthesizers, and prominent percussion compose the track musically, lyrically, the song contains erotic themes.

"A Donde Va" contains bowed strings with a string ensemble, an electric piano playing, ambient synthesizers, a brass horn ensemble and hand drums. The song was composed in minor key tonality with influences being taken from Afro-Latin and reggae music. "La Killer", categorized by catchy hooks and erotic themes, was composed in minor key tonality, with many of the same features as the previous tracks on the album. However, the song only contains simpler harmonic progressions. "Cuando Las Mujeres" was composed in minor key tonality and features simple harmonic progressions, danceable grooves, synthetic instrumentation, Afro-Latin influences, reggae influences, techno synths, synthesizers, and prominent percussion.

"Cupido", the album's second single, features male backup vocals. The bachata song also features romantic themes with mixed acoustic and electric instrumentation. Hand drums are also prominent on the song with influences from Afro-Latin music. The social-politically charged ballad "Caminando Por La Vida" features synthetic instrumentation, an acoustic guitar, bowed strings, a string ensemble, and hand drums. Lastly, the song was composed in major key tonality. It also contains elements of rock, folk and rap music.

== Release and promotion ==
The album was released in all formats, digitally and physically on August 21, 2012. On February 8, 2012, a video was posted on Ivy Queen's official Facebook, Twitter, and YouTube. It was a preview of Musa, containing a piece of the intro of Drama Queen: "Listen To My Drama" and a roughly 20 to 25-second audio recording of "Peligro de Extinción" (Danger of Extinction). The song was then released to Puerto Rico radio stations on March 24, 2012, and premiered that same day on La Nueva 94.FM during the radio show "El Coyote The Show". It was released digitally on June 19, 2012 in the United States and on June 26, 2012 in Spain and Germany. The music video for "Peligro De Extincion" was filmed on August 18, 2012 in Miami and was directed by Marlon Pena. The music video premiered on WAPA at 4 pm on September 28, 2012.

On January 19, 2013, Ivy Queen's graphic designer Jhony Chavez, said via Twitter that the cover of "No Hay" would "leave many with their mouths open, She looks fucking hot" after having a conversation with Queen on the status-sharing site that debated if they should post the picture of Musa that was supposed to be used as the album's cover, when a fan asked about the cover of the second single, thus indicating "No Hay" to be a single. However, "Cupido" was selected as the second single from the album, and it was serviced to radio on September 26, 2013. "Cuando Las Mujeres" followed as the album's third single on March 11, 2014. The official cover art was revealed through Twitter on July 7, 2012. The album was promoted with a television commercial, which was released on August 1, 2012.

== Commercial performance ==
The recording debuted on the Billboard Top Latin Albums chart at number 15 on the week of September 8, 2012. It also reached number four on the Billboard Latin Rhythm Albums chart in 2012. On the week of February 22, 2014, the album re-entered the Latin Rhythm Albums chart at number two behind Yandel's De Líder a Leyenda. Upon its release, the album has remained within the five best-selling albums of the urban genre, in the United States and Puerto Rico, according to SoundScan monitoring services of the recognized measurement firm Nielsen. However, it was the lowest first week sales for Queen since the release of her fourth studio album Real in 2004. Due to the success of Queen's 2014 tour "Viva Puerto Rico Tour", the album reentered the Billboard Latin Albums chart at number thirty-six for the week of February 9, 2014.

On the Billboard Latin Rhythm Airplay chart, the lead single, "Peligro de Extinción" debuted at No. 21 for the week of June 26, 2012. It peaked at No. 18, spending a total of sixteen weeks on the chart. On the Billboard Latin Rhythm Digital Songs chart, the song debuted and peaked at No. 21 for the issue date of July 7, 2012, becoming Queen's third single on that chart after "La Vida es Así" and "Acércate" reached No. 2 and No. 16 respectively. On the issue date of November 24, 2012, the song debuted and peaked at No. 84 on the Billboard Tropical Songs chart. "No Hay" debuted at number 23 on the Billboard Latin Rhythm Airplay chart for the week of May 3, 2014.

== Reception ==
Professional ratings
Review scores
Source	Rating
Allmusic	4.0/5 stars
Reggaetón Online	4.0/5 stars

David Jeffries of Allmusic gave the album four out of five stars. This was Queen's highest rating from an editor of Allmusic, since her second studio album was give four and a half out of five stars and was named an "Allmusic Album Pick" in 1998. Jeffries began the review by stating that album has the "usual mix of straight-up reggaeton and flirtations with pop and/or R&B" however noted that Latin pop was "more striking and vital". He praised "the polished" "Peligro De Extinción", the "bitter-sweet" "A Donde Va" and the "hard-hitting cuts" "No Hay!!!" and "La Killer". He, however stated "Real G4 Life" tops them all. He described the song, which "slowly slithers out of the speakers and winding about the room like a serpent about to strike." He also added that all were "worth inclusion" on Ivy Queen's next greatest hits album. He ended the review noting the album's shortness in length however stated "it's easier to praise it for being tight and lean than to complain about its brevity". His last line read "Diva-status maintained". Rachel Devitt of Rhapsody commented that "La reina reps "Real G4 Life," swinging hard and heavy in her trademark low, fierce flow. But while she grounds Musa in a thick classicism, Ivy has never been afraid of experimentation, so pop hooks, bits of cumbia and a lot of bachata abound." She went on to say "See booming single "Peligro de Extincion," which seems pretty unlikely, especially when the Queen starts talking about Juliets taking over for Romeos if the boys can't handle it." Judy Cantor-Navas of Google Play said that with the release of Musa, Ivy Queen "remains the genre's top female star and proves again that she can hang with the big boys." She noted that Queen follows similar production of her male-counterparts Daddy Yankee, Don Omar and Wisin & Yandel "with a radio-friendly album heavy on diverse tropical rhythms and lavish dance-pop production." She noted "Cupido" being a bachata track and "Peligro de Extinción," featuring similar musical arrangements with those found Michel Teló's "Ai Se Eu Te Pego. She ended by stating "songs like "Como Bailo Yo" and "La Killer" will satisfy old school reggaetón fans as Ivy Queen again lives up to her royal name." Musa was nominated Best Urban Music Album at the Latin Grammy Awards of 2013.

== Track listing ==
- Standard Edition:

No.	Title	Writer(s)	Producer(s)	Length
1.	"Intro"	Martha Pesante, Hiram Cruz	Keko Musik	1:11
2.	"No Hay!!!"	Pesante, Cruz	Keko Musik	3:36
3.	"Peligro de Extinción"	Pesante, Victor Delgado, Francisco Saldaña	Noriega, Predikador	3:22
4.	"Como Bailo Yo"	Pesante, Cruz	Keko Musik	2:46
5.	"A Donde Va"	Pesante, Cruz	Keko Musik	3:45
6.	"La Killer"	Pesante, Cruz	Keko Musik	3:39
7.	"Cuando Las Mujeres"	Pesante, Mário de Jesús, Nelson Díaz	DJ Nelson	3:24
8.	"Cupido"	Pesante, Edwin Perez, Pedro Polanco	Edwin Perez	3:32
9.	"Caminando X La Vida"	Pesante, Cruz	Ivy Queen, Keko Musik	3:43
10.	"Real G4 Life" (featuring Ñengo Flow)	Pesante, Cruz, Edwin Vázquez	Keko Musik	4:03
Total length:				33:08

== Charts ==
=== Weekly charts ===
Chart (2012)	Peak position
US Top Latin Albums (Billboard)	15
US Latin Rhythm Albums (Billboard)	4

Chart (2014)	Peak position
US Top Latin Albums (Billboard)	36
US Latin Rhythm Albums (Billboard)	2

=== Yearly charts ===
Chart (2012)	Position
US Latin Rhythm Albums (Billboard)	19

== Release history ==
List of release dates, showing region, formats and labels
Region	Date	Format	Label
United States	August 21, 2012	CD, digital download	Siente · Drama
Mexico	September 8, 2012	CD, digital download	Siente · Drama
Spain	October 8, 2012	CD, digital download	Universal
