= Vamos a Celebrar =

"Vamos A Celebrar"

Single by Ivy Queen featuring Víctoria Sanabría
- Released: December 5, 2012
- Recorded: 2012
- Genre: Tropical, salsa
- Length: 3:25
- Label: Ivy Queen Musa Sound, Venevision
- Songwriter: Martha Pesante
- Producer: Moisés Reyes

Ivy Queen singles chronology
"Peligro De Extinción" (2012)	"Vamos A Celebrar" (2012)	"Cupido" (2013)

Víctoria Sanabría singles chronology
"Soy Mujer" (2011)	"Vamos A Celebrar" (2012)	"El Rabito" (2018)

Audio sample
- A 24 second sample of "Vamos a Celebrar" featuring verses by Sanabría and Queen.: file; help

"Vamos A Celebrar" (Spanish, 'Let's Go Celebrate') is a song recorded by Puerto Rican singer Ivy Queen. It was written by Queen and features guest vocals from Víctoria Sanabría, with whom Queen had previously worked with. Lyrically, the song is about celebrating the holidays and traditions of Puerto Rico.

Ivy Queen chose Christmas to bring a message to Puerto Ricans with the song. "Vamos A Celebrar" contains a fusion of Caribbean rhythms mixed with the sound of the plena. The song is the first salsa single by Queen, although she has previously experimented with the genre. It is also the first single released by her not to promote an album.

== Background ==
Ivy Queen participated with Puerto Rican salsa singer Víctoria Sanabría in a rapping contest that took place on El Trovatón, which aired on the broadcasting channel La Mega 106.9FM from Puerto Rico. The encounter resulted in the collaboration of the two female singers on "Vamos A Celebrar". The duo had previously collaborated on "No Te Quiero" for Sanabria's 2009 album Criollo Con Salsa. Queen stated that she did not pay homage to her country before, as well as adding that she found experimenting with her roots to be "interesting".

Queen elaborated that the main purpose of "Vamos A Celebrar" was to keep the Puerto Rican culture far from extinction. She explained that Sanabría was the perfect match to make the song because both were able to "celebrate and bring a message from the heart, happiness and joy." Sanabría indicated that: "From start to finish the song's power increases and increases and remains high until the end. It is very explosive". She said it "affects the Boricua fiber inside all Puerto Ricans making them aware".

== Composition ==
"Vamos A Celebrar" was inspired by the Christmas traditions of Puerto Rico. The song contains a "fusion of Caribbean rhythms with the unique sound of the plena", while incorporating drums and tambourines. Queen previously ventured into salsa in 2005 with "Amiga No Pienes" and "Yo Lamento" and in 2007 with "Si Eres Tú".

== Release and promotion ==
"Vamos A Celebrar" premiered on December 5, 2012 on the radio program El Circo de La Mega, which also airs on the radio station La Mega 106.9FM. It was released digitally the same day. The song was not released in promotion of Queen's eighth studio album, Musa (2012), released months earlier, as it is not found on the album's track list.

== Track listing ==
No.	Title	Writer(s)	Producer(s)	Length
1.	"Vamos A Celebrar" (featuring Víctoria Sanabría)	Martha Pesante	Moíses Reyes	3:25
Total length:				3:25

== Release history ==
List of release dates, showing regions, formats, labels and references
Country	Date	Format	Label
Argentina	December 5, 2012	Digital download	Venevision
Brazil	December 5, 2012	Digital download	Venevision
Canada	December 5, 2012	Digital download	Venevision
Chile	December 5, 2012	Digital download	Venevision
Colombia	December 5, 2012	Digital download	Venevision
France	December 5, 2012	Digital download	Venevision
Germany	December 5, 2012	Digital download	Venevision
Italy	December 5, 2012	Digital download	Venevision
Japan	December 5, 2012	Digital download	Venevision
Mexico	December 5, 2012	Digital download	Venevision
Spain	December 5, 2012	Digital download	Venevision
United Kingdom	December 5, 2012	Digital download	Venevision
United States	December 5, 2012	Digital download	Venevision
