= Drama Queen (Ivy Queen album) =

- Standard edition cover art. The deluxe edition features red instead of gold typeface.

Studio album by Ivy Queen
- Released: July 13, 2010
- Recorded: 2008–2010; Mas Flow Studios (Carolina, Puerto Rico)
- Genres: Reggaetón, bachata, hip hop, R&B
- Length: 48:05
- Language: Spanish
- Label: Machete Music
- Producers: DJ Blass, Escobar, Luny Tunes, Monserrate & DJ Urba, Mad Music, Keko Musik, Noriega, R.K.O, Lenny Santos, Tainy

Ivy Queen chronology
Sentimiento (2007)	Drama Queen (2010)	Musa (2012)

Singles from Drama Queen
- 1. "La Vida Es Así" Released: May 11, 2010; 2. "Amor Puro" Released: September 24, 2010

Drama Queen is the seventh studio album by Puerto Rican reggaeton recording artist Ivy Queen. It was released on July 13, 2010, by Machete Music. The album was written by Queen with help from Rafael Castillo, Marcos Masis and others, while production was handled by Luny Tunes, Tainy and Noriega. The album features collaborations with De La Ghetto, Frank Reyes, Wisin & Yandel and Franco "El Gorila". It features a wide variety of musical styles in common with her previous album, Sentimiento, released three years earlier on a different label.

Selling more than 3,000 units in its first week, Drama Queen debuted and peaked at number 163 on the US Billboard 200 chart, number three on the Billboard Top Latin Albums chart, number one on the Billboard Latin Rhythm Albums chart and number 18 on the Billboard Rap Albums chart. The recording received a Latin Grammy nomination for Best Urban Music Album at the Latin Grammy Awards of 2011 and two nominations at the Billboard Latin Music Awards of 2011. The album garnered mainly positive reviews from critics, who praised the mixture of R&B and reggaeton.

Two singles were released from the album: "La Vida Es Así" and "Amor Puro". The former became a commercial success; it was supplied to Latin radio in urban and bachata versions, reaching the Top 10 in several Spanish-language markets in the United States. The latter, however, failed to gain chart success. A deluxe edition of the recording was released with extra tracks and music videos on August 10, 2010, and marks the last studio album on Machete. The album will be released on vinyl for the first time on January 9, 2026, in celebration of Machete Music's 20th anniversary.

== Background ==
After the success of her 2007 effort Sentimiento, which spawned the Top 10 hit "Que Lloren" and was later certified platinum by the United States Recording Industry Association of America (RIAA), a live album (Ivy Queen 2008 World Tour LIVE!) was distributed by Machete in 2008. The album included a studio track, "Dime", which became Queen's first single to top the Billboard Latin Rhythm Songs chart. It also made her the first female to top the chart.

Queen signed a new record deal with the label in April 2010, as it celebrated its fifth anniversary. The signing, described as a "360 deal", includes profit-sharing in tours, sponsorships and merchandising. Ivy Queen was previously signed to a distribution deal with Univision Records, which was acquired by Machete parent company Universal Music Latin Entertainment in 2008. The president of Universal Music Latino and Machete, Walter Kolm, commented in a press release: "It's a privilege to have Ivy Queen a part of our artistic roster. Ivy is an extraordinary woman with incomparable talent, and she's number one in her genre. We're happy to be able to work with her on her new album as well as future projects". "I'm very proud to be a part of Machete Music. They are a young, vibrant company that has created a name for itself in Latin music in the United States and the world. They are a strong and important company that has been recognized for nurturing their artists’ creative talents", said Queen about the partnership. The album was originally to be released after her third compilation album, Cosa Nostra: Hip-Hop (2006), as a concept album which would have Ivy Queen performing duets with female singers from different genres on new label Filtro Musik. However, this was changed and Sentimiento was released instead. Ivy Queen told Efe that the composition process started while she was heartbroken at home, and her emotions then burst out in the recording studio. She added the album brings together 16 of 26 songs she wrote during this period. When asked by Latina Magazine about the drama between the release of Sentimiento and Drama Queen, Queen said:

I’m single. For the first time in my life, I’m really experiencing what that’s like because I used to always feel the need to be in a relationship; I didn’t like being alone. But this time I’m realizing that people come into your life for a season, and my last relationship served its purpose. I can’t sit here and cry about it, because it ended right where it should have. A lot of that stuff is on the album.

== Recording and production ==
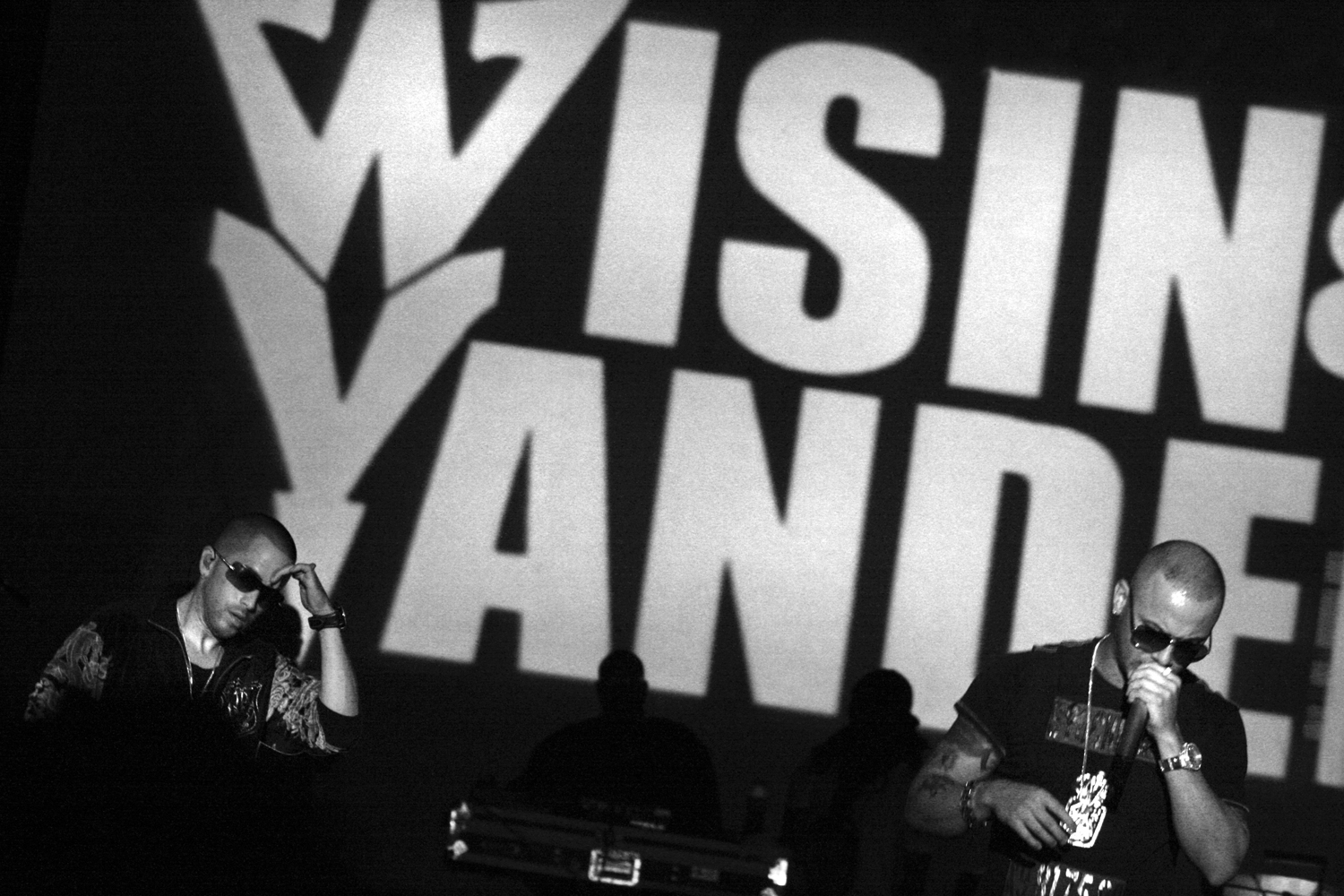
Wisin & Yandel (pictured) collaborated and co-wrote "Acércate" with Ivy Queen and Marcos Masis.

Recording took place at Mas Flow Studios in Carolina, Puerto Rico between 2008 and mid-2010. In October 2008 a release date of either February or March 2009 was confirmed by Queen, who had finished five songs for the album at the time; however, she did not finished the collaborations until later. Production was handled by a roster of urban artists, including the Latin Grammy Award-winning production team of Luny Tunes, Noriega, Tainy, DJ Blass, Mad Music, R.K.O and Keko Musik (who produced over half the album).

Collaborations on the album include Wisin & Yandel on "Acércate"; former Aventura band member Lenny Santos, who plays guitar on "Cosas De La Vida" with Frank Reys on vocals; Franco "El Gorila" on "Jungle"; De La Ghetto on "De La Calle" and Jadiel on "Amor A Primera Vista". Queen said the collaboration with Wisin & Yandel came about from her work on their album, La Revolución (2009). When speaking about the collaboration with Jadiel she said it was a decision she made with her heart: "When I collaborate with colleagues, I don't care who is a hit on the radio and who isn't". The track "I Do" was to originally feature American R&B singer Beyoncé Knowles after Queen signed a contract with International Creative Management (ICM).

== Composition ==
=== Music and themes ===
Drama Queen has been described as "R&B meets reggaeton"; it was the first time Ivy Queen experimented with R&B. Queen explained that the album was half hip hop and half reggaeton but that she had to include extra styles such as R&B and bachata. Musical textures on the album vary from R&B to tropical bachata, pop, rap and reggaeton, a more diverse set of musical styles than on Sentimiento. Themes include "cool & cocky, pool party, TGIF, partying and driving." According to Frances Tirado of Primera Hora, the album demonstrates Queen's vocal maturity and rhythmic evolution. The album's lyrics explore heartbreak, love and the value of women in relationships. It contains original songs with sentimental lyrics, demonstrating Queen's incorporation of musical fusion and sonic evolution (in contrast to her previous studio albums).

=== Song structure and lyrics ===
Ivy Queen "Intro (Listen To My Drama)" (2010)
A 21-second sample of the Spanglish hip-hop track "Intro (Listen To My Drama)".

"Intro (Listen To My Drama)" is in a minor key and features a string ensemble and synthesizers. In the rap, Ivy Queen sings: "1-9-9-3 was the year that I started, Many have seen my rise and fall I've seen many. Vigilant, I have an angel on my back, I have a throne flanked by holy souls." Lyrically, Ivy Queen highlights her position as the queen of reggaeton. "Te Voy A Recordar" (I'm Going To Make You Remember), also in a minor key, also employs a string ensemble and synthesizers. Lyrically, the song describes when the passion in a relationship has been lost. "Me Quiere" (They Like Me) is an R&B power ballad built on a snapping rhythm. Also in a minor key, it features synthesizers and percussion. In the song, Queen says that people listen to her because they like her. The lyrics reveal that when she wants it smooth she puts on R. Kelly, and when she is discontented she plays Mary J. Blige (both of whom Queen has said she would like to work with in the future). The song highlights her hip-hop status. "De La Calle" (From the Street) is an R&B power ballad exploring the love between two people ("love from the street"), with Queen and De La Ghetto reprising their 2006 collaboration on a remix of Luny Tunes' "Noche de Entierro (Nuestro Amor)".

Ivy Queen "I Do" (2010)
A 22-second sample of "I Do": a mid-tempo, English-language pop and R&B ballad

"Amor Puro" (Pure Love) is in a minor key with romantic lyrics, a string ensemble and techno synthesizers. Its lyrics focus on the meaning of true love. Queen sings: "Pure love does not fight, it does not hurt you, love that is pure does not cause you to fall", and described the song as "an honest statement of what love is". "I Do" is a minor-key, mid-tempo pop and R&B power ballad built on a handclapped rhythm and piano. Lyrically, the song is a message to men and women; Queen sings: "My ladies, if you know better, if he loves you, let him come back. My fellas, if you love her, don't let nothing hold you back, run out and look for her". Queen recorded the song in English because she felt the language worked well with the beat. According to an editor for iTunes, the song "puts her message of female empowerment into a glossy pop ballad, complete with English lyrics and Auto-Tuned vocal." The minor-key "Acércate" (Get Closer) features vocals by Wisin & Yandel and synthesizers; it has been described as "pure reggaeton". The song was praised for the presence of Wisin & Yandel and its hook. Queen previously collaborated with Wisin & Yandel on their seventh studio album, La Revolución (2009), with "Perfecto" (which also featured Yaviah).

Ivy Queen "La Vida Es Así" (2010)
A 21-second sample of the video version of lead single "La Vida es Así" which alternates from reggaeton and bachata. It is included as a bonus track on the deluxe edition of the album.

The minor-key "La Vida es Así" (Life Is Like That) features vocal effects and synthesizers. The urban version "attacks" with a modern and aggressive beat; the bachata version is slower, with Luny Tunes' tropical rhythms. In the lyrics, Ivy Queen declares to a rival: "The guy you're dating is mine, and you know it, but here's the detail: He's worthless in bed. That's why I'm here to congratulate you for setting me free, I have to confess". The reggaeton rhymes tell a story of revenge and lovesickness. Angie Romero of Latina Magazine describes the song as a "powerful and pulsating break-up anthem."

"Cuando" (When), also in a minor key, is a pop R&B ballad featuring synthesizers and percussion with Caribbean roots and Afro-Latin influences. It uses electric-guitar riffs, an acoustic guitar, a string orchestra and a piano. In the song, Queen explores what happens when a relationship ends: "Adam sinned because he loved Eve, the love of Celia and Pedro touched the stars, but only when you learn to value women, can you be happy". An editor for iTunes claimed the song's lyrics to be sultry. She stated that of the 16 tracks, "Cuando" means the most to her because it is an R&B-bolero track which would remind men to value women. "Cosas De La Vida" (Things of Life) is a romantic tropical bachata ballad, infused with R&B rhythms: "They are the things of life, don't ask me for an explanation, our love is first, and you know my heart is yours. For the sake of us two, fight for our love against temptation". The track features Queen and Dominican bachata singer Frank Reyes; she expressed her love for the song (and bachata in general), calling it a genre where "men express themselves with women". The minor-key "Cansada" (Tired) showcases Queen's rapping skills, featuring techno synthesizers. Frances Tirado of Primera Hora described it as "pegajosa" ("addictive").

"Jungle" is another minor-key track featuring techno synthesizers, angry lyrics and a sociopolitical theme. Queen raps: "And in this jungle I'm the boss, undoubtedly I run this, you're thirsty, all I want is an adventure." The singer collaborates with Franco "El Gorila" on this track. "Aya Aya" is "an conventional dembow beat, flanked by a sitar." It also combines the sounds of hip hop and Bollywood music. Its Arabic rhythm has been described as inviting to dancers by Primera Hora's Frances Tirado. "Amor A Primera Vista" (Love At First Sight) is a tropical bachata ballad featuring smooth vocals, electric guitar riffs, piano, synthesizers and hand drums. Its roots are Caribbean, with Afro-Latin influences. Puerto Rican singer Jadiel participated in the song's intro while his verse surfaces around the 1:17 mark; the two explore love's power and how love can be good and bad at the same time. "Dime" (Tell Me) is a blend of reggaeton and bachata (known as bachaton or bachateo), a musical genre in the Dominican Republic and Puerto Rico combining bachata melodies and reggaeton-style beats, lyrics, rapping and disc-jockeying. Queen described the song as combining feelings with bachata and urban beats, later claiming the song to be a "sentimental subject where we fused bachata and urban rhythms".

== Release and promotion ==
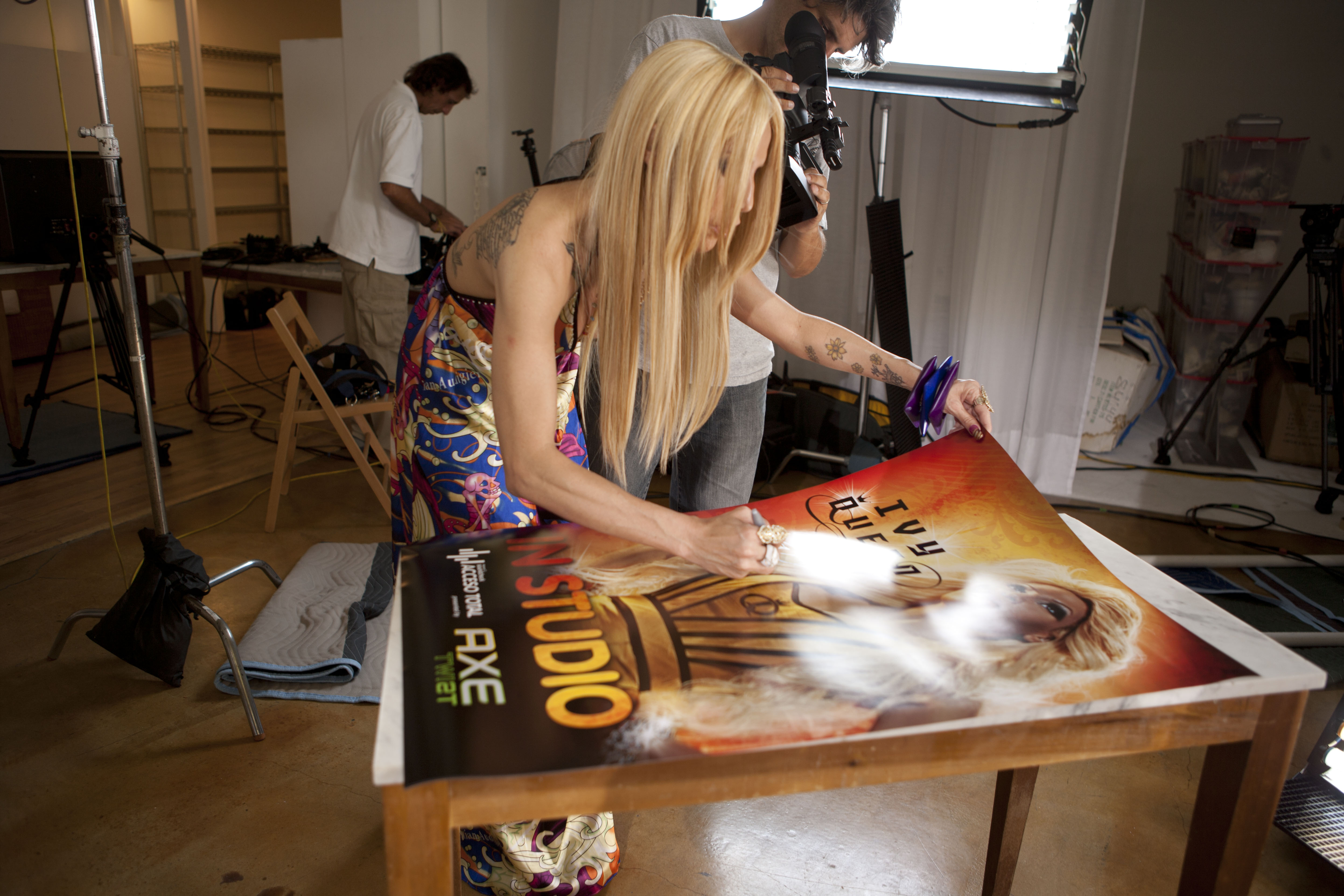
Ivy Queen before a promotional Walmart interview.

Ivy Queen headlined the Machete Music Tour 2010, which performed in cities such as New York and Los Angeles and featured "the hottest stars in reggaeton and Latin urban music", including Chino & Nacho, Flex, Jowell & Randy, Tego Calderon, Don Omar, Cosculluela, Angel & Khriz, J-King & Maximan and R.K.M & Ken-Y. Ivy Queen would usually be the last to perform closing each show. Dressed in a pink miniskirt sporting blonde hair with white boots which reached past her knees, Queen's setlist included. Songs she performed included "Que Lloren", "Dime", "La Vida Es Así" and "Cosa De La Vida". Drama Queen was first promoted in the liner notes of Queen's seventh studio album, Sentimiento (2007), with a picture of Queen with hands bent upward and the words "Drama" and "Queen" on the right and left sides of her body; underneath are the words "Coming Soon" in bold letters. In an effort by Universal Music Latin Entertainment to expand their promotional efforts on the social network MySpace, the album was offered exclusively in full, before its official release, garnering over 100,000 streams. It was released on July 13, 2010; on August 10 a deluxe edition was released, with three new tracks ("Aya Aya"; "Amor A Primera Vista", featuring Jadiel and the hit "Dime") and a DVD with three music videos. "Dime" was originally included on her first live album, Ivy Queen 2008 World Tour LIVE! (2008), with a bachata version of the song. On the album's cover Queen appears on a gargoyle dressed in black, representing a villain. On the inside of the album jacket she is seen with superpowers, dressed in bold colors (such as yellow and pink) and representing a superhero. The singer was inspired by action figures she used to collect and Wonder Woman, of whom she is a fan. A behind the scenes video of Queen during photoshoots for the album's cover was posted on YouTube and has attained over 285,000 views. Following the album's release, she created the "Drama Line", in which fans could call and leave messages and "publicly humiliate their former partner or anyone who has betrayed them in the past".

== Singles ==
The lead single, "La Vida es Así", was released on May 11; the music video (directed by Marlon Pena) was shot on May 17 in Miami and premiered on mun2 on June 22 and VEVO on June 28. Queen said that the genre of bachata is meaningful, since it reveals more feelings. The a cappella version of "La Vida es Así" was sent to Tainy and Keko Musik for production, allowing Queen to pick the version she preferred. The Keko Musik version was later released as a pre-order bonus track for Drama Queen on iTunes. The second single, "Amor Puro" was released for Puerto Rican radio on September 24. The music video (also directed by Marlon Pena) was shot on September 28, and premiered on VEVO November 30. The video was also filmed in Miami, at the Spanish monastery of St. Bernard of Clairvaux (a historic building dating to 1133 in Sacramenia, Segovia, Spain, later reconstructed in Miami). "Acércate" was leaked online before the album was released, the first time Queen experienced copyright infringement in her 15-year career. Originally titled "No Te Equivoques", it was re-recorded in response to the copyright violation and retitled "Acércate". She said, "Sometimes they try to hurt you are when you do well. I'm proud and grateful that Wisin & Yandel have gone with me to the studio to record the song. We have good chemistry and friendship. We tried to change the song and lyrics, but with their agenda, which is tight, and mine too, we could not do it again. We have no idea who hacked, all the music was in a studio and to mobilize it to another was what someone did". The singer appeared on the television program “Don Francisco Presenta”, where she performed "La Vida es Así".

"La Vida Es Así" has two versions: reggaeton and bachata. The reggaeton version became a hit on Latin radio, but the bachata alternative did not chart. On Hot Latin Songs, the song debuted at number 49 on June 6 and peaked at number 11 on August 21. On Latin Pop Airplay, the song debuted at number 33 on July 3 and peaked at number 10 on August 28. On Latin Rhythm Airplay, the song debuted at number 29 on May 22. It reached number one on July 10 (Queen's second number-one single on the chart, replacing "Cuando Me Enamoro" by Enrique Iglesias), and was dislodged by "Cuando Me Enamoro" a week later."Amor Puro" failed to chart. On Hot Latin Songs, "Dime" debuted at number 43 on September 20, 2008, and peaked at number 8 on December 6. On Latin Pop Airplay, the song debuted at number 38 on November 15 and peaked at number 33 on December 13. On Latin Tropical Airplay, the song debuted at number 33 on October 4 and peaked at number 4 on December 6. On Latin Rhythm Airplay, the song debuted at number 22 on August 30. It reached number 1 on October 11 (becoming her first number-one single, replacing "Síguelo" by Wisin & Yandel), and was dethroned by R.K.M & Ken-Y for "Te Regalo Amores" eight weeks later. "Acércate" was not released as a single, although it peaked at number 16 on the Latin Rhythm Digital Songs chart on July 31, 2010.

== Commercial performance ==
Drama Queen sold over 3,000 units in its first week of release, dominating urban album sales for ten consecutive weeks. The album sold 6,000 less copies than Sentimiento, and 2,000 less than 2005's Flashback, in its first week. It debuted (and peaked) at number 163 on the US Billboard 200 chart, number three on Top Latin Albums and number 18 on Rap Albums. The album also debuted at number one on the Billboard Latin Rhythm Albums chart, leading the chart for ten consecutive weeks. It has sold over 25,000 copies.

== Critical reception ==
Professional ratings
Review scores
Source	Rating
Allmusic	3.5/5 stars
Billboard	3.5/5 stars
Starpulse	3.0/5 stars
Reggaeton Online	4.8/5 stars

Drama Queen received a Latin Grammy nomination for Best Urban Music Album at the 2011 Latin Grammy Awards (which was won by Calle 13 for Entren Los Que Quieran). It earned Queen two nominations at the 2011 Latin Billboard Music Awards for Hot Latin Songs Artist of the Year, Female and Top Latin Albums Artist of the Year, Female (both won by Shakira). The album was selected as one of the 50 best Latin albums of the 2010s decade by Billboard magazine.

The album received generally positive reviews. David Jefferies of Allmusic gave the album a score of 3.5 of 5 stars, commenting that the album keeps its sci-fi elements on its cover artwork as Queen keeps her reggaeton strong by sticking with her original formula; he later claimed it was a standard-issue effort. Ayala Ben-Yehuda of Billboard noted that the album features a set filled with a more-honest longing than most of what is heard on commercial Latin radio. She also stated that the album isn't a departure in lyrical content from her previous studio efforts, ultimately awarding the album a score of 3.5 of 5 stars. Billboard's Leila Cobo ranked the album among the top 50 Latin albums of the 2010s decade. Frances Tirado of Primera Hora gave the album a positive review, stating that "Ivy Queen shows vocal maturity and evolution of rhythms". Sarah Bardeen of Rhapsody felt "each track could have been a single."

Jefferies commented on the musical style as well: "The beats are familiar as reggaeton drum machines meet R&B keyboards and the Queen, commanding attention on every track with a stern yet sexy delivery. Bardeen said, "Her authoritative flow is matched only by the evolving landscape of beats that back her -- and Ivy, unlike some of her peers, has not been seduced by the European club scene". Ben-Yehuda also noted, "The set presents a more diverse range of musical styles, from bachata to R&B to even a poppy ballad ("Cuando")". The iTunes Notes for the album say, "True to its title, her seventh album is rich in melodrama, boasting grand synthesizer runs and heart-wrenching themes of love and betrayal. That's her strength. She's her own yin and yang-strong yet soft, swaggering yet tender." The Editor Notes for the album claimed Drama Queen to be an "adventurous set" and "full of sonic surprises".

== Track listing ==
- Standard Edition:

No.	Title	Writer(s)	Producer(s)	Length
1.	"Intro (Listen To My Drama)"	Martha Pesante, Hiram Cruz	Keko Musik	3:48
2.	"Te Voy A Recordar"	Pesante, Cruz	Keko Musik	3:36
3.	"Me Quiere"	Pesante, Cruz	Keko Musik	3:46
4.	"De La Calle" (featuring De La Ghetto)	Pesante, Vladmir Felix, Rafael Castillo	DJ Blass	5:05
5.	"Amor Puro"	Pesante, Cruz	Keko Musik	3:25
6.	"I Do"	Pesante, Jonathan Rivera, Giancarlo Rivera	Mad Music	3:37
7.	"Acércate" (featuring Wisin & Yandel)	Pesante, Marcos Masis, Juan Morera, Llandel Veguilla	Luny Tunes, Tainy	3:26
8.	"La Vida Es Así"	Pesante, Francisco Saldaña, Masis	Tainy	3:12
9.	"Cuando"	Pesante, Cruz	Keko Musik	3:40
10.	"Cosas De La Vida" (featuring Frank Reyes)	Pesante, Saldaña, Lenny Santos, Daniel Cruz, Frank Reyes	Lenny Santos, Luny Tunes	4:16
11.	"Cansada"	Pesante, Masis, Ramon Otero, Saldaña	Tainy	3:33
12.	"Jungle" (featuring Franco "El Gorila")	Pesante, Cruz, Luis Cortes	Keko Musik	3:10
13.	"La Vida Es Así" (Bachata Version)	Pesante, Saldaña, Masis	Luny Tunes, Tainy	3:31
Total length:				48:05

Deluxe Edition
No.	Title	Writer(s)	Producer(s)	Length
1.	"Intro (Listen To My Drama)"	Martha Pesante, Hiram Cruz	Keko Musik	3:48
2.	"Te Voy A Recordar"	Pesante, Cruz	Keko Musik	3:36
3.	"Aya Aya"	Pesante, Luis Febo, Francisco Saldaña	Luny Tunes	3:46
4.	"Me Quiere"	Pesante, Cruz	Keko Musik	3:25
5.	"De La Calle" (featuring De La Ghetto)	Pesante, Vladimir Felix, Rafael Castillo	DJ Blass	5:05
6.	"Amor Puro"	Pesante, Cruz	Keko Musik	3:37
7.	"I Do"	Pesante, Jonathan Rivera, Giancarlo Rivera	Mad Music	3:26
8.	"Acércate" (featuring Wisin & Yandel)	Pesante, Marcos Masis, Juan Morera, Llandel Veguilla	Luny Tunes, Tainy	3:12
9.	"La Vida Es Así"	Pesante, Saldaña, Masis	Tainy, Keko Mus	3:40
10.	"Amor A Primera Vista" (featuring Jadiel)	Pesante, Ramon Gonzalez, Miguel Marquez	Escobar	4:16
11.	"Cuando"	Pesante, Cruz	Keko Musik	3:33
12.	"Cosas De La Vida" (featuring Frank Reyes)	Pesante, Saldaña, Lenny Santos, Daniel Cruz, Frank Reyes	Keko Musik	3:10
13.	"Cansada"	Pesante, Masis, Saldaña, Ramon Otero	Tainy	3:31
14.	"Jungle" (featuring Franco "El Gorila")	Pesante, Cruz, Luis Cortes	Keko Musik	3:10
15.	"Dime"	Pesante, Urbani Cedeno, Alex Monserrate	Monserrate & DJ Urba	3:41
16.	"La Vida Es Así" (Bachata Version)	Pesante, Saldaña, Masis	Luny Tunes, Tainy	3:31
Total length:				59:32

iTunes Bonus Tracks
No.	Title	Writer(s)	Producer	Length
14.	"La Vida Es Así" (Keko Remix)	Martha Pesante, Francisco Saldaña, Marcos Masis	Keko Musik	2:56
Total length:				51:01

== Personnel ==
Standard edition

- Rafael Castillo – composer, vocals
- Jose Cotto – mixer
- Hiram Cruz – composer
- Patricai De León – model
- Vladimir Felix – composer
- Ariel Hernandez – hairdressing
- London Lumbi – wardrobe
- Mad Music – composer, producer
- Keko Musik – producer
- Marcos Masis – composer, producer
- Martha I. Pesante – composer, vocals, primary artist
- Ramon Luis Otero – composer
- Franco "El Gorila" – vocals
- Frank Reyes – composer, vocals
- Francisco Saldaña – composer, producer
- Lenny Santos – composer, producer
- Luis Francisco Cortes Torres – composer
- Wisin & Yandel – composer, vocals

Deluxe edition

- Urbani Mota Cedeno – composer, producer
- Luis Febo – composer
- Ramon Gonzolez – composer
- Miguel Marquez – composer
- Michael Monserrate – composer, producer
- Machete Music – record label

== Charts ==
=== Weekly charts ===
Chart (2010)	Peak position
US Billboard 200	163
US Top Latin Albums (Billboard)	3
US Top Rap Albums (Billboard)	18
US Top Current Albums (Billboard)	144
US Latin Rhythm Albums (Billboard)	1

=== Year-end charts ===
Chart (2010)	Position
US Latin Albums (Billboard)	60
US Latin Rhythm Albums (Billboard)	8
Chart (2011)	Position
US Latin Rhythm Albums (Billboard)	14

== Release history ==
List of release dates, showing region, formats and labels
Region	Standard edition	Deluxe edition
France	December 9, 2011	August 27, 2012
Germany	—N/a	August 27, 2012
Mexico	July 13, 2010	—N/a
United States	July 13, 2010	August 10, 2010
Worldwide	—N/a	January 9, 2026

== See also ==
- 2010 in Latin music
- List of number-one Billboard Latin Rhythm Albums of 2010
