= Machete Music Tour 2010 =

2010 concert tour by various artists

- National tour by Machete Music
- Promotional poster for the tour
- Location: U.S., North America
- Associated album: Various
- Start date: October 22, 2010
- End date: November 26, 2010
- No. of shows: 5 in North America

The Machete Music World Tour 2010 was an national tour by artists of the Latin Urban music label Machete Music. Headlined by Ivy Queen, and Tego Calderón, the tour also features Chino & Nacho, Flex, Jowell & Randy, Don Omar, Cosculluela, Angel & Khriz, J-King & Maximan and R.K.M & Ken-Y. The tour launched with a sold-out concert at the Theatre at Madison Square Garden in New York.

Originally to feature more than 15 dates, the tour was cut short to five dates due to unknown circumstances. Of the seven initial concerts, dates for Florida and others in Texas were cut from the five final concerts. Dates for a 2011 leg were announced but never fulfilled. Christopher Lopez of the Miami New Times expected a Miami date to be announced, being that Miami would be a major market for it.

== Background ==
Machete Music is an urban and reggaetón music label owned by Universal Music Group. Claiming 80% of Latin Rhythm Billboard chart sales, Machete has had 27 top ten albums on the Billboard Top Latin Albums chart with eleven of those being number one albums.

After the success of Ivy Queen's 2007 effort Sentimiento, which spawned the Top 10 hit "Que Lloren" and was later certified Platinum by the United States Recording Industry Association of America (RIAA), a substantial live album, Ivy Queen 2008 World Tour LIVE! was distributed by Machete in 2008. Subsequently, Queen signed a new record deal with the label in April 2010 as it celebrated its fifth anniversary. The tour was then launched later that year in celebration of the new artist and its fifth anniversary.

== Concert synopsis ==
=== Music ===
Opening acts for the tour included Don Omar, Ricky Rick, R.K.M & Ken-Y, among others. Songs performed by Don Omar include "Pobre Diabla", "Angelito", and "Vuele" from his debut studio album The Last Don. While Chino & Nacho usually follow. Songs they performed were "Mi Niña Bonita", "Tu Angelito", and Lo Que Tu Supieras". Following the Venezuelan duo, was Panamanian Flex who performed "Te Quiero", "Te Amo Tanto", "Dime Si Te Vas Con El" and "Besos De Amor".

Flex was dressed in a grey jacket and black hat with dark shades. Tego Calderón followed performing songs from his early discography. Closing the tour was usually handled by Ivy Queen who was dressed in a pink miniskirt sporting blonde hair with white boots which reached past her knees. Songs she performed included "Dime", "La Vida Es Así", "Que Lloren" and "Cosas De La Vida" which are featured on her most recent albums.

== Tour dates ==
| Date | City | Country | Venue |
|---|---|---|---|
North America
| October 22, 2010 | New York City | United States | Madison Square Garden |
| October 23, 2010 | Charlotte | United States | Bojangles' Coliseum |
| November 4, 2010 | El Paso | United States | El Paso Country Coliseum |
| November 5, 2010 | San Francisco | United States | The Warfield |
| November 6, 2010 | Los Angeles | United States | Nokia Theatre L.A. Live |

=== Cancellations and rescheduled shows ===
| October 15, 2010 | Orlando | United States | Amway Arena | Cancelled due to unknown circumstances |
| October 16, 2010 | Charlotte | United States | Bojangles' Coliseum | Rescheduled to October 23, 2010 |
| October 23, 2010 | Chicago | United States | Aragon Ballroom | Cancelled due to unknown circumstances |
| October 27, 2010 | Austin | United States | The Frank Erwin Center | Cancelled due to scheduling conflicts |
| October 28, 2010 | Houston | United States | Club Escapade | Cancelled due to unknown circumstances |
| October 29, 2010 | Grand Prairie | United States | Verizon Theatre at Grand Prairie | Cancelled due to unknown circumstances |
| November 7, 2010 | Los Angeles | United States | Nokia Theatre L.A. Live | Rescheduled to November 6, 2010 |
| November 8, 2010 | San Jose | United States | HP Pavilion at San Jose | Cancelled due to unknown circumstances |
