= Peligro de Extinción =

"Peligro De Extinción"

Single by Ivy Queen

from the album Musa
- Released: March 24, 2012 (Radio); June 19, 2012 (Digital)
- Recorded: 2011–2012
- Genre: Latin pop, reggaetón, vallenato, cumbia
- Length: 3:22
- Label: Siente Music
- Songwriters: Martha Pesante, Francisco Saldaña; Víctor Delgado
- Producers: Noriega, Predikador

Ivy Queen singles chronology
"Amor Puro" (2010)	"Peligro De Extinción" (2012)	"Vamos A Celebrar" (2012)

"Peligro De Extinción" (English: Danger Of Extinction) is a Latin pop song by Puerto Rican reggaetón recording artist Ivy Queen, from her eighth studio album, Musa (2012). It was composed by Queen, Francisco Saldaña, and Víctor Delgado, produced by Noriega alongside the help of Predikador and released as the lead single off the album on March 24, 2012. The recording gained mainly positive to mixed reviews from critics, many praising the use of Edison Rey's accordion in the song. Lyrically, the song talks about how she doesn't want to be in danger of extinction, and that if there are no Romeos to sing to Juliets that the Juliets will take the role of the Romeos.

The song is a mixture of reggaetón, cumbia, and vallenato to create a new type of Latin pop sound. It reached number eighteen on the Billboard Latin Rhythm Airplay chart and number twenty-one on the Billboard Latin Rhythm Digital Songs chart. The song also managed a week on the Billboard Tropical Songs chart, at number eighty-four. The song's accompanying music video was directed by Marlon Peña and filmed in Miami, Florida on August 18, 2012. It was released on September 28, 2012. Queen performed the song at the 2012 Los Angeles LGBT pride parade. The song was included at number thirty-eight on Tr3s' Top 100 of 2012.

== Background ==
After the success of her 2007 effort Sentimiento, which would be certified Platinum by the United States Recording Industry Association of America (RIAA), a substantial live album was distributed by Machete in 2008. This would lead up to Queen signing with the label in April 2010 as the label celebrated its fifth anniversary.

The record signing, described as a 360 deal, includes profit sharing in tours, sponsorships and merchandising. Ivy Queen was previously signed to a distribution deal with Univision Records, which in turn was acquired by Machete's parent company Universal Music Latin Entertainment in 2008. President of Universal Music Latino and Machete, Walter Kolm, commented in a press release "It's a privilege to have Ivy Queen a part of our artistic roster. Ivy is an extraordinary woman with incomparable talent, and she's number one in her genre. We're happy to be able to work with her on her new album as well as future projects". "I'm very proud to be a part of Machete Music. They are a young, vibrant company that has created a name for itself in Latin music in the United States and the world. They are a strong and important company that has been recognized for nurturing their artists’ creative talents," said Ivy Queen, regarding the partnership. However even with all this, it was reported that Queen had signed with Siente Music in early 2012.

== Writing and composition ==
Ivy Queen "Peligro De Extinción" (2012)
An 18-second sample of "Peligro De Extinción" featuring Edision Rey's accordion contributing to a reggaeton and cumbia type sound infused with vallenato.

Ivy Queen told Efe that the composition process started while she was heartbroken at home. Her emotions then burst out in the recording studio. She wrote 26 songs for Drama Queen in which only 16 appear, the lasting ten are used for Musa. She explained that "The expectations I have with this album are quite realistic and can not be other than success and this is due to something that I did not think was possible without technology and the Internet". She says the two years away from the media has helped her, not just emotionally but mentally as well. "I like it, I think it is the best way to separate Ivelisse and Ivy Queen". She indicated that the album is "very mature and complete," because even though "her style is urban and the most predominant themes of reggaeton it also features fusions of rhythms and instruments that make their own style." "I did not want to lock in to the reggaeton genre or singing just one genre. I had to address more than just one 'target' or a musical style as such. I love music in general and this, when the album was born of my loins; I let the muse flow and there came my ten issues." "Peligro De Extinción" was composed by Queen herself with the help of Víctor Delgado and one half of the Dominican reggaetón production duo Luny Tunes, Francisco Saldaña, known as Luny. The song blends reggaetón with the sounds of cumbia and vallenato. The song is composed in major key tonality and features simple harmonic progressions, an acoustic guitar, accordion (or bandoneon) playing, prominent percussion and romantic lyrics according to the Music Genome Project.

== Release and chart performance ==
The song was released to Puerto Rico radio stations on March 24, 2012, and premiered that same day on La Nueva 94.FM during the radio show "El Coyote The Show". It was released digitally on June 19, 2012 in the United States and on June 26, 2012 in Spain and Germany. On the Billboard Latin Rhythm Airplay chart, the song debuted at number twenty-one for the week of June 26, 2012. It peaked at number eighteen spending a total of sixteen weeks on the chart. On the Billboard Latin Rhythm Digital Songs chart, the song debuted and peaked at number twenty-one for the issue date of July 7, 2012, becoming Queen's third single on that chart after "La Vida Es Así" and "Acércate" reached number two and number sixteen respectively. On the issue date of November 24, 2012, the song debuted and peaked at number eighty-four on the Billboard Tropical Songs chart.

== Critical reception ==
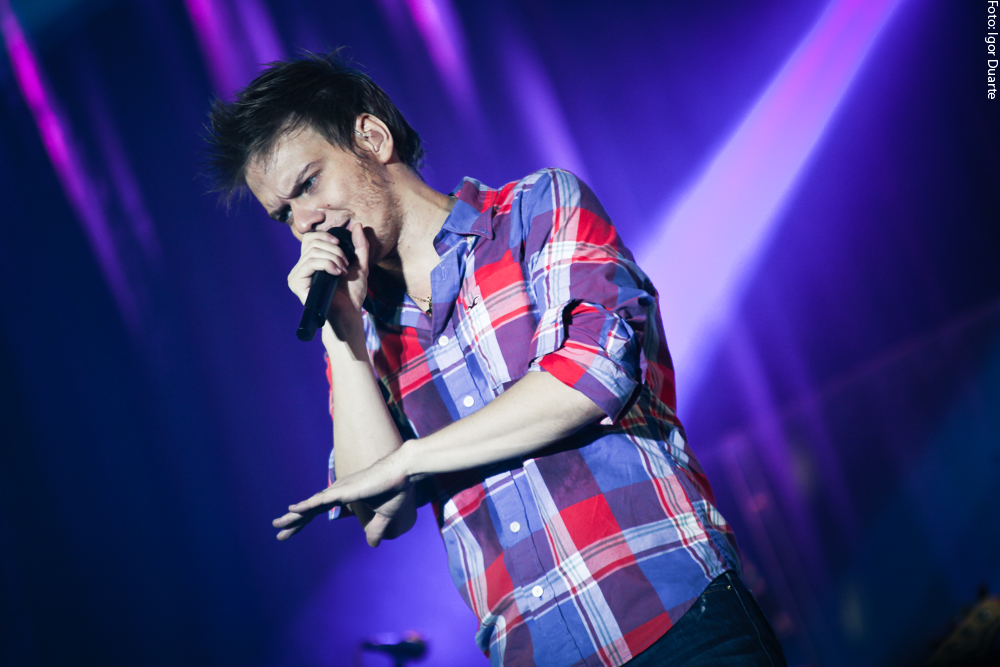
"Peligro De Extinción" has been compared to Michel Teló's smash hit "Ai Se Eu Te Pego!" saying that the use of the accordion was similar to that of "Ai Se Eu Te Pego".

The single garnered mostly positive to mixed reviews. On the review for the album, Rachel Devitt of Rhapsody commented, "See booming single "Peligro de Extinción," which seems pretty unlikely, especially when the Queen starts talking about Juliets taking over for Romeos if the boys can't handle it." Judy Cantor-Navas of Google Play commented that "Peligro de Extinción" features the kind of rootsy accordion found on Michel Teló's worldwide sensation "Ai Se Eu Te Pego." According to David Jeffries of Allmusic, the "more polished "Peligro de Extinción" is worth inclusion on her next best-of album. Thom Jurek, also writing for Allmusic, selected the song as a standout track on the compilation album Ultrasónico 2013 (2013). Jonathan Bogart gave the song a 9 out of 10 stars and said "It took me a while to warm up to “Peligro de Extinción.” With that title, I'd been expecting a reggaetón rager excoriating the systems of oppression and erasure that threaten Puerto Ricans and Latinos everywhere. But what's in danger of extinction is “true romance,” “like in the days of old.” So rather than wait around for a Romeo to find her on her balcony, she's taking the reins and chasing him down herself — which is itself quietly revolutionary, that even in the middle of an old-fashioned love song lamenting the death of old-fashioned love, she's demanding agency. And Edison Rey's sweet accordion skillfully threads between the twin romanticisms at the far ends of Latin America, tango and conjunto norteño. It's perhaps the prettiest single Ivy Queen has ever released (or at least tied with “Dime”), largely letting the reggaetón beat alone in favor of lighter, more swaying cumbia and vallenato. And so what once passed in one ear and out the other when it first leaked back in May now moves me to tears. Of laughter, when she gives the guy that look in the video, and of sentiment, when the harmonies come lushly in." Anthony Easton gave the song a 7 out of 10 stars and said "The accordion is just gorgeous, plus I have always loved Ivy Queen’s voice. In fact, all of this slowed down and stretched out, with less gymnastics required, we have more time to work through what the voice means, and how it sounds — that privilege attached to the accordion just makes it better." Edward Okulicz gave the single a 7 out of 10 stars and said "Well, you’ve got to love the sound of an accordion in its natural environment; Ivy Queen sings with a real, impressive sense of authority, nearly as regal as the name would imply. That authority and presence is undermined slightly by the beat which drown them out to some extent, though if it were quieter it wouldn’t encourage the hips so much. The trade-off wouldn’t have been worth it." Will Adams gave the song a 4 out of 10 stars and commented that his first and only exposure to Ivy Queen was through a funny video. He would go on to say he was expecting something fun. "The music is bright enough to inspire early-hours dancing, but the unfamiliar structure and minor key leaning take away some of the fun." Iain Forrester gave the song a 7 out of 10 stars and said that the opening line “That was then. This is now” was an excellent portentous opening. He would go on to say that the song doesn't end up sounding like the definitive statement that it promises, hanging back too far from embracing dance banger status. The gorgeous squeaky flutter of the accordion is a strong compensation. Josh Langhoff gave the song a 7 out of 10 stars and said "To say a reggaetón song inhabits multiple musical worlds at once is to say precisely nothing, since “blending”, “taking influences” and “Spanish reggae” have always been part of the point. So instead I'll say, man, that accordion solo halfway through sounds like a guitar solo — a single line, triplets, repetitive melodic figures stretching for the notes with maximum yearn impact. Tasty! The notes yearn because of how they fit the chord progression, imported from a million norteamericano pop songs; on top of it, Ms. Queen and her producers build an elaborate vocal structure of multitracked harmonies and shoutouts, even evoking Nelly-style rapstimme at the beginning. Every element seems chosen to sound cool, which is a nice thing about inhabiting multiple musical worlds — you can avoid the tensions you'd find in a Junot Diaz book or, you know, real life."

== Music video ==
Ivy Queen and her "Romeo" in the music video for "Peligro De Extinción".

The music video for "Peligro De Extinción" was filmed in Miami, Florida on August 18, 2012. It was directed by Marlon Pena. It was released on September 28, 2012. The video has over three million views on the video-sharing website YouTube.

== Track listing ==
No.	Title	Writer(s)	Producer(s)	Length
1.	"Peligro De Extinción"	Martha Pesante, Francisco Saldaña, Víctor Delgado	Noriega, Predikador	3:22
Total length:				3:22

== Charts ==
=== Weekly charts ===
Chart (2012)	Position
US Latin Rhythm Airplay (Billboard)	18
US Latin Rhythm Digital Songs (Billboard)	17
US Tropical Songs (Billboard)	84

=== Yearly charts ===
Chart (2012)	Position
US Latin Rhythm Airplay (Billboard)	47

== Release history ==
List of release dates, showing regions, formats, labels and references
Region	Date	Format	Label
Puerto Rico	March 24, 2012	Radio premiere	Siente Music, Venevision
United States	June 19, 2012	Digital download, streaming	Siente Music, Venevision
Spain	June 26, 2012	Digital download, streaming	Universal Music Spain
Germany	June 26, 2012	Digital download, streaming	Universal Music International
