= St. Bernard de Clairvaux Church =

- Old Spanish Monastery
- U.S. National Register of Historic Places
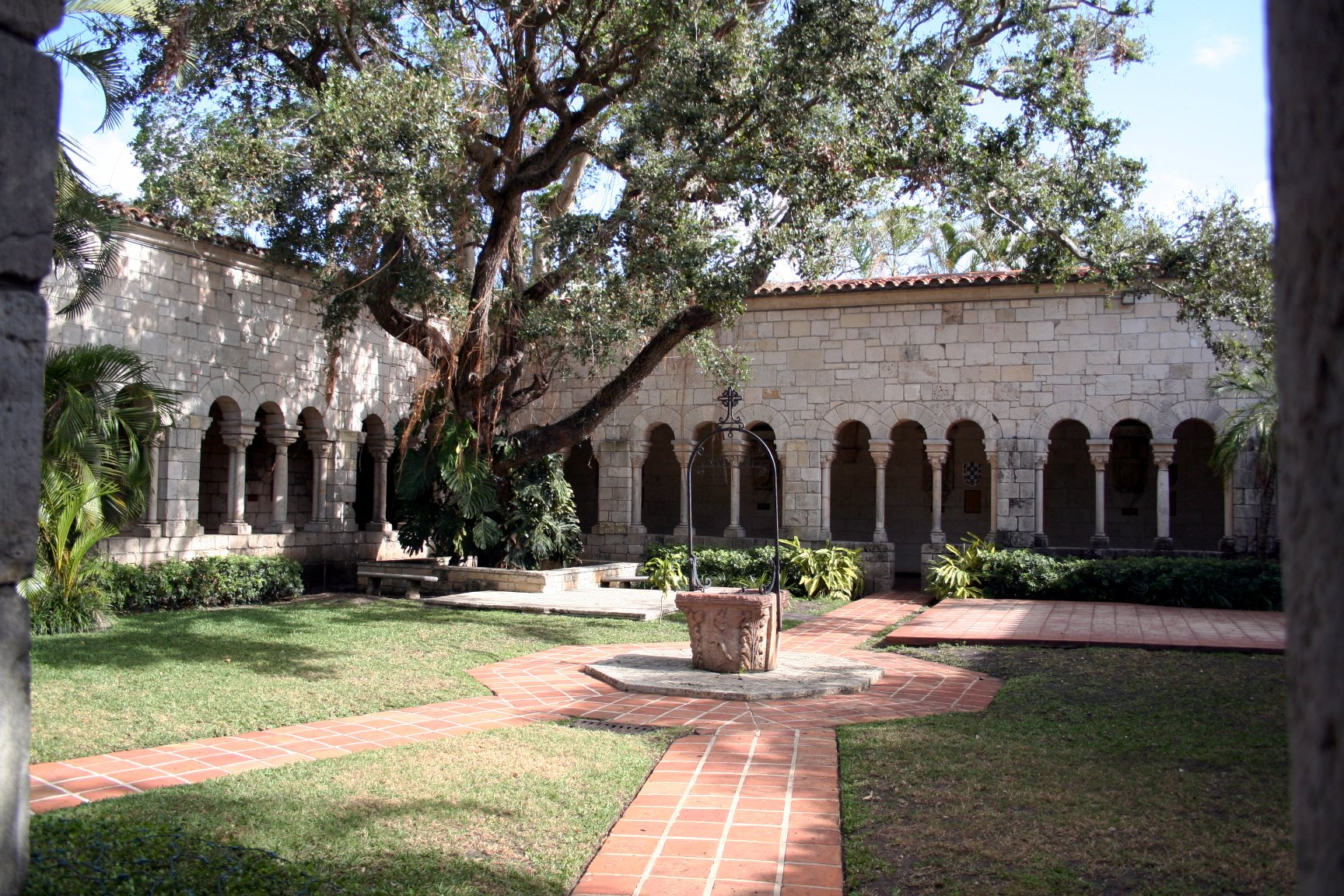
- Central courtyard surrounded by the cloisters

- Location within Miami Location within Florida Location within the United States
- Location: North Miami Beach, Florida, United States
- Coordinates: 25°55′45″N 80°9′17″W
- Built: 1133–1141
- Architectural style: Romanesque
- NRHP reference No.: 72000307
- Added to NRHP: November 9, 1972

St. Bernard de Clairvaux Church (Spanish: Monasterio Español de Sacramenia) is a medieval Spanish monastery cloister which was built in the town of Sacramenia in Segovia, Spain, in the 12th century but dismantled in the 20th century and shipped to New York City in the United States. It was eventually reassembled at 16711 West Dixie Highway, North Miami Beach, Florida, where it is now an Episcopal church and tourist attraction called Ancient Spanish Monastery.

== History from 1133–1926 ==
The Cistercian monastery was constructed during the years 1133–1141. It was originally named "Monastery of Our Lady, Queen of the Angels", or the "Royal Monastery of Saint Mary" (Spanish: Santa María la Real), but it was renamed to honor Bernard of Clairvaux (in Spanish San Bernardo de Claraval) upon his canonization. Use of the building as a Cistercian monastery lasted for almost 700 years until it was seized and sold off to be used as a granary and a stable during a period of social unrest in the 1830s.

It was located in an area known as Coto de San Bernardo (St. Bernard land preserve), two miles from Sacramenia in the province of Segovia (Spain). The Monasterio was in a mountain region at 830 m above sea level, on a high plateau near the Sierra de Guadarrama, the region is known for extreme weather. The area has medieval churches, chapels, monasteries, walls, castles, within the natural landscape of the Duratón River Gorges. The traditional access to the monastery was an ancient path with the masonry ruins of a watermill. The monastery was constructed with necessary defensive strength among a web of minor fortresses in an area heavily populated by Muslims.

The monastery was founded by Alfonso VII of Castile and León and built in the traditional style of Cistercian Romanesque architecture in Spain. Alfonso VII had introduced the Cistercians monasteries into Spain and after the monastery's completion, he settled in place Cistercian monks who had come from France. Alfonso VII, and afterward his grandson Alfonso VIII of Castile, extended privileges to the monastery several times in order to exempt rights of way tax for people and goods, and grant freedom of movement for their grazing flocks.

The Christian conquests and reconquests were followed by migrations of Muslims for religious reasons that could cause the depopulation of entire areas. Muslims had populated the surviving cities that had been founded during the Roman Empire and Visigothic civilization. The area of Segovia had a large Muslim population which resisted the Christian reconquest several times after attempts at cultural assimilation. The newly founded monasteries served, among other things, as centers of evangelization and colonization. Abundant irrigation systems, canals, ditches, and castles had already been constructed during the Muslim era. The Muslim people established their cities on the banks of rivers, because their economy was based on agriculture, concentrating on the cultivation of irrigated land. Some areas of the Pyrenees had not been effectively occupied because of the high altitude, but the traffic of people and goods was controlled by establishing fortified steps at the entrance to the valleys.

Because of Muslim occupation, the nobles and Christian clergy had settled mostly in the north of present-day Spain, then small independent Christian kingdoms. There they began to organize churches and monasteries around which the Christian communities soon developed. Religious communities revived trade among other Iberian towns especially in wool and salt, also the cultivation of vines and raising of livestock. Differences between newly arrived monks and earlier residents of the area caused altercations concerning the passage of merchant mule caravans, the exploitation of salt, water use in the region's villages, dominion over the towns, pastures, and tithes.

Some parts of the monastery were rebuilt after being destroyed by fire in 1641. The abbey remained an active monastic community until 1835. The monastery was closed about 1836-1840 during Isabella II of Spain's rule as a consequence of the Ecclesiastical Confiscations of Mendizábal. The Desamortización caused the exclaustration of the place, brought monastic life to an end and the main church was privatized. Its Romanesque abbey church remains one of the monuments of Sacramenia.

== History 1926–64 ==
The historic monastery building is for the most part in the United States, that is, the cloister, the chapter house and the refectory of the monks. The rest of the monastic compound, that is, the church and other facilities such as Cilla (mullion) remain privately owned in Spain, in Sacramenia village, although the grounds can be visited on certain days. It was declared a Spanish national monument on June 3, 1931.

The monastery's cloister and its outbuildings were illegally purchased and moved by William Randolph Hearst in 1926, despite Spanish government restrictions. In order to be transported to the United States, the structures were carefully dismantled, each piece was numbered and packaged in wooden crates lined with hay. The total shipment comprised 11,000 crates. However, some of the information contained in this labeling process was lost when the shipment was quarantined in the USA because of a break-out of hoof and mouth disease in Segovia. During the quarantine, the crates were opened and the hay filling was burned as a measure to prevent the spread of the disease. During the repackaging, the contents of the crates were not replaced correctly. William Randolph Hearst was ultimately unable to pursue his plan of rebuilding the monastery at San Simeon because of financial difficulties. The dismantled buildings were stored in a warehouse in Brooklyn, New York until they were purchased in 1952 by Raymond Moss and William Edgemon, who eventually reassembled them on the site of a small plant nursery in northern Miami There the religious buildings became a tourist attraction known as the Ancient Spanish Monastery.

Raymond Moss and William Edgemon took charge of the reconstruction of the historic building in 1964. They added other decorative pieces from different Spanish buildings to the original complex, such as the large round carved-stone coat of arms seen in the cloister. The coat of arms originally belonged to the House of Alburquerque and came from the monastery of San Francisco de Cuellar, also in the province of Segovia. The chapel was erected in the 15th century by Beltrán de la Cueva, 1st Duke of Alburquerque, favorite of Henry IV of Castile and the first Duke of Alburquerque to be earmarked for the family vaults, which were also sold in the 20th century after the secularization of the monastery. Reassembling the ancient monastic buildings took 19 months and cost almost 1.5 million dollars. Some of the original stones remained unused in the process.

== History 1964–date ==
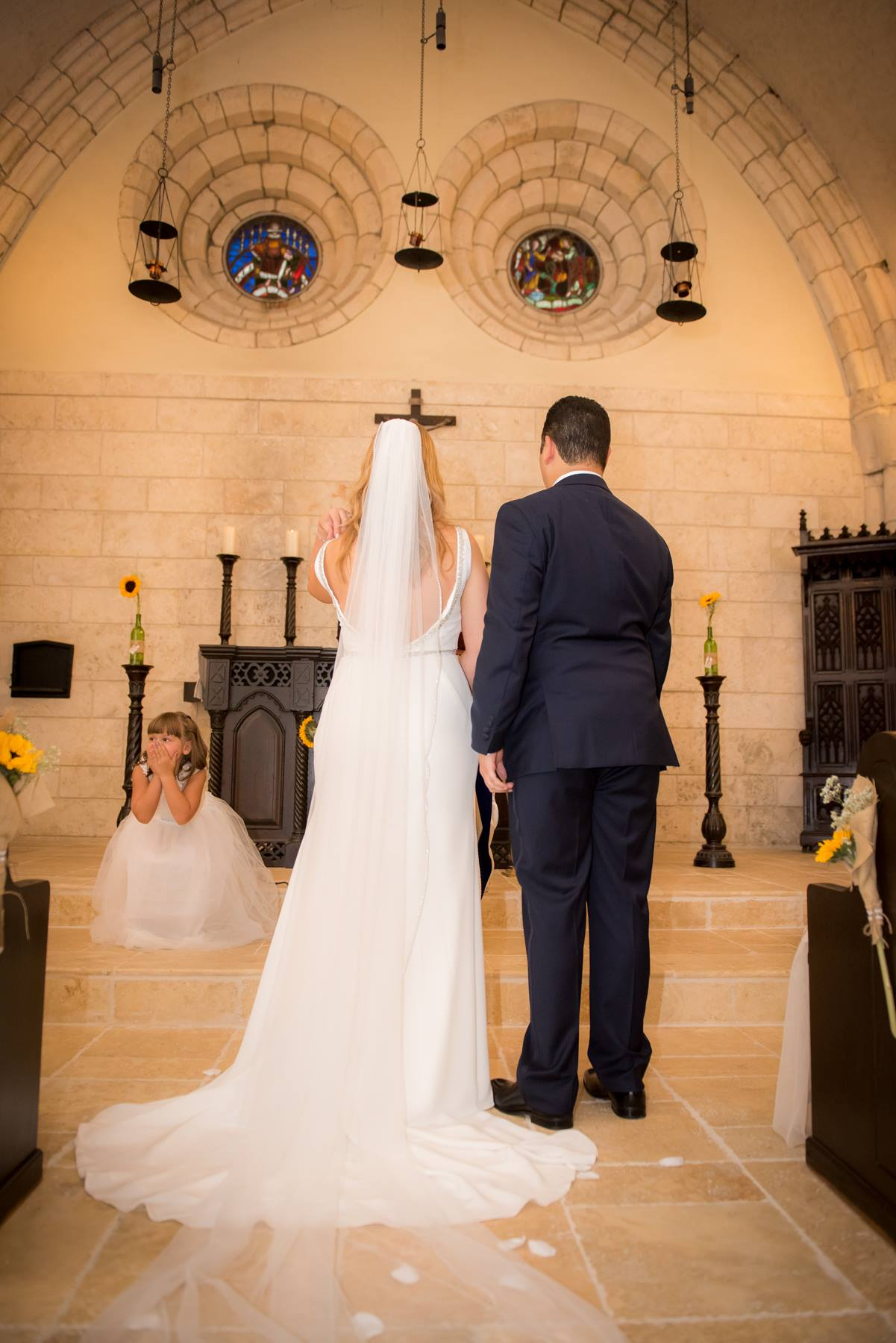
Wedding in the St. Bernard de Clairvaux Church.

The property was purchased by Bishop Henry I. Louttit in 1964 for the Episcopal Diocese of South Florida, which was later split into the Dioceses of Central, Southeast and Southwest Florida. Eventually financial difficulties forced the three dioceses to sell the monastery, it was purchased by Colonel Robert Pentland Jr., who gave it to the Episcopal parish of St. Bernard de Clairvaux. Three doors from the monastery are now in a private home in Atlanta, Georgia.

== Gallery ==
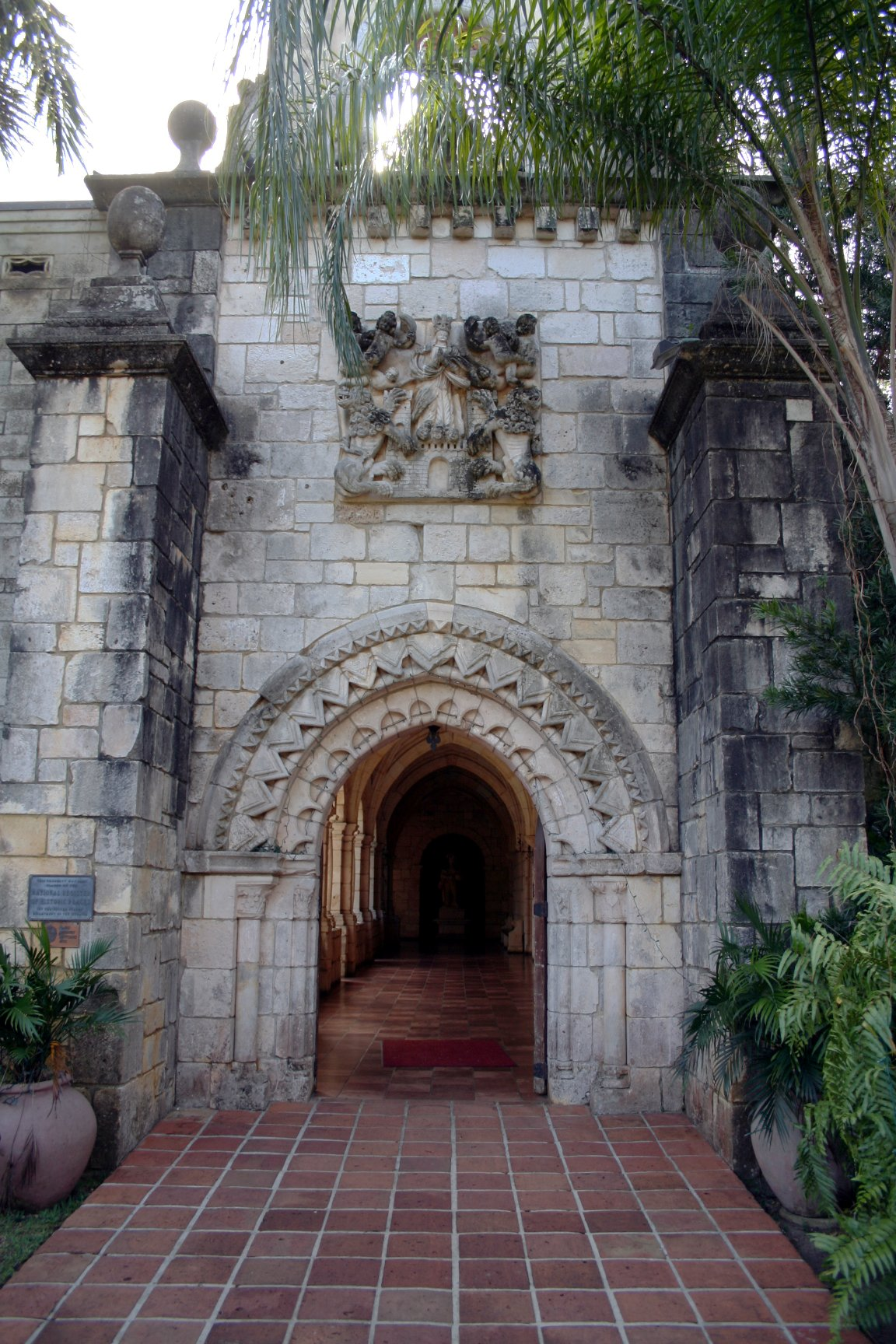
Entrance to the cloisters.

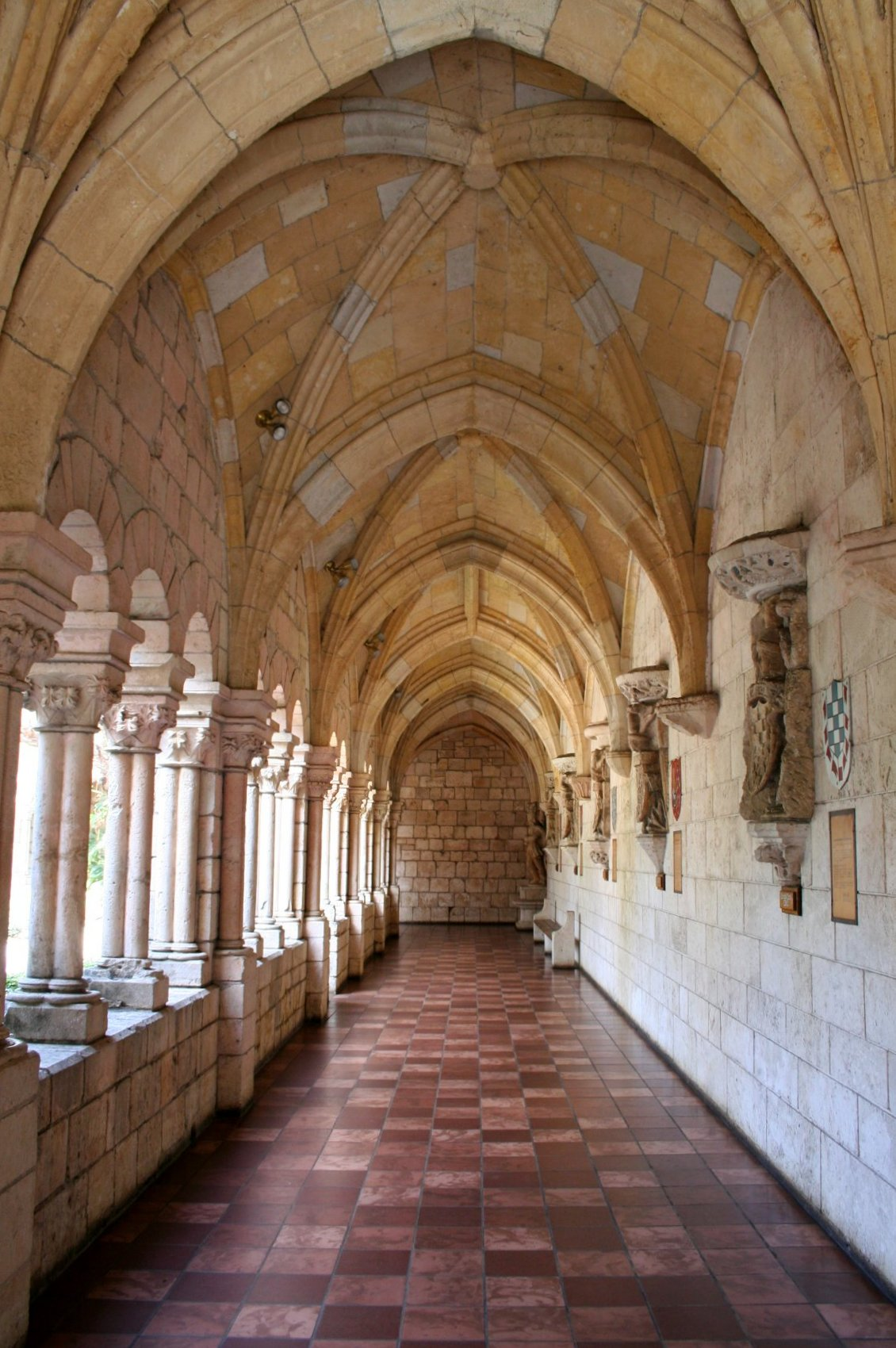
View inside the cloisters.

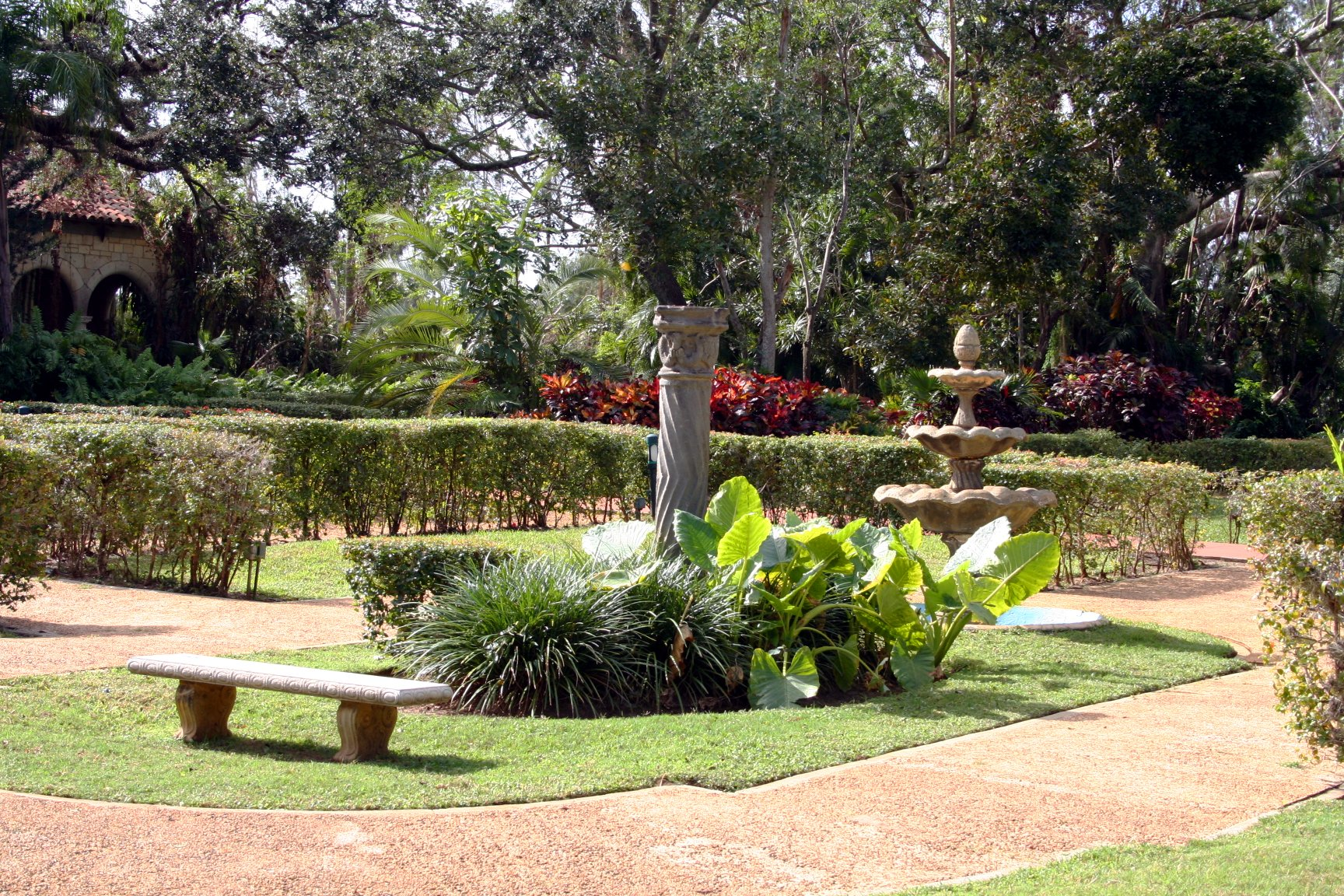
Gardens surrounding the building.
