= Acércate =

2010 song performed by Wisin & Yandel, Ivy Queen

Song by Ivy Queen featuring Wisin & Yandel

from the album Drama Queen
- Released: July 13, 2010
- Recorded: 2009–10
- Studio: Mas Flow Studios (Carolina, Puerto Rico)
- Genre: Reggaetón
- Length: 3:28
- Label: Machete, Drama, WY
- Songwriters: Martha Pesante, Juan Morena, Llandel Veguilla, Marcos Masis
- Producers: Luny Tunes, Tainy

"Acércate" (English: "Come Closer") is a song recorded by Puerto Rican reggaetón recording artist Ivy Queen and duo Wisin & Yandel for Queen's seventh studio album Drama Queen (2010). It was composed by Queen and Marcos Masis alongside the duo, while being produced by Luny Tunes and Tainy. Originally entitled "No Te Equivoques", the song was leaked onto the Internet prior to the album's release, which prompted Ivy Queen and Wisin & Yandel to re-record the song.

While failing to chart on main Latin songs charts in Billboard magazine, it did manage to debut and peak at number sixteen on the Billboard Latin Rhythm Digital Songs chart, charting simultaneously with the lead single off the album "La Vida Es Así" which obtained the number two position. The song brings together the first studio album released by Ivy Queen in three years and first for Machete Music, after being with Univision Records since 2005.

== Background ==
After the success of her 2007 effort Sentimiento, which was certified Platinum by the United States Recording Industry Association of America (RIAA), a substantial live album was distributed by Machete in 2008. Subsequently, Queen signed a new record deal with the label in April 2010, as they celebrated their fifth anniversary. The signing, described as a 360 deal, includes profit sharing in tours, sponsorships and merchandising. Ivy Queen was previously signed to a distribution deal with Univision Records, which in turn was acquired by Machete's parent company Universal Music Latin Entertainment in 2008.

President of Universal Music Latino and Machete, Walter Kolm, commented in a press release that: "It's a privilege to have Ivy Queen a part of oour artistic roster. Ivy is an extraordinary woman with incomparable talent, and she's number one in her genre. We're happy to be able to work with her on her new album as well as future projects". "I'm very proud to be a part of Machete Music. They are a young, vibrant company that has created a name for itself in Latin music in the United States and the world. They are a strong and important company that has been recognized for nurturing their artists’ creative talents," said Ivy Queen, regarding the partnership. Ivy Queen told Efe that the composition process started while she was heartbroken at home. Her emotions then burst out in the recording studio. She added the song is one of 26 songs she wrote during this period.

== Music and lyrics ==
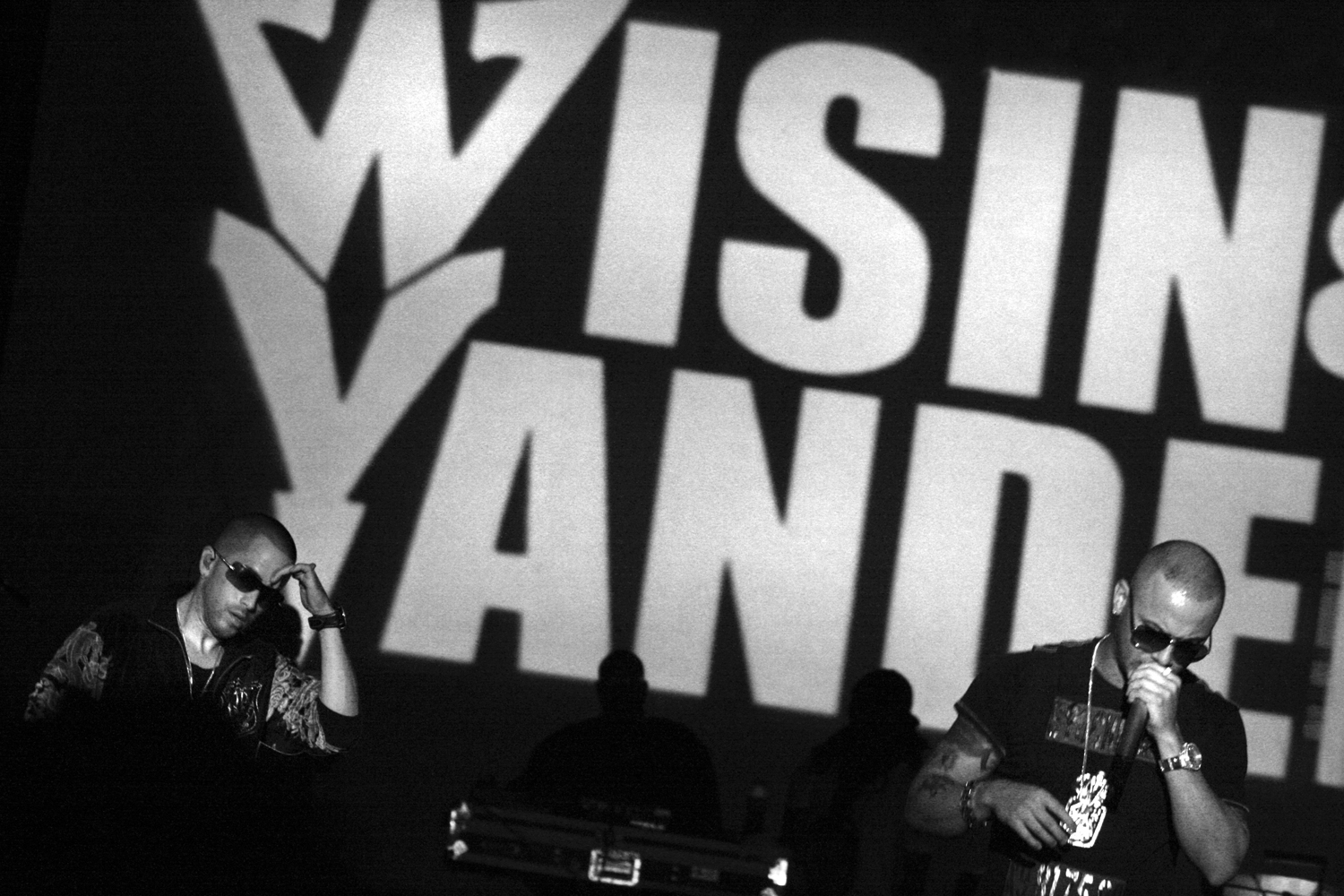
Wisin & Yandel collaborated on the song with Ivy Queen and Marcos Masis.

The song was composed by Queen, Marcos Masis, Juan Luis Morera Luna and Llandel Veguilla Malavé; the duo known as Wisin & Yandel. Musically, it features minor key tonality and synthesizers. Production was handled by the Dominican-born duo of Luny Tunes and Tainy. Frances Tirado from Primera Hora described the song as being pure reggaeton and as a song that brings out the figure in Ivy Queen. "Acércate", along with the rest of the album, was recorded at Mas Flow Studios in Carolina, Puerto Rico. A version with lead male vocals by Wisin & Yandel without lead vocals from Ivy Queen remains unreleased, with a running time of two minutes and fifty-three seconds. It too was produced by Luny Tunes and Tainy.

"Acércate" was leaked onto the Internet prior to the album's release; a first in Queen's 15-year career. Originally entitled "No Te Equivoques", it was re-recorded in response to the infringement and included on the album retitled "Acércate". Reflecting on the situation Queen stated: "Sometimes they try to hurt you are when you do well. I'm proud and grateful that Wisin & Yandel have gone with me to the studio to record the song. We have good chemistry and friendship. We tried to change the song and lyrics, but with their agenda, which is tight, and mine too, we could not do it again. We have no idea who hacked, all the music was in a studio and to mobilize it to another was what someone did." The collaboration stemmed from Queen's previous collaboration with Wisin & Yandel on their seventh studio album La Revolución (2009) on "Perfecto" which also featured Yaviah.

== Credits and personnel ==
- Credits adapted from Allmusic

Recording

- Recorded at Mas Flow Studios in Carolina, Puerto Rico

Personnel

- José Cotto — Mixing
- Ivy Queen — Primary Artist, Composer
- Marcos "Tainy" Masis — Composer, Producer
- Francisco Saldaña — Composer
- Luny Tunes — Producer
- Wisin & Yandel — Composers, Featured Artist

== Chart performance ==
While failing to chart on main Latin songs charts in Billboard magazine, it did manage to debut and peak at number sixteen on the Billboard Latin Rhythm Digital Songs chart, for the week of July 31, 2010. It charted simultaneously with the lead single "La Vida Es Así", which was at number two on the chart.

Chart (2010)	Peak Position
US Latin Rhythm Digital Songs (Billboard)	16
