= Sacramenia =

- Municipality
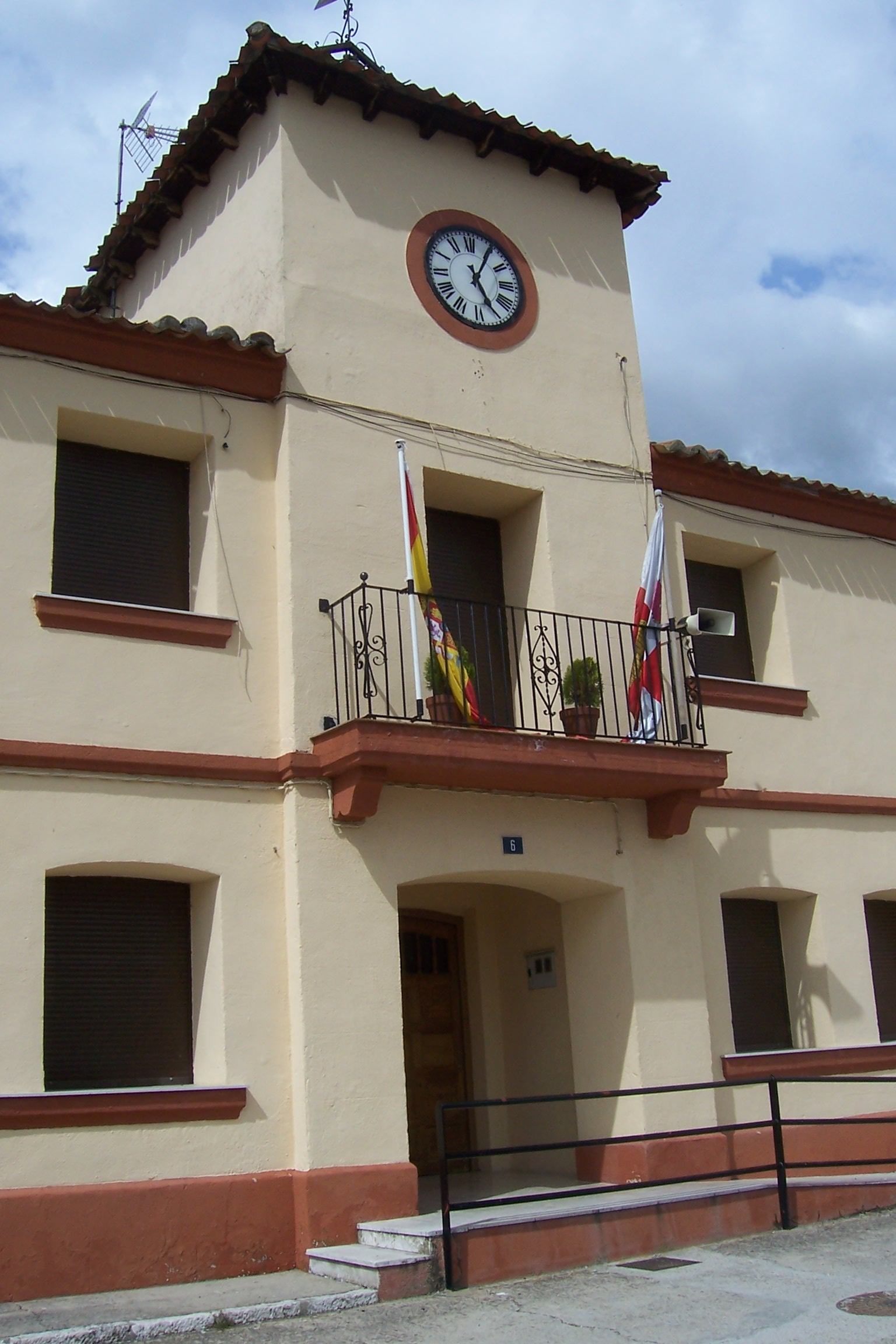
- Sacramenia Town hall.

- Location in Spain. Sacramenia (Spain)
- Coordinates: 41°29′41″N 3°57′48″W
- Country: Spain
- Autonomous community: Castile and León
- Province: Segovia
- Municipality: Sacramenia

Area
  - Total: 44 km^{2} (17 sq mi)

Population (2025-01-01)
  - Total: 324
  - Density: 7.4/km^{2} (19/sq mi)
- Time zone: UTC+1 (CET)
  - Summer (DST): UTC+2 (CEST)
- Website: Official website

Sacramenia is a municipality located in the province of Segovia, Castile and León, Spain. According to the 2004 census (INE), the municipality has a population of 540 inhabitants.

The 12th century St. Bernard de Clairvaux Church was located in Segovia and remained until being moved to North Miami Beach, Florida, U.S. in the 1950s.
