= La Vida es Así =

2010 single by Ivy Queen

"La Vida Es Así"

Single by Ivy Queen

from the album Drama Queen
- Released: May 11, 2010
- Recorded: 2009–2010; Mas Flow Studios (Carolina, Puerto Rico)
- Genre: Reggaetón
- Length: 3:12
- Label: Machete Music
- Songwriters: Martha Pesante, Francisco Saldaña, Marcos Masis
- Producers: Luny Tunes, Tainy

Ivy Queen singles chronology
"Dime" (2008)	"La Vida Es Así" (2010)	"Amor Puro" (2010)

"La Vida Es Así" (English: Life Is Like That) is a song by Puerto Rican reggaetón singer-songwriter Ivy Queen. It was written by Queen, Francisco Saldaña and Marcos Masis, produced by Tainy and released as the lead single off her seventh studio album, Drama Queen (2010) on May 11, 2010.

The song was serviced to Latin radio in both Urban and Tropical formats. The reggaeton version of "La Vida Es Así" was a success on the Billboard Latin charts. The song's accompanying music video was shot on May 17, 2010 in Miami and premiered on mun2 on June 22, 2010 and VEVO on June 28, 2010 and was directed by Marlon Peña. The video has over 100 million views on YouTube.

In 2022, the song was re-recorded into bachata for Arthur Hanlon's album Piano & Mujer, Vol. 2.

== Background ==
After the success of her 2007 effort Sentimiento, which would be certified Platinum by the United States Recording Industry Association of America (RIAA), a substantial live album was distributed by Machete in 2008. This would lead up to Queen signing with the label in April 2010 as the label celebrated its fifth anniversary. The signing, described as a 360 deal, includes profit sharing in tours, sponsorships and merchandising. Ivy Queen was previously signed to a distribution deal with Univision Records, which in turn was acquired by Machete's parent company Universal Music Latin Entertainment in 2008. President of Universal Music Latino and Machete, Walter Kolm, commented in a press release "It's a privilege to have Ivy Queen a part of our artistic roster. Ivy is an extraordinary woman with incomparable talent, and she's number one in her genre. We're happy to be able to work with her on her new album as well as future projects". "I'm very proud to be a part of Machete Music. They are a young, vibrant company that has created a name for itself in Latin music in the United States and the world. They are a strong and important company that has been recognized for nurturing their artists’ creative talents," said Ivy Queen, regarding the partnership. Ivy Queen told Efe that the composition process started while she was heartbroken at home. Her emotions then burst out in the recording studio. She added the song is one of 26 songs she wrote during this period.

== Composition ==
Ivy Queen "La Vida Es Así" – Video Version (2010)
A 21-second sample of the video version of the lead single "La Vida Es Así" which appears as a bonus track on the Deluxe Edition of Drama Queen.

"La Vida Es Así" was written by Queen, along with Francisco Saldaña and Marcos Masis. The song features vocal effects, minor key tonality and synthesizers. The urban version attacks with a modern and aggressive beat, while the bachata version slows with tropical rhythms by Luny Tunes. In the lyrics, Ivy Queen declares to a rival "The guy you're dating is mine, and you know it, but here's the detail: He's worthless in bed. That's why I'm here to congratulate you for setting me free, I have to confess." The reggaeton rhymes depict how life is while telling a story of revenge and love sickness. Angie Romero of Latina Magazine describes the song as being a "powerful and pulsating break-up anthem." Recording for "La Vida Es Así" and the rest of Drama Queen took place at Mas Flow Studios, in Carolina, Puerto Rico, owned by Luny Tunes. The reggaeton version was produced by Tainy, who also produced "Acércate" off of Drama Queen. The bachata version was produced by Tainy and Luny Tunes who also co-produced "Acércate". Queen has worked with Luny Tunes previously before, with Luny Tunes producing many of her biggest hits such as "Te He Querido, Te He Llorado".

== Release and chart performance ==
"La Vida Es Así" was released in both urban and bachata versions on May 11, 2010 by Machete Music. The bachata version was released on June 22, 2010. The reggaeton version became a success on the Billboard Latin charts, while the bachata version failed to acquire any chart success. On the Billboard Hot Latin Songs chart, the song debuted at number forty-nine on the week of June 6, 2010 and peaked at number eleven on the week of August 21, 2010. Aventura’s "El Malo" withheld the song from entering the top ten of the chart. On the Billboard Latin Pop Airplay chart, the song debuted at number thirty-three on the week of July 3, 2010 and peaked at number ten on the week of August 28, 2010. On the Billboard Latin Rhythm Airplay chart, the song debuted at number twenty-nine on the week of May 22, 2010. The following week, the single catapulted 29-7, enjoying a 1.8 million audience impression, up 154% from the previous week. It reached number one for the week of July 10, 2010, becoming her second number-one single, replacing "Cuando Me Enamoro" by Enrique Iglesias featuring Juan Luis Guerra and was later succeeded by "Cuando Me Enamoro" a week later. It was the sixteenth most played song on Miami's La Kalle 106.7FM in 2010.

== Reception ==
Simone Wilson, writing for LA Weekly, listed the song as one of the best reggaeton songs of the past half-decade (2006–2011).

== Track listing ==
No.	Title	Writer(s)	Producer(s)	Length
1.	"La Vida Es Así" (Album version)	Martha Pesante, Francisco Saldaña, Marcos Masis	Tainy	3:12
2.	"La Vida Es Así" (Bachata version)	Pesante, Saldaña, Masis	Luny Tunes, Tainy	3:32
3.	"La Vida Es Así" (Pre-order version)	Pesante, Saldaña, Masis	Keko Musik	2:59
Total length:				9:43

== Charts ==
=== Weekly charts ===
Chart (2010)	Position
US Latin Songs (Billboard)	11
US Latin Digital Songs (Billboard)	11
US Latin Pop Songs (Billboard)	10
US Tropical Songs (Billboard)	7
US Latin Recurrent Airplay (Billboard)	6
US Latin Rhythm Digital Songs (Billboard)	2
US Latin Rhythm Songs (Billboard)	1

=== Year-end charts ===
Chart (2010)	Position
US Latin Songs (Billboard)	37
US Latin Digital Songs (Billboard)	49
US Tropical Songs (Billboard)	23
US Latin Rhythm Digital Songs (Billboard)	18
US Latin Rhythm Airplay (Billboard)	4

== 2022 re-recording ==
"La Vida es Así"

Song by Arthur Hanlon and Ivy Queen

from the album Piano y Mujer II
- Released: November 25, 2022
- Recorded: 2022
- Genre: Bachata
- Length: 3:45
- Label: Sony Latin
- Songwriters: Martha Pesante, Francisco Saldaña, Marcos Masis
- Producers: Arthur Hanlon, Eddie Perez, Pinto Picasso, Jean Rodriguez

In 2022, Queen recorded a rendition of the song for Arthur Hanlon's album Piano y Mujer II. A recording of Rocio Durcal's hit, "Ya Te Olvide," along with an outro jam, entitled "We Are Going to Make It Tonight" with Catalina García, Ha-Ash, Lupita Infante and Debi Nova were also recorded and included on the album, which was released on November 23, 2022.

The three songs formed part of Hanlon's second HBO concert special, 'Piano y Mujer', produced by Loud and Live and Sony, which debuted November 29, 2022 on HBO Max in the United States and Latin America. According to Hanlon, "A piano and a female voice are the ideal combination." He revealed that during the recording process for the first installment in the series, they were "looking to make beautiful, meaningful music, especially in the middle of the pandemic."

=== Credits ===
Credits are adapted from Apple Music.

Performing Artists

- Arthur Hanlon — Piano
- Ivy Queen — performer
- Dan Needham — drums
- David Vazquez — bass
- Sergio Cavalieri — guitar
- Camilo Velandia — guitar
- Eddie Perez — keyboards
- Kelvin Santos — güiro
- Willie Smith — organ
- John Calzavara — guitar
- Pat Seymour — tenor saxophone
- Cisco Dimas — trumpet
- Miles Fiedler — trombone
- Ray Díaz — percussion
- Steven Cruz — guitar
- Lala Nascimiento — background vocals
- Pinto Picasso — background vocals
- Jason Edmunds — background vocals
- Aliethia Evcans — background vocals
- Tayanna Monestime — background vocals

Composition and lyrics

- Martha Pesante — composer
- Francisco Saldana — composer
- Marco Masis — composer
- Pat Seymour — arranging

Production and engineering

- Arthur Hanlon — producer
- Eddie Perez — producer, mixing engineer, recording engineer
- Pinto Picasso — vocal producer, recording engineer
- Jean Rodgriguez — recording engineer, vocal producer
- Andrei Fossari — mastering engineer

== See also ==
- List of Billboard Latin Rhythm Airplay number ones of 2010
