= Luny Tunes production discography =

Luny Tunes are a two-part producing group featuring Francisco Saldaña (Luny) and Víctor Cabrera (Tunes), which have produced many songs. Following is an incomplete list of almost every song they have produced.

== Discography ==
=== Studio albums ===
- 2003: Mas Flow
- 2005: Mas Flow 2
- 2006: Mas Flow: Los Benjamins
- TBA: Mas Flow 3

=== Other albums ===
- 2004: La Trayectoria (Compilation album)
- 2004: The Kings of the Beats
- 2004: La Mision 4: The Take Over (Compilation album)
- 2006: Mas Flow 2.5 (Re-release album)
- 2006: Reggaeton Hits (Compilation album)
- 2006: The Kings of the Beats 2
- 2007: Los Benjamins: La Continuación (Re-edition album)
- 2007: 20 #1's Now (Compilation album)

== Hits ==
Many of today's reggaeton hits were produced by Luny Tunes. Some examples are:

- Tito El Bambino's "Caile"
- Daddy Yankee's "Gasolina"
- Wisin & Yandel's "Rakata"
- Zion's "Alócate"
- Ivy Queen's "Te He Querido, Te He Llorado"
- Don Omar's "Dale Don Dale"
- Tego Calderón's "Métele Sazón"
- Voltio's "Bumper"

== Remixes ==
Luny Tunes have remixed several songs, which include:

- Janet Jackson's "Call on Me", ft. Nelly
- Paris Hilton's "Stars Are Blind" ft. Wisin & Yandel
- Alejandro Sanz's "Te Lo Agradezco, Pero No" (Luny Tunes & Tainy Remix) ft. Shakira
- RBD's Lento ft. Wisin & Yandel
- Lenny Kravits ft. Wisin & Yandel "Absolut Remix"
- R. Kelly ft. Wisin & Yandel "Burn It Up"
- Frankie J ft Mr. Phillips "Obsession (Luny Tunes Remix)"
- Ricky Martin's "Drop It on Me" ft. Daddy Yankee.
- Ricky Martin's "Qué Más Da" (Luny Tunes Remix) (Spanish version of "I Don't Care") ft. Fat Joe and Amerie.

== Albums credits ==
- 2002 A La Reconquista (Héctor & Tito)
- 2002 Guillaera (Las Guanábanas)
- 2002 Rompiendo el Hielo (Magnate & Valentino)
- 2003 El Abayarde (Tego Calderón)
- 2003 The Last Don (Don Omar)
- 2003 Los Matadores del Genero (Various Artists)
- 2003 MVP (Various Artists)
- 2003 Blin Blin Vol. 1 (Various Artists)
- 2003 Sonando Diferente (Yaga & Mackie)
- 2004 Barrio Fino (Daddy Yankee)
- 2004 12 Discípulos (Various Artists)
- 2004 Diva (Ivy Queen)
- 2004 Motivando a la Yal (Zion & Lennox)
- 2004 Vida Escante (Nicky Jam)
- 2004 Los Bacatranes (Trebol Clan)
- 2004 La Mision 4: The Take Over (Various Artists)
- 2004 Quien Contra Mí (Yandel)
- 2004 Todo A Su Tiempo (Divino)
- 2004 Los MVP (Angel & Khriz)
- 2005 Desafío (Various Artists)
- 2005 Sangre Nueva (Various Artists)
- 2005 Pa'l Mundo (Wisin & Yandel)
- 2005 40 Entre Las 2 (K-Narias)
- 2006 Top of the Line (Tito "El Bambino")
- 2008 Semblante Urbano (El Roockie)
- 2008 Luny Tunes Presents: Erre XI (Erre XI)
- 2008 Mi Flow: This Is It (Baby Ranks)
- 2008 El Fenómeno (Arcángel)

== 2002 ==
Héctor & Tito - A La Reconquista

- 01. Yo Te Buscaba (produced with Noriega)
- 02. Gata Salvaje ft. Daddy Yankee and Nicky Jam (produced with Eliel)
- 03. Besos En La Boca (produced with Eliel)
- 07. Caserío ft. Don Omar (produced with Noriega)
- 08. Tigresa (produced with Noriega and DJ Nelson)

Magnate & Valentino - Rompiendo el Hielo

- 05. Gata Celosa ft. Héctor & Tito (produced with Noriega)

== 2003 ==
Wisin & Yandel - Mi Vida... My Life

- 03. Esta Noche Hay Pelea
- 22. No Sé
- 24. Piden Perreo ft. Alexis & Fido

Tego Calderón - El Abayarde

- Al Natural
- Guasa Guasa
- Lleva y Trae

Don Omar - The Last Don

- 01. Intro (produced with Eliel)
- 02. Dale Don Más Duro ft. Glory (produced with Eliel)
- 03. Intocable (produced with Eliel)
- 06. La Noche Está Buena ft. Daddy Yankee (produced with Eliel)
- 07. Provocándome (produced with Eliel)
- 08. Caseríos 2 ft. Héctor el Father (produced with Eliel)

DJ Nelson presenta Luny Tunes & Noriega Mas Flow

- 01. All Star Intro
- 02. Cae La Noche
- 03. Aventura
- 04. Entre Tú y Yo
- 05. Métele Sazón
- 06. Cójela Que Va Sin Jockey
- 07. Hay Algo En Ti
- 08. Bailando Provocas
- 09. Motívate Al Baile
- 10. Busco una Mujer
- 11. Bella Dama
- 12. La Gata Suelta
- 13. Tú Me Pones Mal
- 14. Si Te Preguntan
- 15. Tú Anda Sola
- 16. Tú Sabes
- 17. Métele Perro
- 18. Te Quiero Ver
- 19. Quisiera
- 20. No Seas Niña

Los Matadores del Genero

- 02. Chica Ven (by Plan B) (produced with Noriega and DJ Goldy)
- 03. Pasto y Pelea (by Don Omar) (produced with Noriega)
- 04. Baílalo Como Tú Quieras (by Tego Calderón)
- 05. Soy El Matador (by Angel & Khriz)
- 06. Te Quiero (by Nicky Jam) (produced with Noriega)
- 07. Me Gusta Ver (by Rey Pirin & Don Chezina)
- 08. Las Gatas Se Alborotan (by John Eric)
- 09. No Te Sientas Sola (by Alberto Stylee) (produced with Noriega)
- 10. Dame Lo Que Tienes (by Johnny Prez) (produced with Noriega)
- 11. Eres Mi Matadora (by Karel & Julio Voltio) (produced with Noriega)
- 12. Yo Soy Tu Hombre (by Zion & Lennox) (produced with Noriega)
- 13. Matador En La Raya (by Angel Doze) (produced with Noriega)

MVP

- 03. Dale Don Dale (by Don Omar) (produced with Noriega and Cheka)
- 09. Baila Pa' Mí (by Zion & Lennox) (produced with Noriega)

Blin Blin Vol.1

- 01. Yo Puedo Con Todos (by Don Omar) (produced with Eliel)
- 02. Villana (by Héctor & Tito) (produced with Nely)
- 03. Se Activaron Los Pistoleros (by Wisin & Yandel)
- 04. Aquí Está Tu Caldo (by Daddy Yankee)
- 07. Dime Si Te Pongo Mal (by Jomar, Héctor & Tito)
- 09. No Pierdas Tiempo (by Wisin & Yandel, Tony Dize) (produced with Nely)
- 15. Tú y Yo (by Cheka) (produced with Cheka)

Yaga & Mackie - Sonando Diferente

- 02. Si Tú Me Calientas (produced with Noriega)
- 03. Maulla ft. Daddy Yankee
- 04. Yo Quisiera ft. Tego Calderón (produced with Noriega)
- 12. Princesa ft. Cheka (produced with Noriega)

== 2004 ==
Wisin & Yandel - De Otra Manera

- 03. Salgo Filateau ft. Divino & Baby Ranks
- 07. ¿Por Qué Me Peleas?
- 10. No Sé

Tego Calderón - El Enemy de los Guasíbiri

- 07. Guasa Guasa ft. Julio Voltio
- 08. Al Natural ft. Yandel

Daddy Yankee - Barrio Fino

- 02. King Daddy
- 05. Gasolina (with vocals by Glory)
- 06. Like You
- 08. Lo Que Pasó, Pasó (produced with Eliel)
- 09. Tu Príncipe ft. Zion & Lennox
- 10. Cuéntame (produced with Eliel and Naldo)
- 18. Golpe de Estado ft. Tommy Viera (produced with Nely)
- 19. 2 Mujeres

12 Discípulos

- 03. Donde Hubo Fuego/Pa' Tras, Pa' Lante (by Daddy Yankee and Eddie Dee)
- 04. Punto y Aparte (by Tego Calderón)
- 07. Tú y Yo (by Nicky Jam) (produced with Eliel)

Ivy Queen - Diva

- 20. Quiero Saber (ft. Gran Omar) (produced with DJ Nelson and Noriega)

Zion & Lennox - Motivando a la Yal

- 03. Bandida
- 14. Ahora (ft. Angel Doze) (produced with Nely)
- 15. Interlude (Remix) ft. Mr. Goldy
- 4. Yo Voy (ft. Daddy Yankee)

Los Anormales

- 06. Llégale (by Divino) (produced with Nely)
- 09. Gata Michu Michu (by Alexis & Fido) (produced with Naldo and Nesty)

Nicky Jam - Vida Escante

- 03. Vive Contigo (produced with Nely)
- 06. Chambonea
- 09. Va Pasando El Tiempo (ft. Don Chezina)(produced with Nesty and Naldo)
- 15. Tus Ojos

Trebol Clan - Los Bacatranes

- 03. Agárrala
- 04. No Le Temas a Él (ft. Héctor & Tito)
- 06. Corre y Píllala
- 09. Gata Fiera (ft. Héctor el Father & Joan) (produced with Joan and Mr.G)
- 11. Mi Vida

La Mision 4: The Take Over

Disc 1

- 05. Pierde El Control (by Aniel) (produced with Nesty, Naldo and Nely)
- 07. Siente El Flow (by Baby Ranks)
- 08. Fiera Callada (by Varon) (produced with Mr. G)
- 10. No Me Puedes Comprender (by Wibal & Alex) (produced with Nesty and Nely)

Disc 2

- 04. El Rolo (by Alexis & Fido)
- 06. Tú Te Entregas A Mí (by Baby Rasta & Gringo) (produced with Nely)
- 09. Sal A La Disco (by Angel Doze) (produced with Nely and Naldo)

Yandel - Quien Contra Mí

- 03. Ya Yo Me Cansé (produced with Fido)
- 04. Mami Yo Quisiera Quedarme (ft. Alexis)
- 06. Búscame
- 07. Say Ho!
- 08. La Calle Me Lo Pidió (ft. Tego Calderón) (produced with Fido)
- 11. Dembow (Remix)
- 12. Listo Para el Cantazo [Bonus Track] (ft. Alexis)

Divino - Todo A Su Tiempo

- 03. Se Activaron Los Anormales (ft. Daddy Yankee)
- 06. Super Gangsteril (feat. Polaco)
- 08. Tres Perros (ft. Angel & Khriz)(produced with Gocho)

DJ Nelson presenta Noriega Contra la Corriente

- 03. Te Encontraré (by Tito "El Bambino") (produced with Noriega)

Angel & Khriz - Los MVP

- 02. Vamos Perros
- 07. Ven Baílalo (produced with Mr. G)
- 14. Ven Baílalo (Bachata-Merengue Remix) (produced with Mr. G)

The Noise, Vol. 10: The Last Noise

- Untitled (by Baby Ranks)
- Untitled (by Wibal & Alex) (produced with Nesty)

Julio Voltio - Voltage AC

- 12. Bumper (produced with Nesty)

== 2005 ==
Luny Tunes & Baby Ranks - Mas Flow 2

- 02. Rakata
- 03. El Tiburón
- 04. Dale Castigo
- 05. Mírame
- 06. Es Mejor Olvidarlo
- 07. Mayor Que Yo
- 09. Con Rabia
- 10. Sóbale el Pelo
- 11. Te He Querido, Te He Llorado
- 12. Mírame [Mix]
- 13. Déjala Volar
- 14. Verme
- 15. Tortura
- 17. Obsession (Remix)
- 19. Fantasía

Ivy Queen - Flashback

- 06. Te He Querido, Te He Llorado
- 13. Quiero Saber
- 16. En La Disco
- 20. Yo Lamento (Salsa Version)

Desafío

- 04. En la Disco Bailoteo (by Wisin & Yandel)
- 09. Baila Conmigo (by Zion & Lennox) (produced with Noriega)
- 10. El Nalgazo (by Alexis & Fido) (produced with Noriega)
- 14. El Desafío (by Tego Calderón, Don Omar, Wisin & Yandel, Alexis, & Tempo) (produced with Noriega)

Héctor el Bambino & Naldo Presentan Sangre Nueva

- 05. Se la Monte (by Gadiel & Lobo, Yandel) (produced with Naldo, Nely and Nesty)
- 07. Bailando Sola (by Kartiel) (produced with Nely and Naldo)
- 10. Nueva Sangre (by Abrante & Caiko, Tego Calderón)
- 15. Sedúceme (by Danny & Chillin) (produced with Naldo and Nely)

Noztra - Ya' Aint Ready

- 03. La Disco Explota
- 10. Me Huele A Guerra

K-Narias - 40 Entre Las 2

- 08. Tu Te Entregas A Mi
- 09. Provocandome (ft. Mr. Phillips)

Ricky Martin - Life

- 08. Drop It On Me ft. Daddy Yankee (produced with will.i.am)
- 11. Que Más Da (I Don't Care) (Luny Tunes Reggaeton Mix)

El Pueblo - Del Pueblo Pa'l Pueblo

- 02. Mi Linda Flor (ft. Baby Ranks & Mr. Phillips) (produced with Nesty)

Wisin & Yandel - Pa'l Mundo

- 03. Llamé Pa' Verte (Bailando Sexy) (produced with Nely)
- 04. Paleta (ft. Daddy Yankee) (produced with Tainy)
- 06. Mayor Que Yo, Pt. 2 (produced with Nales)
- 10. Rakata (produced with Nely)
- 11. Sensación (ft. Tony Dize) (produced with Tainy and Naldo)
- 14. Mírala Bien (produced with Thilo)
- 16. Lento
- 17. Títere (produced with Nesty)
- 18. Yo Quiero

Daddy Yankee - Barrio Fino en Directo

- 02. King Daddy [Live]
- 05. Tu Príncipe [Live] ft. Zion & Lennox
- 09. Lo Que Pasó, Pasó [Live] (produced with Eliel)
- 10. Gasolina [Live]
- 12. Machucando

12 Discípulos: Special Edition

- 01. Taladro (by Daddy Yankee and Eddie Dee) (produced with Monserrate & DJ Urba, Fish and Tainy)

== 2006 ==
Divino - Todo A Su Tiempo (Platinum Edition)

- 03. Noche de Travesura ft. Héctor el Father (produced with Nely)
- 06. Llégale (produced with Nely)

K-Narias - Hombres Con Pañales

- 02. Mentiroso ft. Angel Lopez and Baby Ranks

Tito "El Bambino" - Top of The Line

- 02. Caile (produced with Tainy, Nales and Thilo)
- 05. Secreto (Luny only; produced with Nales)
- 07. Tu Cintura (ft. Don Omar) (produced with Tainy)
- 09. Reto (produced with Tainy)
- 10. Peligro (produced with Tainy)
- 11. Flow Natural (ft. Deevani and Beenie Man) (produced with Tainy and Nales)
- 15. Corre y Dile (produced with Tainy & Noriega)

N.O.R.E. - N.O.R.E. y la Familia...Ya Tú Sabe

- 07. Vente Mami ft. Pharrell and Zion

Janet Jackson - Call on Me (Remixes)

- "Call on Me" (with Nelly) (Luny Tunes Remix)

Paris Hilton - Paris (Limited Edition, with a poster) / iTunes Digital Single

- Stars Are Blind (Luny Tunes Remix) ft. Wisin & Yandel

Tego Calderón - The Underdog/El Subestimado

- 17. Cuando Baila Reggaetón ft. Yandel (produced with Tainy and Joker)

Wisin & Yandel - Pa'l Mundo: Deluxe Edition

Disc 2

- 01. Pam Pam (produced with Tainy, Joker and Naldo)
- 06. Burn It Up ft. R. Kelly (produced with Nely)

Luny Tunes & Tainy - Mas Flow: Los Benjamins

- 01. Royal Rumble (Se Van)
- 02. Lento
- 03. Hello
- 04. Entrégate
- 05. Beautiful
- 06. Noche de Entierro (Nuestro Amor)
- 07. Mi Fanática
- 08. Esta Noche
- 10. De Ti Me Enamoré
- 11. Slow Motion
- 12. Alócate
- 13. Tocarte
- 15. Acelera
- 16. Clack Clack
- 17. Piden Reggaetón
- 20. Tú Me Arrebata
- 21. No Te Quiere
- 22. Libertad
- 23. Lento (Remix)
- 00. Bajo la Vigilia de un Santo (by El Roockie) (didn't make to the final cut)

RBD - Rebels

- 12. Money Money

== 2007 ==
Luny Tunes & Tainy - Los Benjamins: La Continuación

Disc 2

- 01. Luny Tunes Taliban Beat
- 02. Lo Nuestro Se Fue (Remix)
- 03. Vete
- 04. Welcome to My Crib
- 05. Cámara
- 06. Lento (Remix)
- 07. Distancia
- 09. I Think I'm In Love
- 11. Beautiful (Remix)
- 12. Luny & Nales Remix
- 14. Entrégate (Remix)
- 16. Te Toco
- 17. Que Paso
- 18. Ven Motívame
- 19. Bien Duro
- 20. Bailándome
- 21. Reggaetón Ripiao
- 00. Sola y Triste (by Lennox ft. Lionize from Erre XI) (didn't make to the final cut)

Don Omar presenta El Pentágono

- 06. Mala Es (by Jowell & Randy) (produced with Miki)

Daddy Yankee - El Cartel: The Big Boss

- 04. Fuera de Control (produced with Tainy)

Tito "El Bambino" - It's My Time

- 03. La Pelea (produced with Noriega)

Ivy Queen - Sentimiento (Platinum Edition)

- 04. Dime Si Recuerdas (produced with Noriega)

== 2008 ==
El Roockie - Semblante Urbano

- 02. Parece Sincera (produced with Predikador)
- 11. Vigilia De Un Santo (produced with Tainy)
- 14. Giales del Ghetto

Daddy Yankee - Talento de Barrio

- 05. Llamado de Emergencia (Luny only; produced with Eli "El Musicólogo" and Predikador)
- 07. Salgo Pa' La Calle (feat. Randy) (produced with Tainy)

Erre XI - Luny Tunes Presents: Erre XI

- 01. Carita Bonita (feat. Pee Wee) (produced with Noriega)
- 02. Al Desnudo (produced with Nales & Predikador)
- 03. La Carta (produced with Noriega)
- 04. Invisible (feat. Zion & Lennox) (produced with Noriega & Predikador)
- 05. MSN (produced with Mambo Kingz)
- 06. Febrero 14 (produced with Noriega, Ivy Queen (in lyrics) & Tainy)
- 07. Llorare (feat. Alexis)
- 08. Ella Me Amó (produced with Tone & Jery)
- 09. Te Hice Volar (feat. La Sista) (produced with Predikador)
- 11. Castigo (feat. Guelo Star) (produced with Noriega)
- 12. Llorare
- 13. Dímelo (produced with DJ Dicky)
- 14. Carita Bonita (Trance Version) (produced with Noriega)

Baby Ranks - Mi Flow: This Is It

- 03. Suave (produced with Predikador)
- 08. Detras de Ti
- 10. Tell Me Why

Arcangel - El Fenómeno

- 03. Él No Se Va A Enterar (produced with Tainy & Noriega)
- 05. Demente Bailando (produced with Tainy)
- 06. Agresivo 3 (ft. J-King) (produced with Hyde & DJ Coffie)

== 2009 ==
Wisin & Yandel - La Revolución

- 14. Besos Mojados (produced with Victor "El Nasi")
- 15. Descara (Remix) (ft. Yomo) (produced with Nesty, Victor, DJ Memo & Haze)

Ana Bárbara - Rompiendo Cadenas

- 04. Rompiendo Cadenas (ft. Dyland & Lenny)

== 2010 ==
Ivy Queen - Drama Queen

- 07. Acercate (ft. Wisin & Yandel) (Produced with Tainy)
- 10. Cosas De La Vida (ft. Frank Reyes) (Produced with Lenny Santos)
- 13. La Vida Es Así - Bachata Version (Produced with Tainy)

Ivy Queen - Drama Queen Deluxe Edition

- 03. Aya Aya

== 2012 ==
Farruko - The Most Powerful Rookie

- Feel the Rhythm

J Álvarez - Imperio Nazza: J Álvarez Edition

- No Me Hagas Esperar (produced with Musicólogo & Menes)
- Nos Matamos Bailando (ft. Daddy Yankee) (produced with Musicólogo & Menes)
- Una Noche Más (ft. Franco El Gorila) (produced with Musicólogo & Menes)

Daddy Yankee - Prestige

- Limbo (Luny only, produced with MadMusick)

== 2013 ==
Dyland & Lenny - My World 2

- 02. Más No Puedo Amarte
- 03. Darte Lo Tuyo (ft. J Álvarez) (produced with Swifft)
- 06. La Cura (ft. Yomo) (produced with Swifft)
- 07. Que Vuele (ft. Víctor Manuelle)
- 08. El Juego (ft. Cosculluela) (produced with Tainy)
- 09. Sólo Palabras (produced with Predikador)
- 10. Sin Tu Amor (ft. Ángel López) (produced with Predikador)

Yandel - De Líder a Leyenda

- 07. Moviendo Caderas (ft. Daddy Yankee) (produced with MadMusick & Predikador)

Víctor Manuelle - Me Llamaré Tuyo

- 07. No Vuelvo (ft. Ken-Y) (produced with Noriega)
- 09. Tiempo al Tiempo (produced with Noriega)

J-King & Maximan - Los Sucesores

- 09. Amor Cibernético

== 2014 ==
Wisin - El Regreso del Sobreviviente

- 02. Mucho Bajo
- 03. Adrenalina (ft. Jennifer Lopez & Ricky Martin) (produced with Chris Jeday & MadMusick)
- 04. Adicto
- 05. Heavy Heavy (ft. Tempo) (produced with Predikador & Hyde)
- 10. Que Viva la Vida (produced with Predikador)
- 13. Que Viva la Vida (ft. Michel Teló) (produced with Predikador)

Alexis & Fido - La Esencia

- 03. Algaretismo
- 04. Sudao (ft. Zion & Lennox) (produced with Predikador)
- 06. Alócate (produced with MadMusick & Predikador)
- 15. Rompe la Cintura (produced with MadMusick)

Plan B - Love & Sex

- 02. Choca
- 14. Candy (produced with DJ Duran)
- 15. Sátiro (ft. Amaro)
- 16. Love and Sex (produced with DJ Duran)

== 2015 ==
Yandel - Dangerous

- 15. Tu Cura (ft. Gadiel)
- 16. Riversa (ft. De La Ghetto) (produced with Predikador)

== 2023 ==
Don Omar, Wisin and Yandel - single

- "Sandunga"

== See also ==
- Luny Tunes
- Mas Flow Inc
- Noriega
- Noriega production discography
- DJ Nelson
