= Noriega production discography =

Noriega is a reggaeton producer alongside Luny Tunes. The following is an incomplete list of almost every song he has produced.

== Discography ==
=== Studio albums ===
- 2003: Mas Flow
- 2004: Contra la Corriente
- 2006: Sin Control

== 2002 ==
Héctor & Tito - A La Reconquista

- 01. Yo Te Buscaba
- 07. Caserío (ft. Don Omar)
- 08. Tigresa

Las Guanábanas - Guillaera

- 03. Vamos Pa'la Disco

Magnate y Valentino - Rompiendo el Hielo

- 05. Gata Celosa (ft. Héctor y Tito)

== 2003 ==
Ivy Queen - Diva

- 07. "Me Acostumbré"
- 20. Quiero Saber (ft. Gran Omar) (produced with DJ Nelson and Luny Tunes)

Tego Calderón - El Abayarde

- 01. Intro
- 03. Al Natural
- 10. Guasa Guasa
- 16. Lleva y Trae

Vico C - En Honor A La Verdad

- 01. Intro
- 02. En Honor De La Verdad
- 03. Capicú
- 04. 5 De Septiembre (Acoustic Version)
- 05. Flowowow
- 06. Para Mi Barrio
- 07. En La Barbería (Skit)
- 08. Superman
- 09. Masacote
- 10. El Bueno, El Malo, y El Feo (ft. Eddie Dee and Tego Calderón)
- 11. Yerba Mala
- 12. Mi Forma De Tiraera
- 13. 5 De Septiembre (Reggaeton Remix)
- 14. Para Mi Barrio (Reggaeton Remix)
- 15. El Bueno, El Malo, y El Feo (Reggaeton Remix)

DJ Nelson Presenta: Luny Tunes & Noriega - Mas Flow

- 02. Cae La Noche - Hector y Tito
- 05. Metele Sazon - Tego Calderón
- 11. Bella Dama - Yaga & Mackie
- 12. La Gata Suelta - Glory
- 13. Tu Me Pones Mal - Angel y Khriz
- 14. Si Te Preguntan - Nicky Jam
- 15. Tu Anda Sola - Jomar
- 18. Te Quiero Ver - Cidellis
- 19. Quiseria - John Eric
- 20. No Seas Nina - Angel Doze

Los Matadores del Genero

- 02. Chica Ven - Plan B
- 03. Pasto y Pelea - Don Omar
- 06. Te Quiero - Nicky Jam
- 09. No Te Sientas Sola - Alberto Stylee
- 10. Dame Lo Que Tienes - Johnny Prez
- 11. Eres Mi Matadora - Karel & Julio Voltio
- 12. Yo Soy Tu Hombre - Zion & Lennox
- 13. Matador En La Raya - Angel Doze

MVP

- 03. Dale Don Dale - Don Omar
- 04. ¿Qué Vas A Hacer? - Divino
- 09. Baila Pa' Mi - Zion & Lennox

Yaga & Mackie - Sonando Diferente

- 02. Si Tú Me Calientas
- 04. Yo Quisiera (ft. Tego Calderón)
- 10. Contra El Viento
- 12. Princesa (ft. Cheka)

== 2004 ==
DJ Nelson Presenta: Noriega - Contra la Corriente

- 01. Intro
- 02. Tócale Bocina - Alexis & Fido
- 03. Te Encontraré - Tito El Bambino
- 04. No Tengas Miedo - Zion & Lennox
- 05. Quítate La Ropa - Tony Dize
- 06. Si Te Vas - Kartiel
- 07. Yo Tengo El Control - Cheka
- 08. Linda Estrella - Baby Rasta
- 09. Que Daría Yo - Las Guanábanas
- 10. Amiga No Pienses - Ivy Queen
- 11. Tú y Yo Nena - John Eric
- 12. Como Lo Bailas Tú - Mickey Perfecto
- 13. Más Fuerte - Angel y Khriz (ft. Taina)
- 14. Vámonos A Toa - Master Joe & O.G. Black
- 15. Ven y Baila - Valery
- 16. Viento - Ranking Stone
- 17. Desespero - Nashly & Julio Voltio
- 18. Vuelve A Mí - Yaga & Mackie
- 19. Suelta - Johnny Perez
- 20. Tú y Yo - Sabios
- 21. Escápate Conmigo - Maicol & Manuel
- 22. Move Dale Mami - Shaka & Waco
- 23. Amiga No Pienses - Ivy Queen (Salsa Remix)

Las Guanábanas - Collection Two

- ???

Tego Calderón - El Enemy de los Guasíbiri

- 07. Guasa Guasa (ft. Julio Voltio)
- 08. Al Natural (ft. Yandel)

Zion & Lennox - Motivando a la Yal

- 11. Hace Tiempo
- 12. Mírame
- 18. No Me Compares

Baby Rasta & Gringo - Sentenciados

- ???

Desafío

- 02. Mix - Don Omar, Tempo, Tego Calderón, Wisin & Yandel, Alexis (produced with Luny Tunes)
- 04. En La Disco Bailoteo - Wisin y Yandel (produced with Luny Tunes)
- 05. La Vida - Tego Calderon (produced with Luny Tunes)
- 07. Baila Conmigo - Zion & Lennox (produced with Luny Tunes)
- 08. El Nalgazo - Alexis & Fido (produced with Luny Tunes)
- 09. Llegaste - Jomar (produced with Luny Tunes)
- 10. Tu Cuerpo En La Disco - Karel & Voltio (produced with Luny Tunes)
- 14. Tu Cuerpo Quiero Tocar - Baby Rasta & Gringo (produced with Luny Tunes)
- 18. Cae La Noche - Falo (produced with Luny Tunes)
- 19. Te Invito Al Party - Los Ganjas (produced with Luny Tunes)
- 22. Acercate - Guanabanas (produced with Luny Tunes)

Eddie Dee - 12 Discípulos

- 12. Que Es La Que Hay - Ivy Queen (produced with Rafi Mercenario)

Divino - Todo A Su Tiempo

- 01. Intro
- 07. Sola (produced with DJ Blass)

Ivy Queen - Real

- 04. Matando (produced with Rafi Mercenario and Monserrate)
- 07. Dile (produced with DJ Nelson)
- 18. Rebulera (produced with Rafi Mercenario)

== 2005 ==
Angel & Khriz - Los MVP's

- 09. Toda Te Lo Di (produced with Barbosa)

Ivy Queen - Flashback

- 13. Quiero Saber (ft. Gran Omar) (produced with Luny Tunes and DJ Nelson)
- 15. Amiga No Pienses
- 20. Amiga No Pienses (Salsa Remix)

Ricky Martin - Life

- 01. Til I Get You
- 02. I Won't Desert You
- 04. Don't Time Tonight
- 05. Life
- 09. This Is Good
- 10. Save The Dance

Alexis & Fido - The Pitbulls (album)

- ???

== 2006 ==
Alexis & Fido - Los Reyes del Perreo

- 06. Tocale Bocina (produced with DJ Nelson and DJ Sonic)
- 13. Ella Le Gusta (produced with Luny Tunes)

Tito "El Bambino" - Top of the Line

- Corre y Dile (produced with Luny Tunes)

== 2007 ==
Tito "El Bambino" - It's My Time

- 03. La Pelea (produced with Luny Tunes)

Ivy Queen - Sentimiento

- 13. Mañana Al Despertar

Ivy Queen - Sentimiento: Platinum Edition

- 04. Dime Si Recuerdas (produced with Luny Tunes)

== 2008 ==
Arcángel - El Fenómeno

- 02. Por Amar A Ciegas (produced with Luny Tunes and Tainy)
- 03. Él No Se Va an Enterar (produced with Luny Tunes and Tainy)
- 07. Ta' Bueno El Ambiente (produced with Noltom)
- 21. Por Amar A Ciegas (Hip-Hop Version) (produced with Luny Tunes)

Erre XI - Luny Tunes Presents: Erre XI

- 01. Carita Bonita (produced with Luny Tunes)
- 03. La Carta (produced with Luny Tunes)
- 04. Invisible (produced with Luny Tunes)
- 06. Febrero 14 (produced with Luny Tunes and Tainy)
- 11. Castigo (produced with Luny Tunes)
- 14. Carita Bonita (Trance Version) (produced with Luny Tunes)

El Roockie - Semblante Urbano

- 03. Tell Me Why

== 2009 ==
=== Desolo ===
- 01. You Are God Songs
- 02. Bernard
- 03. Detriment
- 04. Life By Myself
- 05. Ballacaust

== 2010 ==
Ivy Queen - Quiero Amanecer Contigo (Unreleased)

- 01. Quiero Amanecer Contigo

== 2011 ==
Gocho - Mi Musica

- 03. "Dandole" - Remix (Featuring Jowell and Ivy Queen)

== 2012 ==
Ivy Queen - Musa

- 3. Peligro De Extinción (produced with Predikator)

== 2016 ==
=== Noriega Cristiano ===
- 01. Dibújame el Sendero
- 02. Fichau
- 03. Una Hoja en el Viento
- 04. Todo Poderoso
- 05. Una Herida en el Pecho
- 06. Santo Santo Santo
- 07. Venceré
- 08. Yo Tengo un Gozo
- 09. Vuelvo
- 10. Una Hoja en el Viento (Video Version)

== 2021 ==
=== Noriega ===
- Wisky y Tequila

== 2022 ==
=== Noriega ===
- Robarte
- Robarte (Remix)

== 2023 ==
=== Noriega ===
- Tardio
- Deseo
- Dime Como Acaricio

== 2024 ==
=== Noriega ===
- Recuperando El Control
- Pajarito Azul
- Una Oracion
- Me Rescato
- Doblon tras Doblon
- Sin Dramas
- Enamorado de Ti

== 2025 ==
=== Noriega ===
- Rain on Zinc Roof
- Mountain Birds Morning
- Africa
- Anti Gravity
- Fichao (feat. Dmarco Ministry)
- Rio Arriba
- CHIQUIŁŁA

== 2026 ==
=== Noriega ===
- Sky Temple
- Caribbean Rooster Dawn
- Prayer Atmosphere
- Whispering Trees
- 66 Karnalio
- Indirian Mood

=== Boleros sin Fronteras ===
- 01. Mitad de Mi
- 02. Te Pertenezco
- 03. Si te tengo asi
- 04. Pudieras ver
- 05. Hasta el Doce de Nunca
- 06. Sombras de papel
- 07. Como tu
- 08. Amor Incondicional
- 09. Cada instante contigo
- 10. Frío Y Fuego
- 11. Mi Dulce Mujer
- 12. Sin Pedirte promesas
- 13. Cuando seas tu
- 14. Cuando seas tu
- 15. Aquellos ojos
- 16. Mi vida en tu mirada
- 17. Nadie lo sabe
- 18. Nunca te pedí
- 19. la llegada
- 20. Lo que queda del amor
- 21. Hijo Mio
- 22. Tres caminos, una sangre

=== Canciones De Cuna, Vol.1 ===
- 01. Duérmete Mi Amor
- 02. El Ruiseñor De Media Noche
- 03. Nubes De Burbujas
- 04. Lluvias De Colores
- 05. Flores De Papel
- 06. Cielos De Cristal
- 07. Noche De Estrellitas

=== Descontrol ===
- 01. Descontrol
- 02. Ya no quiero bailar así
- 03. Si no te amare
- 04. Sin Razon
- 05. Contigo hasta el cielo
- 06. Condena de Amor
- 07. Creo
- 08. Aguantando
- 09. Irresistible
- 10. Amaneci Sin Calor
- 11. Nadie ama a Nadie
- 12. No lo puedes evitar
- 13. No Puedo
- 14. Una noche mas
- 15. Vuelveme a querer
- 16. Donde empiezas tu
- 17. Ya no voy a esperar
- 18. Bailando se olvida
- 19. Porque no sos mia
- 20. La ultima vuelta
- 21. Noche fresca
- 22. Enredado
- 23. Nos ganó el corazón
- 24. Esperando asi
- 25. Por qué así
- 26. Enviciado
- 27. Dale otra vez
