= Mas Flow: Los Benjamins =

Compilation album by Luny Tunes & Tainy
- Released: September 26, 2006; May 15, 2007 (re-edition)
- Recorded: 2005–2006
- Genre: Reggaeton
- Label: Mas Flow; Machete
- Producer: Luny Tunes (Exec.), Tainy (Co-exec.), DJ Nelson, Nely, Doble A & Nales "Los Presidentes", Mr. G, Gomez, Thilo, Miki, Noriega

Luny Tunes & Tainy chronology
Reggaeton Hits (2006)	Mas Flow: Los Benjamins (2006)	The Kings of the Beats 2 (2006)

Singles from Mas Flow: Los Benjamins
- 1. "Noche de Entierro (Nuestro Amor)" Released: October 2006; 2. "Royal Rumble (Se Van)" Released: October 2006; 3. "Lento" Released: December 2006

Alternative cover
- Los Benjamins: La Continuación re-edition cover

Mas Flow: Los Benjamins is the third compilation album by reggaeton producers Luny Tunes, released on September 26, 2006, by Mas Flow Inc. and Machete Music. The album features appearances by RBD, Don Omar, Daddy Yankee, Héctor el Father, Tito El Bambino, Wisin & Yandel, Alexis & Fido, Zion, Magnate, Ñejo & Dalmata, Arcángel & De la Ghetto, and others. It also featured the work of 17-year-old producer Marco Masis, better known as Tainy.

Mas Flow: Los Benjamins receive mixed to positive reviews by critics and fans. The album debuted at number one on US Billboard Top Latin Albums and US Latin Rhythms Albums. Also debut at number 30 on US Billboard 200. Eventually, the album was nominated as Reggaeton Album Of The Year on 2007 Billboard Latin Music Awards.

Shortly after releasing Mas Flow: Los Benjamins, reggaeton producers Luny Tunes released Los Benjamins: La Continuación. Essentially a deluxe edition of Mas Flow: Los Benjamins, La Continuación includes roughly two and a half hours of music spread over the course of two CDs and one DVD. The first CD is the original edition of Los Benjamins without the two unlisted bonus tracks on the end of that album. The second CD is composed of remixes of key songs from Los Benjamins, in addition to ten new songs, an opening instrumental, and four "bonus tracks" from the previously released compilation Raices del Reggaeton. The DVD includes a few videos. It was released on May 15, 2007.

== Background ==
LunyTunes began working on their follow-up to Mas Flow 2 in the year of 2005 immediately following the release of their multi-platinum hit album (latin certification). There were multiple productions slotted for release by their company "Mas Flow Inc." at the time under the distribution of Machete Music/Universal Latino; some of these included Baby Ranks "Mi Flow: This is It" (Eventually released by Star-dome Entertainment), "Raices Del Reggaeton" released by their subsidiary "Benjamins Records" and the unreleased and unfinished "Loyalty Records presents: About Time". In order to facilitate release schedules and budgets, "Mas Flow Inc" created separate affiliated companies such as "Gravity Blu" (design and arts company/record label headed by G'rald), "Benjamin Records" (managed by Alexis and Fido's disc jockey DJ Coffee) and "Loyalty Records" (little is known about this company except for the fact they planned to release albums from Yo-Seph The One, Mr Phillip and Lui-gi 21 Plus along with the much anticipated "Loyalty Records presents: About Time" compilation.)

Much of these projects slated for release were either delayed or went over budget due to "Mas Flow Inc."'s unexpected success and high demand in the latin music industry for musical compositions from the "Mas Flow" production team led by Luny Tunes. The album "Luny Tunes y Baby Ranks presentan: Mas Flow 2" faced a similar dilemma as the album was originally intended to be Baby Ranks' solo debut but pressure from Universal Latino forced "Mas Flow Inc." to rush the completion of "Mas Flow 2" and many of the Baby Ranks tracks included in "Mas Flow 2" were originally meant for his solo album "My Time: This Is It" later renamed "Mi Flow: This Is It". Originally, the album "Millenium" was supposed to be released by "Mas Flow Inc." with the lead single "El Señor De La Noche" by Don Omar already in rotation in Puerto Rico and Latin America, but the album was shelved due to the dissatisfaction from Universal Latino executives at the time and the company was ordered by Universal Latino to rework the album. "Los Benjamins" was originally meant to be "Mas Flow 3" but because of budget issues, constraints, release schedule deadlines, and many unfinished products, the final tracklist was a compilation of songs from the intended "Mas Flow 3" and songs meant for unfinished productions such as "Millenium" and "Loyalty Records presents: About Time".

There was much hype placed for "Los Benjamins" with Luny Tunes receiving a record breaking contract with Universal Latino (rumored to be worth around $10 million) for their musical compositions from their production team and any future releases from their record label Mas Flow Inc. to be distributed by Machete Music/Universal Latino. Universal Latino ordered a million physical copies to be made of "Los Benjamins" as they expected the album to be equally as successful as "Mas Flow 2" (most latin albums at the time would have only 30-50 thousand physical cd's made unless they were of a world renowned acts such as "Shakira" or "Enrique Iglesias") . The lead single "Noche De Entierro (Nuestro Amor)" featuring Daddy Yankee, Hector "El Father", Zion, Tony Tun Tun and Wisin y Yandel received a mass promotional campaign from Universal Latino on a worldwide level and became a top 10 single all across Latin America and the United States.

== Concept ==
Originally "Los Benjamins" was supposed to be "Mas Flow 3" but because of issues with the executives at Universal Latino during the time, the product was rushed to release and renamed because the company "Mas Flow Inc." felt the product was not a proper sequel for the popular series as the sound was more pop-oriented than its predecessors. Many songs originally intended for other productions made it to the final version of "Los Benjamins", most notably tracks from unfinished products such as the shelved "Millenium" and "Loyalty Records presents: About Time".

== Reception ==
Mas Flow: Los Benjamin debuted at number one on US Top Latin Albums and at 30 on US Billboard 200. In its first two months, the album sold 80,000 copies in the United States. Following the re-release, the album jumped from 43 to the number one of US Top Latin Albums and Latin Rhythm Albums and re-enter at 97 on US Billboard 200. The album stayed six weeks in total at the top of US Billboard Latin Rhythm Albums.

During its initial release, the album received mixed reactions both critically and commercially for not living up to the sales originally projected by Universal Latino. Machete Music/Universal Latino expected to sell a million copies worldwide within a year, "Los Benjamins" only sold 300,000 during its first year run (Overall numbers remain unknown to the public). It was one of the first latin albums to be heavily featured on iTunes leading to successful sales of the single "Noche De Entierro (Nuestro Amor)". The product was deemed too commercial for the authentic reggaeton audience and too "street" for the mainstream public. Many consider this album to be one of the prime reasons the reggaeton genre fell out of favor with the major record labels and eventually the mainstream as the album underperformed at the time while receiving a very expensive budget from Universal Music. It would not be until J Balvin and Nicky Jam's crossover mainstream success in 2014 and forward, that the major record labels would again look at reggaeton as a forerunner in the latin music industry. Many fans at the time, felt "Los Benjamins" did not live up to the hype generated in the latin media as it is generally regarded as inferior to both "Mas Flow 1" and "Mas Flow 2" which were more organic productions connected with the authentic reggaeton from the streets versus "Los Benjamins" which is more pop influenced going as far to include the most famous pop group in latin music during that time in "RBD".

The lead single "Noche De Entierro (Nuestro Amor)" actually outperformed the album and became Luny Tunes' 2nd most successful single to date as lead performers (after "Mayor Que Yo"), selling over 500,000 units on iTunes in the United States alone and became a top 10 hit in Latin America as well. It appears that Universal Latino did a poor job in associating the lead single with Luny Tunes' album "Los Benjamins" as most mainstream consumers opted to buy "Noche De Entierro" on iTunes rather than the entire production. The lead single was also massively pirated in the Latin America. Mixed reviews also drew away a potentially larger audience. Over the course of time, "Los Benjamins" is now viewed as a classic album in the reggaeton genre, misunderstood at the time for its ambitious goals at pop-crossover success while maintaining reggaeton's essence and "Noche De Entierro (Nuestro Amor)" is recognized as one of the most famous songs in the history of latin music and Luny Tunes' 2nd most successful single to date as lead performers.

== Legacy ==
"Mas Flow: Los Benjamins" is credited with bridging the gap between reggaeton from the streets and traditional mainstream latin pop through Luny Tunes' collaboration with pop-rock group RBD and the success of "Noche de Entierro (Nuestro Amor)" especially in Latin America. Thanks to the efforts of commercializing the rugged street sounds of the authentic reggaeton and fusing it with more pop elements, "Los Benjamins" opened the doors for future acts such as J Balvin and CNCO renowned for their pop reggaeton fusions.

"Noche de Entierro (Nuestro Amor)" went on to become one of the most successful singles of the year and is one of the most recognized reggaeton songs of all-time. Despite low sales, thanks to massive bootlegging, "Mas Flow: Los Benjamins" became renowned throughout Latin America to the point it is now hailed as one of the classic reggaeton albums of all-time. Many songs from the album such as "Mi Fanática" by Arcángel & De la Ghetto, "Esta Noche" by Tito El Bambino, "Welcome To My Crib" by Randy and "Hello" by Zion became club hits in Latin America and are amongst the most famous songs in each of the artists' catalog.

Commercially, during its initial release, the album was considered a disaster due to low sales but over the course of time thanks to the lead single's fame and Luny Tunes' continued success, the product is now considered an important piece in the history of reggaeton music. Sadly, the downfall of the reggaeton genre during this period is largely attributed to "Mas Flow: Los Benjamins" for not living up to expectations in its initial release and major latin labels soon started to focus on other less expensive musical genres such as Mexican Regional and Latin Pop due to reggaeton's success leading to increased budgets and expenditures. Luny Tunes then signed with Fuego Music Entertainment around this time.

Albums such as "Millenium" and Baby Ranks' Mi Flow: This Is It eventually saw releases outside of the "Mas Flow" banner. "Millenium" was released in 2007 by the companies Gravity Blu and All Star Records reworking the album and having it distributed by Machete Music/Universal Latino. The album did not have any success as the final product excluded many of the leaked songs by artists' such as Nicky Jam, Don Omar and Zion that fans were expecting and "Millenium" also received no promotion with no lead single except "El Pantalon" by Don Omar which was also included in "King of Kings Live" and was a radio single with no mention of "Millenium". The original singles "El Señor De La Noche" by Don Omar and "Alocate" by Zion eventually received official releases both being reworked by Luny Tunes' production team for the albums "Los Bandoleros Reloaded" and "Los Benjamins". A leaked song by Nicky Jam feat. Carlitos Way "Tu y Yo" never received an official release outside of bootlegs in the underground reggaeton scene. All original versions have been recently released for free download and can now be found on YouTube including "El Señor De La Noche"'s original intended (unreleased) version with Violin work from Miri Ben-Ari produced by Luny Tunes.

Baby Ranks would release his much anticipated "Mi Flow: This Is It" in 2008 distributed by Stardome Entertainment (a record label based in Israel) with the lead single "El Amor Se Fue" feat Angel Lopez (of Son By Four) peaking at #14 on the billboard tropical charts. "Loyalty Records: About Time" remains unfinished due to budget issues and rejection from Universal Latino executives at the time. The album includes many incomplete and unreleased songs from the likes of "Daddy Yankee", "Wisin y Yandel", "Tito El Bambino", "Eddie Dee", "Mr Phillip", "Yo-Seph The One", and "Luigi 21 Plus" among others with the original production from Nely, Tainy, Bones, Nan2 and others. The last time the album was announced to be released to the reggaeton community was in 2008, since then nothing else has been mentioned.

== Track listing ==
=== Mas Flow: Los Benjamins ===
No.	Title	Producers	Length
1.	"Royal Rumble (Se Van)" (Wise Da 'Gangsta', Zion, Daddy Yankee, Wisin, Héctor el Father, Yomo, Franco el Gorila, Don Omar, Arcángel, Alexis, and El Roockie)	Luny Tunes & Nely	6:16
2.	"Lento" (RBD)	Luny Tunes, Way Fell & Tainy	3:16
3.	"Hello" (Zion)	Luny Tunes & Tainy	3:26
4.	"Entrégate" (Wisin & Yandel)	Luny Tunes, Tainy & Jorge "Joker" Elvira	3:45
5.	"Beautiful" (Don Omar)	Luny Tunes & Tainy	3:00
6.	"Noche de Entierro (Nuestro Amor)" (Daddy Yankee, Wisin & Yandel, Héctor el Father, Tony Tun Tun)	Luny Tunes, Nales & Mr. G	4:23
7.	"Mi Fanática" (Arcángel & De la Ghetto)	Luny Tunes & Tainy	3:48
8.	"Esta Noche" (Tito El Bambino)	Luny Tunes, Tainy & Nales	2:36
9.	"La Ex" (Alexis & Fido)	Luny Tunes, Doble A & Nales	2:54
10.	"De Ti Me Enamoré" (Baby Rasta)	Luny Tunes & Tainy	3:22
11.	"Slow Motion" (Yo-Seph "The One")	Luny Tunes, Tainy, Doble A & Nales	3:18
12.	"Alócate" (Zion)	Luny Tunes & Tainy	2:32
13.	"Tocarte" (Plan B)	Luny Tunes	2:24
14.	"Disimúlalo" (Magnate)	Luny Tunes	2:15
15.	"Acelera" (Franco el Gorila)	Luny Tunes & Tainy	2:32
16.	"Clack Clack" (Angel Doze)	Luny Tunes & Tainy	3:24
17.	"Piden Reggaetón" (Angel & Khriz)	Luny Tunes & Tainy	3:09
18.	"Deja Quitarte la Ropa" (Dalmata)	Luny & Tainy	3:17
19.	"Contigo" (Jean)	Luny Tunes & Nales	2:31
20.	"Tú Me Arrebata" (Ñejo)	Luny Tunes, Tainy & DJ Nelson	3:08
21.	"No Te Quiere" (El Roockie)	Luny Tunes & Tainy	2:30
22.	"Libertad" (Lui-G)	Luny Tunes & Tainy	2:59
23.	"Lento (Remix)" (RBD)	Luny Tunes, Way Fell & Tainy	3:21

=== Los Benjamins: La Continuación ===
- Track #1-21 from standard edition, and includes a second disc and DVD.

Disc 2

No.	Title	Producers	Length
1.	"Luny Tunes Taliban Beat"	Luny Tunes, Miki	2:15
2.	"Lo Nuestro Se Fue (Remix)" (Ivy Queen, Alex Rivera, Daddy Yankee and Wisin)	Luny Tunes, Tainy & Doble A & Nales	4:09
3.	"Vete" (Erre XI)	Luny Tunes, Noriega, Nales & Gomez	3:29
4.	"Welcome to My Crib" (Randy)	Luny Tunes & Tainy	4:07
5.	"Cámara" (Yomo)	Luny Tunes, Miki & Nales	2:38
6.	"Lento (Remix)" (RBD ft. Wisin & Yandel)	Luny Tunes & Tainy	3:55
7.	"Distancia" (Arcangel)	Luny Tunes, Miki & Tainy	3:14
8.	"Mía" (Yo-Seph "The One")	Noriega & Thilo	2:39
9.	"I Think I'm in Love" (Ektor and additional vocals by Nales)	Luny Tunes & Nales	2:44
10.	"Hello (Official Part 2)" (Erre XI)	Luny Tunes & Tainy	3:37
11.	"Beautiful (Remix)" (Don Omar)	Luny Tunes & Tainy	2:55
12.	"Luny Tunes and Nales Remix" (Nales, Daddy Yankee & Wisin)	Luny & Nales	2:20
13.	"Ando en Ésa" (O.G. Black ft. Lionize of (Erre XI))	Luny Tunes, Miki & Nales	3:12
14.	"Entrégate (Remix)" (Wisin & Yandel)	Luny Tunes, Tainy & Jorge "Joker" Elvira	3:46
15.	"Dile" (M.J. ft. Zion)	Luny Tunes	3:25
16.	"Te Toco" (High Rollers Family)	Luny Tunes, Tainy, Doble A & Nales & Miki	3:39
17.	"Qué Pasó" (Alex Killer)	Luny Tunes & Thilo	3:43
18.	"Ven Motívame [Bonus Track]" (Baby Ranks)	Luny Tunes	3:17
19.	"Bien Duro [Bonus Track]" (Falo)	Miki "La Mano Bionica"	3:05
20.	"Bailándome [Bonus Track]" (K.I.D.)	Thilo & DJ Coffie	3:24
21.	"Reggaetón Ripiao" [Bonus Track]" (Baby Shaba)	Luny Tunes, Doble A & Nales, Miki	3:34

==== DVD ====
No.	Title	Length
1.	"Noche de Entierro"
2.	"Alócate"
3.	"Esta Noche"

== Charts ==
Chart (2006)	Peak position
U.S. Billboard 200	30
U.S. Billboard Top Latin Albums	1
U.S. Billboard Top Rap Albums	9

== See also ==
- List of Billboard Latin Rhythm Albums number ones of 2007
