= La Trayectoria (Luny Tunes album) =

Compilation album by Luny Tunes
- Released: June 22, 2004
- Genre: Reggaeton
- Length: 120 min. app.
- Label: Flow Music/Universal Latino; 180 008
- Producer: Luny Tunes, Nesty, Nely, Noriega, Naldo, Eliel, DJ Nelson

Luny Tunes chronology
The Kings of the Beats (2004)	La Trayectoria (2004)	Luny Tunes Presents La Mision 4: The Take Over (2004)

La Trayectoria is a double-disc, 42-track compilation of Luny Tunes productions in the reggaeton genre released on June 22, 2004. The album includes

La Trayectoria compiles 42 songs from different Luny Tunes productions, including hits by some of the best-known artists in reggaeton from the early to mid-2000s, such as Tego Calderón, Daddy Yankee, Don Omar, Wisin & Yandel, Zion & Lennox, Baby Ranks, and others.

In Allmusic the review described it as "an outstanding album that offers quality and quantity: a perfect and affordable starter CD for neophytes."

The album was certified double platinum by the RIAA.

== Track listing ==
Disc 1

1. Amor (Baby Ranks, Jose Angel Saavedra)
2. Dime (Joan & O'Neill)
3. Tus Ojos (Nicky Jam)
4. Presión (Wibal & Alex)
5. Perdón (O'Neill)
6. Estuve Contigo (Joan)
7. Lo Mío (Yo-Seph "The One")
8. Búscame (Varón)
9. Entre Tú y Yo (Don Omar)
10. Míralos (Don Omar)
11. Esta Noche Hay Pelea (Wisin)
12. Bandida (Zion & Lennox)
13. Desafío (Tempo, Tego Calderón, Don Omar, Alexis, Wisin & Yandel)
14. Aquí Está Tu Caldo (Daddy Yankee)
15. Al Natural (Tego Calderón)
16. Guáyale El Mahón (Yandel)
17. Ya Estoy Llegando (Divino)
18. Los Pistoleros (Wisin & Yandel)
19. Si Te Pongo Mal (Hector & Tito)
20. Los Anormales (Divino & Daddy Yankee)
21. Métele Sazón (Tego Calderón)

Disc 2

1. Dale Don Dale (Don Omar)
2. Motívate Baby (Baby Ranks)
3. En La Disco Bailoteo (Wisin & Yandel)
4. Si Tú Me Calientas (Yaga & Mackie)
5. Puedo Con Todos (Don Omar)
6. En Tensión (Zion & Lennox)
7. Chica Ven (Plan B)
8. Te Quiero Ver (Baby Rasta & Gringo)
9. Pasto y Pelea (Don Omar)
10. Villana (Hector & Tito)
11. Vamos Pa' La Disco" (Las Guanábanas)
12. Quiero (Zion & Lennox)
13. Métele Con Candela (Daddy Yankee)
14. Baílalo Como Tú Quieras (Tego Calderón)
15. Maulla (Yaga & Mackie)
16. Say Ho (Yandel)
17. Cae La Noche (Hector & Tito)
18. Quiero Saber (Ivy Queen & Gran Omar)
19. Cazando Voy (Angel & Khriz)
20. Aventura (Wisin & Yandel)
21. Bailando Provocas (Trebol Clan)

== Charts ==
Chart (2004/2005)	Peak position
U.S. Billboard Top Heatseekers	16
U.S. Billboard Top Latin Albums	7
U.S. Billboard Top Reggae Albums	7

== Sales and certifications ==
Region	Certification	Certified units/sales
United States (RIAA)	2× Platinum (Latin)	200,000^{^}
^{^} Shipments figures based on certification alone.

== See also ==
- List of number-one Billboard Tropical Albums from the 2000s
