= Nely el Arma Secreta =

Puerto Rican music producer

Nely
- Also known as: N.E.A.S.; El Arma Secreta; The Secret Weapon
- Born: Josías de la Cruz; March 19, 1987 (age 39); Puerto Rico
- Genres: Reggaeton; Latin trap; hip-hop; R&B
- Occupations: Producer; songwriter
- Years active: 2003–present
- Label: Artillery Music

Josías de la Cruz (born March 19, 1987), known professionally as Nely el Arma Secreta, is a Puerto Rican reggaeton producer, introduced in the genre by Luny Tunes.

== Biography ==
Nely was born and raised in Puerto Rico. His parents are from the Dominican Republic. He began with music at the age of five years, playing drums in his local church. Aged 14 he began experimenting with reggaeton. He quickly established himself as the top producer for some of the music industry's biggest stars.

Nely was part of the reggaeton explosion, contributing to their highest selling albums including Mas Flow 2 and Wisin & Yandel's Pa'l Mundo. He produced many hits including Gansta Zone (Daddy Yankee & Snoop Dogg), Conteo (Don Omar), Rakata (Wisin & Yandel), Noche de Travesura (Héctor el Father & Divino), Cuanto Tengo Que Esperar (Zion & Lennox), Contacto (Yaviah), Burn It Up (R. Kelly) and Obsession (Frankie J).

Nely founded the label Artillery Music in 2007 which fellow producer Tainy is also a member.

== Production discography ==
- 2003 Blin Blin Vol. 1
- 2004 La Trayectoria
- 2004 Barrio Fino – (Daddy Yankee)
- 2004 Vida Escante – (Nicky Jam)
- 2004 Los Anormales
- 2004 Los Bacatranes – (Trébol Clan)
- 2004 Luny Tunes Presents La Mision 4: The Take Over
- 2004 Los MVP – (Angel & Khriz)
- 2004 Yaga & Mackie – (Clase Aparte)
- 2004 Motivando a la Yal – Zion & Lennox
- 2005 Sangre Nueva
- 2005 Mas Flow 2 – (Luny Tunes & Baby Ranks)
- 2005 TP.3 Reloaded – (R. Kelly)
- 2005 Motivando A La Yal: Special Edition – (Zion & Lennox)
- 2005 Pa'l Mundo – (Wisin & Yandel)
- 2006 Todo a Su Tiempo Platinum Edition – (Divino)
- 2006 King of Kings – (Don Omar)
- 2006 Top of the Line – (Tito El Bambino)
- 2006 Pa'l Mundo: Deluxe Edition – (Wisin & Yandel)
- 2006 Mas Flow: Los Benjamins – (Luny Tunes & Tainy)
- 2006 Boy Wonder – Chosen Few: El documental II
- 2007 La Reunión – (Yaga & Mackie)
- 2007 The Perfect Melody – (Zion)
- 2007 It's My Time – (Tito El Bambino)
- 2007 El Pentágono
- 2007 El Cartel: The Big Boss – (Daddy Yankee)
- 2007 The Black Carpet – (Nicky Jam)
- 2007 Broke and Famous – (Ñejo & Dalmata)
- 2008 Showtime – (Angel & Khriz)
- 2008 Lo Mejor De Mi – (Jadiel)
- 2008 Masacre Musical – (De La Ghetto)
- 2008 El Fenómeno – (Arcángel)
- 2009 Down To Earth – (Alexis & Fido)
- 2009 Free Tempo – (Tempo)
- 2009 The Black Frequency – (Los Yetzons)
- 2009 Música Para Adultos 18+ – (Luigi 21 Plus)
- 2010 House of Pleasure – (Plan B)
- 2010 El Bokisucio – (Luigi 21 Plus)
- 2011 Perreologia – (Alexis & Fido)
- 2011 Formula, Vol. 1 (Romeo Santos)
- 2012 El Patán – Luigi 21 Plus
- 2013 De Líder a Leyenda – Yandel
- 2013 Sentimiento, Elegancia & Maldad – Arcángel
- 2014 Love and Sex – Plan B
- 2015 Matando La Liga – (Jory Boy)
- 2017 Golden – Romeo Santos
- 2021 Warm Up – Bad Gyal
