= The Kings of the Beats =

Compilation album by Luny Tunes
- Released: November 23, 2004
- Genre: Reggaeton
- Label: Mas Flow Inc
- Producer: Luny Tunes

Luny Tunes chronology
Mas Flow (2003)	The Kings of the Beats (2004)	La Trayectoria (2004)

The Kings of the Beats is an album by Luny Tunes to showcase their production mastery. The two-disc, 43-track album rounds up instrumental versions of many of the duo's most popular work, along with other production shorts exclusive to this album. It was nominated for Latin Grammy Award for Best Urban Music Album at the 2005 award ceremony.

== Track listing ==
Disc 1

1. "Introduction" (2:10) LUNY TUMES
2. "Rap: Beat" (3:52)
3. "Reggaeton: Beat 1" (2:34)
4. "Reggaeton: Beat 2" (2:27)
5. "Reggaeton: Beat 3" (2:32)
6. "Reggaeton: Beat 4" (2:27)
7. "Merengue Beat" (2:32)
8. "Bachata: Beat" (3:35)
9. "Reggaeton: Beat 5" (3:03)
10. "Bolero: Beat" (2:59)- Baby Ranks
11. "Reggaeton: Beat 6" (2:55)
12. "Agárrala: Beat" (4:25)- Don Omar, Hector "El Father", & Trebol Clan
13. "Valla: Beat" (2:32)
14. "No Le Temas a Él: Beat" (3:35)- Trebol Clan, Hector & Tito
15. "Ho He Ho He: Beat" (3:21) Joan & O'Neill
16. "Te Buscaré: Beat" (2:39)- Tito "El Bambino"
17. "Zion & Lennox Concert Jingle: Beat" (3:03)- Zion & Lennox
18. "Gasolina: Beat" (3:16)- Daddy Yankee
19. "Amor: Beat" (3:20)- Baby Ranks
20. "Bumper: Beat" (3:33)- Julio Voltio
21. "Tú Quieres Duro: Beat" (3:31)- Hector "El Father"
22. "Noche de Travesura: Beat" (3:30)- Hector "El Father" & Divino
23. "Tu Príncipe: Beat" (3:25)- Daddy Yankee, Zion & Lennox

Disc 2

1. "La Calle Lo Pidió: Beat" yandel

(3:05)- Yandel & Tego Calderón

1. "Rolo: Beat" (2:43)- Alexis & Fido
2. "Al Natural: Beat" (2:15)- Tego Calderón
3. "Amor de Colegio: Beat" (3:30)- Don Omar, Hector & Tito
4. "Te Entregas a Mí: Beat" (3:19)- Baby Rasta & Gringo
5. "Baila Morena: Beat" (3:15)- Hector & Tito, Don Omar
6. "Santífica: Beat" (3:25)- Daddy Yankee
7. "Entre Tú y Yo: Beat" (3:07)- Don Omar
8. "Sin Jockey: Beat" (3:16)- Daddy Yankee
9. "Cae La Noche: Beat" (3:12) Don Omar
10. "Say Ho: Beat" (3:12)- Wisin & Yandel
11. "Toda la Noche: Beat" (2:45)
12. "Mambo Duro: Beat" (3:39)- Tego Calderón
13. "Tú Piensas en Mí: Beat" (1:56)- Eddie Dee & Daddy Yankee
14. "Aunque Me Tiren: Beat" (3:30)- Julio Voltio & Tego Calderón
15. "Tu Cuerpo: Beat" (2:27)- Yandel
16. "Búscame: Beat" (2:25)- Yandel
17. "Vamos Perro: Beat" (3:01)- Angel & Khriz
18. "Ven a Bailar: Beat" (2:31)- Angel Doze
19. "Noche y Pelea: Beat" (2:49)- Wisin
