= Mas Flow =

Mas Flow may refer to:

- Mas Flow (album), an album by Luny Tunes
- Mas Flow Inc., a record label founded by Luny Tunes
