= The Kings of the Beats 2 =

Compilation album by Luny Tunes
- Released: December 19, 2006
- Genre: Reggaeton
- Label: Mas Flow Inc
- Producer: Luny Tunes

Luny Tunes chronology
Mas Flow: Los Benjamins (2006)	The Kings of the Beats 2 (2006)	20 #1's Now (2007)

The Kings of the Beats 2 is an album by Luny Tunes showcasing many of their greatest beats to date. Most of the beats were based on songs from their albums Mas Flow: Los Benjamins, Mas Flow 2, and Mas Flow 2.5.

== Track listing ==
1. "Fantasma" (3:53)
2. "Hello" (3:28)
3. "Beautiful" (3:01)
4. "Noche de Entierro" (4:07)
5. "Mi Fanática" (4:00)
6. "Alócate" (3:06)
7. "Mayor Que Yo, Pt. 1" (4:42)
8. "Mayor Que Yo, Pt. 2" (3:57)
9. "Rakata" (2:52)
10. "Te He Querido, Te He Llorado" (4:15)
11. "Yo Quiero" (2:44)
12. "Ponla Ahi" (3:50)
13. "Mírame" (3:53)
14. "Slow Motion" (3:19)
15. "Royal Rumble" (6:17)
16. "Piden Reggaeton" (3:10)
17. "Hay de Sobra" (2:53)
18. "Entrégate" (3:46)
19. "De Ti Me Enamoré" (3:23)
20. "Clak Clak" (3:25)
