= Todo a Su Tiempo =

Todo A Su Tiempo may refer to:

- Todo a Su Tiempo (Marc Anthony album), salsa album released in 1995
- Todo a Su Tiempo (Divino album), reggaeton album released in 2004, or the 2006 platinum edition
