= Todo a Su Tiempo (Divino album) =

Studio album by Divino
- Released: August 2, 2004
- Recorded: 2003–2004
- Genre: Reggaeton
- Length: Machete Music
- Producer: Luny Tunes; Noriega; Eliel; Echo; DJ Blass

Divino chronology
Todo a Su Tiempo (2004)	Todo a Su Tiempo (Platinum Edition) (2006)

Todo a Su Tiempo (Platinum Edition)

Studio album by Divino
- Released: August 2, 2006
- Genre: Reggaeton
- Length: Machete Music
- Producer: Luny Tunes; Nely "El Arma Secreta"; Santana; Eliel; Echo

Divino chronology
Todo a Su Tiempo (2004)	Todo a Su Tiempo (Platinum Edition) (2006)	Por Experiencia Propia (2010)

Todo a Su Tiempo is the debut album by Divino. It contains many hits such as Se Activaron Los Anormales, Super Gangsteril, Te vas, Tres perros, and Una lágrima.

== Track listing ==
#	Title	Featured Guest	Producer(s)
1	"Intro"		Noriega
2	"Ya Estoy Llegando"		Gocho & Luny Tunes
3	"Se Activaron Los Anormales"	Daddy Yankee	Luny Tunes
4	"Hoy Te Vas"		Eliel
5	"Dale Hasta Abajo"	Baby Ranks	DJ Blass
6	"Super Gangsteril"	Polaco	Luny Tunes
7	"Sola"		DJ Blass & Noriega
8	"Tres Perros"	Angel & Khriz	Luny Tunes
9	"Una Lagrima"		Eliel
10	"Sudar, Perrear Mix"		DJ Blass
11	"Bien Suelto"		Luny Tunes & Eliel
12	"Dime"		Baby Ranks, Luny Tunes
13	"Mi Nena"		Echo
14	"Dile Mar"		Rafi Torres

=== Platinum edition ===
#	Title	Featured Guest	Producer(s)	Length
1	"Intro"		Noriega	
2	"Para Donde Voy"		Santana	
3	"Noche de Travesura"	Héctor el Father	Nely	
4	"Simple Bandolero"		Nely	
5	"Se Activaron Los Anormales"	Daddy Yankee	Luny Tunes	
6	"Llégale"		Nely	
7	"Amor de una Noche"	Gocho	Santana	
8	"Ya Estoy Llegando"		Luny Tunes	
9	"Una Lágrima"		Eliel	
10	"Tres Perros"	Angel & Khriz	Luny Tunes	
11	"Hoy Te Vas"		Eliel	
12	"Super Gangsteril"	Polaco	Luny Tunes	
13	"Mi Nena (R&B)"		Echo	
14	"Dile Mar"		Rafi Torres	

== Charts ==
Chart (2004)	Peak position
US Top Latin Albums (Billboard)	68
US Tropical Albums (Billboard)	8
