= Doble A & Nales =

Doble A & Nales "Los Presidentes"
- Genre: Reggaeton
- Years active: 2004–present
- Labels: Mas Flow Inc., Rotari Music, Wild Dogz Music
- Members: Aaron Pena (Doble A); Anthony Calo Cotto (Nales)

Aaron Pena, also known as Doble A, was born in the Dominican Republic, but raised in Boston, Massachusetts.

Anthony Calo Cotto, or Nales, was born and raised in Virginia, U.S., before moving to Puerto Rico at age 15. Doble A & Nales, both from the Mas Flow production team, form the producing duo Los Presidentes.

== Doble A's musical career ==
Doble A has been working with Luny and Tunes before their move to Puerto Rico. Back then the reggaeton scene in Lynn "City of Sin" (the city from where he is from) was small, but very rich in talent. Doble A has known Luny from way back when the reggaeton movement was hardcore in Puerto Rico, and it is still going strong. A lot of them were trying to make reggaeton music, rap or had groups; so they had their own movement back then. They even had competitions against one another.

One of the most profound events in the reggaeton movement of Massachusetts was Luny and Tunes’ choice to relocate to Puerto Rico. Those who stayed behind continued with their own lives, including Doble A. When Luny and Tunes moved from Massachusetts, Doble A kept on doing his own things. He stepped away for 5 years to take care of personal stuff, and even had a child before he came back to work with his music again. Even though he was with Luny and Tunes before they left, he followed a slightly different path to get here. Over the years he kept in touch with Luny; however he felt it was just not meant to be for him at that time. The path he took brought him work with N.O.R.E. and SPK, and Doble A is even part of N.O.R.E.’s most recent production.

Doble A Corliones produced at least 4 or 5 tracks intended for "Los Benjamins", alongside co-worker and production partner "Nales". However Doble A has stated that just because you do a track for an album doesn't mean that it will automatically be included. Many of the songs presented to Luny for "Los Benjamins" were not chosen for this instance of "Los Benjamins." Fans are optimistic that Luny will release even more hits by reggaeton artists like Tego Calderón and Daddy Yankee. No matter what, fans are looking forward to whatever creativity Doble A brings to reggaeton. His work has been featured on Hector El Father's single "Here we Go Yo" feat. Jay-Z from the album Los Rompe Discotekas, where he and his co-producing partner, "Nales", worked for the first time together, later becoming the producing duo better known as "Los Presidentes".

== Nales musical career ==
Nales can be heard singing in the halls of the Mas Flow studios in addition to the production work he does.

The nickname (Nales) is derived from the word knowledge. People in Puerto Rico have problems pronouncing the word ‘knowledge,’ so he found a way to spell it so that they can easily enunciate it when it's read. Tito "El Bambino" pronounced it a certain way on ‘Caile’ and that is the way it has stayed.

He was about 12 years old and Nales used to rap and write lyrics. He didn't really like the quality of beats he used to buy at a barbershop, and that is when he started getting interested in producing himself. He bought a keyboard and he just started to learn how to play it. He was in a band class and he played the trumpet so he was very familiar with music and how it's read and composed, and went from there. Nales was raised listening to Hip-Hop, Salsa and Merengue, so he gets his inspiration from different kinds of music.

When he was 15 years old, his father brought him to Puerto Rico and like any parent, he wanted Nales to continue with school. However, he found another path. At first he missed Virginia so much, that one time he ran away from home and headed back to Virginia. He wanted to see if he could collaborate with someone over there. Now at the age of 19 he is content with his life in Puerto Rico and gets his education at the Mas Flow Studios.

Nales's connection with Luny Tunes is a whole different story. He used to work with another producer, and he told him he knew Luny and Tunes from way back. He wanted to present him as a singer, not as a producer. So the first time Nales met Luny he sang three songs as part of the auditioning process. Luny told him to come back the next day to sign a contract. The next day Nales came back with a CD with some of his beats on it. Luny was surprised to find a guy who could both sing and produce too. That day Nales presented Luny with beats from both himself and beats produced by him and his partner at the time. Nales was convinced that the beats he made with his partner were much better than the ones he did alone. But looking back, Nales now realizes he produced better quality material on his own; all he needed was someone to confirm his talent, and Luny gave him that validation. When Nales first had the chance to sign with Mas Flow, he was 18, and the age to sign that particular contract was 21. Nales' father refused to sign the contract with him because he felt Nales was too young. But eventually Luny provided Nales with a new contract.

Nales has stated that he would love to work with artists like Usher and Timbaland. He's more interested in working on the producing side of things. Nales has already worked with Wisin & Yandel and produced Mayor Que Yo Part 2 alongside Luny Tunes. He has also worked with Don Omar, Bimbo and Eliel. More recently, he was a major part of the producing effort for Luny Tunes & Tainy's album 'Los Benjamins', being a co-producer of the first single 'Noche de Entierro (Nuestro Amor)' His accomplishments in such a short time in the reggaeton scene just fuel his aspirations for the future.

== Production discography ==
- 2005 Pa'l Mundo (Wisin & Yandel)
- 2006 Top of the Line (Tito "El Bambino")
- 2006 Los Rompe Discotekas (Hector "El Father") (RocNation)
- 2006 Mas Flow: Los Benjamins (Luny Tunes & Tainy)
- 2006 Los Bandoleros Reloaded (Don Omar)
- 2007 El Pentágono (Don Omar)
- 2007 Top of the Line: El Internacional (Tito "El Bambino")
- 2007 Progresivo (Magnate)
- 2007 Sobrenatural (Alexis & Fido)
- 2007 Da Street Album (High Rollers Family)
- 2008 Lo Mejor De Mi (Jadiel album)
- 2009 Down To Earth (Alexis & Fido)
- 2009 The Black Frequency – Los Yetzons
