= Wibal & Alex =

Puerto Rican reggaeton duo

- Origin: Comerío, Puerto Rico
- Genres: Reggaeton
- Years active: 2002-present
- Labels: Machete, Universal, Montano Music, Fresh Productions
- Members: Wibal; Alex

Wibal & Alex are a Puerto Rican reggaeton duo, consisting of José Rivera (Wibal) and José Díaz (Alex). The song "La Nena del Caserío" is one of the best known of the duet.

== Early years ==
José A. Díaz (ALEX) was born in Bayamon on February 20, 1983, and Joseph A. Rivera (Wibal) was born in Comerío on February 5, 1980. They have known each other since childhood, Alex discovered a Wibal and so formed the duo of Wibal & Alex - Los Dueños Del Bandidaje thus to be able to realize their dreams to succeed in the competitive world of reggaeton. Alex has been writing songs and singing since age 13 and Wibal since age 20.

== Career ==
After their debut in Sangre Nueva, they released their first album entitled El Repertorio by Universal Music and Montano Music. Said musical proposal sold around 30 thousand copies, in a pre-sale made by Universal Music Latino together with Montano Music through the Internet, prior to its official launch.

Their success in sales is largely due to the versatility, improvisation and fusions contained in their album. Although the album includes songs that have already appeared in other reggaeton productions, it combines the rhythms and lyrics of new songs. In the record production there are fusions of reggaeton with R&B, bachata and merengue. In addition to a DVD with five videos of the songs "Gata Psycho", "Presión", "La baya", "Fantasia" and "Hasta que sal el sol".

Producers Urba & Monserrate, Luny Tunes, Naldo, Gómez, Tilo, AA & Nales, Brain, Nesty, Lex, Nelly, Mambo Kings, Bounce, among others, were in charge of the music.

The duo released two singles from a project titled Reggaeton VS Trap Sonido Mundial, a unique concept where the members would release two songs, one in Reggaeton and the other in trap, and they would be competing with each other.

In 2018, they summoned their fans to choose their new promotional theme. Between "Bailar Reggaeton" and "Especial", the binomial was taking the consideration of "Especial".

== Discography ==
=== Studio albums ===
- 2009: Los Bionikos
- 2012: World Edition

=== Compilation albums ===
- 2007: El Repertorio

=== Compilation Albums Appeared On ===
- 2004: Flow la Discoteka
- 2004: La Trayectoria
- 2004: Luny Tunes Presents La Mision 4: The Take Over
- 2005: Sangre Nueva
- 2005: Da' Music Reloaded
- 2005: Mas Flow 2
- 2006: Gargolas 5
- 2006: Reggaeton Hits
- 2006: Roots of Reggaeton: El Que Habla Con Las Manos
- 2006: Reggaeton Ignition Vol. 1: El Comienzo
- 2007: La Iglesia de la Calle
- 2007: El Pentágono
- 2009: El Dúo de la Historia Vol. 1

=== Singles ===
- "Quieren Madrugarme"
- "Saca Las Garras"
- "Flaquiastes"
- "Dame La Verda"
- "Entregate"
- "La Nena"
- "Te Vi Llegar"
- "Te Digo Adios"
- "Gata Psycho"
- "Una Foto"
- "Chica Gargola"
- "Presión"
- "Agitala"
- "Hace Tiempo"
- "La Valla"
- "Tu No Puedes Comprender"
- "Brusca"
- "Hasta Que Salga El Sol"
- "Me Activo"
- "Agitalas"
- "Solo Te Pregunto"
- "Por Ley"
- "Ando En Una Nota"
- "Humildad Prevalece
- "Especial"
- "Vamonos" ft J Alvarez
- "Vamonos (Official Remix)" ft Yaniel & Kenoby
- "Nunca te vayas" ft. Jadiel
