= Reggaeton Hits =

2006 compilation album by Luny Tunes

Compilation album by Luny Tunes
- Released: March 14, 2006
- Genre: Reggaeton
- Language: Spanish
- Label: Mas Flow
- Producer: Luny Tunes

Luny Tunes chronology
Mas Flow 2 (2005)	Reggaeton Hits (2006)	Mas Flow: Los Benjamins (2006)

Reggaeton Hits features 15 previously released Luny Tunes productions performed by various reggaeton artists such as Daddy Yankee and Tego Calderón. The 15 inclusions are among the best work the hitmakers had accomplished to date.

== Track listing ==
1. "Hay de Sobra" (by Yo-Seph "The One") - 2:35
2. "Bum, Bye" (by Angel Doze) - 2:48
3. "Cojela Que Va Sin Jockey" (by Daddy Yankee) - 2:52
4. "Mayor Que Yo 2" (by Wisin & Yandel) - 3:21
5. "Noche de Travesura" (by Héctor el Father ft. Divino) - 3:25
6. "Te Encontraré" (by Tito El Bambino) - 2:38
7. "Mía Completa" (by Zion & Lennox) - 3:04
8. "Te He Querido, Te He Llorado" (by Ivy Queen) - 3:17
9. "Tortura" (by Yaga & Mackie) - 3:18
10. "Yo Voy a Llegar" (by Zion) - 3:17
11. "Entre Tú y Yo (remix)" (by Don Omar) - 2:31
12. "Métele Sazón" (by Tego Calderón) - 3:12
13. "Tus Ojos" (by Nicky Jam) - 3:22
14. "Hace Tiempo" (by Wibal & Alex) - 2:45
15. "Lo Mío" (by Yo-Seph "The One") - 2:56

== Charts ==
Chart (2006)	Peak position
US Top Latin Albums (Billboard)	15
US Latin Rhythm Albums (Billboard)	6
