= Mas Flow Inc. =

Puerto Rican record label

- Parent company: Universal Music Group
- Founded: 2004; 22 years ago
- Founder: Luny Tunes
- Distributor: Machete Music
- Genre: Reggaeton
- Country of origin: Puerto Rico

Mas Flow Incorporated is a record label founded by Luny Tunes, a Dominican reggaeton production duo. It claims to be among the companies that helped expand the reggaeton genre beyond its limits. Mas Flow has many connections to the East Coast; in fact most of their producing teams come from Massachusetts in the US. Its primary headquarters is in Carolina, Puerto Rico. It has a regional office in New Jersey and Boston, Massachusetts and Rochester, New York.

For their album Mas Flow 3, announced in 2015, they produced the single "Mayor Que Yo 3", which brought together Wisin & Yandel, Don Omar and Daddy Yankee for the first time.

== Roster ==
=== Producers ===
- Luny Tunes
- Tainy
- Nely "El Arma Secreta"
- Nesty "La Mente Maestra"
- Bones
- Thilo
- Miki "La Mano Bionica"
- Doble A & Nales
- DJ Coffee
- Underage
- Naldo
- Handyman

=== Artists ===
- Ashanti Baeza
- Dyland & Lenny
- El Roockie
- Yo-Seph
- Emmanuel Vélez
- Ektor

=== Affiliated artists ===
Artists who are affiliated with this label include:

- Daddy Yankee
- Wisin & Yandel
- Don Omar
- Ivy Queen
- De La Ghetto
- Arcángel
- Plan B

=== Affiliated producers ===
- Ashanti Baeza
- Nely "El Arma Secreta"
- Naldo

== Albums released by Mas Flow Inc. ==
2003

- Mas Flow

2004

- The Kings of the Beats
- La Trayectoria
- Luny Tunes Presents: La Mision 4: The Take Over

2005

- Mas Flow 2

2006

- Reggaeton Hits
- Mas Flow 2.5
- Mas Flow: Los Benjamins
- The Kings of the Beats 2

2007

- Los Benjamins: La Continuación

2008

- Semblante Urbano
- Luny Tunes Presents: Erre XI
- El Fenómeno

In The Future

- Mas Flow 3

== See also ==
- List of record labels
- Universal Music Group
- Machete Music
- Luny Tunes production discography
- Noriega production discography
