= Mayor Que Yo =

2005 single by Luny Tunes and others

Single by Luny Tunes, Baby Ranks, Daddy Yankee, Tony Tun Tun, Wisin & Yandel and Héctor el Father

from the album Mas Flow 2
- Released: February 8, 2005
- Genre: Reggaeton, bachata
- Length: 4:08
- Label: Machete; Mas Flow
- Songwriter: Gabriel Cruz
- Producer: Luny Tunes

Luny Tunes singles chronology
"Mayor Que Yo" (2005)	"Noche de Entierro" (2006)

"Mayor Que Yo" (English: "Older Than Me") is a bachatón song by Luny Tunes, Baby Ranks, Daddy Yankee, Tony Tun Tun, Wisin & Yandel and Héctor el Father, from the collaborative album Mas Flow 2 (2005). The song reached number three on the Tropical Airplay charr, number three on the Hot Latin Songs chart and number 11 on the Latin Pop Airplay chart.

== Music video ==
Héctor el Father does not appear on the video because of his explicit lyrics. Luny from the production duo makes a cameo appearance at the end of the video.

== Other versions ==
=== Different versions ===
- "Mayor Que Yo" (Blended Mix 1) – a slightly different beat with Don Omar and Zion chorus's.
- "Mayor Que Yo" (Blended Mix 2) – same as the first mix but with a different beat.
- "Mayor Que Yo" (Remix) – nearly identical to the promo version, but mixed with the blended mix.
- "Mayor Que Yo" (Video version) – the version used in the video.
- "Mayor Que Yo" (Mas Flow 2.5 version) – the remastered version of the original, featuring a slightly different beat and the explicit lyrics of Hector's verse edited out in a manner similar to the music video.

=== Remixes ===
- "Mayor Que Yo" (Aventura Remix) – lyrics added by Romeo Santos, R&B-bachata group Aventura and Baby Ranks.
- "Mayor Que Yo" (Pina Records Remix) – new verses sung by Baby Ranks, R.K.M & Ken-Y, La India, Nicky Jam and Carlitos Way.
- "Mayor Que Yo" (Mas Flow Remix) – new lyrics sung by Baby Ranks, Don Omar, Alexis & Fido and Zion.
- "Mayor Que Yo" (Mas Flow 2 Promo Remix) – a new chorus is sung by Zion with the new promotional instrumental in the background.
- "Mayor Que Yo" (Virus & Shorty Remix) – by Power98FM, lyrics added by Virus & Shorty, replacing the verse sung by Héctor el Father.
- "Mayor Que Yo" (DJ Evolution Dembow Beat Remix) – it is the original song with a newer dembow beat over it.
- "Mayor Que Yo" (DJ Koby Remix) – all new version sung by various artists.
- "Mayor Que Yo" (Ñengo Flow Remix) – new verses all sung by Ñengo Flow.
- "Mayor Que Yo" (Extended Remix) – a mix of the original "Mayor Que Yo", the Mas Flow remix, and the DJ Koby remix.

=== Sequels ===
- "Mayor Que Yo 2" – sequel to the original; featured in Wisin & Yandel's Pa'l Mundo.
- "Mayor Que Yo 2" (Remix) – the remix to the sequel to the original; sung by Wisin & Yandel, Franco El Gorila, and Tony Dize; featured in Pa'l Mundo: Deluxe Edition.
- "Noche de Entierro (Nuestro Amor)" – also considered a sequel to "Mayor Que Yo"; sung by Daddy Yankee, Héctor el Father, Wisin & Yandel, Zion, and Tony Tun Tun.
- "Menor Que Yo" – considered the "answer" to the song; sung by Ivy Queen, featured on the platinum edition of Sentmiento.
- "Mayor Que Yo 3" – sequel to the original; released as the first promotional single for the upcoming album Mas Flow 3, performed by Don Omar, Wisin, Yandel and Daddy Yankee. This version received a nomination for Urban Collaboration of the Year in 2017.
- "Mayor Que Yo 3" (Remix) – a leaked alternate version of part three, with Don Omar, Wisin, Yandel, Prince Royce and Nicky Jam, omitting Daddy Yankee's verse. This version is thought to have been the original before Daddy Yankee was added.
- "Mayor Que Yo" (New Generation) – a reimagining of the original, performed by new-school reggaeton artists and using the beat from part 3. This version is incomplete, only featuring Farruko, Arcángel, Alexio La Bestia and Ozuna. J Balvin and Kevin Roldan were also said to have been featured, but Roldan's verse is missing while Balvin only appears in the intro. This version was abandoned by Luny Tunes after it leaked.
- "Mayor Que Usted" – Natti Natasha, Daddy Yankee and Wisin & Yandel

== Chart positions ==
Chart (2005–06)	Peak position
U.S. Billboard Hot Ringtones	16
U.S. Billboard Hot Latin Songs	5
U.S. Billboard Latin Tropical Airplay	1
U.S. Billboard Latin Rhythm Airplay	2
U.S. Billboard Bubbling Under Hot 100	11

=== All-time charts ===
Chart (2021)	Position
US Hot Latin Songs (Billboard)	50

== Michael Stuart version ==
"Mayor Que Yo"

Single by Michael Stuart

from the album Back to da Barrio
- Released: 2006
- Recorded: 2006
- Genre: Salsa
- Length: 4:24
- Songwriter: Gabriel Cruz

Michael Stuart singles chronology
"Ella y Yo" (2006)	"Mayor Que Yo" (2006)	"Paga Lo Que Debes" (2006)

"Mayor Que Yo" was covered by Michael Stuart from his 2006 album, Back to da Barrio, which was recorded in salsa.

=== Chart performance ===
Year	Chart	Single	Peak
2006	Billboard Latin Tropical Airplay	"Mayor Que Yo"	15
