= Full Records =

- Founded: 2008-2013
- Founder: Yaga & Mackie
- Genre: Reggaeton
- Country of origin: Puerto Rico

Full Records was a reggaeton record label located in Bayamón, Puerto Rico. It was owned by Yaga & Mackie.

Notable artists on this label are Yaga & Mackie, Arcángel, Ñengo Flow, L.T. "El Único," Dvice and Tony Tone. Full Records has a reality show on YouTube.

== Producers ==
- "El Pequeño" Yampi
- Shadow "La Sombra"
- Sequence
- Nixon "El Astronauta"

== Sound Engineers ==
- Sequence

== Featured albums and projects ==
- Los Mackieavelikos (2008) - Yaga & Mackie
- Real G4 Life (2011) - Ñengo Flow
- Los Mackieavelikos HD (2012) - Yaga & Mackie
- Real G4 Life 2 (2012) (2012 - Ñengo Flow
- Armados & Peligrosos (2009) Compilation album
