= Mi Flow: This Is It =

Studio album by Baby Ranks
- Released: August 19, 2008
- Recorded: 2007–2008
- Genre: Reggaeton
- Label: Star Dome Latino
- Producer: Luny Tunes; Predikador; Mambo Kingz

Baby Ranks chronology
Mas Flow 2 (2005)	Mi Flow: This Is It (2008)

Singles from Mi Flow: This Is It
- 1. "De Fuga" Released: August 2008

Mi Flow: This Is It is the debut studio album by reggaeton singer Baby Ranks released on August 19, 2008.

== Track listing ==
1. Intro
2. El Amor Se Fue - (featuring Angel Lopez) (Predikador)
3. Suave (Luny Tunes & Predikador)
4. Bailando
5. Fire - (featuring Erick Right)
6. Luna Llena - (featuring La India) (Scarlito)
7. Noche De Carnaval (Predikador & Natural)
8. Detras De Ti (Tunes)
9. Confundido Estoy - (featuring Divino)
10. Tell Me Why (Luny Tunes)
11. Sin Ti - (featuring India) Fred Tovar Chirivella (Guitarra Acústica)
1. Enamorado De Ti
2. Noche De Perreo (Natural)
3. Sera La Hora - (featuring Bori)
4. De Fuga (Thilo 'La Navaja De Doble Filo')
5. Estan Llegando (Mambo Kingz)

== Chart performance ==
Chart (2008)	Peak position
U.S. Billboard Latin Rhythm Albums	10
