= Los Bacatranes =

2004 studio album by Trébol Clan

Studio album by Trébol Clan
- Released: June 29, 2004
- Genre: Reggaeton
- Length: 1:00:28
- Label: Gold Star; Universal Latino
- Producer: DJ Joe; DJ Fat; Luny Tunes; Nely el Arma Secreta; Mr. G

Trébol Clan chronology
| Los Genios Musicales (2000) | Los Bacatranes (2004) | The Comeback (2008) |

Singles from Los Bacatranes
- 1. "No Le Temas A Él" Released: 2004; 2. "Amor Prohibido" Released: 2004; 3. "Hoy Vamos a Ver" Released: 2004; 4. "Corre y Píllala" Released: 2005; 5. "Gata Fiera" Released: 2005

Los Bacatranes is the debut album by Trébol Clan. It was released on June 29, 2004.

== Track listing ==
| # | Title | Featuring | Producer(s) |
|---|---|---|---|
| 1 | Hoy Vamos a Ver | Polaco | DJ Joe & DJ Fat |
| 2 | Amor Prohibido | | DJ Joe & DJ Fat |
| 3 | Agárrala | Héctor el Father & Don Omar | Luny Tunes & Nely |
| 4 | No Le Temas a Él | Héctor & Tito | Luny Tunes |
| 5 | Cuando Te Vallas Tú | | DJ Joe & DJ Fat |
| 6 | Corre y Píllala | Héctor el Father & Jomar | Luny Tunes & Nely |
| 7 | ¿Dónde Están? | Héctor el Father | DJ Joe & DJ Fat & Luny Tunes |
| 8 | No Sabes | | DJ Joe & DJ Fat |
| 9 | Gata Fiera | Héctor el Father & Joan | Luny Tunes & Mr. G |
| 10 | Pa' la Calle Voy | Alexis & Fido | DJ Joe & DJ Fat |
| 11 | Mi Vida | Gavilán | DJ Joe & DJ Fat & Luny Tunes |
| 12 | La Nueva | | DJ Joe & DJ Fat |
| 13 | Me Mata | Jomar | DJ Joe & DJ Fat |
| 14 | Bailarina | | DJ Joe & DJ Fat |
| 15 | Mi Gorda Bella | | DJ Joe & DJ Fat |
| 16 | Perdóname | | DJ Joe & DJ Fat |
| 17 | Agárrala (remix) | | DJ Joe & DJ Fat |
| 18 | Los Caseríos | | DJ Joe & DJ Fat |
