= Erre XI =

Puerto Rican reggaetón duo

- Origin: Puerto Rico
- Genres: Reggaeton, hip hop, R&B
- Years active: 2007-2009, 2016-2018
- Labels: Machete Music; 2007-2009 Mas Flow Inc. 2016-2018 Showman Music
- Past members: Gerry Capó Hernández (Lionize); Rafael Flores Ramírez (Raphy)

Erre XI were a Puerto Rican reggaetón duo. They were signed with Luny Tunes Mas Flow Inc. label. Composed of Gerry "Lionize" Capó Hernández and Rafael "Raphy" Flores Ramírez, the duo made its recording debut in 2007 on the Luny Tunes album Los Benjamins: La Continuación with the song "Vete". In 2008 the duo released their full-length debut album titled Luny Tunes Presents: Erre XI which spawned the single "Carita Bonita" featuring Pee Wee of Kumbia All Starz. The album was largely produced by Luny Tunes.

In August 2009, Lionize announced the break-up of the duo with Luny Tunes. Luny will keep the name 'Erre XI', but both Lionize and Raphy will be replaced by two other members. It is currently unknown if Lionize and El Raffe will continue to be a duo, or if both artists will pursue their solo-careers. As for the reasoning of the separation, a statement has yet to be given.

Recently Lionize has started his solo career as Gerry Capo and Raphy has been using his name Raphy Flores, and it was announced that Dyland & Lenny were the replacements of Erre XI but they did not want to take the name away from the original artists. On June 29, 2016, they announced their comeback after 7 years separated. In 2018, they break up again, Raphy decided to return to choreographies, and Gerry decided to continue with his solo career

== Discography ==
- 2008: Urban Soul
- 2008: Luny Tunes Presents: Erre XI
- 2010: Errevolucion
- 2018: The Last Call
