= Luny Tunes Presents: Erre XI =

Studio album by Erre XI
- Released: August 12, 2008
- Recorded: 2007–2008
- Genres: Reggaeton; bachata; cumbia
- Labels: Machete; Mas Flow Inc.
- Producers: Luny Tunes; Noriega; Predikador; Mambo Kingz; Tainy; Ivy Queen; Scarlito; DJ Dicky; Nales

Erre XI chronology
Luny Tunes Presents: Erre XI (2008)	ErreVolution XI (2009)

Singles from Luny Tunes Presents: Erre XI
- 1. "Carita Bonita" Released: February 19, 2008; 2. "Al Desnudo" Released: November 2008

Luny Tunes Presents: Erre XI is the debut studio album by reggaeton duo Erre XI, released on August 12, 2008 by Machete Music. The album includes contributions by Zion & Lennox, Alexis from the duo Alexis & Fido, La Sista, Guelo Star and former Kumbia All Starz member Pee Wee. The album was heavily produced by Luny Tunes. The first single from the album is "Carita Bonita".

== Track listing ==
1. "Carita Bonita" (featuring Pee Wee) (Luny Tunes, Way Fell & Noriega) - 4:13
2. "Al Desnudo"^{1} (Luny Tunes, Nales & Predicador) - 3:10
3. "La Carta" (Luny Tunes & Noriega) - 3:07
4. "Invisible" (featuring Zion & Lennox) (Luny Tunes, Noriega & Predicador) - 4:12
5. "MSN" (Luny Tunes & Mambo Kingz) - 3:06
6. "Febrero 14"^{2} (Luny Tunes, Noriega, Ivy Queen & Tainy) - 3:26
7. "Lloraré" (Bachata) (featuring Alexis) (Luny Tunes) - 4:09
8. "Ella Me Amó" (Bachata) (Luny Tunes, Tone & Jery) - 3:42
9. "Te Hice Volar" (featuring La Sista) (Luny Tunes Thilo & Predicador) - 3:50
10. "Te Abrazaré" (Scarlito & Thilo) - 3:44
11. "Castigo" (featuring Guelo Star) (Luny Tunes & Noriega) - 2:54
12. "Lloraré" (Balada) (Luny Tunes) - 4:23
13. "Dímelo" (Luny Tunes & DJ Dicky) - 3:02
14. "Carita Bonita" (Trance Version) (featuring Pee Wee) (Luny Tunes, Way Fell & Noriega) - 3:04

^{1}Track #2 includes additional vocals by Tito El Bambino. ^{2}Track #6 included additional composition by Ivy Queen.

== Chart performance ==
Chart (2008)	Peak position
U.S. Billboard Top Latin Albums	38
U.S. Billboard Top Heatseekers	49
U.S. Billboard Latin Rhythm Albums	5
