= Noche de Entierro (Nuestro Amor) =

2006 single by Luny Tunes featuring multiple artists

Single by Luny Tunes, Tainy, Daddy Yankee, Wisin & Yandel, Zion, Héctor el Father and Tony Tun Tun

from the album Mas Flow: Los Benjamins
- Released: October 2006
- Recorded: August 2006
- Genre: Reggaeton
- Length: 4:23
- Label: Machete; Mas Flow
- Songwriter(s): Gabriel Antonio Cruz Padilla
- Producer(s): Luny Tunes; Tainy; Doble A & Nales

Luny Tunes singles chronology
"Mayor Que Yo" (2005)	"Noche de Entierro" (2006)	"Royal Rumble (Se Van)" (2006)

Daddy Yankee singles chronology
"Machucando" (2006)	"Noche de Entierro" (2006)	"El Truco" (2006)

Wisin & Yandel singles chronology
"El Teléfono" (2006)	"Noche de Entierro" (2006)	"Pegao" (2006)

Héctor el Father singles chronology
"El Teléfono" (2006)	"Noche de Entierro" (2006)	"Sola" (2006)

Tony Tun Tun singles chronology
"Mayor Que Yo" (2005)	"Noche de Entierro" (2006)

"Noche de Entierro (Nuestro Amor)" (English: "Night to Bury (Our Love)") is a reggaeton song performed by artists Daddy Yankee, Wisin & Yandel, Zion, Héctor el Father and Tony Tun Tun. It was produced by Luny Tunes, Tainy and Doble A & Nales and written by Gabriel Padilla. The track was featured in Mas Flow: Los Benjamins and is one of the most successful songs in the history of the genre. It is usually seen as a sequel to "Mayor Que Yo". "Noche de Entierro (Nuestro Amor)" features music instruments like flute, accordion, guitar, bass and electronic keyboard.

== Music video ==
The music video features all the artists in separate places, accompanied with a group of girls dancing a choreography. Zion doesn't appear in the music video as well as his verse on the song (Luny Tunes and Tainy appear on the video during Zion's verse instead). The video version of the song has a different instrumental, which is an electronic keyboard effect and the bass (the same instrumental was used for the remix version).

== Personnel ==
- Tony Tun Tun, Wisin, Yandel, Héctor el Father, Zion, Daddy Yankee — lead vocals
- Tony Tun Tun and Wisin — back vocals
- Gabriel Cruz — lyrics and composer
- Francisco Saldaña, Victor Cabrera, Marco Masis, Aaron Pena, Anthony Cotto — production
- Francisco Saldaña — flute
- Victor Cabrera — accordion
- Marco Masis — guitar and bass (only video version)
- Aaron Pena and Anthony Cotto — electronic keyboard

== Lyrics ==
"Noche de Entierro" is a break-up song that talks about a man who doesn't want to be with his girlfriend anymore because she apparently prefers to be in love with another man. It also has a sexual theme, because near the end of the song Wisin says that one year after their separation, he wantss to have a "night of bur[ing]" (casual sex). The entire song was written and composed by the prestigious reggaeton composer Wise, who also wrote the previous Luny Tunes' hit "Mayor Que Yo".

== Other remixes and versions ==
- The radio-released remix included Daddy Yankee, Héctor el Father, Ivy Queen, Jowell & Randy and Arcángel & De La Ghetto. It was released digitally for the first time on June 21, 2021.
- On the album Los Benjamins: La Continuación there appeared two remixes of the song:
  - The first was titled "Lo Nuestro Se Fue (Cumbia Remix)" which was sung by Ivy Queen, Alex Rivera, Daddy Yankee and Wisin.
  - The second remix "Luny Tunes and Nales Remix" was a "Noche de Entierro" hip hop-reggaeton remix whose English verses was sung by Nales of Doble A & Nales, Daddy Yankee and Wisin.
- Ivy Queen and Wisin & Yandel performed the song on her 2008 World Tour that has held at the Coliseum of Puerto Rico. However, during the song as Ivy began her first verse, Yandel was sent out early and he began to sing causing Queen to lose her verse. Since it wasn't Yandel's turn to perform, Wisin had to wait until Yandel sang again to then sing his verse.

== Chart positions ==
Chart (2006–07)	Peak position
U.S. Billboard Latin Pop Airplay	27
U.S. Billboard Hot Latin Songs	6
U.S. Billboard Latin Tropical Airplay	4
U.S. Billboard Latin Rhythm Airplay	3
U.S. Billboard Bubbling Under Hot 100	23
Venezuela Top Latino (Record Report)	2
