= Mas Flow 2 =

2005 compilation album by Luny Tunes & Baby Ranks

Compilation album by Luny Tunes and Baby Ranks
- Released: February 8, 2005
- Recorded: 2004
- Genre: Reggaeton
- Label: Universal Latino
- Producers: Luny Tunes (exec.); Nely "El Arma Secreta"; Nesty "La Mente Maestra"; Tainy; Bones; Naldo; Noriega

Luny Tunes and Baby Ranks chronology
Luny Tunes Presents La Mision 4: The Take Over (2004)	Mas Flow 2 (2005)	Reggaeton Hits (2006)

Baby Ranks chronology
Mas Flow 2 (2005)	Mi Flow: This Is It (2008)

Singles from Mas Flow 2
- 1. "Rakata" Released: January 27, 2005; 2. "Mayor Que Yo" Released: February 8, 2005; 3. "Te He Querido, Te He Llorado" Released: November 26, 2005; 4. "Verme" Released: September 12, 2006

Alternative cover
- Mas Flow 2.5 re-edition cover

Singles from Mas Flow 2.5
- 1. "Alócate" Released: 2006

Professional ratings
Review scores
Source	Rating
Allmusic	4/5 stars

Mas Flow 2 is the second compilation album by reggaeton producers Luny Tunes. The album was a joint venture with reggaeton artist Baby Ranks as he was featured in virtually every song in the album. Many of reggaeton's biggest names were featured in the album, such as Daddy Yankee, Wisin & Yandel, Zion & Lennox, Tito "El Bambino", Ivy Queen, Hector "El Father", Julio Voltio, and many others. Mas Flow 2 is one of the most critically acclaimed Latin albums of the year, and is considered to be substantially superior to the previous album. It also featured some artists from outside the reggaeton genre, such as Frankie J, Cultura Profetica, Deevani, Tonny Tun Tun, Spliff Star, among others.

The song "Mírame" performed by Daddy Yankee and Deevani covers a 2001 Hindi song "Eli re Eli" from the Bollywood movie "Yaadein". Mas Flow 2 won the Lo Nuestro Award for Urban Album of the Year. Mas Flow 2 is one of the few reggaeton albums to sell over a million copies worldwide and remains as the most successful compilation in the genre's history. It was certified gold in 2006 by the RIAA for sales of over 500,000 copies in the United States alone.

The sound introduced in the albums Mas Flow 1 and Mas Flow 2 is noted for inspiring the modern day sound of the reggaeton genre in the music of artists such as J Balvin, Nicky Jam, Farruko and Anuel AA.

== Track listing ==
No.	Title	Lyrics	Music	Performer(s)	Length
1.	"Mas Flow Intro"		Tainy	Alexis & Fido, Mr. Philips, Baby Ranks and Zion	0:58
2.	"Rakata"		Luny Tunes; Nely "El Arma Secreta"	Wisin & Yandel	2:51
3.	"El Tiburón"		Luny Tunes; Nely "El Arma Secreta"	Alexis & Fido and Baby Ranks	2:57
4.	"Dale Castigo"	Víctor Rivera	Luny Tunes; Nely "El Arma Secreta"; Naldo	Hector "El Father"	4:07
5.	"Mírame"		Luny Tunes; Nely "El Arma Secreta"; Nesty "La Mente Maestra"	Deevani and Daddy Yankee	3:32
6.	"Es Mejor Olvidarlo"		Luny Tunes	Zion & Lennox and Baby Ranks	4:50
7.	"Mayor Que Yo"		Luny Tunes	Hector "El Father", Tony Tun Tun, Baby Ranks, Wisin & Yandel and Daddy Yankee	4:08
8.	"Oh Johnny!"		Luny Tunes	Mr. Vegas	3:56
9.	"Con Rabia"		Luny Tunes	Polaco	3:19
10.	"Sóbale el Pelo"		Luny Tunes; Nesty "La Mente Maestra"	Tony Dize	2:21
11.	"Te He Querido, Te He Llorado"	Martha Pesante; Francisco Saldaña; Ernesto Padilla	Luny Tunes	Ivy Queen	4:17
12.	"Mírame" (remix)		Luny Tunes; Nely "El Arma Secreta"; Nesty "La Mente Maestra"	Tego Calderón, Deevani and Daddy Yankee	3:13
13.	"Déjala Volar"		Luny Tunes; Noriega	Tito "El Bambino"	3:24
14.	"Verme"		Luny Tunes	Notch and Baby Ranks	5:46
15.	"Tortura"		Luny Tunes; Naldo	Yaga & Mackie	3:42
16.	"Acorralándome"		Luny Tunes; Nely	Trebol Clan	2:12
17.	"Obsession (No Es Amor)"	Anthony Santos	Luny Tunes; Nely	Frankie J and Mr. Philips	3:33
18.	"La Killer"		Luny Tunes; Nesty	Joan and O'Neill	2:41
19.	"Fantasía"		Luny Tunes	Wibal & Alex	2:42
20.	"Gansta"		Luny Tunes	Baby Ranks and Julio Voltio	3:27
Total length:					53:08

Disc two

1. "Mas Flow Intro" (by Mr. Phillips, Zion, Baby Ranks, Alexis & Fido) (produced by Tainy) – 0:58
2. "¡Qué! ¿Cómo?" (by Vico C) (produced by Luny Tunes) – 3:18
3. "Tu Bailar" (by Baby Ranks) (produced by Luny Tunes, Nesty and Naldo) – 3:09
4. "Querer y Amar" (by Joan, O'Neill and Baby Ranks) (produced by Luny Tunes) – 4:37
5. "Salida" (by Baby Ranks and Bori (Cultura Profética) – 5:41
6. "Ta To'" (by Spliff Star, N.O.R.E., Gems Star and Mr. Phillip) (produced by Luny Tunes) – 3:00

=== Mas Flow 2.5 ===
Mas Flow 2.5 (released on August 29, 2006), is a 2006 re-edition of Mas Flow 2.

1. "Ponla Ahí" – Yo-Seph "The One" (produced by Luny Tunes and Tainy)
2. "Alócate" – Zion (produced by Luny Tunes and Tainy)
3. "Verme" – Baby Ranks featuring Notch
4. "Mayor Que Yo" – Baby Ranks, Daddy Yankee, Tony Tun-Tun, Hector "El Father", Wisin & Yandel, Don Omar, Zion
5. "Rakata" – Wisin & Yandel
6. "Te He Querido, Te He Llorado" – Ivy Queen
7. "Mírame (2)" – Daddy Yankee featuring Deevani and Tego Calderón
8. "Dale Castigo" – Hector "El Father"
9. "Es Mejor Olvidarlo" – Zion & Lennox featuring Baby Ranks
10. "El Tiburón" – Alexis & Fido featuring Baby Ranks
11. "Tortura" – Yaga & Mackie
12. "Déjala Volar" – Tito "El Bambino"
13. "Con Rabia" – Polaco
14. "Sóbale el Pelo" – Tony Dize
15. "Obsession" – Frankie J and Mr. Phillips
16. "Acorralándome" – Trebol Clan
17. "Gansta" – Voltio and Baby Ranks
18. "Una Salida" – Baby Ranks and Bori

==== DVD ====
1. "Rakata" – Wisin & Yandel
2. "El Tiburón" – Alexis & Fido featuring Baby Ranks
3. "Mayor Que Yo" – Baby Ranks, Daddy Yankee, Tony Tun-Tun, Hector "El Father", Wisin & Yandel
4. "Te He Querido, Te He Llorado" – Ivy Queen
5. "Con Rabia" – Polaco
6. "Dale Castigo" – Hector "El Father"
7. "Sóbale el Pelo" – Tony Dize
8. "Déjala Volar" – Tito "El Bambino"
9. "Alócate" – Zion

== Chart performance ==
Chart (2005)	Peak position
Dominican Albums (Musicalia)	4
U.S. Billboard 200	68
U.S. Billboard Top Latin Albums	2
U.S. Billboard Top Rap Albums	23
U.S. Billboard Top Reggae Albums	1
Chart (2006)	Peak position
U.S. Billboard Top Latin Albums	31

== Sales and certifications ==
Region	Certification	Certified units/sales
United States (RIAA)	Gold	500,000^{^}
^{^} Shipments figures based on certification alone.
