= Luny Tunes Presents La Mision 4: The Take Over =

Compilation album by Various artists
- Released: November 9, 2004
- Genre: Reggaeton
- Label: New Era Entertainment
- Producer: Luny Tunes; Monserrate & DJ Urba; Nesty "La Mente Maestra"; Naldo; Nely "El Arma Secreta"; Mr. G DJ Blass; N.O.T.T.Y; DJ Sonic; Yomy

Various artists chronology
La Trayectoria (2004)	Luny Tunes Presents La Mision 4: The Take Over (2004)	Mas Flow 2 (2005)

Luny Tunes Presents La Mision 4: The Take Over is a compilation album featuring various artists from the reggaeton genre and presented by Luny Tunes. It was released on November 9, 2004. Although there were previous "La Mision" albums, Luny Tunes bought the right to use the name and continued the series with the La Mision 4.

== Track listing ==
1. "Intro" (by Tempo, Wisin & Yandel, Getto y Gastam)
2. "El Booty" (by Wisin & Yandel) (Produced by Urba & Monserrate)
3. "Todo Empezó" (by Tony Dize)
4. "Tú Quieres Duro" (by Hector "El Father")
5. "Pierde El Control" (by Aniel) (Produced by Nesty, Naldo, Luny Tunes, Nely)
6. "No Dejes Que Se Muera" (by Zion & Lennox) (Produced by Naldo)
7. "Siente El Flow" (by Baby Ranks) (Produced by Luny Tunes)
8. "Fiera Callada" (by Varon) (Produced by Luny Tunes, Mr. G)
9. "Wiki Wiki" (by Yaviah)
10. "No Me Puedes Comprender" (by Wibal & Alex) (Produced by Nesty, Nely, Luny Tunes)
11. "¿Qué Sabes Tú?" (by TNT)
12. "Amor Perdóname" (by Karel)
13. "¿Amigos Para Qué?" (by TNT)
14. "Caliéntame" (by Wisin & Yandel) (Produced by Urba & Monserrate, DJ Blass)
15. "Sólo Mírame" (by Tony Dize) (Produced by Monserrate & DJ Urba)
16. "El Rolo" (by Alexis & Fido) (Produced by Luny Tunes)
17. "Misionando" (by Julio Voltio)
18. "Tú Te Entregas A Mí" (by Baby Rasta & Gringo) (Produced by Luny Tunes, Nely)
19. "Deja Que Se Suelte" (by Joan & O'Neill)
20. "Métele" (by Nicky Jam)
21. "Sal A La Disco" (by Angel Doze) (Produced by Nely, Luny Tunes, Naldo)
22. "Ven Esta Noche" (by Kartier) (Produced by N.O.T.T.Y, DJ Sonic)
23. "Ahora Es Que Es" (by Jenai)
24. "Conmigo No" (by Varon)

== Charts ==
Chart (2004/2005)	Peak position
U.S. Billboard 200	191
U.S. Billboard Latin Tropical Albums	1
U.S. Billboard Top Latin Albums	8
U.S. Billboard Top Reggae Albums	1
U.S. Billboard Top Compilation Albums	6

== See also ==
- List of number-one Billboard Tropical Albums from the 2000s
