= Tonny Tun Tun =

Puerto Rican singer (born 1977)

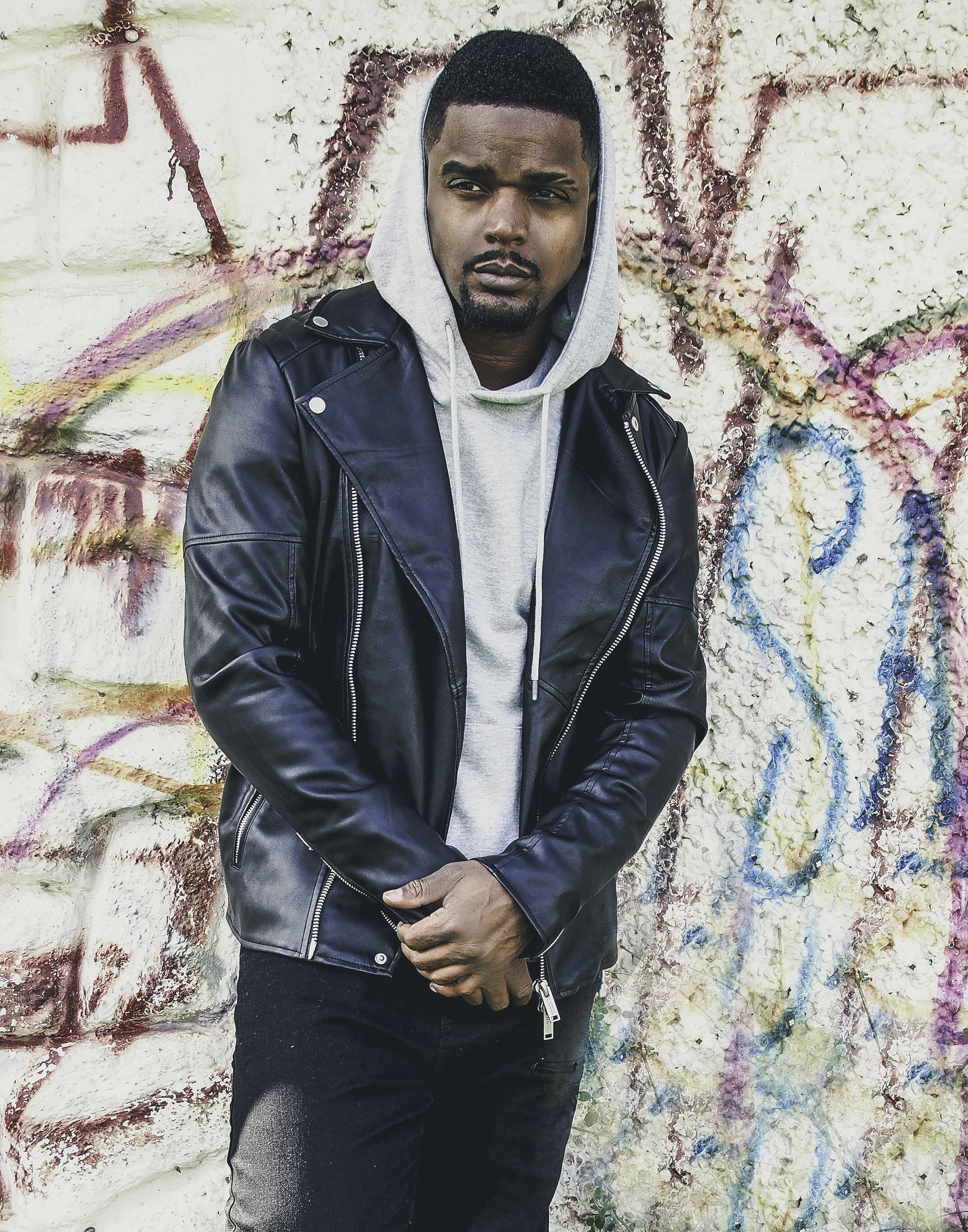

Background information
- Born: Juan Castro; March 4, 1977 (age 49); Carolina, Puerto Rico
- Genres: Merengue; reggaeton; Latin pop
- Occupations: Singer; songwriter; record producer
- Instruments: Vocals; piano
- Years active: 1996–present
- Label: Independent

Tonny Tun Tun (born Juan Castro; March 4, 1977) is a Puerto Rican singer, songwriter and record producer. He first became involved in music while attending Carolina's Escuela Libre de Musica, where he played with a local philharmonic orchestra. He joined Victor Roque and La Gran Manzana. After participating in Grupomania, Tony Tun Tun began composing for the merengue.

He debuted as a solo artist with the release of Caminando, singing its title song. In 2001, Juan Castro returned with Con la Música Por Dentro and "Afrodisiaco" in 2004. He has made guest appearances in reggaeton hits' "Mayor Que Yo" (2005) and "Noche de Entierro - Nuestro Amor se acabo" (2006).

== Awards ==
Year	Nomine/ Work	Award	Result	Joint nomination
2007	Álbum: Vacanería	Mejor álbum urbano	Nominated	
