= Yaga & Mackie =

Puerto Rican reggaeton duo

- Also known as: Los Mackieavelikos
- Origin: Puerto Rico
- Genres: Reggaeton
- Years active: 2001-2015 (Yaga & Mackie); 1996-present (Yaga); 1995-present (Mackie)
- Label: Los Mackieavelikos Inc. (2008-present)
- Members: Javier Martinez (Yaga); Luis Pizarro (Mackie)

Yaga & Mackie were a reggaeton duo from Puerto Rico. The duo appeared on several notable productions and compilations such as Mas Flow, Kilates Rompiendo El Silencio, and ElCangri.com. They were signed to Los Mackieavelikos Inc. In 2007, Yaga & Mackie released their highest charting single "Aparentemente", featuring Arcángel and De La Ghetto, which peaked at No. 42 on Billboard's Hot Latin Songs chart. Bad Bunny references Yaga & Mackie's debut album Sonando Diferente on the song "Está Cabrón Ser Yo" (featuring Anuel AA) from his second album YHLQMDLG.

They also owned Full Records, a reggaeton record label.

== Discography ==
=== Studio albums ===
- 2002: Sonando Diferente
- 2004: Clase Aparte
- 2005: La Moda
- 2007: La Reunión
- 2008: Los Mackieavelikos
- 2012: Los Mackieavelikos HD

=== Singles ===
- "Munequita" (featuring Johnny Prez)
- "Tortura"
- "La Batidora (featuring Don Omar)
- "Vestido Blanco" (featuring Don Omar)
- "Muévete" (featuring Pitbull)
- "Buche y Pluma" (featuring Julio Voltio)
- "El Tren"
- "Nena Chula"
- "Bailando" (featuring Nina Sky)
- "Maulla" (featuring Daddy Yankee)
- "Pide Más" (featuring Zion)
- "Imposible Ignorarte" (featuring Zion & Lennox)
- "Aparentemente" (featuring Arcángel & De La Ghetto)
- "El Pistolón" (featuring Arcángel & De la Ghetto and Randy)
- "Block Party" (featuring Daddy Yankee)
- "Ponla Hay" (featuring Andy Boy)
- "El Día Nacional del Genero" (featuring Divino, La Sista, MJ, Trebol Clan, Mario VI, Jomar, De La Ghetto, Naldo, Jayko, & Jadiel)
- "Pa' Frontiarle A Cualquiera" (featuring Arcángel)
- "Veo Veo"
- "Nada Va Pasar" (featuring Arcangel)
- "Pa' Frontiarle A Cualquiera" (Remix) (featuring Arcangel, Poeta Callejero, Daddy Yankee, Cosculluela, L.T "El Unico", Franco El Gorila, R-1, Ñengo Flow)
- "Dejate De Hablar" (featuring L.T "El Unico", Mexicano 777, Ñengo Flow)
- "La Bellaquera" (Remix) (featuring Arcangel)
- "Flotando En Amor"
- "Nos Vamos De Shopping" (Remix) (featuring Opi, J Alvarez, Arcangel, Jory, Farruko)
- "Bella dama"
- "Acechándote"
- "El Torero"
- "Morir Perreando"
- "En Contra Del Viento"
- "Yo Quisiera" (featuring Tego Calderon)
- "Niña" (featuring Sir Speedy)
- "Sex"
- "Si Tu Me Calientas"
- "Haciendo El Amor"
- "A Ti No"
- "Mi Mujer"
- "Trin" (featuring Lui-G 21+)
- "Princesa"
- "Tocándose Toda"
- "Nunca Imagine" (featuring Golpe a Golpe)
