= Luny Tunes =

Dominican reggaeton producers

- Origin: Dominican Republic
- Genre: Reggaeton
- Years active: 2000–2021; 2023–present
- Labels: Flow; VI; Mas Flow; Universal Latino; Machete; Venemusic
- Members: Francisco Saldaña (Luny) born in Santiago de los Caballeros, DR; Víctor Cabrera (Tunes) born in El Seibo, DR

Luny Tunes is a Dominican reggaeton production duo consisting of Francisco Saldaña (Luny) and Víctor Cabrera (Tunes) who have been known for creating unique musical rhythms for some of the most popular reggaeton artists since the early 2000s.

== Biography ==
Francisco Saldaña was born on June 23, 1979, and Víctor Cabrera was born on April 12, 1981. Originally from Lynn and Salem, Massachusetts and native to Dominican Republic, they originally started working at the Leverett House dining hall at Harvard University before their commercial success as reggaeton producers.

== Musical career ==
=== 2000–2003: The early years ===
Luny Tunes was reggaeton's first major hitmaking production team, cranking out an assembly line of hit singles, club anthems, and CD mixtapes, all the while collaborating with many of the style's top vocalists. Ivy Queen was the first person to work with Luny Tunes when they produced her single "Quiero Saber", as she trusted their talent. Luny Tunes were given their big break by DJ Nelson, a reggaeton pioneer who recognized their production talents, which had been well showcased on Héctor & Tito's A La Reconquista (2002), and signed them to his Flow Music label. Luny Tunes in turn made their major-label debut, alongside another promising young production talent, Noriega, on Mas Flow (2003). The various artists album consisted of 100% original material featured most of reggaeton's top vocalists of the time (Daddy Yankee, Don Omar, Tego Calderón, Wisin & Yandel, Héctor & Tito, Zion & Lennox, Baby Ranks, Nicky Jam, Trebol Clan, and many more) and firmly established the duo as a go-to production team. The album was a huge commercial success in Latin America and was one of the top Latin albums in the United States and would go on to sell over 500,000 copies worldwide despite limited mainstream exposure thanks to the reggaeton boom of 2002-2007.

=== 2004–2007: Rise to international fame ===
The following year Luny Tunes continued to further their reputation, establishing themselves as hitmakers when "Gasolina," one of their numerous productions featured on Daddy Yankee's Barrio Fino (2004), became a worldwide hit and club anthem. In addition to Barrio Fino, Luny Tunes also contributed productions to acclaimed albums by Don Omar (The Last Don, 2003) and Tego Calderón (El Abayarde, 2003), as well as albums by Eddie Dee (Los 12 Discípulos, 2004), Ivy Queen (Diva, 2004), Zion & Lennox (Motivando a la Yal, 2004), Nicky Jam (Vida Escante, 2004), and Trebol Clan (Los Bacatranes, 2004) — all of this within a two-year span. Their instrumentals and musical styles were creating a new standard in reggaeton in general.

In 2005, Luny Tunes released Mas Flow, Vol. 2, their first all-new album since the previous volume, and in 2006 they released a third, Mas Flow: Los Benjamins, along with a second compilation of previously released material, Reggaeton Hits, which had been preceded by a prior best-of collection, La Trayectoria (2004). "Mas Flow 2" is a landmark album for the reggaeton genre and one of the only products in the history of its music to sell over a million copies worldwide. The album remains the most successful compilation in the history of the genre spawning world renowned hits such as: "Rakata" by Wisin y Yandel, "Mayor Que Yo" featuring Wisin y Yandel, Daddy Yankee, Don Omar, Tonny Tun Tun and Héctor el Father, "Mirame" by Daddy Yankee feat. Deevani and "Te He Querido Te He Llorado" by Ivy Queen among other hit songs. "Mas Flow 2" is generally regarded as one of the greatest albums in the history of reggaeton music being one of the few albums of the genre to gain critical and commercial success outside the Spanish Hip Hop and Reggaeton circles.

Luny Tunes then remixed Janet Jackson's hit single "Call on Me", which featured Nelly. They then released the compilation Los Benjamins in 2006 and a special edition Los Benjamins: La Continuacion. This album produced the #1 worldwide hit single "Noche De Entierro" (Nuestro Amor) by Daddy Yankee, Tonny Tun Tun, Héctor el Father, Zion and Wisin y Yandel. "Noche De Entierro" remains one of the most famous and internationally recognized hits in the history of the reggaeton genre. By this point, Luny Tunes were employing various assistant producers and artists such as Nesty La Mente Maestra, Nely La Arma Secreta, Tainy Tunes, AA and Nales among many others...

=== 2008–2012 ===
In 2008, Luny Tunes signed duo Erre XI to Mas Flow. After their signing, the duo released their full-length debut album titled Luny Tunes Presents: Erre XI which spawned the single "Carita Bonita" featuring Pee Wee of Kumbia All Starz.

In 2009, Luny Tunes signed Dyland & Lenny to Mas Flow. They started their career in late 2009 with "Nadie Te Amará Como Yo". Then they were featured on the Luny Tunes produced track "Rompiendo Cadenas" by Latin Grammy recording artist Ana Bárbara. In 2010 they released their debut album My World. Their biggest hits from the album are "Nadie Te Amará Como Yo", "Quiere Pa' Que Te Quieran" and "Caliente" Produced by Madmusick (Yan & Yon).

In 2010, the duo produced work for Ivy Queen on her seventh studio album Drama Queen including "La Vida Es Así", "Cosas De La Vida", and "Aya Aya". As well as on her eighth studio album Musa, later in 2012.

In 2012 they produced a song for Farruko's album The Most Powerful Rookie. Among other albums they worked on was Daddy Yankee's Prestige. Luny Tunes released the cover art for the third edition of the Mas Flow series, Mas Flow 3. The album will feature Don Omar, Wisin & Yandel, Alexis & Fido, Zion & Lennox, Plan B, Jowell & Randy and among others.

=== 2014–present ===
Luny Tunes currently reside in Puerto Rico where they own a studio estimated to be worth around US$3.5 million. In recent years, the superstar production team has worked on hit songs such as "Adrenalina" by Wisin feat. Jennifer Lopez and Ricky Martin, "Duele El Corazon" by Enrique Iglesias, "Mayor Que Yo 3" by Daddy Yankee, Don Omar, Wisin y Yandel, "Moviendo Caderas" by Yandel feat. Daddy Yankee, "Limbo" by Daddy Yankee and even more pop influenced tracks for the likes of Farruko, Don Omar, and Tito El Bambino. They are currently working on "Mas Flow 3", though initially expected to be a more pop influenced album with featurings from the likes of J Balvin and Flex, the product will now be more of a return to reggaeton's roots like the first two Mas Flow albums due to the poor reception of the leaked lead single "La Fila" by Don Omar, Sharlene and Maluma. The duo signed a deal with Universal Latino in 2016 to distribute the much anticipated "Mas Flow 3" album. In an interview with Molusco TV released on November 1, 2023, Luny Tunes stated Mas Flow 3 is still planned to be released and are currently renegotiating with their parent label to make it happen.

== Charted songs ==
Title	Year	Performer(s)	Peak chart positions		Album
Title	Year	Performer(s)	US	US Latin	Album
"Gasolina"	2004	Daddy Yankee	32	17	Barrio Fino
"Lo Que Pasó, Pasó"	2004	Daddy Yankee	—	2	Barrio Fino
"Like You"	2005	Daddy Yankee	78	—	Barrio Fino
"Mayor Que Yo"	2005	Baby Ranks, Tony Tun Tun, Wisin & Yandel, Daddy Yankee, and Héctor el Father	—	3	Más Flow 2
"Mírame"	2005	Daddy Yankee and Deevani	—	34	Más Flow 2
"Rakata"	2005	Wisin & Yandel	85	2	Pa'l Mundo
"Llamé Pa' Verte"	2005	Wisin & Yandel	100	1	Pa'l Mundo
"Machucando"	2006	Daddy Yankee	—	2	Barrio Fino En Directo
"Tu Príncipe"	2006	Daddy Yankee featuring Zion & Lennox	—	35	Barrio Fino
"Paleta"	2006	Wisin & Yandel featuring Daddy Yankee	—	31	Pa'l Mundo
"Pam Pam"	2006	Wisin & Yandel	—	1	Pa'l Mundo
"Noche de Entierro"	2006	Tony Tun Tun, Wisin & Yandel, Héctor el Father, Zion, and Daddy Yankee	—	6	Más Flow: Los Benjamins
"Alócate"	2006	Zion	—	26	Más Flow: Los Benjamins
"Mayor Que Yo 3"	2015	Don Omar, Wisin & Yandel, and Daddy Yankee	—	20	TBA
"Zum Zum"	2018	Daddy Yankee, R.K.M. & Ken-Y, and Arcángel	—	20	TBA
"Si Supieras"	2019	Daddy Yankee and Wisin & Yandel	—	—	TBA
"No te Vayas"	2020	Yandel featuring J Balvin	—	—	Quién contra mí 2
"—" denotes a recording that did not chart or was not released in that territory.

== Discography ==
=== Main albums ===
- 2003: Mas Flow
- 2005: Mas Flow 2
- 2006: Mas Flow: Los Benjamins
- 2016 - ????: Mas Flow 3 (unreleased)

=== Compilation albums ===
- 2003: Desafío
- 2004: La Trayectoria
- 2004: Luny Tunes Presents La Mision 4: The Take Over
- 2006: Reggaeton Hits
- 2007: 20 #1's Now
- 2007: 20 #1's Then
- 2008: Luny Tunes Presents: Calle 434

=== Instrumental albums ===
- 2004: The Kings of the Beats
- 2006: The Kings of the Beats 2

=== Re-release albums ===
- 2004: Mas Flow: Platinum Edition
- 2006: Mas Flow 2.5
- 2007: Mas Flow: Gold Series
- 2007: Los Benjamins: La Continuación

=== Other ===
- 2008: Luny Tunes Presents: Erre XI

== Awards ==
- Latin Billboard Awards 2004: Más flow - "Tropical Album of the Year / Duo or Group"
- Latin Billboard Awards 2004: Más flow - "Tropical Album of the Year / New Generation"
- Reggaeton People's Choice Awards 2004: Luny Tunes - "Producer of the Year"
- Latin Grammy Awards 2005: Barrio Fino - "Best Album of the Year / Urban" (as Producers)
- Reggaeton People's Choice Awards 2005: Luny Tunes - "Producer of the Year"
- Reggaeton People's Choice Awards 2005: Mayor Que Yo - "Best Song of the Year"
- Reggaeton People's Choice Awards 2005: Mas Flow 2 - Best Album of the Year"
- Latin Billboard Awards 2006: Luny Tunes - "Producer of the Year"
- Premios Lo Nuestro Awards 2006: Mas Flow 2 - "Best Album of the Year / Urban Category"
- Furia Musical 2007: Luny Tunes - "Reggaeton Producers of the year".
- BMI Latin Awards 2007: Luny - "Songwriter of The Year".

== See also ==
- Reggaeton
- Mas Flow Inc.
- Urban
