= Eliel (producer) =

Puerto Rican record producer

- Also known as: El Que Habla Con Las Manos, DJ Eliel
- Born: Eliel Lind Osorio; January 7, 1981 (age 45); Río Grande, Puerto Rico
- Genres: Reggaeton Romántico, Ballad, Reggaeton, Hip hop, Latín
- Instruments: Keyboard, Electric guitar, Sampler, Synthesizer
- Years active: 2001–present
- Labels: VI Music; Machete Music

Eliel Lind Osorio (born January 7, 1981, in Rio Grande, Puerto Rico), best known mononymously as Eliel, is a Latin music, ballad, reggaeton, and urban producer. His partnership with Don Omar has led him to critical acclaim and commercial success.

== Biography ==
Eliel was raised by his grandparents, who supported him in his career as a producer. He began his career as a percussionist in the 1st Baptist Church in Loiza, Puerto Rico. It was then that his mother encouraged him to learn the piano because the church's choir was missing a pianist. He was already proficient in the bongo, drums, and the congas. Although he was reluctant to learn the piano, his skill in the instrument was unique among other producers.

=== Music career ===
At the age of 15, his grandparents built a small recording studio in his room, where he began recording Christian and political jingles. Due to his success, his grandparents allowed him to use the second floor of their home as a recording studio. In that studio, he began experimenting with reggaeton. At 16, known as DJ Menor, he began his work with some of the most successful rappers at the time: Baby Rasta & Gringo, Bebe, Hornyman y Pantyman, Charlie y Felito, among others. He was then offered a professional contract and moved to Santurce, Puerto Rico, close by to all the record companies. It was in the Santurce area where he met the then-rookie artist, Don Omar, who became a frequent collaborator.

Eliel signed a contract with the record company VI Music to record vocals for their artists. He made his first musical track for Daddy Yankee and Nicky Jam for the album Las Gárgolas. Upon listening to it the singers did not believe it had been made by Eliel and thought it was a track taken out of a movie soundtrack. He produced more representative Puerto Rican reggaeton tracks, including "Donde Están las Gatas" in the voice of Daddy Yankee, "Salen Inquietas" by Magnate y Valentino, and "Dile" and "Vuelve" in the voice of Don Omar.

In 2002 he worked on the albums La Reconquista of the former duo Héctor & Tito, a compilation of various artists Mas Flow 1, and on The Last Don (album). With his success in the reggaeton world, his colleagues tried to give him an artistic name, but the name Eliel was already established. It is because of his shy nature that he becomes known as "the one that speaks with his hands" (El que Habla con las Manos). Eliel worked with Don Omar's new recording production, King of Kings, and in the production Reggaeton Confessions, where exponents of different musical genres are uniting with reggaeton.

"There was a lot of ignoring going on when I knocked on people's doors so they could listen to my work. But with a lot of patience and hard work I have accomplished all of my dreams."

—

=== Recent events ===
Eliel said he had been resigned to the Orfanato Music Group and had gone to WY Records but this was later denied. He signed with Pina Records .

== Discography ==
- 2004 El Que Habla Con Las Manos
- 2005 Greatest Beats
- 2008 Beat Collection
