= Trébol Clan =

Reggaeton group from Puerto Rico

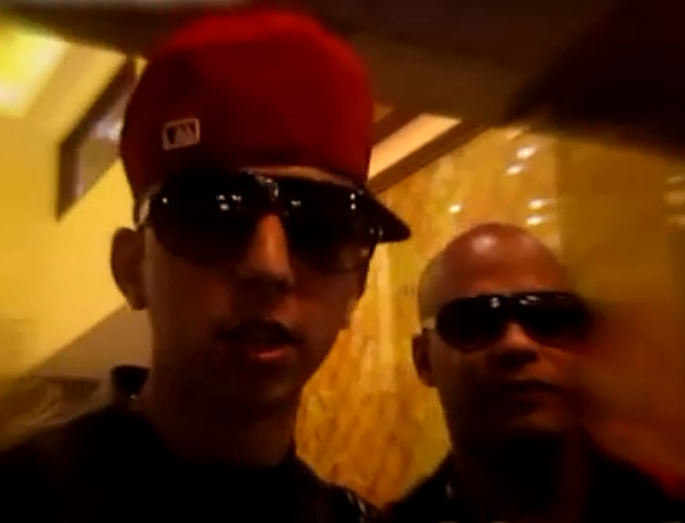
- Periquito (left) and DJ Joe (right) in Lima, Peru (2012)

Background information
- Origin: Puerto Rico
- Genre: Reggaeton
- Years active: 1996–present
- Labels: Pina Records; Geniux; VI; Gold Star; Universal Latino; Machete; Blow; Brutal Noise; Fantasy
- Members: Héctor Pagán (Periquito or Trébol) (1996–)
- Past members: Joe Rosario (DJ Joe, Dr. Joe) (2009–2011); Gilberto Matías Vélez (Berto El Original) (1996–2010); Frank Cárdenas (Mr. Frank) (2008–2011); Omar Rojas (Plomo) (1996–1999)
- Website: www.trebolclanoficial.com

Trébol Clan is a Puerto Rican reggaeton musical group, introduced in the genre by DJ Joe. Formed by Hector Pagan "Periquito/Trebol" (Puerto Rico, 1981 or 1982), Omar "Plomo" and Berto "El Original" (Bayamon , Puerto Rico , April 2 , 1980), Trébol Clan has been featured in Don Omar's The Last Don and Los Bandoleros, Luny Tunes's Mas Flow 2, and have released one CD in the genre named Los Bacatranes. When they had their label, they released the mixtape Los Reyes de la Lenta: The Comeback (2008).

== History ==
The group first appeared in the late 1990s with DJ Joe. DJ Joe and Trébol Clan is the name that was given to this group halfway through 1997. Before that, the Trébol Clan was composed of four people: DJ Joe, Berto, Hector Delgado, and Don Omar. Their first musical appearances were on CDs titled “DJ Joe Vol. 3", "Rican Muffin", and "DJ Joe Vol. 4, 5 and 6". Then, because of the chemistry that they had with DJ Joe, the latter decided in 2000 to be the musical producer of his first record company production titled, “DJ Joe y Trébol Clan – Los Genios Musicales”. Later, after the success of the CD, Hector Delgado entered the religious field and abandoned the group leaving only Don Omar, Berto, and DJ Joe. For Trébol Clan, the success made them reach the production of “Fatal Fantassy” surpassing the 50,000 sold mark.

Then the musical career of Trébol Clan continued after a series of takeovers by various artists' record companies like "Gárgolas (Vol. 2, 3, 4)", “Fatal Fantassy (Vol. 1, 2, 3)”, “The Godfather”, "Buddha's Family", “Boricuas NY Vol. 2”, “Playero 42”, “Luny Tunes Mas Flow” (more than 150,000 copies sold) and Don Omar's "The Last Don" (more than 325,000 copies sold). With melodies like “Tu Cuerpo Me Arrebata” from Don Omar's The Last Don, “Bailando Provocas” from the Luny Tunes' CD Mas Flow, “Tu Cuerpo Baila Conmigo” from the CD Ranking Stone Censurado and "Agárrala" y "A Ti" from Gárgolas 4, Trébol Clan was shown to be one of the hottest groups on the Island. Because of this, they were asked to perform in various productions, like when they participated in Don Omar's concert, where the Roberto Clemente Coliseum was filled, and the performance of the song with Don Omar and the song from the CD Luny Tunes y Noriega Mas Flow, being the most acclaimed of the great event.

The work continued in 2008 when Trébol Clan launched its CD titled Los Reyes De La Lenta: The ComeBack. This new CD featured artists Jowell & Randy, Franco "El Gorila", Casa de Leones, and Tito El Bambino. A new single, "Wow", was produced by their new label "Blow Music Factory". The Comeback was re-launched as a digital release in 2009 by an independent label, Brutal Noise, worldwide on January 15, 2009. Fantasia Musical hit the streets on June 23, 2009.

As of March 4, 2010, Trébol Clan separated and Periquito became known as "3Bol". Both went separate ways. Perry is now known as "3BOL", but recently announced he is Trébol Clan on his Berto and has gone solo signing under Millones records. Recently, Trébol Clan mostly collaborates with many different underground reggaeton artists from different Spanish-speaking countries including, Peru, Guatemala, and Puerto Rico. In 2019, Trébol Clan said they were working on new material called Forever Young.

== Discography ==
=== Studio albums ===
- 2000: Los Genios Musicales (con DJ Joe)
- 2004: Los Bacatranes (con DJ Joe)
- 2008: The Comeback (con DJ Joe)
- 2009: Fantasía Musical (con DJ Joe)
- 2009: The Producers (con Dr. Joe y Mr. Frank)
- 2010: Trébol Clan Es Trébol Clan (con DJ Joe)
- 2015: Yo Soy Trébol: El Artista (con DJ Joe)

Mixtapes

- 2006: The Unreleased
- 2007: Da Mixtape
- 2008: Salvando Al Género
- 2013: Fantasy Records y Sold Out Management Presentan: Trebol Clan
