= Mas Flow (album) =

2003 compilation album by Luny Tunes & Noriega

Compilation album by Luny Tunes & Noriega
- Released: August 26, 2003
- Recorded: 2002–2003
- Genre: Reggaeton
- Label: Flow Music; VI Music
- Producer: Luny Tunes (Exec.); Noriega (Co-exec.); DJ Nelson, Eliel (producer), Nestor Salomon (mastering)

Luny Tunes chronology
Mas Flow (2003)	The Kings of the Beats (2004)

Noriega chronology
Mas Flow (2003)	Contra La Corriente (2004)

Professional ratings
Review scores
Source	Rating
Allmusic	3/5 stars

Mas Flow is the debut compilation album by reggaeton producers Luny Tunes. Along with Tego Calderón's El Abayarde, also released in 2003, Mas Flow was the first reggaeton album to meet a mass audience. In doing so, it introduced the world not only to the musical style itself in album format, but also to Luny Tunes, the production duo who would quickly become one of reggaeton's best known producers. The mixtape nature of Mas Flow helped introduce a host of notable reggaeton vocalists in the process, including Daddy Yankee, Don Omar, Tego Calderón, Wisin & Yandel, Héctor & Tito, Nicky Jam, Baby Ranks, Zion & Lennox, and others. The album's success led to the release of Mas Flow 2.

The album is considered a landmark in the history of recorded latin music and one of the most influential works in reggaeton. The song structure and production style Luny Tunes implemented in "Mas Flow" would influence the production style of most modern reggaeton recordings.

== Track list ==
All music is composed by Luny Tunes.

No.	Title	Artist(s)	Length
1.	"Mas Flow Intro"	Luny Tunes & Noriega	1:09
2.	"Cae La Noche"	Hector & Tito	2:58
3.	"Aventura"	Wisin & Yandel	2:50
4.	"Entre Tú Y Yo"	Don Omar	3:04
5.	"Métele Sazón"	Tego Calderón	4:02
6.	"Cójela Que Va Sin Jockey"	Daddy Yankee	3:03
7.	"Hay Algo En Ti"	Zion & Lennox & Tito El Bambino	3:52
8.	"Bailando Provocas"	Trebol Clan	2:22
9.	"Motivate El Baile"	Baby Ranks	3:23
10.	"Busco Una Mujer"	Las Guanábanas	2:33
11.	"Bella Dama"	Yaga & Mackie	3:16
12.	"La Gata Suelta"	Glory	2:53
13.	"Tú Me Pones Mal"	Angel & Khriz	2:51
14.	"Si Te Pregunta"	Nicky Jam	2:29
15.	"Tú Anda Sola"	Jomar	2:21
16.	"Tú Sabes"	Plan B	3:07
17.	"Métele Perro"	K-Mil	1:53
18.	"Te Quiero Ver"	Cidelis	2:45
19.	"Quisiera"	John Eric	3:22
20.	"No Seas Niña"	Angel Doze	2:43
Total length:			56:56

In 2007 Mas Flow Gold Edition was released with the same track listing.

== Videos ==
- Cae La Noche - Hector & Tito
- Aventura - Wisin & Yandel
- Métele Sazón - Tego Calderón
- Cojela Que Va Sin Jockey - Daddy Yankee
- Hay Algo En Ti - Zion & Lennox*Even thought Tito was in the song, but not in the video.
- Bailando Provocas - Trebol Clan
- Motívate Al Baile - Baby Ranks
- Tú Sabes - Plan B
- Busco Una Mujer - Las Guanábanas
- Quien Tiene Mas Flow - K-Mill

== Chart performance ==
=== Mas Flow ===
Chart (2003)	Peak position
US Top Heatseekers (Billboard)	17
US Latin Albums (Billboard)	11
US Reggae Albums (Billboard)	1
US Tropical Albums (Billboard)	1

=== Mas Flow: Platinum Edition ===
Chart (2004)	Peak position
US Top Heatseekers (Billboard)	46
US Latin Albums (Billboard)	24
US Reggae Albums (Billboard)	6
US Tropical Albums (Billboard)	6
