= Noriega (producer) =

Reggaeton music producer

- Born: Norgie Noriega Montes
- Genres: Reggaeton
- Occupation: Producer songwriter singer
- Years active: 2001–present
- Labels: Mas Flow Inc.; Machete Music; Noriega Music Publishing

Norgie Noriega Montes (best known only as Noriega) is a reggaeton producer and singer known for making No. 1 hits in reggaeton along with reggaeton producers Luny Tunes. He also CEO of Noriega Music Publishing.

He won three BMI Awards with the songs "Amigo mío" by Toño Rosario and Tego Calderón in 2006, "Carita bonita" by Pee Wee in 2010 and in 2017 with "Si lo hacemos bien" by Wisin, and two Billboard Latin Music Awards in 2004.

== Musical career ==
Noriega was one of the primary reggaeton producers during the style's rise to popularity and commercial significance. He began earning high-profile production credits in 2002 with Las Guanábanas, Guillaera; Hector & Tito, A La Reconquista; Magnate & Valentino, Rompiendo el Hielo. His breakout came the following year, when he produced tracks for Ivy Queen, Diva, Tego Calderón, El Abayarde; and Vico C, En Honor a la Verdad, who were among the most respected artists in Puerto Rico at the time.

Also in 2003, Noriega was co-billed with Luny Tunes on Mas Flow, a groundbreaking mixtape for DJ Nelson's Flow Music label. He was a finalist in the Billboard Latin Music Awards in 2004, along with Luny Tunes. While Luny Tunes continued on with the Mas Flow series, becoming one of reggaeton's undisputed top hitmakers in the process, Noriega proceeded to work on his first truly solo mixtape, Contra la Corriente (2004), which was again commissioned by DJ Nelson and released via Universal Latino. Also in 2004, Noriega was credited with an impressive list of production work: Eddie Dee, 12 Discípulos; Las Guanábanas, Collection Two; Tego Calderón, El Enemy de los Guasíbiri; Mikey Perfecto, Evolucion Arrestada; Zion & Lennox, Motivando a la Yal; Baby Rasta & Gringo, Sentenciados. In the following years, his career underwent some upheaval; most notably, he left the Flow Music camp and resurfaced in 2006 under the Univision banner for his second solo release, Sin Control (2006).

Noriega occasionally sings on the songs he produces. He was the composer of the single "Por Amar a Ciegas" by Arcangel.

== Discography ==
- 2003 Mas Flow (with Luny Tunes)
- 2004 Contra la Corriente
- 2006 Sin Control
