= Divino =

American reggaeton singer (born 1972)

- Also known as: El Más Que Canta
- Born: Daniel Velázquez; December 6, 1972 (age 53); New York City, U.S.
- Origin: Ponce, Puerto Rico
- Genres: Reggaeton; tropical; R&B; ballad; Latin trap
- Occupation: Singer
- Instrument: Vocals
- Years active: 1993–2010; 2013–present
- Labels: Machete; MVP; Eme

Daniel Velázquez (born December 6, 1972), better known by his stage name Divino, is a Puerto Rican reggaeton singer.

== Early life, family and education ==
Divino and his family moved from The Bronx, New York, to Ponce, Puerto Rico. Divino, age fifteen, working as an assistant in a juvenile institution.

His brother, K2 Young, had made in-roads in the reggaetón genre as a member of DJ Playero's crew. He was friends with Baby Ranks, with whom he often performed. Divino decided that it was his brother's fate to conquer the genre, while his own musical aspirations faded to the background. In 1999, Divino's brother was killed, only one day after celebrating his 21st birthday.

== Career ==
After Divino's brother died, Baby Ranks then asked Divino to join him on a track he was recording for the production Darwins The Music II. Later, they joined forces again for the hit Quiero Esa Nena from DJ Nelsons The Flow: Sweet Dreams. Impressed by Divino's voice and his unique songwriting abilities, other artists began requesting that he appear on their records.

Perhaps the most pivotal release in Divino's career was the song Quiero Saber, which he recorded for the compilation album MVP which sold over 100,000 copies in 2002. Shortly thereafter, José Angel Gocho Torres, the producer of MVP, teamed up with Raúl López, CEO of Luar Music and MVP Records.

Gocho approached Divino and asked if he would be interested in signing to the upstart label of MVP Records, Divino quickly agreed. In 2003, he released his solo album Todo A Su Tiempo, which included such hits as the Daddy Yankee collaboration Se Activaron Los Anormales, Super Gangsteril featuring Polaco, Ya Estoy Llegando, and the ballad Dile Mar. But the most meaningful song for Divino was the profoundly personal Una Lágrima, a tribute to his late brother. Divino briefly was a part of the label Drama Records owned by Ivy Queen from 2007 to 2008 where he released one single "Pobre Corazón" for her album Sentimiento (2007).

Moved by his introspective lyrics and his distinctive flow, audiences and critics alike began to take note. Todo A Su Tiempo achieved gold status and Divino earned two nominations for the 2004 Billboard Awards: one for Best New Artist and another for Best Tropical Album. The nominations recognized Divino in both the new artists and tropical album categories.

Since then, Divino has released such hits as Llégale, featured in Hector El Father Presenta Los Anormales and Un Simple Bandolero, featured in MVP 2:The Grand Slam. With reggaetón earning international acclaim and Divino poised for even greater success, MVP Records released Todo A Su Tiempo: Platinum Edition in 2006. The album includes original recordings from Todo A Su Tiempo, and the hits Noche de Travesura, Un Simple Bandolero and Llégale, with two brand new songs, Amor de Una Noche and Para Donde Voy. later in 2010 He is also recording his second solo album, Por Experiencias Propias. This album is presented with a new musical approach which is the ballad And tropical genres, and is also the first to not contain reggaeton like the previous ones. As Part Of Your New Project Contains Three Singles: Mi vida, Conmigo siempre, & Más fuerte que ayer. Later in the next Year Beginning of the Year 2011 until the middle of 2013 After a Small Musical hiatus Returns with New Label Under the Eme Music label, Then Releases a Single: Te deseo lo mejor Together with Baby Rasta from the Baby Rasta and Gringo Dúo.

== Discography ==
=== Studio album ===
- 2004: Todo A Su Tiempo
- 2010: Por Experiencias Propias
