= Baby Ranks =

Puerto Rican reggaeton artist

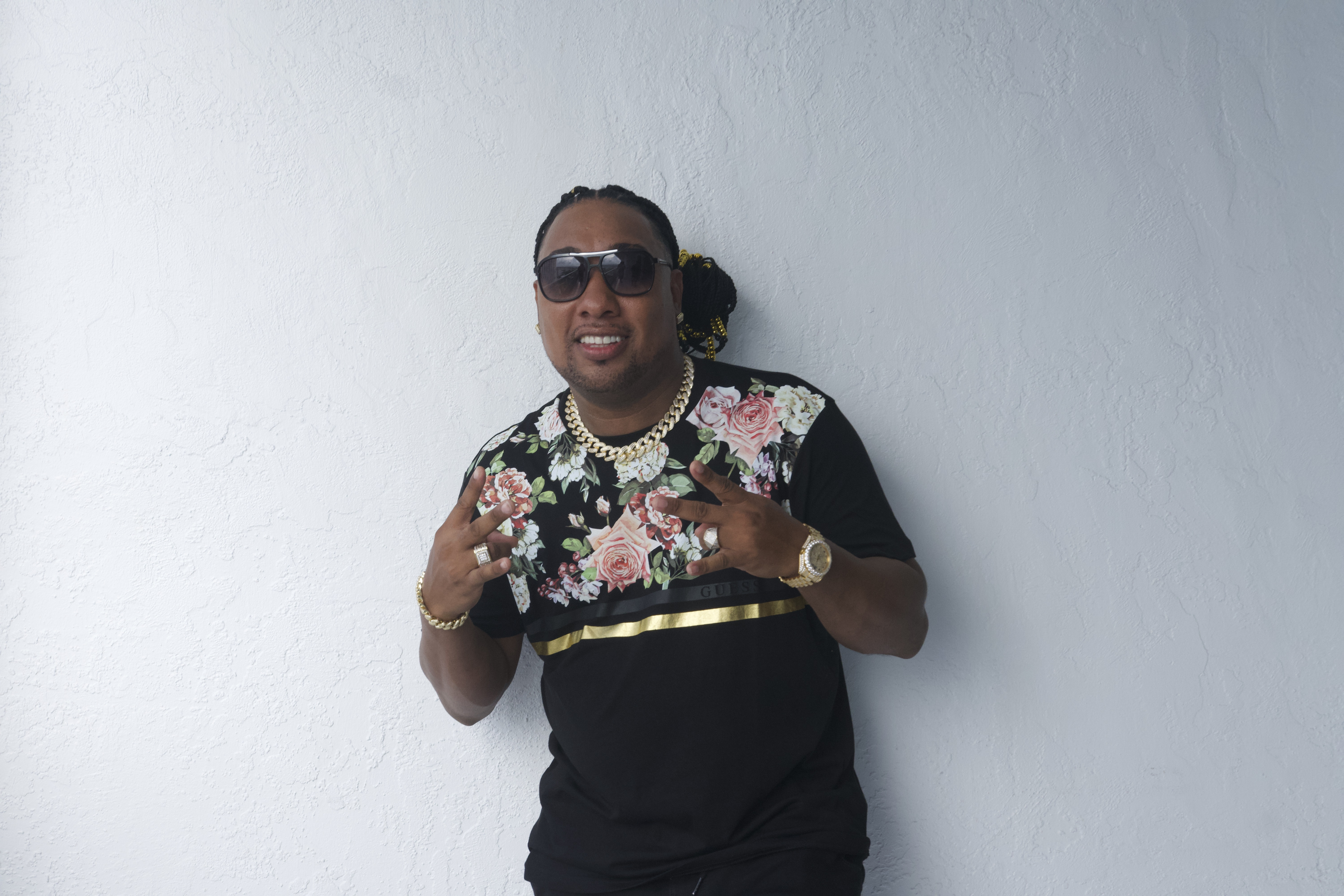
- Baby Ranks in 2020

Background information
- Also known as: Baby Ranks
- Born: David Luciano Acosta; September 4, 1978 (age 47); San Juan, Puerto Rico
- Genres: Reggaeton
- Occupations: Singer, producer
- Years active: 2000–present
- Labels: ABM Entertainment Worldwide, Universal Music Group, Mas Flow Inc., Br Music Records

David Luciano Acosta, known professionally as Baby Ranks, is a Puerto Rican and Dominican reggaeton artist. He has co-billing on the Luny Tunes album Mas Flow 2, and sings on multiple tracks including the single "Mayor Que Yo" ("Older than Me"). The album ranked #5 on the Billboard year-end Latin Album Chart, #7 on the year-end Tropical Album Chart, and #9 on the Reggae Album Chart, for the year 2005. "Mayor Que Yo" won Reggaeton Song of the Year at the 2006 Latin Billboard Music Awards.

After more than a decade laying down tracks for other artists, Baby Ranks saw the release of his long-in-the-making solo debut, Mi Flow: This Is It, in the summer of 2008. Baby Ranks has had quite a few hit songs in his career which are "Mayor Que Yo Feat. Daddy Yankee & Wisin Y Yandel & Tony Tun Tun", "El Amor Se Fue Feat. Angel Lopez", "Verme Feat. Notch", "El Tiburon Feat. Alexis Y Fido", "De Fuga", "Motivate Al Baile", "Linda Flor Feat. Mr. Phillip & El Pueblo", "Noche De Carnaval", "Tu Bailar", "Es Mejor Olvidarlo Feat. Zion Y Lennox".

In December 2018, Baby Ranks signed a major recording contract with ABM Entertainment Worldwide, and an album was set to be released in 2020.

== Discography ==
- 2005: Mas Flow 2 (with Luny Tunes)
- 2008: Mi Flow: This Is It
- 2019: The Legend Is Back
