= Zion & Lennox discography =

- Studio albums: 3
- Singles: 15
- Music videos: 20
- Mixtapes: 3

The discography of Puerto Rican reggaeton duo Zion & Lennox, which made up of Felix Gerardo Ortiz Torres and Gabriel Pizarro, consists of three studio albums, three mixtapes, and 15 singles as lead artists.

Both members of the duo were born in Carolina, Puerto Rico, but would form as a duo in 2000. They were part of the reggaeton underground scene until 2004, year in which they released their first studio album, Motivando a la Yal, under White Lion Records. The production's success was later influenced by Daddy Yankee's Barrio Fino, which led reggaeton to mainstream audiences. Also the track "Ahora" featuring Angel Doze was included into the video game FIFA Football 2005 soundtrack.

In 2007, the duo decided to have a short hiatus period and they released their respective studio albums as soloists: The Perfect Melody (Zion) and Los Mero Meros (Lennox). Three years later, they signed to Pina Records and released their second studio album, Los Verdaderos, that same year. The duo would also appear on the label's compilation album La Fórmula in 2012. Four years later, the duo released their third studio album, Motivan2, under Warner Music Latina. Throughout their career, Zion & Lennox explored different music genres, such as reggaeton, hip hop, latin pop, electropop, contemporary R&B and dancehall.

== Albums ==
=== Studio ===
Title	Album details	Peak chart positions			Certifications
Title	Album details	US	US Latin	US Rap	Certifications
Motivando a la Yal	Release: May 4, 2004; Label: White Lion	—	32	—	
Los Verdaderos	Release: November 2, 2010; Label: Pina, Sony Latin	—	10	23	
Motivan2	Release: September 30, 2016; Label: Warner Latina	155	1	—	AMPROFON: Gold; RIAA: Platinum (Latin)

=== Mixtapes and re-issues ===
Title	Album details	Peak chart positions	
Title	Album details	US Latin	US Heat.
Motivando a la Yal: Special Edition	Release: June 7, 2005; Label: White Lion	10	9
Pasado, Presente & Futuro	Release: October 12, 2009; Label: Baby	—	—
Los Diamantes Negros	Release: May 24, 2014; Label: Baby	—	—

== Singles ==
=== As lead artist ===
Title	Year	Peak chart positions					Certifications (sales thresholds)	Album
Title	Year	US Bub.	US Latin	US Trop.	MEX	SPA	Certifications (sales thresholds)	Album
"Doncella"	2004	—	23	3	—	—		Motivando a la Yal
"Yo Voy" (featuring Daddy Yankee)	2004	23	12	7	—	—		Motivando a la Yal
"Don't Stop"	2005	—	30	8	—	—		Motivando a la Yal: Special Edition
"¿Cuánto Tengo Que Esperar?"	2005	—	35	—	—	—		MVP 2: The Grand Slam
"Amor Genuino"	2009	—	—	27	—	—		Pasado, Presente & Futuro
"¿Cómo Curar?"	2010	—	30	10	—	—		Los Verdaderos
"Hoy Lo Siento" (featuring Tony Dize)	2010	—	49	5	—	—		Los Verdaderos
"Chupop"	2012	—	(Note: "Chupop" did not enter the Billboard Hot Latin Songs chart but peaked on the Latin Rhythm Airplay chart at number 18.)	—	—	—		La Fórmula
"La Botella"	2013	—	31	14	—	—		Los Diamantes Negros
"Pierdo La Cabeza"	2014	—	9	1	—	70	PROMUSICAE: Gold; RIAA: 3× Platinum (Latin)	Non-album single
"Ganas de Ti"	2015	—	31	1	—	—		Melodías de Oro
"Embriágame"	2016	—	11	14	46	56	PROMUSICAE: Platinum	Motivan2
"Otra Vez" (featuring J Balvin)	2016	19	5	27	31	7	FIMI: Gold; PROMUSICAE: 4× Platinum	Motivan2
"Mi Tesoro" (featuring Nicky Jam)	2017	—	29	—	—	68	PROMUSICAE: Gold	Motivan2
"No Es Justo" (with J Balvin)	2018	—	10	—	15	—	PROMUSICAE: 2× Platinum	Vibras
"La Player (Bandolera)"	2018	—	—	—	—	33		Non-album singles
"A Forgotten Spot (Olvidado)" (with De La Ghetto, Ivy Queen, PJ Sin Suela and Lucecita Benitez)	2018	—	—	—	—	—		Non-album singles
"Pa olvidarte" (Remix) (with ChocQuibTown, Farruko and Manuel Turizo)	2019	—	—	—	—	81	RIAA: 3× Platinum (Latin)	Non-album singles
"Llégale" (with Lunay)	2019	—	—	—	—	41		Non-album singles
"Guayo" (with Anuel AA and Haze)	2019	—	50	—	—	47	PROMUSICAE: Gold	Non-album singles
"Trampa" (with Prince Royce)	2019	—	—	—	—	—		AlterEgo
"Dulcecitos" (with Piso 21)	2020	—	—	—	46	—	RIAA: Gold (Latin)	El Amor En Los Tiempos del Perreo
"Bésame" (with Play-N-Skillz and Daddy Yankee)	2020	—	26	—	—	—	RIAA: Platinum (Latin)	Non-album singles
"Loco" (with Justin Quiles and Chimbala)	2021	—	13	—	—	4		Non-album singles
"La Pasamos Cxbrxn" (with Feid)	2022	—	—	—	—	57		

=== Other charted songs ===
Title	Year	Peak chart positions		Album
Title	Year	US Latin Rhythm	US Trop.	Album
"Te Invitan al Party" (L.D.A. featuring Zion & Lennox)	2006	23	25	Chosen Few II: El Documental
"Mujeriego"	2010	16	—	Non-album single
"Momentos"	2010	19	—	Los Verdaderos
"La Cita" (featuring Jowell & Randy)	2010	16	—	Los Verdaderos
"Cantazo" (featuring Yomo)	2012	20	—	La Fórmula
"Solo Tú"	2014	18	—	Sentimiento de un Artista

=== As featured artist ===
List of singles, with selected chart positions, showing year released, certifications and album name
Title	Year	Peak chart positions									Certifications	Album
Title	Year	US	US Latin	AUT	FRA	ITA	MEX	POR	SPA	SWI	Certifications	Album
"Los 12 Discípulos" (Eddie Dee featuring Gallego, Vico C, Tego Calderón, Julio Voltio, Daddy Yankee, Ivy Queen, Nicky Jam, Johnny Prez, Wiso G, and Zion & Lennox)	2004	—	—	—	—	—	—	—	—	—		12 Discípulos
"Tu Príncipe" (Daddy Yankee featuring Zion & Lennox)	2006	—	35	—	—	—	—	—	—	—		Barrio Fino
"Agárrale El Pantalón" (Alexis & Fido featuring Zion & Lennox)	2006	—	36	—	—	—	—	—	—	—		The Pitbulls
"Abusando del Género" (with Tempo, Trebol Clan, Julio Voltio and Yomo)	2006	—	(Note: "Abusando del Género" did not enter the Billboard Hot Latin Songs chart but peaked on the Latin Rhythm Airplay chart at number 27.)	—	—	—	—	—	—	—		Abusando del Género
"Mi Cama Huele A Ti" (Tito El Bambino featuring Zion & Lennox)	2009	—	6	—	—	—	—	—	—	—		El Patrón
"Ella, Ella" (Don Omar featuring Zion & Lennox)	2010	—	(Note: "Ella Ella" did not enter the Billboard Hot Latin Songs chart but peaked on the Latin Digital Songs chart at number 45.)	—	—	—	—	—	—	—		Meet the Orphans
"Mi Nena" (Xavi The Destroyer featuring Zion & Lennox)	2012	—	(Note: "Mi Nena" did not enter the Billboard Hot Latin Songs chart but peaked on the Latin Rhythm Airplay chart at number 17.)	—	—	—	—	—	—		Meet the Orphans 2: New Generation	
"Diosa de los Corazones" (with R.K.M. & Ken-Y, Arcángel and Lobo)	2012	—	4	—	—	—	—	—	—	—		La Fórmula
"Como Antes" (Tito El Bambino featuring Zion & Lennox)	2014	—	20	—	—	—	—	—	—		Alta Jerarquía	
"Lentamente" (J Álvarez featuring Jowell & Randy and Zion & Lennox)	2014	—	(Note: "Lentamente" did not enter the Billboard Hot Latin Songs chart but peaked on the Latin Rhythm Airplay chart at number 19.)	—	—	—	—	—	—	—		De Camino Pa' La Cima: Reloaded
"La Dueña de tu Amor" (Marala featuring Zion & Lennox)	2016	—	—	—	—	—	—	—	—		TBA	
"Te Quiero Pa' Mí" (Don Omar featuring Zion & Lennox)	2016	—	12	—	—	—	—	—	19	—	TBA	PROMUSICAE: Platinum; RIAA: Gold (Latin)
"Sola" (Remix) (Anuel AA featuring Farruko, Wisin, Daddy Yankee, and Zion & Lennox)	2016	—	34	—	—	—	—	—	15	—	TBA	PROMUSICAE: Platinum
"Reggaetón Lento (Bailemos) (Remix)" (CNCO featuring Zion & Lennox)	2017	—	—	—	—	—	—	—	—	—		Non-album single
"Súbeme La Radio" (Enrique Iglesias featuring Descemer Bueno and Zion & Lennox)	2017	81	2	7	8	3	1	9	1	3	FIMI: 3× Platinum; PROMUSICAE: Platinum; RIAA: 4× Platinum (Latin); SNEP: Gold	Final

== Music videos ==
Title	Other performer(s)	Album	Year
"Estoy Esperando"		The Noise: The Beginning	2001
"Baila Conmigo"		Desafío	2003
"Hay Algo En Ti"		Más Flow	2003
"No Sé Cómo Empezar"		Innovando	2003
"Me Pones En Tensión"		The Noise: La Biografía	2004
"Doncella"		Motivando a la Yal	2004
"Bandida"		Motivando a la Yal	2004
"Y Vas Caminando"		Los Cazadores: Primera Busqueda	2005
"Don't Stop"		Motivando a la Yal: Special Edition	2005
"Pégate"	Jomar	The Impact	2005
"Eres Bonita"		Contra Todos	2005
"Amor Genuino"		Pasado, Presente & Futuro	2009
"¿Cómo Curar?"		Los Verdaderos	2010
"Hoy Lo Siento"	Tony Dize	Los Verdaderos	2010
"Única y Especial"		La Fórmula	2012
"La Botella"		Los Diamantes Negros	2014
"Solo Tú"		Sentimiento de un Artista	2014
"La Botella" (Remix)	Naldo Benny	Non-album single	2014
"Pierdo La Cabeza"		Non-album single	2015
"Ganas de Ti"		Melodías de Oro	2015
"Embriágame"		Motivan2	2016
"Otra Vez"	J Balvin	Motivan2	2016

=== Featured music videos ===
Title	Other performer(s)	Album	Year
"Los 12 Discípulos"	Eddie Dee, Gallego, Vico C, Tego Calderón, Julio Voltio, Daddy Yankee, Ivy Queen, Johnny Prez and Wiso G	12 Discípulos	2004
"Te Invitan al Party"	L.D.A.	Chosen Few II: El Documental	2006
"Dime Baby"	Fusion Mobb	Non-album single	2009
"Calor"	Cheka	Double Trouble	2010
"Si No Le Contesto" (Remix)	Plan B and Tony Dize	Exclusive Urban Remixes	2010
"Vuelve" (Remix)	Buxxi	Non-album single	2012
"La Fórmula Sigue"	Arcángel, Plan B and R.K.M. & Ken-Y	La Fórmula	2012
"Diosa de los Corazones"	R.K.M. & Ken-Y, Arcángel and Lobo	La Fórmula	2012
"Kamasutra"	Poeta Callejero	Hagan Sus Diligencias, Parte 2	2013
"Dulce Carita"	Dálmata	Dálmata Collection	2015
"Bailar Contigo"	Mackie	Iluminado	2016
"La Dueña de tu Amor"	Marala	TBA	2016
"¿Qué Gano Olvidándote?" (Remix)	Reik	TBA	2016
"Te Quiero Pa' Mí"	Don Omar	TBA	2017
"Súbeme La Radio"	Enrique Iglesias and Descemer Bueno	Final	2017
"Reggaetón Lento" (Remix)	CNCO	TBA	2017

== Album appearances ==
- The Noise: The Beginning (2001)
- Reggaeton Sex Crew (2001)
- The GodFather (2002)
- Planet Reggae (2002)
- Los Matadores Del Género (2002)
- DJ Eric - La Industria All Star 2 (2002)
- Desafio (2003)
- Ground Zero: El Nuevo Comienzo (2003)
- Mr. Goldy: El Desorden (2003)
- The Score (2003)
- Los Mozalbetes (2003)
- MVP (2003)
- DJ Anquiera: Innovando (2003)
- Warriors Vol. 4: Los 14 Guerreros (2003)
- Blin Blin Vol. 1 (2003)
- DJ Nelson Presenta: Luny Tunes & Noriega - Mas Flow (2003)
- Gargolas Vol. 4 (2003)

== Zion solo ==
Zion discography
- Studio albums: 1
- Singles: 6
- Music videos: 8

Felix Gerardo Ortiz Torres (born August 5, 1981), known by his stage name Zion, is a Puerto Rican singer-songwriter. Despite spending almost his entire career in a duo with Lennox, Zion had a short solo period between 2006 and 2007, in which he released The Perfect Melody. The album was certified Platinum (Latin) by the Recording Industry Association of America (RIAA) for surpassing 100,000 sales in the United States. After returning from his duo hiatus with Lennox, Zion had occasional guest appearances as soloist from 2008 to 2016.

His solo discography consists of a studio album, six singles and eight music videos.

Title	Album details	Peak chart positions			Certifications (sales thresholds)
Title	Album details	US	US Latin	US Rap	Certifications (sales thresholds)
The Perfect Melody	Release: June 5, 2007; Label: Coalition, Universal Latin	53	2	7	RIAA: Platinum (Latin)

=== Singles ===
Title	Year	Peak chart positions			Album
Title	Year	US	US Latin	US Tropical	Album
"Alócate"	2006	—	26	—	Más Flow: Los Benjamins
"Fantasma"	2006	—	22	5	The Perfect Melody
"The Way She Moves" (featuring Akon)	2007	(Note: "The Way She Moves" did not enter the Billboard Hot 100 chart but peaked on the Bubbling Under Hot 100 chart at number 21.)	11	13	The Perfect Melody
"Zun Da Da"	2007	—	12	11	The Perfect Melody
"Amor de Pobre" (featuring Eddie Dee)	2007	—	(Note: "The Way She Moves" did not enter the Billboard Hot Latin Songs chart but peaked on the Latin Rhythm Airplay chart at number 25.)	35	The Perfect Melody
More (with Ken-Y featuring Jory)	2012	—	16	16	La Fórmula

==== Other charted songs ====
Title	Year	Peak chart positions		Album
Title	Year	US Latin Rhythm	US Tropical	Album
"Dos Jueyes" (with Domingo Quiñones)	2006	—	38	Los Cocorocos
"Te Vas"	2007	31	—	The Perfect Melody

==== Featured singles ====
Title	Year	Peak chart positions			Album
Title	Year	US	US Latin	US Tropical	Album
"Noche de Entierro (Nuestro Amor)" (with Tony Tun Tun, Wisin & Yandel, Héctor el Father and Daddy Yankee)	2006	(Note: "Noche de Entierro" did not enter the Billboard Hot 100 chart but peaked on the Bubbling Under Hot 100 chart at number 23.)	6	4	Más Flow: Los Benjamins

=== Music videos ===
Title	Other performer(s)	Album	Year
"Yo Voy a Llegar"		Flow La Discoteka	2004
"Alócate"		Más Flow: Los Benjamins	2006
"Fantasma"		The Perfect Melody	2006
"The Way She Moves"	Akon	The Perfect Melody	2007
"Zun Da Da"		The Perfect Melody	2007
"Amor de Pobre"	Eddie Dee	The Perfect Melody	2007
"More"	Jory and Ken-Y	La Fórmula	2012
"Ella Me Dice"	Arcángel	La Fórmula	2013

==== Featured music videos ====
Title	Other performer(s)	Album	Year
"¿Quién Más Que Yo?"	Cheka	La Película	2004
"Si Te Vas"	Kartier	The Mixtape, Vol. 1	2004
"Fuera del Planeta" (Remix)	Eloy and Jowell & Randy	The One Dollar Mixtape	2008
"Actúa" (Remix)	J Álvarez and De La Ghetto	El Imperio Nazza: J Álvarez Edition	2013
"Mírala"	De La Ghetto and Farruko	Geezy Boyz	2014
"Un Beso"	Mauricio Rivera	Cu4tro	2015
"Quédate Conmigo" (Remix)	Jory and Wisin	Matando La Liga	2015
"Caile"	Bad Bunny, Bryant Myers and De La Ghetto	TBA	2016

=== Album appearances ===
Year (Note: Year denotes the album's release. Some tracks may have been released another year prior to the album.)	Title	Album
2004	"Yo Voy a Llegar"	Flow La Discoteka
2004	"¿Quién Más Que Yo?" (with Cheka)	La Película
2004	"Si Te Vas" (with Kartier)	The Mixtape, Vol. 1
2005	"No Vamos a Parar" (with Julio Voltio)	Voltio
2005	"Ven Pégate" (with Arcángel & De La Ghetto)	Sangre Nueva
2006	"Not Too Much" (with Don Omar)	King of Kings
2006	"Royal Rumble (Se Van)" (with Wise, Daddy Yankee, Wisin, Héctor el Father, Yomo, Franco El Gorila, Don Omar, Arcángel and Alexis)	Más Flow: Los Benjamins
2006	"Hello"	Más Flow: Los Benjamins
2006	"Noche de Entierro (Nuestro Amor)" (with Tony Tun Tun, Wisin & Yandel, Héctor el Father and Daddy Yankee)	Más Flow: Los Benjamins
2006	"Alócate"	Más Flow: Los Benjamins
2006	"Sigue Ahí" (with De La Ghetto and Memphis Bleek)	Los Rompe Discotekas
2006	"Vente Mami" (with N.O.R.E. and Pharrell Williams)	N.O.R.E. y la Familia...Ya Tú Sabe
2006	"Dos Jueyes" (with Domingo Quiñones)	Los Cocorocos
2007	"Dile" (with M.J.)	Los Benjamins: La Continuación
2008	"Showtime" (with Angel & Khriz)	Showtime
2008	"Se Fue" (with M.J.)	Mi Sentimiento
2008	"Independiente"	Los Bravos: Reloaded
2008	"Fuera del Planeta" (Remix with Eloy and Jowell & Randy)	The One Dollar Mixtape
2010	"Nadie Te Amará Como Yo" (Remix with Dyland & Lenny and Arcángel)	My World
2012	"More" (with Jory and Ken-Y)	La Fórmula
2012	"Ella Me Dice" (with Arcángel)	La Fórmula
2012	"Sé Real" (with Luigi 21 Plus)	El Patán
2012	"Acéptame Así" (with D.Ozi)	Torre de Control
2013	"Actúa" (Remix with J Álvarez and De La Ghetto)	El Imperio Nazza: J Álvarez Edition
2014	"Tu Cuerpo Pide Sexo" (with Wisin)	El Regreso del Sobreviviente
2014	"Quiere Llegar" (with J Álvarez)	De Camino Pa' La Cima
2014	"Mírala" (with De La Ghetto and Farruko)	Geezy Boyz
2014	"¿Dónde Están?" (with Big Boy, Franco El Gorila, Farruko, J Álvarez, Arcángel and Luigi 21 Plus)	La Makinaria, Vol. 1
2015	"Un Beso" (with Mauricio Rivera)	Cu4tro
2015	"Quédate Conmigo" (with Jory and Wisin)	Matando La Liga
2016	"Pa'l Piso" (with Element Black)	Deluxe Edition
2016	"Te Vas a Quedar" (with J Álvarez, Farruko and Mackie)	Los Que Gustan

=== Other non-album guest appearances ===
Year	Title	Notes
2014	"Como Yo Le Doy" (with Don Miguelo and J Álvarez)	Remix
2014	"Tremenda Sata" (with Arcángel, Ñejo, Luigi 21 Plus, Ñengo Flow, Farruko, Daddy Yankee, De La Ghetto and J Balvin)	Remix
2015	"Estás Aquí" (with Nicky Jam, Daddy Yankee and J Álvarez)	
2015	"Ginza" (with J Balvin, De La Ghetto, Arcángel, Daddy Yankee, Nicky Jam, Farruko and Yandel)	Remix
2015	"Duele" (with El Sica)	
2016	"Alerta Roja" (with Daddy Yankee, Nicky Jam, Arcángel, De La Ghetto, El Micha, Plan B, J Balvin, Farruko, Cosculluela, Brytiago, Alexio, Mozart La Para, Secreto and Gente de Zona)	
2017	"La Ocasión" (with Nicky Jam, Ozuna, Daddy Yankee, Arcángel, Anuel AA, Farruko, J Balvin and De La Ghetto)	Remix
