= List of awards and nominations received by Zion & Lennox =

Zion & Lennox awards and nominations
Awards and nominations
Award	Wins	Nominations
Billboard Latin Music Awards	6	10
Latin American Music Awards	0	3
Latin Music Italian Awards	0	4
Lo Nuestro Awards	0	3
Premios Tu Mundo	0	1

Totals (Note: Certain award groups do not simply award one winner. They acknowledge several different recipients, have runners-up, and have third place. Since this is a specific recognition and is different from losing an award, runner-up mentions are considered wins in this award tally. For simplification and to avoid errors, each award in this list has been presumed to have had a prior nomination.)
- Wins: 14
- Nominations: 22

Felix Gerardo Ortiz Torres (born August 5, 1981) and Gabriel Pizarro (born December 10, 1980), known by their stage name Zion & Lennox, are Puerto Rican reggaeton singers, rappers and songwriters. Both artists were born in Carolina, Puerto Rico, were the duo was originated in 2000. They were part of the reggaeton underground scene until 2004, year in which they released their first studio album, Motivando a la Yal, under White Lion Records. The production's success was later influenced by Daddy Yankee's Barrio Fino, which led reggaeton to mainstream audiences. Also the track "Ahora" featuring Angel Doze was included into the video game FIFA Football 2005 soundtrack.

In 2007, the duo decided to have a short hiatus period and they released their respectives studio albums as soloists: The Perfect Melody (Zion) and Los Mero Meros (Lennox). Three years later, they signed in Pina Records and released their second studio album, Los Verdaderos, the same year and also participated on the label's album La Fórmula in 2012. Four years later, the duo released their third studio album, Motivan2, under their own label, Baby Records, and also Warner Music Latina. Throughout their career, Zion & Lennox explored different music genres, such as reggaeton, hip hop, latin pop, electropop, contemporary R&B and dancehall.

== Awards and nominations ==
Award/organization	Year	Nominee/work	Category	Result	Ref.
American Society of Composers, Authors and Publishers	2006	"Yo Voy"	Latin Award-Winning Urban Songs	Recipient	
American Society of Composers, Authors and Publishers	2010	"Mi Cama Huele A Ti"	Latin Award-Winning Urban Songs	Recipient	
American Society of Composers, Authors and Publishers	2013	"Diosa de los Corazones"	Latin Award-Winning Urban Songs	Recipient	
American Society of Composers, Authors and Publishers	2016	"Pierdo La Cabeza"	Latin Award-Winning Urban Songs	Recipient	
American Society of Composers, Authors and Publishers	2017	"Embriágame"	Latin Award-Winning Urban Songs	Recipient	
American Society of Composers, Authors and Publishers	2017	"Ganas de Ti"	Latin Award-Winning Urban Songs	Recipient	
American Society of Composers, Authors and Publishers	2017	"Otra Vez"	Latin Award-Winning Urban Songs	Recipient	
Billboard Latin Music Awards	2005	"Los 12 Discípulos"	Tropical Airplay Track Of The Year, New Artist	Nominated	
Billboard Latin Music Awards	2010	"Mi Cama Huele A Ti"	Hot Latin Song of the Year, Vocal Event	Nominated	
Billboard Latin Music Awards	2011	Themselves	Latin Rhythm Airplay Artist of the Year, Duo or Group	Nominated	
Billboard Latin Music Awards	2015	Themselves	Latin Rhythm Songs Artist of the Year, Duo or Group	Nominated	
Billboard Latin Music Awards	2016	"Pierdo La Cabeza"	Latin Rhythm Airplay Song of the Year	Nominated	
Billboard Latin Music Awards	2016	"Pierdo La Cabeza"	Airplay Song of the Year	Nominated	
Billboard Latin Music Awards	2016	Themselves	Latin Rhythm Songs Artist of the Year, Duo or Group	Won	
Billboard Latin Music Awards	2017	Themselves	Hot Latin Songs Artist of the Year, Duo or Group	Nominated	
Billboard Latin Music Awards	2017	Themselves	Latin Rhythm Songs Artist of the Year, Duo or Group	Won	
Billboard Latin Music Awards	2017	Themselves	Latin Rhythm Albums Artist of the Year, Duo or Group	Won	
Billboard Latin Music Awards	2018	Themselves	Hot Latin Songs Artist of the Year, Duo or Group	Nominated	
Billboard Latin Music Awards	2018	Themselves	Latin Rhythm Artist of the Year, Duo or Group	Nominated	
Billboard Latin Music Awards	2018	"Subeme La Radio"	Latin Pop Song of the Year	Nominated	
Billboard Latin Music Awards	2018	Motivan2	Latin Rhythm Album of the Year	Nominated	
Billboard Latin Music Awards	2019	Themselves	Hot Latin Songs Artist of the Year, Duo or Group	Nominated	
Billboard Latin Music Awards	2019	Themselves	Latin Rhythm Artist of the Year, Duo or Group	Nominated	
Billboard Latin Music Awards	2020	Themselves	Latin Rhythm Artist of the Year, Duo or Group	Nominated	
Billboard Latin Music Awards	2021	Themselves	Latin Rhythm Artist of the Year, Duo or Group	Nominated	
Billboard Latin Music Awards	2022	Themselves	Latin Rhythm Artist of the Year, Duo or Group	Nominated	
Billboard Latin Music Awards	2023	Themselves	Latin Rhythm Artist of the Year, Duo or Group	Nominated	
Heat Latin Music Awards	2017	Themselves	Best Urban Artist	Nominated	
Latin American Music Awards	2015	Themselves	Favorite Urban Duo or Group	Nominated	
Latin American Music Awards	2015	"Pierdo La Cabeza"	Favorite Urban Song	Nominated	
Latin American Music Awards	2016	Themselves	Favorite Urban Duo or Group	Nominated	
Latin Music Italian Awards	2016	Themselves	Best Latin Group of the Year	Nominated	
Latin Music Italian Awards	2016	Motivan2	Best Latin Male Album of the Year	Nominated	
Latin Music Italian Awards	2016	"Otra Vez"	Best Latin Collaboration of the Year	Nominated	
Latin Music Italian Awards	2016	"Otra Vez"	Best Latin Urban Song of the Year	Nominated	
Lo Nuestro Awards	2011	"Mi Cama Huele A Ti" (with Tito El Bambino)	Collaboration of the Year	Nominated	
Lo Nuestro Awards	2016	"Pierdo La Cabeza"	Urban Song of the Year	Nominated	
Lo Nuestro Awards	2017	Themselves	Urban Artist of the Year	Nominated	
Lo Nuestro Awards	2017	Themselves	Group of Duo of the Year	Nominated	
Lo Nuestro Awards	2021	"Vallenato Apretao" (with Silvestre Dangond)	Tropical Collaboration of the Year	Nominated	
Lo Nuestro Awards	2022	"Loco" (with Justin Quiles & Chimbala)	Urban Song of the Year	Nominated	
Lo Nuestro Awards	2023	"Berlín" (with María Becerra)	Urban Dance/Pop Song of the Year	Nominated	
Lo Nuestro Awards	2024	"Berlín" (with María Becerra)	Urban/Pop Collaboration of the Year	Nominated	
Lo Nuestro Awards	2024	"Berlín" (with María Becerra)	Urban Dance/Pop Song of the Year	Nominated	
Lo Nuestro Awards	2025	"Para Siempre" (with Anuel AA)	Urban Collaboration of the Year	Nominated	
Megaton Awards	2005	Themselves	Reggaeton Duet or Group Artist of the Year	Won	
Premios Tu Mundo	2015	"Pierdo La Cabeza"	Party-Starter Song	Nominated	
Premios Tu Música Urbano	2019	Themselves	Urban Artist Duo or Group of the Year	Won	
Premios Tu Música Urbano	2019	"No Es Justo" (with J Balvin)	International Video of the Year	Nominated	
Premios Tu Música Urbano	2019	"No Es Justo" (with J Balvin)	Song of the Year Duo or Group	Nominated	
Premios Tu Música Urbano	2020	Themselves	Top Artist - Duo or Group	Nominated	
Premios Tu Música Urbano	2020	"Sistema"	Top Song - Duo or Group	Nominated	
Premios Tu Música Urbano	2020	"Mi Error (Remix)" (with Eladio Carrion, Wisin & Yandel & Lunay)	New Generation Remix of the Year	Nominated	
Premios Tu Música Urbano	2022	Themselves	Top Artist - Duo or Group	Nominated	
Premios Tu Música Urbano	2022	"Loco" (with Justin Quiles & Chimbala)	Top Song - Tropical Urban	Nominated	
Premios Tu Música Urbano	2023	Themselves	Top Artist - Duo or Group	Nominated	
Premios Tu Música Urbano	2023	"Berlín" (with María Becerra)	Song of the Year - Duo or Group	Nominated	
Premios Tu Música Urbano	2023	"Desnúdate"	Top Song - Tropical Urban	Nominated	
