= 14F =

2015 compilation album by Wise

Compilation album by Wise
- Released: July 14, 2015
- Recorded: 2014–15
- Genre: Reggaeton
- Length: 58:06
- Labels: Gold Pen; VIP
- Producers: Wise (exec.), DJ Luian, Alex Killer, Little Genius, Yazid, Predikador, Noize, Santana, Young Hollywood, Muekka, Mambo Kingz, Hi-Flow, Los Evo Jedis, Los Metálicoz

Wise chronology
The Gold Pen (2014)	14F (2015)

Singles from 14F
- 1. "Baby Boo" Released: February 6, 2015

14F is the fourth compilation album and eight overall of reggaeton singer-songwriter and producer Wise (also known as Wise The Gold Pen, and formerly as Wise Da' Gangsta), who wrote all tracks and sang in two of them, this time accompanied by DJ Luian, who produced the entire album, with some work by Alex Killer, Little Genius, Yazid, Predikador, Noize, Santana, Young Hollywood, Muekka, Mambo Kingz, Hi-Flow and Los Metálicoz. The album was released on July 14, 2014 through Wise's Gold Pen Records and VIP Music Records, and his title refers to February the 14th: Valentine's Day, so the entire production is about romantic themes. It features Farruko, Arcángel, Zion & Lennox, De La Ghetto, Ñengo Flow, Jory, Maluma, Ken-Y, Baby Rasta & Gringo, J Álvarez, Cosculluela, Randy, Pusho, Luigi 21 Plus, Yomo, Gotay, Genio and Alexa, who performs in his respective songs. The album was scheduled to be released on March 14, 2015, but was postponed for unknown reasons. On its first day, it reached the top position on sales in the Latin ranking of iTunes, above other albums including Formula, Vol. 2 by Romeo Santos, The Last Don 2 by Don Omar, and Dale by Pitbull. It peaked at No.8 on Amazon's best sellers Latin albums ranking, and was also downloaded more than 195,000 times on the website ElGénero.com.

== Background ==
Wise's most recent production was his studio album The Gold Pen, released in 2014, featuring Héctor el Father, Zion & Lennox, Victor Manuelle, among others, including four singles: "La Calle No Juega" featuring Ñengo Flow, "Amores Como El Tuyo" featuring Ken-Y, "Fin De Semana" featuring Baby Rasta & Gringo, and "Bam Bam". Wise is known for his work as songwriter, being the author of hit songs including "Mayor Que Yo" (2005), "Noche de Entierro (Nuestro Amor)" (2006), "Down" (2006), "Zun Da Da" (2007), "Te Regalo Amores" (2008), "Hoy Lo Siento" (2010), "Pierdo La Cabeza" (2014), and others. In 2013, he signed with Broadcast Music, Inc. (BMI), one of the three United States performing rights organizations, who awarded Wise in 2015 because of his work as writer of "Prometo Olvidarte" (2014), performed by Tony Dize.

== Production ==
14F was recorded between 2014 and 2015, written entirely by Wise and produced by DJ Luian with work from other producers in some tracks. The album was announced in December 2014, presenting a different cover than the used one in the final product, and the official track list was announced in June 2015. Between those months, the artists who participate in the compilation announced their participation and demonstrated his interest and support in it. It has only one single, «Baby Boo», released in February 2015 and performed by Cosculluela. His music video was released in April 2015 in both Wise and Cosculluela official YouTube channels, with approximately 9 million views mixing both videos. A remix featuring Wisin, Daddy Yankee and Arcángel was released on July 18, 2015.

"During my entire career as songwriter I lived the bless of watching how the public dedicate my songs through the years. Thankful of all that I decided to make this product called 14F in which the public will have fourteen tracks to dedicate. Being one of the most important proyects in my career, I decided to recruit the bigger artists in the urban genre, starting with DJ Luian, the most famous reggaeton DJ as the captain of this big boat. I'm glad to have him into my plans, who became a brother and a good friend. The way to make productions will take another turn and we promise to direct it for a long time."

— Wise, March 2015.

Regarding the track list, is the first time that Wise writes for Farruko, De La Ghetto, Jory, Ñengo Flow, Maluma, Baby Rasta & Gringo, J Álvarez, Cosculluela, Pusho, Yomo and Genio. It is the second time that he writes for Arcángel, being "Lentamente" (2013, Sentimiento, Elegancia & Maldad) his first work with him, while is the third time that he writes for Ken-Y, with his hit songs "Down" (2006, Masterpiece) and "Te Regalo Amores" (2008, The Royalty) as his other works with the singer, when Ken-Y was part of his former duo R.K.M & Ken-Y. Finally, is the fourth time that Wise writes for Zion & Lennox, being his songs "Boom Boom" (2009, Pasado, Presente & Futuro), "Hoy Lo Siento" (2010, Los Verdaderos) and "Pierdo La Cabeza" (2014, Motivan2) his other works for the duo; while is the seventh time that he writes for Zion, because of his work as author of "Hello" (2006, Mas Flow: Los Benjamins), "Zun Da Da" and "Te Vas" (both in 2007, The Perfect Melody), with Zion as soloist.

== Commercial performance ==
14F managed to reach the top position on iTunes' Latin albums ranking, as well as peaking at No. 8 on Amazon's Latin best seller albums after, a day of its release. The album peaked at No. 9 on Billboard's Latin Rhythm Albums chart on the issue dated August 8, 2015 and spent three weeks charting. Its only single, Baby Boo, performed by Cosculluela, peaked at No. 20 on Billboard's Latin Rhythm Airplay chart and spent ten consecutive weeks there.

== Track listing ==
All lyrics are written by Gabriel "Wise" Cruz; all music is composed by DJ Luian (co-produced when noted).

No.	Title	Music	Performer	Length
1.	"Bye Bye"		Farruko	3:57
2.	"Me Dejo Llevar"	Little Genius	Arcángel	2:53
3.	"En La Nada"	Alex Killer and Yazid	Zion & Lennox	4:13
4.	"Necesito De Ti"	Predikador	De La Ghetto	3:42
5.	"Periódico De Ayer"	Alex Killer and Noize	Jory and Ñengo Flow	3:47
6.	"Mi Ángel"		Maluma and Ken-Y	3:35
7.	"Ay Ay Ay"	Santana	Baby Rasta & Gringo	4:00
8.	"Él No Estará A Mi Nivel"	Alex Killer	J Alvarez	3:18
9.	"Baby Boo"	Young Hollywood and Muekka	Cosculluela	3:36
10.	"Envejecer Conmigo"	Mambo Kingz	Randy	3:10
11.	"No Lo Deseas Na"	Alex Killer	Pusho	3:15
12.	"Decisiones"	Little Genius	Luigi 21 Plus and Arcángel	3:14
13.	"No Reciclo Amores"	Hi-Flow and Noize	Yomo	4:33
14.	"Déjate Llevar"	Los Evo Jedis	Wise and Gotay	3:34
15.	"Si Te Vas"	Los Metálicoz	Genio	4:06
16.	"Sin Ti"		Wise and Alexa	3:26
Total length:				58:06

== Charts ==
Album

Chart (2015)	Peak position
US Latin Rhythm Albums (Billboard)	9

Songs

Song	Chart	Peak position
"Baby Boo"	US Latin Rhythm Airplay (Billboard)	20
