= Tainy =

Puerto Rican record producer (born 1989)

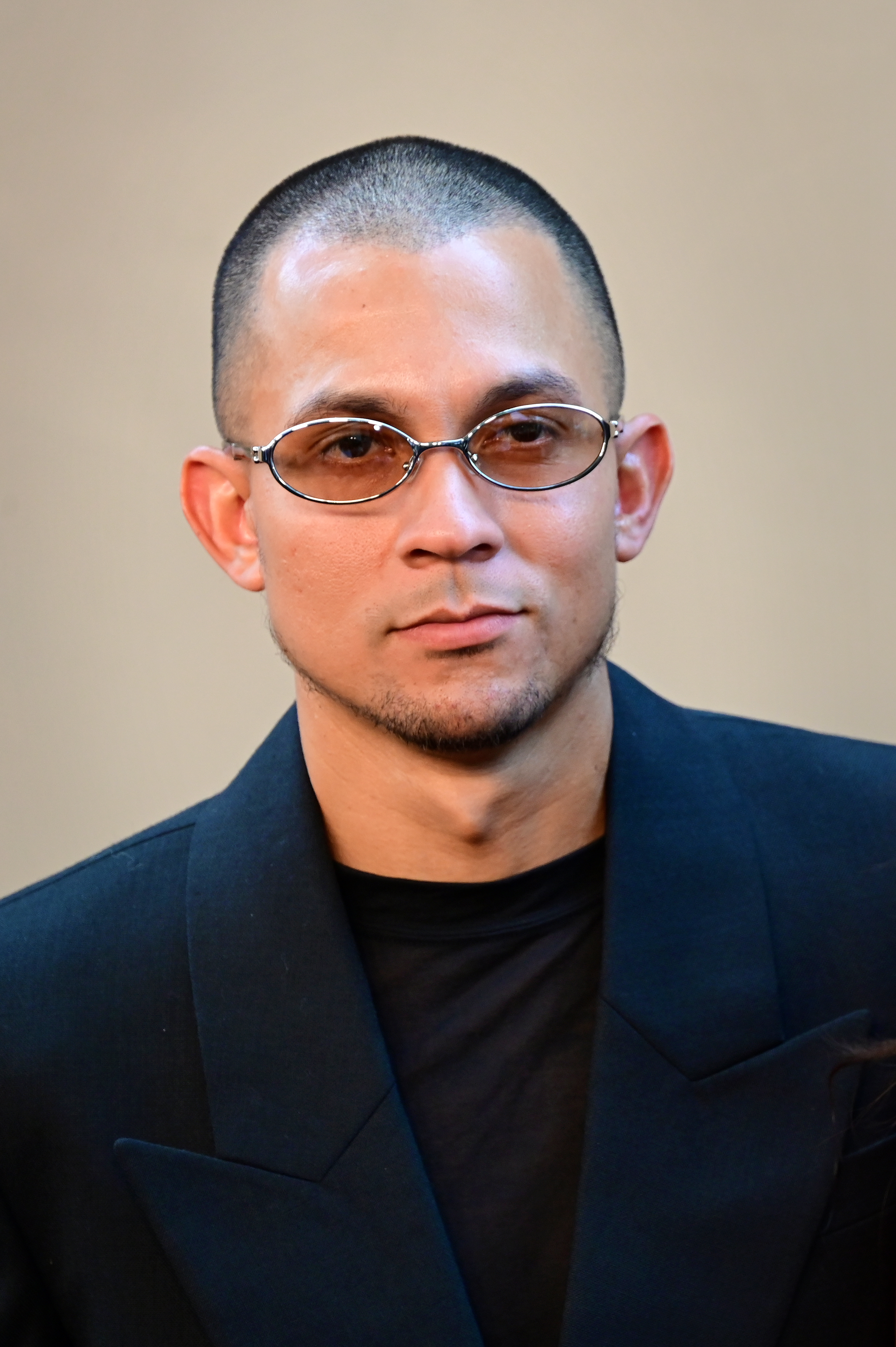
- Tainy in 2026

Background information
- Also known as: Tainy Tunes
- Born: Marco Efraín Masís Fernández; August 9, 1989 (age 37); San Juan, Puerto Rico
- Genre: Reggaeton
- Occupations: Record producer; songwriter; recording engineer
- Years active: 2003–present
- Labels: Mas Flow; Machete; Artillery; WY; Roc Nation; Interscope; Neon16; Republic
- Website: tainy.com

Marco Efraín Masís Fernández (Latin American Spanish: [ˈmaɾko efraˈim maˈsis feɾˈnandes]; born August 9, 1989), known professionally as Tainy, is a Puerto Rican record producer, songwriter and recording engineer. Born and raised in San Juan, Puerto Rico, he entered the world of reggaeton with his work on Mas Flow 2 by Luny Tunes. A repeated Grammy and BMI Award winner, Tainy has produced for artists including Wisin & Yandel, Janet Jackson, and Jennifer Lopez. His debut EP, Neon16 Tape: The Kids That Grew Up on Reggaeton (2020), consists of tracks with several other artists.

== Life and career ==
Marco Efraín Masís Fernández was born on August 9, 1989, in San Juan, Puerto Rico, to a Puerto Rican father and Dominican mother, María Fernández. He has a younger brother, Michael Bryan, who is also a record producer, who goes by the stage name "Mvsis". Masís affirmed in an interview that he used to hear Juan Luis Guerra in his childhood, and that over time he began taking interest in classic rock and rap, with additional inspiration from R&B artists and producers like Timbaland and the Neptunes.

After meeting with producer Nely el Arma Secreta, whom he met at a local church, Masís gave duo Luny Tunes a demo he made. Luny liked the demo and signed Masís to his team. When Masís was 15, Nely loaned him FL Studio XXL for producing. Masís practiced for a year until he learned. To test Tainy's potential, Luny had him work on a song. Luny ended up liking the song and used it for his album, Mas Flow 2.

Tainy and Luny produced the Los Benjamins album, producing 15 of the tracks. He has worked as a producer with Wisin & Yandel, Janet Jackson, Jennifer Lopez, Paris Hilton, Wise and many more.

He released his debut EP titled Neon16 Tape: The Kids That Grew Up on Reggaeton which consists of tracks with several other artists. The single "Nada" featuring Lauren Jauregui and C. Tangana was released on February 21, 2020.

=== Neon16 ===
In 2019, Tainy and music executive Lex Borrero teamed up to launch a company called Neon16. Described as a "multifaceted talent incubator", Neon16's label side has partnered with Interscope Records and currently have on their roster Puerto Rican artist Álvaro Díaz and Colombian artist Dylan Fuentes. Tainy stated:

To create Neon16 is a dream come true. I know Lex feels the same way. It gives our team a chance to continue to build and also shift the current state of our music.

Borrero said, "Our motto is 'Fear nothing, impact everything'. We want to work with talents who are willing to take creative risks in order to make a lasting impact. Tainy is the definition of our motto, he has been pushing the sounds of Latin music since the beginning of his legendary career."

== Discography ==
=== Studio albums ===
List of studio albums, with selected chart positions and certifications
Title	Album details	Peak chart positions			Certifications
Title	Album details	SPA	US	US Latin	Certifications
Dynasty (with Yandel)	Released: July 15, 2021; Label: Neon16, Y Entertainment, Roc Nation; Format: Digital download	49	—	25	RIAA: Gold (Latin)
Data	Released: June 29, 2023; Label: Neon16; Format: Digital download	1	11	2	PROMUSICAE: Platinum; RIAA: 6× Platinum (Latin)
"—" denotes a title that was not released or did not chart in that territory.

=== Compilation albums ===
List of compilation albums, with selected chart positions
Title	Album details	Peak chart positions	
Title	Album details	US	US Latin
Mas Flow: Los Benjamins (with Luny Tunes)	Released: September 26, 2006; Label: Mas Flow Inc., Machete Music; Format: Digital download	30	1

=== Extended plays ===
List of extended plays, with selected chart positions and certifications
Title	EP details	Peak chart positions		Certifications
Title	EP details	SPA	US Latin	Certifications
Neon16 Tape: The Kids that Grew Up on Reggaeton	Released: March 13, 2020; Label: Neon16, Y Entertainment, Roc Nation; Format: Digital download	95	49	AMPROFON: 2× Platinum+Gold

=== Singles ===
List of singles as lead artist, with selected chart positions and certifications, showing year released and album name
Title	Year	Peak chart positions										Certifications	Album
Title	Year	US	US Latin	ARG	COL	CAN	FRA	ITA	MEX	SPA	SWI	Certifications	Album
"I Can't Get Enough" (with Benny Blanco, Selena Gomez and J Balvin)	2019	66	—	100	—	33	91	53	—	41	28	RIAA: Gold; MC: 2× Platinum	I Said I Love You First
"Bárbaro" (with Mozart La Para)	2019	—	—	—	—	—	—	—	—	—	—		Non-album single
"Callaíta" (with Bad Bunny)	2019	52	2	9	—	—	140	50	24	1	57	FIMI: Gold; PROMUSICAE: 6× Platinum	Un Verano Sin Ti
"Adicto" (with Anuel AA and Ozuna)	2019	85	5	5	—	—	—	—	—	3	87	RIAA: Platinum; FIMI: Gold; PROMUSICAE: 2× Platinum	Non-album singles
"Feel It Too" (with Jessie Reyez and Tory Lanez)	2019	—	—	—	—	89	—	—	—	—	—		Non-album singles
"Mera" (with Dalex and Álvaro Díaz)	2020	—	—	—	—	—	—	—	—	—	—		Neon16 Tape: The Kids that Grew Up on Reggaeton
"Lento" (with Sean Paul, Mozart La Para and Cazzu)	2020	—	—	—	—	—	—	—	—	—	—		Neon16 Tape: The Kids that Grew Up on Reggaeton
"Nada" (with Lauren Jauregui and C. Tangana)	2020	—	—	—	—	—	—	—	—	51	—		Neon16 Tape: The Kids that Grew Up on Reggaeton
"Así Eh" (with Miky Woodz)	2020	—	—	—	—	—	—	—	—	—	—		Los 90 Piketes
"Lento" (with Lauren Jauregui)	2020	—	—	—	—	—	—	—	—	—	—		Non-album single
"Tu Amiga" (with Dylan Fuentes and Justin Quiles featuring Lennox and Llane)	2020	—	—	—	—	—	—	—	—	—	—		Neon16 Tape: The Kids that Grew Up on Reggaeton
"Si La Ves" (with Las Villa)	2020	—	—	—	—	—	—	—	—	—	—		Neon16 Tape: The Kids that Grew Up on Reggaeton
"Malos Hábitos" (with Kris Floyd)	2020	—	—	—	—	—	—	—	—	—	—		Neon16 Tape: The Kids that Grew Up on Reggaeton
"La Gatita" (with Lalo Ebratt)	2020	—	—	—	—	—	—	—	—	—	—		Non-album singles
"Mente" (with Dylan Fuentes and Mau y Ricky)	2020	—	—	—	—	—	—	—	—	—	—		Non-album singles
"Agua" (with J Balvin)	2020	— (Note: "Agua" did not enter the Billboard Hot 100 chart, but peaked at number five on the Billboard Bubbling Under Hot 100 chart.)	5	3	—	—	—	89	42	1	80	RIAA: Gold; PROMUSICAE: 2× Platinum	Sponge on the Run
"Un Día (One Day)" (with J Balvin, Dua Lipa and Bad Bunny)	2020	63	1	22	—	70	144	28	3	6	30	RIAA: 15× Platinum (Latin); AMPROFON: Diamond+4× Platinum+Gold; FIMI: Platinum; MC: Platinum; PROMUSICAE: 3× Platinum	Jose and Future Nostalgia: The Moonlight Edition
"Falta" (with DaniLeigh and Kris Floyd)	2020	—	—	—	—	—	—	—	—	—	—		Non-album single
"Deja Vu" (with Yandel)	2021	—	—	—	—	—	—	—	—	—	—	RIAA: Platinum (Latin)	Dynasty
"Si Te Vas" (with Yandel and Saint Jhn)	2021	—	—	—	—	—	—	—	—	—	—		Dynasty
"Una Más" (with Yandel and Rauw Alejandro)	2021	—	—	—	—	—	—	—	—	—	—	RIAA: Platinum (Latin)	Dynasty
"Summer of Love" (with Shawn Mendes)	2021	48	—	96	—	17	—	—	—	—	44		Non-album single
"Lo Siento BB:/" (with Bad Bunny and Julieta Venegas)	2021	51	2	—	9	—	—	—	1	5	—	RIAA: 31× Platinum (Latin); PROMUSICAE: Platinum	Data
"Oh Na Na" (with Myke Towers and Camila Cabello)	2021	—	20	—	—	—	—	—	—	51	—		Non-album single
"Sci-Fi" (with Rauw Alejandro)	2022	—	—	—	—	—	—	—	—	—	—		Data
"Obstáculo" (with Myke Towers)	2023	—	—	—	—	—	—	—	—	—	—		Data
"Fantasma/AVC" (with Jhayco)	2023	—	—	—	—	—	—	—	—	69	—	PROMUSICAE: Gold	Data
"La Baby" (with Daddy Yankee, Feid and Sech)	2023	—	47	—	—	—	—	—	—	36	—		Data
"Colmillo" (with J Balvin and Young Miko featuring Jowell & Randy)	2023	—	—	—	—	—	—	—	—	51	—		Data
"Monstruo" (with Feid)	2025	—	—	—	—	—	—	—	—	37	—		TBA
"Única" (with Karol G)	2025	—	—	—	—	—	—	—	—	—	—		TBA
"—" denotes a title that was not released or did not chart in that territory.

=== Other charted songs ===
List of other songs as lead artist, with selected chart positions and certifications, showing year released and album name
Title	Year	Peak chart positions					Certifications	Album
Title	Year	US	US Latin	COL	MEX	SPA	Certifications	Album
"Mojabi Ghost" (with Bad Bunny)	2023	57	9	15	17	14	PROMUSICAE: Platinum	Data
"Pasiempre" (with Arcángel, Jhayco, Arca, Myke Towers and Omar Courtz)	2023	— (Note: "Pasiempre" did not enter the Billboard Hot 100 chart, but peaked at number twenty on the Billboard Bubbling Under Hot 100 chart.)	28	18	—	32	PROMUSICAE: Gol	Data
"Volver" (with Rauw Alejandro, Skrillex and Four Tet)	2023	—	—	—	—	59		Data
"—" denotes a title that was not released or did not chart in that territory.

== Production discography ==
=== Albums ===
- 2005: Más Flow 2
- 2005: Motivando A La Yal: Special Edition
- 2005: Sangre Nueva
- 2005: La Moda
- 2006: Pa'l Mundo: Deluxe Edition
- 2006: Top of the Line
- 2006: Los Rompe Discotekas
- 2006: Luny Tunes & Tainy: Mas Flow: Los Benjamins
- 2006: The Bad Boy
- 2006: Los Vaqueros
- 2007: Luny Tunes & Tainy: Los Benjamins: La Continuación
- 2007: It's My Time
- 2007: Wisin vs. Yandel: Los Extraterrestres
- 2007: Sangre Nueva Special Edition
- 2007: The Perfect Melody
- 2007: El Cartel: The Big Boss
- 2007: Broke and Famous
- 2008: Semblante Urbano
- 2008: La Melodía de la Calle
- 2008: Los Extraterrestres: Otra Dimensión
- 2008: Talento de Barrio
- 2008: Luny Tunes Presents: Erre XI
- 2008: Masacre Musical
- 2008: El Fenómeno
- 2009: Down to Earth
- 2009: Welcome to the Jungle
- 2009: La Revolución
- 2009: The Last
- 2009: The Black Frequency - Los Yetzons
- 2009: La Melodia De La Calle: Updated
- 2009: La Evolución
- 2010: My World
- 2010: El Momento
- 2010: Drama Queen
- 2010: Los Verdaderos
- 2011: Los Vaqueros 2: El Regreso
- 2011: Música + Alma + Sexo
- 2011: Formula, Vol. 1
- 2012: Líderes
- 2012: La Fórmula
- 2013: Los Sucesores - J King & Maximan
- 2013: Geezy Boyz - De La Ghetto
- 2013: De Líder a Leyenda
- 2013: Sentimiento, Elegancia & Maldad
- 2014: Legacy
- 2014: El Regreso del Sobreviviente
- 2014: Love & Sex
- 2015: Legacy: De Líder a Leyenda Tour (EP)
- 2015: La Melodía de la Calle: 3rd Season
- 2015: The Last Don, Vol. 2
- 2015: La Artilleria Vol. 1
- 2015: Dangerous
- 2015: Revolucionario
- 2016: Alto Rango
- 2017: Update
- 2018: X 100pre
- 2019: Hurt by You
- 2019: Oasis
- 2020: The Kids That Grew Up on Reggaeton
- 2020: YHLQMDLG
- 2020: Emmanuel
- 2020: Sin Miedo (del Amor y Otros Demonios)
- 2020: Afrodisíaco
- 2021: De Una Vez
- 2021: Baila Conmigo
- 2021: Los Dioses
- 2021: Timelezz
- 2021: Las Leyendas Nunca Mueren
- 2021: Vice Versa (Rauw Alejandro album)
- 2022: Motomami
- 2022: Saturno (album)
- 2022: Un Verano Sin Ti
- 2023: Sentimiento, Elegancia y Más Maldad
- 2023: Nadie Sabe Lo Que Va a Pasar Mañana
- 2024: Manifesting 20-05
- 2024: Cosa Nuestra (Rauw Alejandro album)
- 2025: Debí Tirar Más Fotos

== Awards and nominations ==
He has received three Broadcast Music, Inc. (BMI) Awards, which are annually awarded to songwriters, composers and music publishers of the year's most-performed songs in the BMI catalog, for Wisin & Yandel's "Abusadora" and "Pam Pam" and Ivy Queen's "La Vida Es Así".

Award	Year	Nominated work	Category	Result	Ref.
Billboard Latin Music Awards	2020	"Callaíta" (with Bad Bunny)	Vocal Event Hot Latin Song of the Year	Nominated	
Billboard Latin Music Awards	2020	"Callaíta" (with Bad Bunny)	Hot Latin Song of the Year	Nominated	
Billboard Latin Music Awards	2020	"Callaíta" (with Bad Bunny)	Digital Song of the Year	Nominated	
Billboard Latin Music Awards	2020	"Callaíta" (with Bad Bunny)	Latin Rhythm Song of the Year	Nominated	
Billboard Latin Music Awards	2020	Tainy	Producer of the Year	Nominated	
Billboard Latin Music Awards	2021	Tainy	Producer of the Year	Won	
Billboard Latin Music Awards	2021	Tainy	Songwriter of the Year	Nominated	
Billboard Latin Music Awards	2022	Tainy	Songwriter of the Year	Nominated	
Billboard Latin Music Awards	2022	Tainy	Producer of the Year	Won	
Billboard Latin Music Awards	2024	Data	Latin Rhythm Album of the Year	Nominated	
Billboard Music Awards	2020	"Callaíta" (with Bad Bunny)	Top Latin Song	Nominated	
Grammy Awards	2019	"I Like It" (by Cardi B, Bad Bunny & J Balvin)	Record of the Year (Note: As producer.)	Nominated	
Grammy Awards	2021	"Un Día (One Day)" (with J Balvin, Bad Bunny & Dua Lipa)	Best Pop Duo/Group Performance	Nominated	
Grammy Awards	2023	Un Verano Sin Ti (by Bad Bunny)	Album of the Year	Nominated	
Grammy Awards	2023	Un Verano Sin Ti (by Bad Bunny)	Best Música Urbana Album	Won	
Grammy Awards	2024	Data	Best Música Urbana Album	Nominated	
Grammy Awards	2026	Debi Tirar Mas Fotos (by Bad Bunny)	Album of the Year	Won	
Heat Latin Music Awards	2022	"Lo Siento BB:/" (with Bad Bunny & Julieta Venegas)	Best Video	Nominated	
Heat Latin Music Awards	2024	Tainy	Producer of the Year	Nominated	
Heat Latin Music Awards	2026	Tainy	Producer of the Year	Pending	
Latin American Music Awards	2024	Data	Best Urban Album	Nominated	
Latin Grammy Awards	2009	"Abusadora" (by Wisin & Yandel)	Best Urban Song (Note: As songwriter.)	Won	
Latin Grammy Awards	2018	Vibras (by J Balvin)	Album of the Year	Nominated	
Latin Grammy Awards	2018	Vibras (by J Balvin)	Best Urban Music Album	Won	
Latin Grammy Awards	2019	X 100pre (by Bad Bunny)	Best Urban Music Album	Won	
Latin Grammy Awards	2019	"Querer Mejor" (by Juanes featuring Alessia Cara)	Record of the Year	Nominated	
Latin Grammy Awards	2019	"Querer Mejor" (by Juanes featuring Alessia Cara)	Song of the Year	Nominated	
Latin Grammy Awards	2019	Montaner (by Ricardo Montaner)	Best Engineered Album (Note: As recording engineer.)	Nominated	
Latin Grammy Awards	2020	Oasis (by J Balvin & Bad Bunny)	Album of the Year	Nominated	
Latin Grammy Awards	2020	"China" (by Anuel AA, Daddy Yankee, Karol G featuring Ozuna & J Balvin)	Record of the Year	Nominated	
Latin Grammy Awards	2020	"Adicto" (with Anuel AA & Ozuna)	Best Urban Song	Nominated	
Latin Grammy Awards	2021	El Último Tour del Mundo (by Bad Bunny)	Album of the Year	Nominated	
Latin Grammy Awards	2021	El Último Tour del Mundo (by Bad Bunny)	Best Urban Music Album	Won	
Latin Grammy Awards	2021	"Agua" (with J Balvin)	Song of the Year	Nominated	
Latin Grammy Awards	2021	"Agua" (with J Balvin)	Best Urban Song	Nominated	
Latin Grammy Awards	2021	"Dakiti" (by Bad Bunny & Jhayco)	Best Urban Song	Nominated	
Latin Grammy Awards	2022	Motomami (by Rosalía)	Album of the Year	Won	
Latin Grammy Awards	2022	Un Verano Sin Ti (by Bad Bunny)	Album of the Year	Nominated	
Latin Grammy Awards	2022	"LA FAMA" (by Rosalía & The Weeknd)	Record of the Year	Nominated	
Latin Grammy Awards	2022	"Ojitos Lindos" (by Bad Bunny & Bomba Estereo)	Record of the Year	Nominated	
Latin Grammy Awards	2022	"Lo Siento BB:/" (with Bad Bunny & Julieta Venegas)	Best Urban Song	Nominated	
Latin Grammy Awards	2022	"Lo Siento BB:/" (with Bad Bunny & Julieta Venegas)	Best Reggaeton Performance	Won	
Latin Grammy Awards	2022	Tainy	Producer of the Year	Nominated	
MTV Millennial Awards	2022	"Lo Siento BB:/" (with Bad Bunny & Julieta Venegas)	Viral Anthem	Nominated	
MTV Video Music Awards	2019	"I Can't Get Enough" (with Benny Blanco, Selena Gomez & J Balvin)	Best Latin	Nominated	
MTV Video Music Awards	2021	"Un Día (One Day)" (with J Balvin, Bad Bunny & Dua Lipa)	Best Latin	Nominated	
MTV Video Music Awards	2021	"Summer of Love" (with Shawn Mendes)	Song of the Summer	Nominated	
People's Choice Awards	2020	"Un Día (One Day)" (with J Balvin, Bad Bunny & Tainy)	Music Video of the Year	Nominated	
Premios Juventud	2019	"I Can't Get Enough" (with Benny Blanco, Selena Gomez & J Balvin)	This is a BTS (Behind the Scenes)	Nominated	
Premios Juventud	2020	Tainy	Producer you know by Shout-Out	Nominated	
Premios Juventud	2021	"Agua" (with J Balvin)	Song with the Best Collaboration	Nominated	
Premios Juventud	2021	"Un Día (One Day)" (with J Balvin, Bad Bunny & Tainy)	OMG Collaboration	Nominated	
Premios Juventud	2021	"Un Día (One Day)" (with J Balvin, Bad Bunny & Tainy)	Video with the Best Social Message	Won	
Premios Juventud	2022	"Oh Na Na" (with Camila Cabello & Myke Towers)	Collaboration OMG	Nominated	
Premios Juventud	2022	Tainy	The Best "Beatmakers"	Nominated	
Premios Juventud	2023	Tainy	The Best "Beatmakers"	Nominated	
Premios Juventud	2024	Tainy	The Best "Beatmakers"	Nominated	
Premios Lo Nuestro	2019	"Callaíta" (with Bad Bunny)	Urban/Trap Song of the Year	Won	
Premios Lo Nuestro	2020	"I Can't Get Enough" (with Benny Blanco, Selena Gomez & J Balvin)	Crossover Collaboration of the Year	Nominated	
Premios Lo Nuestro	2021	"Un Día (One Day)" (with J Balvin, Bad Bunny & Dua Lipa)	Crossover Collaboration of the Year	Won	
Premios Lo Nuestro	2023	"Lo Siento BB:/" with Bad Bunny & Julieta Venegas)	Urban Collaboration of the Year	Nominated	
Premios Tu Música Urbano	2020	"Callaita" (with Bad Bunny)	Song of the Year	Nominated	
Premios Tu Música Urbano	2020	"Callaita" (with Bad Bunny)	Male Song of the Year	Nominated	
Premios Tu Música Urbano	2020	"Adicto" (with Anuel AA & Ozuna)	Collaboration of the Year	Nominated	
Premios Tu Música Urbano	2022	"Lo Siento BB:/" (with Bad Bunny & Julieta Venegas)	Collaboration of the Year	Nominated	
Premios Tu Música Urbano	2023	Tainy	Top Music Producer	Nominated	
Rolling Stone en Español Awards	2023	Tainy	Music Producer of the Year	Won	
Rolling Stone en Español Awards	2023	Tainy	Pioneer Award	Won	
Spotify Awards	2020	"Callaíta" (with Bad Bunny)	Most Streamed Song	Won	
Spotify Awards	2020	"Callaíta" (with Bad Bunny)	Summer Song	Nominated	
