= Motivan2 =

Studio album by Zion & Lennox
- Released: September 30, 2016
- Recorded: 2015–2016
- Genre: Reggaeton
- Length: 70:53
- Label: Warner Music Latina
- Producer: Chris Jeday; Wichi; Urba & Romme; Onell Flow; Haze; Sky Rompiendo; Predikador; Jumbo; Alfonso Ordóñez; O'Neill; Montana; FrankFussion; Gaby Music

Zion & Lennox chronology
La Formula (2012)	Motivan2 (2016)	El Sistema (2021)

Singles from Motivan2
- 1. "Embriágame" Released: February 5, 2016; 2. "Otra Vez" Released: August 5, 2016; 3. "Mi Tesoro" Released: April 7, 2017

Motivan2 (Motivando a la Yal 2) is the third studio album by Puerto Rican duo Zion & Lennox, released on September 30, 2016, through Warner Music Latina. It is the sequel to Motivando a la Yal, It was produced by Chris Jeday, Wichi, Urba & Romme, Onell Flow, Haze, Sky Rompiendo, Predikador, Jumbo, Alfonso Ordóñez, O'Neill, Montana, FrankFussion and Gaby Music, and features collaborations with Nicky Jam, Plan B, J Balvin, Farruko, R. Kelly, Daddy Yankee, Maluma and Don Omar.

Commercially, Motivan2 is the duo's most successful album, it topped the Top Latin Albums chart, being their first and only number one album in the chart, it also peaked at number 155 at the Billboard 200 chart, being their only appearance in the chart. The album was certified platinum in United States and Colombia, and gold in Mexico. At the 2017 Billboard Latin Music Awards, the duo won Latin Rhythm Albums Artist of the Year, Duo or Group thanks to the success of the album, while the following year the album was nominated for Latin Rhythm Album of the Year.

== Background ==
In July 2013, during a concert Zion had a physical altercation with Rafael "Raphy" Pina, CEO of Pina Records, the label to which the duo was signed under at the time. Following the incident, the duo sued Pina over a breach of contract as well as various damages, and later created the label Baby Records, releasing the promotional single "La Botella" and announcing the release of an album. In 2014, they released "Pierdo la Cabeza", the song was commercially successful and marked a comeback for the duo. In 2015, the duo was signed to Warner Music Latina to release the album.

The album features a wide array of prominent reggaeton artist as guest features such as Daddy Yankee, Maluma, Don Omar and J Balvin, among others, Zion said that "they are the best in the urban world. Everyone was very happy to participate and the songs came out very naturally". About the album, Lennox said that "we tried to maintain the same essence as in our previous works, we were able to find more current sounds and more mature lyrics that can identify more with the public".

== Singles ==
The first single was "Embriágame", released on February 5, 2016. The song peaked at number three at the Latin Rhythm Airplay chart. A remix of the song featuring Puerto Rican singer Don Omar was released on July 1, 2016, this version was also included into the album was the final track. The second single was "Otra Vez" featuring Colombian singer J Balvin, released on August 5, 2016. The song peaked at number five at the Hot Latin Songs chart, being their highest appearance on the chart as main artist, it also peaked at number 23 at the Bubbling Under Hot 100 chart.

The third single was "Mi Tesoro" featuring Puerto Rican singer Nicky Jam, released on April 7, 2017. Both "Embriágame" and "Otra Vez" were certified platinum in Spain while "Mi Tesoro" was certified gold in the country. Additionally, "Otra Vez" was also certified platinum in Italy.

== Critical reception ==
Professional ratings
Review scores
Source	Rating
AllMusic	4/5 stars

Thom Jurek from AllMusic gave the album four out of five stars writing that the album was "loaded with stylistic diversity and guest appearances from top talent", he commented that "though there are a mammoth 18 tracks here, there isn't a filler tune in the bunch". He finished the review writing "this album uses their core sound in a rainbow of styles that reveal not only why reggaeton remains relevant in the 21st century, but offers proof of an evolution that may signal its next incarnation". Colombian magazine SHOCK placed the album at number eight in their list for "Best Latin American Albums of 2016".

=== Accolades ===
Accolades for Motivan2
Publication	Accolade	Rank
SHOCK	Best Latin American Albums of 2016	8

== Track listing ==
Motivan2 track listing
No.	Title	Writer(s)	Producer(s)	Length
1.	"Embriágame"	Félix Ortiz; Gabriel Pizarro; Carlos Ortiz Rivera; Juan G. Vazquez Rivera; Luis E. Ortiz Rivera; Eduardo Alfonso Vargas Berrios; Yazid Rivera	Chris Jeday; Wichi	3:39
2.	"Bailando Tú y Yo"	Ortiz; Pizarro; Gabriel Cruz Padilla (Wise); Yoel Damas	Urba & Romme	4:25
3.	"Mi Tesoro" (featuring Nicky Jam)	Ortiz; Pizarro; Ortiz Rivera; Vazquez Rivera; E. Ortiz Rivera; Nick Rivera Caminero	Chris Jeday; Wichi	4:06
4.	"Tú y Yo"	Ortiz; Pizarro; Cristofer Brian Montalvo Garcia; Freddy Montalvo; José Cruz; Nelson Onell Díaz; Roberto Martinez Lebron; Roberto Revol Martinez	Onell Flow	3:32
5.	"La Niña" (featuring Plan B)	Ortiz; Pizarro; Edwin Vázquez Vega; Orlando Javier Valle Vega; Egbert Rosa Cintrón	Haze	4:21
6.	"Ni un Minuto Más"	Ortiz; Pizarro; Ortiz Rivera; E. Ortiz Rivera; Edward Veras; Rivera; Vladimir Felix	Chris Jeday; Wichi	3:39
7.	"Otra Vez" (featuring J Balvin)	Ortiz; Pizarro; Alejandro Ramirez Suárez; José Álvaro Osorio Balvin; Rene David Cano Ríos	Sky Rompiendo	3:29
8.	"Reggae Reggae"	Ortiz; Pizarro; Vargas Berrios; Rivera; Victor Edmundo Delgado	Predikador	3:20
9.	"Qué Bien se Siente" (featuring Farruko)	Ortiz; Pizarro; Carlos Efrén Reyes Rosado; Víctor Viera Moore	Jumbo	4:43
10.	"El Tiempo" (featuring R. Kelly)	Ortiz; Pizarro; Alfonso Ordoñez; R. Kelly; Raymond Casillas	Alfonso Ordóñez; O'Neill	4:01
11.	"Me Voy" (performed by Zion)	Ortiz; Pizarro; Cruz Padilla; Damas; Luis J. Romero; Urbani Mota	Urba & Romme	4:49
12.	"Cierra los Ojos" (featuring Daddy Yankee)	Ortiz; Pizarro; E. Ortiz Rivera; Ortiz Rivera; José Torres; Ramon L. Ayala Rodríguez	Chris Jeday; Wichi	4:43
13.	"Dame tu Amor"	Ortiz; Pizarro; Vazquez Rivera; E. Ortiz Rivera; Vargas Berrios; Robin Mendez	Chris Jeday; Wichi	3:23
14.	"Nuestro Amor" (featuring Maluma)	Ortiz; Pizarro; Henry A. Moreno Castillo; Juan Luis Londoño	Urba & Romme	3:44
15.	"Una Nota"	Ortiz; Pizarro; Moreno Castillo; Alberto Lozada; Francisco Collazo Casiano; Rubén Cruz	Montana; FrankFussion	4:07
16.	"Prende en Fuego" (performed by Lennox)	Ortiz; Pizarro; Vazquez Rivera; Rivera; Viera Moore	Gaby Music; Jumbo	3:37
17.	"Se Puso Feo"	Ortiz; Pizarro; Cruz Padilla; Damas; Romero; Mota	Urba & Romme	3:16
18.	"Embriágame (Remix)" (featuring Don Omar)	Ortiz; Pizarro; Ortiz Rivera; Vazquez Rivera; E. Ortiz Rivera; Rivera; Vargas Berrios; William Omar Landron	Chris Jeday; Wichi	3:50
Total length:				70:53

== Credits ==
- Felix Ortiz (Zion) – lead artist (all except track 16), composer, executive producer (all tracks)
- Gabriel Pizarro (Lennox) – lead artist (all except track 11), composer, executive producer (all tracks)
- Chris Jeday – producer (tracks 1, 3, 6, 12, 13, 18), composer (tracks 1, 3, 6, 12, 18)
- Wichi – producer, composer (track 1, 3, 6, 12, 13, 18)
- Gaby Music – producer (track 16), composer (tracks 1, 3, 13, 16, 18), mixing, recording engineer
- Urba & Romme – producer (track 2, 11, 14, 17), composer (track 11, 17)
- Onell Flow – producer, composer (track 4)
- Sky Rompiendo – producer, composer (track 7)
- Predikador – producer, composer (track 8)
- Haze – producer, composer (track 5)
- Jumbo – producer, composer (tracks 9, 16)
- Alfonso Ordoñez – producer, composer (tracks 10)
- O'Neill – producer (track 10)
- Montana – producer, composer (track 15)
- FrankFussion – producer, composer (track 15)
- Yazid Rivera – composer (tracks 1, 6, 8, 16, 18)
- Eduardo Alfonso Vargas Berrios – composer (tracks 1, 8, 13, 18)
- Gabriel Cruz Padilla – composer (tracks 2, 11, 17)
- Yoel Damas – composer (tracks 2, 11, 17)
- Cristofer Brian Montalvo Garcia – composer (track 4)
- Freddy Montalvo – composer (track 4)
- José Cruz – composer (track 4)
- Roberto Martinez Lebron – composer (track 4), A&R
- Roberto Revol Martinez – composer (track 4)
- Edward Veras – composer (track 6)
- DJ Blass – composer (track 6)
- Rene David Cano Ríos – composer (track 7)
- Raymond Casillas – composer (track 10)
- José Torres – composer (track 12)
- Robin Mendez – composer (track 13)
- Henry A. Moreno Castillo – composer (tracks 14, 15)
- Rubén Cruz – composer (track 15)
- Mike Fuller – mastering
- Martin Betz – photography
- Nicky Jam – featured artist, composer (track 3)
- Plan B – featured artist, composer (track 5)
- J Balvin – featured artist, composer (track 7)
- Farruko – featured artist, composer (track 9)
- R. Kelly – featured artist, composer (track 10)
- Daddy Yankee – featured artist, composer (track 12)
- Maluma – featured artist, composer (track 14)
- Don Omar – featured artist, composer (track 18)

== Charts ==
=== Weekly charts ===
Weekly chart performance for Motivan2
Chart (2016)	Peak position
US Billboard 200	155
US Top Latin Albums (Billboard)	1
US Latin Rhythm Albums (Billboard)	1
US Top Current Album Sales (Billboard)	2

=== Year-end charts ===
Year-end chart performance for Motivan2
Chart (2016)	Position
US Latin Rhythm Albums (Billboard)	11
US Top Latin Albums (Billboard)	73
Chart (2017)	Position
US Latin Rhythm Albums (Billboard)	7
US Top Latin Albums (Billboard)	19
Chart (2018)	Position
US Latin Rhythm Albums (Billboard)	17
US Top Latin Albums (Billboard)	57

== Certifications ==
Certifications for Motivan2
Region	Certification	Certified units/sales
Colombia (ASINCOL)	Platinum	20,000
Mexico (AMPROFON)	Gold	30,000^{‡}
United States (RIAA)	Platinum (Latin)	60,000^{‡}
^{‡} Sales+streaming figures based on certification alone.
