= Los Cazadores: Primera Busqueda =

Compilation album by Various Artists
- Released: February 22, 2005
- Recorded: 2004
- Genre: Reggaetón, hip hop
- Length: 63:08
- Language: Spanish
- Label: Sony BMG, Platinum Entertainment
- Producer: DJ Adam, DJ Blass, DJ Jan, Maestro, DJ Majestic, Rafi Mercenario, Monserrate, Mr. G, Gran Omar, DJ Sonic, Sosa, Ivy Queen

Various Artists chronology
Los Cazadores: Primera Busqueda (2005)	Los Cazadores 2: Segunda Busqueda (2006)

Singles from Los Cazadores: Primera Busqueda
- 1. "La Cazadora" Released: February 2005

Los Cazadores: Primera Busqueda is a compilation album released by Sony BMG on February 22, 2005. The album features several artists from the reggaetón genre, such as Tito "El Bambino", Tego Calderón, Yaga & Mackie, Zion & Lennox, Nicky Jam, Ivy Queen, Notch, Jomar, Pedro Prez, Gammy, Rey Pirin, Guanabanas, Andy Boy, Maicol & Manuel and Dominic.

Production of the album was handled by DJ Adam, DJ Blass, DJ Jan, Maestro, DJ Majestic, Rafi Mercenario, Monserrate, Mr. G, DJ Sonic and Sosa. Upon release, the album peaked at number eight on the Billboard Latin Albums chart, number three on the Billboard Tropical Albums chart, and number two on the Billboard Reggae Albums chart.

Los Cazadores: Primera Busqueda spawned one single, "La Cazadora" performed by Tito "El Bambino". It reached number thirty-eight on the Billboard Latin Songs chart and number eight on the Billboard Tropical Songs chart. Due to the album's commercial success, a sequel was issued in 2006 entitled Los Cazadores 2: Segunda Busqueda.

== Background and composition ==
Prior to the album's release, many of the featured artist had already established themselves as some of the best in the genre. Tito "El Bambino" had made a name for himself while a part of the duo Hector & Tito. Before splitting in 2003, the duo won a Latin Billboard Music Award for "Latin Rap Album of the Year" for their 2002 effort A La Reconquista.

Tego Calderón, referred to by David Jeffries as "one of the foremost ambassadors of the reggaetón genre", had debuted with El Abayarde in 2003. The album was a commercial success managing 50,000 copies in its first month. In 2004, he followed the album up with El Enemy De Los Guasíbiri, "a punchier, more hectic, more street-level affair".

Yaga & Mackie formed in 2001 and appeared on various compilation albums before releasing their debut album Sonando Diferente (2002). Zion & Lennox, as a duo, released one studio album, Motivando a la Yal (2004). The album peaked at number thirty-two and number thirteen on the Billboard Latin Albums and Billboard Latin Pop Albums, respectively. The special edition re-release proved more successful, reaching number ten on the Billboard Latin Albums chart. The album was well received by critics, with Evan Gutierrez of AllMusic calling it a "landmark album" and "one of the albums that artists will refer to in years to come as one of the records that shaped reggaeton and its future".

Nicky Jam became known by appearing on various mixtapes from the 1990s. His popularity then proved itself when we released his second studio album Vida Escante (2004) which reached a mainstream audience. Ivy Queen had established herself as the top female artist in reggaetón. In 2003, Ivy Queen released Diva, her third studio album. It was considered to have been important for exposing reggaetón to a mainstream audience in 2004. After the success of the album—which was certified platinum by the RIAA, Ivy Queen released a platinum edition of Diva in 2004. The platinum edition was nominated for "Reggaeton Album of the Year" at the 2005 Billboard Latin Music Awards. It was followed by her fourth studio album, Real (2004), which was too a success.

== Chart performance ==
Upon release, the album debuted at number eight on the Billboard Top Latin Albums chart for the week of March 12, 2005, becoming that week's "Hot Shot Debut". On the Billboard Tropical Albums chart, it debuted at number three behind Daddy Yankee's Barrio Fino (2004) and Chosen Few: El Documental (2005) presented by Pina Records, for the week of March 12, 2005. It debuted at number two on the Billboard Reggae Albums chart, behind Chosen Few: El Documental for the week of March 12, 2005. Los Cazadores also managed to debut at number fourteen on the Billboard Compilation Albums chart for the week of March 12, 2005.

The album's lead single, "La Cazadora", was released to radio stations in February 2005. On the Billboard Latin Songs chart, it peaked at number 38 for the week of January 21, 2006. It peaked at number 16 on the Billboard Latin Rhythm Songs chart, for the week of November 26, 2005. On the Billboard Tropical Songs chart, the song peaked at number eight, for the week of December 17, 2005.

== Reception ==
Professional ratings
Review scores
Source	Rating
AllMusic	3.5/5 stars

An editor for AllMusic gave the album three and a half stars out of five and selected Tito "El Bambino"'s "La Cazadora", Tego Calderón and Voltio's "De Norte A Sur", Ivy Queen's "Dale Pai" and DJ Majestic's remix of "De Norte A Sur" as album highlights.

According to an editor from Metropolis, Japan's number one English-language magazine, the album "launches in full bore with the blazing beats of Tito El Bambino’s "La Cazadora" and doesn't let up through 19 tracks of rumbustious beats, macho boasts and lyrical leers."

The Megaton Awards are presented annually by the SBS Reggaetón Network, composed of the American radio stations "Reggaeton 94.FM", "mega 97.9FM", "El Sol 95.7FM", and "Latino 96.3FM" in the United States. At the 2005 installment of the awards ceremony, the album was nominated for “Reggaetón Compilation Album of the Year”.

== Track listing ==
No.	Title	Music	Artist	Length
1.	"Intro"	DJ Majestic	Los Cazadores	1:30
2.	"La Cazadora"	Rafi Mercenario	Tito "El Bambino"	3:08
3.	"De Norte A Sur" (featuring Julio Voltio)	Rafi Mercenario	Tego Calderón	4:19
4.	"Fuego"	Rafi Mercenario, Sosa	Yaga & Mackie	3:13
5.	"Me Dejaste Solo"	Rafi Mercenario, Sosa	Jomar	2:25
6.	"Y Vas Caminando"	Rafi Mercenario, Sosa	Zion & Lennox	4:29
7.	"Voy A Buscarte"	Rafi Mercenario	Nicky Jam	2:27
8.	"Dale Pai"	DJ Adam	Ivy Queen	2:56
9.	"Dale Bien Duro Nena"	Rafi Mercenario, Monserrate	Pedro Prez	3:17
10.	"Vine Pa' Quedarme"	DJ Jan	Gammy	2:35
11.	"Uhh, Ahh"	DJ Blass	Rey Pirin	3:22
12.	"Te Voy A Dar Candela"	Rafi Mercenario, DJ Sonic	Guanabanas	3:08
13.	"Llegaron Los Killers"	Rafi Mercenario, Monserrate	Negritos de Bata	2:52
14.	"Bailalo"	DJ Blass, Rafi Mercenario	Andy Boy	4:04
15.	"Hay Amor"	DJ Blass, Rafi Mercenario	Notch	3:08
16.	"Me Tiene Hipnotizao"	DJ Blass	Maicol & Manuel	4:26
17.	"La Gallina" (featuring El Capu)	DJ Jan	Dominic	4:32
18.	"De Norte A Sur" (Remix featuring Voltio)	DJ Majestic	Tego Calderón	3:46
19.	"La Cazadora" (Remix)	DJ Majestic, Mr. G	Tito "El Bambino"	3:31
Total length:				63:08

== Credits and personnel ==
Adapted from the album's liner notes.

- Andy Boy – Featured Artist
- Tego Calderón – Featured Artist
- Holly Chen – Creative Design
- DJ Adam – Musical Production
- DJ Blass – Musical Production
- DJ Majestic – Editing, Mixing, Musical Production
- DJ Sonic – Musical Production
- Dominic – Featured Artist
- Gran Omar – Executive Production: “Dale Pai”
- Guanabanas – Featured Artist
- Ivy Queen – Featured Artist, Executive Production: “Dale Pai”
- Nicky Jam – Featured Artist
- Jomar – Featured Artist
- Maicol & Manuel – Featured Artists
- Mr. G – Musical Production
- Notch – Featured Artist
- Pedro Prez – Featured Artist
- Platinum Entertainment – Record Label
- Esteban Piñero – Mastering
- Rafi Mercenario – Musical Production
- Sony Discos – Manufacture, Distribution
- Sosa – Musical Production
- Tito “El Bambino” – Featured Artist
- Yaga & Mackie – Featured Artists
- Zion & Lennox – Featured Artists

== Charts ==
Chart (2005)	Peak position
US Compilation Albums (Billboard)	14
US Latin Albums (Billboard)	8
US Tropical Albums (Billboard)	3
US Reggae Albums (Billboard)	2

== Release history ==
Region	Date	Format	Label
Canada	February 22, 2005	Import	Sony Music Latin
Germany	September 12, 2007	Import	Sony Music Latin
Italy	July 20, 2005	Import	Sony Music Latin
Japan	June 24, 2005	Import	Sony Music Latin
Spain	July 20, 2005	Import	Sony Music Latin
United Kingdom	July 20, 2005	CD	Sony Music Latin
United States	February 22, 2005	CD, Digital download	Sony Music Latin
