= Loco (Justin Quiles, Chimbala and Zion & Lennox song) =

2021 single by Justin Quiles, Chimbala and Zion & Lennox

Single by Justin Quiles, Chimbala and Zion & Lennox

from the album La Última Promesa
- Language: Spanish
- Released: May 13, 2021
- Genre: Soca; afrobeats
- Length: 3:51
- Label: Warner Music Latina
- Songwriters: Bryan Peguero Reyes; Félix Ortiz Torres; Gabriel Pizarro; Justin Quiles; Leury Jose Tejeda Brito; Santiago Alexander De Jesus Montero
- Producers: Bryan Peguero Reyes; Max Borghetti; Santiago Alexander De Jesus Montero

Justin Quiles singles chronology
"Todos Perreando" (2021)	"Loco" (2021)	"La Botella" (2021)

Zion & Lennox singles chronology
"Bésame" (2020)	"Loco" (2021)

Music video
- "Loco" on YouTube

"Loco" ("crazy") is a song by American singer Justin Quiles, Dominican rapper Chimbala and Puerto Rican duo Zion & Lennox. It was released on May 13, 2021, via Warner Music Latina. The song was from Quiles's third studio album La Última Promesa.

== Critical reception ==
Staffs of Billboard commented that the track "giv[es] life to those Caribbean flares", writing that it makes "it a refreshing, tropical song that can easily become a summer anthem".

== Music video ==
The music video was directed and produced by Rodrigo Films. The video was filmed in the Dominican Republic.

== Charts ==
=== Weekly charts ===
Weekly chart performance for "Loco"
Chart (2021)	Peak position
Global 200 (Billboard)	93
Italy (FIMI)	30
Portugal (AFP)	88
Spain (Promusicae)	4
US Hot Latin Songs (Billboard)	13
US Latin Airplay (Billboard)	1
US Latin Rhythm Airplay (Billboard)	1

=== Year-end charts ===
Year-end chart performance for "Loco"
Chart (2021)	Position
Spain (PROMUSICAE)	7
US Hot Latin Songs (Billboard)	49

== Certifications ==
Region	Certification	Certified units/sales
Italy (FIMI)	Gold	35,000^{‡}
Spain (Promusicae)	7× Platinum	420,000^{‡}
^{‡} Sales+streaming figures based on certification alone.

== Release history ==
Release history for "Loco"
Region	Date	Format	Label	Ref.
Various	May 13, 2021	Digital download; streaming	Warner Music Latina	

== See also ==
- List of Billboard number-one Latin songs of 2021
