= Myztiko =

Canadian music producer

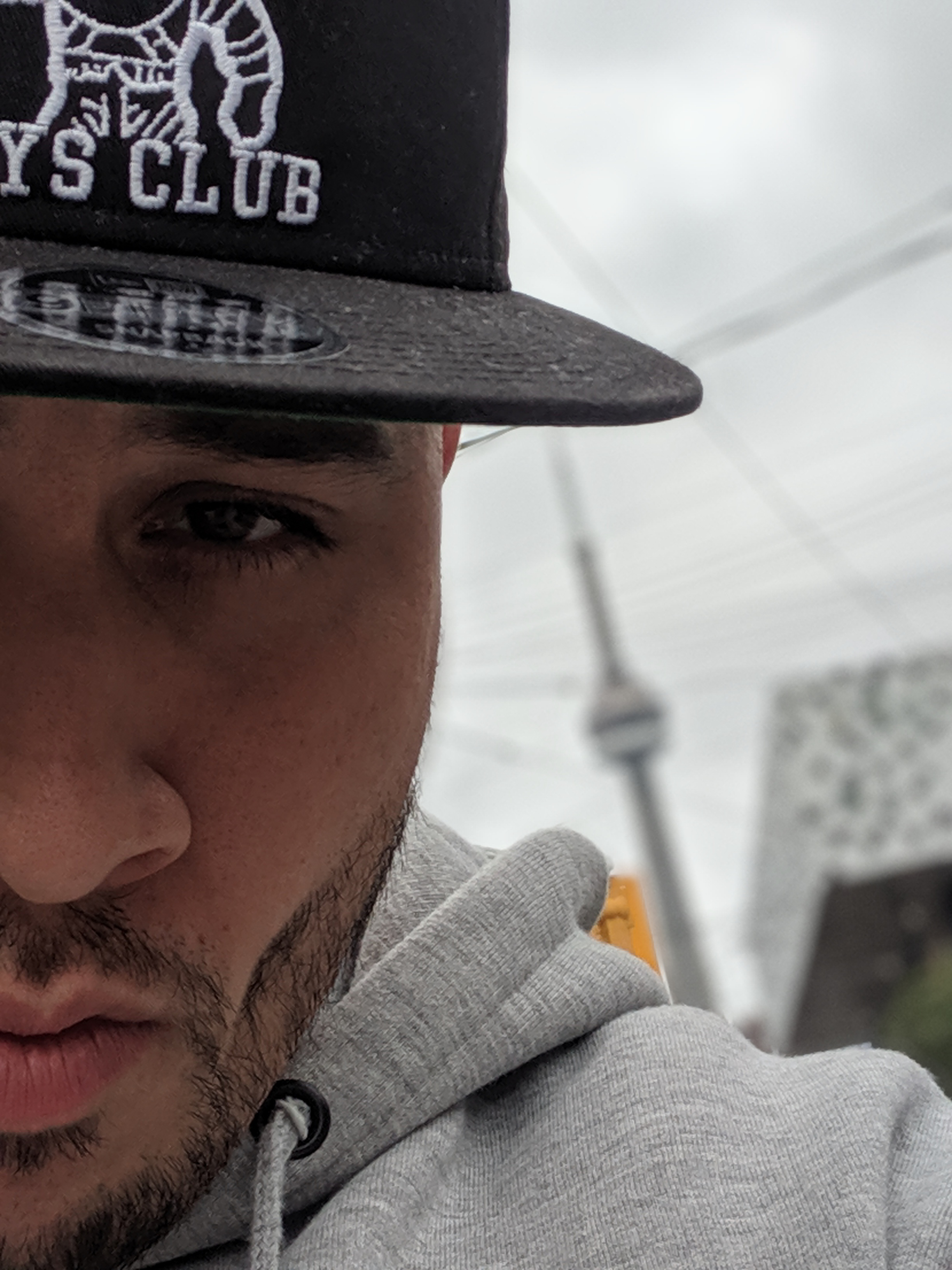

Background information
- Also known as: Myztiko, El De Las Melodias Locas, Crazy Melody, C. Melody
- Genres: Reggaeton, R&B, Tropical Pop
- Occupations: Musician, producer
- Years active: 1999–present
- Labels: Pina Records, Crazy Melody Music
- Website: www.instagram.com/myztiko/?hl=en

Myztiko "El de las Melodías Locas", is a Canadian music producer. His journey into the world of music began when he was discovered by Raphy Pina of Pina Records, Myztiko quickly rose to prominence and became a pivotal part of Pina's 'Nuevo Dream Team.'

One of his career-defining moments was working on R.K.M & Ken-Y's album 'Masterpiece' with the Mambo Kingz and Los Magnificos. This project marked a significant milestone in his career.

In 2023, Myztiko gained further recognition for producing the hit song 'Menthol,' a collaboration with Gio Bulla and Los Audio Kimikos. This track captivated audiences worldwide and solidified his reputation as a trailblazing producer.

Myztiko's musical journey has been punctuated by collaborations with some of the biggest names in the reggaeton industry. He worked with artists like Plan B, Chencho Corleone, Natti Natasha, J Balvin, Nicky Jam, Jacob Forever, Arcangel, Daddy Yankee, De La Ghetto, Farina, R.K.M & Ken-Y, Cruzito, Tony Dize, Jowell y Randy, and even the legendary Nelly Furtado.

== Chart performance ==
=== Singles ===
Title	Year	Peak							Album
Title	Year	US Billboard Hot Latin	US Billboard Latin Airplay	US Billboard Latin Digital	US Billboard Latin Pop Airplay	US Billboard Latin Rhythm Airplay	US Billboard Tropical Airplay	MX Billboard Pop Airplay	Album
Dime Que Sera R.K.M. & Ken-Y ft. Cruzito	2006	-	-	-	-	18	-	-	Masterpiece
Me Matas R.K.M. & Ken-Y	2007	9	9	-	-	2	-	-	Masterpiece
Oh Oh, ¿Porque Te Están Velando? R.K.M. & Ken-Y	2007	-	-	-	-	30	-	-	Masterpiece
One in a Million R.K.M. & Ken-Y ft. Cruzito	2010	-	-	-	-	22	-	-	Masterpiece
Si no le contesto Plan B	2010	37	37	8	26	17	6	33	House of Pleasure
Es un secreto Plan B	2010	-	-	38	-	23	16	-	House of Pleasure
Mi amor es pobre Tony Dize, R.K.M. & Ken-Y, Arcángel	2010	24	24	-	17	14	15	-	La Melodía de la Calle
Yo Quiero Un Pueblo Que Cante R.K.M. & Ken-Y, Tony Dize, Plan B & Cruzito	2010	-	-	-	-	21	-	-	Prescripcion para Pensar
Hasta Abajo Don Omar	2010	9	9	6	-	1	2	-	Meet the Orphans
Como curar Zion y Lennox	2010	30	30	50	27	3	4	-	Los Verdaderos
Momentos Zion y Lennox	2010	-	-	-	-	19	-	-	Los Verdaderos
Mas R.K.M. & Ken-Y	2011	-	-	-	36	12	37	-	Forever

== Productions ==
=== Instrumental albums ===
- 2020: Untitled Beat Tape, Vol. 1
- 2023: LOFI Radio 1

=== Various Artists ===
- 2003: Laboratorio Musikal
- 2018: Dédicace
- 2019: Música de Fondo
- 2020: Los Phenomenons
- 2023: Los Archivos

== Singles ==
2001: Aqui Se Separan (Daddy Yankee)
2004: Reggaeton Ripiao (Grupo Aguakate ft. Don Chezina)
2004: Miralo y aceptalo (Funky, Ivan y AB)
2005: Stand Strong (Papa San)
2006: Dime Que Sera (R.K.M. & Ken-Y ft. Cruzito)
2006: La Revolucion Del Reggaeton (Dj Memo)
2006: De Que Vale (Gargolas ft. Cruzito)
2006: Si la Ves (R.K.M. & Ken-Y ft. Cruzito)
2007: Me Matas (R.K.M. & Ken-Y)
2007: Me Matas Remix (R.K.M. & Ken-Y ft. Daddy Yankee)
2007: Sueltate (R.K.M. & Ken-Y ft. Cruzito)
2007: Quedate con el (Nicky Jam)
2007: Oh Oh, ¿Porque Te Están Velando? (R.K.M. & Ken-Y)
2007: Suspenso (Jancy, Lennox)
2008: Amor Escondido (Randy ft. Cruzito
2008: Bounce (Lito, Cruzito)
2008: Para Mi (Erre XI – Errevolution XI)
2009: Mas Remix (Nelly Furtado, Tony Dize)
2009: One in a Million (Tony Dize)
2009: One in a Million remix (Tony Dize ft. R.K.M. & Ken-Y, Cruzito)
2009: Durmiendo Relajada (Erre XI – Errevolution XI)
2009: Traicionera Remix (Diamond Flow, Américo)
2010: Si No Le Contesto (Plan B)
2010: Hasta Abajo Don Omar
2010: Que me paso (Plan B)
2010: Es un Secreto (Plan B)
2010: Mi Amor es Pobre (Tony Dize, R.K.M. & Ken-Y, Arcángel)
2010: Para Mi (Gerry Capo ft. Grupo Nota)
2010: Yo Quiero Un Pueblo Que Cante (R.K.M. & Ken-Y, Tony Dize, Plan B & Cruzito)
2010: Por amor a ti (Ken-Y)
2020: Mi Delirio remix (Anahí, Ken-Y)
2010: Como curar (Zion y Lennox)
2010: Momentos (Zion y Lennox)
2010: De una vez (Zion y Lennox)
2010: Soltera (Zion y Lennox, Alberto Stylee, J Balvin)
2010: Arriesgando mi inocencia (Zion y Lennox)
2010: Solos (Tony Dize – La Melodia Updated, Plan B, Don Omar)
2011: Vagabundo (Cruzito)
2011: Prefiero Morir (R.K.M. & Ken-Y)
2011: Goodbye (R.K.M. & Ken-Y)
2011: Te Doy una Rosa (R.K.M. & Ken-Y)
2011: Mas (R.K.M. & Ken-Y)
2011: Te Amor (R.K.M. & Ken-Y)
2011: De Rodillas (R.K.M. & Ken-Y)
2011: Prefiero morir remix (R.K.M. & Ken-Y)
2011: Forever (R.K.M. & Ken-Y)
2011: Desperate for your love (Ken-Y)
2011: La Crema reggaeton version (Big Metra)
2012: Habla Claro (Arcángel, Noztra)
2012: Pongan atencion (Farina)
2012: Descaradamente Bella (Farina)
2012: Soñar no cuesta nada (Farina)
2012: Money, money (Farina)
2013: Camaleón (Los Rakas ft. Frank Nino)
2014: Ménage à trois (J. Quiles)
2015: Al Limite de la Locura (Tony Dize – La Melodia Updated)
2015: De Que Vale pt. 2 (Cruzito)
2016: Amor de Locos (R.K.M. & Ken-Y, Natti Natasha)
2016: Te invito a volar (R.K.M. & Ken-Y)
2018: Amor Escondido (Cruzito)
2020: Wavy (Cruzito, Skilteck)
