= The Way She Moves =

Single by Zion featuring Akon

from the album The Perfect Melody
- Released: April 21, 2007
- Recorded: 2007
- Genre: Pop; R&B
- Length: 3:54
- Label: Motown; Baby
- Songwriters: Aliaune Thiam; Felix Ortiz
- Producer: Akon

Zion singles chronology
"Veo" (2007)	"The Way She Moves" (2007)	"Zun Da Da" (2007)

Akon singles chronology
"We Takin' Over" (2007)	"The Way She Moves" (2007)	"Mama Africa" (2007)

"The Way She Moves" is a song written and performed by Puerto Rican singer Zion and American singer Akon. Produced by Akon, the song was released as the lead single from Zion's debut solo studio album The Perfect Melody (2007). After temporarily separating from the duo Zion & Lennox, Zion began recording material for his debut solo album. The song was released to radio stations on April 21, 2007 and released as a digital download on April 9, 2008.

== Background and composition ==
Zion "The Way She Moves" (2008)
A 24-second sample of the lead single from the album, "The Way She Moves", where Zion mentions that his lover is "like Shakira belly dancing at the Grammy Awards, like Beyoncé clapping her booty at the MTV show".

Zion became known in the duo Zion & Lennox. As a duo, they released one studio album, Motivando a la Yal (2004). The album peaked at number thirty-two and number thirteen on the Billboard Latin Albums and Billboard Latin Pop Albums, respectively. The special edition re-release performed better, reaching number ten on the Billboard Latin Albums chart. The album was well received by critics, with Evan Gutierrez of Allmusic calling it a "landmark album" and "one of the albums that artists will refer to in years to come as one of the records that shaped reggaeton and its future". In 2006, the duo separated, allowing Zion to focus on his solo career. He began working on The Perfect Melody in October 2007. Originally, the album was to be a compilation album of various artist, though after "bad experiences with new talent", Zion decided to work the project alone. According to an editor for Allmusic, the song is a "beat—driven" pop song and "a smooth, catchy collaboration with Akon".

== Release and chart performance ==
"The Way She Moves" was released as the lead single from the album to radio stations on April 21, 2007. It was released as digital download on April 9, 2008, along with the second single "Zun Da Da". The music video, which features Akon was released for purchase on June 28, 2007. It was posted to the video-sharing website YouTube on November 22, 2009 and has generated over twelve million views. On Billboard Latin Songs chart, the song debuted at number forty-six for the week of May 5, 2007 and peaked at number eleven the week of June 16, 2007. On the Billboard Tropical Songs chart, the song debuted at number thirty-three the issue dated May 12, 2007 and peaked at number thirteen the week of June 16, 2007. On the Billboard Latin Rhythm Songs chart, the song debuted at number twenty-four for the week of April 28, 2007 and peaked at number three on the week of June 16, 2007. On the Billboard Latin Pop Songs chart, "The Way She Moves" debuted and peaked at number thirty-four for the week of August 11, 2007 and spent an additional six weeks on the chart before exiting it at number thirty-five for the week of September 15, 2007. The song also managed one week at number twenty-one on the Billboard Bubbling Under Hot 100 chart for the week dated June 2, 2007.

== Charts ==
=== Weekly charts ===
Chart (2007)	Peak position
US Bubbling Under Hot 100 (Billboard)	21
US Hot Latin Songs (Billboard)	11
US Tropical Songs (Billboard)	13
US Latin Rhythm Songs (Billboard)	3
US Latin Pop Songs (Billboard)	34

=== Yearly charts ===
Chart (2007)	Position
US Latin Rhythm Songs (Billboard)	18
