= Los Verdaderos =

Studio album by Zion & Lennox
- Released: November 2, 2010
- Recorded: 2010
- Genre: Reggaeton
- Length: 66:48
- Label: Pina; Sony Latin
- Producer: Eliel, Myztiko, Profesor Gómez, Tainy, Predikador, Los de la Nazza, Duran

Zion & Lennox chronology
The Perfect Melody (2007)	Los Verdaderos (2010)	La Formula (2012)

Singles from Los Verdaderos
- 1. "¿Cómo Curar?" Released: August 16, 2010; 2. "Hoy Lo Siento" Released: October 27, 2010; 3. "Perdido Por El Mundo" Released: February 1, 2011

Los Verdaderos is the second studio album, and third overall from, Puerto Rican reggaeton duo Zion & Lennox. It was released on November 2, 2010 by Pina Records and Sony Music Latin. Only 2 weeks of release date, the album manages to position itself as the #2 in the Urban Latin charts and #10 on Billboard best seller in both Latin America and in the United States. The album features collaborations with Daddy Yankee, Jowell & Randy, Tony Dize, J Balvin and Alberto Stylee. The album became a success in United States and Latin America, placing their singles #1 on both the United States and Latin America's Charts.

== Track listing ==
No.	Title	Writer(s)	Producer(s)	Length
1.	"Yo Soy Tu DJ"	Félix Ortíz; Gabriel Pizarro; Rafael Pina; Giann Arias	Live Music	4:09
2.	"La Lluvia"	F. Ortíz; G. Pizarro; R. Pina; Víctor Delgado	Predikador	3:12
3.	"Momentos"	F. Ortíz; G. Pizarro; R. Pina; Eliel Lind; Joan Ortíz	Eliel; Myztiko	4:24
4.	"Como Curar"	F. Ortíz; G. Pizarro; R. Pina; E. Lind; Joel Báez	Eliel; Myztiko	4:21
5.	"Arriesgando Mi Inocencia"	F. Ortíz; G. Pizarro; R. Pina; E. Lind; Luis O'Neill	Eliel; Myztiko	4:45
6.	"La Cita" (featuring Jowell y Randy)	F. Ortíz; G. Pizarro; Joel Muñóz; Randy Ortíz; G. Arias	Live Music	4:15
7.	"Detective de Tu Amor"	R. Pina; E. Lind; J. Báez; Jesús Nieves	Eliel; Duran	3:29
8.	"Perdido por el Mundo" (featuring Daddy Yankee)	F. Ortíz; G. Pizarro; Ramón Ayala; R. Pina	Los de la Nazza	3:15
9.	"Si Fuera por Mi"	F. Ortíz; G. Pizarro; R. Pina; L. O'Neill; José Gómez; Chris Jeday	O'Neill; Professor Gomez; Chris Jeday	4:58
10.	"Me Desvelo"	F. Ortíz; G. Pizarro; R. Pina; E. Lind	Eliel	3:17
11.	"Hoy Lo Siento" (featuring Tony Dize)	Gabriel Cruz	Eliel; Duran; Myztiko	3:46
12.	"Ella Me Conviene"	F. Ortíz; G. Pizarro; R. Ayala	Los de la Nazza	3:43
13.	"Soltera" (featuring J Balvin and Alberto Stylee)	F. Ortíz; G. Pizarro; José Osorio; Carlos Pizarro	DJ Precise; Pope	4:42
14.	"De una Vez"	F. Ortíz; G. Pizarro; R. Pina; Karl Palencia	Myztiko	5:17
15.	"Love You Now"	F. Ortíz; G. Pizarro; R. Pina	Los Metálicoz	5:11
16.	"Amor Genuino"	F. Ortíz; G. Pizarro; R. Pina; E. Lind	Eliel	4:04
Total length:				66:48

== Credits and personnel ==
Some credits adapted from AllMusic.

- Félix Ortíz: Primary Artist – Vocals – Writer – Executive Producer
- Gabriel Pizarro: Primary Artist – Vocals – Writer – Executive Producer
- Rafael Pina: Writer – Executive Producer – Mixing
- Eliel Lind: Writer – Composer – Producer – Electronic Keyboard – Guitar – Bass
- Karl Palencia: Writer – Mixing – Producer
- Giann Arias: Writer – Composer – Producer – Electronic Keyboard
- Chris Jeday: Writer – Composer – Producer – Electronic Keyboard – Guitar
- Predikador: Writer – Composer – Producer – Electronic Keyboard
- José Gómez: Writer – Producer
- Luis O'Neill: Writer – Composer – Producer
- Esteban Piñeiro: Mastering
- Joel Muñóz: Featured Artist – Vocals – Writer
- Randy Ortíz: Featured Artist – Vocals – Writer
- Ramón Ayala: Featured Artist – Vocals – Writer
- José Osorio: Featured Artist – Vocals – Writer
- Carlos Pizarro: Featured Artist – Vocals – Writer
- Antonio Rivera: Featured Artist – Vocals
- Gabriel Cruz: Writer
- Iancarlo Reyes: Creative Art – Design
- Ana Alvarado: Production Coordination
- Edwin David: Photography
- Andrés Coll: Marketing

== Charts ==
Chart (2010)	Peak position
US Top Latin Albums (Billboard)	10
US Latin Rhythm Albums (Billboard)	2
US Top Rap Albums (Billboard)	23
