= Los Cocorocos =

Compilation album by Various artists
- Released: November 21, 2006
- Genre: Salsa music, reggaeton

Los Cocorocos was a collaborative album between salsa and reggaeton singers released in 2006 by indie CMG (Coalition Music Group) distributed by Universal/MOTOWN. The album fused sounds between salsa and reggaeton.

This production has musical arrangements by Charlie Donato, Domingo Quiñones, Jose Lugo and Willie Sotello.

“Los hombres tienen la culpa” by Gilberto Santa Rosa and Don Omar was the debut single of this release and an original by producer Charlie Donato. Recorded at “Major League Music Studios”, with Corey Hill as sound engineer and mixed by Marioso.

== Tracks ==
1. Intro - Gallego 1:50
2. Los Hombres Tienen la Culpa - Don Omar & Gilberto Santa Rosa 4:45
3. Dos Jueyes - Zion & Domingo Quiñones 3:48
4. Che Che Cole - Tego Calderón & Víctor Manuelle 4:05
5. Mal Aguero - La Sister & Domingo Quiñones 3:38
6. Perdona Viejo - Papo Rosario & Aniel Rosario 4:17
7. Los Gorditos - Tito Nieves, John Eric, and Pedro Bull 4:47
8. Ayi Viene Mista - Mista 3:55
9. Mulata Rumbera - Junior Gonzalez & Plaza 4:16
10. Esa Nena - J-king y Maximan 3:07
11. Mafo Crew - Mafo Crew 3:25
12. La Wasa - Symphonia 4:01
13. Claro de Luna - Julio Voltio 3:14

== Chart position ==
Album

Year	Chart	Album	Peak
2006	Billboard Latin Tropical Album	Los Cocorocos	1
2006	Billboard Top Latin Albums	Los Cocorocos	13

Singles

Year	Chart	Single	Peak
2006	Billboard Latin Tropical Airplay	Dos Jueyes	38
2006	Billboard Hot Latin Tracks	Los Hombres Tienen La Culpa	39
2006	Billboard Latin Tropical Airplay	Los Hombres Tienen La Culpa	1

== See also ==
- List of number-one Billboard Tropical Albums from the 2000s
