= Zun Da Da =

Single by Zion

from the album The Perfect Melody
- Released: July 20, 2007
- Recorded: 2007
- Genre: Reggaeton; hip hop
- Length: 5:04
- Label: Motown; Baby
- Songwriter: Gabriel Cruz
- Producer: DJ Memo

Zion singles chronology
"The Way She Moves" (2007)	"Zun Da Da" (2007)	"Fantasma" (2007)

"Zun Da Da" is a song by Puerto Rican singer Zion. It was selected as the second single from his debut solo studio album The Perfect Melody (2007). The song was released to radio stations on July 20, 2007, and released as a digital download on April 9, 2008. In 2022, Rolling Stone listed the song at number 99 on its list of the 100 Greatest Reggaeton Songs of All Time.

== Charts ==
Chart (2007)	Peak position
US Hot Latin Songs (Billboard)	12
US Tropical Songs (Billboard)	11
US Latin Rhythm Songs (Billboard)	5
