= Chimbala =

Dominican rapper

- Born: Leury José Tejeda Brito; May 18, 1989 (age 37); Santo Domingo, Dominican Republic
- Genres: Hip-hop; Urban music
- Occupations: Rapper; singer
- Instrument: Vocals
- Label: La Para Records

Leury José Tejeda Brito, musically known as Chimbala, is a Dominican urban music rapper and singer from Santo Domingo.

He has been dubbed one of the primary performers of dembow in Latin America. He has collaborated with artists such as El Alfa, Mozart La Para, José Reyes, Don Miguelo, Black Point and La Materalista. He gained fame with the song "Maniquí" calling Farruko's attention and doing a remix.

== Career ==
Chimbala's musical history begins in his neighborhood, where he made songs for an album that came out but was not very popular. With a more established work machinery, Chimbala put the final touches on his album "Chimbala de este lado".

In 2012, Chimbala released the songs "Tu eres un loco" and "Cuenta Conmigo" (with the collaborations of Pablo Piddy and Toxic Crow), among others. In 2014, he released the song "Tu no corre a na", in response to a song that attacked him from El Alfa.

Chimbala resumed his work in urban music at the end of 2016 with the song "Tamo burlao", a collaboration with his colleague El Fother. Since its launch on October 11, 2016, this song has achieved almost seven million views in just two months on its official YouTube video. At this time, he is called by some urban media outlets "The little giant! of urban music. In the words of Chimabal himself, 2016 was a year of a lot of work because he managed to hit several songs, made a video clip, toured several countries, remained popular with the public, and conquered other markets.

In January 2017,Chimbala had the singles "To lo gogo" and "Desacatao" playing on the main radio stations in the Dominican Republic, both singles with thousands of visits on the YouTube platform.

At the end of 2017 he released the official video for the song "Bye Bye", which brought him quite a bit of fame, this song was in collaboration with Mozart La Para and Liro Shaq.

On February 2, 2018, he released the official video for "Pocoto" on the YouTube platform. Ten months after its release, it already had more than three million views.

"Maniquí" is the single that has given Chimbala a large musical boost to his career. It premiered on May 18, 2018, on his YouTube channel. A couple of months after its premiere, the video already had more than 18 million views. It was produced by the Crea Fama Inc. label.

Another success of Chimbala is the song "Ta Celosos", which has more than five million views on YouTube.

These songs have given Chimbala the formula to become one of the most popular urban songs in 2018, so its national and international acceptance is felt in the music. During this period he commented: "This hit of mine is due to the new fusions and rhythms that I have used in my latest musical productions and that are bearing fruit today," he added. By mid-2018, the company Princesa Films was shooting a film that lowed chimbala to reach the big screen called "Calle cul-de-sac".

In mid-2018, the artist Mark B presented the single “Pónmelo a sonar”, in collaboration with Chimbala, which was playing on the radio in the Dominican Republic for several weeks. The song was made by Ramón Estix Taveras Mejía, “Nitido en El Nintendo”, under the executive production of Alofoke Music and Bombón Productions. Since its release, this collaboration has been accompanied by a music video directed by X Wayne Liriano, where dances, colors, and lights are the fundamental elements of the official video. “Pónmelo a sonar”, becomes part of the repertoire of the interpreter of Mark B, which has several famous songs such as “Pal de candles” and “Playa y arena”.

In January 2019, Chimbala released the song "Colombiana", produced by B-One under the label of La Para Record, belonging to reggaeton player Mozart La Para, that same month he released the song "El Pito Remix Internacional", and performed a series of nightclub performances during this time.

In 2022 he was part of the "Premio Lo Nuestro" stage with the album "Wow BB", along with Natti Natasha and El Alfa. That same year he also released his album "Feliz", which reached No. 1 on Monitor Latino in the Dominican Republic. In 2023, he would repeat this position with "Déjate ver".

== Awards ==
=== Heat Latin Music Awards ===
- 2021: Best Urbano Dominican Artist (nominated)
- 2022: Mejor Colaboración" by "Loco" featuring Justin Quiles and Zion & Lennox (Winners)

=== Others ===
2022 Monitor Music Awards: Best Dembow Artist (Nominated)

2025 Soberano Awards: Best Urban singer
