= Desafío (album) =

2003 compilation album by New Era Entertainment

Compilation album by various artists
- Released: February 1, 2003
- Recorded: 2002–2003
- Genre: Reggaeton
- Length: 1:13:52
- Labels: New Era Entertainment; The Lab Studios

Desafío is a compilation album released by New Era Entertainment in 2003. It consists of 25 tracks featuring such reggaeton artists as Ivy Queen, Don Omar, Alexis & Fido, Wisin & Yandel, and Tego Calderón, among others.

== Track listing ==
#	Title	Artist(s)	Producer(s)	Time
1	"Intro"			0:34
2	"Mix"	Don Omar, Tempo, Tego Calderón, Wisin & Yandel, Alexis	Luny Tunes & Noriega	3:57
3	"Quien Quiere Guerra"	Tempo & Mexicano	Echo	4:19
4	"En La Disco Bailoteo"	Wisin & Yandel	Luny Tunes & Noriega	2:49
5	"La Vida"	Tego Calderón	Maestro	2:57
6	"Miralos"	Don Omar	Barbosa & Nolo	3:30
7	"Baila Conmigo"	Zion & Lennox	Luny Tunes & Noriega	2:23
8	"El Nalgazo"	Alexis & Fido	Luny Tunes & Noriega	2:12
9	"Llegaste"	Jomar	Luny Tunes & Noriega	2:43
10	"Tu Cuerpo En La Disco"	Karel & Julio Voltio	Luny Tunes & Noriega	2:42
11	"Dime"	Ivy Queen & Gran Omar	DJ Adam	2:43
12	"Desafio"	Mexicano	DJ Adam	3:46
13	"La Vida (Reggaeton Version)"	Tego Calderón	Luny Tunes & Noriega	3:13
14	"Tu Cuerpo Quiero Tocar"	Baby Rasta & Gringo	Luny Tunes & Noriega	2:53
15	"Chicas Baila Y Gozan"	Angel & Khriz	Barbosa & DJ Chico	3:00
16	"Baila Asi"	Nicky Jam	Barbosa & Nolo	3:01
17	"Vengan"	Street Clan People	Barbosa & Omar	2:43
18	"Cae La Noche"	Falo	Luny Tunes & Noriega	2:56
19	"Te Invito Al Party"	Los Ganjas	Luny Tunes & Noriega	3:03
20	"Muevanse"	John Eric	Barbosa	3:25
21	"Estamos Janguendo"	Maestro	Maestro	2:46
22	"Acercate"	Guanabanas	Luny Tunes & Noriega	2:55
23	"Provocandote"	Sammy & El Amolao	Barbosa & Omar	2:46
24	"Street Boris"	Bishop	Echo	3:03
25	"Quien Quiere Guerra"	Tempo & Mexicano	Echo & DJ Black	3:45

== Charts ==
Chart (2003)	Peak position
US Tropical Albums (Billboard)	14
