= La Fórmula (album) =

Compilation album by various artists
- Released: August 21, 2012
- Recorded: 2010–2012
- Genre: Reggaeton; rap; Latin pop
- Length: 77:14
- Label: Pina
- Producer: Luny Tunes; Tainy; Musicologo & Menes; Haze; Rafy Mercenario; Los Evo Jedis; Jumbo; Mambo Kingz; Eliel; Predikador; Live Music

Pina Records Presenta: La Fórmula The Company (simply known as La Fórmula) is a compilation album by various artists, released under the Pina label on August 21, 2012. The album contains tracks by Zion & Lennox, Plan B, RKM & Ken-Y, Arcángel, Lobo, and Jalil Lopez, who were part of Pina's roster at the time, as well as guest appearances by Daddy Yankee, Yomo, Jory of Nova & Jory, Don Omar, De la Ghetto, and Randy of Jowell & Randy.

The album received a nomination for the Billboard Latin Music Award for Latin Rhythm Album of the Year in 2013 and 2014. It debuted at No. 1 on the Billboard Top Latin Albums chart.

== Track listing ==
Standard edition
No.	Title	Writer(s)	Singer(s)	Length
1.	"Mi Fórmula"	Rafael Pina	Rafael Pina	1:21
2.	"La Fórmula Sigue"	Austin Santos, Felix Ortiz, Gabriel Pizarro, Orlando Javier Valle Vega, Edwin Vázquez Vega, José Nieves, Kenny Vázquez	Zion, Arcangel, Lennox, R.K.M, Chencho, Maldy, Ken-Y	4:55
3.	"Gastos Largos"	Santos	Arcángel	3:32
4.	"Se Cree Mala"	Valle Vega, Vázquez Vega	Plan B	4:27
5.	"More" (featuring Jory)	Ortiz, Vázquez, Fernando Sierra	Zion & Ken-Y	4:00
6.	"Diosa De Los Corazones"	Pina, Yoel Damas, Gabriel Cruz	Ken-Y, Zion, Lobo, Lennox, Arcángel, R.K.M	4:04
7.	"Juego Mental"	Eric Joel Rodríguez	Lobo	2:57
8.	"Cuando Te Enamores"	Nieves, Vázquez	R.K.M & Ken-Y	4:00
9.	"Chupop"	Ortiz, Pizarro	Zion & Lennox	3:46
10.	"Me Prefieres A Mí (Remix)" (featuring Don Omar)	Santos, William Omar Landrón Rivera	Arcángel	4:22
11.	"Llevo Tras De Ti (Remix)" (featuring Daddy Yankee)	Valle Vega, Vázquez Vega, Santos, Ramón Luis Ayala Rodriguez	Plan B & Arcangel	3:53
12.	"Pasarla Bien"	Nieves, Jalil Lopez, Rodríguez	R.K.M, Jalil Lopez, & Lobo	3:18
13.	"Fórmula Perfecta" (featuring De la Ghetto)	Vázquez, Santos, Rafael Castillo	Ken-Y & Arcángel	3:32
14.	"Flow Violento"	Santos	Arcángel	3:02
15.	"Cantazo" (featuring Yomo)	Ortiz, Pizarro, Jose Alberto Torres Abreu	Zion & Lennox	3:49
16.	"Imagínate Remix"	Rodríguez	Lobo	2:54
17.	"Ella Me Dice"	Ortiz, Santos	Zion & Arcángel	3:46
18.	"Te Dijeron"	Eddie Ávila	Plan B	3:03
19.	"Yo Controlo" (featuring Randy)	Santos, Randy Ariel Ortíz Acevedo	Arcángel	4:24
20.	"3 Pa' 3"	Nieves, Vázquez Vega, Pizarro	R.K.M, Maldy, & Lennox	4:03
21.	"Diosa De Los Corazones (Club Version)"	Vázquez, Ortiz, Pizarro, Santos, Nieves	Ken-Y, Zion, Lobo, Lennox, Arcangel, R.K.M	4:06
Total length:				1:17:14

== Charts ==
Chart (2012)	Peak Position
US Billboard 200	115
US Compilation Albums (Billboard)	7
US Top Latin Albums (Billboard)	1
US Top Rap Albums (Billboard)	17
US Top Current Album Sales (Billboard)	96
US Latin Rhythm Albums (Billboard)	1
