= Wise (composer) =

Puerto Rican musician (born 1981)

Gabriel Antonio Cruz Padilla
- Born: 1981 (age 44–45); Bayamón, Puerto Rico
- Genres: Reggaeton, latin pop, salsa, bachata, merengue
- Occupations: Composer, singer-songwriter, record producer
- Instrument: Vocals
- Years active: 2004–present
- Labels: The Gold Pen Music llc, Gold Star Music, Pina Records

Gabriel Antonio Cruz Padilla (born 1981 in Bayamón, Puerto Rico), known professionally as Wise or Wise The Gold Pen (formerly Wise Da 'Gangsta'), is a composer, singer, and producer.

== Career ==
Wise began his career as a composer of various musical genres, including salsa, merengue, Latin pop, reggaeton, trap, and urban music.

Wise has established himself as a prominent figure in the tropical and urban music industries, earning the nickname "Hit Maker." His compositions have achieved commercial success. 11 of his songs reached number one on the Billboard charts across four categories: Hot Latin Songs, Latin Rhythm Airplay, Latin Tropical Airplay, and Latin Pop Airplay, in addition to achieving 27 top 10 positions on the Billboard charts.

Wise is the president and owner of The Gold Pen Music LLC, where he currently works with emerging talent. He is the only composer to simultaneously place five songs in the top positions on the Billboard charts. His notable hits include "Hoy lo siento," performed by Zion and Lennox featuring Tony Dize, which became one of the most-played songs on national radio, and "Diosa De Los Corazones," performed by RKM & Ken-Y, Arcángel, and Zion & Lennox.

== Song credits ==
Year	Song	Performer(s)	Album	Notes
2004	"Ella Vive Sola"	Lito & Polaco featuring Gustavo Laureano	Fuera De Serie	Chorus only
2004	"Baby, Olvídame"	Monchy & Alexandra	Hasta El Fin	
2005	"Mayor Que Yo"	Baby Ranks, Tonny Tun Tun, Wisin & Yandel and Daddy Yankee	Más Flow 2	Ranked No. 1 on the U.S. Billboard Latin Tropical Airplay chart Co-written with Francisco Saldaña, Victor Cabrera, David Acosta, Juan Morera, Llandel Veguilla and Ramón Ayala
2006	"Down"	Rakim & Ken-Y	Masterpiece	Ranked No. 1 on the U.S. Billboard Latin Rhythm Airplay chart 1 nomination for Premio Lo Nuestro for Urban Song of the Year; 2 nominations for Latin Billboards Music Awards for Hot Latin Song and Reggaeton Song of the Year
2006	"Rumor De Guerra"	Hector El Father	The Bad Boy	
2006	"Sola"	Hector El Father	The Bad Boy	
2006	"Fría"	Hector El Father	The Bad Boy	
2006	"Vamos Allá"	Hector El Father	The Bad Boy	
2006	"Te Encontré"	Hector El Father	The Bad Boy	
2006	"Hello"	Zion	Mas Flow: Los Benjamins	
2006	"Lento"	RBD	Mas Flow: Los Benjamins	
2006	"Noche De Entierro"	Tonny Tun Tun, Wisin & Yandel, Héctor El Father, Zion and Daddy Yankee	Mas Flow: Los Benjamins	Ranked No. 3 on the U.S. Billboard Latin Rhythm Airplay chart
2007	"Zun Da Da"	Zion	The Perfect Melody	Ranked No. 5 on the U.S. Billboard Latin Rhythm Airplay chart
2007	"Te Vas"	Zion	The Perfect Melody	
2007	"Pa' La Tumba"	Hector El Father	The Bad Boy: The Most Wanted Edition	
2008	"María Lola"	Grupo Manía	15 Años De Corazón	Ranked No. 50 on the U.S. Billboard Latin Rhythm Airplay chart
2008	"Te Regalo Amores"	Rakim & Ken-Y	The Royalty: La Realeza	Ranked No. 1 on the U.S. Billboard Latin Rhythm Airplay chart Awarded as Urban Song of the Year at the ASCAP Latin awards
2008	"Te Amaré"	Rakim & Ken-Y featuring Jayko	The Royalty: La Realeza	
2008	"He Venido"	MJ	Mi Sentimiento	
2008	"Se Nos Cae La Casa"	Hector El Father	Juicio Final	Co-written with Armando Rosario
2008	"Te Vi Llorar"	Hector El Father	Juicio Final	
2008	"Si Me Tocaras"	Hector El Father featuring Harry Maldonado	Juicio Final	Co-written with Arthur Hanlon
2008	"Amor Primero"	Toby Love	Love Is Back	
2008	"Llorar Lloviendo"	Toby Love	Love Is Back	
2009	"El Doctorado"	Tony Dize	La Melodía De La Calle (Updated Edition)	Ranked No. 1 on the U.S. Billboard Tropical Songs chart
2009	"Mi Amor Es Pobre"	Tony Dize featuring Ken-Y	La Melodía De La Calle (Updated Edition)	Ranked No. 17 on the U.S. Billboard Latin Pop Songs chart
2009	"Enamorarme Quiero"	Mennores	Mennores	
2009	"Te Amé En Mis Sueños"	Rakim & Ken-Y	non-album single	Ranked No. 35 on the U.S. Billboard Latin Pop Songs chart
2009	"Carita Linda"	Grupo Manía featuring Olga Tañón	non-album single	Ranked No. 35 on the U.S. Billboard Latin Pop Songs chart
2009	"Boom Boom"	Zion & Lennox	Pasado, Presente Y Futuro	
2010	"Por Esa Mujer"	Chayanne	No Hay Imposibles	Co-written with Ramón Casillas
2010	"15 Inviernos"	Elvis Crespo	Indestructible	Ranked No. 26 on the U.S. Billboard Latin Pop Songs chart
2010	"Hoy Lo Siento"	Zion & Lennox featuring Tony Dize	Los Verdaderos	Ranked No. 1 on the U.S. Billboard Tropical Songs chart
2011	"Arco Iris De Colores"	Olga Tañón	Ni Una Lágrima Más	
2011	"Casi Casi"	Toby Love	La Voz De La Juventud	
2011	"Poquito A Poco"	Henry Santos	Introducing	
2011	"Por Amor"	Henry Santos	Introducing	
2011	"La Mala"	Fanny Lu	Felicidad y Perpetua	Co-written with Fanny Martínez and Andrés Munera
2011	"Ni Loca"	Fanny Lu featuring Dálmata	Felicidad y Perpetua	Co-written with Fanny Martínez and Andrés Munera; Ranked No. 1 on the Venezuelan Record Report Top 100 chart
2012	"Duele Sin Ti"	Victor Manuelle	Busco Un Pueblo	
2012	"Princesa Mía"	Jalil López	non-album single	
2012	"Todo Lo Que Sube Baja"	Olga Tañón	Una Mujer	
2012	"Tu Primer Amor"	Jalil López	non-album single	
2013	"No Soy De Piedra"	Victor Manuelle	Me Llamaré Tuyo	
2013	"Lentamente"	Arcángel	Sentimiento, Elegancia & Maldad	
2013	"Prometo Olvidarte"	Tony Dize	La Melodía De Ustedes	Ranked No. 6 on the U.S. Billboard Tropical Songs chart
2014	"Olé Brazil"	Elvis Crespo featuring Maluma	non-album single	Ranked No. 1 on the U.S. Billboard Tropical Songs chart
2014	"Pierdo La Cabeza"	Zion & Lennox	Motivan2	Ranked No. 1 on the U.S. Billboard Tropical Songs chart Nominated for a Tu Mundo Award for Song Begins-Celebrations
2014	"Ruleta Rusa"	Tony Dize	La Melodía De Ustedes	
2015	"Baby Boo"	Cosculluela	14F	
2015	"Bye Bye"	Farruko	14F	
2015	"Me Dejo Llevar"	Arcángel	14F	
2015	"En La Nada"	Zion & Lennox	14F	
2015	"Necesito De Ti"	De La Ghetto	14F	
2015	"Periódico De Ayer"	Ñengo Flow featuring Jory	14F	
2015	"Mi Lugar"	Maluma featuring Ken-Y	14F	
2015	"Ay Ay Ay"	Baby Rasta & Gringo	14F	
2015	"Él No Estará A Mi Nivel"	J Álvarez	14F	
2015	"Envejecer Conmigo"	Randy	14F	
2015	"No Lo Deseas Na"	Pusho	14F	
2015	"Decisiones"	Luigi 21 Plus featuring Arcángel	14F	
2015	"No Reciclo Amores"	Yomo	14F	
2015	"Déjate Llevar"	Gotay	14F	
2015	"Si Te Vas"	Genio	14F	
2015	"Por Tí"	Jeloz	non-album single	Ranked No. 1 on the Spotify Chile
2016	"Me Voy"	Zion & Lennox	Motivan 2	
2016	"Bailando Tu Y Yo"	Zion & Lennox	Motivan 2	
2016	"Se Puso Feo"	Zion & Lennox	Motivan 2	
2016	"Dejo De Ser Mia"	Nikki Mackliff	Non – Album Single	
2016	"Me Dijeron"	Darkiel		
2016	"Desde Ahora"	Alexa Y Wise The Gold Pen		
2016	"Me Llamas"	Piso 21		
2017	"Desperte Sin Ti"	Noriel		
2017	"Bailando tu y yo"	Zion y Lennox		
2018	"Quien Sabe"	Natti Natasha		
2019	"Te Veo"	Zion y Lennox featuring Lyanno		
2019	"Agua"	Luis Raul Marrero		
2019	"Soy tu Dios"	Luis Raul Marrero		
2019	"Disfrazao"	Luis Raul Marrero		
2019	"Hello"	Luis Raul Marrero		
2019	"Tiembla"	Luis Raul Marrero		
2019	"Cambio de Plan"	Luis Raul Marrero		
2019	"Hasta que llegué yo"	Luis Raul Marrero		
2019	"Lo que hace falta"	Indiomar		
2020	"Casa Nueva"	Indiomar featuring Wise "The Gold Pen"		
2021	"Amor a Ciegas"	Randy		
2021	"Yo no hago Caso"	Randy	Romances de una Nota	
2021	"La Funka"	Ozuna		

== Discography ==
- 1997: La Vieja Escuela Vol. 1
- 1998: Live
- 1999: Da' Moda
- 2003: Raggae Moon
- 2004: Da' Album
- 2005: Da' Klasic
- 2014: The Gold Pen
- 2015: 14F el Album
- 2016: Los Eleven
