= The Perfect Melody =

Studio album by Zion
- Released: June 5, 2007
- Recorded: October 2006 – 2007
- Genres: Reggaeton; hip hop; R&B
- Labels: Baby; SRC; CMG; Motown
- Producers: Akon; Nely; Tainy; DJ Memo; Walde; Dexter & Mister Greenz; DJ Giann; Álex Gárgolas; Mr. G; Eliel

Zion chronology
Motivando a la Yal: Special Edition (2005)	The Perfect Melody (2007)	Los Verdaderos (2010)

Singles from The Perfect Melody
- 1. "The Way She Moves" Released: April 21, 2007; 2. "Zun Da Da" Released: July 20, 2007; 3. "Amor de Pobre" Released: 2007

The Perfect Melody is the debut solo studio album by Puerto Rican singer Zion. Production of the album was handled by several musical producers including Akon, Nely el Arma Secreta, Tainy, and others. Guest appearances include Akon, Eddie Dee, Tonny Tun Tun, De La Ghetto and Jowell & Randy, among others. After temporarily separating from the duo Zion & Lennox, Zion began recording material for his debut solo album in October 2006.

"The Way She Moves" featuring Akon was selected as the lead single from the album. The song was released to radio stations on June 12, 2007, and released as a digital download on April 9, 2008. "Zun Da Da" served as the second single and was released to radio stations on July 20, 2007, and released as a digital download on April 9, 2008, as well. The Perfect Melody received a nomination for a Lo Nuestro Award for Urban Album of the Year.

== Background ==
Zion first became known in the duo Zion & Lennox. As a duo, they released one studio album, Motivando a la Yal (2004) and appeared on various compilation albums before then such as Luny Tunes' Mas Flow (2003). Motivando a la Yal peaked at number thirty-two and number thirteen on the Billboard Latin Albums and Billboard Latin Pop Albums, respectively. The special edition re-release performed better, reaching number ten on the Billboard Latin Albums chart. The album was well received by critics, with Evan Gutierrez of Allmusic calling it a "landmark album" and "one of the albums that artists will refer to in years to come as one of the records that shaped reggaeton and its future". Zion began working on The Perfect Melody in October 2006. Originally, the album was to be a compilation album of various artist, though after "bad experiences with new talent", Zion decided to work the project alone.

== Track listing ==
No.	Title	Producer(s)	Length
1.	"Zun Da Da"	DJ Memo	5:04
2.	"Habre La Puerta"	Nely	3:48
3.	"The Way She Moves" (featuring Akon)	Akon	3:53
4.	"Amor De Pobre" (featuring Eddie Dee)	Mr. G	3:58
5.	"Oh Mami"	Nely	3:02
6.	"Hagamos El Amor" (featuring Rell and Tonny Tun Tun)	Nely	4:06
7.	"Besame"	Tainy	3:16
8.	"Your Body" (featuring De La Ghetto)	Tainy	5:02
9.	"Te Vas"		4:47
10.	"Cuarto Nivel" (featuring Jowell & Randy)	Live Music	4:02
11.	"Money"		3:36
12.	"La Neta" (featuring Cruz Martínez)		3:29
13.	"Amor"	Walde	3:20
14.	"Periodico De Ayer"	Nely	3:16
15.	"Fantasma"	Young Hollywood	3:55
Total length:			58:34

The Perfect Melody – Target & iTunes Bonus Track
No.	Title	Length
1.	"María" (featuring Lennox)

The Perfect Melody – Best Buy Bonus Tracks
No.	Title	Length
1.	"Eres Tú"
2.	"Pide Más" (featuring Mackie Ranks)

The Perfect Melody – Walmart Bonus Tracks
No.	Title	Producer(s)	Length
1.	"Aventura en la Noche" (featuring Urban Symphony)
2.	"Sé Que Tú" (featuring Miguelito)	DJ Memo

Tracks 1 & 14 written by Gabriel Cruz (Wise).

== Charts ==
The album debuted at number 53 on the Billboard 200 and number two the Billboard Latin Albums chart, selling over 30,000 copies in its first week. The album was certified Platinum (Latin) by the RIAA in July 2007.

=== Charts ===
Chart (2007)	Peak position
US Billboard 200	53
US Rap Albums (Billboard)	7
US Latin Albums (Billboard)	2
US Latin Rhythm Albums (Billboard)	2

== Sales and certifications ==
Region	Certification	Certified units/sales
United States (RIAA)	Platinum (Latin)	100,000^{^}
^{^} Shipments figures based on certification alone.
