= Motivando a la Yal =

2004 studio album by Zion & Lennox

Studio album by Zion & Lennox
- Released: May 4, 2004
- Recorded: 2003–2004
- Genre: Reggaeton
- Length: 60:16
- Label: White Lion
- Producer: Luny Tunes; Noriega; DJ Sonic; Rifo; N.O.T.T.Y; DJ Blass; Rafy Mercenario; Monserrate & DJ Urba; Nely "El Arma Secreta"

Zion & Lennox chronology
Motivando a la Yal (2004)	Motivando a la Yal: Special Edition (2005)

Professional ratings
Review scores
Source	Rating
AllMusic	4/5 stars

Motivando a la Yal is the debut studio album by Puerto Rican reggaeton duo Zion & Lennox. It was released on May 4, 2004, by White Lion Records. The duo had already made waves with their hitmaking appearances on genre-defining compilation albums such as Más Flow, Desafío and The Noise: La Biografía. Motivando a la Yal was a success, aided by hits like "Doncella" and "Bandida". As of September 2007, the album sold 93,000 copies in the United States.

== Track listing ==
Motivando a la Yal track listing
No.	Title	Producer(s)	Length
1.	"Motivando la Yal" (intro)	Mr. Goldy	1:52
2.	"Prepárte"	NOTTY; Sonic	3:34
3.	"Bandida"	Luny Tunes	3:12
4.	"Yo Voy" (featuring Daddy Yankee)	Luny Tunes	3:52
5.	"Descontrólate"	DJ Blass; Bones	3:26
6.	"Doncella"	DJ Sonic	3:30
7.	"Enamórate" (featuring Yaga & Mackie)	Luny Tunes	3:02
8.	"Hasta Abajo" (featuring John Erick and Voltio)	DJ Blass; Bones	3:11
9.	"El Cantante" (featuring Tego Calderón and Voltio)	DJ Nelson	4:15
10.	"No Pares"	DJ Sonic	2:51
11.	"Hace Tiempo"	Noriega; Mercenario	2:21
12.	"Mírame"	Noriega; Mercenario	3:12
13.	"Quiero Tenerte"	Monserrate & DJ Urba	4:13
14.	"Ahora" (featuring Angel Doze)	Luny Tunes; Nely	3:01
15.	"Zion y Lennox"	Mr. Goldy	5:30
16.	"Doncella" (remix)	Eliel	3:10
17.	"Perdóname"	Eliel	2:49
18.	"No Me Compares"	Noriega	3:15
Total length:			60:16

== Samples ==
Enamórate

- "She's Hot" by T.O.K.
- "She's Hotter" by Pitbull feat. T.O.K.

== Chart performance ==
Chart (2004)	Peak position
U.S. Latin Pop Albums	13
U.S. Billboard Top Latin Albums	32

== Motivando a la Yal: Special Edition ==
Motivando a la Yal: Special Edition

Studio album by Zion & Lennox
- Released: June 7, 2005
- Genre: Reggaeton
- Length: 53:29
- Label: White Lion

Zion & Lennox chronology
Motivando a la Yal (2004)	Motivando a la Yal: Special Edition (2005)	The Perfect Melody (2007)

Motivando a la Yal: Special Edition is a re-edition from Zion & Lennox debut album Motivando a la Yal. It was released on June 7, 2005. The album has special appearances from Pitbull and Fatman Scoop.

=== Track listing ===
Motivando a la Yal: Special Edition track listing
No.	Title	Length
1.	"Don't Stop"	3:39
2.	"Bandida" (remix)	3:27
3.	"Yo Voy" (featuring Daddy Yankee)	3:51
4.	"Estas Tentándome"	4:25
5.	"Guaya, Guaya Rompe Cintura" (featuring Newtone, Angel Doze and De La Ghetto)	3:59
6.	"Doncella"	3:10
7.	"Dónde Están las Mamis?" (featuring Pitbull, Miri Ben-Ari and Fatman Scoop)	4:17
8.	"Ahora" (remix) (featuring Angel Doze, Voltio, and John Erick)	3:25
9.	"Hasta Abajo"	2:54
10.	"Bachatéalo"	3:01
11.	"Hace Tiempo"	2:21
12.	"Perdóname"	2:48
13.	"Ahora" (featuring Angel Doze)	3:00
14.	"Trayectoria" (remix)	5:30
15.	"Yo Voy a Llegar" (featuring Burden of Man)	3:42
Total length:		53:29

=== Chart performance ===
Chart (2005)	Peak position
U.S. Top Latin Albums (Billboard)	10
U.S. Top Heatseekers (Billboard)	9
