= Zion & Lennox =

Puerto Rican reggaeton duo

- Also known as: La Z y la L; Los Verdaderos; Los Diamantes Negros
- Origin: Carolina, Puerto Rico
- Genre: Reggaeton
- Years active: 2000–2006; 2008–2024
- Labels: White Lion; Sony BMG Norte; Pina; Warner Latina
- Past members: Félix Ortiz (Zion); Gabriel Pizarro (Lennox)

Zion & Lennox (also known as Zion y Lennox) was a Puerto Rican music duo from Carolina, Puerto Rico. In 2004, Zion & Lennox released their first studio album titled Motivando a la Yal under White Lion Records. After their first album, Zion & Lennox decided to start their own label, Baby Records Inc. The duo was made up of Félix Ortiz (Zion) and Gabriel Pizarro (Lennox).

== Personal lives ==
Félix Ortiz Torres and Gabriel Pizarro were born in Carolina, Puerto Rico. They met in 1992, while living in the same neighborhood and having common interests in reggaeton. Their common taste for music quickly became a serious passion and a reason to work together and thoroughly in the reggaeton genre, once Lennox's brother, whose nickname was Mackie, invited them to officially sing a theme in 2001, though they had already been a duo since 2000.

While Zion & Lennox developed a deep interest in the new genre during that time, their focus was distinct from the most typical themes within the underground scene. They gave reggaeton what they currently refer to as "the commercial touch", that is, less explicit and graphic lyrics.

Since then they had been very popular within the underground scene, until they came to have their first great opportunity in the 2003 compilation album Desafío by the producers Luny Tunes together with Noriega.

Both have relatives who are prominent singers in the reggaeton genre. Zion is the second cousin of chorus singer Jory Boy, who was part of the Nova & Jory duo, while Lennox is the brother of Luis Pizarro, better known as Mackie Ranks, of the former reggaeton duo Yaga y Mackie.

== Career ==
They have been in the music business for a long time. They had minor hits such as "Baila Conmigo" for the 2003 compilation album "Desafío" and "Me Pones Tensión" for the album The Noise: La Biografía. These hits, along with others in the near future and increased radio play gave them more recognition. This gave them the chance to appear in major reggaeton albums such as Luny Tunes' Mas Flow (2003) and Mas Flow 2 (2005), Blin Blin vol.1 (2003-4), Contra la Corriente (2004), and Cazadores, Primera Búsqueda (2005).

In May 2004, they released their first solo album, Motivando a la Yal. With the reggaeton genre becoming a worldwide phenomenon, Zion and Lennox's popularity increased. Motivando a la Yal: Special Edition was released a year later. The special edition had new songs along with remixed songs of the previous edition, such as "Don't Stop", "Bachatéalo", a remix to the song "Bandida", and a hip-hop remix of "Yo Voy" with Miri Ben-Ari, Fatman Scoop, and Pitbull entitled "Jump & Spread Out (DJ Precise and Cheeky Starr Version)".

Both Zion and Lennox are very active with solo songs. Zion has been more notable with songs like "Yo Voy a Llegar" for reggaeton producer DJ Nelson's compilation album Flow la Discoteka, "Alócate" released on Luny Tunes's album Mas Flow 2.5, and "Con Ella Me Quedaré" released in the fifth installment of the Álex Gárgolas series, entitled Gargolas: The Next Generation. He also has turned up a new hit, "Que Pasara", for DJ Nelson's Flow la Discoteka 2. Zion has released a solo album entitled The Perfect Melody on June 5, 2007, with appearances by artists such as Akon and Play-N-Skillz. "The Way She Moves" is the lead single from the album and features Akon. Lennox has been working on songs on his own album, but has also been very active in bringing new artist to his label "Toma Enterprise". The label is set to release an album named Los Mero Meros.

After three years of building their fan base and positive reputation with guest spots and compilation records, Zion & Lennox released their first full-length record, Motivando a la Yal. The record featured the work of producers Luny Tunes, Noriega, Nely el Arma Secreta, and Eliel, some of the most visible the style had to offer. Thanks to the record's success as it hit the charts with force, Zion & Lennox toured all over the Americas, performing before large and appreciative audiences. Soon industry demand and personal pressure caused Zion & Lennox to go in different directions. Boldly boasting to be one of the greatest singers ever to hail not only from Puerto Rico but all of Latin America, Ortiz started his own record label, Baby Records, for whom he is the flagship act and CEO. Lennox continues to make guest appearances and collaborate with important genre artists. Starting February 2008, Zion y Lennox engaged on a "reunited" tour promising a follow-up album In early 2010, they joined and signed a contract with Pina Records appearing on the compilation album Golpe de Estado (2010). In 2014, Zion and Lennox left Pina Records due to tensions financial allegations with Raphy Pina. In 2016, they started working on their 4th album, Motivan2, under their new record label, Warner Music Latina, to which they signed an exclusive deal in December 2015. Their 4th album, Motivan2, was released in September 16, 2016 which featured collaborations with Nicky Jam, J Balvin, Farruko, Daddy Yankee, Maluma & Don Omar. The music video for "Otra Vez", a song on that album featuring J Balvin, has received over 1.0 billion views on YouTube as of July 2020. On November 13, 2024, it was announced that Zion & Lennox would disband for Zion to focus on personal projects.

== Discography ==
- 2004: Motivando a la Yal
- 2010: Los Verdaderos
- 2016: Motivan2
- 2021: El Sistema

=== Singles ===
- "Estoy Esperando" (The Noise: The Beginning) (2001)
- "Quieren Acción" (The Godfather) (2002)
- "Hay Algo En Ti" (Mas Flow) (2003)
- "Me Pones En Tensión" (The Noise: La Biografía) (2003)
- "No Pierdas Tiempo" (Chosen Few El Documental) (2004)
- "No Me Compares" (Flow la Discoteka) (2004)
- "No Dejes Que Se Muera" (Luny Tunes Presents La Mision 4: The Take Over) (2004)
- "Cuanto Tengo Que Esperar" (MVP 2: The Grand Slam) (2005)
- "Don't Stop" (Motivando a la Yal: Special Edition) (2005)
- "Me Arrepiento" (Los Bandoleros) (2005)
- "Es Mejor Olvidarlo" (Feat. Baby Ranks) (Mas Flow 2) (2005)
- "Dejame Hacerte Mia" (Kilates 2: Segundo Impacto) (2005)
- "Aquí Estoy Yo" (El Bando Korrupto 2) (2004)
- "Quiero Tocarte" (The Score) (2003)
- "No Tengas Miedo" (Feat. Noriega) (Contra la Corriente) (2004)
- "Ella Me Mintio" (Feat. Ro-K & Gammy) (Malas Mañas) (2004)
- "Yo Voy" (feat. Daddy Yankee) (2004)
- "Te Hago El Amor" (Gargolas 4: The Return) (2003)
- "Ibas Caminando" (Los Cazadores: La Primera Busqueda) (2005)
- "Aguántate" (Feat. Johnny Prez) / (The Prezident) (2005)
- "Baila Conmigo" (Desafío) (2003)
- "Baila Pa' Mí" (MVP) (2003)
- "Tu Movimiento Me Excita" (Los Mozalbetes) (2003)
- "Esa Nena" (Ground Zero) (2003)
- "Me Dirijo A Ella" (Buddha's Family 2) (2005)
- "Tu Cuerpo Deseo" (El Desorden) (2003)
- "La Noche Es Larga" (Abusando del Genero) (2006)
- "Una Cita" (Echo Presenta: Invasión) (2007)
- "Latinas" (Feat. Elephant Man) (Caribbean Connection) (2008)
- "Seré Yo" (Remix) (Pasado, Presente & Futuro (Past, Present and Future) (2008))
- "Boom Boom" (Pasado, Presente & Futuro (Past, Present and Future) (2008))
- "Invisible" (Feat. Erre XI) (Luny Tunes Presents: Erre XI) (2008)
- "Ten Paciencia" (Remix) (Feat. Thalía) (2008)
- "Siempre Esta Dios" (Feat. Yari) (2008)
- "Sentir" (Feat. Guelo Star) (Pasado, Presente & Futuro (Past, Present and Future) (2008))
- "Tu Me Confundes" (Feat. Charlie Cruz) (Pasado, Presente & Futuro (Past, Present and Future) (2008))
- "Boom Boom" (Remix) (Feat. Alexis & Fido) (Pasado, Presente & Futuro (Past, Present and Future) (2008))
- "De Inmediato" (Pa' La Calle Mixtape) (2009)
- "Vamos En Serio" (Feat. Yaga & Mackie) (Pasado, Presente & Futuro (Past, Present and Future) (2008))
- "Tiemblo (Remix)" (Feat. Baby Rasta & Gringo) (Unreleased) (2009)
- "Ahora Es Que Es" (Pa' La Calle Mixtape) (2009)
- "Dime Baby" (Feat. Fusion Mobb) (The Gold Pen) (2009)
- "Con Una Sonrisa" (Feat. O.G Black & Guayo "El Bandido") (La Hora Cero) (2009)
- "Ella Me Motiva" (Feat. Arcángel) (Pa' La Calle Mixtape) (2009)
- "Mi Cama Huele a Ti" (Feat. Tito El Bambino) (El Patrón) (2009)
- "Mi Cama Huele A Ti" (Salsa version) (Feat. Charlie Cruz)
- "Amor Genuino" (Pa' La Calle Mixtape) (2009)
- "Colora'" (Feat. Casa de Leones) (Pa' La Calle Mixtape) (2009)
- "Angeles & Demonios" (Feat. Syko "El Terror") (Pa' La Calle Mixtape) (2009)
- "Fuiste Tu" (Pa' La Calle Mixtape) (2009)
- "Me Atrae" (Pa' La Calle Mixtape) (2009)
- "Se Le Voy A Dar" (Pa' La Calle Mixtape) (2009)
- "Hagamos El Amor Part. 2" (Pa' La Calle Mixtape) (2009)
- "Daña Party" (Pa' La Calle Mixtape) (2009)
- "Mujeriego" (Pa' La Calle Mixtape) (2009)
- "Tengo Que Decir" (Golpe de Estado) (2009)
- "Amor Genuino" (Feat. De la Ghetto) (2009)
- "Si Te Gusta" (Feat. Onyx "Creacion Divina") (2010)
- "La Española" (The Diamond) (2010)
- "Como Curar" (Los Verdaderos) (2010)
- "Momentos" (Los Verdaderos) (2010)
- "Hoy Lo Siento" (Feat. Tony Dize) (Los Verdaderos) (2011)
- "Tu Ta' Buena" (Feat. Vakero) (2011)
- "Cantazo" (Feat. Yomo) (2012)
- "Kamasutra" (Feat. El Poeta Callejero) (2013)
- "La Botella" (2013)
- "Pierdo La Cabeza" (2014)
- "Que Vas Hacer" (Blin Blin Vol. 1) (2003)
- "Embriágame" (Motivan2) (2016)
- "Otra Vez" (Feat. J Balvin) (2016)
- "Súbeme la Radio" (with Enrique Iglesias and Descemer Bueno) (2017)
- "Otra Vez" (remix) (Feat. Ludmilla)
- "A Forgotten Spot (Olvidado)" (with Ivy Queen, De la Ghetto, PJ Sin Suela and Lucecita Benitez)
- "La player (Bandolera)" (2018)
- "No Es Justo" (with J Balvin) (2018)
- "Sistema" (2019)
- "Dulcecitos" (with Piso 21) (2020)
- "Bésame" (with Daddy Yankee, Play-N-Skillz) (2020).
- "All Night" (2020)
- "Guayo" (With Anuel AA, Haze) (2020)
- "Te Mueves" (With Natti Natasha) (2020)

== Zion discography ==
- The Perfect Melody (2007)
- Flow Factory (2007)
- Live El Choliseo (Welcome To My World) (2007)

=== Singles ===
- "Yo Voy A Llegar" (Flow la Discoteka) (2004)
- "Sólo Una Noche" (El Que Habla Con Las Manos) (2005)
- "Con Ella Me Quedaré" (Gargolas: The Next Generation) (2006)
- "Sigue Ahí" (Ft. Memphis Bleek & De la Ghetto) (Los Rompe Discotekas) (2006)
- "No Falla" (Cuban Link ft. Zion) (Chain Reaction) (2005)
- "Hello" (Mas Flow: Los Benjamins) (2006)
- "Alócate" (Mas Flow 2.5) (2006)
- "Dos Jueyes" (ft. Domingo Quiñones) (Los Cocorocos) (2006)
- "Que Pasará" (Flow la Discoteka 2) (2007)
- "Veo" (El Pentágono) (2007)
- "Fantasma" (The Perfect Melody) (2007)
- "Zun Da Da" (The Perfect Melody) (2007)
- "The Way She Moves" (Ft. Akon) (The Perfect Melody) (2007)
- "Amor de Pobre" (Ft. Eddie Dee) (The Perfect Melody) (2007)
- "Money" (The Perfect Melody) (2007)
- "Periódico de Ayer" (The Perfect Melody) (2007)
- "Ábre La Puerta" (The Perfect Melody) (2007)
- "Vamonos Al Club" (Ft. Tego Calderón) (2007)
- "Independiente" (Los Bravos) (2007)
- "Pa'l Piso" (Ft. Element Black) (2008)
- "Sabanas Mojadas" (2008)
- "Fantasía" (2008)
- "Entre Cuatro Paredes" (Los Sikarios) (2008)
- "Showtime" (Ft. Angel & Khriz) (2008)
- "Fuera del Planeta" (Remix) (Ft. Eloy, Jowell & Randy) (2008)
- "Seré Yo" (2008)
- "Sabanas Mojadas" (Remix) (Ft. Jowell) (2008)
- "Tenerla Es Sonar" (2008)
- "Se Fue" (Ft. MJ) (Mi Sentimiento) (2008)
- "Tease Me" (Flow Factory) (2009)
- "La Velita" (Golpe de Estado) (2009) (with Ivy Queen, Arcángel and Jadiel)
- "Muñequita de la Mafia" (Ft. Wambo & Farruko) (2015)
- "Súbeme la Radio" (Enrique Iglesias featuring Descemer Bueno & Lennox)

== Lennox discography ==
- Los Mero Meros (2007) (compilation album)

=== Singles ===
- "La Botella" (MadMusick) (2013)
- "Somos Los Mero Meros" (Ft. Guelo Star) (Los Mero Meros) (2007)
- "Sola y Triste" (Ft. Jonny) (Unreleased) (2007)
- "Hace Tiempo" (Motivando a la Yal) (2004)
- "Un Amor Así" (Ft. Newton) (Da' Music: Reloaded) (2005)
- "Tanto Dolor" (Ft. Noriega) (Sin Control) (2006)
- "Te Recordaré" (Ft. Norrys) (Los Bandoleros Reloaded) (2006)
- "Hablando Claro" (Ft. Arcángel) (2007)
- "Ahí Na Más" (Los Mero Meros) (2007)
- "Lo Importante Es" (K-Libre) (2007)
- "Esto No Para" (Línea de Fuego) (2008)
- "Bailaremos" (La Evolucion) (2008)
- "Solos Tu y Yo" (Ft. Ricky Quiñones) (Unreleased) (2008)
- "Diferente" (Ft. Los Insuperables) (2009)
- "Eres Mia Hoy" (Ft. Kartiel)
