= Héctor el Father discography =

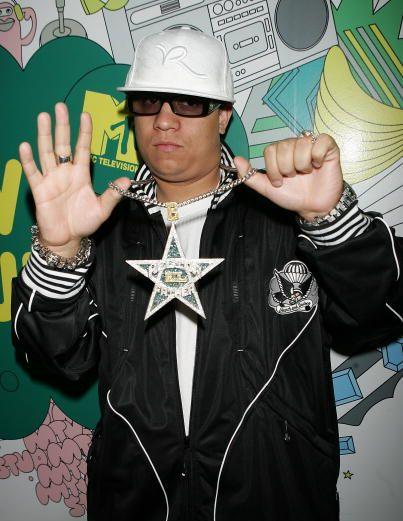
- Héctor el Father on MTV
- Studio albums: 2
- Live albums: 1
- Compilation albums: 7
- Singles: 7
- Music videos: 21

Héctor Luis Delgado Román is a former Puerto Rican rapper, singer and record producer, formerly known by the artistic names Héctor el Father and Héctor el Bambino. He rose to fame as a member of the duo Héctor & Tito (with Tito El Bambino) from 1996 to 2004, releasing four studio albums and a commercially successful live album.

As a solo artist, he was very successful in 2006 and 2007, selling more than 500,000 copies between his first studio album, The Bad Boy, and a compilation titled Los Rompe Discotekas, which was released under Roc-La-Familia. This American record label was founded in 2005 by rapper Jay-Z, focusing on Latin hip hop and reggaeton. As a producer, Delgado has worked with several reggaeton artists producers, as well as Emilio Estefan. He announced his retirement in 2008 in order to become a preacher but had a series of "Farewell Concerts" that went until May 2010. During his entire solo career, Héctor released four charting albums and seven charting singles, and has 400,000 certified units in the United States.

In 2008, Víctor Alexis Rivera Santiago, most known as Lele, claimed that Héctor owed him royalties for 40 songs written between 2003 and that year, and sued him. Both artists had issues between them, and Lele released a 12-minute-long diss track titled "O Me Pagas" with his duo companion Endo, claiming one million dollars for the songs he wrote for Delgado. They reconciled in 2010, and later that year Lele was shot to death 24 times in Trujillo Alto, Puerto Rico.

Despite being retired, Héctor participated in the 2010 compilation Golpe de Estado and in 2012 he collaborated with Wise, who wrote some of his songs and who is also a close friend. He currently works at a radio station rented by him and located in Juncos, Puerto Rico, where he conducts a Christian radio show named Un Nuevo Despertar (Spanish for A New Awakening) alongside Julio Voltio.

== Albums ==
=== Studio albums ===
Year	Title	Peak chart positions				Certifications (sales thresholds)
Year	Title	US	US Latin	US Rap	US Latin Pop	Certifications (sales thresholds)
2006	The Bad Boy: Released: November 21, 2006; Label: Machete, VI; Format: CD, digital download	81	2	25	—	RIAA: Platinum (Latin)
2008	Juicio Final: Released: October 21, 2008; Label: Machete, VI; Format: CD, digital download	113	3	—	—	
With Tito El Bambino
1998	Violencia Musical: Released: July 1998; Label: VI; Format: CD	—	—	—	—	
2000	Nuevo Milenio: Released: 2000; Label: Lester; Format: CD	—	—	—	—	
2002	Lo De Antes: Released: April 5, 2002; Label: Black Jack; Format: CD	—	—	—	—	
2002	A la Reconquista: Released: November 5, 2002; Label: VI; Format: CD, digital download	—	9	—	8	

=== Compilation albums ===
Year	Title	Peak chart positions					Certifications (sales thresholds)
Year	Title	US	US Latin	US Latin Rhythm	US Rap	US Comp.	Certifications (sales thresholds)
2002	The Godfather: Released: 2002; Label: Pina; Format: CD	—	—	—	—	—	
2004	Los Anormales: Released: December 21, 2004; Label: Gold Star, Universal Latino; Format: CD	—	4	—	—	5	RIAA: Platinum (Latin)
2005	Sangre Nueva (with Naldo): Released: August 30, 2005; Label: Gold Star, Universal Latino; Format: CD	131	3	2	—	2	
2005	Gold Star Music: Reggaeton Hits: Released: December 20, 2005; Label: Gold Star, Universal Latino; Format: CD	188	5	—	—	—	
2006	Los Rompe Discotekas: Released: June 27, 2006; Label: Roc-La-Familia, Machete, VI, Gold Star; Format: CD	31	1	1	10	2	RIAA: 2× Platinum (Latin)
2007	El Rompe Discoteka: The Mix Album: Released: September 25, 2007; Label: Machete, VI; Format: CD, digital download	—	—	—	—	—	
2008	Mi Trayectoria: Released: June 17, 2008; Label: Gold Star, Machete; Format: CD	—	—	—	—	—	
With Tito El Bambino
2005	Season Finale: Released: August 16, 2005; Label: Machete, VI; Format: CD, digital download	—	57	—	—	—	
2007	The Ultimate Urban Collection: Released: May 22, 2007; Label: Machete; Format: CD	—	—	—	—	—	

=== Live albums ===
Year	Title	Peak chart positions			Certifications (sales thresholds)
Year	Title	US Latin	US Latin Pop	US Heat.	Certifications (sales thresholds)
2007	Bad Boy: The Concert: Released: June 26, 2007; Label: Machete, VI; Format: CD, digital download	—	—	—	
With Tito El Bambino
2003	La Historia Live: Released: May 20, 2003; Label: VI; Format: CD, digital download	4	2	15	RIAA: 2× Platinum (Latin)

== Singles ==
Year	Title	Peak chart positions			Album
Year	Title	US Latin	US Trop.	US Latin Pop	Album
2005	"No Hay Nadie" (Featuring Yomo and Víctor Manuelle)	15	13	—	Gold Star Music: Reggaeton Hits
2006	"Here We Go Yo" (Featuring Jay-Z)	15	11	—	Los Rompe Discotekas
2006	"El Teléfono" (Featuring Wisin & Yandel)	—	16	—	Los Rompe Discotekas
2006	"Sola"	1	1	—	The Bad Boy
2007	"Pa' La Tumba"	—	39	—	The Bad Boy: The Most Wanted Edition
2008	"Te Vi Llorar"	—	29	—	Juicio Final
2008	"Y Llora"	47	14	24	Juicio Final
As featured performer
2004	"Rociarlos" (Ivy Queen featuring Gran Omar and Héctor el Father)	—	—	—	Real
2005	"Mayor Que Yo" (Luny Tunes featuring Baby Ranks, Tony Tun Tun, Wisin & Yandel, Daddy Yankee and Héctor el Father)	3	1	—	Mas Flow 2
2006	"Noche de Entierro (Nuestro Amor)" (Luny Tunes featuring Tony Tun Tun, Wisin & Yandel, Héctor el Father, Zion and Daddy Yankee)	6	4	27	Mas Flow: Los Benjamins

== Music videos ==
Year	Title	Other artist(s)	Album
2004	"Noche De Travesura"	Divino	Flow La Discoteka
2004	"Tú Quieres Duro"		La Misión 4: The Take Over
2004	"Vamos A Matarnos En La Raya"		El Que Habla Con Las Manos
2004	"Yo Sigo Aquí"	Naldo	Los Anormales
2005	"Dale Castigo"		Mas Flow 2
2005	"Calor"		The MVP, Vol. 2: The Grand Slam
2005	"Sácala"	Wisin & Yandel and Don Omar	Sangre Nueva
2005	"Déjale Caer To' El Peso"	Yomo	Sangre Nueva
2005	"Que Se Sienta" / "La Que Noquea"	Yomo and Ariel	Gold Star Music: Reggaeton Hits
2005	"No Hay Nadie"	Yomo and Víctor Manuelle	Gold Star Music: Reggaeton Hits
2006	"El Teléfono"	Wisin & Yandel	Los Rompe Discotekas
2006	"Tiburón"	Yomo and Polaco	Los Rompe Discotekas
2006	"Hello Mama"	Yomo	Chosen Few II: El Documental
2006	"Sola"		The Bad Boy
2006	"Rumor De Guerra"		The Bad Boy
2007	"Hola Bebé"	Jowell & Randy	The Bad Boy: The Most Wanted Edition
2007	"Pa' La Tumba"		The Bad Boy: The Most Wanted Edition
2007	"No Hacen Na'"	Yomo	The Bad Boy: The Most Wanted Edition
2008	"Payaso"		Juicio Final
2008	"Si Me Tocaras"	Harry Maldonado	Juicio Final
2008	"Y Llora"		Juicio Final
As featured performer
2004	"Ronca"	Don Omar and Zion	The Last Don: The Gold Series
2006	"Noche de Entierro (Nuestro Amor)"	Tony Tun Tun, Wisin & Yandel and Daddy Yankee	Mas Flow: Los Benjamins
2007	"Down (Remix)"	Rakim & Ken-Y	Masterpiece Commemorative Edition
2007	"Los Capos"	Jowell & Randy, Julio Voltio, Guelo Star, Zion, Ñejo & Dalmata and De La Ghetto	Los Capos

== Album appearances ==
Year	Title	Other artist(s)	Album
2003	"Caseríos"	Don Omar	The Last Don
2004	"Noche De Travesura"	Divino	Flow La Discoteka
2004	"Ronca"	Don Omar and Zion	The Last Don: The Gold Series
2004	"De Niña Te Hice Mi Mujer"	Don Omar	The Last Don Live
2004	"Agárrala"	Trebol Clan and Don Omar	Los Bacatranes
2004	"Corre Y Píllala"	Trebol Clan and Jomar	Los Bacatranes
2004	"Gata Fiera"	Trebol Clan and Joan	Los Bacatranes
2004	"Mi Vida"	Trebol Clan	Los Bacatranes
2004	"Tú Quieres Duro"		La Misión 4: The Take Over
2004	"Vamos A Matarnos En La Raya"		El Que Habla Con Las Manos
2004	"Rociarlos"	Ivy Queen and Gran Omar	Real
2005	"Dale Castigo"		Mas Flow 2
2005	"Mayor Que Yo"	Baby Ranks, Tony Tun Tun, Wisin & Yandel and Daddy Yankee	Mas Flow 2
2005	"Calor"		The MVP, Vol. 2: The Grand Slam
2005	"La Barría"	Wisin & Yandel	Pa'l Mundo
2006	"Royal Rumble	Wise, Zion, Daddy Yankee, Wisin, Yomo, Franco el Gorila, Don Omar, Arcángel and Alexis	Mas Flow: Los Benjamins
2006	"Noche de Entierro (Nuestro Amor)"	Tony Tun Tun, Wisin & Yandel, Zion and Daddy Yankee	Mas Flow: Los Benjamins
2006	"Hello Mama"	Yomo	Chosen Few II: El Documental
2007	"Los Capos"	Jowell & Randy, Julio Voltio, Guelo Star, Zion, Ñejo & Dalmata and De La Ghetto	Los Capos
2007	"Tensión"	Daddy Yankee	El Cartel: The Big Boss
2007	"Ando Ready"		Invasión
2008	"Up In The Club"	Ce'Cile	Caribbean Connection
2010	"Ven Donde Mí"		Golpe de Estado
2012	"Hoy"	Wise	The Gold Pen

== See also ==
- Héctor & Tito discography
