= Los Anormales =

Compilation album by Héctor el Father
- Released: December 21, 2004
- Genre: Reggaeton
- Label: Gold Star; Universal Latino
- Producer: Héctor el Father; Luny Tunes; Nely; Nesty "La Mente Maestra"; Naldo; DJ Joe; Monserrate & DJ Urba; DJ Giann; Santana

Héctor el Father chronology
The Godfather (2002)	Los Anormales (2004)	Sangre Nueva (2005)

Los Anormales (English: The Abnormals) is a compilation album released on December 21, 2004, by reggaeton artist Hector "El Bambino", latter known as Héctor el Father. It was his first album released as solo artist and to be produced and marketed by his own label Gold Star Music.

Los Anormales was produced by the hottest reggaeton producers at the time including Luny Tunes, Nely El Alma Secreta, Naldo, Monserrate & Dj Urba, Nesty La Mente Maestra and executive produced by Hector el Father. The album features the most important reggaeton artists at the time such as Daddy Yankee, Don Omar, Trebol Clan, Divino, Zion and launch to the mainstream the musical career of the duo Alexis & Fido.

Los Anormales broke all record sales in Puerto Rico selling over 130,000 copies were sold in just two days. According to Hector el Father former manager the album sold more than half million of copies. To promote the album, the artist embark on Los Anormales tour visiting United States and Latin America. A DVD package was released on May 24, 2005.

== Background ==
During the 1990s and Earlys 2000s, Hector el Father was part of Hector & Tito, a popular reggaeton duo that broke several records. In 2002, become the first reggaeton act to sold out a massive concert at the Coliseo Roberto Clemente. Later that year, they next studio album A La Reconquista become the first reggaeton album to debut at the Top 10 of US Billboard Top Latin Albums and eventually it sold 200,000 becoming the first reggaeton album to sold that much. In 2003, the album won Latin Rap Album of the Year at the 2003 Latin Billboard Music Awards becoming the first reggaeton act of won a Billboard Award.

Following this success, the duo released La Historia Live which become the first reggaeton album to be certified multi-platinum (Latin) by RIAA for selling 200,000 copies. Shortly that, the duo toured South America performing at music festivals at huge venues and stadium incluind Colombia and Venezuela. Despite the success, the duo decided to split on Summer of 2003 due to creative differences, However continued doing presetantion together til August 2004, visiting Mexico, Peru, Honduras, Spain and Guatemala.

Following their split, Hector founded his own label Gold Star Music with the distribution by Universal Music Latino and started working on his own solo work and to sign and produce new reggaeton acts. Recording seasons started on early-mid 2004 at Puerto Rico. The album was considered his first solo debut. The compilation has the participation of the producers Luny Tunes, Nely El Alma Screta, Nesty La Mente Masestra, Naldo, Dj Joe, Monserrate & Dj Urba, Dj Gian and Santana. Also, it has songs performed by hot reggaeton act at the time such as Don Omar and Daddy Yankee and helped to launch to the fame reggaeton acts such as Yaviah, Trebol Clam and Alexis y Fido. It was the first musical project that Hector el Bambino appears as executive producer and at the album title.

== Commercial reception ==
Los Anormales debuted at number 4 on US Billboard Top Latin Albums on the issue of the week January 8, 2005. The album broke all time sales records in Puerto Rico selling 130,000 copies in just two days. Eventually, the album sold more than 200,000 copies in the United States. According to "El Father" long time manager, the album sold around 500,000 copies. In March 2005, the album was certified by platinum (Latin) for shipping 200,000 copies.

== Track listing ==
1. "Intro Los Anormales"
2. "Noche de Terror" (by Héctor & Tito) (produced by Luny Tunes and Nely)
3. "Salvaje" (by Don Omar) (produced by Luny Tunes & Nely)
4. "Machete" (by Daddy Yankee) (produced by Monserrate & DJ Urba)
5. "Agárrate" (by Trebol Clan)
6. "Llégale" (by Divino) (produced by Luny Tunes, Nely)
7. "Mirándonos" (by Zion and Héctor el Father) (produced by Nely, Naldo)
8. "La Cuatrera" (by Jomar)
9. "Gata Michu Michu" (by Alexis & Fido) (produced by Luny Tunes, Naldo, Nesty)
10. "Vamos Pa' La Calle"
11. "Malvada" (by Algarete & Jomar) (produced by Luny Tunes, Nely, Naldo)
12. "Yo Sigo Aquí" (by Héctor el Father and Naldo) (produced by Naldo, Nely, Santana)
13. "Contacto" (by Yaviah)
14. "Tú y Yo" (by Trebol Clan)
15. "Vámonos" (by Angel Doze)
16. "Pasan Los Días" (by Angel & Khriz) (produced by DJ Giann, Santana)
17. "Tu Cuerpo Me Está Tentando" (by Guayo Man and Ñengo Flow)

== Charts ==
Chart (2005)	Peak Position
US Heatseekers Albums (Billboard)	5
US Top Latin Albums (Billboard)	4

== Sales and certifications ==
Region	Certification	Certified units/sales
United States (RIAA)	Platinum (Latin)	100,000^{^}
^{^} Shipments figures based on certification alone.
