= Glou =

Studio album by Glory
- Released: June 28, 2005
- Recorded: 2005
- Genre: Reggaeton
- Length: 47:16
- Label: VI; Machete
- Producer: Álex Gárgolas (exec). Mario VI; Escobar; Eliel

Glou is the debut album from Puerto Rican reggaeton singer Glory. She composed almost all of the songs on the album.

== Track listing ==
1. "Intro" – 0:46
2. "Perreo 101" (Glory) – 3:03
3. "Acelerá" (Glory, Álex Quiles) – 4:06
4. "La Traicionera" [featuring Don Omar] (Glory, Don Omar, Eduardo Reyes) – 4:10
5. "Dale, Dale" (José Miguel Velázquez) – 3:18
6. "Sin Freno" (Glory) – 3:35
7. "Un Paso" (Glory, Eric Pérez, Eduardo Reyes) – [ – 3:30
8. "Ahora Regresas" (Glory) – 3:31
9. "A Popolear" [feat Valentino] (Glory) – 3:31
10. "Flor del Barrio" [featuring Gallego] (Glory, José Raúl González, Álex Quiles) – 4:30
11. "Te Vas" (Glory) – 4:11
12. "Lento" (Glory, Marvin Rasario D., Eric Pérez) – 3:36
13. "La Popola" (Glory) – 3:13
14. "Outro" – 2:16

== Singles ==
- "La Popola", later re-released
- "Perreo 101"
- "La Tracionera" [featuring Don Omar]
- "Acelerá"
- "Lento"
- "Un Paso"

== Chart performance ==
Chart (2005)	Peak Position
US Heatseekers Albums (Billboard)	32
US Latin Albums (Billboard)	22
US Latin Rhythm Albums (Billboard)	6

== Facts ==
- "Te Vas" is featured on "Reggaeton Hitmakers Love Stories".
- "Outro" is featured on "Reggaeton Best Remix".
- She is signed to Don Omar's All Star Records
- The song "La Popola" has been banned in many Latin American countries due to its vulgar lyrics. In the Dominican Republic "Popola" is slang for a woman's vagina.
