= Before & After (Magnate & Valentino album) =

Studio album by Magnate & Valentino
- Released: March 14, 2006
- Genre: Reggaeton
- Label: Machete Music

Magnate & Valentino chronology
Sin Límite (2004)	Before & After (2006)	Quimica Perfecta (2009)

Magnate chronology
Before & After (2006)	Progresivo (2007)

Valentino chronology
Before & After (2006)	Los Compadres: La Perfecta Ocasión (2006)

Before & After is an album containing a collection of the greatest hits by Puerto Rican reggaeton duo, Magnate & Valentino.

== Track listing ==
1. "Anda" [Versión 2006]
2. "Gata Celosa" (feat. Héctor y Tito)
3. "Ya Lo Sé"
4. "Vuelve a Mí"
5. "Métele Dembow" (feat. Mario Vi)
6. "Te Buscaré" (Magnate only)
7. "Quiero Sentir Tu Cuerpo"
8. "Dile A Ella" (feat. Don Omar)
9. "Prohibido" (Valentino only)
10. "Mujer Traicionada" (Magnate only)
11. "Fuera De Control" (New track) (Magnate only)
12. "Persígueme" (New track) (Valentino only)
13. "Reggaetón" (New track)

== Charts ==
Chart (2006)	Peak position
US Top Latin Albums (Billboard)	19
US Latin Rhythm Albums (Billboard)	7
US Heatseekers Albums (Billboard)	18
