= Gocho =

Musical artist (born March 19, 1982)

- Born: José Ángel Torres Castro; March 19, 1982 (age 43); Carolina, Puerto Rico
- Other names: El Lápiz de Platino (The Platinum Pen)
- Occupations: Songwriter; singer; record producer
- Years active: 2003-present
- Musical career
- Genres: Reggaeton
- Instrument: Vocals
- Labels: VI; Machete; Venemusic; Universal Latino

José Ángel Torres Castro (born March 19, 1982), better known as Gocho, is a Puerto Rican songwriter, singer and record producer, nicknamed "El Lápiz de Platino" (in English, The Platinum Pen). In 2003, with his first hit as a producer, "Dale Don Dale" with Don Omar, Gocho was a forerunner in the commercial reggaeton movement.

He continued to reap other successes such as the production of the songs "Ven Báilalo" by Angel & Khriz and "La Tortura" by Shakira and Alejandro Sanz, collaborating in the production of this single that received several Latin Grammys. In his debut as a performer, he managed to enter Billboard's Hot Latin Songs chart with his single "Dándole" along with Omega and Jowell.

In 2023, he presents a new album with the participation of great urban performers with a superior message, beginning with "Solución" with the Puerto Rican singer Funky, released on March 3.

== Musical career ==
=== Early years ===
At just 19 years old at the time, he set out to enter the music business, signing to work with producer Manolo Guatauba. Gocho decided to produce his first album of "various artists" of reggaeton, entitled "MVP". The album came out in December 2002 and featured important performers such as Zion & Lennox, Yaviah, Ángel & Khriz and Don Omar, who performed the hit Dale Don Dale, being the first reggaeton song to air on all radio stations in Puerto Rico, not just on Mix 107.7 FM, the reggaeton-only station. The record sold more than 100,000 copies.

=== MVP Records ===
Months later, Gocho met Raúl López, and together they founded the MVP Records label. In 2003, he produced Divino's album Todo A la Tiempo by him and Los MVP by Ángel and Khriz. Later, his most recognized work would come: being the co-producer of the pop and reggaeton versions of Shakira's hit with Alejandro Sanz, La Tortura, a song that remained on the list of the 100 most popular songs on Billboard since its release. In July 2005, Gocho presented the compilation album Los MVP 2: The Grandslam, which debuted at number four on Billboard's Top Latin Albums chart.

He would work with Daddy Yankee for his 2006 album, El Cartel: The Big Boss. In December 2006, Gocho made his debut as a singer together with his colleagues Valentino and Mario VI, signing as an exclusive artist for the VI Music and Machete Music record labels. Later in 2008, he was an interpreter of the song "Na de Na", by Ángel & Khriz with John Eric, which was a resounding success. After this, he stated that he would take a much-needed break to make up for the time he lost with his children.

=== Mi Música and Melodías de Oro (2011-2015) ===
The hiatus would culminate in 2011, when Mi Música arrived, his debut album under the independent label New Era Entertainment, Venemusic and Universal Music Latino. The album synthesizes his style with a fusion of reggaeton and vallenato, merengue, mambo and electronics, among others. "Dándole" was his first single, in which he is accompanied by Jowell, from the Jowell & Randy duo and in the remix, with the Dominican Omega, which was a resounding success, entering Billboard's Hot Latin Songs list. The second single would be "Si Te Digo la Verdad". This theme, where Wisin participated, managed to enter the Billboard Hot Latin Songs list again. "Desde El Primer Beso" would arrive in 2014, a song that has the participation of Tito El Bambino and Wisin.

In 2015, Gocho and Santana joined forces with their teamwork to resume this concept with the production Melodías de Oro. Wisin, Tito el Bambino, De La Ghetto, Zion & Lennox and J Álvarez participated in the project. This album managed to position itself in Latin Airplay with the song "No me llamas", performed by Gocho. In that same year, together with Farruko, they signed with Sony Music Latin.

=== No Soy el Mismo (2017-present) ===
In 2017, he is recognized by Broadcast Music, Inc. as Latin Contemporary Composer of the Year. Following in the footsteps of other artists such as Héctor Delgado and Julio Ramos, José Torres turned to Christianity. Currently, he is a pastor at the Casa de Oración Pan de Vida church, while preparing his second album as a soloist (the first of Christian content) entitled No Soy el Mismo.

In recent years, he has put aside his work as a singer and has focused again as a writer and producer of songs by artists such as Ángel y Khriz, Carlos Vives, Ozuna, Rauw Alejandro, Funky, and the Wisin & Yandel duo, for example. However, in 2021 he would retire from music in general to dedicate himself to being a pastor permanently.

In 2023, he returned to music as an interpreter, releasing three singles: "Solución" with Funky, "Hablaré" with Alex Zurdo, and "Gozo" as a soloist, singles from his announced debut album as a Christian music singer.

== Discography ==
- 2002: MVP
- 2005: Los MVP 2: The Grand Slam
- 2006: Los Compadres: La Perfecta Ocasión (with Valentino and Mario VI)
- 2011: Mi Música
- 2015: Melodías de Oro (with Santana)
- 2023: No Soy el Mismo

=== Singles ===
Title	Year	Peak chart positions									Certifications
Title	Year	US Hot 100	US Latin	US Latin Rhythm	US Latin Pop	US Latin Tropical	MEX	SPA	VEN	COL	Certifications
"Desde el Primer Beso" (Gocho featuring Wisin)	2013	—	35	23	18	11	—	—	—	—	
"Dándole" (Gocho featuring Jowell)	2014	—	22	6	21	5	—	—	8	—	

== Awards and honours ==
- 2017: Contemporary Latino Composers of the Year - BMI
- "Na de Na" with John Eric and Ángel and Khriz, a song located at #86 as "The Best Reggaeton Songs of All Time" according to Rolling Stone.
