= List of Billboard Latin Rhythm Albums number ones of 2008 =

The Latin Rhythm Albums chart is a music chart published in Billboard magazine. This data is compiled by Nielsen SoundScan from a sample that includes music stores, music departments at electronics and department stores, internet sales (both physical and digital) and verifiable sales from concert venues in the United States to determine the top-selling Latin rhythm albums in the United States each week. The chart is composed of studio, live, and compilation releases by Latin artists performing in the Latin hip-hop, urban, dance and reggaeton, the most popular Latin rhythm music genres.

There were seven number-one albums in 2008. Panaminian DJ Flex hit the chart for the first time and peaked number one for 16 weeks with his debut album Te Quiero: Romantic Style in da World. Reggaeton duo Wisin & Yandel stayed at the number one for 18 weeks with Wisin vs. Yandel: Los Extraterrestres and become the second best selling Latin album of the year with 250,000 copies.

== Albums ==
Chart date	Album	Artist(s)	Reference
January 5	Wisin vs. Yandel: Los Extraterrestres	Wisin & Yandel	
January 12	Wisin vs. Yandel: Los Extraterrestres	Wisin & Yandel	
January 19	Wisin vs. Yandel: Los Extraterrestres	Wisin & Yandel	
January 26	Wisin vs. Yandel: Los Extraterrestres	Wisin & Yandel	
February 2	Wisin vs. Yandel: Los Extraterrestres	Wisin & Yandel	
February 9	Wisin vs. Yandel: Los Extraterrestres	Wisin & Yandel	
February 16	Wisin vs. Yandel: Los Extraterrestres	Wisin & Yandel	
February 23	Te Quiero: Romantic Style in da World	Flex	
March 1	Te Quiero: Romantic Style in da World	Flex	
March 8	Te Quiero: Romantic Style in da World	Flex	
March 15	Te Quiero: Romantic Style in da World	Flex	
March 22	Te Quiero: Romantic Style in da World	Flex	
March 29	Te Quiero: Romantic Style in da World	Flex	
April 5	Te Quiero: Romantic Style in da World	Flex	
April 12	Te Quiero: Romantic Style in da World	Flex	
April 19	Te Quiero: Romantic Style in da World	Flex	
April 26	Te Quiero: Romantic Style in da World	Flex	
May 3	Te Quiero: Romantic Style in da World	Flex	
May 10	Te Quiero: Romantic Style in da World	Flex	
May 17	Te Quiero: Romantic Style in da World	Flex	
May 24	Te Quiero: Romantic Style in da World	Flex	
May 31	Te Quiero: Romantic Style in da World	Flex	
June 7	Te Quiero: Romantic Style in da World	Flex	
June 14	Wisin vs. Yandel: Los Extraterrestres	Wisin & Yandel	
June 21	Wisin vs. Yandel: Los Extraterrestres	Wisin & Yandel	
June 28	Wisin vs. Yandel: Los Extraterrestres	Wisin & Yandel	
July 5	Wisin vs. Yandel: Los Extraterrestres	Wisin & Yandel	
July 12	Wisin vs. Yandel: Los Extraterrestres	Wisin & Yandel	
July 19	Wisin vs. Yandel: Los Extraterrestres	Wisin & Yandel	
July 26	Wisin vs. Yandel: Los Extraterrestres	Wisin & Yandel	
August 2	Wisin vs. Yandel: Los Extraterrestres	Wisin & Yandel	
August 9	Wisin vs. Yandel: Los Extraterrestres	Wisin & Yandel	
August 16	Wisin vs. Yandel: Los Extraterrestres	Wisin & Yandel	
August 23	Wisin vs. Yandel: Los Extraterrestres	Wisin & Yandel	
August 30	Talento de Barrio	Daddy Yankee	
September 6	Talento de Barrio	Daddy Yankee	
September 13	Talento de Barrio	Daddy Yankee	
September 20	Talento de Barrio	Daddy Yankee	
September 27	The Royalty: La Realeza	R.K.M & Ken-Y	
October 4	The Royalty: La Realeza	R.K.M & Ken-Y	
October 11	The Royalty: La Realeza	R.K.M & Ken-Y	
October 18	The Royalty: La Realeza	R.K.M & Ken-Y	
October 25	The Royalty: La Realeza	R.K.M & Ken-Y	
November 1	Talento de Barrio	Daddy Yankee	
November 8	Los de Atrás Vienen Conmigo	Calle 13	
November 15	Juicio Final	Héctor el Father	
November 22	Talento de Barrio	Daddy Yankee	
November 29	Wisin & Yandel Presentan: La Mente Maestra	Wisin & Yandel	
December 6	Wisin & Yandel Presentan: La Mente Maestra	Wisin & Yandel	
December 13	Wisin & Yandel Presentan: La Mente Maestra	Wisin & Yandel	
December 20	Wisin & Yandel Presentan: La Mente Maestra	Wisin & Yandel	
December 27	Wisin & Yandel Presentan: La Mente Maestra	Wisin & Yandel	
