= Caribbean Connection =

Compilation album by various artists
- Released: June 24, 2008
- Recorded: 2006–2008
- Genre: Reggaeton, dancehall
- Length: 58:28
- Label: Machete Music

Professional ratings
Review scores
Source	Rating
AllMusic	link

Caribbean Connection is a compilation album by various dancehall and reggaeton artists, presented by Machete Music. It was released on 24 June 2008.

== Track listing ==
#	Title	Performers	Length
1	"Intro"	Elephant Man, Vico C, Julio Voltio, Zion & Lennox, Bounty Killer, Wisin, Don Omar, Daddy Yankee, Hector "El Father", Arcangel, Hyde, Franco "El Gorila", Beenie Man, Gocho, Ce'Cile & Jean	4:07
2	"Controlando el Area"	Daddy Yankee & Bounty Killer	3:34
3	"Fly Away"	Don Omar & Inner Circle	4:52
4	"Pegao (Remix)"	Wisin & Yandel & Elephant Man	3:54
5	"Don't Turn Off The Light"	Barrington Levy & Varon	4:01
6	"Movimiento Reptil"	Arcángel & De La Ghetto & Mr. Easy	3:12
7	"Don't Stay Away from the Sunshine"	Turbulence & Julio Voltio	3:52
8	"OG"	T.O.K. & Vico C	4:37
9	"Latinas"	Zion & Lennox & Elephant Man	2:43
10	"Caribeña"	Gocho & Notch	3:11
11	"Dance"	Angel & Khriz & Wayne Wonder	4:16
12	"Up In The Club"	Hector El Father & Ce'Cile	4:23
13	"Black or White"	Eddie Dee & Sasha	4:17
14	"Millenium Anthem"	Franco "El Gorila" & Sanchez	3:48
15	"I Still Be Loving You"	Yaga & Mackie & Sizzla	4:02

== Charts ==
Chart (2008)	Peak
US Latin Albums (Billboard)	17
US Tropical Songs (Billboard)	3
