= La Popola =

Single by Glory

from the album Glory
- Released: 19 March 2005
- Recorded: 2004
- Genre: Reggaeton, merengue
- Length: 3:13
- Label: Machete Music
- Songwriter: Glorimar Montalvo
- Producer: Eliel

Glory singles chronology
"La Gata Suelta" (2003)	"La Popola" (2005)	"La Traicionera" (2004)

"La Popola" is a song by Puerto Rican reggaetón recording artist Glory, from her debut studio album, Glou (2005). It was composed by Glory, produced by Eliel and released as the album's lead single. The song originally appeared on Eliel's El Que Habla Con Las Manos in 2004. It was banned in the Dominican Republic for its vulgar lyrical content.

== Background ==
Before venturing as a solo artist, Glory appeared on several songs by artists including Daddy Yankee, Don Omar, Héctor & Tito and Eddie Dee. She appeared on Yankee's successful "Gasolina", delivering the hook "dame más gasolina", and Omar's "Dale Don Dale" with the hook "suelta como gabete".

== Composition and controversy ==
Glory "La Popola" (2004)
An 18-second sample of Glory's "La Popola", which musically combines merengue and reggaeton.

In the Dominican Republic, the song was banned by the countries' Comisión Nacional de Espectáculos Públicos y Radiofonía, (National Commission of Public Entertainment) in late 2004, due to its vulgar lyrical content. It has also been banned in several Latin American countries for its exceedingly sexual lyrics. The term "popola" is used to refer to the watermelon fruit as well as the female sex organ. It was considered disrespectful to women. The song's musical aesthetics lean heavily toward the Dominican musical genre of merengue. Musically, it features major key tonality, mixed acoustic and electric instrumentation, an accordion playing and prominent percussion according to the Music Genome Project.

== Reception and cover versions ==
While reviewing Eliel's El Que Habla Con Las Manos, AllMusic's Evan Gutierrez stated that "La Popola" was one of the album's only highlights along with Don Omar's "Ronca". He continued by stating that "the other 19 tracks tend to run together into a nondescript, formulaic mishmash." It was covered by Reggaetones in 2006 on their second studio album, Fury of Reggaeton Hits. Yahari also performed a cover of the song on his 2005 album Las + Bailables de...Yahari. The song has appeared on several other compilation albums including Reggaeton Hitmakers 2000/2005: The Video (2005), Album of the Year: Las Mas Bailables (2006), Machete World Remixes, Part 1 (2006), and 2007's VI Music 30 Video Collection. A karaoke version of the song was released as a single on 19 March 2013 by Ameritz Spanish Karaoke.

== Charts ==
The song was released as the album's lead single on 19 March 2005 by Machete Music. It received barely sufficient airplay in Puerto Rico and none in the Dominican Republic. On the Billboard Tropical Songs chart, "La Popola" debuted at number 26 for the week of 26 March 2005. Ten weeks later, the song peaked at number ten for the week of 28 May 2005. In Billboard magazine, the song is credited to Eliel instead of Glory as the performer.

Chart (2005)	Peak Position
US Tropical Songs (Billboard)	10
