= Sin Límite =

Sin Límite may refer to:

- Sin Límite (Ednita Nazario album), 2001
- Sin Límite (Magnate & Valentino album), 2004
