= Progresivo =

Studio album by Magnate
- Released: June 19, 2007
- Genre: Reggaeton
- Label: Machete Music/VI Music
- Producers: Mambo Kingz; Álex Gárgolas; Doble A & Nales; Eliel; Miki "La Mano Bionica"

Magnate chronology
| Before & After (2006) | Progresivo (2007) | Quimica Perfecta (2009) |

Progresivo (Progressive) is the debut solo album by Magnate released on June 19, 2007. The solo release was when he was an active part of the duo Magnate & Valentino established in 1998 lasting until 2013.

== Track listing ==
| # | Title | Producer(s) | Length |
|---|---|---|---|
| 1 | Intro 'Progresivo' | Eliel | 1:00 |
| 2 | Nuestro Amor Es Así | Mambo Kingz | 2:57 |
| 3 | Amar Es (feat. Arcángel) | Fade | 3:43 |
| 4 | Cómo Hacer | Mambo Kingz | 3:57 |
| 5 | Un Día Más | Eliel | 3:58 |
| 6 | Por Ti | Jose Gomez | 3:53 |
| 7 | Me Pones Mal | Eliel | 3:21 |
| 8 | Un Juego | Miguel Torres, Eliel | 3:33 |
| 9 | Eh Verdá | Eliel | 3:17 |
| 10 | Stand By | Mambo Kingz | 3:39 |
| 11 | Candela | Doble A & Nales | 3:24 |
| 12 | Muñequita | Mambo Kingz | 3:09 |
| 13 | Nena Linda | Mambo Kingz | 3:17 |

== Chart performance ==
| Chart (2007) | Peak position |
|---|---|
| U.S. Billboard Latin Rhythm Albums | 18 |
