= Gold Star Music: Reggaeton Hits =

Compilation album by Héctor el Father
- Released: December 20, 2005
- Recorded: 2004–2005
- Genre: Reggaeton; hip hop
- Label: Gold Star; Universal Latino
- Producer: Luny Tunes; Nely "El Arma Secreta"; Nesty; Tainy; Naldo; Notty; Mekka; DJ Joe; DJ Fat; Monserrate & DJ Urba

Héctor el Father chronology
Sangre Nueva (2005)	Gold Star Music: Reggaeton Hits (2005)	Los Rompe Discotekas (2005)

Gold Star Music: Reggaeton Hits is a compilation album released in 2005 by reggaeton artist Héctor el Father, which contains the greatest hits from previous compilations released under Gold Star Music, label of Hector. The album features guest appearances from Polaco, Yomo, Kartier, Daddy Yankee, Don Omar, Zion, Wisin & Yandel, among others.

== Track listing ==
1. "La Envidia" – Héctor el Father and Polaco
2. "Que Se Sienta" – Héctor el Father and Yomo
3. "Si Te Vas (remix)" – Kartier and Zion
4. "No Hay Nadie" – Héctor el Father, Yomo, and Victor Manuelle
5. "Los Cojo Bajando" – Héctor el Father, Yomo, and Polaco
6. "La Que Noquea" – Héctor el Father and Ariel
7. "Vacía" – Kartier
8. "Aprieta" – Franco "El Gorila" and Wisin
9. "Déjale Caer To' El Peso" – Héctor el Father and Yomo
10. "Noche de Travesura" – Héctor el Father and Divino
11. "Salvaje" – Don Omar
12. "Machete" – Daddy Yankee
13. "Tú Quieres Duro" – Héctor el Father
14. "Mirándonos" – Héctor el Father and Zion
15. "No Le Temas a Él" – Trebol Clan, Héctor & Tito
16. "Gata Michu Michu" – Alexis & Fido
17. "Vamos Pa' La Calle" – Héctor el Father
18. "Gata Fiera" – Trebol Clan, Héctor el Father, and Joan
19. "Sácala" – Héctor el Father, Don Omar, Wisin & Yandel
20. "Uaa, Uaa" – Ariel "El Puro"
21. "Amor Prohibido" – Trebol Clan
22. "Bailando Sola" – Kartier

== Chart performance ==
Chart (2005–06)	Peak position
U.S. Billboard 200	188
U.S. Billboard Latin Rhythm Albums	3
U.S. Billboard Top Latin Albums	5
