= El Que Habla Con Las Manos =

2004 compilation album by Various Artists

Compilation album by Various Artists
- Released: November 9, 2004
- Recorded: 2004
- Genre: Reggaeton
- Label: VI
- Producer: Eliel

Various Artists chronology
El Que Habla Con Las Manos (2004)	Greatest Beats (2006)

El Que Habla Con Las Manos is a reggaeton compilation album made by various artists. It was released November 9, 2004 on VI Music. Puerto Rican hit maker Eliel produced this album.

== Track listing ==
1. "Ronca" - Don Omar, Héctor el Father, & Zion
2. "Vamos A Matarnos En La Raya" - Héctor el Father
3. "Cae La Noche" - Don Omar
4. "La Demoledora" - Polaco
5. "Lo Prohibido" - Valentino
6. "Duelo" - Tito "El Bambino"
7. "Sólo Una Noche" - Zion
8. "Tranquila Chiquilla" - Magnate
9. "Te Quiero A Ti" - Jomar
10. "Agitalas" - Wibal & Alex
11. "La Popola" - Glory
12. "Hoy Nena Quiero" - Baby Ranks
13. "Bandolera" - Joan & O'Neill
14. "Si Tú No Estás" - Marvin
15. "Ronca (Bounce Remix)" - Don Omar, Héctor el Father, & Zion
16. "Duele" - Héctor & Tito
17. "De Niña A Mujer" - Héctor el Father & Don Omar
18. "Tú Al Igual Que Yo" - Magnate & Valentino
19. "Te Vas" - Divino
20. "Te Hago El Amor" - Zion & Lennox
21. "Luna" - Don Omar

== Charts ==
Chart (2005)	Peak position
US Billboard 200	150
US Top Latin Albums (Billboard)	3

== Sales and certifications ==
Region	Certification	Certified units/sales
United States (RIAA)	Platinum (Latin)	100,000^{^}
^{^} Shipments figures based on certification alone.
