= Sola (Héctor el Father song) =

Single by Héctor el Father

from the album The Bad Boy
- Released: November 21, 2006
- Genre: Reggaeton
- Length: 2:53
- Label: VI; Machete; Gold Star
- Songwriters: Gabriel Antonio Cruz-Padilla; Hector Delgado

Héctor el Father singles chronology
"Noche de Entierro" (2006)	"Sola" (2006)	"Pa' La Tumba" (2007)

"Sola" (transl. "Alone") is a song by former Puerto Rican rapper Héctor el Father taken from his first solo album The Bad Boy (2006). It was released alongside the album as its lead single on November 21, 2006 by VI Music, Machete Music and Gold Star Music. It is Héctor el Father's most successful single to date, reaching number one on the Billboard Hot Latin Songs chart and being nominated for various music awards. The song was later included on the track lists of the compilation albums El Rompe Discoteka: The Mix Album (2007) and The Bad Boy: The Most Wanted Edition (2007). The song was also included on the live album Bad Boy: The Concert (2007).

== Charts ==
Chart (2006)	Peak position
US Hot Latin Songs (Billboard)	1
US Latin Rhythm Airplay (Billboard)	1

== Awards and nominations ==
Year	Ceremony	Award	Result
2008	Premio Lo Nuestro	Urban Song of the Year	Nominated
2008	Billboard Latin Music Awards	Reggaeton Song of the Year	Nominated

== See also ==
- List of Billboard Latin Rhythm Airplay number ones of 2007
