= Season Finale (Héctor & Tito album) =

Compilation album by Héctor & Tito
- Released: August 16, 2005; November 11, 2006 (The Gold Series)
- Genre: Reggaeton
- Language: Spanish
- Labels: Machete; VI

Héctor & Tito chronology
A la Reconquista (2002)	Season Finale (2005)	The Ultimate Urban Collection (2007)

Season Finale 1998 - 2003, also known as Season Finale, is a compilation album by Héctor & Tito released in 2005 by Machete Music and VI Music. In 2006, The Gold Series edition was released as part of a series of albums having re-released edition under this series done by many artist. This album contains tracks from their previous albums and albums from producers or DJs of the Reggaeton genre. This was also the first album since their separation the year prior. Based on the name it was most likely a farewell album for the fans and to indicate that this was the end of the duo. Although in 2007, they did release another compilation album titled "The Ultimate Urban Collection".

== Track listing ==
Disk 1 (CD)
No.	Title	From The Album	Length
1.	"Si Estoy Fácil"	Grayskull	3:19
2.	"Pégate"	The Flow	2:15
3.	"Guata Gatas"	Guatauba	3:55
4.	"A Que No Te Atreves" (only Tito El Bambino)	Gárgolas IV	2:03
5.	"Felina"	A la Reconquista	3:37
6.	"Tú y Yo"	Gárgolas IV	2:45
7.	"Duelo" (only Tito El Bambino)	Eliel	3:53
8.	"Vamos a Matarnos en la Raya"	Eliel	3:20
9.	"Baila Morena (Live)"	A La Reconquista Live	3:06
10.	"Gata Celosa (Live)"	A La Reconquista Live	3:32
11.	"Yo Te Buscaba (Live)"	A La Reconquista Live	4:54
12.	"Báilame" (only Tito El Bambino)	Plagas II	1:51
13.	"Ellos Tiran"	Plagas I	2:54
14.	"Por Eso Ando Yo Solo"	Plagas II	2:38
15.	"Acabando"	Gárgolas II	2:43
Total length:			47:12

Disk 2 (DVD)
No.	Title	Length
1.	"Ay Amor"	4:42
2.	"Yo Te Buscaba / Duele"	4:28
3.	"Morena"	4:43
4.	"Felina"	3:38
5.	"Gata Celosa"	3:58
6.	"Video Mix"	7:54
Total length:		29:23

The Gold Series
No.	Title	From The Album	Length
1.	"Pégate"	The Flow	2:15
2.	"Guata Gatas"	Guatauba	3:55
3.	"Felina"	A la Reconquista	3:37
4.	"Tú y Yo"	Gárgolas IV	2:45
5.	"Duelo" (only Tito El Bambino)	Eliel	3:53
6.	"Vamos a Matarnos en la Raya"	Eliel	3:20
7.	"Baila Morena (Live)"	A La Reconquista Live	3:06
8.	"Gata Celosa (Live)"	A La Reconquista Live	3:32
9.	"Yo Te Buscaba (Live)"	A La Reconquista Live	4:54
10.	"Báilame" (only Tito El Bambino)	Plagas II	1:51
11.	"Por Eso Ando Yo Solo"	Plagas II	2:38
12.	"Acabando"	Gárgolas II	2:43
13.	"En una Disco"	A La Reconquista	3:06
Total length:			42:12

== Charts ==
Chart (2005)	Peak position
US Top Latin Albums (Billboard)	57
