= Rompiendo el Hielo =

2002 studio album by Magnate y Valentino

Rompiendo El Hielo

Studio album by Magnate y Valentino
- Released: June 17, 2002
- Genre: Reggaeton
- Label: VI Music
- Producer: Eliel

Magnate y Valentino chronology
Rompiendo El Hielo (2002)	Sin Límite (2004)

Rompiendo el Hielo (Breaking the Ice) is the 2002 debut album by reggaeton duo Magnate y Valentino.

== Track listing ==
1. Intro
2. Como Es Que Tú Te Vas
3. Quiero Que Hagas Mujer (feat. Nicky Jam)
4. Yal
5. Gata Celosa (feat. Héctor y Tito)
6. Ven Conmigo (Magnate solo)
7. Dime Donde (Valentino solo)
8. Bala Contra Bala
9. Anda
10. Tú Al Igual Que Yo
11. Así Es la Vida (Magnate solo)
12. Te Buscaré (Magnate solo)

== Charts ==
Chart (2002)	Peak position
US Top Latin Albums (Billboard)	48
US Latin Pop Albums (Billboard)	14
