= Noztra =

Dominican rapper

- Born: Martin Rivera; October 20, 1983 (age 42); San Francisco de Macorís, Dominican Republic
- Genres: Reggaeton; electropop; Latin hip hop
- Occupations: Rapper
- Instrument: Vocals
- Years active: 2003–present
- Label: Talento Uno Music

Martin Rivera (born October 20, 1983), better known as Noztra, is a Dominican rapper. Born in San Francisco de Macorís, Dominican Republic, his family moved to New York City looking for work when he was seven. At the age of 16, Noztra began composing his own lyrics and music.

== Biography ==
In June 2005, Martin Rivera better known as Noztra made history by being the first Dominican Reggaeton artist in the United States to be signed to a major record label; Universal Records’ Machete Music. This offered him the ideal platform to expand his brand and be able to open up for artists like Daddy Yankee, Nicky Jam, Tego Calderon, Don Omar, Wisin & Yandel, Ivy Queen, Zion & Lennox and Hector El Father among others.

Noztra has performed in three Megatons (Houston, NY, LA), Vivaton 2006, Reggaeton Explocion 2 (San Francisco & LA) and at 105.9 FM La Kalle’s Block Party at New York City’s Madison Square Garden.

After two successful mixtapes; Conteo Regresivo 1 & 2, Noztra released his first full-length 19-track album entitled “Ya’ Ain’t Ready.” The album was produced by Luny Tunes, Nesty, Monserrate & DJ Urba, Notty-Mekka, DJ Sonic, Myztiko and A&X. The album covered many different sound experimentations including sandungueo, bolero, hip hop and malianteo. His videos off of the album received solid airplay on television networks like MTV en Español, Mun2, HTV, Mas Musica and many others.

The release of his album did not stop Noztra from advancing his career. He also appeared on a slew of compilation albums including Sangre Nueva, El Draft 2005 and Da Fuxion: Mas Que Perreo to name a few.

After his musical career, Noztra took a hiatus and focused on business and personal life. He later resumed his music activities. His new release “La Funda” has been broadcast on radio stations in the Dominican Republic and other locations.

== History ==
In 2002 he conducted one of the first reggaeton radio shows to air in New York City. Shortly after, Noztra opened shows that featured reggaeton stars.

Noztra entered the scene with his single "Damelo Duro", which was distributed on mixtapes and had great success on radio. His first album, Ya’ Aint Ready, contains 19 tracks and a variety of sounds such as Sandungueo, Bolero, Streets/Gangsta hip hop and social themes. The first single off this album is "El Maquinon", and was produced by Monserrate & DJ Urba. It peaked at number 31 on the Billboard Latin Tropical Airplay chart.

Noztra was the first reggaeton artist to sign with a major label.

== Discography ==
=== Albums ===
- Ya' Aint Ready (2005)

=== Mixtapes ===
- Conteo Regresivo Vol. 1 (2005)
- Conteo Regresivo Vol. 2 (2006)

=== Compilation appearances ===
- Sangre Nueva (2005)
- The Draft (2005)
- The Fuxion: Mas Que Perreo (2005)
- Los Dueños del Flow (2006)
