= Ahora le Toca al Cangri! Live =

Live album by Daddy Yankee
- Released: March 15, 2005
- Recorded: August 2003; Roberto Clemente Coliseum (San Juan, Puerto Rico)
- Genre: Latin
- Label: VI Music

Daddy Yankee chronology
Barrio Fino (2004)	Ahora le Toca al Cangri! Live (2005)	Barrio Fino en Directo (2005)

Ahora le Toca al Cangri! Live is a live album of the greatest hits by Daddy Yankee released on March 15, 2005 on VI Music. Its songs are based on tracks released before his worldwide hit, Barrio Fino (2004).

== Track listing ==
No.	Title	Length
1.	"Seguroski"	3:56
2.	"Latigazo"	3:08
3.	"Muévete y Perrea"	3:56
4.	"Yo No Creo En Socios" (Studio Track Included: Las Guanabanas)	4:14
5.	"Tú Eres Mi Baby" (featuring Glory) (Studio Track Included: Nicky Jam)	4:09
6.	"Maulla" (featuring Yaga & Mackie)	3:39
7.	"Se Acelera el Flow" (featuring Yaviah, Mr. Notty)	3:39
8.	"Puerto Rico Te la Dedico" (featuring Yaviah, Mr. Notty)	3:19
9.	"Brugal"	3:26
10.	"Enciende"	4:31
11.	"Sigo Algare"	3:08
12.	"30/30" (Studio Track Included: Nas)	3:41
13.	"Gata Gangsters" (featuring Don Omar)	4:04
14.	"Party De Gangsters"	2:35
15.	"Dale Hasta Abajo"	3:46
16.	"Medley Oh Ah"	4:48
17.	"Seguroski (Remix)"	3:25

== Charts ==
Chart (2005)	Peak Position
US Billboard 200	104
US Latin Albums (Billboard)	3
US Latin Rhythm Albums (Billboard)	8
US Tropical Albums (Billboard)	3
US Reggae Albums (Billboard)	2
