= Censurado =

Studio album by Ranking Stone
- Released: September 30, 2003
- Recorded: 2002–2003
- Genre: Reggaeton
- Length: 51:00
- Label: VI Music
- Producer: DJ Blass, DJ Fat, DJ Joe, DJ Nelson & Noriega

Ranking Stone chronology
Different Styles (1995)	Censurado (2003)	Al Rescate (2006)

Singles from Censurado
- 1. "Quiero Hacertelo" Released: 2003; 2. "Baila Conmigo" Released: 2003; 3. "Dale Mai" Released: 2003

Censurado is an album by Ranking Stone. It peaked at number 4 on the Billboard Tropical Albums chart and number 36 on the Billboard Top Latin Albums chart.

== Track listing ==
1. "Intro"
2. "Cuando"
3. "Dale Mai" (featuring Cheka)
4. "Quiero Hacertelo"
5. "Castigo" (featuring Glory)
6. "Gata Soltera"
7. "Baila Conmigo" (featuring Trebol Clan)
8. "Nena"
9. "Tu Estas Bailando" (featuring Zion & Lennox)
10. "Hot Dog"
11. "Muevete Lady" (featuring Noriega)
12. "Al Verte Mujer"
13. "Tu Cuerpo Me Descontrola" (Trebol Clan song)
14. "El Detalle"
15. "Al Verte Mujer" (Merengue Remix)
16. "Voy Pa' Alla"
17. "Monosucesos"
