= Varona =

Varona or de Varona is a surname. It may be a surname of Spanish origin associated with the noble Varona family or the Belarusian spelling of the Russian surname Vorona. Notable people with the surname include:

- Dante Varona (born 1953), former Filipino actor and film director
- Donna de Varona (born 1947), American swimmer
- Dora Varona (1932–2018), Cuban-Peruvian writer and missionary
- Enrique José Varona (1849–1933), Cuban writer
- Larysa Varona (born 1983), Belarusian cross-country skier
- Manuel Antonio de Varona, a.k.a. Tony Varona (1908–1992), Cuban lawyer and politician
- Oscar Varona Varona (born 1949), Cuban basketball player
- Ruben Varona (born 1980), Colombian poet and writer
- Ronie Von Varona (born 1994), Filipino archivist and librarian
- Bernabé Varona (1845–1873), Cuban army general

== See also ==
- Varon
