= Los Compadres: La Perfecta Ocasión =

Los Compadres full title Los Compadres: La Perfecta Ocasión was a collective album by Los Compadres made up of three musical stars of Puerto Rico, Valentino (of the duo Magnate & Valentino and Mario VI and Gocho released on December 5, 2006.

== Track list ==
1. "Tu Tiguere" (Valentino, Gocho & Mario VI (3:40)
2. "Dale Mas Bass" (Valentino) (3:27)
3. "Tu Primera Vez" (Mario VI) (2:59)
4. "La Perfecta Ocasión" (Valentino, Gocho & Mario VI (3:15)
5. "Tu Vicio" (Valentino) (4:38)
6. "Dos Amantes, Dos Amigos" (Mario VI) (2:50)
7. "Tu Quieres" (Valentino) (4:11)
8. "Si Ella Pide" (Valentino, Gocho & Mario VI (3:51)
9. "Corazón Salvaje" (Mario VI) (3:36)
10. "Es Asi" (Valentino, Gocho & Mario VI (4:05)
11. "Se Nos Acaba el Tiempo" (Mario VI & Gocho) (3:25)

== Sources ==
- iTunes: Los Compadres - La Perfecta Ocasión - Gocho, Mario VI & Valentino
