= Golpe de Estado =

Golpe De Estado

Compilation album by various artists
- Released: January 12, 2010
- Recorded: 2009
- Genre: Reggaetón, Bachata, Latin pop
- Length: 48:16
- Language: Spanish
- Label: Machete Music, V. I. Records
- Producer: Luny Tunes, Noriega, Predikador, DJ Nelson, Eliel, Monserrate & DJ Urba, Los Metalicos, EZP, Pedro Polanco, Yazid Rivera, Gabriel Rodríguez

Singles from Golpe De Estado
- 1. "Como Tu Me Tocas" Released: October 26, 2009; 2. "La Velita" Released: November 3, 2009

Golpe De Estado is a compilation album by various artists published by the Machete Music label. It was released on January 12, 2010. The album contains tracks by reggaeton artists Arcángel, Ivy Queen, Zion & Lennox, Héctor el Father, among others. The album managed to debut and peak at number 12 on the Billboard Latin Rhythm Albums chart. It spawned two singles "Como Tu Me Tocas" performed by Arcángel, and "La Velita" performed by Arcángel, Ivy Queen, Zion and Jadiel. The singles, however, were not as successful, and thus failed to obtain chart success.

== Background ==
Golpe De Estado includes songs by some of "Reggaeton's biggest stars" such as Ivy Queen, Arcángel, Zion & Lennox, Héctor "El Father", Cosculluela, Yomo and many more. The lead single "Como Tu Me Tocas" by Arcángel was released on October 29, 2009. The second single "La Velita" by Arcángel, Ivy Queen, Zion and Jadiel was released on November 3, 2009. "El Recuerdo", a bachata track is performed by Ivy Queen. Other artist including Tito El Bambino were originally to be included on the album.

== Musical composition ==
"El Recuerdo", a bachata track is performed by Ivy Queen. Hector "El Father" performed "Ven Donde Mí", a romantic reggaeton song.

== Track listing ==
- Standard Edition

No.	Title	Writer(s)	Performing Artist(s)	Length
1.	"La Velita"	Joel Baez, Ramon Gonzalez, Eliel Lind, Felix "Zion" Ortiz, Martha Pesante, Austín Santos	Arcángel, Ivy Queen, Zion, Jadiel	4:21
2.	"Tengo Que Decir"	Robert Martinez Lebron, Felix "Zion" Ortiz, Gabriel Pizarro, Waldemar Sabad	Zion & Lennox	4:31
3.	"El Recuerdo"	Robert Martinez Lebron, Edwin Z. Perez, Martha Pesante, Pedro Polanco	Ivy Queen	3:30
4.	"Como Tu Me Tocas"	Urbani Mota Cedeño, Austín Santos	Arcángel	3:52
5.	"Click Clack"	José Cosculluela, Paul Irizarry, George M. Ladkani, Robert Martinez Lebron	Cosculluela	3:45
6.	"Lio"	Robert Martinez Lebron, Waldemar Sabad, Jose Torres	Yomo	3:09
7.	"Ven Donde Mí"	Robert Martinez Lebron, Juan Santana	Héctor "El Father"	3:04
8.	"Me Pones Mal"	Maidel Amador Canales, Robert Martinez Lebron, Juan Santana	La Sista	3:42
9.	"Qué Pasó"	Carlos Crespo, Robert Martinez Lebron, Luis Torres	Ñejo	3:08
10.	"Mi Corazón"	Luis Eloy Hernandez, Luis Hernández, Robert Martinez Lebron, Waldemar Sabad	Eloy	3:29
11.	"Mi Gente De Case"	Carlos Morales, Rafael Del Rosario	Consilieri	4:10
12.	"Hay Algo En Ti"	Ariel Harrigan, Freddy Melendez, Yazid Rivera, Gabriel Rodríguez	Freddy Melendez	3:52
13.	"No Hay Limites"	Sergio Bustamante	Junior B	3:52
Total length:				48:16

== Credits and personnel ==
Adapted from Allmusic

- Austín Santos "Arcángel" – Primary Artist, Composer
- Joel Baez – Composer
- Sergio Bustamante – Composer
- Urbani Mota Cedeño – Composer, Producer
- Cosculluela – Primary Artist, Composer
- Jose Cotto – Mixing
- Carlos Crespo – Composer
- Luis Eloy Hernández "Eloy" – Primary Artist, Composer
- Ariel Harrigan – Composer
- Héctor "El Father" – Primary Artist, Composer, Producer
- Paul Irizarry – Composer
- Martha Pesante "Ivy Queen" – Primary Artist, Composer
- Ramon Gonazalez "Jadiel" – Featured Artist, Composer
- George M. Ladkani – Composer
- Robert Martinez Lebron "Lennox" – Primary Artist; Composer
- Eliel Lind – Composer, Producer
- Los Metalicos – Producer
- Freddy Melendez – Primary Artist, Composer
- Carlos Morales – Composer
- Ñejo – Primary Artist
- Felix Ortiz "Zion" – Primary Artist, Composer
- Edwin Z. Perez "EZP" – Composer, Producer
- Esteban Piñero – Mastering, Mixing, Arranging
- Gabriel Pizarro – Composer
- Pedro Polanco – Composer, Producer
- Giovany Reyes – Mixing
- Yazid Rivera – Composer, Producer
- Gabriel Rodríguez – Composer, Producer
- Rafael Del Rosario – Composer
- Waldemar Sabad – Composer
- Francisco Saldaña – Producer
- Juan Santana – Composer
- Luny Tunes – Producer
- Yomo – Primary Artist

== Charts ==
Chart (2010)	Peak position
US Latin Rhythm Albums (Billboard)	12
