= Los Dueños del Flow =

Compilation album by Noztra
- Released: February 28, 2006
- Genre: Reggaeton
- Producer: Luny Tunes; Mambo Kingz; Rafy Mercenario; Noriega; Phynyx; Clasico; Casper

Noztra chronology
Ya’ Aint Ready (2005)	Los Dueños del Flow (2006)	A Mi Manera (2008)

Los Dueños del Flow is a compilation album by various artists presented by Noztra.

== Track listing ==
1. "Intro - Noztra
2. "Ella - Karthier
3. "Cuando - Yaga & Mackie
4. "Bombea - Tommy Viera
5. "Digan Lo Que Digan - Ivy Queen
6. "Ven - Kenny & Eric
7. "Cojanlo Easy - Kastro
8. "Toing - Ranking Stone
9. "Activeara - Casper Y Fen-X
10. "Lo Que Nos Gusta - Johnny Perez
11. "Fuego - Flaco & Rada
12. "Dogs, The - Los Perros - (featuring Tommy Viera)
13. "Que Suenen Pistolas - Moreno
14. "Ponte Bruto - Mexicano 777
15. "Tiempo - Don Omar
