= Lágrimas De Sangre =

Studio album by Naldo
- Released: April 28, 2009
- Recorded: 2008–2009
- Genre: Rock, pop rock, reggaeton, hip hop
- Label: Sangre Nueva Music
- Producer: Naldo (Exec.), DJ Blass

Naldo chronology
Sangre Nueva (2005)	Lágrimas De Sangre (2009)	Sangre Nueva 2 (2011)

Singles from Lágrimas De Sangre
- 1. "Ya No Existen Detalles" Released: 2008; 2. "7 Mares" Released: 2009

Lágrimas De Sangre is the debut studio album by reggaeton producer and singer Naldo, released on April 28, 2009. The first single from the album is "Ya No Existen Detalles" featuring Jowell & Randy.

== Track listing ==
Official track list:

1. "Intro"
2. "Hoy"
3. "Ya No Existen Detalles" (feat. Jowell & Randy)
4. "7 Mares"
5. "De la Noche a la Mañana"
6. "No Sé Si Tú" (feat. De La Ghetto)
7. "¿Cómo Te Ha Ido?" (feat. Ivy Queen)
8. "Universitaria"
9. "Si Como Camina Cocina" (feat. Dálmata)
10. "Mínimo" (feat. Yomo
11. "Una Noche Más"
12. "Mal" (feat. Keesha)
13. "Otra Vez" (feat. LJ)
14. "No He Dormido Na"
15. "Te Sabe Igual"

=== Promotional songs ===
1. "Pa' Ti Estoy Ready" (feat. Alex The Greatest)
