= Imparables =

Studio album by Magnate y Valentino
- Released: June 18, 2013
- Genre: Reggaeton

Magnate y Valentino chronology
Quimica Perfecta (2009)	Imparables (2013)

Imparables (Unstoppable) is the last studio album of the duo Magnate & Valentino with the duo separating immediately after the release with each carrying their careers as solo artists.

== Track list ==
1. "Hasta El Amanecer" (3:35)
2. "A Media Luz" (feat. Lui-G 21 Plus) (3:52)
3. "Bésame La Boca" (3:20)
4. "Hagamos El Amor" (Nengo Flow) (4:33)
5. "Con Los 2 A Las Vez" (4:00)
6. "Sin Ti" (4:59)
7. "Revivir La Aventura" (feat. Jory Boy) (3:59)
8. "Instinto Animal" (4:13)
9. "El Remate" (3:44)
10. "Tu Recuerdo" (feat. Gotay El Autentiko) (2:53)
11. "El Party" (3:30)
12. "Regresa Ya" (feat. Yelsid) (3:51)
13. "Con Los 2 A La Vez" (Censured) (3:58)
