= La Historia Live =

2003 live album by Héctor & Tito

Live album by Héctor & Tito
- Released: May 20, 2003
- Recorded: October 4, 2002; Roberto Clemente Coliseum (San Juan, Puerto Rico)
- Genre: Reggaeton
- Label: VI

Héctor & Tito chronology
A la Reconquista (2002)	La Historia Live (2003)	Season Finale (2005)

La Historia Live is a live album by Héctor & Tito. Its physical version was released as a two disc album. The digital version has an outro that was not included on the CDs, meaning that it is a digital exclusive.

== Track listing ==
Disc: 1
No.	Title	Length
1.	"Intro / Si Estoy Fácil"	5:06
2.	"Dónde Están"	2:52
3.	"Guata Gatas / Improvisación"	4:35
4.	"Caminaré Por Mundo" (featuring Grupo Manía)	4:35
5.	"Que Será" (featuring La Secta AllStar)	7:50
6.	"Tra - Tra Mix"	1:50
7.	"Yo Te Buscaba"	4:54
8.	"Artificiales Gatilleros"	2:45
9.	"Gata Celosa" (featuring Magnate & Valentino)	3:31
10.	"Pégate" (Don Omar)	2:18
11.	"Noche de Loba" (featuring Víctor Manuelle)	11:05
12.	"Flores Pa' los Muertos"	5:06
13.	"Bandolera"	2:35
14.	"Yo Quiero Saber"	2:20
15.	"Tu Pueblo Es Mi Pueblo"	4:47
16.	"Gata Salvaje" (featuring Daddy Yankee & Nicky Jam)	2:36
17.	"Outro" (Digital Only)	0:29

Disc: 2
No.	Title	Length
1.	"Dale un Latigazo" (featuring Daddy Yankee & Nicky Jam)	3:21
2.	"En Una Disco" (only Tito El Bambino)	4:38
3.	"Homenaje a Vico C (Medley: Explosión/Bomba Para Afincar)"	3:51
4.	"Después Que Cae la Lluvia" (featuring Domingo Quiñones)	5:35
5.	"Te Estás Calentando" (featuring Don Omar Only)	1:40
6.	"Ven Suéltate" (featuring Don Omar Only)	1:20
7.	"Déjala" (featuring Don Omar Only)	1:56
8.	"Duele"	4:27
9.	"Mataron A Un Inocente"	3:05
10.	"Gatúbela"	5:37
11.	"Ay Amor" (Reggaeton) (Víctor Manuelle - New Song)	3:54
12.	"Morena" (Glory & Don Omar - New Song)	3:06
13.	"Amor De Colegio" (Don Omar - New Song)	3:07
14.	"Ay Amor" (Salsa) (Víctor Manuelle)	4:18
15.	"Morena" (Remix) (Glory & Don Omar)	2:38

== Personnel ==
- Keyboards - A. Eliel
- Composer - Alejandro Montalban
- Primary Artist - Alex Quiles
- Bongos - Anthony Carrillo
- Bateria - Bradly Mejias
- Guitar - Carlos Rolon
- Timbales - Charlie Sierra
- Composer - D.A.R.
- Primary Artist - Daddy Yankee
- Composer - DJ Nelson
- Composer, Primary Artist - Domingo Quinones
- Coros, Primary Artist - Don Omar
- Composer, Primary Artist - Eduardo Reyes
- Composer - Efrain Fines Nevares
- Composer - Efrain Nevarez
- Composer - Eliel
- Composer - Francisco Saldana
- Primary Artist - Glory
- Primary Artist - Grupo Mania
- Composer, Primary Artist - Hector & Trio
- Composer - Hector Delgado Roman
- Composer - Hector El Father
- Percussion - Javier Oquendo
- Trumpet - Juan Jose "Cheito" Quinonez
- Primary Artist - La Secta
- Primary Artist - La Secta Allstar
- Composer - Luis Angel Cruz
- Piano - Luis Marin
- Arranger - Luis Rafael Torres
- Composer, Primary Artist - Magnate & Valentino
- Primary Artist - Nicky Jam
- Composer, Musical Producer, Primary Artist - Norgie Noriega
- Composer - Noriega
- Coros - Norma
- Percussion - Paoli Mejias
- Bajo Sexto - Pedro Perez
- Trombone - Raffi Torres
- Composer - Ramon Oliveira Mustafa
- Bajo Sexto - Ricky Encarnacion
- Mastering, Mezcla - Ronnie Torres
- Congas - Sammy Torres
- Primary Artist - T.I.
- Coros - Tita
- Composer - Tito "El Bambino" El Patron
- Composer, Primary Artist - Tito & Hector
- Primary Artist - Valentino
- Primary Artist - Vico C
- Primary Artist - Victor Manuelle
- Composer - William Landron Rivera

== Charts ==
Chart (2003)	Peak position
US Top Latin Albums (Billboard)	4
US Latin Pop Albums (Billboard)	2
US Heatseekers Albums (Billboard)	15

== Sales and certifications ==
Region	Certification	Certified units/sales
United States (RIAA)	2× Platinum (Latin)	200,000^{^}
^{^} Shipments figures based on certification alone.
