= Ya' Aint Ready =

Ya' Ain't Ready

Studio album by Noztra
- Released: August 30, 2005
- Recorded: 2005
- Genre: Reggaeton
- Producers: Luny Tunes; Nesty "La Mente Maestra"; Monserrate & DJ Urba; DJ Sonic; Notty; Mekka; Myztiko; A & X

Noztra chronology
.	Ya' Ain't Ready (2005)	Los Dueños del Flow (2006)

Ya' Ain't Ready is the debut album by Noztra. The album contains a variety of sounds such as Sandungueo, Bolero, Streets/Gangsta Hip Hop and Social themes. All the tracks were written by Noztra and the album was produced by some of the top producers in the market such as: Luny Tunes, Nesty, DJ Urba, Monserrate, DJ Sonic, Notty-Mekka, Myztiko and A & X.

The first single off this album is "El Maquinon", which was produced by DJ Urba & Monserrate

== Track listing ==
1. "Intro (Ya Ain't Ready)"
2. "Bailar Reggaeton"
3. "La Disco Explota"
4. "El Maquinon"
5. "Cuentale" - (feat. Cheo)
6. "Dame Un Minuto"
7. "Dámelo Duro" - (featuring Rosandi)
8. "Te Haces La Difícil"
9. "Ammo Musik" - (feat. Calvo El Philarrican & Medizina)
10. "Me Huele A Guerra"
11. "La Matadora"
12. "La Perreta (Remix)"
13. "Te Quise Amar" - (feat. Erin V.)
14. "Me Desespera"
15. "Velocidad"
16. "Suelta La Lengua" - (feat. Calvo El Philarrican)
17. "La Disco Explota - (Merengue Remix)"
18. "La Hora De Joder " (feat. DD)
19. "Cuantos Años Pasaran"
