= Arcángel & De la Ghetto =

American duo

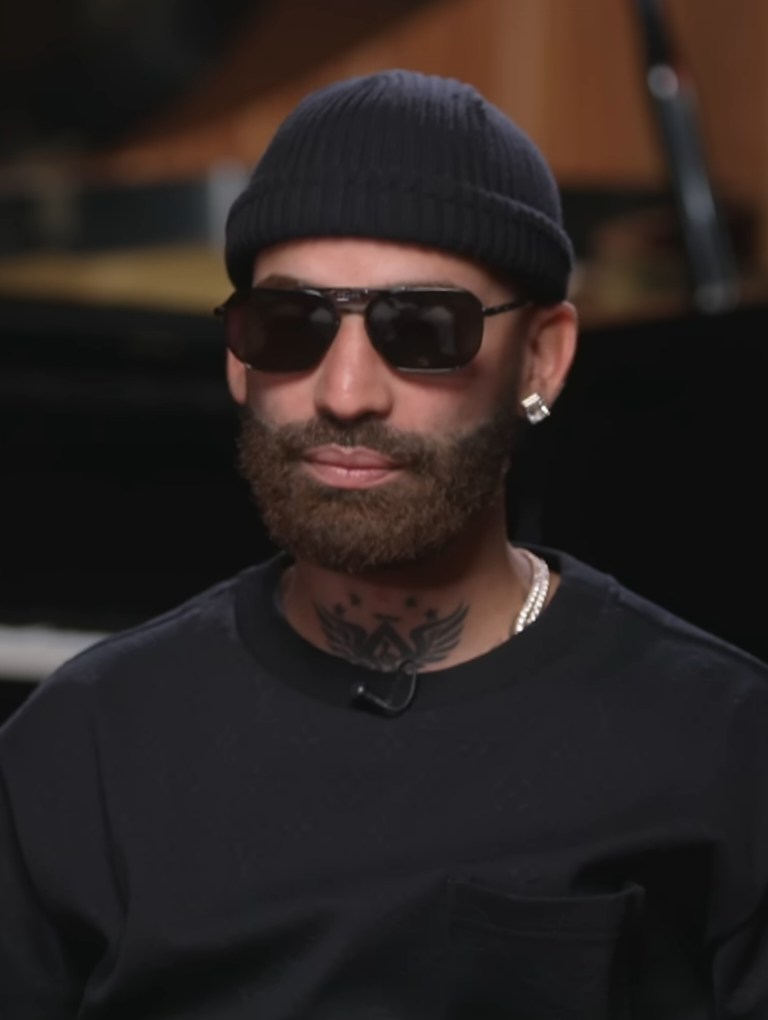
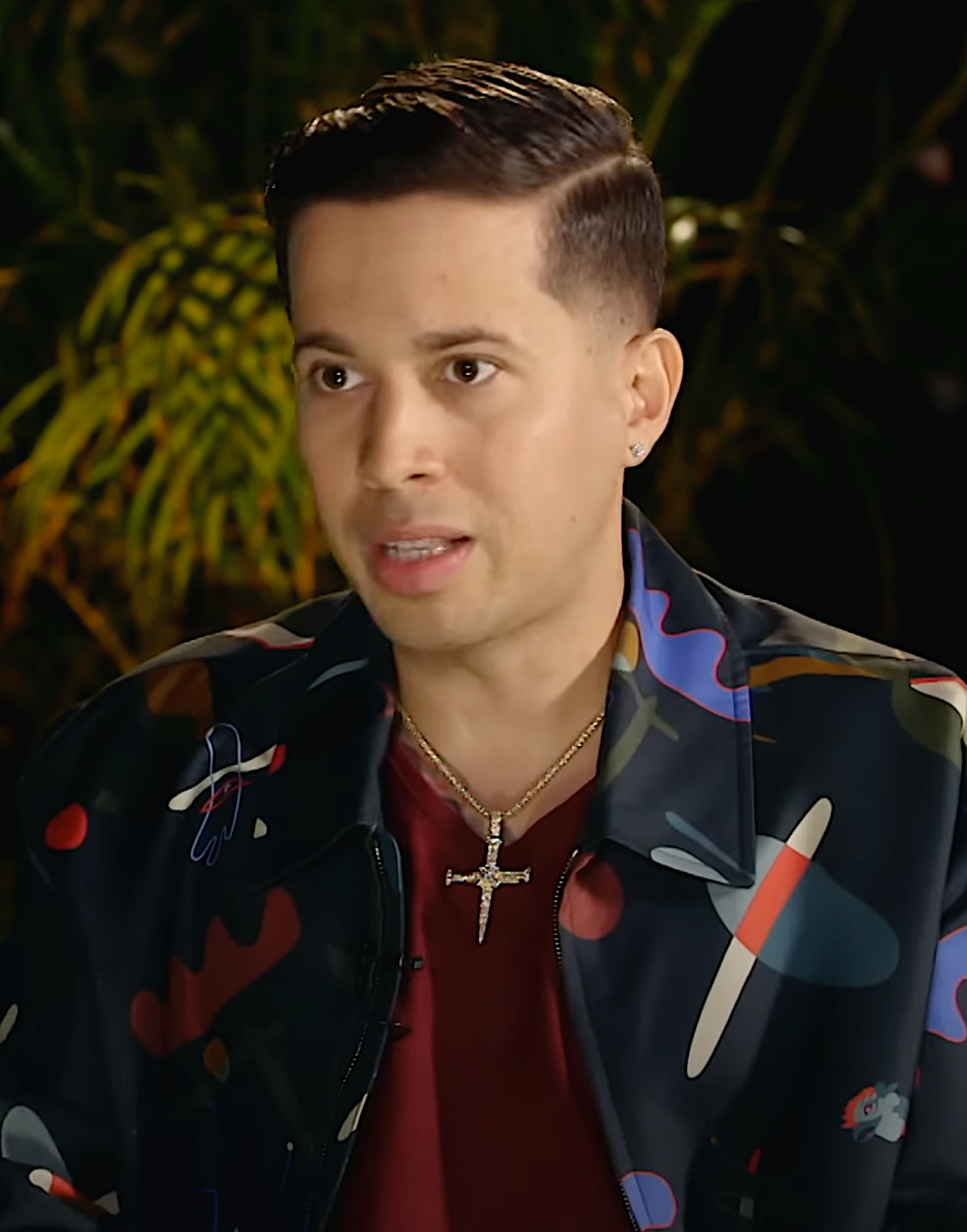
- Arcángel (left) and De la Ghetto (right)

Background information
- Origin: New York City, U.S.
- Genres: Reggaeton; hip hop; R&B; Latin trap
- Years active: 2004–2007
- Label: Baby
- Members: Austin Santos (Arcángel); Rafael Castillo (De la Ghetto)

Arcángel & De la Ghetto are an American reggaeton duo, consisting of Austin "Arcángel" Santos and Rafael "De la Ghetto" Castillo.

Arcángel and De la Ghetto duo began when they met in a studio in San Juan, Puerto Rico, and would be signed to Zion's label, Baby Records, in 2004. They debuted in 2005 with the duet single "Ven Pégate" on the reggaeton compilation Sangre Nueva, going on to feature in several more compilation albums and gaining worldwide fame through their singles "Mi Fanatica", "Sorpresa", and "Ella Quiere". However, due to Baby Records hesitating to release a record or album for the duo themselves, they decided to break up the duo in 2007 and pursue their talents as solo artists. After achieving greater fame as solo artists, Arcangel and De la Ghetto have since individually collaborated with one another on several occasions, as well as other artists such as J Balvin, Reykon, Yelsid, Zion, Daddy Yankee, Héctor el Father, Jowell & Randy, Don Omar, Tito El Bambino, Ivy Queen, Yaga & Mackie, Tego Calderón, Ñejo & Dalmata, Alexis & Fido, and Julio Voltio.

== Discography ==
=== Studio albums ===
- 2007: Las Nuevas Amenazas

=== Collaborative albums ===
- 2007: Flow Factory (with Zion)

=== Mixtapes ===
- 2006: La Factoría del Flow, Vol. 1 (with Zion)
- 2006: La Factoría del Flow, Vol. 2
- 2007: La Factoría del Flow, Vol. 3

=== Singles ===
- 2006: "Ella Quiere"
- 2007: "Sorpresa"
- 2007: "Aparentemente" (featuring Yaga & Mackie)
- 2013: "Flow Violento" (remix)
- 2013: "Sincero Amor" (remix)
- 2014: "Estamo' Aquí"
- 2016: "Me Enamoré de la Glock"
- 2016: "Rosé"
- 2017: "Más Que Ayer"
