= Dándole =

Single by Gocho featuring Jowell and Ivy Queen or Omega

from the album Mi Música
- Released: January 25, 2011
- Recorded: 2010–2011; Fajardo, Puerto Rico (New Era Destination Studios); Santo Domingo (Dominican Hit Factory)
- Genre: Merengue, urban
- Length: 4:00
- Label: Venevision, New Era Entertainment
- Songwriters: Jose Ángel Torres, David Castro, Joel Munoz, Leo Vazquez James, Mervin Maldonado
- Producers: Frank Jay, Gocho, Dexter & Mr. Greenz, Hyde, Live Music, Noriega

Gocho singles chronology
"Dándole" (2011)	"Si Te Digo La Verdad" (2012)

Audio sample
- A 24 second sample of "Dándole" featuring the chorus performed by Ivy Queen and Gocho and part of Jowell's first verse.: file; help

"Dándole" (English: Hitting It) is a song by Puerto Rican recording artist and record producer Gocho featuring Jowell from his debut studio album Mi Música (2011). Written and produced by a variety of composers and producers, the song was released as the lead single from the album on January 25, 2011. Two separate remixes were recorded and featured on the album after being released digitally with Ivy Queen and Omega respectively. A reggaetón version of the song is also available as the album's closing track. In the Latin market, the song was a commercial success peaking in the Top 10 of three charts in the United States while peaking at #8 in Venezuela. In total, the song performed on seven charts. It also received several awards within the Latin community.

== Background ==
Puerto Rican Latin urban music producer and composer Gocho has collaborated with Don Omar, Daddy Yankee, and Angel & Khriz among others and has produced mainstream hits such as "La Tortura" by Shakira featuring Alejandro Sanz. It was announced in 2010 that Gocho would release an album. He was signed to Venemusic in 2011 to release his debut solo album. Signed to a revenue-sharing deal, Gocho released his debut single from the album Mi Música in 2011 entitled "Dándole" featuring Jowell. The album stalled, however, and wasn't successful commercially. It did, however, spawn the #1 hit "Si Te Digo La Verdad", Gocho's second single.

== Composition ==
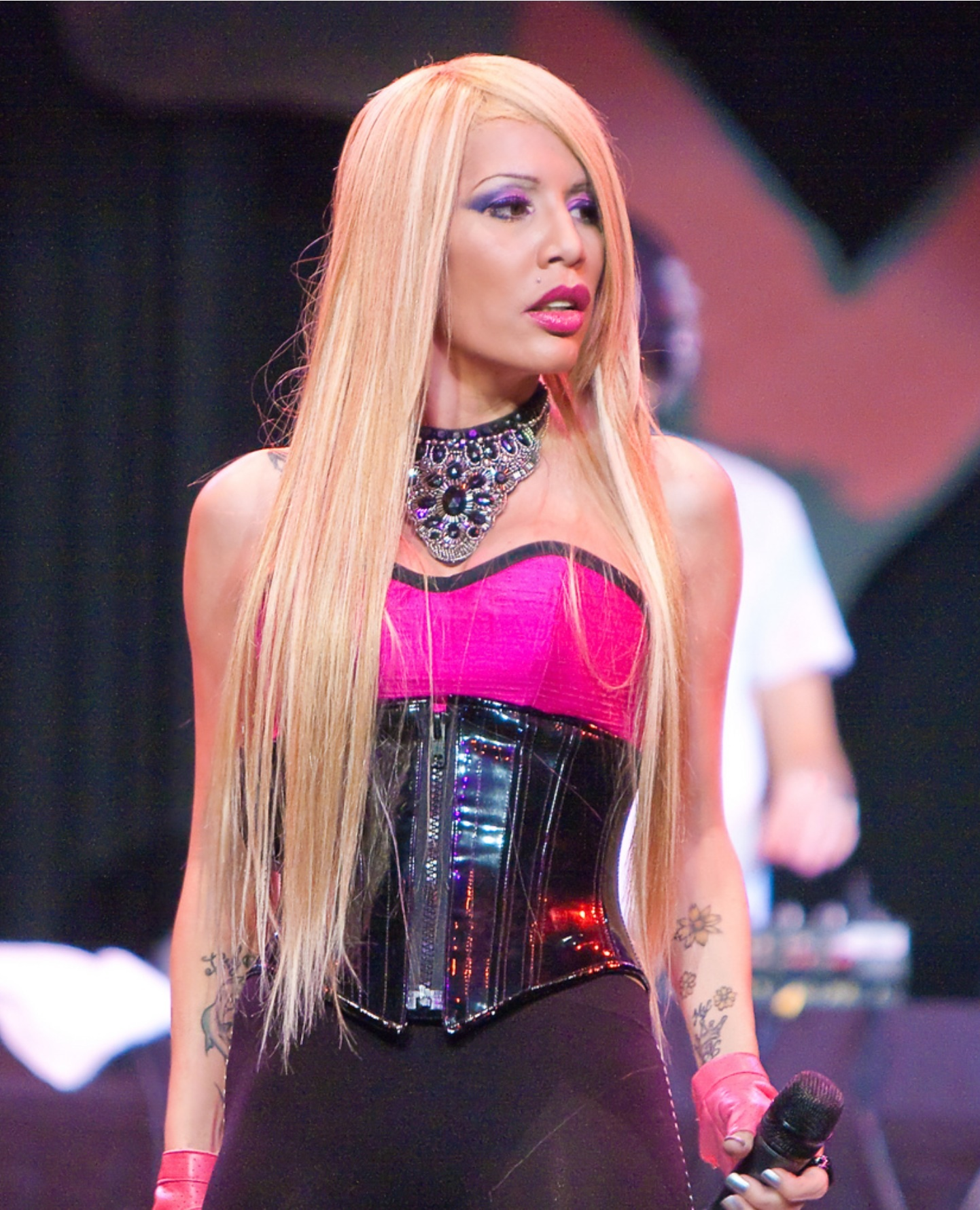
Ivy Queen (pictured) lent her vocals to "Dándole".

"Dándole" was composed by Jose Ángel Torres, known by his stage name Gocho, along with David Castro, Joel Munoz, Leo Vazquez James and Mervin Maldonado. Production was handled by Gocho, Dexter & Mr. Greenz and Hyde while additional production was provided by Noriega on the remix with Ivy Queen. The song was recorded at New Era Destination Studios in Fajardo, Puerto Rico and Dominican Hit Factory in Santo Domingo. Mixing was done by Jose Cotto along with Carlos Alvarez while Frank Jay served as arranger. Regarding production of the song, Gocho explained "the song is an urban electronic mambo" blending mambo, similar to merengue music and urban music. Lyrically, the song talks about sexual intercourse, "without desrespecting women".

== Reception ==
"Dándole" was released on January 25, 2011 originally with only Gocho and Jowell. The single was then re-released with remixes featuring Omega El Fuerte on March 8, 2011 and Ivy Queen on April 28, 2011. The music video was released the following day. On the Billboard Latin Songs chart, the song peaked at #22. While on the Billboard Latin Pop Songs chart, it peaked at #21. On the Billboard Latin Digital Songs chart, the song peaked at #14. On the Billboard Latin Rhythm Digital Songs chart, "Dándole" peaked at #6. On the Billboard Latin Rhythm Airplay chart, the song peaked at #5. It also peaked at #5 on the Billboard Latin Tropical Airplay chart. Internationally, it also reached #8 on Venezuela's Top Latino chart.

Joy Ramirez from Broadcast Music Inc. (BMI) called the song "a classically reggaeton party song," while claiming it to appeal to people of all ages. The song was awarded "Award-Winning Song" at the 19th Annual BMI Latin Music Awards which are hosted annually honoring the songwriters, composers and music publishers of the year's most–performed songs in the BMI catalog. It also received and award for "Urban Song of the Year" at the 2012 ASCAP Awards, which are awarded annually by the American Society of Composers, Authors and Publishers in the United States. Gocho performed the hit single on the television program Univision In Studio on February 3, 2011, along with other songs from the album.

== Charts ==
=== Weekly charts ===
Chart (2011)	Position
US Latin Songs (Billboard)	22
US Latin Pop Songs (Billboard)	21
US Latin Digital Songs (Billboard)	14
US Latin Rhythm Digital Songs (Billboard)	6
US Latin Rhythm Airplay (Billboard)	5
US Latin Tropical Airplay (Billboard)	5
Venezuela Top Latino (Record Report)	8

=== Year-end charts ===
Chart (2011)	Position
US Latin Rhythm Airplay (Billboard)	6
US Latin Rhythm Digital Songs (Billboard)	10
US Tropical Songs (Billboard)	12
Chart (2012)	Position
US Latin Rhythm Digital Songs (Billboard)	24
