= The Ultimate Urban Collection =

Compilation album by Héctor & Tito
- Released: May 22, 2007
- Genre: Reggaeton
- Label: Venemusic; Machete Music

Héctor & Tito chronology
Season Finale (2005)	The Ultimate Urban Collection (2007)

The Ultimate Urban Collection is the third compilation album by Héctor & Tito. This is also their second album released after their separation in 2005. From the samples in All Music, it's clear that some tracks are live while others are studio versions.

== Track listing ==
CD
No.	Title	Length
1.	"Caminaré Por El Mundo" (featuring Grupo Manía)	4:36
2.	"Que Será" (featuring La Secta)	7:50
3.	"Gata Celosa" (featuring Magnate & Valentino)	3:31
4.	"Pégate"	2:18
5.	"Noche De Loba" (featuring Víctor Manuelle & Noriega)	11:05
6.	"Gata Salvaje" (featuring Daddy Yankee & Nicky Jam)	3:20
7.	"Dale Latigazo" (featuring Daddy Yankee & Nicky Jam)	3:18
8.	"En Una Disco"	3:05
9.	"Después Que Cae La Lluvia" (featuring Domingo Quiñones)	3:30
10.	"Te Estás Calentando" (featuring Don Omar)	1:48
11.	"Ay Amor" (featuring Víctor Manuelle)	3:54
12.	"Morena" (featuring Glory & Don Omar)	3:06
13.	"Déjala" (featuring Don Omar)	1:56
14.	"Amor De Colegio" (featuring Don Omar)	3:06
15.	"Gata Salvaje" (Remix) (featuring Daddy Yankee & Nicky Jam)	3:27
16.	"Morena" (Remix) (featuring Glory & Don Omar)	2:36

DVD
No.	Title	Length
1.	"Ay Amor" (featuring Víctor Manuelle)	4:40
2.	"Morena" (featuring Glory & Don Omar)	3:06
3.	"Gata Celosa" (featuring Magnate & Valentino)	3:59
