= Quimica Perfecta =

Studio album by Magnate y Valentino
- Released: September 22, 2009
- Genre: Reggaeton
- Label: Machete Music/VI Music
- Producers: Mambo Kingz; Eliel; Santana; Fantasma

Magnate y Valentino chronology
Progresivo (2007)	Quimica Perfecta (2009)	Imparables (2013)

Quimica Perfecta (Perfect Chemistry) is the third studio album by Magnate & Valentino released on September 22, 2009.

== Track listing ==
#	Title	Producer(s)	Length
1	Oh, Oh	Mambo Kingz	2:47
2	Nobody	Mambo Kingz	3:23
3	Tentacion	Mambo Kingz	2:47
4	Una En Un Millon	Eliel	3:49
5	Si Yo Te Ame	Eliel	3:38
6	Si Te Acuerdas De Mi	Mambo Kingz	3:41
7	Tucu, Tucu	Santana	3:10
8	Pal`Carnaval	Eliel	2:55
9	El Castigo	Fantasma	3:52
10	Olvidar	Eliel	3:29

== Charts ==
Chart (2009)	Peak position
US Top Latin Albums (Billboard)	37
US Latin Rhythm Albums (Billboard)	5
