= Violencia Musical =

Studio album by Héctor y Tito
- Released: July 1, 1998
- Genre: Reggaeton
- Label: V.I. Music
- Producer: DJ Goldy, Coo-Kee, DJ Nelson

Héctor y Tito chronology
Violencia Musical (1998)	Nuevo Milenio (2000)

Violencia Musical ("Musical Violence") is the debut album by Hector & Tito, released in 1998.

== Track listing ==
Side A
No.	Title	Composers	Length
1.	"Intro"	Héctor & Tito	1:24
2.	"Artificiales Gatilleros"	Héctor & Tito	2:30
3.	"Fantasmas"	Nico Canada	1:58
4.	"Viviendo En Guerra" (featuring Lito & Polaco)	Héctor, Tito, Lito & Polaco	3:44
5.	"Violencia Musical"	Omar Bullegend & Julio Voltio	2:18
6.	"Una Noche"	Héctor & Tito	2:54

Side B
No.	Title	Composers	Length
7.	"¿Qué Será?"	Héctor & Tito	3:06
8.	"Amigo"	Héctor & Tito	2:14
9.	"Medley"	Héctor & Tito	3:19
10.	"Winchester & El Bambino" (featuring Daddy Yankee)	Tito & Winchester a.k.a. Daddy Yankee	3:03
11.	"No Estoy Guillao" (featuring Baby Ranks)	Baby Ranks, Héctor & Tito	2:23
