= Varon =

Varon or Varón is a surname. Notable people with the surname include:

- Adriana Salazar Varón (born 1963), Colombian chess master
- Ben Varon (born 1983), Finnish guitarist
- Elizabeth R. Varon (born 1963), American historian
- Keith Varon, American musician
- Lisa Marie Varon (born 1971), American professional wrestler, bodybuilder and fitness competitor
- Melissa Varón (born 1987), Colombian model
- Moshe Varon (1926–2007), Israeli footballer and manager
- Sara Varon, American writer and illustrator
- Yineth Varón (born 1982), Colombian footballer

== See also ==
- Varona
- Yunis–Varon syndrome, congenital disorder
