= Ranking Stone =

Puerto Rican reggaeton artist

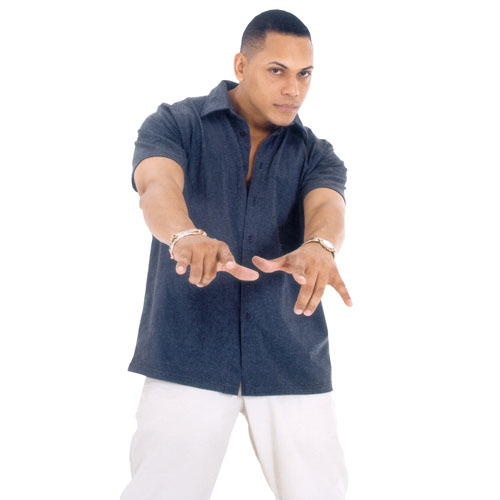
- Born: Pedro Cardona Santiago; 14 January 1973 (age 53); Hato Rey, Puerto Rico
- Other names: "El Rey De Los Melones" "Mr. Ranking"
- Occupation: Reggaeton singer
- Years active: 1992-present

Ranking Stone (born 14 January 1973) is a Puerto Rican reggaeton artist. He made four albums, Censurado being the most known. Censurado charted in the United States, reaching #36 on the Billboard Latin Albums chart and #4 on its Tropical Albums chart.

== Discography ==
=== Studio albums ===
- Atrevido (1994)
- Different Styles (1995)
- Censurado (2003)
- Al Rescate (2006)

=== Singles ===
- Sigue Batiendo 2 (con Brewley MC) (1992)
- Pide Mas (1994)
- Lirica Decente (1995)
- A Dios Le Pido (1996)
- Si Es Cuestión (1997)
- Llego El Escuadron (1998)
- En Panama (1999)
- Que Melones (2000)
- Yo Soy Un Bellako (2001)
- El Lechero (2002)
- Baila Conmigo (con Trebol Clan) (2003)
- Dale Mai (con Cheka) (2003)
- Tu Sabes (2004)
- Vuelvo & Salgo (2005)
- Donde Estas? (con Juno) (2006)
- Princesa (2007)
- Como Entender (con Jennifer Peña) (2008)
- A Romper La Disco (2009)
- Ware Monton (2010)
- Que Siga La Fiesta (con El Chicano) (2011)
- Lobo De Amor (con El Chicano) (2012)
- Enciende El Phillie (con Kris-D & El Trovon) (2013)
- Hasta Que Salga El Sol (2014)
- Reggaeton The Movie (2015)
- Mambo (2016)
- Hello (con Alberto Stylee, Falo & Rey Pirin) (2017)
- El Bam, Bam (2018)
- Qué Baúl (2019)
