= Naldo (producer) =

Puerto Rican record producer

- Birth name: Arnaldo Santos
- Genres: Reggaeton, pop rock, rock, hip hop
- Occupation(s): Producer, musician, songwriter
- Years active: 2004–present
- Labels: Sangre Nueva; Rimas

Naldo (born Arnaldo Santos) is a Puerto Rican reggaeton and rock producer, singer and guitarist. He was born in Comerío, Puerto Rico.

== Arrival at reggaeton ==
Naldo entered the world of reggaeton when the owners of Mas Flow Inc. Luny Tunes invited him to participate as a producer on the album Mas Flow 2. Later he met Hector Delgado, artistically known as Hector "El Father", who invited him to work on his label Gold Star Music and also to accompany him in the chorus, after having been separated from Efrain Fines (Tito El Bambino). Hector El Father and Naldo quickly formed a good friendship, and with the help of "El Father", Naldo created his own record label called Sangre Nueva Music with which launched the famous disc Sangre Nueva, with the important single "Sácala".

Such has been the success of the producer who has been invited to participate in the genre's most successful albums such as Barrio Fino (Daddy Yankee), Pa'l Mundo (Wisin & Yandel), The Bad Boy (Hector "El Father"), Real... En Vivo (Ednita Nazario), among plenty others.

His first solo album which is Lágrimas De Sangre (Tears of Blood) and was released in 2009. The first single was "Ya No Existen Detalles" ft. Jowell & Randy. It charted on Billboard's Latin Rhythm Airplay and peaked at #30.

In 2011, launched the second volume of Sangre Nueva (New Blood), which featured new urban music talents, both performers and producers. Sangre Nueva 2 has several recognized artists such as: Arcangel, Franco El Gorila, Ñengo Flow, Voltio, Yomo, JKing, among others.

In 2014, he was accused of defrauding new talent by KnockOut “La Maxima Apuesta”.

== Discography ==
- 2005: Sangre Nueva – with Héctor El Father
- 2009: Lágrimas de Sangre
- 2011: Sangre Nueva 2
