= Juicio Final =

Studio album by Héctor el Father
- Released: September 23, 2008
- Recorded: June 2008 – July 2008
- Studios: Mas Audio Production; Recording Studios, Levittown, Toa Baja, Puerto Rico
- Genres: Christian hip hop; reggaeton
- Length: 56:53
- Labels: Machete; VI
- Producers: Héctor el Father; Santana; Nerol; Rifo Kila

Héctor el Father chronology
Mi Trayectoria (2008)	Juicio Final (2008)	La Hora Cero (2021)

Singles from El Juicio Final
- 1. "Te Vi Llorar"; 2. "Y Llora"

Professional ratings
Review scores
Source	Rating
AllMusic	3/5 stars

Juicio Final (Spanish for Final Judgment) is the second studio album by former reggaeton artist Héctor el Father. It was released on September 23, 2008. The album features guest appearances from Cosculluela, Harry Maldonado and Lilly Goodman. The album was supported by the singles "Te Vi Llorar" and "Y Llora".

== Track listing ==
No.	Title	Length
1.	"Intro Juicio Final"	5:42
2.	"Mi Testimonio"	4:05
3.	"Se Nos Cae la Casa"	3:44
4.	"La Boda"	3:50
5.	"Payaso"	4:26
6.	"Y Llora"	4:43
7.	"Te Vi Llorar"	3:37
8.	"Entre el Bien y el Mal" (featuring Cosculluela)	4:53
9.	"Si Me Tocaras" (featuring Harry Maldonado)	4:07
10.	"Perdóname"	3:50
11.	"Tocaste la Puerte"	4:29
12.	"De Que Nos Vale"	3:21
13.	"Juicio Final" (featuring Lilly Goodman)	6:06
Total length:		56:53

== Chart performance ==
Chart (2008–09)	Peak position
US Billboard 200	113
US Billboard Top Latin Albums	3
US Billboard Latin Rhythm Albums	1
US Billboard Comprehensive Albums	128
