= Sin Límite (Magnate & Valentino album) =

Studio album by Magnate y Valentino
- Released: September 14, 2004
- Genre: Reggaeton
- Label: V.I. Music

Magnate y Valentino chronology
Rompiendo el Hielo (2002)	Sin Límite (2004)	Before & After (2006)

Sin Límite (Without Limit) is the second studio album of the musical duo Magnate & Valentino. It was released in 2004 following their debut album Rompiendo el Hielo in 2002.

== Track listing ==
1. "Intro" (0:54)
2. "Ahí Voy Yo" (3:07)
3. "Tu Amante" (3:48)
4. "Dile A Ella" (4:36)
5. "Bésame" (3:14)
6. "Ya Lo Sé" (3:46)
7. "Entre Tú Y Yo" (2:08)
8. "Fiera Callada" (3:43)
9. "La Soledad" (3:40)
10. "Punto Y Coma" (3:36)
11. "Métele Dembow" (3:33)
12. "Amanécete Conmigo" (3:15)
13. "Te Encontré - Magnate" (4:15)
14. "Vuelve A Mí" (3:38)
15. "Si Tú No Estás" (4:10)
16. "Amanécete Conmigo (Versión Dance Hall)"(3:32)

== Charts ==
Chart (2004)	Peak position
US Top Latin Albums (Billboard)	22
US Tropical Albums (Billboard)	6
US Heatseekers Albums (Billboard)	48
