= A la Reconquista =

Studio album by Héctor & Tito
- Released: November 5, 2002
- Genre: Reggaeton
- Label: VI
- Producer: Luny Tunes (Co-exec.); Eliel (Co-exec.); Noriega; DJ Nelson; Álex Gárgolas

Héctor & Tito chronology
Lo De Antes (2002)	A la Reconquista (2002)	La Historia Live (2003)

A la Reconquista is the third and final studio album by Héctor & Tito and their best known album as a duo, winning Rap Album of the Year at the 2003 Latin Billboard Music Awards. Later albums are just compilations of their best songs. Eliel and Luny Tunes were the main producers of this album.

== Track listing ==
No.	Title	Producer(s)	Length
1.	"Yo Te Buscaba"	Luny Tunes & Noriega	4:06
2.	"Gata Salvaje" (featuring Daddy Yankee & Nicky Jam)	Luny Tunes, Eliel	3:11
3.	"Besos en la Boca"	Luny Tunes, Eliel	2:59
4.	"Felina"		3:36
5.	"Despues Que Cae la Lluvia" (featuring Domingo Quiñones)		3:30
6.	"Noche de Loba" (featuring Noriega)		2:33
7.	"Caserío" (Héctor el Bambino featuring Don Omar)	Luny Tunes & Noriega	3:46
8.	"Tigresa"	Luny Tunes & Noriega, DJ Nelson	3:47
9.	"Duele" (only Tito El Bambino)	Eliel	2:17
10.	"Sientan el Rantantan" (Héctor el Bambino featuring Don Omar)	Luny Tunes & Eliel	2:53
11.	"Flores Pa' los Muertos" (only Héctor el Bambino)		2:41
12.	"Tra-Tra"	DJ Nelson	2:20
13.	"Bandida Universitaria"		3:19
14.	"De Niña A Mujer" (Héctor el Bambino featuring Don Omar)	Eliel, Álex Gárgolas	3:48
15.	"En Una Disco"		3:06

Bonus Track
No.	Title	Producer(s)	Length
16.	"Gata Salvaje (remix)" (featuring Daddy Yankee & Nicky Jam)	Luny Tunes, Eliel	3:27

== Charts ==
Chart (2002)	Peak position
US Top Latin Albums (Billboard)	9
US Latin Pop Albums (Billboard)	8
US Heatseekers Albums (Billboard)	9
