= Lo De Antes =

Lo de Antes

Compilation album by Héctor y Tito
- Released: April 5, 2002
- Genre: Reggaeton
- Label: Black Jack Music

Héctor y Tito chronology
Nuevo Milenio (2000)	Lo de Antes (2002)	A La Reconquista (2002)

Lo de Antes is Hector & Tito's first compilation album. It was released on April 5, 2002 under the label of Black Jack. This album contains tracks from their previous albums and albums from producers or DJs of the Reggaeton genre.

Arranged By, Mixed By, Mastered By, Edited By, Producer – DJ Goldy

== Track list ==
No.	Title	Producer(s)	Length
1.	"Voy Subiendo (THE NOISE 7 - 1997)"		4:23
2.	"El Maleante (GARGOLAS 1 - 1998)"		2:09
3.	"Mi Comienzo (DJ GOLDY 3..THE MELODY - 1997)"		2:11
4.	"Tentandome (New Song)"	DJ Nelson	3:13
5.	"La Loca (New Song)"	DJ Goldy	1:58
6.	"Artificiales Gatilleros (VIOLENCIA MUSICAL - 1998)"		2:26
7.	"Dicen (THA CREW 1 - 1996)"		1:44
8.	"Donde Estan (DREAM TEAM - 1998)"		2:56
9.	"Me Andan Buscando (BORICUAS NY 1 - 2000)"		2:27
10.	"Mataron A Un Inocente (EL CARTEL 1 - 1997)"		2:05
11.	"Una Noche (New Song)"	DJ Blass	3:15
12.	"Se Muere Tanta Gente (VIOLENCIA MUSICAL - 1998)"		3:06
