= Los Rompe Discotekas =

2006 compilation album by Héctor el Father

Compilation album by Héctor el Father and Jay-Z
- Released: June 27, 2006
- Recorded: 2005–2006
- Studio: Baseline Studios (New York City)
- Genre: Reggaeton; East Coast hip hop
- Length: 53:59
- Label: Roc-La-Familia; Machete; VI; Gold Star
- Producer: Héctor Delgado (also exec.); Shawn Carter (exec.); Mekka; Doble A & Nales; N.O.T.T.Y.; Revol; Tainy; Nesty la Mente Maestra; Víctor el Nasi; Bones

Héctor el Father and Jay-Z chronology
| Sangre Nueva (2005) | Los Rompe Discotekas (2006) | The Bad Boy (2006) |

Professional ratings
Review scores
| Source | Rating |
|---|---|
| AllMusic | 3.5/5 stars |

Los Rompe Discotekas is a 2006 compilation album by Héctor el Father. This album was released under the Roc-A-Fella Records label and under contract with Jay-Z. Popular singles include "Here We Go Yo" by Héctor el Father featuring Jay-Z, "Yomo Dele" by Yomo featuring Fat Joe, and "El Teléfono" by Héctor el Father and Wisin & Yandel. The album also features guest appearances by Roc-A-Fella artists such as Memphis Bleek and Freeway. The album has sold over one million copies. A remixed version of the album was released as El Rompe Discoteka: The Mix Album. As of May 2007, the album sold over 132,000 copies in the United States.

== Track listing ==
| # | Title | Featuring | Producer | Length |
|---|---|---|---|---|
| 1 | "Intro" | Gallego | | 5:22 |
| 2 | "Here We Go Yo" | Héctor el Father featuring Jay-Z | Doble A & Nales; N.O.T.T.Y. | 3:22 |
| 3 | "Yomo Dele" | Yomo featuring Fat Joe | N.O.T.T.Y.; Mekka; Revol | 3:10 |
| 4 | "El Teléfono" | Héctor el Father and Wisin & Yandel | Tainy | 3:56 |
| 5 | "La Cama" | Alexis & Fido | Mekka; N.O.T.T.Y.; Rifo Kila | 3:29 |
| 6 | "Sigue Ahí" | Zion and De La Ghetto featuring Memphis Bleek | Mekka | 3:49 |
| 7 | "Déjate Llevar" | Kartier | Mekka | 3:25 |
| 8 | "Ahora Son Mejor" | Don Omar | Mekka | 3:01 |
| 9 | "Tiburón" | Héctor el Father, Yomo and Polaco | Mekka; N.O.T.T.Y.; Rifo Kila | 3:51 |
| 10 | "Eje" | Ariel el Puro | Mekka; Rifo Kila; N.O.T.T.Y. | 2:51 |
| 11 | "Soñando" | Polaco featuring Freeway | | 4:02 |
| 12 | "Píyala" | Trébol Clan | DJ Joe; DJ Fat | 3:24 |
| 13 | "Duro Mueven" | Franco el Gorila | Nesty; Víctor el Nasi | 2:48 |
| 14 | "Duro" | Big Joe | | 2:47 |
| 15 | "Vengan Donde Mí" | Héctor el Father featuring Naldo | Luny Tunes; Tainy | 4:24 |

== Chart performance ==
| Chart (2006–07) | Peak position |
|---|---|
| US Billboard 200 | 31 |
| US Billboard Top Rap Albums | 10 |
| US Billboard Top Latin Albums | 1 |
| US Billboard Latin Rhythm Albums | 1 |
| US Billboard Top Compilation Albums | 2 |

== Sales and certifications ==
| Region | Certification | Certified units/sales |
|---|---|---|
| United States (RIAA) | 2× Platinum (Latin) | 200,000^{^} |
^{^} Shipments figures based on certification alone.

== The Mix Album ==
El Rompe Discoteka: The Mix Album

Compilation album by Héctor el Father
- Released: September 25, 2007
- Genre: Reggaeton
- Label: Machete; VI
- Producer: Héctor el Father; DJ Creepy

Héctor el Father chronology
| Bad Boy: The Concert (2007) | El Rompe Discoteka: The Mix Album (2007) | The Bad Boy: The Most Wanted Edition (2007) |

El Rompe Discoteka: The Mix Album is a 2007 compilation album by Héctor el Father.

=== Track listing ===
1. "Intro"
2. "Vamos a Matarnos en la Raya"
3. "Maldades"
4. "Noche de Travesura"
5. "El Rompe Discoteka Mix"
6. "Ahora Es Que Es"
7. "Hello Mama"
8. "Voy Subiendo"
9. "Intro Bad Boy"
10. "Envidia"
11. "Ronca"
12. "Tiraera 1"
13. "Rumor de Guerra"
14. "Tiraera 2/Rumor de Guerra"
15. "No Mames Guey"
16. "Mirándonos"
17. "Interlude"
18. "Tú Quieres Duro"
19. "Te Vas"
20. "Sola"
21. "El Rompe Discoteka"
22. "Bad Boy Remix 'La Tiraera'"
23. "Romantiqueo Remix"
