= Nuevo Milenio =

Studio album by Héctor & Tito
- Released: June 25, 2000
- Genre: Reggaeton
- Label: Lester Productions

Héctor & Tito chronology
| Violencia Musical (1998) | Nuevo Milenio (2000) | Lo de Antes (2001) |

Nuevo Milenio (English: New Millennium) is Hector & Tito's second studio album.

== Track list ==
All tracks are written by Héctor & Tito.

Side A
| No. | Title | Length |
|---|---|---|
| 1. | "Intro: Tinieblas" | 1:02 |
| 2. | "Camino al Dolor" | 2:50 |
| 3. | "Desvivo" | 2:23 |
| 4. | "Amigo Padre" | 4:00 |
| 5. | "Ellos Hablan" | 2:23 |
| 6. | "Entre El Bien y El Mal" | 2:27 |

Side B
| No. | Title | Length |
|---|---|---|
| 7. | "Señor Redentor" (featuring José Feliciano) | 3:44 |
| 8. | "Sociedad" (featuring Gallego) | 3:18 |
| 9. | "Aqui No Vale" | 2:10 |
| 10. | "El Pequeño Antonio" | 2:28 |
| 11. | "Tu Me Haces Falta" | 5:14 |

== Personnel ==
- All lyrics were provided by Héctor & Tito. Music was provided by Goldy except for track 11. José M. Lugo provided the music for that track.
- Fred Tovar provided the acoustic guitar for tracks 4 and 7. He also provided the keyboards for track 6.

== Charts ==
| Chart (2002) | Peak Position |
|---|---|
| US Latin Pop Albums (Billboard) | 11 |
| US Top Latin Albums (Billboard) | 27 |
