= Sangre Nueva =

2005 album by Héctor el Father and Naldo

Compilation album by Héctor el Father and Naldo
- Released: June 14, 2005; April 25, 2006 (special edition)
- Recorded: 2004–2005
- Genre: Reggaeton; hip hop; R&B
- Label: Gold Star; Universal Latino
- Producer: Héctor el Father (exec.); Naldo (exec.); Luny Tunes; Nesty la Mente Maestra; Nely el Arma Secreta; Tainy; Bones

Héctor el Father chronology
Los Anormales (2004)	Sangre Nueva (2005)	Los Rompe Discotekas (2006)

Naldo chronology
Sangre Nueva (2005)	Lágrimas De Sangre (2009)

Sangre Nueva (New Blood) is a compilation album by Héctor el Father and reggaeton producer Naldo. It was released on August 30, 2005, by Gold Star Music and distributed by Universal Music Latino. Sangre Nueva featured a host of guest artists and marked the beginning of many future reggaeton stars, such as Arcángel & De la Ghetto, Yomo, Franco el Gorila, Gadiel, Kartier and Dandyel and the reggaeton producer Tainy.

Recorded and produced between 2004 and 2005 in Puerto Rico, the album's main purpose and theme was to introduce new artists from the reggaeton genre to the audience and to present a new generation of artists to the world. Created to respond to the tidal wave of worldwide interest in reggaeton, the album consisted on two discs and 29 new tracks.

The album was supported by several music videos released for singles, including the singles Sacala and Dejale Caer To el Peso. The album debuted at number two on US Top Latin Album and debut at number 131 on US Billboard 200. A special edition was released on April 25, 2006, and a DVD edition on June 19, 2007.

== Background ==
On December 21, 2004, Hector el Father released his first solo project Los Anormales. The album was a commercial success breaking all time records on Puerto Rico selling over 130,000 copies in just two days. Eventually, it was certified platinum (Latin) by the RIAA for selling over 200,000 copies and debuted at the Top five on US Billboard Top Latin Albums. Following that, Hector embarked on a promotional tour to promote the album.

During 2005, Hector el Father teamed up with his producer Naldo, to release a compilation album with old and new reggaeton acts. Also, with the collaboration of new reggaeton producers such as Tainy. The album consist of two discs and 29 new tracks including participation and collaboration of new reggaeton acts and mainstream established acts. On October 17, 2011, the producer Naldo released a sequel of the album titled Sangre Nueva 2.

== Reception ==
=== Critical reception ===
The album receive positive reviews by fans and critics alike. All Music gave a positive review to the album writing "This meaty double-disc set is a reggaeton lover's dream come true."

=== Commercial Reception ===
The album debut at number three on US Top Latin Albums and two on US Billboard Top Compilation albums. Also, it debut at number 131 on US Billboard 200 on the issue of the week September 17, 2005. The album success helped make him one of the top reggaeton acts while the album charted on the Top Latin Albums, he had a few other solo songs chart on Hot Latin Songs.

== Tracklist ==
Disc one

1. "Intro" and "Sácala" (by Héctor el Father, Naldo, Don Omar, Wisin & Yandel) (produced by Naldo) – 4:50
2. "A Romper La Disco" (by Tommy Viera and Daddy Yankee) (produced by Tainy) – 2:48
3. "Déjale Caer To' el Peso" (by Héctor el Father and Yomo) (produced by Naldo, Tainy, Nely) – 4:10
4. "Restralla" (by Franco el Gorila, Wisin) (produced by Nesty, Naldo) – 2:52
5. "Se La Monté" (by Gadiel, Lobo, and Yandel) (produced by Naldo, Nely, Nesty, Luny Tunes) – 2:54
6. "Gata Psycho" (by Wibal & Alex) (produced by Naldo, Nesty) – 2:51
7. "Bailando Sola" (by Kartier) (produced by Luny Tunes, Nely, Naldo) – 3:33
8. "Ven Pégate" (by Arcángel & De la Ghetto, Zion) (produced by Naldo, Tainy) – 3:55
9. "Guerrilla" (by Ñengo Flow and Julio Voltio) (produced by Naldo) – 3:06
10. "Nueva Sangre" (by Abrante & Caico, Tego Calderón) (produced by Luny Tunes) – 3:14
11. "5 Minutos" (by Naldo) (produced by Naldo, Tainy) – 3:17
12. "Tigresa" (by Joan & O'Neill) (produced by Naldo, Nesty, Víctor el Nasi) – 2:34
13. "La Cola" (by Jomar and Héctor el Father) (produced by Naldo, Nesty, Víctor el Nasi, Álex Gárgolas) – 2:45
14. "Pa' Que Sudes" (by K-Mill) (produced by Naldo, Nesty, Tainy, Bones, Luny Tunes) – 2:29
15. "Sedúceme" (by Danny & Chillin) (produced by Naldo, Nely, Luny Tunes) – 7:32

Disc two

16. "Intro" (by Héctor el Father, Naldo, Don Omar, Wisin & Yandel) (produced by Naldo) – 5:23
17. "Uaaa" (by Ariel "El Puro" and Notty) (produced by Naldo, Nesty, N.O.T.T.Y) – 2:23
18. "Activaó" (by Mr. Philips and Baby Ranks) (produced by Naldo, Luny Tunes) – 2:51
19. "Cuando Bailes" (by Baron) (produced by Naldo, Nesty) – 2:53
20. "How You Feel" (by Severe & Sincere) (produced by Nesty) – 3:03
21. "Rómpela" (by Albert & el Skizzo) (produced by Naldo, Nesty) – 2:31
22. "Descontrólate" (by Dandyel, Angel & Khriz) (produced by Naldo, Tainy, Nely) – 3:27
23. "Mil Envidiosos" (by Yo-Seph) (produced by Naldo, Nesty) – 2:58
24. "Pégala" (by Q-Killa) (produced by Naldo, Nesty) – 2:12
25. "La Carretilla" (by Jenny la Sexy Voz) (produced by Naldo, Nesty, Víctor, Nales) – 2:18
26. "Tengo Control" (by Odyssey, Yaga & Mackie) (produced by Naldo, Nesty, Víctor) – 3:23
27. "Quiero" (by Felina) (produced by Naldo, Luny Tunes, Nesty) – 2:47
28. "Slow Down" (by Moreno Luzunariz) (produced by Naldo, Nesty) – 3:19
29. "Me Huele a Guerra" (by Noztra) (produced by Naldo, Nesty, Luny Tunes) – 3:45

== Music videos ==
- "Sácala" – Wisin & Yandel, Naldo, Héctor el Father, Don Omar, Daddy Yankee, Tego Calderón, Julio Voltio, Zion
- "Déjale Caer To' el Peso" – Yomo featuring Héctor
- "Bailando Sola" – Kartier
- "Uaa" – Ariel featuring Notty
- "Pa' Que Sudes" – K-Mill
- "Gata Psycho" – Wibal & Alex
- "No Quiere Novio" – Ñejo
- "Que Se Retire" – Naldo
- "Yo Sigo Aqui" – Naldo featuring Héctor
- "Voy" – Naldo
- "Yo Sigo Aqui (live)" – Naldo featuring Héctor

== Chart performance ==
Chart (2005)	Peak position
U.S. Billboard 200	131
U.S. Billboard Top Compilation Albums	2
U.S. Billboard Top Latin Albums	3
U.S. Billboard Latin Rhythm Albums	2
