= Glory (singer) =

Puerto Rican singer

- Birth name: Glorimar Montalvo Castro
- Also known as: La Gata Gangster
- Born: February 14, 1979 (age 46)
- Origin: Santurce, Puerto Rico
- Genres: Reggaeton
- Years active: 1995–present
- Labels: VI; Machete

Glorimar Montalvo Castro (born February 14, 1979), known professionally as Glory, is a Puerto Rican reggaeton singer.

== Music career ==
Glory has one of reggaeton's most recognized female voices. She has popularized phrases such as suelta como gabete ("loose as a shoestring", slang meaning "promiscuous") and dame más gasolina ("give me more gasoline"). During her career to date, she has collaborated in the productions of artists such as Daddy Yankee ("Gasolina"), Luny Tunes y Noriega (La Gata Suelta), Don Omar ("Dale Don Dale", La Traicionera, Suelta Como Gabete, La Loba), Héctor & Tito ("Baila morena"), Eddie Dee (Donde Hubo Fuego) and others. Listeners may recognize Glory by her distinctive moaning sounds in many reggaeton songs. She formed part of the famed "La Industria" or DJ Eric Industry. She collaborated on some of the early underground cassettes distributed among the Puerto Rican population, which include: Street Style 1, Street Style 2, and DJ Eric Industry Volumes 1-5.

Glory is known to audiences in Central and South America, Spain and the United States. One of her most recent hits was "La Popola", which was even banned from some countries for its sexual content. In 2005, she released her debut CD Glou, which, according to the official website, sold over 100,000 copies in Latin America.

The singles "Perreo 101" and "La Traicionera" with Don Omar are two of her best-known hits. A new version of "La Popola" together with fellow-rapper Valentino (of the duo Magnate & Valentino) was also released, entitled "A Popolera".

== Discography ==
=== Albums ===
- 2005: Glou

=== Singles ===
- La Popola
- Perreo 101
- Suelta Como Gabete
- La Traicionera (featuring Don Omar)
- Ahora Me Rio Yo (featuring Julio Voltio)
- Duro 2013
- Soy

=== Other songs ===
- Noche Loca
- Torque
- La Popola
- Piedra Papel Tijera
- Vamos A Perrearnos
- Hagamos El Amor
- Las Gatas Activa
- Hay Algo En Ti
- La Bandolera
- El Mani
- Chouchianna

=== Other ===
Collaborations

- "Gasolina" (Daddy Yankee featuring Glory)
- "No Me Dejes Solo" (Daddy Yankee featuring Wisin & Yandel and Glory)
- Machete (Daddy Yankee featuring Glory)
- Castigo (Ranking Stone featuring Glory)
- Gata Celosa (Magnate & Valentino featuring Héctor & Tito and Glory)
- "Baila Morena" (Héctor & Tito featuring Don Omar & Glory)
- Quisiera (Luny Tunes y Noriega featuring Jon Erick, LaRoca Osorio and Glory)
- Donde Hubo Fuego (Daddy Yankee featuring Valerie & Glory)

Music videos

- (Suelta Como) Gabete
- Acelera
- Lento/Un Paso
- Gata Gargola
- La Popola

Albums appearances

| Year | Album | Song(s) featured on |
|---|---|---|
| 2003 | Luny Tunes y Noriega: Mas Flow | "La Gata Suelta" |
| 2005 | Reggaeton Best Remix | "Outro" [Glou album version]; "Matarnos en La Raya, Acelera, Popola" [Mix] |
| 2005 | Sandungueo.com: Reggaeton Hits, Vol. 1 | "Dúro" |
| 2005 | Reggaeton Hitmakers | "Gata Gargola", "La Popola" [Merengue version] |
| 2005 | Reggaeton Hit Makers II | "Tentación y Pecado" |
| 2005 | Greatest Reggaeton Beats | "El Duelo" |
| 2006 | Reggaeton Hitmakers Love Stories | "Te Vas", "La Traicionera" |
| 2006 | Reggaeton Hitmakers Tropical Blend | "Un Paso", "Dale, Dale" |
| 2006 | Machete Music Chart Topping Smash Hits '06 | "La Traicionera" |

== Filmography ==
| Year | Title | Role |
|---|---|---|
| 2008 | Talento de barrio | Tata |
