= Mario VI =

Puerto Rican musician

- Born: Mario Abner Rivera Rivera; January 22, 1978 (age 47); Canóvanas, Puerto Rico
- Occupations: Singer; songwriter; record producer
- Years active: 1997-present
- Known for: Founder of VI Music
- Musical career
- Genres: Reggaeton
- Instrument: Vocals
- Labels: VI; Machete

Mario Abner Rivera Rivera (born January 22, 1978), known professionally as Mario VI, is a Puerto Rican singer, songwriter, and record producer.

Born in Canóvanas, Puerto Rico, Rivera worked in the business side of the industry before becoming a recording artist. He founded the record label VI Music. He was for a long time the primary chorist of the Puerto Rican Reggaeton artist Don Omar. Now he works for Spanish Broadcasting System (SBS) for a radio station La Nueva 94 (WOND 94.7FM WODA 94.1FM) in Puerto Rico, main urban radio station. He is co-host to a daily radio show (M-F) at 3PM-7PM with El Coyote, however "El Goldo y la Pelua" are in the first position at that time.

He is also a successful comedian, songwriter, radio personality and recently (2015) became a father with current wife Michelle.

== Singles ==
- "El Brindis" (2007)
- "Dos Amantes, Dos Amigos" (featuring la Sista) (2008)

=== Featured singles ===
- "Ella Sabe Que Se Ve Bien" (Gallego featuring Mario VI) (2006)

== Album appearances ==
- Los Bandoleros (2005)
- Los Bandoleros Reloaded (2006)
- Gargolas: The Next Generation (2006)
- Tributo Urbano a Héctor Lavoe (2007)
- El Pentágono (2007)
- El Pentágono: The Return (2008)
- Los Bravos Relouded (2008)
- Alex Gargolas Presenta: Los Brothers (2008)
- DJ Joe: The Comeback (2017)
