= Héctor el Father =

Puerto Rican rapper (born 1978)

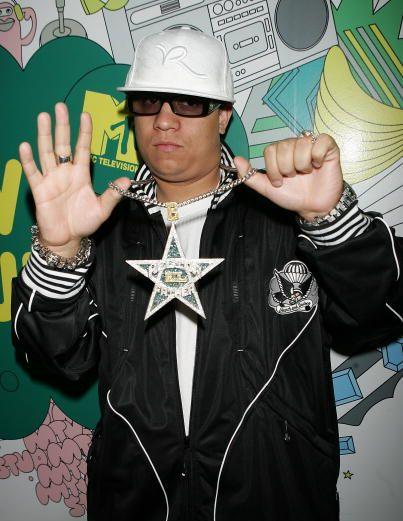
- Héctor el Father on MTV

Background information
- Also known as: Héctor el Bambino
- Born: Héctor Luis Delgado Román; September 12, 1978 (age 48); Carolina, Puerto Rico
- Genres: Reggaeton; Latin Christian; Latin hip-hop
- Occupations: Rapper; singer; songwriter; record producer; pastor
- Years active: 1993–2008
- Labels: VI; Universal Latino; Gold Star; Machete; Roc-La-Familia; Maranatha; Nain
- Spouse: Jennifer Carrasquillo (m. 2008)

Héctor Luis Delgado Román (born September 12, 1978), also known by his stage name Héctor el Father, is a Puerto Rican rapper, singer, songwriter, record producer and pastor. He rose to fame as a member of the duo Héctor & Tito Los Bambinos. As a producer, he is credited with discovering several major artists such as Tempo, Don Omar and Wisin & Yandel.

After becoming a born-again christian, he announced his retirement from music on September 3, 2008, with the album Juicio Final, but his series of Farewell Concerts went on until May 2010. After retirement, he obtained a degree in Theology at Southern Methodist University and has dedicated his life to Christianity.

In 2015, he founded Maranatha Radio Ministries in Río Grande, Puerto Rico. In his recent work as a preacher, he has touched many lives, moving many rappers to follow in his footsteps including Tito el Bambino and Almighty. He has also been prolific in the field of linguistics, coining several terms which have remained in Puerto Rican slang for decades such as calenturri, as well as phrases including sácala, dale úsala (which was used in get-out-the-vote campaigns in 2020).

In 2018, he wrote and starred in the autobiographic movie Héctor el Father: Conocerás la Verdad, which chronicled his conversion to Christianity. In 2021, he released his third studio album La Hora Cero, which is the first one released under his real name and only contains religious music.

== Biography ==
He was born on September 12, 1978, in Carolina, Puerto Rico, under the name Héctor Luis Delgado Román.

In 2008, he married Jennifer Carrasquillo. The couple has two children together. He also has a daughter from a previous relationship.

== Career ==
=== Los Bambinos ===
Héctor joined Efraín Fines Nevares (later known as Tito El Bambino) and formed the duo Héctor & Tito ("Los Bambinos"). Héctor & Tito released their first album in 1998. Together they became reggaeton stars releasing several successful albums and making appearances in several compilations, becoming one of the most sought-out duos in the genre. Both became the first reggaeton artists to sell out a massive concert in Puerto Rico, opening the path to other artists such as Tego Calderón, Daddy Yankee, Don Omar, and Wisin & Yandel. As a duet both captured the world's attention and made reggaeton a popular genre, winning awards such as the Billboard Latin Music Award for Latin Rap Album of the Year for their album A la Reconquista.

In 2004, the duo announced their breakup, and each of them has continued with their separate careers.

=== Gold Star Music ===
Delgado followed the success of Trébol Clan with his compilation album titled Los Anormales which went on to break all record sales in Puerto Rico with 130,000 copies sold in just two days. Los Anormales featured reggaeton artists such as Daddy Yankee, Don Omar, Trébol Clan, Divino, Zion, and the duo Alexis & Fido.

In February, Delgado performed in the Canary Islands during their big Carnival festivities. His performance was a sold-out success. His song "Baila Morena", which Delgado produced for Héctor & Tito, was one of the songs with the most airplay in Puerto Rico.

=== Roc-A-Fella Records ===
In mid-2005, Delgado signed an agreement with Roc-A-Fella Records owner Jay-Z to promote him in the United States through the newly founded Roc-A-Fella sub-label Roc-La-Familia. The label, created to house international artists, would have Jay-Z and Héctor both produce and perform on a compilation album. The album titled Los Rompe Discotekas featured top-of-the-line artists both from the United States hip-hop and Spanish reggaeton music industries.

Additionally, Delgado became the Hispanic image for, what was at that time, the Roc-A-Fella-owned clothing line Rocawear. The advertising campaign including his image was featured in TV spots, print, and billboards. The agreement included a deal for Rocawear to sponsor Delgado's clothing designs under the label Bambino. The clothing deal included Héctor designing tennis shoes to be released as part of Jay-Z's "S. Carter Collection" under Reebok.

=== Solo career ===
On September 16, 2005, he presented two sold-out concerts titled The Bad Boy in Puerto Rico with artists like Wisin & Yandel, Alexis & Fido, Trébol Clan, Fat Joe, Polaco, and others.

Delgado has become one of the most successful producers, not only in the reggaeton genre but in the Latin American music business, even working with renowned Cuban producer Emilio Estefan.

In January 2008, Delgado decided to lose weight and contracted José Bonilla, a personal trainer to help him. He also began practicing the Atkins diet. At the beginning of this weight program he weighed 221 pounds and by the end had lost 31 pounds.

In 2009 he became an evangelical Christian member of the Iglesia Cristo Misionero in Canóvanas.

After leaving the music scene in 2008, he studied theology at Southern Methodist University and obtained a Bachelor of Divinity.

=== "Harlem Shake" controversy ===
It was confirmed by Delgado that an audio clip from a remix called "Los terroristas" with the line con los terroristas was used uncredited in the opening of Baauer's "Harlem Shake", which became a viral internet sensation in February 2013. Baauer had referred to the voice in the opening of his song, as "The dude in the beginning I got somewhere off the Internet, I don't even know where" in an earlier interview. Delgado told WAPA-TV's Lo Sé Todo that he was working with his lawyers and that he planned to meet with them the next week to discuss his next steps.

Diplo, head of Mad Decent and frontman of dancehall group Major Lazer, helped settle the legal dispute in April 2013.

== Ministry ==
In 2015, he founded Maranatha Radio Ministries in Río Grande, Puerto Rico.

In 2018, he became pastor of the evangelical church Iglesia Maranatha in Río Grande.

== Remixes ==
In 2012, American music producer Baauer sampled his 2006 song “Maldades” as part of Harlem Shake which became an internet sensation and earned a double-platinum certification.

In 2018, Bad Bunny did a remix of Héctor el Father's "Vamos pa' la Calle" in song “Tu no Metes Cabras” which became a triple-platinum hit and peaked at number 31 at the Billboards Hot 50 charts.

== Discography ==
=== With Tito el Bambino ===
==== Studio albums ====
- Violencia Musical (1998)
- Nuevo Milenio (2000)
- A la Reconquista (2002)

==== Compilation albums ====
- Lo De Antes (2002)
- Season Finale 1998-2003 (2005)
- The Ultimate Urban Collection (2007)

==== Live albums ====
- La Historia Live (2003)

=== As a Solo Artist ===
==== Studio albums ====
- 2006: The Bad Boy
- 2008: Juicio Final
- 2021: La Hora Cero (as Héctor Delgado)

==== Live albums ====
- 2007: Bad Boy: The Concert

==== Compilation albums ====
- 2002: The Godfather
- 2004: Los Anormales
- 2005: Sangre Nueva
- 2005: Gold Star Music: Reggaeton Hits
- 2006: Los Rompe Discotekas
- 2007: El Rompe Discoteka: The Mix Album
- 2007: The Bad Boy: The Most Wanted Edition
- 2008: Mi Trayectoria

== Filmography ==
Year	Title	Role
2018	Hector el Father: Conocerás la Verdad	Himself
