= The Bad Boy (album) =

Studio album by Héctor el Father
- Released: November 21, 2006
- Recorded: August–October 2006
- Studio: Crescent Moon Studios
- Genre: Reggaeton
- Length: 1:03:02
- Label: Machete; VI
- Producer: Mambo Kingz; Tainy; Mekka; N.O.T.T.Y; Rifo Killa

Héctor el Father chronology
Los Rompe Discotekas (2006)	The Bad Boy (2006)	Bad Boy: The Concert (2007)

Singles from The Bad Boy
- 1. "El Teléfono" Released: June 11, 2006; 2. "Sola" Released: November 21, 2006

Professional ratings
Review scores
Source	Rating
AllMusic	3.5/5 stars

The Bad Boy is the first solo album by former reggaeton artist Héctor el Father. The album features guest appearances from Mr. Notty, Ednita Nazario, Ken-Y, Polaco and Wisin & Yandel. The album was supported by the single "Sola" which was released alongside the album on November 21, 2006.

On the U.S. Billboard 200, it debuted at number 81, with about 20,000 copies sold in its first week. The album has sold more than 200,000 copies and has received various nominations in the Latin community, including one for a Lo Nuestro Award for Urban Album of the Year.

== Track listing ==
No.	Title	Length
1.	"Intro"	3:36
2.	"Rumor de Guerra (featuring Mr. Notty)"	3:54
3.	"Maldades"	3:36
4.	"Sola"	2:53
5.	"Ahora Es Que Es "Paola""	3:25
6.	"Si Supieras (featuring Ednita Nazario)"	3:12
7.	"Hello Mama"	2:37
8.	"Fría"	3:36
9.	"Boom Bye Bye"	2:35
10.	"Te Vas (featuring Ken-Y)"	2:49
11.	"Viviendo en Guerra"	3:47
12.	"Vamo' Allá"	2:37
13.	"En Busca de Ti (featuring Polaco)"	3:43
14.	"Te Encontré"	3:00
15.	"Cuidao'"	5:21
16.	"No Mames Güey"	2:21
17.	"El Teléfono" (featuring Wisin & Yandel)	3:55
18.	"Outro – Hipócritas"	6:05
Total length:		1:03:02

=== The Bad Boy: The Most Wanted Edition ===
On October 9, 2007, he released a special edition titled The Bad Boy: The Most Wanted Edition. It included a second disc with more songs and more featured artists. It also included a DVD.

== Charts ==
Chart (2006–07)	Peak position
US Billboard 200	81
US Billboard Top Latin Albums	2
US Billboard Latin Rhythm Albums	1

== Certifications ==
Region	Certification	Certified units/sales
United States (RIAA)	Platinum (Latin)	100,000^{^}
^{^} Shipments figures based on certification alone.
