= Magnate & Valentino =

Puerto Rican reggaeton duo

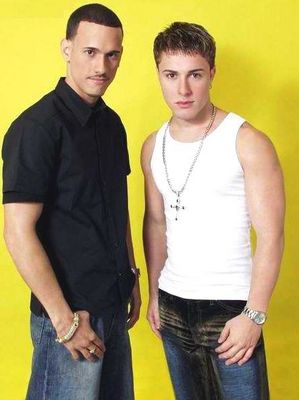

Background information
- Also known as: Los Nene
- Origin: Puerto Rico
- Genres: Reggaeton
- Years active: 1998–2013
- Labels: VI; Machete; Venemusic
- Members: Magnate (Ramón del Robledo Nuñez Oliviera); Valentino (Peter González Torres)
- Website: www.magnateyvalentino.net

The article covers the duo's career as well the individual careers of Magnate and Valentino after break-up

Magnate & Valentino were a Puerto Rican reggaeton duo made up of Ramón del Robledo Nuñez Oliviera known as Magnate (born 24 October 1982) and Peter González Torres known as Valentino (born 12 July 1980). The duo were initially called Los Nene before adopting the name Magnate y Valentino. They were among the first duos to include ballads and romantic songs in the discography. Having debuted in 1998 in an artists compilation album The Warriors 2: Batalla En Dos Tiempos, the two continued to be featured in other compilations like Tha Cream 4, 9 Plagas 2, The Flow 2 and The show en la Feria. However it was with Rompiendo el Hielo their debut album in 2002 that they were highlighted cooperating with Héctor & Tito in "Gata Celosa" and with Nicky Jam in "Quiero que hagas mujer". "Te Buscaré" arranged by Alejandro Montalván and Eduardo Reyes, was a huge hit. The follow-up albums were Sin Límite (2004), and Quimica Perfecta (2009). The duo also collaborated with Don Omar in the hit "Dile a Ella". Imparables became the duo's last album together in 2013. Soon after, the duo separated and each continued with a solo career.

== Discography ==
=== Albums ===
- 2002: Rompiendo el Hielo
- 2004: Sin Límite
- 2009: Quimica Perfecta
- 2013: Imparables

Compilation albums

- 2006: Before & After
- 2011: Ultimate Collection

=== Singles ===
- "Bésame"
- "Dile A Ella (feat. Don Omar)
- "Gata Celosa" (feat. Héctor & Tito)
- "Reggaetón"
- "Si Te Acuerdas De Mí"
- "Tal Vez"
- "Te Buscaré"
- "Vuelve A Mí"

== After the break up ==
=== Magnate ===
Magnate
- Also known as: Magnate (The One and Only)
- Born: Ramón del Robledo Nuñez Oliviera; 24 October 1982 (age 43); San Juan, Puerto Rico
- Genres: Reggaeton
- Occupation: Singer
- Labels: VI; Machete

Ramón del Robledo Nuñez Oliviera (born 24 October 1982) known as Magnate also known as The One And Only announced in a press release that he and Valentino were going their separate ways by saying: "We were together at all stages as a duet of Puerto Rican urban music, to the point of marking the history of this genre with new styles in melodies and lyrical content. Undoubtedly, the results of this duo were always incredible, but now in 2014, I feel I am ready to present my new musical output outside the partnership".

Even before the break-up had released his debut solo album, Progresivo in 2007. He has since released a number of successful singles and collaborations notably with Nicky Jam and Ñengo Flow.

==== Discography: Magnate ====
Albums

- 2007: Progresivo
- 2014: Magnate: Greatest Hits (compilation)

Singles

- 2007: "Nuestro amor es asi"
- 2013: "Dime"
- 2014: "Dándote" (feat. Nicky Jam)
- 2015: "Emborrachame"
- 2015: "Bandida"
- 2015: "Tu me enciendes" (feat. Ñengo Flow)
- 2017: "Caerán"
- 2017: "Dame una señal"
- 2017: "Te robaré"
- 2018: "Quédate conmigo"
- 2018: "Que nos paso"

=== Valentino ===
Valentino
- Born: Peter González Torres; 12 July 1980 (age 45); Puerto Rico
- Genres: Reggaeton
- Occupation: Singer
- Labels: VI; Machete

Peter González Torres (born 12 July 1980) has also developed his own solo career. In 2006, even while in the duo, Valentino became part of the group Los Compadres with Mario VI and Gocho. They released their collaborative album called Los Compadres: La Perfecta Ocasión with all three working together as well as in separate tracks.

Valentino has also developed actively his solo career. In 2017, he released "Bésame" featuring the young upcoming artist Manuel Turizo Zapata (better known as MTZ Manuel Turizo).

Valentino has two brothers and besides music, he also into sports playing basketball.

==== Discography: Valentino ====
Albums

- 2006: Los Compadres: La Perfecta Ocasión (Valentino, Mario VI & Gocho)
- 2014: My Self

Singles

- 2017: "Bésame" (featuring Manuel Turizo)

Featured in

- 2012: "Perreo por ley" (Franco "El Gorila" feat. Valentino, O'Neill)
