= Álex Gárgolas =

Puerto Rican record producer (born 1971)

- Born: Rafael Alexis Quiles Hernández; April 24, 1971 (age 54)
- Origin: Puerto Rico
- Genres: Reggaeton
- Occupation: Record producer
- Years active: 1995–present
- Labels: VI; Machete; Rimas; Sonar

Rafael Alexis Quiles Hernández, known professionally as Álex Gárgolas, is a reggaeton producer best known for the Gárgolas series which has been five albums so far.

His 2006 installation of the series managed to debut at number 181 on the Billboard 200, reaching number 6 on both the Latin Albums and Latin Rhythm Albums charts.

== Musical career ==
In 1995, using his savings of $300, he produced music by a few fledgling artists, two who became the well-known, chart-topping reggaeton artists known as Wisin & Yandel.

In 2019, Gárgolas produced "Mi Llamada" (remix), a collaboration with emerging artists from Argentina and Puerto Rico.

In 2020, Gárgolas spearheaded the production of "Del Barrio a la Ciudad", a song that mixes traditional Mexican corridos with Farruko's urban sound.

In 2022, Gárgolas visited Chile claiming to want to produce a Chilean reggaeton album, but instead offended the urban musical artists of Chile, and left the country without producing any, telling them to "stay in your country".

== Discography ==
Year	Title	US chart positions		
Year	Title	Billboard 200	Latin Albums	Latin Rhythm Albums
1998	Gárgolas, Vol. 1 - El Comando Ataca: Release date: June 8, 1998	—	—	—
1999	Gárgolas 2 - El Nuevo Comando, Segundo Ataque: Release date: June 3, 1999	—	—	—
2000	Las 9 Plagas: Release date: June 3, 2000	—	—	—
2001	Gárgolas 3: Release date: July 13, 2001	—	—	—
2003	Las 9 Plagas 2: Release date: 2003	—	—	—
2003	Gárgolas, Vol. 4: Release date: December 9, 2003	—	—	—
2006	Gárgolas 5: The Next Generation: Release date: 2006	181	6	6
2021	Gárgolas Forever: Release date: August 27, 2021	—	—	—

=== Production discography ===
- 2005: Glou
- 2020: Afrodisíaco
