= Héctor & Tito =

Puerto Rican reggaeton duo

- Origin: Puerto Rico
- Genre: Reggaeton
- Years active: 1996–2004
- Labels: VI; Machete; Rimas
- Past members: Héctor el Father; Tito El Bambino

Héctor & Tito were a Puerto Rican reggaeton duo. They are widely regarded as one of the most influential pioneering duos in the history of reggaeton. The duo caught the world's attention and expanded this genre globally, paving the way for artists like Daddy Yankee and Tego Calderón. They are known in the United States for their song "Ay Amor", featuring salsa singer Víctor Manuelle, which was the group's only charting song in that country. They are also known for the songs "Gata Salvaje" (featuring Daddy Yankee and Nicky Jam), "(Baila) Morena" (featuring Glory and Don Omar) and "Amor de Colegio" (featuring Don Omar).

The duo started their career in the 1990s under the name Los Bambinos, after singing with other reggaeton artists. Together, they released several albums and rose to fame in Latin America.

In 2004, the duo announced that they were to disband. Since the split, they have continued with their solo careers. Their friendship remained tense for a time though both have now publicly reconciled. They are individually known as Héctor el Father and Tito El Bambino, who would go on to be two of the most successful acts in Latin music history. Héctor el Father retired in 2008 to become an evangelical pastor in his homeland Puerto Rico, while Tito El Bambino remains active in the music industry.

== History ==
=== Beginnings ===
Efrain Fines (Tito) and Héctor Delgado were born in 1981 and 1979 respectively in Carolina, Puerto Rico. Both artists resided in the neighborhood of Parque Ecuestre and began their artistic pursuits in their teens. Héctor el Father was part of the rap group "Masters of Funk" alongside Rey and Julio Voltio, while Tito El Bambino recorded with various local DJs gaining an appearance in the famous reggaeton series "The Noise vol. 5" which was considered his big break into the music scene. Thanks to local DJs such as Chiclin and Estefano, Tito and Héctor form a friendship which evolved into a duo when Héctor separated from Masters of Funk. After appearances on many compilations from local DJs and producers from Puerto Rico, the duo connected with DJ Goldy and signed to VI Music in order to prepare their first album Violencia Musical, released in 1998. It became a huge commercial and critical success in Puerto Rico, selling over 100,000 copies at the time and turning the duo into one of the most popular music groups on the island.

=== International recognition ===
Over the course of time, the reggaeton genre gained prominence outside of Puerto Rico and despite Héctor & Tito's temporary loss of popularity due to a Christian album which didn't sell well and rap battles against Rubio y Joel and Baby Rasta & Gringo which also affected their sales; by 2002 Héctor & Tito won their lyrical battle against Rubio y Joel and regained their position as one of the most popular acts in Puerto Rico. This was good news for the company Universal Latino which entered in a partnership with VI Music to distribute Héctor & Tito's much anticipated A la Reconquista, which became one of the first widely distributed reggaeton albums during the genre's boom period of 2002-2006. Thanks to international hits such as "Duele (Cuando El Amor Se Va)", "Gata Salvaje" and "Felina", the positive reception of these songs throughout Latin America and the United States made Héctor & Tito protagonists in the expansion of the reggaeton culture alongside artists such as Don Omar, Tego Calderon and the hitmaking production duo Luny Tunes. A la Reconquista also served as a launching pad for the career of Don Omar who was signed to Héctor 'El Father' and VI Music leading to Omar writing many of the songs for the album including songs he was featured on. A la Reconquista is recognized as one of the greatest reggaeton albums of all-time and was both a commercial and critical success winning a Billboard Latin Music Award for best Latin rap album. The live version of the album, La Historia: Live which includes additional live performances of some of the duo's earlier hits was certified Latin platinum by the RIAA in 2003.

=== Disbandment ===
Due to unforeseen pressures from the unexpected success, tensions arose between the fellow artists and both decided to pursue solo ambitions amid an inamicable split. Of these tensions, were Héctor trying to get Tito to leave his Christian beliefs to the side and to dress and act more like a traditional gangster would, with Héctor going to the extent of bringing Tito naked women into the bathroom while Tito was listening to his Christian programs. Another of these strong tensions was Tito wanting to bring the duo's fame outwards worldwide, while Héctor wanted to keep their fame in and around Puerto Rico at most. Héctor changed his name from el Bambino to el Father evolving into a mafioso persona emulating his American hip hop influences such as Notorious B.I.G. and Tupac Shakur. Héctor recorded many successful records and platinum albums such as "Noches De Travesura" feat. Divino, "Mayor Que Yo" featuring various artists, and his solo project The Bad Boy which was certified Latin platinum by the RIAA in 2006. Héctor el Father also had partnerships for his record label Gold Star Music with Roc-A-Fella Records and Machete Music/Universal Latino recording a collaboration with Jay-Z on "Here We Go" from Los Rompe Discotekas, distributed by Roc-La-Familia (Roc-A-Fella's Latino division). Héctor el Father would retire from the music scene in 2008 to pursue his faith in Jesus Christ.

=== Solo careers ===
Tito El Bambino became one of the most popular acts in Latin music and is most well known for the song "El Amor" from the 2009 album El Patrón. Tito would feature alongside many prominent Latin music acts such as Marc Anthony, Ednita Nazario, Zion & Lennox and Wisin & Yandel. He is currently active to the present day and remains one of the most popular Latin acts in the industry. Héctor & Tito have publicly reconciled since their split in 2004.

== Discography ==
=== Studio albums ===
- Violencia Musical (1998)
- Nuevo Milenio (2000)
- A la Reconquista (2002)

=== Compilation albums ===
- Lo De Antes (2002)
- Season Finale 1998-2003 (2005)
- The Ultimate Urban Collection (2007)

=== Live albums ===
- La Historia Live (2003)
