= VI Music =

Puerto Rican record label

- Parent company: Universal Music Group
- Founded: 1997; 28 years ago
- Founder: Mario VI; Juan Vidal
- Distributor(s): Machete Music
- Genre: Reggaeton
- Country of origin: Puerto Rico

VI Music is a Puerto Rican record label specializing in the reggaeton genre, founded by reggaeton producers Mario VI, Álex Gárgolas and Juan Vidal. The record label came to prominence after securing a joint venture with Universal Music Latino and Machete Music. Their albums include gold and platinum productions such as "The Last Don" and "King of Kings" by Don Omar, Barrio Fino by Daddy Yankee, "A la Reconquista" and "La Historia Live" by Héctor & Tito, "Los MVP" by Angel & Khriz and "Sin Límite" by Magnate & Valentino among many others. During the height of their popularity, VI Music had some of the most successful reggaeton acts signed to their label. The company has not released an album since 2009 after most of their artists left or had their contracts sold to Universal Music Latino, most notably Don Omar. Álex Gárgolas left the company and went on to discover and manage Farruko during his first international successes. Mario VI currently hosts his own radio show "La Jungla" in Puerto Rico alongside legendary radio personality El Coyote.

== Selected artists (current and former) ==
- Angel & Khriz
- Héctor & Tito
- Don Omar
- Daddy Yankee
- D.OZi
- Eliel
- Magnate & Valentino
- Mario VI
- Gocho
- Álex Gárgolas
- Echo
- DJ Nelson
- Glory
- Luny Tunes

== Albums released by VI Music ==
- El Cartel (Daddy Yankee) (1997)
- Álex Gárgolas: Gargolas: El Comando Ataca (1998)
- Violencia Musical (Héctor & Tito) (1998)
- Álex Gárgolas: Gargolas 2: El Nuevo Comando - Segundo Ataque (1999)
- Sabor a dulce (Ashley) (1999)
- Álex Gárgolas: Las 9 Plagas (2000)
- El poder de las mujeres (Ashley) (2000)
- Guatauba 2000 (2000)
- Álex Gárgolas: Gargolas III (2001)
- Grayskull: Abusando (2001)
- El Cartel II (Daddy Yankee) (2001)
- Rompiendo el Hielo (Magnate & Valentino) (2002)
- A la Reconquista (Héctor & Tito) (2002)
- El Cangri.com (Daddy Yankee) (2002)
- DJ Joe: Fatal Fantassy Vol. 3 (2002)
- La Historia Live (Héctor & Tito) (2003)
- Luny Tunes: Mas Flow (2003)
- Los Homerun-es (Daddy Yankee) (2003)
- Censurado (Ranking Stone) (2003)
- The Last Don (Don Omar) (2003)
- Barrio Fino (Daddy Yankee) (2004)
- Álex Gárgolas: Las 9 Plagas Vol. 2 (2004)
- The Last Don Live (Don Omar) (2004)
- Eliel: El Que Habla Con Las Manos (2004)
- Ahora le Toca al Cangri! Live (Daddy Yankee) (2005)
- Los Bandoleros (Don Omar) (2005)
- Season Finale (Héctor & Tito) (2005)
- Luny Tunes: Desafio (2005)
- Buddha's Family 2: Desde La Prisión (2005)
- Los Kambumbos: Tierra de Nadie (2005)
- King of Kings (Don Omar) (2006)
- Los Bandoleros Reloaded (Don Omar) (2006)
- Álex Gárgolas: Gargolas 5: The Next Generation (2006)
- Los Rompe Discotekas (Héctor el Father) (2006)
- Progresivo (Magnate & Valentino) (2007)
- Echo: Echo Presenta: Invasión (2007)
- The Bad Boy: The Most Wanted Edition (Héctor el Father) (2007)
- Showtime (Angel & Khriz) (2008)
- Quimica Perfecta (Magnate & Valentino) (2009)
- Da' Take Over (Angel & Khriz) (2010)

== See also ==
- Lists of record labels
