= Don Omar discography =

- Studio albums: 7
- Live albums: 4
- Compilation albums: 5
- Singles: 36
- Video albums: 4
- Music videos: 23
- Featured singles: 12

The discography of Don Omar, a Puerto Rican rapper, consists of seven studio albums, four live albums, three re-release albums, five compilation albums, thirty-six singles (including singles from studio, live, compilation albums and collaborations), four video albums and twenty-seven music videos.

On 2003, Don Omar released his debut album The Last Don including the singles "Dale Don Dale", "Dile" and "Intocable". In the U.S., the album reached number one on the Billboard Top Latin Albums chart, but on the main Billboard 200, it only reached #165. His second album King of Kings was released in 2006. King of Kings is his album of most highest rank to date, reaching number one on the Billboard Top Latin Albums chart and number seven on the Billboard 200. The album had three singles: "Angelito", "Conteo" and "Salió el Sol".

Don Omar released his third studio album, iDon, in 2009, featuring the singles "Virtual Diva", "Sexy Robótica" and "Ciao Bella". In November 2010, Don Omar released the collaborative album titled Meet the Orphans, featuring the promo single "Hasta Abajo", the Worldwide hit "Danza Kuduro" and "Taboo".

== Albums ==
=== Studio albums ===
List of albums, with selected chart positions, sales figures and certifications
Title	Album details	Peak chart positions						Certifications	Sales
Title	Album details	US	US Latin	US Rap	ARG	MEX	SPA	Certifications	Sales
The Last Don	Released: June 17, 2003; Label: VI Music; Formats: CD, digital download	165	2	—	89	—	70	RIAA: Gold	World: 3,000,000; US: 541,000
King of Kings	Released: May 23, 2006; Label: Machete Music; Formats: CD, digital download	7	1	2	9	84	13	RIAA: Gold; SPA: Gold; ARG: Gold	World: 6,000,000; US: 556,000; SPA: 50,000
iDon	Released: April 28, 2009; Label: Universal; Formats: CD, digital download	32	1	9	3	51	31	ARG: Gold	World: 1,500,000; US: 100,000
Meet the Orphans	Released: November 16, 2010; Label: Orfanato Music Group; Formats: CD, digital download	101	2	8	—	47	45		US: 103,000
Don Omar Presents MTO²: New Generation	Released: May 1, 2012; Label: Orfanato Music Group; Formats: CD, digital download	39	1	—	—	—	—		US: 81,900
The Last Don II	Released: June 16, 2015; Label: Orfanato Music Group; Formats: CD, digital download	73	1	6	—	—	81		
The Last Album	Released: December 6, 2019; Label: Machete Music; Formats: CD, digital download	—	—	—	—	—	—		
Forever King	Released: June 15, 2023; Label: Unisono, Saban Music Group; Formats: digital download, streaming	—	40	—	—	—	76	RIAA: Platinum (Latin)	
"—" denotes the album failed to chart or not released

=== Compilation albums ===
List of albums, with selected chart positions, sales figures and certifications
Title	Album details	Peak chart positions			Certifications	Sales
Title	Album details	US	US Latin	US Rap	Certifications	Sales
Los Bandoleros	Released: May 10, 2005; Label: Machete Music; Formats: CD, Digital download	55	2	—		
Da Hitman Presents: Reggaetón Latino	Released: December 6, 2005; Label: Machete Music; Formats: CD, Digital download	61	1	12		US: 200,000
Los Bandoleros: Reloaded	Released: November 21, 2006; Label: Machete Music; Formats: CD, Digital download	—	25	—		
Don Omar Presenta: El Pentágono	Released: March 27, 2007; Label: Machete Music; Formats: CD, Digital download	164	7	—	RIAA: Platinum (Latin)	
El Pentágono: The Return	Released: June 3, 2008; Label: Machete Music; Formats: CD, Digital download	—	—	—		
"—" denotes the album failed to chart or not released

=== Live albums ===
List of live albums, with selected chart positions
Title	Album details	Peak chart positions					Certifications	Sales
Title	Album details	US	US Latin	US Rap	US Trop.	ARG	Certifications	Sales
The Last Don Live	Released: June 8, 2004; Label: VI Music; Formats: CD, Digital download	84	2	1	1	—	RIAA: 2× Platinum (Latin)	World: 1,000,000; US: 200,000
King of Kings: Live	Released: October 23, 2007; Label: Machete Music; Formats: CD, Digital download	—	15	—	—	71		
"—" denotes the album failed to chart or not released

=== Video albums ===
Title	DVD details	Certifications (sales threshold)
The Last Don: Live	Live/DVD album; Released: September 14, 2004; Formats: DVD	ARG: Platinum
The Don Omar All Star Video Collection	Video compilation; Released: November 8, 2005; Formats: DVD	
King of Kings: Live	Live/DVD album; Released: October 23, 2007; Formats: DVD	ARG: Platinum
Best of the Best Video Collection	Video compilation; Released: December 11, 2007; Formats: DVD	

== Singles ==
=== As lead artist ===
List of singles as lead artist, with selected chart positions and certifications, showing year released and album name
Title	Year	Peak chart positions										Certifications	Album
Title	Year	AUT	GER	NL	SPA	SWI	US Latin	US Latin Rhy.	US Trop.	US Latin Pop	US	Certifications	Album
"Dale Don Dale" (featuring Glory)	2003	—	—	—	1	—	39	19	21	—	—		The Last Don
"Dile"	2004	—	—	—	—	48	47	—	8	37	—		The Last Don
"Intocable"	2004	—	—	—	—	—	—	—	38	—	—		The Last Don
"Pobre Diabla"	2004	—	—	—	—	—	17	5	2	16	—		The Last Don: Live
"Aunque Te Fuiste"	2004	—	—	—	—	—	—	—	21	—	—		The Last Don: Live
"Bandoleros" (featuring Tego Calderón)	2005	—	—	—	—	—	18	10	12	—	—		Los Bandoleros
"Donqueo"	2005	—	—	—	—	—	23	25	3	16	—		Los Bandoleros
"Reggaetón Latino"	2005	—	—	76	—	100	4	4	1	20	— (Note: "Reggaetón Latino" did not enter the Billboard Hot 100, but peaked at number one on the Bubbling Under Hot 100 Singles chart.)		Da Hitman Presents Reggaetón Latino
"Dale Don Dale" (Remix) (featuring Fabolous)	2005	—	—	—	—	—	39	—	—	—	—		Da Hitman Presents Reggaetón Latino
"Entre Tú y Yo"	2005	—	—	—	—	—	—	—	40	—	—		Da Hitman Presents Reggaetón Latino
"Angelito"	2006	—	—	—	—	—	1	1	1	24	93	RIAA: Gold	King of Kings
"Conteo" (featuring Juelz Santana)	2006	—	—	—	—	—	—	36	—	—	—		King of Kings
"Salió el Sol"	2006	—	—	—	—	—	13	3	19	—	—		King of Kings
"Anda Sola"	2006	—	—	—	—	—	48	17	27	—	—		Los Bandoleros Reloaded
"My Space" (featuring Wisin & Yandel)	2007	—	—	—	—	—	20	3	—	—	—		Los Bandoleros Reloaded
"Calm My Nerves" (featuring Rell)	2007	—	—	—	—	—	—	15	—	—	—		Don Omar Presenta: El Pentágono
"Ayer La Vi"	2007	—	—	—	—	—	8	2	6	—	—		King of Kings: Live
"Canción de Amor"	2007	—	—	—	—	—	39	10	28	—	—		King of Kings: Live
"Virtual Diva"	2009	—	—	—	11	—	10	1	3	19	— (Note: "Virtual Diva" did not enter the Billboard Hot 100, but peaked at number 25 on the Bubbling Under Hot 100 Singles chart.)	PROMUSICAE: Gold	iDon
"Sexy Robótica"	2009	—	—	—	—	—	20	3	6	26	—		iDon
"Ciao Bella"	2009	—	—	—	—	—	39	10	18	35	—		iDon
"Danza Kuduro" (featuring Lucenzo)	2011	1	1	1	1	1	1	1	1	1	82	RIAA: 5× Platinum; BVMI: 7× Gold; FIMI: 2× Platinum; PROMUSICAE: 2× Platinum; IFPI SWI: Platinum	Don Omar Presents: Meet the Orphans
"Taboo"	2011	—	—	—	36	—	1	1	1	2	97		Don Omar Presents: Meet the Orphans
"Dutty Love" (featuring Natti Natasha)	2012	—	—	—	—	—	1	1	1	1	— (Note: "Dutty Love" did not enter the Billboard Hot 100, but peaked at number 14 on the Bubbling Under Hot 100 Singles chart.)		Meet the Orphans 2: New Generation
"Hasta Que Salga el Sol"	2012	—	—	—	19	—	1	1	5	1	— (Note: "Hasta Que Salga el Sol" did not enter the Billboard Hot 100, but peaked at number five on the Bubbling Under Hot 100 Singles chart.)		Meet the Orphans 2: New Generation
"Ella No Sigue Modas" (featuring Juan Magan)	2012	—	—	—	—	—	18	7	—	14	—		Meet the Orphans 2: New Generation
"Zumba"	2012	—	—	—	—	62	2	1	3	1	—		Meet the Orphans 2: New Generation
"Feeling Hot"	2013	—	—	—	—	—	22	2	39	—	—		Non-album single
"Guaya Guaya"	2014	—	—	—	66	—	29	5	2	—	—	PROMUSICAE: Gold	The Last Don 2
"Soledad"	2014	—	—	—	11	—	11	1	8	7	—	PROMUSICAE: Platinum	The Last Don 2
"Pura Vida"	2014	—	—	—	—	—	15	1	24	—	—		Non-album single
"Perdido en tus Ojos" (featuring Natti Natasha)	2015	—	—	—	22		13	—	—	—	—	PROMUSICAE: Platinum	The Last Don 2
"Te Quiero Pa' Mi" (featuring Zion & Lennox)	2016	—	—	—	19	—	12	1	14	9	—	RIAA: Gold (Latin); PROMUSICAE: Platinum	King of Kings 10th Anniversary (Remastered)
"Ramayama" (featuring Farruko)	2019	—	—	—	—	—	43	—	—	—	—		The Last Album
"Vacilón"	2019	—	—	—	—	—	—	20	—	—	—		The Last Album
"No Te Vayas" (featuring Alexis & Fido)	2019	—	—	—	—	—	—	10	—	—	—		The Last Album
"Pa' Romperla" (with Bad Bunny)	2020	—	—	—	1	—	—	—	—	—	—	RIAA: 4× Platinum (Latin)	Las Que No Iban a Salir
"El amor es una moda" (with Alcover and Juan Magán)	2020	—	—	—	—	—	—	—	—	—	—		Non-album singles
"Navidad Pa' La Calle"	2020	—	—	—	—	—	—	—	—	—	—		Non-album singles
"Flow HP" (with Residente)	2021	—	—	—	—	—	—	—	—	—	—	RIAA: Gold (Latin)	Forever King
"Se Menea" (with Nio García)	2021	—	—	—	74	—	17	3	1	—	—	RIAA: 3× Platinum (Latin)	Forever King
"Sincero"	2022	—	—	—	—	—	—	—	—	—	—	RIAA: Platinum (Latin)	Forever King
"Soy Yo" (with Wisin and Gente de Zona)	2022	—	—	—	—	—	35	—	1	—	—		Forever King
"Let's Get Crazy" (with Lil Jon)	2022	—	—	—	—	—	—	—	—	—	—		Forever King
"Good Girl" (with Akon)	2022	—	—	—	—	—	—	—	—	—	—		Forever King
"Agradecido"	2022	—	—	—	—	—	—	—	—	—	—		Forever King
"Entrégame Tu Amor" (with Randy)	2022	—	—	—	—	—	—	—	—	—	—		Non-album single
"Bandidos" (with Cosculluela)	2023	—	—	—	—	—	—	—	—	—	—		Forever King
"Podemos Repetirlo" (with Chencho Corleone)	2023	—	—	—	—	—	—	24	—	—	—		Forever King
"Sandunga" (with Wisin and Yandel)	2023	—	—	—	—	—	—	—	—	—	—		TBA
"—" denotes a recording that did not chart or was not released in that territory.

=== As featured artist ===
List of singles as featured artist, with selected chart positions, showing year released and album name
Title	Year	Peak chart positions					Album
Title	Year	US	US Latin	US Rhy.	US Trop.	US Latin Pop	Album
"Gata Gangster" (Daddy Yankee featuring Don Omar)	2003	—	—	—	—	—	Los Homerun-es
"Ella y Yo" (Aventura featuring Don Omar)	2005	97	2	1	1	32	God's Project
"Scandalous" (Cuban Link featuring Don Omar)	2005	—	45	—	—	—	Chain Reaction
"Noche De Adrenalina" (Pilar Montenegro featuring Don Omar)	2006	—	—	—	13	—	Pilar & Co.-South Beach
"Chillin'" (Tego Calderón featuring Don Omar)	2006	—	44	—	8	—	The Underdog/El Subestimado
"Los Hombres Tienen La Culpa" (Gilberto Santa Rosa featuring Don Omar)	2006	—	39	—	1	—	Los Cocorocos
"Nunca Habia Llorado Asi" (Víctor Manuelle featuring Don Omar)	2007	—	47	—	1	—	Decisión Unánime
"Tigi Tigi" (Hakim featuring Don Omar)	2007	—	—	—	—	—	Tigi Tigi
"Dentro de Mí" (Chino & Nacho featuring Don Omar)	2008	—	—	—	—	—	Época de Reyes
"Run the Show" (Kat Deluna featuring Don Omar)	2008	—	—	—	38	—	9 Lives
"Todo Lo Que Soy" (Marcy Place featuring Don Omar)	2008	—	31	—	—	—	B from Marcy Place
"Sin Contrato" (Maluma featuring Don Omar and Wisin)	2016	—	7	—	8	2	Pretty Boy, Dirty Boy
"La Fila" (Luny Tunes featuring Don Omar, Sharlene Taulé and Maluma)	2016	—	—	—	—	—	Non-album single
"Nunca Me Olvides" (Remix) (Yandel featuring Don Omar)	2017	—	—	—	—	—	Non-album singles
"Vacaciones" (Remix) (Wisin featuring Zion & Lennox, Tito "El Bambino", and Don Omar)	2017	—	—	—	—	—	Non-album singles
"Ámame o Mátame" (Ivy Queen featuring Don Omar)	2017	—	48	19	—	—	The Queen Is Here
"—" denotes a recording that did not chart or was not released in that territory.

=== Promotional singles ===
List of promotional singles, with selected chart positions, showing year released and album name
Title	Year	Peak chart positions				Album
Title	Year	US Latin	US Rhy.	US Trop.	US Latin Pop	Album
"Luna"	2004	—	—	—	—	Gargolas 10th Anniversary Collection
"Belly Danza" (featuring Beenie Man)	2007	—	—	—	—	King of Kings
"Adiós"	2007	—	—	—	—	King of Kings
"Blue Zone"	2009	—	—	—	—	iDon
"Hasta Abajo"	2009	9	1	2	12	Don Omar Presents: Meet the Orphans
"—" denotes a recording that did not chart or was not released in that territory.

== Other charted songs ==
List of songs, with selected chart positions and certifications, showing year released and album name
Year	Title	Peak chart positions	Album
Year	Title	US Trop.	Album
2006	"Cuentale"	17	King of Kings
2007	"Nadie Como Tú" (Wisin & Yandel featuring Don Omar)	28	Los Vaqueros
2007	"La Pared" (Wisin & Yandel featuring Don Omar)	32	Los Vaqueros Wild Wild Mixes
2011	"Good Looking"	36	Don Omar Presents: Meet the Orphans

== Music videos ==
=== As lead artist ===
List of music videos, showing year released and director
Title	Year	Director(s)
"Aunque te Fuiste"	2003	Louis Martinez
"Dile"	2004	Juan Basanta
"Pobre Diabla"	2004	Juan Basanta
"Bandoleros" (featuring Tego Calderón)	2005	Kacho Lopez & Carlos Pérez
"Donqueo"	2005	Kacho Lopez & Carlos Pérez
"Reggaetón Latino"	2005	Brian Kushner & Ben De Jesus
"Reggaetón Latino (Chosen Few Remix)" (featuring Fat Joe, N.O.R.E. and LDA)	2005	Brian Kushner & Ben De Jesus
"Luna"	2006	Louis Martínez
"Tamborilero"	2006	Louis Martínez
"Angelito"	2006	Louis Martínez
"Salió el Sol"	2006	Ron Jaramillo
"Belly Danza"	2006	Ron Jaramillo
"Conteo"	2006	Jessy Terrero
"Adiós"	2007	David Impelluso
"Calm My Nerves" (featuring Rell)	2007	David Impelluso
"Canción De Amor"	2007	Carlos Pérez
"Virtual Diva"	2009	Carlos Pérez
"Sexy Robótica"	2009	Carlos Pérez
"Danza Kuduro" (featuring Lucenzo)	2010	Carlos Pérez
"Hasta Abajo"	2010	Carlos Pérez
"Huérfano De Amor" (featuring Syko)	2011	Alejandro Santiago Ciena
"Taboo"	2011	Marlón Peña
"Pura Vida"	2014	Jessy Terrero

=== As featured artist ===
List of music videos, showing year released and director
Title	Year	Director(s)
"Seguroski/Gata Gangster" (Daddy Yankee featuring Don Omar)	2003	David Impelluso
"Baila Morena/Amor De Colegio" (Héctor & Tito featuring Don Omar and Glory)	2003	Louis Martínez
"Ella y Yo" (Aventura featuring Don Omar)	2005	Ulysses Terrero
"Scandalous" (Cuban Link featuring Don Omar)	2005	Louis Martínez
"Chillin'" (Tego Calderón featuring Don Omar)	2006	Scott Franklin
"Dentro de Mí" (Chino & Nacho featuring Don Omar)	2008	Fran Gutiérrez "El Cuervo
"Run the Show" (Kat DeLuna featuring Don Omar)	2008	Ray Kay
"Todo Lo Que Soy" (Marcy Place featuring Don Omar)	2008	Edwin Decena
