= List of awards and nominations received by Don Omar =

Don Omar awards and nominations
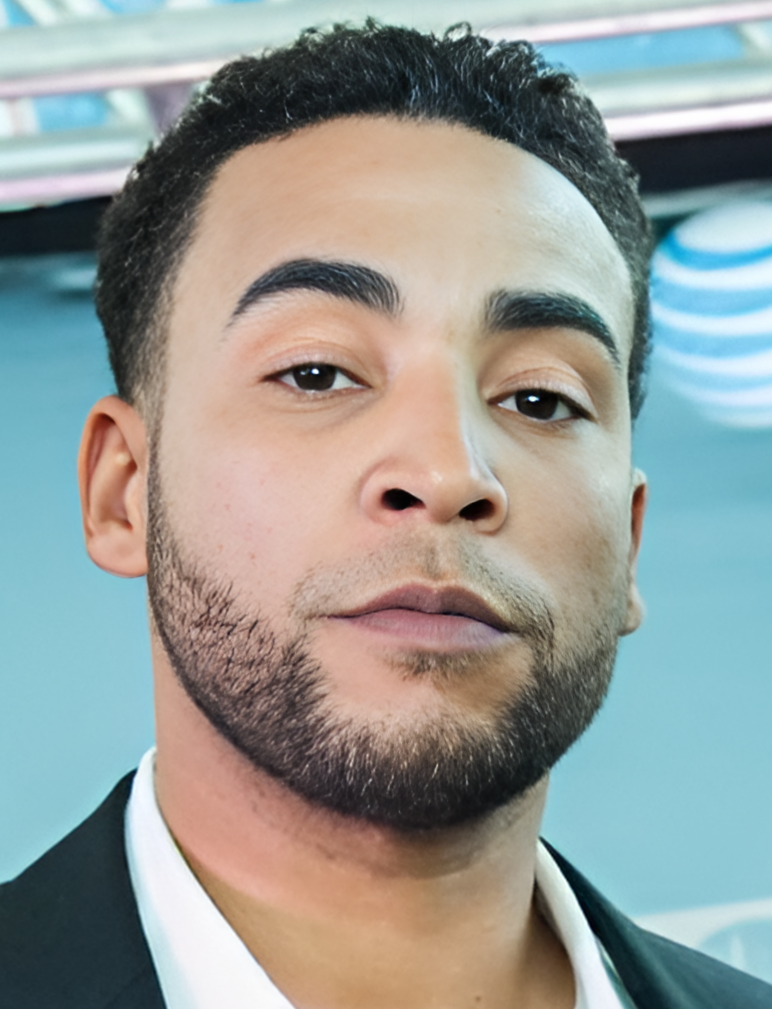
- Don Omar in 2015 promoting The Kingdom Tour.
Awards and nominations
Award	Wins	Nominations
Latin Grammy Awards	2	11
Billboard Latin Music Awards	17	23
Billboard Music Awards	1	4
Lo Nuestro Awards	3	19
Viña del Mar International Song Festival Awards	8	-
Guinness World Records	1	-
International Dance Music Awards	-	4
American Music Awards	-	2
Premios People en Español	-	2
MTV Video Music Awards	-	2
Los Premios MTV Latinoamérica	-	1

Totals (Note: Certain award groups do not simply award one winner. They acknowledge several different recipients, have runners-up, and have third place. Since this is a specific recognition and is different from losing an award, runner-up mentions are considered wins in this award tally. For simplification and to avoid errors, each award in this list has been presumed to have had a prior nomination.)
- Wins: 40
- Nominations: 90

Puerto Rican rapper Don Omar has won 40 awards from 90 nominations, being one of the most successful artists of the genre. He has been nominated for 13 Latin Grammy Awards, 23 Billboard Latin Music Awards, 4 Billboard Music Awards, 19 Lo Nuestro Awards, 4 International Dance Music Awards, 2 American Music Awards, 2 Premios People en Español, 2 MTV Video Music Awards and 1 Premio MTV Latinoamérica. He has received 2 Latin Grammy Awards, 17 Billboard Latin Music Awards, 1 Billboard Music Award, 3 Lo Nuestro Awards, 8 Viña del Mar International Song Festival Awards and 1 Guinness World Record.

Rivera was born and raised in Carolina, Puerto Rico, the oldest son of William Landrón and Luz Antonia Rivera. From an early age, he showed interest in the music of Vico C and Brewley MC. During his youth, he became an active member of a Protestant church, Iglesia Evangélica Restauración en Cristo in Bayamón where he occasionally offered sermons. However, after four years, he left the church to dedicate himself to singing. Although his base genre is reggaeton, he also took other roots in latin pop and electropop since 2008.

He released 7 studio albums between 2003 and 2018, including the Billboard Latin Music Award winner King of Kings (2006) for the Reggaeton Album of the Year. Rivera was also responsible for the production of his 4 collaboration albums, including the Latin Grammy Award winner Meet the Orphans 2: New Generation (2012) for Best Urban Music Album. The artist made record in the history for Billboard. The artist earned a Guinness World Record in 2011 for the Spanish-language YouTube video with the most views.

== Latin Grammy Awards ==
Year	Recipient	Award	Result	Ref.
2005	The Last Don Live	Best Urban Music Album	Nominated	
2006	King of Kings	Best Urban Album of the Year	Nominated	
2007	"No Sé De Ella (My Space)" (featuring Wisin & Yandel)	Best Urban Song	Nominated	
2009	iDon	Best Urban Music Album	Nominated	
2009	"Sexy Robotica"	Best Urban Song	Nominated	
2010	"Hasta Abajo"	Best Urban Song	Nominated	
2011	Meet The Orphans	Best Urban Music Album	Nominated	
2011	"Danza Kuduro" (featuring Lucenzo)	Best Urban Song	Nominated	
2012	"Dutty Love" (featuring Natti Natasha)	Best Urban Song	Nominated	
2012	"Hasta Que Salga el Sol"	Best Urban Song	Won	
2012	Meet The Orphans 2: New Generation	Best Urban Music Album	Won	
2014	"Pura Vida"	Best Urban Music Album	Nominated	
2015	The Last Don II	Best Urban Music Album	Nominated	
2021	El Amor Es Una Moda (with Alcover, Juan Magán)	Best Urban Fusion/Performance	Nominated	

== Billboard Latin Music Awards ==
Year	Recipient	Award	Result	Ref.
2005	The Last Don Live	Reggaeton Album of the Year	Nominated	
2006	Da Hitman Presents Reggaeton Latino	Reggaeton Album of the Year	Nominated	
2006	Himself	Songwriter of the Year	Nominated	
2006	"Ella y Yo" (featuring Aventura)	Tropical Airplay Song of the Year, Duo or Group	Won	
2007	King of Kings	Reggaeton Album of the Year	Won	
2007	Himself	Top Latin Albums Artist of the Year	Nominated	
2008	"Ayer La Vi"	Reggaeton Song of the Year	Nominated	
2010	Himself	Tropical Airplay Artist of the Year, Male	Nominated	
2011	"Danza Kuduro" (featuring Lucenzo)	Hot Latin Song of the Year, Vocal Event	Nominated	
2011	"Danza Kuduro" (featuring Lucenzo)	Latin Rhythm Airplay Song of the Year	Won	
2011	Himself	Latin Rhythm Airplay Artist of the Year, Solo	Nominated	
2011	Meet The Orphans	Latin Rhythm Album of the Year	Nominated	
2011	Himself	Latin Rhythm Albums Artist of the Year, Solo	Nominated	
2011	Himself	Latin Social Artist of the Year	Nominated	
2012	"Danza Kuduro" (featuring Lucenzo)	Hot Latin Song of the Year	Won	
2012	"Danza Kuduro" (featuring Lucenzo)	Hot Latin Song of the Year, Vocal Event	Won	
2012	"Danza Kuduro" (featuring Lucenzo)	Digital Song of the Year	Won	
2012	"Taboo"	Hot Latin Song of the Year	Nominated	
2012	"Taboo"	Airplay Song of the Year	Won	
2012	"Taboo"	Latin Pop Airplay Song of the Year	Won	
2012	Himself	Hot Latin Songs Artist of the Year, Male	Nominated	
2012	Himself	Latin Pop Airplay Artist of the Year, Solo	Won	
2013	Himself	Latin Artist of the Year	Nominated	
2013	"Dutty Love" (featuring Natti Natasha)	Hot Latin Song of the Year	Won	
2013	"Dutty Love" (featuring Natti Natasha)	Hot Latin Song of the Year, Vocal Event	Won	
2013	"Dutty Love" (featuring Natti Natasha)	Airplay Song of the Year	Won	
2013	"Dutty Love" (featuring Natti Natasha)	Digital Song of the Year	Won	
2013	Himself	Hot Latin Songs Artist of the Year, Male	Won	
2013	"Danza Kuduro" (featuring Lucenzo)	Digital Song of the Year	Nominated	
2013	Himself	Top Latin Albums Artist of the Year, Male	Nominated	
2013	Meet The Orphans 2: New Generation	Digital Album of the Year	Nominated	
2014	"Zumba"	Latin Rhythm Song of the Year	Nominated	
2014	Himself	Latin Rhythm Songs Artist of the Year, Solo	Won	
2014	Meet The Orphans 2: New Generation	Latin Rhythm Album of the Year	Nominated	
2014	Himself	Latin Rhythm Albums Artist of the Year, Solo	Nominated	
2015	Himself	Latin Rhythm Songs Artist of the Year, Solo	Nominated	
2015	The Last Don ll	Latin Rhythm Album of the Year	Nominated	
2016	Himself	Latin Rhythm Albums, Artist of the Year	Nominated	
2016	Himself	Industry Leader	Won	
2022	"Se Menea" (with Nio Garcia)	Tropical Song The Year	Won	

== Billboard Music Awards ==
Year	Recipient	Award	Result	Ref.
2012	"Danza Kuduro" (featuring Lucenzo)	Latin Song of the Year	Won	
2012	"Taboo"	Latin Song of the Year	Nominated	
2013	Himself	Top Latin Artist	Nominated	
2013	"Dutty Love" (featuring Natti Natasha)	Top Latin Song	Nominated	
2013	"Hasta Que Salga El Sol"	Top Latin Song	Nominated	

== Lo Nuestro Awards ==
Year	Recipient	Award	Result	Ref.
2005	Himself	Urban Artist of the Year	Won	
2005	The Last Don Live	Urban Album of the Year	Nominated	
2006	Himself	Urban Artist of the Year	Nominated	
2006	"Reggaeton Latino"	Urban Song of the Year	Nominated	
2007	"Angelito"	Best Latin Music Video	Won	
2007	Himself	Urban Artist of the Year	Nominated	
2008	Himself	Urban Artist of the Year	Nominated	
2009	King of Kings Live	Urban Album of the Year	Nominated	
2009	Himself	Urban Artist of the Year	Nominated	
2010	Himself	Urban Artist of the Year	Nominated	
2011	"Hasta Abajo"	Urban Song of the Year	Nominated	
2011	Himself	Urban Artist of the Year	Nominated	
2012	"Taboo"	Urban Song of the Year	Won	
2012	Meet The Orphans	Urban Album of the Year	Nominated	
2012	Himself	Urban Artist of the Year	Nominated	
2013	"Dutty Love" (featuring Natti Natasha)	Urban Song of the Year	Nominated	
2013	"Dutty Love" (featuring Natti Natasha)	Collaboration of the Year	Nominated	
2013	"Hasta Que Salga El Sol"	Urban Song of the Year	Nominated	
2013	Meet The Orphans 2: New Generation	Urban Album of the Year	Nominated	
2013	Himself	Urban Artist of the Year	Nominated	
2014	"Zumba"	Urban Song of the Year	Nominated	
2015	Himself	Urban Artist of the Year	Nominated	
2016	Himself	Urban Artist of the Year	Nominated	
2016	"Soledad"	Urban Song of the Year	Nominated	
2016	The Last Don II	Urban Album of the Year	Nominated	
2017	"Mayor Que Yo 3" (with Luny Tunes, Daddy Yankee, Wisin & Yandel)	Urban Collaboration of the Year	Nominated	
2023	Himself	Male Urban Artist of the Year	Nominated	

== Viña del Mar International Song Festival Awards ==
Year	Recipient	Award	Result	Ref.
2007	Himself	Antorcha de Plata	Won	
2007	Himself	Antorcha de Oro	Won	
2007	Himself	Gaviota de Plata	Won	
2010	Himself	Antorcha de Plata	Won	
2010	Himself	Antorcha de Oro	Won	
2010	Himself	Gaviota de Plata	Won	
2016	Himself	Gaviota de Plata	Won	
2016	Himself	Gaviota de Oro	Won	

== International Dance Music Awards ==
Year	Recipient	Award	Result	Ref.
2007	"Dale Don Dale"	Best Latin/Reggaeton Track	Nominated	
2011	"Danza Kuduro" (featuring Lucenzo)	Best Latin/Reggaeton Track	Nominated	
2013	"Dutty Love" (featuring Natti Natasha)	Best Latin Dance Track	Nominated	
2015	"Pura Vida"	Best Latin Dance Track	Nominated	

== American Music Awards ==
Year	Recipient	Award	Result	Ref.
2006	Himself	Favorite Latin Artist	Nominated	
2012	Himself	Favorite Latin Artist	Nominated	

== Premios People en Español ==
Year	Recipient	Award	Result	Ref.
2012	"Dutty Love" (featuring Natti Natasha)	Song of the Year	Nominated	
2012	Meet The Orphans 2: New Generation	Album of the Year	Nominated	

== MTV Video Music Awards ==
Year	Recipient	Award	Result	Ref.
2011	Himself	Best Latin Artist	Nominated	
2013	Himself	Best Latin Artist	Nominated	

== Premios MTV Latinoamérica ==
Year	Recipient	Award	Result	Ref.
2007	Himself	Best Urban Artist	Nominated	

== Premios Tu Música Urbano ==
Year	Recipient	Award	Result	Ref.
2020	The Last Album	Album of the Year - Male	Nominated	
2022	Himself	Top Artist - Male		
2022	"Se Menea" (with Nio Garcia)	Top Song - Tropical Urban		
2022	"Se Menea" (with Nio Garcia)	Video of the Year		
2023	Himself	The Best Comeback		

== Guinness World Records ==
Year	Recipient	Award	Result	Ref.
2011	"Danza Kuduro" (featuring Lucenzo)	YouTube video in Spanish with more views	Won	
