= List of Billboard Latin Rhythm Airplay number ones of 2022 =

The Billboard Latin Rhythm Airplay is a chart that ranks the best-performing Spanish-language Latin rhythm singles in the United States. Published by Billboard magazine, the data is compiled by Nielsen SoundScan based collectively on each single's weekly airplay.

== Chart history ==
Key
†	Indicates number 1 on Billboard's year-end Latin rhythm chart

Issue date	Song	Artist	Ref
January 1	"Una Nota"	J Balvin	
January 8	"Emojis de Corazones"	Wisin, Jhayco, Ozuna featuring Los Legendarios	
January 15	"Se Menea"	Don Omar and Nio Garcia	
January 22	"Se Menea"	Don Omar and Nio Garcia	
January 29	"El Incomprendido"	Farruko, Victor Cardenas & DJ Adoni	
February 5	"Ley Seca"	Jhayco and Anuel AA	
February 12	"Sejodioto"	Karol G	
February 19	"Se Menea"	Don Omar and Nio Garcia	
February 26	"Todo de Ti"	Rauw Alejandro	
March 5	"Cúrame"	Rauw Alejandro	
March 12	"Todo de Ti"	Rauw Alejandro	
March 19	"Recordar"	Wisin & Yandel	
March 26	"Mamiii" †	Becky G and Karol G	
April 2	"SG"	DJ Snake, Ozuna, Megan Thee Stallion and Lisa	
April 9	"Mamiii" †	Becky G and Karol G	
April 16	"Sigue"	J Balvin and Ed Sheeran	
April 23	"Nicky Jam"	Nicky Jam	
April 30	"Mamiii" †	Becky G and Karol G	
May 7	"Te Felicito"	Shakira and Rauw Alejandro	
May 14	"Mamiii" †	Becky G and Karol G	
May 21	"Medallo"	Blessd, Justin Quiles, Lenny Tavarez	
May 28	"Mamiii" †	Becky G and Karol G	
June 4	"Deprimida"	Ozuna	
June 11	"Mamiii" †	Becky G and Karol G	
June 18	"Mamiii" †	Becky G and Karol G	
June 25	"Mamiii" †	Becky G and Karol G	
July 2	"Desesperados"	Rauw Alejandro and Chencho Corleone	
July 9	"Mamiii" †	Becky G and Karol G	
July 16	"Mamiii" †	Becky G and Karol G	
July 23	"Buenos Días"	Wisin and Camilo	
July 30	"Moscow Mule"	Bad Bunny	
August 6	"Remix"	Daddy Yankee]	
August 13	"Sensual Bebe"	Jhayco	
August 20	"Me Porto Bonito"	Bad Bunny and Chencho Corleone	
August 27	"Me Porto Bonito"	Bad Bunny and Chencho Corleone	
September 3	"Mayor Que Usted"	Natti Natasha, Daddy Yankee,Wisin & Yandel	
September 10	"Me Porto Bonito"	Bad Bunny and Chencho Corleone	
September 17	"Me Porto Bonito"	Bad Bunny and Chencho Corleone	
September 24	"Me Porto Bonito"	Bad Bunny and Chencho Corleone	
October 1	"Tití Me Preguntó"	Bad Bunny	
October 8	"Me Porto Bonito"	Bad Bunny and Chencho Corleone	
October 15	"Junio"	Maluma	
October 22	"Somos Iguales"	Ozuna, Tokischa featuring Louchie Lou & Michie One	
October 29	"Quevedo: Bzrp Music Sessions, Vol. 52"	Bizarrap and Quevedo	
November 5	"Quevedo: Bzrp Music Sessions, Vol. 52"	Bizarrap and Quevedo	
November 12	"Quevedo: Bzrp Music Sessions, Vol. 52"	Bizarrap and Quevedo	
November 19	"Quevedo: Bzrp Music Sessions, Vol. 52"	Bizarrap and Quevedo	
November 26	"Quevedo: Bzrp Music Sessions, Vol. 52"	Bizarrap and Quevedo	
December 3	"Quevedo: Bzrp Music Sessions, Vol. 52"	Bizarrap and Quevedo	
December 10	"Quevedo: Bzrp Music Sessions, Vol. 52"	Bizarrap and Quevedo	
December 17	"Quevedo: Bzrp Music Sessions, Vol. 52"	Bizarrap and Quevedo	
December 24	"Me Porto Bonito"	Bad Bunny and Chencho Corleone	
December 31	"Me Porto Bonito"	Bad Bunny and Chencho Corleone	
