= List of Billboard Latin Rhythm Airplay number ones of 2017 =

The Billboard Latin Rhythm Airplay is a chart that ranks the best-performing Spanish-language Latin rhythm singles in the United States. Published by Billboard magazine, the data is compiled by Nielsen SoundScan based collectively on each single's weekly airplay.

== Chart history ==
Key
†	Indicates number 1 on Billboard's year-end Latin rhythm chart

Issue date	Song	Artist	Ref
January 7	"Chantaje"	Shakira featuring Maluma	
January 14	"Chantaje"	Shakira featuring Maluma	
January 21	"Te Quiero Pa' Mí"	Don Omar and Zion & Lennox	
January 28	"Te Quiero Pa' Mí"	Don Omar and Zion & Lennox	
February 4	"Te Quiero Pa' Mí"	Don Omar and Zion & Lennox	
February 11	"Sin Contrato"	Maluma featuring Fifth Harmony or Don Omar and Wisin	
February 18	"El Amante"	Nicky Jam	
February 25	"El Amante"	Nicky Jam	
March 4	"Despacito" †	Luis Fonsi and Daddy Yankee	
March 11	"Despacito" †	Luis Fonsi and Daddy Yankee	
March 18	"Despacito" †	Luis Fonsi and Daddy Yankee	
March 25	"Despacito" †	Luis Fonsi and Daddy Yankee	
April 1	"Despacito" †	Luis Fonsi and Daddy Yankee	
April 8	"Despacito" †	Luis Fonsi and Daddy Yankee	
April 15	"Súbeme la Radio"	Enrique Iglesias featuring Descemer Bueno, Zion & Lennox or Sean Paul	
April 22	"Despacito" †	Luis Fonsi and Daddy Yankee featuring Justin Bieber	
April 29	"Despacito" †	Luis Fonsi and Daddy Yankee featuring Justin Bieber	
May 6	"Despacito" †	Luis Fonsi and Daddy Yankee featuring Justin Bieber	
May 13	"Despacito" †	Luis Fonsi and Daddy Yankee featuring Justin Bieber	
May 20	"Despacito" †	Luis Fonsi and Daddy Yankee featuring Justin Bieber	
May 27	"Despacito" †	Luis Fonsi and Daddy Yankee featuring Justin Bieber	
June 3	"Despacito" †	Luis Fonsi and Daddy Yankee featuring Justin Bieber	
June 10	"Despacito" †	Luis Fonsi and Daddy Yankee featuring Justin Bieber	
June 17	"Despacito" †	Luis Fonsi and Daddy Yankee featuring Justin Bieber	
June 24	"Despacito" †	Luis Fonsi and Daddy Yankee featuring Justin Bieber	
July 1	"Despacito" †	Luis Fonsi and Daddy Yankee featuring Justin Bieber	
July 8	"Despacito" †	Luis Fonsi and Daddy Yankee featuring Justin Bieber	
July 15	"Despacito" †	Luis Fonsi and Daddy Yankee featuring Justin Bieber	
July 22	"Despacito" †	Luis Fonsi and Daddy Yankee featuring Justin Bieber	
July 29	"Felices Los 4"	Maluma	
August 5	"Felices Los 4"	Maluma	
August 12	"Felices Los 4"	Maluma	
August 19	"Felices Los 4"	Maluma	
August 26	"Felices Los 4"	Maluma	
September 2	"Felices Los 4"	Maluma	
September 9	"Felices Los 4"	Maluma	
September 16	"Mi Gente"	J Balvin & Willy William	
September 23	"Mi Gente"	J Balvin & Willy William	
September 30	"Mi Gente"	J Balvin & Willy William	
October 7	"Como Antes"	Yandel featuring Wisin	
October 14	"Como Antes"	Yandel featuring Wisin	
October 21	"Mi Gente"	J Balvin and Willy William featuring Beyoncé	
October 28	"Mi Gente"	J Balvin and Willy William featuring Beyoncé	
November 4	"Mi Gente"	J Balvin and Willy William featuring Beyoncé	
November 11	"Mi Gente"	J Balvin and Willy William featuring Beyoncé	
November 18	"Mi Gente"	J Balvin and Willy William featuring Beyoncé	
November 25	"Mi Gente"	J Balvin and Willy William featuring Beyoncé	
December 2	"Mi Gente"	J Balvin and Willy William featuring Beyoncé	
December 9	"Mi Gente"	J Balvin and Willy William featuring Beyoncé	
December 16	"Mi Gente"	J Balvin and Willy William featuring Beyoncé	
December 23	"Perro Fiel"	Shakira featuring Nicky Jam	
December 30	"Perro Fiel"	Shakira featuring Nicky Jam	
