= King of Kings World Tour =

2006–07 concert tour by Don Omar

- Tour by Don Omar
- Location: Europe; North America; South America
- Associated album: King of Kings
- Start date: July 19, 2006
- End date: October 12, 2007
- Legs: 4
- No. of shows: 36

Don Omar concert chronology
- The Last Don Tour (2003–2004); King of Kings World Tour; IDon Tour (2009–2010)

The King of Kings World Tour is the name of the world tour by reggaeton singer Don Omar to promote his second studio album King of Kings. During the concerts in Puerto Rico it was recorded and later released as the CD and DVD King of Kings: Live.

== Background ==
As of 2006, having sold over 1 million copies of his first 2 albums. The Last Don and The Last Don Live, including 340,000 copies in the United States, Don Omar released his much anticipated second studio album. King of Kings entered at No. 7 with becoming the highest charting debut by a reggaeton artist. In just few weeks it sold over 160,000 copies in US. It eventually sold more than 4 millions of copies worldwide. In October 2006, Billboard announced the tour in an article. It also announced that the cost of the staging the tour was estimated at two million dollars. with a massive stage production complete with elaborate pyrotechnics and full-blown theatrical and dance elements.

== Commercial reception ==
Tickets prices in the United States were between $35 and $95. The Puerto Rico concerts were sold out.

In Chile, the media reported 80,000 fans at the concert and over 20,000 in Argentina. In Venezuela, 125,000 fans were reported at his concert in Barquisimeto, a record for the highest attendance for a show in the country.

The tour was producer by Latin Entertainment Group and sponsored for Verizon in 2006. The King of Kings Tour was multi-million dollar.

== Critical reception ==
Agustin Gurza from the Los Angeles Times gave the concert a positive review claiming "Don Omar takes reggaeton higher"

== Tour dates ==
Date	City	Country	Venue
South America
July 19, 2006 (Note: This Concert was part of the El Gran Festival Musical 2006)	Cartagena	Colombia	Parque de la Marina
July 21, 2006 (Note: This concert was part of the 55 Feria Exposición Agropecuaria)	Buga	Colombia	Coliseo Armando Moncada Campuzano
July 28, 2006	Pampatar	Venezuela	Canodromo de Margarita
July 30, 2006	Caracas	Venezuela	Poliedro de Caracas
Europe
August 3, 2006	Rome	Italy	Hipódromo delle Capannelle,
August 4, 2006	London	England	O2 Academy Brixton
North America
September 23, 2006 (Note: This performance was part of La Kalle 105.9 Block Party Concert)	New York	United States	Madison Square Garden
October 13, 2006	Norcross	United States	North Atlanta Trade Center
October 14, 2006	Uncasville	United States	Sun Arena
October 20, 2006	Washington, D.C.	United States	Verizon Center
October 21, 2006	Chicago	United States	UIC Pavilion
October 26, 2006	Los Angeles	United States	Gibson Amphitheatre
October 27, 2006	Los Angeles	United States	Gibson Amphitheatre
October 28, 2006	Fresno	United States	Save Mart Center
October 29, 2006	San Francisco	United States	Crow Palace
November 3, 2006	Houston	United States	Toyota Center
November 4, 2006	Houston	United States	Reliant Arena
November 5, 2006	Dallas	United States	American Airlines Center
November 10, 2006	New York	United States	Theater at Madison Square Garden
November 11, 2006	Atlantic City	United States	Mark G. Etess Arena
November 16, 2006	Estero	United States	Germain Arena
November 18, 2006	Kisssimmee	United States	Silver Spur Arena
November 19, 2006	Miami	United States	American Airlines Arena
November 25, 2006	Glendale	United States	Jobing.com Arena
December 1, 2006	San Juan	Puerto Rico	Coliseo de Puerto Rico
December 2, 2006	San Juan	Puerto Rico	Coliseo de Puerto Rico
December 23, 2006 (Note: This Concert was part of Party of La Perla)	San Juan	Puerto Rico	La Perla
South America
December 27, 2006 (Note: This concert was part of La Feria de Cali)	Cali	Colombia	Estadio Pascual Guerrero
January 6, 2007 (Note: This Concert was part of Party of Torres de Sabanas)	Carolina	Puerto Rico	Residencial Torres de Sabanas
February 24, 2007 (Note: This concert was part of the Reggaeton Live Festival 2007)	Asuncion	Paraguay	Club Olimpia
February 26, 2007 (Note: This Concert was part of the XLVIII Festival Internacional de la Canción de Viña del Mar)	Viña del Mar	Chile	Quinta Vergara Amphitheater
April 1, 2007 (Note: This concert was co-headlined by Wisin & Yandel and had the name of "La Triologia del género")	Santiago	Chile	Estadio Nacional
May 4, 2007	Cali	Colombia	Plaza de Toros Cañaveralejo
May 5, 2007	Medellín	Colombia	Plaza de Toros La Macarena
May 6, 2007	San Felipe	Venezuela	
May 30, 2007	Guayaquil	Ecuador	Estadio Modelo Alberto Spencer Herrera
May 31, 2007	Riobamba	Ecuador	
June 1, 2007	Quito	Ecuador	Coliseo Rumiñahui
June 2, 2007	Cuenca	Ecuador	
North America
June 9, 2007 (Note: This concert was part of La Kalle 105.9 FM Reggaeton Festival.)	New York City	United States	Shea Stadium
Europe
July 27, 2007	Las Palmas	Spain	Recinto Infecar
July 28, 2007	Madrid	Spain	Cubierta de Leganés
July 30, 2007	Bilbao	Spain	Discoteca Santana 27
August 1, 2007	Tenerife	Spain	Plaza Cristo
North America
August 11, 2007	Managua	Nicaragua	Estadio Efrain Tijerino
August 12, 2007	San José	Costa Rica	Autódromo La Guácima
August 25, 2007 (Note: This concert was co-headlined by Aventura)	Panama City	Panama	Figali Convention Center
South America
September 15, 2007 (Note: This concert was part of Dia Nacional del Genero)	San Juan	Puerto Rico	Hiram Bithorn Studium
September 20, 2007	La Paz	Bolivia	Estadio Cruceño Ramón Tahuichi Aguilera.
September 21, 2007	Valencia	Venezuela	Forum de Valencia
September 22, 2007 (Note: This Concert was part of the XXXV Feria Internacional de Barquisimeto.)	Barquisimeto	Venezuela	Arena Plaza Ferial
September 23, 2007	Caracas	Venezuela	Poliedro de Caracas
October 5, 2007	Asunción	Paraguay	Club Olimpia
October 9, 2007	Buenos Aires	Argentina	Luna Park
October 10, 2007	Buenos Aires	Argentina	Luna Park
October 12, 2007	Santiago	Chile	Arena Santiago
