= Virtual Diva =

Single by Don Omar

from the album iDon and Fast & Furious
- Released: February 3, 2009
- Recorded: 2008
- Genre: Reggaeton; electropop
- Length: 3:59
- Label: Machete, VI
- Songwriters: William Landrón, Armando Rosario
- Producer: Diesel

Don Omar singles chronology
| "Run the Show" (2008) | "Virtual Diva" (2009) | "Sexy Robótica" (2009) |

Music video
- "Virtual Diva" on YouTube

"Virtual Diva" is the first single by Puerto Rican reggaeton performer Don Omar from his third studio album iDon. It was released on February 3, 2009, through Machete Music and VI Music. The song was released through nationwide airplay in December 2008, and has since become the most requested song at urban radio, reaching the number-one position on the Billboard Latin Rhythm Airplay chart. The song is included in the soundtrack of Grand Theft Auto IV, the soundtrack of Saints Row: The Third as well as in the Fast & Furious soundtrack.

== Music video ==
Don Omar in the music video for "Virtual Diva".

A music video for "Virtual Diva" was produced and filmed in Buenos Aires, Argentina. Around the end of January 2009, after celebrating with fellow working bachata group Marcy Place while performing at the Providence Club in New York City, Don Omar was finishing up on recording his new studio album. It would eventually be announced that he would be traveling down to Argentina once again to start filming the music video, which finished production on February 13, 2009. The video feature Argentinean model Ingrid Grudke, who portrays a doctor who wants to perform a grand experiment transforming Don Omar into half-man, half-machine.

The song was also performed live for the first time on the MTV Tr3́s variety series, Entertainment as a Second Language, on February 26, 2009.

== Track listings and formats ==
Digital download single

1. "Virtual Diva" – 3:59

== Charts ==
| Chart (2009) | Peak position |
|---|---|
| Chile (Top 20) | 6 |
| Chile Top 40 Aiplay (Los 40) | 9 |
| Colombian Airplay (EFE) | 7 |
| Honduras (EFE) | 3 |
| Spain (Promusicae) | 11 |
| US Hot Latin Songs (Billboard) | 10 |
| US Latin Rhythm Airplay (Billboard) | 1 |
| US Bubbling Under Hot 100 Singles (Billboard) | 25 |
| Venezuela Top Latino (Record Report) | 1 |

== Certifications ==
| Region | Certification | Certified units/sales |
|---|---|---|
| Spain (Promusicae) | Gold | 20,000^{*} |
^{*} Sales figures based on certification alone.

== See also ==
- List of Billboard Latin Rhythm Airplay number ones of 2009
