= Billboard Latin Music Award for Reggaeton Album of the Year =

American music award (2005–2008)

Billboard Latin Music Award for the Reggaeton Album of the Year
- Current: 2008 Latin Billboard Music Awards
- Awarded for: the most popular reggaeton albums in Billboard magazine
- Country: United States
- Presented by: Billboard
- First award: 2005
- Final award: 2008

Highlights
- Most awards: Daddy Yankee (3)
- Most nominations: Don Omar, Ivy Queen and Daddy Yankee (3)
- Website: billboardevents.com

The Billboard Latin Music Award for Reggaeton Album of the Year was an honor presented annually at the Billboard Latin Music Awards, a ceremony that recognizes "the most popular albums, songs, and performers in Latin music, as determined by the sales, radio airplay, streaming and social data that shapes Billboard's weekly charts." According to Billboard magazine, the category was "created in response to the growing number of charting titles from the genre" of reggaeton. Reggaeton is a genre that has roots in Latin and Caribbean music. Its sound derived from the Reggae en Español in Panama.

The accolade was first presented at the eleventh Billboard Latin Music awards in 2005 to Puerto Rican singer Daddy Yankee for his album Barrio Fino (2004). The record made Daddy Yankee the first reggaeton act to debut at the top of the Billboard Latin Albums chart and became the best-selling Latin album of the decade (2000-2010) in the United States. Yankee also received the accolade at the 2006 and 2008 awards ceremonies for his albums Barrio Fino: En Directo (2005) and El Cartel: The Big Boss (2007). Don Omar became the second and only other artist to win the award at the Billboard Latin Music Awards of 2007, where his album King of Kings (2006) was awarded. Puerto Rican singer Ivy Queen is the most nominated artist without a win, with three nominations, and the only female nominee. The Billboard Latin Music Awards of 2009 introduced thirteen new categories, one of which, the Latin Rhythm Album of the Year award, replaced the accolade for Reggaeton Album of the Year.

== Recipients ==
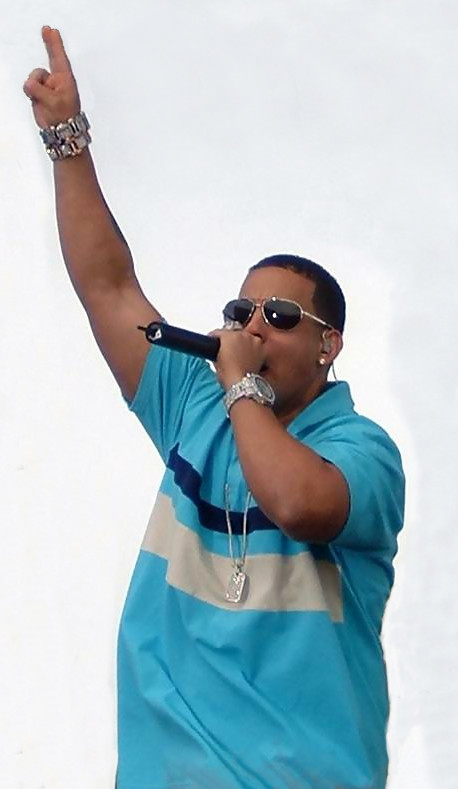
Daddy Yankee, winner in 2005, 2006 and 2008

Year^{[I]}	Performing artist(s)	Nationality^{[II]}	Work	Nominees^{[III]}	Ref.
2005	Daddy Yankee	Puerto Rico	Barrio Fino	Ivy Queen — Diva: Platinum Edition; Don Omar — The Last Don Live; Luny Tunes — La Trayectoria	
2006	Daddy Yankee	Puerto Rico	Barrio Fino: En Directo	Don Omar — Da Hitman Presents: Reggaeton Latino; Ivy Queen — Flashback; Wisin & Yandel — Pa'l Mundo	
2007	Don Omar	Puerto Rico	King of Kings	Calle 13 — Calle 13; Luny Tunes & Tainy — Mas Flow: Los Benjamins; R.K.M & Ken-Y — Masterpiece	
2008	Daddy Yankee	Puerto Rico	El Cartel: The Big Boss	Ivy Queen — Sentimiento; Wisin & Yandel — Wisin vs. Yandel: Los Extraterrestres; Zion — The Perfect Melody	

== Notes ==
^{^[I]} Each year is linked to the article about the Billboard Latin Music Awards held that year.
^{^[II]} The nationality of the performing artist(s).
^{^[III]} The name of the performer and the nominated album
