= The Last Don Live =

2004 live album by Don Omar

Live album by Don Omar
- Released: June 08, 2004 (CD); September 14, 2004 (DVD)
- Recorded: 2004
- Genre: Reggaeton
- Length: 1:44:01
- Label: V.I. Music

Don Omar chronology
The Last Don (2003)	The Last Don Live (2004)	Los Bandoleros (2005)

Professional ratings
Review scores
Source	Rating
Allmusic	3.5/5 stars

The Last Don Live is a live album by Don Omar. The second CD contains 3 studio tracks: Pobre Diabla and the 2 versions of Carta A Un Amigo. The album sold over 1,000,000 copies worldwide. It was nominated for a Latin Grammy Award for Best Urban Music Album in the Latin Grammys of 2005, Lo Nuestro Award for Urban Album of the Year in the Premio Lo Nuestro 2005 and Reggaeton Album Of The Year in the 2005 Latin Billboard Music Awards but won none.

== Track listing ==
=== CD ===
Disc: 1
No.	Title	Length
1.	"Opening: The Immigrant"	2:07
2.	"Dale Don Dale"	3:30
3.	"Tú Te Estás Calentando"	2:23
4.	"Desde Que Llegó"	3:04
5.	"Ven Suéltate"	3:02
6.	"Medley De Éxitos: Déjala/Acorrálala/Leona/Se Enciende la Disco"	4:48
7.	"Medley: A Mi Manera/My Way" (featuring Andy Montañez)	5:43
8.	"Medley De Salsa: El Nazareno/Las Tumbas/El Incomprendido" (featuring Tego Calderón and Andy Montañez)	8:41
9.	"Suelta Como Gabete"	3:32
10.	"Gata Suelta" (featuring Glory)	3:08
11.	"Baila Morena" (featuring Héctor & Tito)	3:38
12.	"Amor De Colegio" (featuring Héctor & Tito)	3:01
13.	"Mírame" (featuring Héctor & Tito)	3:19
14.	"De Niña Te Hice Mi Mujer" (featuring Héctor & Tito)	4:47

Disc: 2
No.	Title	Length
1.	"¿Quién la Vio Llorar?"	3:54
2.	"Aunque Te Fuiste"	5:56
3.	"Intocable"	2:59
4.	"Entre Tú y Yo"	3:17
5.	"Provocándome"	2:23
6.	"Guayaquil"	3:17
7.	"Dile"	3:24
8.	"Así Soy"	6:02
9.	"Pobre Diabla"	3:10
10.	"Carta a Un Amigo"	3:58
11.	"Carta a Un Amigo" (Versión Salsa)	4:02

- The last three song on disc 2 are studio recorded songs. Meaning they're not from a live performance nor concert.

=== DVD ===
Disc: 1
No.	Title	Length
1.	"Opening: The Immigrant"	2:06
2.	"Dale Don Dale"	3:30
3.	"Tú Te Estás Calentando"	2:23
4.	"Desde Que Llegó"	3:04
5.	"Ven Suéltate"	3:01
6.	"Medley De Éxitos: Déjala/Acorrálala/Leona/Se Enciende La Disco"	4:49
7.	"Medley: A Mi Manera/My Way" (featuring Andy Montañez)	4:41
8.	"Medley De Salsa: El Nazareno/Las Tumbas/El Incomprendido" (featuring Tego Calderón & Andy Montañez)	8:35
9.	"Suelta Como Gabete"	3:42
10.	"Gata Suelta" (featuring Glory)	3:08
11.	"Baila Morena" (featuring Héctor & Tito)	3:37
12.	"Amor De Colegio" (featuring Héctor & Tito)	3:01
13.	"Mírame" (featuring Héctor & Tito)	3:10
14.	"De Niña Te Hice Mi Mujer" (featuring Héctor & Tito)	4:47

Disc 1: Extra Features
No.	Title	Length
1.	"Backstage Footage"	7:57
2.	"Commentaries By: Frankie J / Andy Montañez / Héctor "El Bambino" / Eduardo Reyes"

Disc: 2
No.	Title	Length
1.	"¿Quién la Vio Llorar?"	3:53
2.	"Aunque Te Fuiste"	5:55
3.	"Intocable"	3:07
4.	"Entre Tú y Yo"	3:16
5.	"Provocándome"	2:03
6.	"Guayaquil"	3:16
7.	"Dile"	3:35
8.	"Así Soy"	5:35

Disc 2: Extra Features
No.	Title	Length
1.	"In-Store"	2:03
2.	"Infomercial"	3:12

Musical Director: Ledif Franceschini

== Charts ==
=== Weekly charts ===
Chart (2004)	Peak position
U.S. Billboard 200	84
U.S. Billboard Top Heatseekers	31
U.S. Billboard Top Latin Albums	2
U.S. Billboard Tropical Albums	1
U.S. Billboard Reggae Albums	1

=== Year-end charts ===
Chart (2004)	Position
US Latin Albums (Billboard)	24
US Tropical Albums (Billboard)	2

== Sales and certifications ==
Region	Certification	Certified units/sales
United States (RIAA)	2× Platinum (Latin)	200,000^{^}
^{^} Shipments figures based on certification alone.

== See also ==
- List of Billboard Tropical Albums number ones from the 2000s
