= Back to Reggaeton Tour =

2024–2025 concert tour by Don Omar

- National tour by Don Omar
- Location: North America
- Associated album: Back to Reggaeton
- Start date: March 7, 2024
- End date: March 30, 2025
- Legs: 3
- No. of shows: 50
- Attendance: 335,000
- Box office: US$ 39.2 Million

Don Omar concert chronology
- The Kingdom Tour (2015–2016); Back to Reggaeton Tour (2024–2025); The Last King World Tour (2026–2027)

Back to Reggaeton was a concert tour by Puerto Rican singer Don Omar to celebrate the 25th anniversary of his musical career and support his similarly titled EP. The tour consisted on two legs and of 40 concerts across the United States and Canada. The tour kicked off at Reading, Pennsylvania, on March 7, 2024, and concluded at Elmont, New York, on September 15, 2024. Initially, a first leg with 21 shows were announced, grossing over US$17,8 million and selling over 150,000 tickets. Following the success, second leg with more shows were added. Back to Reggaetón is the artist`s first major headlining tour in a decade and his first since The Kingdom Tour with Daddy Yankee in 2015-16. Eventually, it was ranked 10th at Billboard Top 10 Latin Tours of 2024 with 335,000 tickets sold, grossing over US$39.2 million of dollars on 39 shows.

== Background ==
On November 2, 2023, Don Omar released the EP Back to Reggaeton to streaming services along with the single "Sandunga", a collaboration with Wisin and Yandel produced by Luny Tunes. The track reached the top of the charts on Puerto Rican airplay and Latin music charts in the US. Omar explained he wanted to return to old-school reggaeton roots with this release.

== Tour dates ==
On December 8, 2023, the dates of Omar's tour were revealed.

List of 2024 concerts
Date	City	Country	Venue
March 7, 2024	Reading	United States	Santander Arena
March 9, 2024	Brooklyn	United States	Barclays Center
March 10, 2024	Newark	United States	Prudential Center
March 15, 2024	Toronto	Canada	Coca-Cola Coliseum
March 17, 2024	Montreal	Canada	Place Bell
March 21, 2024	Rosemont	United States	Allstate Arena
March 23, 2024	Sugar Land	United States	Smart Financial Centre
March 24, 2024	San Antonio	United States	Frost Bank Center
March 27, 2024	Inglewood	United States	Kia Forum
March 29, 2024	Palm Desert	United States	Acrisure Arena
March 30, 2024	San Jose	United States	SAP Center
April 4, 2024	Las Vegas	United States	MGM Grand Garden Arena
April 5, 2024	Glendale	United States	Desert Diamond Arena
April 7, 2024	Grand Prairie	United States	Texas Trust CU Theatre
April 11, 2024	Uncasville	United States	Mohegan Sun Arena
April 13, 2024	Charlotte	United States	Bojangles Coliseum
April 14, 2024	Fairfax	United States	EagleBank Arena
April 18, 2024	Duluth	United States	Gas South Arena
April 19, 2024	Orlando	United States	Kia Center
April 21, 2024	Miami	United States	Kaseya Center
August 7, 2024	Oakland	United States	Oakland Arena
August 8, 2024	Sacramento	United States	Golden 1 Center
August 10, 2024	Seattle	United States	WaMu Theater
August 11, 2024	Portland	United States	Moda Center
August 15, 2024	Hidalgo	United States	Payne Arena
August 16, 2024	Austin	United States	H-E-B Center
August 18, 2024	El Paso	United States	Don Haskins Center
August 20, 2024	Los Angeles	United States	Crypto.com Arena
August 21, 2024	Ontario	United States	Toyota Arena
August 23, 2024	San Diego	United States	Pechanga Arena
August 28, 2024	Denver	United States	Bellco Theater
August 30, 2024	Milwaukee	United States	Fiserv Forum
September 1, 2024	Greensboro	United States	Greensboro Coliseum
September 6, 2024	Tampa	United States	Amalie Arena
September 8, 2024	Washington, D.C.	United States	Capital One Arena
September 12, 2024	Boston	United States	Agganis Arena
September 14, 2024	Newark	United States	Prudential Center
September 15, 2024	Elmont	United States	UBS Arena

List of 2025 concerts
Date	City	Country	Venue
March 14, 2025	Merida	Mexico	Estadio Kukulcán de Mérida
March 16, 2025	Villa Hermosa	Mexico	Estadio Centenario de Villahermosa
March 18, 2025	Veracruz	Mexico	Estadio Beto Ávila
March 20, 2025	Puebla	Mexico	Centro Expositor Los Fuertes
March 21, 2025	Ciudad de Mexico	Mexico	Explanada del Estadio Azteca
March 22, 2025	Ciudad de Mexico	Mexico	Explanada del Estadio Azteca
March 24, 2025	Queretaro	Mexico	Estadio Corregidora
March 26, 2025	Leon	Mexico	Poliforum de León
March 28, 2025	Guadalajara	Mexico	Calle 2
March 30, 2025	Monterrey	Mexico	Estadio Mobil Super
