= IDon =

iDon

Studio album by Don Omar
- Released: April 28, 2009
- Recorded: 2008
- Genre: Reggaeton; hip hop; electro; rock; EDM
- Length: 42 minutes (Standard edition)
- Label: Machete
- Producer: Don Omar (exec); Diesel; Danny Fornaris; Echo; Effect-O, Lex; Robin.

Don Omar chronology
El Pentágono: The Return (2008)	iDon (2009)	Meet the Orphans (2010)

Alternative covers
- Amazon/Alternative cover

Singles from iDon
- 1. "Virtual Diva" Released: February 3, 2009; 2. "Sexy Robótica" Released: June 5, 2009; 3. "Ciao Bella" Released: August 18, 2009; 4. "Blue Zone" Released: 2010 (Venezuela only)

Professional ratings
Review scores
Source	Rating
Allmusic	3/5 stars

iDon (also stylized as iDON and idon) is the third studio album by Puerto Rican reggaeton performer Don Omar released worldwide on April 28, 2009, through Universal Music Group and Machete Music. The album was assumed to be named Icon when news of the upcoming album circulated the internet, but was later confirmed to be named iDon in November 2008.

The album received a nomination for the Billboard Latin Music Award for Latin Rhythm Album of the Year in 2010. Also the album was received nomination for the Latin Grammy Awards for Best Urban Music Album in 2009.

== Background ==
In May 2007, during the King of Kings Tour, Omar expressed in an interview, his intentions of recording an English language album but those plans were later scrapped. According to the artist, the recording seasons for Idon took 18 months to be finished. Don Omar explained that he was involved in every detail of the production and the recording process.

As of 2009, Don Omar sold 1.5 million copies in the United States of his three first studios albums while King of Kings were the best seller with 515,000 copies. According to Skander Goucha, VP of digital for Universal Music Latin Entertainment (UMLE), expressed that they were expecting IDon to be the best selling digital Latin album of the year. Also, explained that Don Omar already was the best selling digital artist of the label with 4 million of digital mobile downloads. In addition, in May, Omar would become Universal's first Latin artist to have an IPhone and IPod Touch application that will allow fans to download constantly updated content and recorded messages.

iDON, the album, is an epic musical event that represents the new chapter in the Don Omar saga. The album, scheduled for an April 28 release, is the brand new studio album that details the transformation of the visionary recording artist into iDON, a half man-half machine creation. A transformation of the international superstar into a cybernetic being.

— Machete Music, Universal Music Group

== Conception ==
The concept of the album was revealed when Universal Music Group described the music on the album as "an evolution of Don Omar's music fusing electronic, dance, hip-hop and reggaeton sounds as the musical landscape for the Latin music superstar's revolutionary lyrics." The label also stated that the album "will be supported by visual and marketing campaign elements focused on positioning Don Omar as the defining artist for the digital age and the leader of the music world's next generation." The record label also described iDon to be "one of the most anticipated albums in the history of Latin music." As stated above, the album is expected to have an overall electro-dance vibe with an urban touch to it.

On an interview in April 2009, Don Omar explained that he created the "IDON" project as an ongoing saga that can unfold into more albums or more digital tracks. Already, there are songs - including a collaboration with Daddy Yankee - that are being saved for future release.

=== Production ===
The artist explained that IDon is a mashup of electronic music, Rock, Dance, EDM and 90s music. Also, described the album as innovative and super-urban. The album is mainly produced by long-time working reggaeton producer Diesel, who also produced one of Don Omar's well known singles, "Salió El Sol." The album will also include addition production from Danny Fornaris, Echo and Effect-O. It was originally believed to also include album collaborations with Marcy Place, a bachata group founded by Don Omar. It was later confirmed that they would not be performing with Don Omar on his third studio album.

== Promotion ==
=== Singles ===
- The lead single, "Virtual Diva", was released through nationwide airplay in December 2008, and has since become the most requested song at urban radio, reaching the number-one position on the Billboard Latin Rhythm Airplay chart. It was then released on both digital and mobile formats on February 3, 2009, in the United States. The song was written and produced by Don Omar and Diesel, and has a more upbeat electro-urban mix in the sound, which was considered something new for Don Omar. It was the most successful single from the album at the time of its release, peaking at number 10 on the Billboard Hot Latin Tracks chart. A music video for "Virtual Diva" was produced and filmed in Buenos Aires, Argentina. It was announced around the end of January 2009 after a performance with Marcy Place at the Providence Club in New York City that he would be traveling by the end of the week to Argentina to begin filming. The video was finished with production on February 13, 2009, when it was announced that Don Omar had already concluded with filming. The video will feature Argentinean model Ingrid Grudke, who portrays a doctor who wants to perform a grand experiment transforming Don Omar into half-man, half-machine. The song was also performed live for the first time on the MTV Tr3́s variety series Entertainment as a Second Language on February 26, 2009.
- "Sexy Robotica" is the official second single from the album on June 5, 2009. A music video for "Sexy Robotica" was released on July 10, 2009.
- "Ciao Bella" is the official third single from iDon, it was released on August 18, 2009. A salsa version was released to promote the single.

Other notable songs

- Although "Blue Zone" was not released officially as a single, it charted at number #5 on the Record Report Latin chart from Venezuela, and was considered a successful single.

=== Tour ===
Don Omar is expected to be touring in 2010, in promotion of his re-edition third studio album iDon. As confirmed on his MySpace profile, dates and locations of his concert tour have yet to be released, and are likely to be released on the day of the album's re-release.

== Commercial reception ==
Idon debut at 32 US Billboard 200 selling over 17,000 copies, lower on comparation his previous album King of Kings which debut at number 7 selling over 68,000 copies on the first week. The album also debuted at the top of US Billboard Top Latin Albums at stayed there for three consecutive weeks. As of 2010, the album sold around 100,000 copies in the United States.

The album was certified platinum in Chile for 75,000 units sold of the songs of the album. The album also was certified gold in Paraguay and Argentina. As of December 2009, the album sold over 600,000 copies. According to some sources the album sold over one million of copies worldwide and 4 million of digital downloaded songs.

== Track listing ==
Standard edition

No.	Title	Producer(s)	Length
1.	"The Chosen"	Diesel	3:51
2.	"Virtual Diva"	Diesel	3:59
3.	"Blue Zone"	Danny Fornaris	3:31
4.	"Ciao Bella"	Echo	4:24
5.	"Oasis"	Echo, Effect-O	4:24
6.	"Sexy Robótica"	Lex, Robin, Danny Fornaris	3:54
7.	"How We Roll"	Lex, Robin	4:06
8.	"Galactic Blues"	Danny Fornaris	4:01
9.	"CO2"	Danny Fornaris	3:01
10.	"SCI-FI"	Lex, Robin	3:40

Bonus Tracks

No.	Title	Producer(s)	Length
11.	"Virtual Diva (Urban Mambo Remix)" (iTunes Bonus Track)		3:29
12.	"Club 3000" (iTunes Pre-Order Bonus Track)	Echo, Effect-O	5:03

== Chart performance ==
Chart (2009)	Peak position
Argentina Albums Chart	3
Mexican Albums Chart	51
Spanish Albums Chart	31
U.S. Billboard Top Latin Albums	1
U.S. Billboard Latin Rhythm Albums	1
U.S. Billboard Top Rap Albums	9
U.S. Billboard 200	32

== Sales and certifications ==
Region	Certification	Certified units/sales
Argentina (CAPIF)	Gold	20,000^{^}
Chile	Platinum	75,000
Paraguay	Gold	
^{^} Shipments figures based on certification alone.

== Credits ==
- Philip Chiore - engineer, mixing
- Kiley Del'Valle - design
- Mateo Garcia - photography
- Nanette Lamboy - public relations
- William Omar Landron - executive producer
- Adam Torres - management
