= Quevedo =

Quevedo may refer to:

- Francisco de Quevedo, a prominent Spanish poet
- Quevedo (surname)
  - Quevedo (singer), Spanish singer and rapper
- Quevedo, Ecuador
- Quevedo (Madrid Metro), a station on Line 2

== See also ==
- Club Deportivo Quevedo, football (soccer) club in Ecuador
- Miguel Ángel de Quevedo metro station, on the Mexico City Metro
- Quevedos, a municipality in the west-central part of the state of Rio Grande do Sul
