= El Pentágono: The Return =

Don Omar album

Compilation album by Don Omar
- Released: June 3, 2008
- Genres: Reggaeton; Latin pop
- Length: 53:46 min.
- Label: Machete Music

Don Omar chronology
King of Kings: Live (2007)	El Pentágono: The Return (2008)	iDon (2009)

El Pentágono: The Return is a Don Omar album released on June 3, 2008. It is the special edition to El Pentágono.

== Track listings ==
#	Title	Performer	Producer(s)	Length
1	"Tal Vez"	Magnate & Valentino		3:45
2	"Calm My Nerves"	Don Omar feat. Rell	Nely & Richy Peña	3:33
3	"Lentísimo"	Yomo		2:50
4	"Anda Guilla"	Mario VI	Fade	3:09
5	"Palgo y Palga"	Polaco		3:00
6	"Veo"	Zion	Doble A & Nales	3:17
7	"Mala Es"	Jowell & Randy	Luny Tunes, Miki	3:27
8	"OK"	Tego Calderón	Hednokers	2:56
9	"Culpable"	Joel		3:56
10	"La Mujer De Mis Sueños"	Alexis feat. Los Yetzons	Doble A & Nales	3:06
11	"Suave al Oido"	Franco "El Gorila"	Thilo & Hednokers	3:21
12	"Dame de Eso"	Andy Boy	DJ Memo	3:01
13	"Ellos Quieren"	Cosculluela		3:18
14	"No Sera Lo Mismo"	Aniel		2:49
15	"Yo No Sé Por Qué"	John Eric	Tone & Jerry	3:48
16	"Easy"	Zion, Tego Calderón, Julio Voltio, Eddie Dee, & Cosculluela		4:25
