= The Last King World Tour =

Upcoming concert tour by Don Omar

The Last King World Tour is an ongoing concert tour by Puerto Rican rapper and singer Don Omar, commemorating the 20th anniversary of his best-selling album, King of Kings (2006). Initially announced as a North American tour, it was later expanded to include European dates in 2027. The tour began on September 25, 2026, in Reading, Pennsylvania, and is currently set to conclude on July 24, 2027, in Gran Canaria, Spain.

Additional cities were added in North America due to high demand, and more than 120,000 tickets were sold within 24 hours of the announcement of the European dates.

== Tour dates ==
On May 18, 2026, the dates of Omar's tour were revealed by his official website.

List of 2026 concerts
Date	City	Country	Venue
September 25, 2026	Reading	United States	Santander Arena
September 26, 2026	Boston	United States	TD Garden
September 27, 2026	Hartford	United States	PeoplesBank Arena
October 1, 2026	Dallas	United States	American Airlines Center
October 3, 2026	Orlando	United States	Kia Center
October 4, 2026	Miami	United States	Kaseya Center
October 8, 2026	Chicago	United States	Allstate Arena
October 10, 2026	Brooklyn	United States	Barclays Center
October 11, 2026	Newark	United States	Prudential Center
October 14, 2026	Charlotte	United States	Spectrum Center
October 15, 2026	Washington	United States	Capital One Arena
October 17, 2026	Atlanta	United States	State Farm Arena
October 22, 2026	San Antonio	United States	Frost Bank Center
October 23, 2026	Houston	United States	Toyota Center
October 25, 2026	El Paso	United States	Don Haskins Center
November 5, 2026	San Jose	United States	SAP Center
November 6, 2026	Inglewood (Note: Billed as Los Angeles)	United States	Kia Forum
November 8, 2026	Phoenix	United States	Mortgage Matchup Center
November 10, 2026	Ontario	United States	Toyota Arena
November 11, 2026	Las Vegas	United States	Michelob Ultra Arena
November 13, 2026	Salt Lake City	United States	Delta Center

List of 2027 concerts
Date	City	Country	Venue
February 3, 2027	Denver	United States	Ball Arena
Februrary 5, 2027	Sacramento	United States	Golden 1 Center
February 7, 2027	Seattle	United States	Climate Pledge Arena
February 10, 2027	San Diego	United States	Pechanga Arena
February 11, 2027	Fresno	United States	Save Mart Center
February 12, 2027	Los Angeles	United States	Intuit Dome
February 17, 2027	Toronto	Canada	Scotiabank Arena
February 21, 2027	Montreal	Canada	Bell Centre
February 26, 2027	Chicago	United States	Allstate Arena
February 28, 2027	Belmont Park	United States	UBS Arena
March 3, 2027	Newark	United States	Prudential Center
March 4, 2027	Baltimore	United States	CFG Bank Arena
March 6, 2027	Fort Worth	United States	Ariat Arena
March 7, 2027	Austin	United States	Moody Center
March 10, 2027	Tampa	United States	Benchmark International Arena
March 12, 2027	Miami	United States	Kaseya Center
March 14, 2027	Orlando	United States	Kia Center
June 24, 2027	Zurich	Switzerland	Hallenstadion
June 25, 2027	Paris	France	Accor Arena
June 27, 2027	Dusseldorf	Germany	PSD Bank Dome
June 28, 2027	Berlin	Germany	Uber Arena
June 30, 2027	Amsterdam	Netherlands	Ziggo Dome
July 2, 2027	Milan	Italy	Fiera Milano Live
Jul 4, 2027	Naples	Italy	Ex Base Nato
July 5, 2027	London	England	The O2 Arena
July 8, 2027	Bilbao	Spain	Bizkaia Arena
July 10, 2027	Valencia	Spain	Estadi Ciutat de València
July 11, 2027	Murcia	Spain	Espacio Norte
July 15, 2027	Madrid	Spain	Riyadh Air Metropolitano
July 16, 2027	Malaga	Spain	Marenostrum Fuengirola
July 18, 2027	Galacia	Spain	Puerto de A Coruña
July 22, 2027	Lisboa	Portugal	MEO Arena
July 24, 2027	Gran Canaria	Spain	Anexo Estadio de Gran Canaria
October 21, 2027	Asunción	Paraguay	Arena Asunción
October 23, 2027	Buenos Aires	Argentina	Estadio Velez
October 27, 2027	Santiago	Chile	Estadio Monumental
October 28, 2027	Lima	Peru	Estadio Nacional de Lima
October 30, 2027	Quito	Ecuador	Estadio Olimpico Atahualpa
October 31, 2027	Guayaquil	Ecuador	Estadio Modelo Alberto Spencer
November 4, 2027	Bogotá	Colombia	Vive Claro
November 5, 2027	Cali	Colombia	Estadio Pascual Guerrero
November 6, 2027	Medellín	Colombia	Estadio Envigado
November 7, 2027	Medellín	Colombia	Estadio Envigado
November 9, 2027	Monterrey	Mexico	Walmart Park
November 10, 2027	Guadalajara	Mexico	Estadio Panamericano
November 12, 2027	Mexico City	Mexico	Estadio Ciudad de los Deportes
November 14, 2027	Mexico City	Mexico	Estadio Ciudad de los Deportes
November 18, 2027	Guatemala City	Guatemala	Estadio Cemento Progreso
November 20, 2027	San Salvador	El Salvador	Estadio Nacional Jorge Gonzalez
November 23, 2027	Managua	Nicaragua	Estadio Nacional de Beisbol
November 25, 2027	Tegucigalpa	Honduras	Estadio Chochi Sosa
November 27, 2027	San Jose	Costa Rica	Estadio Nacional
November 28, 2027	Panama City	Panama	Estadio Nacional Rod Carew
