= Ciao Bella (song) =

Single by Don Omar

from the album iDon
- Released: August 18, 2009
- Genre: Reggaeton (Album version); Salsa (Single version)
- Length: 4:24 (Original album version); 4:19 (Single/salsa version)
- Label: Machete, VI
- Songwriters: William Omar Landron, Paul Irizarry, Eddie Montilla
- Producer: Echo

Don Omar singles chronology
"Sexy Robótica" (2009)	"Ciao Bella" (2009)	"Danza Kuduro" (2010)

"Ciao Bella" is the third and final single from Don Omar's third studio album iDon released on August 18, 2009 through Machete, VI. The song is written by Omar, Paul Irizarry and Eddie Montilla, and produced by Echo.

== Charts ==
Chart (2009)	Peak position
US Hot Latin Songs (Billboard)	39
US Tropical Airplay (Billboard)	18
Venezuela (Record Report)	8
