= Conteo =

Single by Don Omar featuring Juelz Santana

from the album King of Kings and The Fast And The Furious: Tokyo Drift: Soundtrack
- Released: July 28, 2006 (US)
- Genre: Reggaeton; hip-hop
- Length: 3:21 (album version); 3:18 (movie version)
- Label: Machete
- Songwriter: William Landron
- Producers: Nely "El Arma Secreta"; Naldo

Don Omar featuring Juelz Santana singles chronology
"Angelito" (2005)	"Conteo" (2006)	"Salió El Sol/Belly Danza" (2006)

Juelz Santana singles chronology
"There It Go (The Whistle Song)" (2005)	"Conteo" (2006)	"We Fly High (Remix)" (2007)

Alternative cover
- Movie soundtrack cover

"Conteo" is the second single by Don Omar taken from his album King of Kings. It was featured on the soundtrack to the 2006 film The Fast and the Furious: Tokyo Drift. and was the first song played during the ending credits. In the album version, it features rapper Juelz Santana but in the movie version, Santana's verse is not included.

== Music video ==
The video for the single features Don Omar and scenes from the 2006 car movie Tokyo Drift interspersed. The video is also featured on the DVD of The Fast and the Furious: Tokyo Drift as well as on the DVD of the deluxe re-release album King of Kings: Armageddon Edition.

== Official versions ==
"Conteo" only has two official versions, appearing on different albums.

- There's a version which Don Omar sings without Juelz Santana, and is the version promoting The Fast and the Furious: Tokyo Drift and the soundtrack.
- The version with both Don Omar and Juelz Santana appears on King of Kings.

== Chart positions ==
Chart (2006–07)	Peak position
Chile Top 40 Airplay	1
U.S. Billboard Latin Rhythm Airplay	36
Venezuela (National-Report)	4
