= Quevedo (surname) =

Quevedo (Spanish pronunciation: [ke'βeðo]) is a Spanish surname. Notable people with the surname include:

- Quevedo (rapper) (born 2001), Spanish singer and songwriter
- Carla Quevedo (born 1988), Argentine actress and designer
- Fernando Quevedo Rodríguez, a Guatemalan physicist
- Fernando Quevedo Salazar, a Spanish racing cyclist
- Francisco de Quevedo, a leading baroque poet of Spain's Siglo de Oro (Golden Century)
- Gabriella Evelina Quevedo (born 1997), Swedish guitarist
- Jhon Édison Rodríguez Quevedo (born 1991), Colombian fencer
- Joaquim Amado Quevedo (1946–2022), Brazilian politician
- José Quevedo, major in the Cuban army, fought Battle of La Plata during the Cuban Revolution
- Juan de Quevedo, 16th-century Spanish Franciscan bishop and missionary
- Julio Quevedo (1939–2025), Guatemalan athlete
- Leonardo Torres Quevedo, Spanish engineer and mathematician, would be called "Torres"
- El Mami Quevedo, Spanish footballer (soccer player)
- Manuel Quevedo, Venezuelan military general and politician
- Miguel Ángel de Quevedo, Mexican botanist
- Nuria Quevedo (1938–2025), Spanish-German painter and graphic artist
- Orlando Quevedo (born 1939), Filipino cardinal, current Archbishop emeritus of Cotabato
- Óscar González-Quevedo (1930–2019), Spanish-Brazilian priest and investigator in parapsychology
- Oswaldo Quevedo, Venezuelan Olympic swimmer
- Pedro de Quevedo y Quintano (1736–1818), Spanish Roman Catholic clergyman and politician
- Raymond Quevedo, birth name of Trinidadian calypsonian "Attila the Hun"
- Reynaldo Vera González-Quevedo (born 1961), Cuban chess grandmaster
- Rubén Quevedo, Venezuelan baseball player
- Samuel Alejandro Lafone Quevedo (1835–1920), an Argentinian archaeologist and author, son of Samuel Fisher Lafone
- Tadeo Santiago Quevedo Dixon (1933–2010), an English existential philosopher, notable for an interview with Albert Camus
