= Los Bandoleros Reloaded =

2006 compilation album by Don Omar

Compilation album by Don Omar
- Released: November 21, 2006
- Genre: Reggaeton; hip-hop
- Label: All Star, VI Music
- Producer: Don Omar; Eliel; DJ Memo; Doble A & Nales; Luny Tunes; Tainy; Rafi Mercenario; Nesty; Victor "El Nasi"; Mambo Kingz; Nely

Don Omar chronology
Da Hitman Presents Reggaetón Latino (2005)	Los Bandoleros Reloaded (2006)	King of Kings (2006)

Los Bandoleros Reloaded is two-CD compilation album presented by Don Omar, released on November 21, 2006. The album includes five tracks performed by Omar, where other performers include Cosculluela, Wisin & Yandel, Naldo, Yaga & Mackie, Baby Ranks, Glory and more.

== Track listing ==
=== Disc 1 ===
1. "Intro" (Gallego) - 4:00
2. "Anda Sola" (Don Omar) (Produced by DJ Memo) - 2:58
3. "My Space" (Don Omar, Wisin & Yandel) (Produced by Nely, Eliel) - 3:43
4. "La Vecinita" (Vico C) - 4:27
5. "Mángala" (Mario VI) - 2:48
6. "Baila Sola" (Franco "El Gorila") (Produced by Doble A & Nales) - 3:44
7. "Cae la Luna" (Valentino) - 3:26
8. "Tú Pa' Tras y Yo Pa' Lante" (Julio Voltio) - 3:18
9. "Buscándote" (Jomar) (Produced by Mambo Kingz) - 3:14
10. "El Señor de la Noche" (Don Omar) - 2:56
11. "El Bandolero" (Cosculluela) - 3:13
12. "Como Hacer" (Gocho) - 3:13
13. "Convéncete" (Naldo) (Produced by Nesty, Victor) - 3:14
14. "Acción" (Yaga & Mackie featuring Jeyko "El Padrote") - 3:15
15. "Te Recordaré" (Lennox, Norrys) - 3:02

=== Disc 2 ===
1. "Se Transporta" (Marvin) - 3:25
2. "Sicario" (Mero) - 3:28
3. "Quema, Quema" (Aldo & Dandy) (Produced by DJ Memo) - 3:39
4. "Declaro" (Manny Montes, Redimi2) - 4:42
5. "Estás Calentándome" (Baby Ranks) (Produced by Luny Tunes, Tainy) - 4:16
6. "Atácalos" (Rey Pirin) - 3:49
7. "Chica de Batalla" (Yo-Seph "The One") (Produced by Doble A & Nales) - 3:27
8. "No Te Obligo" (Alex Killer) - 3:25
9. "Ella Anda Sola" (Andy Boy) - 3:22
10. "Química II" (Wiso G) (Produced by Rafi Mercenario) - 3:25
11. "Chouchianna" (Glory) - 3:12
12. "Dios Te Libre" (TNT) - 4:21
13. "A lo Loco" (Roka & Gami) - 3:23
14. "Yo No Me Dejo" (Don Omar) (bonus track 1) - 4:00 - Diss track to Daddy Yankee
15. "9/11/06" (Don Omar, Rell) (bonus track 2) - 3:09 - Diss track to Daddy Yankee

DVD

1. "Don Omar" (Bandolero's on the road)

== Charts ==
Chart (2008)	Peak position
US Billboard Latin Rhythm Albums	7
US Billboard Top Latin Albums	25
