= The Last Don (album) =

Studio album by Don Omar
- Released: June 17, 2003
- Genre: Reggaeton
- Length: 46:35
- Label: VI
- Producers: Héctor el Bambino; Luny Tunes; Eliel; Noriega; Cheka

Don Omar chronology
The Last Don (2003)	The Last Don Live (2004)

Singles from The Last Don
- 1. "Dale Don Dale" Released: May 5, 2003; 2. "Intocable" Released: August 18, 2003; 3. "Dile" Released: November 17, 2003; 4. "Aunque Te Fuiste" Released: February 9, 2004

Professional ratings
Review scores
Source	Rating
AllMusic	4/5 stars

The Last Don is the solo debut album by Don Omar. It was released in 2003 and included collaborations from Daddy Yankee, Héctor el Bambino and Trébol Clan, among others.

The Last Don sold 411,000 units in the US and was certified Gold by the Recording Industry Association of America (RIAA). It sold over 2.5 million copies worldwide. An expanded version, titled The Last Don: The Gold Series was released on December 19, 2006, through Machete Music. It includes two new songs: "Pobre Diabla" and "Ronca".

== Track listing ==
Standard edition
No.	Title	Producer(s)	Length
1.	"Intro"	Luny Tunes	2:39
2.	"Dale Don Más Duro" (featuring Glory)	Eliel; Luny Tunes	2:41
3.	"Intocable"	Eliel; Luny Tunes	2:46
4.	"Dile"	Eliel	3:25
5.	"Aunque Te Fuiste"	Eliel	4:03
6.	"La Noche Está Buena" (featuring Daddy Yankee)	Luny Tunes	2:24
7.	"Provocándome"	Eliel; Luny Tunes	2:12
8.	"Caserios #2" (featuring Héctor el Bambino)	Eliel; Luny Tunes	4:05
9.	"¿Quién La Vio Llorar?"	Eliel	3:05
10.	"Perreando" (remix)	DJ Nelson	2:32
11.	"Tu Cuerpo Me Arrebata" (featuring Trébol Clan)	Eliel; Luny Tunes	3:23
12.	"La Recompenza" (featuring Gallego)	Eliel	4:46
13.	"Guayaquil"	Eduardo Reyes	3:09
14.	"Intocable" (remix)	DJ Kazzanova	1:44

Bonus track
No.	Title	Producer(s)	Length
15.	"Dale Don Dale" (featuring Glory)	Luny Tunes; Cheka	3:22

The Gold Series: bonus tracks
No.	Title	Producer(s)	Length
16.	"Pobre Diabla"	Eliel	4:12
17.	"Ronca"	Eliel	5:01

== Chart performance ==
Chart (2003–2005)	Peak position
Spanish Albums (PROMUSICAE)	70
U.S. Billboard 200	165
U.S. Billboard Catalog Albums	28
U.S. Billboard Latin Rhythm Albums	3
U.S. Billboard Top Latin Albums	2
U.S. Billboard Top Reggae Albums	3
U.S. Billboard Tropical Albums	4

== Sales and certifications ==
Region	Certification	Certified units/sales
Costa Rica	Gold	
Spain (Promusicae)	Gold	50,000^{^}
United States (RIAA)	Gold	500,000^{^}
Summaries
Central America (CFC)	Gold	
^{^} Shipments figures based on certification alone.
