= Da Hitman Presents Reggaetón Latino =

Compilation album by Don Omar
- Released: December 6, 2005
- Recorded: 2003–2005
- Genre: Reggaeton; hip hop; R&B
- Length: 44 min.
- Label: Machete Music
- Producer: Eliel; Don Omar; Luny Tunes; Aventura; Swizz Beatz; Play-N-Skillz; Big Humma

Don Omar chronology
Los Bandoleros (2005)	Da Hitman Presents Reggaetón Latino (2005)	Los Bandoleros Reloaded (2006)

Da Hitman Presents Reggaetón Latino is a 2005 compilation album by Don Omar. It was nominated for Billboard Latin Music Award for Reggaeton Album of the Year. The album sold 32,000 copies in its first week. and the album sold over 200 000 copies.

== Track listing ==
1. "Reggaetón Latino (Chosen Few Remix)" (featuring Fat Joe, N.O.R.E. and LDA) — 4:50
2. "Dile" — 3:24
3. "Ella y Yo" (Don Omar with Aventura) — 4:26
4. "Pobre Diabla (Remix)" (featuring Mr. Vegas) — 3:46
5. "Dale Don Dale (Remix)" (featuring Fabolous) — 3:35
6. "Scandalous" (Cuban Link featuring Don Omar) — 4:37
7. "Bandoleros" (featuring Tego Calderón) — 5:05
8. "Aunque Te Fuiste" (featuring Play-n-Skillz) — 4:03
9. "Hold You Down (Remix)" (Jennifer Lopez featuring Don Omar) — 3:57
10. "Entre Tú y Yo" — 3:06
11. "Ronca" (featuring Hector "El Father" and Zion) — 5:01
12. "Guayaquil" — 3:09

== Charts ==
Chart (2005)	Peak position
US Billboard 200	61
US Rap Albums (Billboard)	12
US Latin Albums (Billboard)	1
US Latin Rhythm Albums (Billboard)	1
