= Intocable (song) =

2005 single by Don Omar

Single by Don Omar

from the album The Last Don
- B-side: "Dile"
- Released: 2004 (worldwide radio); July 25, 2005 (US)
- Recorded: 2003
- Genre: Reggaeton
- Length: 2:46 (original version); 1:44 (DJ Casanova remix)
- Label: Machete
- Songwriter: William Landrón
- Producers: Luny Tunes; Eliel

Don Omar singles chronology
"Dile" (2004)	"Intocable" (2004)	"Pobre Diabla" (2004)

"Intocable" (English: "Untouchable") was selected as the track from Don Omar's debut album, The Last Don released on July 25, 2005, along with his single "Dile". The song did not receive much promotion but was notably accepted by fans and radio stations, charting at number 38 on the Billboard Tropical Songs. The song does not have a music video. It is said to have been written for a Puerto Rican drug lord Angel Ayala Vazquez, also known as "Buster" or "Angelo Millones," who paid for much of the production of the album.

== Track listings ==
- iTunes digital download
1. "Dile" – 3:25
2. "Intocable" – 2:46

== Charts ==
Chart (2004)	Peak position
U.S. Billboard Tropical Songs	38
