= El Pentágono =

2007 compilation album by Don Omar

Compilation album by Don Omar
- Released: March 27, 2007
- Recorded: 2006–2007
- Genre: Reggaeton
- Label: All Star Records
- Producer: Revol; DJ Alika; Nely "El Arma Secreta"; Richy Peña; Doble A & Nales "Los Presidentes"; Luny Tunes; Miki "La Mano Bionica"; Thilo; Hednokers; Nesty "La Mente Maestra"; Victor "El Nasi"; DNA; Walde; Mambo Kingz; Rafy Mercenario; Kalin; Sosa; Julian

Don Omar chronology
King of Kings: Armageddon Edition (2006)	El Pentágono (2007)	King of Kings: Live (2007)

El Pentágono is a compilation album by the reggaeton producer and owner of Update Music, Revol, although the album was presented by Don Omar and released on March 27, 2007.

== Track listing ==
#	Title	Performer(s)	Producer(s)	Length
1	"Easy"	Zion, Eddie Dee, Julio Voltio, Tego Calderón, Cosculluela	DJ Memo	4:26
2	"Calm My Nerves"	Don Omar feat. Rell	Nely & Richy Peña	3:33
3	"Veo"	Zion	Doble A & Nales	3:17
4	"OK"	Tego Calderón	Hednokers	2:55
5	"Vida Loca"	Arcángel	Mambo Kingz	3:43
6	"Mala Es"	Jowell & Randy	Luny Tunes, Miki	3:27
7	"Suave Al Oído"	Franco "El Gorila"	Thilo & Hednokers	3:21
8	"Just Like Sexo"	Dalmata	DJ Memo	3:21
9	"La Mujer de Mis Sueños"	Los Yetzons	Doble A & Nales	3:06
10	"Pide Más"	Joan & O'Neill	Nesty, Victor El Nasi & DNA	3:06
11	"Dame de Eso"	Andy Boy	DJ Memo	3:01
12	"Ellos Quieren"	Cosculluela	Mueka	3:18
13	"Yo No Sé Por Qué"	John Eric	Tone & Jery	3:48
14	"Nosotros Dos"	Wibal & Alex	Kalin, Sosa & Julian	2:57
15	"Corre Peligro"	O.G. Black	Tone & Jery	3:39
16	"El Brindis"	Mario VI	Fade	3:40
17	"No Será Lo Mismo"	Aniel	Walde	2:49
18	"La Bella Crisis"	Alberto Stylee	Rafy Mercenario, Kalin, Sosa & Julian	3:36
19	"Contigo"	High Rollers Family	Miki	3:45

== Charts ==
Chart (2007)	Peak position
US Billboard 200	164
US Top Latin Albums (Billboard)	7
US Latin Rhythm Albums (Billboard)	2
Venezuelan Albums (Recordland)	28

== Sales and certifications ==
Region	Certification	Certified units/sales
United States (RIAA)	Platinum (Latin)	60,000^{‡}
^{‡} Sales+streaming figures based on certification alone.
