= King of Kings: Live =

Live album by Don Omar
- Released: October 13, 2007 (CD, DVD)
- Genre: Reggaeton; Latin pop
- Length: 73 min.
- Label: Machete Music

Don Omar chronology
Don Omar Presenta: El Pentágono (2007)	King of Kings: Live (2007)	El Pentágono: The Return (2008)

Professional ratings
Review scores
Source	Rating
Allmusic	3.5/5 stars

King of Kings: Live is the second live album of Puerto Rican singer Don Omar, released on October 13, 2007 through Machete Music. It was nominated for a Lo Nuestro Award for Urban Album of the Year on the Premio Lo Nuestro 2009. A DVD of the concert was also released which included 3 music videos.

== Track listing ==
=== CD ===
Disc 1
No.	Title	Length
1.	"Ronca"	3:09
2.	"Reportense"	4:36
3.	"Salió El Sol"	4:08
4.	"El Rey – Predica"	4:46
5.	"Vuelve"	5:25
6.	"Tu No Sabes"	3:05
7.	"Angelito"	4:48
8.	"Ojitos Chiquitos"	2:36
9.	"Pobre Diabla"	2:19
10.	"Ella Y Yo"	4:37

Disc 2
No.	Title	Length
1.	"Medley"	4:26
2.	"Jangueo"	3:29
3.	"Reggaeton Latino"	2:56
4.	"Bandoleros"	3:58
5.	"Conteo"	3:31
6.	"El Rey De Los Curanderos"	3:53
7.	"Canción De Amor"	3:49
8.	"El Pantalon"	3:28
9.	"Ayer La Vi"	4:12

- The last four song on disc 2 are studio recorded songs. Meaning they're not from a live performance nor concert.

=== DVD ===
Disc 1
No.	Title	Length
1.	"Intro"	4:18
2.	"Ronca"	3:09
3.	"Reportense"	4:36
4.	"Salió El Sol"	4:08
5.	"El Rey – Predica"	4:46
6.	"Vuelve"	5:25
7.	"Tu No Sabes"	3:05
8.	"Angelito"	4:48
9.	"Ojitos Chiquitos"	2:36
10.	"Pobre Diabla"	2:19
11.	"Ella Y Yo"	4:37

Disc 2
No.	Title	Length
1.	"Medley"	4:26
2.	"Jangueo"	3:29
3.	"Reggaeton Latino"	2:56
4.	"Bandoleros"	3:58
5.	"Conteo"	3:31
6.	"Angelito (Music Video)"	4:46
7.	"Adiós (Music Video)"	4:14
8.	"Salió El Sol (Music Video)"	5:30

== Charts ==
Chart (2007)	Peak position
U.S. Billboard Top Latin Albums	15
U.S. Billboard Latin Rhythm Albums	1

== See also ==
- List of number-one Billboard Latin Rhythm Albums of 2007
