= Dile (Don Omar song) =

2004 single by Don Omar

Single by Don Omar

from the album The Last Don
- B-side: "Intocable"
- Released: August 2003
- Recorded: 2003
- Genre: Reggaeton; bachata
- Length: 3:25
- Label: Machete
- Songwriter: Eliel Lind
- Producer: Eliel

Don Omar singles chronology
"Dale Don Dale" (2003)	"Dile" (2003)	"Intocable" (2004)

"Dile" (English: "Tell Him") is the first single from Don Omar's debut album, The Last Don (2003). It was released airplay in May 2004, and released in iTunes on July 25, 2005 along with the track "Intocable". The song samples Joe Arroyo's 1988 song "La Noche".

== Chart performance ==
The recording received considerable airplay success. It was charted on all the Latin Billboard singles charts peaking at number 47 on the Billboard Hot Latin Songs, peaking at number 8 on the Tropical Songs and number 37 both on the Latin Pop Songs, as on the Regional Mexican Songs. The song was also charted on the French Singles Chart at number 46, and number 48 on the Swedish Singles Chart.

== Track listings ==
- iTunes digital download
1. "Dile" – 3:25
2. "Intocable" – 2:46
- CD single (European CD)
1. "Dile" (album version) – 3:25
2. "Dale Don Dale" – 3:32
3. "Dale Don Mas Duro" – 2:41
- CD single (maxi CD)
1. "Dile" (album version) – 3:25
2. "Provocandome" (album version) – 2:12
3. "Intocable" (remix by DJ Casanova) – 1:45
4. "Dile" (music video)

== Charts ==
Chart (2004–05)	Peak position
France (SNEP)	46
Sweden (Sverigetopplistan)	48
US Hot Latin Songs (Billboard)	47
US Latin Pop Airplay (Billboard)	37
US Latin Tropical Airplay (Billboard)	8
US Regional Mexican Songs (Billboard)	39

Chart (2010)	Peak position
US Latin Rhythm Digital Songs (Billboard)	8

== Certifications ==
Region	Certification	Certified units/sales
Italy (FIMI) sales since 2009	Gold	50,000^{‡}
Spain (Promusicae)	3× Platinum	180,000^{‡}
^{‡} Sales+streaming figures based on certification alone.

== Release history ==
Region	Date	Format	Label
United States	August 2003	Airplay	Machete
United States	May 1, 2004	CD single	Machete
United States	January 25, 2005	Digital download	Machete
