= Salió el Sol =

"Salió El Sol"

Single by Don Omar

from the album King of Kings
- B-side: "Belly Danza"
- Released: October 5, 2006
- Genre: Reggaeton; dancehall; Latin pop
- Length: 5:15 (album version); 3:27 (radio edit)
- Label: All Star; Universal
- Songwriter: William Landron
- Producers: Echo; Diesel

Don Omar singles chronology
| "Conteo" (2006) | "Salió El Sol" (2006) | "Chillin'" (2006) |

"Salió el Sol" ("The Sun Came Out") is the third single by Don Omar taken from his album King of Kings.

== Music video ==
The music video was released on October 5, 2006. Upon release, the video has managed to surpass over 150 million views on YouTube. The video is also featured on the DVD of the deluxe re-release of King of Kings: Armageddon Edition.

== Chart positions ==
| Chart (2006) | Peak position |
|---|---|
| US Tropical Airplay (Billboard) | 19 |
| US Hot Latin Songs (Billboard) | 13 |
| US Latin Rhythm Airplay (Billboard) | 3 |
| Venezuela Top Latino (Record Report) | 4 |
