= Sexy Robótica =

Single by Don Omar

from the album iDon
- Released: June 5, 2009
- Recorded: 2009
- Genre: Reggaeton, EDM
- Length: 3:54
- Label: Machete, VI
- Songwriters: James Brown, Robert Ginyard, Don Omar
- Producers: Lex, Robin, Danny Fornaris

Don Omar singles chronology
"Virtual Diva" (2009)	"Sexy Robótica" (2009)	"Ciao Bella" (2009)

"Sexy Robótica" is the official second single from iDon, it was released on June 5, 2009, it was originally selected as the first single, back later the producers decided that "Virtual Diva" were the first single and "Sexy Robótica" the second single from iDon.

== Music video ==
The music video was filmed in Miami and was directed by Carlos R. Pérez who also made Virtual Diva music video. The music video reached #1 of the most downloaded on iTunes in the first week of being released.

Don Omar in the music video for "Sexy Robótica".

=== Concept ===
On the video, Vera building downtown Miami was transformed into a mysterious underground complex. Through the video, attractive dancers are a mix of energy and sensual activities represented in several scenes in which Don Omar performs "Sexy Robótica", the music video was released on Don Omar official Universal Music website on July 10.

== Track listing ==
US Digital download

1. "Sexy Robótica" (Album Version) – 3:54

== Charts ==
Chart (2009)	Peak position
Colombia Airplay (EFE)	6
Honduras (EFE)	2
U.S. Billboard Latin Tropical Airplay	6
U.S. Billboard Hot Latin Songs	20
Venezuela Singles Chart	1
Venezuela Latin Chart	1
