= Dale Don Dale =

- Remix cover

Single by Don Omar featuring Glory / Fabolous

from the album The Last Don and Da Hitman Presents Reggaetón Latino
- Released: February 2003 (album version)
- Recorded: 2003 (album version); 2005 (remix)
- Genre: Reggaeton
- Length: 3:22 (album version); 3:35 (remix featuring Fabolous)
- Label: Machete; Universal
- Songwriters: William Landrón; Fabolous (remix only)
- Producers: Luny Tunes; Noriega; Cheka; Swizz Beatz (remix)

Don Omar singles chronology
"Dale Don Dale" (2003)	"Dile" (2004)

"Dale Don Dale" (English: "Hit It Don Hit It") is the track from Don Omar's debut album, The Last Don released in February 2003. The album version features female reggaeton singer Glory. Being the album's first single, "Dale Don Dale" received massive promotion on radio stations of Puerto Rico. The official remix, which features rapper Fabolous was released digitally on November 22, 2005 and included on the 2005 compilation album Da Hitman Presents Reggaetón Latino. The original version of the song has sold over 100,000 copies in Spanish speaking countries. It was nominated for Best Latin/Reggaetón Track at the International Dance Music Awards in 2007, which was ultimately won by Shakira and Wyclef Jean with "Hips Don't Lie".

== Charts ==
Chart (2003–05)	Peak position
Honduras (ACAN-EFE)	10
Spain (PROMUSICAE)	1
US Billboard Tropical Airplay	21
US Billboard Hot Latin Songs; Remix featuring Fabolous	39
US Billboard Hot R&B/Hip-Hop Songs; Remix featuring Fabolous	89

== Release history ==
Region	Date	Format	Label
United States	February 2003	Radio premiere (album version)	Machete
United States	November 22, 2005	Digital download (remix)	Machete
United States	January 10, 2006	12" single	Machete
