= Marcella Place =

American field hockey player

Personal information
- Full name: Marcella Jeanette Place
- Nickname: Marcy
- Born: April 23, 1959 (age 67) Long Beach, California, U.S.
Medal record
Women's Field Hockey
Representing the United States
Olympic Games
Bronze medal – third place	1984 Los Angeles	Team competition

Marcella Jeanette "Marcy" Place (born April 23, 1959) is a former field hockey player from the United States, who was a member of the national team that won the bronze medal at the 1984 Summer Olympics in Los Angeles, California.

Four years later, when Seoul hosted the Summer Games, she finished in eighth position with Team USA. She was affiliated with the California Golden Bears.
