= King of Kings (Don Omar album) =

Studio album by Don Omar
- Released: May 23, 2006
- Genre: Reggaeton
- Length: 69:59
- Labels: Machete Music, VI Music
- Producers: Don Omar; Eliel; Henry R. Santos; Nesty "La Mente Maestra" Nely "El Arma Secreta"; Naldo; Yai & Toly (Los Nativos); Danny Fornaris; Echo & Diesel

Don Omar chronology
Los Bandoleros Reloaded (2006)	King of Kings (2006)	King of Kings Live (2007)

Singles from King of Kings
- 1. "Angelito" Released: May 2, 2006; 2. "Conteo" Released: July 28, 2006; 3. "Salió El Sol" Released: October 5, 2006

Alternative cover
- King of Kings: Armageddon Edition re-edition cover

King of Kings is the second studio album by Puerto Rican rapper Don Omar, released on May 23, 2006, through Machete Music and VI Music. Arriving nearly three years after his debut album, The Last Don (2003), the record represented a pivotal moment in his career and in the broader rise of reggaeton as a commercially dominant Latin music genre. The production of the album explored a variety of sounds beyond reggaeton and hip hop, incorporating dancehall, bhangra and other Caribbean-derived rhythms. It lyrics and themes range from romance, dance-oriented trackts to responses aimed to fellow reggaeton artist and socially conscious comentary. It features guest appearances by Miri Ben-Ari, Juelz Santana, Mackie Ranks, Beenie Man and Zion.

Upon its release, King of Kings achieved major commercial success. It debuted at number one on the Top Latin Albums chart, where it remained for 11 non-consecutive weeks, and entered the Billboard 200 at number seven, becoming one of the highest-charting reggaeton albums in the United States at the time. The record was later certified gold by the Recording Industry Association of America (RIAA) for shipments of 500,000 copies. Also, the album was certified platinum in Chile and gold in Argentina and Spain. It strong sales and chart performance helped solidify Don Omar's crossover appeal beyond the Latin music market.

The album also received significant industry recognition. King of Kings receive positive reviews with Contemporary critics highlighted the album’s use of rock instrumentation and melodic and thematic range. It won Reggaeton Album of the Year at the 2007 Billboard Latin Music Awards and earned a nomination for Best Urban Music Album at the Latin Grammy Awards. Retrospectively, King of Kings has been regarded as one of Don Omar's signature works and as one of the most commercially successful reggaeton albums of its era. In support of the album, Don Omar embarked on the King of Kings World Tour.

== Background ==
Following the success of The Last Don (2003) and the remix compilation The Last Don Live (2004), which had sold more than 200,000 copies combined and earned RIAA certifications, Don Omar began developing King of Kings as a more ambitious and stylistically diverse project. Contemporary reports described the album as an effort to broaden the musical scope of reggaeton, incorporating elements of dancehall, Middle Eastern music, rap and Latin hip hop while further establishing Don Omar as one of the genre’s leading figures. The recording sessions for King of Kings took over a year during 2005–2006 in New York.

Prior to the album’s release, Don Omar portrayed King of Kings as the result of a profound personal and artistic reassessment following a turbulent 2005 marked by legal, professional and personal difficulties. He stated that the project reflected his maturation as a songwriter and his desire to move reggaeton toward more substantive themes. This approach was evident in songs such as “Angelito” and "Muñecas de Porcelana", which were presented as message-driven narratives, as well as in the title track, which Don Omar described as autobiographical and spiritually charged.

In early promotion for King of Kings, Don Omar described the album as reflecting a profound personal and spiritual transformation following a turbulent period in his life. According to contemporary reports, he stated that the record was intended to bring about a positive change in listeners, particularly young people, and to reflect a new direction in both his mindset and artistic outlook. Also, Omar said in an interview in January 2006 that he intended with this album to reclaim his reputation after legal troubles and public feuds with other reggaeton artists.

== Music and Composition ==
The album incorporates a broad range of musical influences beyond conventional reggaeton, including hip hop, dancehall and other Caribbean-derived rhythms. Songs such as “Ojos Chiquitos” were noted for their atmospheric production, while “Belly Danza” departs from the genre’s standard rhythmic formula. In other hand, Contemporary reviewers highlighted the album’s use of rock instrumentation, bhangra rhythms, bachata and ballad-driven arrangements, while singling out tracks such as “Ojitos Chiquitos” for its South Asian-inspired rhythms, “Candela” for its electric guitar-driven production, and “Amarga Vida” for its salsa-bolero style. Other songs, such as “Tú No Sabes” and “Muñecas de Porcelana”, further reflected the album’s melodic and thematic range.

The album’s thematic direction was exemplified by its lead single “Angelito”, which tells the story of a young woman who, after an argument with her boyfriend, goes out partying and contracts HIV following a casual sexual encounter. The song was presented as part of Don Omar’s effort to incorporate more socially conscious and message-driven material into his music.

== Release and promotion ==
As part of the album’s promotional campaign, Machete Music organized a media event at the Biltmore Hotel in Coral Gables, where the Rome-shot video for “Angelito” was unveiled and the artist was recognized with platinum plaques for two million certified career sales. The album was supported by an early mobile-focused promotional campaign in partnership with Cingular Wireless. According to industry reports, King of Kings became the first full-length album released by Machete Music to be cleared for mastertone distribution. As part of the campaign, Don Omar recorded a Cingular “Sound Sessions” performance at the Gibson Amphitheatre in Los Angeles, from which three songs were made available as video downloads and promoted through television and online advertising.

As part of the album’s promotion, the music video for “Angelito” was filmed in Rome under the direction of David Impelluso with a production team of 50 people. Don Omar later described the city as the place where he decided to change the course of his artistic career. Contemporary reports also stated that the initial release of King of Kings was limited to the United States and Puerto Rico, with wider Latin American distribution affected by concerns over piracy in markets such as Mexico, Peru and Venezuela.

The album was released in Japan on September 20, 2006, with two extra tracks, "Cayo El Sol - Tigerstyle Remix" and "La Copa". A special edition known as King of Kings Armageddon Edition was released on December 19, 2006. It include a second disc with four extra songs and a DVD with music videos. A remastered version King of Kings 10th Anniversary (Remastered) was released on November 11, 2016. According to Machete Music, over 500,000 copies were ordered in advance before the release of the album.

Professional ratings
Review scores
Source	Rating
Allmusic	3.5/5 stars

== Critical reception ==
King of Kings receive positive reviews. Reviewers noted the album’s scale and eclecticism. Billboard, ''King of Kings'' was praised for reaching beyond standard club-oriented reggaeton through its use of Middle Eastern motifs, dancehall textures and rap, while also showcasing Don Omar’s lyricism on tracks such as “Angelito”, “Tú No Sabes” and “Amarga Vida”. Though the publication remarked that the album could feel excessive at times, it nonetheless viewed the record as evidence of Don Omar’s staying power as an artist.

Jason Birchmeier from Allmusic, framed the project as a blend of Latin, rap and reggae, specifically classifying it under reggaeton and Latin rap. Ed Morales of Newsday placed the album at number eight on his list of the top 10 Latin CDs of 2006.

== Commercial performance ==
King of Kings debuted in its first week at number seven on the Billboard 200 and number one on Top Latin Albums and Latin Rhythm Album Charts selling over 68,000 copies. The album spent 11 weeks at the peak of Billboard Top Latin Albums in 2006 and was the third-best-selling Latin album in the United States. The album’s commercial success was further reflected in its promotional appearances. Reports from 2006 stated that Don Omar sold 974 copies of King of Kings in three hours during an in-store event at a Best Buy in Orlando, surpassing the 950 units reportedly sold by Britney Spears at a similar appearance. He also signed about 1,200 autographs at the event. On January 29, 2007 the album was certified Gold by the RIAA for shipping 500,000 copies. It ended up at number 8th in the Best of the 2000s on the Latin album chart.As of April 2009, the album sold over 500,000 units in years after, the album sold 556,000 copies in the United States. King of King sold an estimate between over 4,1 million to 6 million copies worldwide.

The album also benefited from the growing Latin mobile music market in the United States. Industry reports noted that between 60 and 70 percent of digital Latin sales in the country came from mobile stores, where urban and rap-oriented tracks performed strongly. Within that context, the lead single “Angelito” reportedly sold close to 400,000 mastertones, more than any other track released by Machete Music at the time.

The album was a commercial success across world. In Spain, the album peaked at number 2 and sold over 50,000 copies. The album was certified Platinum in Chile. In Argentina, the album was certified Gold in two categories, one for album sales and the other for 100,000 mobile downloads.

== Track listing ==
Standard Edition
No.	Title	Production Credits	Length
1.	"Intro - Predica" (featuring Miri Ben-Ari)	Henry Santos & Nesty	3:20
2.	"Repórtense"	Nesty	3:30
3.	"Ojitos Chiquitos"	Fade & Julian, Nesty, Eliel	3:49
4.	"Conteo" (featuring Juelz Santana)	Nely & Naldo	4:00
5.	"Cuéntale"	Eliel	4:21
6.	"Tu No sabes"	Eliel, Naldo & Echo	3:14
7.	"Candela"	Nely & Naldo	5:40
8.	"Salió El Sol"	Echo & Diesel	5:15
9.	"En Su Nota" (featuring Mackie Ranks)	Yai & Toly	3:39
10.	"Angelito"	Eliel	4:44
11.	"Jangueo"	Danny Fornaris	3:53
12.	"Bomba"	Yai & Toly	2:51
13.	"Infieles"	Eliel	4:24
14.	"Belly Danza" (featuring Beenie Man)	Echo & Diesel	4:05
15.	"Muñecas De Porcelana"	Jorge Laboy	3:47
16.	"Not Too Much" (featuring Zion)	Eliel	3:31
17.	"Bailando Sola"	Nely	2:57
18.	"Amarga Vida"	Roberto Allende	2:59
Total length:			1:09:59

19 Tracks Version (Digital Only)
No.	Title	Length
19.	"La Copa (Patea)"	2:00
Total length:		1:11:59

Armageddon Edition
Track #1–18 from standard edition, and includes a second disc and DVD. The song "Conteo" from track 4 does not feature Juelz Santana for this edition.

Disc 2
No.	Title	Production Credits	Length
1.	"Intro - El Rey (diss to Héctor "El Father", Yomo, Polaco)"	Escobar & Fade	3:24
2.	"Ayer La Vi"	Eliel	4:12
3.	"Adiós"	Eliel	4:13
4.	"No Sé De Ella "MySpace"" (featuring Wisin & Yandel)	Eliel	3:43

DVD
No.	Title	Production Credits	Length
1.	"Angelito"	Eliel	4:50
2.	"Salió El Sol"	Diesel	5:33
3.	"Belly Danza" (featuring Beenie Man)	Diesel	6:12
4.	"Conteo"	Naldo	3:26

10th Anniversary (Remastered)
No.	Title	Production Credits	Length
19.	"Te Quiero Pa' Mi" (featuring Zion & Lennox)	Juan Rivera	3:31

== Charts ==
=== Weekly charts ===
Chart (2006–07)	Peak position
Argentina Albums (CAPIF)	9
Mexican Albums (AMPROFON)	84
Spanish Albums (PROMUSICAE)	13
US Billboard 200	7
US Top Latin Albums (Billboard)	1
US Latin Rhythm Albums (Billboard)	1
US Top Rap Albums (Billboard)	1

=== Year-end charts ===
Chart (2006)	Position
US Top Latin Albums (Billboard)	3
Chart (2007)	Position
US Top Latin Albums (Billboard)	8

== Sales and certifications ==
Region	Certification	Certified units/sales
Argentina (CAPIF)	Gold	
Chile	Platinum	
Spain (Promusicae)	Gold	50,000
United States (RIAA)	Gold	556,000

== See also ==
- List of number-one Billboard Latin Rhythm Albums of 2007
