= 2005 Latin Billboard Music Awards =

Annual American music awards ceremony

2005 Billboard Latin Music Awards
- Date: April 28, 2005
- Venue: Miami Arena, Miami, Florida

Below are the winners of the 2005 Billboard Latin Music Awards. The 12th annual event was held April 28 at Florida's Miami Arena and broadcast live on the Telemundo network.

The Billboard Latin Music Awards honor the most popular albums, song, and performers in Latin music, as determined by the actual sales and radio airplay data that shapes Billboard's weekly charts during a one-year period from the issue dated Feb. 14, 2004, through this year's Feb. 5 issue.

== Hot Latin Track Of The Year ==
- Nada Valgo Sin Tu Amor — Juanes (Surco/Universal Latino)

== Hot Latin Track Of The Year, Vocal Duet ==
- Duele El Amor — Aleks Syntek With Ana Torroja (EMI Latin)

== Hot Latin Tracks Artist Of The Year ==
- Paulina Rubio (Universal Latino)

== Songwriter Of The Year ==
- Leonel Garcia

== Producer Of The Year ==
- Rudy Perez

== Latin Pop Album Of The Year, Male ==
- Mi Sangre — Juanes (Surco/Universal Latino)

== Latin Pop Album Of The Year, Female ==
- Pau-Latina — Paulina Rubio (Universal Latino)

== Latin Pop Album Of The Year, Duo Or Group ==
- Fuego — A.B. Quintanilla III Presents Kumbia Kings (EMI Latin)

== Latin Pop Album Of The Year, New Artist ==
- Si — Julieta Venegas (Ariola/BMG Latin)

== Top Latin Albums Artist Of The Year ==
- Los Temerarios (Fonovisa/UG)

== Latin Rock/Alternative Album Of The Year ==
- Street Signs — Ozomatli (Concord Picante/Concord)

== Tropical Album Of The Year, Male ==
- Para Ti — Juan Luis Guerra (Vene/Universal Latino)

== Tropical Album Of The Year, Female ==
- Flor De Amor — Omara Portuondo (World Circuit/Nonesuch/Warner Bros.)

== Tropical Album Of The Year, Duo or Group ==
- Hasta El Fin — Monchy & Alexandra (J&N/Sony Discos)

== Tropical Album Of The Year, New Artist ==
- Recordando Los Terricolas — Michael Stevan (Fonovisa/UG)

== Regional Mexican Album Of The Year, Male Solo Artist ==
- Mexico En La Piel — Luis Miguel (Warner Latina)

== Regional Mexican Album Of The Year, Male Duo Or Group ==
- Za Za Za — Grupo Climax (Musart/Balboa)

== Regional Mexican Album Of The Year, Female Group or Female Solo Artist ==
- Locos De Amor — Los Horoscopos De Durango (Procan/Disa)

== Regional Mexican Album Of The Year, New Artist ==
- Za Za Za — Grupo Climax (Musart/Balboa)

== Latin Greatest Hits Album Of The Year ==
- Dos Grandes — Marco Antonio Solis & Joan Sebastian (Fonovisa/UG)

== Latin Compilation Album Of The Year ==
- Agarron Duranguense — Various Artists (Disa)

== Latin Jazz Album Of The Year ==
- Cositas Buenas — Paco De Lucia (Blue Thumb/GRP)

== Latin Dance Club Play Track Of The Year ==
- Not In Love/No Es Amor (Club Remixes) — Enrique Iglesias (Interscope/Universal Latino)

== Latin Rap/Hip-Hop Album Of The Year ==
- KOMP 104.9 Radio Compa — Akwid (Univision/UG)

== Publisher Of The Year ==
- WB, ASCAP

== Publishing Corporation Of The Year ==
- Warner/Chappell Music Publishing

== Latin Pop Airplay Track Of The Year, Male ==
- Nada Valgo Sin Tu Amor — Juanes (Surco/Universal Latino)

== Latin Pop Airplay Track Of The Year, Female ==
- Te Quise Tanto — Paulina Rubio (Universal Latino)

== Latin Pop Airplay Track Of The Year, Duo or Group ==
- Duele El Amor — Aleks Syntek With Ana Torroja (EMI Latin)

== Latin Pop Airplay Track Of The Year, New Artist ==
- Aunque No Te Pueda Ver — Alex Ubago (Warner Latina)

== Tropical Airplay Track Of The Year, Male ==
- Tengo Ganas — Victor Manuelle (Sony Discos)

== Tropical Airplay Track Of The Year, Female ==
- Tu Fotografia — Gloria Estefan (Epic/Sony Discos)

== Tropical Airplay Track Of The Year, Duo Or Group ==
- Perdidos — Monchy & Alexandra (J&N)

== Tropical Airplay Track Of The Year, New Artist ==
- Quitemonos La Ropa — NG2 (Sony Discos)

== Regional Mexican Airplay Track Of The Year, Male Solo Artist ==
- Nadie Es Eterno — Adan Chalino Sanchez (Moon/Costarola/Sony Discos)

== Regional Mexican Airplay Track Of The Year, Male Group ==
- Esta Llorando Mi Corazon — Beto Y Sus Canarios (Disa)

== Regional Mexican Airplay Track Of The Year, Female Group or Female Solo Artist ==
- Dos Locos — Los Horoscopos De Durango (Procan/Disa)

== Regional Mexican Airplay Track Of The Year, New Artist ==
- Dos Locos — Los Horoscopos De Durango (Procan/Disa)

== Latin Christian/Gospel Album Of The Year ==
- Para Ti — Juan Luis Guerra (Vene/Universal Latino)

== Latin Tour Of The Year ==
- Vicente Fernandez (Sony Discos)

== Reggaeton Album Of The Year ==
- Barrio Fino — Daddy Yankee (El Cartel/VI Music)

== Hot Latin Tracks Label Of The Year ==
- Sony Discos

== Top Latin Albums Label Of The Year ==
- Univision Music Group

== Latin Pop Airplay Label Of The Year ==
- Sony Discos

== Tropical Airplay Label Of The Year ==
- Sony Discos

== Regional Mexican Airplay Label Of The Year ==
- Disa

== Latin Pop Albums Label Of The Year ==
- Sony Discos

== Tropical Albums Label Of The Year ==
- Universal Latino

== Regional Mexican Albums Label Of The Year ==
- Univision Music Group

== Billboard Lifetime Achievement Award ==
- Marco Antonio Solis

== Billboard Spirit Of Hope Award ==
- Juan Luis Guerra

== Telemundo Star Award ==
- Marc Anthony

== Telemundo Viewer's Choice Award ==
- David Bisbal
