= Angelito (Don Omar song) =

Single by Don Omar

from the album King of Kings
- Released: May 2, 2006
- Genre: Alternative reggaeton; ballad
- Length: 4:45
- Label: Machete
- Songwriters: William Landron; Luis Pizzaro
- Producer: Eliel

Don Omar singles chronology
"Bandoleros" (2005)	"Angelito" (2006)	"Conteo" (2006)

"Angelito" ("Little Angel") is the first single by Don Omar taken from his album King of Kings. It reached number one on the Billboard Latin Rhythm Airplay, Hot Latin Tracks and Latin Tropical Airplay charts, peaking at number 93 on the Billboard Hot 100. The song won the Video of the Year award at the Premio Lo Nuestro 2007.

== Meaning of the song ==
"Angelito" is one of the most thematic songs in the history of reggaeton, like "Shorty" (by Randy), "Down" (by Rakim & Ken-Y) and "Todo Tiene Final" (by Arcángel). The meaning of the song is that the "angelito" is a girl who contracted AIDS for a revenge and has sex with a stranger, who is death. At the end of the song, the girl finally dies and has a baby who turns out to be Don Omar—he is remembering the events of the song as an adult.

That's why the song says: "Amaneció bajo las alas de la muerte, aquellos brazos de hombre que la aprietan fuerte, todavía le late el alma, el corazón no lo siente" [...] "Dos extraños jugando a quererse, en lo oscuro el amor no puede verse, es que tengas la vida de frente es morir o detente" [...] "Esta es la feliz historia de dos enamorados, de dos soñadores, de dos amantes, que permitieron que tan solo un minuto de su vida decidiera el resto de la misma, irónico el momento en el que el amor se convierte en muerte".

== Music video ==
The music video was filmed in Rome, featuring many of the city's historic landmarks directed by David Impelluso.

== Charts ==
=== Weekly charts ===
Chart (2006)	Peak position
Colombia (National-Report)	5
US Billboard Hot 100	93
US Hot Latin Songs (Billboard)	1
US Billboard Latin Tropical Airplay	1
US Venezuela Top Latino (Record Report)	4

=== Year-end charts ===
Chart (2006)	Position
US Hot Latin Songs (Billboard)	8

== Sales and certifications ==
Region	Certification	Certified units/sales
United States (RIAA) Mastertone	Gold	500,000^{*}
^{*} Sales figures based on certification alone.

== See also ==
- List of Billboard Latin Rhythm Airplay number ones of 2006
