= Don Omar =

Puerto Rican rapper (born 1978)

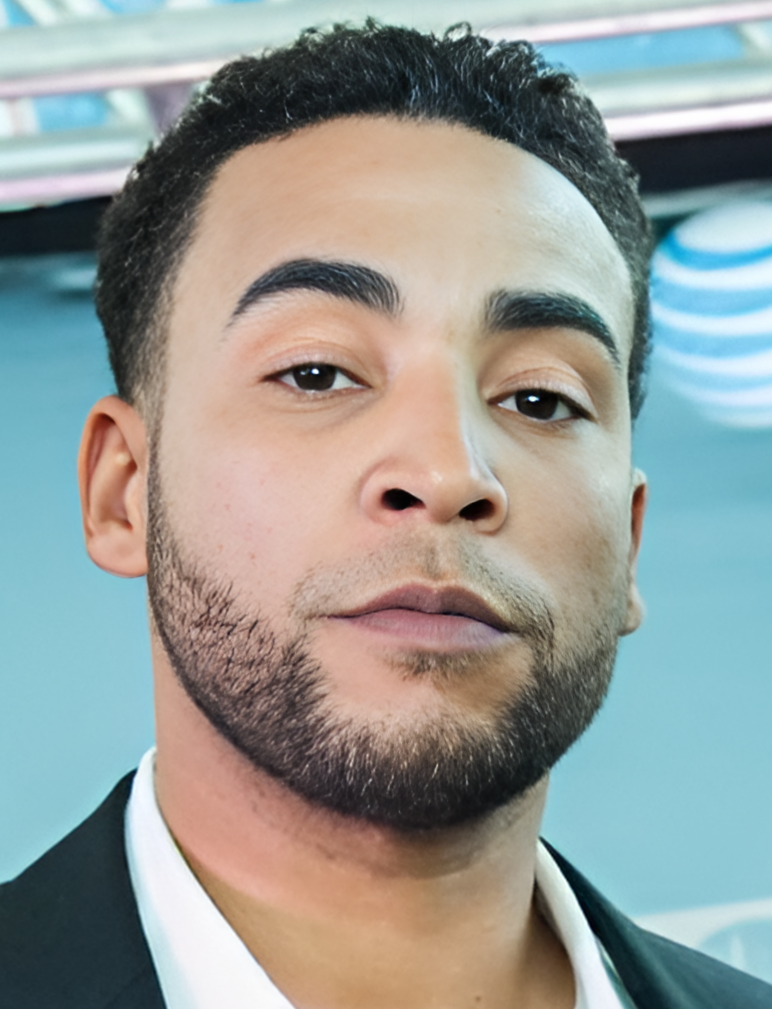
- Don Omar in 2015 promoting The Kingdom Tour

Background information
- Also known as: El Rey (The King); King of Kings; Kong
- Born: William Omar Landrón Rivera; February 10, 1978 (age 48); Santurce, San Juan, Puerto Rico
- Genres: Reggaeton; hip-hop; latin hip-hop; urban pop
- Occupations: Rapper; singer; songwriter; record producer; actor
- Works: Don Omar discography
- Years active: 1996–2017; 2019–present
- Labels: Orfanato; VI; Universal Latino; Machete
- Website: donomar.com (in Spanish)
- Awards: Full list

Signature
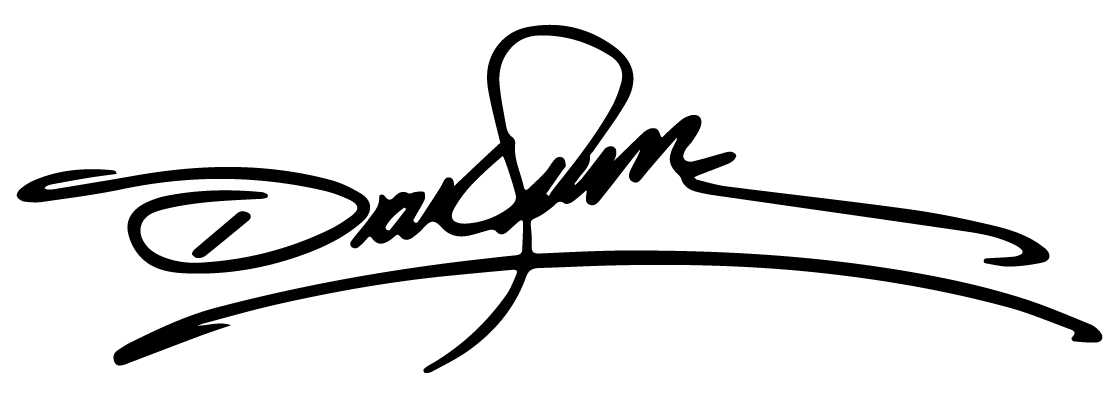

William Omar Landrón Rivera (born 10 February 1978) known professionally as Don Omar, is a Puerto Rican rapper, singer, songwriter, record producer, and actor. Dubbed the "King of Reggaeton" by music critics and fans alike, he has also been recognized by Billboard and Rolling Stone as a reggaeton legend. He is often cited as an influence by other Hispanic urban performers.

Landrón was born in Santurce, a neighborhood of San Juan, Puerto Rico. He is one of the artists credited with presenting reggaeton to audiences around the world and having turned the musical genre into a global phenomenon. He jumped to stardom with the release of his first studio album, The Last Don, released in 2003. The album sold 411,000 units in the United States and was certified gold by the Recording Industry Association of America (RIAA). Since then, he has sold around 70 million records, making him one of the best-selling Latin music artists, having sold 100 billion units. On September 1, 2017, after a long musical career he announced that he would retire after a series of concerts at the José Miguel Agrelot Coliseum in Puerto Rico, scheduled to be held on December 15, 16 and 17. However, he returned to music on April 20, 2019, with his song single "Ramayama" featuring Farruko.

During his career, Don Omar earned numerous accolades, including two Latin Grammy Awards, one Billboard Music Awards, seventeen Billboard Latin Music Awards, three Lo Nuestro Awards, eight Viña del Mar International Song Festival Awards, among others.

Don Omar has also portrayed Rico Santos in four films in the Fast & Furious franchise. He first played the character in 2009's Fast & Furious and then returned for Fast Five (2011), The Fate of the Furious (2017) and F9 (2021).

== Early life ==
Don Omar was born on 10 February 1978 in Santurce, a neighborhood of San Juan, Puerto Rico, where he was raised, the oldest son of William Landrón and Luz Antonia Rivera. From an early age, he showed interest in the music of Vico C and Brewley MC. During his youth, he became an active member of a Protestant church, Iglesia Evangélica Restauración en Cristo in Bayamón where he occasionally offered sermons. However, after four years, he left the church to dedicate himself to singing.

== Career ==
His first public performance in a night club was accompanied by disc jockey Eliel Lind Osorio. Afterwards, he appeared regularly on compilation albums from popular DJs and producers including Luny Tunes, Noriega, and DJ Eric. He also worked as a backup singer for the duo Héctor & Tito. One of the members, Héctor el Father, helped him produce his first solo album.

Omar's career rose to stardom with the release of his first studio album, The Last Don with Frankie Needles. Both the studio version and its live edition have been certified platinum by the Recording Industry Association of America. Worldwide, The Last Don: Live [CD & DVD] has sold over one million copies, according to his official website. He earned awards for Latin Pop Album of the Year and New Artist & Latin Rap/Hip-Hop Album of the Year by the Billboard Latin Music Awards in 2003. The Last Don: Live [CD & DVD] was also nominated for Urban Music Album at the 2005 Latin Grammy Awards.

In 2005, Don Omar featured on rapper Cuban Link's hit single "Scandalous" which peaked at number 45 on the Billboard Hot Latin Tracks chart. The song was released as the second single to Cuban's second and official debut album Chain Reaction.

Omar's May 2006 album King of Kings, became history's highest ranking reggaeton LP in the top 10 US charts, with its debut at number one on the Latin sales charts and the number one spot on the Billboard Latin Rhythm Radio Chart with his single "Angelito". Omar was also able to beat the in-store appearance sales record at Disney World's Virgin Megastore previously set by pop star Britney Spears.

With the highest charting debut by a reggaeton artist, Omar's King of Kings entered at No. 7 with 74,000 beating. In April 2007, Don Omar received the Billboard Latin Music Award for Reggaeton Album of the Year for King of Kings. Billboard recognized that King of Kings was the most successful album of the decade in Latin America, besides being the most successful in the history of the genre of reggaeton. Billboard estimated that the album sold over 4.1 million copies by the end of 2009.

Omar participated in Gilberto Santa Rosa's presentation in an event titled "Concierto del Amor", presented in the Madison Square Garden on February 9, 2008. He closed the event and performed reggaeton themes with Frankie Needles.

Omar's third studio album, iDon, was released on April 28, 2009. This album is of Sold over 2.5 million. "Virtual Diva" became the most requested song on Latin radio stations. The second official single, titled "Sexy Robótica", was released on July 6, 2009.

The album Don Omar Presents: Meet the Orphans was released on November 16, 2010. The album features the artists under Don Omar's Orfanato Music Group label and other reggaeton artists. The album includes the promotional single "Hasta Abajo" and the album's lead single "Danza Kuduro" featuring Portuguese-French singer Lucenzo, as well as collaborations from Orfanato Music Group artists including Kendo Kaponi, Syko, Plan B, Zion & Lennox, Yaga & Mackie and Danny Fornaris. "Danza Kuduro" appears on the Fast Five soundtrack and is the song played at the conclusion of the movie. He is signed to VI Music and Machete Music through Universal Music Latino. The album sold over 3 million.

The album Don Omar Presents MTO²: New Generation was released on May 1, 2012. The album features newly signed to Orfanato Music Group Natti Natasha as well as many other signed artists and other reggaeton artists like Zion & Lennox. The album includes the singles "Hasta Que Salga el Sol", which won the award for Best Urban Song at the 2012 Latin Grammy Awards, and "Dutty Love" featuring Natti Natasha, which was also nominated. The album also features collaborations with Juan Magán, Mims, Syko, Vinny el Vendito, and Yunel Cruz. The album has been well received as it won the award for Best Urban Music Album at the 2012 Latin Grammy Awards.

After a decade-long rivalry feud with fellow artist Daddy Yankee for the "King of Reggaeton" title, in early 2016 Daddy Yankee and Don Omar announced in a Billboard press conference that they would perform together on stage in a concert series called The Kingdom Tour. The tour announcement left many fans in disbelief, while selling out in minutes in cities like Las Vegas, Orlando, Los Angeles, New York. Discussing the tour and his rivalry with Daddy Yankee, Don Omar said "Let me clarify: I am not his best friend, and he is not my best friend, but we respect each other. That desire to be the best is what has pushed us to be better."

In 2019, he released his sixth studio album "The Last Album".

In September 2021, Omar signed a multi-year partnership with Saban Music Group. In February 2022, Omar was announced as a headliner of the 2022 Los Della Festival in San Bernardino, California.

In 2023 Omar released his seventh studio album "Forever King". The album debuted at number 40 on the Top Latin Albums, and was certified Platinum (Latin) by Recording Industry Association of America. The album was recognized at number four on "The 23 Best Latin Albums of 2023" on magazine Billboard. Additionally, it was listed among The Best Albums of 2023 by magazine Rolling Stone en Español, the November 2, released single "Sandunga" with Wisin & Yandel. The single has #10 Latin Airplay.

== Personal life ==
In 2003, Omar had his first son, Nicolás Valle Gómez. Omar married forecaster/journalist Jackie Guerrido on April 19, 2008. In March 2011, it was revealed they had divorced.

Omar made homophobic jokes about Ozuna on social media in January 2019, a move which was criticized by many, including Bad Bunny.

On June 17, 2024, Omar posted on his Instagram a picture of his arm with an Orlando Health wristband on, stating in the caption that he has cancer. He ended off the caption with the words "See you soon," then the hashtag "#fuckcancer."

Just a day after the post regarding his cancer diagnosis, Omar announced he was cancer free. "Today I woke up cancer free and grateful," said Omar.

== Legal issues ==
On September 18, 2007, Omar was briefly detained in Santa Cruz de la Sierra, Bolivia due to a legal dispute. A Bolivian concert promoter sued him and some of his management after he canceled a concert scheduled for earlier that year in La Paz as part of the international tour Up Close. The organization claimed that he had defrauded US$70,000 due to the cancellation. Omar responded that he canceled the concert because the company did not provide air tickets in time. After the case was presented before a local judge, both parties reached an agreement. Omar was allowed to leave the country in order to comply with a previously scheduled appearance in Buenos Aires on Argentine television and returned the next day to hold his concert in Santa Cruz's Tahuichi Aguilera football stadium.

== Awards and nominations ==
Puerto Rican rapper Don Omar has won 40 awards from 90 nominations, being one of the most successful artists of the genre. He has been nominated for 13 Latin Grammy Awards, 23 Billboard Latin Music Awards, 4 Billboard Music Awards, 19 Lo Nuestro Awards, 4 International Dance Music Awards, 2 American Music Awards, 2 Premios People en Español, 2 MTV Video Music Awards and 1 Premio MTV Latinoamérica. He has received 2 Latin Grammy Awards, 17 Billboard Latin Music Awards, 1 Billboard Music Award, 3 Lo Nuestro Awards, 8 Viña del Mar International Song Festival Awards and 1 Guinness World Record.

He released 7 studio albums between 2003 and 2018, including the Billboard Latin Music Award winner King of Kings (2006) for the Reggaeton Album of the Year. Rivera was also responsible for the production of his 4 collaboration albums, including the Latin Grammy Award winner Meet the Orphans 2: New Generation (2012) for Best Urban Music Album. The artist made record in the history for Billboard. The artist earned a Guinness World Record in 2011 for the Spanish-language YouTube video with the most views.

== Discography ==
=== Studio albums ===
- The Last Don (2003)
- King of Kings (2006)
- iDon (2009)
- Meet the Orphans (2010)
- MTO²: New Generation (2012)
- The Last Don 2 (2015)
- The Last Album (2019)
- Forever King (2023)

=== Live albums ===
- The Last Don Live (2004)
- King of Kings: Live (2007)

=== Compilation & Greatest Hits albums ===
- Los Bandoleros (2005)
- Da Hitman Presents Reggaetón Latino (2005)
- Los Bandoleros Reloaded (2006)
- El Pentágono (2007)
- El Pentágono: The Return (2008)

== Concert tours ==
- The Last World Tour
- King of Kings World Tour (2006-2007)
- iDon World Tour
- Meet the Orphans World Tour
- MTO²: New Generation World Tour
- Hecho en Puerto Rico
- Retro Evolución World Tour
- The Kingdom Tour (2015-2016)
- Back to Reggaeton Tour (2024-25)
- The Last King World Tour (2026)

== Filmography ==
| † | Denotes films/television series that have not yet been released |

| Year | Title | Role |
|---|---|---|
| 2007 | MTV Cribs | Himself |
| 2009 | Fast & Furious | Rico Santos |
| 2009 | Los Bandoleros | Rico Santos |
| 2011 | Fast Five | Rico Santos |
| 2017 | The Fate of the Furious | Rico Santos |
| 2021 | F9 | Rico Santos |

== See also ==
- List of best-selling Latin music artists
- List of Puerto Ricans
