= Lo Nuestro Award for Grupero Artist of the Year =

Latin music award

Lo Nuestro Awards for Grupero Artist of the Year
- Current: Premio Lo Nuestro 2015
- Awarded for: Grupero Artist of the Year
- Country: United States
- Presented by: Univision
- First award: 2001
- Currently held by: Tierra Cali (2015)

Highlights
- Most awards: Los Temerarios (6)
- Most nominations: Los Temerarios (8)
- Website: univision.com/premiolonuestro

The Lo Nuestro Award for Grupero Artist of the Year is an award presented annually by American network Univision. It was first awarded in 2001 and has been given annually since. The accolade was established to recognize the most talented performers of Latin music. The nominees and winners were originally selected by a voting poll conducted among program directors of Spanish-language radio stations in the United States and also based on chart performance on Billboard Latin music charts, with the results being tabulated and certified by the accounting firm Deloitte. At the present time, the winners are selected by the audience through an online survey. The trophy awarded is shaped in the form of a treble clef.

The award was first presented to Mexican singer Joan Sebastian in 2001. Mexican group Los Temerarios hold the most wins and most nominations with 6 out of eight nominations. Fellow Mexican group Bronco - El Gigante de América is the most nominated act without a win, with six unsuccessful nominations. Mexican singer, Alicia Villarreal is the only female act to have won the accolade.

== Winners and nominees ==
Listed below are the winners of the award for each year, as well as the other nominees for the majority of the years awarded.

Key	Meaning
‡	Indicates the winner

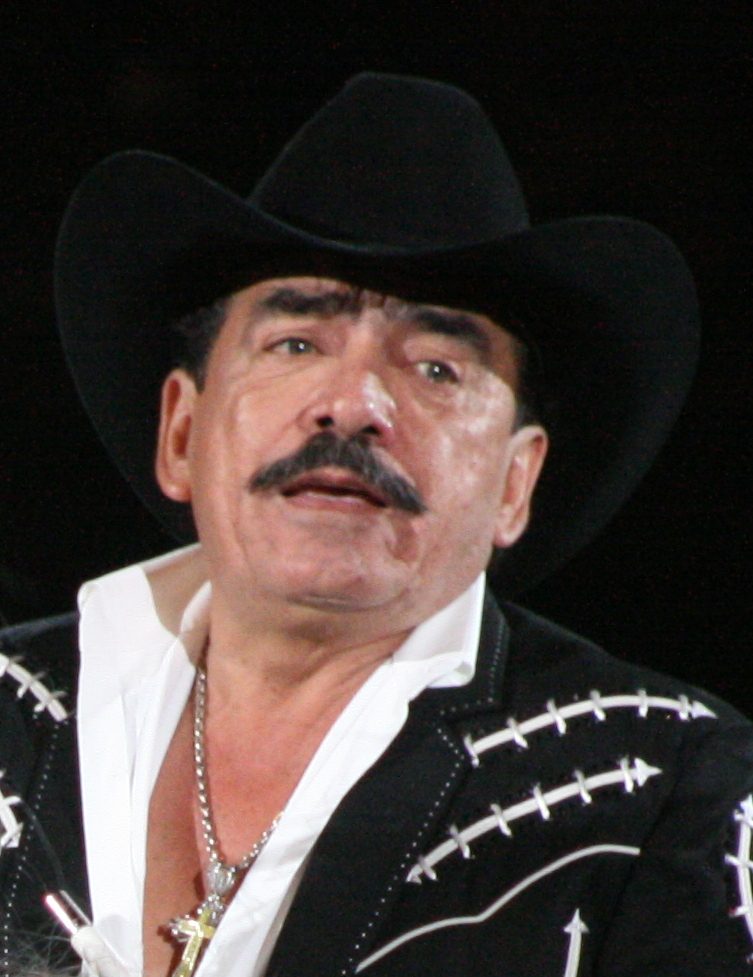
Mexican singer Joan Sebastian (pictured in 2009), winner in 2001 and 2011

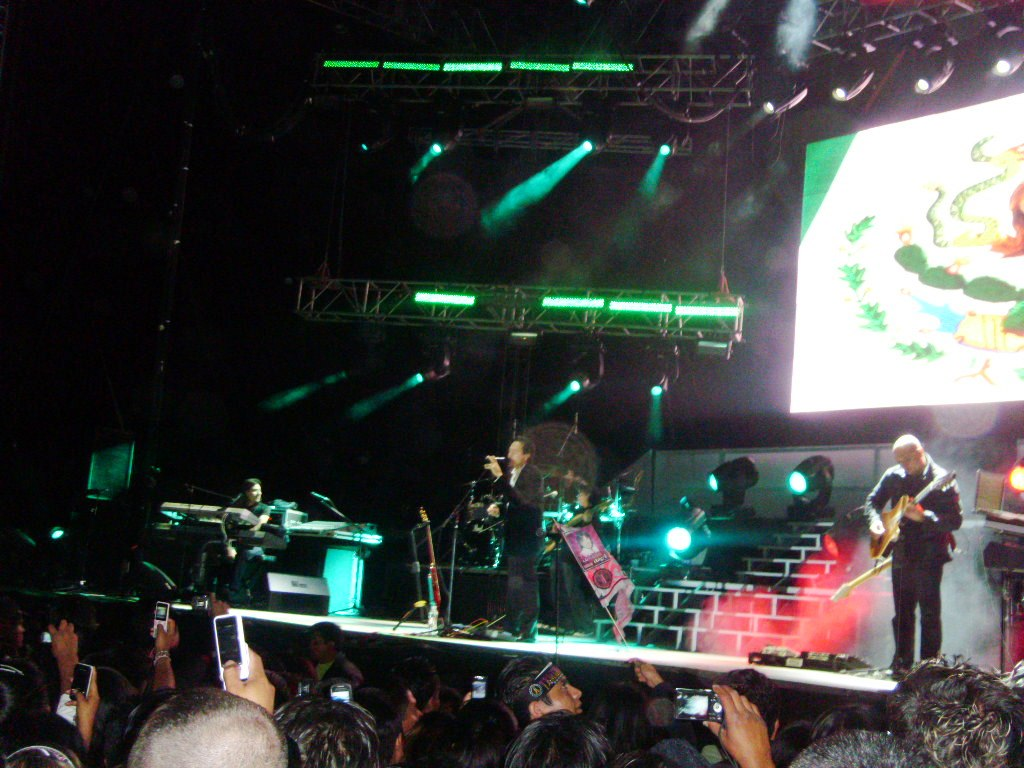
Mexican group Los Temerarios (pictured in 2010), winner in 2002, 2003, 2004, 2006, 2007, and 2014

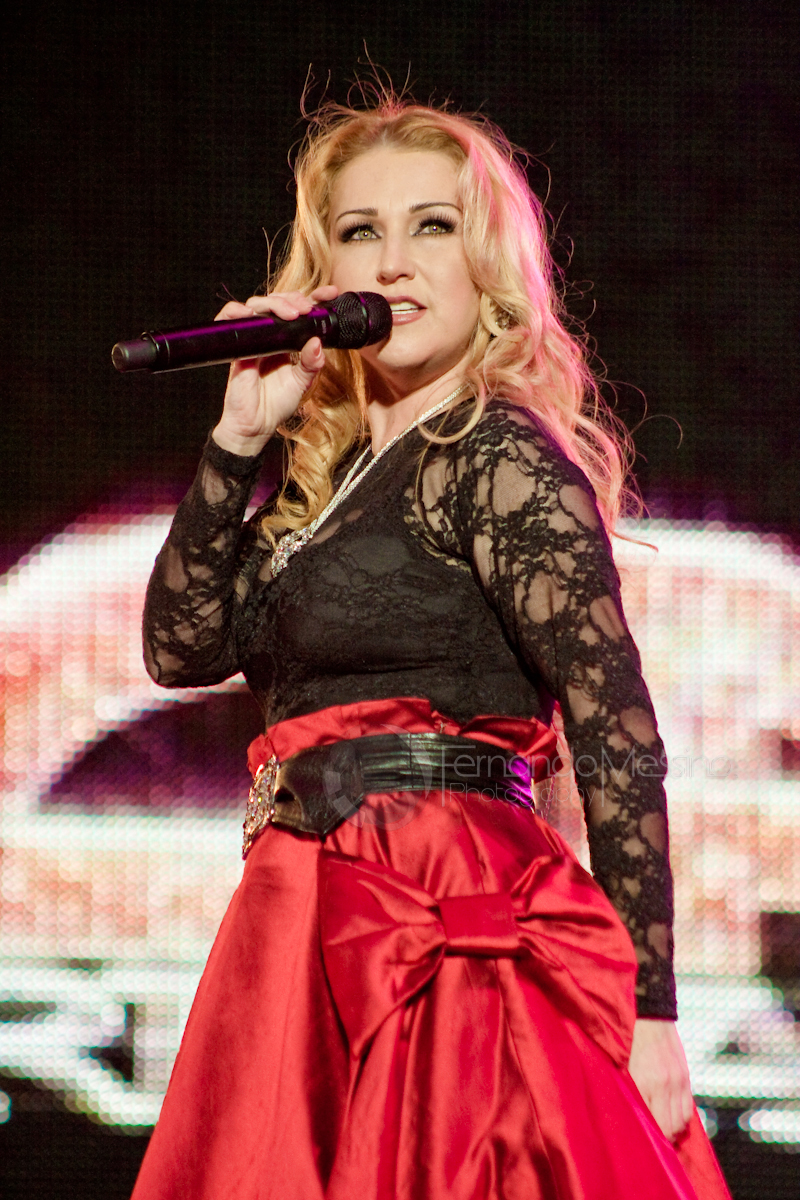
Mexican singer Alicia Villarreal (pictured in 2010), winner in 2005

Year	Performer	Ref
2001 (13th)	Joan Sebastian‡	
2001 (13th)	Los Ángeles de Charly	
2001 (13th)	Grupo Bryndis	
2001 (13th)	Límite	
2002 (14th)	Los Temerarios‡	
2002 (14th)	Los Angeles Azules	
2002 (14th)	Grupo Bryndis	
2002 (14th)	Joan Sebastian	
2003 (15th)	Los Temerarios‡	
2003 (15th)	Alberto and Roberto	
2003 (15th)	Liberación	
2003 (15th)	Joan Sebastian	
2004 (16th)	Los Temerarios‡	
2004 (16th)	Límite	
2004 (16th)	Bronco - El Gigante de América	
2004 (16th)	Socios del Ritmo	
2005 (17th)	Alicia Villarreal‡	
2005 (17th)	Bronco - El Gigante de América	
2005 (17th)	Joan Sebastian	
2005 (17th)	Los Temerarios	
2006 (18th)	Los Temerarios‡	
2006 (18th)	Marco Antonio Solís	
2006 (18th)	Bronco - El Gigante de América	
2006 (18th)	Grupo Innovación	
2007 (19th)	Los Temerarios‡	
2007 (19th)	Bronco - El Gigante de América	
2007 (19th)	Grupo Bryndis	
2007 (19th)	Victor Garcia	
2008 (20th)	Marco Antonio Solís‡	
2008 (20th)	Bronco - El Gigante de América	
2008 (20th)	Grupo Bryndis	
2008 (20th)	Control	
2009 (21st)	Marco Antonio Solís‡	
2009 (21st)	Bronco - El Gigante de América	
2009 (21st)	Control	
2009 (21st)	Grupo Bryndis	
2009 (21st)	Los Temerarios	
2010 (22nd)	Marco Antonio Solís‡	
2010 (22nd)	Control	
2010 (22nd)	Huichol Musical	
2010 (22nd)	La Nobleza de Aguililla	
2010 (22nd)	Los Pikadientes de Caborca	
2011 (23rd)	Joan Sebastian‡	
2011 (23rd)	Marco Antonio Solís	
2011 (23rd)	La Mar-K de Tierra Caliente	
2011 (23rd)	Tierra Cali	
2012 (24th)	Marco Antonio Solís‡	
2012 (24th)	Grupo Bryndis	
2012 (24th)	La Mar-k de Tierra Caliente	
2012 (24th)	Tierra Cali	
2013 (25th)	Grupo Bryndis‡	
2013 (25th)	La Nobleza de Aguililla	
2013 (25th)	Los Primos de Durango	
2013 (25th)	Tierra Cali	
2014 (26th)	Los Temerarios‡	
2014 (26th)	Los Ángeles Azules	
2014 (26th)	La Nobleza de Aguililla	
2014 (26th)	Los Primos MX	
2015 (27th)	Tierra Cali‡	
2015 (27th)	Los Primos MX	
2015 (27th)	La Nobleza de Aguililla	
2015 (27th)	El Trono de México	

== See also ==
- Latin Grammy Award for Best Grupero Album
