= Premio Lo Nuestro 2013 =

Latin Music awards show

25th Lo Nuestro Awards
- Date: February 21, 2013
- Site: American Airlines Arena; Miami, Florida, USA
- Hosted by: Ninel Conde, Pedro Fernández
- Preshow hosts: Giselle Blondet, Alan Tacher
- Produced by: Antonio Guzmán

Highlights
- Artist of the Year: Jenni Rivera
- Most awards: Prince Royce (6)
- Most nominations: Prince Royce and Romeo Santos (7)

Television coverage
- Network: Univision
- Duration: 3 hours
- Ratings: 6.4 million (Nielsen ratings)

The 25th Lo Nuestro Awards ceremony, presented by the American network Univision, honored the best Latin music of 2012 in the United States and took place on February 21, 2013, at the American Airlines Arena in Miami, Florida beginning at 5:00 p.m. PST/ 8:00 p.m. EST. During the ceremony, Lo Nuestro Awards were presented in 33 categories. The ceremony, televised in the United States by Univision, was produced by Antonio Guzmán. Mexican performers Ninel Conde and Pedro Fernández hosted the show.

Mexican-American singer Jenni Rivera earned five awards including Artist of the Year; a posthumous tribute for her was held in the ceremony and featured performances by singers Olga Tañón, Lupillo Rivera, Shaila Dúrcal, Diana Reyes and María José. American artist Prince Royce received six accolades. Multiple winners also included Mexican bands 3BallMTY, Jesse & Joy, Maná, Gerardo Ortíz, and Puerto Rican-American duo Wisin & Yandel. To further celebrate the twenty-fifth anniversary of the Lo Nuestro Awards, Dominican singer-songwriter Juan Luis Guerra presented a medley of songs performed by him on previous ceremonies, and Colombian singer Carlos Vives premiered his single "Volví a Nacer", ten years after his last appearance at the show. The telecast garnered more than 6.4 million viewers in North America.

== Winners and nominees ==
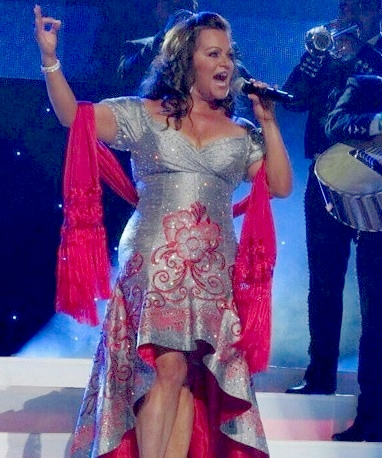
Mexican-American singer Jenni Rivera (pictured in 2012) won five Lo Nuestro Awards and received a posthumous tribute by various artists at the ceremony.

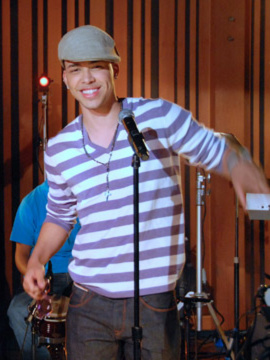
American singer Prince Royce (pictured in 2012), earned six Lo Nuestro Awards, the most for any performer in 2013.

The nominees for the 25th Lo Nuestro Awards were announced on December 2, 2012, during the morning show ¡Despierta América!. American singers Romeo Santos and Prince Royce received the highest number of nominations, with seven each; Santos and Royce were nominated against each other in three categories in the Tropical field, including Album, Song and Artist of the Year. The winners were announced before the live audience during the ceremony, with Mexican-American singer Jenni Rivera being one of the most awarded performers, earning five accolades, including Pop Album (Joyas Prestadas (Pop)), Pop Song ("A Cambio de Qué"), Pop and Regional Mexican Female Artist, and Artist of the Year. Rivera's two oldest daughters, Chiquis and Jacqie, collected her awards, after the singer's death on December 9, 2012.

Royce became the night's biggest winner, receiving six accolades, four in the Tropical Field (Album, Song, Male Artist and Traditional Performance), and a further two for his duet with Mexican band Maná (Collaboration of the Year and Rock/Alternative Song). Maná dominated the Rock Field, also receiving Rock/Alternative Album and Rock/Alternative Artist for a total of four. Mexican band Jesse & Joy was nominated five times and won for Pop Duo or Group and Video of the Year for "¡Corre!", which also was named Record and Song of the Year at the 13th Latin Grammy Awards.

Puerto Rican-American singer Olga Tañón was awarded for Tropical Female Artist, her twenty-third Lo Nuestro accolade, the most for any performer in the award show's history. Líderes by reggaeton duo Wisin & Yandel was the Urban Album of the Year. Upon release the album reached number-one on the Billboard Top Latin Albums chart. Mexican band 3Ball MTY won for New Artist, after winning the same award at the Latin Grammys; their record Inténtalo was the third-best selling Latin album of 2012 in the United States and received the Lo Nuestro for Regional Mexican Album. The Lifetime Achievement award was earned by Mexican performer Pedro Fernández, also the host of the evening. Spanish singer-songwriter Alejandro Sanz was the recipient of the Excellence Award and was selected as the Pop Male Artist of the Year.

Winners are listed first and indicated with a double-dagger (‡).

Artist of the Year	Collaboration of the Year
Jenni Rivera‡; Don Omar; La Arrolladora Banda El Limón de René Camacho; Maná; Romeo Santos	Maná featuring Prince Royce – "El Verdadero Amor Perdona"‡; Don Omar featuring Natti Natasha – "Dutty Love"; Jesse & Joy featuring La Republika – "¡Corre!"; Juan Magán featuring Pitbull and El Cata – "Bailando Por El Mundo"; Romeo Santos featuring Tomatito – "Mi Santa"
New Artist of the Year	Video of the Year
3Ball MTY‡; Kary Hernández; Juan Magán; Henry Santos	Jesse & Joy – "¡Corre!"‡; Beto Cuevas featuring Flo Rida – "Quiero Creer"; Laura Pausini – "Jamás Abandoné"; Alejandro Sanz – "No Me Compares"; Wisin & Yandel featuring Jennifer Lopez – "Follow the Leader"
Pop Album	Pop Song
Jenni Rivera – Joyas Prestadas (Pop)‡; Ricardo Arjona – Independiente; Jesse & Joy – ¿Con Quién Se Queda El Perro?; Paulina Rubio – Brava!; Alejandro Sanz – La Música No Se Toca	Jenni Rivera – "A Cambio de Qué"‡; Ricardo Arjona and Gaby Moreno – "Fuiste Tú"; Espinoza Paz – "Un Hombre Normal"; Jesse & Joy – "¡Corre!"; Paulina Rubio – "Me Gustas Tanto"
Pop Male Artist	Pop Female Artist
Alejandro Sanz‡; Ricardo Arjona; Franco De Vita; Luis Fonsi	Jenni Rivera‡; Paulina Rubio; Shakira; Gloria Trevi
Pop Duo or Group
Jesse & Joy‡; Camila; Da'Zoo; Reik
Rock/Alternative Album	Rock/Alternative Song
Maná – Exiliados en la Bahía: Lo Mejor de Maná‡; Black Guayaba – La Conexión; Beto Cuevas – Transformación; Juanes – Juanes MTV Unplugged	Maná featuring Prince Royce – "El Verdadero Amor Perdona"‡; Beto Cuevas featuring Flo Rida – "Quiero Creer"; Juanes – "La Señal"; Juanes – "Me Enamora (MTV Unplugged version)"; Maná – "Hasta Que Te Conocí"
Rock/Alternative Artist
Maná‡; Beto Cuevas; Alejandra Guzmán; Juanes
Regional Mexican Album	Regional Mexican Song
3Ball MTY – Inténtalo‡; La Addictiva Banda San José de Mesillas – Nada Iguales; La Arrolladora Banda El Limón de René Camacho – Irreversible... 2012; Julión Álvarez – Márchate y Olvídame; Banda el Recodo – La Mejor de Todas	Gerardo Ortíz – "Amor Confuso"‡; La Arrolladora Banda El Limón de René Camacho – "Llamada de Mi Ex"; Banda el Recodo – "Te Quiero a Morir"; La Original Banda El Limón de Salvador Lizárraga – "El Mejor Perfume"; Fidel Rueda – "Tu Ya Eres Cosa del Pasado"
Regional Mexican Male Artist	Regional Mexican Female Artist
Espinoza Paz‡; Julión Álvarez; Gerardo Ortíz; Fidel Rueda	Jenni Rivera‡; Shaila Dúrcal; Ely Quintero; Diana Reyes
Regional Mexican Group	Norteño Artist
La Arrolladora Banda El Limón de René Camacho‡; La Addictiva Banda San José de Mesillas; Calibre 50; La Original Banda El Limón de Salvador Lizárraga	Gerardo Ortíz‡; Calibre 50; Pesado; Voz de Mando
Duranguense Artist	Grupero Artist
Grupo Montéz de Durango‡; La Apuesta; Conjunto Atardecer; El Trono de México	Grupo Bryndis‡; La Nobleza de Aguililla; Los Primos de Durango; Tierra Cali
Ranchero Artist	Banda Artist
Pedro Fernández‡; Pepe Aguilar; Shaila Dúrcal; Vicente Fernández	Banda el Recodo‡; La Addictiva Banda San José de Mesillas; La Arrolladora Banda El Limón de René Camacho; La Original Banda El Limón de Salvador Lizárraga
Tropical Album	Tropical Song
Prince Royce – Phase II‡; Chino & Nacho – Supremo; Elvis Crespo – Los Monsters; Romeo Santos – Formula, Vol. 1; Víctor Manuelle – Busco un Pueblo	Prince Royce – "Incondicional"‡; Prince Royce – "Las Cosas Pequeñas"; Romeo Santos – "La Diabla"; Romeo Santos featuring Tomatito – "Mi Santa"; Víctor Manuelle – "Si Tú Me Besas"
Tropical Male Artist	Tropical Female Artist
Prince Royce‡; Romeo Santos; Tito El Bambino; Víctor Manuelle	Olga Tañón‡; Ambar; Fanny Lú; Leslie Grace
Merengue Artist	Salsa Artist
Juan Luis Guerra‡; Elvis Crespo; Juan Luis Juancho; Eddy Herrera	Víctor Manuelle‡; Luis Enrique; Tito Nieves; Jerry Rivera
Tropical Duo or Group	Traditional Performance
Chino & Nacho‡; Grupo Treo; La Republika; Vena	Prince Royce‡; Chino & Nacho; Romeo Santos; Tito El Bambino
Urban Album of the Year	Urban Song of the Year
Wisin & Yandel – Líderes‡; Baby Rasta & Gringo – Los Duros; Daddy Yankee – Prestige; Don Omar – Don Omar Presents MTO²: New Generation; Juan Magán – Juan Magán Presents: Bailando Por El Mundo	Daddy Yankee – "Lovumba"‡; Don Omar – "Hasta Que Salga el Sol"; Don Omar featuring Natti Natasha – "Dutty Love"; Gocho – "Si Te Digo la Verdad"; Juan Magán featuring Pitbull and El Cata – "Bailando Por El Mundo"
Urban Artist of the Year
Wisin & Yandel‡; Daddy Yankee; Don Omar; Juan Magán

== Ceremony information ==
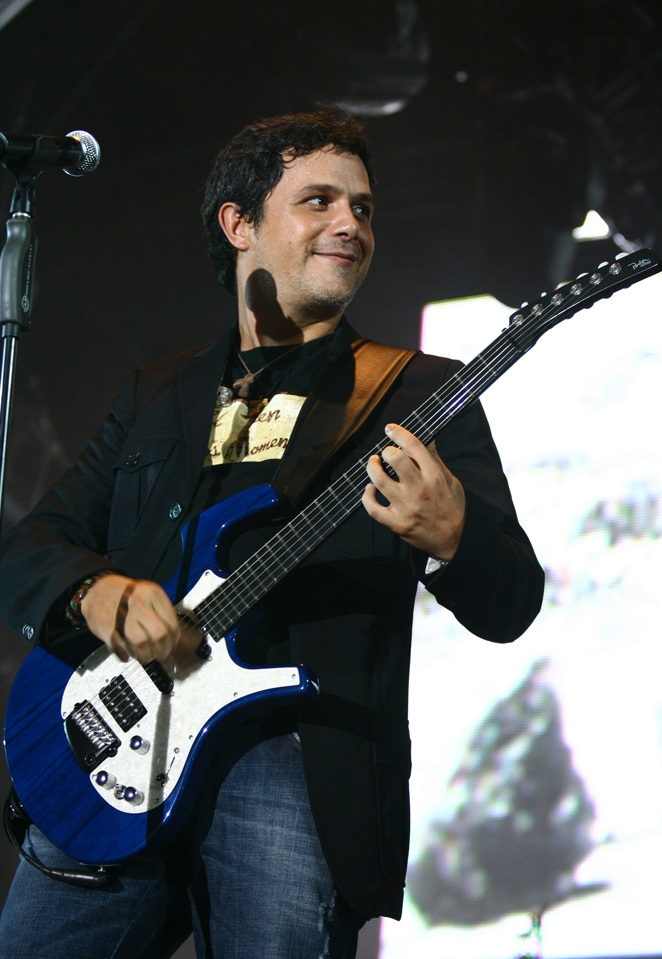
Spanish singer Alejandro Sanz (pictured in 2007) was named Male Pop Artist and also received the Lifetime Achievement Award.

=== Categories and voting process ===
The categories considered were for the Pop, Tropical, Regional Mexican, and Urban genres, with additional awards for the General Field that includes nominees from all the genres for the Artist of the Year, Collaboration, Video and New Artist categories. The nominees were selected through an online voting poll that received 500,000 votes; the winners were chosen from a total of 130 nominations in 33 different categories.

Presenters (in order of appearance)

Presenter(s)	Category
Mariana Seoane; Gabriel Soto	Presenters of the award for Regional Mexican Group
Cristián de la Fuente; Chiquinquirá Delgado	Presenters of the awards for Pop Female Artist
Juan Magán; Maité Perroni	Presenters of the award for Merengue Artist
Alicia Machado; Zuleyka Rivera	Presenters of the award for Pop Male Artist
Fanny Lú; Beto Cuevas	Presenters of the award for Salsa Artist
Gilberto Santa Rosa; Lorena Rojas	Presenters of the award for Regional Mexican Album
Ninel Conde	Presenter of the Lifetime Achievement Award
Ricky Martin	Presenter of the Excellence Award
Leslie Grace; Julión Alvarez	Presenters of the Video of the Year
Lupita Jones; Julián Gil	Presenters of the Tropical Artist (Duo or Group)
Argelia Atilano	Presenter of the Regional Mexican Song

Note: The remaining awards were announced at the Lo Nuestro Awards website.

=== Musical performers ===
The telecast included eighteen musical performances. In order to celebrate the twenty-fifth anniversary of the Lo Nuestro Awards, Dominican singer-songwriter Juan Luis Guerra presented a medley of songs performed by him on previous ceremonies. Colombian artist Carlos Vives debuted his single "Volví a Nacer", ten years after his last appearance in the show. Vives also closed the ceremony. Mexican bands Jesse & Joy, La Arrolladora Banda El Limón de René Camacho and 3Ball MTY (with América Sierra) also performed.

Spanish singer David Bisbal presented a tribute to fellow Spanish singer-songwriter Alejandro Sanz, who performed "Mi Marciana" and "Corazón Partío". Mexican singer Thalía presented a duet with American artist Prince Royce, while Puerto-Rican American artists Ricky Martin and Draco Rosa reunited for the first time to perform the song "Más y Más". Presentations by Chino & Nacho, Elvis Crespo (with Fito Blanko), Pedro Fernández, Gerardo Ortíz, Pitbull, Romeo Santos, and Olga Tañón, were also part of the program.

Mexican-American performer Lupillo Rivera held a tribute to late singer Jenni Rivera and was joined onstage by several singers, including Shaila Dúrcal, María José, Diana Reyes and Olga Tañón. At the time of the tribute the audience was able to participate through their Facebook and Twitter accounts creating a "virtual applause".

Performers (in order of appearance)

Name(s)	Role	Performed
Intro	Music	"Premio Lo Nuestro 25 Años Anniversario" 01:22
Juan Luis Guerra	Performer	"Medley" 05:21
Jesse & Joy	Performers	"Llorar"
Thalía; Prince Royce	Performers	"Te Perdiste Mi Amor"
Carlos Vives	Performer	"Volví a Nacer"
David Bisbal	Performer	"Y, ¿Si Fuera Ella?"
3Ball MTY; América Sierra	Performers	"Porque El Amor Manda"
Pitbull	Performer	"Echa Pa'lla (Manos Pa'rriba)"
Pedro Fernández	Performer	"Medley" 08:34
Draco Rosa; Ricky Martin	Performers	"Más y Más"
La Arrolladora Banda El Limón de René Camacho	Performers	"Llamada De Mi Ex"
Romeo Santos	Performer	"Llévame Contigo"
Gerardo Ortíz	Performer	"Dámaso"
Olga Tañón	Performer	"Todo Lo Que Sube, Baja"
Chino & Nacho	Performers	"Medley"
Alejandro Sanz	Performer	"Mi Marciana"/"Corazón Partío"
Elvis Crespo; Fito Blanko	Performers	"Pegaíto, Suavecito"
Olga Tañón; Lupillo Rivera; Shaila Dúrcal; Diana Reyes; María José	Performers	Jenni Rivera's Tribute 11:02
Carlos Vives	Performer	"Carito"/"Fruta Fresca"/"Como Le Gusta a Tu Cuerpo"

=== Ratings and reception ===
The American telecast on Univision drew in an average 6.4 million people during its three hours of length. Univision was the second in the ratings in the 18-34 demographic, over ABC, CBS and NBC. An estimated 11.6 million total viewers watched all or part of the awards. The 2013 ceremony had the highest audience since 2009 and garnered more Latin viewers than the Academy Awards, American Music Awards, Billboard Music Awards, and Primetime Emmy Awards of 2012, combined. Regarding the social media interaction, Univision and the Lo Nuestro Awards were the number-one social network and program; the show was the most socially active program in the network's history, with a social increase of 320% from 2012. According to Sara Bidel of TV by the Numbers, the broadcast was the second most engaging entertainment show of any language or network, over the Golden Globe Awards and People's Choice Awards. Agustín Barreto and Carlos Marmo were awarded in the television field of the "22nd Annual Latin Music Awards" hosted by the American Society of Composers, Authors and Publishers for the "Main Theme and Incidental Music" of the 2013 Lo Nuestro Awards.

== See also ==
- 2012 in Latin music
- Latin Grammy Awards of 2012
- Latin Grammy Awards of 2013
