= Premio Lo Nuestro 2014 =

Latin Music awards show

26th Lo Nuestro Awards
- Date: February 20, 2014
- Site: American Airlines Arena, Miami, Florida, USA
- Hosted by: Ninel Conde, William Levy
- Produced by: Antonio Guzmán
- Directed by: Johnny Vassallo

Highlights
- Most awards: Marc Anthony (5)
- Most nominations: Marc Anthony, Prince Royce, Alejandro Sanz and Carlos Vives (5)

Television coverage
- Network: Univision
- Duration: 3 hours
- Ratings: 9.5 million (Nielsen ratings)

The 26th Lo Nuestro Awards were presented by the American network Univision, honoring the best Latin music of 2013 in the United States. The ceremony took place on February 20, 2014, at the American Airlines Arena in Miami, Florida beginning at 5:00 p.m. PST (8:00 p.m. EST). The Lo Nuestro Awards were presented in 33 categories and it was televised by Univision. Mexican singer Ninel Conde and Cuban American actor William Levy hosted the show.

American singer Prince Royce earned three awards including Artist of the Year; American artist Marc Anthony received five accolades. Multiple winners also included deceased Mexican-American performer Jenni Rivera, Puerto-Rican American singers Tito El Bambino and Olga Tañón, Mexican-American norteño artist Gerardo Ortíz, and American rapper Pitbull. Puerto-Rican American artist Luis Fonsi and American singer Jencarlos Canela premiered their new singles, and the closing of the show featured the supergroup Salsa Giants. Most performers expressed solidarity with the Venezuelan protests during their participation on the show. The telecast garnered in average 9.5 million viewers in North America.

== Winners and nominees ==
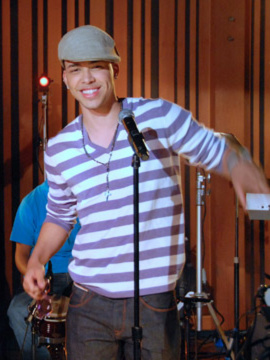
American singer Prince Royce (pictured in 2012), received the Artist of the Year award.

The nominees for the 26th Lo Nuestro Awards were announced on December 3, 2013, on the morning show ¡Despierta América! by several artists including Elvis Crespo, Chino & Nacho, Mané de la Parra, Alejandra Espinoza, Leslie Grace, Rigú, and Tommy Torres. Spanish singer-songwriter Alejandro Sanz, artists Marc Anthony and Prince Royce, and Colombian performer Carlos Vives received the most number of nominations, with five each. The winners were announced before the live audience during the ceremony, with American singer Jenni Rivera being one of the most awarded performers, earning three accolades, including Pop Song ("Detrás de Mi Ventana"), Pop and Regional Mexican Female Artist.

Anthony became the night's biggest winner, receiving four accolades (Tropical Album, Tropical Song, Salsa Artist and Collaboration of the Year for the song "¿Por Qué Les Mientes?" with Tito El Bambino). Anthony also was the recipient of the Excellence Award. American singer Prince Royce was named Artist of the Year and was nominated for the same award at the 2014 Latin Billboard Music Awards. Habítame Siempre by Mexican performer Thalía was the Pop Album of the Year. Upon release, the album reached number-one on the Billboard Top Latin Albums chart. American rapper Pitbull won for Urban Artist and his song "Echa Pa'lla (Manos Pa'rriba)" was the Urban Song of the Year. The song also won the Latin Grammy Award for Best Urban Performance. Mexican rock singer Alejandra Guzmán received the Lifetime Achievement Award; fellow Mexican band 3Ball MTY earned the first Tribal Artist prize, which was criticized by Antonio Tinoco, of the website Latin Times, as the category seemed "to have been made exclusively" to recognize the band. Puerto-Rican American performer Daddy Yankee was named "Youth Idol", which was also scrutinized by Tinoco, since "Daddy has not been relevant in music for quite a while," and accused Univision for awarding him in order to secure his performance on the show.

Winners are listed first, highlighted in boldface and indicated with a double-dagger (‡).

**Artist of the Year**: **Prince Royce**‡; Calibre 50; Don Omar; Maná; Alejandro Sanz	**Collaboration of the Year**: **Tito El Bambino featuring Marc Anthony** – **"¿Por Qué Les Mientes?"**‡; Calibre 50 featuring Banda Carnaval – "Gente Batallosa"; Elvis Crespo featuring Fito Blanko – "Pegaíto Suavecito"; Carlos Vives featuring Michel Teló – "Como Le Gusta a Tu Cuerpo"; Wisin & Yandel featuring Chris Brown and T-Pain – "Algo Me Gusta de Ti"
**Pop Album**: **Thalía – Habítame Siempre**‡; Frankie J – Faith, Hope y Amor; Tommy Torres – 12 Historias; Rigú – Entre Venas; América Sierra – El Amor Manda	**Pop Song**: **Jenni Rivera – "Detrás de Mi Ventana"**‡; Jesse & Joy featuring Mario Domm – "Llorar"; Alejandro Sanz – "Mi Marciana"; Alejandro Sanz – "No Me Compares"; Thalía featuring Prince Royce – "Te Perdiste Mi Amor"
**Pop Male Artist**: **Marco Antonio Solís**‡; Ricardo Arjona; Frankie J; Rigú; Alejandro Sanz	**Pop Female Artist**: **Jenni Rivera**‡; Paulina Rubio; América Sierra; Thalía; Yuridia
**Pop Duo or Group**: **Jesse & Joy**‡; Da'Zoo; Maná; Marconi; Reik	**Pop New Artist**: **América Sierra**‡; Marconi; Rigú; Viajero
**Regional Mexican Album**: **Intocable – En Peligro de Extinción**‡; Julión Álvarez – Tu Amigo Nada Más; Banda Sinaloense MS de Sergio Lizárraga – Mi Razón de Ser; Noel Torres – La Estructura; Voz de Mando – Y Ahora Resulta	**Regional Mexican Song**: **Gerardo Ortíz – "Sólo Vine a Despedirme"**‡; Banda el Recodo – "La Mejor de Todas"; Pesado – "Mi Promesa"; Noel Torres – "Adivina"; Voz de Mando – "Y Ahora Resulta"
**Regional Mexican Male Artist**: **Gerardo Ortíz**‡; Julión Álvarez; Chuy Lizárraga; Roberto Tapia; Noel Torres	**Regional Mexican Female Artist**: **Jenni Rivera**‡; Ana Bárbara; Nena Guzmán; Luz María; Ely Quintero
**Regional Mexican Group**: **Banda el Recodo**‡; La Arrolladora Banda El Limón de René Camacho; Calibre 50; La Original Banda El Limón de Salvador Lizárraga; Voz de Mando	**Norteño Artist**: **Gerardo Ortíz**‡; Calibre 50; Noel Torres; Voz de Mando
**Duranguense Artist**: **Grupo Montez de Durango**‡; Alerta Zero; Conjunto Atardecer; El Trono de México	**Grupero Artist**: **Los Temerarios**‡; Los Ángeles Azules; La Nobleza de Aguililla; Los Primos MX
**Ranchero Artist**: **Vicente Fernández**‡; Pepe Aguilar; Joan Sebastian; Pedro Fernández	**Banda Artist**: **Roberto Tapia**‡; La Arrolladora Banda El Limón de René Camacho; Banda el Recodo; La Original Banda El Limón de Salvador Lizárraga
**Tribal Artist**: **3BallMTY**‡; Danny Guillén; El Pelón del Mikrophone; N-Tribal	**Regional Mexican New Artist**: **El Dasa**‡; Banda La Trakalosa; Código FN; Roberto Junior y su Bandeño
**Tropical Album**: **Marc Anthony – 3.0**‡; Leslie Grace – Leslie Grace; Toby Love – Amor Total; Víctor Manuelle – Me Llamaré Tuyo; Carlos Vives – Corazón Profundo	**Tropical Song**: **Marc Anthony – "Vivir Mi Vida"**‡; Prince Royce – "Te Me Vas"; Romeo Santos – "Llévame Contigo"; Tito El Bambino featuring Marc Anthony – "¿Por Qué Les Mientes?"; Carlos Vives – "Volví a Nacer"
**Tropical Male Artist**: **Prince Royce**‡; Elvis Crespo; Romeo Santos; Víctor Manuelle; Carlos Vives	**Tropical Female Artist**: **Olga Tañón**‡; Ambar; Fanny Lu; Gretchen; Leslie Grace
**Merengue Artist**: **Olga Tañón**‡; Elvis Crespo; Juan Luis Juancho; Kalimete	**Salsa Artist**: **Marc Anthony**‡; Juan Esteban; N'Klabe; Víctor Manuelle
**Tropical Duo or Group**: **Chino & Nacho**‡; Grupo Treo; Ilegales; N'Klabe; Salsa Giants	**Traditional Performance**: **Prince Royce**‡; Chino & Nacho; Romeo Santos; Carlos Vives
**Tropical New Artist**: **Álex Matos**‡; Benavides; Juan Esteban	**Urban Artist of the Year**: **Pitbull**‡; J Alvarez; Daddy Yankee; Don Omar; Tito El Bambino; Wisin & Yandel
**Urban Album of the Year**: **Tito El Bambino – Invicto**‡; J King & Maximan – Los Sucesores; J Alvarez – Imperio Nazza: J Álvarez Edition; Dyland & Lenny – My World 2	**Urban Song of the Year**: **Pitbull – "Echa Pa'lla (Manos Pa'rriba)"**‡; J Alvarez – "La Pregunta"; Daddy Yankee – "Limbo"; Don Omar – "Zumba"; Wisin & Yandel featuring Chris Brown and T-Pain – "Algo Me Gusta de Ti"
**Video of the Year**: **Romeo Santos – "Propuesta Indecente"**‡; J Balvin – "Tranquila"; Jencarlos Canela – "I Love It"; Alejandro Fernández featuring Christina Aguilera – "Hoy Tengo Ganas de Ti"; Jesse & Joy – "Me Quiero Enamorar"; Ricky Martin – "Come with Me"; Alejandro Sanz – "Mi Marciana"; La Santa Cecilia – "Ice El Hielo"; Sie7e – "So What"; Yandel – "Hablé de Ti"

== Presenters and performers ==
The following individuals and groups, listed in order of appearance, presented awards or performed musical numbers.

=== Presenters ===
Presenter(s)	Category
Ana Brenda Contreras	Presenter of the award for Music Video
Elizabeth Álvarez; Benny Ibarra	Presenter of the award for Regional Mexican Song
Diego Luna	Presenter of the performance by Enrique Iglesias and Marco Antonio Solís
Ninel Conde; William Levy	Presenters of the performance by Banda el Recodo
Marjorie de Sousa	Presenter of the award for Tropical Song
Ninel Conde	Presenter of the performance by Jencarlos Canela
Ariadne Díaz; El Dasa	Presenters of the award for Pop Male Artist
Fanny Lu; Yandel	Presenters of the award for Tribal Artist
Altaír Jarabo; Austin Mahone	Presenters of the awards for Urban Artist and Urban Song of the Year
Jorge Salinas; Chiquis Rivera	Presenters of the award for Regional Mexican Duo or Group
Diego Luna	Presenter of the performance by Marco Antonio Solís
Pedro Fernández; Chiquis Rivera	Presenters of the award for Tropical Artist Duo or Group
Zuleyka Rivera; Diogo Morgado	Presenters of the award for Pop New Artist
Pitbull	Presenter of the Excellence Award
Chino & Nacho; La Santa Cecilia	Presenters of the award for Regional Mexican Female Artist
Bárbara Bermudo	Presenter of the award for Artist of the Year

Note: The remaining awards were announced at the Lo Nuestro Awards website.

=== Musical performers ===
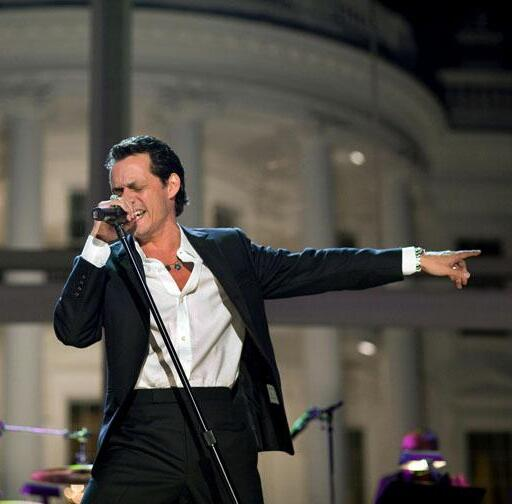
American singer Marc Anthony (pictured in 2009), received the Excellence Award and performed at the show.

The telecast included seventeen musical performances. American singer Víctor Manuelle opened the show with "Mi Salsa Alegra la Fiesta". Mexican actor Diego Luna presented his film Cesar Chavez and the performance by Spanish singer-songwriter Enrique Iglesias, who featured two guests, Mexican artist Marco Antonio Solís (on his single "El Perdedor"), and Pitbull, on their collaborative song "I'm a Freak". Puerto-Rican American singer Jencarlos Canela premiered his new single "Irreparable".

Mexican-American performer Pepe Aguilar performed a medley of "Cuánto Te Debo"/"Acá Entre Nos". Daddy Yankee appeared twice on stage, the first time on his own with "La Nueva y la Ex", and as a guest performer with fellow rapper Yandel on the song "Moviendo Caderas". Mexican rock singer Alejandra Guzmán was celebrating her twenty-fifth anniversary of her musical career and performed "Mi Peor Error". Puerto-Rican artist Luis Fonsi debuted his single "Corazón en La Maleta", two years after his last appearance on the show. Rapper J Balvin, bachata performer Romeo Santos, Mexican singer-songwriter Gloria Trevi and band Voz de Mando also performed.

Puerto-Rican American singer Marc Anthony sung "Cambio de Piel" and "Vivir Mi Vida". The final performers were the supergroup Salsa Giants, formed by producer Sergio George with singers Charlie Zaa, Cheo Feliciano, Ismael Miranda, José Alberto "El Canario", Nora, Oscar D'León, Tito Nieves, and Willy Chirino.

Most performers expressed solidarity with the Venezuelan protests during their participation on the show, including Anthony, Iglesias, and Solís. The Venezuelan duo Chino & Nacho said "it's time we raised our voice for a country that has lost respect for life, a country where ideological fanaticism has divided the people"; while Anthony declared "you are not alone." Jencarlos Canela during his performance shouted: "Venezuela fight for your peace and freedom, we all are with you." Solís and Daddy Yankee dedicated their awards to the country. The hosts, Ninel Conde and William Levy asked the audience to pray for Venezuela.

Name(s)	Performed
Víctor Manuelle	"Mi Salsa Alegra la Fiesta"
Enrique Iglesias; Marco Antonio Solís; Pitbull	"El Perdedor"/"I'm a Freak"
Jencarlos Canela	"Irreparable"
Pepe Aguilar	"Cuánto Te Debo"/"Acá Entre Nos"
Daddy Yankee	"La Nueva y la Ex"
Alejandra Guzmán	"Mi Peor Error"
J Balvin	"Tranquila"
Marco Antonio Solís	"De Mil Amores"
Yandel; Daddy Yankee	"Moviendo Caderas"
Voz de Mando	"Ahora Resulta"
Romeo Santos	"Propuesta Indecente"
Marc Anthony	"Cambio de Piel"/"Vivir Mi Vida"
Prince Royce	"Te Robaré"
Gloria Trevi	"No Querías Lastimarme"
Gerardo Ortíz	"Mujer de Piedra"
Luis Fonsi	"Corazón en La Maleta"
Salsa Giants; Oscar D'León; Nora; José Alberto "El Canario"; Willy Chirino; Cheo Feliciano; Ismael Miranda; Tito Nieves; Charlie Zaa	Medley

== Ceremony information ==
=== Categories and voting process ===
The categories considered were for the Pop, Tropical, Regional Mexican, Tribal, and Urban genres, with additional awards for the General Field that includes nominees from all genres, for the Artist of the Year, Collaboration and Music Video categories. The nominees were selected through an online voting poll at the official website; the winners were chosen from a total of 130 nominations in 33 different categories. The ceremony was produced by Antonio Guzmán, while Mexican singer Ninel Conde and Cuban American actor William Levy hosted the show.

=== Ratings and reception ===
The American telecast on Univision drew in an average 9.5 million people during its three hours of length. Univision was the second in the ratings at the 18–34 and 18–49 demographics, over ABC, CBS and Fox. The 2014 ceremony garnered more Latin viewers than the American Music Awards, Billboard Music Awards, and Primetime Emmy Awards of 2013, combined. Regarding the social media interaction, Univision and the Lo Nuestro Awards were the number-one social network and program; the show was the most socially active program in the network history, and the most active of 2014 to that date. The broadcast was the second most engaging entertainment show regardless of language or network, over the Critic's Choice Movie Awards, Golden Globe Awards, People's Choice Awards and Screen Actors Guild Awards.

== See also ==
- 2013 in Latin music
- Latin Grammy Awards of 2013
- Latin Grammy Awards of 2014
