= Lo Nuestro Award for Duranguense Artist of the Year =

Latin music award

- Country: United States
- Presented by: Univision
- First award: 2007
- Final award: 2014

Highlights
- Most awards: Grupo Montez de Durango (4)
- Most nominations: Grupo Montez de Durango (8)
- Website: univision.com/premiolonuestro

The Lo Nuestro Award for Duranguense Artist of the Year was an award presented annually by American network Univision. The accolade was established to recognize the most talented performers of Latin music. The nominees and winners were originally selected by a voting poll conducted among program directors of Spanish-language radio stations in the United States and also based on chart performance on Billboard Latin music charts, with the results tabulated and certified by the accounting firm Deloitte. However, since 2004, the winners are selected through an online survey. The trophy awarded is shaped in the form of a treble clef.

The award was first presented to American band Grupo Montez de Durango in 2007, they are the most nominated and awarded performers, with four wins out of eight nominations. Mexican band El Trono de México are the most nominated act without a win, with five unsuccessful nominations. In 2014, the category was disestablished.

== Winners and nominees ==
Listed below are the winners of the award for each year, as well as the other nominees.

Key	Meaning
‡	Indicates the winning performer(s)

Year	Performer(s)	Ref
2007 (19th)	Grupo Montez de Durango‡	
2007 (19th)	Alacranes Musical	
2007 (19th)	K-Paz de la Sierra	
2007 (19th)	Patrulla 81	
2008 (20th)	Los Horóscopos de Durango‡	
2008 (20th)	Alacranes Musical	
2008 (20th)	Los Creadorez del Pasito Duranguense de Alfredo Ramírez	
2008 (20th)	Grupo Montez de Durango	
2009 (21st)	Alacranes Musical‡	
2009 (21st)	Los Creadorez del Pasito Duranguense de Alfredo Ramírez	
2009 (21st)	Grupo Montez de Durango	
2009 (21st)	K-Paz de la Sierra	
2009 (21st)	Patrulla 81	
2010 (22nd)	Alacranes Musical‡	
2010 (22nd)	El Trono de México	
2010 (22nd)	Grupo Montez de Durango	
2010 (22nd)	K-Paz de la Sierra	
2010 (22nd)	Patrulla 81	
2011 (23rd)	Grupo Montez de Durango‡	
2011 (23rd)	Conjunto Atardecer	
2011 (23rd)	El Trono de México	
2011 (23rd)	La Apuesta	
2012 (24th)	K-Paz de la Sierra‡	
2012 (24th)	Conjunto Atardecer	
2012 (24th)	Grupo Montez de Durango	
2012 (24th)	El Trono de México	
2013 (25th)	Grupo Montez de Durango‡	
2013 (25th)	La Apuesta	
2013 (25th)	Conjunto Atardecer	
2013 (25th)	El Trono de México	
2014 (26th)	Grupo Montez de Durango‡	
2014 (26th)	Alerta Zero	
2014 (26th)	Conjunto Atardecer	
2014 (26th)	El Trono de México	
