= Lo Nuestro Award for Urban Artist of the Year =

Latin music award

- Current: Lo Nuestro Awards of 2017
- Country: United States
- Presented by: Univision
- First award: 2005
- Currently held by: Maluma (2017)

Highlights
- Most awards: Wisin & Yandel (5)
- Most nominations: Don Omar (11)
- Website: univision.com/premiolonuestro

The Lo Nuestro Award for Urban Artist of the Year is an honor presented annually by American television network Univision at the Lo Nuestro Awards. The accolade was established to recognize the most talented performers of Latin music. The nominees and winners were originally selected by a voting poll conducted among program directors of Spanish-language radio stations in the United States and also based on chart performance on Billboard Latin music charts, with the results tabulated and certified by the accounting firm Deloitte. However, since 2004, the winners are selected through an online survey. The trophy awarded is shaped in the form of a treble clef.

The award was first presented in 2005 to Puerto-Rican American performer Don Omar. The same year, Don Omar was nominated for a Latin Grammy Award for Best Urban Music Album for his album The Last Don Live. Puerto-Rican American reggaeton duo Wisin & Yandel are the most nominated act, with nine nominations, and also are the most awarded, with five wins. The duo also earned the Lo Nuestro Award for Artist of the Year in the 2011 ceremony. American rapper Pitbull won Urban Artist of the Year in 2011, the same year the single "Give Me Everything" became his first to top the Billboard Hot 100 in the United States. Pitbull also won the following year and performed the main theme for the film Men in Black 3 (2012). In 2014, Pitbull was awarded again in the category. Puerto-Rican American performer Tito El Bambino is the most nominated artist without a win, with three unsuccessful nominations.

== Winners and nominees ==
Listed below are the winners of the award for each year, as well as the other nominees.

| Key | Meaning |
|---|---|
| ‡ | Indicates the winning performer(s) |

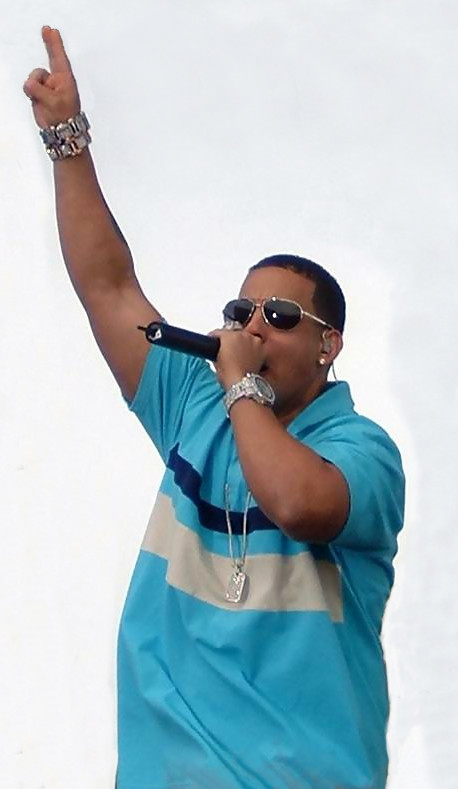
Puerto-Rican American performer Daddy Yankee (pictured in 2013), winner in 2006

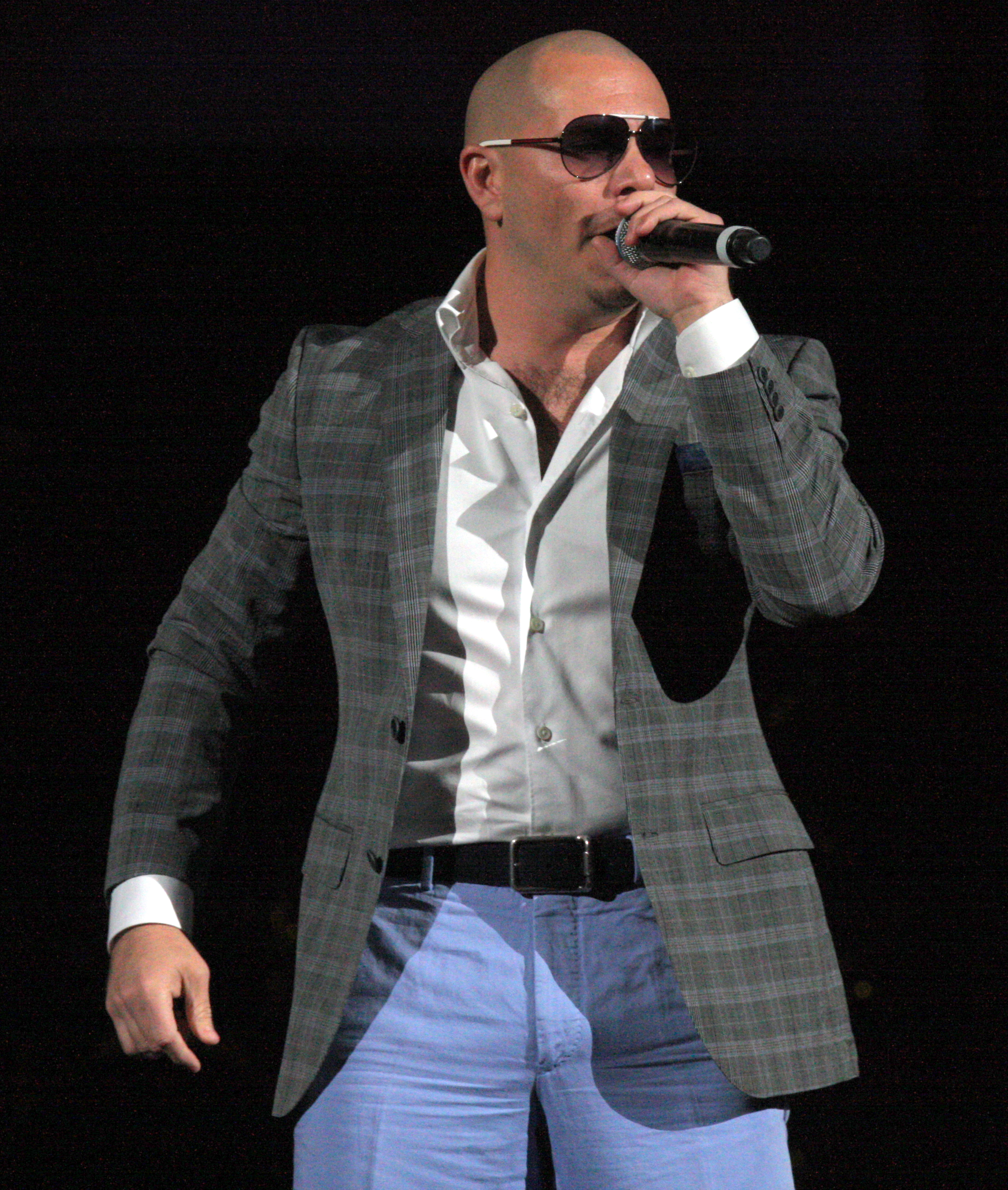
American artist Pitbull (pictured in 2011), three-time winner (2011, 2012 and 2014)

| Year | Performer(s) | Ref |
|---|---|---|
| 2005 (17th) | Don Omar‡ | |
| 2005 (17th) | Control Machete | |
| 2005 (17th) | Fulanito | |
| 2005 (17th) | Yolanda Pérez | |
| 2006 (18th) | Daddy Yankee‡ | |
| 2006 (18th) | Don Omar | |
| 2006 (18th) | Master Joe & O.G. Black | |
| 2006 (18th) | Wisin & Yandel | |
| 2007 (19th) | Wisin & Yandel‡ | |
| 2007 (19th) | Daddy Yankee | |
| 2007 (19th) | Don Omar | |
| 2007 (19th) | Tito El Bambino | |
| 2008 (20th) | Wisin & Yandel‡ | |
| 2008 (20th) | Don Omar | |
| 2008 (20th) | Héctor "El Father" | |
| 2008 (20th) | R.K.M & Ken-Y | |
| 2009 (21st) | Wisin & Yandel‡ | |
| 2009 (21st) | Alexis & Fido | |
| 2009 (21st) | Daddy Yankee | |
| 2009 (21st) | Don Omar | |
| 2009 (21st) | Flex | |
| 2010 (22nd) | Wisin & Yandel‡ | |
| 2010 (22nd) | Daddy Yankee | |
| 2010 (22nd) | Flex | |
| 2010 (22nd) | R.K.M & Ken-Y | |
| 2010 (22nd) | Tito El Bambino | |
| 2011 (23rd) | Pitbull‡ | |
| 2011 (23rd) | Daddy Yankee | |
| 2011 (23rd) | Tony Dize | |
| 2011 (23rd) | Don Omar | |
| 2011 (23rd) | Wisin & Yandel | |
| 2012 (24th) | Pitbull‡ | |
| 2012 (24th) | Daddy Yankee | |
| 2012 (24th) | Don Omar | |
| 2012 (24th) | Wisin & Yandel | |
| 2013 (25th) | Wisin & Yandel‡ | |
| 2013 (25th) | Daddy Yankee | |
| 2013 (25th) | Don Omar | |
| 2013 (25th) | Juan Magán | |
| 2014 (26th) | Pitbull‡ | |
| 2014 (26th) | J Alvarez | |
| 2014 (26th) | Daddy Yankee | |
| 2014 (26th) | Don Omar | |
| 2014 (26th) | Tito El Bambino | |
| 2014 (26th) | Wisin & Yandel | |
| 2015 (27th) | J Balvin | |
| 2015 (27th) | Daddy Yankee | |
| 2015 (27th) | Don Omar | |
| 2015 (27th) | Wisin | |
| 2015 (27th) | Yandel | |
| 2016 (28th) | Nicky Jam‡ | |
| 2016 (28th) | J Balvin | |
| 2016 (28th) | Don Omar | |
| 2016 (28th) | Farruko | |
| 2016 (28th) | Wisin | |
| 2016 (28th) | Yandel | |
| 2017 (29th) | Maluma‡ | |
| 2017 (29th) | J Balvin | |
| 2017 (29th) | Daddy Yankee | |
| 2017 (29th) | Farruko | |
| 2017 (29th) | Nicky Jam | |
| 2017 (29th) | Wisin | |
| 2017 (29th) | Yandel | |
| 2017 (29th) | Zion & Lennox | |

== See also ==
- Grammy Award for Best Latin Urban Album
- Grammy Award for Best Latin Rock, Urban or Alternative Album
- Latin Grammy Award for Best Urban Music Album
- Los Premios MTV Latinoamérica for Best Urban Artist
