= Lo Nuestro Award for New Artist of the Year =

Latin music award

Lo Nuestro Awards for New Artist of the Year
- Country: United States
- Presented by: Univision
- First award: 2013
- Currently held by: Rosalía (female) and Lunay (male) (2020)
- Website: univision.com/premiolonuestro

The Lo Nuestro Award for New Artist of the Year is an honor presented annually by American network Univision. The Lo Nuestro Awards have been held since 1989 to recognize the most talented performers of Latin music. The nominees and winners were originally selected by a voting poll conducted among program directors of Spanish-language radio stations in the United States and also based on chart performance on Billboard Latin music charts, with the results tabulated and certified by the accounting firm Arthur Andersen. Starting from 2004, the winners are selected by the audience through an online survey. The trophy is shaped in the form of a treble clef.

The award was first presented in every field awarded on the Lo Nuestro Awards: Pop, Tropical, Regional Mexican and, for one time only, Rock/Alternative; however in 2013 the former categories for new artist were merged in a single one for Best New Artist in the General Field. Mexican band 3Ball MTY won the Lo Nuestro after earning the same recognition at the Latin Grammys; their record Inténtalo was the third-best selling Latin album of 2012 in the United States and received the Lo Nuestro for Regional Mexican Album. The following year two awards were created in the Pop and Tropical fields, with Mexican singer América Sierra winning for Pop New Artist, and Alex Matos earning the Tropical New Artist. In 2015, the nominees were included in only one category and featured solo artists, Aneeka and Johhny Sky, and ensembles, Kent y Tony and Proyecto X. Proyecto X received the award. In 2017, no nominees were announced for New Artist of the Year.

== Winners and nominees ==
Listed below are the winners of the award for each year, as well as the other nominees for the majority of the years awarded.

Key	Meaning
‡	Indicates the winning artist

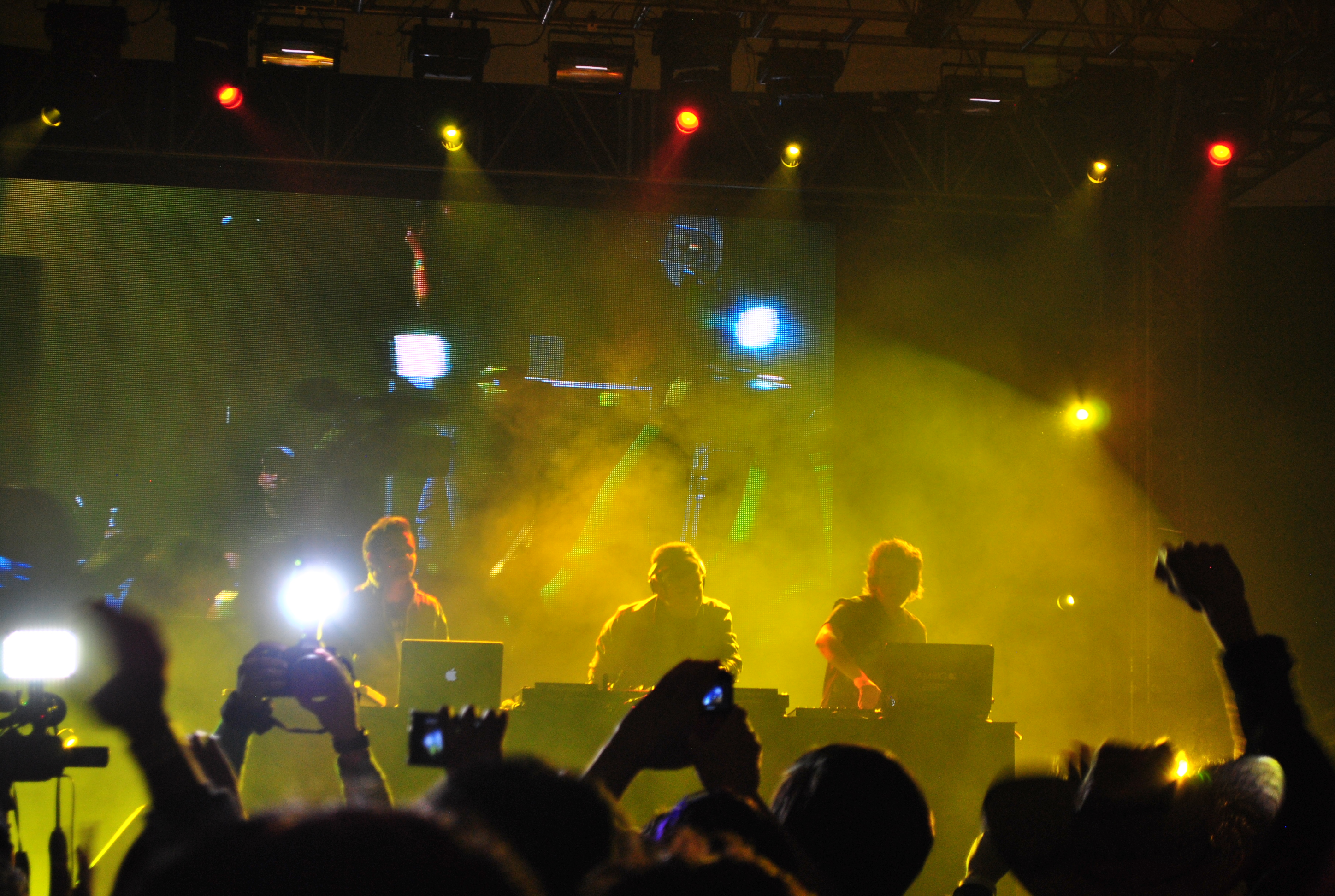
Mexican band 3Ball MTY (pictured in 2013), winner in 2013

Year	Performer(s)	Ref
2013 (25th)	3Ball MTY‡	
2013 (25th)	Kary Hernández	
2013 (25th)	Juan Magan	
2013 (25th)	Henry Santos	
2015 (27th)	Proyecto X‡	
2015 (27th)	Aneeka	
2015 (27th)	Johnny Sky	
2015 (27th)	Kent y Tony	
2016 (28th)	Javier Rosas‡	
2016 (28th)	Sofía Reyes	
2016 (28th)	Rolf Sanchez	
2016 (28th)	Tomas The Latin Boy	
2019 (31st)	Anuel AA	
2019 (31st)	Anitta	
2019 (31st)	Casper Magico	
2019 (31st)	Hansen Flores	
2019 (31st)	Manuel Turizo	
2019 (31st)	Nio García	
2019 (31st)	Raymix	
2019 (31st)	Tini	
2019 (31st)	T3r Elemento	
2019 (31st)	Virlan García	

== See also ==
- Grammy Award for Best New Artist
- Latin Grammy Award for Best New Artist
