= Lo Nuestro Award for Urban Song of the Year =

Latin music award

- Country: United States
- Presented by: Univision
- First award: 2006
- Currently held by: Nicky Jam (2017)

Highlights
- Most awards: Wisin & Yandel (3)
- Most nominations: Daddy Yankee (14)
- Website: univision.com/premiolonuestro

The Lo Nuestro Award for Urban Song of the Year is an honor presented annually by American television network Univision at the Lo Nuestro Awards. The accolade was established to recognize the most talented performers of Latin music. The nominees and winners were originally selected by a voting poll conducted among program directors of Spanish-language radio stations in the United States and also based on chart performance on Billboard Latin music charts. However, since 2004, the winners are selected through an online survey. The trophy awarded is shaped in the form of a treble clef.

The award was first presented to "Lo Que Pasó, Pasó" by Puerto-Rican American performer Daddy Yankee. Yankee also has the record for most nominations for Urban Song of the Year with 14 nominations; Wisin & Yandel are the most awarded artists with three wins. Panamanian rapper Flex's "Te Quiero", won the Lo Nuestro and the Latin Grammy Award for Best Urban Song. "Lovumba" by Daddy Yankee, "Taboo" by Don Omar, "Te Quiero" by Flex, "El Amor" by Tito El Bambino, and "Llamé Pa' Verte" by Wisin & Yandel, won the Lo Nuestro and reached number-one in the Billboard Latin Songs chart. Puerto-Rican American reggaeton duo R.K.M & Ken-Y are the most nominated artists without a win, with three unsuccessful nominations. In 2017, "Hasta el Amanecer" by American singer and rapper Nicky Jam became the most recent award recipient of the award.

== Winners and nominees ==
Listed below are the winners of the award for each year, as well as the other nominees.

Key	Meaning
‡	Indicates the winning song

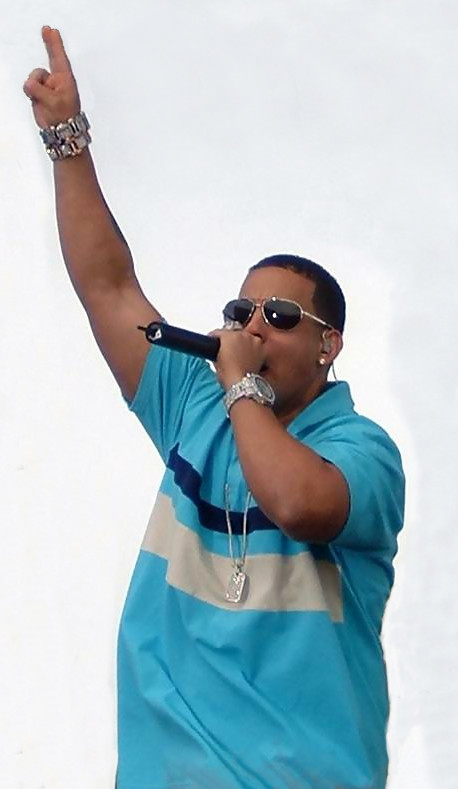
Puerto-Rican American performer Daddy Yankee (pictured in 2006), the first winner and most nominated solo performer, with 13 nominations

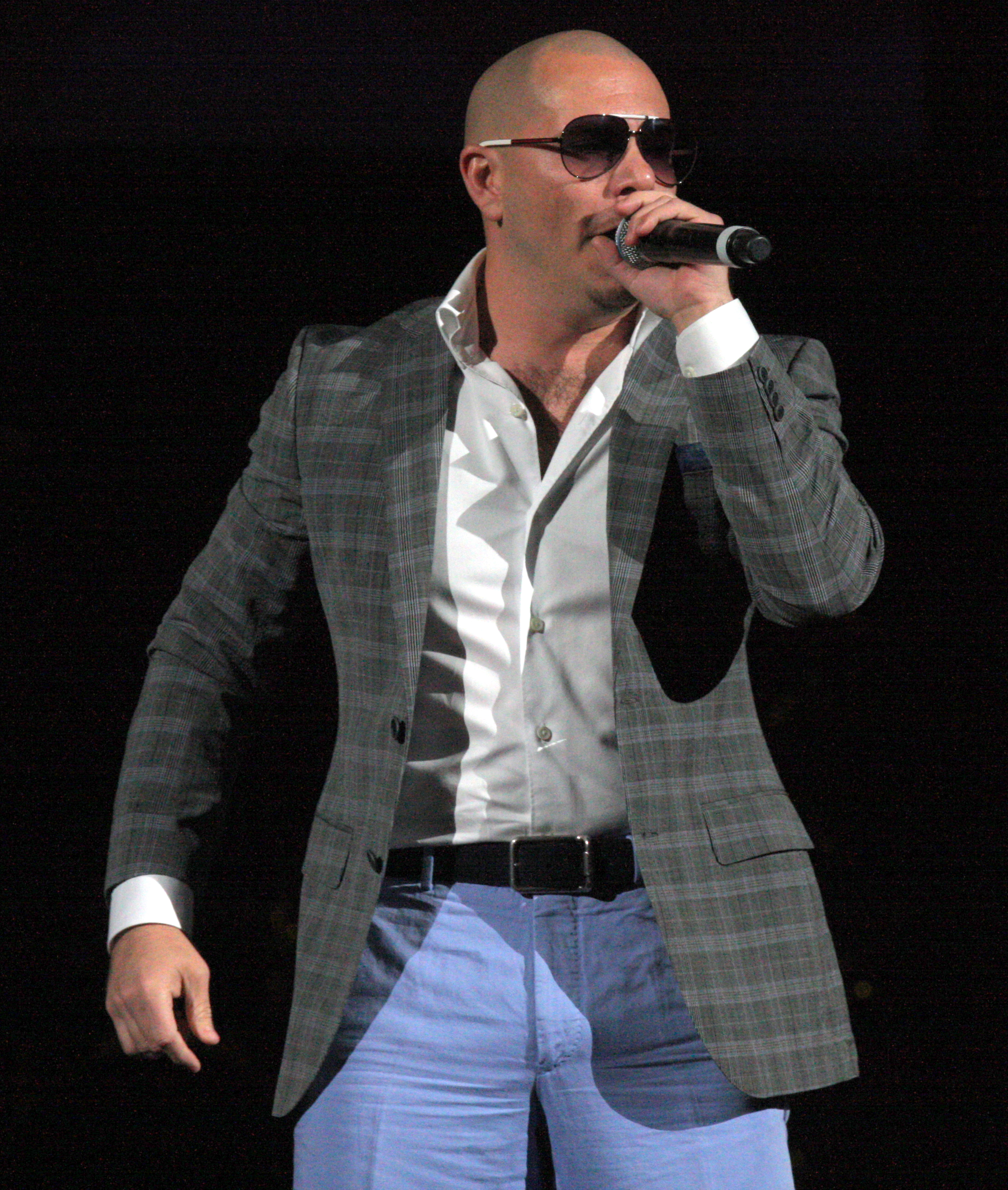
American artist Pitbull (pictured in 2011), winner in 2014

Year	Song	Performer(s)	Ref
2006 (18th)	"Lo Que Pasó, Pasó"‡	Daddy Yankee	
2006 (18th)	"Mayor Que Yo"	Baby Ranks, Daddy Yankee, Héctor "El Father", Tony Tun Tun, and Wisin & Yandel	
2006 (18th)	"Mírame"	Daddy Yankee	
2006 (18th)	"Rakata"	Wisin & Yandel	
2006 (18th)	"Reggaetón Latino"	Don Omar	
2007 (19th)	"Llamé Pa' Verte"‡	Wisin & Yandel	
2007 (19th)	"Caile"	Tito El Bambino	
2007 (19th)	"Down"	R.K.M & Ken-Y	
2007 (19th)	"Machucando"	Daddy Yankee	
2007 (19th)	"Rompe"	Daddy Yankee	
2008 (20th)	"Pegao"‡	Wisin & Yandel	
2008 (20th)	"Igual Que Ayer"	R.K.M & Ken-Y	
2008 (20th)	"Impacto"	Daddy Yankee and Fergie	
2008 (20th)	"Siente El Boom"	Tito El Bambino featuring Randy	
2008 (20th)	"Sola"	Héctor "El Father"	
2009 (21st)	"Te Quiero"‡	Flex	
2009 (21st)	"Ahora Es"	Wisin & Yandel	
2009 (21st)	"He Venido"	MJ	
2009 (21st)	"Sexy Movimiento"	Wisin & Yandel	
2009 (21st)	"Ya No Llores"	Baby Boy	
2010 (22nd)	"El Amor"‡	Tito El Bambino	
2010 (22nd)	"All Up 2 You"	Aventura featuring Akon and Wisin & Yandel	
2010 (22nd)	"Dime Si Te Vas Con Él"	Flex	
2010 (22nd)	"Me Estás Tentando"	Wisin & Yandel	
2010 (22nd)	"¿Qué Tengo Que Hacer?"	Daddy Yankee	
2011 (23rd)	"Te Siento"‡	Wisin & Yandel	
2011 (23rd)	"Ayer la Ví"	Angel & Khriz	
2011 (23rd)	"Descontrol"	Daddy Yankee	
2011 (23rd)	"Hasta Abajo"	Don Omar	
2011 (23rd)	"Quiere Pa' Que Te Quieran"	Dyland & Lenny	
2012 (24th)	"Taboo"‡	Don Omar	
2012 (24th)	"Contéstame El Telefono"	Alexis & Fido featuring Flex	
2012 (24th)	"Mi Corazón Está Muerto"	R.K.M & Ken-Y	
2012 (24th)	"Ven Conmigo"	Daddy Yankee featuring Prince Royce	
2012 (24th)	"Zun Zun Rompiendo Caderas"	Wisin & Yandel	
2013 (25th)	"Lovumba"‡	Daddy Yankee	
2013 (25th)	"Bailando Por El Mundo"	Juan Magán featuring Pitbull and El Cata	
2013 (25th)	"Dutty Love"	Don Omar featuring Natti Natasha	
2013 (25th)	"Hasta Que Salga el Sol"	Don Omar	
2013 (25th)	"Si Te Digo la Verdad"	Gocho	
2014 (26th)	"Echa Pa'lla (Manos Pa'rriba)"‡	Pitbull	
2014 (26th)	"Algo Me Gusta de Ti"	Wisin & Yandel featuring Chris Brown and T-Pain	
2014 (26th)	"La Pregunta"	J Alvarez	
2014 (26th)	"Limbo"	Daddy Yankee	
2014 (26th)	"Zumba"	Don Omar	
2015 (27th)	"6 AM"‡	J Balvin featuring Farruko	
2015 (27th)	"Adrenalina"	Wisin featuring Jennifer Lopez and Ricky Martin	
2015 (27th)	"Hasta Abajo"	Yandel	
2015 (27th)	"La Nueva y la Ex"	Daddy Yankee	
2015 (27th)	"Que Viva la Vida"	Wisin	
2016 (28th)	"El Perdón"‡	Nicky Jam featuring Enrique Iglesias	
2016 (28th)	"Ay Vamos"	J Balvin	
2016 (28th)	"Pierdo la Cabeza"	Zion & Lennox	
2016 (28th)	"Soledad"	Don Omar	
2016 (28th)	"Travesuras"	Nicky Jam	
2017 (29th)	"Hasta el Amanecer"‡	Nicky Jam	
2017 (29th)	"El Perdedor"	Maluma	
2017 (29th)	"Encantadora"	Yandel	
2017 (29th)	"Obsesionado"	Farruko	
2017 (29th)	"Vaivén"	Daddy Yankee	
2019 (31st)	"Sin Pijama"‡	Becky G and Natti Natasha	
2019 (31st)	"El Baño (Remix)"	Enrique Iglesias featuring Bad Bunny and Natti Natasha	
2019 (31st)	"X"	Nicky Jam and J Balvin	
2019 (31st)	"Dura (Remix)"	Daddy Yankee featuring Becky G, Bad Bunny and Natti Natasha	
2019 (31st)	"Única"	Ozuna	
2020 (32nd)	"Con Calma"	Daddy Yankee featuring Snow	
2020 (32nd)	"Baila Baila Baila"	Ozuna	
2020 (32nd)	"No Lo Trates"	Pitbull, Daddy Yankee and Natti Natasha	
2020 (32nd)	"Qué Pretendes"	J Balvin and Bad Bunny	
2020 (32nd)	"Te Robaré"	Nicky Jam and Ozuna	
2021 (32rd)	"La Difícil"	Bad Bunny	
2021 (32rd)	"Fantasía"	Ozuna	
2021 (32rd)	"Hawái"	Maluma	
2021 (32rd)	"Keii"	Anuel AA	
2021 (32rd)	"Morado"	J Balvin	
2021 (32rd)	"Muévelo"	Nicky Jam & Daddy Yankee	
2021 (32rd)	"Que Tire Pa Lante"	Daddy Yankee	
2021 (32rd)	"Sigues Con Él"	Arcángel & Sech	
2021 (32rd)	"Ritmo (Bad Boys For Life)"	Black Eyed Peas & J Balvin	
2021 (32rd)	"Tusa"	Karol G & Nicki Minaj	
2022 (34th)	"Bichota"	Karol G	
2022 (34th)	"Antes"	Anuel AA & Ozuna	
2022 (34th)	"Ayer Me Llamo Mi Ex"(Remix)	Khea, Natti Natasha & Prince Royce Ft. Lenny Santos	
2022 (34th)	"Dákiti"	Bad Bunny & Jhay Cortez	
2022 (34th)	"Fiel"	Los Legendarios, Wisin & Jhay Cortez	
2022 (34th)	"La Nota"	Manuel Turizo, Rauw Alejandro & Myke Towers	
2022 (34th)	"Loco"	Justin Quiles, Chimbala & Zion y Lennox	
2022 (34th)	‘Pepas	Farruko	
2022 (34th)	‘Problema’	Daddy Yankee	
2022 (34th)	‘Tu Veneno’	J Balvin	
2023 (35th)	"Provenza"	Karol G	
2023 (35th)	"Deprimida"	Ozuna	
2023 (35th)	"Desesperados"	Rauw Alejandro & Chencho Corleone	
2023 (35th)	"Dos Tragos"	Jay Wheeler	
2023 (35th)	"Envolver"	Anitta	
2023 (35th)	"Moscow Mule"	Bad Bunny	
2023 (35th)	"Nivel de Perreo"	J Balvin & Ryan Castro	
2023 (35th)	"Ojos Rojos"	Nicky Jam	
2023 (35th)	"Remix"	Daddy Yankee	
2023 (35th)	"Sensual Bebé"	Jhayco	
2024 (36th)	"Classy 101"	Feid & Young Miko	
2024 (36th)	"Besos Moja2"	Wisin & Yandel & Rosalía	
2024 (36th)	"Instagram"	Blessd	
2024 (36th)	"Lala"	Myke Towers	
2024 (36th)	"Más Rica Que Ayer"	Anuel AA, Mambo Kingz & DJ Luian	
2024 (36th)	"Necesidad"	Venesti	
2024 (36th)	"Panties y Brasieres"	Rauw Alejandro & Daddy Yankee	
2024 (36th)	"Un Cigarrillo"	Chencho Corleone	
2024 (36th)	"Where She Goes"	Bad Bunny	
2024 (36th)	"Yandel 150"	Yandel & Feid	
2025 (37th)	"Bellakeo"	Peso Pluma and Anitta	
2025 (37th)	"Baccarat"	Ozuna	
2025 (37th)	"Carbon Vrmor"	Farruko & Sharo Towers	
2025 (37th)	"Chulo PT. 2"	Bad Gyal, Tokischa & Young Miko	
2025 (37th)	"Gata Only"	FloyyMenor & Cris MJ	
2025 (37th)	"La Falda"	Myke Towers	
2025 (37th)	"La Nena"	Lyanno and Rauw Alejandro	
2025 (37th)	"Ohnana"	Kapo	
2025 (37th)	"Sandunga"	Don Omar, Wisin and Yandel	
2025 (37th)	"Un Preview"	Bad Bunny	

== Multiple wins and nominations ==
Number	Performer(s)
Wins
3	Wisin & Yandel
2	Daddy Yankee
2	Nicky Jam
Nominations
14	Daddy Yankee
11	Wisin & Yandel
6	Don Omar
3	Flex
3	Nicky Jam
3	Natti Natasha
3	R.K.M & Ken-Y
3	Tito El Bambino
3	J Balvin
2	Bad Bunny
2	Becky G
2	Héctor El Father
2	Enrique Iglesias
2	Pitbull
2	Yandel
2	Farruko

== See also ==
- Billboard Latin Music Award for Latin Rhythm Airplay Song of the Year
- Latin Grammy Award for Best Urban Song
- Los Premios MTV Latinoamérica for Best Urban Artist
