= Aneeka =

Venezuelan singer born in San Cristóbal

- Born: Andrea Martínez; August 18, 1985 (age 40)
- Origin: San Cristóbal, Venezuela
- Genres: Pop, R&B
- Occupation: Singer
- Website: aneekamusic.com

Aneeka (born Andrea Martínez; August 18, 1985) is a Venezuelan singer born in San Cristóbal. Her name means believe in Wayuu.

== Career ==
Aneeka sought opportunities to record an album in Venezuela but was unsuccessful. She found willing investors in Mexico and after working in different music clubs for seven years, she recorded an album that was never released. She released her first album Ni Antes, Ni Después (Not Before, Nor After), produced by Ettore Grenci, in 2013. It consists of a mix of Pop, R&B and funk music. Ni Antes, Ni Después included ten songs written by Mexican Latin Grammy Award winner Mónica Vélez, whose lyrics deal with topics such as jealousy, infidelity, revenge, sex, and solidarity. The album was pre-produced in Mexico, with melodies by Anneka and her producer Grenci. It was recorded at the Sonic Ranch studio in El Paso, Texas. Reflecting on the album, Aneeka declared: "Today I see my dream crystallized and it was worth the sacrifice of being away from my family and having lived through my teens quickly. This is what I was born to do". Anneka has stated that her musical influences include the American singers Mariah Carey, Whitney Houston and Aretha Franklin. She remarked that she attempted to include their musical styles on the album, blending them with pop music.

Three singles were released from Ni Antes, Ni Después: "Ojo por Ojo"; "Sin Combustible"; and "Demasiado Tarde". The music video for "Ojo Por Ojo" was directed by the photographer and fashion designer Indrani Pal-Chaudhuri. "Sin Combustible" was successful in Mexico as the fourteenth best performing single of 2013, reaching number two in the airplay charts. In the United States, the track peaked at number 24 in the Billboard Tropical Songs chart. Aneeka was nominated for Best New Artist and performed at the Latin Grammy Awards of 2014. She lost to fellow Venezuelan singer Mariana Vega. Aneeka received a nomination for the Lo Nuestro Awards for New Artist of the Year.

In December 2014, it was announced that Aneeka would join the vocal coach Gary Catona's team in the reality show The Ultimate Diva, a singing competition to be broadcast on the video-sharing website YouTube in 2015.

== Discography ==
- Ni Antes... Ni Después (2013)
- Ni Antes... Ni Después "en vivo" (2015)
