= Lo Nuestro Award for Ranchero Artist of the Year =

Latin music award

- Awarded for: Ranchero Artist of the Year
- Country: United States
- Presented by: Univision
- First award: 2001
- Final award: 2014

Highlights
- Most awards: Pepe Aguilar and Vicente Fernández (5)
- Most nominations: Vicente Fernández (12)
- Website: univision.com/premiolonuestro

The Lo Nuestro Award for Ranchero Artist of the Year was an award presented annually by American network Univision. It was first awarded in 2001 and has been given annually since. The accolade was established to recognize the most talented performers of Latin music. The nominees and winners were originally selected by a voting poll conducted among program directors of Spanish-language radio stations in the United States and also based on chart performance on Billboard Latin music charts, with the results being tabulated and certified by the accounting firm Deloitte. At the present time, the winners are selected by the audience through an online survey. The trophy awarded is shaped in the form of a treble clef.

The award was first presented to American singer Pepe Aguilar in 2001. Mexican performer Vicente Fernández and Aguilar both hold the record for the most awards with 5, out of ten nominations and twelve nominations. Mexican singer Alicia Villarreal is the most nominated performer without a win, with three unsuccessful nominations. Mexican-American performer Jenni Rivera is the first and only female artist to have won the award. In 2014, the category was disestablished.

== Winners and nominees ==
Listed below are the winners of the award for each year, as well as the other nominees for the majority of the years awarded.

Key	Meaning
‡	Indicates the winner

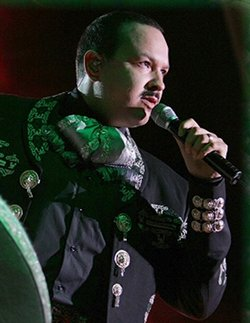
American singer Pepe Aguilar (pictured in 2006), winner in 2001, 2002, 2004, 2005, and 2008

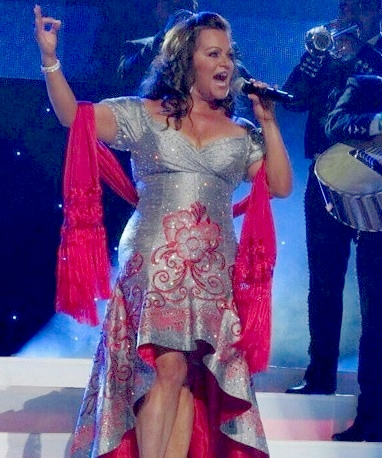
Mexican-American singer Jenni Rivera (pictured in 2012), the only female artist to win the award and win it posthumously

Year	Performer	Ref
2001 (13th)	Pepe Aguilar‡	
2001 (13th)	Pedro Fernández	
2001 (13th)	Vicente Fernández	
2001 (13th)	Yolanda del Río	
2002 (14th)	Pepe Aguilar‡	
2002 (14th)	Vicente Fernández	
2002 (14th)	Julio Preciado	
2002 (14th)	Alicia Villarreal	
2003 (15th)	Vicente Fernández‡	
2003 (15th)	Pablo Montero	
2003 (15th)	Paquita la del Barrio	
2003 (15th)	Pedro Fernández	
2004 (16th)	Pepe Aguilar‡	
2004 (16th)	Vicente Fernández	
2004 (16th)	Marco Antonio Solís	
2005 (17th)	Pepe Aguilar‡	
2005 (17th)	Marco Antonio Solís	
2005 (17th)	Paquita la del Barrio	
2005 (17th)	Vicente Fernández	
2006 (18th)	Vicente Fernández‡	
2006 (18th)	Pepe Aguilar	
2006 (18th)	Ezequiel Peña	
2006 (18th)	Luis Miguel	
2007 (19th)	Vicente Fernández‡	
2007 (19th)	Pepe Aguilar	
2007 (19th)	Pablo Montero	
2007 (19th)	Alicia Villarreal	
2008 (20th)	Pepe Aguilar‡	
2008 (20th)	Vicente Fernández	
2008 (20th)	Pedro Fernández	
2008 (20th)	Alicia Villarreal	
2009 (21st)	Vicente Fernández‡	
2009 (21st)	Pepe Aguilar	
2009 (21st)	Pedro Fernández	
2010 (22nd)	Vicente Fernández‡	
2010 (22nd)	Pepe Aguilar	
2010 (22nd)	Pedro Fernández	
2010 (22nd)	Diego Verdaguer	
2011 (23rd)	Jenni Rivera‡	
2011 (23rd)	Juan Gabriel	
2011 (23rd)	Pedro Fernández	
2011 (23rd)	Alejandro Fernández	
2012 (24th)	Jenni Rivera‡	
2012 (24th)	Joan Sebastian	
2012 (24th)	Pedro Fernández	
2012 (24th)	Vicente Fernández	
2013 (25th)	Pedro Fernández‡	
2013 (25th)	Pepe Aguilar	
2013 (25th)	Shaila Dúrcal	
2013 (25th)	Vicente Fernández	
2014 (26th)	Jenni Rivera‡	
2014 (26th)	Juan Gabriel	
2014 (26th)	Alejandro Fernández	
2014 (26th)	Pedro Fernández	

== See also ==
- Latin Grammy Award for Best Ranchero Album
