= Premio Lo Nuestro 2016 =

28th Lo Nuestro Awards
- Date: February 18, 2016
- Site: American Airlines Arena; Miami, Florida, USA
- Hosted by: Galilea Montijo and Arath de la Torre

Highlights
- Most awards: Nicky Jam, Enrique Iglesias and Ricky Martin (3)
- Most nominations: Romeo Santos (7)

Television coverage
- Network: Univision

The 28th Lo Nuestro Awards ceremony, presented by the American network Univision, honoring the best Latin music of 2015 in the United States, took place on February 18, 2016, at the American Airlines Arena in Miami, Florida beginning at 5:00 p.m. PST (8:00 p.m. EST). During the ceremony, Lo Nuestro Awards were presented in 26 categories. The ceremony was televised in the United States by Univision. Mexican actors Galilea Montijo and Arath de la Torre hosted the show.

American singer-songwriter Nicky Jam, Puerto-Rican American singer Ricky Martin and Spanish artist Enrique Iglesias earned three awards each, including Pop/Rock Album of the Year and Pop Song of the Year for Martin; American reggaeton performer J Balvin received the Artist of the Year accolade. Colombian singer-songwriter Carlos Vives received the Excellence Award and several performers including Balvin, Colombian artists Fonseca, Juanes and Maluma, performed a medley of his greatest hits during the show. Mexican artist Paquita la del Barrio earned the Trajectory Award. The telecast garnered in average 11 million viewers in North America.

== Winners and nominees ==
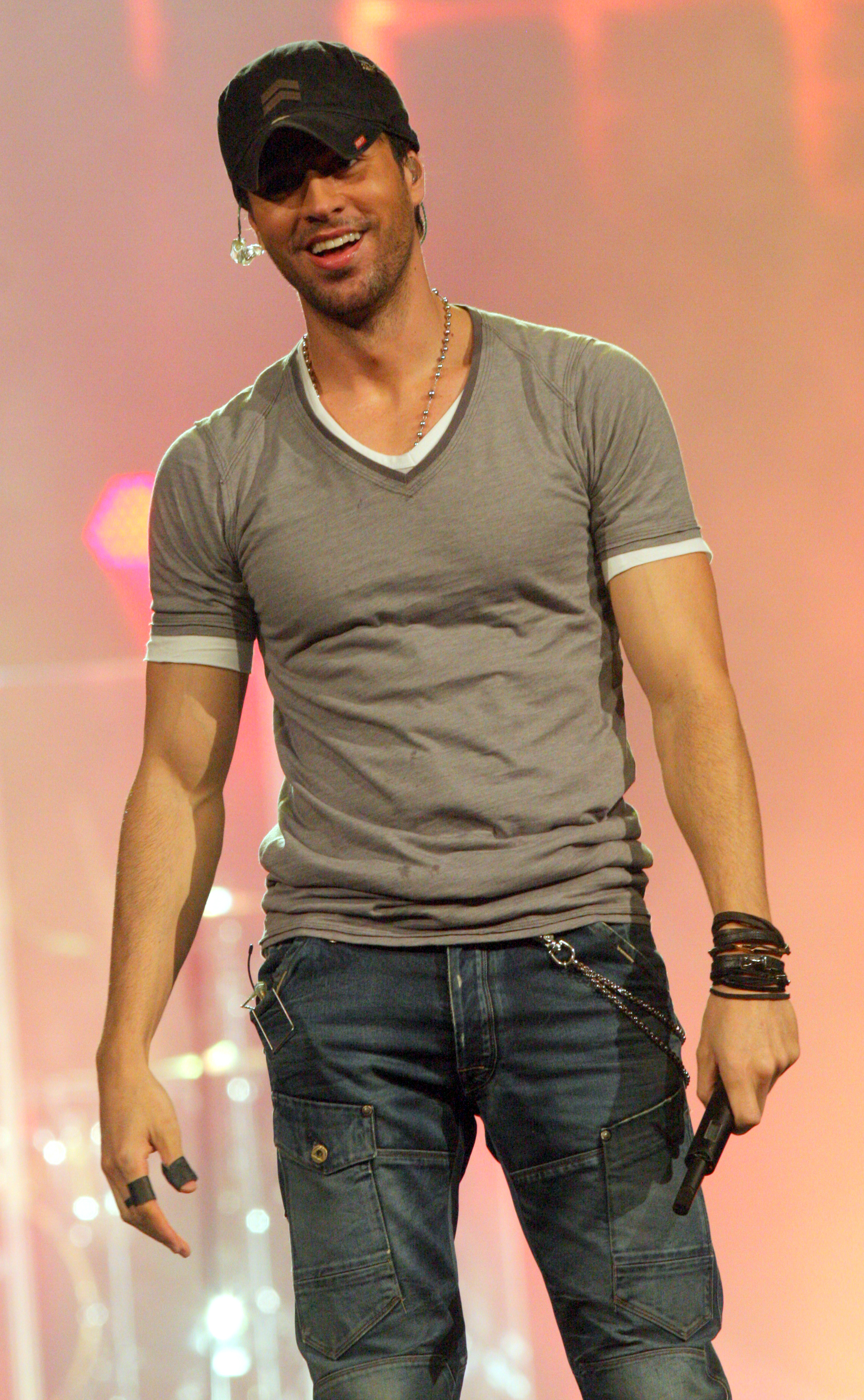
Spanish singer Enrique Iglesias (pictured in 2011), won Pop Male Artist and two additional awards in 2016 for the single "El Perdón".

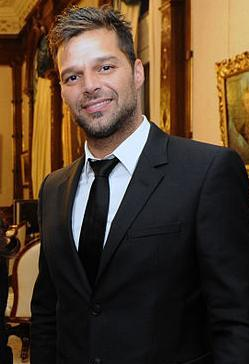
Puerto Rican singer Ricky Martin (pictured in 2011), won three awards, including Video of the Year for "La Mordidita".

The nominees for the 28th Lo Nuestro Awards were announced on December 1, 2015. American singer-songwriter Romeo Santos with seven nominations became the most nominated act, followed by Dominican artist Juan Luis Guerra with six. Puerto Rican singer Ricky Martin earned three awards, including Pop/Rock Album of the Year for his album A Quien Quiera Escuchar which also won the Grammy Award for Best Latin Pop Album; Pop Song of the Year for "Disparo al Corazón", a track nominated for Record of the Year and Song of the Year at the 16th Latin Grammy Awards; and Video of the Year for the single "La Mordidita" featuring Yotuel.

Puerto Rican performer Nicky Jam earned three awards, including two shared with Spanish singer-songwriter Enrique Iglesias, for the single "El Perdón". Jam also received the Lo Nuestro Award for Urban Artist of the Year while Iglesias won for Pop Male Artist. The Artist of the Year was American reggaeton artist J Balvin, and Mexican singer Gerardo Ortiz won the first Album of the Year award for Hoy Más Fuerte. Colombian singer-songwriter received the Excellence Award and Mexican artist Paquita la del Barrio was recognized for her musical career.

Winners are listed first and indicated in bold and with a double-dagger (‡).

**Artist of the Year**: **J Balvin**‡; Calibre 50; Enrique Iglesias; Romeo Santos	**New Artist of the Year**: **Javier Rosas**‡; Sofía Reyes; Rolf Sanchez; Tomas The Latin Boy
**Album of the Year**: **Gerardo Ortíz** – **Hoy Más Fuerte**‡; Juan Gabriel – Los Dúo (Deluxe Edition); Juan Luis Guerra – Todo Tiene Su Hora; Plan B – Love and Sex	**Collaboration of the Year**: **Nicky Jam** and **Enrique Iglesias** – **"El Perdón"**‡; Maná featuring Shakira – "Mi Verdad"; Leandro Ríos featuring Pancho Uresti – "Debajo del Sombrero"; Romeo Santos featuring Marc Anthony – "Yo También"
**Pop/Rock Album**: **Ricky Martin – A Quien Quiera Escuchar**‡; Natalia Jiménez – Creo en Mí; Maná – Cama Incendiada; Thalía – Amore Mío; Alejandro Sanz – Sirope	**Pop Song**: **Ricky Martin – "Disparo al Corazón"**‡; Ricardo Arjona – "Lo Poco Que Tengo"; Luis Fonsi and Juan Luis Guerra – "Llegaste Tú"; Juanes – "Juntos (Together)"; Maná featuring Shakira – "Mi Verdad"
**Pop Male Artist**: **Enrique Iglesias**‡; Ricardo Arjona; Chayanne; Ricky Martin	**Pop Female Artist**: **Natalia Jiménez**‡; Shakira; Thalía; Gloria Trevi
**Pop Duo or Group**: **Jesse & Joy**‡; Camila; Ha*Ash; Maná
**Regional Mexican Album**: **Luis Coronel – Quiero Ser Tu Dueño**‡; Banda Los Recoditos – Sueño XXX; Ariel Camacho y Los Plebes del Rancho – El Karma; Los Tigres del Norte – Realidades; Voz de Mando – Levantando Polvareda	**Regional Mexican Song**: **Julión Álvarez** – "**Y Así Fue**"‡; Banda Los Recoditos – "Hasta Que Salga el Sol"; Régulo Caro – "Soltero Disponible"; Gerardo Ortíz – "Eres Una Niña"; Voz de Mando – "Levantando Polvareda"
**Regional Mexican Male Artist**: **Luis Coronel**‡; Julión Álvarez; Ariel Camacho; Gerardo Ortíz	**Regional Mexican Female Artist**: **Chiquis**‡; Graciela Beltrán; Luz María
**Regional Mexican Group**: **Calibre 50**‡; La Arrolladora Banda el Limón de René Camacho; Banda Los Recoditos; Banda Sinaloense MS de Sergio Lizárraga	**Norteño Artist**: **Gerardo Ortíz**‡; Ariel Camacho y Los Plebes del Rancho; Calibre 50; La Maquinaria Norteña
**Banda Artist of the Year**: **Julión Álvarez y Su Norteño Banda**‡; La Arrolladora Banda el Limón de René Camacho; Banda Los Recoditos; Banda Sinaloense MS de Sergio Lizárraga
**Tropical Album**: **Prince Royce** – **Soy el Mismo (Deluxe Edition)**‡; Chino & Nacho – Radio Universo; Juan Luis Guerra – Todo Tiene Su Hora; Karlos Rosé – Géminis; Víctor Manuelle – Que Suenen los Tambores	**Tropical Song**: **Prince Royce** – "**Soy El Mismo**"‡; Juan Luis Guerra – "Tus Besos"; Romeo Santos – "Eres Mía"; Romeo Santos – "Hilito"; Romeo Santos and Marc Anthony – "Yo También"
**Tropical Male Artist**: **Marc Anthony**‡; Juan Luis Guerra; Prince Royce; Romeo Santos; Víctor Manuelle	**Tropical Female Artist**: **Leslie Grace**‡; Fantine; India; Jessy Rose
**Tropical Duo or Group**: **Los Cadillac's**‡; Chino & Nacho; Gente de Zona; Ilegales	**Tropical Artist of the Year**: **Marc Anthony**‡; Chino & Nacho; Juan Luis Guerra; Prince Royce; Romeo Santos; Víctor Manuelle
**Urban Album of the Year**: **J Balvin** – **La Familia B Sides**‡; Don Omar – The Last Don II; Farruko – Farruko Presenta: Los Menores; Nicky Jam – Greatest Hits, Vol. 1; Tito El Bambino – Alta Jerarquía	**Urban Song of the Year**: **Nicky Jam** and **Enrique Iglesias** – "**El Perdón**"‡; J Balvin – "Ay Vamos"; Zion & Lennox – "Pierdo la Cabeza"; Don Omar – "Soledad"; Nicky Jam – "Travesuras"
**Urban Artist of the Year**: **Nicky Jam**‡; J Balvin; Don Omar; Farruko; Wisin; Yandel	**Video of the Year**: **Ricky Martin** featuring **Yotuel** – "**La Mordidita**"‡; Miguel Bosé – "Encanto"; Bomba Estéreo – "Somos Dos"; Gente de Zona featuring Marc Anthony – "La Gozadera"; Maná featuring Shakira – "Mi Verdad"; Alejandro Sanz – "Un Zombie a la Intemperie"; Carlos Vives – "La Tierra del Olvido (live)"

== Presenters and performers ==
The following individuals and groups, listed in order of appearance, presented awards or performed musical numbers.

=== Presenters ===
Presenter(s)	Category
Marlene Favela	Presenter of the award for Tropical Artist
J Balvin; Ariadna Gutiérrez	Presenters of the award for Album of the Year
Ha*Ash	Presenters of the performance by Regional Mexican Artist and Regional Mexican Album of the Year
Jacqueline Bracamontes; Daniel Arenas	Presenters of the award for Tropical Album
Diego Boneta; Sofía Reyes	Presenters of the award for Urban Album
Luis Coronel	Presenter of the award for Pop Duo or Group
Arath de la Torre; Jesús Ochoa	Presenters of the award for Regional Mexican Group
Chiquinquirá Delgado; René Camacho	Presenters of the award for Tropical Male Artist
Danna García; Régulo Caro	Presenters of the award for Tropical Song
Paulina Vega	Presenter of the Excellence Award
Maluma	Presenter of the award for Regional Mexican Female Artist
Gloria Trevi	Presenter of the Trajectory Award
Alejandra Espinoza	Presenter of the award for Artist of the Year

Note: The remaining awards were announced at the Lo Nuestro Awards website.

=== Performers ===
Name(s)	Performed
Farruko; Pitbull; Joe Perry; Robin Thicke	"Hoy Se Bebe"/"El Taxi"
Jesse & Joy	"Ecos de Amor"
Calibre 50	"Préstamela a Mi"
Thalía; Maluma	"Desde Esa Noche"
Yandel	"Encantadora"
Banda Los Recoditos	"Pistearé"
Gente de Zona; Marc Anthony	"Traidora"
Chiquis Rivera	"La Necia"
Prince Royce	"Culpa al Corazón"
Gloria Trevi	"El Amor"
Zion & Lennox; Yandel; Farruko	"Embriágame"/"Pierdo la Cabeza"
Gerardo Ortíz	"Por Qué Terminamos"
J Balvin; Maluma; Juanes; ChocQuibTown; Fonseca; Sylvestre; Celedón	"Carlos Vives medley"
Sin Bandera	"Medley"
Farruko	"Obsesionado"
Luis Coronel	"Nada Más Por Eso"
Wisin; CNCO	"Tan Fácil"
Chino & Nacho	"Andas en Mi Cabeza"

== Ceremony information ==
=== Categories and voting process ===
The categories considered were for the Pop, Tropical, Regional Mexican, and Urban genres, with additional awards for the General Field that includes nominees from all genres, for the Artist of the Year, Album of the Year, New Artist, Collaboration and Music Video categories. The nominees were selected through an online voting poll at the official website from December 1-20, 2015; the winners were chosen from a total 26 different categories. The ceremony was hosted by Mexican actors Galilea Montijo and Arath de la Torre.

=== Ratings and reception ===
The American telecast on Univision drew in an average 11 million people during its three hours of length. Univision was second and third in the ratings during its first two and a half hour, but rose to number one in the last 30 minutes of the broadcast. According to Glenn Santana of the newspaper Primera Hora, the ratings were the lowest since 2011, and in 2016 faced strong competition from other networks such as WAPA-TV and Telemundo with the TV series Fatmagül and Celia, respectively.

== See also ==
- 2015 in Latin music
- Latin Grammy Awards of 2015
