= Lo Nuestro Award for Artist of the Year =

Annual American award for Latin music

- Current: Premio Lo Nuestro 2019
- Awarded for: Artist of the Year
- Country: United States
- Presented by: Univision
- First award: 2010
- Currently held by: J Balvin (2017)
- Website: univision.com/premiolonuestro

The Lo Nuestro Award for Artist of the Year is an honor presented annually by American network Univision. The Lo Nuestro Awards were first awarded since 1989 and was established to recognize the most talented performers of Latin music. The nominees and winners were originally selected by a voting poll conducted among program directors of Spanish-language radio stations in the United States and also based on chart performance on Billboard Latin music charts, with the results being tabulated and certified by the accounting firm Deloitte. At the present time, the winners are selected by the audience through an online survey. The trophy awarded is shaped in the form of a treble clef.

In 2010, the Artist of the Year award was presented for the first time and the nominees included bands Aventura and Maná and performers Flex, Luis Fonsi and Vicente Fernández. Aventura earned the award, and also was the recipient of the first Latin Artist of the Year accolade at the Billboard Latin Music Awards, which combines achievements on both the Top Latin Albums and Hot Latin Songs charts. The following year, reggaeton duo Wisin & Yandel won the category, and also received the Lo Nuestro Award for Urban Album and Song of the Year.

Colombian singer-songwriter Shakira was recognized as Person of the Year by the Latin Academy of Recording Arts & Sciences in November 2011; three months later was awarded the Lo Nuestro Award for Artist of the Year. In 2012, Shakira also received the American Music Award for Favorite Latin Artist. American banda performer Jenni Rivera won the accolade posthumously, and at the 2013 ceremony received a tribute by various artists, including actor Edward James Olmos and singers Thalía, Paulina Rubio, and Gerardo Ortíz, among others. Mexican band Maná is the most nominated act without a win, with four unsuccessful nominations.

== Winners and nominees ==
Listed below are the winners of the award for each year, as well as the other nominees.

Key	Meaning
‡	Indicates the winner

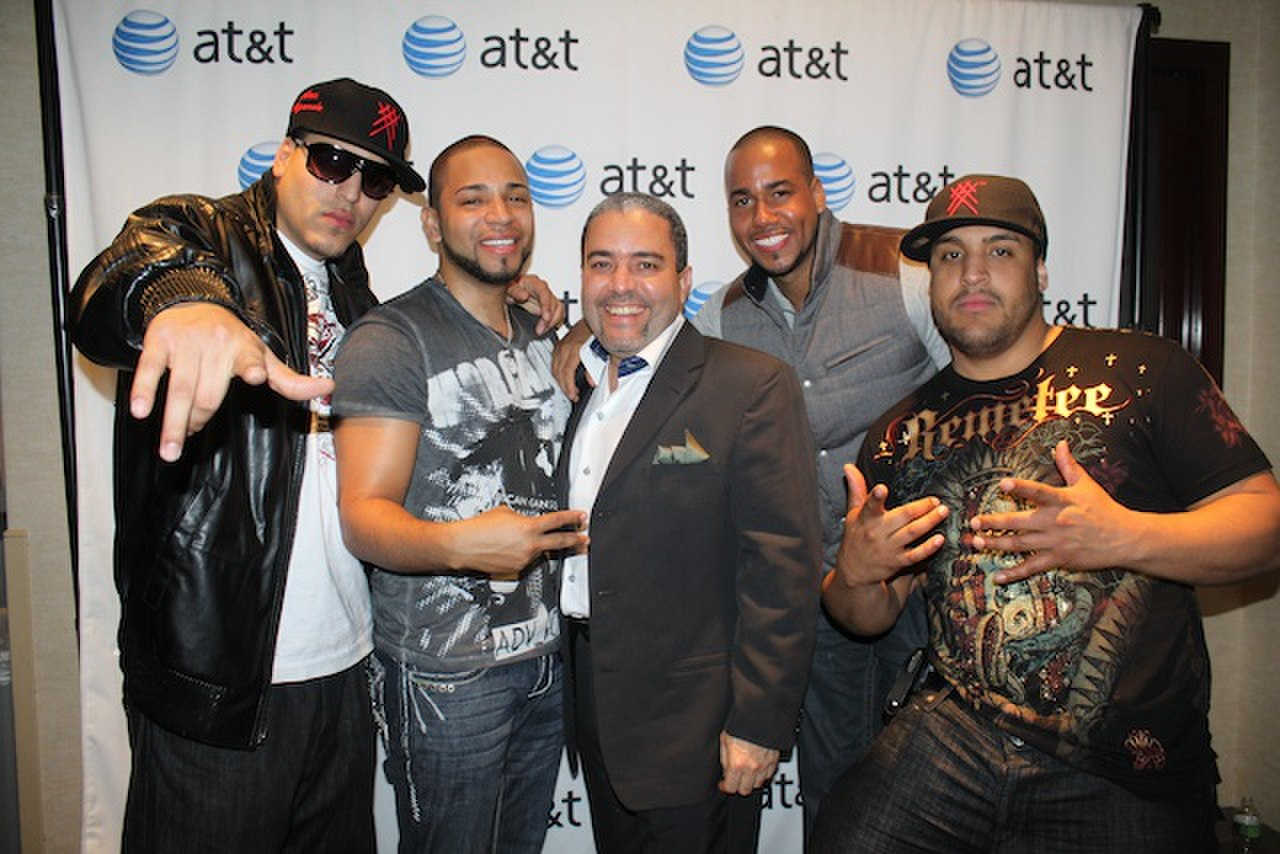
American band Aventura, the inaugural winners of the category

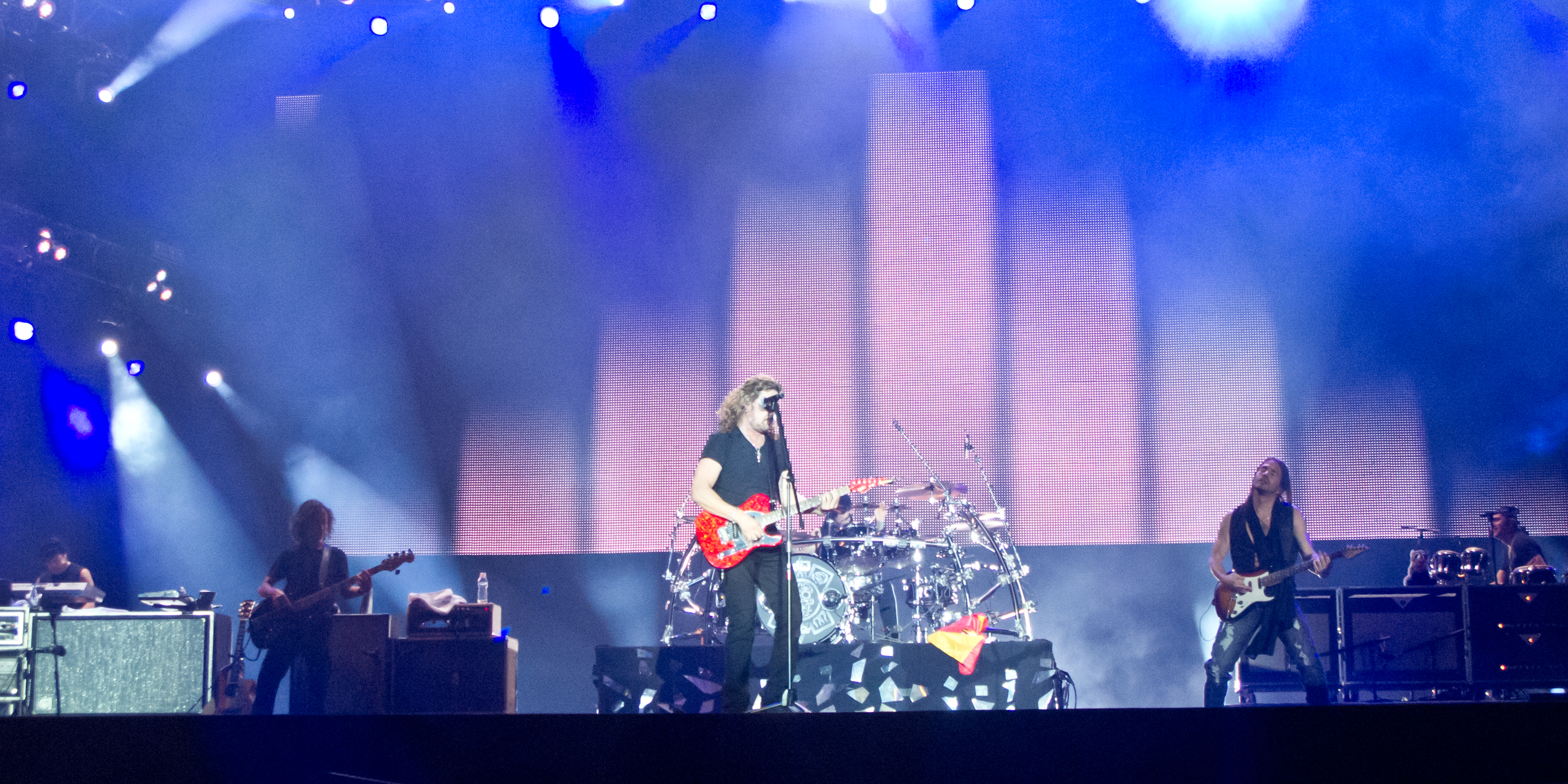
Four-time nominees, Mexican band Maná

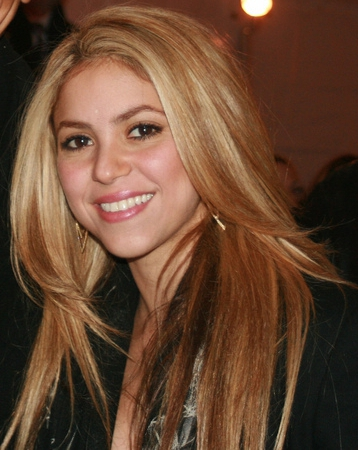
Colombian performer Shakira (pictured in 2009), winner in 2012

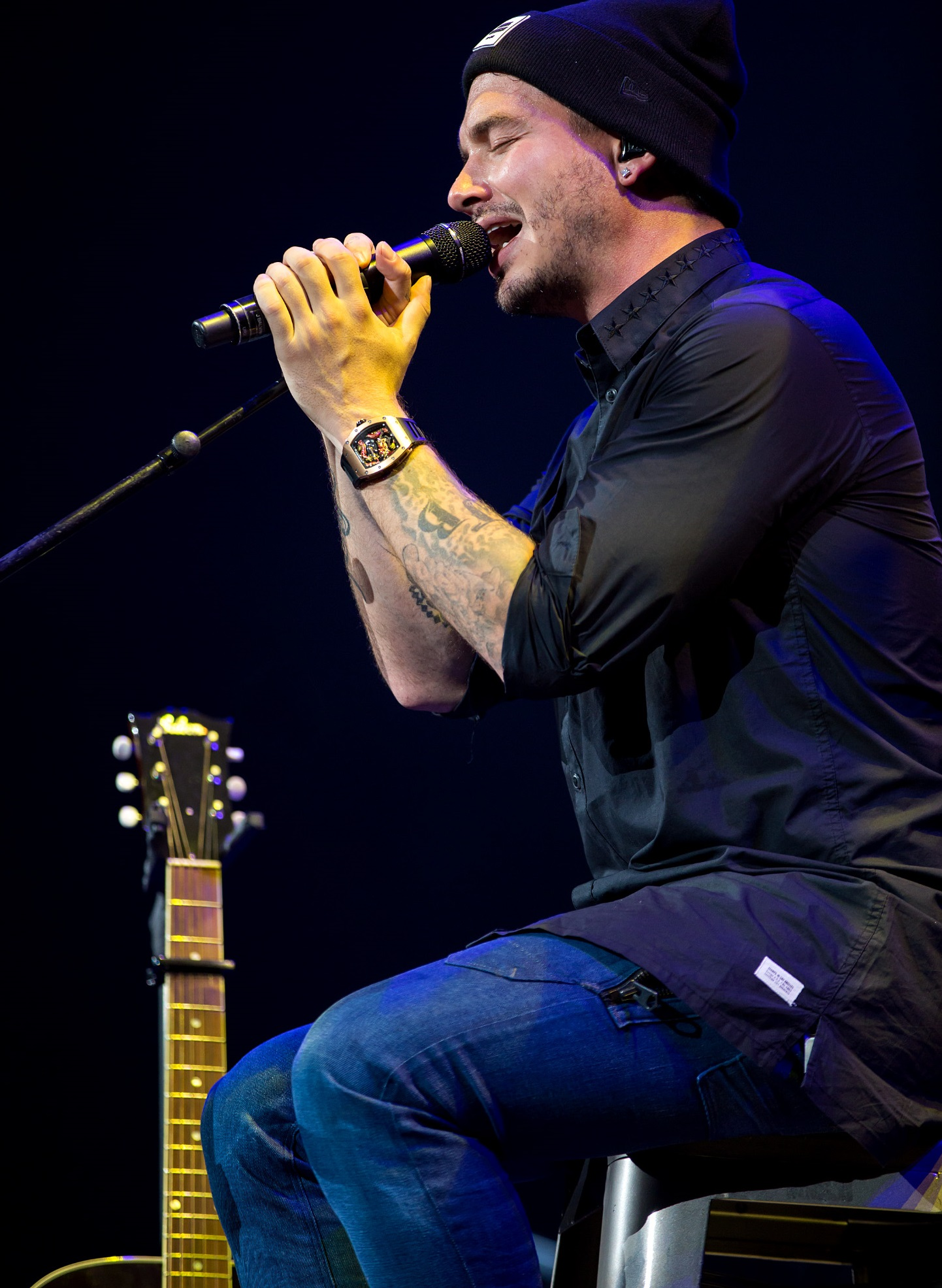
Colombian singer J Balvin winner in 2016 and 2017.

Year	Performer	Ref
2010 (22nd)	Aventura‡	
2010 (22nd)	Flex	
2010 (22nd)	Vicente Fernández	
2010 (22nd)	Luis Fonsi	
2010 (22nd)	Maná	
2011 (23rd)	Wisin & Yandel‡	
2011 (23rd)	Aventura	
2011 (23rd)	Banda el Recodo	
2011 (23rd)	Juanes	
2011 (23rd)	Shakira	
2012 (24th)	Shakira‡	
2012 (24th)	Don Omar	
2012 (24th)	Larry Hernandez	
2012 (24th)	Maná	
2012 (24th)	Tito El Bambino	
2013 (25th)	Jenni Rivera‡	
2013 (25th)	Don Omar	
2013 (25th)	La Arrolladora Banda El Limón de René Camacho	
2013 (25th)	Maná	
2013 (25th)	Romeo Santos	
2014 (26th)	Prince Royce‡	
2014 (26th)	Calibre 50	
2014 (26th)	Don Omar	
2014 (26th)	Maná	
2014 (26th)	Alejandro Sanz	
2015 (27th)	Romeo Santos‡	
2015 (27th)	Calibre 50	
2015 (27th)	J Balvin	
2015 (27th)	Enrique Iglesias	
2016 (28th)	J Balvin‡	
2016 (28th)	Calibre 50	
2016 (28th)	Enrique Iglesias	
2016 (28th)	Romeo Santos	
2017 (29th)	J Balvin‡	
2017 (29th)	Banda Sinaloense MS de Sergio Lizárraga	
2017 (29th)	Enrique Iglesias	
2017 (29th)	Romeo Santos	
2019 (31st)	J Balvin‡	
2019 (31st)	Christian Nodal	
2019 (31st)	Carlos Vives	
2019 (31st)	Maluma	

== See also ==
- Los Premios MTV Latinoamérica for Artist of the Year
