= Premio Lo Nuestro 2015 =

Latin Music awards show

27th Lo Nuestro Awards
- Date: February 19, 2015
- Site: American Airlines Arena; Miami, Florida, USA
- Hosted by: Galilea Montijo and Cristián de la Fuente

Highlights
- Most awards: Enrique Iglesias and Romeo Santos (6)
- Most nominations: Enrique Iglesias (10)

Television coverage
- Network: Univision

The 27th Lo Nuestro Awards ceremony, presented by the American network Univision, honoring the best Latin music of 2014 in the United States, took place on February 19, 2015, at the American Airlines Arena in Miami, Florida beginning at 5:00 p.m. PST (8:00 p.m. EST). During the ceremony, Lo Nuestro Awards were presented in 31 categories. The ceremony was televised in the United States by Univision.

American singer-songwriter Romeo Santos and Spanish artist Enrique Iglesias earned six awards each, including Artist of the Year for Santos and Pop Song of the Year for Iglesias; American norteño singer Gerardo Ortíz and reggaeton performer J Balvin earned three awards. Guatemalan singer-songwriter Ricardo Arjona received the Excellence Award and Italian singer Laura Pausini was recognized for her musical career.

== Winners and nominees ==
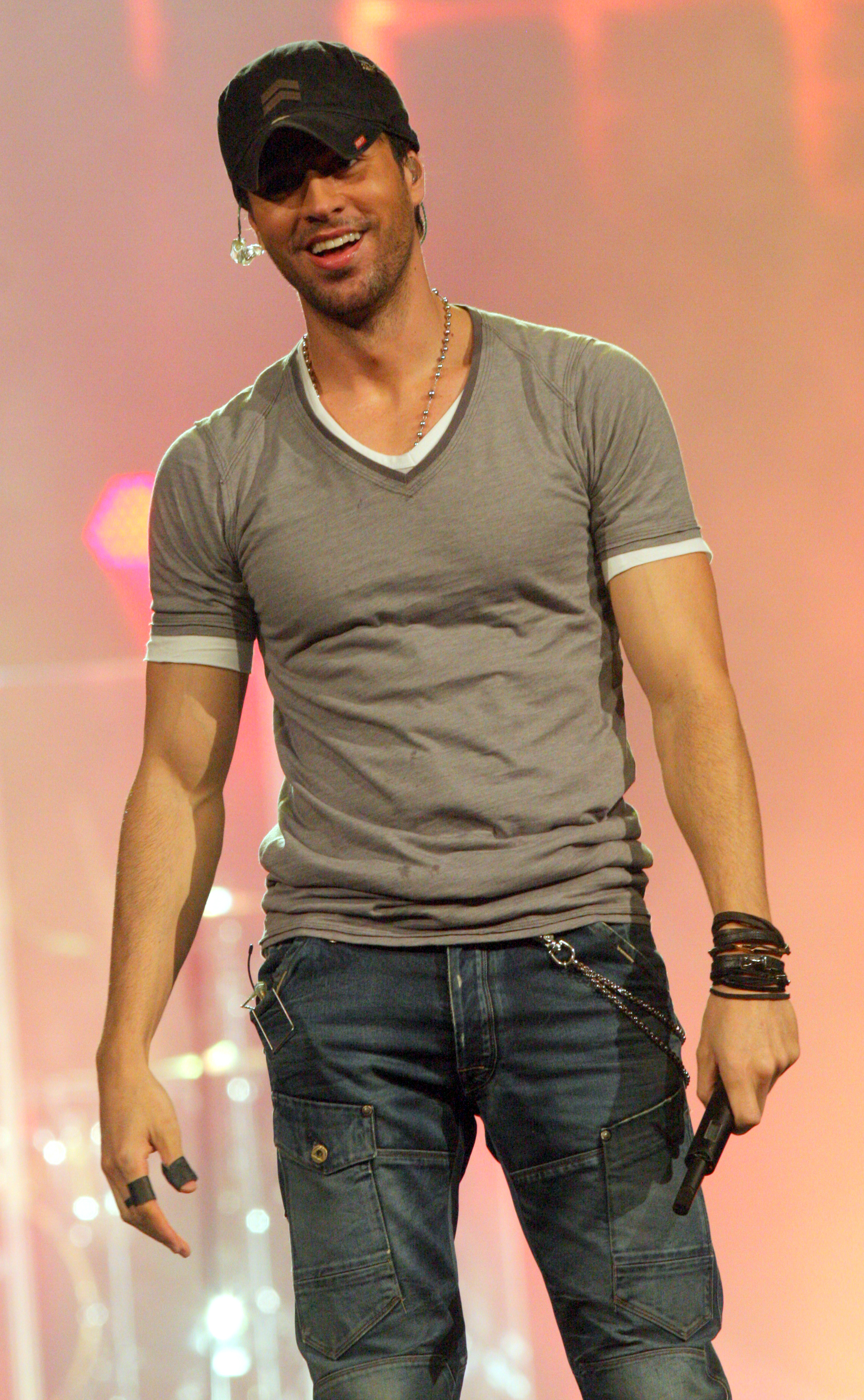
Spanish singer Enrique Iglesias (pictured in 2011), received 10 nominations for the 27th Lo Nuestro Awards including three for Collaboration of the Year for songs performed with Descemer Bueno, Gente de Zona, Marco Antonio Solís and Romeo Santos

The nominees for the 27th Lo Nuestro Awards were announced on December 2, 2014 on the morning show ¡Despierta América! by several artist including Alejandra Guzmán, América Sierra, Chiquis, David Bisbal, Enrique Iglesias, J Balvin, Joey Montana, Laura Pausini, Leslie Grace, Luis Coronel, Noel Torres, and Wisin. Spanish singer-songwriter Enrique Iglesias with ten nominations became the most nominated act. Iglesias' record-breaking song for most weeks at number-one on the Billboard Latin Songs chart, "Bailando", is a finalist for Pop Song and Video of the Year, as well Pop Collaboration of the Year (for the featured performance by Descemer Bueno and Gente de Zona); while his songs "Loco" (with Romeo Santos) and "El Perdedor" (with Marco Antonio Solís), also received nominations. Iglesias is also shortlisted for Artist of the Year along rapper J Balvin, band Calibre 50, and bachata performer Romeo Santos.

American singer Romeo Santos and Spanish artist Enrique Iglesias were the most awarded performers, with six awards each, including a joint win for Tropical Collaboration of the Year for the track "Loco". Santos was named Artist of the Year. For the Regional Mexican Female Artist of the Year, Chiquis earned her first nomination up against her late mother, Jenni Rivera. About the nomination, Chiquis declared to the website Latin Times: "It's a great honor to be nominated for the first time for Premio Lo Nuestro, but it's a great honor that I feel to be nominated with my mom." Jenni Rivera won the award, two years after her death, and her daughter Chiquis received the accolade on her behalf. Guatemalan singer-songwriter Ricardo Arjona received the Excellence Award.

Winners are listed first and indicated with a double-dagger (‡).

Artist of the Year: Romeo Santos‡; Calibre 50; J Balvin; Enrique Iglesias	New Artist of the Year: Proyecto X‡; Aneeka; Johhny Sky; Kent y Tony
Pop Album: Enrique Iglesias – Sex and Love‡; 3Ball MTY – Globall; Juanes – Loco de Amor; Laura Pausini – 20 – Grandes Éxitos; Marco Antonio Solís – Gracias Por Estar Aquí	Pop Song: Enrique Iglesias featuring Descemer Bueno and Gente de Zona – "Bailando"‡; 3Ball MTY featuring América Sierra and Gerardo Ortíz – "La Noche es Tuya"; Camila – "Decidiste Dejarme"; Enrique Iglesias featuring Marco Antonio Solís – "El Perdedor"; Marco Antonio Solís – "Tres Semanas"
Pop Male Artist: Enrique Iglesias‡; Ricardo Arjona; Juanes; Ricky Martin; Marco Antonio Solís	Pop Female Artist: Shakira‡; Becky G; Alejandra Guzmán; Laura Pausini; Gloria Trevi
Pop Duo or Group: Camila‡; 3Ball MTY; Jesse & Joy; La Ley; Río Roma	Pop Collaboration of the Year: Enrique Iglesias featuring Descemer Bueno and Gente de Zona – "Bailando"‡; 3Ball MTY featuring América Sierra and Gerardo Ortíz – "La Noche es Tuya"; Pablo Alborán featuring Jesse & Joy – "Dónde Está el Amor"; Alejandra Guzmán featuring Yandel – "Mi Peor Error"; Enrique Iglesias featuring Marco Antonio Solís – "El Perdedor"
Regional Mexican Album: Gerardo Ortíz – Archivos de Mi Vida‡; Julión Álvarez – Soy Lo Que Quiero... Indispensable; Banda El Recodo de Cruz Lizárraga – Haciendo Historia; El Komander – Cazador; Noel Torres – La Balanza	Regional Mexican Song: Gerardo Ortíz – "Mujer de Piedra"‡; Banda El Recodo de Cruz Lizárraga – "Vas a Llorar por Mi"; Banda Los Recoditos – "Mi Ultimo Deseo"; Banda Sinaloense MS de Sergio Lizárraga – "Hermosa Experiencia"; Voz de Mando – "Muchacho de Campo"
Regional Mexican Male Artist: Luis Coronel‡; Julión Álvarez; El Komander; Gerardo Ortíz; Noel Torres	Regional Mexican Female Artist: Jenni Rivera‡; Chiquis; Ana Bárbara; Luz María; Ely Quintero
Regional Mexican Group: La Arrolladora Banda El Limón de René Camacho‡; Banda Carnaval; Banda Los Recoditos; Banda Sinaloense MS de Sergio Lizárraga; Calibre 50	Norteño Artist: Gerardo Ortíz‡; Calibre 50; Los Huracanes del Norte; Noel Torres
Grupero Artist: Tierra Cali‡; Los Primos MX; La Nobleza de Aguililla; El Trono de México	Banda Artist of the Year: La Arrolladora Banda El Limón de René Camacho‡; Banda Carnaval; Banda Los Recoditos; Banda Sinaloense MS de Sergio Lizárraga
Regional Mexican Collaboration of the Year: Tito Torbellino featuring Espinoza Paz – "Te la Pasas"‡; Los Ángeles Azules featuring Saúl Hernández – "Entrega de Amor"; Colmillo Norteño featuring Banda Tierra Sagrada – "El Bueno y el Malo"; Saúl El Jaguar featuring La Bandononona Clave Nueva De Max Peraza – "Al Estilo Mafia"; La Original Banda El Limón de Salvador Lizárraga featuring Río Roma – "Fin de Semana"
Tropical Album	Tropical Song
Romeo Santos – Formula, Vol. 2‡; Limi-T 21 – Party & Dance; Joey Montana – Único; Prince Royce – Soy el Mismo; Carlos Vives – Más + Corazón Profundo	Romeo Santos – "Propuesta Indecente"‡; Enrique Iglesias featuring Romeo Santos – "Loco"; Prince Royce – "Darte un Beso"; Prince Royce – "Te Robaré"; Romeo Santos featuring Drake – "Odio"
Tropical Male Artist	Tropical Female Artist
Romeo Santos‡; Marc Anthony; Karlos Rosé; Prince Royce; Carlos Vives	Olga Tañón‡; Gretchen; Leslie Grace; Giselle Tavera; Santaye
Merengue Artist	Salsa Artist
Héctor Acosta "El Torito"‡; Elvis Crespo; Grupo Treo; Limi-T 21	Marc Anthony‡; Salsa Giants; Víctor Manuelle; Yanfourd
Tropical Duo or Group	Traditional Performance
Chino & Nacho‡; Los Cadillac's; Grupo Treo; Ilegales; Limi-T 21	Romeo Santos‡; Chino & Nacho; Prince Royce; Carlos Vives
Tropical Collaboration of the Year
Enrique Iglesias featuring Romeo Santos – "Loco"‡; Joey Montana featuring Juan Magan – "Love & Party"; Laura Pausini featuring Marc Anthony – "Se Fué"; Romeo Santos featuring Drake – "Odio"; Carlos Vives featuring Marc Anthony – "Cuando Nos Volvamos a Encontrar"
Urban Album of the Year	Urban Song of the Year
J Balvin – La Familia‡; Alexis & Fido – La Esencia; Daddy Yankee – King Daddy; Yandel – De Líder a Leyenda; Wisin – El Regreso del Sobreviviente	J Balvin featuring Farruko – "6 AM"‡; Daddy Yankee – "La Nueva y la Ex"; Wisin – "Que Viva la Vida"; Wisin featuring Jennifer Lopez and Ricky Martin – "Adrenalina"; Yandel – "Hasta Abajo"
Urban Artist of the Year	Urban Collaboration of the Year
J Balvin‡; Daddy Yankee; Don Omar; Wisin; Yandel	J Balvin featuring Farruko – "6 AM"‡; Farruko featuring Sean Paul – "Passion Whine"; Maluma featuring Eli Palacios – "La Temperatura"; Wisin featuring Jennifer Lopez and Ricky Martin – "Adrenalina"; Yandel featuring Daddy Yankee – "Moviendo Caderas"
Video of the Year
Enrique Iglesias featuring Descemer Bueno and Gente de Zona – "Bailando"‡; Ricardo Arjona – "Apnea"; David Bisbal – "No Amanece"; Chayanne – "Tu Respiración"; Daddy Yankee – "Ora Por Mi"; Alejandro Fernández featuring Vicente Fernández – "Me Olvidé de Vivir"; Juan Luis Guerra – "Tus Besos"; Carlos Vives featuring Marc Anthony – "Cuando Nos Volvamos a Encontrar"; Wisin featuring Jennifer Lopez and Ricky Martin – "Adrenalina"; Zoé – "Arrullo de Estrellas"

== Ceremony information ==
=== Categories and voting process ===
The categories considered were for the Pop, Tropical, Regional Mexican, and Urban genres, with additional awards for the General Field that includes nominees from all the genres, for the Artist of the Year, New Artist and Music Video categories. The nominees were selected based on the Top 500 Latin Songs played during the eligibility period, October 1, 2013 to September 30, 2014, according to Nielsen Broadcast Data Systems. The winner for the 31 categories were selected through an online voting poll at the official website during December, 2014.
