= Gerardo Ortíz =

American singer (born 1989)

Gerardo Ortiz
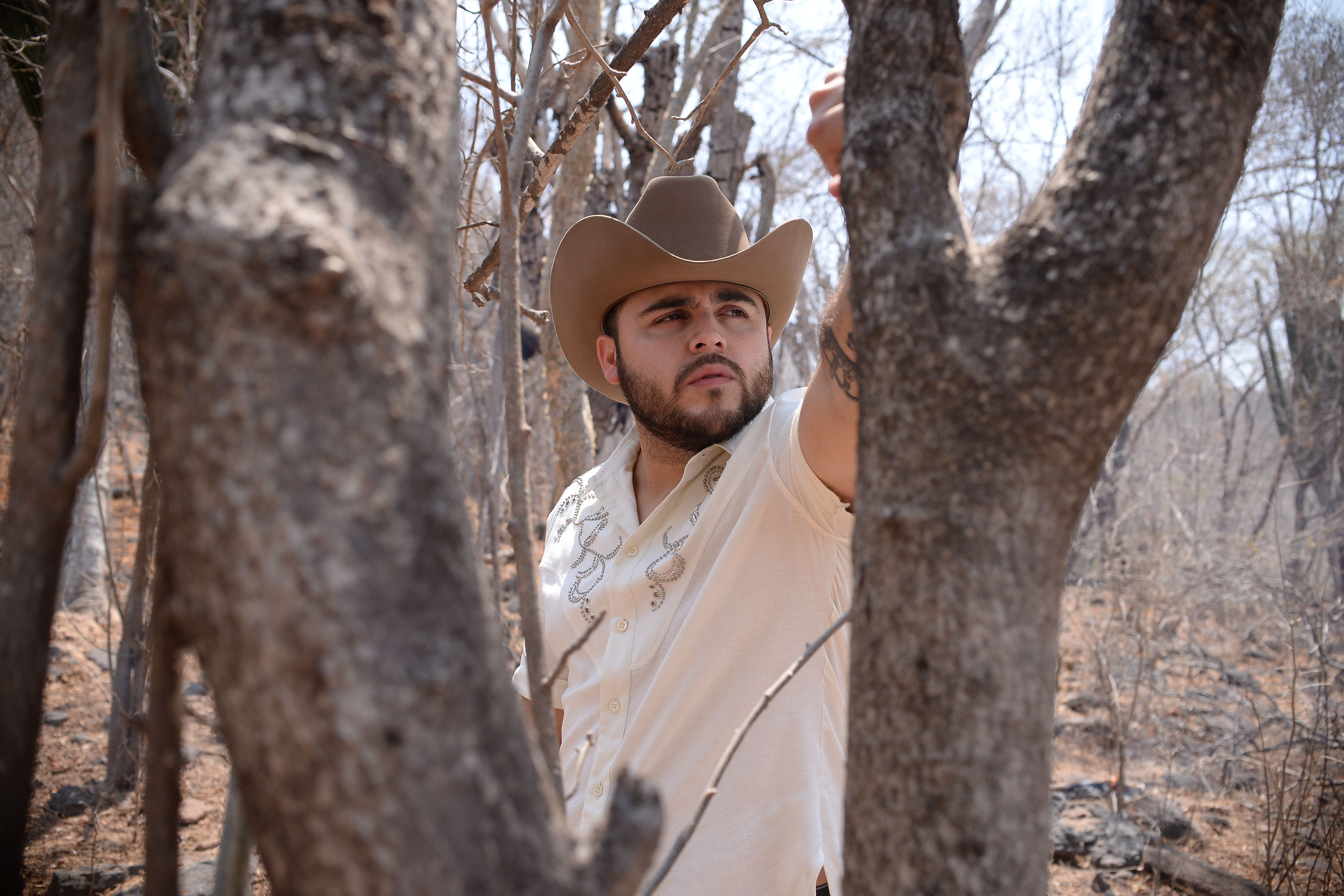
- Ortíz in June 2020
- Born: October 5, 1989 (age 36); Pasadena, California, U.S.
- Height: 5 ft 8 in (173 cm)
- Website: gerardoortiz.net

Gerardo Ortiz (born October 5, 1989) is an American singer in the regional Mexican genre.

== Discography ==
Studio albums

- 2010: Ni Hoy Ni Mañana
- 2011: Entre Dios y El Diablo
- 2012: El Primer Ministro
- 2013: Archivos de Mi Vida
- 2015: Hoy Más Fuerte
- 2017: Comere Callado Vol. 1
- 2018: Comere Callado Vol. 2
- 2020: Más Caro, Que Ayer
- 2021: Décimo Aniversario
- 2023: No Tengo Rival
- 2025: El Ejemplar

Live albums

- 2009: En Vivo Las Tundras
- 2011: Morir y Existir En Vivo
- 2013: Sold Out – En Vivo Desde El Nokia Theatre LA Live

== Awards and nominations ==
Year	Award	Category	Work	Result	Ref.
2011	Grammy Award	Best Norteño Album	Ni Hoy Ni Mañana	Nominated	
2012	Premio Lo Nuestro	Best Collaboration	"Culiacán vs. Mazatlán" (with Calibre 50)	Nominated	
2012	Premio Lo Nuestro	Regional Mexican Male Artist	Gerardo Ortiz	Nominated	
2012	Premio Lo Nuestro	Norteño Artist	Gerardo Ortiz	Nominated	
2013	Grammy Award	Best Regional Mexican Music Album (including Tejano)	El Primer Ministro	Nominated	
2013	Premio Lo Nuestro	Regional Mexican Song	"Amor Confuso"	Won	
2013	Premio Lo Nuestro	Regional Mexican Male Artist	Gerardo Ortiz	Nominated	
2013	Premio Lo Nuestro	Norteño Artist	Gerardo Ortiz	Won	
2014	Premio Lo Nuestro	Regional Mexican Song	"Sólo Vine a Despedirme"	Won	
2014	Premio Lo Nuestro	Regional Mexican Male Artist	Gerardo Ortiz	Won	
2014	Premio Lo Nuestro	Norteño Artist	Gerardo Ortiz	Won	
2015	Premio Lo Nuestro	Pop Song	"La Noche es Tuya" (with 3Ball MTY and América Sierra)	Nominated	
2015	Premio Lo Nuestro	Pop Collaboration	"La Noche es Tuya" (with 3Ball MTY and América Sierra)	Nominated	
2015	Premio Lo Nuestro	Regional Mexican Album	Archivos de Mi Vida	Won	
2015	Premio Lo Nuestro	Regional Mexican Song	"Mujer de Piedra"	Won	
2015	Premio Lo Nuestro	Regional Mexican Male Artist	Gerardo Ortiz	Nominated	
2015	Premio Lo Nuestro	Norteño Artist	Gerardo Ortiz	Won	
2015	Latin American Music Awards	Favorite Regional Mexican Male Artist	Gerardo Ortiz	Nominated	
2015	Latin American Music Awards	Album of the Year	Hoy Más Fuerte	Nominated	
2016	Premio Lo Nuestro	Album of the Year	Hoy Más Fuerte	Won	
2016	Premio Lo Nuestro	Regional Mexican Song	"Eres Una Niña"	Nominated	
2016	Premio Lo Nuestro	Regional Mexican Male Artist	Gerardo Ortiz	Nominated	
2016	Premio Lo Nuestro	Norteño Artist	Gerardo Ortiz	Won	
