= Los Primos de Durango =

Mexican band

- Origin: Vicente Guerrero, Durango
- Genres: Duranguense, grupero, Mexican Pop
- Years active: 2003–present
- Label: Disa Records/Universal Music Group
- Members: Arturo Manuel Vargas Ríos (vocals and sax); Javier Eduardo Vargas Amaya (vocals); Luis Enrique Vargas Ríos (drums and keyboard); Jesús Fernando Vargas Ríos (sax)
- Website: www.losprimosdedurango.com.mx

Los Primos de Durango ( Los Primos Mx ) are a regional Mexican band. They formed in Vicente Guerrero, Durango in 2003.

== Discography ==
- 2004: Grandres Exitos
- 2004: Mas Candela Duranguense
- 2005: Nostalgia Duranguense
- 2005: Tal Vez
- 2007: Voy a Convencerte
- 2008: Duelo de Nuevas Generaciones
- 2008: En Vivo Su Gira Power Duranguense
- 2008: Con Fuego en Tu Piel...100 % Duranguense Light
- 2009: Mi Mejor Regalo una Década Contigo
- 2009: Solo Para Fans
- 2010: Leyenda Duranguense
- 2010: Collecion Privada Las 20 Exclusivas
- 2011: Gruperas Que Hicieron Historia
- 2011: 20 del Recuerdo
- 2011: 20 Temas
- 2012: Gruperas Que Hicieron Historia (Edición Especial)
- 2013: Amor Brutal
- 2014: 30 Grandes Exitos
- 2014: Rescatando el Amor
- 2016: 20 Doradas y Adoradas Originales
- 2016: Y Sigue la Lumbre
- 2019: Lo Más Escuchado de
