= Conjunto Atardecer =

Mexican band

- Origin: Santa María del Oro, Durango, Durango, Mexico
- Genres: Duranguense, Norteño-Sax
- Years active: 2000-2017, 2020-Present
- Label: Universal Music Mexico
- Website: conjuntoatardecer.us

Conjunto Atardecer is a regional Mexican band that specializes in the duranguense genre. The group was formed in September 2000 in Santa Maria del Oro, Durango.

== History ==
Conjunto Atardecer formed in Santa Maria del Oro, Durango, in September 2000. The idea of forming the group stemmed from the concerns of three young students who were beginning to switch on some of the school festivals, which were much in demand, as well as private events.

Seeing that many people liked the band, they were asked increasingly to perform at private events. They then decided to invite two more members, thus reinforcing musically. They began to rehearse, but not yet by the name that would identify them in their presentations. It was then that they had the idea of calling themselves "Conjunto Atardecer"; honoring that afternoon when the five came together for the first time.

From its inception, the group began to grow in popularity, which led them to record their first album entitled "Con Todo el Corazón" ("From the Heart"). It held in Durango, and with very good public acceptance and placing radio hits, they became a favorite of the region.

Some time later, the group launched what was their second production, "Atardecer Canta Corridos" ("Atardecer Sing Corridos"). With that they soon gained popularity in places like Chihuahua, San Luis Potosí and Zacatecas, as well as several cities in Texas, allowing them to make their first appearances on American soil.

The overall success came immediately to Conjunto Atardecer, managing to get the attention of promoters and record companies; eventually getting signed to Universal. They then launched the following material entitled "Mi Eterno Amor Secreto"("My Secret Eternal Love"). That album came to change the direction of the group, as they were now shaping up to be one of the most influential groups from Durango.

Their presence in radio was not limited. Tracks like "Debajo de los Laureles", “Yo Te Enseñé” and “Quiero Pensar en Ti" ("Under the Laurels", "I Taught You" and "I Think of You") were big radio hits on the regional Mexican stations, allowing the band to tour throughout the United States.

From that moment, Conjunto Atardecer began harvesting a number of successes in 2008. By that year, they had recorded 10 albums, in addition to countless nominations and awards that covered Lo Nuestro Awards, a Grammy, Furia Musical, and others.

In mid-2008, the group released their 11th album entitled "Se Va Muriendo Mi Alma"("My Soul is Dying").

In 2012, Conjunto Atardecer released their album "De Mil Maneras...Sin Limites" (A Thousand Ways...No Limits) and their single "Te Veré Como Me Ves" ("I'll See You as How You See Me").

In January 2017, Conjunto Atardecer's lead vocalist, Heraclio Cepeda announced on the group's Facebook page vía live video that the group was breaking up at the end of February of that year. He was to start a Norteño-sax band called “H Norteña” and said that Conjunto Atardecer was splitting on good terms.

In January 2020, Conjunto Atardecer reunited and are recording and touring once again.

== Discography ==
- Puro Durango (2000)
- Canta Corridos (2001)
- Conjunto Atardecer (2003)

== El Pasito de Durango (2003) ==
No.	Title	Length
1.	"Tierra Extraña"
2.	"Corrido De Durango"
3.	"Allá En El Kiosko"
4.	"Camino A Tepehuanes"
5.	"De Esta Sierra A La Otra Sierra"
6.	"500 Novillos"
7.	"Jambalaya"
8.	"La Celda 27"
9.	"Durango, Durango"
10.	"El Pajonal"
11.	"Mis Paisanos y Yo"
12.	"Anoche Soñé Contigo"

- Los Número Uno del Pasito Duranguense (2004)

== Amor Duranguense (2005) ==
No.	Title	Length
1.	"Y Las Mariposas"
2.	"Mi Eterno Amor Secreto"
3.	"Nadie Es Eterno En Este Mundo"
4.	"No Me Sé Rajar"
5.	"Te Vi Con Él"
6.	"Yo Te Enseñé"
7.	"Recuerdame y Ven"
8.	"Mis Paisanos y Yo"
9.	"Suerte He Tenido"
10.	"El Tamarindo"
11.	"Arboles De La Barranca"
12.	"Antes De Que Te Vayas"

- En Vivo (2005)
- Desde la Sierra de Durango (2005)

== Cantan Corridos II (2005) ==
No.	Title	Length
1.	"El Profeta"
2.	"Dario Ibarra"
3.	"El Tarasco"
4.	"El Avión De La Muerte"
5.	"El Centenario"
6.	"Ramiro Sierra"
7.	"Ignacio Remedios"
8.	"Bola De Gatos Rayados"
9.	"Recordando Las Nieves Durango"
10.	"Jesús Rubio"

- El Decimo; Y Siguen... Los Número Uno del Pasito Duranguense (2006)
- Las #1 de los Numero Uno del Pasito Duranguense (2007)

== Se Va Muriendo Mi Alma (2008) ==
No.	Title	Length
1.	"Se Va Muriendo Mi Alma"	3:25
2.	"No Lo Haré"	3:07
3.	"Nave Sin Ruta y Destino"	2:58
4.	"¿Cómo Te Olvido?"	4:02
5.	"Un Osito Dormilón"	3:40
6.	"Dueña De Mi Vida"	2:42
7.	"Mi Buen Corazón"	3:28
8.	"Te Amo"	2:45
9.	"Ya No Volverás"	3:15
10.	"Acepta Mi Error"	2:25
11.	"Se Va Muriendo Mi Alma (Remix)"	4:14

- En Concierto (2008)
- Dedicado a Ti (2009)

== Contigo Para Siempre (2009) ==
No.	Title	Length
1.	"Enamorado Por Primera Vez"
2.	"Encontré"
3.	"No Pude Quitarte Las Espinas"
4.	"El Compa Beto"
5.	"Quién"
6.	"Tu Pasado"
7.	"Si No Es Contigo"
8.	"La Ley De Cupido"
9.	"Sabiendo Quién Era Yo"
10.	"El Celular (El Presumido)"
11.	"Oro"

== Solo Junto A Ti (2010) ==
No.	Title	Length
1.	"La Loquera"
2.	"No Es Lo Mismo"
3.	"Solo Junto A Ti"
4.	"Duele"
5.	"Se Me Olvidó"
6.	"Ya No Me Importas"
7.	"El Reggaeton"
8.	"Igual Que Las Demas"
9.	"Cada Día Más Fuerte"
10.	"El Fantasma"

== Llegamos y Nos Quedamos ==
No.	Title	Writer(s)	Length
1.	"Dile Que Me Amas"	Kike Suárez	3:30
2.	"Amor Sicario"	Heraclio Cepeda, Mario Madrigal, Tury Barraza	2:35
3.	"El Punto Final (feat. Grupo Montez De Durango)"	Heraclio Cepeda, Mario Madrigal, Tury Barraza	3:23
4.	"La Mini Mini"	Gary Cooper	2:40
5.	"De Fiesta"	Heraclio Cepeda, Mario Madrigal, Tury Barraza	2:33
6.	"Discúlpame"	Luciano Luna, Miguel Romero	2:35
7.	"Dedicada A Mi Madre"	Heraclio Cepeda, Mario Madrigal, Tury Barraza	3:00
8.	"Creo Que Algo Me Ocultas"	Horacio Palencia	3:15
9.	"Ya Te Encontré"	Heraclio Cepeda, Mario Madrigal, Jairo Covarrubias	3:18
10.	"Por Si Regresas"	Heraclio Cepeda, Mario Madrigal, Francisco Esteban Romo Martínez	3:38
11.	"Así Es El Amor"	Heraclio Cepeda, Mario Madrigal, Jairo Covarrubias	3:00
12.	"Y Te Amo Tanto (feat. Calibre 50)"	Agusto Guido	3:00

== De Mil Maneras... Sin Límites (2012) ==
No.	Title	Writer(s)	Length
1.	"Miénteme"	Tury Barraza	3:13
2.	"El Viejón"	Tury Barraza	2:42
3.	"La Ambientadita"	Tury Barraza	3:00
4.	"Mi Corazón Se Equivocó"	Tury Barraza, Mario Madrigal	2:42
5.	"Agradezco"	Tury Barraza, Mario Madrigal	3:28
6.	"Te Veré Como Me Ves"	Tury Barraza, Mario Madrigal	3:12
7.	"El Bueno"	Luciano Luna	2:55
8.	"No Me Extrañes"	Kike Suárez	3:30
9.	"Puedes Quedarte"	Heraclio Cepeda, Mario Madrigal, Francisco Esteban Romo Martínez	2:50
10.	"El Quematierra"	Oscar Solis	3:28
11.	"De Mil Maneras"	Moisés Arellanes Fausto	2:50
12.	"Para Mi Madre"	Heraclio Cepeda	3:12
13.	"Acércate (feat. Crudos Tribal)"	Moisés Arellanes Fausto	3:03

- Ahora con Norteño (2013)
- Innovando y Conquistando (2014)
- Sesiones Acústicas (Album En Vivo) (2014)
- Cada Quien (2015)
- Escribiendote Con El (2021)

== Members ==
- Heraclio Cepeda (Vocals and Tambora)
- José Merardo Cepeda (Keyboards)
- Jorge Sánchez (Keyboards)
- Eslie N. López (Bass Drum)
- Eduardo Enríquez (Drums)
- Víctor Navarro (Saxophone)
- Alan Eduardo (Saxophone)

== Past members ==
- Mario Madrigal (Vocals and Keyboards) 2000-2013
- Daniel Rubio (Keyboards)
- Noel Godínez (Keyboards) 2003-2005
- Roberto Villa (Drums) 2004-2009
