= List of number-one Billboard Regional Mexican Songs of 2014 =

The Billboard Regional Mexican Songs chart ranks the best-performing Regional Mexican singles in the United States. Published weekly by Billboard magazine, it ranks the "most popular regional Mexican songs, ranked by radio airplay audience impressions as measured by Nielsen Music."

== Chart history ==
Key
†	Indicates best-performing song of 2014

Issue date	Song	Artist(s)	Ref.
January 4	"Vas a llorar por mí"	Banda El Recodo de Cruz Lizárraga	
January 11	"Vas a llorar por mí"	Banda El Recodo de Cruz Lizárraga	
January 18	"Vas a llorar por mí"	Banda El Recodo de Cruz Lizárraga	
January 25	"Vas a llorar por mí"	Banda El Recodo de Cruz Lizárraga	
February 1	"Vas a llorar por mí"	Banda El Recodo de Cruz Lizárraga	
February 8	"Mujer de piedra"	Gerardo Ortíz	
February 15	"Mujer de piedra"	Gerardo Ortíz	
February 22	"Mujer de piedra"	Gerardo Ortíz	
March 1	"Hermosa experiencia" †	Banda Sinaloense MS de Sergio Lizárraga	
March 8	"Hermosa experiencia" †	Banda Sinaloense MS de Sergio Lizárraga	
March 15	"Hermosa experiencia" †	Banda Sinaloense MS de Sergio Lizárraga	
March 22	"Hermosa experiencia" †	Banda Sinaloense MS de Sergio Lizárraga	
March 29	"Te hubieras ido antes"	Julión Álvarez y su Norteño Banda	
April 5	"Te hubieras ido antes"	Julión Álvarez y su Norteño Banda	
April 12	"Te hubieras ido antes"	Julión Álvarez y su Norteño Banda	
April 19	"Te hubieras ido antes"	Julión Álvarez y su Norteño Banda	
April 26	"Te hubieras ido antes"	Julión Álvarez y su Norteño Banda	
May 3	"Te hubieras ido antes"	Julión Álvarez y su Norteño Banda	
May 10	"Hermosa experiencia" †	Banda Sinaloense MS de Sergio Lizárraga	
May 17	"Hermosa experiencia" †	Banda Sinaloense MS de Sergio Lizárraga	
May 24	"Mi segunda vida"	La Arrolladora Banda el Limón de René Camacho	
May 31	"Cero a la izquierda"	Los Huracanes del Norte	
June 7	"Mi segunda vida"	La Arrolladora Banda el Limón de René Camacho	
June 14	"Quién se anima"	Gerardo Ortiz	
June 21	"Quién se anima"	Gerardo Ortiz	
June 28	"Quién se anima"	Gerardo Ortiz	
July 5	"Quién se anima"	Gerardo Ortiz	
July 12	"Tus latidos"	Calibre 50	
July 19	"Tus latidos"	Calibre 50	
July 26	"Tus latidos"	Calibre 50	
August 2	"Quién se anima"	Gerardo Ortiz	
August 9	"Tus latidos"	Calibre 50	
August 16	"Tus latidos"	Calibre 50	
August 23	"Tenerte"	Luis Coronel	
August 30	"Tenerte"	Luis Coronel	
September 6	"Tenerte"	Luis Coronel	
September 13	"La historia de mis manos"	Banda Carnaval	
September 20	"La historia de mis manos"	Banda Carnaval	
September 27	"La historia de mis manos"	Banda Carnaval	
October 4	"La historia de mis manos"	Banda Carnaval	
October 11	"La historia de mis manos"	Banda Carnaval	
October 18	"No me pidas perdón"	Banda Sinaloense MS de Sergio Lizárraga	
October 25	"No me pidas perdón"	Banda Sinaloense MS de Sergio Lizárraga	
November 1	"Hasta que salga el sol"	Banda Los Recoditos	
November 8	"La bala"	Los Tigres del Norte	
November 15	"Y así fue"	Julión Álvarez y su Norteño Banda	
November 22	"Y así fue"	Julión Álvarez y su Norteño Banda	
November 29	"Y así fue"	Julión Álvarez y su Norteño Banda	
December 6	"Javier el de Los Llanos"	Calibre 50	
December 13	"No me pidas perdón"	Banda Sinaloense MS de Sergio Lizárraga	
December 20	"Y así fue"	Julión Álvarez y su Norteño Banda	
December 27	"Levantando polvadera"	Voz de Mando	
