= Premio Lo Nuestro 2017 =

Latin Music awards show

29th Lo Nuestro Awards
- Date: February 23, 2017
- Site: American Airlines Arena; Miami, Florida, US
- Hosted by: Alejandra Espinoza and William Valdés

Highlights
- Most awards: CNCO, Gente de Zona, Shakira and Carlos Vives (3)
- Most nominations: Banda MS and Wisin (7)

Television coverage
- Network: Univision

The 29th Lo Nuestro Awards ceremony, presented by the American network Univision, honoring the best Latin music of 2016 in the United States, took place on February 23, 2017, at the American Airlines Arena in Miami, Florida beginning at 5:00 p.m. PST (8:00 p.m. EST). During the ceremony, Lo Nuestro Awards were presented in 26 categories. The ceremony was televised in the United States by Univision. Alejandra Espinoza and William Valdés hosted the show.

Latin American boyband CNCO, Colombian singer-songwriters Shakira and Carlos Vives, and Cuban ensemble Gente de Zona earned three awards each, including Pop/Rock Album of the Year and Pop Song of the Year for CNCO; Colombian reggaeton performer J Balvin received the Artist of the Year accolade for the second year in a row. American artist Romeo Santos received the Excellence Award and TV host Lili Estefan earned the Trajectory Award. The telecast garnered in average 10 million viewers in North America.

== Winners and nominees ==
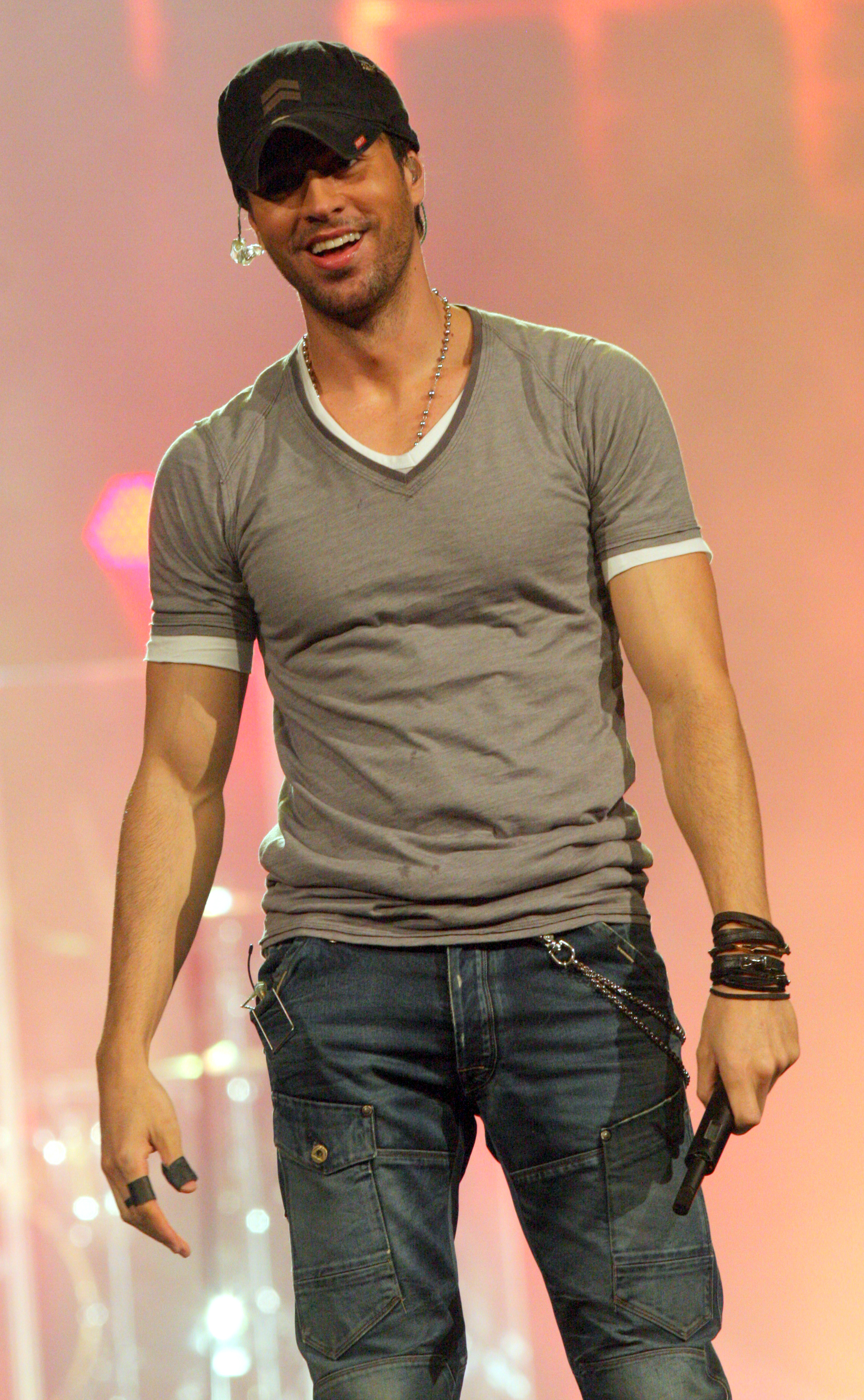
Spanish singer Enrique Iglesias (pictured in 2011), won Pop Male Artist and Collaboration of the Year in 2017 for the single "Duele el Corazón".

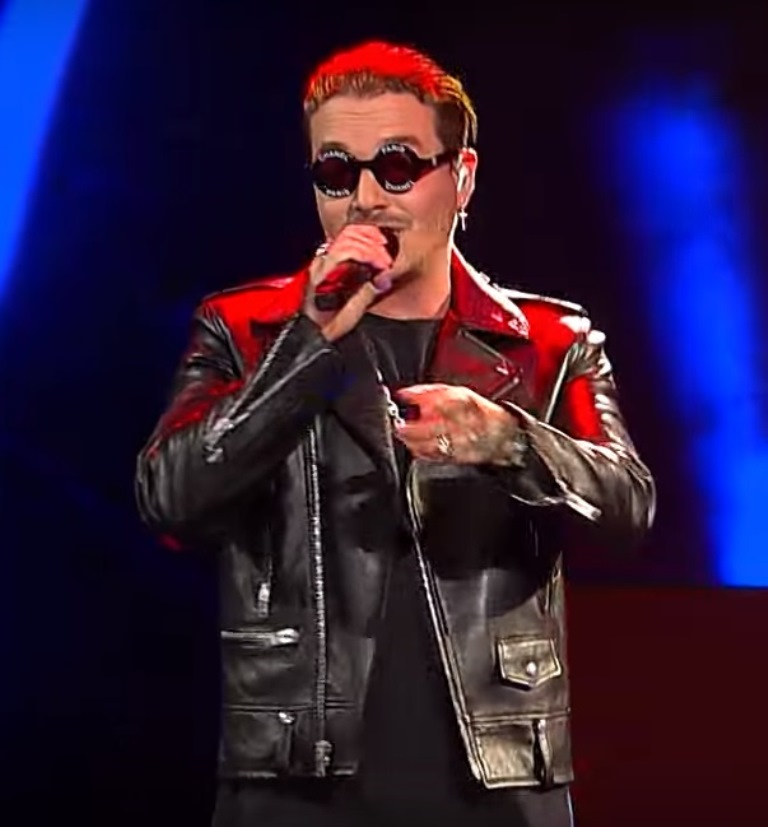
Colombian performer J Balvin (pictured in 2017), was awarded for Artist of the Year

On December 6, 2016, the nominees for the Lo Nuestro Awards of 2017 were announced through their official website. Mexican ensemble Banda Sinaloense MS de Sergio Lizárraga and reggaeton act Wisin received the most nominations with seven each. Among others, Banda MS was nominated for Artist of the Year, and won for Regional Mexican Album (Qué Bendición) and Regional Mexican Song ("Solo Con Verte"); Wisin earned the Collaboration of the Year for "Duele el Corazón", his Billboard Latin Songs number-one single performed alongside Spanish singer Enrique Iglesias; with the song, Iglesias became the male performer with the most number-one songs in the history of the Billboard Dance Club Songs chart, with 14. "La Bicicleta" by Carlos Vives and Shakira earned all the awards it was nominated for, which included Single of the Year, Video of the Year and Tropical Song.

Mexican artist Thalía was named Pop Female Artist, her first win in the category since 1998. Musical ensembles CNCO and Gente de Zona earned three awards each. J Balvin won for Artist of the Year for the second consecutive time. Romeo Santos received the Excellence Award and TV host Lili Estefan earned the Trajectory Award.

Winners are listed first, highlighted in boldface and indicated with a double-dagger (‡).

**Artist of the Year**: **J Balvin**‡; Banda Sinaloense MS de Sergio Lizárraga; Enrique Iglesias; Romeo Santos	**Collaboration of the Year**: **Enrique Iglesias featuring Wisin** – **"Duele el Corazón"**‡; Gente de Zona featuring Marc Anthony – "Traidora"; Adriel Favela featuring Los del Arroyo – "Tomen Nota"; Ken-Y featuring Nicky Jam – "Como Lo Hacía Yo"
**Album of the Year**: **Gente de Zona – Visualízate**‡; Farruko – Visionary; Carla Morrison – Amor Supremo; Los Plebes del Rancho de Ariel Camacho – Recuerden Mi Estilo	**Single of the Year**: **Carlos Vives and Shakira – "La Bicicleta"**‡; Banda Sinaloense MS de Sergio Lizárraga – "Sólo con Verte"; Enrique Iglesias featuring Wisin – "Duele el Corazón"; Nicky Jam – "Hasta el Amanecer"
**Female Artist of the Year**: **Chiquis Rivera**‡; India; Karol G; Sofía Reyes	**Male Artist of the Year**: **J Balvin**‡; Julión Álvarez; Enrique Iglesias; Romeo Santos
**Group of Duo of the Year**: **Gente de Zona**‡; Banda Sinaloense MS de Sergio Lizárraga; Maná; Zion & Lennox	**Video of the Year**: **Carlos Vives and Shakira – "La Bicicleta"**‡; J Balvin featuring Pharrell Williams, BIA and Sky – "Safari"; Bomba Estéreo – "Soy Yo"; Chino & Nacho featuring Daddy Yankee – "Andas En Mi Cabeza"; Pablo López featuring Juanes – "Tu Enemigo"
**Pop Album**: **CNCO – Primera Cita**‡; Christian Daniel – Renacer; Jesse & Joy – Un Besito Más; Reik – Des/Amor; Thalía – Latina	**Pop Song**: **CNCO – "Tan Fácil"**‡; Jesse & Joy featuring Alejandro Sanz – "No Soy Una de Esas"; Enrique Iglesias featuring Wisin – "Duele el Corazón"; Maná – "Ironía"; Reik featuring Nicky Jam – "Ya Me Enteré (Urban Version)"; Sofía Reyes featuring Prince Royce – "Solo Yo"
**Pop Male Artist**: **Enrique Iglesias**‡; Christian Daniel; Ricky Martin; Marco Antonio Solís	**Pop Female Artist**: **Thalía**‡; Leslie Grace; Sofía Reyes; Gloria Trevi
**Pop Duo or Group**: **CNCO**‡; Jesse & Joy; Maná; Reik
**Regional Mexican Album**: **Banda Sinaloense MS de Sergio Lizárraga – Qué Bendición**‡; Banda Carnaval – Hombre de Trabajo; Banda Los Recoditos – Me Está Gustando; Calibre 50 – Historias de La Calle; Remmy Valenzuela – Mi Princesa	**Regional Mexican Song**: **Banda Sinaloense MS de Sergio Lizárraga – "Solo Con Verte"**‡; La Arrolladora Banda El Limón de René Camacho – "Ya Te Perdí La Fe"; Banda El Recodo de Cruz Lizárraga – "Si No Es Contigo"; Banda Los Recoditos – "Pistearé"; Calibre 50 – "Préstamela a Mi"; Régulo Caro – "Cicatrices"
**Regional Mexican Artist**: **Julión Álvarez**‡; Régulo Caro; Gerardo Ortíz; Remmy Valenzuela	**Regional Mexican Group or Duo of the Year**: **Calibre 50**‡; La Arrolladora Banda El Limón de René Camacho; Banda Sinaloense MS de Sergio Lizárraga; La Séptima Banda
**Banda Artist**: **Julión Álvarez**‡; La Arrolladora Banda El Limón de René Camacho; Banda Sinaloense MS de Sergio Lizárraga; La Séptima Banda	**Norteño Artist**: **Gerardo Ortíz**‡; Calibre 50; La Maquinaria Norteña; Los Plebes del Rancho de Ariel Camacho
**Tropical Album**: **Gente de Zona – Visualízate**‡; 24 Horas – Tiempo; Fonseca – Conexión; Grupo Niche – 35 Aniversario; Charlie Zaa – Mi Mejor Regalo	**Tropical Song**: **Carlos Vives and Shakira – "La Bicicleta"**‡; Gente de Zona featuring Marc Anthony – "Traidora"; Chino & Nacho featuring Daddy Yankee – "Andas En Mi Cabeza"; Prince Royce – "Culpa al Corazón"; Prince Royce – "La Carretera"; Carlos Vives – "Las Cosas de la Vida"
**Tropical Artist**: **Prince Royce**‡; Chino & Nacho; Gente de Zona; Romeo Santos; Víctor Manuelle; Carlos Vives	**Urban Artist of the Year**: **Maluma**‡; J Balvin; Daddy Yankee; Farruko; Nicky Jam; Wisin; Yandel; Zion & Lennox
**Urban Album of the Year**: **Maluma – Pretty Boy, Dirty Boy**‡; J Balvin – Energía; Farruko – Visionary; Wisin – Los Vaqueros: La Trilogía; Yandel – Dangerous	**Urban Song of the Year**: **Nicky Jam – "Hasta el Amanecer"**‡; J Balvin – "Bobo"; Daddy Yankee – "Vaivén"; Maluma – "El Perdedor"; Yandel – "Encantadora"
**Urban Collaboration of the Year**: **IamChino featuring Pitbull, Yandel and Chacal – "Ay Mi Dios"**‡; Antonio Baullo featuring J Alvarez and Flex – "Disfruta la Vida"; Farruko featuring Ky-Mani Marley – "Chillax"; Luny Tunes featuring Daddy Yankee, Wisin, Don Omar, and Yandel – "Mayor Que Yo 3"; Ken-Y featuring Nicky Jam – "Como lo Hacía Yo"; Play-N-Skillz and Daddy Yankee – "Not a Crime"; Wisin featuring Ricky Martin – "Que Se Sienta El Deseo"

== Ceremony information ==
=== Categories and voting process ===
The categories considered were for the Pop, Tropical, Regional Mexican, and Urban genres, with additional awards for the General Field that includes nominees from all genres, for the Artist of the Year, Album of the Year, Single of the Year, Male and Female Artist, Duo or Group, Collaboration and Music Video categories. The nominees were selected through an online voting poll at the official website and a total of 70 artist were included in the nominations; the winners were chosen from a total 26 different categories. The ceremony was hosted by Mexican model Alejandra Espinoza and Cuban actor William Valdés.

=== Ratings and reception ===
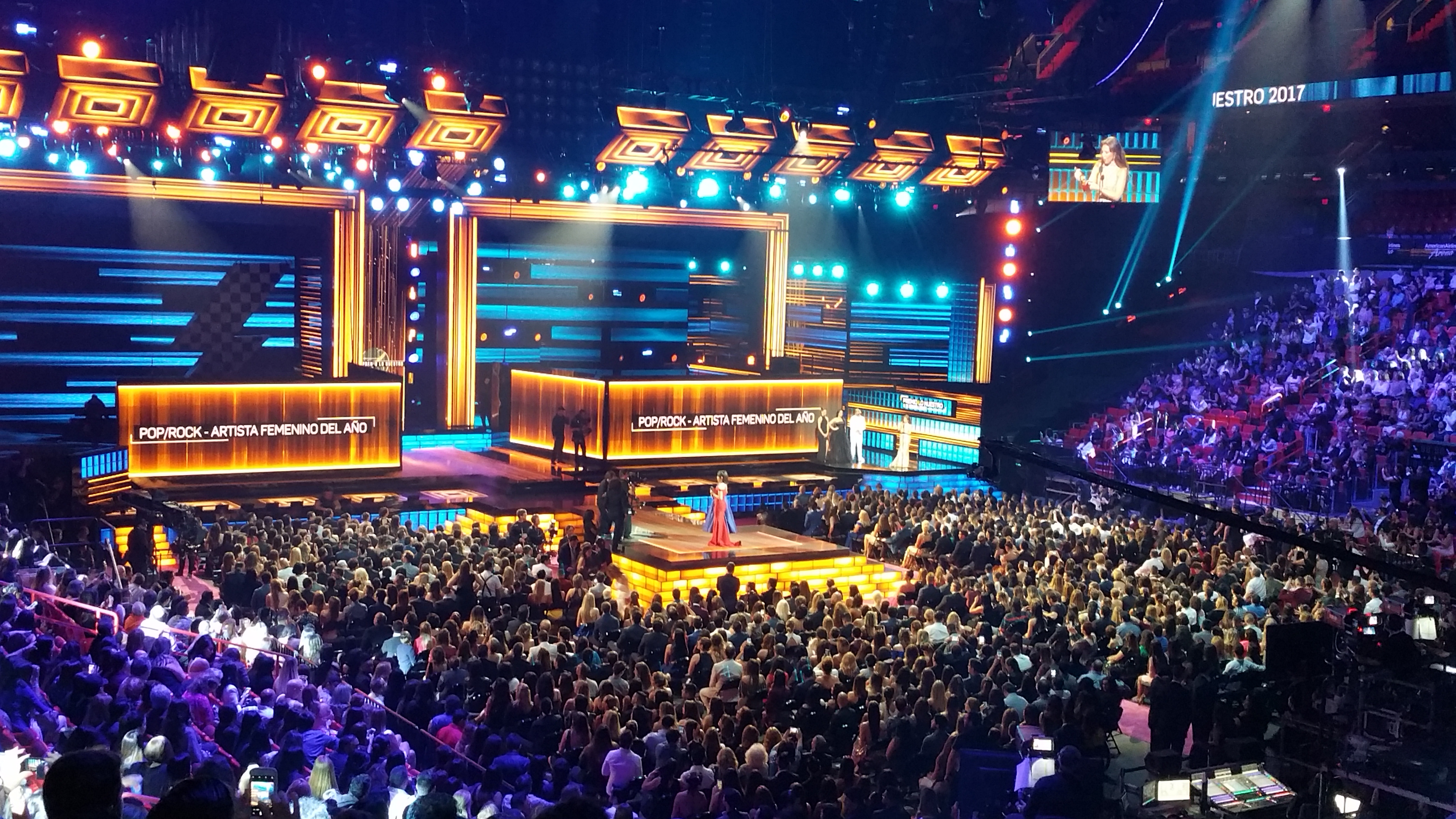
The stage for the award during 2017.

The American telecast on Univision drew in an average 10 million people during its three hours of length. Univision was third in the ratings during its first two hours, but rose to number one in the third, last hour of the broadcast. According to Glenn Santana of the newspaper Primera Hora, the ratings were lower comparing to those of the previous year, and they have continually decreased since 2011 when they registered 26.4 million viewers.
