= Latin American Music Awards of 2015 =

1st Annual Latin American Music Awards
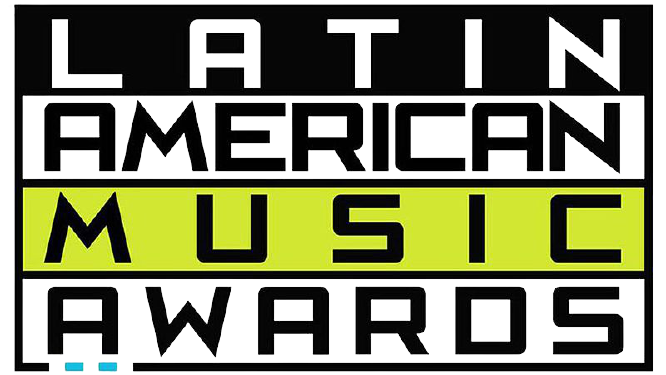
- Date: October 8, 2015
- Location: Dolby Theatre; Los Angeles, California
- Country: United States
- Hosted by: Lucero
- Most awards: Enrique Iglesias (5)
- Most nominations: Nicky Jam (6)
- Website: Telemundo-Latin American Music Awards

Television/radio coverage
- Network: Telemundo
- Runtime: 180 minutes
- Produced by: Dick Clark Productions

The 1st Latin American Music Awards was held on October 8, 2015, at the Dolby Theatre in Los Angeles, California. It was broadcast live on Telemundo. The nominations were announced on September 2, 2015, on Telemundo's website. Nicky Jam leads the nominees with six nominations. Lucero was announced as a host on October 2, 2015. Rashel Diaz, Boris Izaguirre, Christian Ramirez, Kika Rocha, and Caeli were all announced co-hosts of the pre-show on the same day.

== Performances ==
Artist(s)	Song(s)
Daddy Yankee	"Sígueme y Te Sigo" "Vaiven"
Paulina Rubio	"Si Te Vas"
Gloria Trevi	"Las Pequeñas Cosas"
Reik; Yuri	"Duele"
Yandel; Lil Jon	"Calentura"

- Gloria Trevi
- Gerardo Ortiz
- Il Volo
- Gerardo Ortiz
- Lil Jon
- Yandel
- Natalie La Rose
- Jencarlos Canela
- Gerardo Ortíz
- Maluma
- Luis Coronel
- CD9
- Paulina Rubio
- Daddy Yankee
- Jesse & Joy
- Yuri
- Reik
- Farruko
- Fonseca
- Shaggy

== Winners and nominees ==
Artist of the Year	Xfinity New Artist of the Year
Enrique Iglesias; Calibre 50; Julión Álvarez y su Norteño Banda; Nicky Jam; Romeo Santos	J Balvin; Chiquis Rivera; Maluma; Remmy Valenzuela
Song of the Year	Album of the Year
"El Perdón" – Nicky Jam and Enrique Iglesias; "Ay Vamos" – J Balvin; "Contigo" – Calibre 50; "Hilito" – Romeo Santos; "Fanática Sensual" – Plan B	A Quien Quiera Escuchar – Ricky Martin; Cama Incendiada – Maná; Hoy Más Fuerte – Gerardo Ortíz; Los Dúo – Juan Gabriel; Mis Número 1...40 Aniversario – Juan Gabriel
Favorite Female Artist	Favorite Pop/Rock Male Artist
Gloria Trevi; Chiquis Rivera; Fanny Lu; Natalia Jiménez	Enrique Iglesias; Chayanne; Juan Gabriel; Marco Antonio Solís; Ricky Martin
Favorite Pop/Rock Duo or Group	Favorite Pop/Rock Song
Camila; Jesse & Joy; Maná; Reik	"La Mordidita" – Ricky Martin featuring Yotuel; "Mi Verdad" – Maná featuring Shakira; "Perdón" – Camila featuring Ricky Martin
Favorite Regional Mexican Male Artist	Favorite Regional Mexican Band, Duo, or Group
Luis Coronel; Gerardo Ortíz; Régulo Caro	Julión Álvarez y su Norteño Banda; Banda el Recodo de Cruz Lizárraga; Banda Sinaloense MS de Sergio Lizárraga; Calibre 50
Favorite Regional Mexican Song	Favorite Urban Male Artist
"Y Así Fue" – Julión Álvarez; "Háblame de Ti" – Banda Sinaloense MS de Sergio Lizárraga; "Contigo" – Calibre 50	Daddy Yankee; J Balvin; Nicky Jam; Don Omar; Yandel
Favorite Urban Duo or Group	Favorite Urban Song
Gente de Zona; Plan B; Zion & Lennox	"Sígueme y Te Sigo" – Daddy Yankee; "Ay Vamos" – J Balvin; "Pierdo la Cabeza" – Zion & Lennox
Favorite Tropical Artist	Favorite Tropical Song
Romeo Santos; Chino & Nacho; Juan Luis Guerra; Víctor Manuelle	"La Gozadera" – Gente de Zona featuring Marc Anthony; "Hilito" – Romeo Santos; "Me Voy Enamorando" – Chino & Nacho featuring Farruko; "Solita" – Prince Royce
Favorite Collaboration	Favorite Crossover Artist
"El Perdón" – Nicky Jam and Enrique Iglesias; "Como Yo le Doy" – Pitbull and Don Miguelo; "Mi Verdad" – Maná featuring Shakira; "Nota de Amor" – Wisin and Carlos Vives featuring Daddy Yankee	Demi Lovato; Ellie Goulding; Meghan Trainor; Natalie La Rose; OMI
Favorite Dance Song	Favorite Streaming Song
"I Want You to Know" – Zedd featuring Selena Gomez; "Where Are Ü Now" – Skrillex and Diplo with Justin Bieber; "Lean On" – Major Lazer and DJ Snake featuring MØ; "You Know You Like It" – DJ Snake and AlunaGeorge; "Back It Up" – Prince Royce featuring Jennifer Lopez	"El Perdón" – Nicky Jam and Enrique Iglesias; "Travesuras" – Nicky Jam; "Ay Vamos" – J Balvin; "Háblame de Ti" – Banda Sinaloense MS de Sergio Lizárraga; "Fanática Sensual" – Plan B

== Multiple nominations and awards ==
Acts that received multiple nominations
Nominations	Act
6	Nicky Jam
5	J Balvin
5	Enrique Iglesias
4	Calibre 50
4	Maná
4	Romeo Santos
3	Daddy Yankee
3	Banda Sinaloense MS de Sergio Lizárraga
3	Juan Gabriel
3	Julión Álvarez y su Norteño Banda
3	Plan B
3	Ricky Martin
2	Camila
2	Chino & Nacho
2	Chiquis Rivera
2	DJ Snake
2	Gente de Zona
2	Gerardo Ortíz
2	Prince Royce
2	Shakira
2	Zion & Lennox

Acts that received multiple awards
Awards	Act
5	Enrique Iglesias
3	Nicky Jam
2	Daddy Yankee
2	Gente de Zona
2	Julión Álvarez y su Norteño Banda
2	Ricky Martin
