= Latin American Music Awards of 2016 =

2nd Annual Latin American Music Awards
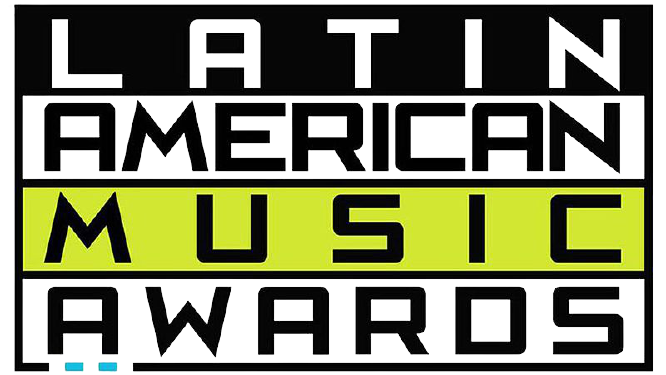
- Date: October 6, 2016
- Location: Dolby Theatre; Los Angeles, California
- Country: United States
- Hosted by: Lucero
- Most awards: Enrique Iglesias (5)
- Most nominations: Banda MS and Yandel (6)
- Website: Telemundo-Latin American Music Awards

Television/radio coverage
- Network: Telemundo
- Runtime: 180 minutes
- Produced by: Dick Clark Productions

The 2nd Annual Latin American Music Awards were held at the Dolby Theatre in Los Angeles, California. It was broadcast live on Telemundo. Lucero was announced as the host on August 31. Banda MS and Yandel led the nominations with six each.

== Performances ==
- CNCO
- Gerardo Ortiz
- Gente de Zona
- Jesse & Joy
- Prince Royce
- Jay Ruiz
- Víctor Manuelle
- Dvicio
- Lucero
- Pitbull
- Sofía Reyes
- Banda MS
- Flo Rida
- Miguel Bosé
- Joey Montana
- Alvaro Soler
- Baby Rasta & Gringo
- Franco de Vita
- La Santa Cecilia
- Becky G
- Nicky Jam
- ChocQuibTown
- LunchMoney Lewis
- Jacob Forever
- Aymee Nuviola

== Nominees ==
The nominations were announced on August 31.

Artist of the Year	Xfinity New Artist of the Year
Enrique Iglesias; Banda Sinaloense MS de Sergio Lizárraga; J Balvin; Los Plebes del Rancho de Ariel Camacho; Nicky Jam	CNCO; Adriel Favela; Álvaro Soler; Jacob Forever; Sofía Reyes
Song of the Year	Album of the Year
"Duele el Corazón" – Enrique Iglesias featuring Wisin; "Encantadora" - Yandel; "Ginza" – J Balvin; "Hasta el Amanecer – Nicky Jam; "Solo Con Verte" – Banda Sinaloense MS de Sergio Lizárraga	Dangerous – Yandel; Dale – Pitbull; Los Dúo, Vol. 2 – Juan Gabriel; Que Bendición – Banda Sinaloense MS de Sergio Lizárraga; Recuerden Mi Estilo – Los Plebes del Rancho de Ariel Camacho
Favorite Pop/Rock Female Artist	Favorite Pop/Rock Male Artist
Becky G; Gloria Trevi; Shakira	Enrique Iglesias; Christian Daniel; Juan Gabriel
Favorite Pop/Rock Duo or Group	Favorite Pop/Rock New Artist
CNCO; Jesse & Joy; Maná	CNCO; Álvaro Soler; Sofia Reyes
Favorite Pop/Rock Album	Favorite Pop/Rock Song
El Amor – Gloria Trevi; Los Dúo, Vol. 2 – Juan Gabriel; Un Besito Más – Jesse & Joy	"Duele el Corazón" – Enrique Iglesias featuring Wisin; "Andas en Mi Cabeza" – Chino & Nacho featuring Daddy Yankee; "El Mismo Sol" – Alvaro Soler featuring Jennifer Lopez; "No Soy Una de Esas" – Jesse & Joy featuring Alejandro Sanz
Favorite Regional Mexican Artist	Favorite Regional Mexican New Artist
Geraldo Ortiz; Remmy Valenzuela; Roberto Tapia	Adriel Favela; Banda Clave Nueva de Max Peraza; La Séptima Banda
Favorite Regional Mexican Duo or Group	Favorite Regional Mexican Album
Banda Sinaloense MS de Sergio Lizárraga; Julión Álvarez y Su Norteño Banda; Los Plebes del Rancho de Ariel Camacho	Que Bendición – Banda Sinaloense MS de Sergio Lizárraga; Mis Ídolos, Hoy Mis Amigos!!! – Julión Álvarez y Su Norteño Banda; Recuerden Mi Estilo – Los Plebes del Rancho de Ariel Camacho
Favorite Regional Mexican Song	Favorite Urban Artist
"Solo Con Verte" – Banda Sinaloense MS de Sergio Lizárraga; "¿Cuál Adiós?" – Banda Clave Nueva de Max Peraza; "Después de Ti, ¿Quién?" – La Addictiva Banda San José de Mesillas; "Préstamela A Mí" – Calibre 50	J Balvin; Nicky Jam; Yandel
Favorite Urban New Artist	Favorite Urban Duo or Group
Jacob Forever; Karol G; Osmani Garcia	Zion & Lennox; Alexis & Fido; Baby Rasta & Gringo
Favorite Urban Album	Favorite Urban Song
Visionary – Farruko; Dale – Pitbull; Dangerous – Yandel	"Ginza" – J Balvin; "Borró Cassette" - Maluma; "Encantadora" - Yandel; "Hasta el Amanecer" – Nicky Jam
Favorite Tropical Artist	Favorite Tropical New Artist
Prince Royce; Gente de Zona; Victor Manuelle	Pirulo y La Tribu; Jay Ruiz; Johnthan Moly
Favorite Tropical Album	Favorite Tropical Song
Visualízate – Gente de Zona; Intensamente con Canciones de Juan Gabriel – India; Mi Mejor Regalo – Charlie Zaa	"Culpa al Corazón" – Prince Royce; "Culpables" – Jay Ruiz; "No Quería Engañarte" – Victor Manuelle; "Traidora" – Gente de Zona featuring Marc Anthony
Favorite Collaboration	Favorite Crossover Artist
"Duele el Corazón" – Enrique Iglesias featuring Wisin; "El Perdedor" – Maluma featuring Yandel; "Te Busco" – Cosculluela featuring Nicky Jam	Justin Bieber; Drake; Meghan Trainor
Favorite Crossover Song	Favorite Dance Song
"Love Yourself" – Justin Bieber; "Hello" – Adele; "One Dance" – Drake featuring Wizkid and Kyla	"This Is What You Came For" – Calvin Harris featuring Rihanna; "Don’t Let Me Down" – The Chainsmokers featuring Daya; "Never Forget You" – MNEK and Zara Larsson

== Multiple nominations and awards ==
Acts that received multiple nominations
Nominations	Act
6	Banda Sinaloense MS de Sergio Lizárraga
6	Yandel
5	Enrique Iglesias
5	Nicky Jam
4	J Balvin
4	Los Plebes del Rancho de Ariel Camacho
3	Álvaro Soler
3	CNCO
3	Gente de Zona
3	Jesse & Joy
3	Juan Gabriel
3	Wisin
2	Adriel Favela
2	Banda Clave Nueva de Max Peraza
2	Drake
2	Gloria Trevi
2	Jacob Forever
2	Jay Ruiz
2	Julión Álvarez y Su Norteño Banda
2	Justin Bieber
2	Maluma
2	Pitbull
2	Prince Royce
2	Sofía Reyes
2	Víctor Manuelle

Acts that received multiple awards
Awards	Act
5	Enrique Iglesias
3	Banda Sinaloense MS de Sergio Lizárraga
3	CNCO
3	Wisin
2	J Balvin
2	Justin Bieber
2	Prince Royce
