= List of number-one Billboard Regional Mexican Songs of 2017 =

The Billboard Regional Mexican Songs chart ranks the best-performing Regional Mexican singles in the United States. Published weekly by Billboard magazine, it ranks the "most popular regional Mexican songs, ranked by radio airplay audience impressions as measured by Nielsen Music."

== Chart history ==
Key
†	Indicates best-performing song of 2017

Issue date	Song	Artist(s)	Ref.
January 7	"Tengo Que Colgar"	Banda Sinaloense MS de Sergio Lizárraga	
January 14	"Regresa Hermosa"	Gerardo Ortíz	
January 21	"Regresa Hermosa"	Gerardo Ortíz	
January 28	"Tengo Que Colgar"	Banda Sinaloense MS de Sergio Lizárraga	
February 4	"Tengo Que Colgar"	Banda Sinaloense MS de Sergio Lizárraga	
February 11	"Afuera Esta Lloviendo"	Julión Álvarez y su Norteño Banda	
February 18	"Afuera Esta Lloviendo"	Julión Álvarez y su Norteño Banda	
February 25	"Afuera Esta Lloviendo"	Julión Álvarez y su Norteño Banda	
March 4	"Afuera Esta Lloviendo"	Julión Álvarez y su Norteño Banda	
March 11	"Siempre Te Voy a Querer"	Calibre 50	
March 18	"Siempre Te Voy a Querer"	Calibre 50	
March 25	"Siempre Te Voy a Querer"	Calibre 50	
April 1	"Siempre Te Voy a Querer"	Calibre 50	
April 8	"Adios Amor"	Christian Nodal	
April 15	"Adios Amor"	Christian Nodal	
April 22	"Adios Amor"	Christian Nodal	
April 29	"Es Tuyo Mi Amor"	Banda Sinaloense MS de Sergio Lizárraga	
May 6	"Es Tuyo Mi Amor"	Banda Sinaloense MS de Sergio Lizárraga	
May 13	"Adios Amor"	Christian Nodal	
May 20	"Adios Amor"	Christian Nodal	
May 27	"Adios Amor"	Christian Nodal	
June 3	"Te Regalo"	Ulices Chaidez y Sus Plebes	
June 10	"Te Regalo"	Ulices Chaidez y Sus Plebes	
June 17	"Durmiendo En El Lugar Equivocado"	La Adictiva Banda San Jose de Mesillas	
June 24	"Se Defiende"	La Septima Banda	
July 1	"Las Ultras"	Calibre 50	
July 8	"Las Ultras"	Calibre 50	
July 15	"Las Ultras"	Calibre 50	
July 22	"Las Ultras"	Calibre 50	
July 29	"Ella Es Mi Mujer"	Banda Carnaval	
August 5	"Las Ultras"	Calibre 50	
August 12	"Las Cosas No Se Hacen Asi"	Banda Sinaloense MS de Sergio Lizarraga	
August 19	"Las Cosas No Se Hacen Asi"	Banda Sinaloense MS de Sergio Lizarraga	
August 26	"Las Cosas No Se Hacen Asi"	Banda Sinaloense MS de Sergio Lizarraga	
September 2	"Porque Me Enamore"	Ulices Chaidez y Sus Plebes	
September 9	"Porque Me Enamore"	Ulices Chaidez y Sus Plebes	
September 16	"Porque Me Enamore"	Ulices Chaidez y Sus Plebes	
September 23	"Porque Me Enamore"	Ulices Chaidez y Sus Plebes	
September 30	"Probablemente"	Christian Nodal Featuring David Bisbal	
October 7	"Probablemente"	Christian Nodal Featuring David Bisbal	
October 14	"Probablemente"	Christian Nodal Featuring David Bisbal	
October 21	"Probablemente"	Christian Nodal Featuring David Bisbal	
October 28	"Corrido de Juanito"	Calibre 50	
November 4	"Corrido de Juanito"	Calibre 50	
November 11	"Corrido de Juanito"	Calibre 50	
November 18	"El Color de Tus Ojos"	Banda Sinaloense MS de Sergio Lizárraga	
November 25	"El Color de Tus Ojos"	Banda Sinaloense MS de Sergio Lizárraga	
December 2	"El Color de Tus Ojos"	Banda Sinaloense MS de Sergio Lizárraga	
December 9	"Como No Adorarla"	Banda Carnaval	
December 16	"El Color de Tus Ojos"	Banda Sinaloense MS de Sergio Lizárraga	
December 23	"El Color de Tus Ojos"	Banda Sinaloense MS de Sergio Lizárraga	
December 30	"El Color de Tus Ojos"	Banda Sinaloense MS de Sergio Lizárraga	
