= Mis Ídolos, Hoy Mis Amigos!!! =

Studio album by Julión Álvarez y su Norteño Banda
- Released: April 8, 2016
- Genre: Banda
- Length: 1:02:33
- Language: Spanish
- Label: Fonovisa
- Producer: Julión Álvarez (executive)

Julión Álvarez y su Norteño Banda chronology
El Aferrado (2015)	Mis Ídolos, Hoy Mis Amigos!!! (2016)	Ni Diablo, Ni Santo (2017)

Singles from Mis Ídolos, Hoy Mis Amigos!!!
- 1. "El Guitarrero" Released: April 1, 2016; 2. "Hay Amores" Released: April 1, 2016; 3. "Cariñito Cariñito" Released: April 1, 2016

Mis Ídolos, Hoy Mis Amigos!!! (English: My Idols, Today My Friends!!!) is the ninth studio album by Mexican group Julión Álvarez y su Norteño Banda, released on April 8, 2016, by Fonovisa Records. The album was produced by Álvarez and features a mixture of banda and norteño music. The first three tracks are originals sung as duets with El Coyote ("El Guitarrero"), Pancho Barraza ("Hay Amores"), and Julio Preciado ("Cariñito Cariñito"). The other seventeen tracks are covers of El Coyote's, Barraza's, and Preciado's songs.

Mis Ídolos, Hoy Mis Amigos!!! reached number one on the Billboard Top Latin Albums chart in the United States. The album was nominated for Best Banda Album at the 17th Annual Latin Grammy Awards in 2016.

== Promotion ==
To promote the album, Álvarez launched a 22-City Arena tour, touring throughout the United States. It started on July 15 in San Jose, California.

== Commercial reception ==
In the United States, it peaked at number one on the Billboard Top Latin Albums and the Billboard Regional Mexican Albums charts. Mis Ídolos, Hoy Mis Amigos!!! garnered Álvarez a nomination for Best Banda Album at the 17th Annual Latin Grammy Awards in 2016. Mis Ídolos, Hoy Mis Amigos!!! was nominated for Favorite Regional Mexican Album at the Latin American Music Awards of 2016, but lost to Banda MS' album, Qué Bendición.

== Track listing ==
No.	Title	Writer(s)	Producer(s)	Length
1.	"El Guitarrero (feat. El Coyote)"	Álvarez	Álvarez	3:25
2.	"Hay Amores (feat. Pancho Barraza)"	Álvarez	Álvarez	3:15
3.	"Cariñito Cariñito (feat. Julio Preciado)"	Álvarez, Edgar Cervera	Álvarez	2:33
4.	"Arráncame la Vida"	Amed Lepe Torres	Álvarez	2:52
5.	"Mi Enemigo el Amor"	Francisco Javier Barraza Rodriguez	Álvarez	3:53
6.	"Como le Haré Para Olvidarte"	Mario Aguilar	Álvarez	3:05
7.	"Pero la Recuerdo"	Barraza Rodriguez	Álvarez	3:35
8.	"Amor Pajarito"	Jose Francisco Garza	Álvarez	2:37
9.	"Que Solo Estoy Sin Ti"	Marco Antonio Solís	Álvarez	3:50
10.	"Las Dos Hectáreas"	Julio Preciado	Álvarez	3:07
11.	"Engañado"	Francisco Acosta	Álvarez	2:27
12.	"Ya Se Fue"	Barraza Rodriguez	Álvarez	3:18
13.	"Esos Ojitos Negros"	Antonio Valdez Herrera	Álvarez	2:45
14.	"Leña de Pirul"	Tomás Méndez Sosa	Álvarez	2:52
15.	"Mi Amor y Mi Agonía"	Barraza Rodriguez	Álvarez	3:12
16.	"El Molino"	Teodoro Bello Jaimes	Álvarez	2:43
17.	"Como el Primer Día"	Oliver Ochoa López	Álvarez	2:55
18.	"Profundamente"	Ariel Barreras	Álvarez	3:05
19.	"Ignoraste Mis Lágrimas"	Barraza Rodriguez	Álvarez	3:05
20.	"No Puedo Olvidar Tu Voz"	Miguel Angel Ruiz	Álvarez	3:55

== Charts ==
=== Weekly charts ===
Chart (2016)	Peak position
US Billboard 200	182
US Top Latin Albums (Billboard)	1
US Regional Mexican Albums (Billboard)	1

=== Year-end charts ===
Chart (2016)	P0sition
US Top Latin Albums (Billboard)	11

== See also ==
- 2016 in Latin music
- List of number-one Billboard Latin Albums from the 2010s
