= Olvídame =

Olvídame may refer to:

- "Olvídame", a song by Julión Álvarez from his album Márchate y Olvídame, also included in the compilation album Puros Trankazos, 2011
- "Olvídame", a song by Motel from their album Motel, 2006
- "Olvídame", a song by Thalía from her album El Sexto Sentido, 2005
