= Me Estoy Enamorando =

Me Estoy Enamorando may refer to:

- Me Estoy Enamorando (album), 1997 album by Alejandro Fernández
- "Me Estoy Enamorando", 2012 song by Inspector (band)
- "Me Estoy Enamorando", 1992 song by Jerry Rivera from the album Cuenta Conmigo
- "Me Estoy Enamorando", 1995 song by Paulina Rubio from the album El tiempo es oro
- "Me Estoy Enamorando", 1992 song by La Mafia from the album Ahora y Siempre

== See also ==
- "Me Voy Enamorando", 2015 song by Chino y Nacho
