= List of Billboard Regional Mexican Albums number ones of 2011 =

Regional Mexican Albums is a record chart published in Billboard magazine that features Latin music sales information for regional styles of Mexican music. This data are compiled by Nielsen SoundScan from a sample that includes music stores, music departments at department stores and verifiable sales from concert venues in the United States.

== Number-one albums ==
Issue date	Album	Artist(s)	Reference(s)
January 1	El Hombre Que Más Te Amó	Vicente Fernández	
January 8	El Hombre Que Más Te Amó	Vicente Fernández	
January 15	El Árbol	Los Tucanes de Tijuana	
January 22	El Árbol	Los Tucanes de Tijuana	
January 29	El Árbol	Los Tucanes de Tijuana	
February 5	35 Aniversario	Los Bukis	
February 12	35 Aniversario	Los Bukis	
February 19	35 Aniversario	Los Bukis	
February 26	35 Aniversario	Los Bukis	
March 5	35 Aniversario	Los Bukis	
March 12	35 Aniversario	Los Bukis	
March 19	35 Aniversario	Los Bukis	
March 26	35 Aniversario	Los Bukis	
April 2	35 Aniversario	Los Bukis	
April 9	2011	Intocable	
April 16	Morir Y Existir: En Vivo	Gerardo Ortiz	
April 23	Los Huevos Rancheros	Joan Sebastian	
April 30	Los Huevos Rancheros	Joan Sebastian	
May 7	Un Siglo De Amor	Tierra Cali	
May 14	Los Huevos Rancheros	Joan Sebastian	
May 21	Los Huevos Rancheros	Joan Sebastian	
May 28	Los Huevos Rancheros	Joan Sebastian	
June 4	Llegamos y Nos Quedamos	Conjunto Atardecer	
June 11	MTV Unplugged: Los Tigres del Norte and Friends	Los Tigres del Norte	
June 18	MTV Unplugged: Los Tigres del Norte and Friends	Los Tigres del Norte	
June 25	MTV Unplugged: Los Tigres del Norte and Friends	Los Tigres del Norte	
July 2	MTV Unplugged: Los Tigres del Norte and Friends	Los Tigres del Norte	
July 9	MTV Unplugged: Los Tigres del Norte and Friends	Los Tigres del Norte	
July 26	MTV Unplugged: Los Tigres del Norte and Friends	Los Tigres del Norte	
July 23	MTV Unplugged: Los Tigres del Norte and Friends	Los Tigres del Norte	
July 30	MTV Unplugged: Los Tigres del Norte and Friends	Los Tigres del Norte	
August 6	Puros Trankazos	Various Artists	
August 13	Puros Trankazos	Various Artists	
August 20	Puros Trankazos	Various Artists	
August 27	Puros Trankazos	Various Artists	
September 3	Puros Trankazos	Various Artists	
September 10	Puros Trankazos	Various Artists	
September 17	Puros Trankazos	Various Artists	
September 24	Entre Dios y El Diablo	Gerardo Ortiz	
October 1	Entre Dios y El Diablo	Gerardo Ortiz	
October 8	Entre Dios y El Diablo	Gerardo Ortiz	
October 15	Canciones Que Duelen	Espinoza Paz	
October 22	Canciones Que Duelen	Espinoza Paz	
October 29	Entre Dios y El Diablo	Gerardo Ortiz	
November 5	Entre Dios y El Diablo	Gerardo Ortiz	
November 12	Entre Dios y El Diablo	Gerardo Ortiz	
November 19	Entre Dios y El Diablo	Gerardo Ortiz	
November 26	La Mejor de Todas	Banda El Recodo de Cruz Lizarraga	
December 3	Radio Exitos: El Disco Del Ano 2011	Various Artists	
December 10	Joyas Prestadas: Banda	Jenni Rivera	
December 17	Joyas Prestadas: Banda	Jenni Rivera	
December 24	Joyas Prestadas: Banda	Jenni Rivera	
December 31	Inténtalo	3Ball MTY	
