= Puros Trankazos =

Compilation album by Various Artists
- Released: July 16, 2011
- Genre: Regional Mexican
- Length: 38:08
- Label: Fonovisa

Fonovisa Records chronology
Puros Trankazos (2011)	Más Trankazos (2011)

Puros Trankazos (Huge Hits) is a compilation album released by Fonovisa Records on July 16, 2011. The album includes tracks recorded by several artists from the regional Mexican genre, such as Julión Álvarez y su Norteño Banda, Voz de Mando, Vagón Chicano, Enigma Norteño, Larry Hernández, Los Horóscopos de Durango, Chuy Lizárraga y su Banda Tierra Sinaloense, Grupo Violento, Banda Sinaloense MS de Sergio Lizárraga, El Chapo de Sinaloa, Fidel Rueda and Alfredo Olivas.

Upon release, the album peaked at No. 1 on the Billboard Top Latin Albums chart for three non-consecutive weeks. Puros Trankazos also peaked at the top of the Regional Mexican Albums chart. The first track, "Olvídame", performed by Julión Álvarez y su Norteño Banda and available exclusively to this release, reached the top five of the Latin Songs chart in the United States. A second volume of the album was released in November 2011, titled Más Trankazos.

== Background and repertoire ==
Puros Trankazos (Huge Hits) was released by Fonovisa Records on July 16, 2011, in the United States. The compilation album includes three tracks not available on other albums, such as "Olvídame", performed by Julión Álvarez y su Norteño Banda, the underground hit "La Hummer y el Camaro" by Voz de Mando, and "Como la Gelatina" written by Espinoza Paz and performed by Vagón Chicano. Another song written by Espinoza Paz, "Dónde Estás Presumida" by Chuy Lizárraga and his Banda Tierra Sinaloense is included. The track reached the top 10 on the Billboard Latin Songs chart. Larry Hernández and Voz de Mando were up-and-coming acts at the time of the album's release. They perform narcocorridos (narrative songs that tell the stories of drug dealers and their exploits). Hernández performs "El Ardido", a norteño waltz ranchera of lost love, which peaked at number 3 in the Regional Mexican Airplay chart. "Gracias a Dios" by Violento peaked at No. 4 in the Latin Songs chart and at No. 2 in the Regional Mexican chart. "No Me Dejes con las Ganas" by Los Horóscopos de Durango, named their departure from the duranguense style and their incursion to banda, became a top ten single for the band. Fidel Rueda performs "Me Encantaría", a song that became a number-two hit on the Latin Charts in the United States. "Increíble" by Banda MS and "No Me Digas" by El Chapo de Sinaloa also charted in the United States. The last track on the album is "Las Vacaciones del Jefe" by Alfredo Olivas, a narcocorrido about not killing people lately and taking a vacation, which was written by Olivas.

== Reception and commercial performance ==
Professional ratings
Review scores
Source	Rating
Allmusic	3.5/5 stars

The week of its release, Puros Trankazos debuted at No. 2 on the Billboard Top Latin Albums chart, behind Prince Royce's debut album. Four weeks later, Puros Trankazos reached the top of the chart, where it spent three non-consecutive weeks.

On the Regional Mexican Albums chart, it was at the top during seven consecutive weeks. The sales of the album were aided by success of the single "Olvídame" by Julión Álvarez y su Norteño Banda, a banda waltz ranchera, that became a No. 1 hit in the Regional Mexican Songs chart and reached No. 3 in the Latin Songs chart.

=== Charts ===
==== Weekly charts ====
Chart (2011)	Peak position
U.S. Billboard 200	118
U.S. Latin Albums (Billboard)	1
U.S. Regional Mexican Albums (Billboard)	1

==== Year-end charts ====
Chart (2011)	Position
US Latin Albums (Billboard)	25
US Regional Mexican Albums (Billboard)	10

== Track listing ==
This track listing adapted from the album liner notes.

Standard
No.	Title	Writer(s)	Performer(s)	Length
1.	"Olvídame"	Carlos Guadalupe Durán	Julión Álvarez y su Norteño Banda	4:03
2.	"La Hummer y el Camaro"	Daniel Niebla	Voz de Mando	3:31
3.	"Como la Gelatina"	Espinoza Paz	Vagón Chicano	2:44
4.	"Aunque Sea en Silencio (Cuatro Paredes)"	Ernesto Barajas	Enigma Norteño	3:14
5.	"El Ardido"	Geovani Cabrera Inzunza	Larry Hernández	2:45
6.	"No Me Dejes Con Las Ganas"	Horacio Palencia	Los Horóscopos de Durango	3:38
7.	"Dónde Estás Presumida"	Espinoza Paz	Chuy Lizarraga y su Banda Tierra Sinaloense	3:34
8.	"Gracias a Dios"	Jesús González	Violento	2:50
9.	"Increíble"	Gerardo Ortíz	Banda MS	2:48
10.	"No Me Digas"	Ariel Barreras	El Chapo de Sinaloa	2:28
11.	"Me Encantaría"	Benny Camacho	Fidel Rueda	3:07
12.	"Las Vacaciones del Jefe"	Alfredo Olivas	Alfredo Olivas	3:28

== See also ==
- 2011 in Latin music
- List of number-one Billboard Latin Albums from the 2010s
