= List of number-one singles of 2015 (Spain) =

This lists the singles that reached number one on the Spanish Promusicae sales and airplay charts in 2015. Total sales correspond to the data sent by regular contributors to sales volumes and by digital distributors. Beginning in January 2015, the methodology for Top 100 songs were changed to be based on streaming and both download and physical sales.

== Chart history ==
Week	Issue date	Top streaming, downloads & physical sales			Most airplay		
Week	Issue date	Artist(s)	Song	Ref.	Artist(s)	Song	Ref.
1	January 4	David Guetta featuring Sam Martin	"Dangerous"		Melendi	"Tocado y hundido"	
2	January 11	David Guetta featuring Sam Martin	"Dangerous"		Sam Smith	"Stay with Me"	
3	January 18	David Guetta featuring Sam Martin	"Dangerous"		David Guetta featuring Sam Martin	"Dangerous"	
4	January 25	Mark Ronson featuring Bruno Mars	"Uptown Funk"		Melendi	"Tocado y hundido"	
5	February 1	Mark Ronson featuring Bruno Mars	"Uptown Funk"		David Guetta featuring Sam Martin	"Dangerous"	
6	February 8	Mark Ronson featuring Bruno Mars	"Uptown Funk"		Meghan Trainor	"Lips Are Movin"	
7	February 15	Mark Ronson featuring Bruno Mars	"Uptown Funk"		Meghan Trainor	"Lips Are Movin"	
8	February 22	Ellie Goulding	"Love Me like You Do"		Meghan Trainor	"Lips Are Movin"	
9	March 1	Ellie Goulding	"Love Me like You Do"		Ed Sheeran	"Thinking Out Loud"	
10	March 8	Nicky Jam & Enrique Iglesias	"El Perdón"		Ed Sheeran	"Thinking Out Loud"	
11	March 15	Nicky Jam & Enrique Iglesias	"El Perdón"		Ed Sheeran	"Thinking Out Loud"	
12	March 22	Nicky Jam & Enrique Iglesias	"El Perdón"		Meghan Trainor	"Lips Are Movin"	
13	March 29	Nicky Jam & Enrique Iglesias	"El Perdón"		Meghan Trainor	"Lips Are Movin"	
14	April 5	Nicky Jam & Enrique Iglesias	"El Perdón"		Ellie Goulding	"Love Me like You Do"	
15	April 12	Nicky Jam & Enrique Iglesias	"El Perdón"		Ellie Goulding	"Love Me like You Do"	
16	April 19	Nicky Jam & Enrique Iglesias	"El Perdón"		Ellie Goulding	"Love Me like You Do"	
17	April 26	Nicky Jam & Enrique Iglesias	"El Perdón"		Alejandro Sanz	"Un Zombie a la Intemperie"	
18	May 3	Nicky Jam & Enrique Iglesias	"El Perdón"		Melendi	"La promesa"	
19	May 10	Nicky Jam & Enrique Iglesias	"El Perdón"		Paulina Rubio featuring Morat	"Mi Nuevo Vicio"	
20	May 17	Nicky Jam & Enrique Iglesias	"El Perdón"		Alejandro Sanz	"Un Zombie a la Intemperie"	
21	May 24	Nicky Jam & Enrique Iglesias	"El Perdón"		Major Lazer featuring DJ Snake and MØ	"Lean On"	
22	May 31	Nicky Jam & Enrique Iglesias	"El Perdón"		Lost Frequencies	"Are You with Me"	
23	June 7	Nicky Jam & Enrique Iglesias	"El Perdón"		Lost Frequencies	"Are You with Me"	
24	June 14	Nicky Jam & Enrique Iglesias	"El Perdón"		Lost Frequencies	"Are You with Me"	
25	June 21	Nicky Jam & Enrique Iglesias	"El Perdón"		Lost Frequencies	"Are You with Me"	
26	June 28	Nicky Jam & Enrique Iglesias	"El Perdón"		Lost Frequencies	"Are You with Me"	
27	July 5	Nicky Jam & Enrique Iglesias	"El Perdón"		Major Lazer featuring DJ Snake & MØ	"Lean On"	
28	July 9	Gente de Zona featuring Marc Anthony	"La Gozadera"		Major Lazer featuring DJ Snake & MØ	"Lean On"	
29	July 16	Gente de Zona featuring Marc Anthony	"La Gozadera"		Lost Frequencies]	"Are You with Me"	
30	July 23	Gente de Zona featuring Marc Anthony	"La Gozadera"		Efecto Pasillo	"Cuando me siento bien"	
31	July 30	Gente de Zona featuring Marc Anthony	"La Gozadera"		Lost Frequencies	"Are You with Me"	
32	August 6	Gente de Zona featuring Marc Anthony	"La Gozadera"		Lost Frequencies	"Are You with Me"	
33	August 13	Gente de Zona featuring Marc Anthony	"La Gozadera"		Estopa	"Pastillas para dormir"	
34	August 20	Gente de Zona featuring Marc Anthony	"La Gozadera"		Estopa	"Pastillas para dormir"	
35	August 27	Gente de Zona featuring Marc Anthony	"La Gozadera"		Estopa	"Pastillas para dormir"	
36	September 3	Gente de Zona featuring Marc Anthony	"La Gozadera"		Madcon featuring Ray Dalton	"Don't Worry"	
37	September 10	Gente de Zona featuring Marc Anthony	"La Gozadera"		Madcon featuring Ray Dalton	"Don't Worry"	
38	September 17	Gente de Zona featuring Marc Anthony	"La Gozadera"		Kygo featuring Parson James	"Stole the Show"	
39	September 24	J Balvin	"Ginza"		Kygo featuring Parson James	"Stole the Show"	
40	October 1	J Balvin	"Ginza"		Kygo featuring Parson James	"Stole the Show"	
41	October 8	Cali y El Dandee	"Por fin te encontré"		Kygo featuring Parson James	"Stole the Show"	
42	October 15	Cali y El Dandee	"Por fin te encontré"		Kygo featuring Parson James	"Stole the Show"	
43	October 22	Cali y El Dandee	"Por fin te encontré"		Felix Jaehn featuring Jasmine Thompson	"Ain't Nobody (Loves Me Better)"	
44	October 29	Adele	"Hello"		Álvaro Soler featuring Jennifer Lopez	"El mismo sol"	
45	November 5	Adele	"Hello"		Kygo featuring Parson James	"Stole the Show"	
46	November 12	Adele	"Hello"		Felix Jaehn featuring Jasmine Thompson	"Ain’t Nobody (Loves Me Better)"	
47	November 19	Justin Bieber	"Sorry"		Felix Jaehn featuring Jasmine Thompson	"Ain’t Nobody (Loves Me Better)"	
48	November 26	Justin Bieber	"Sorry"		Felix Jaehn featuring Jasmine Thompson	"Ain’t Nobody (Loves Me Better)"	
49	December 3	Justin Bieber	"Sorry"		Adele	"Hello"	
50	December 10	Justin Bieber	"Sorry"		Adele	"Hello"	
51	December 17	Justin Bieber	"Sorry"		Adele	"Hello"	
52	December 24	Justin Bieber	"Sorry"		Pablo López featuring Juanes	"Tu enemigo"	
53	December 31	Justin Bieber	"Sorry"		Pablo López featuring Juanes	"Tu enemigo"	
