= La Gozadera =

2015 single by Gente de Zona

Single by Gente de Zona featuring Marc Anthony

from the album Visualízate
- Released: April 30, 2015
- Genre: Latin pop
- Length: 3:23
- Label: Sony Music Entertainment US Latin
- Songwriters: Alexander Delgado Hernández, Randy Malcolm, Arbise González
- Producer: Motiff

Gente de Zona singles chronology
"Piensas (Dile la Verdad)" (2014)	"La Gozadera" (2015)	"Traidora" (2015)

Marc Anthony singles chronology
"Yo También" (2014)	"La Gozadera" (2015)	"Traidora" (2015)

Music video
- "La Gozadera" on YouTube

"La Gozadera" (Spanish term meaning a "good time" or "party") is a song by Cuban duo Gente de Zona as the lead single for their third studio album Visualízate. Featuring American singer Marc Anthony, it was released on April 30, 2015, by Sony Music Latin. The music video for the song was nominated in the Videoclip Awards 2016, The music video was directed by Alejandro Pérez and filmed in Cuba while the scenes with Marc Anthony were filmed in the Dominican Republic. The song was produced by Motiff, a salsa version was also recorded which was produced by Sergio George. As of May 2025, the video has received over 1.6 billion views on YouTube.

The official remix features American rapper Pitbull.

“La Gozadera” was revealed as the official song of the 2021 Copa América tournament, with the song itself being a customized version featuring Copa América-related lyrics.

== Charts ==
=== Weekly charts ===
Chart (2015–16)	Peak position
Belgium (Ultratip Bubbling Under Flanders)	55
Belgium (Ultratip Bubbling Under Wallonia)	47
France (SNEP)	124
Italy (FIMI)	92
Netherlands (Dutch Tipparade 40)	3
Netherlands (Single Tip)	4
Portugal (AFP)	46
Romania (Romanian Top 100)	8
Spain (Promusicae)	1
Switzerland (Schweizer Hitparade)	34
US Hot Latin Songs (Billboard)	2
US Latin Pop Airplay (Billboard)	3
US Latin Airplay (Billboard)	1
US Latin Rhythm Airplay (Billboard)	1
US Tropical Airplay (Billboard)	1

=== Year-end charts ===
Chart (2015)	Position
Spain (PROMUSICAE)	4
US Hot Latin Songs (Billboard)	7

Chart (2016)	Position
Spain (PROMUSICAE)	44

== Certifications ==
Region	Certification	Certified units/sales
Italy (FIMI)	Platinum	50,000^{‡}
Mexico (AMPROFON)	Diamond+2× Platinum+Gold	450,000^{‡}
Poland (ZPAV)	Gold	25,000^{‡}
Spain (Promusicae)	6× Platinum	360,000^{‡}
United States (RIAA)	12× Platinum (Latin)	720,000^{‡}
^{‡} Sales+streaming figures based on certification alone.

== Awards and nominations ==
Year	Ceremony	Award	Result
2015	Latin American Music Awards	Favorite Tropical Song	Won
2016	Lo Nuestro Awards	Video of the Year	Nominated

== In other media ==
"La Gozadera" was featured in a 2017 Chilean animated film Condorito: La Película.

In 2021, in conjunction with that year's Copa América, the remix version, which was the official song of the event, was released. This version has some changes from the original lyrics, with the goal of mentioning only the countries participating in the competition.

== See also ==
- List of number-one singles of 2015 (Spain)
- List of Billboard number-one Latin songs of 2015
