= Traidora =

Single by Gente de Zona featuring Marc Anthony

from the album Visualízate
- Released: November 13, 2015
- Genre: Reggaeton, salsa
- Length: 3:36
- Label: Sony Music Entertainment US Latin
- Songwriter: Alexander Delgado Arbise "Motiff" Gonzalez Randy Malcom Marco Antonio Muñiz Leonardo Torres
- Producer: Motiff

Gente de Zona singles chronology
"La Gozadera" (2015)	"Traidora" (2015)	"Mas Macarena" (2016)

Marc Anthony singles chronology
"La Gozadera" (2015)	"Traidora" (2015)	"Deja Que Te Besé" (2016)

Music video
- "Traidora" on YouTube

"Traidora" (feminine of Traidor transl. "Traitor") is a song by Cuban duo Gente de Zona featuring American singer Marc Anthony. The music video of the song was directed by Alejandro Pérez and was filmed in Miami, Florida. As of January 2018, the video has received over 320 million views on YouTube.

== Charts ==
=== Weekly charts ===
Chart (2016)	Peak position
Spain (Promusicae)	8
US Hot Latin Songs (Billboard)	6
US Latin Airplay (Billboard)	2
US Latin Pop Airplay (Billboard)	1
US Tropical Airplay (Billboard)	1

=== Year-end charts ===
Chart (2016)	Position
Spain (PROMUSICAE)	30
US Hot Latin Songs (Billboard)	21

== Certifications ==
Region	Certification	Certified units/sales
Mexico (AMPROFON)	Gold	30,000^{‡}
Spain (Promusicae)	2× Platinum	80,000^{‡}
^{‡} Sales+streaming figures based on certification alone.

== Awards and nominations ==
Year	Ceremony	Award	Result
2016	Latin American Music Awards	Favorite Tropical Song	Nominated
2017	Billboard Latin Music Awards	Tropical Song of the Year	Nominated
2017	Lo Nuestro Award	Collaboration of the Year	Nominated
2017	Lo Nuestro Award	Tropical Song	Nominated
