= Pancho Barraza =

Mexican singer-songwriter

- Born: Francisco Javier Barraza Rodríguez; 17 June 1961 (age 65); Sinaloa, Mexico
- Origin: Sinaloa, Mexico
- Genres: Banda; mariachi
- Occupations: Singer; songwriter; musician
- Instruments: Vocals; Bass
- Years active: 1989–present
- Labels: Fonovisa Records; RB Music; Discos Musart; Balboa Records

Francisco Javier Barraza Rodríguez, better known as Pancho Barraza, (born 17 June 1961) is a Mexican singer-songwriter.

== Early life ==
Barraza was born and raised in Sinaloa. His parents separated when he was nine months old, and he was raised by his grandparents. He cited his love of singing to come from his grandmother, who would often sing around him, helping to develop his own singing voice. He would later write the song Adiós papá in tribute to his grandparents.

This love of music would continue throughout the rest of Barraza's childhood where he would perform in bands and enter competitions. After graduating High School, he would earn a degree in music education, teaching in Villa Unión, Sinaloa. He would perform in local bands and a pop group before being approached by Banda Los Recoditos in 1989. Unaware of their music at the time, he would decline their offer. Before listening to their music and accepting a follow up offer the same year.

== Career ==
Barraza found success with Banda Los Recoditos in the Banda genre, contributing as lead vocalist, bassist and song writer on six albums, with airplay in both Mexico and the United States. He found that his song writing began to diverge from traditional banda styles, falling into more romantic styles, a trend that continued into his solo career, after he left the band in 1994.

Barraza would release his solo debut the following year with Mis Canciones de Amor. He would continue to develop new genres for his music, releasing Mariachi and Ranchera inspired albums, as well as Latino Pop, releasing multiple albums over the following years.

Issues with substance abuse, limited Barraza's career for a decade, until he was invited to receive an award in 2015, where he met the head of RB Music. Who after discovering that he didn't have a record label at the time, helped him release El Poeta Del Amor - Mas Fuerte Que Nunca. Over the following years, he would continue to release music, before signing with Fonovisa Records in 2024.

== Personal life ==
Barraza was involved in a car accident in May 2023 in Sinaloa, after a collision with two trucks, although he escaped unharmed, citing a need for more caution on the road.

He has three sons Julio, Adrian and Javier who are also singers.

== See also ==
- El Coyote (singer)
- Julio Preciado
- Valentín Elizalde
