= Visualízate =

Studio album by Gente de Zona
- Released: April 22, 2016
- Genre: Latin
- Length: 47:04
- Label: Sony Music Latin; Magnus Media LLC

Gente de Zona chronology
Oro: Lo Nuevo y Lo Mejor (2012)	Visualízate (2016)	En Letra de Otro (2018)

Singles from Visualízate
- 1. "Yo Quiero (Si Tu Te Enamoras)" Released: November 20, 2014; 2. "La Gozadera" Released: April 30, 2015; 3. "Traidora" Released: November 13, 2015

Visualízate (Spanish for "Visualize Yourself", imperative of reflexive verb "visualizarse") is the third studio album by Cuban reggaeton group Gente de Zona. It was released on April 22, 2016, by Sony Music Latin and Magnus Media LLC. The album features guest appearances from Marc Anthony, Pitbull, Motiff, A&M, Los Cadillacs and Chino y Nacho. The album was supported by two singles: "La Gozadera" and "Traidora". Visualízate has won a Latin Grammy for Best Tropical Fusion Album and was awarded Favorite Tropical Album during the Latin American Music Awards of 2016.

== Track listing ==
No.	Title	Length
1.	"La Gozadera" (featuring Marc Anthony)	3:23
2.	"Algo Contigo"	3:30
3.	"Piensas (Dile la Verdad)" (performed by Pitbull featuring Gente de Zona (from Pitbull's album Dale))	3:46
4.	"Por Ti"	3:29
5.	"La Tentación"	3:17
6.	"Que Tú Quieres"	3:39
7.	"Más Whisky" (featuring Motiff and A&M)	3:29
8.	"Tú Me Quemas" (performed by Chino y Nacho featuring Gente de Zona and Los Cadillacs)	4:28
9.	"Yo Quiero (Si Tu Te Enamoras)" (featuring Pitbull)	3:27
10.	"Traidora" (featuring Marc Anthony)	3:36
11.	"Tu y Yo"	3:38
12.	"La Gozadera" (Salsa Version) (featuring Marc Anthony)	3:23
13.	"Traidora" (Salsa Version) (featuring Marc Anthony)	3:59
Total length:		47:04

== Charts ==
=== Weekly charts ===
Chart (2016)	Peak position
Spanish Albums (PROMUSICAE)	42
US Top Latin Albums (Billboard)	1
US Tropical Albums (Billboard)	1

=== Year-end charts ===
Chart (2016)	Position
US Top Latin Albums (Billboard)	16
US Tropical Albums (Billboard)	1
Chart (2017)	Position
US Top Latin Albums (Billboard)	26
Chart (2018)	Position
US Top Latin Albums (Billboard)	51

== Certifications ==
Region	Certification	Certified units/sales
Chile (IFPI CHI)	Platinum	
Mexico (AMPROFON)	Gold	30,000^{‡}
United States (RIAA)	2× Platinum (Latin)	120,000^{‡}
^{‡} Sales+streaming figures based on certification alone.

== Awards and nominations ==
Year	Award	Category	Work	Result	Ref.
2016	The Latin AMAs	Favorite Album – Tropical	Visualízate	Won	
2016	Latin Grammys	Best Tropical Fusion Album	Visualízate	Won	
2017	Premio Lo Nuestro	Album of the Year	Visualízate	Won	
2017	Premio Lo Nuestro	Tropical Album of the Year	Visualízate	Won	
