= Tú Me Quemas =

Single by Chino & Nacho featuring Gente de Zona and Los Cadillac's

from the album Radio Universo, Visualízate
- Released: July 15, 2014
- Genre: Tropical fusion, merengue
- Length: 4:30
- Label: Machete Music

Chino & Nacho singles chronology
"Chica Ideal" (2013)	"Tú Me Quemas" (2014)	"Me Voy Enamorando" (2015)

Gente de Zona singles chronology
"Bailando" (2014)	"Tú Me Quemas" (2014)	"Yo Quiero" (2014)

Los Cadillac's singles chronology
"Candela" (2013)	"Tú Me Quemas" (2014)	"Me Marcharé" (2015)

Tú Me Quemas (English: You Burn Me) is a song performed by Venezuelan duo Chino & Nacho featuring the Cuban group Gente de Zona and Venezuelan duo Los Cadillac's, released as the second single from his upcoming live album by Machete Music on July 17, 2014.

== Track listing ==
1. "Tu Me Quemas" (feat. Gente de Zona & Los Cadillac's) - 4:30

== Charts ==
Chart (2014)	Peak position
Colombia (National-Report)	6
US Hot Latin Songs (Billboard)	23
US Latin Airplay (Billboard)	6
US Latin Pop Airplay (Billboard)	5
US Tropical Airplay (Billboard)	1
Venezuela (Record Report)	1

=== Year-end charts ===
Chart (2014)	Position
US Latin Songs	51
US Latin Pop Songs	22
US Latin Tropical Airplay	20
