= Latin American Music Awards =

American music award show

- Current: Latin American Music Awards of 2024
- Awarded for: Outstanding achievements for artists in the Latin music industry
- Country: United States
- First award: 2015

Highlights
- Most awards: Karol G (23)
- Most nominations: J Balvin (24)
- Website: Official website

Television/radio coverage
- Network: Telemundo (2015–2022); Univision (2023-present)

The Latin American Music Awards (Latin AMAs) is an annual American music awards show produced by TelevisaUnivision. It is the Spanish-language counterpart of the American Music Awards (AMAs). As with AMAs, the Latin AMAs are determined by a poll of the public and music buyers and are produced by SOMOS Productions. The first Latin AMAs debuted on October 8, 2015, on Telemundo and were hosted by Lucero. The awards were not held in 2020 as a result of the COVID-19 pandemic, they resumed a year later.

The broadcast was moved from Telemundo to Univision in 2023.

== Ceremonies ==
| # | Year | Host | Venue | City |
|---|---|---|---|---|
| 01 | October 8, 2015 | Lucero | Dolby Theatre | Los Angeles |
| 02 | October 6, 2016 | Lucero | Dolby Theatre | Los Angeles |
| 03 | October 26, 2017 | Diego Boneta and Becky G | Dolby Theatre | Los Angeles |
| 04 | October 25, 2018 | Becky G, Gloria Trevi, Leslie Grace, Roselyn Sanchez and Aracely Arambula | Dolby Theatre | Los Angeles |
| 05 | October 17, 2019 | Eugenio Derbez and Jaqueline Bracamontes | Dolby Theatre | Los Angeles |
| 06 | April 15, 2021 | Jacqueline Bracamontes | BB&T Center | Sunrise, Florida |
| 07 | April 21, 2022 | Cristián de la Fuente, Jacqueline Bracamontes and Rafael Amaya | Michelob Ultra Arena | Las Vegas |
| 08 | April 20, 2023 | Julian Gil, Galilea Montijo, Clarissa Molina and Natti Natasha | MGM Grand Garden Arena | Las Vegas |
| 09 | April 25, 2024 | Thalía, Alejandra Espinoza, Becky G, and Carlos Ponce | MGM Grand Garden Arena | Las Vegas |

== Categories ==
=== Current awards ===
- Artist of the Year
- Album of the Year
- Song of the Year
- New Artist of the Year
- Favorite Duo or Group (2018–present)
- Streaming Artist of the Year (2021–present)
- Favorite Pop Artist (2018, 2021–present)
- Favorite Pop Album (2018, 2021–present)
- Favorite Pop Song (2018, 2021–present)
- Best Collaboration - Pop/Urban (2023–present)
- Favorite Urban Artist (2016–present)
- Favorite Urban Album (2015-2016, 2018–present)
- Favorite Urban Song
- Favorite Regional Mexican Artist (2016-)
- Favorite Regional Mexican Duo or Group (2015-2017, 2021–present)
- Favorite Regional Mexican Album (2016–present)
- Favorite Regional Mexican Song
- Best Collaboration - Regional Mexican (2023–present)
- Favorite Tropical Artist
- Favorite Tropical Album
- Favorite Tropical Song
- Best Collaboration - Tropical (2023–present)
- Favorite Crossover Artist
- Collaboration Crossover of the Year (2023–present)
- Collaboration of the Year (2015-2017, 2021–present)
- Tour of the Year (2018-2019, 2022–present)

=== Discontinued awards ===
- Favorite Male Artist (2018-2022)
- Favorite Female Artist (2015, 2018–2022)
- Social Artist of the Year (2021-2022)
- Favorite Pop/Rock Artist (2019)
- Favorite Pop/Rock New Artist (2015-2016)
- Favorite Pop/Rock Male Artist (2015-2017)
- Favorite Pop/Rock Female Artist (2016-2017)
- Favorite Pop/Rock Duo or Group (2015-2017)
- Favorite Pop/Rock Album (2016-2017, 2019)
- Favorite Pop/Rock Song (2015-2017, 2019)
- Favorite Regional Mexican New Artist (2016)
- Favorite Regional Mexican Male Artist (2015)
- Favorite Urban New Artist (2016)
- Favorite Urban Male Artist (2015)
- Favorite Urban Duo or Group (2015-2016)
- Favorite Tropical New Artist (2016)
- Favorite Dance Song (2015-2016)
- Favorite Crossover Song (2016)
- Favorite Streaming Song (2015)
- Viral Song of the Year (2022)
- Favorite Video (2018-2022)
- Favorite Virtual Concert (2021)

== Special awards ==
Dick Clark Achievement Award

- 2017: Pitbull

Extraordinary Evolution Award

- 2019: Becky G
- 2021: Ozuna
- 2022: Christian Nodal

Legacy Award

- 2023: Carlos Vives

Legend Award (Note: The honor is presented to artists who have endured the test of time and who at the very mention of their name conjures a vivid and vibrant image.)

- 2021: José Luis Rodríguez 'El Puma'
- 2022: Lupita D’Alessio
- 2024: Banda MS
- 2024: Ricardo Montaner

Icon Award

- 2021: Alejandro Fernández

International Artist Award of Excellence

- 2019: Marc Anthony

Pioneer Award

- 2023: David Bisbal
- 2023: Prince Royce
- 2024: Yandel

== Records ==
=== Most wins ===
The record for most Latin American Music Awards won is held by Karol G with 23 awards. The record for most Latin American Music Awards won by a male artist belongs to Bad Bunny, with 15 awards. The record for most wins for a group belongs to CNCO, who have collected 13 awards.

| Rank | Artist | Number of awards |
|---|---|---|
| 1 | Karol G | 23 |
| 2 | Bad Bunny | 15 |
| 3 | Enrique Iglesias | 14 |
| 4 | CNCO | 13 |
| 5 | Christian Nodal | 11 |
| 6 | Romeo Santos | 10 |
| 7 | Becky G | 9 |
| 7 | Prince Royce | 9 |
| 7 | Shakira | 9 |
| 8 | Ozuna | 8 |
| 9 | Anuel AA | 6 |
| 9 | Feid | 6 |
| 9 | Selena Gomez | 6 |
| 10 | Banda MS | 5 |
| 10 | J Balvin | 5 |
| 10 | Sebastian Yatra | 5 |

=== Most wins in a single ceremony ===
The record for the most Latin American Music Awards won in a single year is held by Karol G (in 2022, 2023 and 2024) and Feid (in 2024). Enrique Iglesias (in 2015 and 2016), Anuel AA (in 2019), and Bad Bunny (in 2021 and 2022) follow with 5 awards won in a single year.

- Karol G: 8 (2023)
- Karol G: 6 (2022)
- Karol G: 6 (2024)
- Feid: 6 (2024)

=== Most nominations ===
J Balvin is the most nominated act overall of the award show with 44 nominees, followed by Bad Bunny with 41. The most nominated female act is Karol G with 28, followed by Shakira with both 25 nominees. Banda MS is the most nominated group of the show, with 33 nominees, followed by Calibre 50 with 15 mentions.

| Nominations | Act |
|---|---|
| 44 | J Balvin |
| 41 | Bad Bunny |
| 36 | Karol G |
| 33 | Banda Sinaloense MS de Sergio Lizárraga |
| 32 | Daddy Yankee |
| 32 | Ozuna |
| 28 | Maluma |
| 26 | Romeo Santos |
| 25 | Shakira |
| 23 | Nicky Jam |
| 22 | Enrique Iglesias |
| 20 | Christian Nodal |
| 20 | Wisin |
| 18 | Camilo |
| 18 | Farruko |
| 17 | Becky G |
| 16 | Luis Fonsi |
| 16 | Rauw Alejandro |
| 16 | Sebastián Yatra |
| 15 | Calibre 50 |

== See also ==
- American Music Awards
- American Music Award for Favorite Latin Artist
