= Me Voy Enamorando =

"Me voy Enamorando"

Single by Chino & Nacho

from the album Radio Universo
- Released: March 10, 2015
- Genre: Reggaeton; Latin music
- Length: 3:55 (original) 3:35 (remix)
- Label: Machete Music
- Songwriters: Miguel Ignacio Mendoza Donatti, Gilberto Marin, Jesus Alberto Miranda Perez, Arbise de Jesus Gonzalez, Servando Primera
- Producers: Motiff, Tainy

Chino & Nacho singles chronology
"Tú Me Quemas" (2015)	"Me voy Enamorando" (2015)	"Se Acabó" (2016)

"Me voy Enamorando" (English: I'm Falling in Love), is a song performed by Venezuelan duo Chino & Nacho for their studio album Radio Universo (2015). A remix featuring the vocals of Farruko was released on March 10, 2015 by Machete Music and serves as the third single from the album. A music video, directed by Nuno Gómez, was filmed for the remix version in a neighborhood in Venezuela.

In 2018, Esteban from Kids United made a cover of this song.

== Critical reception ==
In their list of the 25 best songs of 2015, Billboard writers placed "Me estoy Enamorando" at number 17, writing "[T]his song was a smash. What got to us was the mix of tropical and pop, not to mention romance and dance. The duo's tale of budding romance struck a universal chord, and bringing rapper Farruko in as a guest gave it just the right touch of edge."

== Music video ==
A music video for the song was filmed in a "low-income neighborhood" in Venezuela and directed by Nuno Gómez. The duo decided to use a neighborhood in Venezuela as the filming location in order to give a glimpse of its beauty to the viewers. Talking about the set, Nacho described it as emotional and added that "Everyone is connecting with the story". During an interview Gómez said that the video contained two months of production. He added that the team working behind it had the goal to eschew the format characteristic of the musical genre the duo performed which according to him included "performance, women and yachts". With that being said, the team searched for a concept which would make viewers connect with it.

The story of the video follows two teenagers falling in love with each other - they are a girl undergoing cancer treatment and a boy who wants to show his love and does various things such as shaving his head. Leila Cobo of Billboard magazine described the clip as "uplifting and infectious". The video was released to the group's official Vevo account on May 7, 2015. As of July 2021, it has been viewed more than 1 billion times. The video was nominated in the category for Best Video at the 2016 Heat Latin Music Awards.

== Track listing ==
1. Me Voy Enamorando (Remix) [feat. Farruko] - 3:35

== Charts ==
=== Weekly charts ===
Chart (2015)	Peak position
US Hot Latin Songs (Billboard)	18
US Latin Airplay (Billboard)	20
US Tropical Airplay (Billboard)	1

=== Year-end charts ===
Chart (2015)	Position
Spain (PROMUSICAE)	44
US Hot Latin Songs (Billboard)	39
US Latin Pop Songs (Billboard)	32
US Tropical Airplay Songs (Billboard)	12

== Certifications ==
Region	Certification	Certified units/sales
Spain (Promusicae)	2× Platinum	80,000^{‡}
^{‡} Sales+streaming figures based on certification alone.
