= Gente de Zona =

Cuban reggaeton band

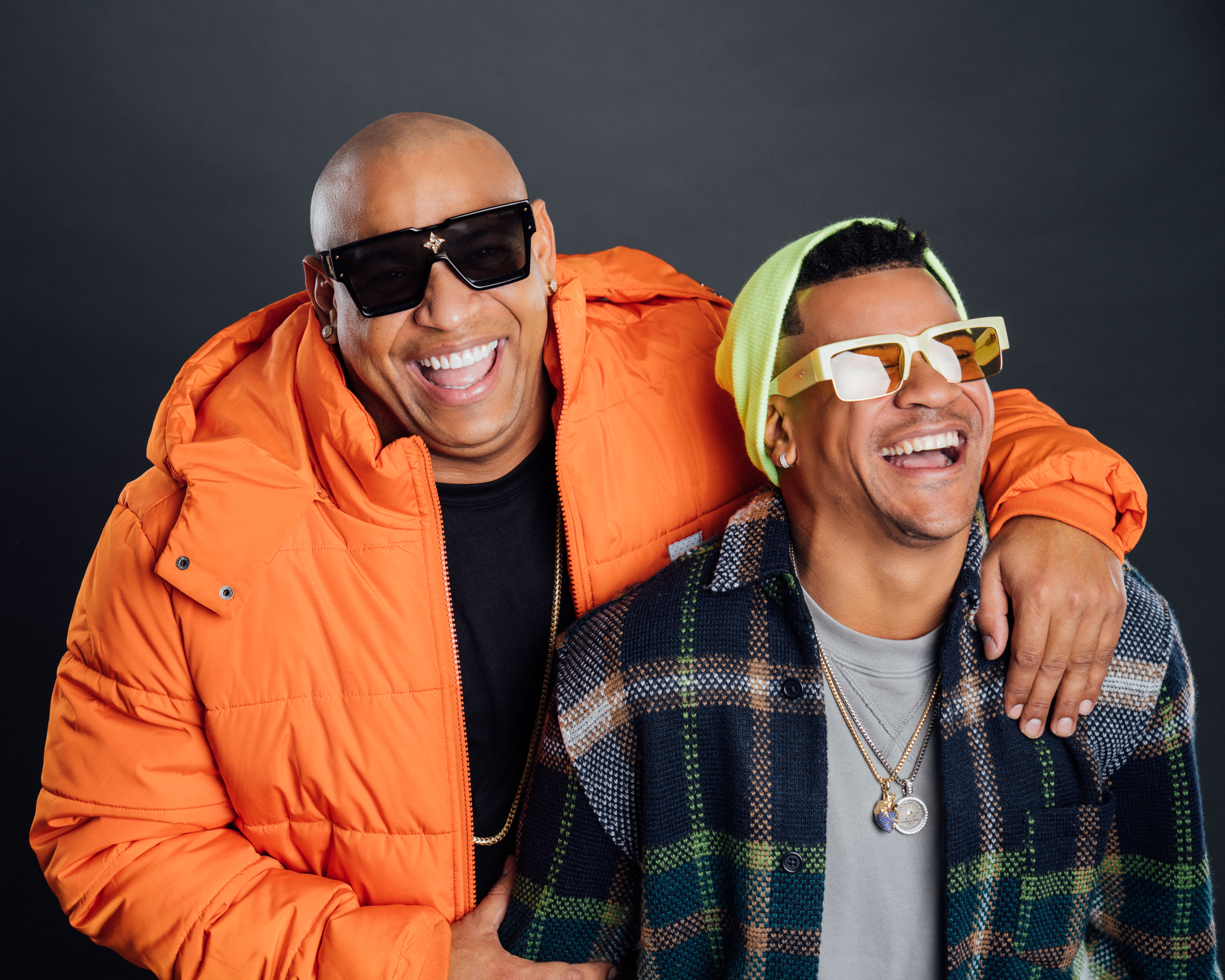
- Gente de Zona in 2022

Background information
- Genres: Reggaeton
- Years active: 2000–present
- Members: Alexander Delgado Hernández; Randy Malcom Martínez
- Past members: Michel Delgado; Jacob Forever; Nando Pro

Gente de Zona (Spanish pronunciation: [ˈxente ðe ˈsona]; lit. 'Locals') is a Cuban reggaeton duo made up of musicians Alexander Delgado and Randy Malcom Martínez. In 2014, the duo gained success with the song "Bailando" with Enrique Iglesias. This hit gave the duo numerous prestigious awards including the Latin Grammy and Latin Billboard Award. The duo was known for its Cubatón hits before succeeding on the international stage with major hits and collaborations that infused "tropical" rhythms to mainstream pop and urban music. "Bailando" became the first Spanish language song to get 1 billion views on YouTube and their song "La Gozadera" has been described by many as "Latin America's official hymn."

== Career ==
Gente de Zona was founded in 2000 in the Alamar neighborhood of Havana, consisting initially of Alexander Delgado and Michel Delgado. They initially performed at smaller events and parties in the Havana area, including Alamar, Regla and Guanabacoa. Two years later, they joined the Asociación Hermanos Saíz, a government-sponsored Cuban cultural organization, and signed with the Empresa Comercializadora de la Música y los Espectáculos Antonio María Romeu (Commercial Business of Music and Performances Antonio María Romeu), which allowed them to perform across the country. This same year, they became one of the first members of the Cuban Rap Agency, a government agency involved with promoting and commercializing rap on the island.

In 2005, Michel Delgado departed from the group, while rapper Jacob Forever (Yosdany Jacob Carmenates) and DJ and producer Nando Pro joined. The trio released the album Lo Mejor Que Suena Ahora in 2008. In March 2013, the members separated, with Jacob Forever embarking on a solo career supported by Nando Pro. Delgado continued the group under the Gente de Zona moniker after bringing on ex-Charanga Habanera singer Randy Malcom Martínez.

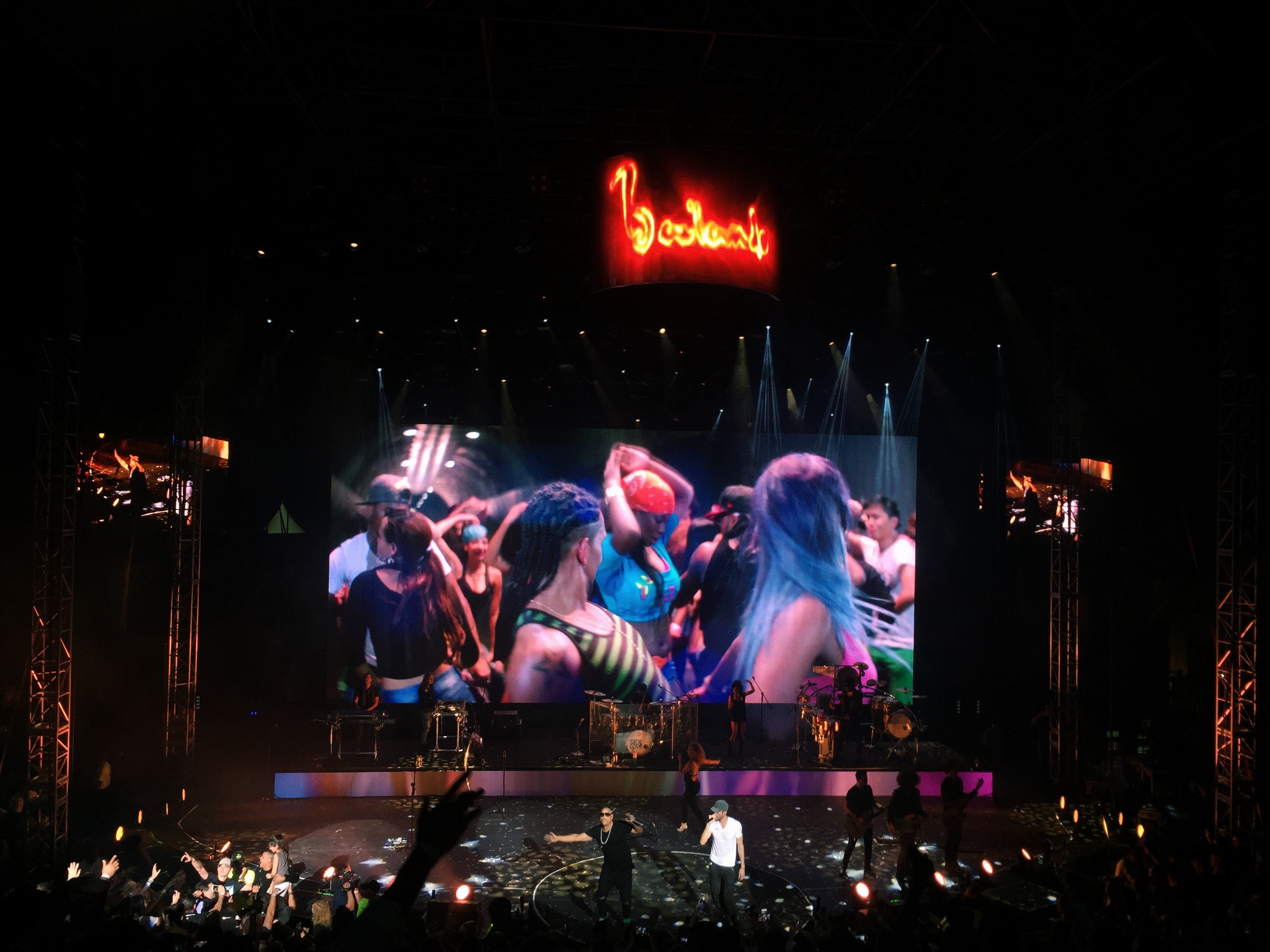
Gente de Zona performing in the Dominican Republic in 2016 with Enrique Iglesias

In their early years, the group's appeal was mostly limited to Cuba, with some fans in Europe, until the release of Enrique Iglesias's "Bailando" in 2014. Although work on the song began in 2009, it was several years before fellow Cuban musician and songwriter Descemer Bueno went to Cuba and recruited Gente de Zona to be part of the song. With newfound international recognition, the group subsequently released collaborations with Pitbull, Chino & Nacho, Marc Anthony and Juan Magán in the year that followed.

In 2019, Gente de Zona was initially announced as part of a Pitbull-organized New Year's Eve concert lineup Miami, but was later withdrawn due to concerns from the local community that the group was too close with the Cuban government. Then-Miami mayor, Cuban American Francis Suarez, criticized the choice of the group for the event, stating, "You have to understand that an artist who declares themselves in favor of communism or gives communism credibility is considered persona non grata. It's not about intolerance or censorship, it's about respect and recognizing the mortifying history of communism, especially in Cuba."

Two years later, in February 2021, Gente de Zona, with other Cuban artists Yotuel, Beatriz Luengo, Descemer Bueno, Luis Manuel Otero Alcántara, Maykel Osorbo and El Funky released "Patria y Vida" paying tribute to the San Isidro Movement and criticizing the Cuban government's repression of artistic expression in the country, shortages of essential items, and management of the country's currency. The song was Gente de Zona's first politically partisan song, with Delgado later saying, "It becomes a commitment that you have with your people, who have followed you and given you everything you have today. We never knew that your talent and a song could be the weapon to hit these people hard, this government." The song was subsequently banned in Cuba, and Gente de Zona stated that they were subsequently banned from performing concerts on the island.

== Discography ==
=== Albums ===
==== Studio albums ====
List of studio albums, with selected chart positions
Title	Album details	Certifications
Lo Mejor Que Suena Ahora	Released: February 8, 2008; Label: Planet Records Europe; Format: CD, digital download	
A Full	Released: July 19, 2010; Label: Planet Records Europe; Format: CD, digital download	
Visualízate	Released: April 22, 2016; Label: Sony Music Entertainment US Latin LLC and Magnus Media LLC; Format: CD, digital download	IFPI CHI: Platinum; AMPROFON: Gold; RIAA: 2× Platinum (Latin)
En Letra de Otro	Released: October 26, 2018; Label: Sony Music Latin, Magnus	
Otra Cosa	Released: May 24, 2019; Label: Sony Music Latin, Magnus	RIAA: Platinum (Latin)
De Menor a Mayor	Released: April 8, 2022; Label: Sony Music Latin, Magnus	
Demasiado	Released: April 18, 2024; Label: Magnus	

=== Reissued albums ===
List of reissued albums, with selected chart positions
Title	Album details
Lo Mejor Que Suena Ahora v2.0	Released: July 25, 2008; Label: Planet Records Europe, Format: CD, digital download

=== Compilation albums ===
List of compilation albums, with selected chart positions
Title	Album details
Oro: Lo Nuevo y Lo Mejor	Released: April 30, 2012; Label: Planet Records Europe; Format: CD, digital download

== Singles ==
=== As lead artist ===
List of singles, with selected chart positions, showing year released and album name
Title	Year	Peak chart positions							Certifications	Album
Title	Year	MEX	SPA	US Latin	US Latin Airplay	US Latin Tropical	US Latin Rhythm	VEN	Certifications	Album
"Le Gustan Los Artistas"	2008	—	—	—	—	—	—	—		Lo Mejor Que Suena Ahora
"Pinocho"	2013	—	—	—	—	—	—	—		Non-album single
"Yo Quiero (Si Tu Te Enamoras)" (featuring Pitbull)	2014	—	—	—	—	34	15	9		Dale and Visualízate
"Ponte Bonita"	2014	—	—	—	—	—	—	—		Non-album single
"La Gozadera" (featuring Marc Anthony)	2015	2	1	2	1	1	1	—	AMPROFON: Diamond+Platinum+Gold; PROMUSICAE: 5× Platinum; RIAA: 12× Platinum (Latin)	Visualízate
"Traidora" (featuring Marc Anthony)	2015	—	8	6	2	1	—	—	AMPROFON: Gold; PROMUSICAE: 2× Platinum	Visualízate
"Más Macarena" (featuring Los Del Río)	2016	—	33	—	—	23	—	13		Los Del Río: Tropical
"Cuando Calienta el Sol"	2017	—	—	—	—	—	—	—		En Letra de Otro
"Si No Vuelves"	2017	—	8	35	33	3	14	—		Otra Cosa
"Te Duele"	2017	—	—	—	—	6	—	—		Otra Cosa
"Solterita De Oro" (with Lerica and Leslie Shaw)	2019	—	—	—	—	—	—	—		Non-album single
"Muchacha" (with Becky G)	2020	—	82	— (Note: "Muchacha" did not chart on the Billboard Hot Latin Songs, though did peak at number 22 on the Latin Pop Airplay chart.)	—	5	22	—	RIAA: Platinum (Latin)	De Menor a Mayor
"La Noche Pinta Buena" (with Pacific Broders and Carlos Vives)	2020	—	—	—	—	—	—	—		Non-album single
"Otra Botella" (with Gerardo Ortíz)	2020	—	—	—	—	—	—	—		De Menor a Mayor
"Loco Por Bailar Contigo" (with El Chulo)	2020	—	—	—	—	—	—	—		Non-album singles
"Patria y Vida" (with Yotuel, Descemer Bueno, Maykel Osorbo and El Funky)	2021	—	—	—	—	—	—	—	RIAA: Platinum (Latin)	Non-album singles
"Tuki Tuki" (with Pucho y Tucutu, Motiff featuring Tony Succar)	2021	—	—	—	—	—	—	—		Non-album singles
"Se Vuelve Loca" (with Deorro)	2021	—	—	—	—	—	—	—		Non-album singles
"Háblame De Miami" (with Maffio)	2021	—	—	—	—	—	—	—		De Menor A Mayor
"Que Locura" (with Ovi)	2021	—	—	—	—	—	—	—		Non-album singles
"Tulum" (with Nia and JC El Diamante)	2022	—	—	—	—	—	—	—		Non-album singles
"Q’lona"	2022	—	—	—	—	—	—	—		De Menor A Mayor
"Hice Bien Quererte" (with Kassav)	2022	—	—	—	—	—	—	—		Non-album single
"El Negrito" (with Carlos Vives)	2022	—	—	—	—	—	—	—		De Menor A Mayor
"—" denotes a title that was not released or did not chart in that territory.

=== As featured artist ===
List of singles, with selected chart positions, showing year released and album name
Title	Year	Peak chart positions								Certifications	Album
Title	Year	COL	MEX	SPA	US	US LATIN	US LATIN RHYTHM	US TROP	VEN	Certifications	Album
"Dame Una Noche" (DJ Chino featuring Gente de Zona, Fito Blanko, and Fuego)	2014	—	—	—	—	—	—	—	—		—N/a
"Bailando" (Enrique Iglesias featuring Gente de Zona and Descemer Bueno or featuring Sean Paul, Gente de Zona, and Descemer Bueno)	2014	1	1	1	12	1	—	1	17	AMPROFON: 2× Platinum; FIMI: 7× Platinum; IFPI SWI: Gold; PROMUSICAE: 5× Platinum	Sex and Love
"Tu Me Quemas" (Chino & Nacho featuring Gente de Zona and Los Cadillacs)	2014	6	—	—	—	27	6	1	1		Radio Universo and Visualízate
"Piensas (Dile la Verdad)" (Pitbull featuring Gente de Zona)	2015	—	—	22	—	11	1	8	—	PROMUSICAE: Gold	Dale and Visualízate
"He Llorado (Como Un Niño)" (Juan Magan featuring Gente de Zona)	2015	—	26	12	—	—	23	33	—	PROMUSICAE: Platinum	The King Is Back (#LatinIBIZAte)
"Lo Que Dios Quiera" (Fanny Lu featuring Gente de Zona)	2015	—	—	—	—	—	—	—	—		—N/a
"Arena y Sol" (Anahí featuring Gente de Zona)	2016	—	—	—	—	—	—	—	—		Inesperado and The Fate of the Furious
"La Mala y La Buena" (Alex Sensation featuring Gente de Zona)	2016	—	—	—	—	—	—	—	—		TBA
"Ni Tú Ni Yo" (Jennifer Lopez featuring Gente de Zona)	2017	—	—	12	—	15	—	2	—		TBA
"Lo Digo" (Carlos Rivera featuring Gente de Zona)	2017	27	30	—	—	—	—	—	—		Yo Creo
"3 A.M." (Jesse & Joy featuring Gente de Zona)	2017	55	2	—	—	22	—	2	—		Un Besito Más
"Baddek Enayah" (Mohammed Assaf featuring Gente De Zona)	2017	—	—	—	—	—	—	—	—		Ma Wahashnak
"Quédate Conmigo" (Chyno Miranda featuring Wisin and Gente de Zona)	2017	—	—	—	—	25	—	2	—		Quédate Conmigo
"La Vida Me Cambió" (Diana Fuentes featuring Gente De Zona)	2017	—	—	—	—	—	—	10	—		TBA
"Stop Me from Falling" (Kylie Minogue featuring Gente de Zona)	2018	—	—	—	—	—	—	—	—		Golden
"Lento" (Thalía featuring Gente de Zona)	2018	—	12	88	—	—	—	4	—		Valiente
"Nadie Como Yo" (Malu Trevejo featuring Gente de Zona)	2019	—	—	—	—	—	—	—	—		TBA
"Tulum" (NIA featuring Gente de Zona and JC El Diamante)	2022	—	—	—	—	—	—	—	—		—N/a
"—" denotes a title that was not released or did not chart in that territory.

== Awards and nominations ==
Year	Award	Category	Work	Result	Ref.
2015	Latin American Music Awards	Favorite Urban Duo or Group	Gente de Zona	Won	
2015	Latin American Music Awards	Favorite Tropical Song	"La Gozadera"	Won	
2016	Premios Juventud	La Combinación Perfecta	"La Gozadera"	Won	
2016	Premios Juventud	Mi Artista Tropical	Gente de Zona	Nominated	
2016	Latin American Music Awards	Favorite Artist – Tropical	Gente de Zona	Nominated	
2016	Latin American Music Awards	Favorite Album – Tropical	"Visualízate"	Won	
2016	Latin American Music Awards	Favorite Song – Tropical	"Traidora"	Nominated	
2016	Latin Grammys	Best Tropical Fusion Album	"Visualízate"	Won	
2017	Premio Lo Nuestro	Grupo o Dúo del Año / Group Or Duo Of The Year	Gente de Zona	Won	
2017	Premio Lo Nuestro	Album Tropical del Año / Tropical Album Of The Year	"Visualizate"	Won	
2017	Premio Lo Nuestro	Album del Año / Album Of The Year	"Visualizate"	Won	
2017	Billboard Latin Music Awards	Tropical Albums Artist Of The Year, Duo or Group		Won	
2017	Billboard Latin Music Awards	Tropical Album Of The Year	"Visualízate"	Won	
2019	Billboard Latin Music Awards	Tropical Arista, Duo or Group		Nominated	
2020	Tu Musica Urbana	Cancion Tropical Urbano	El Mentiroso	Nominated	
2020	Premios Lo Nuestro	Colaboración del Año - Tropical	El Mentiroso	Nominated	
2020	Premios Lo Nuestro	Colaboración del Año - Tropical	Tan Buena	Nominated	
2021	Premios Lo Nuestro	Pop Collaboration of the Year	Muchacha ft. Becky G	Nominated	
2021	Premios Lo Nuestro	Tropical Artist of the Year		Nominated	
2021	Billboard Latin Music Awards	Artista Tropical del Año		Nominated	
2021	Latin Grammys	Song of the Year	Patria y Vida	Won	
2021	Latin Grammys	Best Urban Song	Patria y Vida	Won	
