= Lo Nuestro Award for Regional Mexican Group or Duo of the Year =

Latin music award

Lo Nuestro Awards for Regional Mexican Group or Duo of the Year
- Current: Premio Lo Nuestro 2015
- Awarded for: Regional Mexican Group or Duo of the Year
- Country: United States
- Presented by: Univision
- First award: 1989
- Currently held by: La Arrolladora Banda El Limón de René Camacho (2015)

Highlights
- Most awards: Intocable (5)
- Most nominations: Banda el Recodo (8)
- Website: univision.com/premiolonuestro

The Lo Nuestro Award for Regional Mexican Group or Duo of the Year is an award presented annually by American network Univision. It was first awarded in 1989 and has been given annually since. The accolade was established to recognize the most talented performers of Latin music. The nominees and winners were originally selected by a voting poll conducted among program directors of Spanish-language radio stations in the United States and also based on chart performance on Billboard Latin music charts, with the results being tabulated and certified by the accounting firm Deloitte. At the present time, the winners are selected by the audience through an online survey. The trophy awarded is shaped in the form of a treble clef.

The award was first presented to Mexican band Los Bukis. American group Intocable holds the record for the most awards, winning on five occasions out of seven nominations. Mexican band La Original Banda el Limón de Salvador Lizarraga are the most nominated band without a win, with four unsuccessful nominations.

== Winners and nominees ==
Listed below are the winners of the award for each year, as well as the other nominees for the majority of the years awarded.

Key	Meaning
‡	Indicates the winner

Year	Performer	Ref
1989 (1st)	Los Bukis‡	
1989 (1st)	Bronco	
1989 (1st)	Los Tigres del Norte	
1989 (1st)	Los Yonics	
1990 (2nd)	Grupo Bronco‡	
1990 (2nd)	Los Caminantes	
1990 (2nd)	Los Tigres del Norte	
1990 (2nd)	Los Yonics	
1991 (3rd)	Los Temerarios‡	
1991 (3rd)	Grupo Bronco	
1991 (3rd)	Mazz	
1991 (3rd)	Los Tigres del Norte	
1992 (4th)	La Mafia‡	
1992 (4th)	Grupo Bronco	
1992 (4th)	Mazz	
1992 (4th)	La Sombra	
1993 (5th)	La Mafia‡	
1993 (5th)	Grupo Bronco	
1993 (5th)	Mazz	
1993 (5th)	Los Temerarios	
1994 (6th)	La Mafia‡	
1994 (6th)	Los Bukis	
1994 (6th)	Grupo Bronco	
1994 (6th)	Mazz	
1995 (7th)	Marco Antonio Solís and Los Bukis‡	
1995 (7th)	Los Fugitivos	
1995 (7th)	Los Temerarios	
1995 (7th)	Los Tigres del Norte	
1996 (8th)	La Mafia‡	
1996 (8th)	Marco Antonio Solís and Los Bukis‡	
1996 (8th)	Bronco	
1996 (8th)	Liberación	
1997 (9th)	Límite‡	
1997 (9th)	Bronco	
1997 (9th)	La Mafia	
1997 (9th)	Los Mismos	
1998 (10th)	Límite‡	
1999 (11th)	Límite‡	
1999 (11th)	Los Temerarios	
1999 (11th)	Los Tigres del Norte	
1999 (11th)	Los Tucanes de Tijuana	
2000 (12th)	Conjunto Primavera‡	
2000 (12th)	A.B. Quintanilla and Kumbia Kings	
2000 (12th)	Banda el Recodo	
2000 (12th)	Los Angeles Azules	
2001 (13th)	Los Tigres del Norte‡	
2001 (13th)	Los Ángeles de Charly	
2001 (13th)	Banda el Recodo	
2001 (13th)	Conjunto Primavera	
2002 (14th)	Palomo‡	
2002 (14th)	A.B. Quintanilla and Kumbia Kings	
2002 (14th)	Banda el Recodo	
2002 (14th)	Conjunto Primavera	
2003 (15th)	Intocable‡	
2003 (15th)	Alberto and Roberto	
2003 (15th)	Banda el Recodo	
2003 (15th)	Conjunto Primavera	
2003 (15th)	Germán Lizárraga and su Banda Estrellas de Sinaloa	
2004 (16th)	Kumbia Kings, Juan Gabriel, and El Gran Silencio‡	
2004 (16th)	Conjunto Primavera	
2004 (16th)	Palomo	
2004 (16th)	Intocable	
2005 (17th)	Montez de Durango‡	
2005 (17th)	Banda el Recodo	
2005 (17th)	Conjunto Primavera	
2005 (17th)	Los Tigres del Norte	
2006 (18th)	Intocable‡	
2006 (18th)	Beto y sus Canarios	
2006 (18th)	Conjunto Primavera	
2006 (18th)	K-Paz de la Sierra	
2007 (19th)	Intocable‡	
2007 (19th)	Conjunto Primavera	
2007 (19th)	Grupo Montéz de Durango	
2007 (19th)	Los Tigres del Norte	
2008 (20th)	Intocable‡	
2008 (20th)	Alegres de la Sierra	
2008 (20th)	Conjunto Primavera	
2008 (20th)	Los Tigres del Norte	
2009 (21st)	Alacranes Musical‡	
2009 (21st)	Conjunto Primavera	
2009 (21st)	Montez de Durango	
2009 (21st)	La Arrolladora Banda El Limón	
2009 (21st)	Los Creadorez del Pasito Duranguense de Alfredo Ramírez	
2010 (22nd)	La Arrolladora Banda El Limón‡	
2010 (22nd)	Alacranes Musical	
2010 (22nd)	Banda el Recodo	
2010 (22nd)	Dareyes de la Sierr	
2010 (22nd)	Montéz de Durango	
2011 (23rd)	Banda el Recodo‡	
2011 (23rd)	El Trono de Mexico	
2011 (23rd)	Intocable	
2011 (23rd)	La Arrolladora Banda El Limón	
2011 (23rd)	La Original Banda El Limón	
2012 (24th)	Intocable‡	
2012 (24th)	Banda Los Recoditos	
2012 (24th)	La Arrolladora Banda El Limón	
2012 (24th)	La Original Banda el Limón de Salvador Lizarraga	
2012 (24th)	Voz de Mando	
2013 (25th)	La Arrolladora Banda El Limón de René Camacho‡	
2013 (25th)	La Adictiva Banda San José de Mesillas	
2013 (25th)	Calibre 50	
2013 (25th)	La Original Banda El Limón de Salvador Lizárraga	
2014 (26th)	Banda el Recodo‡	
2014 (26th)	La Arrolladora Banda El Limón de René Camacho	
2014 (26th)	Calibre 50	
2014 (26th)	La Original Banda El Limón de Salvador Lizárraga	
2014 (26th)	Voz de Mando	
2015 (27th)	La Arrolladora Banda El Limón de René Camacho‡	
2015 (27th)	Banda Carnaval	
2015 (27th)	Banda Los Recoditos	
2015 (27th)	Banda Sinaloense MS de Sergio Lizárraga	
2015 (27th)	Calibre 50	
