= Remmy Valenzuela =

Mexican singer and songwriter

Remigio Alejandro Valenzuela Buelna, known as Remmy Valenzuela (born 1 October 1990), is a Mexican singer, songwriter and accordionist of regional Mexican music. He was nominated for the "New Artist of the Year" at the Latin American Music Awards of 2015 and his album Mi Vida en Vida was nominated for the Best Norteño Album at the Latin Grammy Awards of 2015.

== Life ==
Born in Guasave, Sinaloa, Valenzuela started off as a drummer but switched to the accordion at the age of 13. His initial successes were with narcocorridos, but started gaining mass popularity with romantic songs like Te tocó perder. Eventually, he signed with Fonovisa. In 2015, he released his album Mi princesa, of which the single ¿Por qué me ilusionaste? was mentioned as one of the "Best Songs of 2015" by Ben Ratliff of the New York Times.

By the age of 22, he is reported to have "foiled death twice", once after a car crash, and the second time at a shootout between government forces and an organised crime syndicate during a performance in the state of Nayarit. In the state of Sinaloa in 2015, he was arrested for illegal possession of a firearm. He was released on bail after two days.
