= El Coyote (singer) =

- Born: José Angel Ledezma Quintero; November 1, 1970 (age 55); Sinaloa, Mexico
- Origin: Coyotitán, Sinaloa
- Genres: Banda
- Occupation: Singer
- Label: ISA Music
- Website: coyotejoseangel.com

José Angel Ledezma Quintero (born November 1, 1970), known professionally as El Coyote, is a Mexican banda singer. He is the lead vocalist of El Coyote y su Banda Tierra Santa.

== Early life and career ==
Ledezma was born in Sinaloa, Mexico, and grew up in Coyotitán, Sinaloa. Before pursuing a career in music, he aspired to be a professional baseball player. His interest in baseball led him to travel to Mazatlán, Sinaloa, a city known for its prominent banda music scene. During this period, he acquired the nickname "El Coyote." In 1989, Ledezma debuted in Banda El Limón, leaving aside his baseball dreams. As music became his priority, his vocal style and distinctive voice helped establish him as a banda vocalist. Ledezma subsequently performed with several prominent banda groups, including Banda La Costeña de Ramón López Alvarado, La Original Banda El Limón de Salvador Lizárraga, and Banda Los Recoditos. He recorded multiple albums as a vocalist with these groups.

With La Original Banda El Limón, Ledezma recorded the album Me Lo Contaron Ayer, which was released in 1997. He also recorded an album with Banda Los Recoditos for Musart Records in 1997. The album was not released at the time; it was later issued in 2004 under the title Mis Corridos Escondidos. Banda Los Recoditos had previously re-recorded the same songs with another vocalist and released them in 1997 on the album El Nylon. In December 1997, Ledezma began his solo career with the release of his debut album, Aquí Me Quedaré, through EMI Televisa Music. His career produced several popular recordings, including "Piquites de Hormiga," "Árboles de la Barranca," "Me Dicen El Coyote," "Sufro," "Cuando Regreso a Tus Brazos," "Amor Pajarito," "Te Soñé," "Para Impresionarte," "Linda Doctora," "Besitos en el Cuello," and "Y Si Te Robo."

== El Coyote y su Banda Tierra Santa ==
Ledezma became the lead vocalist and performer of El Coyote y su Banda Tierra Santa. The group was associated with Universal Music Latin Entertainment and formerly with Univision Music Group.

In 2026, Ledezma and El Coyote y su Banda Tierra Santa achieved their second number-one song on the Regional Mexican Airplay chart with "Te Dije."

== Discography ==
- 1997 Aqui Me Quedare (first album as a solo artist)
- 1998 Concedeme
- 1999 Profundamente
- 1999 El Amo
- 2000 Te Soñe
- 2001 Cuando Regreso a Tus Brazos
- 2002 Puras Rancheras
- 2002 El Amor No Tiene Edad
- 2003 El Rancho Grande
- 2004 Si Te Vuelves a Enamorar (last album on EMI)
- 2005 Suspiros (first album on Fonovisa)
- 2005 Décimo Aniversario
- 2006 Prohibido
- 2007 La Carretera del Amor
- 2007 La Ley de la Vida
- 2008 El Polo Norte
- 2009 Levanta Tu Vuelo (last album on Fonovisa)
- 2011 Escuela de la Vida (first album on ISA Music)
- 2012 "Como Una Huella Digital"
- 2014 "Aluciné"
- 2015 "Loco Romántico"

Note: The album "Mis Corridos Escondidos" from 2004 is a reissue of Musart of the 1997 Banda Los Recoditos album El Nylon, but is really the first demo he did solo.
