= Voz de Mando =

Regional Mexican band based in Los Angeles

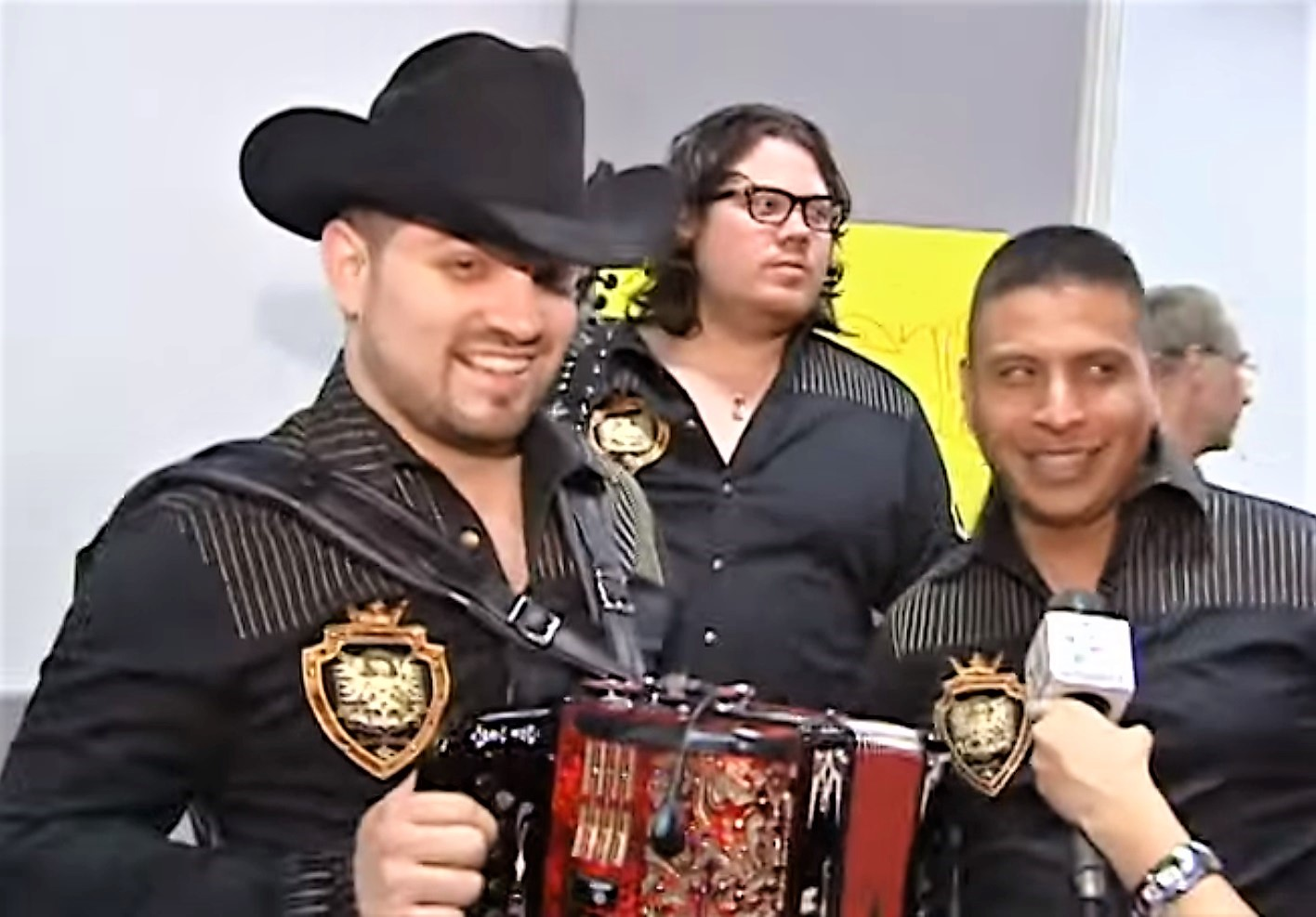
- Voz de Mando interviewed by Dulce Osuna in 2013. Left to right: Jorge Gaxiola, Miguel Gaxiola, Carlos "Charly" Sigala.

Background information
- Also known as: VDM
- Origin: Los Angeles, California, United States
- Genres: Norteño-Banda
- Years active: 2009–present
- Label: AfinArte Music
- Members: Jorge Gaxiola; Miguel Gaxiola; Eduardo "El Chino" Gonzalez; Adrian Gonzalez; Carlos "Charly" Sigala
- Past members: Domingo Bolaños; Fernando Rodriguez

Voz de Mando is a regional Mexican band based in Los Angeles, California, United States. They specialize in the norteño-banda genre.

Their hit single "Levantando Polvadera" won song of the year in the Regional Music category at the 2016 iHeart Radio awards, the first-ever regional Mexican band to win an iHeart radio award.

In 2011, Voz de Mando appeared in the drama film A Better Life. Their hit "Commands M. P. ( 500 Balazos )" was also in the film's soundtrack. In 2016, the band participated in the television series Route 35 starring Danna Garcia and Julio Bracho Castillo. Their single "Compadre No Rajes" was the show's theme song.

== Music career ==
=== Origin ===
From Los Angeles, California, the band members also have roots in the Mexican states of Michoacan and Baja California. The band was founded in 2009.

=== Early ===
The band started in 2007 with their first release, "Escoge Tu Camino". The band made a name for itself with the self-released albums Levantando la Voz (2009) and 12 Impactos de Alto Calibre (2009). The early success led to a contract with Universal's Latin music imprint, Disa Records. In 2010, they released their first major-label album with Con la Nueva Federacion. One of several songs on the album written by Gaxiola brother Miguel, the corrido "Comandos del M.P. (500 Balazos)" was a breakout hit single for the group, reaching the top ten in the Billboard Regional Mexican Songs chart.

In 2011, Voz de Mando appeared in the Oscar nominated film A Better Life, starring Demian Bichir. Their hit "Commands M. P. ( 500 Balazos )" appeared on the film's soundtrack. Subsequent singles "Y Ahora Resulta" (2012) and "Muchacho de Campo" (2013) were crossover hits winning numerous awards, critical and fan recognition.

=== Contemporary (2014 to present) ===
In 2014, the group left Universal Music Group and formed a partnership with Sony Music. Founding band member Jorge Gaxiola formed his independent record label AfinArte Music and, along with Sony, released the band's hit single "Batalla del Golfo". The single formed the basis for Voz de Mando's sixth studio album, Levantado Polvadera. The album's hit single "Levantando Polvadera" won song of the year in the Regional Music category at the 2016 iHeartRadio Music Awards, the first ever Mexican regional band to win an iHeartRadio award.

In 2015, founding member Miguel Gaxiola launched his own line of handmade guitars, Fortaleza Guitars. Fortalezas quickly became a popular instrument in the Mexican music world used by bands like Kinky and Conjunto Primavera.

In 2016, the band appeared in the television series Ruta 35 starring Danna Garcia and Julio Bracho Castillo. Their single "Compadre No Rajes" was the show's original theme song.

In 2017, Voz de Mando released their seventh studio album featuring two chart-topping singles, including the viral hit "Soldado Latinoamericano", which quickly became a hymn of Latino pride in the US and across the border. "Pa’ que no me anden Contando", a top-ten Billboard hit dominated radio play in the US.

== Discography ==
Día D'Concierto	2010	Sony Music Latin
Con La Mente en Blanco	2010	Disa
Impactos de Arranque	2010	Disa
Con La Nueva Federación	2010	Disa
De Corazón Ranchero	2011	Disa
Y Ahora Resulta	2012	Disa
Los Mejores Corridos de	2013	Disa
Levantando Polvadera	2014	AfinArte Music
Compadre No Rajes	2016	AfinArte Music
Clase de Historia	2017	AfinArte Music
