= Julión Álvarez =

Mexican singer

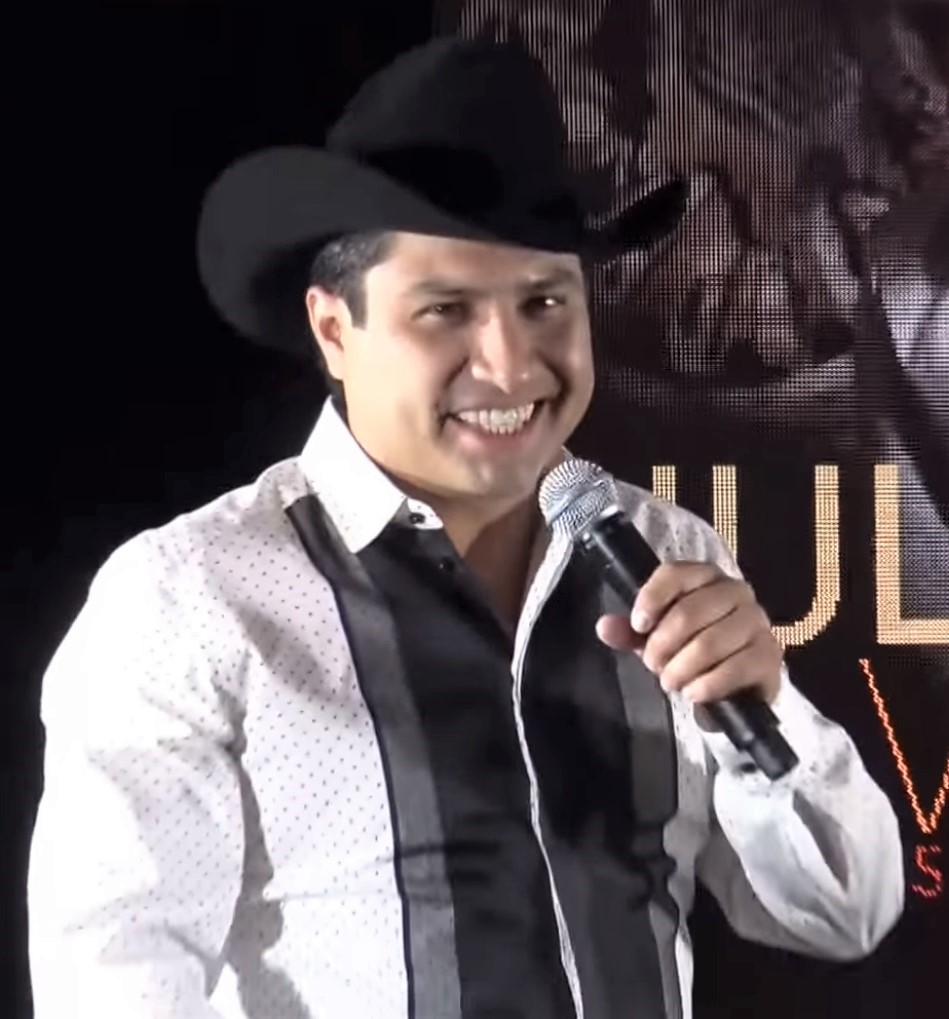
- Álvarez in 2016

Background information
- Born: Julio César Álvarez Montelongo; April 11, 1983 (age 43); La Concordia, Chiapas, Mexico
- Genres: Banda; norteño-banda; mariachi; norteño-sax
- Occupation: Singer
- Years active: 2002–present
- Label: Fonovisa
- Formerly of: Banda MS

Julio César Álvarez Montelongo (born 11 April 1983), better known as Julión Álvarez (Spanish pronunciation: [xuˈljon ˈalβaɾes]), is a Mexican singer who specializes in regional Mexican music.

== Life and career ==
Julión Álvarez was born and raised in La Concordia, Chiapas, México. In 2003, he joined the Mexican band, "Banda MS", until 2006. Following the leave of Banda MS, he decided to start a solo career as Julión Álvarez y su Norteño Banda. In 2011, he married Nathaly Fernández.

In 2014, Álvarez was selected by Miguel Ángel Fox, producer of the Mexican talent show, La Voz... Mexico to participate as coach in its fourth edition. He later went on to be the winning coach with his pupil, Guido Rochin.

In September 2015, Álvarez's album, El Aferrado was nominated at the 16th Annual Latin Grammy Awards for Best Banda Album. His song, "El Amor de Su Vida" was nominated for Latin Grammy Award for Best Regional Song.

In May 2016, it was announced that Álvarez would embark on a 22-Foot Arena Tour in the United States, the first for a regional Mexican act. In September 2016, Álvarez's album, Mis Ídolos, Hoy Mis Amigos!!! was nominated for Best Banda Album at the 2016 Latin Grammy Awards.

On August 10, 2017, the United States Department of the Treasury, froze Álvarez's assets in the United States and forbid American persons and companies from doing business with him for allegedly violating the Foreign Narcotics Kingpin Designation Act. As a result, Álvarez's U.S. tour was cancelled. Álvarez had denied the allegation brought by the U.S. Treasury Department and said he was willing to cooperate with authorities.

In November 2017, it was announced that Álvarez's album, Ni Diablo, Ni Santo was nominated for Best Regional Mexican Music Album at the 60th Annual Grammy Awards.

In June 2022, after five years working in coordination with the authorities of both countries, it was announced that Álvarez's allegations linked to the Foreign Narcotics Kingpin Designation Act were finally removed and he may continue to perform and engage in businesses on the United States.

In mid-April 2025, Alvarez returned to the U.S. as a performer for the first time in eight years, performing three sold-out shows at SoFi Stadium in Inglewood, California.

In May 2025 during the second Trump Administration, his United States visa was revoked, cancelling a sold-out concert in Arlington, Texas, which was part of the 42 18 Tour.

== Discography ==
- Corazón Mágico (2007)
- Desde Mazatlan a Mover el Cu.... (2008)
- Cumbia del Río (2008)
- Corridos (2008)
- Corridos Privados (2009)
- Con Banda (2009)
- Ni Lo Intentes (2010)
- El Rey del Carnaval (2010)
- Vive Grupero, El Concierto (2010)
- Márchate y Olvídame (2011)
- En Vivo Desde Guadalajara (2012)
- Tu Amigo Nada Más (2013)
- Soy Lo Que Quiero:...Indispensable (2014)
- El Aferrado (2015)
- La Más Completa Collecion (2015)
- Mis Ídolos, Hoy Mis Amigos!!! (2016)
- Ni Diablo, Ni Santo (2017)
- Este Soy Yo (2019)
- Incomparable (2021)
- De Hoy En Adelante, Que Te Vaya Bien (2022)
- Presente (2023)
- 42 18 (2025)

== Awards and nominations ==
=== American Music Awards ===
The American Music Awards is an annual American music awards show. Nominees are selected on commercial performance such as sales and airplay. Winners are determined by a poll of the public and fans who vote through the AMAs website.

Year	Nominee / work	Award	Result
2025	Julión Álvarez y su Norteña Banda	Favorite Latin Duo or Group	Won

=== Grammy Awards ===
The Grammy Awards are awarded annually by the National Academy of Recording Arts and Sciences of the United States. Álvarez has received one nomination.

Year	Nominee / work	Award	Result
2018	Ni Diablo, Ni Santo	Best Regional Mexican Music Album	Nominated

=== Latin American Music Awards ===
The Latin American Music Awards are awarded annually by the television network Telemundo in the United States. Álvarez has received two awards from five nominations.

Year	Nominee / work	Award	Result
2015	Julión Álvarez y su Norteña Banda	Artist of the Year	Nominated
2015	Julión Álvarez y su Norteña Banda	Favorite Regional Mexican Band, Duo, or Group	Won
2015	"Y Fue Así"	Favorite Regional Mexican Song	Won
2016	Mis Ídolos, Hoy Mis Amigos!!!'	Favorite Regional Mexican Album	Nominated
2016	Julión Álvarez y su Norteña Banda	Favorite Regional Mexican Band, Duo, or Group	Nominated

=== Latin Grammy Awards ===
The Latin Grammy Awards are awarded annually by the Latin Academy of Recording Arts & Sciences in the United States. Álvarez has received three nominations.

Year	Nominee / work	Award	Result
2015	El Aferrado	Best Banda Album	Nominated
2015	"El Amor De Su Vida"	Best Regional Mexican Song	Nominated
2016	Mis Ídolos, Hoy Mis Amigos!!!	Best Banda Album	Nominated
2023	De Hoy en Adelante, Que Te Vaya Bien	Best Banda Album	Won
2025	4218	Best Banda Album	Won

=== Lo Nuestro Awards ===
The Lo Nuestro Awards are awarded annually by the television network Univision in the United States. Álvarez has received three awards from fifteen nominations.

Year	Nominee / work	Award	Result
2011	Julión Álvarez (himself)	Regional Mexican Male Artist of the Year	Nominated
2012	Julión Álvarez (himself)	Banda Artist of the Year	Nominated
2012	Julión Álvarez (himself)	Regional Mexican Male Artist of the Year	Nominated
2013	Márchate y Olvídame	Regional Mexican Album of the Year	Nominated
2013	Julión Álvarez (himself)	Regional Mexican Male Artist of the Year	Nominated
2014	Tu Amigo Nada Más	Regional Mexican Album of the Year	Nominated
2014	Julión Álvarez (himself)	Regional Mexican Male Artist of the Year	Nominated
2015	Soy Lo Que Quiero... Indispensable	Regional Mexican Album of the Year	Nominated
2015	Julión Álvarez (himself)	Regional Mexican Male Artist of the Year	Nominated
2016	Julión Álvarez (himself)	Banda Artist of the Year	Nominated
2016	"Y Fue Así"	Regional Mexican Song of the Year	Won
2016	Julión Álvarez (himself)	Regional Mexican Male Artist of the Year	Nominated
2017	Julión Álvarez (himself)	Banda Artist of the Year	Won
2017	Julión Álvarez (himself)	Regional Mexican Male Artist of the Year	Won
2017	Julión Álvarez (himself)	Male Artist of the Year	Nominated
