= Banda MS =

Mexican banda group

Banda MS de Sergio Lizárraga
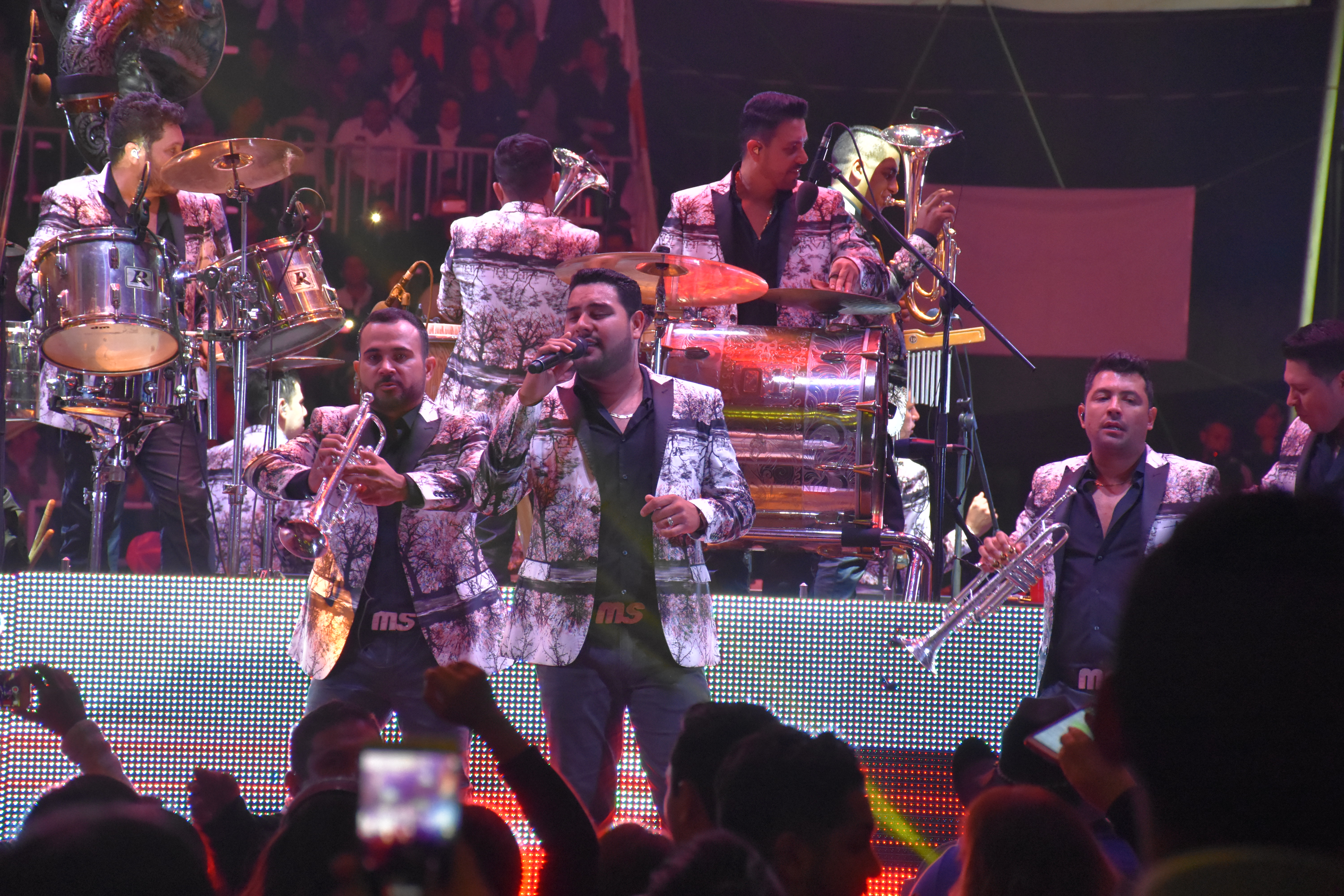

Background information
- Also known as: Banda Sinaloense MS de Sergio Lizárraga
- Origin: Mazatlán, Sinaloa, México
- Genre: Banda
- Years active: 2003–present
- Labels: Lizos Music; Remex Music; Discos Sabinas; Disa; Ferca Records
- Members: Alan Ramírez; Oswaldo Silvas (Walo); Kross 117; Jairo Osuna; Alberto Lizárraga; Pavel Ocampo; Elías Nordahl Piña; David Castro Lejarza; Ricardo Nordahl Piña; Nicolás Tiznado; José Osuna, Armonía; Francisco Hernández; José Viera; José Rojas; Roberto Frausto; Christian Osuna; Luis Fernando Osuna
- Past members: Julión Álvarez; Geovanni Mondragón
- Website: http://www.bandams.com.mx

Banda MS de Sergio Lizárraga, or simply Banda MS, is a Mexican banda group from Mazatlán, Sinaloa, founded in 2003. The MS stands for Mazatlán, Sinaloa. It was created by brothers Sergio and Alberto Lizárraga, who are also members of the group. They debuted in 2004 with their album No Podrás. Their album Qué Bendición reached number one on the Billboard Latin albums chart in the United States.

== History ==
Julión Álvarez served as a vocalist for Banda MS from 2003 to 2007, after which point he left the band to become a solo artist. On 12 February 2016 the band received an award from Monitor Latino for their song "Solo Con Verte", which was a number one song for twelve consecutive weeks on the chart. They received the award at the Verizon Theatre at Grand Prairie, which also marked their first concert in their United States tour.

In July 2016, Banda MS's lead singer, Alan Ramirez, was shot in the neck in Mexico City while traveling to see his wife at a local hotel. During a press conference band member Oswaldo Silva stated that they did not believe that the shooter intended to murder Ramirez, nor did they believe that the shooting was drug-related, further stating that they did not have any ties with drug trafficking. Ramirez was not critically injured.

== Members ==
- Alan Ramírez, vocalist
- Oswaldo Silvas (Walo), vocalist
- Jairo Osuna, clarinet
- Pavel Ocampo, clarinet
- Elías Nordahl Piña, trumpet
- David Castro Lejarza, trumpet
- Ricardo Nordahl Piña, trumpet
- Nicolás Tiznado, tenor horn
- José Osuna, tenor horn
- Francisco Hernández, trombone
- José Viera, trombone
- José Rojas, trombone
- Roberto Frausto, tuba
- Christian Osuna, drum
- Luis Fernando Osuna, snare drum
- Armando Ramírez, vocalist
- Gerson Leos, piano
- Jessi Gomez, piano
- Alen Mesa, tuba

== Discography ==
- 2005: No Podrás
- 2006: Mi Mayor Anhelo
- 2007: La Raza Contenta
- 2008: Escuela de Rancho
- 2009: En Preparación
- 2011: Amor Enfermo
- 2012: Mi Razón de Ser
- 2013: 10 Aniversario
- 2014: No Me Pidas Perdón
- 2015: En Vivo Guadalajara-Monterrey
- 2016: Que Bendición
- 2017: La Mejor Mersión de Mí
- 2018: Con Todas Las Fuerzas
- 2019: En Vivo CDMX
- 2020: El Trabajo Es La Suerte
- 2021: Positivo (Versión Acústica)
- 2022: Punto y Aparte
- 2023: MS 20 Años
- 2023: Navidad con La MS
- 2025: Edición Limitada
- 2026: 10 de 10

== Awards ==
Year	Award	Category	Nominated work	Result	Ref.
2012	Premios De La Radio	Band of the Year	Banda MS	Nominated	
2012	Premios De La Radio	Band Album of the Year	Amor Enfermo	Nominated	
2013	Premio Grammy Latino	Best Regional Mexican Song	Mi Razon De Ser	Nominated	
2013	Premios Banda Max	Song of the Year	Mi Razon De Ser	Nominated	
2013	Premios Banda Max	Most Requested Video	Mi Razon De Ser	Won	
2013	Premios Banda Max	Best Video Production	Mi Razon De Ser	Nominated	
2013	Premios Banda Max	Band of The Year	Banda MS	Nominated	
2013	Premios De La Radio	Band of the Year	Banda MS	Nominated	
2014	Premio Lo Nuestro	Regional Mexican Album of the Year	Mi Razon De Ser	Nominated	
2014	Billboard Latin Music Award	Hot Latin Song	Banda MS	Nominated	
2014	Premio Bandamax	Song of the Year	Hermosa Experiencia	Won	
2014	Premio Bandamax	Most Requested Video	No Me Pidas Perdon	Nominated	
2014	Premio Bandamax	Most Influent Artist On Social Media	Banda MS	Nominated	
2014	Premio Bandamax	Band of the Year	Banda MS	Won	
2014	Premios De La Radio	Band of the Year	Banda MS	Nominated	
2014	Premios De La Radio	Band Song of the Year	Hermosa Experiencia	Nominated	
2014	Premios De La Radio	Video of the Year	Hermosa Experiencia	Won	
2015	Premios De Radio	Artist of the Year	Banda Ms	Won	
2015	Premios De Radio	Band of the Year	Banda Ms	Nominated	
2015	Premios De Radio	Band Disc of the Year	No Me Pidas Perdon	Nominated	
2015	Premios De Radio	Band Song of the Year	A Lo Mejor	Nominated	
2015	Premios De Radio	Video Of the Year	Hablame De Ti	Nominated	
2015	Latin American Music Awards	Regional Mexican Group Or Duo of the Year	Banda MS	Nominated	
2015	Latin American Music Awards	Regional Favorite Song	Hablame De Ti	Nominated	
2015	Latin American Music Awards	Favorite Streamed Song	Hablame De Ti	Nominated	
2015	Premio Lo Nuestro	Band of the Year	Banda MS	Nominated	
2015	Premio Lo Nuestro	Regional Mexican Group Or Duo of the Year	Banda MS	Nominated	
2015	Premio Lo Nuestro	Song of the Year	A Lo Mejor	Nominated	
2015	Billboard Latin Music Award	Regional Song Of The Year	Hermosa Experincia	Won	
2015	Billboard Latin Music Award	Hot Latin Song	Banda Ms	Won	
2015	Billboard Latin Music Award	Top Latin Album of the Year	Banda Ms	Nominated	
2015	Billboard Latin Music Award	Regional Mexican Songs of the Year	Banda Ms	Nominated	
2015	Billboard Latin Music Award	Regional Mexican Album of the Year	Banda Ms	Nominated	
2016	Premio Lo Nuestro	Artist Band of the Year	Banda MS	Nominated	
2016	Premio Lo Nuestro	Mexican Group Or Duo of the Year	Banda MS	Nominated	
2016	Billboard Latin Music Award	Most Streamed Song	Mi Razon De Ser	Nominated	
2016	Billboard Latin Music Award	Artist Group or Duo of the Year	Banda MS	Nominated	
2016	Billboard Latin Music Award	Hot Latin Songs	Banda MS	Won	
2016	Billboard Latin Music Award	Regional Mexican Songs	Banda MS	Won	
2016	Billboard Latin Music Award	Regional Mexican Albums	Banda MS	Nominated	
2016	Billboard Music Award	Band of the Year	Banda MS	Won	
2016	Latin American Award	Artist of the Year	Banda MS	Won	
2016	Latin American Award	Regional Mexican Group or Duo of the Year	Banda MS	Nominated	
2016	Latin American Award	Album of the Year	Que Bendicion	Nominated	
2016	Latin American Award	Favorite Regional Albums	Que Bendicion	Won	
2016	Latin American Award	Song of the Year	Solo Con Verte	Nominated	
2016	Latin American Award	Favorite Regional Song of the Year	Solo Con Verte	Won	
2016	Premio La Radio	Artist of the Year	Banda MS	Won	
2016	Premio La Radio	Regional Mexican Group or Duo of the Year	Banda MS	Won	
2016	Premio La Radio	Band of the Year	Que Bendicion	Won	
2016	Premio La Radio	Band Song of the Year	Me Vas A Extranar	Won	
2017	Premio Lo Nuestro	Artist of the Year	Banda MS	Nominated	
2017	Premio Lo Nuestro	Group or Duo of the Year	Banda MS	Nominated	
2017	Premio Lo Nuestro	Regional Mexican Group or Duo of the Year	Banda MS	Won	
2017	Premio Lo Nuestro	Banda Artist	Banda MS	Won	
2017	Premio Lo Nuestro	Single of the Year	"Solo Con Verte"	Won	
2017	Premio Lo Nuestro	Regional Mexican Song	"Solo Con Verte"	Won	
2017	Premio Lo Nuestro	Regional Mexican Album	Qué Bendición	Won	
2017	Premio de la Radio	Band of the Year	Banda MS	Won	
2017	Premio de la Radio	Disc of the Year	La Mejor Version De Mi	Won	
2017	Premio de la Radio	Regional song of the year	Es Tuyo Mi Amor	Won	
2017	Latin American Award	Artist of the Year	Banda Ms	Won	
2017	Latin American Award	Regional Mexican Group Or Duo of the Year	Banda Ms	Won	
2017	Latin American Award	Song of the Year	Tengo Que Colgar	Won	
2017	Latin American Award	Favorite Regional song of the Year	Tengo Que Colgar	Won	
2017	Premios Bandamax	Song of the Year	Tengo Que Colgar	Nominated	
2017	Premios Bandamax	Disc Of the Year	Que Bendicion	Won	
2017	Premios Bandamax	Band Of the Year	Banda Ms	Won	
2017	Premios Juventud	Best song for the "Truck"	Es Tuyo Mi Amor	Won	
2017	Premios Juventud	Best Song for "Love"	Tengo Que Colgar	Won	
2017	Billboard Latin Music Award	Hot Latin Song	Banda MS	Won	
2017	Billboard Latin Music Award	Top Latin Albums	Banda MS	Won	
2017	Billboard Latin Music Award	Regional Mexican Song	Banda MS	Won	
2017	Billboard Latin Music Award	Regional Mexican Album	Banda MS	Won	
2017	Billboard Latin Music Award	Latin Album of the Year	Que Bendicion	Won	
2017	Billboard Latin Music Award	Regional Mexican Album of the Year	Que Bendicion	Won	
2017	Billboard Latin Music Award	Regional Mexican Song of the Year	Solo Con Verte	Won	
2017	Billboard Latin Music Award	Regional Mexican Song of the Year	Me Vas A Extranar	Won	
2017	IHeartRadio Music Award	Regional Mexican Song Of the Year	Solo Con Verte	Won	
2022	American Music Awards	Favorite Latin Duo or Group	Banda MS	Nominated	
