= FONO (record label) =

American Spanish language record label

- Official logo for FONO
- Parent company: Universal Music Group (2008–present); Univision Music Group (2002–2008); Televisa (1984-2002)
- Founded: 1984; 42 years ago
- Founder: Guillermo Santiso
- Distributor: Universal Music Group
- Genre: Latin pop, Regional Mexican, Tropical
- Country of origin: United States
- Location: Hollywood, California
- Official website: www.fono.global/en

FONO (formerly known as Fonovisa and Disa Records before their merge in 2025) is an American Spanish language record label founded in 1984 by Guillermo Santiso as a subsidiary of Televisa. Its former name before being acquired by Televisa in 1984 was Profono Internacional, which was founded in 1978. FONO mainly produces Mexican style music. It is well known for its signing with artists such as Los Tigres Del Norte, Los Bukis, Los Temerarios, Enrique Iglesias, Lucero and Thalía.

In late 2002, FONO was acquired from Televisa by the Univision Music Group. FONO was owned by the Univision Music Group until May 2008 when it was bought by Universal Music Group. It is now part of Universal Music Latin Entertainment. FONO headquarters are now in the Capitol Records Building, in Hollywood, California.

== History ==
The company was originally founded in the 1970s under the name Profono Internacional, later rebranding as Laser in the early 1980s.

In 1984, it adopted its current name, with prominent artists including Grupo Mojado, Los Tigres del Norte, Duelo, and Banda Toro. The latter rose to prominence with the 1994 release of "La noche que Chicago murió," a song that has since garnered over 300 million streams. Banda Toro also became a leading exponent of the quebradita genre with other notable hits such as "La ruca no era ruca," "Los Ríos de Babilonia," "El hijo desobediente," and "Anoche me enamoré." During the same period, the label achieved significant commercial success with acts such as Los Humildes, Los Bukis, Los Caminantes, Rigo Tovar, and Los Yonic's. Some artists were signed to other labels while being in the FONO roster for distribution purposes. (Note: Artists and groups like Pesado and Banda Machos were under Metro Casa Musical, whereas artists like Impacto de Montemorelos and Los Mier were under Sony Music Entertainment Latin. While signed to both, Fonovisa would distribute their music based on region.)

In the 1980s, FONO acquired Discos y Cintas Melody, S.A., formerly known as Discos y Cartuchos de México, S.A. (DCM), establishing the "Melody" imprint. This sublabel focused on pop and rock artists, with acts such as Timbiriche, Flans, Lucero, and Thalía. Other artists under Melody included Enrique Iglesias (from 1995 to 1998), Sparx, and Lorenzo Antonio.

By late 1997 and early 1998, FONO dissolved its Musivisa and Melody sublabels, incorporating their artists into the main Fonovisa label.

In late 2002, FONO was acquired from Televisa by Univision Music Group, joining Univision Records and Disa Records under the same umbrella. In 2008, Universal Music Group purchased Univision Music Group, leading to the closure of Univision Records. FONO is currently headquartered in Hollywood, California.

In May 2025, Fonovisa merged with Disa to rebrand as FONO. Their slogan is "Música, No Borders"

=== Lawsuits ===
On January 25, 1996, FONO was allowed to proceed with its copyright infringement lawsuit against Cherry Auction (which is known for operating the Cherry Avenue Auction in Fresno, CA) for allowing vendors to sell unlicensed records.

FONO itself, however, became the subject of controversy in 1999 when the record label admitted to paying radio stations millions of dollars in payola to play songs from FONO artists. Santiso was also charged with tax evasion during the process. In the same year, Interscope Records filed a lawsuit against FONO over its unauthorized inclusion of Enrique Iglesias's song "Bailamos" in a greatest hits compilation. At the time, Iglesias had already ended his contract with Fonovisa and was preparing to release his first English-language album under Interscope. By the time the lawsuit was filed, the compilation had sold over one million copies. Interscope later withdrew the suit, which had threatened to shutter FONO. A revised version of the compilation, excluding "Bailamos", was released shortly thereafter.

== 25th Anniversary ==
In 2009, FONO celebrated their 25th anniversary as a record label by releasing special editions of previously released albums by artists on their rosters, multi-volume compilations, a La Historia De Los Éxitos collection based on the label's roster's genres. For the special edition albums, the cover was modified so that it showed the original cover in the middle with a black border surrounding it. In a corner of the original album cover, a 25th anniversary version of the label's logo would be placed, and in the top middle of the border, there would be text saying "Edición Especial • 25 Aniversario". The label's slogan for their 25th anniversary celebration was "Fonovisa: La Historia De Los Éxitos".

The full lineup for the La Historia De Los Éxitos collection were

- The standard and first compilation of the lineup, which consisted of 25 tracks split into two discs (released on January 20, 2009)
- A banda version, which consisted of 25 songs in the banda genre split into two discs (released on March 24, 2009)
- A DVD compiation with 15 music videos (released on March 31, 2009, just one week after the banda version)
- A norteño version, which consisted of 20 songs in the norteño genre (Note: in the Mexico release, Paz En Este Amor by Fidel Rueda is replaced by Un Idiota Como Yo by Duelo) (released on April 21, 2009)
- A cumbia version, titled "Bailables", which consisted of 20 songs in the cumbia genre (released on May 25, 2009)
- A corridos version, titled "Corridos Pesados", which consisted of 20 corridos (released on June 20, 2009)
- A parranderas version, which consisted of 20 songs that are considered songs to drink or party to (Note: in the Mexico release, most of the tracks are replaced and the tracklist goes from 20 to 18 songs) (released on July 21, 2009 to the general public, whereas the alternative tracklist version was released on September 15, 2009)
- A mariachi version, which consisted of 20 songs in the mariachi/ranchera genre (released on August 25, 2009)
- A pop-goes-regional mexican version, titled "Pop a La Mexicana", which consisted of 20 tracks, mostly regional mexican versions (Note: in the Mexico release, one of the compilation's tracks is replaced by Paulina Rubio's "El Último Adiós") (released on September 22, 2009)
- A romantic version, titled "Románticas", which consisted of 20 love songs (released on October 13, 2009)

Other compilations released for FONO's 25th anniversary were "25 Aniversario Fonovisa", a five volume compilation including artists from the label's foundation to their 2009 celebration, released in mid-2009. A 15 track Mother's Day compilation titled "Para Ti Madrecita: 15 Super Éxitos" was released on March 24, 2009, consisting of 15 tracks dedicated to all the mothers around the world. A 25 track, 2-disc compilation titled "Las 25 Más Románticas Con Los Supergrupos" was released on February 10, 2009, consisting of 25 tracks in the grupero genre. A live album was also released for the celebration, titled "Fonovisa 25 Aniversario: El Concierto".

The year-long anniversary schedule was supported by TV and internet campaigns.

Some artists that got albums reissued with the 25th anniversary CDs were

- Banda El Recodo (Por Ti, Tengo Una Ilusión, No Me Sé Rajar & De Parranda Con La Banda)
- Los Bukis (Quiéreme, Si Me Recuerdas, Me Volvi A Acordar de Ti, Inalcanzable, Mi Fantasia, Y Para Siempre...)
- Los Temerarios (Mi Vida Eres Tú, Tu Última Canción, Te Quiero, Cómo Te Recuerdo, Veintisiete, En La Madrugada Se Fue, Una Lágrima No Basta)
- Grupo Mojado (Sueño y Realidad)

== Current artists in FONO ==
- Aaron y Su Grupo Ilusión
- Adriel Favela
- Alejandro Fernández
- Banda Carnaval
- Banda El Recodo
- Banda Los Recoditos
- Bobby Pulido
- Calibre 50
- Camila Fernández
- Carolina Ross
- Crecer Germán
- Danny Felix
- Grupo Cañaveral de Humberto Pabón
- Liberación
- Jesús Chaparro
- Juan Rivera
- Jazmín López
- Joan Sebastian
- La Arrolladora Banda El Limón de René Camacho
- Los Tigres del Norte
- Majo Aguilar
- Octavio Cuadras
- Sergio Vega "El Shaka"
- Valentín Elizalde
- Vikilo

== Former artists in FONO ==
- After Party
- Alacranes Musical
- Alicia Villarreal
- Alfredo Olivas
- Ana Bárbara
- Anahí
- Aroma
- Avenida 6
- Banda Movil
- Banda Pequeños Musical
- Beto y Sus Canarios
- Bronco
- Cardenales de Nuevo León
- Chavela Y Su Grupo Express
- Chayito Valdez
- Chiquis
- Chuy Lizárraga y su Banda Tierra Sinaloense
- Conjunto Azabache
- Conjunto Primavera
- Cristian Castro
- Cristina
- Crooked Stilo
- Cuisillos
- Dareyes De La Sierra
- Duelo
- El Bebeto
- El Chapo De Sinaloa
- Elsa García
- El Golpe
- El Tigrillo Palma
- El Trono de México
- Enrique Iglesias
- Germán Lizárraga y Sus Estrellas De Sinaloa
- Graciela Beltrán
- Grupo Bryndis
- Grupo Exterminador
- Grupo Flash
- Grupo Pegasso
- Grupo Toppaz de Reynaldo Flores
- Hechizeros Band
- Hector Montemayor
- Impacto de Montemorelos
- Industria Del Amor
- Ivan
- Jenni Rivera
- J.L.B. y Cia.
- Julión Álvarez y Su Norteño Banda
- K-Paz De La Sierra
- Larry Hernandez
- La Mafia
- La Revolución de Emiliano Zapata
- La Sombra
- Los Acosta
- Los Acuario De Mexico
- Los Angeles De Charly
- Los Angeles Azules
- Los Barbaros
- Los Baron de Apodaca
- Los Bondadosos
- Los Brios
- Los Bukis
- Los Saylors
- Los Strwck
- Los Temerarios
- Los Tigrillos
- Los Tucanes de Tijuana
- Los Mier
- Los Palominos
- Los Rehenes
- Los Reyes Locos
- Los Vallenatos de La Cumbia
- Los Yonic's
- Lorenzo Antonio
- Lucero
- Mandingo
- Marco Antonio Solís
- Menudo
- Montez de Durango
- Noelia
- Patrulla 81
- Pedro Fernández
- Remmy Valenzuela
- Rigo Tovar y su Costa Azul
- Roberto Tapia
- Samuray
- Saul El Jaguar
- Sonora Maracaibo
- Thalía
- Timbiriche
- Tropa F

== Labels partnered with FONO ==
- Andaluz Music
- Del Rancho Music, LLC
- Desierto Bravo
- DInero Nuevo Records, LLC
- El Recodo Enterprises, LLC
- Ferca Network
- RMS Music Group, Inc. (Los Tigres del Norte's label)
- Suceción de José Manuel Figueroa Figueroa (Joan Sebastian's estate)

== Labels previously partnered with FONO ==
- AFG SIgma Records (Los Temerarios' label, now named Virtus Inc)
- Aguila Records, Inc.
- American Show Latin (mainly partnered with Machete Music, but focused more on Regional Mexican and subgenres like Duranguense, Banda and Norteño)
- Azteca Records, LLC
- Camiolvi Inc.
- DEL Records, Inc.
- DMY Digital (Fonovisa distributed Los Rehenes and Los Grey's works on CD
- Good I Music, LLC (Intocable's label, formerly named Intocable, LLC)
- Luna Music Corporation
- Musinorte Entertainment Corp. (Los Huracanes Del Norte's record label)
- Platino Records
- Tucanes Inc.

== See also ==
- List of record labels
