= List of top 100 songs for 2017 in Mexico =

These are the lists of the General Top 100 songs of 2017 in Mexico according to Monitor Latino. Monitor Latino issued two year-end General charts: one which ranked the songs by their number of Spins (Tocadas) on the Mexican radio, and the other ranked the songs by their estimated audience. Monitor Latino also issued separate year-end charts for Regional Mexican, Pop and Anglo songs.

== Spins ==
No.	Title	Artist(s)
1	"Despacito"	Luis Fonsi ft. Daddy Yankee & Justin Bieber
2	"Adiós amor"	Christian Nodal
3	"Durmiendo en el lugar equivocado"	La Adictiva Banda San José de Mesillas
4	"Shape of You"	Ed Sheeran
5	"Mi gente"	J Balvin & Willy William ft. Beyoncé
6	"Sé que te duele"	Alejandro Fernández ft. Morat
7	"Felices los 4"	Maluma
8	"Ella es mi mujer"	Banda Carnaval
9	"Probablemente"	Christian Nodal ft. David Bisbal
10	"Something Just like This"	The Chainsmokers ft. Coldplay
11	"Siempre te voy a querer"	Calibre 50
12	"Las Ultras"	Calibre 50
13	"Que se canse de llamar"	Los Plebes del Rancho de Ariel Camacho
14	"Me enamoré"	Shakira
15	"Amárrame"	Mon Laferte ft. Juanes
16	"El paciente"	Alfredo Olivas
17	"Me está tirando el rollo"	Banda Los Recoditos
18	"Attention"	Charlie Puth
19	"En definitiva"	Alfredo Olivas
20	"Sigo extrañándote"	J Balvin
21	"Las cosas no se hacen así"	Banda MS
22	"Esta noche se me olvida"	Julión Álvarez y su Norteño Banda
23	"Súbeme la radio"	Enrique Iglesias ft. Descemer Bueno and Zion & Lennox
24	"La princesa"	La Adictiva Banda San José de Mesillas
25	"Casada o no"	Chuy Lizárraga y su Banda Tierra Sinaloense
26	"No le hago falta"	Banda Los Recoditos
27	"Hey DJ"	CNCO
28	"Rockabye"	Clean Bandit ft. Anne-Marie & Sean Paul
29	"That's What I Like"	Bruno Mars
30	"Corrido de Juanito"	Calibre 50
31	"Chantaje"	Shakira ft. Maluma
32	"Alguien robó"	Sebastián Yatra ft. Nacho & Wisin
33	"Ojalá que me olvides"	La Arrolladora Banda El Limón
34	¿Para qué lastimarme?	Gerardo Ortiz
35	"Caricias clandestinas"	Remmy Valenzuela
36	"Vacaciones"	Wisin
37	"Dentro de tu corazón"	Banda Los Sebastianes
38	"Ayer y hoy"	Banda el Recodo
39	"Sign of the Times"	Harry Styles
40	"Reggaetón Lento (Bailemos)"	CNCO
41	"Haz lo que quieras"	Alicia Villarreal
42	"Loco enamorado"	Remmy Valenzuela
43	"El amante"	Nicky Jam
44	"El color de tus ojos"	Banda MS
45	"Tuesday"	Burak Yeter ft. Danelle Sandoval
46	"It Ain't Me"	Kygo ft. Selena Gomez
47	"Culpable tú"	Alta Consigna
48	"Es tuyo mi amor"	Banda MS
49	"Mi buen amor"	Mon Laferte ft. Enrique Bunbury
50	"Hear Me Now"	Alok ft. Bruno Martini & Zeeba
51	"There's Nothing Holdin' Me Back"	Shawn Mendes
52	"Me prometí olvidarte"	Banda El Recodo
53	"Me rehúso"	Danny Ocean
54	"I Feel It Coming"	The Weeknd ft. Daft Punk
55	"¿Por qué me enamoré?"	Ulises Chaidez y sus Plebes
56	"Afuera está lloviendo"	Julión Álvarez y su Norteño Banda
57	"Vale la pena"	Banda el Recodo
58	"Cuando un hombre te enamora"	Gloria Trevi & Alejandra Guzmán
59	"Casi humanos"	Dvicio
60	"Una lady como tú"	Manuel Turizo
61	"Cómo no adorarla"	Banda Carnaval
62	"¿Cómo fue?"	Los Plebes del Rancho de Ariel Camacho
63	"Be Mine"	Ofenbach
64	"Optimista"	Caloncho
65	"Amor con hielo"	Morat
66	"Báilame"	Nacho
67	"Thunder"	Imagine Dragons
68	"Traicionera"	La Arrolladora Banda El Limón
69	"Just Hold On"	Steve Aoki ft. Louis Tomlinson
70	"Wild Thoughts"	DJ Khaled ft. Bryson Tiller & Rihanna
71	"No es tan fácil"	Impacto Sinaloense
72	"Desde que la vi"	Los De La Noria
73	"Porque tomando"	El Bebeto
74	"Hermosa ingrata"	Juanes
75	"Ya me vi"	Los Buitres de Culiacán
76	"El ratico"	Juanes ft. Kali Uchis
77	"Feels"	Calvin Harris ft. Big Sean, Katy Perry & Pharrell Williams
78	"Se defiende"	La Séptima Banda
79	"Tengo ganas"	Valentín Elizalde ft. Alfredo Ríos "El Komander"
80	"Vente pa' ca"	Ricky Martin ft. Maluma
81	"Feel It Still"	Portugal The Man
82	"Te juro"	Samo
83	"Hasta que amanezca"	Lucero
84	"Me provoca y me domina"	Pee Wee
85	"¿Por qué no te enamoras?"	Joss Favela
86	"Los viejitos"	Marco Flores y la Jerez
87	"Robarte un Beso"	Carlos Vives ft. Sebastián Yatra
88	"24K Magic"	Bruno Mars
89	"Don't Wanna Know"	Maroon 5
90	"Uno más"	Fidel Rueda
91	"Secuelas de amor"	Chayín Rubio
92	"Mi perdición"	Playa Limbo
93	"En vida"	Banda Los Sebastianes
94	"Ella"	Ricardo Arjona
95	"Los ángeles existen"	Pesado
96	"Lo digo"	Carlos Rivera ft. Gente de Zona
97	"Escápate conmigo"	Wisin ft. Ozuna
98	"Swalla"	Jason Derulo ft. Nicki Minaj
99	"Arrepentido"	Intocable
100	"¿Cómo te atreves?"	Morat

== Audience ==
No.	Title	Artist(s)
1	"Despacito"	Luis Fonsi ft. Daddy Yankee & Justin Bieber
2	"Adiós amor"	Christian Nodal
3	"Durmiendo en el lugar equivocado"	La Adictiva Banda San José de Mesillas
4	"Shape of You"	Ed Sheeran
5	"Siempre te voy a querer"	Calibre 50
6	"Felices los 4"	Maluma
7	"El paciente"	Alfredo Olivas
8	"Mi gente"	J Balvin & Willy William ft. Beyoncé
9	"Me enamoré"	Shakira
10	"Hey DJ"	CNCO
11	"Súbeme la radio"	Enrique Iglesias ft. Descemer Bueno and Zion & Lennox
12	"Sé que te duele"	Alejandro Fernández ft. Morat
13	"Las cosas no se hacen así"	Banda MS
14	"Something Just like This"	The Chainsmokers ft. Coldplay
15	"Las Ultras"	Calibre 50
16	"¿Para qué lastimarme?"	Gerardo Ortiz
17	"Casi humanos"	Dvicio
18	"Rockabye"	Clean Bandit ft. Anne-Marie & Sean Paul
19	"Tuesday"	Burak Yeter ft. Danelle Sandoval
20	"La princesa"	La Adictiva Banda San José de Mesillas
21	"Una lady como tú"	Manuel Turizo
22	"Hear Me Now"	Alok ft. Bruno Martini & Zeeba
23	"Afuera está lloviendo"	Julión Álvarez y su Norteño Banda
24	"Attention"	Charlie Puth
25	"Be Mine"	Ofenbach
26	"Reggaetón Lento (Bailemos)"	CNCO
27	"Probablemente"	Christian Nodal ft. David Bisbal
28	"En definitiva"	Alfredo Olivas
29	"Ella es mi mujer"	Banda Carnaval
30	"Sign of the Times"	Harry Styles
31	"Ojalá que me olvides"	La Arrolladora Banda El Limón
32	"Chantaje"	Shakira ft. Maluma
33	"Feel It Still"	Portugal The Man
34	"I Feel It Coming"	The Weeknd ft. Daft Punk
35	"El color de tus ojos"	Banda MS
36	"Amárrame"	Mon Laferte ft. Juanes
37	"Just Hold On"	Steve Aoki ft. Louis Tomlinson
38	"El amante"	Nicky Jam
39	"Robarte un Beso"	Carlos Vives ft. Sebastián Yatra
40	"It Ain't Me"	Kygo ft. Selena Gomez
41	"Me está tirando el rollo"	Banda los Recoditos
42	"Que se canse de llamar"	Los Plebes del Rancho de Ariel Camacho
43	"Es tuyo mi amor"	Banda MS
44	"Traicionera"	La Arrolladora Banda El Limón
45	"Corrido de Juanito"	Calibre 50
46	"3 A.M."	Jesse y Joy ft. Gente de Zona
47	"¿Por qué me enamoré?"	Ulises Chaidez y sus Plebes
48	"Esta noche se me olvida"	Julión Álvarez y su Norteño Banda
49	"Caricias clandestinas"	Remmy Valenzuela
50	"Me rehúso"	Danny Ocean
51	"Loco enamorado"	Remmy Valenzuela
52	"Vacaciones"	Wisin
53	"Shed a Light"	Robin Schulz ft. Cheat Codes & David Guetta
54	"Thunder"	Imagine Dragons
55	"No le hago falta"	Banda Los Recoditos
56	"Cuando un hombre te enamora"	Gloria Trevi & Alejandra Guzmán
57	"Vente pa' ca"	Ricky Martin ft. Maluma
58	"Culpable tú"	Alta Consigna
59	"No le hablen de amor"	CD9
60	"Symphony"	Clean Bandit ft. Zara Larsson
61	"Perro fiel"	Shakira ft. Nicky Jam
62	"Tengo que colgar"	Banda MS
63	"Sigo extrañándote"	J Balvin
64	"Vale la pena"	Banda el Recodo
65	"Lo digo"	Carlos Rivera ft. Gente de Zona
66	"That's What I Like"	Bruno Mars
67	"¿Qué me has hecho?"	Chayanne ft. Wisin
68	"Princesa"	Río Roma ft. CNCO
69	"La rompe corazones"	Daddy Yankee ft. Ozuna
70	"Casada o no"	Chuy Lizárraga y su Banda Tierra Sinaloense
71	"Bad Liar"	Selena Gomez
72	"Friends"	Justin Bieber & BloodPop
73	"Haz lo que quieras"	Alicia Villarreal
74	"Alguien robó"	Sebastián Yatra ft. Nacho ft. Wisin
75	"Swalla"	Jason Derulo ft. Nicki Minaj & Ty Dolla Sign
76	"I Feel So Bad"	Kungs ft. Ephemerals
77	"Optimista"	Caloncho
78	"Mi perdición"	Playa Limbo
79	"Mi buen amor"	Mon Laferte ft. Enrique Bunbury
80	"Wild Thoughts"	DJ Khaled ft. Bryson Tiller & Rihanna
81	"Tu sangre en mi cuerpo"	Ángela Aguilar ft. Pepe Aguilar
82	"Escápate conmigo"	Wisin ft. Ozuna
83	"Amor con hielo"	Morat
84	"Don't Wanna Know"	Maroon 5
85	"There's Nothing Holdin' Me Back"	Shawn Mendes
86	"El ataque de las chicas cocodrilo"	Aleks Syntek ft. David Summers Rodríguez
87	"Ayer y hoy"	Banda el Recodo
88	"Dentro de tu corazón"	Banda Los Sebastianes
89	"La sopa de tu propio chocolate"	Banda Rancho Viejo de Julio Aramburo
90	"¿Qué gano olvidándote?"	Reik
91	"Corazón roto"	La Arrolladora Banda El Limón
92	24K Magic"	Bruno Mars
93	"¿Cómo te atreves?"	Morat
94	"Feels"	Calvin Harris ft. Big Sean, Katy Perry & Pharrell Williams
95	"No digas nada"	Mario Bautista
96	"Paris"	The Chainsmokers
97	"Eres vida"	Duelo
98	"Báilame"	Nacho
99	"Oye Mujer"	Raymix
100	"El problema"	Alfredo Olivas

== See also ==
- List of number-one songs of 2017 (Mexico)
- List of number-one albums of 2017 (Mexico)
