= Frida (soundtrack) =

Soundtrack album by Elliot Goldenthal
- Released: October 22, 2002
- Recorded: 2002
- Genres: Latin; Avant-garde; Modernist; Progressive
- Length: 50:26
- Labels: Universal; 289 474 150-2
- Producer: Matthias Gohl

Elliot Goldenthal chronology
Final Fantasy: The Spirits Within (2001)	Frida (2002)	The Good Thief (2002)

Frida is the original soundtrack album, on the Universal label, of the 2002 Academy Award- and Golden Globe Award-winning film Frida starring Salma Hayek, Alfred Molina, Mía Maestro and Ashley Judd. The original score was composed by Elliot Goldenthal. The soundtrack features songs by various artists.

== The score ==
The album won both the Academy Award and the Golden Globe Award for Best Original Score. At the World Soundtrack Awards it won two awards: "Best Original Soundtrack of the Year" and "Soundtrack Composer of the Year".

In Frida, the approach I took scoring the music is that of melodic intimacy (scoring with melodies or tunes as opposed to motific fragments). To achieve additional intimacy I choose a small ensemble of acoustic instruments: the small Mexican guitar (Vihuela), standard classical guitar, Mexican bass guitar (guitarron), accordion, Mexican harp, marimba, and glass armonica (a Benjamin Franklin invention). I found that the guitars provided the full range of lyricism and percussion I needed.

Mexican music cannot be generalized, it varies greatly from one region to the next, but in its folkloric music there is a certain harmonic fingerprint, the use of consecutive thirds and a proud avoidance of over-complex harmonies. I found that if I adhered to this essential harmonic signature, and stayed very honest with my melodies, the movie invited me in. - Elliot Goldenthal

== Track listing ==
1. Benediction and Dream - Performed by Lila Downs (2:31)
2. The Floating Bed (1:29)
3. El Conejo - Performed by Cojolites (2:29)
4. Paloma Negra - Performed by Chavela Vargas (3:17)
5. Self-Portrait With Hair Down (1:09)
6. Alcoba Azul - Performed by Lila Downs (1:36)
7. Carabina 30/30 - Performed by El Poder del Norte (2:43)
8. Solo Tú (1:22)
9. El Gusto - Performed by Trio Huasteco Caimanes de Tamuin (2:18)
10. The Journey (2:56)
11. El Antifaz - Performed by Liberación, Miguel Galindo, Alejandro Matehuala, Gerardo García (2:28)
12. The Suicide of Dorothy Hale (0:48)
13. La Calavera (1:40)
14. La Bruja - Performed by Salma Hayek and Los Vega (1:57)
15. Portrait of Lupe (2:13)
16. La Llorona - Performed by Chavela Vargas (2:22)
17. Estrella Oscura - Performed by Lila Downs (1:48)
18. Still Life (1:31)
19. Viva la Vida - Performed by Trio / Marimberos (2:16)
20. The Departure (2:13)
21. Coyoacán and Variations (2:34)
22. La Llorona - Performed by Lila Downs & Mariachi Juvenil de Tecalitián (2:20)
23. Burning Bed (1:08)
24. Burn It Blue - Performed by Caetano Veloso and Lila Downs (7:58)

== Crew/Credit ==
- Music Composed by Elliot Goldenthal
- Music Produced by Teese Gohl and Elliot Goldenthal
- Orchestrated by Elliot Goldenthal and Robert Elhai
- Orchestra Conducted by Stephen Mercurio
- Recorded and Mixed by Joel Iwataki
- Electronic Music Produced by Richard Martinez
- Music Editor: Curtis Roush

== Certifications and sales ==
Region	Certification	Certified units/sales
Greece (IFPI Greece)	Gold	15,000^{^}
United States	—	223,000
^{^} Shipments figures based on certification alone.
