= Bebeto (disambiguation) =

Bebeto (born 1964) is a Brazilian politician and former football forward.

Bebeto may also refer to:

- Bebeto (footballer, born 1958), Polish football midfielder and manager Bogusław Baniak
- Bebeto (footballer, born 1990), Brazilian football right-back Roberto de Jesus Machado
- Bebeto Canhão, Brazilian football forward Alberto Vilasboas dos Reis (1946–2003)
- Bebeto de Freitas (1950–2018), Brazilian volleyball coach Paulo Roberto de Freitas
- Bara Bebeto (born 1991), Senegalese football forward Bara Mamadou Lamine Ndiaye
- El Bebeto (born 1989), Mexican singer Carlos Alberto García Villanueva
