= List of number-one songs of 2017 (Mexico) =

This is a list of the number-one songs of 2017 in Mexico. The airplay chart rankings are published by Monitor Latino, based on airplay across radio stations in Mexico using the Radio Tracking Data, LLC in real time. Charts are ranked from Monday to Sunday. Besides the General chart, Monitor Latino also publishes "Pop", "Popular" (Regional Mexican) and "Anglo" charts.

The streaming charts are published weekly by AMPROFON (Asociación Mexicana de Productores de Fonogramas y Videogramas).

== Chart history (Airplay) ==
=== General ===
In 2017, thirteen songs reached number one on the General chart (fifteen if the remix versions of "Despacito" and "Mi gente" are counted as separate songs). Of these, eleven songs were entirely or mostly in Spanish, and two were primarily in English. Nine acts achieved their first number-one song in Mexico: Clean Bandit, Sean Paul, Anne-Marie, Christian Nodal, Willy William, Beyoncé, Nicky Jam, Camila Cabello, Young Thug and Nego do Borel.

"Corazón" by Maluma ft. Nego do Borel was the first No. 1 song to feature Portuguese lyrics since the General chart was founded.

"Despacito" by Luis Fonsi ft. Daddy Yankee was the best performing song of the year.

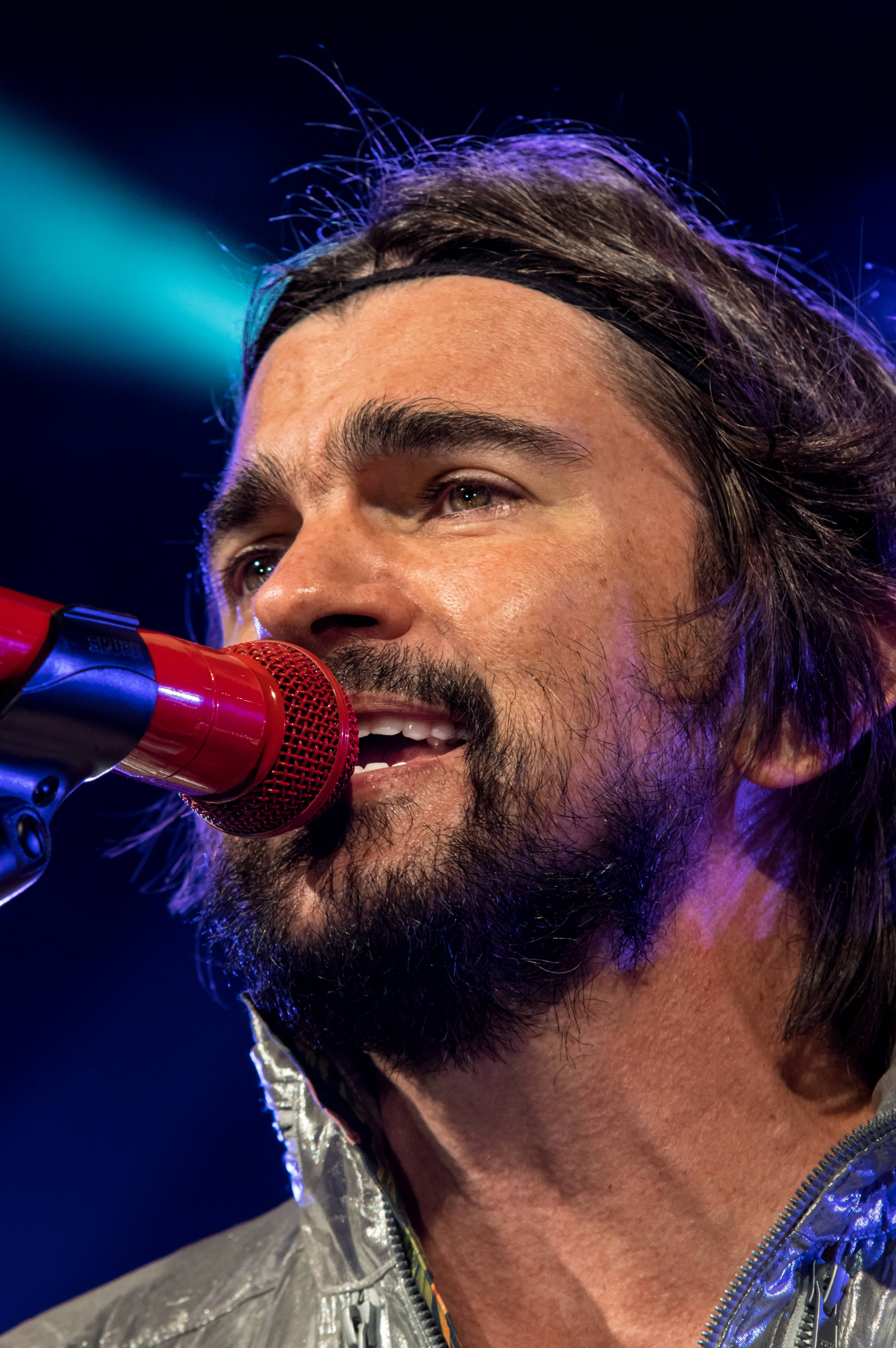
Colombian singer-songwriter Juanes (pictured) earned his third No. 1 General song with "Fuego".

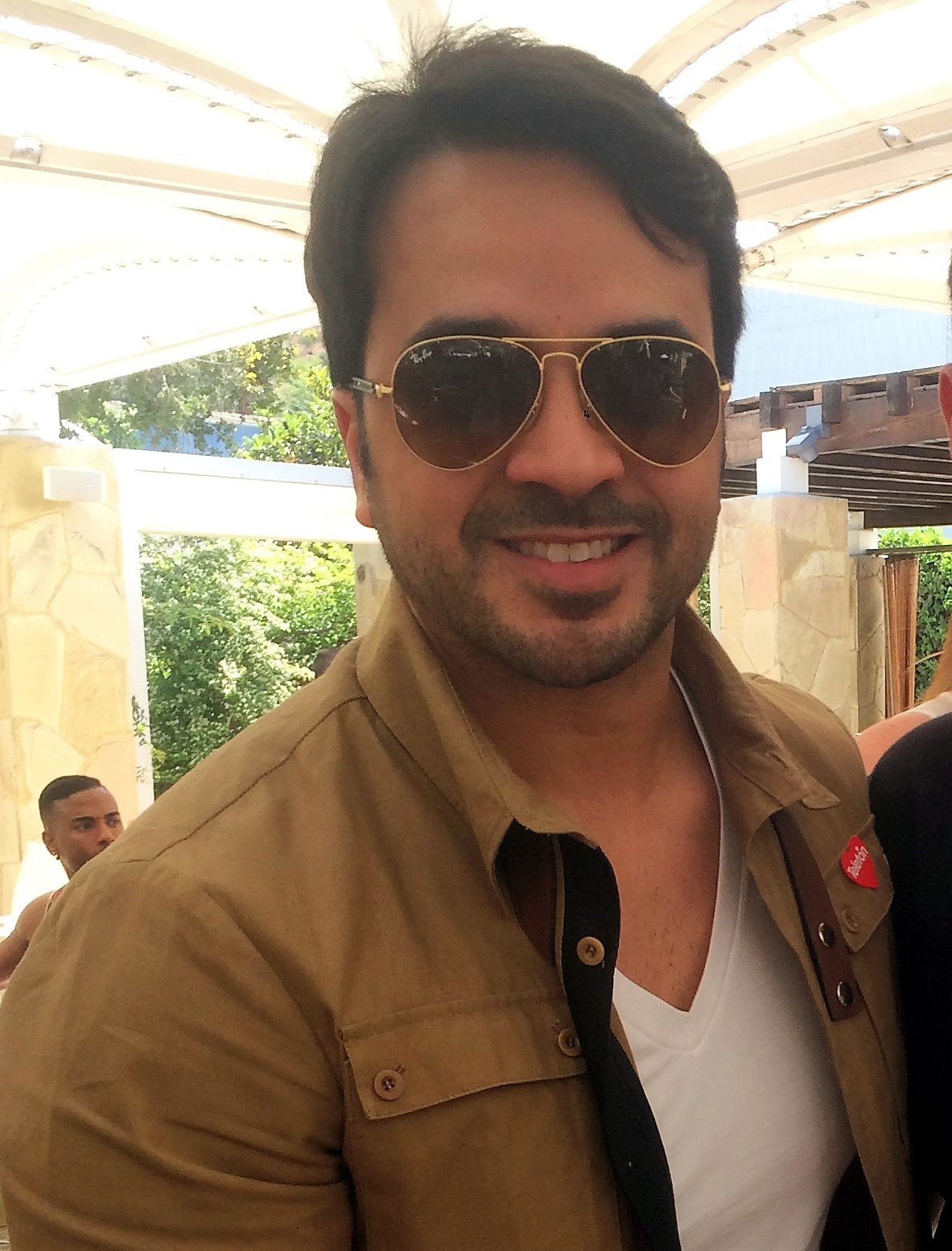
Puerto Rican singer-songwriter Luis Fonsi (pictured) earned his second No. 1 General song (and the first since 2008) with "Despacito".

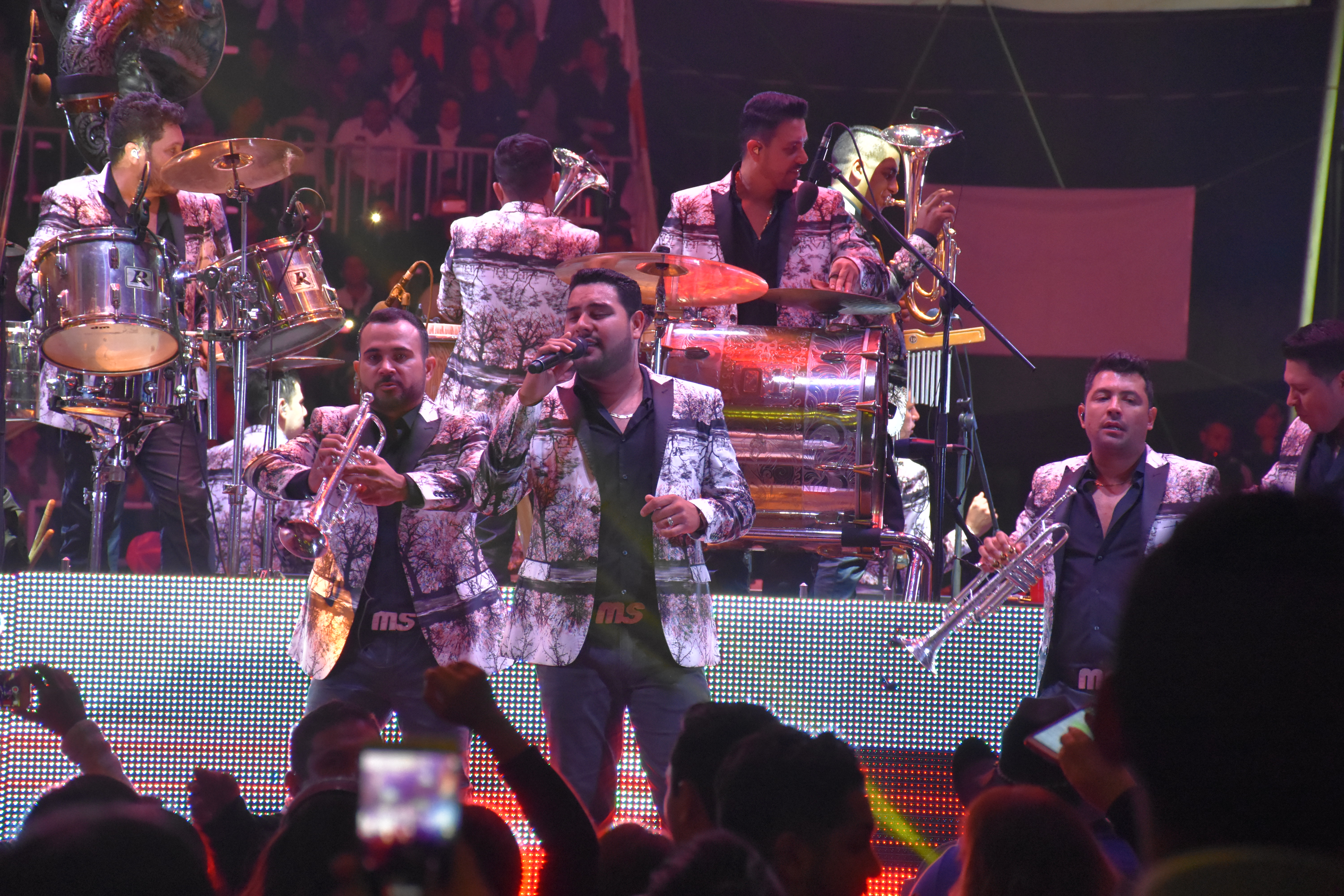
Mexican ensemble Banda MS (pictured) earned their sixth No. 1 General song with "El color de tus ojos".

The yellow background indicates the best-performing song of 2017.

Issue Date	Audience		Spins		Ref.
January 1	"Fuego"	Juanes	"Quiero que vuelvas"	Alejandro Fernández	
January 8	"Siempre te voy a querer"	Calibre 50	"Siempre te voy a querer"	Calibre 50	
January 15	"Rockabye"	Clean Bandit ft. Sean Paul & Anne-Marie	"Siempre te voy a querer"	Calibre 50	
January 22	"Siempre te voy a querer"	Calibre 50	"Siempre te voy a querer"	Calibre 50	
January 29	"Siempre te voy a querer"	Calibre 50	"Siempre te voy a querer"	Calibre 50	
February 5	"Siempre te voy a querer"	Calibre 50	"Siempre te voy a querer"	Calibre 50	
February 12	"Siempre te voy a querer"	Calibre 50	"Despacito"	Luis Fonsi ft. Daddy Yankee	
February 19	"Despacito"	Luis Fonsi ft. Daddy Yankee	"Despacito"	Luis Fonsi ft. Daddy Yankee	
February 26	"Despacito"	Luis Fonsi ft. Daddy Yankee	"Despacito"	Luis Fonsi ft. Daddy Yankee	
March 5	"Despacito"	Luis Fonsi ft. Daddy Yankee	"Despacito"	Luis Fonsi ft. Daddy Yankee	
March 12	"Adiós Amor"	Christian Nodal	"Despacito"	Luis Fonsi ft. Daddy Yankee	
March 19	"Despacito"	Luis Fonsi ft. Daddy Yankee	"Despacito"	Luis Fonsi ft. Daddy Yankee	
March 26	"Adiós amor"	Christian Nodal	"Despacito"	Luis Fonsi ft. Daddy Yankee	
April 2	"Adiós amor"	Christian Nodal	"Despacito"	Luis Fonsi ft. Daddy Yankee	
April 9	"Despacito"	Luis Fonsi ft. Daddy Yankee	"Despacito"	Luis Fonsi ft. Daddy Yankee	
April 16	"Despacito"	Luis Fonsi ft. Daddy Yankee	"Despacito"	Luis Fonsi ft. Daddy Yankee	
April 23	"Despacito"	Luis Fonsi ft. Daddy Yankee	"Despacito"	Luis Fonsi ft. Daddy Yankee	
April 30	"Despacito"	Luis Fonsi ft. Daddy Yankee & Justin Bieber	"Despacito"	Luis Fonsi ft. Daddy Yankee & Justin Bieber	
May 7	"Despacito"	Luis Fonsi ft. Daddy Yankee & Justin Bieber	"Despacito"	Luis Fonsi ft. Daddy Yankee & Justin Bieber	
May 14	"Despacito"	Luis Fonsi ft. Daddy Yankee & Justin Bieber	"Despacito"	Luis Fonsi ft. Daddy Yankee & Justin Bieber	
May 21	"Despacito"	Luis Fonsi ft. Daddy Yankee & Justin Bieber	"Despacito"	Luis Fonsi ft. Daddy Yankee & Justin Bieber	
May 28	"Despacito"	Luis Fonsi ft. Daddy Yankee & Justin Bieber	"Despacito"	Luis Fonsi ft. Daddy Yankee & Justin Bieber	
June 4	"Despacito"	Luis Fonsi ft. Daddy Yankee & Justin Bieber	"Despacito"	Luis Fonsi ft. Daddy Yankee & Justin Bieber	
June 11	"Despacito"	Luis Fonsi ft. Daddy Yankee & Justin Bieber	"Despacito"	Luis Fonsi ft. Daddy Yankee & Justin Bieber	
June 18	"Despacito"	Luis Fonsi ft. Daddy Yankee & Justin Bieber	"Las Ultras"	Calibre 50	
June 25	"Despacito"	Luis Fonsi ft. Daddy Yankee & Justin Bieber	"Las Ultras"	Calibre 50	
July 2	"Felices los 4"	Maluma	"Las Ultras"	Calibre 50	
July 9	"Felices los 4"	Maluma	"En definitiva"	Alfredo Olivas	
July 16	"Felices los 4"	Maluma	"En definitiva"	Alfredo Olivas	
July 23	"Felices los 4"	Maluma	"Casada o no"	Chuy Lizárraga y su Banda Tierra Sinaloense	
July 30	"Felices los 4"	Maluma	"Mi gente"	J Balvin ft. Willy William	
August 6	"Mi gente"	J Balvin ft. Willy William	"Mi gente"	J Balvin ft. Willy William	
August 13	"Mi gente"	J Balvin ft. Willy William	"Mi gente"	J Balvin ft. Willy William	
August 20	"Mi gente"	J Balvin ft. Willy William	"Probablemente"	Christian Nodal ft. David Bisbal	
August 27	"Mi gente"	J Balvin ft. Willy William	"Probablemente"	Christian Nodal ft. David Bisbal	
September 3	"Mi gente"	J Balvin ft. Willy William	"Probablemente"	Christian Nodal ft. David Bisbal	
September 10	"Mi gente"	J Balvin ft. Willy William	"Probablemente"	Christian Nodal ft. David Bisbal	
September 17	"Mi gente"	J Balvin ft. Willy William	"Mi gente"	J Balvin ft. Willy William	
September 24	"Mi gente"	J Balvin ft. Willy William	"Mi gente"	J Balvin ft. Willy William	
October 1	"Mi gente"	J Balvin ft. Willy William & Beyoncé	"Mi gente"	J Balvin ft. Willy William & Beyoncé	
October 8	"Mi gente"	J Balvin ft. Willy William & Beyoncé	"Mi gente"	J Balvin ft. Willy William & Beyoncé	
October 15	"Mi gente"	J Balvin ft. Willy William & Beyoncé	"El color de tus ojos"	Banda MS	
October 22	"Perro Fiel"	Shakira ft. Nicky Jam	"Loco enamorado"	Remmy Valenzuela	
October 29	"El color de tus ojos"	Banda MS	"Loco enamorado"	Remmy Valenzuela	
November 5	"El color de tus ojos"	Banda MS	"Corrido de Juanito"	Calibre 50	
November 12	"El color de tus ojos"	Banda MS	"En vida"	Banda Los Sebastianes	
November 19	"Perro fiel"	Shakira ft. Nicky Jam	"En vida"	Banda Los Sebastianes	
November 26	"Corrido de Juanito"	Calibre 50	"Será que estoy enamorado"	Los Plebes del Rancho de Ariel Camacho	
December 3	"Havana"	Camila Cabello ft. Young Thug	"Será que estoy enamorado"	Los Plebes del Rancho de Ariel Camacho	
December 10	"Seremos"	El Bebeto	"Seremos"	El Bebeto	
December 17	"Corazón"	Maluma ft. Nego do Borel	"Seremos"	El Bebeto	
December 24	"Corazón"	Maluma ft. Nego do Borel	"Seremos"	El Bebeto	
December 31	"Corazón"	Maluma ft. Nego do Borel	"Seremos"	El Bebeto	

=== Pop ===
Issue Date	Song (Audience)	Song (Spins)	Ref.
January 1	"Reggaetón Lento (Bailemos)"^{CNCO}	"Vente pa' cá"^{Ricky Martin ft. Maluma}	
January 8	"Reggaetón Lento (Bailemos)"^{CNCO}	"Chantaje"^{Shakira ft. Maluma}	
January 15	"Chantaje"^{Shakira ft. Maluma}	"Chantaje"^{Shakira ft. Maluma}	
January 22	"Chantaje"^{Shakira ft. Maluma}	"Chantaje"^{Shakira ft. Maluma}	
January 29	"Chantaje"^{Shakira ft. Maluma}	"Chantaje"^{Shakira ft. Maluma}	
February 5	"Reggaetón lento (Bailemos)"^{CNCO}	"Despacito"^{Luis Fonsi ft. Daddy Yankee}	
February 12	"Chantaje"^{Shakira ft. Maluma}	"Despacito"^{Luis Fonsi ft. Daddy Yankee}	
February 19	"Despacito"^{Luis Fonsi ft. Daddy Yankee}	"Despacito"^{Luis Fonsi ft. Daddy Yankee}	
February 26	"Despacito"^{Luis Fonsi ft. Daddy Yankee}	"Despacito"^{Luis Fonsi ft. Daddy Yankee}	
March 5	"Despacito"^{Luis Fonsi ft. Daddy Yankee}	"Despacito"^{Luis Fonsi ft. Daddy Yankee}	
March 12	"Despacito"^{Luis Fonsi ft. Daddy Yankee}	"Despacito"^{Luis Fonsi ft. Daddy Yankee}	
March 19	"Despacito"^{Luis Fonsi ft. Daddy Yankee}	"Despacito"^{Luis Fonsi ft. Daddy Yankee}	
March 26	"Despacito"^{Luis Fonsi ft. Daddy Yankee}	"Despacito"^{Luis Fonsi ft. Daddy Yankee}	
April 2	"Súbeme la Radio"^{Enrique Iglesias ft. Descemer Bueno y Zion & Lennox}	"Despacito"^{Luis Fonsi ft. Daddy Yankee}	
April 9	"Despacito"^{Luis Fonsi ft. Daddy Yankee}	"Despacito"^{Luis Fonsi ft. Daddy Yankee}	
April 16	"Despacito"^{Luis Fonsi ft. Daddy Yankee}	"Despacito"^{Luis Fonsi ft. Daddy Yankee}	
April 23	"Despacito"^{Luis Fonsi ft. Daddy Yankee}	"Despacito"^{Luis Fonsi ft. Daddy Yankee}	
April 30	"Despacito"^{Luis Fonsi ft. Daddy Yankee & Justin Bieber}	"Despacito"^{Luis Fonsi ft. Daddy Yankee & Justin Bieber}	
May 7	"Despacito"^{Luis Fonsi ft. Daddy Yankee & Justin Bieber}	"Despacito"^{Luis Fonsi ft. Daddy Yankee & Justin Bieber}	
May 14	"Despacito"^{Luis Fonsi ft. Daddy Yankee & Justin Bieber}	"Despacito"^{Luis Fonsi ft. Daddy Yankee & Justin Bieber}	
May 21	"Despacito"^{Luis Fonsi ft. Daddy Yankee & Justin Bieber}	"Despacito"^{Luis Fonsi ft. Daddy Yankee & Justin Bieber}	
May 28	"Despacito"^{Luis Fonsi ft. Daddy Yankee & Justin Bieber}	"Despacito"^{Luis Fonsi ft. Daddy Yankee & Justin Bieber}	
June 4	"Despacito"^{Luis Fonsi ft. Daddy Yankee & Justin Bieber}	"Despacito"^{Luis Fonsi ft. Daddy Yankee & Justin Bieber}	
June 11	"Despacito"^{Luis Fonsi ft. Daddy Yankee & Justin Bieber}	"Despacito"^{Luis Fonsi ft. Daddy Yankee & Justin Bieber}	
June 18	"Me enamoré"^{Shakira}	"Despacito"^{Luis Fonsi ft. Daddy Yankee & Justin Bieber}	
June 25	"Me enamoré"^{Shakira}	"Cuando un hombre te enamora"^{Gloria Trevi ft. Alejandra Guzmán}	
July 2	"Me enamoré"^{Shakira}	"Cuando un hombre te enamora"^{Gloria Trevi ft. Alejandra Guzmán}	
July 9	"Me enamoré"^{Shakira}	"Cuando un hombre te enamora"^{Gloria Trevi ft. Alejandra Guzmán}	
July 16	"Me enamoré"^{Shakira}	"Mi gente"^{J Balvin & Willy William}	
July 23	"Me enamoré"^{Shakira}	"Mi gente"^{J Balvin & Willy William}	
July 30	"Mi gente"^{J Balvin & Willy William}	"Mi gente"^{J Balvin & Willy William}	
August 6	"Mi gente"^{J Balvin & Willy William}	"Mi gente"^{J Balvin & Willy William}	
August 13	"Mi gente"^{J Balvin & Willy William}	"Mi gente"^{J Balvin & Willy William}	
August 20	"Mi gente"^{J Balvin & Willy William}	"Mi gente"^{J Balvin & Willy William}	
August 27	"Mi gente"^{J Balvin & Willy William}	"Mi gente"^{J Balvin & Willy William}	
September 3	"Mi gente"^{J Balvin & Willy William}	"Mi gente"^{J Balvin & Willy William}	
September 10	"Mi gente"^{J Balvin & Willy William}	"Mi gente"^{J Balvin & Willy William}	
September 17	"Mi gente"^{J Balvin & Willy William}	"Mi gente"^{J Balvin & Willy William}	
September 24	"Mi gente"^{J Balvin & Willy William}	"Mi gente"^{J Balvin & Willy William}	
October 1	"Mi gente"^{J Balvin ft. Willy William & Beyonce}	"Mi gente"^{J Balvin ft. Willy William & Beyonce}	
October 8	"Perro Fiel"^{Shakira ft. Nicky Jam}	"Mi gente"^{J Balvin ft. Willy William & Beyonce}	
October 15	"3 A.M."^{Jesse y Joy ft. Gente de Zona}	"Mi gente"^{J Balvin ft. Willy William & Beyonce}	
October 22	"Perro fiel"^{Shakira ft. Nicky Jam}	"Mi gente"^{J Balvin ft. Willy William & Beyonce}	
October 29	"Perro fiel"^{Shakira ft. Nicky Jam}	"Mi gente"^{J Balvin ft. Willy William & Beyonce}	
November 5	"Perro fiel"^{Shakira ft. Nicky Jam}	"Perro fiel"^{Shakira ft. Nicky Jam}	
November 12	"Perro fiel"^{Shakira ft. Nicky Jam}	"Perro fiel"^{Shakira ft. Nicky Jam}	
November 19	"Perro fiel"^{Shakira ft. Nicky Jam}	"Perro fiel"^{Shakira ft. Nicky Jam}	
November 26	"100 años"^{Ha*Ash ft. Prince Royce}	"Primaveral"^{Mon Laferte}	
December 3	"100 años"^{Ha*Ash ft. Prince Royce}	"Primaveral"^{Mon Laferte}	
December 10	"100 años"^{Ha*Ash ft. Prince Royce}	"Primaveral"^{Mon Laferte}	
December 17	"100 años"^{Ha*Ash ft. Prince Royce}	"Primaveral"^{Mon Laferte}	
December 24	"Corazón"^{Maluma ft. Nego do Borel}	"Échame la Culpa"^{Luis Fonsi ft. Demi Lovato}	
December 31	"Corazón"^{Maluma ft. Nego do Borel}	"Échame la Culpa"^{Luis Fonsi ft. Demi Lovato}	

=== Popular ===
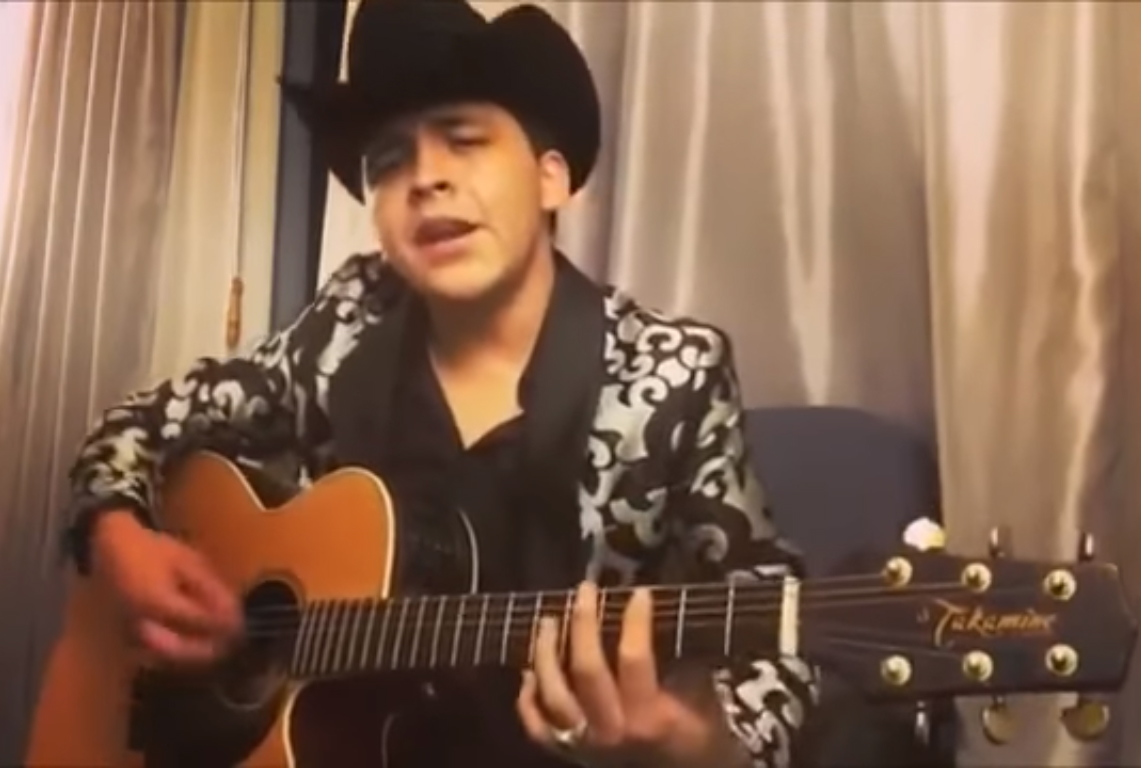
"Adiós amor" by Mexican singer Christian Nodal (pictured) was the best-performing Popular song of 2017.

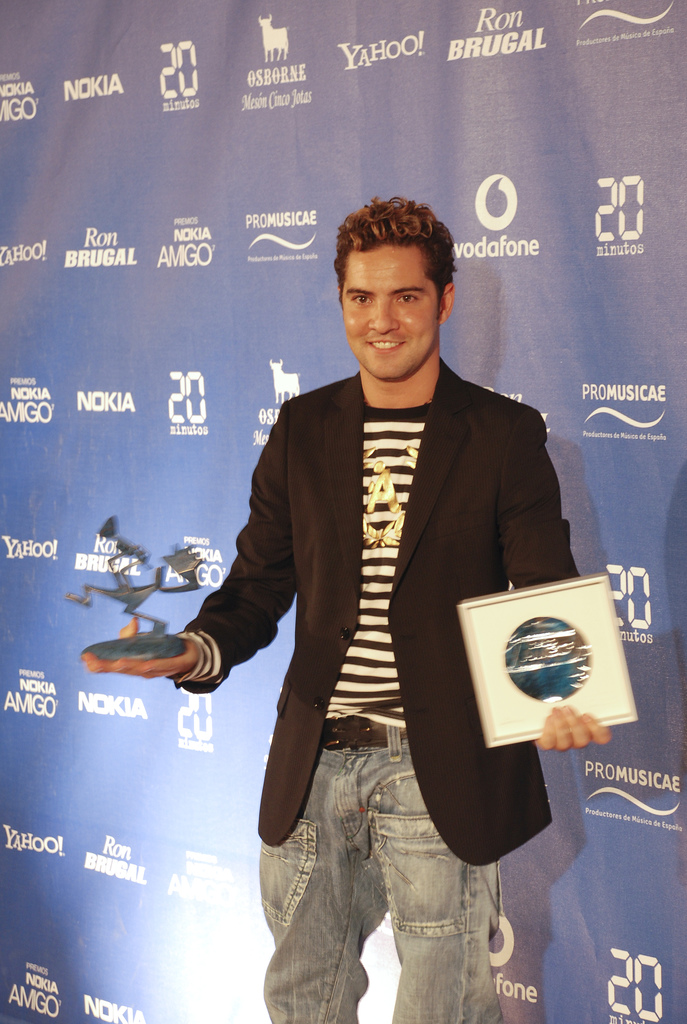
David Bisbal (pictured) became the first Spaniard to top the Popular chart, as a featured artist on the song "Probablemente".

Issue Date	Song (Audience)	Song (Spins)	Ref.
January 1	"Por enamorarme"^{Los Plebes del Rancho de Ariel Camacho}	"Siempre te voy a querer"^{Calibre 50}	
January 8	"Siempre te voy a querer"^{Calibre 50}	"Siempre te voy a querer"^{Calibre 50}	
January 15	"Siempre te voy a querer"^{Calibre 50}	"Siempre te voy a querer"^{Calibre 50}	
January 22	"Siempre te voy a querer"^{Calibre 50}	"Siempre te voy a querer"^{Calibre 50}	
January 29	"Siempre te voy a querer"^{Calibre 50}	"Siempre te voy a querer"^{Calibre 50}	
February 5	"Siempre te voy a querer"^{Calibre 50}	"Siempre te voy a querer"^{Calibre 50}	
February 12	"Siempre te voy a querer"^{Calibre 50}	"Adiós amor"^{Christian Nodal}	
February 19	"Siempre te voy a querer"^{Calibre 50}	"Adiós amor"^{Christian Nodal}	
February 26	"Adiós amor"^{Christian Nodal}	"Adiós amor"^{Christian Nodal}	
March 5	"Adiós amor"^{Christian Nodal}	"Adiós amor"^{Christian Nodal}	
March 12	"Adiós amor"^{Christian Nodal}	"Durmiendo en el lugar equivocado"^{La Adictiva Banda San José de Mesillas}	
March 19	"Adiós amor"^{Christian Nodal}	"Durmiendo en el lugar equivocado"^{La Adictiva Banda San José de Mesillas}	
March 26	"Adiós amor"^{Christian Nodal}	"Durmiendo en el lugar equivocado"^{La Adictiva Banda San José de Mesillas}	
April 2	"Adiós amor"^{Christian Nodal}	"Que se canse de llamar"^{Los Plebes del Rancho de Ariel Camacho}	
April 9	"Adiós amor"^{Christian Nodal}	"Que se canse de llamar"^{Los Plebes del Rancho de Ariel Camacho}	
April 16	"Adiós amor"^{Christian Nodal}	"Que se canse de llamar"^{Los Plebes del Rancho de Ariel Camacho}	
April 23	"Durmiendo en el lugar equivocado"^{La Adictiva Banda San José de Mesillas}	"Que se canse de llamar"^{Los Plebes del Rancho de Ariel Camacho}	
April 30	"Durmiendo en el lugar equivocado"^{La Adictiva Banda San José de Mesillas}	"Que se canse de llamar"^{Los Plebes del Rancho de Ariel Camacho}	
May 7	"Durmiendo en el lugar equivocado"^{La Adictiva Banda San José de Mesillas}	"Que se canse de llamar"^{Los Plebes del Rancho de Ariel Camacho}	
May 14	"Durmiendo en el lugar equivocado"^{La Adictiva Banda San José de Mesillas}	"Que se canse de llamar"^{Los Plebes del Rancho de Ariel Camacho}	
May 21	"Durmiendo en el lugar equivocado"^{La Adictiva Banda San José de Mesillas}	"Las Ultras"^{Calibre 50}	
May 28	"Durmiendo en el lugar equivocado"^{La Adictiva Banda San José de Mesillas}	"Esta noche se me olvida"^{Julión Álvarez y su Norteño Banda}	
June 4	"Durmiendo en el lugar equivocado"^{La Adictiva Banda San José de Mesillas}	"Las Ultras"^{Calibre 50}	
June 11	"¿Para qué lastimarme?"^{Gerardo Ortiz}	"Las Ultras"^{Calibre 50}	
June 18	"Ojalá que me olvides"^{La Arrolladora Banda El Limón}	"Las Ultras"^{Calibre 50}	
June 25	"Las Ultras"^{Calibre 50}	"Las Ultras"^{Calibre 50}	
July 2	"Las Ultras"^{Calibre 50}	"Las Ultras"^{Calibre 50}	
July 9	"En definitiva"^{Alfredo Olivas}	"En definitiva"^{Alfredo Olivas}	
July 16	"Las Ultras"^{Calibre 50}	"En definitiva"^{Alfredo Olivas}	
July 23	"Las Ultras"^{Calibre 50}	"Casada o no"^{Chuy Lizárraga y su Banda Tierra Sinaloense}	
July 30	"Las Ultras"^{Calibre 50}	"En definitiva"^{Alfredo Olivas}	
August 6	"En definitiva"^{Alfredo Olivas}	"La princesa"^{La Adictiva Banda San José de Mesillas}	
August 13	"La princesa"^{La Adictiva Banda San José de Mesillas}	"Probablemente"^{Christian Nodal ft. David Bisbal}	
August 20	"Probablemente"^{Christian Nodal ft. David Bisbal}	"Probablemente"^{Christian Nodal ft. David Bisbal}	
August 27	"La princesa"^{La Adictiva Banda San José de Mesillas}	"Probablemente"^{Christian Nodal ft. David Bisbal}	
September 3	"La princesa"^{La Adictiva Banda San José de Mesillas}	"Probablemente"^{Christian Nodal ft. David Bisbal}	
September 10	"La princesa"^{La Adictiva Banda San José de Mesillas}	"Probablemente"^{Christian Nodal ft. David Bisbal}	
September 17	"El color de tus ojos"^{Banda MS}	"Haz lo que quieras"^{Alicia Villarreal}	
September 24	"El color de tus ojos"^{Banda MS}	"El color de tus ojos"^{Banda MS}	
October 1	"El color de tus ojos"^{Banda MS}	"Loco enamorado"^{Remmy Valenzuela}	
October 8	"El color de tus ojos"^{Banda MS}	"Loco enamorado"^{Remmy Valenzuela}	
October 15	"El color de tus ojos"^{Banda MS}	"El color de tus ojos"^{Banda MS}	
October 22	"El color de tus ojos"^{Banda MS}	"Loco enamorado"^{Remmy Valenzuela}	
October 29	"El color de tus ojos"^{Banda MS}	"Loco enamorado"^{Remmy Valenzuela}	
November 5	"El color de tus ojos"^{Banda MS}	"Corrido de Juanito"^{Calibre 50}	
November 12	"El color de tus ojos"^{Banda MS}	"En vida"^{Banda Los Sebastianes}	
November 19	"El problema"^{Alfredo Olivas}	"En vida"^{Banda Los Sebastianes}	
November 26	"Corrido de Juanito"^{Calibre 50}	"Será que estoy enamorado"^{Los Plebes del Rancho de Ariel Camacho}	
December 3	"El color de tus ojos"^{Banda MS}	"Será que estoy enamorado"^{Los Plebes del Rancho de Ariel Camacho}	
December 10	"Seremos"^{El Bebeto}	"Seremos"^{El Bebeto}	
December 17	"Seremos"^{El Bebeto}	"Será que estoy enamorado"^{Los Plebes del Rancho de Ariel Camacho}	
December 24	"Entre beso y beso"^{La Arrolladora Banda El Limón}	"Seremos"^{El Bebeto}	
December 31	"Entre beso y beso"^{La Arrolladora Banda El Limón}	"Seremos"^{El Bebeto}	

=== Anglo ===
Issue Date	Song (Audience)	Song (Spins)	Ref.
January 1	"Rockabye"^{Clean Bandit ft. Anne-Marie & Sean Paul}	"24K Magic"^{Bruno Mars}	
January 8	"Rockabye"^{Clean Bandit ft. Anne-Marie & Sean Paul}	"Rockabye"^{Clean Bandit ft. Anne-Marie & Sean Paul}	
January 15	"Rockabye"^{Clean Bandit ft. Anne-Marie & Sean Paul}	"Rockabye"^{Clean Bandit ft. Anne-Marie & Sean Paul}	
January 22	"Rockabye"^{Clean Bandit ft. Anne-Marie & Sean Paul}	"Rockabye"^{Clean Bandit ft. Anne-Marie & Sean Paul}	
January 29	"Rockabye"^{Clean Bandit ft. Anne-Marie & Sean Paul}	"Rockabye"^{Clean Bandit ft. Anne-Marie & Sean Paul}	
February 5	"Rockabye"^{Clean Bandit ft. Anne-Marie & Sean Paul}	"Rockabye"^{Clean Bandit ft. Anne-Marie & Sean Paul}	
February 12	"Rockabye"^{Clean Bandit ft. Anne-Marie & Sean Paul}	"Rockabye"^{Clean Bandit ft. Anne-Marie & Sean Paul}	
February 19	"Shape of You"^{Ed Sheeran}	"Shape of You"^{Ed Sheeran}	
February 26	"Shape of You"^{Ed Sheeran}	"Shape of You"^{Ed Sheeran}	
March 5	"Shape of You"^{Ed Sheeran}	"Shape of You"^{Ed Sheeran}	
March 12	"Shape of You"^{Ed Sheeran}	"Shape of You"^{Ed Sheeran}	
March 19	"Shape of You"^{Ed Sheeran}	"Shape of You"^{Ed Sheeran}	
March 26	"Shape of You"^{Ed Sheeran}	"Shape of You"^{Ed Sheeran}	
April 2	"Something Just like This"^{The Chainsmokers ft. Coldplay}	"Shape of You"^{Ed Sheeran}	
April 9	"Something Just like This"^{The Chainsmokers ft. Coldplay}	"Shape of You"^{Ed Sheeran}	
April 16	"Something Just like This"^{The Chainsmokers ft. Coldplay}	"Shape of You"^{Ed Sheeran}	
April 23	"Something Just like This"^{The Chainsmokers ft. Coldplay}	"Shape of You"^{Ed Sheeran}	
April 30	"Something Just like This"^{The Chainsmokers ft. Coldplay}	"Something Just like This"^{The Chainsmokers ft. Coldplay}	
May 7	"Something Just like This"^{The Chainsmokers ft. Coldplay}	"Something Just like This"^{The Chainsmokers ft. Coldplay}	
May 14	"Something Just like This"^{The Chainsmokers ft. Coldplay}	"Something Just like This"^{The Chainsmokers ft. Coldplay}	
May 21	"Sign of the Times"^{Harry Styles}	"Something Just like This"^{The Chainsmokers ft. Coldplay}	
May 28	"Sign of the Times"^{Harry Styles}	"Sign of the Times"^{Harry Styles}	
June 4	"Sign of the Times"^{Harry Styles}	"Sign of the Times"^{Harry Styles}	
June 11	"Sign of the Times"^{Harry Styles}	"Sign of the Times"^{Harry Styles}	
June 18	"Be Mine"^{Ofenbach}	"Sign of the Times"^{Harry Styles}	
June 25	"Be Mine"^{Ofenbach}	"Sign of the Times"^{Harry Styles}	
July 2	"Be Mine"^{Ofenbach}	"Sign of the Times"^{Harry Styles}	
July 9	"Be Mine"^{Ofenbach}	"Be Mine"^{Ofenbach}	
July 16	"Attention"^{Charlie Puth}	"Attention"^{Charlie Puth}	
July 23	"Attention"^{Charlie Puth}	"Attention"^{Charlie Puth}	
July 30	"Attention"^{Charlie Puth}	"Attention"^{Charlie Puth}	
August 6	"Attention"^{Charlie Puth}	"Attention"^{Charlie Puth}	
August 13	"Attention"^{Charlie Puth}	"Attention"^{Charlie Puth}	
August 20	"Attention"^{Charlie Puth}	"Attention"^{Charlie Puth}	
August 27	"Feel It Still"^{Portugal. The Man}	"Attention"^{Charlie Puth}	
September 3	"Feel It Still"^{Portugal. The Man}	"Attention"^{Charlie Puth}	
September 10	"Wild Thoughts"^{DJ Khaled ft. Bryson Tiller & Rihanna}	"Attention"^{Charlie Puth}	
September 17	"Feel It Still"^{Portugal. The Man}	"Wild Thoughts"^{DJ Khaled ft. Bryson Tiller & Rihanna}	
September 24	"Feel It Still"^{Portugal. The Man}	"Friends"^{Justin Bieber ft. BloodPop}	
October 1	"Feel It Still"^{Portugal. The Man}	"Friends"^{Justin Bieber ft. BloodPop}	
October 8	"Feel It Still"^{Portugal. The Man}	"Look What You Made Me Do"^{Taylor Swift}	
October 15	"Friends"^{Justin Bieber ft. BloodPop}	"Look What You Made Me Do"^{Taylor Swift}	
October 22	"Feel It Still"^{Portugal. The Man}	"Feel It Still"^{Portugal. The Man}	
October 29	"Feel It Still"^{Portugal. The Man}	"Feel It Still"^{Portugal. The Man}	
November 5	"Feel It Still"^{Portugal. The Man}	"Feel It Still"^{Portugal. The Man}	
November 12	"Havana"^{Camila Cabello ft. Young Thug}	"What Lovers Do"^{Maroon 5 ft. SZA}	
November 19	"Havana"^{Camila Cabello ft. Young Thug}	"Havana"^{Camila Cabello ft. Young Thug}	
November 26	"Havana"^{Camila Cabello ft. Young Thug}	"Havana"^{Camila Cabello ft. Young Thug}	
December 3	"Havana"^{Camila Cabello ft. Young Thug}	"Havana"^{Camila Cabello ft. Young Thug}	
December 10	"Havana"^{Camila Cabello ft. Young Thug}	"Havana"^{Camila Cabello ft. Young Thug}	
December 17	"Havana"^{Camila Cabello ft. Young Thug}	"Havana"^{Camila Cabello ft. Young Thug}	
December 24	"Havana"^{Camila Cabello ft. Young Thug}	"Havana"^{Camila Cabello ft. Young Thug}	
December 31	"Havana"^{Camila Cabello ft. Young Thug}	"Havana"^{Camila Cabello ft. Young Thug}	

== Chart history (Streaming) ==
In 2017, nine songs have reached number one on the Streaming chart; all of these songs were entirely in Spanish.

Venezuelan singer Danny Ocean was the first independent musician to have a number-one song.

The yellow background indicates the best-performing song of 2017.

Issue date	Song	Artist(s)	Ref.
January 5	"Chantaje"	Shakira ft. Maluma	
January 19	"Chantaje"	Shakira ft. Maluma	
February 2	"Chantaje"	Shakira ft. Maluma	
February 9	"Despacito"	Luis Fonsi ft. Daddy Yankee	
February 16	"Despacito"	Luis Fonsi ft. Daddy Yankee	
February 23	"Despacito"	Luis Fonsi ft. Daddy Yankee	
March 2	"Despacito"	Luis Fonsi ft. Daddy Yankee	
March 9	"Despacito"	Luis Fonsi ft. Daddy Yankee	
March 16	"Despacito"	Luis Fonsi ft. Daddy Yankee	
March 23	"Despacito"	Luis Fonsi ft. Daddy Yankee	
March 30	"Despacito"	Luis Fonsi ft. Daddy Yankee	
April 6	"Despacito"	Luis Fonsi ft. Daddy Yankee	
April 13	"Despacito"	Luis Fonsi ft. Daddy Yankee	
April 20	"Despacito"	Luis Fonsi ft. Daddy Yankee	
April 27	"Me Rehúso"	Danny Ocean	
May 4	"Felices los 4"	Maluma	
May 11	"Felices los 4"	Maluma	
May 18	"Felices los 4"	Maluma	
May 25	"Felices los 4"	Maluma	
June 1	"Felices los 4"	Maluma	
June 8	"Felices los 4"	Maluma	
June 15	"Felices los 4"	Maluma	
June 22	"Felices los 4"	Maluma	
June 29	"Felices los 4"	Maluma	
July 6	"Felices los 4"	Maluma	
July 13	"Una lady como tú"	Manuel Turizo	
July 20	"Una lady como tú"	Manuel Turizo	
July 27	"Mi gente"	J Balvin ft. Willy William	
August 3	"Mi gente"	J Balvin ft. Willy William	
August 10	"Mi gente"	J Balvin ft. Willy William	
August 17	"Mi gente"	J Balvin ft. Willy William	
August 24	"Mi gente"	J Balvin ft. Willy William	
September 7	"Una lady como tú"	Manuel Turizo	
September 14	"Una lady como tú"	Manuel Turizo	
September 21	"Una lady como tú"	Manuel Turizo	
September 28	"Mi gente"	J Balvin ft. Willy William	
October 5	"Bonita"	J Balvin ft. Jowell & Randy	
October 19	"Se preparó"	Ozuna	
October 26	"Se preparó"	Ozuna	
November 2	"Se preparó"	Ozuna	
November 9	"Criminal"	Natti Natasha ft. Ozuna	
November 16	"Criminal"	Natti Natasha ft. Ozuna	
December 18	"Corazón"	Maluma ft. Nego do Borel	

== See also ==
- List of Top 100 songs for 2017 in Mexico
- List of number-one albums of 2017 (Mexico)
