= Grupo Liberación =

Grupera group

Liberación

Background information
- Also known as: Liberación de Virgilio Canales
- Origin: Monterrey, Nuevo León, Mexico
- Genres: Grupera, Cumbia, Baladas en Español, Norteña, Ranchera
- Years active: 1975 - present
- Labels: CBS Records (1975–1984); FONO, under exclusive license to Universal Music Latino (1984–present)
- Members: Virgilio Canales (1975-Present); Juan Tavares (1991-2001, 2007-Present); Amador Alvarado (1981-Present); Agustín Martínez (1984-Present); Rubén Darío (2013-Present); Ricardo Gómez (2001-present); Daniel Flores (2007-present)
- Past members: Miguel Ángel Alfaro (1979-1990); Lupe Barrera (1988-1997); Efraín Guajardo (1977-2001); Pepe José Amancio de León (1975-1981); César Guerrero (1975-1981); Ramiro Quintanilla (1975-1983); Sergio García (1975-1983); Ricardo "Kalín" Guerrero (1975- 1995); Juan Mejía (1975-1978); Gabriel Aldana (1983-2001); José Juan Martínez (1995 - 2005); José Guadalupe Martínez "Junior" (2001-2003); Miguel Galindo (2001-2008); Polo Pérez (2003-2010); Agustín "Pollo" García (2007-2012); Marcos Hernández Flores (2011-2014); Gabriel Martínez Blanco (2003-2008); Pablo Portillo (1999-2000); Gerry García (2000-2006); Álex Romero (2001-2008); Luis Díaz (1998-2006); Edwin Luna (2008-2009); Gonzalo Correa (2009-2015); Israel Granados Garza (2009-2013); Marco Garza (2013-2014)
- Website: https://liberacion.mx/

Grupo Liberación, known simply as Liberación, is a grupera group founded in Monterrey, Nuevo León, in 1975 by keyboardist Virgilio Canales. The group is known for its romantic-style songs.

== History ==
After playing in early acts like Los Rítmicos, Los Brillos, and Banda Macho, Virgilio Canales Vega decided to leave those acts and formed his own project in Monterrey, Nuevo León, México. A few of Virgilio's friends suggested that he name the project Liberación, which was a nod to both Virgilio's liberation from Banda Macho and to the prominent global liberation movements of the mid-1970s. The band started with rock and tropical influences, with their debut LP, Flor Sin Retoño, released in 1976, which included an early version of "Estrellitas de Amor" and "Nostalgia Campesina", which Los Temerarios would later cover on their 1987 album Pequeña.

The group's signature romantic sound wasn't solidified until 1979, when Miguel Ángel Alfaro became the group's lead singer. In 1984, they signed to Disa Records, where they would release nearly 30 albums since signing. During Miguel Ángel Alfaro's time in the group, they released albums like Estrenando Novio in 1985, Pensando En Ella in 1986, and La Burbuja in 1988. Estrenando Novio entered Billboard's Hot Latin charts in 1985. In 1988, Lupe Barrera joined the group as the second vocalist, and he would record albums like Tu Príncipe Azul and En Las Alturas.

In 1991, Juan Tavares joined the group and ushered in the group's commercial peak. Juan Tavares debuted in the group's ninth album, Entre Nubes. As of today, Juan Tavares is the group's only vocalist to have the longest run as a vocalist. Juan has recorded albums like Con La Fuerza Del Destino (alternatively titled Con Más Amor) in 1992, Directo Al Corazón in 1993, and Por Puro Gusto (alternatively titled Mi Gusto Es... El Mariachi). Juan left the group in 2001 to pursue his solo career, but returned in 2007 and has since then stayed in the band.

In 1999, Liberación's front line focused on younger vocalists for new-generation listeners. Throughout the 2000s, the group's vocalists consisted of Pablo Portillo, Gerardo "Gerry" García, who would go on to be the male vocalist of Los Horóscopos de Durango from 2007 to 2009, Alex Romero, who would go on to make his own project in 2023, called Insidio, and Miguel Galindo, who would go on to be the lead vocalist of K-Paz de la Sierra a year after Sergio Gomez's passing. Galindo would then start his own project, called Miguel Galindo y Su Bandón.

In 2007, to celebrate the group's 30th anniversary, the group released 30 Aniversario: Duetos, where they would blend their style with other artists and bands from the Disa label. The album included collaborations with Grupo Bryndis, La Arrolladora Banda El Limón de René Camacho, Montez de Durango, Lalo Mora, and more. Juan Tavares came back to the group for this album to record a new version of A Esa along with the norteño group Palomo.

Over time, rather than having the group rely on nostalgia, Virgilio Canales modernized the group's arrangements in later albums like Amigo del Tiempo and Aquí Estamos. To celebrate their 50th anniversary, the group had a milestone concert at Mexico City's Auditorio Nacional on November 16, 2025.

== Discography ==
=== Studio Albums ===
- Under CBS Records / Sony Music Entertainment Latin
  - Flor Sin Retoño (1976)
  - La Discothèque De La Liberación (1977)
  - Cumbias En Salsa (1978)
  - Dímelo Ya (1979 - first album with Miguel Ángel Alfaro as lead vocalist)
  - Qué Importa Ya (1980)
  - Soy Un Perdedor (1981)
  - Cuándo Aprenderás (1982)
  - Un Gallo Muy Celoso (1983)
  - El Precio (1984)
  - Qué Importa Ya / Qué Haré Si Tú Te Vas (2015 - digital reissue of Qué Importa Ya)
- Under Fonovisa-Disa (now FONO), under exclusive license to Universal Music Latino
  - Levantado En Armas (1984)
  - Estrenando Novio (1985 - entered the Billboard Hot Latin charts)
  - Pensando En Ella (1986)
  - El Desfile 1987)
  - La Burbuja (1988)
  - Tu Príncipe Azul (1989 - alternatively titled El Baile Del Pingüino, first album with Lupe Barrera as vocalist)
  - En Las Alturas (1990)
  - Entre Nubes (1991)
  - Con La Fuerza Del Destino (1992 - alternatively titled Con Más Amor when released under Fonovisa)
  - Directo Al Corazón (1993)
  - Para Estar Contigo (1994)
  - Enamorado De Un Fantasma (1995)
  - Por Puro Gusto (1996 - alternatively titled Mi Gusto Es... El Mariachi when released under Fonovisa)
  - Un Loco Romántico (1997 - last album with Lupe Barrera as vocalist)
  - Un Regalo De Amor (1998)
  - Si Estuvieras Conmigo (1999 - first and only album with Pablo Portillo as vocalist, last album with Juan Tavares as lead vocalist before pursuing a solo career)
  - Ahora y Siempre (2001 - first album with Miguel Galindo, Alex Romero, and Gerry García as lead vocalists)
  - Las Canciones Que Esperabas (2003)
  - Que Me Quiten Lo Bailado (2004)
  - Juntitos Los Dos (2006 - last album with Gerry García as lead vocalist)
  - 30 Aniversario: Duetos (2007)
  - Cada Vez Más Fuerte (2008 - first studio album with Juan Tavares coming back as lead vocalist and first album with Ruben Dario as lead vocalist)
  - Raíces (2009)
  - Como En Los Viejos Tiempos, Vol. 1 (2011)
  - Como En Los Viejos Tiempos, Vol. 2 (2012)
  - Amigo Del Tiempo (2017)
  - Aquí Estamos (2021)
  - Aquí Estamos (Deluxe) (2021)

=== Live Albums ===
- En Vivo: 25 Aniversario (2001)
- En Concierto: Gira MEX-USA (2004–2005) (2005)
- En Vivo: El Regreso (2007)

=== Collaborations & Appearances ===
- Te Quiero Así with Emily (1996)
- El Antifaz appears on the original soundtrack for Frida, released in 2002
- Todo Te Creía with El Poder del Norte (2003)
- Ese Loco Soy Yo with K-Paz de la Sierra (2007)
- Y Te Has Marchado with Aaron y Su Grupo Ilusion (2015)
- Esa Noche with Junior Klan (2016)
- Y La Fiesta Continúa... with Ladrón, Los Caminantes, Los Acosta & Los Rehenes (2018)
- Tus Ojos appears on the compilation "Voces D", released in 2018
- Mi Pequeño Amor with Fievre Looka (2019)
- Con El Corazón En La Mano with Los Rayos de Oaxaca (2020)
- Queremos Vida with other artists of the grupero genre (2020)
- Mi Cariñito & Por Una Mirada with Mario Monge (2021)
- Quince Primaveras with Campeche Show (2022)
- Quién Me Ha Robado Tu Corazón with Conjunto Azabache (2022)
- Pétalo y Espinas with Los Yonic's (2023)
- Vestido Mojado with La Tropa Chicana (2024)
- De Uno y De Todos Los Modos with Palomo (2025)
- Limosnero De Carino with Los Rehenes (2025)
- Ese Loco Soy Yo with Grupo Mojado de José Luis Dávila
- Luto En Mi Alma with Los Terricolas
- Con Todo México with Industria Del Amor, Grupo Mojado, La Maquinaria Norteña, Grupo Bryndis & Guardianes del Amor (2026)
