= Grupo Pegasso =

- Also known as: Grupo Pegasso
- Origin: Cerralvo, Nuevo León, Mexico
- Genres: Cumbia pegassera, Cumbia, Grupera
- Years active: 1979–present
- Labels: Discos Remo, Discos Pegasso (own record label), DMY Records, Fonovisa Records, Disa Records, Frontera Music, GEO Records

Grupo Pegasso is a Mexican cumbia band credited with the creation of the cumbia pegassera style.

== History ==
Pegasso was formed in 1979 in Cerralvo, Nuevo Leon, Mexico by Federico “el Pollo” Estevan (guitar player and musical director of the band), after he left his previous band, Renacimiento 74. Mr. Estevan recruited the first band members: Juan Antonio Espinoza (1st Voice), Hector Olavarrieta (Keyboards), Felix Iniguez (Percussion), Jose Santos Rodriguez (Bass Electrico), and Jorge Puig (Drums), and recorded their first album, "Paloma". Before this album was released, all the band members decided to go on their own (except for Jose Santos who for personal reasons decides to stay with Federico) and they form their own band named Paloma. This first album ends up having 2 "masters" and without Federico knowing the other band releases this album, almost at the same time Federico goes back to Cerralvo not knowing what to do. Some local musicians see what Federico is going through and offer to help him regroup. These new band members end up being Emilio Reyna (lead singer), Mario Garza (keyboards), and Miguel Angel Quiroz (percussions) who already had their own local band in Cerralvo named Los Swimmers. Victor Camacho is brought in from Tampico Tamaulipas and becomes their new drum player. With these new band members Federico releases the same previous album recorded but now with the new singers voice on it. After the album, the band starts to perform live, and such is their acceptance and popularity that they come to the United States to start their first tour, which leads them to Dallas, Texas.

Pegasso's second album, Se Tambalea ("It shambles”), was released in 1982 in Mexico and the United States. During the production of Pegasso’s third album Luz Y Sonido (“Light and Sound”) a.k.a. El No Te Quiere (“He Doesn’t Love You”) released in 1983, Garza and Camacho had left and were replaced by new members Marco Vinicio (drums) and Reynaldo Flores (synthesizers). Reynaldo Flores would go on to gain acclaim and fame as a keyboardist. By 1985 the band had become something bigger than they ever imagined and their pride started showing up, with them having small misunderstandings. To resolve these issues, the main band members become equal partners. These being Emilio Reyna, Miguel Quiroz, Federico Estevan, Jose Santos, and the 5th one (which would be the tie breaking decision in case of a tie in important decisions) Roberto Benavidez, who at the time was their representative/promoter. Like it always ends up being when money is involved, one band member wants to be earning more money than others and this was the case with Federico who felt he was the owner of the band and was taking 50% of the total earnings while the rest of the band members had to split amongst themselves the other 50%. These same band members decide to take drastic matters and convene a band meeting with Federico and in a majority of votes decide to oust Federico from the band after he refused to bargain with them in receiving equal pay among all band members. Estevan was faced with the task of obtaining new band members to continue playing as Pegasso. Ironically, he ends up bringing in Juan Antonio Espinoza as the lead singer once again (same Juan Antonio that had done him wrong the first time). Emilio Reyna kept on using the name Pegasso, something that bothered Federico Estevan, so he was forced to use the name "Pegasso del Pollo Estevan". Emilio Reyna kept using the name “Pegasso” even after Federico was ousted from the band, thinking that they were legally doing so, not realizing that Federico Estevan had already registered the name Grupo Pegasso under his name. Estevan decided to defend the band’s trademarked name to court. The legal battle lasted for about 10 years and Estevan eventually won.

By a Mexican court’s order, Emilio Reyna was to change his band’s name and decided to call it "El Pega Pega de Emilio Reyna". People wonder why Emilio decided to use this name, reason being is that when pegasso was being promoted for concerts or any events in general, the promoters would use somewhat of a catch phrase that said,"el pega pega pegassoooo".So since Emilio was banned from using the name pegasso in Mexico, he decided to use the next best thing that people would recognize the band with, this being "el pega pega", although in the US he still legally uses the name of Pegasso until (No Llores Mi Niña, 2008), when he made a decision to change from Pegasso to “El Pega Pega” for the US, but Reyna still managed to made a name for himself and the band on an international plateau, winning numerous accolades, for high record sales in the US, Mexico and several countries of Latin America.

== Musical style ==
Pegasso's arrangements featured organ melodies on the ionian mode scales, which were played using both hands in parallel and in the 10th interval motion between the left and right hand notes. The Hammond B200, Hammond B300 organ and the Technics SX-C600 electronic organ (Portable version of the Technics E66) melodies were played in combination with the piano melody in the montuno style, popular in salsa music. Fundamental blues scales, as well as augmented triad, augmented fifth and dominant seventh chords also feature prominently. Pegasso also performed the style's unique "repiqueteo" (clattering the keys) technique, that can be found in some Jazz and Salsa music improvisations.

Pegasso del Pollo Estevan would continue to use The Hammond B300 Until Muchas Razones Vol. 9 when they switched back to the Hammond B200 which is being used to this day for their albums, and performances

Curiously, in Vol. 9 of “Adolescente y Bonita” from Grupo Pegasso de Emilio Reyna (1988), Oscar Mata (1987-1991), A keyboardist since Vol. 8 “Enamorado” after Reynaldo Flores left the group in 1987, added a final and definitive touch to the band by implementing sounds from the Kurzweil K1000 synthesizer such as adding new strings and choir elements, he also used the Yamaha DX7 from Vol. 8 for the E.Piano and Harp sounds, however this small element would be removed after Vol 9. This style would gain recognition for Emilio Reyna’s group, which Mata would be later credited for the creation of this well known element.

In Vol. 16 (Cosas del Amor) of El Pega Pega de Emilio Reyna the band switched out to a different piano in this album due to issues with the Technics at the time, which they would use a Ensoniq EPS-16 Plus. This sampler keyboard would be used to record this album with the exception that the sounds were used to record were actually sampled sounds combined with the Hammond B300 and the Acoustic Piano sound from the Technics SX-C600 organ. this sound would later be associated with the song “Cosas Del Amor” by Luis “Louie” Padilla (founder and vocalist of La Firma) and would later gain popularity and the most popular song of Grupo Pegasso and El Pega Pega and all of the Música Pegassera.

== The great break ==
In 1988, Roberto Benavidez (manager) and Miguel A. Quiroz left Pegasso. Benavidez had a fatal accident in the San Antonio area.

Also in 1988, Juan Antonio Espinoza leaves Federico Estevan’s group for the second time by accepting an offer from DMY Records to finish an album that Pegasso left pending, due to contract issues between Federico Estevan and DMY Records. Juan Espinoza formed another Pegasso and finished the album titled Muchas Razones for DMY Records.

The two bands continued to have the fundamental style, yet each took it to a separate level giving each an identifiable style. The rhythm continued to be lively and danceable to the beat. The style has kept its syncopated beat on the electric bass guitar against the drum's hi-hat. The congas, cowbell (cencero), güiro and drums, especially the introduction of the Simmons SDS8 electrical drums, have been essential to this musical style and the first ever grupera group to implement this style which would persuade other Grupera groups at the time to add electric drums like the Roland PD-21.

Federico "El Pollo" Estevan has been touring in Mexico and the United States, albeit, (at a lesser degree of success as his counterpart) celebrating the 30th anniversary of his Grupo Pegasso with an album release which contains newly released tracks with the hit "Con tu adios" (With Your Goodbye), "Dos Tequilas" (Two Tequilas) and The Beatles hit "Till There Was You" (Siempre Te Amare - "Always Loving You").

Emilio Reyna, with Pega Pega, also edited new musical productions: "No Llores Mi Niña" (Don’t Cry My Girl, 2007), "Me haces falta" (I Miss You, 2009), and "Cosas del Amor" (Things of Love, 1996) which is considered to be the best example of the new age of Cumbia Pegassera.

== See also ==
- Cumbia pegassera
- Grupo Toppaz
