= Disa Records =

- Parent company: Universal Music Group
- Founded: 1970
- Founder: The Chávez Family
- Distributor: Universal Music Group
- Genre: Regional Mexican, Tropical, Latin pop
- Country of origin: Mexico
- Location: San Nicolas de los Garza, Nuevo León
- Official website: www.universalmusica.com/disarecords

Disa Records is a privately owned record label based in San Nicolas de los Garza, Nuevo León, Mexico. Specializing in Spanish language recordings, the company's works are distributed in the United States by Universal Music Group.

Univision Music Group bought a 50% interest in the company in 2001. In July 2006, Disa Records sued its American distributor and co-owner, Universal Music Group, for using "heavy-handed legal tactics" to obstruct a promised full buy-out of Disa Records by Univision.

In May 2008, Universal Music Group bought Univision Music Group and combined it with its Latin genre to become Universal Music Latin Entertainment.

At the end of a phase of execution of the transfer agreements complicated by the acquisition of Univision by Universal Music Group, Germán Chávez Moreno recreated, in 2013, a record label called Discos Sabinas that works, initially, in partnership with the artist representation company Remex Music and the music publisher Midas3 that are also owned by the Chávez family.

== History ==
Disa Records was founded in the 1970s by the Chavez family and signed with artists such as Grupo Bryndis, Liberación, Los Acosta, Los Rehenes, and more.

The first artist to officially record for Disa was Beto Villa y Los Populares de Nueva Rosita with the song "Cabellos Largos" by Alfredo Gutiérrez.

In the 1980s, its roster included groups such as Los Líricos de Terán, Los Cardenales de Nuevo León, Los Traileros del Norte, Los Vallenatos, Alfredo Gutiérrez, JLB y Compañía, Héctor Montemayor, Banda Móvil, Los Temerarios, Grupo Flash, Toppaz, Los Garza de Sabinas, Cupido, El Golpe, Liberación, and Los Hermanos Barrón. The roster expanded further in the 1990s with the arrival of norteño groups such as Los Reyes del Camino, El Poder del Norte, Los Pedernales, Espuela Dorada, Salomón Robles y sus Legendarios, and Miguel y Miguel.

In 1991, the sub-label Dinastía Musical (Dimusa) was created; its roster included artists such as Ladrón, Míster Gallo, Sonido Mazter, Los Reyes del Camino, Banda Ráfaga, Grupo Azteka, and Paco Barrón y sus Norteños Clan. The label was dissolved in 1996, and all artists in its catalog were transferred directly to Disa Records.

Disa's founder, Domingo Chavéz Pérez, died in 1993, leaving his children—Domingo, Patricia, and Germán Chavéz Moreno—in charge of the company; the group Liberación included a special dedication to him on their album Directo Al Corazón.

The roster of bands also grew to include Banda R-15, Los Nuevos Santa Rosa, Los Tierra Blanca, Los Coyonquis, Banda La Cañera, Banda M-1, Banda Pecadores, Banda Karembe, and El Korita González y su Banda. In the early 1990s, the so-called "Movimiento Grupero" (Grupero Movement) took shape, bringing in groups such as Los Rehenes, Los Bybys, La Tropa Vallenata, Grupo Callado de Tello, Grupo Samuray, Viento y Sol, Los Dinnos Aurios, Wild West, Grupo Bryndis, and Los Acosta. That same year saw the arrival of the cumbia group Los Ángeles Azules; on the verge of disbanding, they joined the Monterrey-based record label where they would experience the most successful period of their career. Thanks to the success of Los Ángeles Azules, other artists—specifically those focused on accordion-based cumbia and the Colombian-style *sonidero* sound—joined the roster; these included Rayito Colombiano, Aaron y su Grupo Ilusión, Chon Arauza y La Furia Colombiana, Los Askis, Grupo Yahari, Banda Kañon, La Perla Colombiana, and Aniceto Molina (a Colombian singer-songwriter with an established career in Mexico). In September 1997, the Monterrey-based company launched a website featuring news and new releases from its artists; this site was later migrated to the official Universal Music Group webpage.

In 1999, Marcha Records was established, incorporating artists from Disa Records; the roster included acts such as Encuentro Norteño (founded by former members of Traileros Del Norte) and Espuela Dorada.

The 2000s saw the arrival of more new artists, including Vagón Chicano, Grupo Modelo, Los Dareyes de la Sierra, Palomo, Joel Higuera, and Mi Barrio Colombiano—a group hailing from Matamoros, Coahuila, Mexico—whose lead singer, Alicia Sifuentes, helped them top the radio charts with their single "Maldito Sea Tu Amor."

Additionally, a new genre was incorporated: duranguense, introduced primarily by Grupo Móntez de Durango, followed by acts such as K-Paz De la Sierra, Los Horóscopos De Durango, Brazeros Musical, and Patrulla 81. In 2004, Terrazas Records—the company owned by José Luis Terrazas, leader of Grupo Móntez de Durango—was acquired.

In July 2006, Disa Records sued its U.S. distributor and Universal Music Group co-owner, alleging the use of "heavy-handed legal tactics" to obstruct a deal between Disa Records and Univision. In May 2008, Universal Music Group purchased Univision Music Group and merged it with its Latin music division to form Universal Music Latin Entertainment. In 2009, the offices and recording studios located in San Nicolás de los Garza, Nuevo León, Mexico, closed permanently.

Disa Records has Discos Sabinas (which is actually Disa's official corporate name) as a subsidiary; this entity is owned by Remex Music—another record label venture by the Chávez brothers featuring artists such as Edwin Luna y La Trakalosa de Monterrey, Los Corceles de Linares, La Casetera, Diego Herrera, and Leandro Ríos. Their recordings are distributed by Sony Music Mexico, with some having been physically distributed by the latter since 2014, up until the acquisition in mid-2021.

On May 14, 2025, Fonovisa announced a rebrand of the label, which is now called FONO: Música, No Borders. FONO’s vision for the future is rooted in a desire to expand Mexican music and culture across the globe. FONO’s artists create music that is a celebration of authenticity, heritage, and origin—music that has no limits.

"As a label, through our artists and their creativity, we have always sought to be storytellers and give a voice to what many are not able to express. With that, FONO proudly epitomizes the present moment, where Mexican Music is growing, influencing other genres, inspiring world-class sounds, and sending messages of unity and cultural pride. We are determined to continue uplifting Mexican culture through the voices of a new generation—artists who honor their roots while redefining the sound of tomorrow. At FONO, we believe music is a living expression of identity, and our mission is to amplify those stories that inspire connection and global recognition."

== Album reissues by the label ==
Disa has had lots of artists on its roster with huge hits on the charts. In the years since its founding, the label has reissued albums under collections like Disa Cristal, Disa Clásicos, and Clasicos Digitalizados. Some Disa Clasicos reissues and most Clasicos Digitalizados reissues made it onto streaming platforms. The Disa Clasicos reissues included two bonus tracks, whereas the Clasicos Digitalizados reissues only put the album out to digital platforms in a remastered way.

Some Disa reissues included:

- Los Temerarios
  - Internacionales y Románticos (Disa Clasicos only, which included poem versions of Acepta Mi Error and Tu Infame Engaño as bonus tracks)
- Los Rehenes
  - Limosnero De Cariño (both Disa Clásicos & Clásicos Digitalizados)
- Los Angeles Azules
  - Inolvidables (both Disa Clásicos & Clásicos Digitalizados. For the Clásicos Digitalizados reissue, the album was renamed to Cómo Te Voy A Olvidar. For the Disa Clásicos reissue, "Ay Amor" and "El Pecado" were added as bonus tracks)
  - Entrega De Amor (Clásicos Digitalizados)
- El Poder del Norte
  - A Ellas (Disa Clásicos, with "No Es Tan Fácil Decir Adiós" and "Amor De Paso" as bonus tracks)
- Liberación
  - Entre Nubes (Disa Clásicos only, which included Por Esa Yegüa and Todo Te Creía, featuring El Poder del Norte, as bonus tracks)
- Los Acosta
  - Hasta La Eternidad (Clásicos Digitalizados only)
- Grupo Bryndis
  - A Su Salud (Clasicos Digitalizados only, which renamed the album to Te Esperaré)
  - Así Es El Amor (Clásicos Digitalizados)
  - Por El Amor (both Disa Clasicos & Clasicos Digitalizados. The Clasicos Digitalizados reissue renamed the album to Amor Prohibido)
- Los Traileros Del Norte
  - Arrastrando La Cobija (Clásicos Digitalizados)
  - Abeja Reina (Clásicos Digitalizados)
- Ladrón
  - Tú Me Quieres Lastimar (Disa Clasicos only, which included "Qué Calor" and "Mi Palomita" as bonus tracks)
- Cardenales de Nuevo León
  - Fuego Contra Fuego (Clásicos Digitalizados)
  - Compraron Una Cantina (both Disa Clasicos and Clasicos Digitalizados. The Disa Clasicos version included "La Zota De Copas" and "Hierba Mala" as bonus tracks.)
- Viento y Sol
  - Par de Anillos (Clásicos Digitalizados & Disa Clásicos)
- Luis y Julián
  - Era Cabrón El Viejo (Disa Clásicos, which included "El Chivero" and "Ando Volando Muy Alto" as new tracks)
- Miguel y Miguel
  - Cruz de Madera (Disa Clásicos)
- La Tropa Vallenata
  - Los Caminos de La Vida (Disa Clásicos)
- Samuray
  - Contigo O Sin Ti (Disa Clásicos, which renamed the album to Dónde Vas Chiquilla and included "Lagrimillas Tontas" and "La Bronco Negra" as bonus tracks)

== Artists ==
- Bronco
- La Arrolladora Banda El Limón de René Camacho
- El Poder del Norte
- Calibre 50
- Grupo Bryndis
- Cardenales de Nuevo León
- Grupo Palomo
- Montez de Durango
- Sergio Vega "El Shaka"
- Los Traileros Del Norte
- Banda Móvil
- Los Byby's
- El Chapo De Sinaloa
- Los Angeles Azules
- Pesado
- Dareyes de La Sierra
- Patrulla 81
- Los Horóscopos de Durango
- K-Paz de la Sierra
- Los Creadorez Del Pasito Duranguense
- Los Rehenes
- Los Acosta
- Ladrón
- Grupo Toppaz de Reynaldo Flores
- Samuray
- Los Temerarios
- Los Reyes Del Camino
- Viento y Sol
- Tropical Panamá
- El Golpe
- Grupo Flash
- J.L.B. y Cia.
- Hector Montemayor
- Grupo Pegasso
- Voz De Mando
- Los Tucanes de Tijuana
- Germán Lizárraga y Sus Estrellas De Sinaloa
- Sonido Mazter
- Los Reyes Locos
- Beto y sus Canarios
- Banda Carnaval
- Chuy Lizárraga y su Banda Tierra Sinaloense

== See also ==
- List of record labels
