= List of Billboard Regional Mexican Albums number ones of 2017 =

Regional Mexican Albums is a record chart published in Billboard magazine that features Latin music sales information for regional styles of Mexican music. This data are compiled by Nielsen SoundScan from a sample that includes music stores, music departments at department stores and verifiable sales from concert venues in the United States.

== Number-one albums ==
Issue date	Album	Artist(s)	Reference(s)
January 7	Paloma Negra Desde Monterrey	Jenni Rivera	
January 14	Paloma Negra Desde Monterrey	Jenni Rivera	
January 21	Mis Rancheras Queridas	Juan Gabriel	
January 28	Mis Rancheras Queridas	Juan Gabriel	
February 4	Mis Rancheras Queridas	Juan Gabriel	
February 11	Andamos En El Ruedo	Ulices Chaidez y Sus Plebes	
February 18	Andamos En El Ruedo	Ulices Chaidez y Sus Plebes	
February 25	Andamos En El Ruedo	Ulices Chaidez y Sus Plebes	
March 4	Andamos En El Ruedo	Ulices Chaidez y Sus Plebes	
March 11	Desde El Rancho	Calibre 50	
March 18	Para Siempre: Duetos, Vol. 1	Ariel Camacho	
March 25	Para Siempre: Duetos, Vol. 1	Ariel Camacho	
April 1	Para Siempre: Duetos, Vol. 1	Ariel Camacho	
April 8	Mexillennials: Los Exitos de Una Nueva Generacion	Various Artists	
April 15	Como No Queriendo	Banda Carnaval	
April 22	En Vivo: Guadalajara - Monterrey	Banda Sinaloense MS de Sergio Lizárraga	
April 29	En Vivo: Guadalajara - Monterrey	Banda Sinaloense MS de Sergio Lizárraga	
May 6	En Vivo: Guadalajara - Monterrey	Banda Sinaloense MS de Sergio Lizárraga	
May 13	En Vivo: Guadalajara - Monterrey	Banda Sinaloense MS de Sergio Lizárraga	
May 20	En Vivo: Guadalajara - Monterrey	Banda Sinaloense MS de Sergio Lizárraga	
May 27	Amor Prohibido	Selena	
June 3	En Vivo: Guadalajara - Monterrey	Banda Sinaloense MS de Sergio Lizárraga	
June 10	En Vivo: Auditorio Telmex	Calibre 50	
June 17	Ni Diablo Ni Santo	Julion Alvarez y Su Norteno Banda	
June 24	Ni Diablo Ni Santo	Julion Alvarez y Su Norteno Banda	
July 1	En Vivo: Auditorio Telmex	Calibre 50	
July 8	Comere Callado, Vol. 1: Con Norteno, Tuba y Guitarras	Gerardo Ortíz	
July 15	Comere Callado, Vol. 1: Con Norteno, Tuba y Guitarras	Gerardo Ortíz	
July 22	Comere Callado, Vol. 1: Con Norteno, Tuba y Guitarras	Gerardo Ortíz	
July 29	En Vivo: Guadalajara - Monterrey	Banda Sinaloense MS de Sergio Lizárraga	
August 5	En Vivo: Guadalajara - Monterrey	Banda Sinaloense MS de Sergio Lizárraga	
August 12	En Vivo: Guadalajara - Monterrey	Banda Sinaloense MS de Sergio Lizárraga	
August 19	En Vivo: Guadalajara - Monterrey	Banda Sinaloense MS de Sergio Lizárraga	
August 26	Vengo A Aclarar	El Fantasma y Banda Populares del Llano	
September 2	Los Gustos Que Me Do	Banda Los Recoditos	
September 9	Me Deje Llevar	Christian Nodal	
September 16	Me Deje Llevar	Christian Nodal	
September 23	Me Deje Llevar	Christian Nodal	
September 30	Me Deje Llevar	Christian Nodal	
October 7	Me Deje Llevar	Christian Nodal	
October 14	Me Deje Llevar	Christian Nodal	
October 21	Me Deje Llevar	Christian Nodal	
October 28	Guerra de Poder	Calibre 50	
November 4	Ahora Soy Yo	Luis Coronel	
November 11	Me Deje Llevar	Christian Nodal	
November 18	Me Deje Llevar	Christian Nodal	
November 25	Me Deje Llevar	Christian Nodal	
December 2	Me Deje Llevar	Christian Nodal	
December 9	¡México Por Siempre!	Luis Miguel	
December 16	No Te Pido Mucho	Alta Consigna	
December 23	Me Deje Llevar	Christian Nodal	
December 30	Me Deje Llevar	Christian Nodal	
