= Cumbia pegassera =

Music genre from Latin America

Cumbia pegassera is a distinctive style of cumbia, the Colombian and Panamanian music genre that is popular throughout Latin America.

== Description ==
According to Federico Estevan, he created the style with the help of Juan Antonio Espinoza, Hector Olavarrieta, Daniel Olavarrieta, Félix Iñiguez, Jorge Puig and José Santos Rodríguez Moreno, all original members of his band, Grupo Pegasso.

Other phrases used to describe this style are onda pegassera, sonido pegasso, and música pegassera. This style of cumbia has roots with the Mexican singer Rigo Tovar, who introduced acoustic instruments into his band. Although this cumbia style reached the height of its popularity in the 1980s and early 90s in Mexico and the United States, it is still popular in the northern Mexican states of Nuevo León, Coahuila, and Tamaulipas.

== Origins ==
The name Grupo Pegasso gave rise to phrases like "onda pegassera". Due to its popularity, other bands adopted a similar style. Among them were Corcel Negro, Cupido, Toppaz, and Zaaz.

One of the basic innovations that shaped this style was the introduction of the Hammond organ, specifically the Hammond B200, later Hammond B300 and, then the Technics SX-C600 which gave a richer sound and allowed prolonged reverb and vibrato.

== See also ==
- Grupo Pegasso
- Grupo Toppaz
