= List of number-one albums of 2017 (Mexico) =

Top 100 Mexico is a record chart published weekly by Asociación Mexicana de Productores de Fonogramas y Videogramas (AMPROFON), a non-profit organization composed by Mexican and multinational record companies. This association tracks record sales (physical and digital) in Mexico. Since May 2013, some positions of the chart are published in the official Twitter account of AMPROFON including the number one position.

== Chart history ==
The yellow background indicates the best-performing album of 2017.

Chart date	Album	Artist	Reference(s)
January 5	Hardwired... to Self-Destruct	Metallica	
January 12	Hardwired... to Self-Destruct	Metallica	
January 19	Hardwired... to Self-Destruct	Metallica	
January 26	Hardwired... to Self-Destruct	Metallica	
February 2	Hardwired... to Self-Destruct	Metallica	
February 9	Hardwired... to Self-Destruct	Metallica	
February 16	Rompiendo Fronteras	Alejandro Fernández	
February 23	Hardwired... to Self-Destruct	Metallica	
March 2	Hardwired... to Self-Destruct	Metallica	
March 30	Primera Fila	Bronco	
April 6	Primera Fila	Bronco	
April 13	Primera Fila	Bronco	
April 20	Primera Fila	Bronco	
April 27	Enamorada Con Banda	Lucero	
May 4	La Trenza	Mon Laferte	
May 11	Primera Fila	Bronco	
May 18	Harry Styles	Harry Styles	
May 25	Harry Styles	Harry Styles	
June 1	Yo Creo	Carlos Rivera	
June 8	90's Pop Tour	Various Artists	
June 15	90's Pop Tour	Various Artists	
June 29	Primera Fila	Yuri	
July 6	90's Pop Tour	Various Artists	
July 13	Comeré Callado, Vol. 1	Gerardo Ortiz	
July 20	Versus	Gloria Trevi & Alejandra Guzmán	
July 27	Lust for Life	Lana Del Rey	
August 3	Noche	José Madero	
August 10	Golden	Romeo Santos	
August 17	90's Pop Tour	Various Artists	
August 31	.5	CD9	
September 21	Rebel Heart Tour	Madonna	
October 5	90's Pop Tour	Various Artists	
October 12	Únete a la fiesta	Various Artists	
October 19	.5	CD9	
October 26	Expectativas	Enrique Bunbury	
November 2	MTV Unplugged: Con el alma desnuda	Emmanuel	
November 17	La Trenza	Mon Laferte	
November 30	¡México Por Siempre!	Luis Miguel	
December 7	¡México Por Siempre!	Luis Miguel	
December 14	¡México Por Siempre!	Luis Miguel	
December 21	¡México Por Siempre!	Luis Miguel	
December 28	¡México Por Siempre!	Luis Miguel	

== See also ==
- List of number-one songs of 2017 (Mexico)
