= Seremos =

Single by El Bebeto
- Language: Spanish
- English title: "We'll Be"
- Released: November 6, 2017
- Genre: Mariachi
- Length: 3:07
- Label: Disa
- Songwriter(s): Espinoza Paz
- Producer(s): Espinoza Paz

"Seremos" (English: "We'll Be") is a song by Mexican singer El Bebeto. Written and produced by Espinoza Paz, the single was released on November 6, 2017. "Seremos" was El Bebeto's second number one song on the Mexican general charts, and his first as lead singer.

== Background and release ==
El Bebeto had previously collaborated with Espinoza Paz on the 2012 song "Lo legal". "Seremos" is the lead single for an upcoming album by El Bebeto, which will be entirely produced by Paz.

== Music video ==
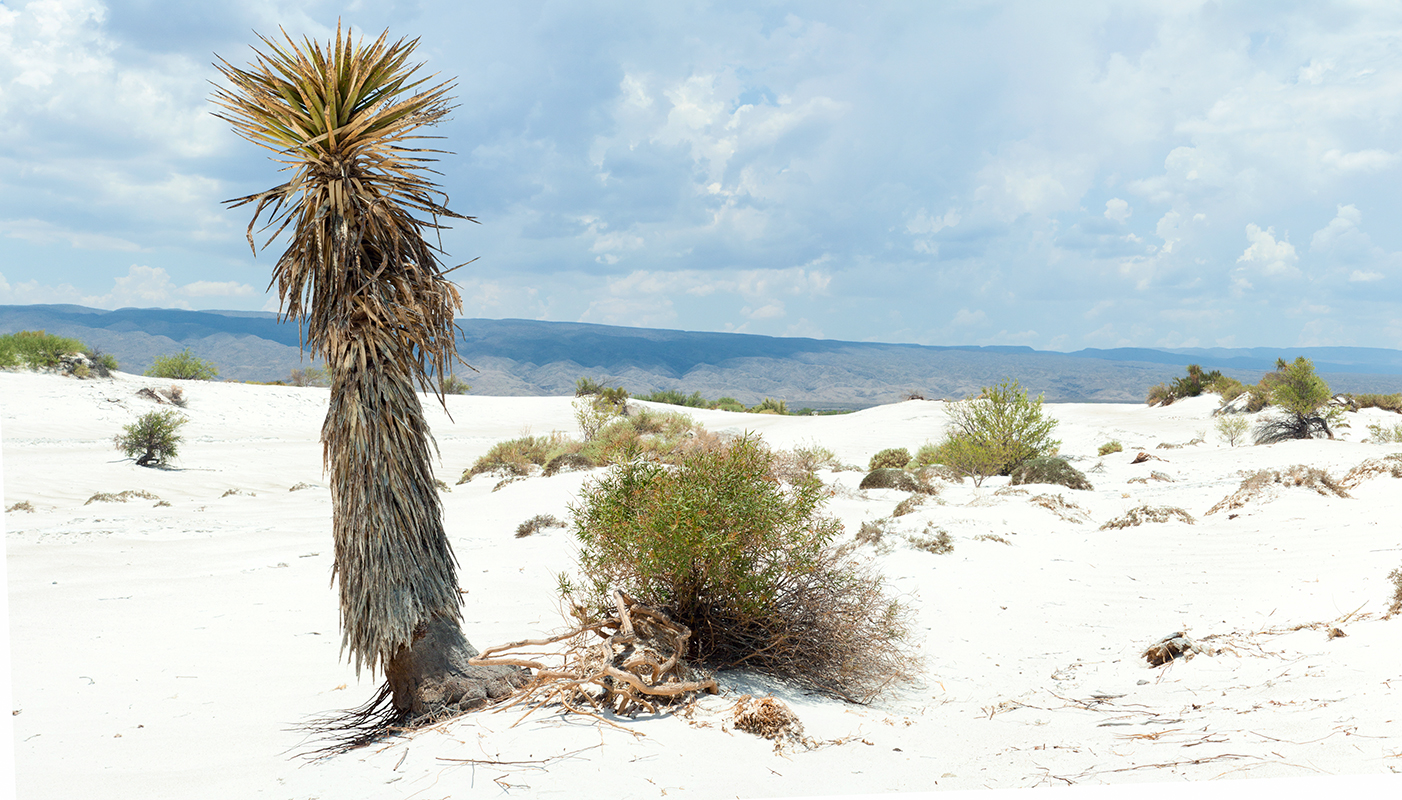
The music video for "Seremos" was shot at the White Dunes in Cuatro Ciénegas.

The music video for the song was produced by Latin Power Music and was released on November 2, 2017. The video was shot at the White Dunes in Cuatro Ciénegas, Coahuila.

== Charts ==
Chart (2018)	Peak position
Guatemala Regional Mexicano (Monitor Latino)	5
Mexico General (Monitor Latino)	1
Mexico Popular (Monitor Latino)	1
US Regional Mexican Songs (Billboard)	10

== See also ==
- List of number-one songs of 2017 (Mexico)
- List of number-one songs of 2018 (Mexico)
