= Asociación Mexicana de Productores de Fonogramas y Videogramas =

Mexican record industry association

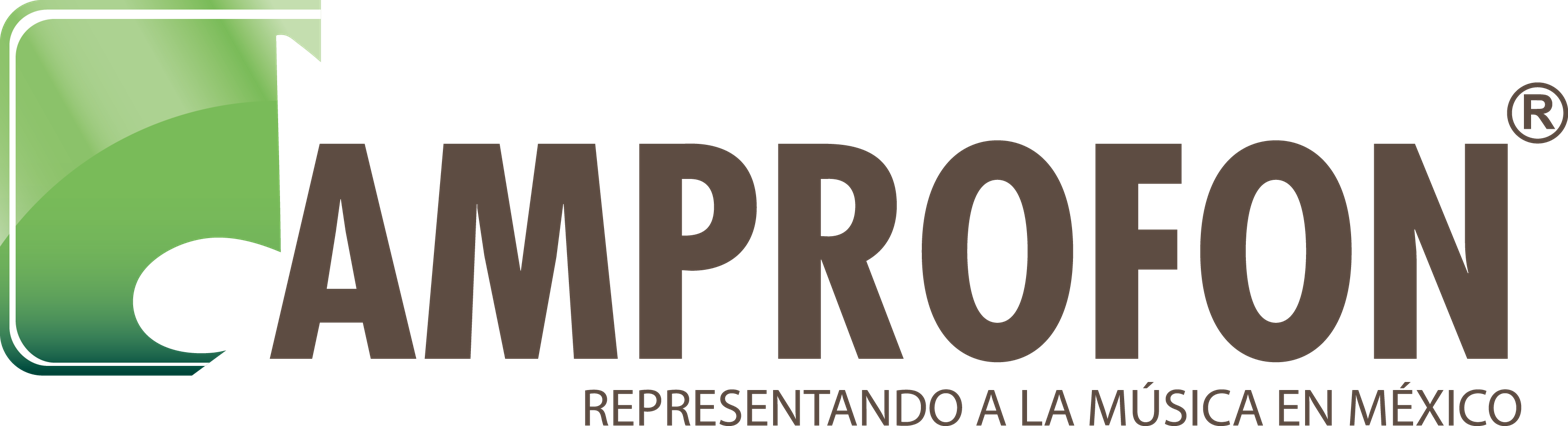
- Abbreviation: AMPROFON
- Formation: 3 April 1963; 63 years ago (as Phonographic Discs Producers)
- Type: NGO
- Legal status: Association
- Purpose: Trade organization protecting music production companies' interests
- Headquarters: Mexico City, Mexico
- Location: Mexico
- Director General: C.P. Gilda González Carmona
- Affiliations: IFPI
- Website: www.amprofon.com.mx

Asociación Mexicana de Productores de Fonogramas y Videogramas (AMPROFON) (English: Mexican Association of Producers of Phonograms and Videograms, A.C.) is a non-profit organization integrated by multinational and national record companies in Mexico. Established on April 3, 1963, it is a trade association of phonographic companies that represent more than 70 percent of the market in Mexico. AMPROFON is an associated member of the International Federation of the Phonographic Industry (IFPI).

== History ==
The organisation was founded under the name Phonographic Discs Producers (AMPRODISC) in Mexico on April 3. 1963. The aim was to create a civil association to represent the rights and interests of the producers of phonographic recordings. The members were:

- Compañía Importadora de Discos, S.A.
- CBS de Mexico, S.A.
- Discos Mexicanos, S.A.
- Fábrica de Discos Peerless, S.A.
- GAMMA, S.A.
- Panamericana de Discos, S.A.
- RCA Victor Mexicana, S.A.

On July 26, 1971, the name was changed to Mexican Phonogram Producers Association (Asociación Mexicana de Productores de Fonogramas) and, as a result of the new medium of music videos, on May 3, 1990, the name was changed to Mexican Association of Producers of Phonograms and Videograms (AMPROFON), its current name.

== Sales certificates ==
The AMPROFON awards certificates for music releases in Mexico. The level of the award varies depending on the format of the release and the quantity shipped. Certificates are usually awarded on the basis of the number of units the release has shipped, rather than the number it has sold.

Format	Thresholds			
Format	Gold	Platinum	Diamond	Notes
Album	70,000	140,000	700,000	Since November 2020
Album	30,000	60,000	300,000	from July 2009, until October 2020
Album	40,000	80,000	400,000	From January 2008, until June 2009
Album	50,000	100,000	500,000	From July 2003, until December 2007
Album	75,000	150,000	500,000	From January 2000, until June 2003
Album	75,000	150,000	1,000,000	From January 1999, until December 1999
Album	100,000	250,000	1,000,000	Until December 1998
Digital/Single Track	70,000 (Note: 22,000,000 streams equivalent units.)	140,000 (Note: 44,000,000 streams equivalent units)	700,000 (Note: 220,000,000 streams equivalent units)	Since November 2020, streaming+digital sales
Digital/Single Track	30,000 (Note: 9,300,000 streams equivalent units.)	60,000 (Note: 18,600,000 streams equivalent units)	300,000 (Note: 93,000,000 streams equivalent units)	Until October 2020, streaming+digital sales
Digital/Single Track	1,500	3,000	N/A	Original digital level superseded September 2010
Music DVD	10,000	20,000	100,000	Deleted since 19 February 2014
Digital Album (Pre-loaded)	50,000	100,000	400,000	Since June 2008, superseded September 2010
Digital Album (Pre-loaded)	50,000	100,000	500,000	Until May 2008
Digital Track (Pre-loaded)	50,000	100,000	500,000	Superseded September 2010
Music Video (Pre-loaded)	50,000	100,000	500,000	Superseded September 2010
Ringtone	10,000	25,000	250,000	Superseded September 2010

The certification award order for Mexico differs from many other certification providers. Most countries award at most one gold album, after which subsequent awards will be platinum, multiplying each time the platinum threshold is again passed (i.e., gold – platinum – 2×platinum – 3×platinum, etc.). However, AMPROFON will add incremental awards for platinum or gold to a recording which has already achieved platinum status (i.e., gold – platinum – platinum+gold – 2×platinum – 2×platinum+gold, etc.), each time a sales threshold is crossed.

== Music charts ==
Charts are updated every Wednesday evening covering national sales in four different album charts:

- Top 100 Mexico albums chart. The list of the 100 best-selling albums in the country. All musical genres are counted as well as EPs.
- Spanish Albums Chart. This the Top 20 of Pop, Rock and Dance albums in Spanish, no matter the nationality. Any album in Spanish is eligible to appear on this chart.
- Popular Music Albums Chart. This is the Top 20 of regional Mexican music, be it ranchera, grupero, or others.
- International Albums Chart. Although labeled "Inglés (English)", this Top-20 chart counts "international" releases, since artists with non-English albums are also included in this chart, no matter the nationality. An album in Spanish will not be eligible to appear on this chart.

AMPROFON does not produce charts for physical sales of single releases, although it does certify shipped quantities for them until June 30, 2009. As of 2017, it publishes a weekly streaming singles chart.

== See also ==
- Monitor Latino
- List of best-selling albums in Mexico
- List of best-selling singles in Mexico
