= Grupo Toppaz =

Mexican Grupera band

- Also known as: Grupo Toppaz De Reynaldo Flores
- Origin: Montemorelos, Nuevo León, Mexico
- Genres: Grupero
- Years active: 1987–present
- Label: Disa Records (1987-1995) AFG Sigma Records (1995-1997) Frontera Music
- Members: Reynaldo Flores Jr.; Héctor Flores; Adrián Tamez; Luis Tamez; Miguel Rodríguez; Ángel Mario Cruz Garza; Jesús García; Martín Cavazos; Luis Fernando Barrera; Francisco Enríquez
- Past members: Reynaldo Flores Tamez (1987–2019); Rubén Darío Flores (1987–2004); Pedro Flores (1991–1995)

Grupo Toppaz are a Mexican Grupera band from Montemorelos, Nuevo León founded in 1987 by Reynaldo Flores Tamez. Their first musical hit was the song Celoso and their style became popular in Mexico, Argentina, Paraguay, as well as in the United States.

== History ==
In 1987, Reynaldo Flores Tamez formed Grupo Toppaz after leaving Grupo Pegasso. Reynaldo played the keyboards and was the musical director of Grupo Toppaz until his death in 2019.

Flores Tamez founded the group with a romantic tropical style that was characterized by the electric keyboards, utilizing instruments from the genre rock, drums, electric guitar, electric bass, with a combination of instruments used in tropical music. Grupo Toppaz reached its peak with songs like “Celoso”, “Rosas Rojas” and “Muchacho Pobre”, among others, being a fundamental part of the grupero movemento that surged in 1980 in the northern part of Mexico.

Grupo Toppaz is one of the musical groups that are part of Cumbia pegassera movement. Although they have recorded new songs like "Rueda mi Mente" from Sasha Sokol, the group is conscious that their fans prefer the musical hits from the 80s and the 90s. Flores Tamez stated "I do not mind that our fans prefer our classic songs, since that means that our music is still alive, the fact that people still request songs like “Celoso” is a privilege for us".
