= El Color de Tus Ojos =

Single by Banda MS
- Language: Spanish
- English title: "The Color of Your Eyes"
- Released: August 14, 2017
- Genre: Banda
- Length: 3:23
- Label: Lizos Music
- Songwriter: Omar Robles

"El Color de Tus Ojos" (English: "The Color of Your Eyes") is a song originally recorded by Mexican duo Octubre Doce, and later covered by Banda MS. Banda MS released their version on August 14, 2017, as the lead single of their album "La mejor versión de mí". The song was written by Omar Robles, member of Octubre Doce. The version by Banda MS topped the Mexican charts and also charted in El Salvador, Guatemala and the United States.

== Music video ==
Directed and produced by Johar Villareal, the music video features lead singer Alan Ramírez as a painter with an unrequited love. The video was shot in the city of Mazatlán and in Durango. 20 paintings of eyes were specifically created for the video.

== Charts ==
Chart (2017)	Peak position
El Salvador Top 20 General (Monitor Latino)	7
Guatemala Top 20 General (Monitor Latino)	4
Guatemala Top 20 Regional Mexicano (Monitor Latino)	1
Mexico Airplay (Billboard)	1
Mexico Top 20 General (Monitor Latino)	1
US Hot Latin Songs (Billboard)	15
US Regional Mexican Songs (Billboard)	1

== Release history ==
Region	Date	Format	Label
Worldwide	August 14, 2017	Digital download	Lizos Music

== See also ==
- List of number-one songs of 2017 (Mexico)
- List of number-one songs of 2018 (Guatemala)
