= Los Acosta =

Music band

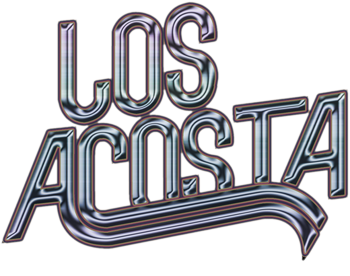
Logo of Los Acosta

Los Acosta is a band from San Luis Potosí, Mexico.

== History ==
On May 10, 1979, Los Acosta was born in a festival organized by a local newspaper in San Luis Potosí organized in central alameda of the Federal District, under the name "Diablo del Rock", playing national and international covers.

From 1979 to 1986, they undergo several modifications both of elements and name including female voices, metals, etc. Several independent recordings in search of a style and musical learning studying music, music theory and playing their instruments preparing for future success without losing faith and hope of succeeding one day in the difficult world of music.

In 1986 a great opportunity arrived to the group as they were hired by Mr. Guillermo Acosta Segura, owner of Discos Gas, recording two Long Plays for this company, thus giving rise to the definitive name of LOS ACOSTA.

In 1988 they are discovered by Mr. Héctor Manuel Maho and takes them to Discos Peerless as a great discovery of popular music recording 8 albums in this company from which several successes in the first places of popularity on the radio and sales as they emerge. They appear in the most important programs of Mexican and United States television.

Among the successes that emerged from these previous productions are: Tonto Corazón, Una Chica Esta Llorando, Sin Razón, Borracho De Tristeza, Voy A Pintar Un Corazón, En Cada Esquina De Mi Barrio, etc., receiving many different awards and recognitions, among them, they also received awards for Albums of Gold, Platinum and Diamond for its high sales.

In 1995 they changed companies and signed for 5 years in Disa and again placed several successes between them: Como Una Novela, Los Chicos De La Banda, Tiene Apenas 16, Contra El Dragón, Deja Una Rosa En Tu Balcón, Como Un Pajarillo and much, much more.

Also appearing in the best television programs in Mexico and the United States, recording various videos and receiving multiple awards and even more recognitions, including exclusive gold and platinum records.

In the year 2000 they sign for Fonovisa Records again placing various successes between them; Palabras, Un Rayo de Sol, Amores Que Engañan, Los Pobres Van Al Cielo, etc. They later record a live album in Dallas Tx. For this label, a DVD is released. and For this company, they recorded for 10 years and delivered 10 albums with innumerable hits.

They are nominated for a Grammy award twice, in 2006, they were nominated for the album "Amor Y Delirio" and later in 2007 for the album "Siluetas".

In 2012 they created their own studio and their own recording company, they recorded different songs such as Cruel Engaño, Tú no Lo Sabes y Me Llamas Para Despedirte, innovating and reinventing themselves with songs of their own as is the custom of Ernesto Acosta and Ricardo Acosta and releasing the first two songs mentioned in two versions, Spanish and English.

LOS ACOSTA are the first group of Mexican artists that have offered to the public, a way to download the complete production for free through their official page: https://www.losacosta.mx

In the year 2016 they seem to find the path of current success, they record innovating in rhythm, composition and lyrics.

The genre is called in this new production entitled XXV, as "MÚSICA SOCIAL". Which contains ten unreleased songs: Que Seas Feliz Con El, Volverás, Un Día Más Sin Verte, Yo Lo Comprendo, Río Rebelde, Te Amo, Donde El corazón Me Lleve, Tu Muñeco, Si Ya No Te Vuelvo A Ver and No. They have managed to capture, with their musical history, a new stage with new and fresh songs, audiences of all ages, from many countries, from all continents around the world and every day they manage to gain more and more followers.

Ricardo Acosta and Ernesto Acosta continue to be the authors and composers of these new songs that are being quite novel and successful, since they are composers of the old school, once again proving to be very prolific, in addition to being authors and composers of around 85% of the successes that they have had throughout their discography, running in the same way for LOS ACOSTA, the responsibility of the arrangements, the executions, the mixing, the production; and all made, recorded, mixed and mastered in their own studio, which is called “ESTUDIO LOS ACOSTA”, and under their own record label “Audiovisa Records”.

On August 25, 2018, through a statement, the group Los Acosta reported that Héctor Ojeda, guitarist of the group, died of natural causes, they announced that the death occurred on Friday, August 24 in California, United States, during the tour that they present in the American Union.

Currently they still continue to produce and innovate new songs such as: A Partir De Hoy, Olvida Ese Amor, Bienvenidos Al Club, Mi Ultima Llamada, El Beso Del Olvido, Una Chica Sin Alma and Yo Te Lloré, which are part of their album "XXVI", recorded between 2017 and 2019, the biggest success of this album has been seen because of a new version of their previously recorded title, "Tonto Corazón" in a new remake. It is important to mention that this is the only group that remains united with most of its original members despite the adversities that their artistic career entails.

In the month of March 2020 they release a controversial theme entitled La Vida De Un Gay from their next album.

At the end of April 2021, they release their most recent album entitled "Corazones Solitarios", which has been well accepted by their audience and listened to by new generations. In this production they return to the style that has characterized them throughout more than 30 years of artistic career.

In July 2021, they move to the genre of 'Regional Mexico', along with genre change came with the release of a single called "Motel De Paso", a little bit after its released, a exclusive version was uploaded to YouTube featuring a segment where they sing the chorus to "Como Una Novela". In December 2021, they release another single called "Con Los Amigos Bebo

In March 2022, they release a Mariachi version of their most well known track, "Como Una Novela." Later in late April 2022, another Mariachi version of another known track is released, "Voy A Pintar Un Corazon."

== Influence ==
As a musical group, due to its stylistics (outfits, use of makeup and androgynous aesthetics), musical structure (minor modalities), prominent use of synthesizers and electronic drums; as well as for the theme of their lyrics (which address issues such as sadness and sentimental depression), they have been incorporated by the gothic movement of Mexico, being cataloged as dark cumbia or gothic cumbia.

== Discography ==
=== Show Acosta ===
- La estación del amor (1984)
- Te quiero (1985)

=== Albums by Los Acosta ===
- Te amo tanto (1987) (first album on Discos Gas)
- Igual que yo (1988) (last album on Discos Gas)
- Siempre te recordaré (1989) (first album on Peerless)
- Tonto corazón (1990)
- Una chica está llorando (1991)
- Historias de amor (1992)
- En cada esquina de mi barrio (1993)
- Vivencias (1994) (last album on Peerless)
- Intimidades (1995) (first album on Disa)
- Raíces (1996) (album on Peerless, released after de the band left the label)
- Los sonidos de su espíritu (1996)
- Hasta la eternidad (1998)
- Volando en una nave triste (1999)
- Los caballeros de la noche (2000) (last album on Disa)
- Nómadas (2000) (first album on Fonovisa)
- Enfermos de amor (2001)
- Nostalgias (2002)
- Ayer, hoy y siempre (2003)
- Ritmo y sentimiento (2004)
- Amor y delirio (2005)
- En vivo (2005)
- Siluetas (2006)
- Evolución (2008)
- Pinta mi mundo (2009) (last album on Fonovisa)
- XXIV (2012) (first album on Audiovisa Records)
- XXV Música social (2016)
- XXVI (2019)
- Corazones solitarios (2021)
- Ahí les va eso (2023)
- Cómo desearía que estuvieras aquí (2024)
