= El Tigrillo Palma =

Mexican singer

Efrén Aguilar Bernal, known professionally as El Tigrillo Palma, (El Varal, Guasave, Sinaloa) is a Regional Mexican singer. He is especially famous for his corridos.

== See also ==
- Music of Mexico
