= Los Mier =

Mexican band

- Origin: Villa de Santiago, Nuevo León, México
- Years active: 1983–present

Los Mier are a Mexican Grupera band. This group is made up of four brothers and a nephew. The brothers are Héctor, on keyboards and lead vocals; Ricardo, on bass and second voice; Eduardo, on guitar and second voice; Alejandro, on drums and his nephew Sergio's on backing vocals and percussion. They also have a brother, his name is Pedro Mier.

== Discography ==
- 1982 - Cachito de luna
- 1983 - De pies a cabeza
- 1983 - Silencio Corazón
- 1984 - A que si te acuerdas
- 1985 - Los príncipes de la música chicana
- 1986 - Como Nunca
- 1987 - La Coloreteada
- 1988 - La Orgullosa
- 1989 - Ámame / Te reto a que me olvides
- 1990 - Desde el corazón
- 1991 - Viva el amor
- 1992 - Sin Limites
- 1993 - Cancioneros
- 1994 - Cuando creí en el amor
- 1995 - Dedicado a ti
- 1996 - Amigos y mujeres
- 1998 - De piel a piel
- 2005 - Mas que antes
- 2010 - En vivo por Mexico
- 2011 - Honor a mis padres
- 2013 - Pienso en ti
- 2015 - Desde el fondo de mi corazón
- 2022 - Contra viento y marea
