= El Poder del Norte =

Mexican band

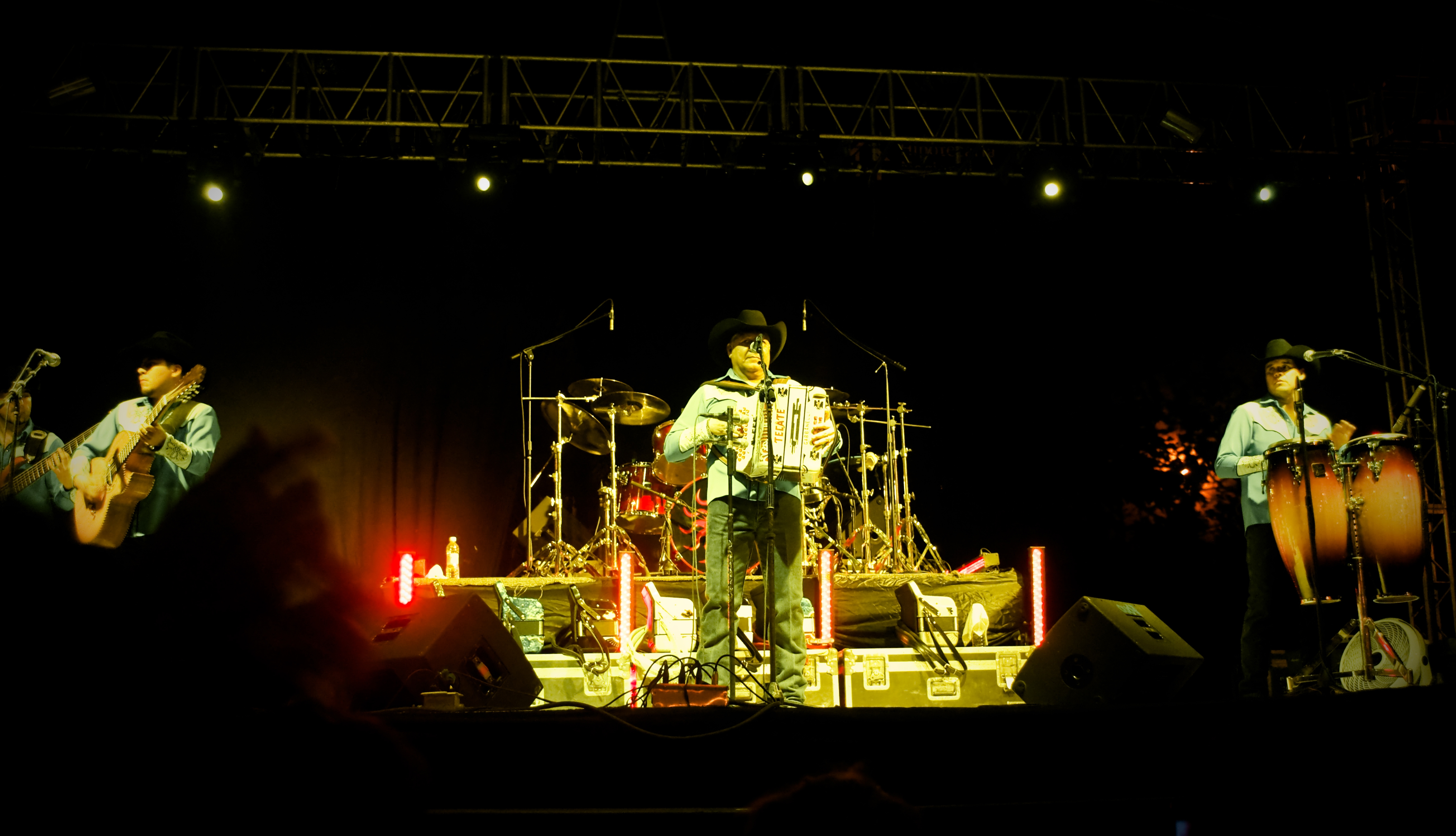
El Poder del Norte during a concert in 2011

El Poder del Norte (The Power of the North) is a Mexican norteño band which was formed in 1987 in Monterrey, Nuevo León. It was formed by brothers Arturo Buenrostro, the accordionist, and Martin Buenrostro, the drummer. Both write songs for the group. They were originally known as Los Pioneros del Norte (The Pioneers of the North). They use an electronic drum for their cumbias.

== History ==
In 1990, Los Pioneros recorded their first album La Suburban de la muerte for Metro Casa Musical (now Peerless-MCM, a division of Warner Music Latina). A year later, they recorded "Cuando llegaste tú" and singles such as "El radio" and "Que se vayan al diablo".

In 1993, the group, now called "El Poder del Norte", signed with Discos Sabinas (Disa). They recorded Mi decision, as well as a video for the song "Como te extraño."

In 1994, they recorded Como llama with the hits "Como llama", "En tu sonrisa" and "Enamorada".

== Discography ==
- 1989: "El poder de la banda" (As Los Pioneros)
- 1990: "La Suburban de la muerte" (As Los Pioneros)
- 1991: "Cuando llegaste tú" (As Los Pioneros)
- 1992: "Buena onda" (As Los Pioneros)
- 1993: "Mi decision"
- 1994: "Como llama"
- 1995: "El Autentiko y único"
- 1997: "Aqui estan...!"
- 1998: "15 poderosos corridos"
- 1998: "Con ganas de ti"
- 2000: "A ellas"
- 2001: "El autentiko y único en vivo" (first live album)
- 2002: "Imagínate sin ellos"
- 2003: "La década"
- 2005: "Ranchero"
- 2005: "El gigante de la musica norteña"
- 2006: "13 años de exitos en vivo" (second live album)
- 2007: "Por siempre"
- 2008: "XV"
