= Edén Muñoz =

Mexican musician and producer (born 1990)

Eden Muñoz
- Born: Rodolfo Edén Muñoz Cantú; September 25, 1990; Los Mochis, Sinaloa, Mexico
- Occupations: singer-songwriter: musician; singer; composer

Rodolfo Edén Muñoz Cantú, better known as Edén Muñoz (Spanish pronunciation: [eˈðen muˈɲos]) (born September 25, 1990), is a Mexican singer, songwriter and producer of regional Mexican music.

== Biography ==
Muñoz is the youngest of four siblings born to Rodolfo Muñoz and Isidora Cantú. As a young child, Muñoz and his family moved from Los Mochis, Sinaloa to Mazatlán.

Edén's older brother Daniel gave him guitar lessons when Edén was eight and he quickly learned how to play it.

After several years of playing music in family gatherings, local bands, festivals, and restaurants, in 2006 Muñoz was given the opportunity to formally join a professional band. He became a vocalist and guitarist for the band Colmillo Norteño, which after ten years of being founded and playing traditional Norteño music, they changed their style to what is now known as Norteño-Banda, a combination between Norteño and Banda music. While in the band, Muñoz learned to play the diatonic button accordion and became the band's lead vocalist. He also wrote some songs for the band.

In early 2010, due to differences with the other members of the band, Muñoz left Colmillo Norteño and formed his own group with the same Norteño-Banda concept and was called Puro Colmillo Norteño. To avoid legal conflicts, the new band's name was changed to Calibre 50.

Between 2010 and 2022, Muñoz was the leader, main songwriter, main producer, vocalist, and accordionist for Calibre 50. With the band, Muñoz managed to obtain the record for the most songs that would reach No. 1 for a Regional Mexican band or solo artist on Billboard.

Muñoz has also been a songwriter of several hits for other Regional Mexican acts.

In early 2022, Muñoz left Calibre 50 to pursue a solo career.

== Discography ==
=== With Colmillo Norteño ===
- 2008: El Cid (studio album)
- 2009: 2009 (studio album)
- 2009: Sueño Guajiro (studio album)

=== With Calibre 50 ===
- 2010: Renovar o Morir (Originally issued under the name "Puro Colmillo Norteño"; later reissued as Calibre 50) (studio album)
- 2011: De Sinaloa Para el Mundo (studio album)
- 2012: El Buen Ejemplo (studio album)
- 2013: La Recompensa (studio album)
- 2013: Corridos de Alto Calibre (studio album)
- 2014: Contigo (studio album)
- 2014: Siempre Contigo (Spotify Sessions) (live extended play)
- 2015: Historias de la Calle (studio album)
- 2016: Desde el Rancho (studio album)
- 2017: En Vivo desde el Auditorio Telmex (live album)
- 2017: Guerra de Poder (studio album)
- 2018: Mitad y Mitad (studio album)
- 2019: Simplemente Gracias (studio album)
- 2020: En Vivo (live album)
- 2020: Desde el Estudio Andaluz Music (live album)
- 2021: Vamos Bien (studio album)
- 2021: En Vivo desde el Rancho San Vicente (live extended play)

=== As a solo artist ===
- 2021: Creo en Ti (non-album single)
- 2022: Chale (non-album single)
- 2022: Chalino (non-album single)
- 2022: Hay Que Hacer Dinero with Banda MS (non-album single)
- 2022: Te Voy a Encontrar (non-album single)
- 2022: No Sabía Cuánto with Michelle Maciel (non-album single)
- 2022: La Historia Debe Continuar: Tour En Vivo (live album)
- 2022: Viejo (non-album single)
- 2022: La Balanza de la Vida (non-album single)
- 2022: Simplemente Amigos (non-album single)
- 2022: Inolvidable (non-album single)
- 2022: Consejos Gratis (studio album)
- 2022: Fuiste Tú (non-album single)
- 2023: Te Invito a Ser Feliz (non-album single)
- 2023: ¿Cómo Se Supera? with MC Davo (non-album single)
- 2023: Vuela Tú (non-album single)
- 2023: CCC with Michelle Maciel (non-album single)
- 2023: Abcdario with Junior H (non-album single)
- 2023: Mi Recaída en los Excesos with Lalo Mora (non-album single)
- 2023: Aunque No Te Pueda Ver (non-album single)
- 2023: Como en los Viejos Tiempos (studio album)
- 2024: Me Aventé (non-album single)
- 2024: El del Trigo with Cheko MG (non-album single)
- 2024: Edén (studio album)
- 2024: Piensa en Mi (non-album single)
- 2024: Los Prohibidos en Concierto (live album)
- 2025: Piedras a la Luna (studio album)
- 2025: Edén Vol. II (studio album)

== Awards and nominations ==
Year	Award	Category	Result	Reference
2014	Éxito SACM	Regional Mexican	Winner	
2015	Éxito SACM	Regional Mexican	Winner	
2016	Éxito SACM	Regional Mexican	Winner	
2017	Éxito SACM	Regional Mexican	Winner	
2017	Billboard	Composer of the Year	Nominated	
2018	Sesac Latina Composer of the Year	Composer of the Year	Winner	
2018	Éxito SACM	Regional Mexican	Winner	
2019	Éxito SACM	Regional Mexican	Winner	
2021	Sesac Latina Composer of the Year	Regional Mexican	Winner	
2021	Éxito SACM	Regional Mexican	Winner	
2022	Sesac Latina Composer of the Year	Regional Mexican	Winner	
2022	Éxito SACM	Regional Mexican	Winner	
2023	Sesac Latina Songwriter of the Year	Regional Mexican	Winner	
2023	Éxito SACM	Regional Mexican	Winner	
2024	Éxito SACM	Regional Mexican	Winner	
2025	Éxito SACM	Regional Mexican	Winner	
2026	Sesac Latina Songwriter of the Year	Regional Mexican	Winner	
2026	Latin Grammy for Best Banda Album	Piedras a la Luna	Winner	

== Artists and collaborations ==
Muñoz has collaborated with or written songs for the following artists:

- Colmillo Norteño
- Calibre 50
- Gerardo Ortíz
- Conjunto Atardecer
- La Estructura
- El Komander
- Julión Álvarez
- Banda MS
- Banda Carnaval
- La Arrolladora Banda El Limón
- Banda La Adictiva
- Banda El Recodo
- Banda Los Recoditos
- Los Gfez
- Los Canarios de Michoacán
- Diego Herrera
- Banda Los Sebastianes
- Los Rieleros del Norte
- Los de La Noria
- Grupo Cuarto de Milla
- Joel Elizalde
- Grupo Firme
- El Fantasma
- Jary Franco
- Joan Sebastian (posthumous collaboration)
- Intocable
- Alejandro Fernández
- La Fiera de Ojinaga
- Geru y su Legión 7
- Jorge Medina
- Pancho Barraza
- C-Kan
- Alfredo Olivas
- Josi Cuen
- José Manuel Figueroa
- MC Davo
- Río Roma
- Los Dos Carnales
- Carlos Rivera
- Pepe Aguilar
- Alex Fernández
- Beto Sierra
- Santa Fe Klan
- Yuridia
- Michelle Maciel
- Christian Nodal
- Bronco
- Panchito Arredondo
- Matisse
- El Trono de México
- Fuerza Regida
- Leonardo Aguilar
- Carín León
- Marca Registrada
- Los 3 del Norteño
- El Frizian
- Nabález
- Toño Lizárraga
- Junior H
- Lalo Mora
- Los Tucanes de Tijuana
- Panter Bélico
- Maná
- Cosme Tadeo
- Los Nuevos Arrendados
- Grupo Laberinto
- Los Dareyes de la Sierra
- Rosendo Cantú
- Luis R. Conriquez
- Mau & Ricky
- Piso 21
- Kany García
- Camila
- Cheko MG
- Luck Ra
- Kurt
- Víctor García
- Máximo Grado
- Óscar Maydon
- India Martínez
- Jesse & Joy
- Diego Torres
- Reyli Barba
- Bacilos
- Pipe Bueno
- Jessi Uribe
- Tony García
- Cristian Castro
- Ricardo Montaner
- Vicente Fernández (posthumous collaboration)
- Alejandro Sanz
