= List of top 20 songs for 2014 in Mexico =

This is a list of the General Top 20 songs of 2014 in Mexico according to Monitor Latino. Monitor Latino also issued separate year-end charts for Regional Mexican, Pop and Anglo songs.

№	Title	Artist(s)
1	"Bailando"	Enrique Iglesias ft. Descemer Bueno & Gente de Zona
2	"Tus latidos"	Calibre 50
3	"Happy"	Pharrell Williams
4	"Counting Stars"	OneRepublic
5	"La historia de mis manos"	Banda Carnaval
6	"No me pidas perdón"	Banda MS
7	"Mi segunda vida"	La Arrolladora Banda El Limón
8	"Fin de semana"	La Original Banda El Limón ft. Río Roma
9	"Mientras tú jugabas"	Banda Los Recoditos
10	"Consecuencia de mis actos"	Banda El Recodo
11	"Decidiste dejarme"	Camila
12	"Te hubieras ido antes"	Julión Álvarez y su Norteño Banda
13	"Dímelo"	Intocable
14	"Mujer de piedra"	Gerardo Ortiz
15	"Y así fue"	Julión Álvarez y su Norteño Banda
16	"De las 12 a las 12"	3Ball MTY ft. El Bebeto
17	"Corazones invencibles"	Aleks Syntek
18	"La noche es tuya"	3Ball MTY ft. Gerardo Ortiz & América Sierra
19	"Diez mil maneras"	David Bisbal
20	"Summer"	Calvin Harris

== See also ==
- List of number-one songs of 2014 (Mexico)
- List of number-one albums of 2014 (Mexico)
