= List of number-one Billboard Regional Mexican Songs of 2013 =

The Billboard Regional Mexican Songs chart ranks the best-performing Regional Mexican singles in the United States. Published weekly by Billboard magazine, it ranks the "most popular regional Mexican songs, ranked by radio airplay audience impressions as measured by Nielsen Music."

== Chart history ==
Key
†	Indicates best-performing song of 2013

Issue date	Song	Artist(s)	Ref.
January 5	"Solo vine a despedirme"	Gerardo Ortíz	
January 12	"Solo vine a despedirme"	Gerardo Ortíz	
January 19	"Solo vine a despedirme"	Gerardo Ortíz	
January 26	"Mi Promesa"	Pesado	
February 2	"Cabecita Dura"	La Arrolladora Banda el Limon de Rene Camacho	
February 9	"Cabecita Dura"	La Arrolladora Banda el Limon de Rene Camacho	
February 16	"Y Ahora Resulta"	Voz de Mando	
February 23	"Y Ahora Resulta"	Voz de Mando	
March 2	"Y Ahora Resulta"	Voz de Mando	
March 9	"Y Ahora Resulta"	Voz de Mando	
March 16	"Y Ahora Resulta"	Voz de Mando	
March 23	"Y Ahora Resulta"	Voz de Mando	
March 30	"Y Ahora Resulta"	Voz de Mando	
April 7	"La Mejor de Todas"	Banda El Recodo de Cruz Lizarraga	
April 14	"La Mejor de Todas"	Banda El Recodo de Cruz Lizarraga	
April 21	"Te Amo (Para Siempre)"	Intocable	
April 28	"La Mejor de Todas"	Banda El Recodo de Cruz Lizarraga	
May 5	"Te Amo (Para Siempre)"	Intocable	
May 12	"Te Amo (Para Siempre)"	Intocable	
May 19	"Te Amo (Para Siempre)"	Intocable	
May 26	"Te Amo (Para Siempre)"	Intocable	
June 2	"Y Te Vas"	Banda Carnaval	
June 9	"Y Te Vas"	Banda Carnaval	
June 16	"Y Te Vas"	Banda Carnaval	
June 23	"Y Te Vas"	Banda Carnaval	
June 30	"Y Te Vas"	Banda Carnaval	
July 6	"Y Te Vas"	Banda Carnaval	
July 13	"El Ruido de Tus Zapatos"	La Arrolladora Banda el Limon de Rene Camacho	
July 20	"El Ruido de Tus Zapatos"	La Arrolladora Banda el Limon de Rene Camacho	
July 27	"El Ruido de Tus Zapatos"	La Arrolladora Banda el Limon de Rene Camacho	
August 3	"El Ruido de Tus Zapatos"	La Arrolladora Banda el Limon de Rene Camacho	
August 10	"El Ruido de Tus Zapatos"	La Arrolladora Banda el Limon de Rene Camacho	
August 17	"El Ruido de Tus Zapatos"	La Arrolladora Banda el Limon de Rene Camacho	
August 24	"El Ruido de Tus Zapatos"	La Arrolladora Banda el Limon de Rene Camacho	
August 31	"El Ruido de Tus Zapatos"	La Arrolladora Banda el Limon de Rene Camacho	
September 7	"El Ruido de Tus Zapatos"	La Arrolladora Banda el Limon de Rene Camacho	
September 14	"El Ruido de Tus Zapatos"	La Arrolladora Banda el Limon de Rene Camacho	
September 21	"El Ruido de Tus Zapatos"	La Arrolladora Banda el Limon de Rene Camacho	
September 28	"El Ruido de Tus Zapatos"	La Arrolladora Banda el Limon de Rene Camacho	
October 5	"El Ruido de Tus Zapatos"	La Arrolladora Banda el Limon de Rene Camacho	
October 12	"El Ruido de Tus Zapatos"	La Arrolladora Banda el Limon de Rene Camacho	
October 19	"El Ruido de Tus Zapatos"	La Arrolladora Banda el Limon de Rene Camacho	
October 26	"El Ruido de Tus Zapatos"	La Arrolladora Banda el Limon de Rene Camacho	
November 2	"Ni Que Estuvieras Tan Buena"	Calibre 50	
November 9	"Ni Que Estuvieras Tan Buena"	Calibre 50	
November 16	"Ni Que Estuvieras Tan Buena"	Calibre 50	
November 23	"Vas A Llorar Por Mi"	Banda El Recodo de Cruz Lizarraga	
November 30	"Vas A Llorar Por Mi"	Banda El Recodo de Cruz Lizarraga	
December 7	"Vas A Llorar Por Mi"	Banda El Recodo de Cruz Lizarraga	
December 14	"Me Interesas"	Noel Torres	
December 21	"Vas A Llorar Por Mi"	Banda El Recodo de Cruz Lizarraga	
December 28	"Mi Ultimo Deseo"	Banda Los Recoditos	
