= List of number-one songs of 2014 (Mexico) =

This is a list of the Monitor Latino General number-one songs of 2014. Chart rankings are based on airplay across radio stations in Mexico using the Radio Tracking Data, LLC in real time. Charts are ranked from Monday to Sunday.

Besides the General chart, Monitor Latino publishes "Pop", "Popular" (Regional Mexican music) and "Anglo" charts. Monitor Latino provides two lists for each of these charts: the "Audience" list ranks the songs according to the estimated number of people that listened to them on the radio during the week. The "Tocadas" (Spins) list ranks the songs according to the number of times they were played on the radio during the week. In 2014, the "Regional" chart was renamed as "Popular".

== Chart history ==
=== General ===
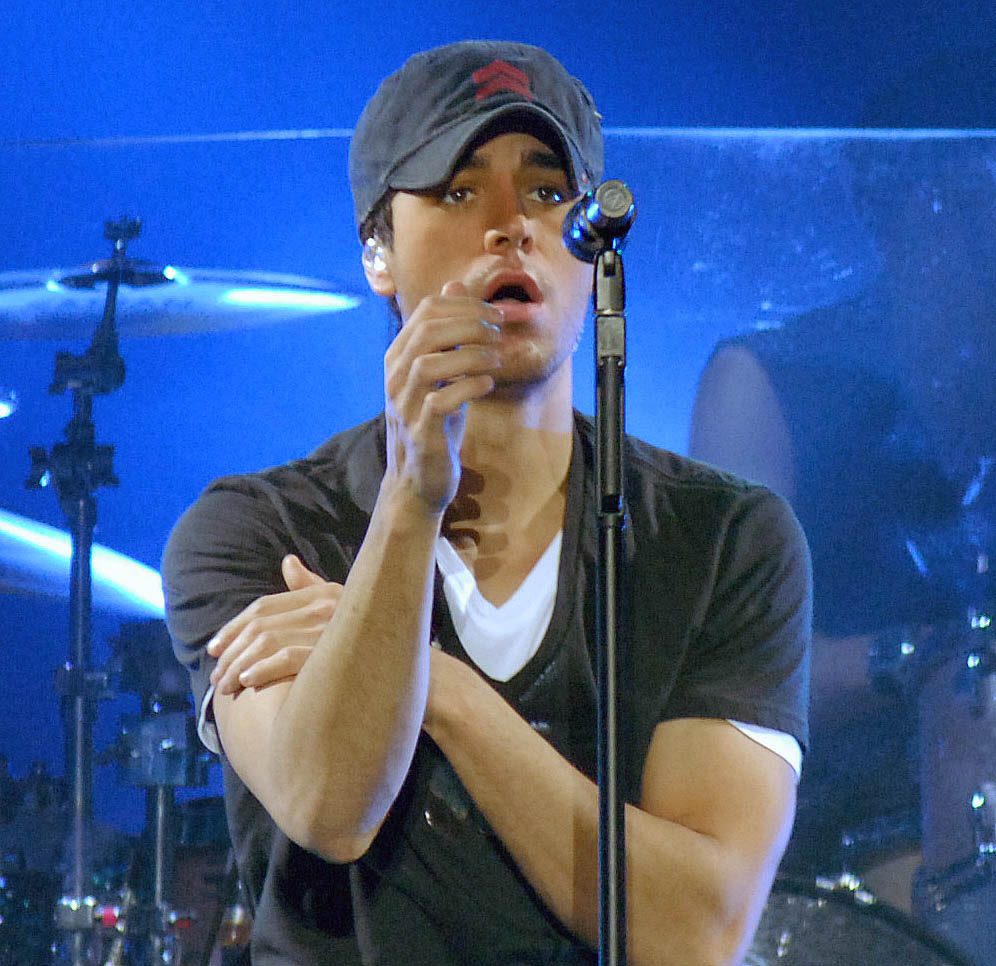
Spanish singer Enrique Iglesias (pictured) had the best performing song of the year with "Bailando".

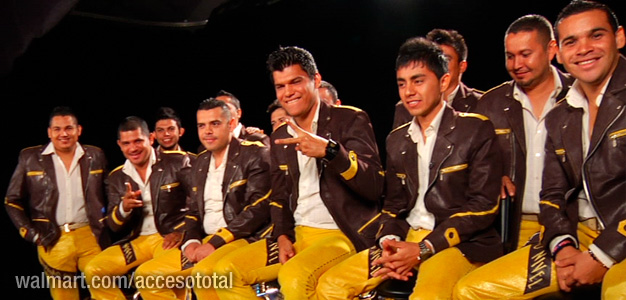
Mexican ensemble Banda Carnaval (pictured) had three General number-one songs in 2014.

The yellow background indicates the best-performing song of 2014.

Issue date	Song (Audience)	Song (Spins)	Ref
January 5	"Mi peor error"^{Alejandra Guzmán}	"El inmigrante"^{Calibre 50}	
January 12	"Mi peor error"^{Alejandra Guzmán}	"El inmigrante"^{Calibre 50}	
January 19	"Timber"^{Pitbull ft. Kesha}	"El inmigrante"^{Calibre 50}	
January 26	"No querías lastimarme"^{Gloria Trevi}	"El inmigrante"^{Calibre 50}	
February 2	"Counting Stars"^{OneRepublic}	"El inmigrante"^{Calibre 50}	
February 9	"Counting Stars"^{OneRepublic}	"El inmigrante"^{Calibre 50}	
February 16	"Counting Stars"^{OneRepublic}	"La noche es tuya"^{3Ball MTY ft. Gerardo Ortiz & América Sierra}	
February 23	"Mi segunda vida"^{La Arrolladora Banda El Limón}	"La noche es tuya"^{3Ball MTY ft. Gerardo Ortiz & América Sierra}	
March 2	"Mi segunda vida"^{La Arrolladora Banda El Limón}	"La noche es tuya"^{3Ball MTY ft. Gerardo Ortiz & América Sierra}	
March 9	"Can't Remember to Forget You"^{Shakira ft. Rihanna}	"La noche es tuya"^{3Ball MTY ft. Gerardo Ortiz & América Sierra}	
March 16	"Happy"^{Pharrell Williams}	"La noche es tuya"^{3Ball MTY ft. Gerardo Ortiz & América Sierra}	
March 23	"Happy"^{Pharrell Williams}	"La historia de mis manos"^{Banda Carnaval}	
March 30	"Happy"^{Pharrell Williams}	"La historia de mis manos"^{Banda Carnaval}	
April 6	"Happy"^{Pharrell Williams}	"La historia de mis manos"^{Banda Carnaval}	
April 13	"Happy"^{Pharrell Williams}	"La historia de mis manos"^{Banda Carnaval}	
April 20	"Happy"^{Pharrell Williams}	"La historia de mis manos"^{Banda Carnaval}	
April 27	"Happy"^{Pharrell Williams}	"La historia de mis manos"^{Banda Carnaval}	
May 4	"Consecuencia de mis actos"^{Banda el Recodo}	"La historia de mis manos"^{Banda Carnaval}	
May 11	"Happy"^{Pharrell Williams}	"Tus latidos"^{Calibre 50}	
May 18	"Happy"^{Pharrell Williams}	"Tus latidos"^{Calibre 50}	
May 25	"Decidiste dejarme"^{Camila}	"Tus latidos"^{Calibre 50}	
June 1	"Decidiste dejarme"^{Camila}	"Fin de semana"^{La Original Banda El Limón ft. Río Roma}	
June 8	"Bailando"^{Enrique Iglesias ft. Descemer Bueno & Gente de Zona}	"Tus latidos"^{Calibre 50}	
June 15	"Bailando"^{Enrique Iglesias ft. Descemer Bueno & Gente de Zona}	"Tus latidos"^{Calibre 50}	
June 22	"Bailando"^{Enrique Iglesias ft. Descemer Bueno & Gente de Zona}	"Dímelo"^{Intocable}	
June 29	"Bailando"^{Enrique Iglesias ft. Descemer Bueno & Gente de Zona}	"Dímelo"^{Intocable}	
July 6	"Bailando"^{Enrique Iglesias ft. Descemer Bueno & Gente de Zona}	"Tus latidos"^{Calibre 50}	
July 13	"Bailando"^{Enrique Iglesias ft. Descemer Bueno & Gente de Zona}	"Bailando"^{Enrique Iglesias ft. Descemer Bueno & Gente de Zona}	
July 20	"Bailando"^{Enrique Iglesias ft. Descemer Bueno & Gente de Zona}	"Bailando"^{Enrique Iglesias ft. Descemer Bueno & Gente de Zona}	
July 27	"Bailando"^{Enrique Iglesias ft. Descemer Bueno & Gente de Zona}	"Bailando"^{Enrique Iglesias ft. Descemer Bueno & Gente de Zona}	
August 3	"Bailando"^{Enrique Iglesias ft. Descemer Bueno & Gente de Zona}	"Renuncio a estar contigo"^{Marco Antonio Solís}	
August 10	"Bailando"^{Enrique Iglesias ft. Descemer Bueno & Gente de Zona}	"Renuncio a estar contigo"^{Marco Antonio Solís}	
August 17	"Bailando"^{Enrique Iglesias ft. Descemer Bueno & Gente de Zona}	"Renuncio a estar contigo"^{Marco Antonio Solís}	
August 24	"Bailando"^{Enrique Iglesias ft. Descemer Bueno & Gente de Zona}	"Renuncio a estar contigo"^{Marco Antonio Solís}	
August 31	"Bailando"^{Enrique Iglesias ft. Descemer Bueno & Gente de Zona}	"Bailando"^{Enrique Iglesias ft. Descemer Bueno & Gente de Zona}	
September 7	"Bailando"^{Enrique Iglesias ft. Descemer Bueno & Gente de Zona}	"Bailando"^{Enrique Iglesias ft. Descemer Bueno & Gente de Zona}	
September 14	"Rude"^{Magic!}	"La bala"^{Los Tigres del Norte}	
September 21	"Rude"^{Magic!}	"Encontrarte"^{Banda Carnaval}	
September 28	"Rude"^{Magic!}	"Encontrarte"^{Banda Carnaval}	
October 5	"La bala"^{Los Tigres del Norte}	"La bala"^{Los Tigres del Norte}	
October 12	"La bala"^{Los Tigres del Norte}	"Encontrarte"^{Banda Carnaval}	
October 19	"La bala"^{Los Tigres del Norte}	"La bala"^{Los Tigres del Norte}	
October 26	"¿Qué tiene de malo?"^{Calibre 50 ft. El Komander}	"¿Qué tiene de malo?"^{Calibre 50 ft. El Komander}	
November 2	"¿Qué tiene de malo?"^{Calibre 50 ft. El Komander}	"¿Qué tiene de malo?"^{Calibre 50 ft. El Komander}	
November 9	"¿Qué tiene de malo?"^{Calibre 50 ft. El Komander}	"¿Qué tiene de malo?"^{Calibre 50 ft. El Komander}	
November 16	"All About That Bass"^{Meghan Trainor}	"¿Qué tiene de malo?"^{Calibre 50 ft. El Komander}	
November 23	"Hombre libre"^{La Adictiva Banda San José de Mesillas}	"Hombre libre"^{La Adictiva Banda San José de Mesillas}	
November 30	"Blame"^{Calvin Harris ft John Newman}	"¿Qué tiene de malo?"^{Calibre 50 ft. El Komander}	
December 7	"Blame"^{Calvin Harris ft John Newman}	"El que se enamora, pierde"^{Banda Carnaval}	
December 14	"Perdón, perdón"^{Ha*Ash}	"El que se enamora, pierde"^{Banda Carnaval}	
December 21	"Blame"^{Calvin Harris ft. John Newman}	"El que se enamora, pierde"^{Banda Carnaval}	
December 28	"Háblame de ti"^{Banda MS}	"Eres una niña"^{Gerardo Ortiz}	

=== Pop ===
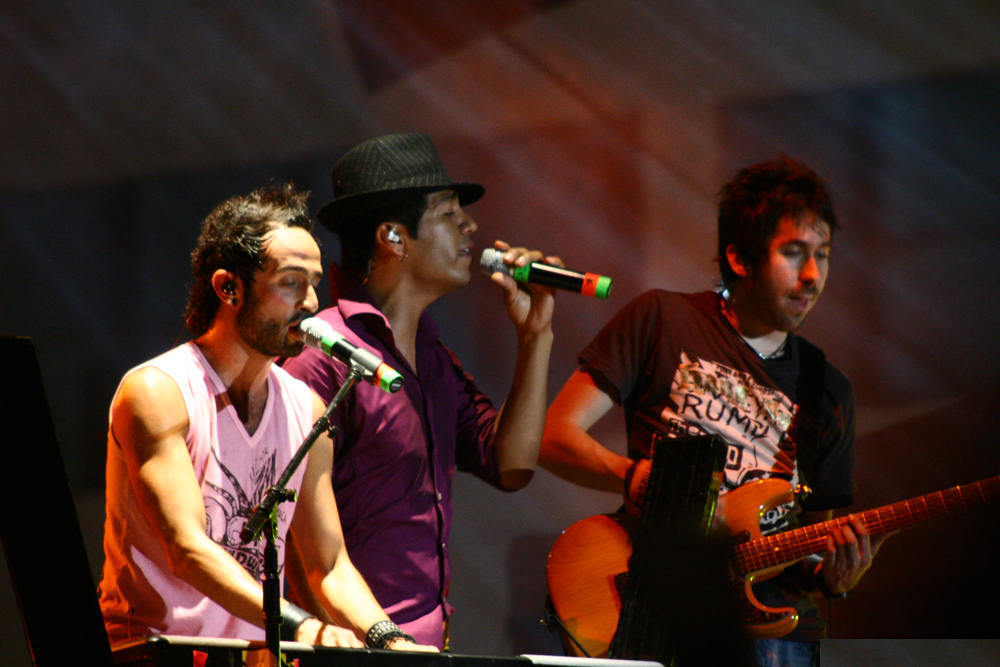
Mexican band Camila (pictured) had three Pop number-one songs in 2014.

Issue date	Song (Audience)	Song (Spins)	Ref
January 5	"Mi peor error"^{Alejandra Guzmán}	"Mi peor error"^{Alejandra Guzmán}	
January 12	"Mi peor error"^{Alejandra Guzmán}	"Mi peor error"^{Alejandra Guzmán}	
January 19	"No querías lastimarme"^{Gloria Trevi}	"No querías lastimarme"^{Gloria Trevi}	
January 26	"No querías lastimarme"^{Gloria Trevi}	"No querías lastimarme"^{Gloria Trevi}	
February 2	"No querías lastimarme"^{Gloria Trevi}	"No querías lastimarme"^{Gloria Trevi}	
February 9	"No querías lastimarme"^{Gloria Trevi}	"No querías lastimarme"^{Gloria Trevi}	
February 16	"Corazones invencibles"^{Aleks Syntek}	"No querías lastimarme"^{Gloria Trevi}	
February 23	"Corazones invencibles"^{Aleks Syntek}	"La luz"^{Juanes}	
March 2	"Corazones invencibles"^{Aleks Syntek}	"La luz"^{Juanes}	
March 9	"Corazones invencibles"^{Aleks Syntek}	"La luz"^{Juanes}	
March 16	"Corazones invencibles"^{Aleks Syntek}	"Corazones invencibles"^{Aleks Syntek}	
March 23	"Corazones invencibles"^{Aleks Syntek}	"Diez mil maneras"^{David Bisbal}	
March 30	"Decidiste dejarme"^{Camila}	"Diez mil maneras"^{David Bisbal}	
April 6	"Decidiste dejarme"^{Camila}	"Decidiste dejarme"^{Camila}	
April 13	"Decidiste dejarme"^{Camila}	"Decidiste dejarme"^{Camila}	
April 20	"Decidiste dejarme"^{Camila}	"Decidiste dejarme"^{Camila}	
April 27	"Decidiste dejarme"^{Camila}	"Decidiste dejarme"^{Camila}	
May 4	"Decidiste dejarme"^{Camila}	"Decidiste dejarme"^{Camila}	
May 11	"Decidiste dejarme"^{Camila}	"Decidiste dejarme"^{Camila}	
May 18	"Decidiste dejarme"^{Camila}	"Decidiste dejarme"^{Camila}	
May 25	"Decidiste dejarme"^{Camila}	"Decidiste dejarme"^{Camila}	
June 1	"Decidiste dejarme"^{Camila}	"Decidiste dejarme"^{Camila}	
June 8	"Decidiste dejarme"^{Camila}	"Decidiste dejarme"^{Camila}	
June 15	"Decidiste dejarme"^{Camila}	"Decidiste dejarme"^{Camila}	
June 22	"Decidiste dejarme"^{Camila}	"Decidiste dejarme"^{Camila}	
June 29	"Decidiste dejarme"^{Camila}	"Decidiste dejarme"^{Camila}	
July 6	"Decidiste dejarme"^{Camila}	"Decidiste dejarme"^{Camila}	
July 13	"Decidiste dejarme"^{Camila}	"Decidiste dejarme"^{Camila}	
July 20	"Decidiste dejarme"^{Camila}	"Decidiste dejarme"^{Camila}	
July 27	"Decidiste dejarme"^{Camila}	"Decidiste dejarme"^{Camila}	
August 3	"Decidiste dejarme"^{Camila}	"Decidiste dejarme"^{Camila}	
August 10	"Bailando"^{Enrique Iglesias ft. Descemer Bueno & Gente de Zona}	"Bailando"^{Enrique Iglesias ft. Descemer Bueno & Gente de Zona}	
August 17	"Bailando"^{Enrique Iglesias ft. Descemer Bueno & Gente de Zona}	"Bailando"^{Enrique Iglesias ft. Descemer Bueno & Gente de Zona}	
August 24	"Bailando"^{Enrique Iglesias ft. Descemer Bueno & Gente de Zona}	"Bailando"^{Enrique Iglesias ft. Descemer Bueno & Gente de Zona}	
August 31	"Bailando"^{Enrique Iglesias ft. Descemer Bueno & Gente de Zona}	"Bailando"^{Enrique Iglesias ft. Descemer Bueno & Gente de Zona}	
September 7	"Perdón"^{Camila}	"Bailando"^{Enrique Iglesias ft. Descemer Bueno & Gente de Zona}	
September 14	"Perdón"^{Camila}	"Perdón"^{Camila}	
September 21	"Perdón"^{Camila}	"Perdón"^{Camila}	
September 28	"Perdón"^{Camila}	"Perdón"^{Camila}	
October 5	"Perdón"^{Camila}	"Perdón"^{Camila}	
October 12	"Perdón"^{Camila}	"Perdón"^{Camila}	
October 19	"Tu respiración"^{Chayanne}	"Habla blah blah"^{Gloria Trevi}	
October 26	"Tu respiración"^{Chayanne}	"Habla blah blah"^{Gloria Trevi}	
November 2	"Adiós"^{Ricky Martin}	"Perdón, perdón"^{Ha*Ash}	
November 9	"Adiós"^{Ricky Martin}	"Perdón, perdón"^{Ha*Ash}	
November 16	"Perdón, perdón"^{Ha*Ash}	"Perdón, perdón"^{Ha*Ash}	
November 23	"Perdón, perdón"^{Ha*Ash}	"Perdón, perdón"^{Ha*Ash}	
November 30	"Perdón, perdón"^{Ha*Ash}	"Perdón, perdón"^{Ha*Ash}	
December 7	"Perdón, perdón"^{Ha*Ash}	"Perdón, perdón"^{Ha*Ash}	
December 14	"Perdón, perdón"^{Ha*Ash}	"Perdón, perdón"^{Ha*Ash}	
December 21	"Perdón, perdón"^{Ha*Ash}	"Perdón, perdón"^{Ha*Ash}	
December 28	"De Venus"^{Camila}	"Perdón, perdón"^{Ha*Ash}	

=== Popular ===
This chart, which had been called "Grupero" from 2002 to 2006 and "Regional" from 2007 to 2013, once again changed its name to "Popular" in 2014.

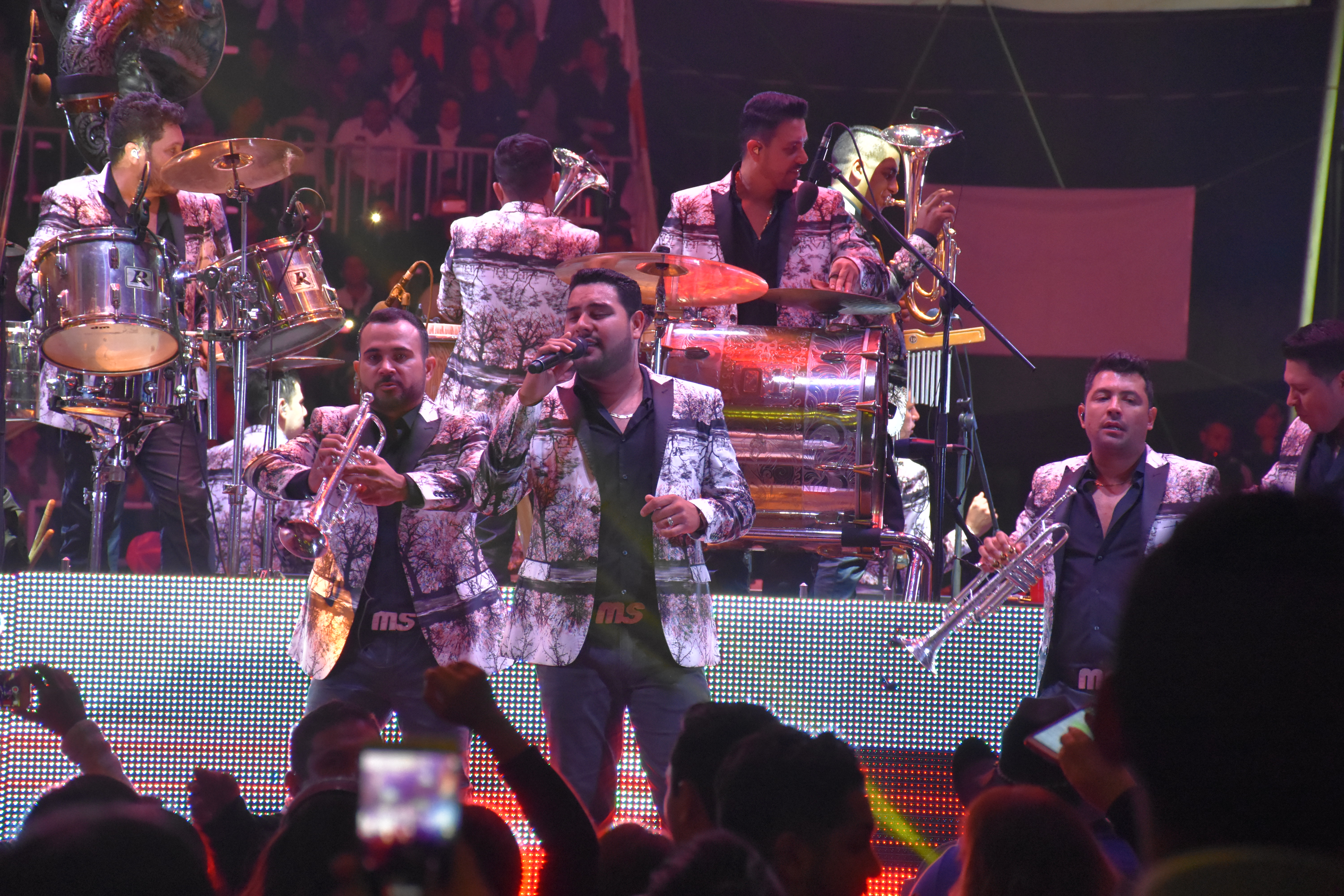
Mexican ensemble Banda MS (pictured) had three Popular number-one songs in 2014.

Issue date	Song (Audience)	Song (Spins)	Ref
January 5	"El inmigrante"^{Calibre 50}	"El inmigrante"^{Calibre 50}	
January 12	"Hermosa experiencia"^{Banda MS}	"El inmigrante"^{Calibre 50}	
January 19	"Hermosa experiencia"^{Banda MS}	"El inmigrante"^{Calibre 50}	
January 26	"Mi segunda vida"^{La Arrolladora Banda El Limón}	"El inmigrante"^{Calibre 50}	
February 2	"Mi segunda vida"^{La Arrolladora Banda El Limón}	"El inmigrante"^{Calibre 50}	
February 9	"Mi segunda vida"^{La Arrolladora Banda El Limón}	"El inmigrante"^{Calibre 50}	
February 16	"Mi segunda vida"^{La Arrolladora Banda El Limón}	"El inmigrante"^{Calibre 50}	
February 23	"Mi segunda vida"^{La Arrolladora Banda El Limón}	"El inmigrante"^{Calibre 50}	
March 2	"Mi segunda vida"^{La Arrolladora Banda El Limón}	"El inmigrante"^{Calibre 50}	
March 9	"Consecuencia de mis actos"^{Banda el Recodo}	"El inmigrante"^{Calibre 50}	
March 16	"Lo más interesante"^{El Bebeto}	"El inmigrante"^{Calibre 50}	
March 23	"Lo más interesante"^{El Bebeto}	"La historia de mis manos"^{Banda Carnaval}	
March 30	"Mujer de piedra"^{Gerardo Ortiz}	"La historia de mis manos"^{Banda Carnaval}	
April 6	"Consecuencia de mis actos"^{Banda el Recodo}	"La historia de mis manos"^{Banda Carnaval}	
April 13	"Consecuencia de mis actos"^{Banda el Recodo}	"La historia de mis manos"^{Banda Carnaval}	
April 20	"Consecuencia de mis actos"^{Banda el Recodo}	"La historia de mis manos"^{Banda Carnaval}	
April 27	"Consecuencia de mis actos"^{Banda el Recodo}	"La historia de mis manos"^{Banda Carnaval}	
May 4	"Consecuencia de mis actos"^{Banda el Recodo}	"La historia de mis manos"^{Banda Carnaval}	
May 11	"No me pidas perdón"^{Banda MS}	"Tus latidos"^{Calibre 50}	
May 18	"No me pidas perdón"^{Banda MS}	"Tus latidos"^{Calibre 50}	
May 25	"No me pidas perdón"^{Banda MS}	"Tus latidos"^{Calibre 50}	
June 1	"No me pidas perdón"^{Banda MS}	"Tus latidos"^{Calibre 50}	
June 8	"No me pidas perdón"^{Banda MS}	"Tus latidos"^{Calibre 50}	
June 15	"Me dejaste acostumbrado"^{La Arrolladora Banda El Limón}	"Tus latidos"^{Calibre 50}	
June 22	"Dímelo"^{Intocable}	"Tus latidos"^{Calibre 50}	
June 29	"No me pidas perdón"^{Banda MS}	"Tus latidos"^{Calibre 50}	
July 6	"No me pidas perdón"^{Banda MS}	"Tus latidos"^{Calibre 50}	
July 13	"Tus latidos"^{Calibre 50}	"Tus latidos"^{Calibre 50}	
July 20	"Tus latidos"^{Calibre 50}	"Tus latidos"^{Calibre 50}	
July 27	"No me dolió"^{La Original Banda El Limón}	"Tus latidos"^{Calibre 50}	
August 3	"No me pidas perdón"^{Banda MS}	"Y me besa"^{Gerardo Ortiz}	
August 10	"No me dolió"^{La Original Banda El Limón}	"Y me besa"^{Gerardo Ortiz}	
August 17	"No me pidas perdón"^{Banda MS}	"Y me besa"^{Gerardo Ortiz}	
August 24	"No me pidas perdón"^{Banda MS}	"Apenas te fuiste ayer"^{Leandro Ríos ft. Raúl Hernández}	
August 31	"Y así fue"^{Julión Álvarez y su Norteño Banda}	"Encontrarte"^{Banda Carnaval}	
September 7	"Y me besa"^{Gerardo Ortiz}	"Apenas te fuiste ayer"^{Leandro Ríos ft. Raúl Hernández}	
September 14	"Tres disparos"^{Banda La Trakalosa de Monterrey}	"La bala"^{Los Tigres del Norte}	
September 21	"La bala"^{Los Tigres del Norte}	"Encontrarte"^{Banda Carnaval}	
September 28	"La bala"^{Los Tigres del Norte}	"Encontrarte"^{Banda Carnaval}	
October 5	"La bala"^{Los Tigres del Norte}	"La bala"^{Los Tigres del Norte}	
October 12	"La bala"^{Los Tigres del Norte}	"Encontrarte"^{Banda Carnaval}	
October 19	"La bala"^{Los Tigres del Norte}	"La bala"^{Los Tigres del Norte}	
October 26	"¿Qué tiene de malo?"^{Calibre 50 ft. El Komander}	"¿Qué tiene de malo?"^{Calibre 50 ft. El Komander}	
November 2	"¿Qué tiene de malo?"^{Calibre 50 ft. El Komander}	"¿Qué tiene de malo?"^{Calibre 50 ft. El Komander}	
November 9	"¿Qué tiene de malo?"^{Calibre 50 ft. El Komander}	"¿Qué tiene de malo?"^{Calibre 50 ft. El Komander}	
November 16	"Háblame de ti"^{Banda MS}	"¿Qué tiene de malo?"^{Calibre 50 ft. El Komander}	
November 23	"Hombre libre"^{La Adictiva Banda San José de Mesillas}	"Hombre libre"^{La Adictiva Banda San José de Mesillas}	
November 30	"Háblame de ti"^{Banda MS}	"¿Qué tiene de malo?"^{Calibre 50 ft. El Komander}	
December 7	"Háblame de ti"^{Banda MS}	"El que se enamora, pierde"^{Banda Carnaval}	
December 14	"Háblame de ti"^{Banda MS}	"El que se enamora, pierde"^{Banda Carnaval}	
December 21	"Háblame de ti"^{Banda MS}	"El que se enamora, pierde"^{Banda Carnaval}	
December 28	"Háblame de ti"^{Banda MS}	"Eres una niña"^{Gerardo Ortiz}	

=== Anglo ===
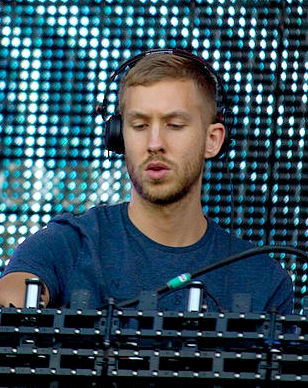
Scottish DJ Calvin Harris (pictured) had two Anglo number-one songs in 2014.

Issue date	Song (Audience)	Song (Spins)	Ref
January 5	"Story of My Life"^{One Direction}	"Wrecking Ball"^{Miley Cyrus}	
January 12	"You Make Me"^{Avicii}	"Timber"^{Pitbull ft. Kesha}	
January 19	"You Make Me"^{Avicii}	"Timber"^{Pitbull ft. Kesha}	
January 26	"You Make Me"^{Avicii}	"Timber"^{Pitbull ft. Kesha}	
February 2	"Counting Stars"^{OneRepublic}	"Can't Remember to Forget You"^{Shakira ft. Rihanna}	
February 9	"Counting Stars"^{OneRepublic}	"Can't Remember to Forget You"^{Shakira ft. Rihanna}	
February 16	"Counting Stars"^{OneRepublic}	"Can't Remember to Forget You"^{Shakira ft. Rihanna}	
February 23	"Counting Stars"^{OneRepublic}	"Can't Remember to Forget You"^{Shakira ft. Rihanna}	
March 2	"Can't Remember to Forget You"^{Shakira ft. Rihanna}	"Can't Remember to Forget You"^{Shakira ft. Rihanna}	
March 9	"Can't Remember to Forget You"^{Shakira ft. Rihanna}	"Can't Remember to Forget You"^{Shakira ft. Rihanna}	
March 16	"Can't Remember to Forget You"^{Shakira ft. Rihanna}	"Happy"^{Pharrell Williams}	
March 23	"Happy"^{Pharrell Williams}	"Can't Remember to Forget You"^{Shakira ft. Rihanna}	
March 30	"Happy"^{Pharrell Williams}	"Happy"^{Pharrell Williams}	
April 6	"Happy"^{Pharrell Williams}	"Happy"^{Pharrell Williams}	
April 13	"Happy"^{Pharrell Williams}	"Happy"^{Pharrell Williams}	
April 20	"Happy"^{Pharrell Williams}	"Happy"^{Pharrell Williams}	
April 27	"Happy"^{Pharrell Williams}	"Happy"^{Pharrell Williams}	
May 4	"Happy"^{Pharrell Williams}	"Happy"^{Pharrell Williams}	
May 11	"Happy"^{Pharrell Williams}	"Happy"^{Pharrell Williams}	
May 18	"Happy"^{Pharrell Williams}	"Happy"^{Pharrell Williams}	
May 25	"Happy"^{Pharrell Williams}	"Happy"^{Pharrell Williams}	
June 1	"Summer"^{Calvin Harris}	"Happy"^{Pharrell Williams}	
June 8	"Best Day of My Life"^{American Authors}	"Happy"^{Pharrell Williams}	
June 15	"Summer"^{Calvin Harris}	"Best Day of My Life"^{American Authors}	
June 22	"Summer"^{Calvin Harris}	"We Are One (Ole Ola)"^{Pitbull ft. Jennifer Lopez & Claudia Leitte}	
June 29	"Summer"^{Calvin Harris}	"Summer"^{Calvin Harris}	
July 6	"Summer"^{Calvin Harris}	"Summer"^{Calvin Harris}	
July 13	"Summer"^{Calvin Harris}	"Summer"^{Calvin Harris}	
July 20	"Summer"^{Calvin Harris}	"Summer"^{Calvin Harris}	
July 27	"Summer"^{Calvin Harris}	"Summer"^{Calvin Harris}	
August 3	"Summer"^{Calvin Harris}	"Summer"^{Calvin Harris}	
August 10	"Rude"^{Magic!}	"Rude"^{Magic!}	
August 17	"Rude"^{Magic!}	"Rude"^{Magic!}	
August 24	"Rude"^{Magic!}	"Rude"^{Magic!}	
August 31	"Rude"^{Magic!}	"Rude"^{Magic!}	
September 7	"Rude"^{Magic!}	"Rude"^{Magic!}	
September 14	"Rude"^{Magic!}	"Rude"^{Magic!}	
September 21	"Rude"^{Magic!}	"Rude"^{Magic!}	
September 28	"Rude"^{Magic!}	"Rude"^{Magic!}	
October 5	"Rude"^{Magic!}	"Rude"^{Magic!}	
October 12	"Rude"^{Magic!}	"Rude"^{Magic!}	
October 19	"All About That Bass"^{Meghan Trainor}	"All About That Bass"^{Meghan Trainor}	
October 26	"Shake It Off"^{Taylor Swift}	"All About That Bass"^{Meghan Trainor}	
November 2	"All About That Bass"^{Meghan Trainor}	"All About That Bass"^{Meghan Trainor}	
November 9	"Shake It Off"^{Taylor Swift}	"All About That Bass"^{Meghan Trainor}	
November 16	"Shake It Off"^{Taylor Swift}	"All About That Bass"^{Meghan Trainor}	
November 23	"Habits"^{Tove Lo}	"Blame"^{Calvin Harris ft. John Newman}	
November 30	"Habits"^{Tove Lo}	"Blame"^{Calvin Harris ft. John Newman}	
December 7	"Habits"^{Tove Lo}	"Blame"^{Calvin Harris ft. John Newman}	
December 14	"Habits"^{Tove Lo}	"Blame"^{Calvin Harris ft. John Newman}	
December 21	"Blame"^{Calvin Harris ft. John Newman}	"Blame"^{Calvin Harris ft. John Newman}	
December 28	"Habits"^{Tove Lo}	"Habits"^{Tove Lo}	

== See also ==
- List of Top 20 songs for 2014 in Mexico
- List of number-one albums of 2014 (Mexico)
