= List of number-one Billboard Regional Mexican Songs of 2016 =

The Billboard Regional Mexican Songs is a subchart of the Latin Airplay chart that ranks the best-performing songs on Regional Mexican radio stations in the United States. Published weekly by Billboard magazine, it ranks the "most popular regional Mexican songs, ranked by radio airplay audience impressions as measured by Nielsen Music".

== Chart history ==
Issue date	Song	Artist(s)	Ref.
January 2	"Despues de Ti Quien"	La Adictiva Banda San Jose de Mesillas	
January 9	"Despues de Ti Quien"	La Adictiva Banda San Jose de Mesillas	
January 16	"Despues de Ti Quien"	La Adictiva Banda San Jose de Mesillas	
January 23	"Despues de Ti Quien"	La Adictiva Banda San Jose de Mesillas	
January 30	"Solo Con Verte"	Banda El Recodo de Cruz Lizarraga	
February 6	"Solo Con Verte"	Banda El Recodo de Cruz Lizarraga	
February 13	"Solo Con Verte"	Banda El Recodo de Cruz Lizarraga	
February 20	"Solo Con Verte"	Banda El Recodo de Cruz Lizarraga	
February 27	"Solo Con Verte"	Banda El Recodo de Cruz Lizarraga	
March 5	"Solo Con Verte"	Banda El Recodo de Cruz Lizarraga	
March 12	"Por Que Terminamos?"	Gerardo Ortíz	
March 19	"Solo Con Verte"	Banda El Recodo de Cruz Lizarraga	
March 26	"Solo Con Verte"	Banda El Recodo de Cruz Lizarraga	
April 2	"Solo Con Verte"	Banda El Recodo de Cruz Lizarraga	
April 9	"Ya Te Perdi La Fe"	La Arrolladora Banda el Limón de René Camacho	
April 16	"Ya Te Perdi La Fe"	La Arrolladora Banda el Limón de René Camacho	
April 23	"Prestamela A Mi"	Calibre 50	
April 30	"Prestamela A Mi"	Calibre 50	
May 7	"Prestamela A Mi"	Calibre 50	
May 14	"Prestamela A Mi"	Calibre 50	
May 21	"Prestamela A Mi"	Calibre 50	
May 28	"Prestamela A Mi"	Calibre 50	
June 4	"Me Va A Pesar"	La Arrolladora Banda el Limón de René Camacho	
June 11	"Me Va A Pesar"	La Arrolladora Banda el Limón de René Camacho	
June 18	"Me Va A Pesar"	La Arrolladora Banda el Limón de René Camacho	
June 25	"Me Va A Pesar"	La Arrolladora Banda el Limón de René Camacho	
July 2	"Me Va A Pesar"	La Arrolladora Banda el Limón de René Camacho	
July 9	"Me Vas A Extranar"	Banda El Recodo de Cruz Lizarraga	
July 16	"Me Vas A Extranar"	Banda El Recodo de Cruz Lizarraga	
July 23	"Me Va A Pesar"	La Arrolladora Banda el Limón de René Camacho	
July 30	"Me Vas A Extranar"	Banda El Recodo de Cruz Lizarraga	
August 6	"Me Vas A Extranar"	Banda El Recodo de Cruz Lizarraga	
August 13	"Me Vas A Extranar"	Banda El Recodo de Cruz Lizarraga	
August 20	"Me Vas A Extranar"	Banda El Recodo de Cruz Lizarraga	
August 27	"Me Va A Pesar"	La Arrolladora Banda el Limón de René Camacho	
September 3	"Me Vas A Extranar"	Banda El Recodo de Cruz Lizarraga	
September 10	"Fuiste Mia"	Gerardo Ortíz	
September 17	"Me Vas A Extranar"	Banda El Recodo de Cruz Lizarraga	
September 24	"Amor Del Bueno"	Calibre 50	
October 1	"Amor Del Bueno"	Calibre 50	
October 8	"Amor Del Bueno"	Calibre 50	
October 15	"Yo Si Enamore"	La Septima Banda	
October 22	"Yo Si Enamore"	La Septima Banda	
October 29	"Yo Si Enamore"	La Septima Banda	
November 5	"Yo Si Enamore"	La Septima Banda	
November 12	"Tengo Que Colgor"	Banda El Recodo de Cruz Lizarraga	
November 19	"Tengo Que Colgor"	Banda El Recodo de Cruz Lizarraga	
November 26	"Tengo Que Colgor"	Banda El Recodo de Cruz Lizarraga	
December 3	"Tengo Que Colgor"	Banda El Recodo de Cruz Lizarraga	
December 10	"Tengo Que Colgor"	Banda El Recodo de Cruz Lizarraga	
December 17	"Tengo Que Colgor"	Banda El Recodo de Cruz Lizarraga	
December 24	"Tengo Que Colgor"	Banda El Recodo de Cruz Lizarraga	
December 31	"Tengo Que Colgor"	Banda El Recodo de Cruz Lizarraga	
