= Los Invasores de Nuevo León =

Mexican Norteño set

Los Invasores de Nuevo León are a Mexican norteño band founded in 1977. The first members of the group was Eduardo "Lalo" Mora, Isidro "Chilo" Rodríguez, Luis González, Leo Márquez, Damián Ochoa, Mario Lara, César Domínguez, Mario Avena, Diego Lucero and Rubén García.

Javier Ríos was the accordionist of Luis y Julián before joining Los Invasores de Nuevo León. He joined Lalo Mora, Homero de León and Eliud López. The group would become very popular on both sides of the Texas–Mexico border during the 1980s and 1990s. Many of their songs are still played on radio to this day, such as Laurita Garza, Eslabón por Eslabón, Ni Dada La Quiero, Amor a la Ligera, Ni Que Tuvieras Tanta Suerte, Playa Sola, Aguanta Corazón, Mi Casa Nueva and A Mí que Me Quedo. Lead vocalist Lalo Mora left for a solo career with EMI Records in 1993. The group's songs have included political themes, and criticism of U.S. involvement in Latin America.

== Members ==
- Javier Ríos (accordion and secondary vocals) (1980–present)
- Eliud López (drums) (1980–present)
- Rolando Marroquín (lead vocalist) (1997–present)
- Javier Benavides (animator) (2000–present)
- Jairo García (bass guitar) (2023–present)
- Francisco Ríos (bajo sexto) (2014–present)

== Former members ==
- Eduardo "Lalo" Mora (bajo sexto and 1 lead vocals) (1980–1993)
- Homero de León + (bass guitar) (1980–2013)
- Isaías Lucero (bajo sexto and 2 lead vocals) (1993–1996)
- Rigo Marroquín (bajo sexto) (1997–2012)
- Ángel Hernández (bajo sexto and accordion) (2012–2022)
- Luis Perales (bass guitar) (2014–2023)
- rogelio pedraza(bajo sexto and 3 lead vocals)

== Studio albums ==
- El Puente Roto (1980)
- Laurita Garza (1980)
- Concha del Alma (1981)
- Castígame (1981)
- Ni Dada La Quiero (1982)
- Mi Flor de Naranjo (1982)
- Aguanta Corazón (1983)
- Amor a la Ligera (1983)
- El Preso de Nuevo León (1984)
- Cariño (1984)
- Camino Equivocado (1985)
- Que Valor de Mujer (1985)
- Corridos de Pegue (1986)
- De Ser Tu Dueño (1986)
- Lupe Ruvalcaba (1987)
- Mil Pedazos (1987)
- Trono Caído (1988)
- Bajo Mil Llaves (1988)
- Es Demasiado Tarde (1989)
- La Ley del Corrido (1989)
- Corazón de Piedra (1990)
- Te Llevaste Lo Mejor (1990)
- 15 Boleros de Oro (1991)
- 15 Boleros de Oro Vol. 2 (1991)
- 20 Corridos Fregones (1992)
- Embárgame a Mi (1993)
- Ventanas al Viento (1994)
- Me Rindo (1995)
- Jardín del Amor (1996)
- Corridos de Alto Poder (1996)
- Leyendas (1997)
- Vuelvo Contigo (1998)
- De Vida o Muerte (1999)
- Boleros (2000)
- Tiempo al Tiempo (2001)
- Hasta el Final (2002)
- 15 Clásicos al Estilo de Los Invasores de Nuevo León (2003)
- Señal de Alerta (2004)
- Los Más Buscados (2005)
- Corridos de Peligro (2006)
- No Soy de Palo (2007)
- Con Tal de Que Me Olvides (2008)
- Amor Aventurero (2009)
- Déjate Llevar (2010)
- 30 Aniversario en vivo (2011)
- Aferrado al Amor (2012)
- El Reencuentro Vol. 1 en vivo (2013)
- El Reencuentro Vol. 2 en vivo (2013)
- Amistades (2014)
- Mi Héroe (2015)
- Sin Presumir (2016)
- No. 50 (2017)
- Otra Era (2018)
- Del Corazón a la Piel (2019)
- Con Invitados a Otro Nivel Vol. 1 (2020)
- 40 Aniversario (Vol. 1, Vol. 2, Vol. 3) (live) (2021)

== Compilation albums ==
- 15 Éxitos
- 15 Éxitos Vol. 2
- 15 Éxitos Vol. 3
- 12 Éxitos Norteños
- 12 Éxitos Norteños Vol. 2
- Corridos con... Los Invasores de Nuevo León
- La Historia
- Mix
- La Historia Vol. 2
- 20 Corridos Fregones Vol. 2
- Ayer, Hoy y Siempre
- Quedate en Casa... Grandes Éxitos
- Las Más Pegadas
