= Historias de La Calle =

Historia de La Calle

Studio album by Calibre 50
- Released: November 20, 2015
- Length: 46:21
- Label: Andaluz Music

Calibre 50 chronology
Siempre Contigo (2014)	Historia de La Calle (2015)	Desde el rancho (2016)

Historias de la Calle (Stories of the Street) is a studio album by regional Mexican band Calibre 50. It was released in November 2015 under Andaluz Music.

== Track listing ==
No.	Title	Length
1.	"El Amor No Fue pa' Mi"	3:46
2.	"Préstamela a Mi"	3:35
3.	"Ganó Holanda, Perdió China"	3:01
4.	"Qué Bonita Tú"	3:23
5.	"Amor Limosnero"	4:01
6.	"Buscando la Manera"	3:03
7.	"Cumbia Reggae"	3:52
8.	"Llorando y Tomando"	3:02
9.	"Alineando Cabrones"	5:18
10.	"Ahora Va la Mía"	2:29
11.	"Todo Contigo"	2:37
12.	"Dueles"	3:15
13.	"Se Volvió a Pelar Mi Apá"	2:36
14.	"La Gripa"	2:23

== Charts ==
=== Weekly charts ===
Chart (2015)	Peak position
US Billboard 200	136
US Top Latin Albums (Billboard)	1
US Regional Mexican Albums (Billboard)	1

=== Year-end charts ===
Chart (2016)	Position
US Top Latin Albums (Billboard)	24

== Certifications ==
Region	Certification	Certified units/sales
United States (RIAA)	Platinum (Latin)	60,000^{‡}
^{‡} Sales+streaming figures based on certification alone.

== Accolades ==
Publication	Accolade	Rank	Ref.
Premio Lo Nuestro (2017)	Best Regional Album	Nominated	
