= C-Kan =

Mexican singer and rapper

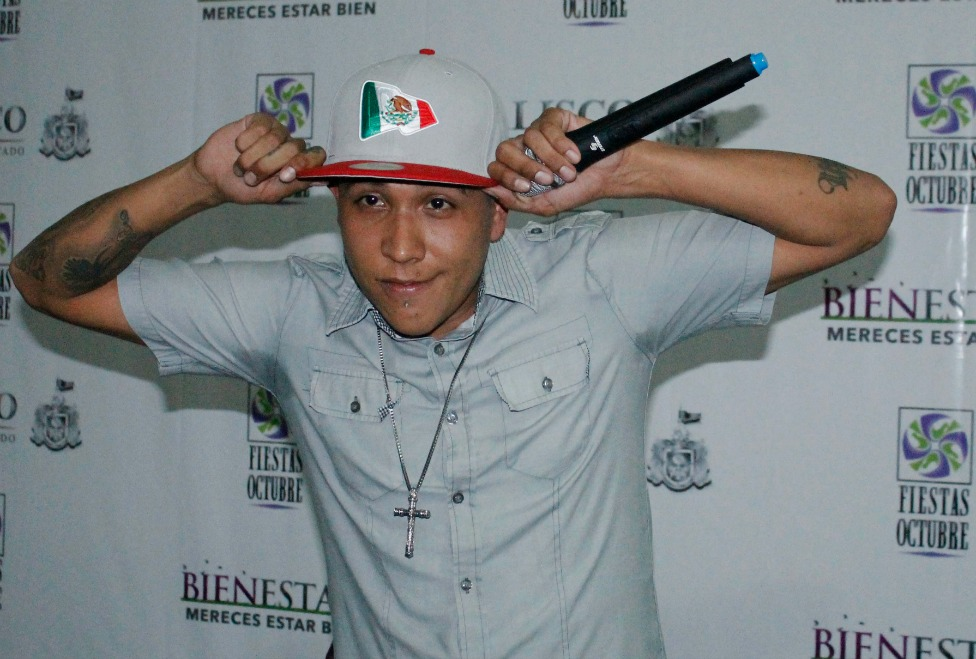

Background information
- Born: José Luis Maldonado Ramos; 26 July 1987 (age 39)
- Genres: Hip hop; trap; gangsta rap; reggaeton; reggae
- Occupations: Singer; songwriter; rapper
- Instrument: Vocals
- Years active: 2008–present
- Label: Mastered Trax Latino [es]

José Luis Maldonado Ramos (born 26 July 1987), better known by his stage name C-Kan, is a Mexican singer, songwriter and rapper signed to Mastred Trax since 2012. He became popular in 2012 through his success on social networks, with his demo "Voy Por El Sueño De Muchos" (2012) "Classification C, Vol. 1" (2014). "Vivo La Vida Cantando" is the title of the first single from his second album, entitled Clasificación C. In 2015, C-Kan released his third album entitled "Clasificacion C, Vol. 2". HMexiCKanos was released on 20 November 2016 in physical format in Mexico and digital format (on iTunes).

C-Kan has over 5 million subscribers on its YouTube channel and over 100 million views. He worked with artists such as MC Davo, Dharius, Santa Fe Klan, Gera MX, B-Real, Don Dinero, Don Cheto, Lil Rob, T Lopez, Chingo Bling, Baby Bash, SPM, King Lil G, 50 Cent, MC Magic, Pipo Ti, Al2 El Aldeano, Kinto Sol, Fermín IV and Sick Jacken.

== Career ==
C-Kan began rapping when he was a teenager, rhyming about life in the streets, gangs, drugs and violence. His first group mixtape, 'Get Money', released in 2006. That same year his first individual mixtape arrived: ‘Déjenme Afinar los Gallos’.

In 2007, he released his second mixtape, called "Siluetas del Rap", and a few months after, he released "Déjame Afilar Los Gallos". Following this h was signed by Mastered Trax Latino. Along with fellow rappers, Bodka37 and Masibo, C-Kan formed a group called Radikales, releasing their first single "La Rebelión de un Sueño" by the end of 2007.

For the following years, he focused on new singles and improving his onstage performance. He attracted attention through his music videos posted on YouTube, as well as appearances on Mexican news programs where he spoke about the social issues in his lyrics.

=== 2012–2015 ===
C-Kan signed to Mastered Trax Latino in 2012, and released his first album: Voy por el sueño de muchos. Two years later he released his second album as part of Mastered Trax, titled Clasificación C, followed by Clasificación C, Vol. 2 (2015).

In 2015, C-Kan and Julión Álvarez were the only two Mexican artists promoted through Tidal after the music-service launched its platform in Mexico. Popular songs from Clasificación C, Vol. 2 were performed via livestream on 29 October 2015 at Auditorio Benito Juárez.

=== 2016–present ===
C-Kan made his debut as a soundtrack composer in 2016 for Pantelion Films newest movie, Compadres. On 1 July 2016, he released the album, Antes de Todo.

He was among the more than 60 performers at Budweiser's two-day "Made in America" festival in 2016.

On 26 May 2017 he released a collaboration album with Pipo Ti [es] called Días de sol [es].

C-Kan appeared alongside Tanque, Menuda Coincidencia, Beast Jin, Serko Fu, Tino El Penguin, Aczino, and Mike Díaz in Kyzza Terrazas' documentary Somos lengua, covering the growth of rap and hip-hop in Mexico. The documentary premiered at the Urbanworld Film Festival in New York 22 September 2017.

In 2020, C-Kan signed with 33 & West for exclusive representation in the U.S. and Canada.

He released the album Mi Cancion in 2021.

C-Kan performed in Houston with Santa Fe Klan on 16 March 2022. He also toured with MC Davo and Dharius from 30 August 2022 to 14 October 2022.

On 30 September 2023, the song Por Mi México (Remix), a collaboration between Lefty Sm and Santa Fe Klan, and featuring Dharius, C-Kan, MCDavo, and Neto Peña, peaked at number 29 on the Billboard Hot Latin Songs chart. It had debuted at number 7 in Latin Digital song sales. The music video reached number 14 on YouTube Music's Top Videos in Mexico for the week of 8—14 March 2024.

For the week of 15 March — 21 March 2024, C-Kan was at number 64 on the YouTube Music Mexico Most popular Streaming Artists Chart.

== Musical style ==
Maldonado states his musical influences are reggaeton & rap. Maldonado stated that his biggest influences are rappers like Control Machete, Cypress Hill, Dyablo, Magisterio, Caballeros del Plan G, Gamberroz, Big Boy and Vico C.

Maldonado's music has been known as "reggaetonero" and "romantic rapper". Most of his songs are often used autotune.

== Personal life ==
C-Kan was born and raised in the city of Guadalajara. At the age of 12 his father died, and he began making a life on the streets of Guadalajara. Alongside crime and violence, rap was also part of his life, and at 16, Ramos Maldonado discovered his talent for it. He is also father of a child.

=== Politics ===
He has stated that the violence he talks about in his music is a reflection of real life that is a direct result of "poverty and the lack of education".

C-Kan is also known for supporting the free use of marijuana in México. In an interview for the Costa Rican newspaper La Nación, he admitted using it, and claimed that public opinion will change as he believes misinformation is responsible for the current attitude toward the use of marijuana.

C-Kan has stated that he believes the government of Mexico is manipulating the public through the news media, praising social media as a vehicle for allowing people to obtain information the government would prefer they not have. He specifically cites the incidents of the Iguala mass kidnapping, and the incident in which the Federal Police killed protestors in Apatzingán. He has also expressed concern with the distribution of wealth in Mexico.

In 2016, C-Kan publicly stated that he would not enter the United States as long as Donald Trump remained President in direct response to the disparaging comments Trump made regarding Mexicans.

== Tours ==
- MC Davo vs C-Kan
- Dos Tipos de Cuidado
- Días de Sol
- Dharius
- ICE Cube

List of concerts, show data, city, country, place, opening acts.
Day	City	country	place	Opening act
North America
19 de diciembre de 2015	Valle de Chalco	México	Gimnasio Municipal Luis Donaldo Colosio.	—
24 de enero de 2016	Córdoba	México	—	—
07 de febrero de 2016	San Luis Potosí	México	—	—
14 de febrero de 2016	Guadalajara	México	—	—
20 de febrero de 2016	Torreón	México	Blvd. Revolución y Vasconcelos	—
21 de febrero de 2016	Monterrey	México	Escena Monterrey	—
27 de febrero de 2016	Ciudad de México	México	Calzada, La Viga	—
10 de abril de 2016	Los Reyes	México	El Paraiso del Abuelo	—
03 de diciembre de 2016	Hermosillo	México	Auditorio CEUNO	—
04 de diciembre de 2016	Monterrey	México	Escena Monterrey	—
08 de julio de 2017	Cuautitlán Izcalli	México	—	—
30 July 2017	Guadalajara	México	"Salón Bugambilias"	—
09 de septiembre de 2017	Puebla, Puebla	México	"Salón de Convenciones Serdán"	

- Urbano Fest

List of concerts, show data, city, country, place, notes.
Day	City	Country	place	Note(s)
09 de octubre de 2013	Guadalajara	México		First urban fest, first rapper in the Fiestas de Octubre.
21 de octubre de 2014	Guadalajara	México	—	—
29 de octubre de 2015	Guadalajara	México	—	third city in Guadalajara.
31 October 2015	Ciudad de México	México	Pepsi Center	second urban of 2015, 2 times bigger, first in CDMX.

- Mi Canción Tour USA 2022, with Santa Fe Klan

List of concerts, show data, city, country, venue, notes.
Day	City	Country	Venue	Note(s)
11 March 2022	San Antonio, TX	United States of America	Aztec Theatre	
12 March 2022	McAllen, TX	United States of America	McAllen Performing Arts Center	
15 March 2022	Dallas, TX	United States of America	House of Blues	
16 March 2022	Houston, TX	United States of America	House of Blues	with Santa Fe Klan
17 March 2022	El Paso, TX	United States of America	Plaza Theatre	
19 March 2022	Tucson, AZ	United States of America	Encore	
22 March 2022	Santa Ana, CA	United States of America	The Observatory	
23 March 2022	Los Angeles, CA	United States of America	The Belasco	
25 March 2022	San Diego, CA	United States of America	House of Blues	
26 March 2022	Fresno, CA	United States of America	Strummer's	with Arce MX
27 March 2022	Las Vegas, NV	United States of America	House of Blues	
3 April 2022	Portland, OR	United States of America	Bossanova Ballroom	with Young Micah, Lil Espy, Dopamine, Cuddie Whompus

- LiveNation USA Tour 2022, with MC Davo and Dharius

List of concerts, show data, city, country, venue, notes.
Day	City	Country	Venue	Note(s)
30 August 2022	San Jose, CA	United States of America	The Ritz	
31 August 2022	Sacramento, CA	United States of America	Ace of Spades	
2 September 2022	Portland, OR	United States of America	Roseland Theater	
3 September 2022	Seattle, WA	United States of America	Neptune	
5 September 2022	Boise, ID	United States of America	Knitting Factory	(not a LiveNation venue)
6 September 2022	Salt Lake City, UT	United States of America	The Depot	
8 September 2022	Denver, CO	United States of America	Summit	
9 September 2022	Omaha, NE	United States of America	The Admiral	(not a LiveNation venue)
10 September 2022	Minneapolis, MN	United States of America	Varsity Theater	
11 September 2022	Chicago, IL	United States of America	House of Blues	
12 September 2022	Milwaukee, WI	United States of America	The Rave	(not a LiveNation venue)
13 September 2022	Grand Rapids, MI	United States of America	Intersection	
14 September 2022	Indianapolis, IN	United States of America	Deluxe at Old National Centre	
15 September 2022	Buffalo, NY	United States of America	Iron Works	(not a LiveNation venue)
16 September 2022	Boston, MA	United States of America	The Paradise Rock Club	
17 September 2022	New York, NY	United States of America	Irving Plaza	
18 September 2022	Philadelphia, PA	United States of America	Theatre of Living Arts	
21 September 2022	Washington, DC	United States of America	Union Stage	
22 September 2022	Raleigh, NC	United States of America	The Ritz	
23 September 2022	Atlanta, GA	United States of America	Buckhead Theatre	
24 September 2022	Lake Buena Vista, FL	United States of America	House of Blues	
25 September 2022	Miami, FL	United States of America	La Scala de Miami	(not a LiveNation venue)
26 September 2022	Jacksonville, FL	United States of America	Underbelly	(not a LiveNation venue)
27 September 2022	Birmingham, AL	United States of America	MegaSol	(not a LiveNation venue)
28 September 2022	Memphis, TN	United States of America	Blue Moon Event Center	(not a LiveNation venue)
29 September 2022	New Orleans, LA	United States of America	Parish at House of Blues	
30 September 2022	Laredo, TX	United States of America	Club C	(not a LiveNation venue)
1 October 2022	Mission, TX	United States of America	La Catedral	
2 October 2022	San Antonio, TX	United States of America	The Aztec Theater	
3 October 2022	Houston, TX	United States of America	Warehouse Live	(not a LiveNation venue)
5 October 2022	Dallas, TX	United States of America	The Echo Lounge and Music Hall	
6 October 2022	El Paso, TX	United States of America	Lowbrow Palace	
9 October 2022	San Diego, CA	United States of America	House of Blues	
11 October 2022	Phoenix, AZ	United States of America	Crescent Ballroom	
12 October 2022	Santa Ana, CA	United States of America	Observatory OC	
13 October 2022	Las Vegas, NV	United States of America	House of Blues	
14 October 2022	Los Angeles, CA	United States of America	Belasco	

== Discography ==
=== Albums ===
Títle	Details	Positions	Positions
Títle	Details	USA	MEX
Voy Por El Sueño de Muchos	Launching: 10 December 2012; Label: Mastered Trax Latino; Formats: CD, Music download	—	iTunes 1
Clasificación C, Vol. 1	Launching: 21 July 2014; Label: Mastered Trax Latino; Formats: CD, Music download	Billboard; Top Latin Albums, 42; Latin Rhythm Albums, 3	—
Clasificación C, Vol. 2	Launching: 16 March 2015; Label: Mastered Trax Latino; Formats: CD, Music download	Billboard; Top Latin Albums, 28; Latin Rhythm Albums, 5	—
Antes de Todo	Launching: 30 June 2016; Label: Mastered Trax Latino; Formats: CD, Music download; Deluxe Edition release same day	Billboard; Latin Rhythm Albums, 6	—
MexiCKanos	Launching: 19 November 2016; Label: Mastered Trax Latino; Formats: CD, Music download	Billboard; Top Latin Albums, 24; Latin Rhythm Albums, 3	—
Días de Sol with Pipo Ti	Launching: 25 May 2017; Label: Mastered Trax Latino; Formats: CD, Music download	—	—
Greatest Hits	Launching: 1 November 2018; Label: Mastered Trax Latino; Formats: CD, Music download	—	—
Baúl	Launching: 5 November 2020; Label: Mastered Trax Latino; Formats: CD, Music download	—	—
Mi Canción	Launching: 19 August 2021; Label: Mastered Trax Latino; Formats: CD, Music download	—	—
Baúl 2	Launching 7 December 2023; Label: Mastered Trax Latino; Formats: CD, Music download	—	—

=== Music videos ===
70 as lead artist, 49 collaborations, 10 simple.
Release date	Song	featuring.	Álbum	Recording(s)
23 de julio de 2010	La Cosa Esta Dura	Lil Jock, Kala, Soldis	—	División Mayúscula
15 de junio de 2011	Me Enrede En La Calle	Agva	—	—
19 de mayo de 2012	No Puedo Vivir Sin Verte	—	Voy por el sueño de muchos	Mastered Trax Latino
21 de octubre de 2012	Me Pongo Joker	—	—	Lunapsis Films
28 de octubre de 2012	Rafagas	Kapel Da Most, Zimple	Voy Por El Sueño de Muchos	Mastered Trax Latino
04 de noviembre de 2012	Mexicanos Al Grito de Guerra	Quetzal	Voy Por El Sueño de Muchos	Mastered Trax Latino
07 de noviembre de 2012	Ten La Tuya	—	Voy Por El Sueño de Muchos	Mastered Trax Latino
11 de diciembre de 2012	¿Dónde Estan?	—	Voy Por El Sueño de Muchos	Mastered Trax Latino
21 de diciembre de 2012	M.E.X.I.C.O.	—	Voy Por El Sueño de Muchos	Mastered Trax Latino
30 January 2013	Mi Música Es Un Arma	Zimple, MC Davo	Voy Por El Sueño de Muchos	Mastered Trax Latino
07 de febrero de 2013	Somos de Barrio	Togwy	Voy Por El Sueño de Muchos	Mastered Trax Latino
26 de febrero de 2013	Esta Vida Me Encanta	Zimple, Don Aero	Voy Por El Sueño de Muchos	Mastered Trax Latino
28 de febrero de 2013	Te Lloré	—	Voy Por El Sueño de Muchos	Mastered Trax Latino
13 de marzo de 2013	No Puedo Vivir Sin Verte	—	Voy Por El Sueño de Muchos	Mastered Trax Latino
04 de abril de 2013	Embotellado	Don Kalavera	Voy Por El Sueño de Muchos	Mastered Trax Latino
20 de abril de 2013	Vuelve	MC Davo	Voy Por El Sueño de Muchos	Mastered Trax Latino
29 de mayo de 2013	Déjame Conocerte	—	Voy Por El Sueño de Muchos	Mastered Trax Latino
26 de junio de 2013	Voy Por El Sueño de Muchos	—	Voy Por El Sueño de Muchos	Mastered Trax Latino
24 de julio de 2013	La Vida No La Tienes Comprada	Zimple	Voy Por El Sueño de Muchos	Mastered Trax Latino
05 de septiembre de 2013	Guerreros	Iluminatik	Voy Por El Sueño de Muchos	Mastered Trax Latino
24 de septiembre de 2013	Me Gusta La Calle	Prynce El Armamento	Voy Por El Sueño de Muchos	Mastered Trax Latino
08 de octubre de 2013	Sexy	Rigo Luna	Voy Por El Sueño de Muchos	Mastered Trax Latino
30 October 2013	Ya No Tiene Caso	Zimple, Javier La Amenaza	Voy Por El Sueño de Muchos	Mastered Trax Latino
22 de noviembre de 2013	Vivo La Vida Cantando	—	Clasificación C, Vol. 1	Mastered Trax Latino
29 de noviembre de 2013	Disculpa	Don Kalavera	Voy por el sueño de muchos	Mastered Trax Latino
24 de enero de 2014	Se Juntarón Las Mafias	Zimple, Asek	—	Mastered Trax Latino
11 de marzo de 2014	Latinos Unidos	Lil Rob	Clasificación C, Vol. 1	Mastered Trax Latino
08 de abril de 2014	Quiero Que Sepas	MC Magic	Clasificación C, Vol. 1	Mastered Trax Latino
30 April 2014	Justicia	Arianna Puello	Clasificación C, Vol. 1	Mastered Trax Latino
28 de mayo de 2014	Los Que Nadie Quiere	Zimple	Clasificación C, Vol. 1	Mastered Trax Latino
04 de agosto de 2014	Si No Estás	T Lopez	Clasificación C, Vol. 1	Mastered Trax Latino
12 de agosto de 2014	Eres Para Mí	Sporty Loco, T Lopez	Clasificación C, Vol. 1	Mastered Trax Latino
14 de septiembre de 2014	La Calle Sabe De Mi Nombre	—	Clasificación C, Vol. 1	Mastered Trax Latino
07 de octubre de 2014	Cuando El Amor Se Acaba	Prynce El Armamento	Clasificación C, Vol. 1	Mastered Trax Latino
05 de noviembre de 2014	Ayer, Hoy & Mañana	—	Clasificación C, Vol. 1	Mastered Trax Latino
02 de diciembre de 2014	Viajando En Una Nube	Pipo Ti	Clasificación C, Vol. 1	Mastered Trax Latino
23 de diciembre de 2014	Yo Soy Quien Soy	T Lopez	Clasificación C, Vol. 1	Mastered Trax Latino
30 December 2014	Un Par De Balas	—	Clasificación C, Vol. 1	Mastered Trax Latino
27 de enero de 2015	Por El Mexicano	Sporty Loco	Clasificación C, Vol. 2	Mastered Trax Latino
17 de febrero de 2015	Todo Lo Que Brilla No Es Oro	Don Dinero, Charlie Cruz	Clasificación C, Vol. 2	Mastered Trax Latino
16 de marzo de 2015	Intolerable	—	Clasificación C, Vol. 2	Mastered Trax Latino
21 de abril de 2015	Aparece	Pipo Ti	Clasificación C, Vol. 2	Mastered Trax Latino
19 de mayo de 2015	My Everything	Damon Reel	Clasificación C, Vol. 2	Mastered Trax Latino
07 de julio de 2015	Mamá Me Dijo Un Día	—	Clasificación C, Vol. 2	Mastered Trax Latino
14 de agosto de 2015	Mujer Bonita	MC Magic	Clasificación C, Vol. 2	Mastered Trax Latino
16 de septiembre de 2015	¿Quién Contra Mí?	—	Clasificación C, Vol. 2	Mastered Trax Latino
26 de octubre de 2015	Mi Todo	Damon Reel	—	Mastered Trax Latino
26 de noviembre de 2015	Ya Hago Rap	—	—	Mastered Trax Latino
29 de noviembre de 2015	Te Vas	Crooked Stilo	The Take Over, Vol. 1	Mastered Trax Latino
18 de diciembre de 2015	Round 1	MC Davo	—	Mastered Trax Latino
01 de febrero de 2016	Carta de Amor	Javier La Amenaza	The Take Over, Vol. 2	Mastered Trax Latino
26 de febrero de 2016	Round 2	MC Davo	—	Mastered Trax Latino
22 de marzo de 2016	Maria	—	The Take Over, Vol. 2	Mastered Trax Latino
29 de marzo de 2016	Compadres	—	The Take Over, Vol. 2	Mastered Trax Latino
11 de abril de 2016	Ted	—	—	Mastered Trax Latino
27 de mayo de 2016	¿Cómo Le Digo?	Derian	The Take Over, Vol. 2	Mastered Trax Latino
01 de julio de 2016	Jodanse Colegas	—	Antes de todo	Mastered Trax Latino
19 de agosto de 2016	La Música Es Música, La Calle Es Calle	Snoopy, Refye El Demonio	MexiCKanos	Mastered Trax Latino
02 de septiembre de 2016	Pesadilla de Amor	Prynce El Armamento	—	Make Money Records
16 de septiembre de 2016	Esta Noche	Derian	The Take Over, Vol. 2	Mastered Trax Latino
21 de octubre de 2016	No Te Me Vayas	Melodico	Antes de todo	Mastered Trax Latino
20 de noviembre de 2016	Ando	Refye El Demonio, Ruff	MexiCKanos	Mastered Trax Latino
25 de diciembre de 2016	Fuego Cruzado	Eslok Diaz	MexiCKanos	Mastered Trax Latino
17 de febrero de 2016	C-Kan Pachino & Concrete De Niro	Concrete, Bz Bwai	The Take Over, Vol. 2	Mastered Trax Latino
31 March 2017	Cae La Ley	HomeBoys	MexiCKanos	Mastered Trax Latino
31 March 2017	Me Pones A Volar	Prynce El Armamento	—	Make Money Records
28 de abril de 2017	Narcos	Ill Mascaras	MexiCKanos	Mastered Trax Latino
26 de mayo de 2017	De Que Me Sirve	Pipo Ti	Días de sol	Mastered Trax Latino
05 de julio de 2017	Tú Y Yo	Pipo Ti	Días de sol	Mastered Trax Latino
