= List of number-one albums of 2014 (Mexico) =

Top 100 Mexico is a record chart published weekly by AMPROFON (Asociación Mexicana de Productores de Fonogramas y Videogramas), a non-profit organization composed by Mexican and multinational record companies. This association tracks record sales (physical and digital) in Mexico. Since May 2013, some positions of the chart are published in the official Twitter account of AMPROFON including the number one position.

== Chart history ==
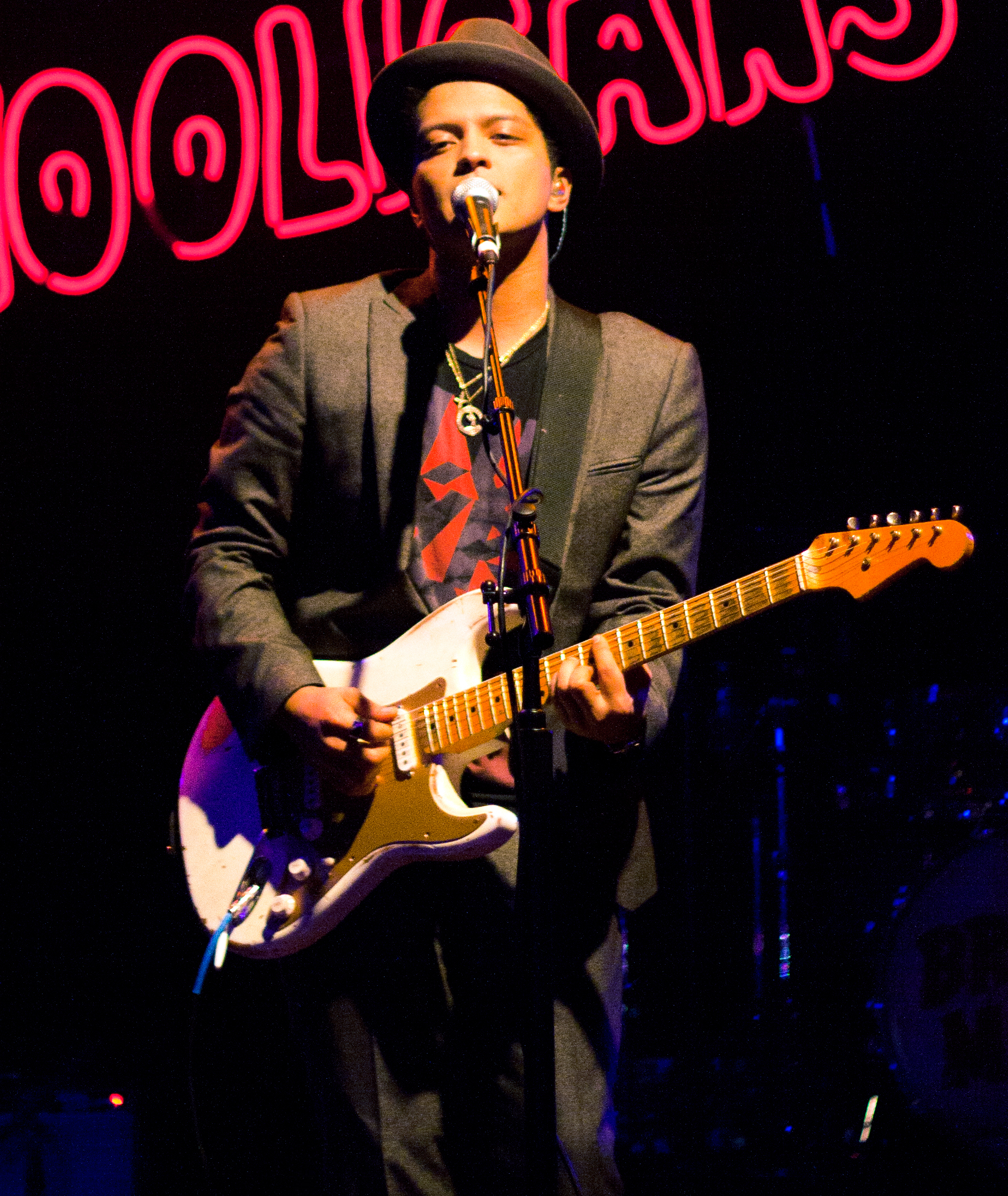
Unorthodox Jukebox by American recording artist Bruno Mars reach the number one in Mexico after his performance in the Super Bowl XLVIII halftime show.

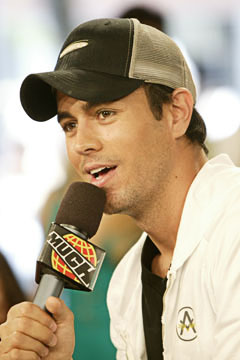
Enrique Iglesias's album, Sex and Love debuted at No. 1 with platinum sales.

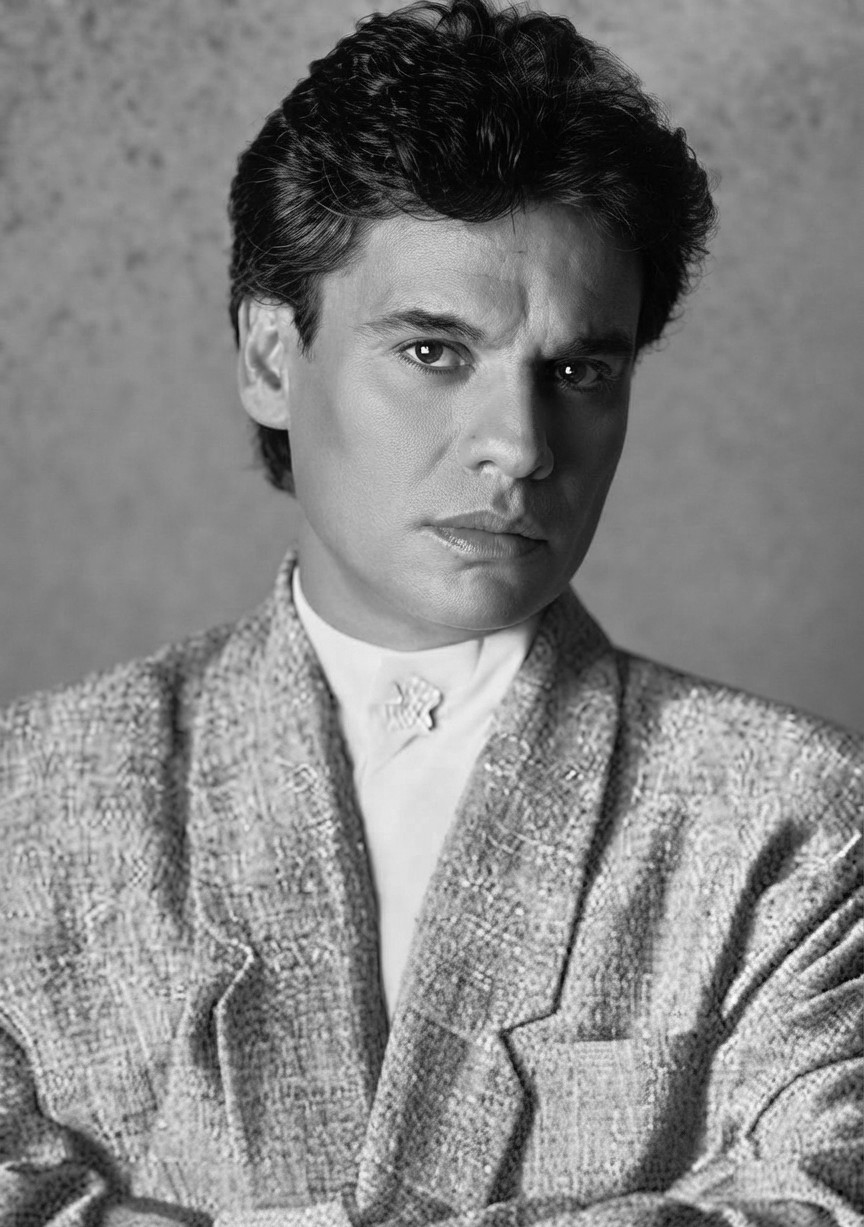
The live album Mis 40 en Bellas Artes by Juan Gabriel was the second best-selling album with 300,000 copies in 2014.

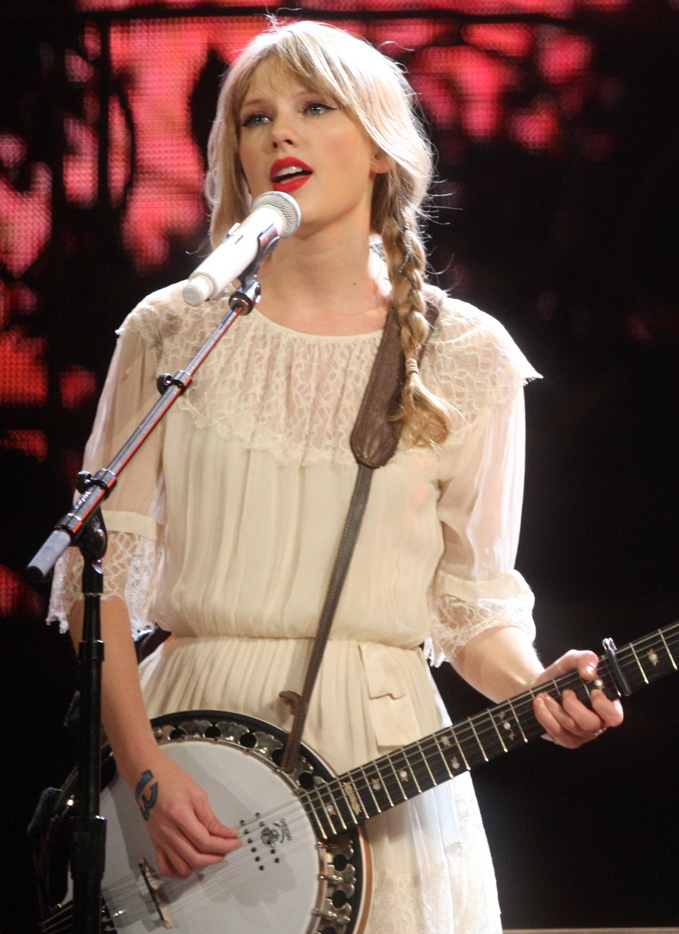
1989 by Taylor Swift was her first album to reach number one in Mexico.

The yellow background indicates the best-performing album of 2014.

Chart date	Album	Artist	Reference
January 5	Midnight Memories	One Direction	
January 12	Midnight Memories	One Direction	
January 19	La Guzmán: Primera Fila	Alejandra Guzmán	
January 26	La Guzmán: Primera Fila	Alejandra Guzmán	
February 2	La Guzmán: Primera Fila	Alejandra Guzmán	
February 9	Unorthodox Jukebox	Bruno Mars	
February 16	Unorthodox Jukebox	Bruno Mars	
February 23	Cómo Te Voy a Olvidar	Los Ángeles Azules	
March 2	Cómo Te Voy a Olvidar	Los Ángeles Azules	
March 9	Formula, Vol. 2	Romeo Santos	
March 16	Cómo Te Voy a Olvidar	Los Ángeles Azules	
March 23	Sex and Love	Enrique Iglesias	
March 30	Cómo Te Voy a Olvidar	Los Ángeles Azules	
April 6	Cómo Te Voy a Olvidar	Los Ángeles Azules	
April 13	Cómo Te Voy a Olvidar	Los Ángeles Azules	
April 20	Cómo Te Voy a Olvidar	Los Ángeles Azules	
April 27	Cómo Te Voy a Olvidar	Los Ángeles Azules	
May 4	Cómo Te Voy a Olvidar	Los Ángeles Azules	
May 11	Mis 40 en Bellas Artes	Juan Gabriel	
May 18	Mis 40 en Bellas Artes	Juan Gabriel	
May 25	Ghost Stories	Coldplay	
June 1	Mis 40 en Bellas Artes	Juan Gabriel	
June 8	Mis 40 en Bellas Artes	Juan Gabriel	
June 15	Cómo Te Voy a Olvidar	Los Ángeles Azules	
June 22	Ultraviolence	Lana Del Rey	
June 29	Mis 40 en Bellas Artes	Juan Gabriel	
July 6	Cómo Te Voy a Olvidar	Los Ángeles Azules	
July 13	Cómo Te Voy a Olvidar	Los Ángeles Azules	
July 20	Cómo Te Voy a Olvidar	Los Ángeles Azules	
July 27	Cómo Te Voy a Olvidar	Los Ángeles Azules	
August 3	Cómo Te Voy a Olvidar	Los Ángeles Azules	
August 10	Cómo Te Voy a Olvidar	Los Ángeles Azules	
August 17	Cómo Te Voy a Olvidar	Los Ángeles Azules	
August 24	El Dominio	MC DAVO	
August 31	En Todo Estaré	Chayanne	
September 7	Cómo Te Voy a Olvidar	Los Ángeles Azules	
September 14	Cómo Te Voy a Olvidar	Los Ángeles Azules	
September 21	Cómo Te Voy a Olvidar	Los Ángeles Azules	
September 28	Cómo Te Voy a Olvidar	Los Ángeles Azules	
October 5	CD9	CD9	
October 12	Primera Fila Flans	Ilse, Ivonne & Mimi	
October 19	Primera Fila Flans	Ilse, Ivonne & Mimi	
October 26	Primera Fila Flans	Ilse, Ivonne & Mimi	
November 2	1989	Taylor Swift	
November 9	Amore Mio	Thalía	
November 16	Primera Fila - Hecho Realidad	Ha*Ash	
November 23	Four	One Direction	
November 30	Four	One Direction	
December 7	Four	One Direction	
December 14	Confidencias Reales	Alejandro Fernández	
December 21	Confidencias Reales	Alejandro Fernández	
December 28	Confidencias Reales	Alejandro Fernández	

== See also ==
- List of number-one songs of 2014 (Mexico)
