= MC Davo =

Mexican rapper (born 1991)

MC David
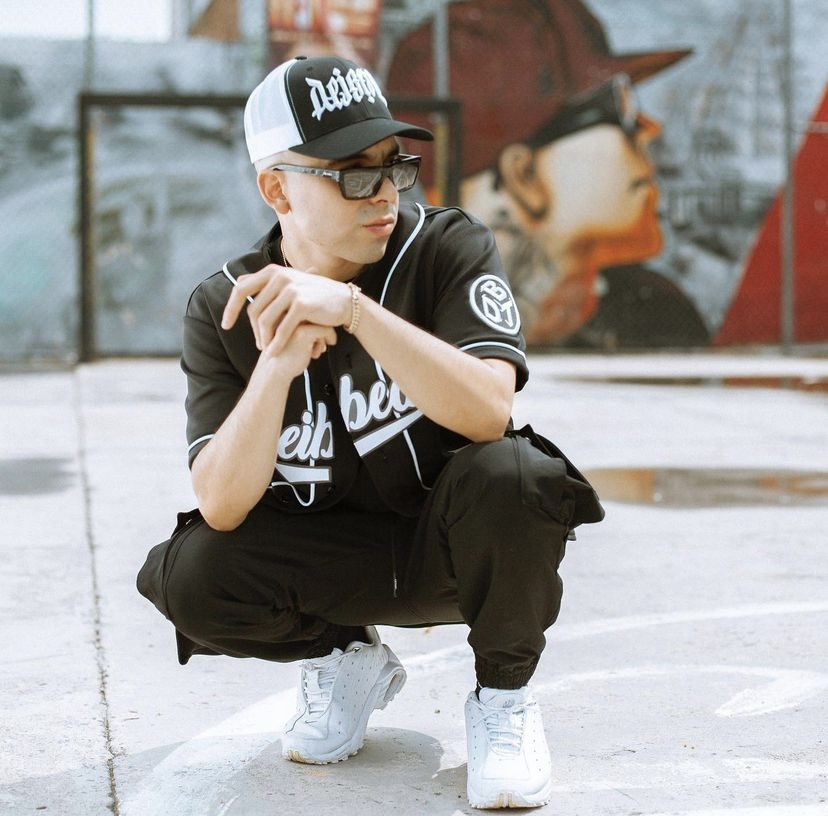

Background information
- Born: David Sierra Treviño; 30 June 1991 (age 35); Monterrey, Nuevo León, Mexico
- Genres: Hip hop; Latin trap; reggaeton; R&B; pop rap
- Occupations: Rapper; singer; songwriter
- Years active: 2009–present
- Label: Warner

David Sierra Treviño (born 30 June 1991), better known by his stage name MC Davo, is a Mexican rapper signed to Warner Music Group. He became popular in 2012 through his success in social networks, with his releases Psicosis (2012) and Psicosis II (2014), which gained millions of views on YouTube. El Dominio, his second album, was released in 2014. In 2015, MC Davo released his third album entitled El Dominio (Deluxe), which included songs like "La Propuesta", "El Mañana" and "Quimica". He has worked with artists such as C-Kan, Adán Zapata, and Darkiel.

== Awards and nominations ==
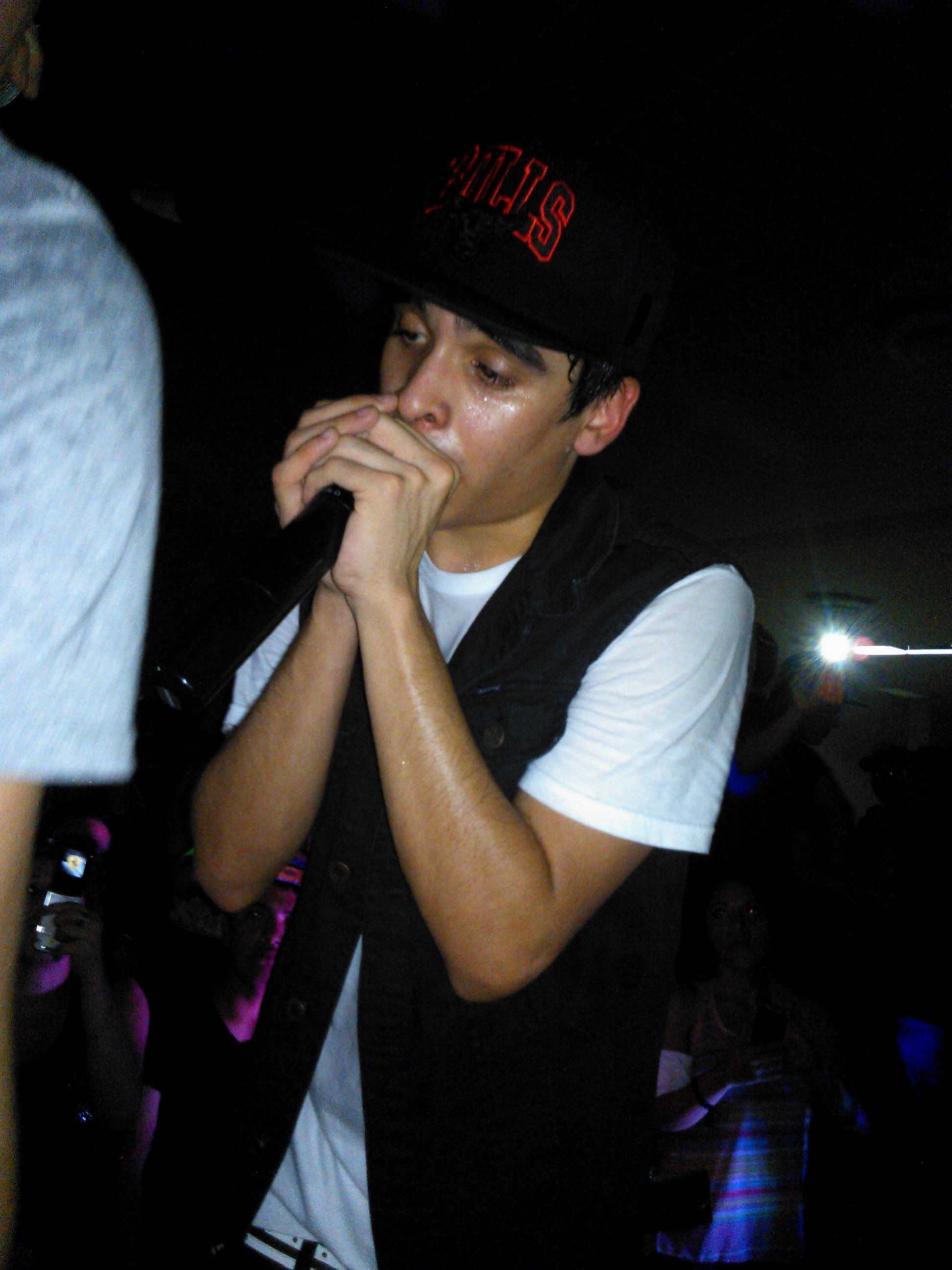
MC Davo performing in 2013

Year	Award	Category	Work	Result	Ref.
2013	Ritmo Urbano	Best Record of the Year	Psicosis II	Won	
2014	Ritmo Urbano	Best Record of the Year	El Dominio	Won	
2014	Premios Juventud	Artists with Talent to Be Your Next Favorites		Nominated	
2015	List of Polymarchs albums under Musart	Golden Disc	El Dominio	Won	

== Tours ==
- 2016: MC Davo VS C-Kan
- 2016: 2 Hombres de Cuidado ft. C-Kan

== Discography ==
=== Studio albums ===
- 2012: Psicosis
- 2014: Psicosis II
- 2015: El Dominio
- 2016 El Dominio (Deluxe)
- 2017: Las Dos Caras
