= Lalo Mora =

Mexican singer

Eduardo Mora Hernández, known simply as Lalo Mora, (born January 24, 1947, in Los Ramones, Nuevo León) is a Regional Mexican singer.

== Beginnings ==
Lalo Mora was born in Los Ramones, Nuevo León, Mexico, on January 24, 1947, under the name Eduardo Mora Hernández. He started singing in bars and was soon known around his hometown, where he made a duo known as Lupe y Lalo.

== Career ==
In 1980, he formed the famous norteño band Los Invasores de Nuevo León as their lead vocalist and bajo sexto player. He had several hits with them, including "Mi Casa Nueva" and "Laurita Garza". In 1993, he decided to pursue a solo career and became a successful artist in his own right.

As a soloist, Mora has primarily recorded songs with norteño, but has occasionally recorded songs with Sinaloan banda, mariachi, and sierreño.

In 2020, he confirmed that he acquired the COVID-19, but was now stable. He has since made a full recovery.

Mora's oldest son, Lalo Mora Jr., is the lead vocalist and bajo sexto player of norteño band Los Herederos de Nuevo León.
