= Calibre 50 =

Mexican norteño-banda group

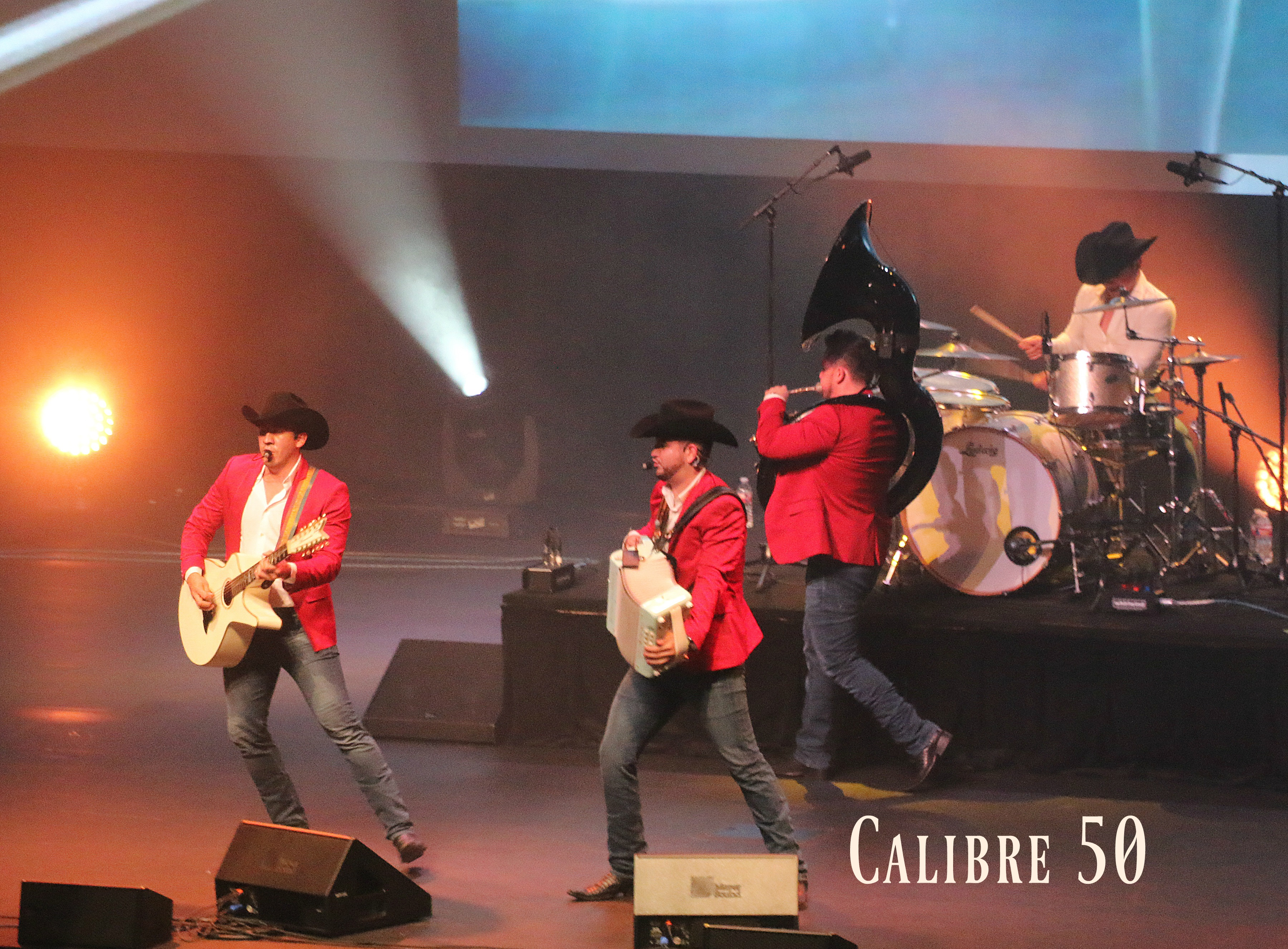
- Calibre 50 in a 2016 concert.

Background information
- Origin: Mazatlán, Sinaloa, Mexico
- Genre: Norteño-banda
- Years active: 2010-present
- Labels: Andaluz Music, Disa, Universal
- Members: Beto Gastélum; Juan Sauceda; Alejandro Gaxiola; Erick García
- Past members: Edén Muñoz; Armando Ramos; Martín López; Augusto Guido; Ángel Saucedo; José Mario Gastélum; Óscar Arredondo; Tony Elizondo
- Website: calibre50.co

Calibre 50 (Spanish pronunciation: [kaˈliβɾe siŋˈkwenta]) is a regional Mexican band. Formed in Mazatlán, Sinaloa, in 2010. The band has had several lineup changes, with the current roster consisting of lead vocalist Beto Gastélum, accordionist and backing vocalist Juan Saucedo, sousaphonist Alejandro Gaxiola, and drummer Erick García.

The band is one of the most streamed regional Mexican acts in recent history. Their musical style employs a fusion of norteño and banda music, known as norteño-banda, with low notes played by a sousaphone instead of a bass guitar as is traditional in norteño music.

== History ==
Before forming Calibre 50, Edén Muñoz had been the accordionist and vocalist in the norteño-banda group, Colmillo Norteño. With Muñoz, the group scored the hit songs "Sueño guajiro" and "Hotel El Cid" in 2009, among others. Nevertheless, conflicts with the other members of the band led Muñoz to quit Colmillo Norteño in early 2010, and he founded his own band later that year, recruiting Armando Ramos as guitarist and backing vocalist, Martín López as sousaphonist, and Augusto Guido as drummer. The name of this new band was "Puro Colmillo Norteño", and they recorded their first album, "Renovar o Morir", under that name, as well as their first single ("El infiernito"). However, the original Colmillo Norteño sued them over the name, and after a legal dispute Muñoz' band was forced to change their name later in 2010. They chose the name by which they are known today: Calibre 50. The name of the band comes from the comparison "with an element that will symbolize the strength and impact that the project has on the lives of the members, as well as those who like the Regional Mexican genre."

Calibre 50 first achieved notoriety for their controversial songs; among them corridos. Their first nationwide hit was "El tierno se fue" ("The nice guy is gone") in 2011, a ranchera written by Lalo Ayala which contains many innuendos and describes a sexual act in detail. Throughout its history, the band has recorded different styles of songs such as rancheras, corridos, ballads, cumbias, charangas, boleros, and huapangos.

In January 2014, drummer Augusto Guido left the band to work on his own group, "Los de Sinaloa"; he was replaced by Erick García. Two months later, sousaphone player Martín López also left the band to work on another project, "La Iniciativa". He was subsequently replaced by Alejandro Gaxiola.

In March 2017, Calibre 50 made history when the band became the first Regional Mexican act to perform on the Conan show on an episode that took place in Mexico City. Calibre 50 made their Rodeo Houston debut on March 11, 2018, to a sold-out crowd.

On April 26, 2018, Calibre 50, along with Colombian Urban singer J Balvin, received an award from Pandora Radio for being the first artists to surpass a billion streams on the platform.

In October 2020, the group broke the record for the most number-one songs on the Billboard Regional Mexican Airplay chart with 17 songs. Since then, they have broken their own record with 10 additional songs reaching No. 1; totaling 27 No. 1 songs on the Billboard Regional Mexican Airplay chart.

In late January 2022, Edén Muñoz left Calibre 50 to embark on a solo career. On March 1, 2022, after several auditions, the band presented in a press conference their new lead vocalist, Tony Elizondo. On April 8, 2022, Calibre 50 presented in another press conference their new accordionist and additional backing vocalist, Ángel Saucedo.

On April 1, 2023, guitarist and backing vocalist Armando Ramos left Calibre 50 after 13 years to start his own band, "Al Tiro". The very next day, on April 2, 2023, accordionist and backing vocalist Ángel Saucedo left Calibre 50 after only one year to begin a solo career. Armando Ramos and Ángel Saucedo were replaced by Oscar Arredondo and José Mario Gastélum, respectively. Tony Elizondo also became a guitarist for the band.

Gastélum and Arredondo's tenure in Calibre 50 would last less than a year, as both quit the band in early 2024. In April of that year, it was revealed that Beto Gastélum was the new lead vocalist. Gastélum, like Edén Muñoz, had previously served as the lead vocalist for Colmillo Norteño. Also, Martín López, Calibre 50's original sousaphonist from 2010 to 2014, returned to the band as a new accordionist. For several months, both he and Gastélum were accordionists for Calibre 50 during live concerts before López left the band again in October 2024.

In March 2025, Juan Sauceda was added as Calibre 50's new accordionist, leaving Beto Gastélum to focus solely on lead vocals. On December 1, 2025, Tony Saucedo announced his departure from Calibre 50 to start a solo career, leaving the band without an official guitarist.

== Members ==
- Beto Gastélum, lead vocals
- Juan Sauceda, diatonic accordion, backing vocals
- Alejandro Gaxiola, sousaphone
- Erick García, drums

=== Past members ===
- Edén Muñoz, lead vocals and diatonic accordion
- Armando Ramos, secondary vocals and twelve-string guitar
- Martín "Trompudo" López, sousaphone, diatonic accordion and backing vocals
- Augusto Guído, drums
- Ángel Saucedo, backing vocals and diatonic accordion
- José Mario "Marito" Gastélum, lead vocals and diatonic button accordion
- Óscar Arredondo, backing vocals and twelve-string guitar
- Tony Elizondo, secondary vocals and twelve-string guitar

== Discography ==
Albums

- 2010: Renovar o Morir (Originally issued under the name "Puro Colmillo Norteño", later reissued as Calibre 50).
- 2011: De Sinaloa Para El Mundo
- 2012: El Buen Ejemplo
- 2013: La Recompensa
- 2013: Corridos de Alto Calibre
- 2014: Contigo
- 2015: Historias de La Calle
- 2016: Desde El Rancho
- 2017: En Vivo desde el Auditorio Telmex
- 2017: Guerra de Poder
- 2018: Mitad y Mitad
- 2019: Simplemente Gracias
- 2020: En Vivo
- 2020: Desde el Estudio Andaluz Music
- 2021: Vamos Bien
- 2022: Corridos de Alto Calibre, Vol. II
- 2023: Tiempo al Tiempo
- 2023: Cumbias En Vivo y Algo Más
- 2024: Las Culebras
- 2024: El Sueño Americano
- 2026: El Mundo es del Que Se Anima
- 2026: Mi Hubiera Favorito

Extended Plays

- 2014: Siempre Contigo (Spotify Sessions)
- 2021: En Vivo desde el Rancho San Vicente
- 2025: Siempre Amigos

Singles

- 2012: Mujer de Todos, Mujer de Nadie
- 2013: Aquí Estoy
- 2014: El Inmigrante
- 2014: Tus Latidos
- 2014: Una Mala Elección
- 2014: Contigo
- 2015: Aunque Ahora Estés con Él
- 2015: La Gripa
- 2015: Contigo (Versión Pop)
- 2016: Amor del Bueno
- 2016: La Bola
- 2016: Siempre Te Voy a Querer
- 2016: Pa' Qué Me Hacen Enojar
- 2017: Las Ultras
- 2017: Contigo (En Vivo Auditorio Telmex)
- 2017: Javier el de Los Llanos (En Vivo Auditorio Telmex)
- 2017: Ni Que Estuvieras Tan Buena (En Vivo Auditorio Telmex)
- 2017: Corrido de Juanito
- 2017: Frijoles con Panela
- 2017: De Buen Perfil ft. Banda Carnaval
- 2017: Se Los Lleva Por Delante
- 2018: Mitad y Mitad
- 2018: Tu Patrocinador
- 2018: Una Mala Racha
- 2018: Mi Sorpresa Fuiste Tú
- 2018: A Mover los Pies
- 2018: Qué Tiene de Malo (Alternate Version) ft. El Komander
- 2018: A las Cuántas Decepciones with Los de La Noria
- 2018: Culiacán vs. Mazatlán
- 2019: Simplemente Gracias
- 2019: Más Ganas le Meto
- 2019: Chalito
- 2019: Solo Tú
- 2019: Chalito (En Vivo) ft. El Fantasma
- 2019: El Amor No Fue Pa' Mí (En Vivo) ft. Grupo Firme
- 2020: Que Sea with Joan Sebastian
- 2020: Barquillero
- 2020: Volver a Volar
- 2020: Decepciones with Alejandro Fernández
- 2020: Te Volvería a Elegir
- 2020: Quiérete a Ti
- 2021: 100 Años with Carlos Rivera and Maluma
- 2021: El Mensaje ft. Los Dos Carnales
- 2021: Vamos Bien (En Vivo)
- 2021: Olvidarte, ¿Cómo? (En Vivo) with Banda Carnaval
- 2021: Chito (En Vivo)
- 2021: El Triste Alegre (En Vivo) with Banda Carnaval
- 2021: Hoy Empieza Mi Tristeza (En Vivo) with José Manuel Figueroa
- 2021: A La Antigüita (En Vivo)
- 2021: Te Quiero Tanto, Tanto (En Vivo)
- 2021: Ni Mandándote a Hacer (En Vivo)
- 2021: Tú Eres Mi Amor (Versión Regional Mexicana) with Río Roma
- 2021: Les Salió Travieso el Niño (En Vivo) with Los de La Noria
- 2021: Crónicas de la Batalla with Los Dos Carnales
- 2021: Cuidando el Territorio with Beto Sierra and Santa Fe Klan
- 2021: Qué Bonito with Pancho Barraza
- 2022: Miranos Ahora
- 2022: El Mexicano es Cabrón ft. Emmanuel Delgado
- 2022: El Callado
- 2022: El Canelo ft. Emmanuel Delgado
- 2022: Chalito (Versión Norteño)
- 2022: Así Que Te Vas with Valentín Elizalde
- 2023: El M Grande with Valentín Elizalde
- 2023: Dirección Equivocada
- 2023: Y Yo Sin Ti
- 2023: ¿Quién de las Dos Será?
- 2023: Hablar de Ti
- 2023: Vengo de Verla
- 2023: Nuestro Amor
- 2024: Días Buenos, Días Malos
- 2024: Nada Que Ver
- 2024: Maybe
- 2024: El Amor de Mi Vida
- 2024: El Sueño Americano
- 2025: Los Consentidos de Don Chuy ft. Banda Carnaval
- 2025: Vuela Alto ft. Banda Carnaval
- 2026: Me Enamoré Solo
- 2026: Te Amo (collaboration with Josi Cuen and Jorge Medina)
- 2026: Mi Problema
- 2026: Pata de Perro

== Awards and nominations ==
Year	Award	Category	Recipient	Result	Ref.
2012	Premios Lo Nuestro	Mejor Artista Revelación del Año/Regional Mexicano	Calibre 50	Won	
2015	Premios Juventud	Mi Letra Favorita/Música	"Contigo"	Won	
2015	Premios Juventud	Mejor Tema Novelero/Novelas	"Aunque Ahora Estés con Él"	Nominated	
2017	Premios Lo Nuestro	Grupo o Dúo del Año/Regional Mexicano	Calibre 50	Won	
2017	iHeartRadio Music Awards	Mejor Artista de Música Regional Mexicana	Calibre 50	Won	
