= Banda Carnaval =

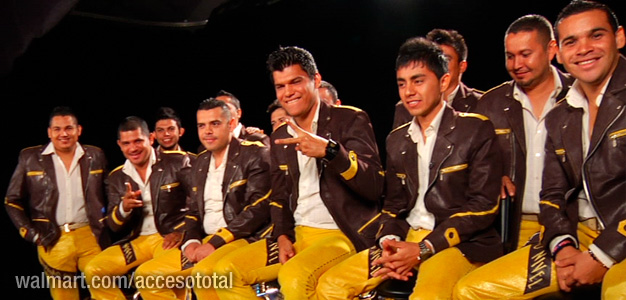

Background information
- Origin: Mazatlán, Sinaloa, Mexico
- Genres: Banda
- Years active: 2001–present
- Labels: Universal Music
- Website: bandacarnaval.co

'Banda Carnaval' is a Mexican Latin Grammy-nominated banda from Mazatlán, Sinaloa, Mexico. The group was named after "El Carnaval de Mazatlán" which is the biggest event that takes place every year in their hometown of Mazatlán. It was formed by Jesús Tirado Castañeda in 2001.

== Discography ==
- 2001: Entre Suspiro y Suspiro
- 2008: Aquí Estamos
- 2010: Corridos y Rancheras
- 2011: El Número 1
- 2012: Máximo Nivel
- 2013: Las Vueltas de La Vida
- 2013: Puros Corridos
- 2014: La Historia de Mis Manos
- 2015: Hombre de Trabajo
- 2016: Corridos y Rancheras En Vivo Desde Mazatlán, Sinaloa
- 2017: Como No Queriendo
- 2019: Porque Así Tenía Que Ser
- 2020: Desde El Estudio Andaluz

== Awards ==
=== Latin Grammy Awards ===
Year	Nominee / work	Award	Result
2013	Las Vueltas de la Vida	Best Banda Album	Nominated
