= J Balvin discography =

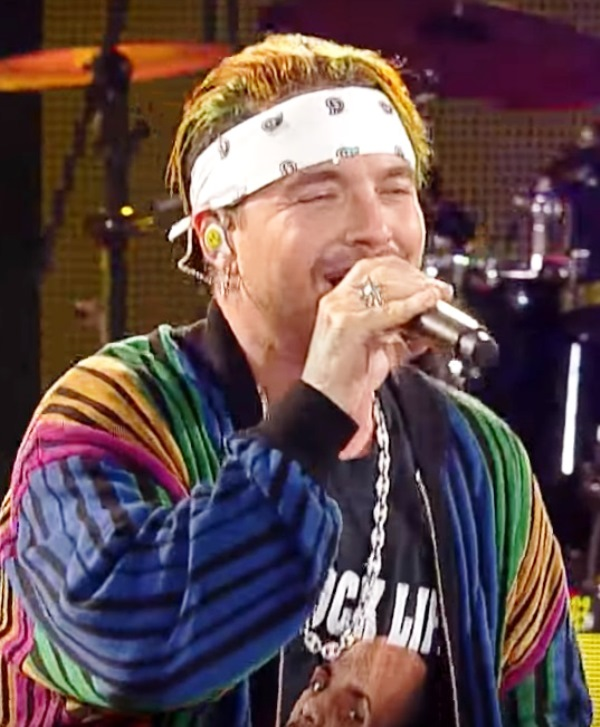
- J Balvin performing in 2017
- Studio albums: 7
- EPs: 3
- Singles: 120
- Collaborative albums: 2
- Mixtapes: 3

Colombian singer and rapper J Balvin has released six studio albums, two collaborative album, three mixtapes, three EPs, sixty-nine singles, thirty featured singles, and ten promotional singles. He is one of the best-selling Latin artists, with over 45 million singles and over 4 million album sales (specially based on US sales)

In 2009, Balvin released his single "Ella Me Cautivó", becoming his first song to chart in the United States, which serves as the first single from his debut album Real that was released in 2009 and received a Gold certification. In the beginning of 2012, he released a mixtape that includes some singles and new songs, only released in the US and Mexico.

On April 24, 2012, Balvin released "Yo Te Lo Dije", the first single from his then-upcoming album, La Familia. The song was number one in Colombia for eight non-consecutive weeks and became his first charting entry on the Top Latin Songs chart, peaking at number 13, and also became a hit in Romania. The second single, "Tranquila", was a top ten hit in four countries and peaked at the top of the charts in Greece. This resulted in the release of a remix featuring Greek-Albanian singer Eleni Foureira. In 2013, he released the third single "Sola" that was number one in Colombia and charted in Bulgaria. On October 15, 2013, he released "6 AM", which features Farruko, ane was later sent to Latin radio and received heavy rotation, becoming his first number one on the Latin Rhythm Songs chart, and peaked at number three at Billboard Latin Songs chart. The song was certified Gold in Mexico and Spain. That October 2013, Balvin released his first studio album La Familia, which peaked at number ten on the Latin Albums chart, topped the Latin Rhythm Albums chart and received seven Platinum and two Gold certifications. In 2014, he released the fifth single "La Venganza". An expanded version of La Familia, subtitled B Sides, was released on September 16, 2014, that spawned the hit single "Ay Vamos", that eventually topped the charts in Colombia, Dominican Republic and the Latin Rhythm Songs chart.

== Albums ==
=== Studio albums ===
List of studio albums, with selected details, chart positions, sales, and certifications
Title	Studio album details	Peak chart positions										Sales	Certifications
Title	Studio album details	BEL	FRA	ITA	MEX	NL	SPA	SWE	SWI	US	US Latin	Sales	Certifications
La Familia	Released: October 29, 2013; Label: Capitol Latin; Format: CD, digital download	—	—	—	46	—	—	—	—	—	10	US: 15,000 (Note: Sales of La Familia in the United States as of October 2014.)	AMPROFON: 4× Platinum; IFPI CH: 2× Platinum; RIAA: 7× Platinum (Latin)
Energia	Released: June 24, 2016; Label: Capitol Latin; Format: CD, digital download	187	—	—	1	—	44	—	49	38	1	US: 102,000 (Note: Sales of Energia in the United States as of July 2017.)	AMPROFON: Diamond+Gold; FIMI: Gold; IFPI CH: Platinum; RIAA: 4× Platinum (Latin)
Vibras	Released: May 25, 2018; Label: Universal Latino; Format: CD, digital download	119	79	47	—	28	62	50	20	15	1	US: 15,000 (Note: Sales of Vibras in the United States as of June 28, 2018.)	AMPROFON: 3× Platinum+Gold; MC: Platinum; RIAA: 17× Platinum (Latin)
Colores	Released: March 19, 2020; Label: Universal Latino; Format: CD, digital download, streaming	52	36	10	4	34	2	31	9	15	2	US: 3,000 (Note: First week sales of Colores in the United States.)	AMPROFON: Gold; PROMUSICAE: Platinum; RIAA: Diamond (Latin)
Jose	Released: September 10, 2021; Label: Universal Latino; Format: CD, digital download, streaming	112	48	10	1	31	1	—	14	12	1		AMPROFON: 2× Platinum+Gold; FIMI: Gold; PROMUSICAE: Gold; RIAA: 14× Platinum (Latin)
Rayo	Released: August 9, 2024; Label: Capitol, Universal Latino; Format: Cassette, CD, digital download, streaming	—	—	—	—	—	6	—	39	—	13		RIAA: Gold (Latin)
Mixteip	Released: July 18, 2025; Label: Sueños Globales; Format: CD, digital download, streaming	—	—	—	—	—	51	—	—	—	—		
"—" denotes the album failed to chart or not released

=== Collaborative studio albums ===
List of collaborative studio albums, with selected details, chart positions, sales, and certifications
Title	Studio album details	Peak chart positions										Sales	Certifications
Title	Studio album details	BEL	FRA	ITA	MEX	NL	SPA	SWE	SWI	US	US Latin	Sales	Certifications
Oasis (with Bad Bunny)	Released: June 28, 2019; Label: Universal Latino; Format: CD, digital download, streaming	126	95	34	— (Note: Oasis did not enter the Mexican Albums Chart, but peaked at number 7 on the Mexican Spanish Albums Chart.)	17	51	25	22	9	1	US: 5,000 (Note: First week sales of Oasis in the United States.)	AMPROFON: Platinum; PROMUSICAE: Gold; RIAA: 2× Diamond (Latin)
Omertà (with Ryan Castro)	Released: May 7, 2026; Label: Sueños Globales; Format: Cassette, CD, digital download, streaming	—	—	—	—	—	76	—	—	—	—		
"—" denotes the album failed to chart or not released

=== Reissued albums ===
List of reissued albums
Title	Album details	Peaks
Title	Album details	MEX
La Familia B Sides	Released: September 16, 2014; Label: Capitol Latin; Formats: CD, digital download	3

=== Mixtapes ===
List of mixtapes
Title	Album details
Real	Released: 2007 (US); Label: J Balvin Limited; Formats: Digital download
El negocio	Released: 2008 (US); Label: J Balvin Limited; Formats: Digital download
J Balvín Mix Tape	Released: February 28, 2012 (US); Label: EMI Colombia; Formats: Digital download

== Extended plays ==
List of extended plays
Title	Details
Summer Love	Released: July 31, 2020; Label: Universal; Format: Digital download
Summer Vacation	Released: August 8, 2020; Label: Universal; Format: Digital download
Summer Fiesta	Released: August 14, 2020; Label: Universal; Format: Digital download

== Singles ==
=== As lead artist ===
List of singles as lead artist, with selected chart positions and certifications, showing year released and album name
Title	Year	Peak chart positions										Certifications	Album
Title	Year	COL	ARG	BEL (WA)	FRA	ITA	MEX	SPA	SWI	US	US Latin	Certifications	Album
"Ella Me Cautivó"	2009	16	—	—	—	—	—	—	—	—	— (Note: "Ella Me Cautivó" did not enter the Billboard Hot Latin Songs, but peaked at number 35 on the Billboard Tropical Airplay chart.)		Real
"Sin Compromiso"	2010	2	—	—	—	—	—	—	—	—	— (Note: "Sin Compromiso" did not enter the Billboard Hot Latin Songs, but peaked at number 16 on the Billboard Tropical Airplay chart.)		J Balvin Mix Tape
"Me Gustas Tú"	2010	11	—	—	—	—	—	—	—	—	—		J Balvin Mix Tape
"En Lo Oscuro"	2011	1	—	—	—	—	—	—	—	—	—		J Balvin Mix Tape
"Como un Animal"	2012	—	—	—	—	—	—	—	—	—	—		J Balvin Mix Tape
"Yo Te Lo Dije"	2012	1	—	—	—	—	—	—	—	—	13	RIAA: 2× Platinum (Latin)	La Familia
"Tranquila"	2012	3	—	—	—	—	— (Note: "Tranquila" did not enter the Billboard Mexico Airplay chart, but peaked at number 26 on the Billboard Mexican Espanol Airplay chart.)	—	—	—	34	RIAA: Platinum (Latin)	La Familia
"Sola"	2013	1	—	—	—	—	—	—	—	—	—	RIAA: Gold (Latin)	La Familia
"6 AM" (featuring Farruko)	2013	4	—	—	—	—	24	22	—	—	3	AMPROFON: Platinum; PROMUSICAE: 2× Platinum; RIAA: Diamond (Latin)	La Familia
"La Venganza"	2014	10	—	—	—	—	—	—	—	—	—		La Familia
"Ay Vamos"	2014	1	—	—	—	—	35	18	—	— (Note: "Ay Vamos" did not enter the Billboard Hot 100, but peaked at number 11 on the Billboard Bubbling Under Hot 100 chart.)	1	AMPROFON: 7× Diamond+4× Platinum; FIMI: Gold; PROMUSICAE: Platinum; RIAA: Diamond (Latin)	La Familia B Sides
"Ginza"	2015	1	—	— (Note: "Ginza" did not enter the Ultratop 50, but peaked at number 16 on the Walloon Ultratip chart.)	21	1	1	1	33	84	1	AMPROFON: 6× Diamond+4× Platinum+Gold; FIMI: 5× Platinum; PROMUSICAE: 4× Platinum; RIAA: Diamond (Latin)	Energia
"Bobo"	2016	2	8	—	—	—	1	13	—	— (Note: "Bobo" did not enter the Billboard Hot 100, but peaked at number 4 on the Billboard Bubbling Under Hot 100 Singles chart.)	1	AMPROFON: 3× Platinum+Gold; PROMUSICAE: 2× Platinum; RIAA: Platinum (Latin)	Energia
"Safari" (featuring Pharrell Williams, BIA and Sky)	2016	5	15	—	132	26	1	1	76	— (Note: "Safari" did not enter the Billboard Hot 100, but peaked at number 7 on the Billboard Bubbling Under Hot 100 Singles chart.)	3	AMPROFON: 2× Platinum; FIMI: 2× Platinum; PROMUSICAE: 4× Platinum	Energia
"Qué Raro" (with Feid)	2016	—	—	—	—	—	—	78	—	—	47	RIAA: Gold (Latin)	Así Como Suena
"Sigo Extráñandote"	2017	3	9	—	—	—	36	13	—	—	9	AMPROFON: Diamond; FIMI: Gold; PROMUSICAE: 2× Platinum	Energia
"Si Tu Novio Te Deja Sola" (featuring Bad Bunny)	2017	14	—	—	—	—	—	—	—	—	14	PROMUSICAE: Platinum	Non-album single
"Hey Ma" (with Pitbull featuring Camila Cabello or Britney Spears and Romeo Santos)	2017	44	12	— (Note: "Hey Ma" did not enter the Ultratop 50, but peaked at number three on the Walloon Ultratip chart.)	49	35	13	6	30	— (Note: "Hey Ma" did not enter the Billboard Hot 100, but peaked at number 8 on the Billboard Bubbling Under Hot 100 Singles chart.)	5	FIMI: Platinum; PROMUSICAE: 3× Platinum; RIAA: Gold	The Fate of the Furious
"Bonita" (with Jowell & Randy or remix featuring Wisin & Yandel, Nicky Jam and Ozuna)	2017	5	18	—	—	79	20	8	—	— (Note: "Bonita" did not enter the Billboard Hot 100, but peaked at number 5 on the Billboard Bubbling Under Hot 100 Singles chart.)	8	AMPROFON: 3× Diamond+Platinum+Gold; FIMI: Platinum; PROMUSICAE: 3× Platinum; SNEP: Gold	Non-album single
"Mi Gente" (with Willy William)	2017	1	2	7	10	1	1	1	4	19	1	ASINCOL: 2× Platinum; AMPROFON: 4× Diamond+Gold; BEA: 2× Platinum; BPI: 2× Platinum; FIMI: 5× Platinum; IFPI SWI: Platinum; MC: 6× Platinum; PROMUSICAE: 4× Platinum; SNEP: Diamond	Vibras
"Mi Gente" (Remix) (with Willy William featuring Beyoncé)	2017	1^{1}	1^{1}	7^{1}	—	—	1^{1}	15	16	3^{1}	1^{1}	PROMUSICAE: Gold; RIAA: 2× Platinum; RIAA: 68× Platinum (Latin); SNEP: Gold	Non-album singles
"Sensualidad" (with Bad Bunny and Prince Royce featuring Mambo Kingz and DJ Luian)	2017	12	— (Note: "Sensualidad" did not enter the Billboard Argentina Hot 100, but peaked at number 4 on the Argentine Digital Song Sales chart.)	—	—	—	— (Note: "Sensualidad" did not enter the Billboard Mexico Airplay chart, but peaked at number 46 on the Billboard Mexican Espanol Airplay chart.)	1	—	— (Note: "Sensualidad" did not enter the Billboard Hot 100, but peaked at number 9 on the Billboard Bubbling Under Hot 100 Singles chart.)	8	FIMI: Gold; PROMUSICAE: 3× Platinum; RIAA: 28× Platinum (Latin)	Non-album singles
"Downtown" (with Anitta)	2017	9	15	—	—	—	— (Note: "Downtown" did not enter the Billboard Mexico Airplay chart, but peaked at number 14 on the Billboard Mexican Espanol Airplay chart.)	8	73	—	14	ASINCOL: 4× Platinum; CAPIF: Platinum; FIMI: Gold; PROMUSICAE: 2× Platinum; RIAA: 6× Platinum (Latin)	Non-album singles
"Bum Bum Tam Tam (Remix)" (with Future, Stefflon Don, Juan Magán and Mc Fioti)	2017	32	87	— (Note: "Bum Bum Tam Tam" did not enter the Ultratop 50, but peaked at number 2 on the Walloon Ultratip chart.)	3	42	—	9	51	—	23	AMPROFON: Diamond+2× Platinum; BEA: Gold; BPI: Silver; FIMI: Platinum; PROMUSICAE: Platinum; RIAA: 2× Diamond (Latin); SNEP: Diamond	Non-album singles
"Machika" (with Anitta and Jeon)	2018	1	17	— (Note: "Machika" did not enter the Ultratop 50, but peaked at number 32 on the Walloon Ultratip chart.)	185	14	45	14	94	— (Note: "Machika" did not enter the Billboard Hot 100, but peaked at number 16 on the Billboard Bubbling Under Hot 100 Singles chart.)	10	FIMI: Platinum; PROMUSICAE: Gold; RIAA: Platinum (Latin)	Vibras
"Ahora"	2018	45	—	—	—	—	— (Note: "Ahora" did not enter the Billboard Mexico Airplay chart, but peaked at number 43 on the Billboard Mexican Espanol Airplay chart.)	27	—	—	27	PROMUSICAE: Gold	Vibras
"X" (with Nicky Jam)	2018	2	17	19	5	1	4	1	3	41	1	AMPROFON: 2× Diamond+2× Platinum; BEA: Gold; BPI: Silver; IFPI SWI: 2× Platinum; FIMI: 3× Platinum; PROMUSICAE: 3× Platinum; MC: Platinum; SNEP: Diamond; RIAA: 35× Platinum (Latin)	Íntimo
"Ambiente"	2018	7	37	—	—	—	— (Note: "Ambiente" did not enter the Billboard Mexico Airplay chart, but peaked at number 21 on the Billboard Mexican Espanol Airplay chart.)	30	—	—	11	PROMUSICAE: Platinum	Vibras
"Familiar" (with Liam Payne)	2018	33	— (Note: "Familiar" did not enter the Billboard Argentina Hot 100, but peaked at number 3 on the Argentina Anglo Airplay chart.)	10	103	—	9	65	52	— (Note: "Familiar" did not enter the Billboard Hot 100, but peaked at number 19 on the Billboard Bubbling Under Hot 100 Singles chart.)	—	AMPROFON: Gold; MC: Platinum	LP1
"I Like It" (with Cardi B and Bad Bunny)	2018	19	41	21	25	24	— (Note: "I Like It" did not enter the Billboard Mexico Airplay chart, but peaked at number 3 on the Billboard Mexico Ingles Airplay chart.)	10	8	1	— (Note: "I Like It" did not enter the Billboard Hot Latin Songs, but peaked at No. 13 on the Billboard Latin Pop Songs chart, and at No. 7 on the Latin Airplay chart.)	BPI: Platinum; CAPIF: Gold; FIMI: 2× Platinum; IFPI SWI: 2× Platinum; MC: 5× Platinum; PROMUSICAE: 3× Platinum; RIAA: Diamond; SNEP: Diamond	Invasion of Privacy
"No Es Justo" (with Zion & Lennox)	2018	3	8	—	—	—	15	5	—	—	10	PROMUSICAE: 3× Platinum	Vibras
"Say My Name" (with David Guetta and Bebe Rexha)	2018	61	50	10	12	79	— (Note: "Say My Name" did not enter the Billboard Mexico Airplay chart, but peaked at number 6 on the Billboard Mexico Ingles Airplay chart.)	18	14	— (Note: "Say My Name" did not enter the Billboard Hot 100, but peaked at number 3 on the Billboard Bubbling Under Hot 100 Singles chart.)	—	AMPROFON: Gold; BEA: Gold; FIMI: Platinum; PROMUSICAE: 2× Platinum; SNEP: Diamond	7
"Reggaetón"	2018	1	9	—	—	—	1	26	—	—	13	PROMUSICAE: Platinum	Non-album singles
"Bola Rebola" (with Anitta and Tropkillaz featuring Mc Zaac)	2019	92	—	—	—	—	—	—	—	—	46	RIAA: Platinum (Latin)	Non-album singles
"I Can't Get Enough" (with Benny Blanco, Tainy and Selena Gomez)	2019	29	100	49	91	53	—	41	28	66	— (Note: "I Can't Get Enough" did not enter the Billboard Hot Latin Songs, but peaked at No. 15 on the Billboard Latin Pop Songs chart, and at No. 38 on the Latin Airplay chart.)	RIAA: Gold; MC: 2× Platinum; SNEP: Gold	I Said I Love You First
"Contra La Pared" (with Sean Paul)	2019	23	21	— (Note: "Contra La Pared" did not enter the Ultratop 50, but peaked at number 17 on the Walloon Ultratip chart.)	40	36	— (Note: "Contra La Pared" did not enter the Billboard Mexico Airplay chart, but peaked at number 39 on the Billboard Mexican Espanol Airplay chart.)	9	57	—	11	AMPROFON: Gold; FIMI: Platinum; PROMUSICAE: 2× Platinum; RIAA: 3× Platinum (Latin)	Non-album singles
"Con Altura" (with Rosalía featuring El Guincho)	2019	1	1	— (Note: "Con Altura" did not enter the Ultratop 50, but peaked at number 11 on the Walloon Ultratip chart.)	76	—	1	1	98	— (Note: "Con Altura" did not enter the Billboard Hot 100, but peaked at number 18 on the Billboard Bubbling Under Hot 100 Singles chart.)	12	AMPROFON: 2× Diamond+Gold; FIMI: Gold; IFPI SWI: Gold; PROMUSICAE: 5× Platinum; RIAA: 2× Platinum; SNEP: Platinum	Non-album singles
"Mañana Es Too Late" (with Jesse & Joy)	2019	11	92	—	—	—	1	—	—	—	— (Note: "Mañana Es Too Late" did not enter the Billboard Hot Latin Songs, but peaked at No. 17 on the Billboard Latin Pop Songs chart.)		Aire (Versión Día)
"Ven y Hazlo Tú" (with Nicky Jam, Anuel AA and Arcángel)	2019	—	72	—	—	—	—	56	—	—	39		Non-album single
"Loco Contigo" (with DJ Snake featuring Tyga)	2019	26	77	3	1	8	—	8	2	95	4	AMPROFON: 2× Platinum; BEA: Platinum; FIMI: 2× Platinum; PROMUSICAE: 2× Platinum; RIAA: Platinum; SNEP: Diamond	Carte Blanche
"Que Pretendes" (with Bad Bunny)	2019	1	24	—	—	72	19	5	11	65	2	PROMUSICAE: 3× Platinum; RIAA: Platinum (Latin)	Oasis
"La Canción" (with Bad Bunny)	2019	37	16	—	—	—	1	6	—	27	1	FIMI: Gold; PROMUSICAE: 5× Platinum; RIAA: Platinum (Latin); SNEP: Platinum	Oasis
"Yo Le Llego" (with Bad Bunny)	2019	—	—	—	—	—	—	45	—	—	18	PROMUSICAE: Gold; RIAA: Gold (Latin)	Oasis
"Cuidao por Ahí" (with Bad Bunny)	2019	—	60	—	—	—	—	61	—	—	26	RIAA: Gold (Latin)	Oasis
"Qué Pena" (with Maluma)	2019	1	27	—	—	—	13	21	60	—	13	AMPROFON: 3× Platinum; PROMUSICAE: Platinum	Non-album single
"Ritmo (Bad Boys for Life)" (with The Black Eyed Peas)	2019	1	2	27	10	3	11	2	6	26	1	AMPROFON: Diamond+4× Platinum; BEA: Gold; FIMI: Platinum; IFPI SWI: Platinum; PROMUSICAE: 4× Platinum; RIAA: 2× Platinum; SNEP: Diamond	Bad Boys for Life and Translation
"Blanco"	2019	1	18	—	—	—	34	7	—	—	18	AMPROFON: 2× Platinum; PROMUSICAE: 2× Platinum; RIAA: 5× Platinum (Latin)	Colores
"Morado"	2020	8	10	—	—	—	1	3	—	— (Note: "Morado" did not enter the Billboard Hot 100, but peaked at number five on the Bubbling Under Hot 100 Singles chart.)	7	AMPROFON: 2× Platinum; PROMUSICAE: 3× Platinum; RIAA: 5× Platinum (Latin)	Colores
"Medusa" (with Jhay Cortez and Anuel AA)	2020	48	57	—	—	—	—	5	—	— (Note: "Medusa" did not enter the Billboard Hot 100, but peaked at number 19 on the Bubbling Under Hot 100 Singles chart.)	12	PROMUSICAE: Platinum; RIAA: Diamond (Latin)	Non-album single
"Rojo"	2020	14	11	—	—	79	2	2	40	— (Note: "Rojo" did not enter the Billboard Hot 100, but peaked at number eight on the Bubbling Under Hot 100 Singles chart.)	10	AMPROFON: Platinum; PROMUSICAE: 3× Platinum; RIAA: 5× Platinum (Latin)	Colores
"Amarillo"	2020	7	30	— (Note: "Amarillo" did not enter the Ultratop 50, but peaked at number nine on the Walloon Ultratip chart.)	104	71	— (Note: "Amarillo" did not enter the Mexico Airplay chart, but peaked at number nine on the Mexico Top Streaming chart.)	1	44	— (Note: "Amarillo" did not enter the Billboard Hot 100, but peaked at number seven on the Bubbling Under Hot 100 Singles chart.)	8	PROMUSICAE: 2× Platinum; RIAA: 3× Platinum (Latin); SNEP: Gold	Colores
"Gris"	2020	45	—	—	—	—	—	8	—	—	38	PROMUSICAE: Platinum; RIAA: Platinum (Latin)	Colores
"Verde" (with Sky Rompiendo)	2020	35	—	—	—	—	—	19	—	—	43	RIAA: Platinum (Latin)	Colores
"Rosa"	2020	68	—	—	—	—	—	10	—	—	31	PROMUSICAE: Gold; RIAA: Platinum (Latin)	Colores
"Azul"	2020	16	31	—	—	—	— (Note: "Azul" did not enter the Billboard Mexico Airplay chart, but peaked at number 14 on the Billboard Mexican Espanol Airplay chart.)	9	76	—	22	PROMUSICAE: Platinum; RIAA: 2× Platinum (Latin); SNEP: Platinum	Colores
"Negro"	2020	77	41	—	—	—	—	13	—	—	36	PROMUSICAE: Gold; RIAA: Platinum (Latin)	Colores
"Agua" (with Tainy)	2020	8	3	—	—	89	42	1	80	— (Note: "Agua" did not enter the Billboard Hot 100, but peaked at number two on the Billboard Bubbling Under Hot 100 chart.)	5	FIMI: Gold; PROMUSICAE: 2× Platinum; RIAA: Gold	Sponge on the Run
"Anaranjado" (with Jowell & Randy)	2020	2	—	—	—	—	—	69	—	—	31		Viva el Perreo
"Un Día (One Day)" (with Dua Lipa, Bad Bunny and Tainy)	2020	5	22	18	144	23	3	6	30	63	1	AMPROFON: Diamond+4× Platinum+Gold; FIMI: Platinum; PROMUSICAE: 3× Platinum; RIAA: 15× Platinum (Latin)	Jose and Future Nostalgia: The Moonlight Edition
"Location" (with Karol G and Anuel AA)	2021	9	46	—	—	—	29	13	—	— (Note: "Location" did not enter the Billboard Hot 100, but peaked at number three on the Billboard Bubbling Under Hot 100 chart.)	6	AMPROFON: Diamond+Platinum+Gold; PROMUSICAE: Platinum; RIAA: 6× Platinum (Latin)	KG0516
"Poblado (Remix)" (with Karol G and Nicky Jam featuring Crissin, Totoy El Frio and Natan & Shander)	2021	2	13	—	—	—	—	12	—	— (Note: "Poblado (Remix)" did not enter the Billboard Hot 100, but peaked at number 20 on the Billboard Bubbling Under Hot 100 chart.)	11	AMPROFON: 3× Platinum+Gold; PROMUSICAE: Platinum	Jose
"Ma' G"	2021	56	—	—	—	—	—	—	—	—	—		Jose (Deluxe version)
"Tu Veneno"	2021	8	95	—	—	—	1	30	—	— (Note: "Tu Veneno" did not enter the Billboard Hot 100, but peaked at number one on the Billboard Bubbling Under Hot 100 chart.)	6	PROMUSICAE: Gold	Jose (Deluxe version)
"Otra Noche sin Ti" (with Khalid)	2021	7	—	—	—	—	29	25	39	— (Note: "Otra Noche sin Ti" did not enter the Billboard Hot 100, but peaked at number five on the Billboard Bubbling Under Hot 100 chart.)	5	PROMUSICAE: Gold	Jose
"Qué Más Pues?" (with María Becerra)	2021	8	1	—	—	60	27	2	54	— (Note: "Qué Más Pues?" did not enter the Billboard Hot 100, but peaked at number 23 on the Billboard Bubbling Under Hot 100 chart.)	14	AMPROFON: Diamond+4× Platinum; CAPIF: Gold; FIMI: Platinum; PROMUSICAE: 5× Platinum	Jose
"Otro Fili" (with Jay Wheeler)	2021	—	—	—	—	—	—	51	—	—	26	PROMUSICAE: Gold	Jose
"In da Getto" (with Skrillex)	2021	1	43	—	87	34	14	15	25	90	5	AMPROFON: 2× Platinum+Gold; FIMI: Platinum; PROMUSICAE: 2× Platinum; SNEP: Platinum	Jose
"Ten Cuidado"	2021	—	—	—	—	—	—	—	—	—	—		Pokémon 25: The Album
"Una Nota" (with Sech)	2021	1	90	—	—	—	—	28	—	— (Note: "Una Nota" did not enter the Billboard Hot 100, but peaked at number 19 on the Billboard Bubbling Under Hot 100 chart.)	11	AMPROFON: Gold; PROMUSICAE: Platinum	Jose
"Better Days (Remix)" (with Neiked and Mae Muller and Polo G)	2022	—	—	—	—	—	—	—	—	—	—		Non-album singles
"Niño Soñador"	2022	—	—	—	—	—	—	—	—	—	—		Non-album singles
"Sigue" (with Ed Sheeran)	2022	2	42	47	—	88	—	76	34	89	7	FIMI: Gold; PROMUSICAE: Gold	Non-album singles
"Forever My Love" (with Ed Sheeran)	2022	13	—	—	—	—	—	—	49	— (Note: "Forever My Love" did not enter the Billboard Hot 100, but peaked at number seven on the Billboard Bubbling Under Hot 100 chart.)	11		Non-album singles
"Voodoo" (with Badshah)	2022	—	—	—	—	—	—	—	—	—	—		Non-album singles
"Un Paso" (with Trueno)	2022	—	33	—	—	—	—	100	—	—	—		Non-album singles
"Bellacón" (with El Alfa)	2022	—	—	—	—	—	—	—	—	—	—		Non-album singles
"Kawaii" (with Polimá Westcoast)	2022	—	—	—	—	—	—	—	—	—	—		Non-album singles
"Toretto"	2023	—	—	—	—	—	—	—	—	—	—		Fast X
"En Alta" (with Omar Courtz, Yovngchimi, Quevedo and Mambo Kingz)	2023	—	—	—	—	—	—	63	—	—	—		Rayo
"Dientes" (with Usher and DJ Khaled)	2023	—	—	40	—	—	—	—	—	— (Note: "Dientes" did not enter the Billboard Hot 100, but peaked at number 24 on the Billboard Bubbling Under Hot 100 chart.)	—	RIAA: Gold (Latin)	Non-album singles
"Colmillo" (with Tainy and Young Miko featuring Jowell & Randy)	2023	—	—	—	—	—	—	51	—	—	—		Non-album singles
"Eyes Closed" (Remix) (with Imagine Dragons)	2024	—	—	—	—	—	—	—	—	—	—		Loom
"Polvo de tu Vida" (with Chencho Corleone)	2024	—	—	—	—	—	—	—	—	—	—		Rayo
"Gaga" (with Saiko)	2024	—	—	—	—	—	—	45	—	—	—		Rayo
"Doblexxó" (with Feid)	2024	—	—	—	—	—	—	29	—	—	—		Rayo
"Noventa" (with DJ Snake)	2025	—	—	—	—	—	—	—	—	—	—		Nomad
"—" denotes a title that was not released or did not chart in that territory.

=== As featured artist ===
List of singles as featured artist, with selected chart positions and certifications, showing year released and album name
Title	Year	Peak chart positions										Certifications	Album
Title	Year	COL	ARG	BEL	FRA	ITA	MEX	SPA	SWI	US	US Latin	Certifications	Album
"Blurred Lines" (Robin Thicke featuring Pharrell Williams and J Balvin)	2013	7	—	—	—	—	—	1	—	—	—	PROMUSICAE: Gold	Blurred Lines
"I Want Cha" (Xonia featuring J Balvin)	2014	—	—	—	—	—	—	—	—	—	—		Non-album single
"Cola Song" (Inna featuring J Balvin)	2014	—	—	— (Note: "Cola Song" did not enter the Ultratop 50, but peaked at number nine on the Walloon Ultratip chart.)	—	93	— (Note: "Cola Song" did not enter the Billboard Mexico Airplay chart, but peaked at number 40 on the Billboard Mexican Espanol Airplay chart.)	8	36	—	—	PROMUSICAE: Platinum	Body and the Sun / Party Never Ends / Inna
"Translation" (Vein featuring J Balvin and Belinda)	2014	—	—	—	—	—	— (Note: "Translation" did not enter the Billboard Mexico Airplay chart, but peaked at number 21 on the Billboard Mexican Espanol Airplay chart.)	—	—	—	—		Non-album single
"Tu Sombra" (Jencarlos Canela featuring J Balvin)	2015	—	—	—	—	—	—	—	—	—	— (Note: "Tu Sombra" did not enter the Billboard Hot Latin Songs, but peaked at number 30 on the Billboard Tropical Airplay chart.)		Jen
"Stuck on a Feeling" (Prince Royce featuring J Balvin)	2015	—	—	—	—	—	—	—	—	—	— (Note: "Stuck on a Feeling" did not enter the Billboard Hot Latin Songs, but peaked at number 28 on the Billboard Tropical Airplay chart.)		Double Vision
"La Frontera" (Juan Gabriel featuring Julión Álvarez and J Balvin)	2015	—	—	—	—	—	12	—	—	—	32		Los Dúo, Vol. 2
"Sorry" (Latino Remix) (Justin Bieber featuring and J Balvin)	2015	6	10	—	—	—	—	—	—	—	—		Non-album single
"Love Is the Name" (Sofia Carson featuring J Balvin)	2016	—	—	—	—	—	—	—	—	—	—		Non-album single
"Otra Vez" (Zion & Lennox featuring J Balvin)	2016	2	— (Note: "Otra Vez" did not enter the Billboard Argentina Hot 100, but peaked at number 17 on the Argentina Latin Airplay chart.)	—	—	89	31	7	—	— (Note: "Otra Vez" did not enter the Billboard Hot 100, but peaked at number 19 on the Billboard Bubbling Under Hot 100 Singles chart.)	5	FIMI: Platinum; PROMUSICAE: 5× Platinum	Motivan2
"35 Pa Las 12" (Fuego featuring J Balvin)	2016	—	—	—	—	—	—	—	—	—	—	RIAA: Gold (Latin)	Fireboy Forever II & Energía
"Turn out the Light" (Cris Cab featuring J Balvin)	2016	—	—	— (Note: "Turn out the Light" did not enter the Ultratop 50, but peaked at number 43 on the Walloon Ultratip chart.)	—	—	—	—	—	—	—		Non-album singles
"Ahora Dice" (Chris Jeday featuring J Balvin, Ozuna and Arcángel)	2017	9	— (Note: "Ahora Dice" did not enter the Billboard Argentina Hot 100, but peaked at number 4 on the Argentine Digital Song Sales chart.)	—	—	—	— (Note: "Ahora Dice" did not enter the Billboard Mexico Airplay chart, but peaked at number 43 on the Billboard Mexican Espanol Airplay chart.)	7	—	— (Note: "Ahora Dice" did not enter the Billboard Hot 100, but peaked at number 5 on the Billboard Bubbling Under Hot 100 Singles chart.)	7	FIMI: Gold; PROMUSICAE: 4× Platinum; RIAA: 2× Platinum (Latin)	Non-album singles
"Muy Personal" (Yandel featuring J Balvin)	2017	—	—	—	—	—	— (Note: "Muy Personal" did not enter the Billboard Mexico Airplay chart, but peaked at number 35 on the Billboard Mexican Espanol Airplay chart.)	—	—	—	—	RIAA: 2× Platinum (Latin)	Update
"Mi Cama" (Remix) (Karol G featuring J Balvin and Nicky Jam)	2018	—	10	—	—	—	38	—	—	— (Note: "Mi Cama" (Remix) did not enter the Billboard Hot 100, but peaked at number five on the Billboard Bubbling Under Hot 100 Singles chart.)	6	AMPROFON: Platinum; PROMUSICAE: 2× Platinum; RIAA: 10× Platinum (Latin)	Ocean
"Caliente" (De La Ghetto featuring J Balvin)	2018	22	—	—	—	—	— (Note: "Caliente" did not enter the Billboard Mexico Airplay chart, but peaked at number 31 on the Billboard Mexican Espanol Airplay chart.)	—	—	—	— (Note: "Caliente" did not enter the Billboard Hot Latin Songs, but peaked at No. 26 on the Billboard Latin Pop Songs chart and at No. 46 on the Latin Airplay chart.)		Mi Movimiento
"Ponle" (with Rvssian and Farruko)	2018	3	50	—	—	—	37	7	—	—	38	AMPROFON: 2× Platinum+Gold; PROMUSICAE: Platinum	Gangalee
"El Peor" (Chyno Miranda featuring J Balvin)	2018	86	22	—	—	—	—	—	—	—	—		Cariño Mío
"Just Wanna Love You" (Cris Cab featuring J Balvin)	2018	—	—	—	—	—	—	—	—	—	—		Non-album singles
"Mocca" (Remix) (Lalo Ebratt and Trapical featuring J Balvin)	2018	3	—	—	—	—	—	—	—	—	—	RIAA: Platinum (Latin)	Non-album singles
"Bajo Cero" (with Sky and Jhay Cortez featuring MadeinTYO)	2019	82	—	—	—	—	—	—	—	—	—		Non-album singles
"Baila Baila Baila" (Remix) (Ozuna featuring Daddy Yankee, J Balvin, Farruko and Anuel AA)	2019	—	19	—	—	—	— (Note: "Baila Baila Baila" (Remix) did not enter the Billboard Mexico Airplay chart, but peaked at number 32 on the Billboard Mexican Espanol Airplay chart.)	—	—	69	3	PROMUSICAE: Platinum	Non-album singles
"Tudo Bom" (Static & Ben El Tavori featuring J Balvin)	2019	—	—	—	—	—	—	—	—	—	—		Non-album singles
"You Stay" (DJ Khaled featuring Meek Mill, J Balvin, Lil Baby and Jeremih)	2019	—	—	—	—	—	—	—	—	44	—	RIAA: Platinum	Father of Asahd
"No Me Conoce" (Remix) (Jhay Cortez featuring J Balvin and Bad Bunny)	2019	8	4	—	—	—	—	—	—	71	4	AMPROFON: 2× Platinum+Gold; RIAA: 20× Platinum (Latin)	Famouz
"Haute" (Tyga featuring J Balvin and Chris Brown)	2019	—	—	—	—	—	—	—	23	— (Note: "Haute" did not enter the Billboard Hot 100, but peaked at number 1 on the Billboard Bubbling Under Hot 100 chart.)	—		Legendary
"China" (Anuel AA, Daddy Yankee and Karol G featuring J Balvin and Ozuna)	2019	1	1	— (Note: "China" did not enter the Ultratop 50, but peaked at number five on the Walloon Ultratip chart.)	47	15	1	1	10	43	1	AMPROFON: Diamond+2× Platinum+Gold; FIMI: 2× Platinum; PROMUSICAE: 7× Platinum; RIAA: Gold (Latin); SNEP: Gold	Emmanuel
"Indeciso" (Reik featuring J Balvin and Lalo Ebratt)	2019	17	42	—	—	—	2	4	—	—	31	PROMUSICAE: 3× Platinum	Non-album single
"Que Calor" (Major Lazer featuring J Balvin and El Alfa)	2019	47	70	28	13	73	32	18	53	— (Note: "Que Calor" did not enter the Billboard Hot 100, but peaked at number 23 on the Billboard Bubbling Under Hot 100 Singles chart.)	13	RIAA: Gold; IFPI SWI: Gold; FIMI: Platinum; PROMUSICAE: 2× Platinum; SNEP: Platinum	Music Is the Weapon
"Porfa" (Remix) (Feid and Justin Quiles featuring J Balvin, Maluma, Nicky Jam and Sech)	2020	6	7	—	—	—	—	—	—	—	11	AMPROFON: 4× Diamond	Bahía Ducati
"No Te Vayas" (Yandel featuring J Balvin)	2020	—	—	—	—	—	—	—	—	—	49	RIAA:Gold	Quién Contra Mí 2
"Relación" (Remix) (Sech featuring Daddy Yankee, J Balvin, Rosalía and Farruko)	2020	—	3	—	—	73	3	2	—	64	2	PROMUSICAE: 3× Platinum	Non-album singles
"Billetes Azules" (Kevvo with J Balvin)	2020	—	—	—	—	—	—	—	—	—	—		Non-album singles
"Una Locura" (Ozuna with J Balvin and Chencho Corleone)	2020	1	25	—	—	—	—	3	—	—	29	AMPROFON: Diamond; PROMUSICAE: 3× Platinum	Enoc
"La Luz" (Sech with J Balvin)	2020	—	77	—	—	—	20	7	—	—	22	PROMUSICAE: Platinum	Non-album single
"De Cora" (Rauw Alejandro with J Balvin)	2020	—	48	—	—	—	5	18	—	—	16	AMPROFON: Platinum; PROMUSICAE: Platinum	Afrodisíaco
"Baby" (Sfera Ebbasta with J Balvin)	2020	—	—	—	—	1	—	99	22	—	—	FIMI: 3× Platinum	Famoso
"Lento" (Mr Eazi with J Balvin)	2020	—	—	—	—	—	34	—	—	—	—		Non-album singles
"AM" (Remix) (Nio García with J Balvin and Bad Bunny)	2021	—	7	—	—	—	—	6	—	41	4	PROMUSICAE: 3× Platinum	Non-album singles
"Tata" (Remix) (Eladio Carrión with Daddy Yankee and J Balvin featuring Bobby Shmurda)	2021	—	—	—	—	—	—	—	—	—	50		Non-album singles
"Sal y Perrea" (Remix) (Sech with Daddy Yankee and J Balvin)	2021	—	47	—	—	—	—	—	—	—	14		Non-album singles
"—" denotes a title that was not released or did not chart in that territory.

=== Promotional singles ===
List of promotional singles, with selected chart positions and certifications, showing year released and album name
Title	Year	Peak chart positions			Certifications	Album
Title	Year	FRA	US Latin	US Latin Digital	Certifications	Album
"Seguiré Subiendo"	2011	—	—	—		El Negocio
"Mi Corazon"	2011	—	—	—		El Negocio
"DM" (Remix) (Mueka featuring Cosculluela, J Balvin and De La Ghetto)	2016	—	33	—		Non-album singles
"Ayer 2" (Anuel AA and DJ Nelson featuring J Balvin, Nicky Jam and Cosculluela)	2017	—	—	25	PROMUSICAE: Gold	Non-album singles
"Perdido" (Poo Bear featuring J Balvin)	2018	—	—	—		Poo Bear Presents Bearthday Music
"Positivo" (with Michael Brun)	2018	—	—	—		Non-album single
"Estan Pa' Mí" (with Jhay Cortez)	2018	—	—	—	RIAA: Gold (Latin)	Eyez on Me
"Dónde Estarás"	2018	193	—	12		Vibras
"La Rebelión"	2019	—	—	—		Non-album singles
"Mood (Remix)" (with 24kGoldn, Justin Bieber, and Iann Dior)	2020	—	—	—	AMPROFON: Gold	Non-album singles
"Spicy (Remix)" (Ty Dolla Sign featuring J Balvin, YG, Tyga, and Post Malone)	2021	—	—	—		Non-album singles
"7 de Mayo"	2021	—	48	—		Jose
"Que Locura"	2021	—	41	—		Jose
"Perra" (with Tokischa)	2021	—	48	—		Jose
"—" denotes a title that was not released or did not chart in that territory.

Notes

- Note 1: Uses combined chart entries for "Mi Gente" and "Mi Gente (Remix)"

== Other charted and certified songs ==
List of other charted songs, with selected chart positions, showing year released and album name
Title	Year	Peak chart positions								Certifications	Album
Title	Year	COL	ARG	BOL	FRA	ITA	SPA	US	US Latin	Certifications	Album
"Orgullo (Remix)" (Justin Quiles featuring Bad Bunny)	2014	—	—	—	—	—	—	—	—	PROMUSICAE: Gold	Non-album song
"Lean On (Remix)" (Major Lazer and DJ Snake featuring MØ, J Balvin and Farruko)	2015	—	—	—	—	—	2	—	—	PROMUSICAE: 5× Platinum	Peace Is the Mission (Remixes)
"Malvada"	2016	—	—	—	—	—	—	—	— (Note: "Malvada" did not enter the Billboard Hot Latin Songs, but peaked at No. 15 on the Latin Digital Song Sales chart.)		Energía
"Pierde Los Modales" (featuring Daddy Yankee)	2016	—	—	—	—	—	62	—	— (Note: "Pierde Los Modales" did not enter the Billboard Hot Latin Songs, but peaked at No. 42 on the Latin Digital Song Sales chart.)	PROMUSICAE: Gold	Energía
"Acércate" (featuring Yandel)	2016	—	—	—	—	—	—	—	— (Note: "Acércate" did not enter the Billboard Hot Latin Songs, but peaked at No. 25 on the Latin Digital Song Sales chart.)		Energía
"Buscando Huellas" (Major Lazer featuring J Balvin and Sean Paul)	2017	—	—	—	154	—	58	—	—		Know No Better
"Quiero Repetir" (Ozuna featuring J Balvin)	2017	—	—	—	—	—	33	—	28	PROMUSICAE: Platinum	Odisea
"Brillo" (with Rosalía)	2018	—	—	—	—	—	18	—	—	PROMUSICAE: 2× Platinum	Vibras
"En Mí"	2018	—	—	—	—	—	100	—	—		Vibras
"Peligrosa" (with Wisin & Yandel)	2018	—	—	5	—	—	50	—	34	PROMUSICAE: Platinum	Vibras
"X (Remix)" (with Nicky Jam featuring Maluma and Ozuna)	2018	—	—	—	—	—	15	—	—	PROMUSICAE: Platinum	Non-album songs
"Dime" (with Revol and Bad Bunny featuring Arcángel, De La Ghetto)	2018	—	—	—	—	—	—	—	21	RIAA: Gold (Latin)	Non-album songs
"Karma" (with Sky and Ozuna)	2018	—	—	—	—	—	—	—	30	RIAA: Platinum (Latin)	Non-album songs
"Sígueme los Pasos" (Ozuna featuring J Balvin and Natti Natasha)	2018	—	—	—	—	—	99	—	37		Aura
"Mi Gente (Homecoming Live)" (with Beyoncé)	2019	—	—	—	—	—	—	—	39		Homecoming: The Live Album
"Soy Peor (Remix)" (Bad Bunny featuring J Balvin, Ozuna and Arcángel)	2019	—	—	—	—	—	—	—	—	RIAA: Platinum (Latin)	Non-album song
"Siempre Papi, Nunca Inpapi" (with Luigi 21 Plus)	2019	20	—	—	—	—	—	—	—		Non-album song
"Mojaita" (with Bad Bunny)	2019	—	—	—	—	—	20	—	16	PROMUSICAE: Platinum; RIAA: Gold (Latin)	Oasis
"Un Peso" (with Bad Bunny featuring Marciano Cantero)	2019	—	—	—	—	—	50	—	23	PROMUSICAE: Platinum; RIAA: Gold (Latin)	Oasis
"Odio" (with Bad Bunny)	2019	—	—	—	—	—	65	—	29	RIAA: Gold (Latin)	Oasis
"Como Un Bebé" (with Bad Bunny featuring Mr Eazi)	2019	—	—	—	—	—	55	—	33	PROMUSICAE: Gold; RIAA: 5× Platinum (Latin)	Oasis
"Yoshi (Remix)" (with Machete and Dani Faiv featuring Tha Supreme, Fabri Fibra and Capo Plaza)	2019	—	—	—	—	1	—	—	—		Non-album song
"Arcoiris" (with Mr Eazi)	2020	—	—	—	—	—	23	—	47	RIAA: Platinum (Latin)	Colores
"Roses (Latino Gang Remix)" (with Saint Jhn)	2020	43	—	—	—	—	—	—	—		Non-album song
"Te Acuerdas de Mí" (with Yandel)	2021	—	—	—	—	—	—	—	33		Jose
"Billetes de 100" (with Myke Towers)	2021	—	—	—	—	—	—	—	49		Jose
"La Venganza" (with Jhay Cortez)	2021	—	—	—	—	—	—	—	46		Jose
"Restas O Sumas" (with J C Reyes)	2025	—	—	—	—	—	67	—	—		Vivir Pa' Quedarse
"—" denotes a title that was not released or did not chart in that territory.

== Guest appearances ==
List of non-single guest appearances, with other performing artists, showing year released and album name
Title	Year	Other artist(s)	Album
"Soltera"	2010	Zion & Lennox, Alberto Stylee	Los Verdaderos
"Quisiera"	2010	Pasabordo	None
"Se Aloca"	2010	Reykon	El Lider 1
"Si Tú No Estás" (Remix)	2011	Cosculluela, Ñejo & Dalmata	El Niño
"Con Flow Matalo"	2012	Reykon, Dragon & Caballero, Kevin Roldán, Maluma	El Lider 2
"The Way" (Spanglish Version)	2013	Ariana Grande	Yours Truly
"Sintiendome"	2013	Los De La Nazza	Carnal
"Travesuras" (Remix)	2014	Nicky Jam, De La Ghetto, Zion, Arcángel	Greatest Hits, Vol. 1
"Solo Tu" (Remix)	2014	Zion & Lennox, Nicky Jam	None
"Problem"	2014	Ariana Grande, Iggy Azalea	My Everything
"Maps" (Remix)	2014	Maroon 5, Rumba Whoa	V
"Orgullo"	2014	Justin Quiles	None
"Bebe Conmigo"	2014	Farruko	Los Menores
"La Hoja Se Volteo"	2014	Don Miguelo, Arcángel	None
"Mírame Ahora"	2015	Juno	The Preview
"Can't Stop Dancin'" (Remix)	2015	Becky G	None
"Tu Protagonista" (Remix)	2015	Messiah, Nicky Jam, Zion & Lenox	None
"Lean On" (Remix)	2015	Major Lazer, MØ, Farruko	None
"Mal de Amores"	2015	Juan Magán	The King Is Back
"Imaginate"	2015	Arcangel, DJ Luian	Los Favoritos
"Superhéroe"	2017	Nicky Jam	Fénix
"Colombia Heights (Te Llamo)"	2017	Wale	Shine
"Buscando Huellas"	2017	Major Lazer, Sean Paul	Know No Better
"Unforgettable" (Latin Remix)	2017	French Montana, Swae Lee	Non-album song
"Quiero Repetir"	2017	Ozuna	Odisea
"Muy Personal"	2017	Yandel	Update
"I Like It"	2018	Cardi B, Bad Bunny	Invasion of Privacy
"Perdido"	2018	Poo Bear	Poo Bear Presents Bearthday Music
"Say My Name"	2018	David Guetta, Bebe Rexha	7
"Para que te quedes"	2018	David Guetta	7
"Indeciso"	2019	Reik, Lalo Ebratt	None
"Human Lost"	2019	M-Flo	Kyo
"Time Is Money"	2025	Joyner Lucas, DaBaby, Fireboy DML	ADHD 2

== Videography ==
Year	Video	Album	Director	YouTube views
2009	"Éxtasis"	Real (Special Edition)	—	—
2009	"Ella Me Cautivó"	Real (Special Edition)	—	—
2009	"Inalcanzable"	Real (Special Edition)	—	—
2010	"Se Aloca"	Real (Special Edition)	—	—
2010	"No Me Vuelvo A Enamorar"	Real (Special Edition)	—	—
2010	"Sin Compromiso"	El Negocio (iTunes Edition)	—	—
2010	"Sin Compromiso (Official Remix)"	El Negocio (iTunes Edition)	—	—
2011	"Me Gustas Tú"	El Negocio (iTunes Edition)	—	—
2011	"Seguiré Subiendo"	El Negocio (iTunes Edition)	—	—
2011	"Como Un Animal"	El Negocio (iTunes Edition)	—	—
2011	"Mi Dama De Colombia" (with Jowell & Randy, Pibe Calderón and Pipe Bueno)	El Momento	—	—
2012	"En Lo Oscuro"	Mixtape 2012	—	—
2012	"Yo Te Lo Dije"	La Familia	—	—
2012	"Tranquila" (Lyric Video)	La Familia	—	—
2012	"Tranquila"	La Familia	—	—
2013	"Yo Te Lo Dije (Live Premios Juventud 2013)"	La Familia	—	—
2013	"Sola" (Pseudo Video)	La Familia	—	—
2013	"Sola"	La Familia	—	—
2013	"6 AM" (Pseudo Video) (featuring Farruko)	La Familia	—	—
2013	"6 AM" (featuring Farruko)	La Familia	—	—
2014	"Cola Song" (with Inna)	INNA	—	—
2014	"I Want Cha" (with Xonia)	—N/a	—	—
2014	"La Venganza" (Pseudo Video)	La Familia	—	—
2014	"Maps (Rumba Whoa Remix)" (with Maroon 5 featuring J Balvin)	V	—	—
2014	"Mars (Official Latin Remix)" (with Jay Sean and Rick Ross)	Neon	—	—
2014	"Ay Vamos"	La Familia (B Sides)	—	—
2023	"Torreto"	Fast X	Andrew Donoho	—
2024	"Eyes Closed (with Imagine Dragons)"	Loom	Matt Eastin	—
