= Sky Rompiendo =

- Born: Alejandro Ramírez Suárez; May 23, 1992 (age 34)
- Origin: Bogotá, Colombia
- Genres: Reggaeton
- Occupations: Producer, songwriter, Disc-jockey
- Years active: 2011-present

Alejandro Ramírez Suárez (born May 23, 1992), better known as Sky Rompiendo, is a Colombian producer, songwriter and DJ. He gained recognition at a young age, creating hits with Latin trap and reggaetón artists such as Bad Bunny, Feid, J Balvin, Karol G, Maluma, Nicky Jam and Ozuna. He has received six Latin Grammy Awards as a producer and songwriter.

== Career ==
Ramírez was born on May 23, 1992, in Bogotá, Colombia, and raised in Medellín, Colombia. His interest for music production began at the age of 11, when he saw the digital audio workstation called Fruity Loops being used by one of his friends. In 2011, after studying at Berklee College of Music, Boston, he began to work as a record producer for Colombian artists, producing songs like "Amor de Verano" (“summer love”) by Shako, "Cripy Cripy" (a reference to cannabis) by Yandar & Yostin and "En lo Oscuro" (“in the dark”) by J Balvin. During the production of the latter song, Ramírez developed his artistic name; initially, his nickname was ‘Sky’ after being a part of a record-producing duo named ‘Sky High’, but after hearing the sentence "rompiendo el bajo" in the song with J Balvin, he added it to his nickname—transforming it into "Sky Rompiendo el Bajo" or "Sky Rompiendo".

During 2012 and 2013, at the age of 20-21, he continued to frequently work with J Balvin, such as on the songs "Yo Te Lo Dije" (“I told you”), "Sola" (“alone”) and "6 AM"; these songs would later be a part of Balvin's first studio album, La Familia, released on October 29, 2013. The record peaked at number one in Colombia and at number 10 on the American Billboard Top Latin Albums chart. The album also received a nomination for the Latin Grammy Award for Best Urban Music Album. Sky also worked in the songs "Báilame" (“dance with me”) by Feid and on "Hagan Fila" (“stand in line”) from Yaga & Mackie's sixth album Los Mackieavelikos HD.

Sky achieved commercial and international success with J Balvin as one of the featured songwriters and producers of the song "Ginza" (2015); the song spent twenty-one weeks at number one on the Billboard Hot Latin Songs chart, breaking the record for most weeks spent in that position by a song from a solo act. Since then, Sky has produced all studio albums by J Balvin to date: Energía (2016), Vibras (2018) and Colores (2020), plus also participating in Oasis (2019), the collaborative album by Balvin with Puerto Rican singer Bad Bunny, all the aforementioned albums have peaked at number one in the Billboard Top Latin Albums, with the exception of Colores that peaked at number two.

For his work as a producer, Sky has received several nominations at the Latin Grammy Awards, including four nominations for Album of the Year and two for Record of the Year, he has also won the Latin Grammy for Best Urban Music Album three times and Best Urban Song twice. Sky has also received three nominations for Producer of the Year at the Billboard Latin Music Awards.

== Discography ==
Year	Title	Artist	Production	Songwriting
2012	Magia (A)	Maluma	check	check
2013	La Familia (A)	J Balvin	check	
2014	"Ay Vamos" (S)	J Balvin	check	check
2015	"Ginza" (S)	J Balvin	check	check
2016	"Safari" (S)	J Balvin featuring Pharrell Williams, Bia and Sky		check
2016	Energía (A)	J Balvin	check	check
2017	"Mi Gente (remix)" (S)	J Balvin and Willy William featuring Beyoncé		check
2017	"El Ratico" (S)	Juanes featuring Kali Uchis	check	
2017	Mis Planes son Amarte (A)	Juanes	check	
2017	“Bonita” (S)	Jowell & Randy, J Balvin	check	
2017	ODISEA (A)	Ozuna	check	
2017	"Downtown" (S)	Anitta con J Balvin	check	
2017	#UPDATE (A)	Yandel	check	check
2018	"Machika" (S)	J Balvin featuring Jeon and Anitta	check	check
2018	"Say My Name" (S)	David Guetta, Bebe Rexha and J Balvin		check
2018	"Por Perro" (S)	Sebastián Yatra featuring Luis Figueroa and Lary Over	check	
2018	Vibras (A)	J Balvin	check	
2018	Mi Movimiento (A)	De La Ghetto	check	check
2018	"Replay" (S)	Maikel Delacalle	check	check
2019	"Con Altura" (S)	Rosalía featuring J Balvin and El Guincho		check
2019	"Brújulas"	Reik	check	check
2019	"Blanco" (S)	J Balvin	check	check
2019	"Rojo" (S)	J Balvin	check	check
2019	"Morado" (S)	J Balvin	check	check
2019	Súper Sangre Joven (A)	Duki	check	
2019	"FRESH KERIAS" (S)	Feid, Maluma and Sky	check	check
2019	Oasis (A)	J Balvin & Bad Bunny	check	
2019	"5 Stars" (S)	C. Tangana featuring Polimá Westcoast, Duki and Neo Pistea	check	check
2020	"Que Calor" (S)	Major Lazer featuring El Alfa and J Balvin		check
2020	Colores (A)	J Balvin	check	check
2020	"Ponte Pa' Mí" (S)	Rauw Alejandro, Myke Towers, and Sky Rompiendo	check	check
2020	"TKN" (S)	Rosalía and Travis Scott	check	check
2020	Afrodisíaco (A)	Rauw Alejandro	check	
2020	"Polvo" (S)	Nicky Jam and Myke Towers	check	check
2020	FERXXO (VOL. 1: M.O.R) (A)	Feid	check	
2021	"LA FAMA" (S)	Rosalía & The Weeknd	check	check
2021	“Poblado” Remix (S)	Crissin, Karol G, J Balvin, Natan y Shander, Nicky Jam, Totoy El Frío	check	
2021	“Volando” Remix (S)	Bad Bunny, Mora, Sech	check	check
2021	“FRIKI” (S)	Feid, Karol G	check	check
2022	"Chicken Teriyaki" (S)	Rosalía	check	check

(A) Album, (S), Single

== Awards and nominations ==
=== Latin Grammy Awards ===
Year	Category	Nominated work	Artist	Result	Ref.
2015	Best Urban Song	"Ay Vamos" (as songwriter)	J Balvin	Won	
2016	Best Urban Song	"Acércate" (as songwriter)	De La Ghetto	Nominated	
2016	Best Urban Music Album	Energía (as producer)	J Balvin	Won	
2017	Album of the Year	Mis Planes son Amarte (as producer)	Juanes	Nominated	
2017	Best Pop/Rock Album	Mis Planes son Amarte (as producer)	Juanes	Won	
2017	Record of the Year	"El Ratico" (as producer)	Juanes featuring Kali Uchis	Nominated	
2018	Album of the Year	Vibras (as producer)	J Balvin	Nominated	
2018	Best Urban Music Album	Vibras (as producer)	J Balvin	Won	
2018	Best Urban Song	"Downtown" (as songwriter)	Anitta and J Balvin	Nominated	
2019	Best Urban Song	"Con Altura" (as songwriter)	Rosalía featuring J Balvin and El Guincho	Won	
2019	Best Urban Song	"Caliente" (as songwriter)	De La Ghetto featuring J Balvin	Nominated	
2020	Album of the Year	Colores (as producer)	J Balvin	Nominated	
2020	Album of the Year	Oasis (as producer)	J Balvin & Bad Bunny	Nominated	
2020	Best Urban Music Album	Colores (as producer)	J Balvin	Won	
2020	Record of the Year	"Rojo" (as producer, songwriter)	J Balvin	Nominated	
2020	Best Urban Song	"Rojo" (as producer, songwriter)	J Balvin	Nominated	
2021	Best Urban Song	"Agua" (as songwriter)	J Balvin	Nominated	
2021	Song of the Year	"Agua" (as songwriter)	J Balvin	Nominated	
2022	Record of the Year	"La Fama" (as producer)	Rosalía & The Weeknd	Nominated	
2022	Album of the Year	Motomami (as producer)	Rosalía	Won	

=== Billboard Latin Music Awards ===
Año	Categoría	Trabajo	Resultado	Ref.
2015	Producer of the Year	Sky Rompiendo	Nominated	
2017	Producer of the Year	Sky Rompiendo	Nominated	
2021	Producer of the Year	Sky Rompiendo	Nominated	
