= Billboard Latin Music Award for Latin Rhythm Airplay Song of the Year =

American music award

- Current: 2024 Billboard Latin Music Awards
- Country: United States
- Presented by: Billboard
- First award: 2009
- Final award: 2024
- Currently held by: "Bonita" by Daddy Yankee

Highlights
- Most awards: Don Omar, J Balvin, Nicky Jam, and Daddy Yankee (3)
- Most nominations: Bad Bunny & Daddy Yankee (9)
- Website: billboardevents.com

The Billboard Latin Music Award for Latin Rhythm Airplay Song of the Year is an honor that is presented annually at the Billboard Latin Music Awards, a ceremony which honors "the most popular albums, songs, and performers in Latin music, as determined by the actual sales, radio airplay, streaming and social data that informs Billboard's weekly charts."

The accolade for Latin Rhythm Airplay Song of the Year was first presented at the fifteenth Billboard Latin Music Awards in 2009 to Panamanian singer Flex's "Te Quiero". The song along with the parent album gained Flex thirteen nominations at the ceremony, where the song also received a nomination for Hot Latin Song of the Year, Hot Latin Song of the Year in the male category, Hot Latin Song of the Year in the new artist category, Latin Pop Song of the Year in the male category, Tropical Song of the Year in the male category and Latin RingMasters of the Year. It topped the Billboard Latin Rhythm Airplay chart for nine weeks in 2008. Puerto Rican singer Don Omar's "Danza Kuduro" was awarded twice, first in 2011 and again in 2012. Bad Bunny is the artist with the most nominations with nine, respectively. American entertainer Pitbull is the most nominated artist without a win, with four. Puerto Rico is the most awarded nationality, with seven wins. Winners have also been from Panama, Portugal, the Dominican Republic, Colombia and Spain.

== Recipients ==
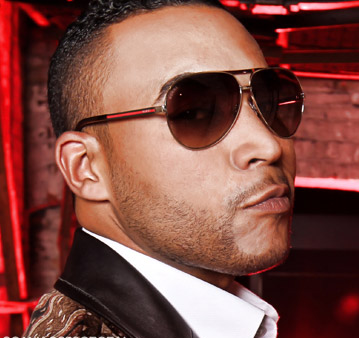
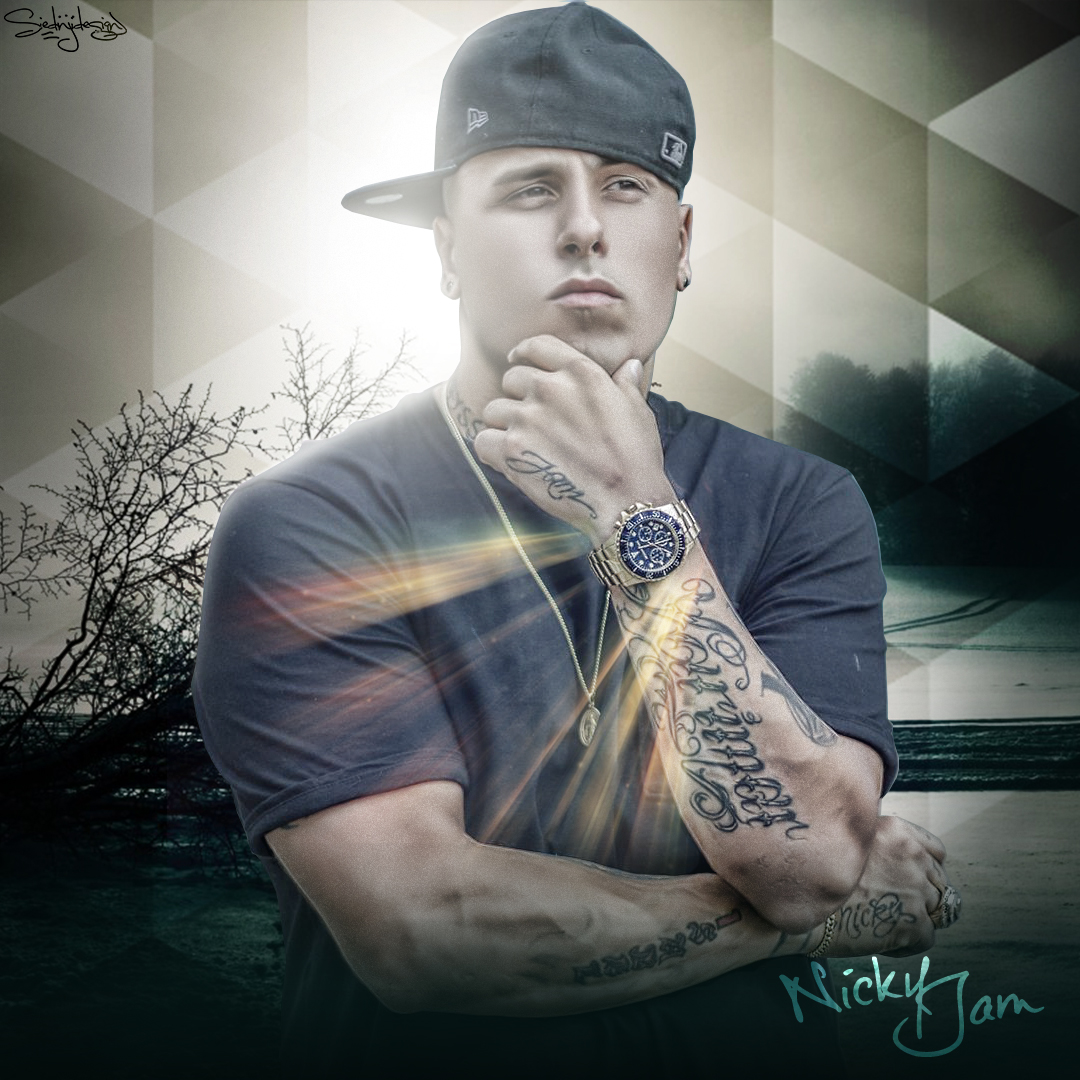

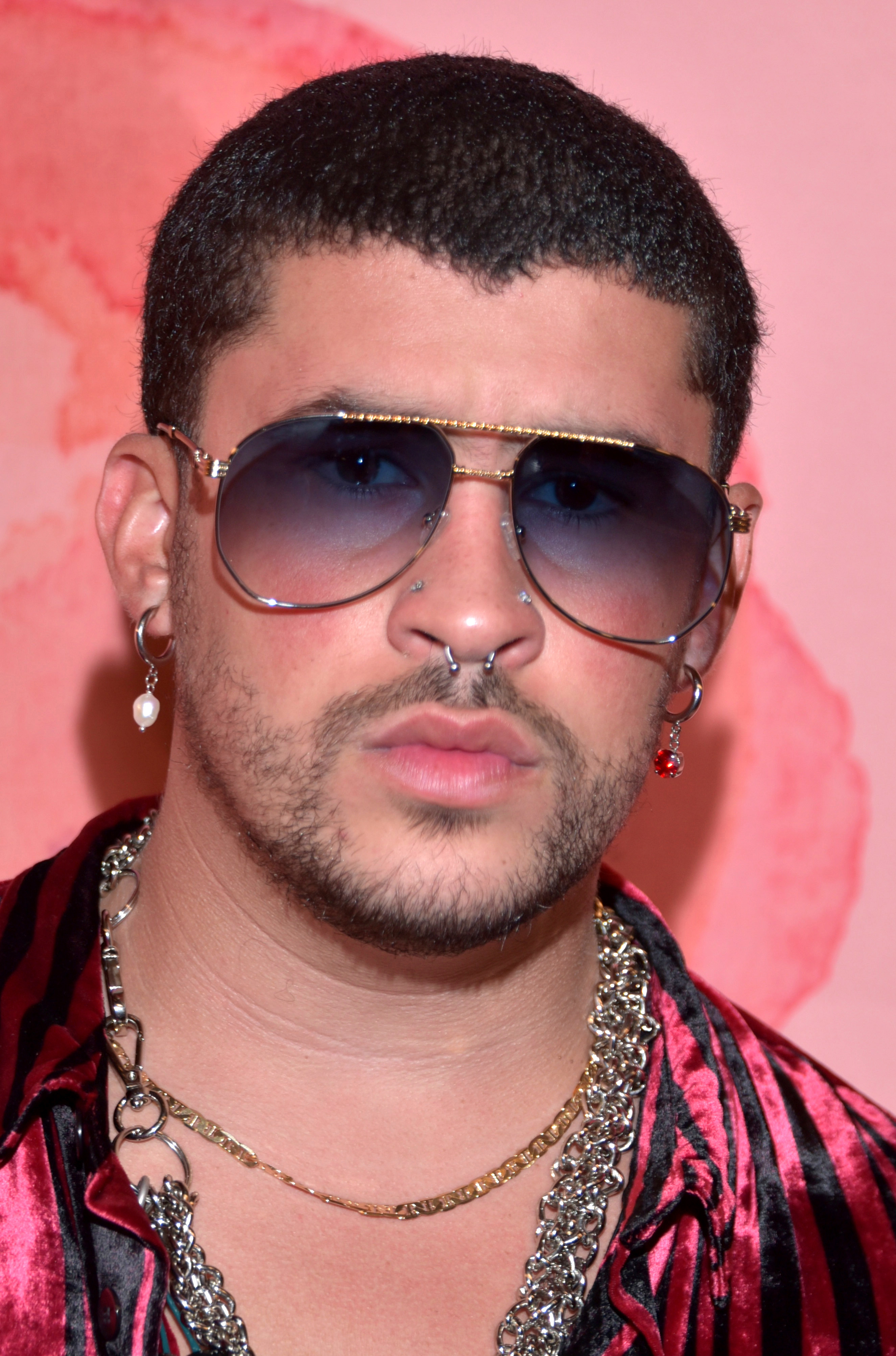
Three-time winners Don Omar (top), Nicky Jam and J Balvin (middle), and Daddy Yankee (below)

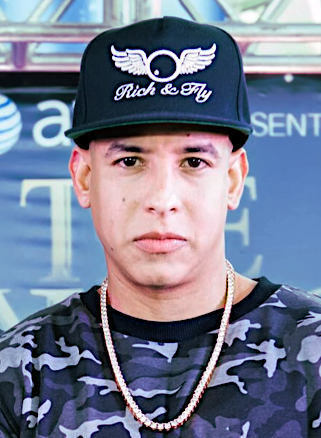
Current holder Daddy Yankee

Year	Performing artist(s)	Work	Nominees	Ref.
2009	Flex	"Te Quiero"	Daddy Yankee – "Pose"; Ivy Queen – "Dime"; Tony Dize featuring Yandel – "Permítame"	
2010	Tito El Bambino	"El Amor"	Daddy Yankee – "¿Qué Tengo Que Hacer?"; Pitbull – "I Know You Want Me (Calle Ocho)"; Wisin & Yandel – "Abusadora"	
2011	Don Omar featuring Lucenzo	"Danza Kuduro"	Daddy Yankee – "La Despedida"; Pitbull – "Bon, Bon"; Tito El Bambino – "Te Pido Perdón"	
2012	Don Omar featuring Lucenzo	"Danza Kuduro"	Don Omar – "Taboo"; Pitbull – "Bon, Bon"; Wisin & Yandel – "Estoy Enamorado"	
2013	Don Omar featuring Natti Natasha	"Dutty Love"	Daddy Yankee – "Lovumba"; Don Omar – "Hasta Que Salga El Sol"; Juan Magán featuring Pitbull and El Cata – "Bailando Por El Mundo"	
2014	Daddy Yankee	"Limbo"	Alexis & Fido – "Rompe La Cintura"; Don Omar – "Zumba"; J Álvarez – "La Pregunta"	
2015	J Balvin featuring Farruko	"6 AM"	J Balvin – "Ay Vamos"; Nicky Jam – "Travesuras"; Wisin featuring Jennifer Lopez and Ricky Martin – "Adrenalina"	
2016	Nicky Jam and Enrique Iglesias	"El Perdón"	J Balvin – "Ginza"; Maluma – "Borró Cassette"; Zion & Lennox – "Pierdo La Cabeza"	
2017	Nicky Jam	"Hasta El Amanecer"	Farruko featuring Ky-Mani Marley – "Chillax"; J Balvin – "Bobo"; Maluma featuring Yandel – "El Perdedor"	
2018	J Balvin and Willy William featuring Beyoncé	"Mi Gente"	Maluma – "Felices Los 4"; Nicky Jam – "El Amante"; Wisin featuring Ozuna – "Escápate Conmigo	
2019	Nicky Jam and J Balvin	"X"	Casper Mágico, Nio García, Darell, Nicky Jam, Ozuna, and Bad Bunny – "Te Boté"; Daddy Yankee – "Dura"; Reik featuring Ozuna and Wisin – "Me Niego"	
2020	Daddy Yankee featuring Snow	"Con Calma"	Bad Bunny & Tainy — "Callaíta"; Ozuna, Daddy Yankee & J Balvin featuring Farruko & Anuel AA — "Baila Baila Baila (Remix)"; Sech, Ozuna & Anuel AA featuring Darell & Nicky Jam — "Otro Trago (Remix)"	
2021	Maluma and The Weeknd	"Hawái (Remix)"	Bad Bunny & Jhayco — "Dakiti"; Bad Bunny — "Yo Perreo Sola"; Black Eyed Peas & J Balvin — "Ritmo (Bad Boys for Life)"; Karol G & Nicki Minaj — "Tusa"	
2022	Farruko	"Pepas"	Bad Bunny & Chencho Corleone — "Me Porto Bonito"; Aventura & Bad Bunny — "Volví"; Bad Bunny — "Yonaguni"; Becky G & Karol G — "Mamiii"	
2023	Bad Bunny	"Tití Me Preguntó"	Bad Bunny & Rauw Alejandro — "Party"; Bizarrap & Quevedo — "Quevedo: Bzrp Music Sessions, Vol. 52"; Yandel & Feid — "Yandel 150"; Yng Lvcas & Peso Pluma — "La Bebe (Remix)"	
2024	Daddy Yankee	"Bonita"	Aaantonio — "El Hotel"; Natti Natasha — "Ya No Te Extraño"; Venesti — "Umaye"; Wisin & Mora — "Bien Loco"	

== Records ==
=== Most nominations ===
Nominations	Act
9	Bad Bunny
9	Daddy Yankee
8	J Balvin
7	Nicky Jam
6	Don Omar
5	Ozuna
4	Wisin (solo)
4	Pitbull
4	Farruko
4	Maluma
3	Yandel (solo)
2	Tito "El Bambino"
2	Wisin & Yandel
2	Lucenzo
2	Darell
2	Anuel AA
2	Karol G
2	Natti Natasha

=== Multiple awards ===
Awards	Act
3	Don Omar
3	Daddy Yankee
3	J Balvin
3	Nicky Jam
2	Lucenzo
2	Farruko

== See also ==
- Latin Grammy Award for Best Urban Song
- Lo Nuestro Award for Urban Song of the Year
