= List of number-one songs of 2012 (Colombia) =

This is a list of the National-Report Top 100 Nacional number-one songs of 2012. Chart rankings are based on radio play and are issued weekly. The data is compiled monitoring radio stations through an automated system in real-time.

== Number ones by week ==
Key
†	Song of the year

Week	Issue date	Song	Artist(s)	Reference(s)
5	January 30	"Ai Se Eu Te Pego"	Michel Teló	
6	February 6	"Ai Se Eu Te Pego"	Michel Teló	
7	February 13	"Escapate Conmigo"†	Wolfine featuring Ñejo	
8	February 20	"Escapate Conmigo"†	Wolfine featuring Ñejo	
9	February 27	"Escapate Conmigo"†	Wolfine featuring Ñejo	
10	March 5	"Escapate Conmigo"†	Wolfine featuring Ñejo	
11	March 12	"Escapate Conmigo"†	Wolfine featuring Ñejo	
12	March 19	"Escapate Conmigo"†	Wolfine featuring Ñejo	
13	March 26	"Escapate Conmigo"†	Wolfine featuring Ñejo	
21	May 21	"Yo Te Lo Dije"	J Balvin	
22	May 28	"Yo Te Lo Dije"	J Balvin	
23	June 4	"Yo Te Lo Dije"	J Balvin	
24	June 11	"Yo Te Lo Dije"	J Balvin	
26	June 26	"Yo Te Lo Dije"	J Balvin	
27	July 2	"Yo Te Lo Dije"	J Balvin	
29	July 15	"Yo Te Lo Dije"	J Balvin	
30	July 23	"Te Pintaron Pajaritos"	Yandar & Yostin featuring Andy Rivera	
31	July 30	"Te Pintaron Pajaritos"	Yandar & Yostin featuring Andy Rivera	
32	August 6	"Yo Te Lo Dije"	J Balvin	
33	August 13	"Te Pintaron Pajaritos"	Yandar & Yostin featuring Andy Rivera	
38	September 17	"Te Pintaron Pajaritos"	Yandar & Yostin featuring Andy Rivera	
39	September 24	"Solitaria"	Alkilados featuring Dalmata	
40	October 1	"Volví a Nacer"	Carlos Vives	
41	October 8	"Volví a Nacer"	Carlos Vives	
42	October 15	"Volví a Nacer"	Carlos Vives	
43	October 22	"Volví a Nacer"	Carlos Vives	
44	October 29	"Volví a Nacer"	Carlos Vives	
45	November 5	"Volví a Nacer"	Carlos Vives	
46	November 12	"Volví a Nacer"	Carlos Vives	
47	November 19	"Volví a Nacer"	Carlos Vives	
48	November 26	"Volví a Nacer"	Carlos Vives	
49	December 3	"Volví a Nacer"	Carlos Vives	
50	December 10	"Volví a Nacer"	Carlos Vives	
51	December 17	"Volví a Nacer"	Carlos Vives	
52	December 25	"Volví a Nacer"	Carlos Vives	
