= Real (J Balvin album) =

Album by Colombian singer

Mixtape by J Balvin
- Released: 2007
- Genre: Reggaeton
- Label: Palma Productions

J Balvin chronology
Real (2007)	El negocio (2008)

Singles from Real
- 1. "Éxtasís" Released: April 24, 2007

Real is the first mixtape by Colombian reggaeton singer J Balvin, released in 2007. It includes collaborations with Jowell, Final & Shako, Jutha, Sara Tunes, Andy Aguilera, Karma, El Tigre, Under Pressure, Bufalo and K-Litos.

It features the songs "Éxtasis", "Sencillo", and "Una obra de arte" with Final & Shako.

== List of songs ==
- Standard edition (2007)

No.	Title	Length
1.	"Tu cuerpo"
2.	"Éxtasis"
3.	"Dime quién te enseño"
4.	"Abusadora"
5.	"Una obra de arte" (con Final & Shako)
6.	"No estas tú" (con Jutha y Under Pressure)
7.	"Ellos dicen" (con Bufalos y K-Litos)
8.	"Noche de pasión" (con Andy Aguilera)
9.	"Dimelo"
10.	"No es fácil"
11.	"Un día sin ti"
12.	"La vi"
13.	"Dame dembow"
14.	"Fantasía"
15.	"Éxtasis (Remix)" (con Jowell)
16.	"Sencillo"
17.	"Tú y yo" (con Final y K-Litos)
18.	"Show me luv"
19.	"La playa"
20.	"The mess" (con Karma y El Tigre)
21.	"Si tú no estas" (con Sara Tunes)

Real: Special Edition

Mixtape by J Balvin
- Released: May 7, 2009
- Genre: Reggaeton
- Label: EMI Music

J Balvin chronology
El negocio (2008)	Real: Special Edition (2009)	El negocio: iTunes Versión (2011)

Singles from Real: Special Edition
- 1. "Ella me cautivo" Released: May 18, 2009; 2. "No me vuelvo a enamorar" Released: August 30, 2009

== Special Edition ==
Real: Special Edition is the name of the re-release of the first mixtape by Colombian reggaeton singer J Balvin, released on May 7, 2009, by EMI Music. She counted on the collaborations of artists such as Golpe A Golpe, Héctor El Father, J Álvarez, Reykon and with songs like «Ella me cautivo», «No me vuelvo a enamorar» and «Hola que tal».

=== Background and release ===
This special edition, published on May 7, 2009, won gold in Colombia for the high sales, thus making J Balvin the first Colombian artist of the urban genre to obtain this recognition. Thanks to themes such as «Hola que tal» and «Ella me cautivó» (which appeared in the special edition) Balvin was the revelation artist of the 2009 radio station La Mega. In addition, young revelation composer of Antioquia 2009, according to the Departmental Assembly of Antioquia; artist of the year Tropicana, in Barranquilla; best summer artist 40 of Los 40 Principales and best artist of the year Oxígeno Bogotá. «Ella me cautivó» in the United States, entered the Tropical Songs list of Billboard in position 35, thus became his first entry in an international list.

- Special edition (2009)

No.	Title	Length
1.	"Ella me cautivo"	4:10
2.	"Noche de pasión" (con Andy Aguilera)	2:29
3.	"Éxtasis"	3:31
4.	"Hola que tal"	3:41
5.	"Inalcanzable" (con Golpe A Golpe)	4:04
6.	"Se aloca" (con Reykon)	3:49
7.	"No me vuelvo a enamorar" (con Jutha & Small)	3:14
8.	"Sobrenatural"	3:13
9.	"Fantasia"	3:46
10.	"Pa' la tumba (Remix)" (con Hector El Father)	4:03
11.	"Invisible"	3:51
12.	"Dime tu"	3:46
13.	"Shorty make it clap (Remix)" (con J Alvarez)	3:15
14.	"Tranquilo"	4:25
15.	"Éxtasis (Remix)" (con Jowell)	3:30
16.	"Un día sin ti"	3:15
17.	"Dame mas" (con DJ Buxxi & Jack Style)	4:03
18.	"Algo mágico" (con Jutha & Small)	3:44
19.	"Dime quien te enseño"	3:08
Total length:		69:07

- Special edition with a DVD (2009)

No.	Title	Length
1.	"Éxtasis"	3:39
2.	"Éxtasis (Remix)" (con Jowell)	3:39
3.	"Ella me cautivó"	4:16
4.	"Dime tú"	3:52
5.	"Shorty make it clap (Remix)" (con J Alvarez)	3:23
6.	"Fantasía"	3:55
7.	"Inalcanzable" (con Golpe A Golpe)	4:16
8.	"Obra de arte" (con Final & Shako)	4:32
9.	"Sobrenatural"	3:17
10.	"Abusadora"	3:17
11.	"Dime quién te enseño"	3:17
12.	"Invisible"	4:00
13.	"Un día sin ti"	3:23
14.	"Algo mágico" (con Jutha & Small)	3:48
15.	"Tranquilo"	4:31
16.	"Perdóname"	3:43
17.	"Sencillo"	4:03
18.	"En la playa"	3:49
19.	"Pa' la tumba (Remix)" (con Hector El Father)	4:09
20.	"Si no estás tú" (con Karma, Reazon y Jutha)	4:13

== Certifications ==
Country	Certifying Body	Certificación	Ventas certificadas	Ref
Colombia	RIAA	Oro (Latin)	50 000	
