= La Familia (album) =

Studio album by J Balvin
- Released: October 29, 2013
- Genre: Reggaeton
- Label: Capitol Latin

J Balvin chronology
Mix Tape (2012)	La Familia (2013)	Energia (2016)

Singles from La Familia
- 1. "Yo Te Lo Dije" Released: March 15, 2012; 2. "Tranquila" Released: October 15, 2012; 3. "Sola" Released: June 12, 2013; 4. "6 AM" Released: October 15, 2013; 5. "La Venganza" Released: April 7, 2014

La Familia B Sides

La Familia (The Family) is the debut studio album by Colombian singer J Balvin. It was released on October 29, 2013, by Capitol Latin. The album was nominated for Best Urban Music Album and the single "6 AM" for Best Urban Performance and Best Urban Song at the 15th Latin Grammy Awards. The album was reissued on September 14, 2014, as La Familia B Sides, containing three newly recorded songs and three remixes.

== Track listing ==
All tracks are written by Jose Alvaro Osorio "J" Balvin, except where noted.

La Familia
No.	Title	Writer(s)	Length
1.	"Sola"		3:48
2.	"La Venganza"		3:26
3.	"Déjate Llevar"		3:11
4.	"Mil Fantasías"	Balvin; Arbise González	3:41
5.	"6 AM" (featuring Farruko)		4:03
6.	"Lose Control" (featuring Vein)	Balvin; Gavriel Aminov; Keith Ross	4:54
7.	"Eras Así"		3:48
8.	"What a Creation"		2:29
9.	"Desnúdate"		3:45
10.	"Imaginándote"		3:36
11.	"Bajo La Luna"		4:17
12.	"Live In Stereo" (featuring Motiff)		3:30
13.	"Porque Tu"		2:56
14.	"Tranquila"		3:21
15.	"Yo Te Lo Dije"		3:40

=== La Familia B Sides ===
La Familia B Sides
No.	Title	Writer(s)	Length
1.	"Ay Vamos"	Balvin; René Cano; Alejandro Patiño; Alejandro Ramírez	3:46
2.	"Sola"		3:48
3.	"La Venganza"		3:26
4.	"Déjate Llevar"		3:11
5.	"Mil Fantasías"	Balvin; Arbise González	3:41
6.	"6 AM" (featuring Farruko)		4:03
7.	"Lose Control" (featuring Vein)	Balvin; Gavriel Aminov; Keith Ross	4:54
8.	"Eras Así"		3:48
9.	"What a Creation"		2:29
10.	"Desnúdate"		3:45
11.	"Imaginándote"		3:36
12.	"Bajo La Luna"		4:17
13.	"Live In Stereo" (featuring Motiff)		3:30
14.	"Porque Tu"		2:56
15.	"Tranquila"		3:21
16.	"Yo Te Lo Dije"		3:40
17.	"Mami"		3:07
18.	"Tú Tienes Algo"		3:09

== Charts ==
=== Weekly charts ===
Chart (2013–2014)	Peak position
Colombian Albums (ASINCOL)	1
Mexican Albums (Top 100 Mexico)	46
US Top Latin Albums (Billboard)	10
US Latin Rhythm Albums (Billboard)	1
US Top Rap Albums (Billboard)	25
US Heatseekers Albums (Billboard)	36

=== Year-end charts ===
Chart (2014)	Position
US Top Latin Albums (Billboard)	38
Chart (2015)	Position
US Top Latin Albums (Billboard)	38
Chart (2018)	Position
US Top Latin Albums (Billboard)	29
Chart (2019)	Position
US Top Latin Albums (Billboard)	70

== Certifications ==
Region	Certification	Certified units/sales
Argentina (CAPIF)	Gold	
Central America (CFC)	Gold	
Colombia	5× Platinum	100,000
Chile	2× Platinum	
Ecuador	Gold	
Mexico (AMPROFON)	4× Platinum	240,000^{‡}
Peru	Platinum	
Romania	Platinum	
United States (RIAA)	7× Platinum (Latin)	420,000^{‡}
Venezuela	Gold	
Summaries
^{‡} Sales+streaming figures based on certification alone.

== See also ==
- List of certified albums in Romania
