= Ay Vamos =

Single by J Balvin

from the album La Familia B Sides
- Released: 22 July 2014
- Genre: Reggaeton
- Length: 3:46
- Label: Universal Mexico
- Songwriters: José Osorio; René Cano; Alejandro Patiño; Alejandro Ramírez
- Producers: Sky; Bull Nene; Mosty

J Balvin singles chronology
| "Cola Song" (2014) | "Ay Vamos" (2014) | "Tranquila" (2014) |

Music video
- "Ay vamos" on YouTube

"Ay Vamos" [sic] (English: "Here We Go") is a song performed by Colombian singer J Balvin, released as the lead single of the reissue of his second studio album, La Familia B Sides, by Universal Music Mexico on 22 July 2014.

It received a nomination for the Billboard Latin Music Award for Latin Rhythm Airplay Song of the Year in 2015. A remix, featuring French Montana and Nicky Jam was released on the Furious 7 soundtrack.

As of December 2024, the music video has received over 2 billion views on YouTube.

== Track listing ==
- Digital download
1. "Ay Vamos" – 3:46

== Charts ==
=== Weekly charts ===
| Chart (2014–15) | Peak position |
|---|---|
| Bulgaria (IFPI) | 6 |
| Colombia (National-Report) | 1 |
| Dominican Republic (Monitor Latino) | 1 |
| Romania TV Airplay (Media Forest) | 8 |
| US Bubbling Under Hot 100 (Billboard) | 11 |
| US Hot Latin Songs (Billboard) | 1 |
| US Latin Airplay (Billboard) | 1 |
| US Latin Rhythm Airplay (Billboard) | 1 |
| US Latin Pop Songs (Billboard) | 1 |
| US Tropical Songs (Billboard) | 4 |
| Venezuela (Record Report) | 4 |

=== Year-end charts ===
| Chart (2014) | Position |
|---|---|
| US Hot Latin Songs (Billboard) | 35 |
| US Latin Pop Songs (Billboard) | 42 |
| Chart (2015) | Position |
| Spain (PROMUSICAE) | 31 |
| US Hot Latin Songs (Billboard) | 4 |

=== Decade-end charts ===
| Chart (2010–2019) | Position |
|---|---|
| US Hot Latin Songs (Billboard) | 34 |

== Certifications ==
| Region | Certification | Certified units/sales |
|---|---|---|
| Brazil (Pro-Música Brasil) | 2× Platinum | 120,000^{‡} |
| Italy (FIMI) | Gold | 25,000^{‡} |
| Mexico (AMPROFON) | 7× Diamond+3× Platinum | 2,280,000^{‡} |
| Spain (Promusicae) | 2× Platinum | 120,000^{‡} |
| United States (RIAA) | Diamond (Latin) | 600,000^{‡} |
^{‡} Sales+streaming figures based on certification alone.

== Awards and nominations ==
| Year | Ceremony | Award | Result |
|---|---|---|---|
| 2015 | Premios Juventud | La Más Pegajosa (Catchiest Tune) | Nominated |
| 2015 | Billboard Latin Music Awards | Latin Rhythm Song of the Year | Nominated |
| 2015 | Latin American Music Awards | Song of the Year | Nominated |
| 2015 | Latin American Music Awards | Favorite Urban Song | Nominated |
| 2015 | Latin American Music Awards | Favorite Streaming Song | Nominated |
| 2015 | Latin Grammy Awards | Best Urban Performance | Nominated |
| 2015 | Latin Grammy Awards | Best Urban Song | Won |
| 2016 | Lo Nuestro Awards | Urban Song of the Year | Nominated |

== See also ==
- List of Billboard number-one Latin songs of 2014
