= Latin Grammy Award for Best Urban Song =

Latin Grammy Award category

- Awarded for: new songs that contain at least 51% of the lyrics in Spanish or Portuguese
- Country: United States
- Presented by: The Latin Recording Academy
- First award: August 31, 2007; 19 years ago
- Currently held by: Bad Bunny, Scott Dittrich, Julia Lewis, Mag, Roberto Jose Rosado Torres, Hugo Rene Sencion Sanabria and Tyler Spry for "DTMF" (2025)
- Website: latingrammy.com

The Latin Grammy Award for Best Urban Song is an honor presented annually at the Latin Grammy Awards, a ceremony that recognizes excellence and promotes a wider awareness of cultural diversity and contributions of Latin recording artists in the United States and internationally. According to the category description guide for the 13th Latin Grammy Awards, the award is for new songs that contain at least 51% of the lyrics in Spanish or Portuguese. The accolade is awarded to the songwriter(s) of said song. Instrumental recordings and cover songs are not eligible for the category.

The award was first presented to Puerto Rican musicians Eduardo Cabra and René Pérez of the duo Calle 13 in 2007. The award has been presented three times to Puerto Rican songwriters and once to a Panamian, Spaniard and Argentine songwriter in 2008, 2010, and 2011 respectively. The only songwriter to receive this award in more than one occasion is René Pérez. In 2010, Spanish rapper La Mala Rodríguez became the first female artist to win in this field. Daddy Yankee holds the record of most nominations eight. Also, he is the only artist who has been nominated every year since the category's inception (except in 2014). In 2014, "Bailando" by Enrique Iglesias featuring Descemer Bueno & Gente De Zona became the first urban song to win this award and Song of the Year.

== Recipients ==
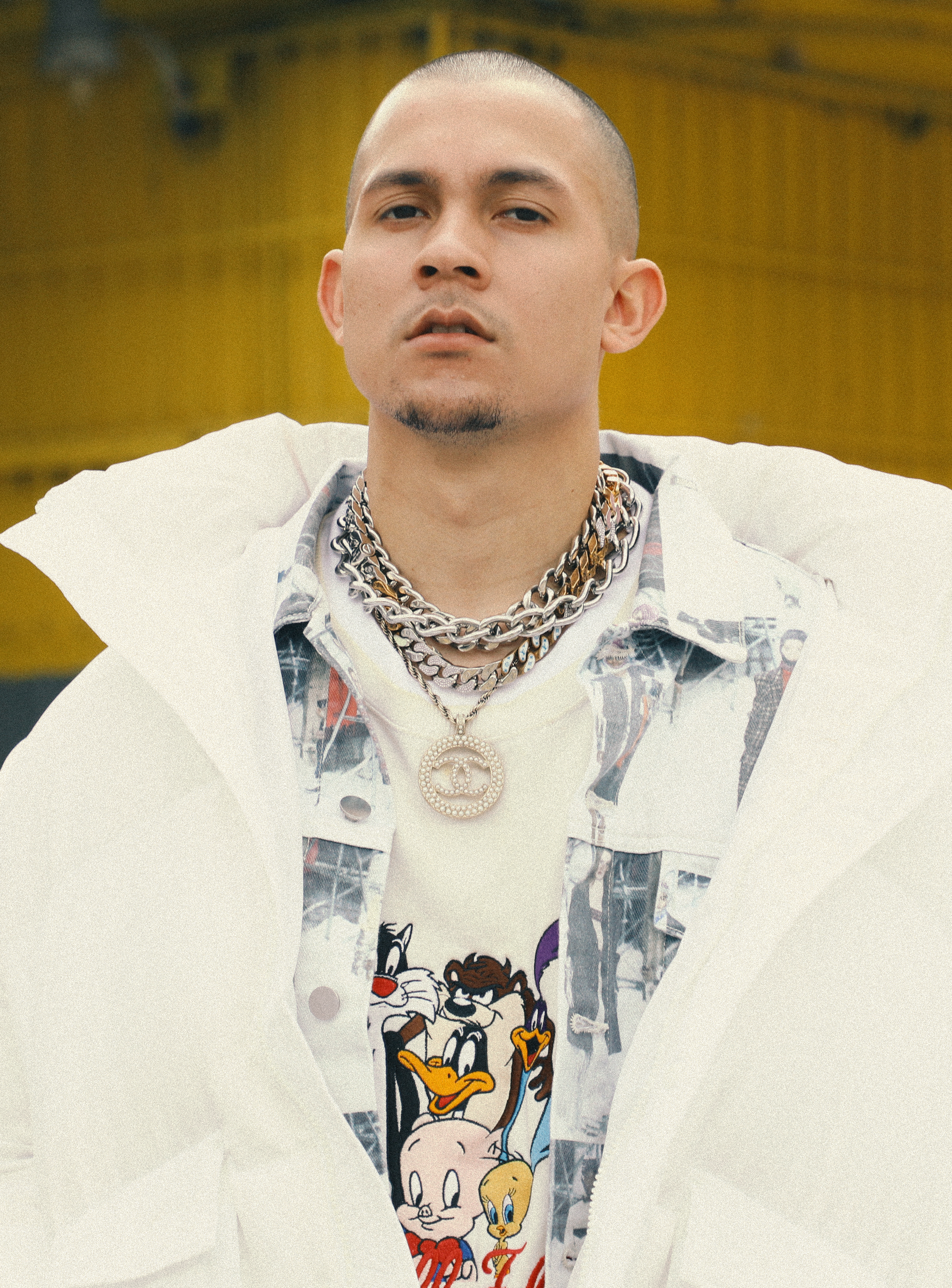
Producer Tainy won in 2009.

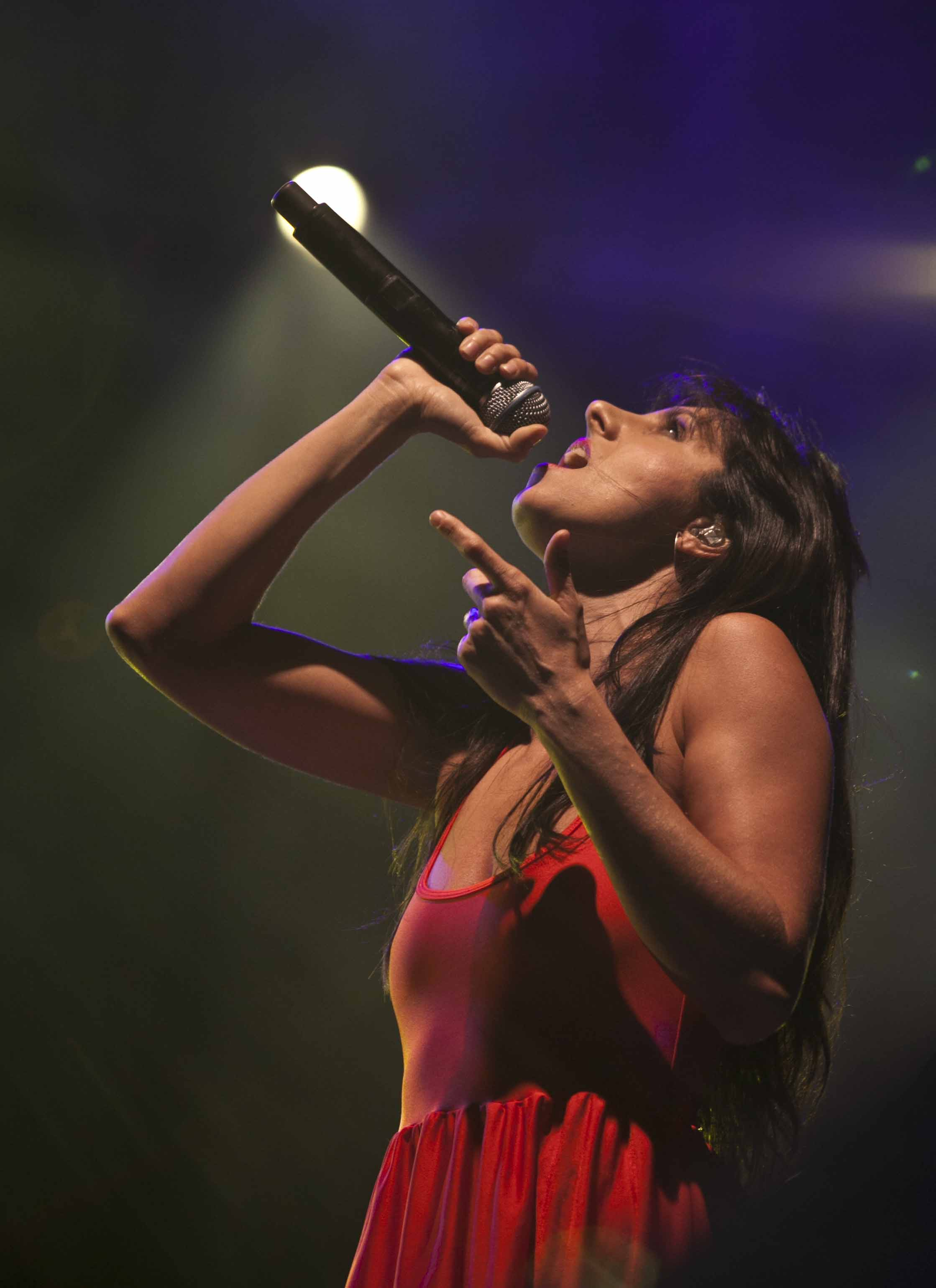
2010 winner Mala Rodríguez, the first female winner of the award.

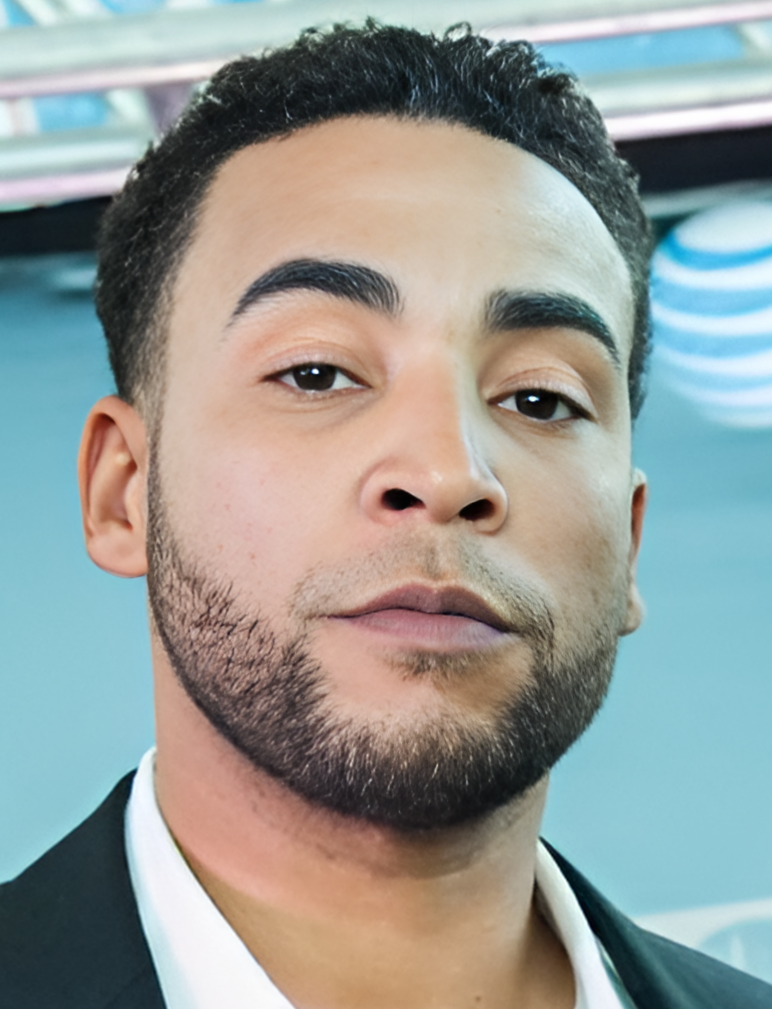
2012 winner Don Omar.

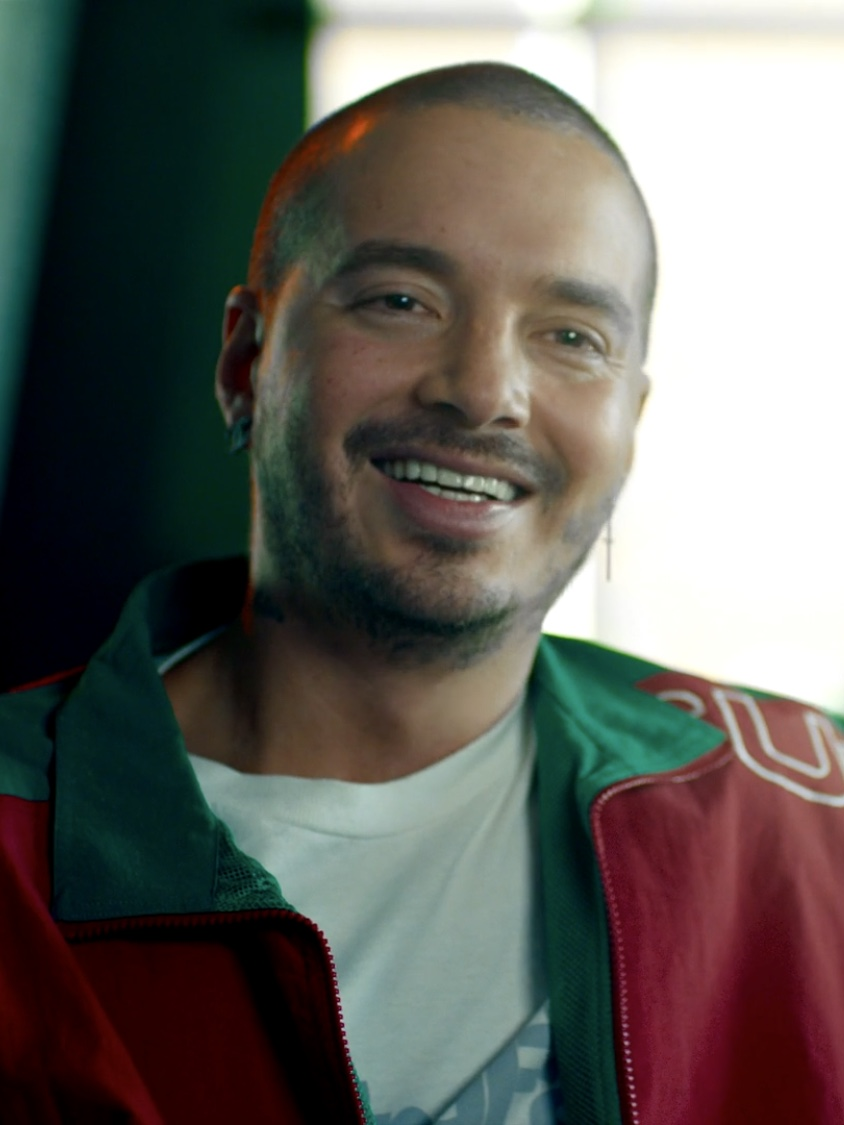
Two-time winner J Balvin.

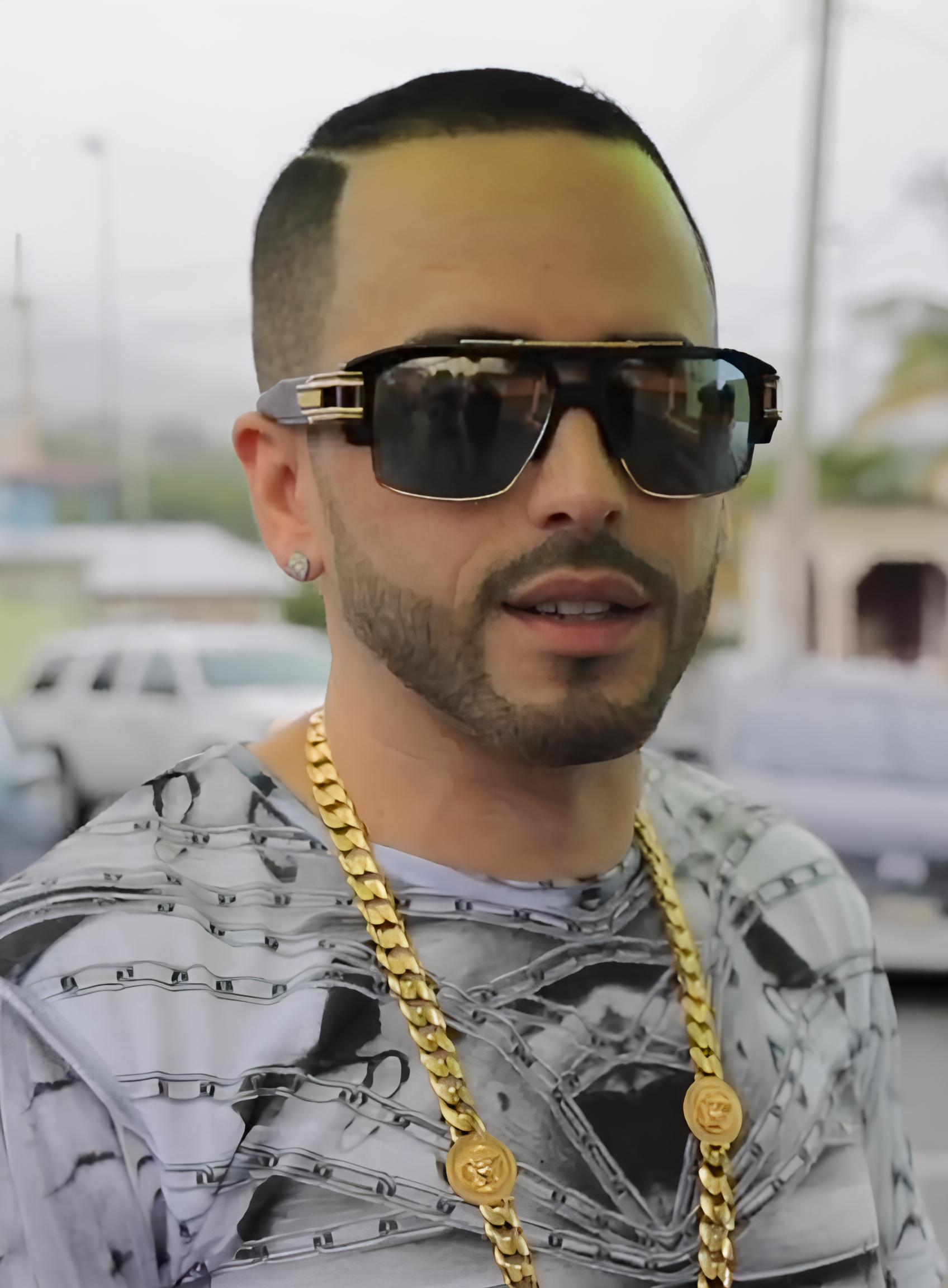
Two-time winner Yandel.

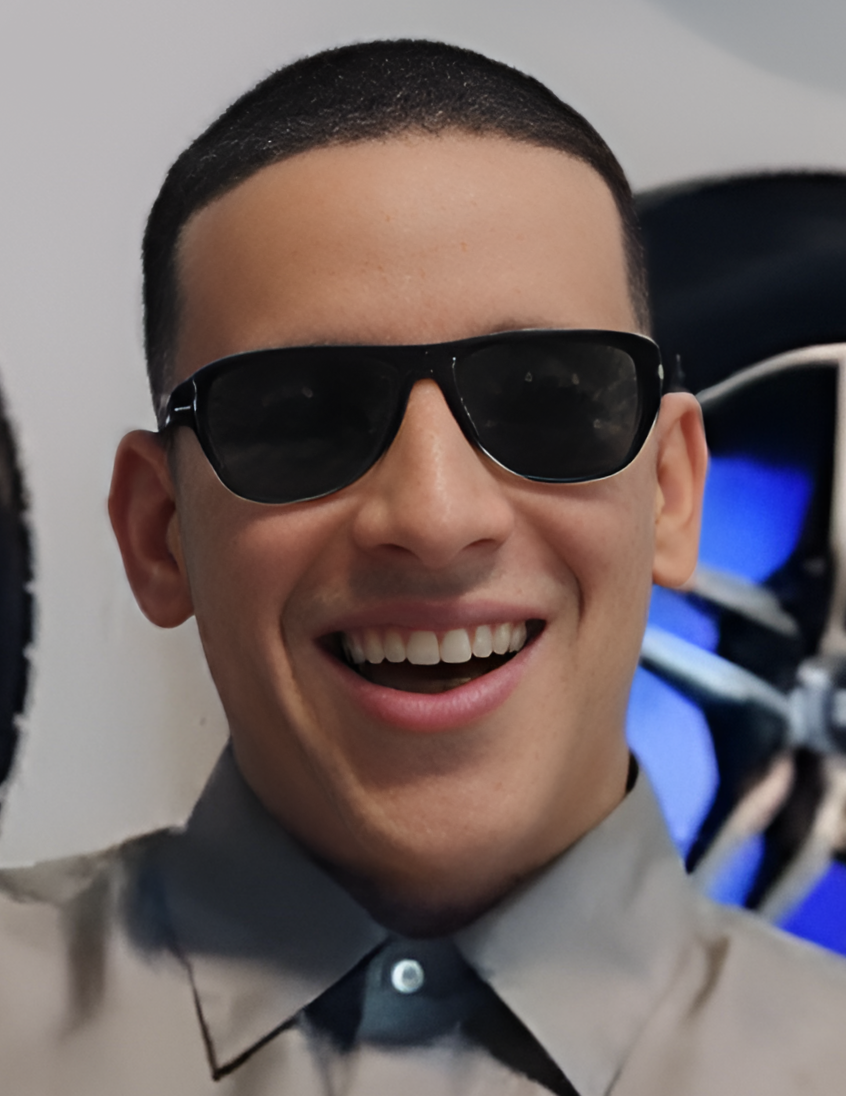
Daddy Yankee is the most awarded recipient with three wins in 2018, 2024 and 2026.

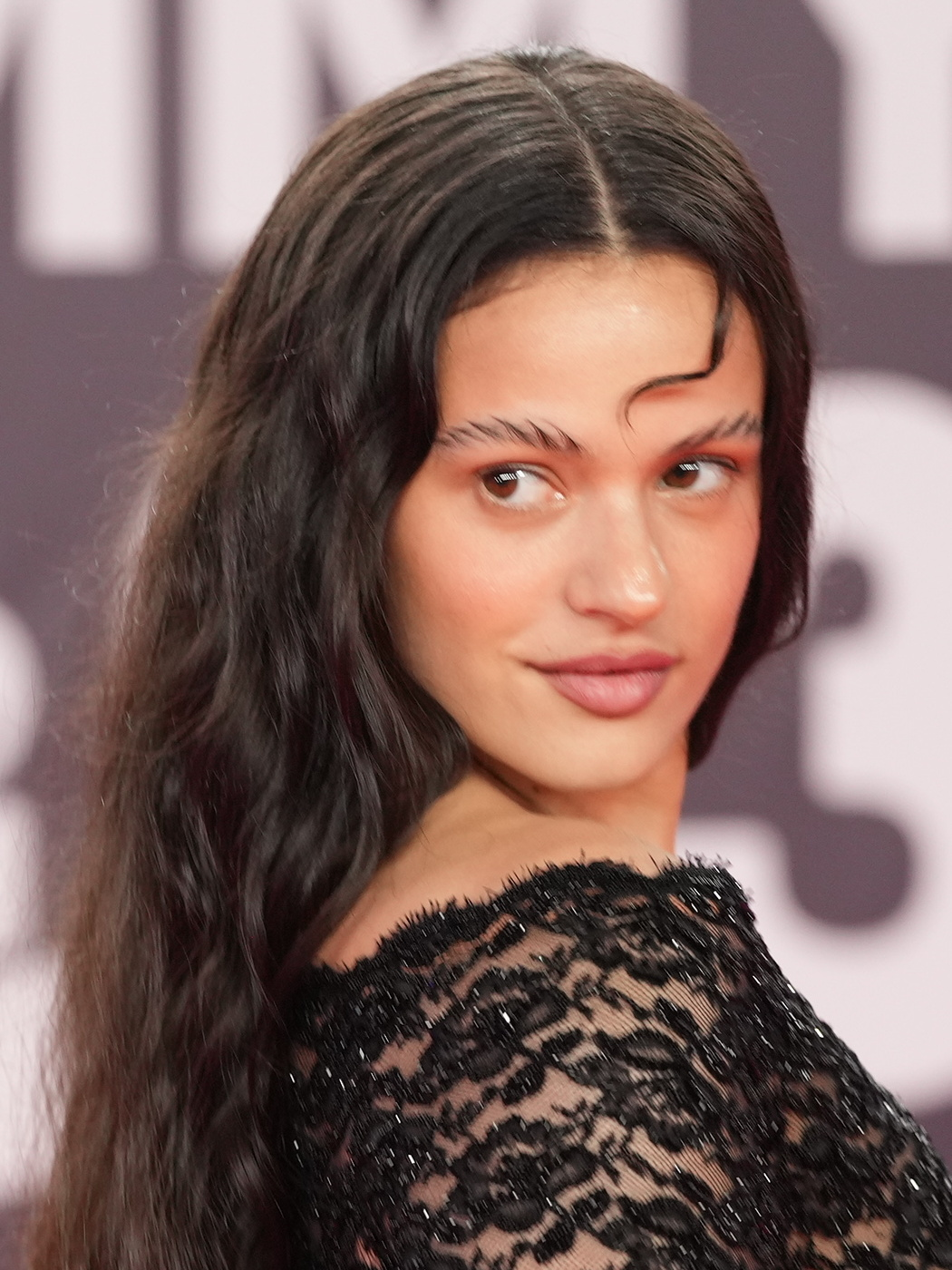
Two-time winner Rosalía.

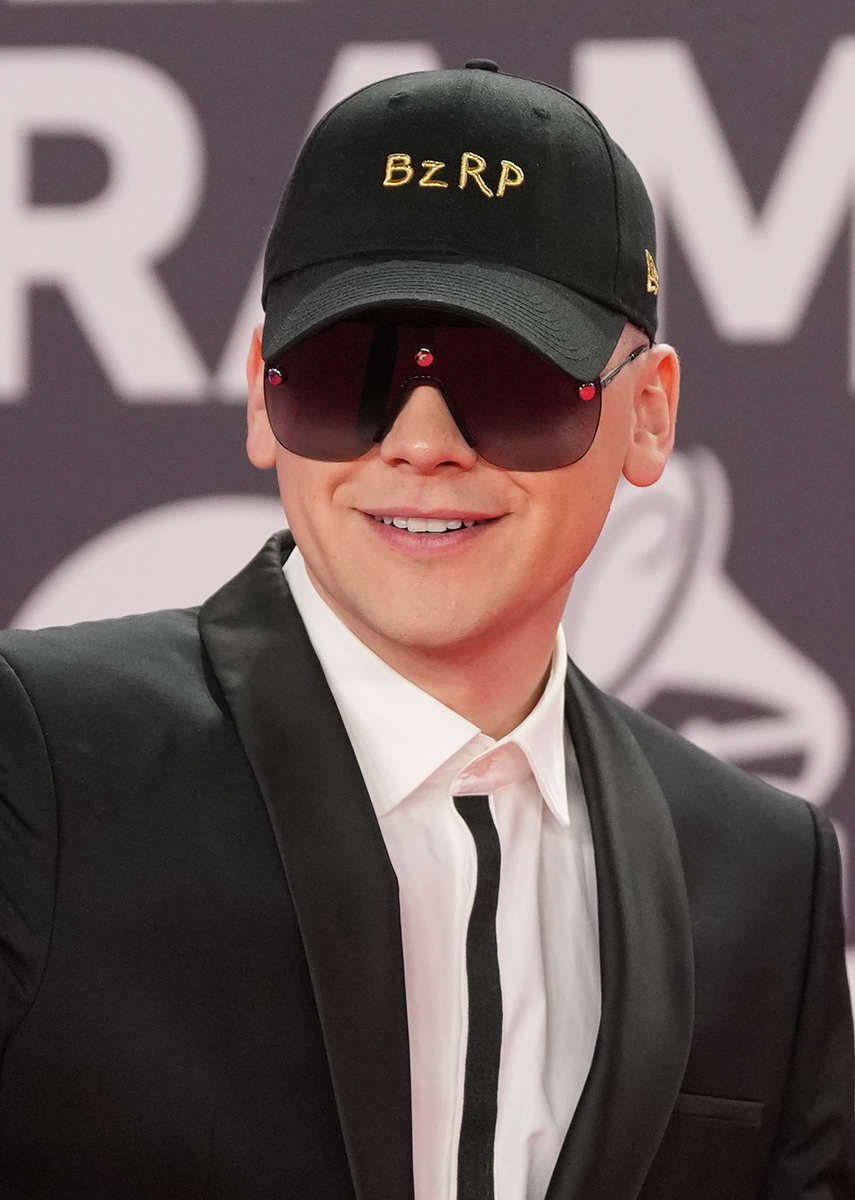
Two-time winner, Bizarrap.

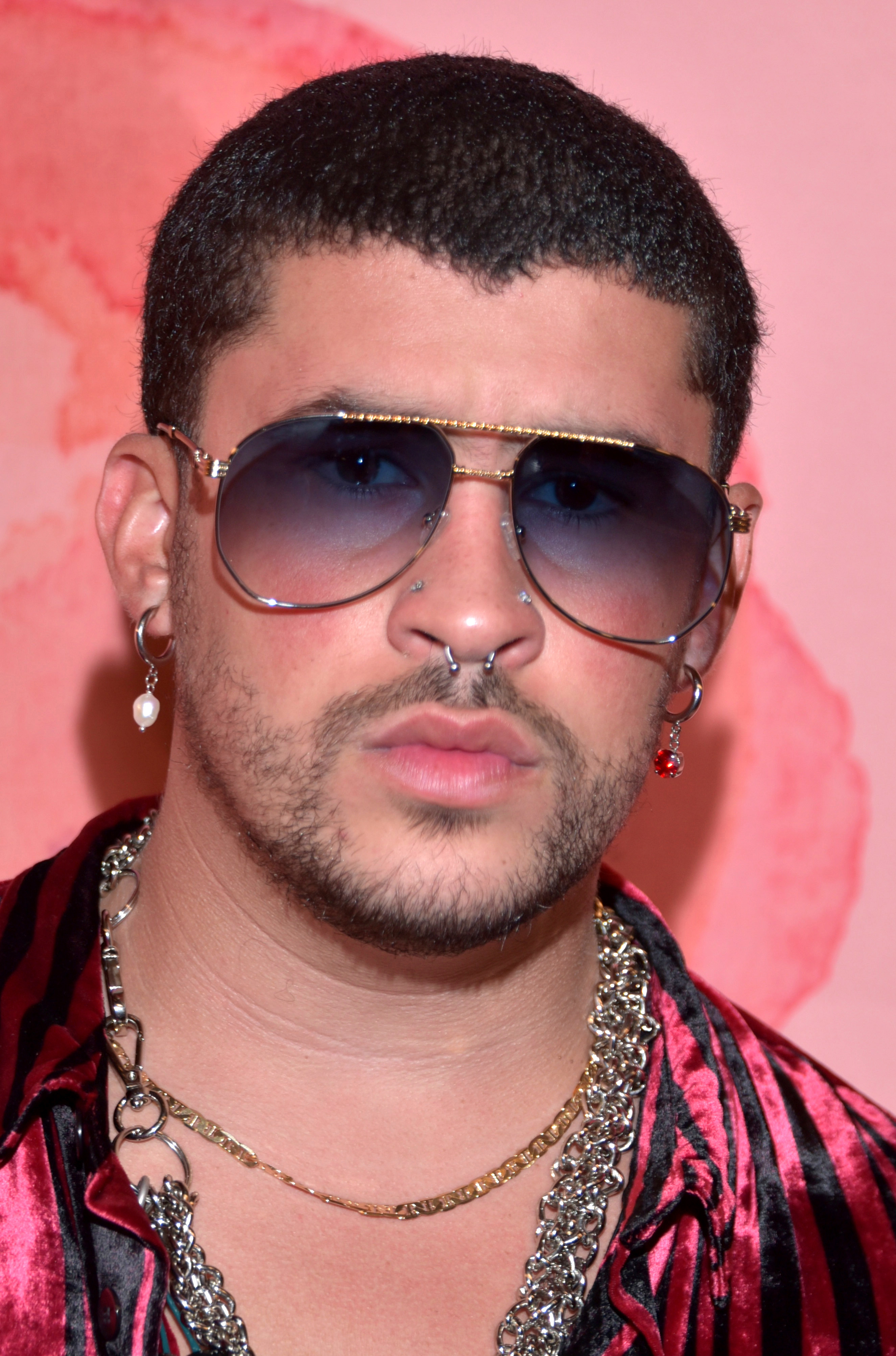
Two-Time Winner Bad Bunny

Year	Songwriter(s)	Work	Performing artist(s)	Nominees	Ref.
2007	Eduardo Cabra; Panasuyo; René Pérez	"Pa'l Norte"	Calle 13	Mathieu and Orishas – "Hay Un Son" (Orishas); will.i.am, Daddy Yankee and Fergie – "Impacto (Remix)" (Daddy Yankee featuring Fergie); Sebastian Rocca and Michael Stuart – "Mi Tumbao" (Tres Coronas featuring Michael Stuart); William Omar Landrón and Eliel Lind – "No Se De Ella (My Space)" (Don Omar featuring Wisin & Yandel)	
2008	Flex	"Te Quiero"	Flex	Tingui and Daddy Yankee – "Al Son del Boom" (Miguelito featuring Daddy Yankee); Tito El Bambino – "El Tra" (Tito El Bambino); Tego Calderón – "Ni Fu Ni Fa" (Tego Calderón); Alexis, Fido and Toby Love – "Soy Igual Que Tú" (Alexis & Fido)	
2009	Marcos Masis "Tainy"; Wisin & Yandel	"Abusadora"	Wisin & Yandel	Marcelo D2 and Nave – "Desabafo" (Marcelo D2); Daddy Yankee – "Llamado de Emergencia" (Daddy Yankee); 50 Cent, Nesty "La Mente Maestra", Wisin & Yandel – "Mujeres In The Club" (Wisin & Yandel featuring 50 Cent); Don Omar – "Sexy Robotica" (Don Omar)	
2010	La Mala Rodríguez	"No Pidas Perdón"	La Mala Rodríguez	Daddy Yankee – "Descontrol" (Daddy Yankee); Daddy Yankee – "Grito Mundial" (Daddy Yankee); Eduardo Davalos, M. Garza and R. Rodríguez – "El Hornazo" (Cartel de Santa); Everton Bonner, Don Omar, Sly Dunbar, Eliel and Lloyd Willis – "Hasta Abajo" (Don Omar); Vico C for "Sentimiento" – (Vico C featuring Arcángel)	
2011	Rafa Arcaute; Calle 13	"Baile de los Pobres"	Calle 13	Renato Carosone, Mathew Handley, Duncan Maclennas, Nicola Salerno, Andrew Stanley and Pitbull (aka Armando Pérez) – "Bon, Bon" (Pitbull); Don Omar and Lucenzo – "Danza Kuduro" (Don Omar featuring Lucenzo); Wisin & Yandel – "Estoy Enamorado" (Wisin & Yandel); Daddy Yankee and Prince Royce – "Ven Conmigo" (Daddy Yankee featuring Prince Royce)	
2012	Ramón Enrique Casillas & Don Omar	"Hasta Que Salga el Sol"	Don Omar	Max Deniro, Sak Noel, Pitbull, William Reyna and DJ Buddha – "Crazy People" (Sensato featuring Pitbull and Sak Noel); Don Omar and Milton "Alcover" Restituyo – "Dutty Love" (Don Omar featuring Natti Natasha); Alexis & Fido and Egbert Enrique Rosa Citron – "Energía" (Alexis & Fido); Daddy Yankee – "Lovumba" (Daddy Yankee)	
2013	Dante Spinetta and Emmanuel Horvilleur	"Ula Ula"	Illya Kuryaki and the Valderramas	Dj Buddah, Papayo, Pitbull, Gregor Salto and Tzvetin Todorov – "Echa Pa'lla (Manos Pa'rriba)" (Pitbull); Daddy Yankee, Eliezer Palacios, Giancarlo Rivera, Jonathan Rivera and Francisco Saldaña – "Limbo" (Daddy Yankee); Clément Dumoulin and Mala Rodríguez – "Quien Manda" (Mala Rodríguez); Jorge Drexler, Andrés Mujica Celis and Ana Tijoux – "Sacar la Voz" (Jorge Drexler and Ana Tijoux)	
2014	Descemer Bueno; Gente De Zona; Enrique Iglesias	"Bailando"	Enrique Iglesias featuring Descemer Bueno & Gente De Zona	René Pérez and Eduardo Cabra – "Adentro" (Calle 13); René Pérez and Eduardo Cabra – "Cuando Los Pies Besan El Piso" (Calle 13); J Balvin & Farruko, "6 AM" – (J Balvin & Farruko); André Célis & Ana Tijoux – "Vengo" (Ana Tijoux)	
2015	J Balvin; Rene Cano; Alejandro "Mosty" Patiño; Alejandro "Sky" Ramírez	"Ay Vamos"	J Balvin	Alexis & Fido and Juan Jesús Santana – "A Ti Te Encanta" (Alexis & Fido); Ilya, Savan Kotecha, Pitbull and Prince Royce – "Back It Up (Spanish Version)" (Prince Royce featuring Jennifer Lopez and Pitbull); Tego Calderón and Ernesto Padilla – "Dando Break" (Tego Calderón); Carlos Ortiz, Luis Ortiz and Daddy Yankee – "Sígueme Y Te Sigo" (Daddy Yankee)	
2016	Egbert Rosa Cintrón; Farruko; Eduardo A. Vargas Berrios; Yandel	"Encantadora"	Yandel	Miguel Correa, Cosculluela, Daddy Yankee, José Gómez, Roberto Martínez Lebrón, Jorge Oquendo and Orlando Javier Valle Vega – "A Donde Voy" (Cosculluela featuring Daddy Yankee); De La Ghetto & Alejandro Ramírez Suárez – "Acércate" (De La Ghetto); Juan Alonzo V. Angulo, Francisco Espinoza, David Rolas, Sito Rocks and Rafael Vargas – "12 Rosas" (David Rolas featuring Fulanito and Sito Rocks); Arianna Puello – "Hardcore y Feroz"	
2017	Rafael Arcaute; Igor Koshkendey; Residente	"Somos Anormales"	Residente	Emicida and Rael – "A Chapa É Quente! (Língua Franca)" (Emicida & Rael); Luis Díaz, Alejandro Estrada, Bruno Og and Jonathan Torres – "Coqueta" (Ghetto Kids); Nicky Jam, Juan Diego Medina Vélez and Cristhian Mena – "El Amante" (Nicky Jam); J Balvin, Camila Cabello, Phillip Kembo, Johnny Michell, Pitbull, Rosina "Soaky Siren" Russell, Jamie Sanderson and Tinashe "T-Collar" Sibanda – "Hey Ma" (Spanish version) (Pitbull and J Balvin featuring Camila Cabello); Lápiz Consciente and Vico C – "Papa" (Lápiz Consciente featuring Vico C)	
2018	Urbani Mota Cedeño; Juan G. Rivera Vazquez; Luis Jorge Romero; Daddy Yankee	"Dura"	Daddy Yankee	Anitta, J. Balvin, Justin Quiles & Alejandro Ramírez – "Downtown" (Anitta Featuring J Balvin); Rene David Cano, Andy Clay, Karol G, Antonio Rayo & Omar Sabino – "Mi Cama" (Karol G); J Balvin, Bad Bunny, Juan M. Frías, Luian Malave, Prince Royce, Edgar Semper & Xavier Semper – "Sensualidad" (Bad Bunny, Prince Royce & J Balvin); J. Balvin, Nicky Jam & Juan Diego Medina Vélez – "X" (Nicky Jam & J Balvin)	
2019	J Balvin; Mariachi Budda; Frank Dukes; Teo Halm; El Guincho; Alejandro Ramirez; Rosalía	"Con Altura"	Rosalía and J Balvin featuring El Guincho	Ozuna and Vicente Saavedra – "Baila Baila Baila" (Ozuna); J Balvin, Rene Cano, De La Ghetto and Alejandro Ramirez – "Caliente" (De La Ghetto featuring J Balvin); Kevyn Mauricio Cruz, Kevin Mauricio Jimenez Londoño, Bryan Lezcano Chaverra, Josh Mendez, Sech and Jorge Valdes – "Otro Trago" (Sech featuring Darell); René Cano, ChocQuibtown, Kevyn Cruz Moreno, Juan Diego Medina Vélez, Andrés David Restrepo, Mateo Tejada Giraldo, Andrés Uribe Marín, Juan Vargas & Doumbia Yohann – "Pa' Olvidarte" (ChocQuibtown)	
2020	Pablo Diaz-Reixa "El Guincho"; Ozuna; Rosalía	"Yo x Ti, Tu x Mi"	Rosalía & Ozuna	Anuel AA, Jhay Cortez, Marco Masis "Tainy" & Ozuna – "Adicto" (Tainy, Anuel AA y Ozuna); Alejandro "Pututi" Arce, Ángel Alberto Arce, Luis Eduardo Cedeno Konig "Pucho", Roque Alberto Cedeno Konig "Tucutu", Gente De Zona, Paul Irizarry Suau "Echo", Andrea Mangiamanchi "Elena Rose", Daniel Joel Márquez Díaz, Yasmil Jesús Marrufo & Juan Morelli – "Muchacha" (Gente De Zona y Becky G); Anitta, Tynashe Beam, Diplo, Eric Alberto-Lopez, MC Lan & Tropkillaz – "Rave de Favela" (MC Lan, Anitta, BEAM and Major Lazer); J Balvin, O 'Neill, Justin Quiles, Alejandro "Sky" Ramírez & Taiko – "Rojo" (J Balvin)	
2021	Descemer Bueno, El Funky, Gente De Zona, Yadam González, Beatriz Luengo, Maykel Osorbo & Yotuel	"Patria y Vida"	Yotuel, Gente De Zona, Descemer Bueno, Maykel Osorbo, El Funky	Farina, Joshua Javier Méndez, Sech, Jonathan Emmanuel Tobar & Jorge Valdés Vásquez – "A Fuego" (Farina); J Balvin, Alejandro Borrero, Jhay Cortez, Kevyn Mauricio Cruz Moreno, Derek Drymon, Mark Harrison, Stephen Hillenburg, Alejandro Ramírez, Ivanni Rodríguez, Blaise Smith, Tainy & Juan Camilo Vargas – "Agua" (Tainy & J Balvin); Bad Bunny, Jhay Cortez, Nydia Laner, Gabriel Mora, Egbert Rosa & Tainy – "Dákiti" (Bad Bunny & Jhay Cortez); Myke Towers & Jay Wheeler – "La Curiosidad" (Jay Wheeler, DJ Nelson & Myke Towers)	
2022	Bad Bunny	"Tití Me Preguntó"	Bad Bunny	Rauw Alejandro & Chencho Corleone, José M. Collazo, Jorge Cedeño Echevarria, Luis Jonuel González, Eric Pérez Rovira, Jorge E. Pizarro Ruiz & Nino Karlo Segarra – "Desesperados" (Rauw Alejandro & Chencho Corleone); Tainy, Bad Bunny & Julieta Venegas – "Lo Siento BB:/" (Bad Bunny, Tainy & Julieta Venegas); Luis Miguel Gomez Castaño, Becky G & Karol G, Ovy on the Drums, Justin Quiles, Elena Rose & Daniel Uribe – "Mamiii" (Becky G & Karol G); Samantha M. Cámara, Nicky Jam, Vicente Jiménez, Dallas James Koehlke, Manuel Larrad & Juan Diego Medina Vélez – "Ojos Rojos" (Nicky Jam)	
2023	Santiago Alvarado, Bizarrap & Quevedo	"Quevedo: Bzrp Music Sessions, Vol. 52"	Bizarrap featuring Quevedo	Maria Becerra – "Automático" (Maria Becerra); Bad Bunny & Austin Santos – "La Jumpa" (Arcangel featuring Bad Bunny); Nelson Onell Diaz, Farruko, Gocho, Franklin Jovani Martinez & Eric Perez Rovira – "Mi Mejor Canción" (Gocho featuring Farruko); Kevyn Mauricio Cruz, Karol G, Ovy on the Drums & Shakira – "TQG" (Karol G featuring Shakira); Jowan, Andres David Restrepo, Joan Manuel Ubinas Jimenez & Yandel – "Yandel 150" (Yandel & Feid)	
2024	Daddy Yankee	"Bonita"	Daddy Yankee	Quevedo – "Columbia" (Quevedo); Feid, Nicolás Jaña Galleguillos, Gabriel Mora Quintero, Andrés David Restrepo Echavarria, Sky Rompiendo & Myke Towers – "El Cielo" (Sky Rompiendo, Feid & Myke Towers); Julio Emmanuel Batista Santos, Carlos Alberto Butter Aguila, Orlando J. Cepeda Matos, Ralph Jemar Milln Calderon, Jose Reyes, Myke Towers & Siggy Vazquez Rodriguez – "La Falda" (Myke Towers); Feid – "Luna" (Feid featuring ATL Jacob); Karol G, Daniel Esteban Gutiérrez, Ovy on the Drums & Peso Pluma – "Qlona" (Karol G featuring Peso Pluma)	
2025	Bad Bunny, Scott Dittrich, Julia Lewis, Mag, Roberto Jose Rosado Torres, Hugo Rene Sencion Sanabria & Tyler Spry	"DTMF"	Bad Bunny	Édgar Barrera, Kevyn Mauricio Cruz Moreno, Luis Miguel Gómez Castaño, Manuel Lorente Freire & Maluma – "Cosas Pendientes" (Maluma); Trueno & Young Miko – "En la City" (Trueno featuring Young Miko); Bad Bunny, Julio Gastón, Luis Amed Irizarry, Marcos Masis, Jay Anthony Nuñez & Roberto Jose Rosado Torres – "La Mudanza" (Bad Bunny); Alejandro Avila, Álvaro Díaz, Manuel Lara, Nathy Peluso & Joyce Francue Santana Febres – "Xq Eres Así" (Álvaro Diaz featuring Nathy Peluso)	
2026	Santiago Alvarado, Bizarrap & Daddy Yankee	"Daddy Yankee: Bzrp Music Sessions, Vol. 0/66"	Bizarrap & Daddy Yankee	"Buenos Términos" – Rauw Alejandro, René Basabe, Javier Cortes del Peso, Eduardo Puche, Miguel Puche, Nino K. Segarra & Daniel Silva de Sousa, songwriters (Rauw Alejandro); "Por Si Mañana No Estoy" – Omar Courtz, songwriter (Omar Courtz); "Reliquia Do 2T" – DJ GU, MC Dkziin, MC FR da Norte, MC Joãozinho VT, MC Tuto & MC Vine7, songwriters (Various artists); "Yo y Tú" – Beéle, Kevyn Mauricio Cruz "Keityn", Diego Leon Vélez, Ovy on the Drums, Quevedo & Cristian Andrés Salazar, songwriters (Ovy on the Drums, Quevedo & Beéle)	

== Most Wins ==
=== 3 Wins ===
- Daddy Yankee

=== 2 Wins ===
- Bad Bunny
- Bizarrap
- Residente
- Rosalia

== Most Nominations ==
=== 13 Nominations ===
- Daddy Yankee

=== 10 Nominations ===
- J Balvin

=== 7 Nominations ===
- Bad Bunny

=== 4 Nominations ===
- Karol G
- Ovy On The Drums

== See also ==
- Billboard Latin Music Award for Latin Rhythm Airplay Song of the Year
- Lo Nuestro Award for Urban Song of the Year
