= 6 AM =

2013 single by J Balvin

Single by J Balvin featuring Farruko

from the album La Familia
- Released: October 15, 2013
- Genre: Hip hop; reggaeton
- Length: 4:03
- Label: Capitol Latin
- Songwriter: José Álvaro Osorio Balvín
- Producers: Sky; Mosty

J Balvin singles chronology
"Sola" (2013)	"6 AM" (2013)	"Cola Song" (2014)

"6 AM" is a song by Colombian singer J Balvin featuring Puerto Rican singer Farruko. It was released by Capitol Latin as the fourth and last single from Balvin's debut studio album La Familia (2013). The song was nominated for Best Urban Performance and Best Urban Song at the 15th Latin Grammy Awards. It won the Billboard Latin Music Award for Latin Rhythm Airplay Song of the Year in 2015. As of May 2025, the music video has received over 1.2 billion views on YouTube.

== Charts ==
=== Weekly charts ===
Chart (2014)	Peak position
Bulgaria (IFPI)	11
Colombia (National-Report)	4
Dominican Republic (Monitor Latino)	6
Mexico (Billboard Mexican Airplay)	30
Romania (Romanian Top 100)	2
Spain (Promusicae)	22
US Hot Latin Songs (Billboard)	3
US Latin Pop Songs (Billboard)	2
US Tropical Songs (Billboard)	1
US Latin Airplay (Billboard)	1
US Latin Rhythm Airplay (Billboard)	1
Venezuela (Record Report)	4

=== Year-end charts ===
Chart (2013)	Position
Colombia (National-Report)	34
Chart (2014)	Position
Colombia (National-Report)	24
Dominican Republic (Monitor Latino)	6
US Hot Latin Songs (Billboard)	7
US Latin Pop Songs (Billboard)	4
US Latin Tropical Airplay (Billboard)	6
US Latin Rhythm Airplay (Billboard)	1
Chart (2015)	Position
US Hot Latin Songs (Billboard)	65

=== Decade-end charts ===
Chart (2010–2019)	Position
US Hot Latin Songs (Billboard)	33

== Certifications ==
Region	Certification	Certified units/sales
Brazil (Pro-Música Brasil)	Gold	30,000^{‡}
Mexico (AMPROFON)	2× Diamond+Gold	630,000^{‡}
Spain (Promusicae)	2× Platinum	80,000^{‡}
United States (RIAA)	Diamond (Latin)	600,000^{‡}
Streaming
Spain (Promusicae)	Gold	4,000,000^{†}
^{‡} Sales+streaming figures based on certification alone.^{†} Streaming-only figures based on certification alone.

== Accolades ==
Year	Ceremony	Award	Result
2014	Premios Juventud	The Perfect Combination	Nominated
2014	Latin Grammy Awards	Best Urban Performance	Nominated
2014	Latin Grammy Awards	Best Urban Song	Nominated
2015	Lo Nuestro Awards	Urban Song of the Year	Won
2015	Lo Nuestro Awards	Urban Collaboration of the Year	Won
2015	Billboard Latin Music Awards	Hot Latin Song of the Year	Nominated
2015	Billboard Latin Music Awards	Hot Latin Song of the Year; Vocal Event	Nominated
2015	Billboard Latin Music Awards	Airplay Song of the Year	Nominated
2015	Billboard Latin Music Awards	Digital Song of the Year	Nominated
2015	Billboard Latin Music Awards	Latin Rhythm Song of the Year	Won

== See also ==
- List of Billboard Hot Latin Songs and Latin Airplay number ones of 2014
