= Tranquila =

2012 single by J Balvin

Single by J Balvin

from the album La Familia
- Released: October 15, 2012; August 5, 2014 (Eleni Foureira remix)
- Genre: Reggaeton
- Length: 3:19; 4:05 (Eleni Foureira remix)
- Label: Capitol Latin; EMI Mexico (Eleni Foureira remix)
- Songwriter: J Balvin

J Balvin singles chronology
"Yo Te Lo Dije" (2012)	"Tranquila" (2012)	"Sola" (2013)

Alternative cover
- Duet with Eleni Foureira

J Balvin singles chronology
"Ay Vamos" (2014)	"Tranquila" (2014)	"Tu Sombra" (2014)

Eleni Foureira singles chronology
"Party Sleep Repeat" (2014)	"Tranquila" (2014)	"Mou Pan i Agapi" (2014)

"Tranquila" (English: "Relax") is a song by Colombian singer J Balvin, and included in his first album La Familia (2013). It was released as the second single from the album on October 15, 2012.

== Track listing ==
- Digital download
1. "Tranquila" – 3:19
- Digital download
1. "Tranquila (feat. Eleni Foureira)" – 4:05

== Eleni Foureira version ==
In June 2014, J Balvin performed the song at the 2014 MAD Video Music Awards with Greek singer Eleni Foureira. This version was released as a single on August 5, 2014. It is featured on Foureira's third studio album Anemos Agapis (2014).

== Charts ==
Chart (2012–2013)	Peak position
Bulgaria (IFPI)	3
Colombia (National-Report)	3
Greece (Billboard)	1
Romania (Romanian Top 100)	2
US Hot Latin Songs (Billboard)	42
US Latin Pop Airplay (Billboard)	31
US Latin Airplay (Billboard)	49
US Latin Rhythm Airplay (Billboard)	8

The song had great repercussions in Greece, Bulgaria, Romania and Turkey. The song reached number one on Turkey's biggest music channel Number 1. The song entered the top 5 in Austria. It also managed to enter the top 10 in countries such as Albania, Sweden, Russia, Ukraine, Serbia and Hungary. This song was Balvin's first international hit after Yo Te Lo Dije

== Certifications ==
Region	Certification	Certified units/sales
United States (RIAA)	Platinum (Latin)	60,000^{‡}
^{‡} Sales+streaming figures based on certification alone.
