= Yo Te Lo Dije =

Single by J Balvin

from the album La Familia
- Released: March 15, 2012
- Length: 3:40
- Label: Capitol Latin

J Balvin singles chronology
"En Lo Oscuro" (2011)	"Yo Te Lo Dije" (2012)	"Tranquila" (2012)

"Yo Te Lo Dije" (English: "I Told You") is a song by Colombian singer J Balvin. The song was released digitally on March 15, 2012.

== Track listing ==
Digital download
No.	Title	Length
1.	"Yo Te Lo Dije"	3:40

== Charts ==
=== Weekly charts ===
Chart (2012–13)	Peak position
Colombia (National-Report)	1
Romania (Romanian Top 100)	1
US Hot Latin Songs (Billboard)	13
US Latin Pop Airplay (Billboard)	9
US Tropical Airplay (Billboard)	4
US Latin Airplay (Billboard)	2
US Latin Rhythm Airplay (Billboard)	2
Venezuela Top Latino (Record Report)	18

=== Year-end charts ===
Chart (2013)	Position
US Latin Songs	45
US Latin Pop Songs	43
US Latin Tropical Airplay	22

== Certifications ==
Region	Certification	Certified units/sales
United States (RIAA)	2× Platinum (Latin)	120,000^{‡}
^{‡} Sales+streaming figures based on certification alone.

== See also ==
- List of number-one songs of 2012 in Colombia
