= Sola (J Balvin song) =

Single by J Balvin

from the album La Familia
- Released: June 12, 2013
- Genre: Reggaeton; R&B
- Length: 4:12
- Label: Capitol Latin
- Songwriter: José Álvaro Osorio Balvin
- Producer: Sky

J Balvin singles chronology
| "Tranquila" (2012) | "Sola" (2013) | "The Way" (remix) (2013) |

Music video
- "Sola" on YouTube

"Sola" (English: "Alone") is a song by Colombian singer J Balvin. It was released as the third single from his first studio album La Familia (2013) on June 12, 2013. The song incorporates the sound of traditional reggaeton and R&B. "Sola" became fifth number-one hit in Colombia (National-Report) chart.

== Background ==
"Sola" was written by J Balvin, composed by Sky, a DJ from Medellín and recorded in Miami and his native Medellín. In an interview with El Espectador, Balvin was asked about the production and the intention of the song. He said "Is a commercial rap designed for the clubs... the lyrics aren’t vulgar, it is about the call that one is waiting to go out and have a good time". "Sola" is a rap, featuring a melodic chorus, very close to R&B.

== Chart performance ==
The song debuted at number 5 on the National-Report Top 100 chart for the week of June 10, 2013. Three more weeks, the song topped the chart for two consecutive weeks, replacing "Bailar Contigo" by Colombian singer Carlos Vives and being succeeded by the same song, the following week. In Venezuela, the song debuted and peaked at number 100 on the Record Report Top 100 chart and peaked at number 28 on the Top Latino chart.

== Track listing ==
Digital download
| No. | Title | Writer(s) | Producer(s) | Length |
|---|---|---|---|---|
| 1. | "Sola" | José Osorio Balvin | Sky | 3:47 |

== Charts ==
| Chart (2013) | Peak position |
|---|---|
| Colombia (National-Report) | 1 |
| Venezuela (Record Report) | 100 |

== Certifications ==
| Region | Certification | Certified units/sales |
|---|---|---|
| United States (RIAA) | Gold (Latin) | 30,000^{‡} |
^{‡} Sales+streaming figures based on certification alone.

== See also ==
- List of number-one songs of 2013 (Colombia)
