= Wisin discography =

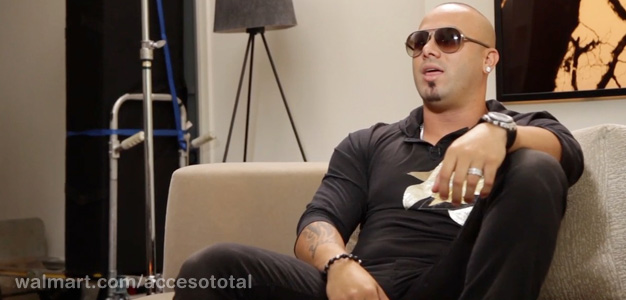
- Studio albums: 6
- Live albums: 2
- Singles: 26
- Music videos: 33
- Featured singles: 40

The discography of Puerto Rican reggaeton rapper and singer-songwriter Wisin as a solo artist, consists of six studio albums, twenty six singles as lead singer, forty singles as a featured artist and thirty three music videos.

== Albums ==
=== Studio albums ===
List of albums, with selected details
Title	Album details	Peak chart positions						Certifications
Title	Album details	US	US Latin	US Rap	US Latin Rhythm	ARG	MEX	Certifications
El Sobreviviente	Released: February 10, 2004; Label: Fresh Productions; Format: CD, digital download	—	20	—	16	—	—	
El Regreso del Sobreviviente	Released: March 18, 2014; Label: Sony Music Latin; Format: CD, digital download	50	3	9	1	9	74	
Los Vaqueros: La Trilogía	Released: September 4, 2015; Label: Sony Music Latin; Format: CD, digital download	—	1	15	1	—	—	RIAA: Platinum (Latin)
Victory	Released: December 1, 2017; Label: Sony Music Latin; Format: CD, digital download	125	2	—	2	—	—	AMPROFON: Gold
Mr. W	Released: April 26, 2024; Label: Sony Music Latin; Format: Digital download, streaming	—	47	—	25	—	—	
"—" denotes releases that did not chart.

=== Collaborative albums ===
List of albums, with selected details
Title	Album details	Peak chart positions		Certifications
Title	Album details	US Latin	US Latin Rhythm	Certifications
Los Legendarios 001	Released: February 4, 2021; Label: Sony Music Latin, La Base Music Group, WK Records; Format: CD, digital download	8	7	
Multimillo, Vol. 1	Released: July 1, 2022; Label: Sony Music Latin, La Base Music Group, WK Records; Format: CD, digital download	—	—	RIAA: Gold (Latin)
"—" denotes releases that did not chart.

== Singles ==
=== As lead artist ===
List of singles, with selected chart positions, showing year released and album name
Title	Year	Peak chart positions											Certifications	Album
Title	Year	US	US Latin	US Latin Rhythm	US Latin Pop	US Latin Tropical	MEX	SPA	VEN	COL	FRA	SWI	Certifications	Album
"La Gitana"	2004	—	—	—	—	40	—	—	—	—	—	—		El Sobreviviente
"Saoco" (featuring Daddy Yankee)	2004	—	—	—	—	38	—	—	—	—	—	—		El Sobreviviente
"Que Viva La Vida"	2013	—	5	1	1	2	13	—	—	—	—	—	AMPROFON: Gold	El Regreso del Sobreviviente
"Adrenalina" (featuring Jennifer Lopez and Ricky Martin)	2014	94	2	1	2	15	4	3	—	1	122	57	FIMI: Gold; AMPROFON: Platinum; PROMUSICAE: 2× Platinum	El Regreso del Sobreviviente
"Nota de Amor" (with Carlos Vives featuring Daddy Yankee)	2015	—	5	1	2	29	35	76	14	2	—	—	RIAA: 5× Platinum (Latin); AMPROFON: Gold	Wisin Presenta: Vaqueros La Trilogía
"Que Se Sienta El Deseo" (featuring Ricky Martin)	2015	—	15	4	4	37	35	—	—	—	—	—		Wisin Presenta: Vaqueros La Trilogía
"Tu Libertad" (featuring Prince Royce)	2015	—	—	—	—	—	—	99	—	—	—	—		Wisin Presenta: Vaqueros La Trilogía
"Vacaciones" (solo or featuring Zion & Lennox, Tito El Bambino, and Don Omar)	2016	—	11	1	1	—	17	13	—	—	—	—	RIAA: 9× Platinum (Latin); FIMI: Gold; PROMUSICAE: 3× Platinum; AMPROFON: 4× Platinum+Gold	Victory
"Escápate Conmigo" (featuring Ozuna)	2017	63	3	1	2	—	10	8	1	—	—	—	RIAA: 4× Platinum (Latin); FIMI: Platinum; PROMUSICAE: 4× Platinum; AMPROFON: 2× Diamond+Platinum+Gold	Victory
"Dulce" (with Leslie Grace)	2017	—	—	—	—	—	—	—	—	—	—	—		Non-album singles
"Move Your Body" (featuring Timbaland and Bad Bunny)	2017	—	—	—	—	—	—	—	—	—	—	—		Victory
"Todo Comienza En La Disco" (featuring Yandel and Daddy Yankee)	2018	—	16	1	4	—	11	72	—	—	—	—	AMPROFON: Gold	Victory
"Quisiera Alejarme" (featuring Ozuna and CNCO)	2018	—	13	1	7	—	—	—	—	—	—	—	AMPROFON: Gold	Victory
"Mala Mala" (with el Micha)	2018	—	—	—	—	—	—	—	—	—	—	—		Non-album singles
"Si Me Das Tu Amor" (with Carlos Vives)	2019	—	24	1	4	1	—	—	—	—	—	—	RIAA: Gold (Latin)	Non-album singles
"3G" (Jon Z, Don Chezina featuring Farruko, Yandel, Chencho Corleone, Myke Towers)	2019	—	44	—	—	—	—	39	—	—	—	—	PROMUSICAE: Gold	Non-album singles
"Una Noche" (with Rauw Alejandro)	2019	—	—	—	—	—	—	—	—	—	—	—		Non-album singles
"Boogaloo Supreme" (with Victor Manuelle)	2020	—	—	49	49	5	—	—	—	—	—	—		Non-album singles
"Watablamblam" (with Jumbo and Farruko)	2020	—	—	—	—	—	—	—	—	—	—	—		Non-album singles
"Gistro Amarillo" (with Ozuna)	2020	—	20	1	—	—	—	—	—	—	—	—		ENOC
"Enemigos Ocultos" (with Ozuna, Myke Towers, featuring Arcángel, Cosculluela, Juanka)	2020	—	17	—	—	—	—	23	—	—	—	—		ENOC
"Mi Niña" (with Myke Towers, Los Legendarios or Remix with Maluma, Anitta)	2020	—	10	1	—	—	1	5	—	6	—	—	RIAA: 8× Platinum (Latin); RIAA: Platinum (Latin) (Remix); PROMUSICAE: 2× Platinum	Los Legendarios
"No Me Acostumbro" (with Ozuna, Reik, featuring Miky Woodz, Los Legendarios)	2020	—	—	—	—	—	—	—	—	—	—	—	RIAA: Platinum (Latin)	Los Legendarios
"Fiel" (with Jhay Cortez, Los Legendarios or Remix with Anuel AA featuring Myke Towers)	2021	62	5	1	—	—	—	1	15	—	—	81	RIAA: 14× Platinum (Latin); RIAA: 8× Platinum (Latin) (Remix); PROMUSICAE: 5× Platinum; PROMUSICAE: Platinum (Remix); AMPROFON: Diamond	Los Legendarios
"Playita" (with Los Legendarios)	2021	—	50	12	—	—	—	—	—	—	—	—		TBA
"Emojis de Corazones" (with Jhay Cortez, Ozuna featuring Los Legendarios)	2021	—	22	1	—	—	—	68	—	—	—	—	RIAA: Platinum (Latin)	TBA
"Buenos Días" (with Camilo, Los Legendarios)	2022	—	—	—	22	—	26	32	—	21	—	—		TBA
"—" denotes a title that did not chart, or was not released in that territory.

=== Featured singles ===
List of featured singles with selected chart positions, showing year released and album name
Title	Year	Peak chart positions											Certifications	Album
Title	Year	US Hot 100	US Latin	US Latin Rhythm	US Latin Pop	US Latin Tropical	MEX	SPA	VEN	COL	FRA	SWI	Certifications	Album
"Desde el Primer Beso" (Gocho featuring Wisin)	2013	—	35	23	18	11	—	—	—	—	—	—		Non-album single
"Fiesta in San Juan" (Assia Ahhatt featuring Wisin)	2014	—	—	—	—	25	—	—	—	—	—	—		Non-album single
"Muévelo" (Sofia Reyes featuring Wisin)	2014	—	25	40	18	—	18	13	—	—	—	—	RIAA: Platinum (Latin); PROMUSICAE: Gold	Louder
"Me Marcharé" (Los Cadillac's featuring Wisin)	2015	—	44	23	15	8	—	—	3	—	—	—		Non-album single
"Mayor Que Yo 3" (Luny Tunes featuring Don Omar, Wisin, Daddy Yankee, and Yandel)	2015	—	20	20	20	16	—	15	-	—	—	—	PROMUSICAE: 2× Platinum	Non-album single
"Dale Frontu" (Eloy featuring Wisin)	2015	—	—	19	2	—	—	—	—	—	—	—		Non-album single
"Baddest Girl in Town" (Pitbull featuring Mohombi and Wisin)	2015	—	47	8	11	—	—	36	—	—	—	—		Dale
"Rumba" (Anahí featuring Wisin)	2015	—	—	23	32	1	34	—	15	—	—	—		Inesperado
"Duele el Corazón" (Enrique Iglesias featuring Wisin)	2016	82	1	1	1	9	1	1	—	3	3	1	RIAA: 12× Platinum (Latin); AMPROFON: Diamond+Platinum; PROMUSICAE: 6× Platinum; IFPI AUT: Gold; SNEP: Diamond; BVMI: Gold; FIMI: 6× Platinum; GLF: 3× Platinum	Final
"Si Una Vez (If I Once)" (Play-N-Skillz featuring Wisin, Leslie Grace and Frankie J)	2016	111	22	34	15	—	—	—	—	—	—	—	RIAA: 4× Platinum (Latin)	Non-album single
"Sin Contrato" (Maluma featuring Don Omar and Wisin)	2016	—	7	1	2	8	6	52	—	3	—	—	AMPROFON: 4× Platinum; PROMUSICAE: Platinum	Pretty Boy, Dirty Boy
"Tan Facil" (CNCO featuring Wisin)	2016	—	5	—	—	—	41	76	—	—	—	—	RIAA: 3× Platinum (Latin); AMPROFON: Gold; PROMUSICAE: Gold	Primera Cita
"Sola (Remix)" (Anuel AA featuring Farruko, Zion & Lennox, Wisin, and Daddy Yankee)	2016	—	34	—	—	—	—	15	—	—	—	—	PROMUSICAE: 3× Platinum; RIAA: 7× Platinum (Latin)	Non-album single
"Quédate Conmigo" (Chyno Miranda featuring Wisin & Gente de Zona)	2017	—	25	7	10	2	—	91	—	—	—	—		Non-album single
"Alguien Robó" (Sebastián Yatra featuring Wisin and Nacho)	2017	—	31	34	25	—	24	22	—	2	—	—	RIAA: 2× Platinum (Latin); AMPROFON: 2× Platinum; PROMUSICAE: Platinum; CAPIF: Gold	Extended Play Yatra and Mantra
"Que Me Has Hecho" (Chayanne featuring Wisin)	2017	—	25	10	7	19	17	83	—	—	—	—	RIAA: Platinum (Latin)	Non-album single
"Como Antes" (Yandel featuring Wisin)	2017	116	7	1	4	—	46	62	18	48	—	—	RIAA: 7× Platinum (Latin); PROMUSICAE: Gold	Update
"Si Tú la Ves" (Nicky Jam featuring Wisin)	2017	—	18	17	9	—	—	50	—	9	—	—	AMPROFON: 3× Platinum+Gold; PROMUSICAE: Platinum; FIMI: Gold	Fénix
"Amor, Amor, Amor" (Jennifer Lopez featuring Wisin)	2017	119	10	1	7	—	—	7	—	—	—	—	AMPROFON: Gold	Non-album single
"Andan Por Ahí" (Revol featuring Arcángel, Nicky Jam, Ozuna, Bad Bunny, Farruko, Wisin, Cosculluela, Ñengo Flow and Alexio)	2017	—	—	—	—	—	—	—	—	—	—	—		Non-album single
"Bonita (Remix)" (J Balvin, Jowell & Randy featuring Nicky Jam, Wisin, Yandel, Ozuna)	2017	105	8	7	8	—	1	8	—	5	—	—	FIMI: Platinum; PROMUSICAE: 3× Platinum	Non-album single
"Solita" (with DJ Luian and Mambo Kingz featuring Bad Bunny, Almighty, Ozuna and Wisin)	2018	—	20	—	—	—	—	20	—	—	—	—	RIAA: 38× Platinum (Latin); FIMI: Gold; PROMUSICAE: Gold	
"Me Niego" (Reik featuring Wisin and Ozuna)	2018	77	6	1	1	—	1	2	20	1	—	63	RIAA: 21× Platinum (Latin); AMPROFON: Diamond+4× Platinum+Gold; PROMUSICAE: 3× Platinum; FIMI: Platinum	Ahora
"No Te Vas" (Nacho with Wisin and Noriel)	2018	—	—	—	—	—	—	75	2	—	—	—		La Criatura and UNO
"Todo El Amor" (De La Ghetto featuring Maluma and Wisin)	2018	—	46	30	22	—	—	—	—	47	—	—		Mi Movimiento
"Si Pudiera" (Christian Daniel featuring Wisin)	2018	—	—	24	17	—	—	—	—	—	—	—		Non-album single
"Deseo" (Kevin Roldán with Wisin)	2019	—	—	—	—	—	—	—	—	—	—	—		KrING
"Comerte a Besos" (Justin Quiles, Nicky Jam and Wisin)	2019	—	—	—	—	—	—	—	—	—	—	—		Realidad
"Quizás" (Rich Music, Sech and Dalex featuring Justin Quiles, Lenny Tavárez, Feid, Wisin and Zion)	2019	—	41	—	—	—	—	15	—	—	—	—	RIAA: Platinum (Latin); PROMUSICAE: Platinum	The Academy
"Música" (DJ Luian, Mambo Kingz and Farruko featuring Myke Towers, Darell, Arcángel and Wisin)	2019	—	—	—	—	—	—	—	—	—	—	—		Non-album single
"Impaciente (remix)" (Chencho Corleone and Miky Woodz featuring Wisin, Natti Natasha, Justin Quiles)	2019	—	—	—	—	—	—	—	—	—	—	—		Non-album single
"Por Contarle los Secretos" (Jon Z, Wisin and Chencho Corleone)	2019	—	—	—	—	—	—	—	—	—	—	—		Non-album single
"En Cero (Remix)" (Yandel, Sebastián Yatra, Manuel Turizo featuring Wisin, Farruko)	2019	—	—	27	17	—	—	70	—	—	—	—		Non-album single
"Borracho" (Brytiago featuring Wisin)	2020	—	—	44	—	—	—	—	—	—	—	—	RIAA: Gold (Latin)	Orgánico
"Provocame" (Miky Woodz with Wisin)	2020	—	—	—	—	—	—	—	—	—	—	—		Los 90 Piketes
"Más de Ti" (Gotay el Autentiko featuring Wisin, Ozuna)	2020	—	—	—	—	—	—	—	—	—	—	—		Non-album single
"Travesuras (remix)" (Nio García, Casper Mágico, Ozuna, Myke Towers, Wisin, Yandel, Flow La Movie)	2021	—	9	1	—	1	—	1	—	—	—	—	RIAA: Platinum (Latin); PROMUSICAE: Gold	Non-album single
"No Te Veo (Remix)" (Pacho El Antifeka, Jay Wheeler, Wisin & Yandel)	2021	—	—	—	—	—	—	—	—	—	—	—		Non-album single
"Amé" (Jumbo, Lyanno, featuring Zion)	2021	—	—	—	—	—	—	—	—	—	—	—		Non-album single
"El Tracatra" (With LAS VILLA, KEVVO)	2021	—	—	—	—	—	—	—	—	—	—	—		El Tracatra (EP)
"—" denotes a title that did not chart, or was not released in that territory.

=== Promotional singles and other charted songs ===
List of promotional singles and other charted songs with selected chart positions, showing year released and album name
Title	Year	Peak chart positions						Certifications	Album
Title	Year	US Latin Rhythm	MEX	US Latin	US Latin Pop	US Latin Tropical	SPA	Certifications	Album
"Si Te Digo la Verdad" (Official Remix) (Gocho featuring Wisin)	2012	–	–	–	–	–	–		Non-album single
"Tu Olor" (Official Remix) (Tito El Bambino featuring Wisin)	2013	–	–	–	–	–	–		Invicto
"Sistema" (featuring Jory)	2013	–	–	–	–	–	–		Non-album singles
"La Copa de Todos" (David Correy featuring Wisin and Paty Cantú)	2014	–	14	4	–	–	–		Non-album singles
"Claro" (featuring Jory)	2014	20	–	–	–	–	–		El Regreso del Sobreviviente
"Heavy Heavy" (featuring Tempo)	2014	24	–	–	–	–	–		El Regreso del Sobreviviente
"Creo en Mi" (Natalia Jiménez featuring Wisin)	2014	–	–	–	–	–	–		Creo en Mi
"Ricos y Famosos" (Tito El Bambino feat. Ñengo Flow and Wisin)	2014	25	–	–	–	–	–		Alta Jerarquía
"Nena Mala" (Tito El Bambino featuring Wisin)	2014	20	–	–	–	–	–		Non-album single
"Yo Quiero Contigo"	2014	–	–	–	–	–	–		Los Vaqueros 3: La Trilogía
"Si Lo Hacemos Bien"	2015	1	–	12	7	7	–		Latin Vibes (various artists)
"Piquete"	2015	–	–	–	–	–	–		Los Vaqueros 3: La Trilogía
"Poder"	2015	–	–	–	–	–	92		Los Vaqueros 3: La Trilogía
"Corazón acelerado"	2015	10	–	20	15	–	74		Los Vaqueros 3: La Trilogía
"Gozadera (Sol, Playa y Arena)" (Luny Tunes featuring Don Omar, Wisin, El Potro Alvarez, and Yandel)	2016	–	–	–	–	13	–		Non-album singles
"Desde El Dia Que Te Fuiste (ChocQuibTown feat. Wisin)	2016	–	–	–	29	1	–		Non-album singles
"Al Filo de Tu Amor (Remix)" (Carlos Vives feat. Wisin)	2017	–	32	18	–	–	63		Vives
"Así Es El Amor" (Olga Tañón feat. Wisin)	2017	–	–	–	23	6	–		Olga Tañón y Punto
"La realidad (Remix)" (Noriel feat. Ozuna and Wisin)	2017	–	–	–	–	–	–		Non-album singles
"No Hay Dinero (ChocQuibTown featuring Wisin)	2017	–	–	–	–	–	–		Non-album singles
"Amor (IAmChino feat. Wisin)	2017	–	–	–	37	–	–		Non-album singles
"Iguales" (Diego Torres featuring Lali and Wisin)	2018	–	–	–	–	–	–		Non-album singles
"Pa' Morir Se Nace (Remix)" (Pacho El Antifeka, Farruko, Cosculluela featuring Juanka and Wisin)	2020	–	–	–	–	–	–		Non-album singles
"Sexy Sensual" (Tito El Bambino, Wisin, Zion & Lennox featuring Cosculluela)	2020	–	–	–	–	–	–		Non-album singles
"Es Que Tu" (Chris Andrew, Rauw Alejandro, Wisin)	2021	–	–	–	–	–	–		Los Legendarios 001
"En Mi Habitación" (with Lunay and Rauw Alejandro featuring Los Legendarios)	2021	–	–	–	–	–	–	RIAA: Gold (Latin)	Los Legendarios 001
"La Mamá de la Mamá" (El Alfa, Busta Rhymes, Anitta, CJ, Wisin, Cherry)	2021	–	–	–	–	–	–		Non-album single
"Mi Exxx" (Anuel AA)	2023	–	–	40	–	–	57	RIAA: 2× Platinum (Latin)	Mr. W

== Album appearances ==
The following songs are not singles or promotional singles and have not appeared on an album by Wisin.

Title	Year	Album
"Jinete" (Alexis & Fido feat. Wisin)	2006	Los Reyes del Perreo
"Pa' Darle" (Tony Dize feat. Wisin)	2008	La Melodía de la Calle
"Pa' Lo Oscuro" (Franco "El Gorila" feat. Wisin)	2009	Welcome to the Jungle
"Me Estoy Muriendo" (Franco "El Gorila" feat. Wisin)	2009	Welcome to the Jungle
"Ella Me Llama Tarde" (Tony Dize feat. Wisin)	2009	La Melodía De La Calle: Updated
"Suave y Lento" (Jowell & Randy feat. Franco "El Gorila" and Wisin)	2010	El Momento
"Que No Muera la Esperanza" (Live Version) (Franco De Vita feat. Wisin)	2013	Franco De Vita Vuelve: En Primera Fila
"Solo Verte" (Remix) (Cosculluela feat. Divino and Wisin)	2014	Santa Cos
"Ricos y Famosos" (Tito El Bambino feat. Ñengo Flow and Wisin)	2014	Alta Jerarquía
"Dobla Rodilla" (Don Omar feat. Wisin)	2015	The Last Don 2
"Tú Me Enloqueces" (Baby Rasta & Gringo feat. Wisin)	2015	Los cotizados
"Decidete" (Arcángel feat. Wisin)	2015	Los Favoritos
"No Tengo Dinero" (Juan Gabriel feat. Wisin)	2015	Los Dúo, Vol. 2
"La Movie" (Gadiel feat. Wisin)	2016	Alto Rango
"Le Gusta Malo" (Andino feat. Maldy and Wisin)	2017	El Protagonista
"Pensando En Ti" (Anuel AA feat. Wisin)	2018	Real Hasta la Muerte
"Doble Play" (Nacho feat. Wisin & Luis Fonsi)	2019	UNO
"Moviéndolo" (Pitbull feat. Wisin & Yandel)	2019	Libertad 548
"Emilio y Gloria" (Arcángel feat. Wisin & Yandel)	2020	Los Favoritos 2
"No Te Creo" (Rauw Alejandro with Wisin & Yandel and Mr. NaisGai)	2020	Afrodisíaco
Alex Zurdo RECUERDOS Y SONRISAS Ft wisin	2025	Mayday

== Music videos ==
List of music videos, showing year released and directors
Title	Year	Artist(s)	Director(s)
As lead artist
"La Gitana"	2004	Wisin	Louis Martínez
"Saoco"	2004	Wisin featuring Daddy Yankee	Louis Martínez
"Sistema"	2013	Wisin featuring Jory	Fernando Lugo
"Que Viva la Vida"	2013	Wisin	Jessy Terrero
"La Copa de Todos"	2013	David Correy, Wisin and Paty Cantú	Jessy Terrero
"Adrenalina"	2014	Wisin featuring Jennifer Lopez and Ricky Martin	Jessy Terrero
"Control"	2014	Wisin featuring Pitbull	Carlos Pérez
"Nota De Amor"	2015	Wisin with Carlos Vives featuring Daddy Yankee	Jessy Terrero
"Que Se Sienta El Deseo"	2015	Wisin featuring Ricky Martin	Jessy Terrero
"Tu Libertad"	2015	Wisin and Prince Royce	Jessy Terrero
"Vacaciones"	2016	Wisin	Jessy Terrero
"Escápate Conmigo"	2017	Wisin featuring Ozuna	Jessy Terrero
"Dulce"	2017	Wisin With Leslie Grace	
"Move Your Body"	2017	Wisin featuring Timbaland and Bad Bunny	Jessy Terrero
"Todo Comienza En La Disco"	2018	Wisin featuring Yandel and Daddy Yankee	Jessy Terrero
"Quisiera Alejarme"	2018	Wisin featuring Ozuna	Mike Ho
As featured artist
Title	Year	Artist(s)	Director(s)
"Desde El Primer Beso"	2013	Gocho featuring Wisin	DYAD
"Fiesta in San Juan"	2014	Assia Ahhatt featuring Wisin	Jessy Terrero
"Muévelo"	2014	Sofia Reyes featuring Wisin	Steve Gomillion and Dennis Leupold
"Me Marcharé"	2015	Los Cadillac's featuring Wisin	Daniel Durán and Jessy Terrero
"Dale Frontu"	2015	Eloy featuring Wisin	Christian Suau
"Rumba"	2015	Anahí featuring Wisin	Jessy Terrero
"Baddest Girl in Town"	2015	Pitbull featuring Mohombi and Wisin	
"Duele el Corazón"	2016	Enrique Iglesias featuring Wisin	Jessy Terrero
"Si Una Vez (If I Once)"	2016	Play-N-Skillz featuring Wisin, Leslie Grace and Frankie J	
"Quedate Conmigo"	2017	Chyno Miranda featuring Wisin & Gente de Zona	Jessy Terrero
"Alguien Robó"	2017	Sebastián Yatra featuring Wisin and Nacho	
"Que Me Has Hecho"	2017	Chayanne featuring Wisin	Jessy Terrero
"Como Antes"	2017	Yandel featuring Wisin	Jessy Terrero
"Si Tú la Ves"	2017	Nicky Jam featuring Wisin	Jessy Terrero
"Amor, Amor, Amor"	2017	Jennifer Lopez featuring Wisin	Jessy Terrero
"Solita"	2018	with DJ Luian and Mambo Kingz featuring Almighty, Ozuna and Wisin	
"Me Niego"	2018	Reik featuring Wisin and Ozuna	

== See also ==
- Wisin & Yandel discography
- Wisin & Yandel videography
