= List of Billboard Latin Rhythm Airplay number ones of 2015 =

The Billboard Latin Rhythm Airplay is a chart that ranks the best-performing Spanish-language Latin rhythm singles in the United States. Published by Billboard magazine, the data is compiled by Nielsen SoundScan based collectively on each single's weekly airplay.

== Chart history ==
Key
†	Indicates number 1 on Billboard's year-end Latin rhythm chart

Issue date	Song	Artist	Ref
January 3	"Ay Vamos"	J Balvin	
January 10	"Ay Vamos"	J Balvin	
January 17	"Ay Vamos"	J Balvin	
January 24	"Ay Vamos"	J Balvin	
January 31	"Ay Vamos"	J Balvin	
February 7	"Ay Vamos"	J Balvin	
February 14	"Soledad"	Don Omar	
February 21	"Piensas (Dile la Verdad)"	Pitbull featuring Gente de Zona	
February 28	"Piensas (Dile la Verdad)"	Pitbull featuring Gente de Zona	
March 7	"Piensas (Dile la Verdad)"	Pitbull featuring Gente de Zona	
March 14	"Piensas (Dile la Verdad)"	Pitbull featuring Gente de Zona	
March 21	"Piensas (Dile la Verdad)"	Pitbull featuring Gente de Zona	
March 28	"El Perdón" †	Nicky Jam and Enrique Iglesias	
April 4	"El Perdón" †	Nicky Jam and Enrique Iglesias	
April 11	"El Perdón" †	Nicky Jam and Enrique Iglesias	
April 18	"El Perdón" †	Nicky Jam and Enrique Iglesias	
April 25	"Nota de Amor"	Wisin and Carlos Vives featuring Daddy Yankee	
May 4	"El Perdón" †	Nicky Jam and Enrique Iglesias	
May 9	"El Perdón" †	Nicky Jam and Enrique Iglesias	
May 16	"El Perdón" †	Nicky Jam and Enrique Iglesias	
May 23	"Sígueme y Te Sigo"	Daddy Yankee	
May 30	"El Perdón" †	Nicky Jam and Enrique Iglesias	
June 6	"El Perdón" †	Nicky Jam and Enrique Iglesias	
June 13	"El Perdón" †	Nicky Jam and Enrique Iglesias	
June 20	"El Perdón" †	Nicky Jam and Enrique Iglesias	
June 27	"El Perdón" †	Nicky Jam and Enrique Iglesias	
July 4	"El Perdón" †	Nicky Jam and Enrique Iglesias	
July 11	"El Perdón" †	Nicky Jam and Enrique Iglesias	
July 18	"El Perdón" †	Nicky Jam and Enrique Iglesias	
July 25	"El Perdón" †	Nicky Jam and Enrique Iglesias	
August 1	"El Perdón" †	Nicky Jam and Enrique Iglesias	
August 8	"El Perdón" †	Nicky Jam and Enrique Iglesias	
August 15	"Calentura"	Yandel	
August 22	"El Perdón" †	Nicky Jam and Enrique Iglesias	
August 29	"La Gozadera"	Gente de Zona featuring Marc Anthony	
September 5	"El Perdón" †	Nicky Jam and Enrique Iglesias	
September 12	"Si Lo Hacemos Bien"	Wisin	
September 19	"Ginza"	J Balvin	
September 26	"Ginza"	J Balvin	
October 3	"Ginza"	J Balvin	
October 10	"Ginza"	J Balvin	
October 17	"Ginza"	J Balvin	
October 24	"Ginza"	J Balvin	
October 31	"Ginza"	J Balvin	
November 7	"Sunset"	Farruko featuring Shaggy and Nicky Jam	
November 14	"Ginza"	J Balvin	
November 21	"Borró Cassette"	Maluma	
November 28	"Borró Cassette"	Maluma	
December 5	"Borró Cassette"	Maluma	
December 12	"Borró Cassette"	Maluma	
December 19	"Ginza"	J Balvin	
December 26	"Ginza"	J Balvin	
