= List of Billboard Latin Rhythm Airplay number ones of 2018 =

The Billboard Latin Pop Airplay is a chart that ranks the best-performing Spanish-language Pop music singles of the United States. Published by Billboard magazine, the data are compiled by Nielsen SoundScan based collectively on each single's weekly airplay.

== Chart history ==
Key
†	Indicates number 1 on Billboard's year-end Latin rhythm chart

Issue date	Song	Artist	Ref
January 6	"Perro Fiel"	Shakira featuring Nicky Jam	
January 13	"Perro Fiel"	Shakira featuring Nicky Jam	
January 20	"Perro Fiel"	Shakira featuring Nicky Jam	
January 27	"Corazón"	Maluma featuring Nego do Borel	
February 3	"Mayores"	Becky G and Bad Bunny	
February 10	"Corazón"	Maluma featuring Nego do Borel	
February 17	"Mayores"	Becky G and Bad Bunny	
February 24	"Cásate Conmigo"	Silvestre Dangond and Nicky Jam	
March 3	"La Modelo"	Ozuna featuring Cardi B	
March 10	"Todo Comienza en la Disco"	Wisin featuring Yandel and Daddy Yankee	
March 17	"Dura"	Daddy Yankee	
March 24	"Machika"	J Balvin, Jeon and Anitta	
March 31	"El Baño"	Enrique Iglesias featuring Bad Bunny	
April 7	"Dura"	Daddy Yankee	
April 14	"Dura"	Daddy Yankee	
April 21	"Dura"	Daddy Yankee	
April 28	"X" †	Nicky Jam and J Balvin	
May 5	"Dura"	Daddy Yankee	
May 12	"X" †	Nicky Jam and J Balvin	
May 19	"Fiebre"	Ricky Martin featuring Wisin & Yandel	
May 26	"Me Niego"	Reik featuring Ozuna & Wisin	
June 2	"El Préstamo"	Maluma	
June 9	"El Préstamo"	Maluma	
June 16	"Se Acabó el Amor"	Abraham Mateo, Yandel and Jennifer Lopez	
June 23	"Me Niego"	Reik featuring Ozuna & Wisin	
June 30	"La Player (Bandolera)"	Zion & Lennox	
July 7	"Ambiente"	J Balvin	
July 14	"El Anillo"	Jennifer Lopez	
July 21	"X" †	Nicky Jam and J Balvin	
July 28	"Unica"	Ozuna	
August 4	"Unica"	Ozuna	
August 11	"Sin Pijama"	Becky G and Natti Natasha	
August 18	"Quisiera Alejarme"	Wisin featuring Ozuna	
August 25	"Mi Cama"	Karol G and J Balvin featuring Nicky Jam	
September 1	"El Clavo"	Prince Royce featuring Maluma	
September 8	"X" †	Nicky Jam and J Balvin	
September 15	"Calypso"	Luis Fonsi and Stefflon Don or Karol G	
September 22	"X" †	Nicky Jam and J Balvin	
September 29	"Clandestino"	Shakira and Maluma	
October 6	"Vaina Loca"	Ozuna and Manuel Turizo	
October 13	"Vaina Loca"	Ozuna and Manuel Turizo	
October 20	"Vaina Loca"	Ozuna and Manuel Turizo	
October 27	"Se Vuelve Loca"	CNCO	
November 3	"Justicia"	Silvestre Dangond and Natti Natasha	
November 10	"Mala Mia"	Maluma	
November 17	"Zum Zum"	Daddy Yankee, R.K.M & Ken-Y and Arcángel	
November 24	"No Es Justo"	J Balvin and Zion & Lennox	
December 1	"Taki Taki"	DJ Snake featuring Selena Gomez, Ozuna and Cardi B	
December 8	"Taki Taki"	DJ Snake featuring Selena Gomez, Ozuna and Cardi B	
December 15	"Ya No Tiene Novio"	Sebastian Yatra + Mau y Ricky	
December 22	"Hola"	Zion & Lennox	
December 29	"Mia"	Bad Bunny featuring Drake	
