= Lo Nuestro Award for Collaboration of the Year =

American annual award for Latin music

- Current: Premio Lo Nuestro 2017
- Awarded for: A musical collaboration between two or more performers in a song
- Country: United States
- Presented by: Univision
- First award: 2010

Highlights
- Most awards: Enrique Iglesias (5)
- Website: univision.com/premiolonuestro

The Lo Nuestro Award for Collaboration of the Year is an honor presented annually by American network Univision. The Lo Nuestro Awards were first awarded in 1989 and were established to recognize the most talented performers of Latin music. The nominees and winners were originally selected by a voting poll conducted among program directors of Spanish-language radio stations in the United States and also based on chart performance on Billboard Latin music charts, with the results being tabulated and certified by the accounting firm Deloitte. At the present time, the winners are selected by the audience through an online survey. The trophy awarded is shaped in the form of a treble clef.

In 2010, the Collaboration of the Year (an all-genre award) was included in the General Field of the Lo Nuestro Awards, and in the first time that was presented the nominees included "Aquí Estoy Yo" by Puerto-Rican American pop singer Luis Fonsi featuring Aleks Syntek, David Bisbal and Noel Schajris; "All Up 2 You" by American bachata band Aventura featuring Akon and Wisin y Yandel; "Eso de Quererte" by Mexican banda performer Fidel Rueda and Los Buitres; "Imparable" by Puerto-Rican American singer-songwriter Tommy Torres and Jesse & Joy; and Puerto-Rican American urban band "No Hay Nadie Como Tú" by Calle 13 featuring Café Tacuba. "Aquí Estoy Yo" earned the award, and also was the recipient of the Latin Grammy Award for Song of the Year. The following year, Spanish singer-songwriter Enrique Iglesias won the category with "Cuando Me Enamoro", a collaboration with Dominican performer Juan Luis Guerra, and also received the Hot Latin Song of the Year accolade at the Billboard Latin Music Awards.

Puerto-Rican reggaeton performer Daddy Yankee won in 2012 for his collaboration with American singer Prince Royce titled "Ven Conmigo", which was also nominated for a Latin Grammy Award for Best Urban Song. In 2013, Prince Royce became the most awarded performer in the category, winning for the second consecutive year, since his collaboration with Mexican band Maná titled "El Verdadero Amor Perdona" won for collaboration of the year and also reached number-one in the Billboard Latin Songs chart.

In 2015, the Collaboration of the Year Award was separated into four fields: Pop, Tropical, Regional Mexican, and Urban. The following year it returned to the General Field and was awarded to Nicky Jam and Enrique Iglesias for "El Perdón" and in 2017 nominations were presented in the General and Urban Field.

== Winners and nominees ==
Listed below are the winners of the award for each year, as well as the other nominees.

Key	Meaning
‡	Indicates the winner

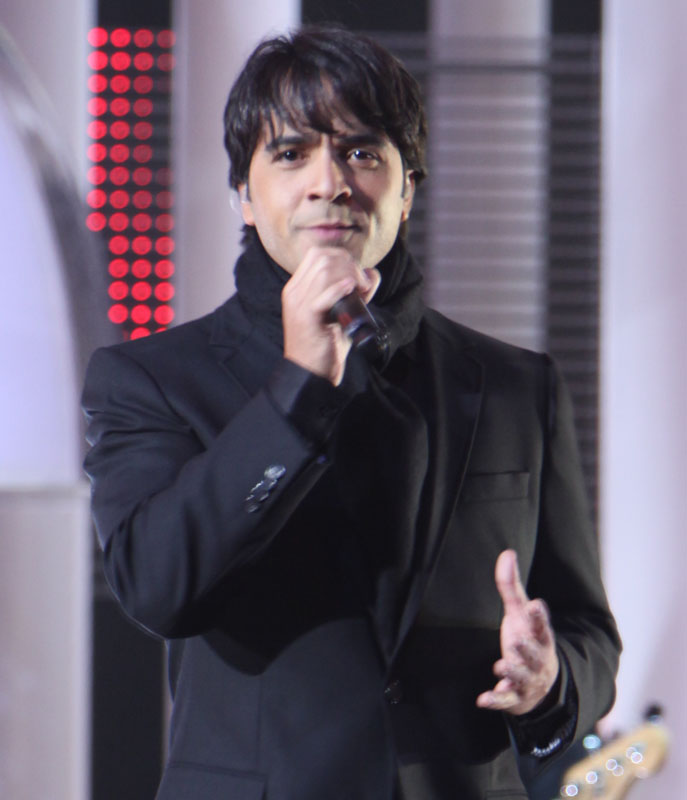
Puerto-Rican American singer Luis Fonsi, the inaugural winner of the category

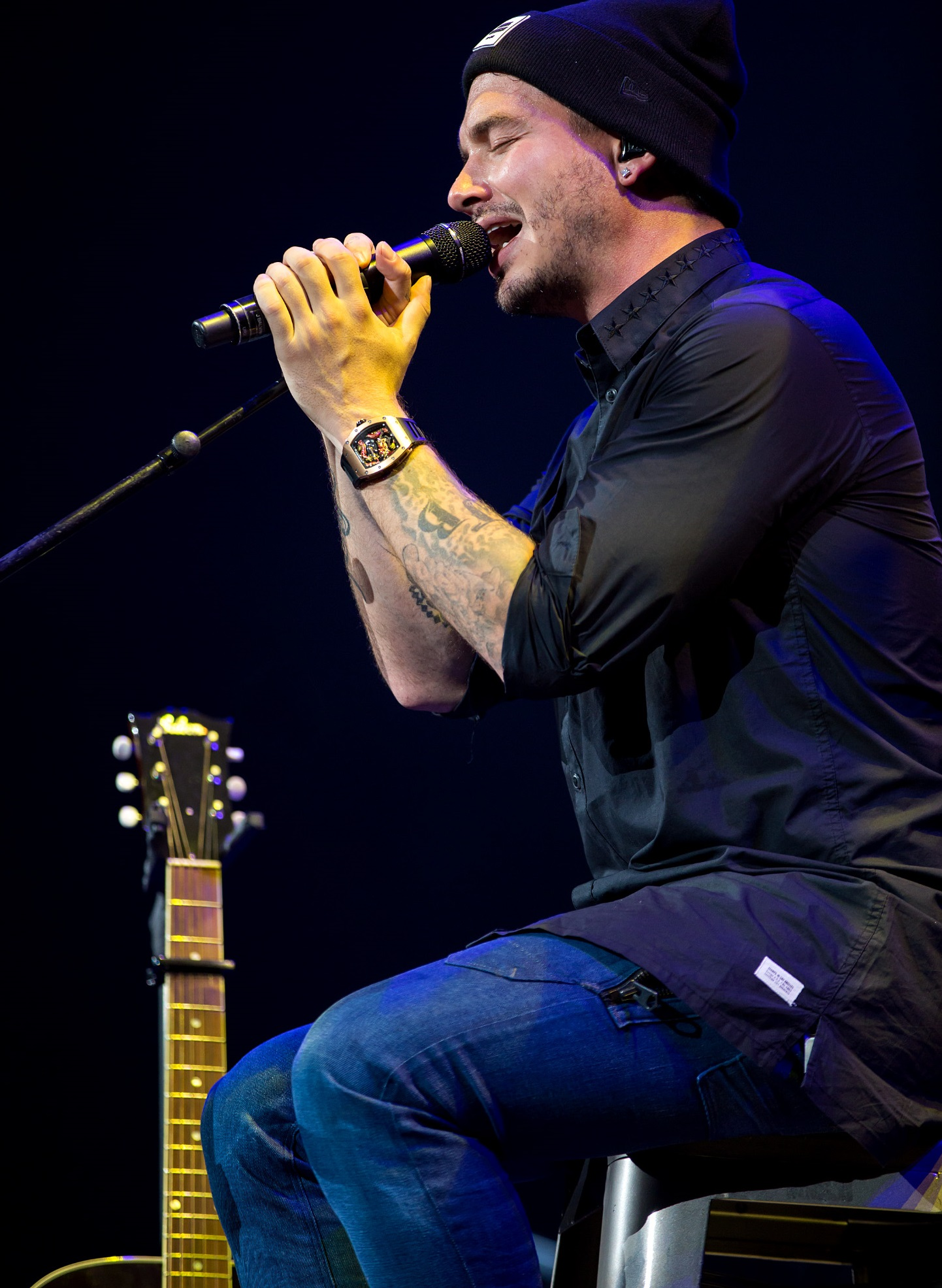
Colombian singer J Balvin winner in 2015

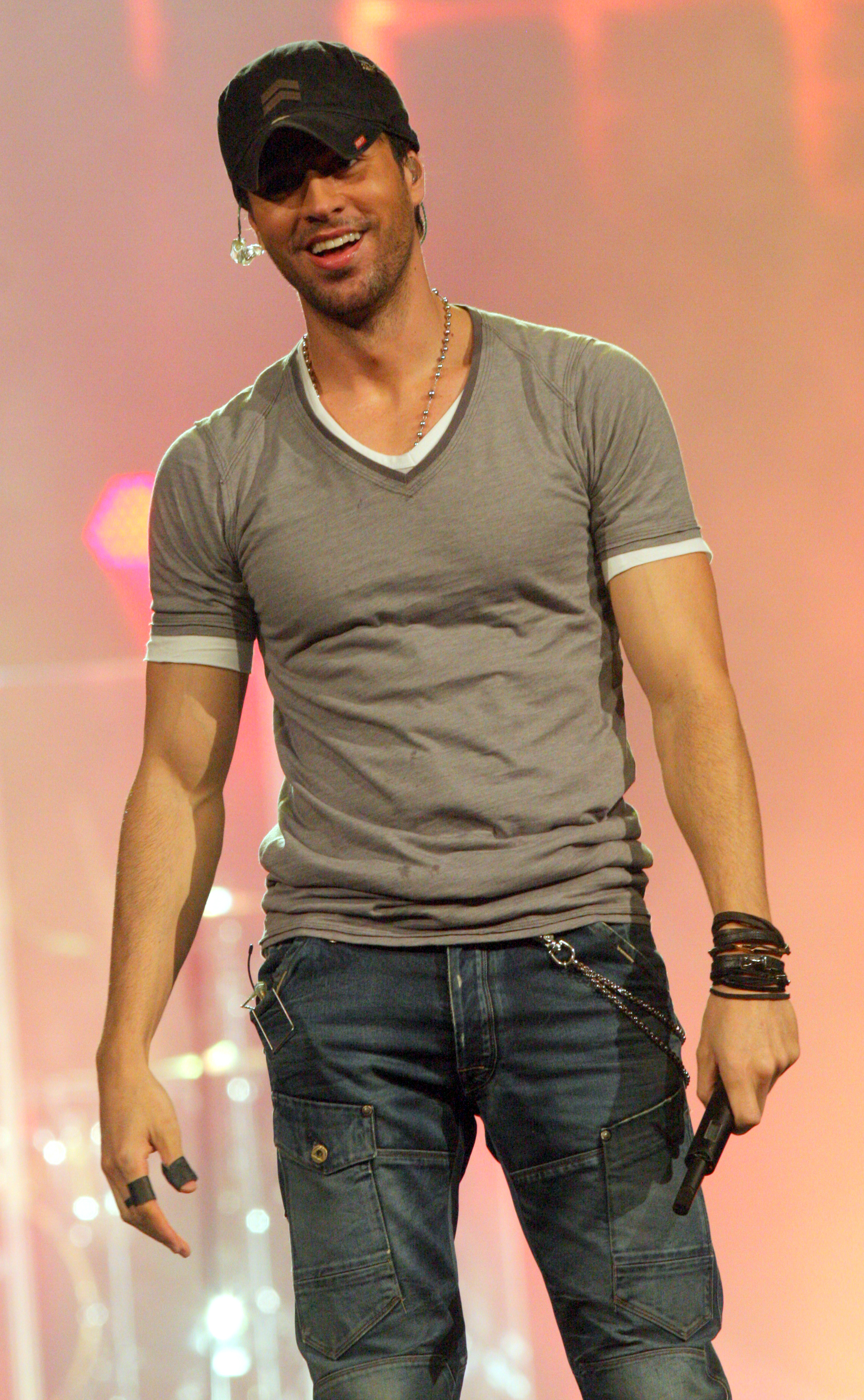
Spanish singer Enrique Iglesias (pictured in 2011), received 10 nominations for the 27th Lo Nuestro Awards including three for Collaboration of the Year for songs performed with Descemer Bueno, Gente de Zona, Marco Antonio Solís and Romeo Santos.

Year	Field	Song	Performer(s)	Ref
2010 (22nd)	General	"Aquí Estoy Yo"‡	Luis Fonsi featuring Aleks Syntek, David Bisbal and Noel Schajris	
2010 (22nd)	General	"All Up 2 You"	Aventura featuring Akon and Wisin y Yandel	
2010 (22nd)	General	"Eso de Quererte"	Fidel Rueda and Los Buitres	
2010 (22nd)	General	"Imparable"	Tommy Torres and Jesse & Joy	
2010 (22nd)	General	"No Hay Nadie Como Tú"	Calle 13 featuring Café Tacuba	
2011 (23rd)	General	"Cuando Me Enamoro"‡	Enrique Iglesias featuring Juan Luis Guerra	
2011 (23rd)	General	"Colgando En Tu Manos"	Carlos Baute featuring Marta Sánchez	
2011 (23rd)	General	"Gracias a Ti"	Wisin y Yandel featuring Enrique Iglesias	
2011 (23rd)	General	"Looking for Paradise"	Alejandro Sanz featuring Alicia Keys	
2011 (23rd)	General	"Mi Cama Huele a Ti"	Tito El Bambino featuring Zion y Lennox	
2012 (24th)	General	"Ven Conmigo"‡	Daddy Yankee featuring Prince Royce	
2012 (24th)	General	"Culiacán vs Mazatlán"	Calibre 50 and Gerardo Ortíz	
2012 (24th)	General	"Día de Suerte"	Alejandra Guzmán featuring Moderatto	
2012 (24th)	General	"Lo Mejor de Mi Vida Eres Tú"	Ricky Martin featuring Natalia Jiménez	
2012 (24th)	General	"Rabiosa"	Shakira featuring El Cata	
2013 (25th)	General	"El Verdadero Amor Perdona"‡	Maná featuring Prince Royce	
2013 (25th)	General	"Bailando Por El Mundo"	Juan Magan featuring Pitbull and El Cata	
2013 (25th)	General	"¡Corre!"	Jesse & Joy featuring La Republika	
2013 (25th)	General	"Dutty Love"	Don Omar featuring Natti Natasha	
2013 (25th)	General	"Mi Santa"	Romeo Santos featuring Tomatito	
2014 (26th)	General	"¿Por Qué Les Mientes?"‡	Tito El Bambino featuring Marc Anthony	
2014 (26th)	General	"Algo Me Gusta de Ti"	Wisin y Yandel featuring Chris Brown and T-Pain	
2014 (26th)	General	"Como Le Gusta a Tu Cuerpo"	Carlos Vives featuring Michel Teló	
2014 (26th)	General	"Gente Batallosa"	Calibre 50 featuring Banda Carnaval	
2014 (26th)	General	"Pegaíto Suavecito"	Elvis Crespo featuring Fito Blanko	
2015 (27th)	Pop	"Bailando"‡	Enrique Iglesias featuring Descemer Bueno and Gente de Zona	
2015 (27th)	Pop	"Dónde Está el Amor"	Pablo Alborán featuring Jesse & Joy	
2015 (27th)	Pop	"El Perdedor"	Enrique Iglesias and Marco Antonio Solís	
2015 (27th)	Pop	"La Noche es Tuya"	3Ball MTY featuring América Sierra and Gerardo Ortíz	
2015 (27th)	Pop	"Mi Peor Error"	Alejandra Guzmán featuring Yandel	
2015 (27th)	Tropical	"Loco"‡	Enrique Iglesias featuring Romeo Santos	
2015 (27th)	Tropical	"Cuando Nos Volvamos a Encontrar"	Carlos Vives featuring Marc Anthony	
2015 (27th)	Tropical	"Love & Party"	Joey Montana featuring Juan Magan	
2015 (27th)	Tropical	"Odio"	Romeo Santos featuring Drake	
2015 (27th)	Tropical	"Se Fue"	Laura Pausini featuring Marc Anthony	
2015 (27th)	Regional Mexican	"Te la Pasas"‡	Tito Torbellino featuring Espinoza Paz	
2015 (27th)	Regional Mexican	"Al Estilo Mafia"	Saúl El Jaguar featuring La Bandononona Clave Nueva De Max Peraza	
2015 (27th)	Regional Mexican	"El Bueno y el Malo"	Colmillo Norteño featuring Banda Tierra Sagrada	
2015 (27th)	Regional Mexican	"Entrega de Amor"	Los Ángeles Azules featuring Saúl Hernández	
2015 (27th)	Regional Mexican	"Fin de Semana"	La Original Banda El Limón de Salvador Lizárraga featurting Río Roma	
2015 (27th)	Urban	"6 AM"‡	J Balvin featuring Farruko	
2015 (27th)	Urban	"Adrenalina"	Wisin featuring Jennifer Lopez and Ricky Martin	
2015 (27th)	Urban	"La Temperatura"	Maluma featuring Eli Palacios	
2015 (27th)	Urban	"Moviendo Caderas"	Yandel featuring Daddy Yankee	
2015 (27th)	Urban	"Passion Whine"	Farruko featuring Sean Paul	
2016 (28th)	General	"El Perdón"‡	Nicky Jam featuring Enrique Iglesias	
2016 (28th)	General	"Debajo del Sombrero"	Leandro Ríos featuring Pancho Uresti	
2016 (28th)	General	"Mi Verdad"	Maná featuring Shakira	
2016 (28th)	General	"Yo También"	Romeo Santos featuring Marc Anthony	
2017 (29th)	General	"Duele el Corazón"	Enrique Iglesias featuring Wisin	
2017 (29th)	General	"Como lo Hacía Yo"	Ken-Y featuring Nicky Jam	
2017 (29th)	General	"Tomen Nota"	Adriel Favela featuring Los del Arroyo	
2017 (29th)	General	"Traidora"	Gente de Zona featuring Marc Anthony	
2017 (29th)	Urban	"Ay Mi Dios"	IamChino featuring Pitbull, Yandel and Chacal	
2017 (29th)	Urban	"Chillax"	Farruko featuring Ky-Mani Marley	
2017 (29th)	Urban	"Como lo Hacía Yo"	Ken-Y featuring Nicky Jam	
2017 (29th)	Urban	"Disfruta la Vida"	Antonio Baullo featuring J Álvarez and Flex	
2017 (29th)	Urban	"Mayor Que Yo 3"	Luny Tunes, Daddy Yankee, Wisin, Don Omar and Yandel	
2017 (29th)	Urban	"Not a Crime"	Play-N-Skillz and Daddy Yankee	
2017 (29th)	Urban	"Que Se Sienta el Deseo"	Wisin featuring Ricky Martin	

== See also ==
- Billboard Latin Music Awards
