= Saoco (Wisin song) =

Single by Wisin featuring Daddy Yankee

from the album El Sobreviviente
- Language: Spanish
- Released: 2004
- Genre: Reggaeton
- Length: 3:04
- Label: Líderes; Fresh
- Songwriters: Juan Luis Morera; Ramón Ayala Rodríguez; Urbani Mota
- Producers: DJ Urba; Fido

Music video
- "Saoco" on YouTube

"Saoco" is a song by Puerto Rican singer Wisin featuring fellow Puerto Rican singer Daddy Yankee. It was released in 2004 as the second single from Wisin's first solo studio album, El Sobreviviente (2004).

== Track listings ==
Digital, streaming (album version)
No.	Title	Length
4.	"Saoco"	3:04

Vinyl, 12", maxi-single
No.	Title	Length
1.	"Saoco" (full mix)	3:06
2.	"Saoco" (music only)	3:06
3.	"Saoco" (vocal only)	3:04

== Charts ==
Weekly chart performance for "Saoco"
Chart (2004–2005)	Peak position
US Tropical Airplay (Billboard)	38
