= Victory (Wisin album) =

Studio album by Wisin
- Released: December 1, 2017
- Recorded: 2016–2017
- Genre: Reggaeton; Latin trap; ballad; dance pop
- Length: 60:03
- Label: Sony Latin

Wisin chronology
Los Vaqueros: La Trilogía (2015)	Victory (2017)	Los Legendarios 001 (2021)

Singles from Victory
- 1. "Vacaciones" Released: September 30, 2016; 2. "Escápate Conmigo" Released: March 24, 2017; 3. "Todo Comienza En La Disco" Released: November 24, 2017

Victory is the fourth studio album by Puerto Rican reggaeton artist Wisin. Released under Sony Music Latin on December 1, 2017.

== Track listing ==
No.	Title	Writer(s)	Productor(es)	Length
1.	"Victory"	Juan Luis Morera Luna	Marc & Rafy "Los Legendarios"	1:25
2.	"Contra La Pared"	Juan Luis Morera Luna	Hyde "El Verdadero Químico", Marc & Rafy "Los Legendarios"	3:57
3.	"Esta Noche Lo Vamos A Hacer"	Juan Luis Morera Luna	Hyde "El Verdadero Químico", Motiff	4:00
4.	"Hacerte El Amor" (featuring Yandel, Nicky Jam)	Juan Luis Morera Luna	Los Legendarios	4:03
5.	"Muévelo"	Juan Luis Morera Luna	Hyde "El Verdadero Químico", Los Legendarios	3:19
6.	"Move Your Body" (featuring Timbaland, Bad Bunny)	Juan Luis Morera Luna · Timothy Zachery Mosley · Benito Antonio Martínez Ocasio	Hyde "El Verdadero Químico", Los Legendarios	3:38
7.	"Todo Comienza En La Disco" (featuring Yandel, Daddy Yankee)	Juan Luis Morera Luna	DJ Urba & Rome, Hyde "El Verdadero Químico", Mr. Earcandy, Gaby Music	4:28
8.	"Esta Vez" (featuring Don Omar)	Juan Luis Morera Luna	Jumbo "El Que Produce Solo", Gaby Music	3:52
9.	"Quisiera Alejarme" (featuring Ozuna)	Juan Luis Morera Luna & Juan Carlos Ozuna Rosado	Hyde "El Verdadero Químico", Marc & Rafy "Los Legendarios"	3:45
10.	"Vacaciones"	Juan Luis Morera Luna	Hyde "El Verdadero Químico", Marc & Rafy "Los Legendarios", Motiff	3:58
11.	"Prohibida" (featuring Zion & Lennox)	Juan Luis Morera Luna	Jumbo "El Que Produce Solo", Gaby Music	4:17
12.	"Entramos En Calor"	Juan Luis Morera Luna	Hyde "El Verdadero Químico", Marc & Rafy "Los Legendarios"	3:39
13.	"Escápate Conmigo" (featuring Ozuna)	Juan Luis Morera Luna & Juan Carlos Ozuna Rosado	Hyde "El Verdadero Químico", Marc & Rafy "Los Legendarios", Gaby Music	3:52
14.	"Amor Radioactivo" (featuring Mario Domm)	Juan Luis Morera Luna	Mario Domm	4:08
15.	"Vacaciones" (Remix) (featuring Don Omar, Zion & Lennox, Tito El Bambino)	Juan Luis Morera Luna, Juan Carlos Ozuna Rosado	Hyde "El Verdadero Químico", Marc & Rafy "Los Legendarios", Motiff	4:19
16.	"Escápate Conmigo" (Remix) (featuring Ozuna, Bad Bunny, De La Ghetto & Arcángel)	Juan Luis Morera Luna	Hyde "El Verdadero Químico", Marc & Rafy "Los Legendarios", Gaby Music	6:27

== Charts ==
Chart (2017)	Peak position
US Billboard 200	125
US Latin Rhythm Albums (Billboard)	2
US Top Current Album Sales (Billboard)	62
US Top Latin Albums (Billboard)	2

== Certifications ==
Region	Certification	Certified units/sales
Mexico (AMPROFON)	Gold	30,000^{‡}
^{‡} Sales+streaming figures based on certification alone.
