= Los Legendarios =

Puerto Rican reggaeton music producers

- Also known as: Marc & Jaycob (2008–2009); Los Tranz4Merz (2009-2013); Los Legendarios (2014-present)
- Origin: Puerto Rico
- Genres: Reggaeton, Hip hop
- Occupations: Musician, producers
- Years active: 2008-present
- Labels: Sony Music Latin; Life Crown Music
- Members: Marcos Alfonso Ramírez Carrasquillo; Víctor Rafael Torres Betancourt

Los Legendarios is a duo of reggaeton music producers, originally from Puerto Rico, made up of Marcos Ramírez (Marc Legendario) and Víctor R. Torres (Rafy Legendario). They made their debut as producers in 2008, under the name Marc & Jaycob, a name that, in 2009, would change to Los Tranz4Merz. Finally in 2014, they would change their name to Los Legendarios. They have worked for various artists, including Alex Zurdo, Ozuna, Wisin and Carlos Vives.

== Musical career ==
Both began their musical career as reggaeton singers in the Christian sphere. Victor made his debut in 2005, making an appearance on the album La Verdad by DJ Blaster, under the stage name Jaycob (as part of the Vladimir & Jaycob duo); while Marcos made his debut in 2007, appearing on the album The Elite by God's Crew Records and T-Tanic Music, under the stage name Marc (being part of Albert & Marc). For this latest album, the two groups would unite to make an introductory song "Mensajeros" (Messengers), where they met and began to collaborate on other projects.

In 2008, they begin their artistic career as music producers. Marc would produce, together with Mind Dwella, the song "Reventando bocinas" by Jaydan and Víctor would produce, also for Jaydan, the songs "Buscando" and "Una vez más". Víctor would start to leave the singing, while Marc prepared, together with Albert, the album Los Intocables, in addition to continuing to participate in other productions such as Los Violentos 2 and United Kingdom 2 by Manny Montes and Visión del Reino, by DJ Blaster.

Under the pseudonym "Los Tranz4Merz", they began working on various urban music albums outside the Christian sphere, with Linares El Elegido, Carnal, Stebani Cruz, Johnny Prez and Obie Bermúdez, while culminating projects by Christian artists, such as Alex Zurdo, Manny Montes, Samitto & Esabdiel and Jaydan.

In April 2014, they officially signed a contract with Wisin and La Base Music Group, for the production of the album Los Vaqueros 3: La Trilogía, as announced by their Twitter account. There they changed their name to Los Legendarios. From this album, the song "Nota de amor" emerged, which featured Carlos Vives and Daddy Yankee, while its production was carried out by Marc and Rafy.

Like Los Legendarios in 2016, they released two albums produced exclusively by them, called Los Legendarios presentan: Tranz4Mando el Universo, alluding to their old stage name and working with Christian artists, such as Indiomar and Triple Seven, also participating in the productions of Michael Pratts, Funky, Musiko, Ivan 2Filoz and Omy Alka.

In the album Victory (2017), they are partakers of the composition of the song "Escápate Conmigo", which was nominated for the Billboard Music Awards 2018 in the Top Latin Song category, a combination that was later repeated in the song "Quisiera alejarme" from the same album. Later, the duo would participate in the production of the song "Me niego" by the Mexican group Reik, with the voices of Ozuna and Wisin, song that received 5 Lo Nuestro Awards, Latin Pop Song from Year in the Billboard Latin Music Awards 2019 edition and the Diamond certification given by the Recording Industry Association of America (RIAA) of the United States. For that same album, Ahora, they worked on the song "Duele", this time with Wisin & Yandel.

In 2019, with the theme "Si me das tu amor" ("If you give me your love") by Carlos Vives and Wisin, they won the Collaboration of the Tropical Year award at the Lo Nuestro Awards. In the following years, they have produced songs that have been located on various Billboard charts with artists such as Chyno and Nacho, Bad Bunny, Timbaland, Olga Tañón, Angel y Khriz, CNCO, Diego Torres, Ricky Martin, Carlos Vives, Zion & Lennox and Carlos Arroyo.

In June 2020, Wisin released a video called "La Base Documental", where he states that they will be working on several new talent projects, including the Legendary album, which will include two new artists, Chris Andrew and Adbiel " AB ", in addition to Reik, Miky Woodz, Ozuna, Rauw Alejandro, Black Eyed Peas and Wisin himself. At the 2021 Billboard Latin Music Awards ceremony, they were nominated in two categories, ultimately achieving the award for Latin Rhythm Artist of the Year, Duo or Group.

== Discography ==
=== Studio albums ===
- Serie T7 (2015, Triple Seven)
- Pre-Nexus (2016, Indiomar)
- Los Legendarios 001 (2021, Wisin)
- Multimillo, Vol. 1 (2022, Wisin)

== Awards ==
- 2021: Latin Rhythm Artist of the Year, Duo or Group - Billboard Latin Music Awards
- 2021: YEAR-END CHARTS Top Latin Artists – Duo/Group - Third position
