= Adrenalina (Wisin song) =

2014 single by Wisin

Single by Wisin featuring Ricky Martin and Jennifer Lopez

from the album El Regreso del Sobreviviente
- Language: Spanish
- English title: "Adrenaline"
- Released: February 18, 2014
- Studio: Criteria Studios (Miami, FL)
- Genre: Latin dance
- Length: 3:55
- Label: Sony Latin
- Songwriters: Martin; Lopez; Juan Luis Morera; Carlos E. Ortiz; Luis Enrique Ortiz Rivera; José Torres
- Producer: Chris Jeday

Wisin singles chronology
"Claro" (2014)	"Adrenalina" (2014)	"Fiesta en San Juan" (2014)

Jennifer Lopez singles chronology
"Live It Up" (2013)	"Adrenalina" (2014)	"I Luh Ya Papi" (2014)

Ricky Martin singles chronology
"Come with Me" (2013)	"Adrenalina" (2014)	"Vida" (2014)

Music videos
- "Adrenalina" on YouTube; "Adrenalina" (Spanglish version) on YouTube

Alternative cover
- Cover artwork for Spanglish version

"Adrenalina" (transl. "Adrenaline") is a song recorded by Puerto Rican rapper Wisin, featuring Puerto Rican singer Ricky Martin and Puerto Rican - American singer Jennifer Lopez for the former's second studio album, El Regreso del Sobreviviente (2014). It was written by Martin, Lopez, Wisin, Chris Jeday, Luis Enrique Ortiz Rivera, and José "Gocho" Torres, while the production was handled by Jeday. The song was released for digital download by Sony Music Latin on February 18, 2014, as the second single from the album. A Spanish language Latin dance song with hip hop and pop rock influences, its lyrics are sensual.

"Adrenalina" received widely positive reviews from music critics, who complimented its danceable rhythm and noted its featured artists as two Latin icons. The song was nominated for Latin Rhythm Airplay Song of the Year at the 2015 Latin Billboard Music Awards, as well as both Urban Song of the Year and Collaboration of the Year at the 2015 Premio Lo Nuestro. It was commercially successful, reaching the top five in Mexico and Spain, and on the Billboard Hot Latin Songs chart in the United States. It also reached the summit of the Billboard Latin Airplay, Latin Rhythm Airplay, and Latin Digital Song Sales charts. The song has received several certifications, including platinum in Mexico and double platinum in Spain.

An accompanying music video, released on March 3, 2014, was directed by Jessy Terrero and filmed in Miami, Florida. The visual depicts Martin and Lopez dancing sensually together, street chases, the underground atmosphere, and a final clandestine party. It was nominated for Video of the Year at the Premio Lo Nuestro and has received over 870 million views on YouTube. To promote "Adrenalina", the singers performed it on several television programs and award shows, including 2014 Premios Juventud.

== Background and release ==
On October 30, 2012, Univision revealed that reggaeton duo Wisin & Yandel had recorded a song entitled "Adrenalina" along with Jennifer Lopez and Ricky Martin. The duo had previously collaborated with Martin on "Frío" (2011), and with Lopez on "Follow the Leader" (2012). Wisin explained that "Adrenalina" had originally been recorded for Lopez, but upon hearing the tones and the vibes, they decided to invite Martin: "We told him that it was an explosion of theme. The public needs to see people united, and rather for the music so that it does not die."

On January 26, 2014, Wisin shared the artwork for the single, announcing that the song would be released on February 17, 2014. Despite the previous announcements, Yandel of Wisin & Yandel had not participated in the song. In an interview with People en Español, Wisin talked about the collaboration:

I am honored and extremely grateful to have created this partnership between Jennifer, Ricky and myself. It is something very significant that is reaching a worldwide audience. The chemistry between us is magical and I know that people are going to get infected with that great energy, that Adrenaline, from the song.

On February 18, 2014, "Adrenalina" was released by Sony Music Latin for digital download as the second single from Wisin's second studio album, El Regreso del Sobreviviente (2014). The song was sent to international radio stations on February 24, 2014, and was released for streaming the following day. It became the Univision's 2014 World Cup song and was included as the third track on El Regreso del Sobreviviente, released March 18, 2014. A Spanglish version of the song was recorded under the same title by Martin featuring Lopez and Wisin; it was released for digital download and streaming by Sony Music Latin on February 25, 2014.

== Music and lyrics ==
"Adrenalina"
A 23-second sample of the chorus, which features an up-tempo melody.

Musically, "Adrenalina" is a Spanish language up-tempo Latin dance song, with elements of hip hop and pop rock. It was written by Martin, Lopez, Wisin, Chris Jeday, Luis Enrique Ortiz Rivera, and José "Gocho" Torres, with its production being handled by Jeday. Both original and Spanglish versions of the song run for a total of 3 minutes and 55 seconds. The sensual lyrics include "Es que tu cuerpo es pura adrenalina que por dentro me atrapa / Me tiene al borde de la locura" (It is that your body is pure adrenaline that traps me inside / It has me on the verge of madness).

== Critical reception ==
Upon release, "Adrenalina" was met with widely positive reviews from music critics. A writer of Radio Corazón labeled the track "a super combination" that raises "the adrenaline", describing it as "a song that is undoubtedly a hit and is one of the most talked about" tracks from El Regreso del Sobreviviente. Idolator's Mike Wass described it as "an infectious Latin-infused dance anthem" and Remezcla's Marcos Hassan called it an athem that is "impossible to resist". Velvet Music editorial team stated that the song made a lot of noise since it features "the two Latin giants" Lopez and Martin, who joined "the unknown" Wisin. An author of Primera Hora named Lopez and Martin "the most international and the most desired Puerto Rican couple of the moment", while a writer of El Periódico de Catalunya introduced them as "two icons of Latin music in the US". Noelia Bertol from Cadena Dial ranked "Adrenalina" as one of "Ricky Martin six collaborations that have us moving the skeleton" and labeled it "a real great song". In 2016, El Comercio critic named the song a "megahit".

=== Accolades ===
In 2022, Cadena Dial ranked "Adrenalina" among the "10 songs to motivate you to do sports". The song has received a number of awards and nominations. It was nominated for Latin Rhythm Airplay Song of the Year at the 2015 Latin Billboard Music Awards, but lost to "6 AM" by J Balvin featuring Farruko. The track was also nominated for both Urban Song of the Year and Collaboration of the Year at the 27th Premio Lo Nuestro.

Awards and nominations for "Adrenalina"
Organization	Year	Award	Result	Ref.
Latin Music Italian Awards	2014	Best Latin Collaboration of The Year	Nominated	
Latin Music Italian Awards	2014	My Favorite Lyrics	Nominated	
Premios Juventud	2014	Perfect Combination	Nominated	
Premios Tu Mundo	2014	Most Popular Song of the Year	Nominated	
ASCAP Latin Awards	2015	Pop Winning Song	Won	
Billboard Latin Music Awards	2015	Latin Rhythm Airplay Song of the Year	Nominated	
Premio Lo Nuestro	2015	Collaboration of the Year	Nominated	
Premio Lo Nuestro	2015	Urban Song of the Year	Nominated	
Premio Lo Nuestro	2015	Video of the Year	Nominated	
BMI Latin Awards	2016	Latin Publisher of the Year	Won	
BMI Latin Awards	2016	Award Winning Songs	Won	

== Commercial performance ==
"Adrenalina" became a big hit, following its release. The song debuted at number 12 on Billboard's Hot Latin Songs chart on March 15, 2014, becoming Wisin's 4th entry, Lopez's 12th, and Martin's 39th. The following week it climbed to its peak at number two, being held off the top spot by "Odio" (2014) by Romeo Santos featuring Drake, while giving Wisin his second, Lopez her fifth, and Martin his 22nd top 10 hit. "Adrenalina" spent a total of 26 weeks on the chart and marked Wisin's highest-charting and longest running single at the time, surpassing "Que Viva La Vida" (2013). It also ties "No Me Ames" (1999) and "Ven a Bailar" (2011) as Lopez's longest-charting hits in her career. "Adrenalina" spent 10 weeks atop the US Latin Rhythm Airplay chart and reached the summit of both the US Latin Digital Song Sales and Latin Airplay charts. On Latin Pop Airplay, it peaked at number two, being held off the top spot by "Odio". "Adrenalina" debuted and peaked at number 94 on the US Billboard Hot 100 on March 22, 2014, becoming Wisin's first entry, Lopez's 24th, and Martin's 16th. The song also debuted and peaked at number 17 on Billboard's Hot Rap Songs chart, becoming both Wisin and Martin's first entry, and Lopez's second.

In Spain, "Adrenalina" debuted at number 28 on March 2, 2014, and subsequently peaked at number three on the chart issue dated March 16, 2014. The song spent 52 weeks on the chart and was certified double platinum by the Productores de Música de España (PROMUSICAE), for track-equivalent sales of over 80,000 units in the country. In Mexico, the track peaked at number four and was certified platinum by the Asociación Mexicana de Productores de Fonogramas y Videogramas (AMPROFON), for sales of over 60,000 units.

== Music videos ==
A screenshot from the music video, depicting Martin, Lopez, and Wisin singing the song and dancing to it.

On February 10, 2014, Wisin and Martin shared photos of themselves along with Dominican director Jessy Terrero, Ed Coriano, and Henry Quintero on the set of filming "Adrenalina" music video. Martin and Lopez continued sharing photos and videos from the set on Instagram, which included sensual scenes depicting the two singers. In an interview with PopCrush, Lopez talked about recording the video:

It was great working on the song with them. We've known each other for years, and we've done other songs and videos together. Shooting the video was a lot of fun. The three of us in one place in a video together... you rarely get to do that with more than just you and one other artist. It's usually by yourself. It was great to have the three of us there. It felt really powerful.

The video, which was filmed in Miami, Florida and directed by Terrero, was released on March 3, 2014. It features Martin and Lopez dancing sensually together, while Martin seductively bit Lopez's ear in a scene. The same as Lopez's several other music videos, "Adrenalina" visual includes street chases, leather and the lack of clothing, the underground atmosphere, and a final clandestine party, while according to E! Online, Martin's appearance "gives it a different touch" and "triggers the sexual tension of the video". Idolator's Mike Wass described the two as "the most beautiful 40-somethings on earth", praising Martin's "pretty" look and Lopez's "famous" buttocks that "steal the show". As of April 2022, the video has received over 870 million views on YouTube. It was nominated for Video of the Year at the 27th Premio Lo Nuestro. A similar music video was also filmed for the Spanglish version and was uploaded to Martin's YouTube channel on March 11, 2014.

== Live performances and appearances in media ==
On March 29, 2014, Martin gave his first live performance of "Adrenalina" on the second season's finale of The Voice: Ahla Sawt. On July 17, 2014, the trio performed the song at the 11th Annual Premios Juventud. Later that year, Wisin performed the track at the 9th Annual Premios 40 Principales in December. At the 2015 iHeartRadio Fiesta Latina, Lopez brought out Wisin during her performance and sang the song with him. Wisin also performed the single along with his other hits during the 57th Viña del Mar International Song Festival on February 27, 2016. "Adrenalina" was included on the set lists for Martin's the Live in Mexico tour, the One World Tour, and the Ricky Martin en Concierto, with the guest appearance of Wisin in several dates. On December 1, 2018, Wisin & Yandel invited Martin as a guest to their Como Antes Tour and the three singers performed "Fiebre" and "Adrenalina" together at the José Miguel Agrelot Coliseum in San Juan, Puerto Rico. During the performance, Martin wore a black T-shirt with the flag of Puerto Rico drawn by his children, to raise funds for helping people and reconstructing houses, following Hurricane Maria. On February 24, 2019, Wisin & Yandel performed "Adrenalina" along with their other hits during the 60th Viña del Mar International Song Festival. In the same year, Wisin and his team performed a medley of "Aullando", "Me niego", "Escápate Conmigo", and "Adrenalina" on the first season of American singing competition television series La Voz.

"Adrenalina" has been used by several contestants on various dance competition television series. In 2015, on the tenth season of Argentine TV dance competition Bailando por un Sueño, Verónica Ojeda and Nicolás Scillama performed their Freestyle dance choreography with the song, while Bárbara Vélez and Ignacio Pérez Cortés danced to it as their Latin pop choreography. On the next season, Carla Conte and Marcos Beierbach danced to it, the following year. Meryl Davis and Maksim Chmerkovskiy danced to "Adrenalina" on the 18th season of the American dance competition series Dancing with the Stars in 2014. They received a score of 39 out of 40. Milo Manheim and Witney Carson danced to "Adrenalina" with Riker Lynch on the 27th season of Dancing with the Stars in 2018. Their choreography received acclaim from the judges, who gave them the score of 29 out of 30. Italian singer Mietta covered the track as "Farfalla" on the Italian singing competition television series Il cantante mascherato in 2020. The following year, Chilean singer Américo delivered a performance of the song on the Chilean television series ¿Quién es la máscara? as "Piña".

== Track listing ==
Digital download
No.	Title	Length
1.	"Adrenalina"	3:55
2.	"Adrenalina (Spanglish version)"	3:55

== Credits and personnel ==
Credits adapted from Tidal.

- Wisin – vocal, composer, lyricist, associated performer, executive producer
- Jennifer Lopez – vocal, composer, lyricist, associated performer, featured artist
- Ricky Martin – vocal, composer, lyricist, associated performer, featured artist
- Chris Jeday – composer, lyricist, producer
- Luis Enrique Ortiz Rivera – composer, lyricist, assistant producer
- José Torres – composer, lyricist
- David Cabrera – assistant producer, co-producer, recording engineer
- Federico Vindver – keyboards
- Jaycen Joshua – mixing engineer
- Jose "Hyde" Cotto – recording engineer
- Rudy Bethancourt – recording engineer

== Charts ==
=== Weekly charts ===
Weekly peak performance for "Adrenalina"
Chart (2014–2015)	Peak position
Belgium (Ultratip Bubbling Under Wallonia)	10
Belgium Dance (Ultratop Wallonia)	26
Bulgaria Airplay (BAMP)	3
Colombia Urbano (National-Report)	1
Dominican Republic (Monitor Latino)	11
France (SNEP)	122
Finland Download (Latauslista)	10
Italy (FIMI)	52
Mexico (Billboard Mexican Airplay)	4
Poland Dance (ZPAV)	29
Spain (Promusicae)	3
Switzerland (Schweizer Hitparade)	57
US Billboard Hot 100	94
US Hot Latin Songs (Billboard)	2
US Latin Airplay (Billboard)	1
US Hot Rap Songs (Billboard)	17

=== Year-end charts ===
2014 year-end chart performance for "Adrenalina"
Chart (2014)	Position
Spain (PROMUSICAE)	10
US Hot Latin Songs (Billboard)	9

== Certifications ==
Certifications and sales for "Adrenalina"
Region	Certification	Certified units/sales
Italy (FIMI)	Gold	25,000^{‡}
Mexico (AMPROFON)	Platinum	60,000^{*}
Spain (Promusicae)	2× Platinum	80,000^{*}
United States Digital download	—	77,000 (Note: US pure sales as of July 2014)
Streaming
United States	—	89,000,000 (Note: US on-demand streams as of June 2020)
^{*} Sales figures based on certification alone.^{‡} Sales+streaming figures based on certification alone.

== Release history ==
Release dates and formats for "Adrenalina"
Region	Date	Format	Version	Label	Ref(s)
Various	February 18, 2014	Digital download	Original	Sony Latin	
Various	February 24, 2014	Contemporary hit radio	Original	Sony Latin	
Various	February 25, 2014	streaming	Original	Sony Latin	
Various	February 25, 2014	streaming	Spanglish Version	Sony Latin	
Australia	February 25, 2014	Digital download	Spanglish Version	Sony Latin	
Canada	February 25, 2014	Digital download	Spanglish Version	Sony Latin	
Europe	February 25, 2014	Digital download	Spanglish Version	Sony Latin	
New Zealand	February 25, 2014	Digital download	Spanglish Version	Sony Latin	
Mexico	February 25, 2014	Digital download	Both Versions	Sony Latin	
United States	February 25, 2014	Digital download	Both Versions	Sony Latin	
Italy	April 11, 2014	Contemporary hit radio	Spanglish Version	Sony Latin	

== See also ==
- List of Billboard Hot Latin Songs and Latin Airplay number ones of 2014
