= El Sobreviviente =

Studio album by Wisin
- Released: February 10, 2004
- Recorded: 2003–2004
- Genre: Reggaeton
- Label: Fresh Productions
- Producer: Monserrate & DJ Urba; DJ Sonic; Fido

Wisin chronology
El Sobreviviente (2004)	El Regreso del Sobreviviente (2014)

Singles from El Sobreviviente
- 1. "La Gitana" Released: 2004; 2. "Saoco" Released: 2004

El Sobreviviente ('The Survivor') is the debut studio album by Wisin. It was originally released on February 10, 2004. It was re-released on January 30, 2007. It was published on February 10, 2004 under Fresh Productions, it has 14 songs and collaborations with singers such as Daddy Yankee, Alexis & Fido, Tony Dize and Gallego. Songs from the album, such as "Wisin, Mátalos" and "Saquen Los Fulls", were part of a lyrical war with Don Omar and Héctor el Father.

== Track listing ==
No.	Title	Producer(s)	Length
1.	"Intro"	Monserrate & DJ Urba	1:41
2.	"La Gitana"	DJ Sonic	2:54
3.	"Wisin, Mátalos"	Monserrate & DJ Urba	2:42
4.	"Saoco" (featuring Daddy Yankee)	Monserrate & DJ Urba; Fido	3:04
5.	"Tu Cuerpo Me Llama"	Monserrate & DJ Urba	3:00
6.	"La Camella"	Monserrate & DJ Urba	3:12
7.	"El Jinete" (featuring Alexis & Fido)	DJ Urba; Fido	3:04
8.	"En Busca De Un Caldo"	Monserrate & DJ Urba	3:44
9.	"No Sé" (featuring Tony Dize)	Monserrate & DJ Urba	2:59
10.	"Mujeres Hagan Fila"	DJ Sonic	2:53
11.	"Estoy Preso" (featuring Gallego)	DJ Sonic	4:01
12.	"Siente El Calor" (featuring Tony Dize)	DJ Urba; Fido	2:36
13.	"Riendo Para No Llorar"	DJ Sonic	3:24
14.	"Saquen Los Fulls"	DJ Sonic; Monserrate & DJ Urba	5:20
Total length:			44:42

== Charts ==
Chart (2004)	Peak Position
US Top Latin Albums (Billboard)	20
US Top Heatseekers (Billboard)	44
US Top Heatseekers (South Atlantic) (Billboard)	1
US Latin Pop Albums (Billboard)	9
Chart (2007)	Peak Position
US Latin Rhythm Albums (Billboard)	16
