= Los Vaqueros: La Trilogía =

Studio album by Wisin
- Released: September 4, 2015
- Recorded: 2014–2015
- Genre: Reggaeton; Latin pop; electropop
- Length: 1:34:27
- Label: Sony Latin
- Producer: Luny Tunes, Hyde, Chris Jedi, Haze, Gocho, Mueka, Santana, Noriega, DJ Luian, O'Neill, Bory, DJ Duran "The Coach", Jumbo, Edup, Marc & Rafy "Los Legendarios", Federico Vindver, Dave Cabrera y Linares

Wisin chronology
El Regreso Del Sobreviviente (2014)	Los Vaqueros: La Trilogía (2015)	Victory (2017)

Singles from Los Vaqueros: La Trilogía
- 1. "Nota De Amor" Released: February 3, 2015; 2. "Que Se Sienta El Deseo" Released: September 4, 2015; 3. "Piquete" Released: October 30, 2015; 4. "Corazón Acelerado" Released: November 6, 2015; 5. "Tu Libertad" Released: November 24, 2015

Los Vaqueros 3: La Trilogía (English: The Cowboys: The Trilogy) is the third solo studio album by Puerto Rican reggaeton artist Wisin. It is also the third installment of the "Los Vaqueros" series. The album was released on September 4, 2015. It was originally supposed to be on September 11, 2015. However, it got leaked online on August 30, 2015. Wisin would eventually release it earlier than the original date because of the pirating situation with the album.

== Track listing ==
Disc 1
No.	Title	Writer(s)	Producer(s)	Length
1.	"Los Vaqueros" (featuring Gavilán, Arcángel, Baby Rasta, Cosculluela, Franco "El Gorila", Tito El Bambino, Ñengo Flow, J Álvarez, Farruko, Pusho & Jenay)	Gavilán / Juan Luis Morera / Austin Santos / Wilmer Alicea / José Cosculluela / Luis Cortes / Edwin Rosa / Javid Álvarez / Carlos Reyes / Emmanuel Birriel	Hyde, Haze, DJ Luian, Mueka	8:48
2.	"Amenázame"	Juan Luis Morera	Hyde, Haze	3:45
3.	"Piquete" (featuring Plan B)	Juan Luis Morera / Orlando Vega / Edwin Vega	Haze, Hyde, DJ Duran	4:11
4.	"Amor De Locos" (featuring Jory & Jenay)	Juan Luis Morera / Fernando Sierra / Jenay	Haze, Hyde	4:27
5.	"Que Se Sienta El Deseo" (featuring Ricky Martin)	Juan Luis Morera / Ricky Martin	Chris Jedi, O'Neill, Federico Vindver, Dave Cabrera, Marc & Rafy "Los Legendarios"	4:11
6.	"Caramelo" (featuring Franco "El Gorila" & Cosculluela)	Juan Luis Morera / Luis Torres / José Cosculluela	Hyde, Haze, Mueka	4:17
7.	"Traviesa"	Juan Luis Morera	Hyde, Santana	3:52
8.	"Nota De Amor" (with Carlos Vives featuring Daddy Yankee)	Juan Luis Morera / Carlos Vives / Raymond Ayala	Marc & Rafy "Los Legendarios"	3:52
9.	"Callaíto" (featuring Baby Rasta & Gringo)	Juan Luis Morera / Wilmer Alicea / Samuel Gerena	Hyde, Santana, Haze, Linares	2:55
10.	"Faldita Esa"	Juan Luis Morera	Luny Tunes, Haze	3:06
11.	"Dime Qué Sucedió" (featuring Tony Dize)	Juan Luis Morera / Antonio Rivera	Hyde, Haze, Noriega, Marc y Rafy	4:09

Disc 2
No.	Title	Writer(s)	Producer(s)	Length
1.	"Corazón Acelerado"	Juan Luis Morera, Luis O'Neill	Hyde, Noriega, O'Neill	3:45
2.	"Luna Llena"	Juan Luis Morera	Haze, Hyde, Fred Chirivella (Ukulele & Guitar)	3:37
3.	"Ahí Es Que Es" (featuring J Álvarez)	Juan Luis Morera / Javid Álvarez	Jumbo, Hyde, Marc & Rafy "Los Legendarios"	4:22
4.	"Tu Libertad" (featuring Prince Royce)	Juan Luis Morera / Geoffrey Rojas	Hyde, Noriega, O'Neill, Bory	4:04
5.	"Poder" (featuring Farruko)	Juan Luis Morera / Carlos Reyes	Hyde, Jumbo	4:10
6.	"Nos Queremos" (featuring Divino)	Juan Luis Morera / Daniel Velázquez	Hyde, Haze, Santana	3:47
7.	"Yo Me Dejo" (featuring Alexis)	Juan Luis Morera / Raúl Ortiz	Hyde, Haze	3:29
8.	"Ven Báilame" (featuring Gocho)	Juan Luis Morera / José Torres	Gocho, Hyde, O'Neill	4:21
9.	"Pégate Pa' Que Veas" (featuring Franco "El Gorila" & Eloy)	Juan Luis Morera / Luis Torres / Luis Eloy Del Valle	Jumbo, Hyde, Edup	3:20
10.	"Prisionero" (featuring Pedro Capó & Axel)	Juan Luis Morera / Pedro Capó / Axel Witteveen Pardo	Hyde, O'Neill	3:39
11.	"Adictos A Tus Besos" (featuring Los Cadillacs)	Juan Luis Morera / Luis Romero / Emilio Vizcaíno	Luny Tunes	4:11
12.	"Que Se Sienta El Deseo" (W Version)	Juan Luis Morera / Ricky Martin	O'Neill, Chris Jedi	4:11

Bonus Tracks
No.	Title	Writer(s)	Producer(s)	Length
1.	"Yo Quiero Contigo"	Juan Luis Morera	Hyde, O'Neill	3:55
2.	"Yo Quiero Contigo" (Remix) (featuring Plan B)	Juan Luis Morera / Orlando Vega / Edwin Vega	Hyde, O'Neill	4:41
3.	"Corazón Acelerado" (Popular Versión) (featuring Pipe Bueno)	Juan Luis Morera, Luis O'Neill	Hyde, Noriega, O'Neill	3:40

== Charts ==
Chart (2015)	Peak position
US Top Latin Albums (Billboard)	1
US Latin Rhythm Albums (Billboard)	1
US Top Rap Albums (Billboard)	15

== Certifications ==
Region	Certification	Certified units/sales
United States (RIAA)	Platinum (Latin)	60,000^{‡}
^{‡} Sales+streaming figures based on certification alone.
