= Assia Ahhatt =

Ukrainian singer and violinist

Assia Ahhatt Ассія Ахат
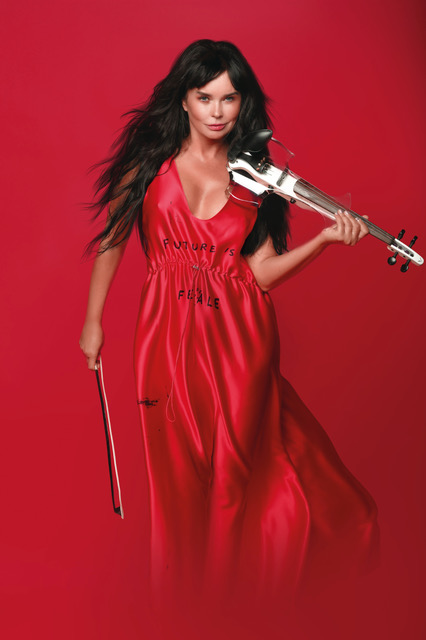

Background information
- Born: 3 June 1965 (age 61); Kyiv, Ukraine
- Genres: Classical music, Pop
- Occupations: Singer, violinist
- Website: assiaahhatt.com

Assia Ahhatt (born June 3, 1965) is a violinist, singer, composer, producer, Merited Artist of Ukraine, Grammy Award nominee, Grammy voting member, laureate, and diploma winner of international competitions.

== Early life and education ==
Ahhatt was born in Kyiv, capital of former Ukrainian Soviet Socialist Republic. She graduated from Glier College of Music and National Music Academy, both located in Kyiv, Ukraine. After her graduation, she completed an internship at The Music Academy in Nice, France (French: Academie de musique de Nice).

== Career ==
Ahhatt was the soloist of the Ukrainian National Philharmonic. During a short period of time, Ahhatt was able to achieve significant results in her professional career. She performed at well-known concert halls in Germany, France, Italy and other European countries, and won nominations and awards in several European music festivals and competitions.

Her first solo release in 1999, Homo Novus, represented a mix of instrumental and modern music (classical music in a self composed modern arrangement). To promote this album, Ahhatt toured over the biggest cities nationwide.

Ahhatt began her career as a singer in 2002. That same year, she signed a deal with EMI Records (Poland).

Later Ahhatt signed another deal with Universal Poland, and recorded a song "Where Are You Now?" as a duet with Polish-born Hollywood actor Bogusław Linda. The song instantly became a hit in several European countries. Linda also starred in the video for the above-mentioned song. In 2022, Ahhatt signed with Universal/Ukrainian Records.

Her next album Chocolad (Chocolate) was released in 2003, it contained songs in Russian, Polish and French. Ahhatt later surprised fans by performing the song “Mechty” ("Dreams") in an unknown language which she created by herself. This song, along with other ones, composed by Ahhatt herself, were included into the new album Dysha bolela (Soul Hurts) and released in 2005.

In 2005, Ahhatt formed the duo “69” and became its producer and co-songwriter. Albums Goryachiy pocelui (Горячий поцелуй; Hot Kiss) and I Like It were released in 2006, in partnership with "69".

In 2007, her new album “Я лучшая” (Ya lychshaya, I Am the Best) was released. In 2010, Ahhatt released the album Angeli ne kuryat (Ангелы не курят, Angels Don't Smoke).

She has successfully combined her singing and songwriting talents, having appeared on stage with iconic performers including Robert Plant, Mark Knopfler, Jean-Luc Ponty, and Pierre Blanchard. She also performed with musicians such as Kurt Elling and trumpet player Chris Botti, and award-winning music composer Eric Serra.

Ahhatt records in the leading studios in Europe and the West Lake Studio in Los Angeles, US. Studios recorded her debut U.S. single "If Only Tonight" (2013) that instantly became a hit in America and headed several U.S. Charts:

- Billboard's Hot Single Chart (#6 in Billboard's 2014 - Singles Chart)
- DRT National Airplay Top 50 Independent Chart
- DRT National Airplay Top 50 R&B/ Hip Hop Chart
- Indie Label Report-Rhythmic

The “If Only Tonight” remix, made by legendary DJ Ralphi Rosario, became an instant hit in major dance clubs from New York to Miami, Los Angeles to Honolulu; and was featured on Billboard's National Dance Club Chart for several consecutive weeks.

Following the success of “If Only Tonight” Ahhatt turned her attention towards the Latin market. Her next single, "Fiesta in San Juan", ft. Puerto Rican rapper, Wisin, is a dynamic dance composition, infused with the sounds of a violin solo. "Fiesta in San Juan" was again in Billboard's Latin Tropical Chart, and its remix rapidly approached Top 10 in Billboard's National Dance Club Chart.

The video appearance of Ahhatt and WISIN's interplay in Spanish, filmed in Old San Juan, was produced and directed by Hollywood music video director, Jessy Terrero.

Ahhatt released her award-winning single "Disco", produced by Dmitry Monatik, Chilibisound in 2016. In April 2017, Ahhatt debut her single, "Perepletaet", to audiences in her home city of Kyiv.

Ahhatt's next single "You Will Miss Me" was released in 2017 and was produced by Luny Tunes. It was recorded at Hit Factory Criteria in Miami.

Her album All-In was released in 2018 in the United States. Ahhatt contracted her personal recording label, “Seize the Day Entertaining” with one of the music world's legendary producers, 17-times Grammy winner Humberto Gatica, based in Los Angeles. He is known for his association with Madonna, Elton John, Celine Dion, Toni Braxton, and Andrea Bocelli, among many others. The project features Ahhatt performing violin solos which cover thirteen international hit singles, supported by a full orchestra. Ahhatt led several national and international tours.

Next, a violinist's live show “A Music Extravaganza” was directed by PBS award-winning producer Gene Bortnick and recorded in the Opera House of Kyiv in Ukraine. The show aired across America on PBS stations from June 2019 until early 2020 and based upon its success, it was aired again in September 2020.

Ahhatt conceived her new album A Date at the Movies, while on her U.S. concert tour for "A Music Extravaganza" in 2019 and 2020. In 2020, Ahhatt released the album A Date at the Movies, featuring well-known performers including Barbra Streisand, Elvis Presley, Celine Dion, and Lady Gaga. Producers of A Date at the Movies are Humberto Gatica, Yurii Shepeta, Ahhatt and 2-time Grammy winner, Al Walser.

In 2021, Ahhatt became a voting member of the Recording Academy.

In 2022, Ahhatt released the New Age album Moments, a collaboration with David Arkenstone. The album included production credits from Tony Succar, Paul Avgerinos, and Kabir Sehgal.

In 2025, Ahhatt released the album Born in Kyiv. The album incorporated Ukrainian vocal and instrumental elements with cinematic arrangements and included the single and music video "I Dance For Gods" which was filmed in Kyiv.

In February 2026, Ahhatt returned to Ukrainian-language music with the release of the single "Алло", marking one of her first major Ukrainian-language releases following her international crossover projects

== Discography ==
Year	Title	Album details	Notes
1999	Homo Novus		
2002	To You, Anais		
2003	Chocolate		
2005	Soul Hurts		
2006	Hot Kisses		
2006	I Like It		
2007	I Am the Best		
2010	Angels Don't Smoke		
2013	If Only Tonight		
2014	Fiesta in San Juan		
2016	Disco		
2017	You Will Miss Me		
2017	Perepletaet		
2017	All-In		
2019	A Music Extravaganza (Live-In concert and album)		
2020	A Date at the Movies		
2022	Moments		
2023	8 SENSES		
2025	Born in Kyiv		
2026	Алло		
2026	Що таке кохання для тебе		

== Filmography ==
2010 —In Laws for NY
