= El Regreso del Sobreviviente =

Studio album by Wisin
- Released: March 18, 2014
- Recorded: 2013–14
- Studio: Honkey Tonk Studios; Mexico City, Mexico; Jungle City Studios; New York City, United States; J House Music Group; New York City, United States; La Base Studios; Puerto Rico; Mas Flow Studio; Puerto Rico; Roc The Mic; New York City, United States
- Genre: Reggaeton; Latin pop; electropop
- Length: 65:00
- Label: Sony Latin
- Producer: Hyde; Chris Jeday; El Profesor Gómez; Haze; Luny Tunes; JY (El De La J) Predikador; Tainy

Wisin chronology
El Sobreviviente (2004)	El Regreso del Sobreviviente (2014)	Los Vaqueros: La Trilogía (2015)

Singles from El Regreso del Sobreviviente
- 1. "Que Viva La Vida" Released: September 22, 2013; 2. "Adrenalina" Released: February 25, 2014

El Regreso del Sobreviviente (transl. The Return of the Survivor) is the second studio album (first one in 10 years as a solo artist), by Puerto Rican reggaeton artist Wisin. It is the sequel to his first studio album El Sobreviviente. It was released on March 18, 2014. The first single released as part of the album was "Que Viva La Vida" on September 22, 2013. "Adrenalina" was the second single released for the album on February 25, 2014. "Claro" and "Heavy Heavy" were released as promotional singles.

== Track listing ==
No.	Title	Length
1.	"El Sobreviviente" (featuring 50 Cent)	3:36
2.	"Mucho Bajo"	3:50
3.	"Adrenalina" (featuring Jennifer Lopez and Ricky Martin)	3:55
4.	"Adicto"	3:50
5.	"Heavy Heavy" (featuring Tempo)	4:00
6.	"Candente"	4:03
7.	"Control" (featuring Chris Brown and Pitbull)	4:54
8.	"Amor Amor"	4:17
9.	"Baby Danger" (featuring Sean Paul)	4:15
10.	"Que Viva La Vida"	3:22
11.	"Te Extraño" (featuring Franco de Vita)	5:04
12.	"Tu Cuerpo Pide Sexo" (featuring Zion)	4:38
13.	"Que Viva La Vida" (Remix) (featuring Michel Teló)	3:22
Total length:		53:14

Deluxe Edition
No.	Title	Length
14.	"Piel Con Piel"	3:31
15.	"Presión" (featuring Cosculluela)	4:05
16.	"Control" (W Version)	4:55
17.	"Claro" (featuring Jory)	3:47
18.	"Si Te Vas" (featuring Gocho)	4:55
19.	"Baby Danger" (W Version)	4:15
20.	"Heavy Heavy" (W Version)	3:44
Total length:		1:22:00

- W version means that it's only Wisin. One version features an artist while the other only has him on it.

== Charts ==
=== Weekly charts ===
Chart performance for El Regreso del Sobreviviente
Chart (2014)	Peak position
US Billboard 200	50
US Top Latin Albums (Billboard)	3
US Latin Rhythm Albums (Billboard)	1
US Top Rap Albums (Billboard)	9

=== Year-end charts ===
Year-end chart performance for El Regreso del Sobreviviente
Chart (2014)	Position
US Top Latin Albums (Billboard)	17
