= Duele el Corazón =

2016 single by Enrique Iglesias

Single by Enrique Iglesias featuring Wisin

from the album Final (Vol. 1)
- Released: 18 April 2016
- Studio: South Point Studios (Miami)
- Genre: Latin pop; reggaeton
- Length: 3:21
- Label: Sony Latin
- Songwriters: Enrique Iglesias; Patrick Ingunza; Silverlo Lozada; Juan Luis Moreira; Servando Primera; Hasibur Rahman; Francisco Saldaña
- Producers: Carlos Paucar; Francisco "Luny" Saldaña (co.)

Enrique Iglesias singles chronology
"Messin' Around" (2016)	"Duele el Corazón" (2016)	"Don't You Need Somebody" (2016)

Wisin singles chronology
"Que Se Sienta El Deseo" (2015)	"Duele el Corazón" (2016)	"Si Una Vez (If I Once)" (2016)

Music video
- "Duele el Corazón" on YouTube

"Duele el Corazón" (transl. "The Heart Hurts") is a song by Spanish singer Enrique Iglesias featuring vocals from Puerto Rican rapper Wisin. It was released on 18 April 2016 under his new record company Sony Music Latin. The song was produced by Carlos Paucar, co-produced by Juan Carlos Yepez Jr (JY "El De La J") Francisco Saldaña (Luny). The Peruvian composer Patrick Ingunza wrote the song along with Venezuelan singer Servando Primera and the Ecuadorian American record producer and songwriter Juan Carlos Yepez Jr (JY "El De La J"). There is also a Spanglish version which features American singer Tinashe and Jamaican rapper Javada.

== Background ==
In an interview with Miami's Romance 107.5 Monday, Enrique said of this song, "This song was born from an idea of one of my friends, I then worked in the studio and developed it in the studio for about eight months... which is not that much time." Adding that, "What I look for in a song is something that animates people, something that I like, If I don't like the song, I don't want to release it, because then I have to promote it and talk about it millions of times."

== Chart performance ==
"Duele el Corazón" debuted at number one on the Latin Pop Songs chart and number two on the Hot Latin Songs chart, where it climbed at number one in its second week and number one on the Latin Airplay chart.

The single in Europe reached the top 10 in countries such as Belgium, Bulgaria, France, Hungary, Italy, Netherlands, Poland, and Slovakia, peaking at number one in Spain, Portugal, Mexico, Slovenia and Switzerland. It was also a top 40 hit in Austria, the Czech Republic, and Germany.

"Duele el Corazón" became Enrique's 27th number one hit on Billboard's Hot Latin Songs chart – more the any other artist. Plus, he holds the record for "most number one debuts on Billboard's Latin Airplay chart," marking his fourth number one entry. The song debuted at number one on the Latin Airplay chart and earned the "highest single week audience for a song since 2008 with 18.6 million listeners," according to Billboard.

"Duele el Corazón" has sold over two million track equivalent sales worldwide, it reached number one in 25 digital stores around the world, and was the 61st most streamed track on Spotify with over 229 million streams.

== Music video ==
The release of the song was accompanied with an official lyric video which was uploaded to Enrique's account on YouTube, which got 50 million views in three weeks. On the same day, Enrique posted a short clip of himself shooting the official music video of the song. The official video was filmed in Panama. The video was produced by London-based production company Artist Preserve with executive producers and Enrique's long time creative collaborators Yasha Malekzad and Kasra Pezeshki. Cuban director Alejandro Pérez directed the video. The video features Swedish model Kelly Gale. It was released on YouTube on 13 May 2016.

The lyrics fit well to form a storyline combined with the depicted scenes in the music video. It is about an old love of Enrique's character with a woman with whom he had a happy relationship. But since the woman has left him for her current, abusive husband it went downhill for her. In the video, Enrique's character comes together with her but the powerful, rich abusive husband manipulates this by shooting at and kidnapping Enrique in order to prevent his wife from leaving him for Enrique as the meeting was intended for. However, as he takes Enrique, the woman arrives just on time to witness the ordeal and her wounded love, strongly disapproving the abusive husband's actions. He orders Enrique out of the helicopter and lets him go, as the master plan failed (he ultimately wanted to prevent the meeting to keep the girl for himself instead, but ends up with her witnessing the kidnapping and his crime). It is visible that the abusive husband hesitates to let him go, but the viewers see a happy end as Enrique is released to the girl to reunite. However, the video ends with a scene of Enrique leaving on his own without his true love and the helicopter passing over, implying she still went off with them, therefore sketching the scenario that the girl arriving to the ordeal only saved him from malicious intent or worse faith that would result from the kidnapping, as it was interrupted in progress, and additionally gave them room for meeting each other instead of coming back together.

== Reception and accolades ==
"Duele el Corazón" was nominated for Record of the Year and Song of the Year at the 17th Annual Latin Grammy Awards. It was also nominated for Single of the Year, Pop Song of the Year, and won for Collaboration of the Year at the 29th Lo Nuestro Awards.

== Formats and track listings ==
Digital download
No.	Title	Length
1.	"Duele el Corazón" (featuring Wisin)	3:21

Digital download – Remix
No.	Title	Length
1.	"Duele el Corazón" (Remix) (featuring Arcángel and Javada)	3:30

Digital download – Dave Audé Club Mix
No.	Title	Length
1.	"Duele el Corazón" (Dave Audé Club Mix)	4:44

Digital download – Gente de Zona Remix
No.	Title	Length
1.	"Duele el Corazón" (Remix) (featuring Gente de Zona and Wisin)	3:20

Digital download – English version
No.	Title	Length
1.	"Duele el Corazón" (English Version) (featuring Tinashe and Javada)	3:20

== Charts ==
=== Weekly charts ===
Weekly chart performance for "Duele El Corazon"
Chart (2016–17)	Peak position
Argentina (Monitor Latino)	2
Argentina Streaming (CAPIF)	1
Austria (Ö3 Austria Top 40)	6
Belgium (Ultratop Flanders)	5
Belgium (Ultratop Wallonia)	3
Brazil (Brasil Hot 100)	2
Colombia (National-Report)	3
Czech Republic Airplay (ČNS IFPI)	1
Czech Republic Singles Digital (ČNS IFPI)	1
Dominican Republic (Monitor Latino)	13
Ecuador (National-Report)	1
Euro Digital Songs (Billboard)	13
Finland Download (Latauslista)	3
France (SNEP)	3
Germany (GfK)	13
Guatemala (Monitor Latino)	1
Hungary (Dance Top 40)	2
Hungary (Rádiós Top 40)	1
Hungary (Single Top 40)	2
Israel International Airplay (Media Forest)	1
Italy (FIMI)	4
Mexico (Billboard Mexican Airplay)	1
Mexico (Monitor Latino)	1
Netherlands (Dutch Top 40)	7
Netherlands (Single Top 100)	14
Panama (Monitor Latino)	7
Poland Airplay (ZPAV)	2
Portugal Digital Songs (Billboard)	1
Romania (Airplay 100)	1
Romania Airplay (Media Forest)	1
Slovakia Airplay (ČNS IFPI)	1
Slovakia Singles Digital (ČNS IFPI)	11
Slovenia (SloTop50)	1
Spain (PROMUSICAE)	1
Sweden (Sverigetopplistan)	7
Switzerland (Schweizer Hitparade)	1
Uruguay (Monitor Latino)	10
US Billboard Hot 100	82
US Dance Club Songs (Billboard)	1
US Hot Latin Songs (Billboard)	1
US Latin Airplay (Billboard)	1
Venezuela (National-Report)	1

=== Year-end charts ===
Chart (2016)	Position
Argentina (CAPIF)	6
Argentina (Monitor Latino)	3
Austria (Ö3 Austria Top 40)	36
Belgium (Ultratop Flanders)	23
Belgium (Ultratop Wallonia)	15
Brazil Airplay (Billboard Brasil)	58
France (SNEP)	35
Germany (Official German Charts)	62
Hungary (Dance Top 40)	19
Hungary (Rádiós Top 40)	19
Hungary (Single Top 40)	7
Italy (FIMI)	6
Netherlands (Dutch Top 40)	20
Netherlands (Single Top 100)	45
Poland (ZPAV)	19
Slovenia (SloTop50)	10
Spain (PROMUSICAE)	1
Sweden (Sverigetopplistan)	77
Switzerland (Schweizer Hitparade)	13
US Dance Club Songs (Billboard)	16
US Hot Latin Songs (Billboard)	2
US Latin Airplay (Billboard)	2
Chart (2017)	Position
Argentina (Monitor Latino)	76
Hungary (Dance Top 40)	9
Hungary (Rádiós Top 40)	24
Hungary (Single Top 40)	40
Slovenia (SloTop50)	24
Spain (PROMUSICAE)	79
US Hot Latin Songs (Billboard)	94
Chart (2022)	Position
Hungary (Rádiós Top 40)	56

=== Decade-end charts ===
Chart (2010–2019)	Position
US Hot Latin Songs (Billboard)	24

== Certifications ==
Region	Certification	Certified units/sales
Austria (IFPI Austria)	Gold	15,000^{‡}
Belgium (BRMA)	Platinum	20,000^{‡}
Brazil (Pro-Música Brasil)	Diamond	250,000^{‡}
Canada (Music Canada)	Platinum	80,000^{‡}
Denmark (IFPI Danmark)	Gold	45,000^{‡}
France (SNEP)	Diamond	233,333^{‡}
Germany (BVMI)	Gold	200,000^{‡}
Italy (FIMI)	6× Platinum	300,000^{‡}
Mexico (AMPROFON)	Diamond+2× Platinum	420,000^{‡}
Poland (ZPAV)	Diamond	100,000^{‡}
Portugal (AFP)	Platinum	10,000^{‡}
Spain (Promusicae)	6× Platinum	240,000^{‡}
Sweden (GLF)	3× Platinum	120,000^{‡}
United Kingdom (BPI)	Silver	200,000^{‡}
United States (RIAA)	12× Platinum (Latin)	720,000^{‡}
Streaming
Chile (Profovi)	Platinum	24,000,000
^{‡} Sales+streaming figures based on certification alone.

== See also ==
- List of Airplay 100 number ones of the 2010s
- List of number-one songs of 2016 (Mexico)
- List of number-one dance singles of 2016 (U.S.)
- List of number-one Billboard Hot Latin Songs of 2016

== Personnel ==
Associated Performer: Enrique Iglesias feat. Wisin

Composer, Lyricist: Juan Luis Moreira

Percussion: Richard Bravo

Composer, Lyricist: Francisco Saldana

Bass: Richard Marcel

Composer, Lyricist: Hasibur Rahman

Other, Composer, Lyricist: Patrick A. Ingunza

Background Vocal, Guitar, Engineer, Mixing Engineer, Producer: Carlos Paucar

Composer, Lyricist: Servando Moriche Primera Mussett

Background Vocal: Willy Perez Feria

Background Vocal: Fabián Alicastro

Composer, Lyricist: Silverlo Lozada

Background Vocal: Michael Cosculluela

Background Vocal: Eddie Roses

Background Vocal: Elias Ponce

Co- Producer: Luny Tunes

Mastering Engineer: Tom Coyne

Mastering Engineer: Aya Merrill

Recording Engineer: Jose Hyde Cotto

Recording Engineer: Daniel Abrusci
