= Que Se Sienta el Deseo =

Single by Wisin featuring Ricky Martin

from the album Los Vaqueros 3: La Trilogía
- Released: September 4, 2015
- Genre: Electropop
- Length: 4:11
- Label: Sony Music Latin
- Songwriters: Wisin; Ricky Martin; Luis A. O'Neill; Marcos A. Ramírez Carrasquillo; Víctor R. Torres Betancourt
- Producer: Los Legendarios

Wisin singles chronology
"Rumba" (2015)	"Que Se Sienta el Deseo" (2015)	"Duele el Corazón" (2016)

Ricky Martin singles chronology
"La Mordidita" (2015)	"Que Se Sienta El Deseo" (2015)	"Perdóname" (2016)

Music video
- "Que Se Sienta El Deseo" on YouTube

"Que Se Sienta el Deseo" is a song by Puerto Rican singer Wisin featuring also Puerto Rican singer Ricky Martin. It was released on September 4, 2015, as the second single from his third studio album, Los Vaqueros 3: La trilogía (2015).

== Music video ==
The music video was directed by Jessy Terrero and released on October 2, 2015.

== Chart performance ==
Que Se Sienta El Deseo entered the Billboard charts in September 2015 and peaked in December at number fifteen on the Hot Latin Songs (number four on Latin Airplay and number twelve on Latin Digital Songs). Other peaks include: number three on Latin Rhythm Airplay, number four on Latin Pop Airplay, number thirty-seven on Tropical Songs, and number seven on Latin Rhythm Digital Songs. "Que Se Sienta El Deseo" also reached number thirty-five on Mexican Espanol Airplay.

== Live performances ==
Wisin and Ricky Martin performed the song at the Latin Grammy Awards on November 19, 2015.

== Cover versions ==
"Que Se Sienta El Deseo" was covered by the contestants of Latin American singing competition series, La Banda. It was performed live during the semi-final on December 6, 2015.

== Charts ==
Chart (2015)	Peak position
Mexico (Billboard Espanol Airplay)	35
US Hot Latin Songs (Billboard)	15
US Latin Airplay (Billboard)	4
US Latin Pop Airplay (Billboard)	4
US Latin Rhythm Airplay (Billboard)	3
US Tropical Airplay (Billboard)	37
