= Escápate Conmigo (song) =

Single by Wisin featuring Ozuna

from the album Victory
- Language: Spanish
- English title: "Escape with Me"
- Released: March 31, 2017
- Genre: Reggaeton
- Length: 3:52
- Label: Sony Latin
- Songwriters: Marco Ramírez; Víctor Torres; Juan Luis Morera; Juan Carlos Ozuna; Christian Linares-Carrasquillo
- Producer: Wisin

Wisin singles chronology
"Si Una Vez (If I Once)" (2016)	"Escápate Conmigo" (2017)	"Si Tú la Ves" (2017)

Ozuna singles chronology
"Dile La Verdad" (2017)	"Escápate Conmigo" (2017)	"Tu Foto" (2017)

Music video
- "Escápate Conmigo" on YouTube

"Escápate Conmigo" (transl. "Escape with Me") is a song by Puerto Rican rapper Wisin from his fourth studio album, Victory (2017). Featuring fellow Puerto Rican singer and rapper Ozuna, the track was released by Sony Music Latin on March 31, 2017. It was written by Ozuna, Marco Ramírez, Víctor Torres, Christian Linares-Carrasquillo, and Wisin, who also produced the song. The song peaked at number three on the US Billboard Hot Latin Songs chart. A remix featuring Bad Bunny, De la Ghetto, Arcángel, Noriel, and Almighty was released on July 7, 2017.

== Background ==
In an interview with El Universal, talking about the differences between the single and his previous collaborations, Wisin said: "I always try to do different and bold things and I think that's the key because when you do, two things happen: either you cannot give the audience what they want to hear or you gave something so refreshing that they could connect more with you and your music." The song was previously leaked on social media, which forced him to officially release the song a week early. When asked about his view, Wisin said: "That's the deal. We artists have to understand that we are living in a world that has evolved a lot technologically. Maybe physical discs are no longer sold, but there are different platforms that help the whole planet to listen to our music. Sometimes we win, sometimes we lose, pirate themes and that is part of the fury, the affection and the desire that millions of fans have to listen to your work; We only have to keep making good music and intend to bring joy to the people, that is the most important thing."

== Chart performance ==
The song moved from 48 to 15 on Billboard's Hot Latin Songs chart on April 22, 2017, following the release of its music video. It gained 1.4 million streams in the tracking week ending April 6, 2017. It also peaked at 5 on the Latin Rhythm Airplay chart, making it Wisin's best entrance as lead artist since 2014. It is also Ozuna's second-best chart peak on the Hot Latin Songs chart.

As of August 2025, the music video for the song has received over 1.7 billion views on YouTube.

== Live performances ==
On April 27, 2017, Wisin and Ozuna performed the song at the 2017 Billboard Latin Music Awards, which was held at the University of Miami Watsco Center.

== Critical reception ==
Andreína Longoria of El Sol de Tijuana regarded the song as an "explosive combination".

== Charts ==
=== Weekly charts ===
Chart (2017–18)	Peak position
Argentina (Monitor Latino)	16
Bolivia (Monitor Latino)	2
Colombia (National-Report)	4
Dominican Republic (Monitor Latino)	1
El Salvador (Monitor Latino)	4
Honduras (Monitor Latino)	5
Mexico Airplay (Billboard)	10
Paraguay (Monitor Latino)	5
Portugal (AFP)	62
Spain (Promusicae)	40
Uruguay (Monitor Latino)	13
US Billboard Hot 100	63
US Hot Latin Songs (Billboard)	3
US Latin Airplay (Billboard)	1
US Latin Rhythm Airplay (Billboard)	1
Venezuela (National-Report)	1

=== Year-end charts ===
Chart (2017)	Position
Argentina (CAPIF)	6
Argentina (Monitor Latino)	53
México (AMPROFON)	5
Spain (PROMUSICAE)	10
US Hot Latin Songs (Billboard)	5

Chart (2018)	Position
US Hot Latin Songs (Billboard)	39

=== Decade-end charts ===
Chart (2010–2019)	Position
US Hot Latin Songs (Billboard)	39

== Certifications ==
Region	Certification	Certified units/sales
Chile	5× Platinum	
Italy (FIMI)	Platinum	50,000^{‡}
Mexico (AMPROFON)	3× Diamond+Platinum	960,000^{‡}
Spain (Promusicae)	4× Platinum	160,000^{‡}
United States (RIAA)	4× Platinum (Latin)	240,000^{‡}
Streaming
Chile (Profovi)	2× Platinum	16,000,000
^{‡} Sales+streaming figures based on certification alone.

== See also ==
- List of Billboard number-one Latin songs of 2017
