= Nota de Amor =

Single by Wisin and Carlos Vives featuring Daddy Yankee

from the album Los Vaqueros: La Trilogía
- Released: February 3, 2015
- Genre: Latin pop
- Length: 3:52
- Label: Sony Music Latin
- Songwriters: JY (El De La J); Juan Luis Morera; Carlos Vives; Andrés Castro; Ramón Luis Ayala
- Producers: JY (El De La J) and Los Legendarios

Wisin singles chronology
"Me Marcharé" (2015)	"Nota de Amor" (2015)	"Dale Frontu" (2015)

Carlos Vives singles chronology
"Dame una Sonrisa" (2015)	"Nota de Amor" (2015)	"Las Cosas de la Vida" (2015)

Daddy Yankee singles chronology
"Sabado Rebelde" (2014)	"Nota de Amor" (2015)	"Sígueme y Te Sigo" (2015)

"Nota de Amor" ("Love Note") is a song by Puerto Rican rapper and singer Wisin and Colombian singer Carlos Vives, featuring fellow Puerto Rican rapper and singer Daddy Yankee. It was the lead single for Wisin's third studio album Los Vaqueros: La Trilogía (2015).

== Charts ==
=== Weekly charts ===
Chart (2015)	Peak position
Colombia (National-Report)	2
Dominican Republic Pop Chart (Monitor Latino)	3
Ecuador (National-Report)	16
Mexico (Billboard Mexican Airplay)	41
US Hot Latin Songs (Billboard)	5
US Latin Airplay (Billboard)	1
US Latin Rhythm Airplay (Billboard)	1
US Tropical Airplay (Billboard)	29
Venezuela (Record Report)	14

=== Year-end charts ===
Chart (2015)	Position
US Hot Latin Songs (Billboard)	22

== Certifications ==
Region	Certification	Certified units/sales
Mexico (AMPROFON)	Gold	30,000^{*}
Spain (Promusicae)	Gold	30,000^{‡}
United States (RIAA)	5× Platinum (Latin)	300,000^{‡}
^{*} Sales figures based on certification alone.^{‡} Sales+streaming figures based on certification alone.

== See also ==
- List of Billboard number-one Latin songs of 2015
