= Wisin =

Puerto Rican rapper (born 1978)

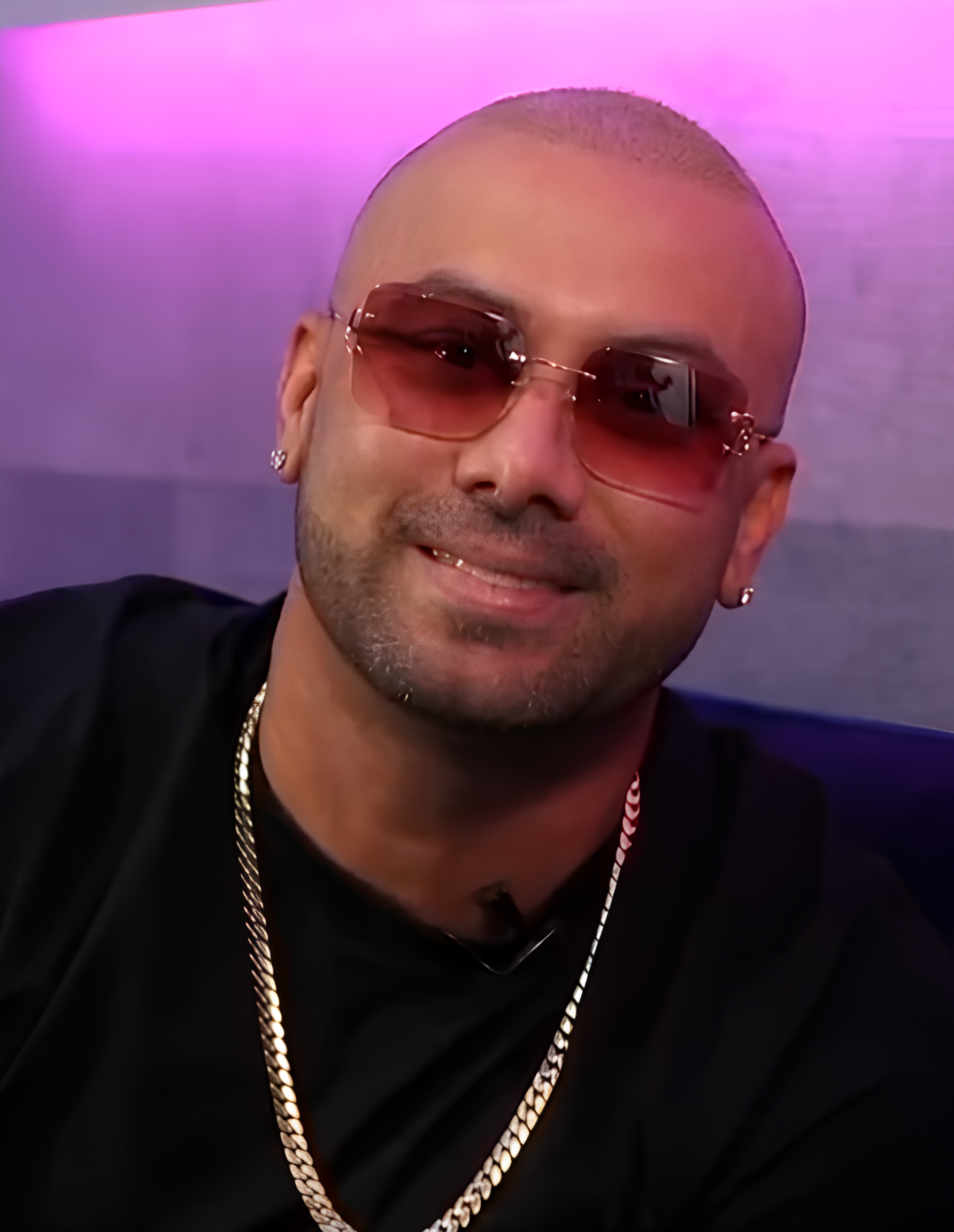
- Wisin in 2021
- Born: Juan Luis Morera Luna; December 19, 1978 (age 47); Cayey, Puerto Rico
- Other names: W; El Sobreviviente
- Occupations: Rapper; singer; record producer
- Spouse: Yomaira Ortiz (m. 2008)
- Children: 3
- Musical career
- Genres: Reggaeton; urban pop; Latin hip hop; dancehall
- Years active: 1998–present
- Labels: Sony Latin; La Base; WK; WY; Machete; Fresh; Líderes

Juan Luis Morera Luna (Latin American Spanish pronunciation: [ˈxwan ˈlwis moˈɾeɾa ˈluna]; born December 19, 1978), known professionally as Wisin (Latin American Spanish pronunciation: [ˈɣ̝ʷisin]), is a Puerto Rican rapper, singer and record producer, best known as a member of the reggaeton duo Wisin & Yandel. Wisin is noted for his unique and aggressive style of rapping.

== Career ==
Wisin met Yandel in school. They began performing as a duo in the late 1990s and made their album debut in 2000 with Los Reyes del Nuevo Milenio. They later made the jump to a major label in 2003 with Mi Vida... My Life, their first for Universal subsidiary Machete Music. Pa'l Mundo then catapulted them to mainstream success in 2005. Subsequently, Wisin & Yandel established their own label, WY Records, and presented an affiliate group, Los Vaqueros.

In November 2013, after the duo's Líderes tour, the duo went into hiatus, but although rumors saying their split was because of differences between them, Yandel denied those rumors and confirmed they are not disbanded.

Wisin released his first solo album El Sobreviviente in 2004, and ten years later, in 2014, his second solo studio album, El Regreso del Sobreviviente was released.

Wisin & Yandel reunited in 2018 and released their tenth studio album after spending five years apart. The new album was called "Los Campeones del Pueblo / "The Big Leagues".

On July 11, 2018, Telemundo announced Wisin as a coach on La Voz (U.S.). Wisin joined Luis Fonsi, Carlos Vives and Alejandra Guzmán as coaches on the Spanish-language version of NBC singing-competition The Voice.

== Personal life ==
Wisin is married to Yomaira Ortiz Feliciano. The couple married on July 26, 2008, in Wisin's hometown of Cayey, Puerto Rico after four years together. They have three living children; another died at one month of age.

== Discography ==
Studio albums

- 2004: El Sobreviviente
- 2014: El Regreso del Sobreviviente
- 2015: Los Vaqueros: La Trilogía
- 2017: Victory
- 2024: Mr. W
- 2025: El Sobreviviente WWW
- 2026: La Universidad del Perreo

with Los Legendarios

- 2021: Los Legendarios 001
- 2022: Multimillo, Vol. 1

== Filmography ==
Film
Year	Film	Director	Character	Notes
2005	Mi Vida: La Pelicula	David Impelluso	Himself	An autobiographical documentary focusing on Wisin & Yandel's life.

Television
Year	Television show	Character	Notes
2009	Verano de amor	Himself	Guest star (with Yandel)
2013	La Voz... México	Coach	Season 3 (with Yandel)
2016	Nuestra Belleza Latina 2016	Himself	Music guest (Season 10)
2016	La Banda	Judge	Season 2
2018	Talento FOX	Judge / Producer	Season 1
2019	La Voz	Coach	Season 1

== Awards and nominations ==
Award	Year	Recipient(s) and nominee(s)	Category	Result	Ref.
ASCAP Latin Awards	2017	"Duele El Corazón" (with Enrique Iglesias)	Song of the Year	Won	
ASCAP Latin Awards	2017	"Corazón Acelerao"	Winning Songs	Won	
ASCAP Latin Awards	2019	"Me Niego" (with Reik & Ozuna)	Winning Songs	Won	
ASCAP Latin Awards	2019	"Quisiera Alejarme"	Winning Songs	Won	
ASCAP Latin Awards	2019	"Solita" (with Bad Bunny, Ozuna & Almighty)	Winning Songs	Won	
ASCAP Latin Awards	2022	"Fiel" (with Jhayco)	Winning Songs	Won	
ASCAP Latin Awards	2022	"Mi Niña" (with Myke Towers)	Winning Songs	Won	
Billboard Music Awards	2017	"Duele El Corazón" (with Enrique Iglesias)	Top Latin Song	Nominated	
Billboard Music Awards	2018	"Escápate Conmigo" (with Ozuna)	Top Latin Song	Nominated	
Billboard Latin Music Awards	2015	Himself	Latin Rhythm Songs Artist of the Year, Solo	Nominated	
Billboard Latin Music Awards	2015	Himself	Latin Rhythm Albums Artist of the Year, Solo	Won	
Billboard Latin Music Awards	2015	"Adrenalina" (with Jennifer Lopez & Ricky Martin)	Latin Rhythm Song of the Year	Nominated	
Billboard Latin Music Awards	2015	El Regreso del Sobreviviente	Latin Rhythm Album of the Year	Won	
Billboard Latin Music Awards	2017	"Duele El Corazón" (with Enrique Iglesias)	Hot Latin Song of the Year	Nominated	
Billboard Latin Music Awards	2017	"Duele El Corazón" (with Enrique Iglesias)	Hot Latin Song of the Year, Vocal Event	Won	
Billboard Latin Music Awards	2017	"Duele El Corazón" (with Enrique Iglesias)	Airplay Song of the Year	Won	
Billboard Latin Music Awards	2017	"Duele El Corazón" (with Enrique Iglesias)	Digital Song of the Year	Nominated	
Billboard Latin Music Awards	2017	"Duele El Corazón" (with Enrique Iglesias)	Streaming Song of the Year	Nominated	
Billboard Latin Music Awards	2017	"Duele El Corazón" (with Enrique Iglesias)	Latin Pop Song of the Year	Won	
Billboard Latin Music Awards	2018	"Escápate Conmigo" (with Ozuna)	Hot Latin Song of the Year	Nominated	
Billboard Latin Music Awards	2018	"Escápate Conmigo" (with Ozuna)	Hot Latin Song of the Year – Vocal Event	Nominated	
Billboard Latin Music Awards	2018	"Escápate Conmigo" (with Ozuna)	Airplay Song of the Year	Nominated	
Billboard Latin Music Awards	2018	"Escápate Conmigo" (with Ozuna)	Latin Rhythm Song of the Year	Nominated	
Billboard Latin Music Awards	2018	Himself	Producer of the Year	Nominated	
Billboard Latin Music Awards	2019	"Me Niego" (with Reik & Ozuna)	Airplay Song of the Year	Nominated	
Billboard Latin Music Awards	2019	"Me Niego" (with Reik & Ozuna)	Latin Pop Song of the Year	Won	
Billboard Latin Music Awards	2019	"Me Niego" (with Reik & Ozuna)	Latin Rhythm Song of the Year	Nominated	
Billboard Latin Music Awards	2024	"La Misión" (with Piso 21)	Latin Pop Song of the Year	Nominated	
Billboard Latin Music Awards	2024	"Bien Loco" (with Mora)	Latin Rhythm Song of the Year	Nominated	
Billboard Latin Music Awards	2026	"Que Me Quiera Má" (with Marc Anthony)	Tropical Song of the Year	Pending	
BMI Latin Awards	2016	"Adrenalina" (with Jennifer Lopez & Ricky Martin)	Winning Songs	Won	
BMI Latin Awards	2017	"Nota de Amor" (with Carlos Vives & Daddy Yankee)	Winning Songs	Won	
BMI Latin Awards	2018	"Duele El Corazón" (with Enrique Iglesias)	Winning Songs	Won	
BMI Latin Awards	2018	"Que Se Sienta El Deseo" (with Ricky Martin)	Winning Songs	Won	
BMI Latin Awards	2018	"Vacaciones"	Winning Songs	Won	
BMI Latin Awards	2019	"Escápate Conmigo" (with Ozuna)	Winning Songs	Won	
BMI Latin Awards	2020	"Me Niego" (with Reik & Ozuna)	Winning Songs	Won	
BMI Latin Awards	2020	"Solita" (with Bad Bunny, Ozuna & Almighty)	Winning Songs	Won	
BMI Latin Awards	2023	"Fiel" (with Jhayco)	Winning Songs	Won	
BMI Latin Awards	2023	"Mi Niña" (with Myke Towers)	Winning Songs	Won	
Heat Latin Music Awards	2015	Himself	Best Male Artist	Nominated	
Heat Latin Music Awards	2015	Himself	Best Urban Artist	Nominated	
Heat Latin Music Awards	2015	"Adrenalina" (with Jennifer Lopez & Ricky Martin)	Best Music Video	Nominated	
Heat Latin Music Awards	2017	Himself	Best North Region Artist	Nominated	
Heat Latin Music Awards	2019	"Me Niego" (with Reik & Ozuna)	Best Collaboration	Nominated	
Heat Latin Music Awards	2021	"Mi Niña" (Remix) (with Myke Towers, Anitta & Maluma)	Best Music Video	Won	
Heat Latin Music Awards	2022	Himself	Best Male Artist	Won	
Heat Latin Music Awards	2022	Himself	Best Urban Artist	Nominated	
Heat Latin Music Awards	2022	"Buenos Días" (with Camilo & Los Legendarios)	Best Music Video	Nominated	
Heat Latin Music Awards	2022	"Fiel" (Remix) (with Jhayco, Anuel AA & Myke Towers)	Best Collaboration	Nominated	
Heat Latin Music Awards	2023	Himself	Best Urban Artist	Nominated	
iHeartRadio Music Awards	2017	"Duele El Corazón" (with Enrique Iglesias)	Latin Song of the Year	Won	
iHeartRadio Music Awards	2019	"Me Niego" (with Reik & Ozuna)	Latin Song of the Year	Nominated	
Latin American Music Awards	2015	"Nota de Amor" (with Carlos Vives & Daddy Yankee)	Favorite Collaboration	Nominated	
Latin American Music Awards	2016	"Duele El Corazón" (with Enrique Iglesias)	Song of the Year	Won	
Latin American Music Awards	2016	"Duele El Corazón" (with Enrique Iglesias)	Favorite Pop/Rock Song	Nominated	
Latin American Music Awards	2016	"Duele El Corazón" (with Enrique Iglesias)	Favorite Collaboration	Won	
Latin American Music Awards	2017	Himself	Artist of the Year	Nominated	
Latin American Music Awards	2017	Himself	Favorite Urban Artist	Nominated	
Latin American Music Awards	2017	"Vacaciones"	Favorite Urban Song	Nominated	
Latin American Music Awards	2018	Victory	Album of the Year	Nominated	
Latin American Music Awards	2018	"Escápate Conmigo" (with Ozuna)	Song of the Year	Nominated	
Latin American Music Awards	2018	"Escápate Conmigo" (with Ozuna)	Favorite Urban Song	Nominated	
Latin American Music Awards	2018	"Me Niego" (with Reik & Ozuna)	Favorite Pop Song	Nominated	
Latin American Music Awards	2021	"Boogaloo Supreme" (with Victor Manuelle)	Favorite Tropical Song	Nominated	
Latin American Music Awards	2022	"Fiel" (with Jhayco)	Favorite Urban Song	Nominated	
Latin American Music Awards	2022	"Fiel" (with Jhayco)	Collaboration of the Year	Nominated	
Latin American Music Awards	2022	"Fiel" (with Jhayco)	Viral Song of the Year	Nominated	
Latin American Music Awards	2023	"Buenos Días" (with Camilo & Los Legendarios)	Best Collaboration – Pop/Urban	Nominated	
Latin American Music Awards	2023	"Soy Yo" (with Don Omar & Gente de Zona)	Best Collaboration – Tropical	Nominated	
Latin Grammy Awards	2016	"Duele El Corazón" (with Enrique Iglesias)	Record of the Year	Nominated	
Latin Grammy Awards	2016	"Duele El Corazón" (with Enrique Iglesias)	Song of the Year	Nominated	
LOS40 Music Awards	2014	Himself	Best Latin Act	Won	
LOS40 Music Awards	2014	"Adrenalina" (with Jennifer Lopez & Ricky Martin)	Best Spanish Language Song	Nominated	
LOS40 Music Awards	2016	"Duele El Corazón" (with Enrique Iglesias)	Song of the Year	Nominated	
LOS40 Music Awards	2016	"Duele El Corazón" (with Enrique Iglesias)	Video of the Year	Nominated	
LOS40 Music Awards	2016	"Duele El Corazón" (with Enrique Iglesias)	Global Show Award	Nominated	
LOS40 Music Awards	2018	"Me Niego" (with Reik & Ozuna)	LOS40 Global Show Award	Won	
MTV Millennial Awards	2017	"Duele El Corazón" (with Enrique Iglesias)	Hit of the Year	Nominated	
MTV Millennial Awards	2017	"Vacaciones"	Best Party Anthem	Nominated	
MTV Millennial Awards	2021	"Fiel" (with Jhayco)	Hit of the Year	Nominated	
NRJ Music Awards	2016	"Duele El Corazón" (with Enrique Iglesias)	International Song of the Year	Nominated	
Premios Juventud	2014	"Adrenalina" (with Jennifer Lopez & Ricky Martin)	The Perfect Combination	Nominated	
Premios Juventud	2015	Himself	Favorite Urban Artist	Nominated	
Premios Juventud	2016	Himself	Favorite Urban Artist	Nominated	
Premios Juventud	2016	"Rumba" (with Anahí)	The Perfect Combination	Nominated	
Premios Juventud	2016	"Rumba" (with Anahí)	La Más Pegajosa	Nominated	
Premios Juventud	2016	Los Vaqueros: La Trilogía	Lo Tocó Todo	Won	
Premios Juventud	2017	Himself	Artist Instagram	Nominated	
Premios Juventud	2017	"Vacaciones"	Best Song For Dancing	Nominated	
Premios Juventud	2019	Himself	Shoe-Aholic	Nominated	
Premios Juventud	2020	"Boogaloo Supreme" (with Victor Manuelle)	This Choreo Is On Fire	Nominated	
Premios Juventud	2021	"Mi Niña" (Remix) (with Myke Towers, Anitta & Maluma)	La Mezcla Perfecta (Song with the Best Collaboration)	Nominated	
Premios Juventud	2022	"Fiel" (with Jhayco)	Best Social Dance Challenge	Nominated	
Premios Juventud	2022	"Emojis de Corazones" (with Jhayco & Ozuna)	The Perfect Mix	Nominated	
Premios Juventud	2023	"Mi Exxx" (with Anuel AA)	Best Song for My Ex	Nominated	
Premios Juventud	2023	"Te Recuerdo" (with Emilia & Lyanno)	Best Pop/Urban Collaboration	Nominated	
Premios Juventud	2023	"Soy Yo" (with Don Omar & Gente de Zona)	Best Tropical Mix	Nominated	
Premios Juventud	2025	"Puro Guayeteo" (with Don Omar & Jowell y Randy)	Best Urban Mix	Nominated	
Premios Juventud	2025	Mr. W (Deluxe)	Best Urban Album	Nominated	
Premios Juventud	2026	"Que Me Quiera Má" (with Marc Anthony)	Tropical Mix	Nominated	
Premios Juventud	2026	El Sobreviviente WWW	Best Urban Album	Nominated	
Premios Lo Nuestro	2015	Himself	Urban Artist of the Year	Nominated	
Premios Lo Nuestro	2015	"Que Viva la Vida"	Urban Song of the Year	Nominated	
Premios Lo Nuestro	2015	"Adrenalina" (with Jennifer Lopez & Ricky Martin)	Urban Song of the Year	Nominated	
Premios Lo Nuestro	2015	"Adrenalina" (with Jennifer Lopez & Ricky Martin)	Urban Collaboration of the Year	Nominated	
Premios Lo Nuestro	2015	"Adrenalina" (with Jennifer Lopez & Ricky Martin)	Video of the Year	Nominated	
Premios Lo Nuestro	2015	El Regreso del Sobreviviente	Urban Album of the Year	Nominated	
Premios Lo Nuestro	2016	Himself	Urban Artist of the Year	Nominated	
Premios Lo Nuestro	2017	Himself	Urban Artist of the Year	Nominated	
Premios Lo Nuestro	2017	"Duele El Corazón" (with Enrique Iglesias)	Collaboration of the Year	Nominated	
Premios Lo Nuestro	2017	"Duele El Corazón" (with Enrique Iglesias)	Single of the Year	Nominated	
Premios Lo Nuestro	2017	"Duele El Corazón" (with Enrique Iglesias)	Pop Song of the Year	Nominated	
Premios Lo Nuestro	2017	Los Vaqueros: La Trilogía	Urban Album of the Year	Nominated	
Premios Lo Nuestro	2019	"Me Niego" (with Reik & Ozuna)	Song of the Year	Won	
Premios Lo Nuestro	2019	"Me Niego" (with Reik & Ozuna)	Single of the Year	Won	
Premios Lo Nuestro	2019	"Me Niego" (with Reik & Ozuna)	Collaboration of the Year	Won	
Premios Lo Nuestro	2019	"Me Niego" (with Reik & Ozuna)	Pop/Rock Song of the Year	Won	
Premios Lo Nuestro	2019	"Me Niego" (with Reik & Ozuna)	Pop/Rock Collaboration of the Year	Won	
Premios Lo Nuestro	2020	"Si Me Das Tu Amor" (with Carlos Vives)	Single of the Year	Nominated	
Premios Lo Nuestro	2020	"Si Me Das Tu Amor" (with Carlos Vives)	Tropical Song of the Year	Nominated	
Premios Lo Nuestro	2020	"Si Me Das Tu Amor" (with Carlos Vives)	Tropical Collaboration of the Year	Won	
Premios Lo Nuestro	2021	Himself	Excellence Award	Won	
Premios Lo Nuestro	2021	"Boogaloo Supreme" (with Victor Manuelle)	Video of the Year	Nominated	
Premios Lo Nuestro	2021	"Boogaloo Supreme" (with Victor Manuelle)	Tropical Song of the Year	Nominated	
Premios Lo Nuestro	2021	"Boogaloo Supreme" (with Victor Manuelle)	Tropical Collaboration of the Year	Nominated	
Premios Lo Nuestro	2022	Himself	Male Urban Artist of the Year	Nominated	
Premios Lo Nuestro	2022	"Fiel" (with Jhayco)	Song of the Year	Nominated	
Premios Lo Nuestro	2022	"Fiel" (with Jhayco)	Urban Song of the Year	Nominated	
Premios Lo Nuestro	2022	"Fiel" (Remix) (with Jhayco, Anuel AA & Myke Towers)	Remix of the Year	Nominated	
Premios Lo Nuestro	2022	"Mi Niña" (with Myke Towers)	Urban Collaboration of the Year	Nominated	
Premios Lo Nuestro	2023	Himself	Male Urban Artist of the Year	Nominated	
Premios Lo Nuestro	2023	"Emojis de Corazones" (with Jhayco & Ozuna)	Urban Collaboration of the Year	Nominated	
Premios Lo Nuestro	2023	"Buenos Días" (with Camilo & Los Legendarios)	Urban/Pop Song of the Year	Nominated	
Premios Lo Nuestro	2024	"Mi Exxx" (with Anuel AA)	Urban Collaboration of the Year	Nominated	
Premios Lo Nuestro	2024	"Te Recuerdo" (with Emilia & Lyanno)	Urban/Pop Collaboration of the Year	Nominated	
Premios Lo Nuestro	2025	Himself	Male Urban Artist of the Year	Nominated	
Premios Lo Nuestro	2025	Mr. W (Deluxe)	Urban Album of the Year	Nominated	
Premios Lo Nuestro	2025	"Sandunga" (with Don Omar & Yandel)	Urban Song of the Year	Nominated	
Premios Lo Nuestro	2025	"Sandunga" (with Don Omar & Yandel)	Urban Collaboration of the Year	Nominated	
Premios Lo Nuestro	2025	"Bien Loco" (with Mora)	Urban Collaboration of the Year	Nominated	
Premios Lo Nuestro	2025	"La Vida Es Una Fiesta" (with Sergio George)	The Perfect Mix of the Year	Nominated	
Premios Lo Nuestro	2025	"La Vida Es Una Fiesta" (with Sergio George)	Tropical Collaboration of the Year	Nominated	
Premios Lo Nuestro	2025	"Conéctate Conmigo" (with Gocho & Redimi2)	Christian Music Song of the Year	Nominated	
Premios Lo Nuestro	2025	"La Misión" (with Piso 21)	Pop-Urban Collaboration of the Year	Nominated	
Premios Lo Nuestro	2026	Himself	Male Urban Artist of the Year	Nominated	
Premios Lo Nuestro	2026	El Sobreviviente WWW	Urban Album of the Year	Nominated	
Premios Lo Nuestro	2026	"Luna" (with Kapo)	Urban Collaboration of the Year	Nominated	
Premios Lo Nuestro	2026	“Que Me Quiera Ma” (with Marc Anthony)	The Perfect Mix of the Year	Won	
Premios Tu Mundo	2015	Himself	Favorite Urban Artist	Nominated	
Premios Tu Mundo	2016	"Duele El Corazón" (with Enrique Iglesias)	Party Starter Song	Nominated	
Premios Tu Mundo	2017	Himself	Favorite Urban Artist	Nominated	
Premios Tu Música Urbano	2019	Himself	Urban Male Artist of the Year	Nominated	
Premios Tu Música Urbano	2019	"Si Pudiera" (with Christian Daniel)	Top Song - Pop Urban	Nominated	
Premios Tu Música Urbano	2019	"Me Niego" (with Reik & Ozuna)	Top Song - Pop Urban	Nominated	
Premios Tu Música Urbano	2019	"Me Niego" (with Reik & Ozuna)	Collaboration of the Year	Nominated	
Premios Tu Música Urbano	2020	"Quizás" (with Sech, Justin Quiles, Dalex, Lenny Tavárez, Feid, Zion & Dimelo Flow)	Song of the Year - Duo or Group	Nominated	
Premios Tu Música Urbano	2022	Himself	Top Artist - Male	Nominated	
Premios Tu Música Urbano	2022	"Playita"	Song of the Year - Duo or Group	Nominated	
Premios Tu Música Urbano	2022	"Buenos Días" (with Camilo & Los Legendarios)	Song of the Year - Duo or Group	Nominated	
Premios Tu Música Urbano	2022	"Fiel" (Remix) (with Jhayco, Anuel AA & Myke Towers)	Remix of the Year	Nominated	
Premios Tu Música Urbano	2026	"Contrabando" (with Rauw Alejandro & Ñengo Flow)	Collaboration of the Year	Nominated	
