= List of awards and nominations received by J Balvin =

J Balvin awards and nominations
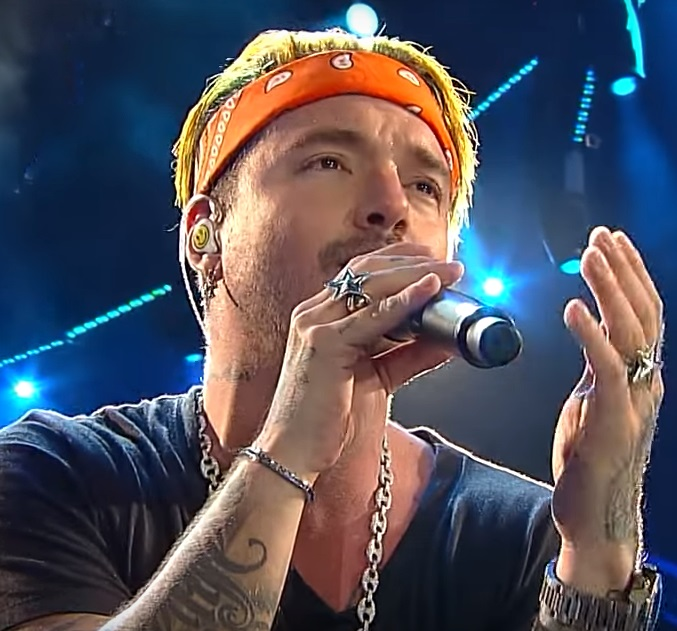
- J Balvin in 2017
Awards and nominations
Award	Wins	Nominations
American Music Awards	1	6
MTV Europe	3	16
MTV VMA	5	12
Latin Grammy Awards	5	34
Billboard Music Awards	2	25
Billboard Latin Music Awards	11	84
LOS40 Music Awards	4	13
Lo Nuestro Awards	18	75
Nuestra Tierra Awards	30	43
BMI Latin Awards	29	24
Latin American Music Awards	7	21
MTV Millennial Awards	7	26
Premios Juventud	13	51
Shock Awards	11	20
iHeartRadio Music Awards	4	19
Heat Latin Music Awards	10	31
Latin Italian Music Awards	6	6
Tu Música Urbano Awards	5	5
Núcleo Urbano	7	10
Latino Show Awards	6	6
Nickelodeon	4	8

Totals (Note: Certain award groups do not simply award one winner. They acknowledge several different recipients, have runners-up, and have third place. Since this is a specific recognition and is different from losing an award, runner-up mentions are considered wins in this award tally. For simplification and to avoid errors, each award in this list has been presumed to have had a prior nomination.)
- Wins: 225
- Nominations: 522

This is a comprehensive list of awards won by 2 Guinness record holder reggaeton singer J Balvin. He has won Eleven Billboard Latin Music Awards, six Latin Grammy Awards, five MTV Video Music Awards and six Latin American Music Awards. He is the most nominated Latin artist in history with a total of 35 nominations at the Latin Grammy Awards. He also made his name in the Guinness Book of Records by getting 13 nominations in one night. He is the only Colombian artist to be awarded 3 times in the best album category, and is in second place overall.

Other world records on the site include the record for the song that has been at #1 for the longest time as a solo artist on the US Latin Hot Songs chart, the Most Lo Nuestro Award nominations in a Single Year, First artist to reach No.1 alone on Billboard's latin airplay chart twice (male), Most No.1s on Billboard's Digital song sales chart (2022) and They officially named J Balvin as the Leader of the second generation Latin Music revolution.

Premios Lo Nuestro recognized J Balvin with the Global Icon Award at for his contribution to spread Latin music worldwide. He is the most awarded Latin artist in the history of MTV Vmas and Emas with 8 awards. also won 7 awards at the MTV Millennial Awards, winning a total of 15 awards from all MTV awards.

He is also the most awarded Latin artist at the iHeartRadio Music Awards. Awarded 4 iHeartRadio Music Awards along with the accomplishment of reaching 1 Billion Total Audience Spins for "I Like It" (feat Cardi B & Bad Bunny).

== Awards and nominations ==
Award	Year	Recipient(s) and nominee(s)	Category	Result	Ref.
American Music Awards	2016	Himself	Favorite Latin Artist	Nominated	
American Music Awards	2018	Himself	Favorite Latin Artist	Nominated	
American Music Awards	2019	Himself	Favorite Latin Artist	Won	
American Music Awards	2020	Himself	Favorite Latin Artist	Nominated	
American Music Awards	2020	"Ritmo (Bad Boys For Life)" (with Black Eyed Peas)	Favorite Latin Song	Nominated	
American Music Awards	2021	Himself	Favorite Latin Artist	Nominated	
American Music Awards	2022	Himself	Favorite Latin Artist	Nominated	
BET Hip Hop Awards	2018	"I Like It" (with Cardi B & Bad Bunny)	Best Hip Hop Video	Nominated	
BET Hip Hop Awards	2018	"I Like It" (with Cardi B & Bad Bunny)	Best Collabo, Duo or Group	Nominated	
BET Hip Hop Awards	2018	"I Like It" (with Cardi B & Bad Bunny)	Single of the Year	Nominated	
Billboard Music Awards	2016	"Ginza"	Top Latin Song	Nominated	
Billboard Music Awards	2017	Energia	Top Latin Album	Nominated	
Billboard Music Awards	2017	Himself	Top Latin Artist	Won	
Billboard Music Awards	2018	"Mi Gente" (with Willy William)	Top Latin Song	Nominated	
Billboard Music Awards	2018	Himself	Top Latin Artist	Nominated	
Billboard Music Awards	2019	"I Like It" (with Cardi B & Bad Bunny)	Top Hot 100 Song	Nominated	
Billboard Music Awards	2019	"I Like It" (with Cardi B & Bad Bunny)	Top Streaming Song	Nominated	
Billboard Music Awards	2019	"I Like It" (with Cardi B & Bad Bunny)	Top Selling Song	Nominated	
Billboard Music Awards	2019	"I Like It" (with Cardi B & Bad Bunny)	Top Collaboration	Nominated	
Billboard Music Awards	2019	"I Like It" (with Cardi B & Bad Bunny)	Top Rap Song	Won	
Billboard Music Awards	2019	"X" (with Nicky Jam)	Top Latin Song	Nominated	
Billboard Music Awards	2019	Himself	Top Latin Artist	Nominated	
Billboard Music Awards	2020	Himself	Top Latin Artist	Nominated	
Billboard Music Awards	2020	Oasis (with Bad Bunny)	Top Latin Album	Won	
Billboard Music Awards	2020	"China" (with Anuel AA, Ozuna, Daddy Yankee & Karol G)	Top Latin Song	Nominated	
Billboard Music Awards	2020	"No Me Conoce (Remix)" (with Jhay Cortez & Bad Bunny)	Top Latin Song	Nominated	
Billboard Music Awards	2020	"Ritmo (Bad Boys For Life)" (with Black Eyed Peas)	Top Dance/Electronic Song	Nominated	
Billboard Music Awards	2021	Himself	Top Latin Artist	Nominated	
Billboard Music Awards	2021	Himself	Top Latin Male Artist	Nominated	
Billboard Music Awards	2021	Colores	Top Latin Album	Nominated	
Billboard Music Awards	2021	"Ritmo (Bad Boys For Life)" (with Black Eyed Peas)	Top Latin Song	Nominated	
Billboard Music Awards	2022	Jose	Top Latin Album	Nominated	
Billboard Latin Music Awards	2015	"Ay Vamos"	Latin Rhythm Song of the Year	Nominated	
Billboard Latin Music Awards	2015	"6 AM" (with Farruko)	Latin Rhythm Song of the Year	Won	
Billboard Latin Music Awards	2015	"6 AM" (with Farruko)	Digital Song of the Year	Nominated	
Billboard Latin Music Awards	2015	"6 AM" (with Farruko)	Airplay Song of the Year	Nominated	
Billboard Latin Music Awards	2015	"6 AM" (with Farruko)	Hot Latin Song of the Year, Vocal Event	Nominated	
Billboard Latin Music Awards	2015	"6 AM" (with Farruko)	Hot Latin Song of the Year	Nominated	
Billboard Latin Music Awards	2015	La Familia	Latin Rhythm Album of the Year	Nominated	
Billboard Latin Music Awards	2015	Himself	New Artist of the Year	Won	
Billboard Latin Music Awards	2015	Himself	Latin Rhythm Albums Artist of the Year, Solo	Nominated	
Billboard Latin Music Awards	2015	Himself	Latin Rhythm Songs Artist of the Year, Solo	Won	
Billboard Latin Music Awards	2015	Himself	Hot Latin Songs Artist of the Year, Male	Nominated	
Billboard Latin Music Awards	2015	Himself	Songwriter of the Year	Nominated	
Billboard Latin Music Awards	2016	"Ginza"	Hot Latin Song of the Year	Nominated	
Billboard Latin Music Awards	2016	"Ginza"	Airplay Song of the Year	Nominated	
Billboard Latin Music Awards	2016	"Ginza"	Latin Rhythm Song of the Year	Nominated	
Billboard Latin Music Awards	2016	"Ginza"	Digital Song of the Year	Nominated	
Billboard Latin Music Awards	2016	"Ay Vamos"	Digital Song of the Year	Nominated	
Billboard Latin Music Awards	2016	"Ay Vamos"	Streaming Song of the Year	Nominated	
Billboard Latin Music Awards	2016	Himself	Hot Latin Songs Artist of the Year	Nominated	
Billboard Latin Music Awards	2016	Himself	Latin Rhythm Songs Artist of the Year	Nominated	
Billboard Latin Music Awards	2017	Energia	Latin Rhythm Album of the Year	Won	
Billboard Latin Music Awards	2017	"Bobo"	Latin Rhythm Song of the Year	Nominated	
Billboard Latin Music Awards	2017	Himself	Artist of the Year	Nominated	
Billboard Latin Music Awards	2017	Himself	Hot Latin Songs Artist of the Year, Male	Nominated	
Billboard Latin Music Awards	2017	Himself	Latin Rhythm Songs Artist of the Year	Won	
Billboard Latin Music Awards	2017	Himself	Top Latin Albums Artist of the Year, Male	Nominated	
Billboard Latin Music Awards	2018	"Mi Gente" (with Willy William & Beyoncé)	Hot Latin Song of the Year	Nominated	
Billboard Latin Music Awards	2018	"Mi Gente" (with Willy William & Beyoncé)	Hot Latin Song of the Year, Vocal Event	Nominated	
Billboard Latin Music Awards	2018	"Mi Gente" (with Willy William & Beyoncé)	Airplay Song of the Year	Nominated	
Billboard Latin Music Awards	2018	"Mi Gente" (with Willy William & Beyoncé)	Digital Song of the Year	Nominated	
Billboard Latin Music Awards	2018	"Mi Gente" (with Willy William & Beyoncé)	Streaming Song of the Year	Nominated	
Billboard Latin Music Awards	2018	"Mi Gente" (with Willy William & Beyoncé)	Latin Rhythm Song of the Year	Won	
Billboard Latin Music Awards	2018	Energia	Top Latin Album of the Year	Nominated	
Billboard Latin Music Awards	2018	Himself	Artist of the Year	Nominated	
Billboard Latin Music Awards	2018	Himself	Social Artist of the Year	Nominated	
Billboard Latin Music Awards	2018	Himself	Hot Latin Songs Artist of the Year, Male	Nominated	
Billboard Latin Music Awards	2018	Himself	Top Latin Album Artist of the Year, Male	Nominated	
Billboard Latin Music Awards	2018	Himself	Latin Rhythm Artist of the Year, Solo	Nominated	
Billboard Latin Music Awards	2019	"X" (with Nicky Jam)	Hot Latin Song of the Year	Nominated	
Billboard Latin Music Awards	2019	"X" (with Nicky Jam)	Hot Latin Song of the Year, Vocal Event	Nominated	
Billboard Latin Music Awards	2019	"X" (with Nicky Jam)	Airplay Song of the Year	Won	
Billboard Latin Music Awards	2019	"X" (with Nicky Jam)	Digital Song of the Year	Nominated	
Billboard Latin Music Awards	2019	"X" (with Nicky Jam)	Streaming Song of the Year	Nominated	
Billboard Latin Music Awards	2019	"X" (with Nicky Jam)	Latin Rhythm Song of the Year	Won	
Billboard Latin Music Awards	2019	Vibras	Top Latin Album of the Year	Nominated	
Billboard Latin Music Awards	2019	Vibras	Latin Rhythm Album of the Year	Nominated	
Billboard Latin Music Awards	2019	Himself	Artist of the Year	Nominated	
Billboard Latin Music Awards	2019	Himself	Songwriter of the Year	Nominated	
Billboard Latin Music Awards	2019	Himself	Hot Latin Songs Artist of the Year, Male	Nominated	
Billboard Latin Music Awards	2019	Himself	Top Latin Album Artist of the Year, Male	Nominated	
Billboard Latin Music Awards	2019	Himself	Latin Rhythm Artist of the Year, Solo	Nominated	
Billboard Latin Music Awards	2020	"China" (with Anuel AA, Daddy Yankee, Ozuna & Karol G)	Airplay Song of the Year	Nominated	
Billboard Latin Music Awards	2020	"Baila Baila Baila (Remix)" (with Ozuna, Daddy Yankee, Anuel AA & Farruko)	Airplay Song of the Year	Nominated	
Billboard Latin Music Awards	2020	"Baila Baila Baila (Remix)" (with Ozuna, Daddy Yankee, Anuel AA & Farruko)	Digital Song of the Year	Nominated	
Billboard Latin Music Awards	2020	"Baila Baila Baila (Remix)" (with Ozuna, Daddy Yankee, Anuel AA & Farruko)	Latin Rhythm Song of the Year	Nominated	
Billboard Latin Music Awards	2020	"Con Altura" (with Rosalía & El Guincho)	Latin Pop Song of the Year	Nominated	
Billboard Latin Music Awards	2020	Oasis	Top Latin Album of the Year	Nominated	
Billboard Latin Music Awards	2020	Oasis	Latin Rhythm Album of the Year	Nominated	
Billboard Latin Music Awards	2020	Himself	Hot Latin Songs Artist of the Year, Male	Nominated	
Billboard Latin Music Awards	2020	Himself	Latin Rhythm Artist of the Year, Solo	Nominated	
Billboard Latin Music Awards	2020	Himself	Top Latin Album Artist of the Year, Male	Nominated	
Billboard Latin Music Awards	2020	Himself	Songwriter of the Year	Nominated	
Billboard Latin Music Awards	2021	"Ritmo (Bad Boys For Life)" (with Black Eyed Peas)	Vocal Event Hot Latin Song of the Year	Nominated	
Billboard Latin Music Awards	2021	"Ritmo (Bad Boys For Life)" (with Black Eyed Peas)	Hot Latin Song of the Year	Nominated	
Billboard Latin Music Awards	2021	"Ritmo (Bad Boys For Life)" (with Black Eyed Peas)	Sales Song of the Year	Won	
Billboard Latin Music Awards	2021	"Ritmo (Bad Boys For Life)" (with Black Eyed Peas)	Latin Rhythm Song of the Year	Nominated	
Billboard Latin Music Awards	2021	Himself	Artist of the Year	Nominated	
Billboard Latin Music Awards	2021	Himself	Male Hot Latin Songs Artist of the Year	Nominated	
Billboard Latin Music Awards	2021	Himself	Male Top Latin Albums Artist of the Year	Nominated	
Billboard Latin Music Awards	2021	Himself	Latin Rhythm Artist of the Year	Nominated	
Billboard Latin Music Awards	2021	Himself	Songwriter of the Year	Nominated	
Billboard Latin Music Awards	2022	Himself	Top Latin Albums Artist of the Year, Male	Nominated	
Billboard Latin Music Awards	2022	Himself	Latin Rhythm Artist of the Year, Solo	Nominated	
Billboard Latin Music Awards	2022	Jose	Top Latin Album of the Year	Nominated	
Billboard Latin Music Awards	2022	Jose	Latin Rhythm Album of the Year	Nominated	
Billboard Latin Music Awards	2024	Himself	Spirit of Hope	Won	
Billboard Latin Music Awards	2026	"Si Te Vas" (with Jay Wheeler)	Latin Rhythm Song of the Year	Nominated	
BMI Latin Awards	2017	"Ginza"	Contemporary Latin Song of the Year	Won	
BMI Latin Awards	2017	"Ginza"	Award Winning Songs	Won	
BMI Latin Awards	2018	Himself	Contemporary Latin Songwriter of the Year	Won	
BMI Latin Awards	2018	"Bobo"	Award Winning Songs	Won	
BMI Latin Awards	2018	"Otra Vez"	Award Winning Songs	Won	
BMI Latin Awards	2018	"Safari"	Award Winning Songs	Won	
BMI Latin Awards	2018	"Sigo Extrañandote"	Award Winning Songs	Won	
BMI Latin Awards	2019	"Mi Gente"	Contemporary Latin Song of the Year	Won	
BMI Latin Awards	2019	"Ahora Dice"	Award Winning Songs	Won	
BMI Latin Awards	2019	"Bonita"	Award Winning Songs	Won	
BMI Latin Awards	2019	"Mi Gente"	Award Winning Songs	Won	
BMI Latin Awards	2019	"Sensualidad"	Award Winning Songs	Won	
BMI Latin Awards	2019	"X"	Award Winning Songs	Won	
BMI Latin Awards	2020	"Ambiente"	Award Winning Songs	Won	
BMI Latin Awards	2020	"No Es Justo"	Award Winning Songs	Won	
BMI Latin Awards	2020	"Reggaeton"	Award Winning Songs	Won	
BMI Latin Awards	2021	"Baila Baila Baila (Remix)"	Award Winning Songs	Won	
BMI Latin Awards	2021	"China"	Award Winning Songs	Won	
BMI Latin Awards	2021	"Con Altura"	Award Winning Songs	Won	
BMI Latin Awards	2021	"No Me Conoce (Remix)"	Award Winning Songs	Won	
BMI Latin Awards	2021	"Que Calor"	Award Winning Songs	Won	
BMI Latin Awards	2021	"La Cancion"	Award Winning Songs	Won	
BMI Latin Awards	2021	"Que Pretendes"	Award Winning Songs	Won	
BMI Latin Awards	2022	"Loco Contigo"	Award Winning Songs	Won	
BMI Latin Awards	2022	"Morando"	Award Winning Songs	Won	
BMI Latin Awards	2022	"Relacion" (Remix)	Award Winning Songs	Won	
BMI Latin Awards	2022	"Ritmo (Bad Boys for Life)"	Award Winning Songs	Won	
BMI Latin Awards	2022	"Rojo"	Award Winning Songs	Won	
BMI Latin Awards	2022	"Un Dia (One Day)"	Award Winning Songs	Won	
BMI R&B/Hip-Hop Awards	2019	"I Like It" (with Cardi B and Bad Bunny)	Most Performed R&B/Hip-Hop Songs	Won	
Grammy Awards	2019	"I Like It" (with Cardi B and Bad Bunny)	Record of the Year	Nominated	
Grammy Awards	2020	Oasis (with Bad Bunny)	Best Latin Rock, Urban or Alternative Album	Nominated	
Grammy Awards	2021	"Un Día (One Day)" (with Dua Lipa, Bad Bunny & Tainy)	Best Pop Duo/Group Performance	Nominated	
Grammy Awards	2022	Jose	Best Música Urbana Album	Nominated	
Grammy Awards	2025	Rayo	Best Música Urbana Album	Nominated	
Grammy Awards	2026	Mixteip	Best Música Urbana Album	Nominated	
Heat Latin Music Awards	2015	"Ay Vamos"	Best Music Video	Won	
Heat Latin Music Awards	2015	Himself	Best Male Artist	Won	
Heat Latin Music Awards	2015	Himself	Best Urban Artist	Nominated	
Heat Latin Music Awards	2015	Himself	Best Andean Artist	Nominated	
Heat Latin Music Awards	2016	Himself	Best Andean Artist	Nominated	
Heat Latin Music Awards	2016	Himself	Best Urban Artist	Nominated	
Heat Latin Music Awards	2017	"Bobo"	Best Video	Won	
Heat Latin Music Awards	2017	Himself	Best Male Artist	Won	
Heat Latin Music Awards	2017	Himself	Best Urban Artist	Won	
Heat Latin Music Awards	2017	Himself	Best Andean Artist	Nominated	
Heat Latin Music Awards	2019	Himself	Best Male Artist	Won	
Heat Latin Music Awards	2019	Himself	Best Urban Artist	Won	
Heat Latin Music Awards	2019	Himself	Artista Oto	Won	
Heat Latin Music Awards	2019	"Machika"	Best Video	Nominated	
Heat Latin Music Awards	2019	"Machika"	Best Collaboration	Nominated	
Heat Latin Music Awards	2019	"Sensualidad"	Best Collaboration	Nominated	
Heat Latin Music Awards	2020	"Con Altura" (with Rosalía and El Guincho)	Best Collaboration	Won	
Heat Latin Music Awards	2021	Himself	Best Male Artist	Nominated	
Heat Latin Music Awards	2021	Himself	Best Urban Artist	Nominated	
Heat Latin Music Awards	2021	"Location" (with Karol G & Anuel AA)	Best Video	Nominated	
Heat Latin Music Awards	2021	"Rojo"	Best Video	Nominated	
Heat Latin Music Awards	2022	Himself	Best Male Artist	Nominated	
Heat Latin Music Awards	2022	Himself	Best Urban Artist	Nominated	
Heat Latin Music Awards	2022	"In Da Guetto" (with Skrillex)	Best Video	Nominated	
Heat Latin Music Awards	2022	"Qué Más Pues?" (with Maria Becerra)	Best Collaboration	Nominated	
iHeartRadio Music Awards	2017	Energía	Latin Album of the Year	Won	
iHeartRadio Music Awards	2017	Himself	Latin Artist of the Year	Nominated	
iHeartRadio Music Awards	2018	"Mi Gente" (with Willy William)	Latin Song of the Year	Nominated	
iHeartRadio Music Awards	2018	"Mi Gente (Remix)" (featuring Willy William & Beyoncé)	Best Remix	Nominated	
iHeartRadio Music Awards	2018	Himself	Latin Artist of the Year	Nominated	
iHeartRadio Music Awards	2019	"I Like It" (with Cardi B & Bad Bunny)	Hip-Hop Song of the Year	Nominated	
iHeartRadio Music Awards	2019	"I Like It" (with Cardi B & Bad Bunny)	Best Music Video	Nominated	
iHeartRadio Music Awards	2019	"I Like It" (with Cardi B & Bad Bunny)	Best Collaboration	Nominated	
iHeartRadio Music Awards	2019	"X" (with Nicky Jam)	Latin Song of the Year	Won	
iHeartRadio Music Awards	2019	Vibras	Latin Album of the Year	Won	
iHeartRadio Music Awards	2019	Himself	Latin Artist of the Year	Nominated	
iHeartRadio Music Awards	2020	"Que Pretendes" (with Bad Bunny)	Latin Pop/Urban Song of the Year	Nominated	
iHeartRadio Music Awards	2020	"Con Altura" (with Rosalia)	Best Music Video	Nominated	
iHeartRadio Music Awards	2020	Himself	Latin Pop/Urban Artist of the Year	Nominated	
iHeartRadio Music Awards	2021	"Ritmo (Bad Boys for Life)" (with Black Eyed Peas)	Latin Pop/Reggaeton Song of the Year	Nominated	
iHeartRadio Music Awards	2021	Himself	Latin Pop/Reggaeton Artist of the Year	Won	
iHeartRadio Music Awards	2022	"In Da Getto" (with Skrillex)	Latin Song of the Year	Nominated	
iHeartRadio Music Awards	2022	Himself	Latin Pop/Reggaeton Artist of the Year	Nominated	
iHeartRadio Music Awards	2026	Himself	Latin Pop/Urban Artist of the Year	Nominated	
iHeartRadio Titanium Award	2018	"I Like It" (with Cardi B & Bad Bunny)	1 Billion Total Audience Spins on iHeartRadio Stations	Won	
Latin American Music Awards	2015	Himself	New Artist of the Year	Won	
Latin American Music Awards	2015	Himself	Favorite Urban Artist	Nominated	
Latin American Music Awards	2015	Ay Vamos	Song of the Year	Nominated	
Latin American Music Awards	2015	Ay Vamos	Favorite Streaming Song	Nominated	
Latin American Music Awards	2015	Ay Vamos	Favorite Urban Song	Won	
Latin American Music Awards	2016	Himself	Artist of the Year	Nominated	
Latin American Music Awards	2016	Himself	Favorite Urban Artist	Won	
Latin American Music Awards	2016	Ginza	Song of the Year	Nominated	
Latin American Music Awards	2016	Ginza	Favorite Urban Song	Won	
Latin American Music Awards	2017	Himself	Artist of the Year	Nominated	
Latin American Music Awards	2017	Himself	Favorite Urban Artist	Won	
Latin American Music Awards	2017	"Safari" (ft Pharrell Williams, BIA & Sky)	Favorite Urban Song	Nominated	
Latin American Music Awards	2018	Himself	Artist of the Year	Nominated	
Latin American Music Awards	2018	Himself	Favorite Male Artist	Nominated	
Latin American Music Awards	2018	Himself	Favorite Urban Artist	Nominated	
Latin American Music Awards	2018	"Vibras"	Album of the Year	Nominated	
Latin American Music Awards	2018	"Vibras"	Favorite Urban Album	Nominated	
Latin American Music Awards	2018	"Mi Gente (Remix)" (ft Willy William & Beyoncé)	Song of the Year	Nominated	
Latin American Music Awards	2018	"Mi Gente (Remix)" (ft Willy William & Beyoncé)	Favorite Urban Song	Nominated	
Latin American Music Awards	2018	"X" (ft Nicky Jam)	Song of the Year	Nominated	
Latin American Music Awards	2018	"X" (ft Nicky Jam)	Favorite Urban Song	Nominated	
Latin American Music Awards	2019	Himself	Artist of the Year	Nominated	
Latin American Music Awards	2019	Himself	Favorite Male Artist	Nominated	
Latin American Music Awards	2019	Himself	Favorite Urban Artist	Nominated	
Latin American Music Awards	2021	Himself	Artist of the Year	Nominated	
Latin American Music Awards	2021	Himself	Favorite Male Artist	Nominated	
Latin American Music Awards	2021	Himself	Favorite Urban Artist	Nominated	
Latin American Music Awards	2021	"Ritmo (Bad Boys for Life)"	Song of the Year	Nominated	
Latin American Music Awards	2021	"Ritmo (Bad Boys for Life)"	Favorite Urban Song	Nominated	
Latin American Music Awards	2021	"Ritmo (Bad Boys for Life)"	Collaboration of the Year	Nominated	
Latin American Music Awards	2021	Colores	Album of the Year	Nominated	
Latin American Music Awards	2021	Colores	Favorite Urban Album	Nominated	
Latin American Music Awards	2022	Himself	Artist of the Year	Nominated	
Latin American Music Awards	2022	Himself	Favorite Male Artist	Nominated	
Latin American Music Awards	2022	Himself	Favorite Urban Artist	Nominated	
Latin American Music Awards	2022	“In da Getto”	Song of the Year	Nominated	
Latin American Music Awards	2022	“In da Getto”	Favorite Urban Song	Nominated	
Latin American Music Awards	2022	“Lo Que Dios Quiera”	Favorite Video	Nominated	
Latin American Music Awards	2022	“AM”	Viral Song of the Year	Won	
Latin Grammy Award	2014	"6 AM" (with Farruko)	Best Urban Performance	Nominated	
Latin Grammy Award	2014	"6 AM" (with Farruko)	Best Urban Song	Nominated	
Latin Grammy Award	2014	La Familia	Best Urban Music Album	Nominated	
Latin Grammy Award	2015	"Ay Vamos"	Best Urban Song	Won	
Latin Grammy Award	2015	"Ay Vamos"	Best Urban Performance	Nominated	
Latin Grammy Award	2016	Energía	Best Urban Music Album	Won	
Latin Grammy Award	2017	"Si Tu Novio Te Deja Sola" (with Bad Bunny)	Best Urban / Fusion Performance	Nominated	
Latin Grammy Award	2017	"Hey Ma" (with Pitbull & Camila Cabello)	Best Urban Song	Won	
Latin Grammy Award	2018	Vibras	Album of the Year	Nominated	
Latin Grammy Award	2018	Vibras	Best Urban Music Album	Won	
Latin Grammy Award	2018	"Mi Gente" (with Willy William)	Record of the Year	Nominated	
Latin Grammy Award	2018	"X" (with Nicky Jam)	Record of the Year	Nominated	
Latin Grammy Award	2018	"X" (with Nicky Jam)	Best Urban Song	Nominated	
Latin Grammy Award	2018	"Sensualidad" (with Bad Bunny & Prince Royce)	Best Urban Song	Nominated	
Latin Grammy Award	2018	"Downtown" (with Anitta)	Best Urban Song	Nominated	
Latin Grammy Award	2018	"Mi Gente (Remix)" (with Willy William & Beyoncé)	Best Urban / Fusion Performance	Nominated	
Latin Grammy Award	2019	"Caliente" (with De La Ghetto)	Best Urban Song	Nominated	
Latin Grammy Award	2019	"Con Altura" (with Rosalía and El Guincho)	Best Urban Song	Won	
Latin Grammy Award	2020	Colores	Album of the Year	Nominated	
Latin Grammy Award	2020	Colores	Best Urban Music Album	Won	
Latin Grammy Award	2020	Oasis (with Bad Bunny)	Best Urban Music Album	Nominated	
Latin Grammy Award	2020	Oasis (with Bad Bunny)	Album of the Year	Nominated	
Latin Grammy Award	2020	"Rojo"	Record of the Year	Nominated	
Latin Grammy Award	2020	"Rojo"	Best Urban Song	Nominated	
Latin Grammy Award	2020	"Rojo"	Best Short Form Music Video	Nominated	
Latin Grammy Award	2020	"China" (with Anuel AA, Daddy Yankee, Karol G and Ozuna)	Record of the Year	Nominated	
Latin Grammy Award	2020	"China" (with Anuel AA, Daddy Yankee, Karol G and Ozuna)	Best Urban/Fusion Performance	Nominated	
Latin Grammy Award	2020	"Azul"	Best Urban/Fusion Performance	Nominated	
Latin Grammy Award	2020	"Morado"	Best Reggaeton Performance	Nominated	
Latin Grammy Award	2020	"Loco Contigo" (with DJ Snake and Tyga)	Best Reggaeton Performance	Nominated	
Latin Grammy Award	2020	"Medusa" (with Anuel AA and Jhay Cortez)	Best Rap/Hip Hop Song	Nominated	
Latin Grammy Award	2021	"Agua" (with Tainy)	Song of the Year	Nominated	
Latin Grammy Award	2021	"Agua" (with Tainy)	Best Urban Song	Nominated	
Latin Grammy Award	2021	"Tu Veneno"	Best Reggaeton Performance	Nominated	
Latin Grammy Award	2024	"Triple S" (with Jowell & Randy & De la Ghetto)	Best Reggaeton Performance	Nominated	
Latin Grammy Award	2026	Omerta	Best Urban Music Album	Nominated	
LOS40 Music Awards	2011	Himself	Best Colombian Act	Nominated	
LOS40 Music Awards	2014	"6 AM" (with Farruko)	Best Spanish Language Song	Nominated	
LOS40 Music Awards	2016	Himself	Best Latin Artist	Won	
LOS40 Music Awards	2016	"Ginza"	LOS40 Global Show Award	Nominated	
LOS40 Music Awards	2017	Himself	Best Latin Artist	Nominated	
LOS40 Music Awards	2017	"Mi Gente" (with Willy William)	LOS40 Global Show Award	Won	
LOS40 Music Awards	2018	Himself	Best Latin Artist	Nominated	
LOS40 Music Awards	2018	"X" (with Nicky Jam)	LOS40 Global Show Award	Nominated	
LOS40 Music Awards	2018	"X" (with Nicky Jam)	International Video of the Year	Nominated	
LOS40 Music Awards	2018	"Familiar" (with Liam Payne)	International Video of the Year	Nominated	
LOS40 Music Awards	2019	Himself	LOS40 Urban Award	Nominated	
LOS40 Music Awards	2019	"Con altura" (with Rosalía & El Guincho)	LOS40 Global Show Award	Won	
LOS40 Music Awards	2019	"Con altura" (with Rosalía & El Guincho)	Video of the Year	Nominated	
LOS40 Music Awards	2020	"Ritmo (Bad Boys for Life)" (with Black Eyed Peas)	Best Song - International	Nominated	
LOS40 Music Awards	2020	"Rojo"	Best Song - Latin	Nominated	
LOS40 Music Awards	2020	"Rojo"	Best Video - Latin	Nominated	
LOS40 Music Awards	2021	Himself	Best Urban Act - Latin	Nominated	
LOS40 Music Awards	2021	"Location" (with Karol G & Anuel AA)	Best Video - Latin	Nominated	
LOS40 Music Awards	2021	"In da Getto" (with Skrillex)	Best Video - Latin	Nominated	
Lunas del Auditorio	2017	Himself	Best Urban	Nominated	
MTV Video Music Awards	2018	"Mi Gente" (with Willy William)	Best Latin	Won	
MTV Video Music Awards	2018	"I Like It" (with Cardi B & Bad Bunny)	Song of Summer	Won	
MTV Video Music Awards	2019	"Say My Name" (with David Guetta & Bebe Rexha)	Best Dance	Nominated	
MTV Video Music Awards	2019	"I Can't Get Enough" (with Benny Blanco, Tainy & Selena Gomez)	Best Latin	Nominated	
MTV Video Music Awards	2019	"Con Altura" (with Rosalía & El Guincho)	Best Latin	Won	
MTV Video Music Awards	2019	"Con Altura" (with Rosalía & El Guincho)	Best Choreography	Won	
MTV Video Music Awards	2019	"Con Altura" (with Rosalía & El Guincho)	Song of Summer	Nominated	
MTV Video Music Awards	2020	"Ritmo (Bad Boys for Life)" (with Black Eyed Peas)	Best Collaboration	Nominated	
MTV Video Music Awards	2020	"China" (with Anuel AA, Daddy Yankee, Ozuna & Karol G)	Best Latin	Nominated	
MTV Video Music Awards	2020	"Amarillo"	Best Latin	Nominated	
MTV Video Music Awards	2020	"Qué Pena" (with Maluma)	Best Latin	Won	
MTV Video Music Awards	2021	"Un Dia (One Day)" (with Dua Lipa, Bad Bunny & Tainy)	Best Latin	Nominated	
MTV Video Music Awards	2022	"In da Getto" (with Skrillex)	Best Latin	Nominated	
MTV Europe Music Awards	2014	Himself	Best Latin America Central Act	Nominated	
MTV Europe Music Awards	2015	Himself	Best Latin America Central Act	Won	
MTV Europe Music Awards	2015	Himself	Best Worldwide Act: Latin America	Nominated	
MTV Europe Music Awards	2018	Himself	Best Latin America Central Act	Nominated	
MTV Europe Music Awards	2019	"Con Altura" (with Rosalía & El Guincho)	Best Collaboration	Won	
MTV Europe Music Awards	2019	"Con Altura" (with Rosalía & El Guincho)	Best Video	Nominated	
MTV Europe Music Awards	2020	Himself	Best Latin	Nominated	
MTV Europe Music Awards	2020	Himself	Best Virtual Live	Nominated	
MTV Europe Music Awards	2020	Himself	Best Latin America Central Act	Nominated	
MTV Europe Music Awards	2021	Himself	Best Latin	Nominated	
MTV Europe Music Awards	2021	Himself	Best Latin America Central Act	Nominated	
MTV Europe Music Awards	2022	Himself	Best Latin	Nominated	
MTV Millennial Awards	2014	Himself	Colombian Artist of the Year	Won	
MTV Millennial Awards	2015	Himself	Colombian Artist of the Year	Nominated	
MTV Millennial Awards	2015	Himself	Colombian Snapchater of the Year	Nominated	
MTV Millennial Awards	2015	"Ay Vamos"	Hit of the Year	Nominated	
MTV Millennial Awards	2016	Himself	Colombian Artist of the Year	Nominated	
MTV Millennial Awards	2016	Himself	Colombian Snapchater of the Year	Nominated	
MTV Millennial Awards	2016	"Ginza"	Hit of the Year	Won	
MTV Millennial Awards	2017	Himself	Colombian Artist of the Year	Nominated	
MTV Millennial Awards	2017	Himself	Best Performance in an App	Nominated	
MTV Millennial Awards	2017	Himself	Colombian Instagrammer of the Year	Nominated	
MTV Millennial Awards	2017	"Safari" (featuring Pharrell, BIA and Sky)	Video of the Year	Nominated	
MTV Millennial Awards	2017	"Safari" (featuring Pharrell, BIA and Sky)	Collaboration of the Year	Nominated	
MTV Millennial Awards	2017	"Otra Vez" (featuring Zion & Lennox)	Hit of the Year	Nominated	
MTV Millennial Awards	2018	Himself	Colombian Artist of the Year	Won	
MTV Millennial Awards	2018	Himself	Colombian Instagrammer of the Year	Nominated	
MTV Millennial Awards	2018	"Machika" (featuring Jeon and Anitta)	Video of the Year	Nominated	
MTV Millennial Awards	2018	"Downtown" (featuring Anitta)	Hit of the Year	Won	
MTV Millennial Awards	2018	"X" (featuring Nicky Jam)	Hit of the Year	Nominated	
MTV Millennial Awards	2018	"Mi Gente" (Remix) (featuring Willy William & Beyoncé)	Hit of the Year	Nominated	
MTV Millennial Awards	2018	"Sensualidad" (featuring Bad Bunny & Prince Royce)	Collaboration of the Year	Won	
MTV Millennial Awards	2019	Himself	Artist MIAW	Nominated	
MTV Millennial Awards	2019	Himself	Colombian Artist of the Year	Nominated	
MTV Millennial Awards	2019	Himself	Global Instagrammer	Nominated	
MTV Millennial Awards	2019	"I Like It" (featuring Catdi B & Bad Bunny)	Global Hit of the Year	Nominated	
MTV Millennial Awards	2019	"Con Altura" (featuring Rosalía & El Guincho)	Collaboration of the Year	Nominated	
MTV Millennial Awards	2019	"Con Altura" (featuring Rosalía & El Guincho)	Music-Ship of the Year	Nominated	
MTV Millennial Awards	2021	Himself	Artist MIAW	Nominated	
MTV Millennial Awards	2021	Himself	Colombian Artist of the Year	Nominated	
MTV Millennial Awards	2021	"Relación (Remix)" (with Sech, Daddy Yankee, Rosalía & Farruko)	Hit of the Year	Nominated	
MTV Millennial Awards	2021	"Location" (with Karol G & Anuel AA,)	Music-Ship of the Year	Nominated	
MTV Millennial Awards	2022	"Sigue" (with Ed Sheeran)	Music-Ship of the Year	Nominated	
MTV Millennial Awards	2022	Residente vs J Balvin	Viral Bomb	Nominated	
MTV Millennial Awards Brazil	2018	Machika (ft. Jeon and Anitta)	International Hit of the Year	Nominated	
MTV Millennial Awards Brazil	2018	Downtown (ft. Anitta)	Collaboration of the Year	Won	
MTV Millennial Awards Brazil	2019	Bola, Rebola	Hit of the Year	Won	
MTV Millennial Awards Brazil	2019	I Like It	International Hit of the Year	Nominated	
Much Music Video Awards	2018	I Like It (ft. Cardi B and Bad Bunny)	Song of the Summer	Nominated	
Nickelodeon Kids' Choice Awards	2019	J Balvin	Favorite Global Music Star	Nominated	
Nickelodeon Kids' Choice Awards	2019	"I Like It" (feat. Cardi B & Bad Bunny)	Favorite Collaboration	Nominated	
Nickelodeon Kids' Choice Awards	2020	J Balvin	Favorite Global Music Star	Nominated	
Nickelodeon Colombia Kids' Choice Awards	2014	J Balvin	Favorite Twitter	Nominated	
Nickelodeon Colombia Kids' Choice Awards	2015	J Balvin	Favorite National Artist or Group	Nominated	
Nickelodeon Colombia Kids' Choice Awards	2015	J Balvin	Favorite Fashion Act	Nominated	
Nickelodeon Colombia Kids' Choice Awards	2015	Ay vamos	Favorite Latin Song	Won	
Nickelodeon Colombia Kids' Choice Awards	2016	J Balvin	Favorite National Artist or Group	Nominated	
Nickelodeon Colombia Kids' Choice Awards	2016	J Balvin	Favorite Male Trendy	Nominated	
Nickelodeon Colombia Kids' Choice Awards	2016	Ginza	Favorite Latin Song	Nominated	
Nickelodeon Colombia Kids' Choice Awards	2017	J Balvin	Favorite National Artist or Group	Nominated	
Nickelodeon Colombia Kids' Choice Awards	2017	J Balvin	Favorite Male Trendy	Nominated	
Nickelodeon Colombia Kids' Choice Awards	2017	"Hey Ma" (with Camila Cabello & Pitbull)	Favorite Collaboration	Won	
Nickelodeon Mexico Kids' Choice Awards	2017	"Hey Ma" (with Camila Cabello & Pitbull)	Favorite Collaboration	Nominated	
Nickelodeon Mexico Kids' Choice Awards	2018	J Balvin	Favorite Latin Artist or Group	Nominated	
Nickelodeon Argentina Kids' Choice Awards	2016	Ginza	Favorite Song	Nominated	
Nickelodeon Argentina Kids' Choice Awards	2017	Mi Gente feat. Willy William	Favorite Collaboration	Nominated	
Nickelodeon Argentina Kids' Choice Awards	2017	"Hey Ma" (with Camila Cabello & Pitbull)	Favorite Song	Won	
Nickelodeon Argentina Kids' Choice Awards	2018	J Balvin	Favorite International Artist or Group	Nominated	
Meus Prêmios Nick	2017	"Hey Ma" (with Camila Cabello & Pitbull)	Favorite Collaboration	Won	
NRJ Music Awards	2017	J Balvin with Willy William	International Group/Duo of the Year	Nominated	
NRJ Music Awards	2017	J Balvin with Nicky Jam	International Group/Duo of the Year	Nominated	
NRJ Music Awards	2017	"X"	International Song of the Year	Nominated	
People's Choice Awards	2018	J Balvin	Latin Artist of the Year	Nominated	
People's Choice Awards	2018	"I Like It"	Song of the Year	Nominated	
People's Choice Awards	2020	J Balvin	The Male Artist of 2020	Nominated	
People's Choice Awards	2020	J Balvin	The Latin Artist of 2020	Nominated	
People's Choice Awards	2020	"Un Día (One Day)"	The Music Video of 2020	Nominated	
People's Choice Awards	2020	J Balvin	The Latin Artist of 2021	Nominated	
People's Choice Awards	2020	"Location" (with Karol G & Anuel AA)	The Music Video of 2021	Nominated	
Premios Juventud	2014	"6 AM" (with Farruko)	La Combinación Perfecta	Nominated	
Premios Juventud	2014	La Familia	Lo Toco Todo	Nominated	
Premios Juventud	2015	Himself	My Urban Artist	Nominated	
Premios Juventud	2015	"Ay Vamos"	Most Listened Song	Nominated	
Premios Juventud	2015	"Ay Vamos"	My Favorite Ringtone	Nominated	
Premios Juventud	2016	Himself	Best Urban Artist	Nominated	
Premios Juventud	2016	Himself	Best Twitter Act	Nominated	
Premios Juventud	2016	Himself	Best "Fan Army"	Nominated	
Premios Juventud	2016	"Ginza"	Most Listened Song	Nominated	
Premios Juventud	2016	La Familia Tour	Best Tour	Nominated	
Premios Juventud	2017	Himself	Best Fashionista	Nominated	
Premios Juventud	2017	Himself	Best Artist Instagram	Nominated	
Premios Juventud	2017	"Sigo Extrañándote"	Best Video	Won	
Premios Juventud	2017	"Sigo Extrañándote"	Best Song For "Chillin"	Nominated	
Premios Juventud	2017	"Otra Vez" (with Zion & Lennox)	Best Song For "Chillin"	Nominated	
Premios Juventud	2017	"Otra Vez" (with Zion & Lennox)	The Perfect Combination	Nominated	
Premios Juventud	2017	"Hey Ma" (with Camila Cabello & Pitbull)	Best Song For Dancing	Nominated	
Premios Juventud	2019	Himself	Best Scroll Stopper	Nominated	
Premios Juventud	2019	Himself	Street Style	Nominated	
Premios Juventud	2019	Himself	Hair Obsessed	Won	
Premios Juventud	2019	"Reggaetón"	Best Song: The Traffic Jam	Nominated	
Premios Juventud	2019	"Con Altura" (with Rosalía)	Best Choreography	Nominated	
Premios Juventud	2019	"I Can't Get Enough" (with Benny Blanco, Tainy & Selena Gomez)	Best Behind the Scenes	Nominated	
Premios Juventud	2020	Himself	Best Featured Artist	Won	
Premios Juventud	2020	Himself	Trendsetter	Nominated	
Premios Juventud	2020	Himself	Hair Obsessed	Won	
Premios Juventud	2020	Himself	Sneakerhead	Nominated	
Premios Juventud	2020	"Ritmo (Bad Boys For Life)" (with Black Eyed Peas)	Can't Get Enough Of This Song	Nominated	
Premios Juventud	2020	"China" (with Anuel AA, Daddy Yankee, Karol G & Ozuna)	The Traffic Jam	Won	
Premios Juventud	2020	"China" (with Anuel AA, Daddy Yankee, Karol G & Ozuna)	The Perfect Mix	Won	
Premios Juventud	2020	"Indeciso" (with Reik & Lalo Ebratt)	The Perfect Mix	Nominated	
Premios Juventud	2020	"Qué Pena" (with Maluma)	The Perfect Mix	Nominated	
Premios Juventud	2020	"Amarillo"	Best Choreography	Nominated	
Premios Juventud	2020	"Rojo"	Video with a Message	Won	
Premios Juventud	2021	Himself	Male Youth Artist of the Year	Nominated	
Premios Juventud	2021	Himself	Trendsetter	Nominated	
Premios Juventud	2021	Himself	Fans Helper	Nominated	
Premios Juventud	2021	"Tu Veneno"	Song of the Year	Nominated	
Premios Juventud	2021	"Un Día (One Day)" (with Dua Lipa, Bad Bunny & Tainy)	Video With the Best Social Message	Won	
Premios Juventud	2021	"Un Día (One Day)" (with Dua Lipa, Bad Bunny & Tainy)	Collaboration With an Anglo Artist	Nominated	
Premios Juventud	2021	"Un Día (One Day)" (with Dua Lipa, Bad Bunny & Tainy)	Best Collaboration	Nominated	
Premios Juventud	2021	"Agua" (with Tainy)	Song with the Best Collaboration	Nominated	
Premios Juventud	2021	"Porfa (Remix)" (with Feid, Justin Quiles, J Balvin, Nicky Jam & Sech)	Song with the Best Collaboration	Nominated	
Premios Juventud	2021	"Relación (Remix)" (with Sech, Daddy Yankee, Rosalía & Farruko)	Song with the Best Collaboration	Won	
Premios Juventud	2021	"Relación (Remix)" (with Sech, Daddy Yankee, Rosalía & Farruko)	Song with the Fastest Rise in Social Media	Nominated	
Premios Juventud	2021	"Relación (Remix)" (with Sech, Daddy Yankee, Rosalía & Farruko)	The Traffic Jam	Nominated	
Premios Juventud	2022	Himself	Artist of the Youth – Male	Nominated	
Premios Juventud	2022	Himself	My Favorite Streaming Artist	Nominated	
Premios Juventud	2022	Himself	Trendiest Artist	Nominated	
Premios Juventud	2022	Jose	Album of the Year	Nominated	
Premios Juventud	2022	"In da Getto" (with Skrillex)	The Catchiest Song	Nominated	
Premios Juventud	2022	"In da Getto" (with Skrillex)	Best Social Dance Challenge	Nominated	
Premios Juventud	2022	"Una Nota" (with Sech)	The Perfect Mix	Nominated	
Premios Juventud	2022	"Sigue" (with Ed Sheeran)	Collaboration OMG	Nominated	
Premios Juventud	2022	"Niño Soñador"	Video with Best Social Message	Nominated	
Premios Juventud	2022	"Poblado (Remix)" (with Karol G, Nicky Jam, Crissin, Totoy El Frío, Natan & Shander)	Viral Track of the Year	Nominated	
Premios Juventud	2022	"Qué Más Pues?" (with María Becerra)	Viral Track of the Year	Nominated	
Premios Juventud	2023	Himself	My Favorite Streaming Artist	Nominated	
Premios Juventud	2023	"Forever My Love" (with Ed Sheeran)	OMG Collaboration	Nominated	
Premios Juventud	2023	"No Más" (with Murda Beatz, Quavo, Anitta & Pharrell)	OMG Collaboration	Nominated	
Premios Juventud	2023	"Nivel de Perreo" (with Ryan Castro)	Best Urban Mix	Nominated	
Premios Juventud	2024	"Dientes" (with Usher)	OMG Collaboration	Nominated	
Premios Juventud	2024	"Dientes" (with Usher)	Favorite Dance Track	Nominated	
Premios Juventud	2025	Rayo	Best Urban Album	Nominated	
Premios Juventud	2025	"Polvo de Tu Vida" (with Chencho Corleone)	Best Urban Track	Nominated	
Premios Juventud	2025	“+57” (with Karol G, Feid, Dfzm, Ovy On The Drums, Maluma, Ryan Castro & Blessd)	Best Urban Track	Nominated	
Premios Juventud	2026	"Celosa" (with Ke Personajes)	Best Cumbia Song	Nominated	
Premios Juventud	2026	"Tonto" (with Ryan Castro & DJ Snake)	Best Urban Mix	Won	
Premios Juventud	2026	"Si Te Vas" (with Jay Wheeler)	Best Urban Rhythmic Song	Nominated	
Premio Lo Nuestro	2015	Himself	Artist of the Year	Nominated	
Premio Lo Nuestro	2015	Himself	Urban Artist of the Year	Won	
Premio Lo Nuestro	2015	"6 AM" (with Farruko)	Best Urban Song of the Year	Won	
Premio Lo Nuestro	2015	"6 AM" (with Farruko)	Best Urban Collaboration of the Year	Won	
Premio Lo Nuestro	2015	La Familia	Urban Album of the Year	Won	
Premio Lo Nuestro	2016	Himself	Artist of the Year	Won	
Premio Lo Nuestro	2016	Himself	Urban Album of the Year	Won	
Premio Lo Nuestro	2017	Himself	Artist of the Year	Won	
Premio Lo Nuestro	2017	Himself	Male Artist of the Year	Won	
Premio Lo Nuestro	2017	Himself	Urban Artist	Nominated	
Premio Lo Nuestro	2017	Energía	Urban Album	Nominated	
Premio Lo Nuestro	2017	"Safari"	Single of the Year	Nominated	
Premio Lo Nuestro	2017	"Bobo"	Urban Song	Nominated	
Premio Lo Nuestro	2019	Himself	Artist of the Year	Won	
Premio Lo Nuestro	2019	Himself	Male Urban Artist of the Year	Nominated	
Premio Lo Nuestro	2019	Himself	Social Artist of the Year	Won	
Premio Lo Nuestro	2019	"I Like It" (with Cardi B & Bad Bunny)	Crossover Collaboration of the Year	Nominated	
Premio Lo Nuestro	2019	"Mi Cama (Remix)" (with Karol G & Nicky Jam)	Video of the Year	Won	
Premio Lo Nuestro	2019	"X" (with Nicky Jam)	Song of the Year	Nominated	
Premio Lo Nuestro	2019	"X" (with Nicky Jam)	Single of the Year	Nominated	
Premio Lo Nuestro	2019	"X" (with Nicky Jam)	Collaboration of the Year	Nominated	
Premio Lo Nuestro	2019	"X" (with Nicky Jam)	Urban Song of the Year	Nominated	
Premio Lo Nuestro	2019	"X" (with Nicky Jam)	Urban Collaboration of the Year	Nominated	
Premio Lo Nuestro	2019	"Machika" (with Anitta & Jeon)	Urban Collaboration of the Year	Nominated	
Premio Lo Nuestro	2019	Vibras Tour	Tour of the Year	Nominated	
Premio Lo Nuestro	2020	Himself	Male Urban Artist of the Year	Nominated	
Premio Lo Nuestro	2020	Himself	Global Icon Award	Won	
Premio Lo Nuestro	2020	"Baila Baila Baila (Remix)" (with Ozuna, Daddy Yankee, Anuel AA & Farruko)	Remix of the Year	Nominated	
Premio Lo Nuestro	2020	"Contra La Pared" (with Sean Paul)	Crossover Collaboration of the Year	Nominated	
Premio Lo Nuestro	2020	"I Can't Get Enough" (with Benny Blanco, Tainy & Selena Gomez)	Crossover Collaboration of the Year	Nominated	
Premio Lo Nuestro	2020	"No Me Conoce (Remix)" (with Jhayco & Bad Bunny)	Urban/Trap Song of the Year	Nominated	
Premio Lo Nuestro	2020	"Qué Pretendes" (with Bad Bunny)	Urban Song of the Year	Nominated	
Premio Lo Nuestro	2020	"Qué Pretendes" (with Bad Bunny)	Urban Collaboration of the Year	Nominated	
Premio Lo Nuestro	2020	Oasis	Album of the Year	Won	
Premio Lo Nuestro	2020	Arcoíris Tour	Tour of the Year	Nominated	
Premio Lo Nuestro	2021	Himself	Artist of the Year	Nominated	
Premio Lo Nuestro	2021	Himself	Male Artist of the Year	Nominated	
Premio Lo Nuestro	2021	"Porfa (Remix)" (with Feid, Justin Quiles, J Balvin, Nicky Jam & Sech)	Remix of the Year	Nominated	
Premio Lo Nuestro	2021	"Relación (Remix)" (with Sech, Daddy Yankee, Rosalía & Farruko)	Remix of the Year	Nominated	
Premio Lo Nuestro	2021	"Un Día (One Day)" (with Dua Lipa, Bad Bunny & Tainy)	Crossover Collaboration of the Year	Won	
Premio Lo Nuestro	2021	"Ritmo (Bad Boys For Life)" (with Black Eyed Peas)	Crossover Collaboration of the Year	Nominated	
Premio Lo Nuestro	2021	"Ritmo (Bad Boys For Life)" (with Black Eyed Peas)	Urban Collaboration of the Year	Nominated	
Premio Lo Nuestro	2021	"Ritmo (Bad Boys For Life)" (with Black Eyed Peas)	Urban Song of the Year	Nominated	
Premio Lo Nuestro	2021	"Morado"	Song of the Year	Nominated	
Premio Lo Nuestro	2021	"Morado"	Urban Song of the Year	Nominated	
Premio Lo Nuestro	2021	"Qué Pena" (with Maluma)	Urban Collaboration of the Year	Nominated	
Premio Lo Nuestro	2021	"Medusa" (with Jhayco & Anuel AA)	Urban/Trap Song of the Year	Nominated	
Premio Lo Nuestro	2021	Colores	Album of the Year	Nominated	
Premio Lo Nuestro	2022	Himself	Artist of the Year	Nominated	
Premio Lo Nuestro	2022	Himself	Urban Male of the Year	Nominated	
Premio Lo Nuestro	2022	"In da Getto" (with Skrillex)	Crossover collaboration of the Year	Won	
Premio Lo Nuestro	2022	"In da Getto" (with Skrillex)	Dance/Urban Song of the Year	Nominated	
Premio Lo Nuestro	2022	"AM (Remix)" (with Nio Garcia & Bad Bunny)	Urban Collaboration of the Year	Won	
Premio Lo Nuestro	2022	"Location" (with Karol G & Anuel AA)	Urban Collaboration of the Year	Nominated	
Premio Lo Nuestro	2022	"Tu Veneno"	Urban Song of the Year	Nominated	
Premio Lo Nuestro	2022	"Qué Más Pues?" (with María Becerra)	Urban/Pop Song of the Year	Won	
Premio Lo Nuestro	2022	Jose	Album of the Year	Nominated	
Premio Lo Nuestro	2022	Jose	Urban Album of the Year	Nominated	
Premio Lo Nuestro	2023	Himself	Artist of the Year	Nominated	
Premio Lo Nuestro	2023	Himself	Urban Male of the Year	Nominated	
Premio Lo Nuestro	2023	"Una Nota" (with Sech)	Song of the Year	Nominated	
Premio Lo Nuestro	2023	"Una Nota" (with Sech)	Urban Collaboration of the Year	Nominated	
Premio Lo Nuestro	2023	"Sal y Perrea (Remix)" (with Sech & Daddy Yankee)	Remix of the Year	Won	
Premio Lo Nuestro	2023	"Sigue" (with Ed Sheeran)	Crossover Collaboration of the Year	Nominated	
Premio Lo Nuestro	2023	"Nivel de Perreo" (with Ryan Castro)	Urban Song of the Year	Nominated	
Premio Lo Nuestro	2024	"Dientes" (with Usher)	Crossover Collaboration of the Year	Nominated	
Premio Lo Nuestro	2025	Rayo	Urban Album of the Year	Nominated	
Premio Lo Nuestro	2025	"Polvo de Tu Vida" (with Chencho Corleone)	Urban Collaboration of the Year	Nominated	
Premio Lo Nuestro	2026	Himself	Urban Male Artist of the Year	Nominated	
Premio Lo Nuestro	2026	“I Adore You” (with Hugel, Ellie Goulding Ft. Topic, Arash & Daecolm)	Crossover Collaboration of the Year	Nominated	
Premio Lo Nuestro	2026	“Misterio” (with Gilberto Santa Rosa)	The Perfect Mix of the Year	Nominated	
Premio Lo Nuestro	2026	“Rio”	Urban Song of the Year	Nominated	
Premio Lo Nuestro	2026	“Doblexxó” (with Feid)	Urban Collaboration of the Year	Nominated	
Premio Lo Nuestro	2026	“+57” (with Karol G, Feid, Dfzm, Ovy On The Drums, Maluma, Ryan Castro & Blessd)	Urban Collaboration of the Year	Won	
Premios Nuestra Tierra	2014	Himself	Artist of the Year	Nominated	
Premios Nuestra Tierra	2014	Himself	Best Mainstream Artist	Won	
Premios Nuestra Tierra	2014	Himself	Tweeter of the Year	Nominated	
Premios Nuestra Tierra	2014	La Familia del Negocio	Best Fan Club	Won	
Premios Nuestra Tierra	2020	Himself	Artist of the Year	Won	
Premios Nuestra Tierra	2020	Himself	Best Urban Artist	Won	
Premios Nuestra Tierra	2020	Himself	Best Artist - Public Vote	Nominated	
Premios Nuestra Tierra	2020	"Blanco"	Best Urban Song	Nominated	
Premios Nuestra Tierra	2020	"Blanco"	Best Video	Won	
Premios Nuestra Tierra	2020	"Ritmo (Bad Boys For Life)" (with Black Eyed Peas)	Best Dance/Electron Song	Won	
Premios Nuestra Tierra	2020	"Ritmo (Bad Boys For Life)" (with Black Eyed Peas)	Best Song - Public Vote	Nominated	
Premios Nuestra Tierra	2020	Arcoíris Tour	Best Tour	Won	
Premios Nuestra Tierra	2021	Himself	Artist of the Year	Nominated	
Premios Nuestra Tierra	2021	Himself	Best Picture in the World	Nominated	
Premios Nuestra Tierra	2021	Himself	Best Urban Artist	Won	
Premios Nuestra Tierra	2021	Himself	Best Artist - Public Vote	Nominated	
Premios Nuestra Tierra	2021	"Rojo"	Song of the Year	Nominated	
Premios Nuestra Tierra	2021	"Rojo"	Best Video	Won	
Premios Nuestra Tierra	2021	"Azul"	Best Urban Song	Nominated	
Premios Nuestra Tierra	2021	Colores	Album of the Year	Won	
Premios Nuestra Tierra	2022	Himself	Best Urban Artist	Nominated	
Premios Nuestra Tierra	2022	"In da Getto" (with Skrillex)	Best Dance/Electron Song	Won	
Premios Nuestra Tierra	2024	"Dientes" (with Usher)	Best Urban Collaboration	Nominated	
Premios Nuestra Tierra	2024	"Dientes" (with Usher)	Best Music Video	Nominated	
Premios Nuestra Tierra	2025	Himself	Best Global Artist	Nominated	
Premios Nuestra Tierra	2025	"Gafas Negras" (with Maluma)	Best Urban Collaboration	Nominated	
Premios Nuestra Tierra	2025	“+57” (with Karol G, Feid, Dfzm, Ovy On The Drums, Maluma, Ryan Castro & Blessd)	Best Urban Collaboration	Nominated	
Premios Nuestra Tierra	2026	Himself	Best Global Artist	Nominated	
Premios Nuestra Tierra	2026	Himself	Best Urban Artist	Nominated	
Premios Nuestra Tierra	2026	"Rio"	Best Song/Composition of the Year	Nominated	
Premios Nuestra Tierra	2026	"Rio"	Best Urban Song	Won	
Premios Nuestra Tierra	2026	Ciudad Primavera	Best Concert	Won	
Premios Odeón	2020	Himself	Latin Artist of the Year	Nominated	
Premios Odeón	2020	"Con Altura" (with Rosalía)	Best Song of the Year	Nominated	
Premios Odeón	2020	"Con Altura" (with Rosalía)	Best Video of the Year	Won	
Premios Odeón	2021	Himself	Latin Artist of the Year	Nominated	
Premios Odeón	2022	Himself	Latin Artist of the Year	Nominated	
Premios Odeón	2022	Jose	Best Latin Album	Nominated	
Radio Disney Music Awards	2018	"Mi Gente" (with Willy William)	Best Collaboration	Nominated	
Soul Train Music Awards	2018	"I Like It" (with Cardi B & Bad Bunny)	Rhythm & Bars Award	Nominated	
Spotify Awards	2020	Himself	Artist of the Year	Nominated	
Spotify Awards	2020	Himself	Most-Streamed Male Artist	Nominated	
Spotify Awards	2020	Himself	Most-Shared Artist	Won	
Spotify Awards	2020	Himself	Most-Added to Playlists Artist	Nominated	
Spotify Awards	2020	Himself	Artist with more songs in the Top 200	Nominated	
Spotify Awards	2020	Himself	Most popular artist on consoles	Nominated	
Spotify Awards	2020	Himself	Artist most listened to by users aged 13 to 17 years old	Nominated	
Spotify Awards	2020	Himself	Artist most listened to by users aged 18 to 29 years old	Nominated	
Spotify Awards	2020	Himself	Artist most listened to by users 30 to 44 years old	Nominated	
Spotify Awards	2020	"La Canción" (with Bad Bunny)	Summer Song	Nominated	
Telehit Awards	2015	"Ginza"	Best Video in Spanish	Won	
Telehit Awards	2016	Himself	Urban Artist of the Year	Nominated	
Telehit Awards	2016	"Bobo"	Urban Song of the Year	Nominated	
Telehit Awards	2017	Himself	Urban Artist of the Year	Won	
Telehit Awards	2017	"Mi Gente" (with Willy William)	Song of the Year	Nominated	
Telehit Awards	2017	"Mi Gente" (with Willy William)	Video of the Year	Nominated	
Telehit Awards	2019	Himself	Latin Artist of the Year	Won	
Telehit Awards	2019	Himself	Male Artist of the Year	Nominated	
Telehit Awards	2019	"Con Altura" (with Rosalía)	Best Urban Video of the Year	Won	
Telehit Awards	2019	"Con Altura" (with Rosalía)	Best Urban Song of the Year	Nominated	
Telehit Awards	2019	"China" (with Anuel AA, Daddy Yankee, Karol G & Ozuna)	Best Urban Song of the Year	Nominated	
Telehit Awards	2019	"China" (with Anuel AA, Daddy Yankee, Karol G & Ozuna)	Best Urban Video of the Year	Nominated	
Teen Choice Awards	2016	Himself	Choice Music International	Nominated	
Teen Choice Awards	2017	"Hey Ma" (with Camila Cabello & Pitbull)	Choice Latin Song	Nominated	
Teen Choice Awards	2018	Himself	Choice Latin Artist	Nominated	
Teen Choice Awards	2018	"Mi Gente" (with Willy William)	Choice Latin Song	Nominated	
Teen Choice Awards	2018	"Familiar" (with Liam Payne)	Choice Latin Song	Won	
Teen Choice Awards	2018	"Familiar" (with Liam Payne)	Choice Summer Song	Nominated	
Teen Choice Awards	2019	Himself	Choice Latin Artist	Nominated	
Teen Choice Awards	2019	"Baila Baila Baila (Remix)" (with Ozuna, Daddy Yankee, Anuel AA & Farruko)	Choice Latin Song	Nominated	
Teen Choice Awards	2019	"Con Altura" (with Rosalía)	Choice Latin Song	Nominated	
Telemundo's Tu Musica Urban Awards	2019	Himself	International Male Artist of the Year	Won	
Telemundo's Tu Musica Urban Awards	2019	"No Es Justo" (with Zion & Lennox)	International Artist Song of the Year	Nominated	
Telemundo's Tu Musica Urban Awards	2019	"I Like It" (with Cardi B & Bad Bunny)	International Artist Song of the Year	Nominated	
Telemundo's Tu Musica Urban Awards	2019	"I Like It" (with Cardi B & Bad Bunny)	International Artist Video of the Year	Nominated	
Telemundo's Tu Musica Urban Awards	2019	"No Es Justo" (with Zion & Lennox)	Duo/Group Song of the Year	Nominated	
Telemundo's Tu Musica Urban Awards	2019	"Bonita" (with Jowell & Randy)	Duo/Group Song of the Year	Nominated	
Telemundo's Tu Musica Urban Awards	2019	"X" (with Nicky Jam)	Video of the Year	Nominated	
Telemundo's Tu Musica Urban Awards	2019	"X" (with Nicky Jam)	Collaboration of the Year	Nominated	
Telemundo's Tu Musica Urban Awards	2019	Vibras	Album of the Year	Nominated	
Telemundo's Tu Musica Urban Awards	2020	Himself	Male Artist of the Year	Nominated	
Telemundo's Tu Musica Urban Awards	2020	Himself	Artist of the Year	Nominated	
Telemundo's Tu Musica Urban Awards	2020	"Blanco"	Male Song of the Year	Nominated	
Telemundo's Tu Musica Urban Awards	2020	"No Me Conoce (Remix)" (with Jhayco & Bad Bunny)	New Generation Remix of the Year	Nominated	
Telemundo's Tu Musica Urban Awards	2020	"No Me Conoce (Remix)" (with Jhayco & Bad Bunny)	Video of the Year	Nominated	
Telemundo's Tu Musica Urban Awards	2020	"La Canción" (with Bad Bunny)	Song of the Year	Nominated	
Telemundo's Tu Musica Urban Awards	2020	"La Canción" (with Bad Bunny)	Collaboration of the Year	Nominated	
Telemundo's Tu Musica Urban Awards	2020	"La Canción" (with Bad Bunny)	Video of the Year	Nominated	
Telemundo's Tu Musica Urban Awards	2020	"Con Altura" (with Rosalía)	Video of the Year	Nominated	
Telemundo's Tu Musica Urban Awards	2020	"Con Altura" (with Rosalía)	New Generation Collaboration of the Year	Nominated	
Telemundo's Tu Musica Urban Awards	2020	"Pinky Ring" (with Miky Woodz)	New Generation Collaboration of the Year	Nominated	
Telemundo's Tu Musica Urban Awards	2020	Arcoiris Tour	Concert of the Year	Nominated	
Telemundo's Tu Musica Urban Awards	2020	"China" (with Anuel AA, Daddy Yankee, Karol G & Ozuna)	Video of the Year	Won	
Telemundo's Tu Musica Urban Awards	2020	Oasis	Male Album of the Year	Won	
Telemundo's Tu Musica Urban Awards	2022	Himself	Artist of the Year	Nominated	
Telemundo's Tu Musica Urban Awards	2022	Himself	Top Social Artist	Nominated	
Telemundo's Tu Musica Urban Awards	2022	Jose	Male Album of the Year	Nominated	
Telemundo's Tu Musica Urban Awards	2022	"Una Nota" (with Sech)	Collaboration of the Year	Nominated	
Telemundo's Tu Musica Urban Awards	2022	"Sigue" (with Ed Sheeran)	Top Latin Crossover Song	Nominated	
Telemundo's Tu Musica Urban Awards	2022	"Poblado (Remix)" (with Karol G, Nicky Jam, Crissin, Totoy El Frío, Natan & Shander)	Remix of the Year	Won	
Telemundo's Tu Musica Urban Awards	2022	"AM (Remix)" (with Nio Garcia & Bad Bunny)	Remix of the Year	Nominated	
Telemundo's Tu Musica Urban Awards	2022	"Sal y Perrea (Remix)" (with Sech & Daddy Yankee)	Remix of the Year	Nominated	
Telemundo's Tu Musica Urban Awards	2022	"Qué Más Pues?" (with María Becerra)	Song of the Year	Won	
Telemundo's Tu Musica Urban Awards	2022	"In da Getto" (with Skrillex)	Song of the Year	Nominated	
Urban Music Awards	2019	Himself	Artist of the Year – South America	Won	
Urban Music Awards	2023	Himself	Artist of the Year – South America	Nominated	
Variety's Hitmakers	2020	Himself	Collaborator of the Year	Won	
