= Vibras Tour =

2018 concert tour by J Balvin

- Tour by J Balvin
- Associated album: Vibras
- Start date: May 26, 2018
- End date: November 24, 2018
- Legs: 2
- No. of shows: 38 in North America; 7 in South America; 2 in Europe; 2 in Asia; 49 in total

J Balvin concert chronology
- Energia Tour (2016—2018); Vibras Tour (2018); Arcoiris Tour (2019-2020)

The Vibras Tour was the third headlining concert tour by Colombian singer J Balvin to promote his fifth studio album, Vibras (2018). The tour began on May 26, 2018 in Mexico City, and concluded on November 24, 2018 in Buenos Aires.

== Set list ==
This set list is representative of the first concert of the tour, on July 28, 2018. It does not represent all concerts for the duration of the tour.

1. "Vibras"
2. "Mi Gente"
3. "Machika"
4. "Safari"
5. "Otra Vez"
6. "Downtown"
7. "Sorry (Latino Remix)"
8. "Ahora"
9. "Bonita"
10. "Ambiente"
11. "No Es Justo"
12. "Mi Cama (Remix)"
13. "Quiero Repetir"
14. "Bum Bum Tam Tam"
15. "Soy Peor (Remix)"
16. "Ahora Dice"
17. "Si Tu Novio Te Deja Sola"
18. "Sensualidad"
19. "Ay Vamos"
20. "6 AM"
21. "Peligrosa"
22. "Brillo"
23. "Sigo Extrañándote"
24. "X"
25. "Ginza"

== Shows ==
List of concerts, showing date, city, country, venue, opening acts, tickets sold, number of available tickets and amount of gross revenue
Date	City	Country	Venue	Opening acts	Attendance	Revenue
North America
May 26, 2018	Mexico City	Mexico	Mexico City Arena	—	—	—
May 27, 2018	Las Vegas	United States	Mandalay Bay Beach	—	—	—
June 27, 2018 (Note: The June 27, 2018 concert in Monterrey is part of the Machaca Fest 2018.)	Monterrey	Mexico	Fundidora Park • Machaca Fest	—	—	—
Europe
July 1, 2018 (Note: The July 1, 2018 concert in Amsterdam is part of Festival Pal Mundo.)	Amsterdam	Netherlands	Arenapark	—	—	—
South America
July 25, 2018	Coquimbo	Chile	Estadio Municipal	—	—	—
July 26, 2018	Antofagasta	Chile	Sokol Arena	—	—	—
July 28, 2018	Santiago	Chile	Movistar Arena	—	—	—
July 29, 2018	Concepción	Chile	Teatro Municipal	—	—	—
August 3, 2018	Bogotá	Colombia	Centro Autopista Norte	—	—	—
August 4, 2018 (Note: The August 4, 2018 concert in Medellín is part of Festival of the Flowers.)	Medellín	Colombia	Estadio Atanasio Girardot	—	—	—
Europe
August 8, 2018 (Note: The August 8, 2018 concert in Odemira is part of the Meo Sudoeste festival.)	Odemira	Portugal	MEO Stage	—	—	—
Asia
August 18, 2018 (Note: The August 18, 2018 concert in Osaka and the August 19, 2015 concert in Chiba are both part of the Summer Sonic Festival.)	Osaka	Japan	Maishima Sonic Park	—	—	—
August 19, 2018	Chiba	Japan	Zozo Marine Stadium	—	—	—
North America
August 30, 2018	Mérida	Mexico	Coliseo Yucatán	—	—	—
August 31, 2018	Puebla City	Mexico	Acropolis Puebla	—	—	—
September 1, 2018	Colima	Mexico	Megapalenque de Villa de Álvarez	—	—	—
September 2, 2018	Querétaro	Mexico	Auditorio Josefa Ortiz	—	—	—
September 6, 2018	Xalapa	Mexico	Parque Deportivo Colón	—	—	—
September 8, 2018	Culiacán	Mexico	Foro Tecate	—	—	—
September 9, 2018	Hermosillo	Mexico	Expo Forum	—	—	—
September 15, 2018 (Note: The September 15, 2018 concert in Panama City is part of the Panamax Fest.)	Panama City	Panama	Figali Convention Center	—	—	—
September 19, 2018	Fresno	United States	Selland Arena	—	—	—
September 20, 2018	Oakland	United States	Oracle Arena	—	—	—
September 21, 2018	San Diego	United States	Viejas Arena	—		
September 22, 2018	Inglewood	United States	The Forum	—	23,728 / 23,728	$1,808,039
September 23, 2018	Inglewood	United States	The Forum	—	23,728 / 23,728	$1,808,039
September 26, 2018	Salt Lake City	United States	Vivint Smart Home Arena	—		
September 28, 2018	Las Vegas	United States	Mandalay Bay Events Center	—		
September 29, 2018	Phoenix	United States	Comerica Theatre	—		
September 30, 2018	El Paso	United States	Don Haskins Center	—		
October 3, 2018	Laredo	United States	Sames Auto Arena	—		
October 4, 2018	Houston	United States	Smart Financial Centre	—		
October 5, 2018	Dallas	United States	The Pavilion	—		
October 6, 2018	Edinburg	United States	Bert Ogden Arena	—	—	—
October 7, 2018	San Antonio	United States	Freeman Coliseum	—	—	—
October 10, 2018	Minneapolis	United States	Minneapolis Armory	—	—	—
October 11, 2018	Milwaukee	United States	Fiserv Forum	—	—	—
October 12, 2018	Rosemont	United States	Allstate Arena	—	—	—
October 13, 2018	Kansas City	United States	Sprint Center	—	—	—
October 14, 2018	Denver	United States	Pepsi Center	—	4,774 / 5,817	$316,530
October 18, 2018	Boston	United States	Agganis Arena	—	4,761 / 5,213	$350,323
October 19, 2018	Reading	United States	Santander Arena	—	—	—
October 20, 2018	Brooklyn	United States	Barclays Center	—	—	—
October 21, 2018	Fairfax	United States	EagleBank Arena	—	—	—
October 24, 2018	Greensboro	United States	Greensboro Coliseum Complex	—	—	—
October 25, 2018	Nashville	United States	Nashville Municipal Auditorium	—	—	—
October 26, 2018	Duluth	United States	Infinite Energy Arena	—	—	—
October 27, 2018	Tampa	United States	Yuengling Center	—	3,974 / 4,026	$293,823
October 28, 2018	Miami	United States	American Airlines Arena	—	9,217 / 10,089	$738,518
South America
November 21, 2018	Córdoba	Argentina	Quality Espacio	—	—	—
November 22, 2018	Rosario	Argentina	Salón Metropolitano	—	—	—
November 24, 2018	Buenos Aires	Argentina	Luna Park	—	—	—
Total					—	—

=== Cancelled shows ===
List of concerts, showing date, city, country, venue, cancellation reason
Date	City	Country	Venue	Reason(s) of cancellation
May 10, 2018	Guayaquil	Ecuador	Voltaire Paladines Polo Coliseum	Breach of contract
May 12, 2018	Quito	Ecuador	General Rumiñahui Coliseum	Breach of contract
August 10, 2018	Tenerife	Spain	Estadio Jose Ramos Tasagaya	Unknown
August 11, 2018	La Palma	Spain	Puerto de Tazacorte	Unknown
August 12, 2018	Málaga	Spain	Estadio Municipal El Pozuelo	Unknown
August 13, 2018	Cádiz	Spain	Estadio Bahía Sur	Unknown
