= 2017 Heat Latin Music Awards =

- Date: Thursday, June 8, 2017
- Venue: Cap Cana, Punta Cana, Dominican Republic
- Country: United States; Latin America

Highlights
- Most awards: J Balvin (3)
- Most nominations: Farruko (4); J Balvin (4)
- Website: premiosheat.com

Television/radio coverage
- Network: HTV; TBS

The 2017 Heat Latin Music Awards were held on June 8, 2017 at Cap Cana, Dominican Republic, and was broadcast live through HTV and TBS. The ceremony was hosted by Clarissa Molina and Enrique Santos. The awards celebrates the year's biggest Latin music acts. Farruko and J Balvin led the nominations with four each, followed by Lali and Maluma, with three each. Balvin was the bigger winner of the night with three trophies, including Best Music Video for "Bobo", Best Male Artist and Best Urban Artist".

== Performances ==
Artist(s)	Song(s)
Farruko; Jacob Forever; Sixto Rein	"Don't Let Go" "Quiéreme" "Luz Verde"
Andrés Cepeda	"Mejor que a Tí Me Va"
Fanny Lu	"Llorar Es Una Locura"
Sebastian Yatra; Nacho	"Traicionera" (Yatra) "Alguien Robo" "Báilame" (Nacho)
Mau & Ricky	"Toda para Mí"
Prince Royce; Farruko	"Ganas Locas"
Victor Manuelle	"Dile a Ella" "Si Tú Me Besas" "Que Suenen Los Tambores"
Carlos Vives	"Al Filo de Tu Amor" "La Bicicleta"
Juan Magán; Boni & Kelly	"Rápido Brusco Violento"
Marielle	"Qué Mal Te Va"
Gabriel	"Pa' Nosotros Dos"
Mozart La Para	"Pa' Gozar"
Eddy Herrera	"Tu eres ajena"
Johnny Ventura	"Merenguero hasta la tambora"
J Balvin; Jowell & Randy; Bad Bunny	"Sigo Extrañándote" "Bonita" "Si Tu Novio Te Deja Sola"

== Presenters ==
- Joey Montana and Farina — presented Best Tropical Artist
- Corina Smith and Gustavo Elis — presented Best Artist Andean Region
- Emeraude Toubia and Jonathan Molly — presented Best Rock Artist
- Techy Fatule and Jiggy Drama — presented Best Artist Southern Region
- Pipe Peláez and Adriana Lucía — presented Best Band/Group
- Alejandro González and Ozuna — presented Best Female Artist
- San Luis and Mariela Encarnación — presented Best Pop Artist
- Alexis & Fido and Covi Quintana — presented Engagement Award
- Mirella Cesa and Mr. Black — presented Best Artist Northern Region
- Karol G and Pasabordo — presented Best Male Artist
- Mia La Pretty Girl, Pipe Bueno and Mark B — presented Best New Artist
- Domino Saints and Vi-Em — presented Best Urban Artist
- Ricardo Montaner — presented Gold Award
- Mike Bahía and Greeicy Rendón — presented Best Music Video

== Nominees ==
Best Music Video	Best Male Artist
"Deja Que Te Bese" – Alejandro Sanz ft. Marc Anthony; "Una En Un Millón" – Alexis & Fido; "Soy Yo" – Bomba Estereo; "Andas en Mi Cabeza" – Chino & Nacho ft. Daddy Yankee; "Le Da Igual" – Cultura Profética; "Chillax" – Farruko; "Bobo" – J Balvin; "Traicionera" – Sebastian Yatra	Farruko; Fonseca; J Balvin; Jencarlos Canela; Marc Anthony; Maluma
Best Female Artist	Best Group/Band
Adriana Lucia; Fanny Lu; Karol G; Lali; Marielle Hazlo; Mirella Cesa	Alkilados; Chino & Nacho; ChocQuibTown; Cultura Profética; Gente de Zona; Piso 21
Best Rock Artist	Best Pop Artist
Aterciopelados; Bomba Estereo; Caramelos de Cianuro; Juanes; Lasso; León Larregui	Andrés Cepeda; Jesse & Joy; Lali; Manuel Medrano; Reik; Tommy Torres
Best Urban Artist	Best Tropical Artist
Alexis & Fido; Farruko; J Balvin; Maluma; Nicky Jam; Zion & Lennox	Carlos Vives; Eddie Herrera; Fonseca; Jonathan Moly; Marc Anthony; Victor Manuelle
Best Artist Northern Region	Best Artist Andean Region
Farruko; Gente de Zona; Joey Montana; Juan Magan; Prince Royce; Wisin	Carlos Vives; J Balvin; Maluma; Mike Bahia; San Luis; Sebastian Yatra
Best Artist Southern Region	Best New Artist
Ancud; Diego Torres; Lali; Marama; TINI; Vi-Em	Alejandro Gonzalez; Ancud; CNCO; Gabriel; Ozuna; Sixto Rein
Engagement Award	Gold Award
Victor Manuelle	Carlos Vives
