= Heat Latin Music Awards =

Annual Latin music awards

- Current: 2026 Heat Latin Music Awards
- Awarded for: Latin music culture
- Country: United States; Latin America
- Presented by: Premios Heat
- First award: June 4, 2015
- Website: premiosheat.com

Television/radio coverage
- Network: HTV (2015–2024); Telemedellín (2025); LosHeat.Tv (since 2025)

The Heat Latin Music Awards or Premios Heat is an annual awards show celebrating and honors the year's best of Latin music and culture. Founded by Colombian music executive Diana Montes in 2015, it aired on the HTV cable channel between 2015 and 2024 at Cap Cana in Punta Cana, Dominican Republic. Since 2025 the award show has been airing on Telemedellín from Medellín, Colombia.

== Ceremonies ==
The Heat Latin Music Awards were held in Punta Cana, Dominican Republic, until the 10th edition, where they were held in Medellín, Colombia.

Edition	Date	City	Country	Venue	Presenter(s)	Most wins	Most nominations	Ref.
1st	June 4, 2015	Punta Cana	Dominican Republic	Cap Cana	Karen Martínez; Ismael Cala	J Balvin (3)	Chino & Nacho (4); J Balvin (4)	
2nd	June 16, 2016	Punta Cana	Dominican Republic	Cap Cana	Jéssica Cediel	Chino & Nacho (2); Maluma (2)	Nicky Jam (4)	
3rd	June 8, 2017	Punta Cana	Dominican Republic	Cap Cana	Clarissa Molina; Enrique Santos	J Balvin (3)	Farruko (4); J Balvin (4)	
4th	May 13, 2019	Punta Cana	Dominican Republic	Hard Rock Hotel & Casino	Anaís Castro; Mariela, Encarnación,	Karol G (2)	J Balvin (4)	
5th	December 17, 2020	Punta Cana	Dominican Republic	Cap Cana	Enrique Santos; Anais Castro; Osmariel Villalobos	Karol G (2); Nicki Jam (2)	J Balvin (7)	
6th	July 1, 2021	Punta Cana	Dominican Republic	Cap Cana	Kunno; Melina Ramírez	J Balvin (3)	Karol G (5); J Balvin (5)Myke Towers (5)	
7th	June 2, 2022	Punta Cana	Dominican Republic	Cap Cana	Goyo, Molusco; Maria Laura Quintero; Caroline Aquino; Anaís Castro	Wisin (2)	Bad Bunny (5)	
8th	June 8, 2023	Punta Cana	Dominican Republic	Cap Cana	Ana De Armas	Karol G (5)	Bad Bunny (6) Feid (6) Karol G (6)	
9th	July 11, 2024	Punta Cana	Dominican Republic	Cap Cana	Marko Música; Amanda Dudamel; Carolina Aquino	Karol G (7)	Feid (10) Karol G (10)	
10th	May 29, 2025	Medellín	Colombia	Coliseo Iván de Bedout	Caroline Aquino	Beéle(4)	Beéle (7)	
11th	November 5, 2026	Jalisco	Mexico	Puerto Vallarta	Karime Pindter; Caroline Aquino; La Segura; Ignacio Baladán; Yohana Vargas; Dímelo King	TBA	Karol G (10)	

== Award categories ==
=== Current categories ===
- Best Video
- Best Male Artist
- Best Female Artist
- Best Group or Band
- Best New Artist
- Best Rock Artist
- Best Pop Artist
- Best Urban Artist
- Best Tropical Artist (Bachata, Merengue, Vallenato, Cumbia)
- Best Artist Northern Region
- Best Artist Andean Region
- Best Artist Southern Region
- Best Dominican Urban Artist
- Best Collaboration (2019–present)
- Best Popular Regional Artist (2020–present)
- Musical Promise (2020–present)
- Influencer of the Year (2020–present)
- Song of the Year (2023–present)
- DJ of the Year (2023–present)
- Best Song for Videogames, Series or Movies (2023–present)
- Best Content Platform (2023–present)
- Album of the Year (2024–present)
- Best Salsa Artist (2024–present)
- Best Religious Song (2024–present)
- Best Viral Song (2024–present)
- Composer of the Year (2024–present)
- Producer of the Year (2024–present)
- Director of the Year (2024–present)
- Fandom of the Year (2024–present)

=== Defunct categories ===
- Best Artist Pop/Rock (2015–2016)

== Special awards ==
The winners of these awards are chosen by the HTV staff, not the viewers.

=== Engagement Award ===
- Juan Luis Guerra (2015)
- Luis Fonsi (2016)
- Victor Manuelle (2017)
- Gloria Trevi (2021)

=== Gold Award ===
- Juanes (2015)
- Ricardo Montaner (2016)
- Carlos Vives (2017)
- Nicky Jam (2020)
- Wisin (2021)
- Manuel Mijares (2022)

=== Premio Compromiso ===
- Nacho (2020)
- Victor Manuelle (2021)
- Carlos Vives (2022)

=== Career Award ===
- Arcángel (2021)
- Wilkins (2021)

=== Feminine Empowerment Award ===
- Anitta (2021)

=== Lo + Heat Award ===
- Mike Bahía (2023)

== Records ==
As of the 2025 Heat Latin Music Awards, Karol G is the most awarded artist. J Balvin follows as the second most awarded and most awarded male artist, with 10 awards. Chino & Nacho is the most awarded group or duet, with 6 awards won.

Number of awards	Artist	Categories
20	Karol G	Best Female Artist (5), Best Music Video (5), Best Urban Artist (4), Song of the Year (3), Album of the Year, Best Collaboration, Best Song for Videogames, Series or Movies
10	J Balvin	Best Male Artist (3), Best Urban Artist (3), Best Music Video (2), Best Collaboration, Gold Award
6	Nicky Jam	Best Male Artist (2), Best Urban Artist (2), Best Artist Northern Region, Gold Award
6	Chino & Nacho	Best Group or Band (4), Best Tropical Artist, Best Music Video
5	Feid	Best Male Artist (3), Best Viral Song, Composer of the Year
5	Morat	Best Rock Artist (3), Best Group or Band (2)
4	Anitta	Best Artist South Region (3), Best Music Video
4	Beéle	Best Urban Artist, Best Artist Andean Region, Best Collaboration, Best Viral Song
4	El Alfa	Best Urban Dominican Artist (3), Best New Artist
4	Greeicy	Best Female Artist (2), Best Pop Artist, Best Collaboration
4	Juanes	Best Rock Artist (3), Gold Award
4	Ovy on the Drums	Producer of the Year (2), Best Collaboration, Best Viral Song
4	Sebastian Yatra	Best Pop Artist (2), Best New Artist, Best Andean Artist
3	Carlos Vives	Best Tropical Artist (2), Gold Award
3	Dj Adoni	DJ of the Year
3	Elena Rose	Best New Artist, Best Pop Artist, Composer of the Year
3	Víctor Manuelle	Best Tropical Artist (2), Engagement Award
