= Vibras =

2018 studio album by J Balvin

Studio album by J Balvin
- Released: 25 May 2018
- Genres: Reggaeton; pop
- Length: 43:44
- Language: Spanish
- Label: Universal Latin
- Producers: ChildsPlay; Chuckie; Gaby Music; Jeday; Sky; Tainy; Willy William

J Balvin chronology
Energia (2016)	Vibras (2018)	Oasis (2019)

Singles from Vibras
- 1. "Mi Gente" Released: 30 June 2017; 2. "Machika" Released: 19 January 2018; 3. "Ahora" Released: 26 February 2018; 4. "Ambiente" Released: 13 April 2018; 5. "No Es Justo" Released: 11 May 2018

Vibras (transl. Vibes) is the third studio album by Colombian reggaeton singer J Balvin released on 25 May 2018 through Universal Latin. The album was promoted with five singles, including the international hit, "Mi Gente", which was released as the lead single of the album.

== Development ==
Even though you don't understand what I’m saying, you are going to really feel it. The same thing happened to me when I used to listen to English music. I didn't even understand one word. You know? But, it just makes me feel great.

— Balvin talking to NBC News about the fact that album was completely done in Spanish

In June 2017, Balvin together with French producer and DJ Willy William released the single, "Mi Gente". The song became a major commercial success reaching number one in over thirty countries worldwide, including number three on the US Billboard Hot 100 chart; it stayed on the chart for 35 consecutive weeks. According to Balvin he developed the concept for the album from the moment "Mi Gente" started "connecting with audiences around the world", wanting to make a fusion of different world beats and rhythms and refine the reggaeton music.

In an interview with Ebro Darden for Beats 1 Radio on Apple Music in April 2018, Balvin described the sound of the record as 33% dancehall, 33% R&B, and 33% reggaeton. Balvin further elaborated that a lot of love was put into the album's work and that contains different vibes, hence the name, Vibras, "The real meaning of this album was what's going on with Spanish music that's going so global, the fact that we did an album that the beats are so amazing that you don't have to understand what we say, you just have to love the songs."

Talking to NBC News Balvin explained how the core of the album is still the reggaeton, but according to him you can present the genre "in a way that people that don't know reggaeton or don't understand it, they would feel great." The singer further elaborated that he went back to his roots, but also "added some extra spice to it". Apart from William, the album features multiple other collaborators including the reggaeton duos Wisin & Yandel and Zion & Lennox, Brazilian singer Anitta, Mexican indie-pop musician Carla Morrison, flamenco singer Rosalía and Aruban singer Jeon.

== Critical reception ==
Professional ratings
Aggregate scores
Source	Rating
Metacritic	80/100
Review scores
Source	Rating
AllMusic	5/5 stars
The Guardian	4/5 stars
Pitchfork	8/10
Rolling Stone	3.5/5 stars

Vibras received generally favorable reviews from music critics. At Metacritic, which assigns a normalized rating out of 100 to reviews from mainstream critics, the album received an average score of 80 based on 4 reviews. Thom Jurek of AllMusic described Vibras as Balvin's attempt to reach English-speaking audience without singing in English. He wrote that the singer's ambition on the record is "grand" and further called it more "consistent" and "varied" than his previous album, Energia (2016), "its songwriting, performances, and production are truly inspired, making for an utterly compelling listen and one of the essential soundtracks of summer." Juana Giaimo of The Guardian gave the album four out of five stars commending its production, lyrics and Balvin's vocals. She also praised the sound of the reggaeton music on the album calling it "smooth" and "sensual", "tracks such as this still make Vibras perfect as a party playlist, but confirm that the noisy style of early reggaeton hits such as Daddy Yankee's 'Gasolina' is slowly being left behind." Rolling Stone's Will Hermes stated that Vibras "happens to be a pan-Latin masterstroke of its own, a set of primo Spanish-language pop with vibe deep enough to make it universal."

Raisa Bruner of Time magazine named Vibras the fifth best album of 2018, writing "[J Balvin] has carved out a space in mainstream music on his own terms; he makes no concessions for English speakers, instead serving up a colorful tour of Latin America's hottest musical trends." Billboard ranked it at number nine on their year-end list.

== Commercial performance ==
Vibras achieved the highest first-week streams for a Latin album on Apple Music globally, replacing Romeo Santos' 2017 album Golden. It also claimed the record for the most-streamed Latin album in 24 hours on the streaming platform for 2018. In the United States, it debuted at number one on the Top Latin Albums chart for the issue dated 9 June 2018. According to Nielsen Music, the record sold 22,000 album-equivalent units and became Balvin's second number-one album on the chart, following Energia in 2016. Out of the starting sum, 10,000 were in traditional album sales, which marked the second largest sales week of 2018, behind only CNCO's self-titled album that sold 13,000 copies. Additionally, Vibras scored the largest streaming week ever for a Latin album by an artist; its songs were streamed 16.1 million times. Subsequently, it debuted at number 15 on the US Billboard 200 and became his highest-charting album on the chart.

== Promotion ==
To further promote the album, Balvin began The Vibras Tour in Mexico City, Mexico on 26 May 2018.

== Track listing ==
Vibras track listing
No.	Title	Writer(s)	Producer(s)	Length
1.	"Vibras" (featuring Carla Morrison)	José Osorio; Marco Masis; Carla Morrison; Alejandro Ramirez	Tainy; Sky	1:06
2.	"Mi Gente" (with Willy William)	Osorio; Willy William; Adam Assad; Andrés David Restrepo; Mohombi Nzasi Moupondo	William	3:05
3.	"Ambiente"	Osorio; Masis; Justin Quiles; Ramirez; Jose Angel Rodriguez	Tainy; Sky	4:09
4.	"Cuando Tú Quieras"	Osorio; Jesús Manuel Nieves Cortes; Masis; Rodriguez	Tainy; Sky	3:25
5.	"No Es Justo" (featuring Zion & Lennox)	Osorio; Nieves; Félix Ortiz; Gabriel Pizarro; Masis; Ramirez	Tainy; Sky	4:11
6.	"Ahora"	Osorio; Nieves; Masis; Ramirez	Tainy; Sky	4:15
7.	"Brillo" (featuring Rosalía)	Osorio; Nieves; Masis; Ramirez; Rosalía Vila	Tainy; Sky	2:40
8.	"En Mí (Interlude)"	Osorio; Ramirez; Vila	Tainy; Sky	0:54
9.	"En Mí"	Osorio; Nieves; Ramirez	Tainy; Sky	3:16
10.	"Peligrosa" (featuring Wisin & Yandel)	Osorio; Chris Jeday; Luis E. Ortiz Rivera; Juan Luis Morera Luna; Llandel Veguilla Malavé	Gaby Music; Jeday	3:22
11.	"Noches Pasadas"	Osorio; Nieves; Masis; Ramirez	Tainy; Sky	3:42
12.	"Tu Verdad"	Osorio; Masis; Ramirez	Tainy; Sky	3:25
13.	"Dónde Estarás"	Osorio; Masis; Ramirez	Tainy; Sky	3:12
14.	"Machika" (with Jeon and Anitta)	Osorio; Larissa Machado; Alejandro Ramírez; Clyde Sergio Narain; Jonathan Bryan Thiel	Chuckie; ChildsPlay	3:10
Total length:				43:44

Japanese edition bonus tracks
No.	Title	Writer(s)	Producer(s)	Length
15.	"Positivo" (with Michael Brun)	Osorio	Brun	2:53
16.	"Ginza"	Osorio; Ramírez; Rene Cano; Alejandro Patiño; Feid	Ramírez; Patiño	2:51
17.	"Safari" (featuring Pharrell Williams, BIA and Sky)	Osorio; Pharrell Williams; Bianca Landrau; Ramírez; Jesse Huerta	Pharrell Williams	3:25
18.	"Bobo"	Osorio; Ramírez; Cano; Patiño	Ramírez; Patiño	3:29
Total length:				56:29

== Personnel ==
Credits adapted from AllMusic and Tidal.

=== Performance ===
- J Balvin – vocals
- Anitta – vocals
- Jeon – vocals
- Lennox – vocals
- Wisin – vocals
- Yandel – vocals
- Zion – vocals
- Rosalía – vocals
- Carla Morrison – vocals
- Willy William – vocals

=== Technical ===
- ChildsPlay – production
- DJ Chuckie – production
- Marcos "Tainy" Masis – production
- Luis Miguel Pardo – production
- Alejandro "Sky" Ramírez – production
- Chris Jeday – production
- Willy William – vocals production
- Hunter Jackson – assistance
- Antonio “Dj Fuse” Olivera – Recording
- Phil Greiss – mixing
- Josh Gudwin – mixing
- Dave Kutch – mastering

=== Miscellaneous ===
- Orli Arias – photography
- Luis Bañuelos – design
- Oscar Botello – creative direction, design
- Kris Buhidar – design

== Charts ==
=== Weekly charts ===
Chart (2018)	Peak position
Belgian Albums (Ultratop Flanders)	96
Belgian Albums (Ultratop Wallonia)	119
Canadian Albums (Billboard)	40
French Albums (SNEP)	79
Dutch Albums (Album Top 100)	28
Italian Albums (FIMI)	47
Spanish Albums (PROMUSICAE)	62
Swedish Albums (Sverigetopplistan)	50
Swiss Albums (Schweizer Hitparade)	20
US Billboard 200	15
US Top Latin Albums (Billboard)	1
US Latin Rhythm Albums (Billboard)	1

=== Year-end charts ===
Chart (2018)	Position
US Top Latin Albums (Billboard)	3
Chart (2019)	Position
US Top Latin Albums (Billboard)	7
Chart (2020)	Position
US Top Latin Albums (Billboard)	25
Chart (2021)	Position
US Top Latin Albums (Billboard)	38

== Certifications ==
Region	Certification	Certified units/sales
Brazil (Pro-Música Brasil)	Diamond	160,000^{‡}
Canada (Music Canada)	Platinum	80,000^{‡}
France (SNEP)	Gold	50,000^{‡}
Italy (FIMI)	Gold	25,000^{‡}
Mexico (AMPROFON)	3× Platinum+Gold	210,000^{‡}
Poland (ZPAV)	Gold	10,000^{‡}
United States (RIAA)	17× Platinum (Latin)	1,020,000^{‡}
^{‡} Sales+streaming figures based on certification alone.

== Release history ==
List of release dates, showing region, formats, labels and references
Region	Date	Formats	Labels	Ref.
Various	25 May 2018	CD; digital download; streaming	Universal Latin	
Japan	11 July 2018	CD	Universal Music Japan	
