= 2021 Heat Latin Music Awards =

2021 music awards ceremony

- Date: July 1, 2021
- Location: Cap Cana; Punta Cana, Dominican Republic
- Hosted by: Kunno; Melina Ramírez

Highlights
- Most wins: Anitta (2); Myke Towers (2)
- Most nominations: Karol G (6)
- Website: premiosheat.com

Television/radio coverage
- Network: HTV

The 2021 Heat Latin Music Awards were held on July 1, 2021, at Cap Cana in Punta Cana, Dominican Republic, celebrating the best of Latin music in its sixth edition. The ceremony was broadcast live from HTV, and was hosted by Kunno and Melina Ramírez. Karol G received the most nominations on the ceremony, being nominated for six awards. Myke Towers and Anitta won the most awards of the ceremony with 2 awards each.

Gloria Trevi was honored with the Engagement Award for her social work with her "Ana Dalai Foundation", Wisin was honored with the Gold Artist Award, Anitta with the Feminine Empowerment Award and Arcángel & Wilkins were honored for they artistic career.

== Winners and nominees ==
Winners are listed first and in bold.

Best Male Artist	Best Female Artist
**Nicky Jam**; Camilo; Maluma; J Balvin; Prince Royce; Farruko; Ozuna; Bad Bunny	**Danna Paola**; Rosalía; Karol G; Greeicy; Farina; Kali Uchis; Natti Natasha; Anitta; Nathy Peluso
Best Band or Group	Best Rock Artist
**CNCO**; Reik; Piso 21; Morat; Zion & Lennox; Gente de Zona; Mau y Ricky	**Morat**; Mon Laferte; Jorge Drexler; Juanes; Los Amigos Invisibles; Zoé; Fito Paez; Diamante Eléctrico
Best Pop Artist	Best Urban Artist
**Camilo**; Luis Fonsi; Ricardo Montaner; Greeicy; Sebastián Yatra; Carlos Rivera; Natti Natasha; Aitana; Luis Figueroa	**Karol G**; Bad Bunny; J Balvin; Nicky Jam; Arcángel; Ozuna; Farruko; Anuel AA; Farina; Myke Towers; Rauw Alejandro
Best Tropical Artist	Best Región Sur Artist
**Prince Royce**; N'Klabe; Kalimete; Víctor Manuelle; Carlos Vives; Romeo Santos; Gabriel Pagán; Marc Anthony	**Anitta**; Nathy Peluso; Nicki Nicole; Paloma Mami; Cazzu; Khea; Yahaira Plasencia
Best Región Andina Artist	Best Región Norte Artist
**Farina**; Mike Bahía; Sebastián Yatra; Nacho; Manuel Turizo; Danny Ocean; Evaluna Montaner; Micro TDH	**Lunay**; Farruko; El Alfa; Danna Paola; Sech; Milly; Justin Quiles
Best New Artist	Most Promising Act
**Boza**; Natanael Cano; Guaynaa; Jay Wheeler; Alex Rose; Jessi Uribe; Nicki Nicole; Nathy Peluso	**Juan de Dios Pantoja**; Kenia Os; Katie Angel; Emilia Mernes; Juhn; Amy Gutiérrez; Alejandro Santamarina; Jay Menez; Mora
Influencer of the Year	Best Regional Popular Artist
**Kimberly Loaiza**; Kunno; Luisa Fernanda W; Mario Ruiz; El Chombo; Marko; Mr. Zeo; Molusco	**Paola Jara**; Christian Nodal; Jessi Uribe; Pipe Bueno; Los Ángeles Azules; Yeison Jimenez; Carin León; Edwin Luna y La Trakalosa de Monterrey
Best Video	Best Collaboration
**Wisin, Myke Towers & Maluma (feat. Anitta) – "Mi Niña Remix"**; Karol G, Anuel AA & J Balvin – "LOCATION"; Daddy Yankee – "Problema"; Camilo & Evaluna Montaner – "Machu Picchu"; Karol G - "BICHOTA"; Bad Bunny & Rosalía – "LA NOCHE DE ANOCHE"; Anuel AA & Ozuna - "Los Dioses"; J Balvin - "Rojo"	**Rochy RD, Myke Towers & Nicki Nicole – "Ella No Es Tuya"**; Bad Bunny & Jhay Cortez – "Dákiti"; Myke Towers & Juhn – "Bandido"; Arcángel & Farina – "La Boca"; Karol G - BICHOTA; Victor Emanuelle & La India – "Víctimas Las Dos"; Natti Natasha & Prince Royce – "Antes Que Salga El Sol"; Myke Towers, Jay Wheeler & DJ Nelson – "La Curiosidad"; Daddy Yankee & Marc Anthony – "De Vuelta Pa' La Vuelta"; Camilo & El Alfa – "Bebé"; Lele Pons & Guaynaa – "Se Te Nota"; Ovy On The Drums (feat. Karol G & Danny Ocean – "Miedito O Qué?"
Best Urbano Dominican Artist
**El Alfa**; Natti Natasha; Rochy RD; Químico Ultra Mega; Mozart La Para; La Insuperable; Kiko El Crazy; Chimbala
