= Salón Metropolitano =

Argentine expo facility

Metropolitano
- Address: 501 Junín
- Location: Rosario, Santa Fe; Argentina

Construction
- Opened: 2007

Website
- http://metropolitanoros.com.ar/

The Salón Metropolitano (or Teatro Metropolitano, or simply "Metropolitano") is a convention and exhibition center inside the Alto Rosario Shopping Center in downtown Rosario, Argentina, located at 501 Junín Street.

The 54,000-square-foot (5,000 m^{2}) building offers six different rooms for a range of concerts, meetings, banquets and classes, depending on size. The banquet and ballroom can accommodate over 5,000 people; in 2007, the main theatre and performance hall was greatly expanded, increasing the capacity from 3,200 to 10,000.

== Rooms ==
The facility can be sub-divided into six new rooms.

Room name	Area	Capacity			
Room name	Area	Theatre	Meetings	Banquets	Classroom
Metropolitano 1	1,960 m2	2,400	2,400	1,700	—N/a
Metropolitano 2	2,475 m2	3,200	3,500	2,200	—N/a
Independencia	720 m2	950	240	550	—N/a
Libertad	427 m2	500	500	280	100
Panorámico	400 m2	500	500	280	100
Contemporáneo	380 m2	500	500	280	100

== Concerts ==
The following is a list of the most notable performances:

- Violetta — 6–7 October 2013 — Violetta en Vivo
- Ricky Martin — 6–7 March and 2 November 2016 — One World Tour
- Maluma — 23 June and 9 December 9 2016 — Pretty Boy, Dirty Boy World Tour
- Jesse & Joy — 18 September 2016
- Lali — 6 October 2016 — Soy Tour
- J Balvin — 22 November 2018 — Vibras Tour
