= Energia (album) =

Energía

Studio album by J Balvin
- Released: June 24, 2016
- Genre: Reggaeton
- Length: 48:47
- Label: Capitol Latin; Universal

J Balvin chronology
La Familia B Sides (2014)	Energía (2016)	Vibras (2018)

Singles from Energía
- 1. "Ginza" Released: July 17, 2015; 2. "Bobo" Released: May 6, 2016; 3. "Safari" Released: June 17, 2016; 4. "Sigo Extrañándote" Released: February 17, 2017

Professional ratings
Review scores
Source	Rating
AllMusic	3.5/5 stars

Energía is the second studio album by Colombian singer J Balvin. It was released on June 24, 2016, by Capitol Latin and Universal Music Group. Balvin received a nomination for the Lo Nuestro Award for Urban Album of the Year.

== Commercial performance ==
Energía debuted at number 38 on the Billboard 200, with 12,000 equivalent album units; selling 7,000 copies in its first week. The album was the first Balvin's album to debut at number one on the Billboard Top Latin Albums.

=== Accolades ===
Energia was listed number four on Rolling Stone's 10 Best Latin albums of 2016, with the reviewer calling the album Balvin's "breakthrough" continuing to praise the album's lead single "Ginza", stating "with its deliciously liquid beat, is among the finest three minutes in reggaetón history."

Publication	Accolade	Year	Rank
Billboard	Billboard's 50 Best Albums of 2016	2016	24
Rolling Stone	Best Latin Album of 2016	2016	4

== Track listing ==
Energía — Standard version
No.	Title	Length
1.	"Veneno"	2:29
2.	"Malvada"	2:58
3.	"Safari" (featuring Pharrell Williams, BIA and Sky)	3:25
4.	"Bobo"	3:29
5.	"Sigo Extrañándote"	3:21
6.	"Primera Cita"	2:54
7.	"Pierde Los Modales" (featuring Daddy Yankee)	3:21
8.	"Por Un Día"	3:31
9.	"No Hay Título"	2:43
10.	"Acércate" (featuring Yandel)	3:12
11.	"Snapchat"	3:39
12.	"Hola"	3:16
13.	"Ginza"	2:51
14.	"Solitario"	3:27
15.	"35 Pa Las 12" (Fuego featuring J Balvin)	4:06

Energía — Brazilian edition
No.	Title	Length
16.	"Ginza (Anitta Remix)" (featuring Anitta)	2:49
17.	"Tranquila" (duet with Projota)	3:21

Energía Lado B
No.	Title	Length
16.	"Fiesta"	3:09

Energía — Pepsi Music Proximity Exclusive
No.	Title	Length
1.	"Fiesta"	3:09
2.	"Piénsame"	3:25
3.	"Decídete"	3:09
4.	"Pa´mi"	2:48
5.	"Energía"	2:45
6.	"Personal"	2:41

== Charts ==
=== Weekly charts ===
Chart (2016)	Peak position
Belgian Albums (Ultratop Wallonia)	187
Mexican Albums (AMPROFON)	1
Spanish Albums (Promusicae)	44
Swiss Albums (Schweizer Hitparade)	49
US Billboard 200	38
US Top Latin Albums (Billboard)	1
US Latin Rhythm Albums (Billboard)	1

=== Year-end charts ===
Chart (2016)	Position
Mexican Albums (AMPROFON)	70
US Top Latin Albums (Billboard)	10
Chart (2017)	Position
US Top Latin Albums (Billboard)	3
Chart (2018)	Position
US Top Latin Albums (Billboard)	14
Chart (2019)	Position
US Top Latin Albums (Billboard)	30

== Certifications and sales ==
Region	Certification	Certified units/sales
Brazil (Pro-Música Brasil)	Gold	20,000^{‡}
Canada	—	11,000
Chile (IFPI Chile)	Platinum	
Colombia (ASINCOL)	5× Platinum	
Italy (FIMI)	Gold	25,000^{‡}
Mexico (AMPROFON)	Diamond+Gold	330,000^{‡}
United States (RIAA)	4× Platinum (Latin)	240,000^{‡}
^{‡} Sales+streaming figures based on certification alone.

== Energia Tour ==
Energía Tour
- Tour by J Balvin
- Associated album: Energia
- Start date: September 29, 2016
- End date: January 28, 2018
- Legs: 7
- No. of shows: 44 in North America; 17 in Europe; 14 in South America; 1 in Asia; 76 in Total

J Balvin concert chronology
- La Familia Tour (2013–16); Energía Tour (2016–18); Vibras Tour (2018)

Balvin embarked on the Energia Tour in order to support the album. The tour began on September 29, 2016, in Culiacán and concluded on January 28, 2018, in London.

=== Set list ===
This set list is representative of the show on February 25, 2017, in Viña del Mar, Chile. It is not representative of all concerts for the duration of the tour.

1. "Ginza"
2. "Safari"
3. "Tranquila"
4. "Bobo"
5. "Yo Te Lo Dije"
6. "Sin Compromiso"
7. "Sorry (Latino Remix)"
8. "6 AM"
9. "Otra Vez"
10. "Ay Vamos"
11. "Snapchat"
12. "Travesuras"
13. "Lean On (Remix)"
14. "Pierde los Modales"
15. "Sigo Extrañándote"
16. "Acércate"

=== Tour dates ===
List of concerts, showing date, city, country, venue, opening acts, tickets sold, number of available tickets and amount of gross revenue
Date	City	Country	Venue	Attendance	Revenue
Latin America – Leg 1
September 29, 2016	Culiacán	Mexico	Foro Tecate	—N/a	—N/a
September 30, 2016	Hermosillo	Mexico	Expo Forum	—N/a	—N/a
October 29, 2016 (Note: The concert of October 29, 2016 in Belén was part of the 2016 Haunter Fair.)	Belén	Costa Rica	Centro de Convenciones Pedregal	—N/a	—N/a
November 1, 2016 (Note: The concert of November 1, 2016 in Guadalajara was part of the 2016 Fiestas de Octubre.)	Guadalajara	Mexico	Auditorio Benito Juárez	—N/a	—N/a
North America – Leg 2
November 5, 2016 (Note: The concert of November 5, 2016 in Miami was part of the iHeartRadio Fiesta Latina.)	Miami	United States	AmericanAirlines Arena	—N/a	—N/a
Europe – Leg 3
November 8, 2016	Amsterdam	Netherlands	Paradiso	—N/a	—N/a
November 10, 2016	Milan	Italy	Fabrique	—N/a	—N/a
November 11, 2016	Dietikon	Switzerland	Stadthalle	—N/a	—N/a
November 12, 2016	Cologne	Germany	Essigfabrik	—N/a	—N/a
November 13, 2016	London	United Kingdom	Shepherd's Bush Empire	—N/a	—N/a
Latin America / North America – Leg 4
November 25, 2016 (Note: The concert of November 25, 2016 in Lima was part of the VIII Juntos en Concierto.)	Lima	Peru	Jockey Club del Perú	—N/a	—N/a
November 26, 2016	Medellín	Colombia	Centro de Eventos La Macarena	—N/a	—N/a
January 20, 2017 (Note: The concert of NJanuary 20, 2017 in Mar del Plata was part of the 2017 Smile Festival.)	Mar del Plata	Argentina	Mute – Club del Mar	—N/a	—N/a
February 25, 2017 (Note: The concert of February 25, 2017 in Viña del Mar was part of the LVIII Viña del Mar International Song Festival.)	Viña del Mar	Chile	Quinta Vergara Amphitheater	—N/a	—N/a
March 18, 2017	San Juan	Puerto Rico	José Miguel Agrelot Coliseum	4,965 / 5,641	$315,923
March 19, 2017 (Note: The concert of March 19, 2017 in Los Angeles was part of the 2017 L Festival.)	Pico Rivera	United States	Pico Rivera Sports Arena	—N/a	—N/a
April 6, 2017 (Note: The concert of April 6, 2017 in Puebla was part of the 2017 Feria de Puebla.)	Puebla City	Mexico	Centro Expositor Los Fuertes	—N/a	—N/a
April 8, 2017	Mexico City	Mexico	National Auditorium	9,620 / 9,620	$313,802
April 11, 2017 (Note: The concerts of April 11, 12 and 13, 2017 in Guatemala were part of the 2017 Pepsi's Refrescante Tour.)	Guatemala City	Guatemala	Explanada Cayalá	—N/a	—N/a
April 12, 2017	Retalhuleu	Guatemala	Irtra Retalhuleu	—N/a	—N/a
April 13, 2017	Puerto San José	Guatemala	Autopista Puerto Quetzal	—N/a	—N/a
April 15, 2017 (Note: The concert of April 15, 2017 in Tela was part of the 2017 Pepsi's Refrescante Tour.)	Tela	Honduras	La Ensenada Beach Resort	—N/a	—N/a
April 21, 2017 (Note: The concerts of April 21, 2017 in Medellín was part of Jumbo Concierto.)	Medellín	Colombia	Centro de Eventos La Macarena	—N/a	—N/a
April 22, 2017 (Note: The concerts of April 22, 2017 in Bogotá was part of Jumbo Concierto.)	Bogotá	Colombia	Simón Bolívar Park	—N/a	—N/a
April 23, 2017 (Note: The concert of April 20, 2017 in Miami was part of the 2017 Miami Bash.)	Miami	United States	AmericanAirlines Arena		
Europe – Leg 5
May 10, 2017	Rome	Italy	Atlantico Live	—N/a	—N/a
May 12, 2017	Munich	Germany	Tonhalle	—N/a	—N/a
May 13, 2017	Geneva	Switzerland	Geneve Arena	—N/a	—N/a
May 15, 2017	Berlin	Germany	Columbiahalle	—N/a	—N/a
May 16, 2017	Oberhausen	Germany	Turbinenhalle	—N/a	—N/a
May 17, 2017	Brussels	Belgium	Forest National	—N/a	—N/a
May 19, 2017	Paris	France	L'Olympia	—N/a	—N/a
May 21, 2017	Barcelona	Spain	Sant Jordi Club	—N/a	—N/a
May 22, 2017	Madrid	Spain	WiZink Center	—N/a	—N/a
Asia – Leg 7
May 24, 2017	Ra'anana	Israel	Raanana Park Amphitheater	—N/a	—N/a
North America – Leg 7
May 27, 2017 (Note: The concerts of May 27, 2017 in El Paso was part of the 2017 Neon Desert Music Festival.)	El Paso	United States	Downtown El Paso	—N/a	—N/a
May 28, 2017 (Note: The concerts of May 28, 2017 in Las Vegas was part of the Concert on the Beach.)	Las Vegas	United States	Mandalay Bay Beach	4,529 / 4,529	$193,617
Latin America – Leg 8
July 1, 2017 (Note: The concert of July 1, 2017 in Santiago is with Nicky Jam.)	Santiago	Chile	Movistar Arena	14,893 / 14,974	$730,114
July 29, 2017 (Note: The concert of July 29, 2017 in Monterrey is part of the 2017 Cabuland.)	Monterrey	Mexico	Parque Ferrocarrilero	—N/a	—N/a
August 3, 2017	Panama City	Panama	Roberto Durán Arena	—N/a	—N/a
August 5, 2017 (Note: The concert of August 5, 2017 in Santa Cruz is part of the Bolivia 360 Music Festival.)	Santa Cruz	Bolivia	Estadio Ramón Tahuichi Aguilera	—N/a	—N/a
August 9, 2017	Montevideo	Uruguay	Palacio Peñarol	—N/a	—N/a
August 10, 2017	Buenos Aires	Argentina	Luna Park	—N/a	—N/a
August 11, 2017	Córdoba	Argentina	Anfiteatro Jesús María	—N/a	—N/a
August 12, 2017	Asunción	Paraguay	Jockey Club del Paraguay	—N/a	—N/a
September 2, 2017 (Note: The concert of September 2, 2017 in Lima is part of the Lima Music Fest 2017.)	Lima	Peru	Jockey Club del Perú	—N/a	—N/a
North America
September 14, 2017	Fairfax	United States	EagleBank Arena	—N/a	—N/a
September 15, 2017	Boston	United States	Wang Theatre	3,011 / 3,531	$213,168
September 16, 2017	New York City	United States	The Theater at MSG	5,276 / 5,276	$385,456
September 20, 2017	Detroit	United States	The Fillmore Detroit	—N/a	—N/a
September 21, 2017	Rosemont	United States	Rosemont Theatre	—N/a	—N/a
September 23, 2017	Milwaukee	United States	Riverside Theatre	—N/a	—N/a
September 24, 2017	Omaha	United States	Ralston Arena	—N/a	—N/a
September 28, 2017	Houston	United States	Club Escapade	—N/a	—N/a
September 29, 2017	Hidalgo	United States	State Farm Arena	—N/a	—N/a
September 30, 2017	San Antonio	United States	Aztec Theatre	—N/a	—N/a
October 1, 2017	Grand Prairie	United States	Verizon Theatre at Grand Prairie	—N/a	—N/a
October 5, 2017	San Jose	United States	City National Civic	—N/a	—N/a
October 6, 2017	Santa Ana	United States	The Observatory	—N/a	—N/a
October 7, 2017	Rancho Mirage	United States	The Show at Agua Caliente Casino	—N/a	—N/a
October 8, 2017	Los Angeles	United States	Microsoft Theater	6,856 / 6,856	$484,891
October 10, 2017	Atlanta	United States	Coca-Cola Ritz	—N/a	—N/a
October 11, 2017	Orlando	United States	Hard Rock Live	—N/a	—N/a
October 13, 2017	Miami	United States	American Airlines Arena	—N/a	—N/a
Latin America
October 21, 2017	Mexico City	Mexico	National Auditorium	9,620 / 9,620	$351,374
October 27, 2017	Guadalajara	Mexico	Telmex Auditorium	—N/a	—N/a
October 28, 2017	Cuernavaca	Mexico	Jardines de Mexico	—N/a	—N/a
November 1, 2017	Monterrey	Mexico	Arena Monterrey	—N/a	—N/a
November 2, 2017	Cabo San Lucas	Mexico	El Squid Roe	—N/a	—N/a
November 5, 2017 (Note: The concert of November 5, 2017 in Santo Domingo is part of the Festival Presidente.)	Santo Domingo	Dominican Republic	Estadio Olímpico Félix Sánchez	—N/a	—N/a
November 11, 2017	Tijuana	Mexico	Audirama El Trompo	—N/a	—N/a
November 18, 2017	Bucaramanga	Colombia	Plaza de Toros Señor de los Milagros	—N/a	—N/a
Europe				—N/a	—N/a
January 25, 2018	Paris	France	Zénith de Paris	—N/a	—N/a
January 26, 2018	Amsterdam	Netherlands	AFAS Live	—N/a	—N/a
January 28, 2018	London	United Kingdom	O_{2} Academy Brixton	—N/a	—N/a
Total				49,150 / 50,427	$2,636,971

=== Cancelled shows ===
List of cancelled concerts, showing date, city, country, venue and reason for cancellation
Date	City	Country	Venue	Reason/Additional Info
October 21, 2016	Chihuahua	Mexico	Estadio Manuel L. Almanza	Unknown
October 22, 2016	Ciudad Juárez	Mexico	Estadio Carta Blanca	Technical order issues
November 10, 2017	Mexicali	Mexico	Plaza de Toros Calafia	Breach of contract
