= Súper X (TV series) =

- Genre: Comedy
- Story by: Miguel Ángel Fox; Liliann Contreras; Israel Jiménez; Fercho Nolla; Alfredo Ballesteros
- Directed by: Fez Noriega
- Country of origin: Mexico
- Original language: Spanish
- No. of seasons: 2
- No. of episodes: 26

Production
- Executive producer: Miguel Ángel Fox
- Producer: Cuquis Razo

Original release
- Network: Blim
- Release: January 20, 2017 – February 4, 2018

Súper X is a Mexican comedy television series produced by Miguel Ángel Fox for Blim. The first season was released on January 20, 2017. A second season has been confirmed.

Super X tells the story of Alex a normal guy, who works in a video game store, lives with his mother, has bad luck with women and spends time with two friends who are his worst advisers: Lalo, an eccentric and privileged young man whose dream is to be a recognized actor, and Simon, his spotted and plump cousin.

== Synopsis ==
As a result of an unfortunate accident, Alex acquires powers, however, he will continue to lead the same life of loser with his friends Lalo and Simón, while trying to conquer without much success Vicky, his platonic love.

== Cast ==
- Axel Ricco as Alex
- Mauricio Llera as Lalo
- Paco Rueda as Simón
- Michelle Renaud as Vicky
- Claudia Ramírez as Ofelia
- Regina Blandón as Tatiana
- Mavi Navarro as Nina
- Mariluz Bermúdez as Laura "Madame Frida"
- Manuel "Flaco" Ibáñez as "La Cigarra carmesi"

== Episodes ==
=== Series overview ===
Season	Episodes	Originally released	
Season	Episodes	First released	Last released
1	13	January 20, 2017	
2	13	January 1, 2018	February 4, 2018

=== Season 1 (2017) ===
No. overall	No. in season	Title	Original release date
1	1	"Súper X"	January 20, 2017
Between his horrible job, his next baldness and the crisis of the thirties, Alex is about to go crazy. However, during a stormy afternoon a lightning strikes him that leaves him on the brink of death and upon awakening, his life will never be the same.
2	2	"Este es mi nuevo poder"	January 20, 2017
Alex decides to buy a car to conquer Vicky, however, he burns with his strange powers the few savings he has. Lalo gives him some advice that will put him in serious trouble.
3	3	"¿Dónde está mi cara?"	January 20, 2017
At last Alex takes courage and makes a date with Vicky, but to his disgrace, his invisibility power is present. The situation gets pretty scary because Lalo and Simon just want to play pranks, while Alex just wants to see the love of his life.
4	4	"Si Alex, eres indestructible"	January 20, 2017
Alex plans to make a party to see Vicky, however, during the preparations for the party, Lalo and Simon run over Alex and realize that his friend has a new power: he is indestructible.
5	5	"¡Hola soy Nina!"	January 20, 2017
The new power of Alex makes him remember Nina, the first girl who he asked out, so Lalo decides to find her on Facebook and put together a reunion. However, the surprise will be taken by someone else.
6	6	"Trágame tierra"	January 20, 2017
Alex receives a letter from a secret admirer, meanwhile, Simon is very disappointed by his bad fortune in love and tries to get a talent to get him out of his bad streak.
7	7	"Llegó la nueva jefa"	January 20, 2017
Alex realizes that she can read people's thoughts, but everything gets complicated when he learns that Nina is his new boss and that he can hear all the things she thinks of him.
8	8	"No tengo chichis, si tengo chicis"	January 20, 2017
Alex realizes that his new power is to become a woman, so desperate asks Lalo for help, but things get out of control, when Vicky invites him to a pajama party for girls.
9	9	"Esto ya lo viví"	January 20, 2017
Alex decides to tell Vicky how he feels about her, but it's all a disaster. Fortunately, his new power gives him the opportunity to do it again.
10	10	"La teoría de la acumulación"	January 20, 2017
Simon and Lalo tell Alex that Vicky only sees him as her gay friend, he refuses to accept the theory of his friends and misunderstands her invitation to go to her apartment.
11	11	"Este cuerpo no es mío"	January 20, 2017
In spite of his labor disappointments, Lalo manages to enter the recording of the new video of J Balvin. Thanks to the new power that Alex has acquired, Simon becomes a famous star.
12	12	"No te quieres casar conmigo"	January 20, 2017
Alex is sick of his work and decides to quit, but Nina misunderstands things and thinks that he is declaring his love to her. Now, Nina is completely obsessed and begins with the preparations for her wedding with Alex.
13	13	"¡No manches, son zombies!"	January 20, 2017
Alex has an opportunity that he can not pass up, declare his love to Vicky, but to vary things will not be easy. Now he will have to face a horde of zombies, which he himself has created with his new power.

=== Season 2 (2018) ===
No. overall	No. in season	Title	Original release date
14	1	"Alex, Vicky, whisky o cerveza"	January 1, 2018
15	2	"Alex es súper gracioso"	January 1, 2018
16	3	"Papá mío"	January 1, 2018
17	4	"Todos somos familia"	January 8, 2018
18	5	"Alex y sus amores perros"	January 8, 2018
19	6	"Así es la vida"	January 15, 2018
20	7	"Súper pequeño"	January 15, 2018
21	8	"Congelados"	January 21, 2018
22	9	"Alex puede volar"	January 21, 2018
23	10	"Romeo y Frida"	January 28, 2018
24	11	"Huracán"	January 28, 2018
25	12	"Separación de bienes"	February 4, 2018
26	13	"El poder final"	February 4, 2018
