= Ahora (J Balvin song) =

Single by J Balvin

from the album Vibras
- Language: Spanish
- English title: "Now"
- Released: 26 February 2018
- Length: 4:14
- Label: Universal Latin
- Songwriter(s): José Osorio; Jesús Manuel Nieves Cortes; Marco Masis; Alejandro Rodriguez
- Producer(s): Tainy; Sky

J Balvin singles chronology
"Machika" (2018)	"Ahora" (2018)	"X" (2018)

Music video
- "Ahora" on YouTube

"Ahora" (English: Now) is a song recorded by Colombian reggaeton singer J Balvin for his studio album, Vibras (2018). It was written and produced by Marco "Tainy" Masis and Alejandro "Sky" Ramirez with an additional writing done by Balvin and Jesús Manuel Nieves Cortes.

== Charts ==
Chart (2018)	Peak position
Colombia (National-Report)	45
Spain (PROMUSICAE)	27
US Hot Latin Songs (Billboard)	27

== Certifications ==
Region	Certification	Certified units/sales
Brazil (Pro-Música Brasil)	Gold	20,000^{‡}
Spain (PROMUSICAE)	Gold	20,000^{‡}
^{‡} Sales+streaming figures based on certification alone.
