= Safari (J Balvin song) =

Single by J Balvin featuring Pharrell Williams, Bia and Sky

from the album Energía
- Language: Spanish
- Released: 17 June 2016
- Genre: Alternative reggaeton; dancehall
- Length: 3:25
- Label: Capitol Latin
- Songwriters: José Osorio; Pharrell Williams; Bianca Landrau; Alejandro Ramírez; Jesse Huerta
- Producer: Pharrell Williams

J Balvin singles chronology
"Bobo" (2016)	"Safari" (2016)	"Si Tú Novio Te Deja Sola" (2017)

Pharrell Williams singles chronology
"WTF (Where They From)" (2015)	"Safari" (2016)	"Surfin'" (2016)

Music video
- "Safari" on YouTube

"Safari" is a song by Colombian singer J Balvin featuring American musicians Pharrell Williams and Bia and Colombian musician Sky. Written by the artists alongside Jesse Huerta of Jesse & Joy, and produced Williams, the track was released by Capitol Latin on 17 June 2016 as the third single of his second studio album Energía (2016). The song reached number one in Mexico, Panama, and Spain.

This song also appeared on the soundtrack of the series Súper X in Este cuerpo no es mío.

== Reception ==
Pitchfork described the song as "a thrilling joint, driven by bongos and a snaking piano line".

== Charts ==
=== Weekly charts ===
Chart (2016–17)	Peak position
Argentina (Monitor Latino)	15
Argentina Digital Songs (CAPIF)	5
Chile (Monitor Latino)	10
Colombia (National-Report)	5
Dominican Republic (Monitor Latino)	8
Czech Republic Airplay (ČNS IFPI)	96
Ecuador (Monitor Latino)	3
Ecuador (National-Report)	7
France (SNEP)	132
Italy (FIMI)	26
Mexico (Monitor Latino)	1
Mexico (Billboard Mexican Airplay)	1
Romania (Airplay 100)	2
Panama (Monitor Latino)	1
Paraguay (Monitor Latino)	4
Portugal (AFP)	51
Spain (PROMUSICAE)	1
Switzerland (Schweizer Hitparade)	76
Uruguay (Monitor Latino)	4
US Bubbling Under Hot 100 (Billboard)	7
US Hot Latin Songs (Billboard)	3
US Latin Airplay (Billboard)	1
US Latin Rhythm Airplay (Billboard)	1

=== Monthly charts ===
Chart (2017)	Position
Peru (UNIMPRO)	1

=== Year-end charts ===
Chart (2016)	Position
Spain (PROMUSICAE)	55
US Hot Latin Songs (Billboard)	22

Chart (2017)	Position
Spain (PROMUSICAE)	37

== Certifications ==
Region	Certification	Certified units/sales
Brazil (Pro-Música Brasil)	Platinum	60,000^{‡}
France (SNEP)	Gold	100,000^{‡}
Italy (FIMI)	2× Platinum	100,000^{‡}
Mexico (AMPROFON)	Diamond+Platinum	360,000^{‡}
Portugal (AFP)	Gold	5,000^{‡}
Spain (Promusicae)	4× Platinum	160,000^{‡}
^{‡} Sales+streaming figures based on certification alone.

== See also ==
- List of number-one songs of 2016 (Mexico)
- List of Billboard number-one Latin songs of 2016
