= Cap Cana =

- Destination city
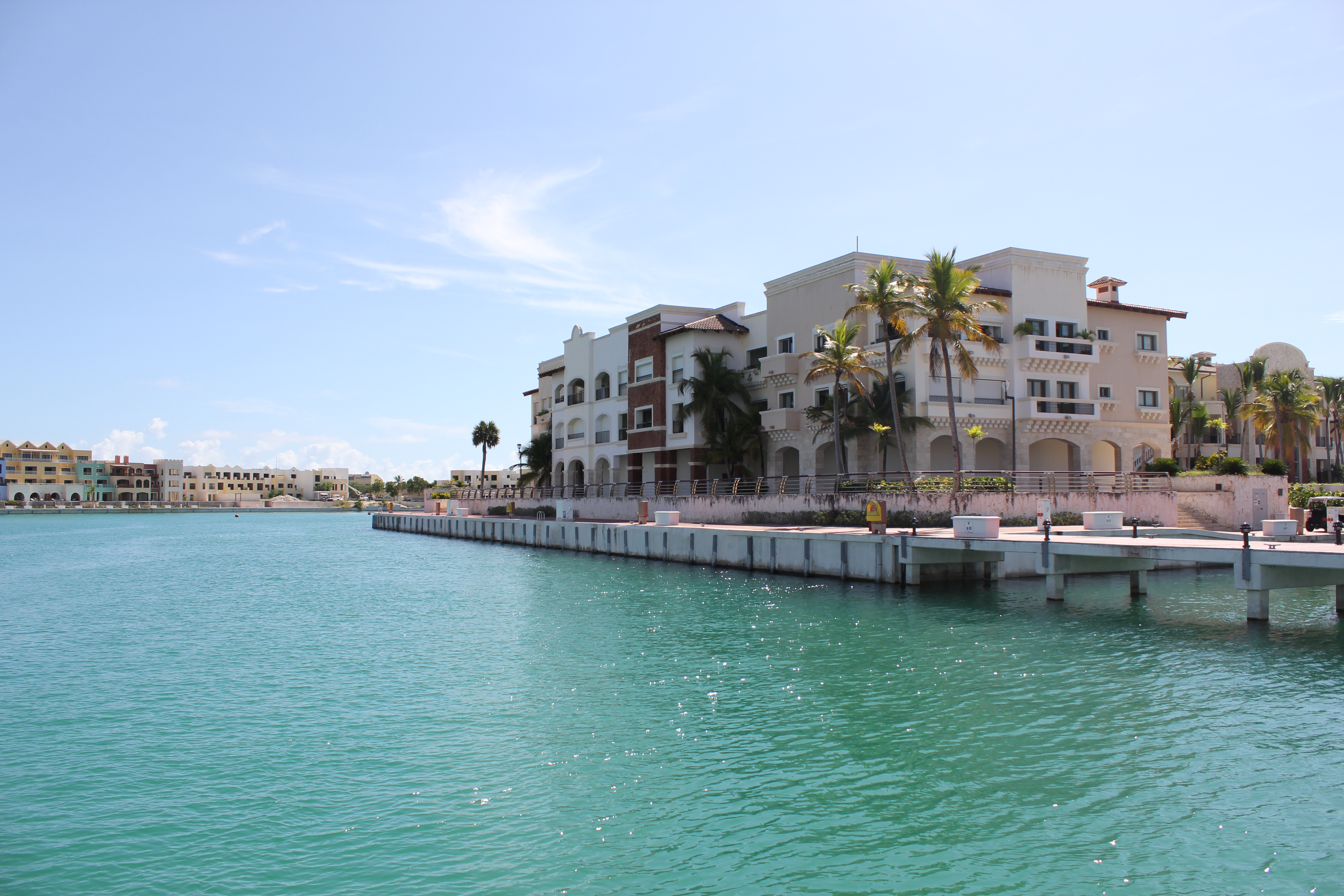
- View of Marina Cap Cana
- Interactive map of Cap Cana
- Country: Dominican Republic
- Province: La Altagracia

Area
  - Total: 123 km^{2} (47 sq mi)

Population (2026)
  - Estimate: 12,000
- Time zone: UTC−4 (AST)
- Website: https://capcana.com/

Cap Cana is a privately developed resort and residential community located in La Altagracia Province, Dominican Republic. Situated on the country's eastern coast, it comprises residential neighborhoods, hotels, beaches, a marina, golf facilities and recreational areas. The development is known as a destination city. Cap Cana covers an area of approximately 123 million square meters (123 km^{2}).

Cap Cana has an estimated population of between 9,000 and 12,000 inhabitants. It operates its own electricity generation and distribution, water supply, and wastewater treatment infrastructure. It also features supermarkets, shops, restaurants, schools, healthcare services, and sports and recreational facilities.

== History ==
The development of Cap Cana began in the early 2000s as a large-scale tourism and real estate project on the southeastern coast of the Dominican Republic. Initial plans called for hotels, private residences, golf courses and a marina, with infrastructure intended to accommodate both visitors and property owners. By 2006, international tourism publications were reporting on construction across an area of approximately 30,000 acres (12,000 hectares). One of the first major recreational facilities was Punta Espada Golf Club, designed by Jack Nicklaus and opened in November 2006. The following year, the first phase of Marina Cap Cana opened, providing berthing facilities for recreational vessels.

The project attracted international investment during its initial expansion. In February 2007, plans were announced for a residential and resort development associated with Donald Trump, including a proposed golf course, villas and private estates. Other hotel and residential projects were announced as construction continued throughout the surrounding property.

The international financial crisis of 2008 affected development activity, and construction at several properties slowed following the collapse of Lehman Brothers. A debt restructuring was completed in 2009, allowing construction work to resume. By that time, the marina was operating alongside residential areas, restaurants and other facilities.

Cap Cana's development included the construction of new hotels, residential properties and recreational facilities, such as Eden Roc Cap Cana, the Los Establos equestrian center and Scape Park. The area surrounding the marina also underwent further development. Punta Espada hosted the Cap Cana Championship, a professional golf tournament on the PGA Tour Champions circuit, from 2008 to 2010.

El Dorado Water Park opened in May 2024, featuring water slides, swimming pools and other attractions. Its official inauguration was held in September of that year, with Dominican president Luis Abinader in attendance. The park joined Cap Cana's existing residential, tourism, sports and entertainment facilities.

== Geography ==
Cap Cana is located on the eastern coast of the Dominican Republic, in La Altagracia Province. The development covers an area of approximately 123 square kilometers (47.5 sq mi). Its territory includes coastal areas, limestone formations and land designated for residential, commercial and tourism development.

Juanillo Beach is among the coastal areas within Cap Cana. The surrounding landscape contains tropical vegetation, caves and freshwater pools formed within limestone formations. These features are particularly visible around Scape Park, where Hoyo Azul, a natural cenote, is located.

== Facilities and attractions ==
Cap Cana contains hotels, residential developments, sports facilities and recreational attractions. Marina Cap Cana provides docking facilities for yachts and other vessels and has hosted sport fishing tournaments. Punta Espada Golf Club, an 18-hole course designed by Jack Nicklaus, is situated along the coastline. The development also includes Los Establos, an equestrian center with facilities for polo and horseback riding.

Several hotels operate within Cap Cana, including Eden Roc Cap Cana, Sanctuary Cap Cana, Hyatt Ziva Cap Cana, Hyatt Zilara Cap Cana and The St. Regis Cap Cana Resort, which opened in 2025. The hotel properties are distributed across coastal and residential areas, including locations near Juanillo Beach and Punta Espada.

Recreational facilities include Scape Park, an adventure park with caves, hiking trails, zip lines and the Hoyo Azul cenote. El Dorado Water Park, which opened in 2024, features water slides, swimming pools and other aquatic attractions.

== See also ==
- Tourism in the Dominican Republic
- La Altagracia Province
- Cap Cana Championship
