= Bobo (J Balvin song) =

Single by J Balvin

from the album Energía
- Released: May 6, 2016
- Genre: Reggaeton
- Length: 3:29
- Label: Universal; Capitol Latin
- Songwriters: José Osorio; Alejandro Ramírez; Rene Cano; Alejandro Patiño
- Producers: Ramírez; Patiño

J Balvin singles chronology
"Love Is the Name" (2016)	"Bobo" (2016)	"Safari" (2016)

"Bobo" is a song performed by Colombian singer J Balvin, released as the second single, by Universal Music Group on May 6, 2016 for his studio album Energía.

== Performance ==
The song reached number one in Mexico, as well as the top 10 in Argentina, Colombia, Dominican Republic, Ecuador, Guatemala and Panama, and the top 20 in Chile and Spain.

== Charts ==
=== Weekly charts ===
Chart (2016)	Peak position
Argentina (Monitor Latino)	8
Chile (Monitor Latino)	11
Colombia (National-Report)	2
Dominican Republic (Monitor Latino)	9
Ecuador (National-Report)	4
Guatemala (Monitor Latino)	5
Mexico (Monitor Latino)	1
Mexico (Billboard Mexican Airplay)	1
Panama (Monitor Latino)	5
Spain (PROMUSICAE)	13
US Bubbling Under Hot 100 (Billboard)	4
US Hot Latin Songs (Billboard)	1
US Latin Airplay (Billboard)	1
US Latin Rhythm Airplay (Billboard)	1
US Tropical Songs (Billboard)	2

=== Year-end charts ===
Chart (2016)	Position
Spain (PROMUSICAE)	32
US Hot Latin Songs (Billboard)	6

== Certifications ==
Region	Certification	Certified units/sales
Brazil (Pro-Música Brasil)	Gold	30,000^{‡}
Mexico (AMPROFON)	4× Platinum+Gold	270,000^{‡}
Spain (PROMUSICAE)	2× Platinum	80,000^{‡}
United States (RIAA)	Platinum (Latin)	60,000^{‡}
^{‡} Sales+streaming figures based on certification alone.

== See also ==
- List of number-one songs of 2016 (Mexico)
- List of Billboard number-one Latin songs of 2016
