= List of Panamanian chart achievements and milestones =

This is a comprehensive listing that highlights significant achievements and milestones based upon Panamanian singles charts. The Panamanian charts began publishing since 1983 through United Press International (until 1996), Notimex (from 1998 to 2005), and EFE (from 2006 to 2010). Currently, the Panamanian charts now are published by Monitor Latino since December 5, 2016, and is currently the standard popular music chart in Panama. This list spans the period from the issue dated July 23, 1983 to present.

== Song milestones ==
=== Most weeks at number one ===
| Number of weeks | Artist(s) | Song | Year(s) | Reference |
|---|---|---|---|---|
| 24 | Luis Fonsi and Daddy Yankee featuring Justin Bieber | "Despacito" | 2017 | |
| 19 | Daddy Yankee | "Dura" | 2018 | |
| 18 | Shakira | "Soltera" | 2024-2025 | |
| 16 | J Balvin and Willy William featuring Beyoncé | "Mi Gente" | 2017-2018 | |
| 14 | Daddy Yankee featuring Snow | "Con Calma" | 2019 | |
| 14 | Karol G and Nicki Minaj | "Tusa" | 2020 | |
| 11 | Joey Montana and Sebastián Yatra | "Suena El Dembow" | 2017 | |
| 11 | Maluma (8 weeks solo, 3 weeks featuring The Weeknd) | "Hawái" | 2020-2021 | |

=== Most weeks at number two (without hitting number one) ===
| Number of weeks | Artist(s) | Song | Year(s) | Kept out of number-one position by | Reference |
|---|---|---|---|---|---|
| 11 | Maluma | "Felices los 4" | 2017 | "Despacito" (Luis Fonsi and Daddy Yankee featuring Justin Bieber), "Mi Gente" (J Balvin and Willy William featuring Beyoncé) | |
| 11 | Daddy Yankee and Sech | "Definitivamente" | 2020 | "Tusa" (Karol G and Nicki Minaj), "No Te Vayas" (Carlos Vives) | |
| 8 | Karol G and Shakira | "TQG" | 2023 | "La Fórmula" (Maluma and Marc Anthony), "Diablo, Qué Chimba" (Maluma and Anuel AA) | |
| 7 | Nicky Jam | "El Amante" | 2017 | "Despacito" (Luis Fonsi and Daddy Yankee featuring Justin Bieber) | |
| 6 | Ed Sheeran | "Shape of You" | 2017 | "Despacito" (Luis Fonsi and Daddy Yankee featuring Justin Bieber) | |

=== Most total weeks on the charts ===
| Number of weeks | Artist(s) | Song | Year | Reference |
|---|---|---|---|---|
| 67 | Luis Fonsi and Daddy Yankee featuring Justin Bieber | "Despacito" | 2018 | |
| 56 | Daddy Yankee featuring Snow | "Con Calma" | 2020 | |
| 56 | Alleh and Yorghaki | "Capaz (Merenguetón)" | 2026 | |
| 54 | Beéle | "No Tiene Sentido" | 2026 | |
| 53 | Boza and Elena Rose | "Orion" | 2026 | |
| 52 | Pedro Capó featuring Farruko | "Calma" | 2020 | |
| 51 | Karol G | "Provenza" | 2023 | |
| 50 | Maluma | "Felices los 4" | 2018 | |
| 49 | Daddy Yankee | "Dura" | 2019 | |
| 49 | Sech featuring Daddy Yankee, J Balvin, Farruko and Rosalía | "Relación" | 2021 | |
| 48 | W Sound, Beéle and Ovy on the Drums | "La Plena (W Sound 05)" | 2026 | |
| 47 | Carlos Vives and Sebastián Yatra | "Robarte un Beso" | 2018 | |
| 47 | Beéle | "Si Te Pillara" | 2026 | |
| 45 | Nacho | "Báilame" | 2018 | |
| 45 | Manuel Turizo | "La Bachata" | 2023 | |
| 43 | Ed Sheeran | "Shape of You" | 2018 | |
| 43 | J Balvin and Willy William featuring Beyoncé | "Mi Gente" | 2018 | |
| 42 | Nicky Jam and J Balvin | "X" | 2019 | |
| 42 | Maluma | "Hawái" | 2021 | |
| 40 | Kenny Man and Sebastián Yatra | "Ni Gucci Ni Prada" | 2019 | |
| 40 | Bad Bunny and Chencho Corleone | "Me Porto Bonito" | 2023 | |

Note: The year displayed is the year the songs ended their respective chart runs.

=== Number-one debuts ===
| Year | Issue date | Song | Artist(s) | Reference |
|---|---|---|---|---|
| 2016 | December 5 | "Safari" | J Balvin featuring Pharrell Williams, Bia and Sky | |
| 2017 | January 16 | "Despacito" | Luis Fonsi and Daddy Yankee featuring Justin Bieber | |
| 2017 | July 3 | "Mi Gente" | J Balvin and Willy William featuring Beyoncé | |
| 2017 | September 4 | "Suena El Dembow" | Joey Montana and Sebastián Yatra | |
| 2018 | July 9 | "No es justo" | J Balvin and Zion & Lennox | |
| 2019 | January 7 | "Viral Pisadinha" | Joey Montana and Felipe Araujo | |
| 2019 | October 7 | "Sin novio" | Real Phantom | |
| 2019 | December 16 | "Ya no más" | Nacho, Yandel and Joey Montana featuring Sebastián Yatra | |
| 2020 | August 17 | "Hawái" | Maluma | |
| 2020 | November 30 | "Cumbiana" | Carlos Vives | |
| 2021 | March 8 | "Agua de Jamaica" | Maluma | |
| 2021 | May 10 | "Chica Super Poderosa" | Martin Machore and Magic Juan | |
| 2021 | July 12 | "Sobrio" | Maluma | |
| 2021 | September 13 | "Besos en Cualquier Horario" | Carlos Vives featuring Mau y Ricky and Lucy Vives | |
| 2021 | October 25 | "Sukutubla" | Lalo Ebratt and Maluma | |
| 2022 | March 7 | "Baloncito Viejo" | Carlos Vives and Camilo | |
| 2022 | May 16 | "Te Espero" | Prince Royce and Maria Becerra | |
| 2022 | June 13 | "Nos Comemos Vivos" | Maluma and Chencho Corleone | |
| 2022 | July 25 | "Inquieta" | Emil | |
| 2023 | January 9 | "Shakira: Bzrp Music Sessions, Vol. 53" | Bizarrap and Shakira | |
| 2023 | February 27 | "La Fórmula" | Maluma and Marc Anthony | |
| 2023 | April 10 | "Diablo, Qué Chimba" | Maluma and Anuel AA | |
| 2023 | May 15 | "Coco Chanel" | Eladio Carrión and Bad Bunny | |
| 2023 | December 18 | "La Original" | Emilia and Tini | |
| 2024 | February 5 | "Le Metí" | Aldo Ranks | |
| 2024 | March 11 | "Los hombres también lloran" | Los Rabanes | |
| 2024 | May 27 | "Tu o Yo" | Silvestre Dangond and Carlos Vives | |
| 2025 | March 31 | "Me toca a mí" | Morat and Camilo | |
| 2025 | May 12 | "Blackout" | Emilia, Nicki Nicole and Tini | |
| 2026 | January 19 | "Cambiaré" | Luis Fonsi and Feid | |

Since its inception in December 2016, at least one song has debuted at number one per year. 2021 and 2023 holds the record for most debuts at number one in a calendar year, with five. In Panama, nine artists in history have more than one song that debuted at number one. Maluma leads with seven songs; Carlos Vives debuted with four songs; J Balvin and Joey Montana debuted with three songs; while Sebastián Yatra, Camilo, Luis Fonsi, Tini and Emilia has debuted with two songs.

=== Longest climbs to number one ===
- 29th week – Sech – "Sal y Perrea" (2021–22)
- 23rd week – Kenny Man and Sebastián Yatra – "Ni Gucci Ni Prada" (2018)
- 16th week – Sech featuring Darell – "Otro Trago" (2019)
- 14th week – Nicky Jam and J Balvin – "X" (2018)
- 12th week – Becky G and Bad Bunny – "Mayores" (2017–18), Myke Towers – "Diosa" (2020)
- 10th week – Karol G and Nicki Minaj – "Tusa" (2019–20)

== Artist achievements ==
=== Most number-one singles ===
| Number of singles | Artist |
|---|---|
| 15 | Maluma |
| 10 | Carlos Vives |
| 9 | J Balvin |
| 9 | Luis Miguel |
| 9 | Shakira |
| 7 | Madonna |
| 7 | Karol G |
| 7 | Myke Towers |
| 6 | Daddy Yankee |
| 6 | Sebastián Yatra |
| 5 | Cristian Castro |
| 5 | Joey Montana |
| 5 | Morat |
| 5 | Ricky Martin |

=== Most cumulative weeks at number one ===
| Weeks at number one | Artist |
|---|---|
| 67 | Daddy Yankee |
| 62 | Maluma |
| 39 | Carlos Vives |
| 39 | Shakira |
| 37 | J Balvin |
| 34 | Karol G |
| 32 | Luis Fonsi |
| 28 | Sebastián Yatra |
| 24 | Justin Bieber |
| 23 | Joey Montana |
| 22 | Myke Towers |

=== Most consecutive years charting a number-one single ===
| Number of years | Artist | First number-one hit and week | Final number-one hit and final week | Highest-peaking song during streak-breaking year |
|---|---|---|---|---|
| 7 | Maluma | "Vente Pa' Ca" (January 9, 2017) | "Coco Loco" (July 24, 2023) | "Según Quien" (No. 13 – January 1, 2024) |
| 4 | J Balvin | "Safari" (December 5, 2016) | "Qué pena" (November 18, 2019) | "Rojo" (No. 2 – April 6, 2020) |
| 3 | Daddy Yankee | "Despacito" (January 16, 2017) | "Que Tire Pa Lante" (December 9, 2019) | "Muévelo" (No. 2 – January 20, 2020) |
| 2 | Luis Fonsi | "Despacito" (January 16, 2017) | "Échame la Culpa" (January 22, 2018) | "Date la Vuelta" (No. 5 – May 20, 2019) |
| 2 | Zion & Lennox | "Otra Vez" (January 2, 2017) | "No es justo" (August 27, 2018) | "Solita" (No. 4 – March 25, 2019) |

=== Most number-one singles in a calendar year ===
| Number of singles | Artist | Year charted | Singles |
|---|---|---|---|
| 4 | Madonna | 1985 | "Like a Virgin" |
| 4 | Madonna | 1985 | "Material Girl" |
| 4 | Madonna | 1985 | "Crazy for You" |
| 4 | Madonna | 1985 | "Angel" |
| 4 | J Balvin | 2018 | "Mi Gente" (with Willy William featuring Beyoncé) |
| 4 | J Balvin | 2018 | "X" (with Nicky Jam) |
| 4 | J Balvin | 2018 | "No es justo" (with Zion & Lennox) |
| 4 | J Balvin | 2018 | "Mocca" (Lalo Ebratt featuring J Balvin and Trapical) |
| 4 | Maluma | 2021 | "Hawái" (featuring The Weeknd) |
| 4 | Maluma | 2021 | "Agua de Jamaica" |
| 4 | Maluma | 2021 | "Sobrio" |
| 4 | Maluma | 2021 | "Sukutubla" (with Lalo Ebratt) |
| 3 | Daddy Yankee | 2019 | "Con Calma" (featuring Snow) |
| 3 | Daddy Yankee | 2019 | "Runaway" (with Sebastián Yatra and Natti Natasha featuring Jonas Brothers) |
| 3 | Daddy Yankee | 2019 | "Que Tire Pa Lante" |
| 3 | Sebastián Yatra | 2019 | "Runaway" (with Daddy Yankee and Natti Natasha featuring Jonas Brothers) |
| 3 | Sebastián Yatra | 2019 | "Bonita" (with Juanes) |
| 3 | Sebastián Yatra | 2019 | "Ya no más" (Nacho, Yandel and Joey Montana featuring Sebastián Yatra) |
| 3 | Carlos Vives | 2020 | "No te vayas" |
| 3 | Carlos Vives | 2020 | "For Sale" (with Alejandro Sanz) |
| 3 | Carlos Vives | 2020 | "Cumbiana" |
| 3 | Karol G | 2025 | "Latina Foreva" |
| 3 | Karol G | 2025 | "Verano Rosa" (with Feid) |
| 3 | Karol G | 2025 | "Coleccionando Heridas" (with Marco Antonio Solís) |

=== Most number-one debuts ===
| Number | Artist | Songs |
|---|---|---|
| 7 | Maluma | "Hawái" |
| 7 | Maluma | "Agua de Jamaica" |
| 7 | Maluma | "Sobrio" |
| 7 | Maluma | "Sukutubla" (with Lalo Ebratt) |
| 7 | Maluma | "Nos Comemos Vivos" (with Chencho Corleone) |
| 7 | Maluma | "La Fórmula" (with Marc Anthony) |
| 7 | Maluma | "Diablo, Qué Chimba" (with Anuel AA) |
| 4 | Carlos Vives | "Cumbiana" |
| 4 | Carlos Vives | "Besos en Cualquier Horario" (featuring Mau y Ricky and Lucy Vives) |
| 4 | Carlos Vives | "Baloncito Viejo" (with Camilo) |
| 4 | Carlos Vives | "Tu o Yo" (with Silvestre Dangond) |
| 3 | J Balvin | "Safari" (featuring Pharrell Williams, Bia and Sky) |
| 3 | J Balvin | "Mi Gente" (with Willy William featuring Beyoncé) |
| 3 | J Balvin | "No es justo" (with Zion & Lennox) |
| 3 | Joey Montana | "Suena El Dembow" (with Sebastián Yatra) |
| 3 | Joey Montana | "Viral Pisadinha" (with Felipe Araujo) |
| 3 | Joey Montana | "Ya no más" (with Nacho and Yandel featuring Sebastián Yatra) |

=== Simultaneously occupying the top two positions ===
- J Balvin:

- December 5–26, 2016
1. "Safari" (featuring Pharrell Williams, Bia and Sky)
2. "Otra Vez" (Zion & Lennox featuring J Balvin)
- July 9, 2018
1. "No es justo" (with Zion & Lennox)
2. "X" (with Nicky Jam)

- Karol G:

- May 9, 2022
1. "Provenza"
2. "Mamiii" (with Becky G)
- August 25, 2025
1. "Coleccionando Heridas" (with Marco Antonio Solís)
2. "Verano Rosa" (with Feid)

- Bad Bunny:

- February 24, 2025
1. "Nuevayol"
2. "DTMF"

=== Self-replacement at number one ===
- Karol G – "Mamiii" (with Becky G) → "Provenza" (May 9, 2022)
- Bizarrap – "Quevedo: Bzrp Music Sessions, Vol. 52" (with Quevedo) → "Shakira: Bzrp Music Sessions, Vol. 53" (with Shakira) (January 9, 2023)
- Maluma – "La Fórmula" (with Marc Anthony) → "Diablo, Qué Chimba" (with Anuel AA) (April 10, 2023)
- Bad Bunny – "DTMF" → "Nuevayol" (February 24, 2025)
- Karol G – "Verano Rosa" (with Feid) → "Coleccionando Heridas" (with Marco Antonio Solís) (August 25, 2025)
- Karol G – "Coleccionando Heridas" (with Marco Antonio Solís) → "Verano Rosa" (with Feid) (September 1, 2025)
