= List of Top 100 songs for 2016 in Mexico =

This is a list of the General Top 100 songs of 2016 in Mexico according to Monitor Latino. Monitor Latino also issued separate year-end charts for Regional Mexican, Pop and Anglo songs.

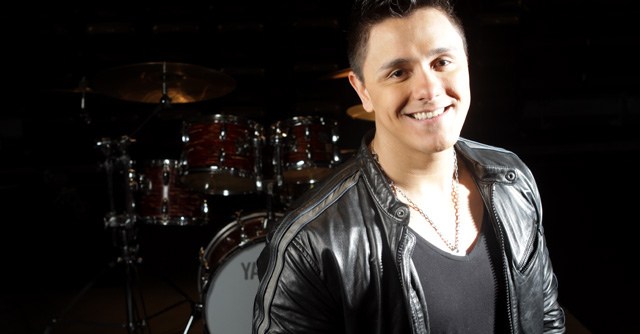
Panamanian singer-songwriter Joey Montana (pictured) earned his first No. 1 song in Mexico with "Picky" for 4 weeks, which was also the most successful song of the year in the country.

No.	Title	Artist(s)
1	Picky	Joey Montana
2	Te Dirán	La Adictiva Banda San José de Mesillas
3	Tengo Que Colgar	Banda Sinaloense MS de Sergio Lizárraga
4	Duele el Corazón	Enrique Iglesias featuring Wisin
5	Prestamela A Mí	Calibre 50
6	Me Esta Gustando	Banda Los Recoditos
7	Bobo	J Balvin
8	Espero Con Ansias	Remmy Valenzuela
9	This Is What You Came For	Calvin Harris featuring Rihanna
10	Solo Con Verte	Banda Sinaloense MS de Sergio Lizárraga
11	Ataúd	Los Tigres del Norte
12	La Bicicleta	Carlos Vives & Shakira
13	Mujer Mujer	Banda El Recodo
14	Middle	DJ Snake featuring Bipolar Sunshine
15	Can't Stop the Feeling!	Justin Timberlake
16	Amor Del Bueno	Calibre 50
17	Me Va A Pesar	La Arrolladora Banda El Limon
18	Stressed Out	Twenty One Pilots
19	Safari	J Balvin featuring Pharrell Williams, BIA and Sky
20	Cheap Thrills	Sia
21	Deja Que Te Bese	Alejandro Sanz featuring Marc Anthony
22	Cake by the Ocean	DNCE
23	No Soy Una De Esas	Jesse & Joy featuring Alejandro Sanz
24	Tragos De Alcohol	Alfredo Rios "El Komander"
25	One Dance	Drake featuring Wizkid and Kyla
26	Love Yourself	Justin Bieber
27	This Girl	Kungs vs. Cookin' on 3 Burners
28	Que Caro Estoy Pagando	La Adictiva Banda San José de Mesillas
29	Desde Cuando No Me Quieres	Banda Carnaval
30	Sorry	Justin Bieber featuring J Balvin
31	No Es Culpa Tuya	Chuy Lizárraga
32	Shaky Shaky	Daddy Yankee
33	El Cuento Perfecto	Banda Los Sebastianes
34	A Veces	Espinoza Paz
35	I Took a Pill in Ibiza	Mike Posner
36	Todo O Nada	Alfredo Olivas
37	El Perdedor	Maluma
38	Al Rescate	Banda Los Recoditos
39	Reality	Lost Frequencies featuring Janieck Devy
40	El Borrachito	Julión Álvarez y su Norteño Banda
41	Don't Let Me Down	The Chainsmokers featuring Daya
42	Me Vas A Extrañar	Banda Sinaloense MS de Sergio Lizárraga
43	En Esta No	Sin Bandera
44	Work	Rihanna featuring Drake
45	Se Me Olvido Quererte	Banda Los Sebastianes
46	Adventure of a Lifetime	Coldplay
47	Amor Amor Amor	Paty Cantú
48	Faded	Alan Walker
49	Desde Esa Noche	Thalía featuring Maluma
50	Dimelo Al Revés	Gloria Trevi
51	Quiero Que Vuelvas	Alejandro Fernández
52	Ya Me Enteré	Reik
53	Si No Es Contigo	Banda El Recodo
54	Locos	León Larregui
55	Let Me Love You	Dj Snake featuring Justin Bieber
56	Supiste Hacerme Mal	Banda La Trakalosa
57	We Don't Talk Anymore	Charlie Puth featuring Selena Gomez
58	Ride	Twenty One Pilots
59	Mente Degenerada	El Bebeto
60	Que Chulada De Papucho	Los Horóscopos de Durango
61	Dueles	Jesse & Joy
62	Consejo De Amigos	Cristian Jacobo
63	Por Fin Te Encontré	Cali & El Dandee featuring Juan Magan and Sebastián Yatra
64	De Que Se Puede Se Puede	Los Inquietos del Norte
65	Casate Conmigo	Belanova
66	Pistearé	Banda Los Recoditos
67	Closer	The Chainsmokers featuring Halsey
68	En Que Cabeza Cabe	Banda Carnaval
69	Yo Si Te Amé	La Arrolladora Banda El Limón
70	Cuando Llegaste	Pee Wee
71	Cold Water	Major Lazer featuring Justin Bieber and MØ
72	Traicionera	Sebastián Yatra
73	Pillowtalk	Zayn
74	Tu Ausencia	Intocable
75	Locked Away	R. City featuring Adam Levine
76	Dime Como	La Bandononona Clave Nueva
77	Hello	Adele
78	Caminar De Tu Mano	Río Roma featuring Fonseca
79	Inevitable	Banda El Recodo
80	Sin Contrato	Maluma
81	The Girl Is Mine	99 Souls featuring Destiny's Child and Brandy
82	Por Enamorarme	Los Plebes Del Rancho
83	Vente Pa' Ca	Ricky Martin featuring Maluma
84	Tu Cárcel	Los Tigres del Norte featuring Marco Antonio Solís
85	Eres La Persona Correcta En El Momento Equivocado	Río Roma
86	Tu Falta De Querer	Mon Laferte
87	Perfect Strangers	Jonas Blue featuring JP Cooper
88	En Toda La Chapa	Edwin Luna y La Trakalosa featuring El Palomo y El Gorrión
89	Convidela	La Iniciativa featuring Banda Los Recoditos
90	Rompimos Las Reglas	Impacto Sinaloense
91	Light It Up	Major Lazer featuring Fuse ODG & Nyla
92	Los Gustos Que Tiene El Muchacho	Toño Lizarraga
93	Millones De Besos	Gerardo Ortiz
94	Rumbo A Maza	Los Titanes De Durango
95	Amor De Los Pobres	La Original Banda El Limón
96	Sin Pelos En La Lengua	Fidel Rueda
97	Fast Car	Jonas Blue featuring Dakota
98	Treat You Better	Shawn Mendes
99	I Feel Alive	CD9
100	Bang My Head	David Guetta featuring Fetty Wap & Sia

== See also ==
- List of number-one songs of 2016 (Mexico)
- List of number-one albums of 2016 (Mexico)
