= List of number-one songs of 2016 (Mexico) =

This is a list of the number-one songs of 2016 in Mexico. The airplay chart rankings are published by Monitor Latino, based on airplay across radio stations in Mexico using the Radio Tracking Data, LLC in real time. Charts are ranked from Monday to Sunday.

The streaming charts are published weekly by AMPROFON (Asociación Mexicana de Productores de Fonogramas y Videogramas).

== Chart history (airplay) ==
In 2016, nineteen songs reached number one on the General chart, the biggest amount since the chart started in 2007. Of these, fourteen songs were entirely or mostly in Spanish, and the remaining five were entirely in English (also the biggest amount since the chart was founded). Thirteen acts achieved their first number-one song in Mexico: Coldplay, Maluma, Twenty One Pilots, Joey Montana, Wisin, Justin Timberlake, Daddy Yankee, DJ Snake, Justin Bieber, Pharrell Williams, Bia, Sky and Los Plebes del Rancho.

"Safari" by J Balvin was the longest-running number-one of the year, staying at the top position for seven weeks. The best-performing song of the year was Joey Montana's "Picky".

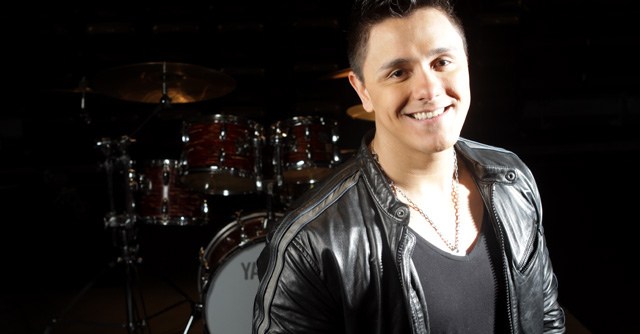
Panamanian singer-songwriter Joey Montana (pictured) earned his first No. 1 song in Mexico with "Picky", which was also the most successful song of the year in the country.

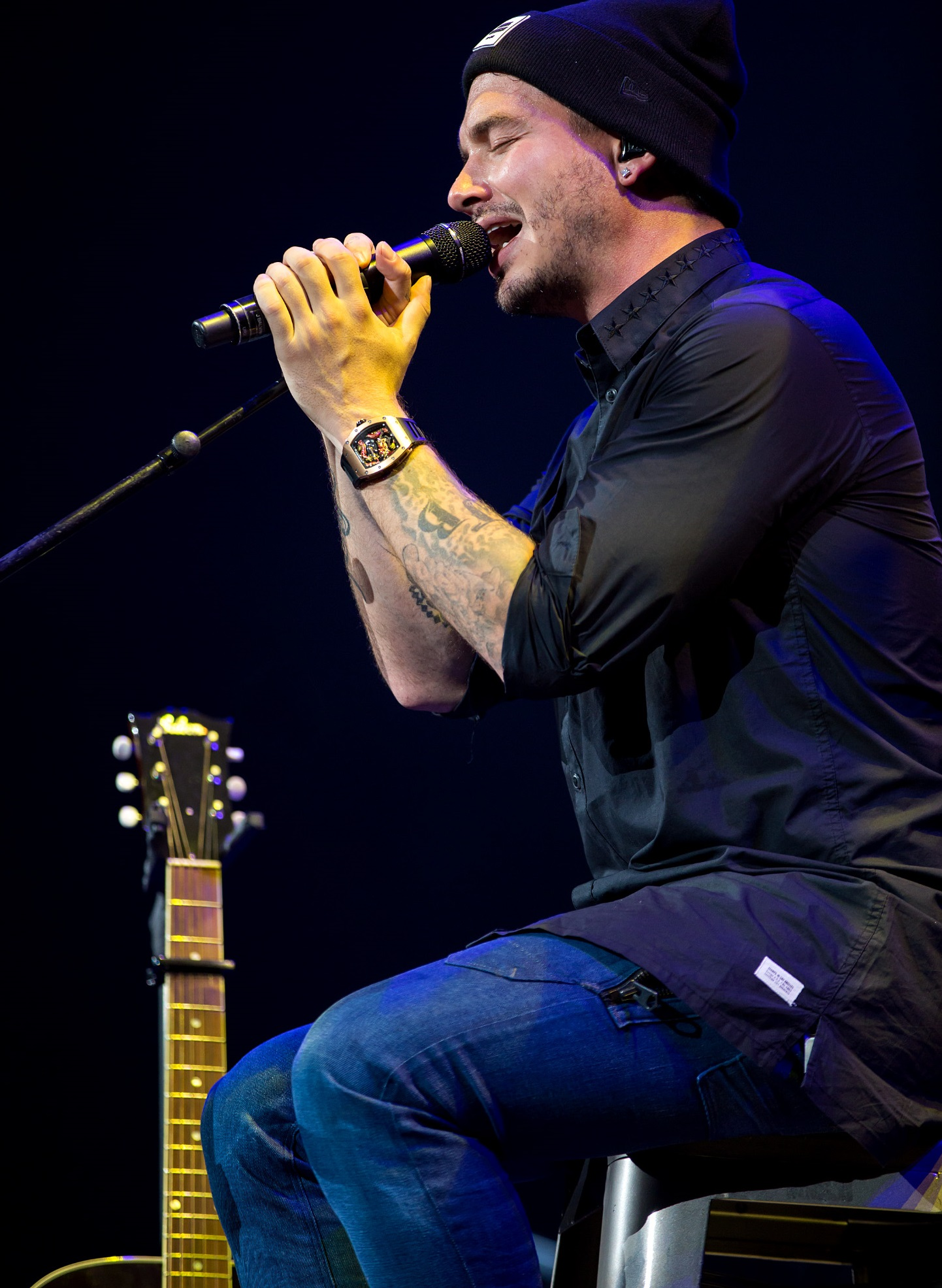
Colombian singer J Balvin (pictured) spent 11 weeks at the top of the Mexican charts with the songs "Bobo" and "Safari".

Besides the General chart, Monitor Latino also publishes "Pop", "Popular" (Regional Mexican) and "Anglo" charts.

=== General ===
The yellow background indicates the best-performing song of 2016.

Issue date	Song (Audience)	Song (Spins)	Ref.
January 3	"Sólo con verte"^{Banda MS}	"Pistearé"^{Banda Los Recoditos}	
January 10	"Sólo con verte"^{Banda MS}	"Pistearé"^{Banda Los Recoditos}	
January 17	"Hello"^{Adele}	"Pistearé"^{Banda Los Recoditos}	
January 24	"Ya te perdí la fe"^{La Arrolladora Banda El Limón}	"Pistearé"^{Banda Los Recoditos}	
January 31	"Ya te perdí la fe"^{La Arrolladora Banda El Limón}	"Sólo con verte"^{Banda MS}	
February 7	"Préstamela a mí"^{Calibre 50}	"Sólo con verte"^{Banda MS}	
February 14	"Adventure of a Lifetime"^{Coldplay}	"Sólo con verte"^{Banda MS}	
February 21	"Adventure of a Lifetime"^{Coldplay}	"Préstamela a mi"^{Calibre 50}	
February 28	"Préstamela a mí"^{Calibre 50}	"Préstamela a mi"^{Calibre 50}	
March 6	"Sólo con verte"^{Banda MS}	"Préstamela a mi"^{Calibre 50}	
March 13	"Sólo con verte"^{Banda MS}	"Espero con ansias"^{Remmy Valenzuela}	
March 20	"El perdedor"^{Maluma}	"Espero con ansias"^{Remmy Valenzuela}	
March 27	"El perdedor"^{Maluma}	"Espero con ansias"^{Remmy Valenzuela}	
April 3	"Stressed Out"^{Twenty One Pilots}	"Espero con ansias"^{Remmy Valenzuela}	
April 10	"El perdedor"^{Maluma}	"Espero con ansias"^{Remmy Valenzuela}	
April 17	"El perdedor"^{Maluma}	"Te dirán"^{La Adictiva}	
April 24	"El perdedor"^{Maluma}	"Te dirán"^{La Adictiva}	
1 May	"Picky"^{Joey Montana}	"Picky"^{Joey Montana}	
8 May	"Picky"^{Joey Montana}	"Picky"^{Joey Montana}	
15 May	"Picky"^{Joey Montana}	"Picky"^{Joey Montana}	
22 May	"Picky"^{Joey Montana}	"Picky"^{Joey Montana}	
29 May	"Duele el Corazón"^{Enrique Iglesias featuring Wisin}	"Picky"^{Joey Montana}	
June 5	"Bobo"^{J Balvin}	"Bobo"^{J Balvin}	
June 12	"Bobo"^{J Balvin}	"Bobo"^{J Balvin}	
June 19	"Bobo"^{J Balvin}	"Bobo"^{J Balvin}	
June 26	"Bobo"^{J Balvin}	"Bobo"^{J Balvin}	
July 3	"Can't Stop the Feeling!"^{Justin Timberlake}	"Bobo"^{J Balvin}	
July 10	"Can't Stop the Feeling!"^{Justin Timberlake}	"Bobo"^{J Balvin}	
July 17	"Can't Stop the Feeling!"^{Justin Timberlake}	"Bobo"^{J Balvin}	
July 24	"Can't Stop the Feeling!"^{Justin Timberlake}	"Bobo"^{J Balvin}	
July 31	"La Bicicleta"^{Carlos Vives & Shakira}	"Bobo"^{J Balvin}	
August 7	"La Bicicleta"^{Carlos Vives & Shakira}	"Bobo"^{J Balvin}	
August 14	"La Bicicleta"^{Carlos Vives & Shakira}	"Quiéreme (Ámame)"^{Intocable}	
August 21	"La Bicicleta"^{Carlos Vives & Shakira}	"Quiéreme (Ámame)"^{Intocable}	
August 28	"La Bicicleta"^{Carlos Vives & Shakira}	"Amor del bueno"^{Calibre 50}	
September 4	"La Bicicleta"^{Carlos Vives & Shakira}	"Deja que te bese"^{Alejandro Sanz ft. Marc Anthony}	
September 11	"Tengo que colgar"^{Banda MS}	"Deja que te bese"^{Alejandro Sanz ft. Marc Anthony}	
September 18	"Tengo que colgar"^{Banda MS}	"Deja que te bese"^{Alejandro Sanz ft. Marc Anthony}	
September 25	"Amor del bueno"^{Calibre 50}	"Amor del bueno"^{Calibre 50}	
October 2	"Shaky Shaky"^{Daddy Yankee}	"Shaky Shaky"^{Daddy Yankee}	
October 9	"Shaky Shaky"^{Daddy Yankee}	"Shaky Shaky"^{Daddy Yankee}	
October 16	"Let Me Love You"^{DJ Snake ft. Justin Bieber}	"Shaky Shaky"^{Daddy Yankee}	
October 23	"Safari"^{J Balvin ft. Pharrell Williams, Bia & Sky}	"Safari"^{J Balvin ft. Pharrell Williams, Bia & Sky}	
October 30	"Safari"^{J Balvin ft. Pharrell Williams, Bia & Sky}	"Safari"^{J Balvin ft. Pharrell Williams, Bia & Sky}	
November 6	"Safari"^{J Balvin ft. Pharrell Williams, Bia & Sky}	"Safari"^{J Balvin ft. Pharrell Williams, Bia & Sky}	
November 13	"Safari"^{J Balvin ft. Pharrell Williams, Bia & Sky}	"Safari"^{J Balvin ft. Pharrell Williams, Bia & Sky}	
November 20	"Safari"^{J Balvin ft. Pharrell Williams, Bia & Sky}	"Quiero que vuelvas"^{Alejandro Fernández}	
November 27	"Safari"^{J Balvin ft. Pharrell Williams, Bia & Sky}	"Quiero que vuelvas"^{Alejandro Fernández}	
December 4	"Safari"^{J Balvin ft. Pharrell Williams, Bia & Sky}	"Quiero que vuelvas"^{Alejandro Fernández}	
December 11	"Fuego"^{Juanes}	"Quiero que vuelvas"^{Alejandro Fernández}	
December 18	"Fuego"^{Juanes}	"Quiero que vuelvas"^{Alejandro Fernández}	
December 25	"Por enamorarme"^{Los Plebes del Rancho}	"Quiero que vuelvas"^{Alejandro Fernández}	

=== Pop ===
Issue date	Song (Audience)	Song (Spins)	Ref.
January 3	"No soy una de esas"^{Jesse y Joy ft. Alejandro Sanz}	"Las pequeñas cosas"^{Gloria Trevi}	
January 10	"No soy una de esas"^{Jesse y Joy ft. Alejandro Sanz}	"Las pequeñas cosas"^{Gloria Trevi}	
January 17	"No soy una de esas"^{Jesse y Joy ft. Alejandro Sanz}	"En esta no"^{Sin Bandera}	
January 24	"En esta no"^{Sin Bandera}	"En esta no"^{Sin Bandera}	
January 31	"No soy una de esas"^{Jesse y Joy ft. Alejandro Sanz}	"En esta no"^{Sin Bandera}	
February 7	"No soy una de esas"^{Jesse y Joy ft. Alejandro Sanz}	"En esta no"^{Sin Bandera}	
February 14	"No soy una de esas"^{Jesse y Joy ft. Alejandro Sanz}	"No soy una de esas"^{Jesse y Joy ft. Alejandro Sanz}	
February 21	"No soy una de esas"^{Jesse y Joy ft. Alejandro Sanz}	"En esta no"^{Sin Bandera}	
February 28	"No soy una de esas"^{Jesse y Joy ft. Alejandro Sanz}	"En esta no"^{Sin Bandera}	
March 6	"No soy una de esas"^{Jesse y Joy ft. Alejandro Sanz}	"En esta no"^{Sin Bandera}	
March 13	"No soy una de esas"^{Jesse y Joy ft. Alejandro Sanz}	"En esta no"^{Sin Bandera}	
March 20	"No soy una de esas"^{Jesse y Joy ft. Alejandro Sanz}	"No soy una de esas"^{Jesse y Joy ft. Alejandro Sanz}	
March 27	"No soy una de esas"^{Jesse y Joy ft. Alejandro Sanz}	"Amor, amor, amor"^{Paty Cantú}	
April 3	"No soy una de esas"^{Jesse y Joy ft. Alejandro Sanz}	"Amor, amor, amor"^{Paty Cantú}	
April 10	"No soy una de esas"^{Jesse y Joy ft. Alejandro Sanz}	"Cásate conmigo"^{Belanova}	
April 17	"Picky"^{Joey Montana}	"Cásate conmigo"^{Belanova}	
April 24	"Duele el Corazón"^{Enrique Iglesias ft. Wisin}	"Picky"^{Joey Montana}	
1 May	"Duele el Corazón"^{Enrique Iglesias ft. Wisin}	"Picky"^{Joey Montana}	
8 May	"Duele el Corazón"^{Enrique Iglesias ft. Wisin}	"Picky"^{Joey Montana}	
15 May	"Picky"^{Joey Montana}	"Picky"^{Joey Montana}	
22 May	"Duele el corazón"^{Enrique Iglesias ft. Wisin}	"Picky"^{Joey Montana}	
29 May	"Duele el corazón"^{Enrique Iglesias ft. Wisin}	"Duele el corazón"^{Enrique Iglesias ft. Wisin}	
June 5	"Duele el corazón"^{Enrique Iglesias ft. Wisin}	"Bobo"^{J Balvin}	
June 12	"Duele el corazón"^{Enrique Iglesias ft. Wisin}	"Bobo"^{J Balvin}	
June 19	"Duele el corazón"^{Enrique Iglesias ft. Wisin}	"Bobo"^{J Balvin}	
June 26	"Duele el corazón"^{Enrique Iglesias ft. Wisin}	"Bobo"^{J Balvin}	
July 3	"Duele el corazón"^{Enrique Iglesias ft. Wisin}	"Bobo"^{J Balvin}	
July 10	"Duele el corazón"^{Enrique Iglesias ft. Wisin}	"Bobo"^{J Balvin}	
July 17	"Duele el corazón"^{Enrique Iglesias ft. Wisin}	"Bobo"^{J Balvin}	
July 24	"Ya me enteré"^{Reik}	"Bobo"^{J Balvin}	
July 31	"La Bicicleta"^{Carlos Vives & Shakira}	"Bobo"^{J Balvin}	
August 7	"La Bicicleta"^{Carlos Vives & Shakira}	"Deja que te bese"^{Alejandro Sanz ft. Marc Anthony}	
August 14	"La Bicicleta"^{Carlos Vives & Shakira}	"Deja que te bese"^{Alejandro Sanz ft. Marc Anthony}	
August 21	"La Bicicleta"^{Carlos Vives & Shakira}	"Deja que te bese"^{Alejandro Sanz ft. Marc Anthony}	
August 28	"La Bicicleta"^{Carlos Vives & Shakira}	"La bicicleta"^{Carlos Vives & Shakira}	
September 4	"La Bicicleta"^{Carlos Vives & Shakira}	"Deja que te bese"^{Alejandro Sanz ft. Marc Anthony}	
September 11	"La Bicicleta"^{Carlos Vives & Shakira}	"Deja que te bese"^{Alejandro Sanz ft. Marc Anthony}	
September 18	"La Bicicleta"^{Carlos Vives & Shakira}	"Deja que te bese"^{Alejandro Sanz ft. Marc Anthony}	
September 25	"Sobre mí"^{Sin Bandera ft. Maluma}	"Deja que te bese"^{Alejandro Sanz ft. Marc Anthony}	
October 2	"Sobre mí"^{Sin Bandera ft. Maluma}	"Deja que te bese"^{Alejandro Sanz ft. Marc Anthony}	
October 9	"Vente Pa' Ca"^{Ricky Martin ft. Maluma}	"Deja que te bese"^{Alejandro Sanz ft. Marc Anthony}	
October 16	"Deja que te bese"^{Alejandro Sanz ft. Marc Anthony}	"Safari"^{J Balvin ft. Pharrell Williams, Bia & Sky}	
October 23	"Vente pa' ca"^{Ricky Martin ft. Maluma}	"Safari"^{J Balvin ft. Pharrell Williams, Bia & Sky}	
October 30	"Vente pa' ca"^{Ricky Martin ft. Maluma}	"Safari"^{J Balvin ft. Pharrell Williams, Bia & Sky}	
November 6	"Vente pa' ca"^{Ricky Martin ft. Maluma}	"Safari"^{J Balvin ft. Pharrell Williams, Bia & Sky}	
November 13	"Vente pa' ca"^{Ricky Martin ft. Maluma}	"Safari"^{J Balvin ft. Pharrell Williams, Bia & Sky}	
November 20	"Vente pa' ca"^{Ricky Martin ft. Maluma}	"Safari"^{J Balvin ft. Pharrell Williams, Bia & Sky}	
November 27	"Vente pa' ca"^{Ricky Martin ft. Maluma}	"Safari"^{J Balvin ft. Pharrell Williams, Bia & Sky}	
December 4	"Vente pa' ca"^{Ricky Martin ft. Maluma}	"Safari"^{J Balvin ft. Pharrell Williams, Bia & Sky}	
December 11	"Vente pa' ca"^{Ricky Martin ft. Maluma}	"Safari"^{J Balvin ft. Pharrell Williams, Bia & Sky}	
December 18	"Vente pa' ca"^{Ricky Martin ft. Maluma}	"Chantaje"^{Shakira ft. Maluma}	
December 25	"Vente pa' ca"^{Ricky Martin ft. Maluma}	"Fuego"^{Juanes}	

=== Popular ===
Issue date	Song (Audience)	Song (Spins)	Ref.
January 3	"Sólo con verte"^{Banda MS}	"Pistearé"^{Banda Los Recoditos}	
January 10	"Sólo con verte"^{Banda MS}	"Pistearé"^{Banda Los Recoditos}	
January 17	"Sólo con verte"^{Banda MS}	"Pistearé"^{Banda Los Recoditos}	
January 24	"Ya te perdí la fe"^{La Arrolladora Banda El Limón}	"Pistearé"^{Banda Los Recoditos}	
January 31	"Ya te perdí la fe"^{La Arrolladora Banda El Limón}	"Sólo con verte"^{Banda MS}	
February 7	"Préstamela a mi"^{Calibre 50}	"Sólo con verte"^{Banda MS}	
February 14	"Sólo con verte"^{Banda MS}	"Sólo con verte"^{Banda MS}	
February 21	"Préstamela a mi"^{Calibre 50}	"Préstamela a mi"^{Calibre 50}	
February 28	"Préstamela a mi"^{Calibre 50}	"Préstamela a mi"^{Calibre 50}	
March 6	"Sólo con verte"^{Banda MS}	"Préstamela a mi"^{Calibre 50}	
March 13	"Sólo con verte"^{Banda MS}	"Espero con ansias"^{Remmy Valenzuela}	
March 20	"Espero con ansias"^{Remmy Valenzuela}	"Espero con ansias"^{Remmy Valenzuela}	
March 27	"Todo o nada"^{Alfredo Olivas}	"Espero con ansias"^{Remmy Valenzuela}	
April 3	"Todo o nada"^{Alfredo Olivas}	"Espero con ansias"^{Remmy Valenzuela}	
April 10	"Todo o nada"^{Alfredo Olivas}	"Espero con ansias"^{Remmy Valenzuela}	
April 17	"Todo o nada"^{Alfredo Olivas}	"Te dirán"^{La Adictiva Banda San José de Mesillas}	
April 24	"Te dirán"^{La Adictiva Banda San José de Mesillas}	"Te dirán"^{La Adictiva Banda San José de Mesillas}	
1 May	"Te dirán"^{La Adictiva Banda San José de Mesillas}	"Te dirán"^{La Adictiva Banda San José de Mesillas}	
8 May	"Te dirán"^{La Adictiva Banda San José de Mesillas}	"Te dirán"^{La Adictiva Banda San José de Mesillas}	
15 May	"Te dirán"^{La Adictiva Banda San José de Mesillas}	"Te dirán"^{La Adictiva Banda San José de Mesillas}	
22 May	"Te dirán"^{La Adictiva Banda San José de Mesillas}	"Te dirán"^{La Adictiva Banda San José de Mesillas}	
29 May	"Me va a pesar"^{La Arrolladora Banda El Limón}	"Te dirán"^{La Adictiva Banda San José de Mesillas}	
June 5	"Ataúd"^{Los Tigres del Norte}	"Ataúd"^{Los Tigres del Norte}	
June 12	"Me va a pesar"^{La Arrolladora Banda El Limón}	"Ataúd"^{Los Tigres del Norte}	
June 19	"Me va a pesar"^{La Arrolladora Banda El Limón}	"Ataúd"^{Los Tigres del Norte}	
June 26	"Me va a pesar"^{La Arrolladora Banda El Limón}	"Ataúd"^{Los Tigres del Norte}	
July 3	"Me va a pesar"^{La Arrolladora Banda El Limón}	"Ataúd"^{Los Tigres del Norte}	
July 10	"Me va a pesar"^{La Arrolladora Banda El Limón}	"Ataúd"^{Los Tigres del Norte}	
July 17	"Me va a pesar"^{La Arrolladora Banda El Limón}	"Ataúd"^{Los Tigres del Norte}	
July 24	"El cuento perfecto"^{Banda Los Sebastianes}	"El cuento perfecto"^{Banda Los Sebastianes}	
July 31	"Me va a pesar"^{La Arrolladora Banda El Limón}	"El cuento perfecto"^{Banda Los Sebastianes}	
August 7	"Me va a pesar"^{La Arrolladora Banda El Limón}	"El cuento perfecto"^{Banda Los Sebastianes}	
August 14	"Me va a pesar"^{La Arrolladora Banda El Limón}	"Quiéreme (Ámame)"^{Intocable}	
August 21	"Tengo que colgar"^{Banda MS}	"Quiéreme (Ámame)"^{Intocable}	
August 28	"Amor del bueno"^{Calibre 50}	"Amor del bueno"^{Calibre 50}	
September 4	"Tengo que colgar"^{Banda MS}	"Amor del bueno"^{Calibre 50}	
September 11	"Tengo que colgar"^{Banda MS}	"Amor del bueno"^{Calibre 50}	
September 18	"Tengo que colgar"^{Banda MS}	"Amor del bueno"^{Calibre 50}	
September 25	"Amor del bueno"^{Calibre 50}	"Amor del bueno"^{Calibre 50}	
October 2	"Tengo que colgar"^{Banda MS}	"Amor del bueno"^{Calibre 50}	
October 9	"Tengo que colgar"^{Banda MS}	"Amor del bueno"^{Calibre 50}	
October 16	"Tengo que colgar"^{Banda MS}	"Qué caro estoy pagando"^{La Adictiva Banda San José de Mesillas}	
October 23	"Tengo que colgar"^{Banda MS}	"Qué caro estoy pagando"^{La Adictiva Banda San José de Mesillas}	
October 30	"Por enamorarme"^{Los Plebes del Rancho}	"Por enamorarme"^{Los Plebes del Rancho}	
November 6	"Por enamorarme"^{Los Plebes del Rancho}	"Por enamorarme"^{Los Plebes del Rancho}	
November 13	"Por enamorarme"^{Los Plebes del Rancho}	"Por enamorarme"^{Los Plebes del Rancho}	
November 20	"Tengo que colgar"^{Banda MS}	"Por enamorarme"^{Los Plebes del Rancho}	
November 27	"Por enamorarme"^{Los Plebes del Rancho}	"Por enamorarme"^{Los Plebes del Rancho}	
December 4	"Regresa, hermosa"^{Gerardo Ortiz}	"Por enamorarme"^{Los Plebes del Rancho}	
December 11	"Por enamorarme"^{Los Plebes del Rancho}	"Por enamorarme"^{Los Plebes del Rancho}	
December 18	"Por enamorarme"^{Los Plebes del Rancho}	"Por enamorarme"^{Los Plebes del Rancho}	
December 25	"Por enamorarme"^{Los Plebes del Rancho}	"Siempre te voy a querer"^{Calibre 50}	

=== Anglo ===
Issue date	Song (Audience)	Song (Spins)	Ref.
January 3	"Hello"^{Adele}	"Hello"^{Adele}	
January 10	"Hello"^{Adele}	"Hello"^{Adele}	
January 17	"Hello"^{Adele}	"Hello"^{Adele}	
January 24	"Hello"^{Adele}	"Hello"^{Adele}	
January 31	"Adventure of a Lifetime"^{Coldplay}	"Hello"^{Adele}	
February 7	"Adventure of a Lifetime"^{Coldplay}	"Hello"^{Adele}	
February 14	"Adventure of a Lifetime"^{Coldplay}	"Adventure of a Lifetime"^{Coldplay}	
February 21	"Adventure of a Lifetime"^{Coldplay}	"Love Yourself"^{Justin Bieber}	
February 28	"Adventure of a Lifetime"^{Coldplay}	"Love Yourself"^{Justin Bieber}	
March 6	"Stressed Out"^{Twenty One Pilots}	"Love Yourself"^{Justin Bieber}	
March 13	"Stressed Out"^{Twenty One Pilots}	"Love Yourself"^{Justin Bieber}	
March 20	"Stressed Out"^{Twenty One Pilots}	"Work"^{Rihanna ft. Drake}	
March 27	"Stressed Out"^{Twenty One Pilots}	"Stressed Out"^{Twenty One Pilots}	
April 3	"Stressed Out"^{Twenty One Pilots}	"Stressed Out"^{Twenty One Pilots}	
April 10	"Stressed Out"^{Twenty One Pilots}	"Work"^{Rihanna ft. Drake}	
April 17	"Stressed Out"^{Twenty One Pilots}	"Stressed Out"^{Twenty One Pilots}	
April 24	"Stressed Out"^{Twenty One Pilots}	"Stressed Out"^{Twenty One Pilots}	
1 May	"Stressed Out"^{Twenty One Pilots}	"Stressed Out"^{Twenty One Pilots}	
8 May	"Faded"^{Alan Walker}	"Stressed Out"^{Twenty One Pilots}	
15 May	"Middle"^{DJ Snake ft. Bipolar Sunshine}	"Middle"^{DJ Snake ft. Bipolar Sunshine}	
22 May	"Middle"^{DJ Snake ft. Bipolar Sunshine}	"Middle"^{DJ Snake ft. Bipolar Sunshine}	
29 May	"Middle"^{DJ Snake ft. Bipolar Sunshine}	"Middle"^{DJ Snake ft. Bipolar Sunshine}	
June 5	"Can't Stop the Feeling!"^{Justin Timberlake}	"Can't Stop the Feeling!"^{Justin Timberlake}	
June 12	"Can't Stop the Feeling!"^{Justin Timberlake}	"Can't Stop the Feeling!"^{Justin Timberlake}	
June 19	"Can't Stop the Feeling!"^{Justin Timberlake}	"Can't Stop the Feeling!"^{Justin Timberlake}	
June 26	"Can't Stop the Feeling!"^{Justin Timberlake}	"Can't Stop the Feeling!"^{Justin Timberlake}	
July 3	"Can't Stop the Feeling!"^{Justin Timberlake}	"Can't Stop the Feeling!"^{Justin Timberlake}	
July 10	"Can't Stop the Feeling!"^{Justin Timberlake}	"This Is What You Came For"^{Calvin Harris ft. Rihanna}	
July 17	"Can't Stop the Feeling!"^{Justin Timberlake}	"Can't Stop the Feeling!"^{Justin Timberlake}	
July 24	"Can't Stop the Feeling!"^{Justin Timberlake}	"Duele el Corazón"^{Enrique Iglesias ft. Wisin}	
July 31	"This Girl"^{Kungs ft. Cookin' on 3 Burners}	"This Is What You Came For"^{Calvin Harris ft. Rihanna}	
August 7	"This Girl"^{Kungs ft. Cookin' on 3 Burners}	"This Is What You Came For"^{Calvin Harris ft. Rihanna}	
August 14	"This Girl"^{Kungs ft. Cookin' on 3 Burners}	"This Is What You Came For"^{Calvin Harris ft. Rihanna}	
August 21	"This Girl"^{Kungs ft. Cookin' on 3 Burners}	"This Is What You Came For"^{Calvin Harris ft. Rihanna}	
August 28	"This Girl"^{Kungs ft. Cookin' on 3 Burners}	"This Girl"^{Kungs ft. Cookin' on 3 Burners}	
September 4	"This Girl"^{Kungs ft. Cookin' on 3 Burners}	"This Girl"^{Kungs ft. Cookin' on 3 Burners}	
September 11	"This Girl"^{Kungs ft. Cookin' on 3 Burners}	"This Girl"^{Kungs ft. Cookin' on 3 Burners}	
September 18	"This Girl"^{Kungs ft. Cookin' on 3 Burners}	"This Girl"^{Kungs ft. Cookin' on 3 Burners}	
September 25	"Let Me Love You"^{DJ Snake ft. Justin Bieber}	"Let Me Love You"^{DJ Snake ft. Justin Bieber}	
October 2	"Let Me Love You"^{DJ Snake ft. Justin Bieber}	"Let Me Love You"^{DJ Snake ft. Justin Bieber}	
October 9	"Let Me Love You"^{DJ Snake ft. Justin Bieber}	"Let Me Love You"^{DJ Snake ft. Justin Bieber}	
October 16	"Let Me Love You"^{DJ Snake ft. Justin Bieber}	"Vente pa' cá"^{Ricky Martin ft. Maluma}	
October 23	"Let Me Love You"^{DJ Snake ft. Justin Bieber}	"Let Me Love You"^{DJ Snake ft. Justin Bieber}	
October 30	"The Greatest"^{Sia ft. Kendrick Lamar}	"Let Me Love You"^{DJ Snake ft. Justin Bieber}	
November 6	"Starboy"^{The Weeknd ft. Daft Punk}	"Let Me Love You"^{DJ Snake ft. Justin Bieber}	
November 13	"My Way"^{Calvin Harris}	"Let Me Love You"^{DJ Snake ft. Justin Bieber}	
November 20	"My Way"^{Calvin Harris}	"Starboy"^{The Weeknd ft. Daft Punk}	
November 27	"My Way"^{Calvin Harris}	"Starboy"^{The Weeknd ft. Daft Punk}	
December 4	"My Way"^{Calvin Harris}	"24K Magic"^{Bruno Mars}	
December 11	"My Way"^{Calvin Harris}	"24K Magic"^{Bruno Mars}	
December 18	"Rockabye"^{Clean Bandit ft. Anne-Marie & Sean Paul}	"24K Magic"^{Bruno Mars}	
December 25	"Rockabye"^{Clean Bandit ft. Anne-Marie & Sean Paul}	"24K Magic"^{Bruno Mars}	

== Chart history (streaming) ==
The yellow background indicates the best-performing song of 2016.

Issue date	Song	Artist(s)	Ref.
January 7	"Sorry"	Justin Bieber	
February 4	"Love Yourself"	Justin Bieber	
February 11	"Love Yourself"	Justin Bieber	
March 3	"Work"	Rihanna ft. Drake	
March 10	"Work"	Rihanna ft. Drake	
March 17	"Work"	Rihanna ft. Drake	
March 24	"Work"	Rihanna ft. Drake	
April 7	"Work"	Rihanna ft. Drake	
April 21	"Work"	Rihanna ft. Drake	
April 28	"Middle"	DJ Snake ft. Bipolar Sunshine	
12 May	"One Dance"	Drake ft. Wizkid and Kyla	
June 16	"One Dance"	Drake ft. Wizkid and Kyla	
July 28	"One Dance"	Drake ft. Wizkid and Kyla	
August 25	"One Dance"	Drake ft. Wizkid and Kyla	
October 6	"Closer"	The Chainsmokers ft. Halsey	
December 8	"Reggaetón Lento (Bailemos)"	CNCO	
December 15	"Chantaje"	Shakira ft. Maluma	
December 22	"Chantaje"	Shakira ft. Maluma	

== See also ==
- List of number-one albums of 2016 (Mexico)
- List of Top 100 songs for 2016 in Mexico
