= Betancourth =

Betancourth is a surname. Notable people with the surname include:

- Arley Betancourth (born 1975), Colombian footballer
- Daniel Betancourth (born 1980), Ecuadorian singer
- Juliana Betancourth (born 1986), Colombian actress
- Robin Betancourth (born 1991), Guatemalan footballer
