= La Voz Ecuador =

- Genre: Talent show
- Created by: John de Mol Jr.
- Presented by: Carlos Luís Andrade; Constanza Báez; Andrea Hurtado
- Judges: Daniel Betancourth; Jerry Rivera; Jorge Villamizar; Marta Sánchez; Américo; Paty Cantú; Joey Montana
- Country of origin: Ecuador
- Original language: Spanish
- No. of seasons: 2

Production
- Production locations: Quito, Ecuador
- Running time: 60 min.

Original release
- Network: Teleamazonas
- Release: 5 October 2015 – 6 August 2016

Related
- The Voice (franchise); The Voice (American TV series); The Voice of Holland; The Voice Chile; La Voz Colombia

La Voz Ecuador (Spanish: The Voice Ecuador) is an Ecuadorian reality talent show that premiered on Teleamazonas in 2015. Based on the reality singing competition The Voice of Holland, the series was created by Dutch television producer John de Mol Jr.

== Overview ==
The series is part of The Voice franchise and is based on a similar competition format in the Netherlands entitled The Voice of Holland won by Ben Saunders. The Ecuadorian series is hosted by Carlos Luís Andrade with Constanza Báez serving as the backstage and social networking correspondent. The winner will receive a record deal with Universal Republic.

=== Format ===
The series consists of three phases: a blind audition, a battle phase, and live performance shows. Four judges/coaches, all noteworthy recording artists, choose teams of contestants through a blind audition process. Each judge has the length of the auditioner's performance (about one minute) to decide if he or she wants that singer on his or her team; if two or more judges want the same singer (as happens frequently), the singer has the final choice of coach.

Each team of singers is mentored and developed by its respective coach. In the second stage, called the battle phase, coaches have two of their team members battle against each other directly by singing the same song together, with the coach choosing which team member to advance from each of individual "battles" into the first live round. Within that first live round, the surviving four acts from each team again compete head-to-head, with public votes determining one of two acts from each team that will advance to the final eight, while the coach chooses which of the remaining three acts comprises the other performer remaining on the team.

In the final phase, the remaining contestants compete against each other in live broadcasts. The television audience and the coaches have equal say 50/50 in deciding who moves on to the final 4 phase. With one team member remaining for each coach, the (final 4) contestants compete against each other in the finale with the outcome decided solely by public vote.

=== Coaches ===
Seasons
Coach	1	2
Jerry Rivera		
Daniel Betancourth		
Marta Sanchez		
Jorge Villamizar		
Joey Montana		
Paty Cantú		
Américo		

Coaches' line-up by chairs order
Season	Year	Coaches			
Season	Year	1	2	3	4
1	2015	Jerry Rivera	Daniel Betancourth	Marta Sánchez	Jorge Villamizar
2	2016	Joey Montana	Paty Cantú	Américo	Daniel Betancourth

== Series overview ==
Season	Aired	Winner	Runner-up	Third place	Fourth place	Winning coach	Host	Backstage host	Coaches (chairs' order)			
Season	Aired	Winner	Runner-up	Third place	Fourth place	Winning coach	Host	Backstage host	1	2	3	4
1	2015	Gustavo Vicuña	Paola Villacis	Manuela Mora	Omid Forootan	Jerry Rivera	Carlos Luís Andrade	Costanza Baez	Jerry	Daniel	Marta	Coqui
2	2016	Antonio Guerrero	David Altamirano	Fernando del Rio	Verónica Macías	Paty Cantú	Carlos Luís Andrade	Andrea Hurtado	Joey	Paty	Américo	Daniel
