= List of number-one songs of 2017 (Panama) =

This is a list of the number-one songs of 2017 in Panama. The charts are published by Monitor Latino, based on airplay across radio stations in Panama using the Radio Tracking Data, LLC in real time. The chart week runs from Monday to Sunday.

During 2017, five singles reached number one in Panama. Of those, all five were collaborations. In total, eleven acts topped the chart as either lead or featured artists, with eight—Zion & Lennox, Maluma, Daddy Yankee, Justin Bieber, Beyoncé, Willy William, Joey Montana and Sebastián Yatra—achieving their first number-one single in Panama.

In Panama, the best-performing single of 2017 was "Despacito" by Luis Fonsi and Daddy Yankee featuring Justin Bieber. The song, currently holds the record for the longest-running number-one song in Panama, spending a record-extending 24 consecutive weeks topping the Panamanian charts. It also became the second song to debut at number one in Panama, and first since J Balvin's 2016 single, "Safari".

Joey Montana became the first Panamanian act to top the charts as his collaboration with Sebastián Yatra, "Suena El Dembow" reached number one in late 2017, becoming for both Montana and Yatra, their first number-one song in Panama. The song also became the fifth longest-running number-one song in the country, spending 11 non-consecutive weeks atop the charts.

J Balvin became the only act to have more than one number one song in 2017, with him earning two songs: "Otra Vez" featuring Zion & Lennox, and "Mi Gente (Remix)" with Willy William featuring Beyoncé.

== Chart history ==
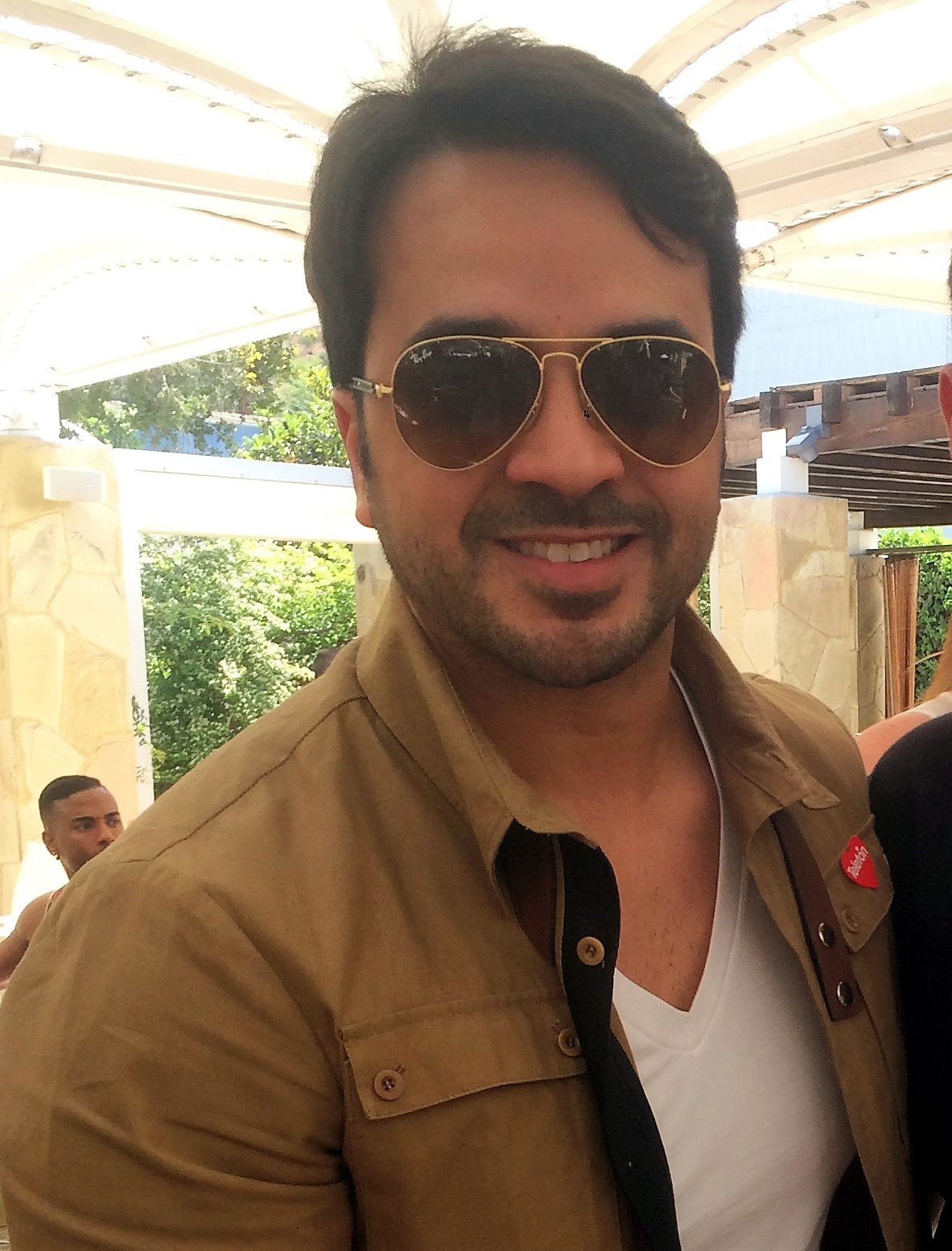
"Despacito" by Luis Fonsi (pictured) became the best-performing single of 2017 in Panama, and currently holds the record for the longest-running number-one song in the country, with 24 consecutive weeks atop the charts.

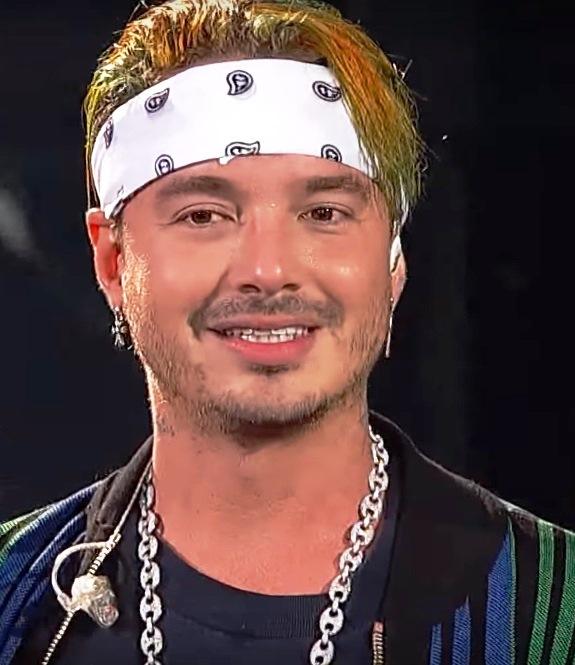
J Balvin (pictured) at the time earned three number-one singles in Panama since 2016, with "Safari", "Otra Vez" and "Mi Gente (Remix)", earning his own record as the act with the most number-one songs in Panama.

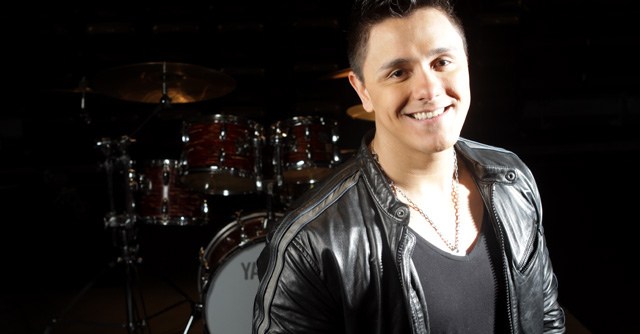
Joey Montana (pictured) became the first Panamanian act to top the charts with "Suena El Dembow".

Key
†	Indicates best-performing single of 2017

Issue date	Song	Artist	Reference
2 January	"Otra Vez"	Zion & Lennox featuring J Balvin	
9 January	"Vente Pa' Ca"	Ricky Martin featuring Maluma	
16 January	"Despacito" †	Luis Fonsi and Daddy Yankee featuring Justin Bieber	
23 January	"Despacito" †	Luis Fonsi and Daddy Yankee featuring Justin Bieber	
30 January	"Despacito" †	Luis Fonsi and Daddy Yankee featuring Justin Bieber	
6 February	"Despacito" †	Luis Fonsi and Daddy Yankee featuring Justin Bieber	
13 February	"Despacito" †	Luis Fonsi and Daddy Yankee featuring Justin Bieber	
20 February	"Despacito" †	Luis Fonsi and Daddy Yankee featuring Justin Bieber	
27 February	"Despacito" †	Luis Fonsi and Daddy Yankee featuring Justin Bieber	
6 March	"Despacito" †	Luis Fonsi and Daddy Yankee featuring Justin Bieber	
13 March	"Despacito" †	Luis Fonsi and Daddy Yankee featuring Justin Bieber	
20 March	"Despacito" †	Luis Fonsi and Daddy Yankee featuring Justin Bieber	
27 March	"Despacito" †	Luis Fonsi and Daddy Yankee featuring Justin Bieber	
3 April	"Despacito" †	Luis Fonsi and Daddy Yankee featuring Justin Bieber	
10 April	"Despacito" †	Luis Fonsi and Daddy Yankee featuring Justin Bieber	
17 April	"Despacito" †	Luis Fonsi and Daddy Yankee featuring Justin Bieber	
24 April	"Despacito" †	Luis Fonsi and Daddy Yankee featuring Justin Bieber	
1 May	"Despacito" †	Luis Fonsi and Daddy Yankee featuring Justin Bieber	
8 May	"Despacito" †	Luis Fonsi and Daddy Yankee featuring Justin Bieber	
15 May	"Despacito" †	Luis Fonsi and Daddy Yankee featuring Justin Bieber	
22 May	"Despacito" †	Luis Fonsi and Daddy Yankee featuring Justin Bieber	
29 May	"Despacito" †	Luis Fonsi and Daddy Yankee featuring Justin Bieber	
5 June	"Despacito" †	Luis Fonsi and Daddy Yankee featuring Justin Bieber	
12 June	"Despacito" †	Luis Fonsi and Daddy Yankee featuring Justin Bieber	
19 June	"Despacito" †	Luis Fonsi and Daddy Yankee featuring Justin Bieber	
26 June	"Despacito" †	Luis Fonsi and Daddy Yankee featuring Justin Bieber	
3 July	"Mi Gente (Remix)"	J Balvin and Willy William featuring Beyoncé	
10 July	"Mi Gente (Remix)"	J Balvin and Willy William featuring Beyoncé	
17 July	"Mi Gente (Remix)"	J Balvin and Willy William featuring Beyoncé	
24 July	"Mi Gente (Remix)"	J Balvin and Willy William featuring Beyoncé	
31 July	"Mi Gente (Remix)"	J Balvin and Willy William featuring Beyoncé	
7 August	"Mi Gente (Remix)"	J Balvin and Willy William featuring Beyoncé	
14 August	"Mi Gente (Remix)"	J Balvin and Willy William featuring Beyoncé	
21 August	"Mi Gente (Remix)"	J Balvin and Willy William featuring Beyoncé	
28 August	"Mi Gente (Remix)"	J Balvin and Willy William featuring Beyoncé	
4 September	"Suena El Dembow"	Joey Montana and Sebastián Yatra	
11 September	"Mi Gente (Remix)"	J Balvin and Willy William featuring Beyoncé	
18 September	"Mi Gente (Remix)"	J Balvin and Willy William featuring Beyoncé	
25 September	"Suena El Dembow"	Joey Montana and Sebastián Yatra	
2 October	"Suena El Dembow"	Joey Montana and Sebastián Yatra	
9 October	"Suena El Dembow"	Joey Montana and Sebastián Yatra	
16 October	"Suena El Dembow"	Joey Montana and Sebastián Yatra	
23 October	"Suena El Dembow"	Joey Montana and Sebastián Yatra	
30 October	"Mi Gente (Remix)"	J Balvin and Willy William featuring Beyoncé	
6 November	"Suena El Dembow"	Joey Montana and Sebastián Yatra	
13 November	"Suena El Dembow"	Joey Montana and Sebastián Yatra	
20 November	"Suena El Dembow"	Joey Montana and Sebastián Yatra	
27 November	"Mi Gente (Remix)"	J Balvin and Willy William featuring Beyoncé	
4 December	"Suena El Dembow"	Joey Montana and Sebastián Yatra	
11 December	"Suena El Dembow"	Joey Montana and Sebastián Yatra	
18 December	"Mi Gente (Remix)"	J Balvin and Willy William featuring Beyoncé	
25 December	"Mi Gente (Remix)"	J Balvin and Willy William featuring Beyoncé	
