= Suena El Dembow =

"Suena el Dembow"

Single by Joey Montana and Sebastián Yatra

from the album La Movida
- Released: September 1, 2017
- Genre: Dance-pop; reggaeton
- Length: 3:15
- Label: Universal Music Latin
- Songwriters: Edgardo Beiro; Edgar Barrera
- Producers: Andrés Torres; Mauricio Rengifo

Joey Montana singles chronology
"Soy como soy" (2017)	"Suena el Dembow" (2017)	"Corazón de metal" (2018)

Sebastián Yatra singles chronology
"Robarte un Beso" (2017)	"Suena el Dembow" (2017)	"Sutra" (2017)

Music video
- "Suena el Dembow" on YouTube

"Suena el Dembow" is a song by Panamanian singer Joey Montana and Colombian singer Sebastián Yatra. It was released on September 1, 2017 as the lead single from Montana's fifth studio album La Movida (2019). It was written by Montana and Edgar Barrera and produced by Andrés Torres and Mauricio Rengifo (who also produced the international hit single "Despacito"). The song was a great success, reaching number one in Panama, as well as the top-ten in Argentina, Costa Rica, Guatemala, Spain and Uruguay.

== Commercial performance ==
In Panama, "Suena el Dembow" debuted at number one on the chart dated September 4, 2017, earning both Montana and Yatra their first number-one single in Panama. The song remained at number one for 11 non-consecutive weeks, becoming the fifth longest-running number one song in the country. The song also made Montana the first Panamanian act to debut at number one in his home country.

Outside Panama, the song peaked at number three in Guatemala, number five in Costa Rica, number six in Argentina and Spain, and number seven in Uruguay. It also reached the top-twenty in Chile, and the top-forty in Colombia and Mexico. The song also peaked at number 15 on the US Hot Latin Songs, which matched the same peak as "Picky" (2015).

== Remix ==
A remix version of the song, featuring Puerto Rican duo Alexis & Fido, was released on March 16, 2018.

== Charts ==
=== Weekly charts ===
Chart (2017–2018)	Peak position
Argentina (Monitor Latino)	6
Chile (Monitor Latino)	14
Colombia (National-Report)	31
Costa Rica (Monitor Latino)	5
Guatemala (Monitor Latino)	3
Mexico Airplay (Billboard)	35
Panama (Monitor Latino)	1
Spain (Promusicae)	6
Uruguay (Monitor Latino)	7
US Hot Latin Songs (Billboard)	15

=== Year-end charts ===
Chart (2017)	Position
Costa Rica (Monitor Latino)	36
Guatemala (Monitor Latino)	76
Honduras (Monitor Latino)	38
Panama (Monitor Latino)	28
Spain (PROMUSICAE)	58

Chart (2018)	Position
Argentina (Monitor Latino)	22
Chile (Monitor Latino)	27
Costa Rica (Monitor Latino)	42
Guatemala (Monitor Latino)	58
Panama (Monitor Latino)	14
Spain (PROMUSICAE)	87

== Certifications ==
Region	Certification	Certified units/sales
Colombia	Platinum	
Ecuador	Platinum	
Mexico (AMPROFON)	2× Platinum+Gold	150,000^{‡}
Peru	Platinum	
Spain (Promusicae)	2× Platinum	80,000^{‡}
United States (RIAA)	Gold (Latin)	30,000^{‡}
Venezuela	Platinum	
^{‡} Sales+streaming figures based on certification alone.

== See also ==
- List of number-one songs of 2017 (Panama)
