= List of number-one Billboard Latin Pop Airplay songs of 2016 =

The Billboard Latin Pop Airplay is a chart that ranks the best-performing Spanish-language Pop music singles of the United States. Published by Billboard magazine, the data are compiled by Nielsen SoundScan based collectively on each single's weekly airplay.

== Chart history ==
Issue date	Song	Artist	Ref
January 2	"Ginza"	J Balvin	
January 9	"Ginza"	J Balvin	
January 16	"Ginza"	J Balvin	
January 23	"Ginza"	J Balvin	
January 30	"Ginza"	J Balvin	
February 6	"Ginza"	J Balvin	
February 13	"Ginza"	J Balvin	
February 20	"Culpa al Corazón"	Prince Royce	
February 27	"Ginza"	J Balvin	
March 5	"Ginza"	J Balvin	
March 12	"Culpa al Corazón"	Prince Royce	
March 19	"Culpa al Corazón"	Prince Royce	
March 26	"Culpa al Corazón"	Prince Royce	
April 2	"Culpa al Corazón"	Prince Royce	
April 9	"Traidora"	Gente De Zona featuring Marc Anthony	
April 16	"Obsesionado"	Farruko	
April 23	"Solo Yo"	Sofía Reyes/Prince Royce	
April 30	"Obsesionado"	Farruko	
May 7	"Duele el Corazón"	Enrique Iglesias featuring Wisin	
May 14	"Duele el Corazón"	Enrique Iglesias featuring Wisin	
May 21	"Duele el Corazón"	Enrique Iglesias featuring Wisin	
May 28	"Duele el Corazón"	Enrique Iglesias featuring Wisin	
June 4	"Duele el Corazón"	Enrique Iglesias featuring Wisin	
June 11	"Duele el Corazón"	Enrique Iglesias featuring Wisin	
June 18	"Duele el Corazón"	Enrique Iglesias featuring Wisin	
June 25	"Duele el Corazón"	Enrique Iglesias featuring Wisin	
July 2	"Duele el Corazón"	Enrique Iglesias featuring Wisin	
July 9	"La Bicicleta"	Carlos Vives & Shakira	
July 16	"La Bicicleta"	Carlos Vives & Shakira	
July 23	"La Bicicleta"	Carlos Vives & Shakira	
July 30	"La Bicicleta"	Carlos Vives & Shakira	
August 6	"La Bicicleta"	Carlos Vives & Shakira	
August 13	"La Bicicleta"	Carlos Vives & Shakira	
August 20	"La Bicicleta"	Carlos Vives & Shakira	
August 27	"La Bicicleta"	Carlos Vives & Shakira	
September 3	"La Bicicleta"	Carlos Vives & Shakira	
September 10	"La Bicicleta"	Carlos Vives & Shakira	
September 17	"La Bicicleta"	Carlos Vives & Shakira	
September 24	"La Bicicleta"	Carlos Vives & Shakira	
October 1	"De Pies A Cabeza"	Maná & Nicky Jam	
October 8	"De Pies A Cabeza"	Maná & Nicky Jam	
October 15	"De Pies A Cabeza"	Maná & Nicky Jam	
October 22	"De Pies A Cabeza"	Maná & Nicky Jam	
October 29	"De Pies A Cabeza"	Maná & Nicky Jam	
November 5	"Vente Pa' Ca"	Ricky Martin	
November 12	"Fuego"	Juanes	
November 19	"Vente Pa' Ca"	Ricky Martin	
November 26	"Safari"	J Balvin featuring Pharrell Williams, BIA & Sky	
December 3	"Chillax"	Farruko featuring Ky-Mani Marley	
December 10	"Vacaciones"	Wisin	
December 17	"Chantaje"	Shakira featuring Maluma	
December 24	"Chantaje"	Shakira featuring Maluma	
December 31	"Chantaje"	Shakira featuring Maluma	
