= List of number-one Billboard Tropical Songs of 2016 =

The Billboard Tropical Airplay chart ranks the best-performing tropical songs of the United States. Published by Billboard magazine, the data are compiled by Nielsen Broadcast Data Systems based collectively on each single's weekly airplay.

== Chart history ==
Issue date	Song	Artist	Ref
January 2	"Dimelo"	India	
January 9	"Ganas de Ti"	Zion & Lennox	
January 16	"Materiali$ta"	Silvestre Dangond x Nicky Jam	
January 23	"Yo Quiero Volver"	Silvio Mora	
January 30	"Como Lo Hacia Yo"	Ken-Y & Nicky Jam	
February 6	"Como Lo Hacia Yo"	Ken-Y & Nicky Jam	
February 13	"Culpa al Corazón"	Prince Royce	
February 20	"Culpa al Corazón"	Prince Royce	
February 27	"Culpa al Corazón"	Prince Royce	
March 5	"Culpa al Corazón"	Prince Royce	
March 12	"Toy Enamorao"	Mozart La Para featuring Sharlene & Nacho	
March 19	"Mambo Para Bailar"	Fuego	
March 26	"Traidora"	Gente de Zona featuring Marc Anthony	
April 2	"Como Lo Hacia Yo"	Ken-Y & Nicky Jam	
April 9	"Traidora"	Gente de Zona featuring Marc Anthony	
April 16	"Traidora"	Gente de Zona featuring Marc Anthony	
April 23	"Traidora"	Gente de Zona featuring Marc Anthony	
April 30	"Si El Mundo Se Acabara"	Los de la Nazza featuring Justin Quiles	
May 7	"Escapate"	Elvis Crespo featuring GrupoMania	
May 14	"Si Esta Casa Hablara"	Joel Santos	
May 21	"Ay Mi Dios"	IAmChino featuring Pitbull, Yandel & Chacal	
May 28	"Shalala"	Tito El Bambino	
June 4	"No Vuelve"	Yunel Cruz	
June 11	"Amor de Verdad"	Charlie Cruz featuring N'Klabe, Frankie Negron, NG2 & Omar Lugo	
June 18	"La Bicicleta"	Carlos Vives & Shakira	
June 25	"Quiero Experimentar"	J Alvarez	
July 2	"Sayonara"	Jonathan Moly featuring Jerry Rivera	
July 9	"La Carretera"	Prince Royce	
July 16	"Imaginar"	Víctor Manuelle + Yandel	
July 23	"Imaginar"	Víctor Manuelle + Yandel	
July 30	"No Le Eches La Culpa A Ella"	Toby Love	
August 6	"Desde El Dia En Que Te Fuiste"	Chocquibtown featuring Wisin	
August 13	"Me Voy A Acostumbrar"	India featuring Juan Gabriel	
August 20	"Shaky Shaky"	Daddy Yankee	
August 27	"Imaginar"	Víctor Manuelle + Yandel	
September 3	"Se Acabo"	Sanluis & Chino y Nacho	
September 10	"Por Fin Te Encontre"	Cali y El Dandee featuring Juan Magan & Sebastián Yatra	
September 17	"Bailar"	Deorro featuring Pitbull & Elvis Crespo	
September 24	"Por Tu Culpa"	24 Horas	
October 1	"Algo Contigo"	Gente De Zona	
October 8	"Como Quisiera"	Domenic Marte	
October 15	"Midnight"	Ez El Ezeta featuring Nengo Flow & Kevin Lyttle	
October 22	"Amorcito Enfermito"	Hector Acosta El Torito	
October 29	"Bailando Todo Se Olvida"	Aymee Nuviola featuring Baby Rasta & Gringo	
November 5	"Bailame Despacio"	Xantos	
November 12	"El Rey Estafador"	Alejandra	
November 19	"Muneca"	Gabo Parisi featuring Farruko	
November 26	"Ya Quiero"	Domino Saints	
December 3	"Vente Pa' Ca"	Ricky Martin featuring Maluma	
December 10	"Amorcito Enfermito"	Hector Acosta El Torito	
December 17	"Nos Olvidamos"	Ken-Y	
December 24	"Detras de Ti"	Jory Boy	
December 31	"Olvidame y Pega La Vuelta"	Jennifer Lopez & Marc Anthony	
