= List of number-one albums of 2016 (Mexico) =

Top 100 Mexico is a record chart published weekly by AMPROFON (Asociación Mexicana de Productores de Fonogramas y Videogramas), a non-profit organization composed by Mexican and multinational record companies. This association tracks record sales (physical and digital) in Mexico. Since May 2013, some positions of the chart are published in the official Twitter account of AMPROFON including the number one position.

== Chart history ==
The yellow background indicates the best-performing album of 2016.

Chart date	Album	Artist	Reference
January 7	Los Dúo, Vol. 2	Juan Gabriel	
January 14	Los Dúo, Vol. 2	Juan Gabriel	
January 21	Los Dúo, Vol. 2	Juan Gabriel	
January 28	Los Dúo, Vol. 2	Juan Gabriel	
February 4	Vive	José María Napoleón	
February 11	Yo Creo	Carlos Rivera	
February 18	Vive	José María Napoleón	
February 25	Vive	José María Napoleón	
March 3	Vive	José María Napoleón	
March 10	Vive	José María Napoleón	
March 17	Vive	José María Napoleón	
March 24	Evolution	CD9	
March 31	Mind of Mine	Zayn	
April 7	60 Aniversario	Sonora Santanera	
April 14	60 Aniversario	Sonora Santanera	
April 21	60 Aniversario	Sonora Santanera	
April 28	Evolution	CD9	
May 5	60 Aniversario	Sonora Santanera	
May 12	60 Aniversario	Sonora Santanera	
May 19	60 Aniversario	Sonora Santanera	
May 26	Dangerous Woman	Ariana Grande	
June 2	60 Aniversario	Sonora Santanera	
June 9	60 Aniversario	Sonora Santanera	
June 16	Immortal	Gloria Trevi	
June 23	60 Aniversario	Sonora Santanera	
June 30	Aquí Estoy	Mario Bautista	
July 7	Energia	J Balvin	
July 14	Aquí Estoy	Mario Bautista	
July 21	Evolution	CD9	
July 28	60 Aniversario	Sonora Santanera	
August 4	Aquí Estoy	Mario Bautista	
August 11	Aquí Estoy	Mario Bautista	
August 18	Vestido de Etiqueta por Eduardo Magallanes	Juan Gabriel	
August 26	Vestido de Etiqueta por Eduardo Magallanes	Juan Gabriel	—
September 1	Vestido de Etiqueta por Eduardo Magallanes	Juan Gabriel	—
September 8	Vestido de Etiqueta por Eduardo Magallanes	Juan Gabriel	
September 15	Un Azteca en el Azteca	Vicente Fernández	
September 22	Un Azteca en el Azteca	Vicente Fernández	
September 29	Un Azteca en el Azteca	Vicente Fernández	
October 6	De Plaza en Plaza Cumbia Sinfónica	Los Ángeles Azules	
October 13	De Plaza en Plaza Cumbia Sinfónica	Los Ángeles Azules	
October 20	De Plaza en Plaza Cumbia Sinfónica	Los Ángeles Azules	
October 27	Joanne	Lady Gaga	
November 3	Juntos por la Sonora	Sonora Dinamita	
November 10	De Plaza en Plaza Cumbia Sinfónica	Los Ángeles Azules	
November 17	Evolution	CD9	
November 24	Hardwired... to Self-Destruct	Metallica	
December 1	Hardwired... to Self-Destruct	Metallica	
December 8	Hardwired... to Self-Destruct	Metallica	
December 15	Hardwired... to Self-Destruct	Metallica	
December 22	Hardwired... to Self-Destruct	Metallica	
December 29	Hardwired... to Self-Destruct	Metallica	

== See also ==
- List of number-one songs of 2016 (Mexico)
- List of Top 100 songs for 2016 in Mexico
