= 2017 Premios Juventud =

14th Premios Juventud
- Date: July 6, 2017
- Location: Watsco Center in Coral Gables, Florida
- Hosted by: Alejandra Espinoza and Danilo Carrera
- Preshow hosts: Francisca Lachapel, Borja Voces, Daniela di Giacomo, and Sebastián Villalobos
- Website: Official Page

Television/radio coverage
- Network: Univision

The 14th Annual Premios Juventud (Youth Awards) were broadcast by Univision on July 6, 2017.

The theme for this edition was "Betting on the Future" and focused more on music, removing categories awarding actors, telenovelas, and pop culture. It was hosted by Alejandra Espinoza and Danilo Carrera.

== Performers ==
Artist (s)	Song (s)
Justin Quiles	"Egoísta"
Karol G	"A Ella"
CNCO	"Hey DJ"
Maluma & Marc Anthony	"Felices los 4"
Wisin, Ozuna, Bad Bunny & De La Ghetto	"Escápate Conmigo (Remix)"
Calibre 50	"Siempre Te Voy A Querer"
DNCE	"Kissing Strangers"
Chyno Miranda, Wisin & Gente de Zona	"Quédate Conmigo"
J Balvin	"Mi Gente"
Enrique Iglesias & Zion y Lennox & Descemer Bueno	"Súbeme La Radio"
Ozuna	"Dile Que Tu Me Quieres"
Nacho	"Bailame"
Farruko	"Don't Let Go"
Farruko & Jacob Forever	"Quiéreme"
Ulices Chaidez y Sus Plebes	"Te Regalo"
Iggy Azalea	"Switch"
Chris Jeday, Ozuna, J Balvin & Arcangel	"Ahora Dice"
Sebastián Yatra & Nacho	"Alguien Robó"
Maluma & Piso 21	"Me Llamas"
Maluma	"Chantaje" & "Vente Pa' Ca""
Yandel	"Mi Religión"
Silvestre Dangond	"Por Un Beso De Tu Boca"
Carlos Rivera & Gente de Zona	"Lo Digo"

== Winners and nominees ==
The nominees for the 14th Premios Juventud were announced on May 19, 2017.

The Perfect Combination	Best Song For Dancing
"Despacito" - Luis Fonsi & Daddy Yankee; "La Bicicleta" - Shakira & Carlos Vives; "Chantaje" - Shakira & Maluma; "Otra Vez" - Zion & Lennox & J Balvin; "Súbeme La Radio" - Enrique Iglesias & Descemer Bueno & Zion & Lennox; "Vente Pa' Ca" - Ricky Martin & Maluma	"Shaky Shaky" - Daddy Yankee; "Chantaje" - Shakira ft. Maluma; "Hey Ma" - Pitbull & J Balvin ft. Camila Cabello; "Las Ultras" - Calibre 50; "Vacaciones" - Wisin; "Ya No Me Duele Más" - Silvestre Dangond ft. Farruko
Best Song For Singing	Best Song For Love
"Despacito" - Luis Fonsi ft. Daddy Yankee; "A Poco" - Raul Casillas; "Me Llamas" - Piso 21 ft. Maluma; "Qué Gano Olvidándote" - Reik; "Súbeme La Radio" - Enrique Iglesias ft. Descemer Bueno & Zion & Lennox; "Vente Pa' Ca" - Ricky Martin ft. Maluma	"Ya Me Enteré" - Reik; "Adiós Amor" - Christian Nodal; "Deja Que Te Bese" - Alejandro Sanz ft. Marc Anthony; "Me Soltaste" - Jesse & Joy; "Tengo Que Colgar" - Banda Sinaloense Ms De Sergio Lizarraga; "Tu y Yo" - Tommy Torres ft. Daddy Yankee
Best Song For "Chillin"	Best Song For "La Troca"
"Reggaetón Lento (Bailemos)" – CNCO; "Afuera Está Lloviendo" – Julión Álvarez Y Su Norteño Banda; "La Bicicleta" – Carlos Vives & Shakira; "Otra Vez" – Zion & Lennox ft. J Balvin; "Sigo Extrañandote" - J Balvin; "Te Regalo" - Ulices Chaidez Y Sus Plebes	"Siempre Te Voy A Querer" – Calibre 50; "A Ver A Que Horas" - Banda Carnaval; "Adios Amor" - Christian Nodal; "El Gallero" – El Komander; "Es Tuyo Mi Amor" – Banda Sinaloense Ms De Sergio Lizárraga; "Se Defiende" – La Séptima Banda
Best Video	Artist Revelation
"Sigo Extrañándote" - J Balvin; "Andas En Mi Cabeza" – Chino & Nacho ft. Daddy Yankee; "Desencuentro" - Residente ft. Soko; "Don’t Let Go" - Farruko; "Soy Yo" - Bomba Estéreo; "Tu Si Sabes Quererme" - Natalia Lafourcade	Ozuna; Bad Bunny; Christian Nodal; Danny Ocean; Justin Quiles; Morat; Piso 21; Ulices Chaidez y sus Plebes
Best Fashionista	Artist Instagram
Maluma; Becky G; J Balvin; Luis Coronel; Sofía Reyes; Victoria La Mala	Maluma; J Balvin; Chiquis Rivera; Gerardo Ortiz; Nicky Jam; Wisin

=== Special recognitions ===
- Youth Idol Award - Enrique Iglesias
- Super Sonic Award - Maluma

=== Agentes de Cambio ===
"Agentes de Cambio" are a group of young people who were recognized for their contributions to society through their different causes around the benefit of their community.

- Dante Alvarado León
- Iván Ceja
- Justino Mora
- Nalleli Cobo
- Sarahí Espinoza Salamanca
- Xiuhtezcatl Martínez
