= Picky (song) =

Single by Joey Montana

from the album Picky Back to the Roots
- Released: June 23, 2015
- Genre: Dance-pop; reggaeton
- Length: 3:01
- Label: Capitol Latin
- Songwriters: Edgardo Beiro; Victor Delgado

Joey Montana singles chronology
"Moribundo" (2014)	"Picky" (2015)	"Hola" (2016)

Music video
- "Picky" on YouTube

"Picky" is a song by Panamanian singer Joey Montana. It was released on June 23, 2015 as the second single from Montana's fourth studio album Picky Back to the Roots (2016).

== Chart performance ==
"Picky" reached number one in Mexico, on the Mexico Airplay chart issue dated May 14, 2016. The song displaced Spanish Latin pop singer Enrique Iglesias's "Duele el Corazón" from the top of the chart. "Picky" also peaked at number two in Spain, at number 11 in his native Panama, and at number 15 on the US Hot Latin Songs, becoming Montana's breakthrough song.

As of May 2020, the song's music video has over 1.25 billion views on YouTube.

== Composition ==
"Picky" by Joey Montana has a tempo of 94 BPM and is in the key of A♭ major. The song is set in a 4/4 time signature and features high energy. The chord progression is A♭–Fm–D♭–E♭.

== Remixes ==
Joey Montana released three remixes of the song, all featuring Akon and Mohombi, on March 11, 2016.

== Charts ==
=== Weekly charts ===
Chart (2015–2017)	Peak position
Mexico Airplay (Billboard)	1
Panama (Monitor Latino)	11
Spain (Promusicae)	2
Sweden Heatseeker (Sverigetopplistan)	14
US Hot Latin Songs (Billboard)	15
US Latin Airplay (Billboard)	35
US Latin Rhythm Airplay (Billboard)	12

=== Year-end charts ===
Chart (2016)	Position
Spain (PROMUSICAE)	9
US Hot Latin Songs (Billboard)	79
Chart (2017)	Position
Panama (Monitor Latino)	31
Chart (2018)	Position
Panama (Monitor Latino)	98

== Certifications ==
Region	Certification	Certified units/sales
Brazil (Pro-Música Brasil)	Gold	30,000^{‡}
Mexico (AMPROFON)	Diamond	300,000^{‡}
Spain (Promusicae)	4× Platinum	160,000^{‡}
Spain (Promusicae) Remix version	3× Platinum	180,000^{‡}
United States (RIAA)	Platinum (Latin)	60,000^{‡}
^{‡} Sales+streaming figures based on certification alone.

== See also ==
- List of number-one songs of 2016 (Mexico)
