= Vente Pa' Ca =

2016 single by Ricky Martin

Single by Ricky Martin featuring Maluma
- Language: Spanish
- Released: September 23, 2016
- Genre: Reggaeton; pop
- Length: 4:19
- Label: Sony Latin
- Songwriters: Ricky Martin; Juan Luis Londoño Arias; Nermin Harambašić; Anne Judith Stokke Wik; Carl Ryden; Lars "ChiefOne" Pedersen; Mauricio Montaner; Ricardo Montaner; Ronny Vidar Svendsen; Justin Stein
- Producer: Alexander Castillo

Ricky Martin singles chronology
"Perdóname" (2016)	"Vente Pa' Ca" (2016)	"Fiebre" (2018)

Maluma singles chronology
"Sin Contrato" (2016)	"Vente Pa' Ca" (2016)	"Cuatro Babys" (2016)

Delta Goodrem singles chronology
"The River" (2016)	"Vente Pa' Ca" (2016)	"Think About You" (2018)

Music video
- "Vente Pa' Ca" on YouTube

Alternative cover
- Cover artwork for English version with Delta Goodrem

"Vente Pa' Ca" (transl. "Come Over Here") is a song recorded by Puerto Rican singer Ricky Martin, featuring a guest appearance from Colombian singer Maluma. It was co-written by Ricky Martin, Maluma, Nermin Harambašić, Anne Judith Wik, Ronny Svendsen, Carl Ryden, ChiefOne, Mau y Ricky and Justin Stein, while the production was handled by Alexander Castillo. The song was released for digital download and streaming as a single by Sony Music Latin on September 23, 2016. It is a Spanish language reggaeton and pop song, and it contains various sexual innuendos. The song received widely positive reviews from music critics, who complimented its danceable rhythm and fusion of genres. It was ranked as one of the best Latin songs of the year by multiple publications, including The Guardian.

The song was nominated for the awards of Record of the Year and Song of the Year at the 18th Annual Latin Grammy Awards. "Vente Pa' Ca" was one of the most commercially successful Spanish-language songs of 2016, reaching number one in seven countries, including Argentina and Mexico, as well as the top five in Spain and on the Billboard Hot Latin Songs chart in the United States. It also reached the summit of the Billboard Latin Airplay, Latin Pop Airplay, and Tropical Airplay charts. Additionally, it was ranked among the top 10 best performing songs of 2017 in six Latin American countries. The song has received several certifications, including quadruple platinum in Spain.

An accompanying music video, released simultaneously with the song, was directed by Jessy Terrero and filmed at the SLS South Beach Hotel in Miami Beach, Florida. It depicts several parties in different locations in the hotel and has received over 1.9 billion views on YouTube. To promote "Vente Pa' Ca", Martin and Maluma performed it on several television programs and award shows, including both the Premio Lo Nuestro and the Premios Juventud in 2017. Multiple contestants on various music talent shows have covered the song, including Patricia Manterola and Màxim Huerta. Several remixes and other versions have accompanied the song, such as English versions featuring Delta Goodrem, and Wendy of Red Velvet. The latter reached number one on Melon's international music chart.

== Background and release ==
On August 23, 2016, Ricky Martin and Maluma shared a photo of themselves together in Miami, Florida, and announced that they were collaborating on a song together, which would be titled "Vente Pa' Ca". The following day, Billboard revealed the single's release date in an article and mentioned that the song was originally titled "Some Kind of Dream" in English, and was later reverted to Spanish. The article also affirmed that it was Martin's idea to invite Maluma to collaborate for the track. In an interview with El Nuevo Día, Maluma told the newspaper about this collaboration:

My relationship with Ricky Martin is one of admiration, first as a fan, as a friend and colleague. I really appreciate that he called me to do this song. It is something that I still do not realize. Working with him is amazing. He is the most serene person and one who generates the most peace that I have known in the world.

On September 18, 2016, Martin shared the artwork for the single on his social media. The song was released for digital download and streaming by Sony Music Latin on September 23, 2016, as a single, marking the first collaboration between Martin and Maluma. In an interview with Billboard, Maluma told the magazine: "Ricky Martin is one of the artists I wanted to be growing up. He's my idol in the industry."

== Music and lyrics ==
"Vente Pa' Ca"
A 15-second sample of the chorus, which features an upbeat reggaeton melody.

Musically, "Vente Pa' Ca" is a Spanish language upbeat reggaeton and pop song, written by Justin Stein, Martin, Maluma, Nermin Harambašić, Anne Judith Wik, Carl Ryden, ChiefOne, Mau y Ricky, and Ronny Svendsen. Its production was handled by Alexander Castillo, and the song features elements of vallenato and Latin music. The track runs for a total of 4 minutes and 19 seconds, and Billboard described it as "a party track set over a sultry reggaetón beat".

Lyrically, "Vente Pa' Ca" which translates to "Come Here" in English, contains various sexual innuendos, with lyrics including, "Si tú quieres nos bañamos / Si tú quieres nos soplamos / Pa secarnos lo mojao / Si tu boca quiere beso / Y tu cuerpo quiere de eso / Arreglamos" (If you want we can swim / If you want we can dry ourselves / If your mouth wants a kiss / And your body wants that / Then we can manage).

== Critical reception ==
Upon release, "Vente Pa' Ca" was met with universal acclaim from music critics. A writer of Clarín wrote that Martin and Maluma "made several generations dance" with the lyrics of the song. An author of Europa Press described the song as "a single that aims to delve into Latin rhythms and make all of Latin America dance". The Guardian staff named the song a "great record that just makes you want to dance". At Culture Leisure, an author described "Vente Pa' Ca" as "a song with a danceable rhythm that perfectly blends the pop and urban genres". An author of LatinPop Brasil called it "a delicious fusion of rhythms". Los 40 staff described Martin and Maluma as the "Latin Duo of the Year" and stated that they "join forces in the Latin theme" by excellence of 2016, and continued: "Very attentive to this 'Vente Pa' Ca', because it has all the ballots to be the next disco bombshell." Brittny Pierre from Vibe acclaimed the song as "a fun party track". Griselda Flores from Billboard gave the song a positive review, saying it "has us feeling like it's summer all over again". In another article, she named the song "one of the hottest collabs of summer 2016". In his review for Direct Lyrics, Kevin Apaza applauded the song, saying: "It is very catchy, and no doubt clubs in Miami, Latin America and Spain will play it non stop this fall/winter season."

Evan Slead from Entertainment Weekly celebrated the song, labeling it "a modern anthem". Writing for O, The Oprah Magazine, Amanda Mitchell ranked the track as Martin's seventh best song on her 2019 list. Also from O, The Oprah Magazine, Celia Fernandez ranked the track as Maluma's sixth best song on her 2019 list. Suzette Fernandez from Billboard credited it as the song that helped Maluma "to establish his name within the Latin market" and ranked the track among his best collaborations ever. Tommy Calle from Hoy labeled the song "[a] mega hit", and Rolling Stone's Elias Leight labeled it "a billion-views global ear-worm featuring a cheerful appearance from Maluma". Noelia Bertol from Cadena Dial ranked it as one of "Ricky Martin six collaborations that have us moving the skeleton", going on to observe "the way to unite two of the most acclaimed voices in Latin music", and said that the song "met all our expectations, at least!" In another article, she listed the track among his ten "songs that brighten up summers". An author of Cultura Colectiva called it a "hit that's very hard to resist". In his review for Vogue, Esteban Villaseñor ranked the song among Martin's most popular songs.

== Accolades ==
In October 2016, The Guardian placed "Vente Pa' Ca" on their "The 20 best Latin American records of the past 12 months" list. Musica Roots ranked the track as the third Top Latin Song of 2016 and Teletrece ranked it at number 11 on their "15 songs that marked 2016" list. Metro Puerto Rico placed the track on an unranked list of the most listened songs of the 2010s, and Amazon Music ranked it as the 42nd Best Latin song of the decade. Also, NBC News ranked the track at number five on their list of "10 Top Latino Songs to Get You Moving". "Vente Pa' Ca" has received a number of awards and nominations. It was nominated for both Record of the Year and Song of the Year at the 18th Annual Latin Grammy Awards, but lost to "Despacito" by Luis Fonsi featuring Daddy Yankee in the categories.

Awards and nominations for "Vente Pa' Ca"
Organization	Year	Award	Result	Ref.
Latin Music Italian Awards	2016	Best Latin Song of The Year	Nominated	
Latin Music Italian Awards	2016	Best Latin Male Video of The Year	Nominated	
Latin Music Italian Awards	2016	Best Latin Collaboration of The Year	Nominated	
ASCAP Latin Awards	2017	Pop Winning Song	Won	
Latin American Music Awards	2017	Favorite Song — Pop/Rock	Nominated	
Latin Grammy Awards	2017	Record of the Year	Nominated	
Latin Grammy Awards	2017	Song of the Year	Nominated	
MTV Millennial Awards	2017	Song of the Year	Nominated	
Premios Juventud	2017	Perfect Combo	Nominated	
Premios Juventud	2017	Best Song For Singing	Nominated	
Premios Quiero	2017	Best Pop Video	Nominated	
BMI Latin Awards	2018	Latin Publisher of the Year	Won	
BMI Latin Awards	2018	Award Winning Songs	Won	

== Commercial performance ==
"Vente Pa' Ca" was one of the biggest Spanish-language songs of 2016. The song debuted at number four on the US Billboard Hot Latin Songs chart on October 15, 2016, with a first-week tally of 5,000 downloads sold, 1.1 million streams, and 14 million radio impressions. Thus, it became Martin's 27th top 10 on the chart and Maluma's third. The song also debuted at number one on both the US Latin Digital Song Sales and Latin Airplay charts, becoming Martin's second and Maluma's first number one on the former. On the latter, it became Martin's 16th crowning hit and Maluma's third, making Martin continue to hold the second-most number ones on the list, trailing only Enrique Iglesias. The song later peaked at number one on both the Latin Pop Airplay and Tropical Airplay charts, becoming Martin's 11th number one and Maluma's first on the former, and Martin's fifth number one and Maluma's third on the latter. Additionally, it reached number seven on the US Latin Streaming Songs on January 21, 2017, and has since become Martin's longest-charting hit, spending 39 weeks on the chart. The song finished 2017 as the 16th biggest hit on the US Latin Streaming Songs year-end chart.

Besides the United States, "Vente Pa' Ca" hit the charts in several European countries, including the top 20 in the Netherlands and Hungary. In Italy and Switzerland, the song was certified platinum and double platinum by the Federazione Industria Musicale Italiana (FIMI) and the International Federation of the Phonographic Industry (IFPI), for track-equivalent sales of over 50,000 and 60,000 units, respectively. In Spain's El portal de Música chart, it debuted at number 29 on October 2, 2016. The song subsequently peaked at number two on the chart for four consecutive weeks, being held off the top spot by "La Bicicleta" (2016) by Carlos Vives and Shakira in its first week, and by "Safari" (2016) by J Balvin in the next three weeks. "Vente Pa' Ca" was later certified quadruple platinum by the Productores de Música de España (PROMUSICAE), for track-equivalent sales of over 160,000 units in the country. In Latin America, it peaked at number one in Argentina, Chile, Ecuador, Guatemala, Mexico, Panama, and Uruguay, and reached the top 10 in Colombia, Dominican Republic, Paraguay, Venezuela, and on the Monitor Latino Latin America chart. The track was later ranked as one of the top 10 best performing songs of 2017 in Argentina, Chile, Ecuador, Guatemala, Panama, and Uruguay. In Mexico, the song was certified diamond + triple platinum + gold by the Asociación Mexicana de Productores de Fonogramas y Videogramas (AMPROFON), for track-equivalent sales of over 510,000 units. It was also certified triple platinum by Pro-Música Brasil for track-equivalent sales of over 180,000 units in Brazil. Additionally, it was certified gold by the Music Canada, for track-equivalent sales of over 40,000 units in Canada.

== Music video ==
A screenshot from the music video, depicting Martin and Maluma coincidentally running into each other while at a luxurious hotel.

On August 23, 2016, Martin shared a selfie of himself and Maluma on the set of filming "Vente Pa' Ca" music video. In the first images of the video, the singers were seen wearing fully white outfits and having fun next to a beautiful woman with brown hair. The following day, Billboard announced that it would be released alongside the song on September 23, 2016. The video was filmed at the SLS South Beach Hotel in Miami Beach, Florida, and directed by Dominican director Jessy Terrero, who had previously directed the videos for Martin's singles "Adrenalina" and "Que Se Sienta El Deseo" & Executive Produced by Santiago Salviche. The visual begins with Martin and Maluma accidentally running into each other while at a luxurious hotel. After sharing a selfie together on social media, the two singers host a beach party at the SLS South Beach Hotel, which has a Miami-style. It includes several parties in different locations of the hotel, comprising a rooftop soiree and a pool party. Cristal Mesa from mitú named the visual Martin's seventh best music video on her 2018 list, and an author of Cultura Colectiva listed it among the "13 Videos to Appreciate Ricky Martin's Talent and Sickening Good Looks". As of September 2025, the visual has received over 1.9 billion views on YouTube, making it the ninth most viewed Spanish-language video of all time.

== Live performances ==
Martin and Maluma gave their first live performance of "Vente Pa' Ca" on Facebook Live during Martin's the One World Tour concert in London on September 23, 2016. The song was also included on the set lists for Martin's the All In residency, the Ricky Martin en Concierto, the Movimiento Tour, and the Enrique Iglesias and Ricky Martin Live in Concert tour, and Maluma's the Pretty Boy, Dirty Boy World Tour, the F.A.M.E. Tour, the 11:11 World Tour, and the Papi Juancho Tour. Martin delivered a performance of the track at the 29th Lo Nuestro Awards on February 23, 2017, and the following day, Maluma performed it along with his other hits during the 58th Viña del Mar International Song Festival. Later that year, Maluma performed a medley of "Chantaje" and "Vente Pa' Ca" at the 14th Annual Premios Juventud on July 6. Martin also performed "Vente Pa' Ca" along with his other hits during the 61st Viña del Mar International Song Festival on February 23, 2020. He filmed his live performance of the song live from MGM Grand Garden Arena during the Enrique Iglesias and Ricky Martin Live in Concert tour for the Global Citizen Live in September 2021.

== Appearances in media and other versions ==
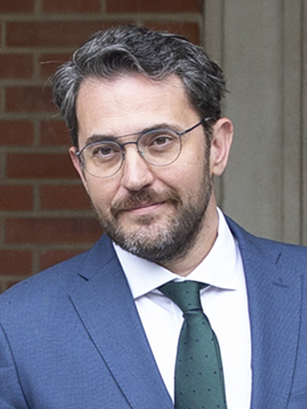
Màxim Huerta (pictured) covered "Vente Pa' Ca" as "Gamba" on Mask Singer: Adivina quién canta.

"Vente Pa' Ca" has been covered by several contestants on various music talent shows. Irvin Díaz Escobar and Alejo Dueñas competed in a battle of covering the song on season two of La Voz Argentina in 2018, which Escobar won. Patricia Manterola performed the song as "Lechuza" on the first season of the Mexican television series ¿Quién es la máscara? in 2019. In 2020, on its second season, Christian Chávez and Mané de la Parra performed it as "Pantera" and "Quetzal", respectively. In the same year, Màxim Huerta performed the track as "Gamba" on the first season of Mask Singer: Adivina quién canta. "Vente Pa' Ca" has been used four times in Argentine dance competition television series Bailando por un Sueño; Agustín Casanova and Florencia Vigna danced to it on the 2017 season in August, María Sol Pérez and Fernando Bertona on the same season in December, Benjamín Alfonso, Camila Mendes, and Stéfano de Gregorio on the 2018 season, and Mora Godoy and Bianca Iovenitti on the 2019 season. Additionally, Simon Zachenhuber and Patricija Belousova danced to it on the fourteenth season of Let's Dance in 2021.

A single, titled "Vente Pa' Ca (feat. Maluma) [Remixes]", which includes three remixes of the song, was released alongside the original on September 23, 2016. One of the remixes was produced by Eliot 'El Mago D'Oz', who had also worked on a remix for Martin's previous single "Perdóname" (2016). Almost three months later, on December 27, an English version of the song, featuring Australian singer Delta Goodrem, was released for digital download and streaming by Sony Music Latin. Goodrem tweeted about it: "My dear friend Ricky Martin and I, got together to record a special version of 'Vente Pa' Ca'." Another English version was released on the same date, featuring K-pop singer Wendy of South Korean girl group Red Velvet, while co-produced by Sony Music Entertainment and K-pop's main production agency SM Entertainment. The song reached number one on Melon's international music chart. In 2021, Alexis Hodoyan-Gastelum from Remezcla ranked the song as one of her seven favorite "Latin x K-Pop Collaborations", saying "Wendy's input gave the popetón song a more tender, youthful touch". Also, Gizmo Chronicle staff placed it on their five "Favorite Latin x K-Pop Collaborations" list in the same year. Two other versions, featuring Taiwanese singer A-Lin and Indian singer Akasa Singh, were released for digital download and streaming by Sony Music Latin on February 14 and 17, 2017, respectively.

== Track listings ==
- Digital download and streaming
1. "Vente Pa' Ca" (feat. Maluma) – 4:19
- Digital download and streaming – remixes
1. "Vente Pa' Ca" (feat. Maluma) [Urban Remix] – 3:57
2. "Vente Pa' Ca" (feat. Maluma) [Eliot 'El Mago D'Oz' Urban Remix] – 3:22
3. "Vente Pa' Ca" (feat. Maluma) [Versión Salsa] – 3:47
- Digital download and streaming (Delta Goodrem version)
1. "Vente Pa' Ca" (feat. Delta Goodrem) – 4:09

- Digital download and streaming (Wendy version)
1. "Vente Pa' Ca" (feat. Wendy) – 4:09
- Digital download and streaming (A-Lin version)
1. "Vente Pa' Ca" (feat. A-Lin) – 4:09
- Digital download and streaming (Akasa version)
1. "Vente Pa' Ca" (feat. Akasa) – 4:09
- Digital download and streaming – A-Class remix
1. "Vente Pa' Ca" (feat. Maluma) (A-Class Remix) – 3:56

== Credits and personnel ==
Credits adapted from Tidal.

- Ricky Martin – vocal, composer, lyricist, associated performer
- Maluma – vocal, composer, lyricist, associated performer, featured artist
- Justin Stein – composer, lyricist
- Nermin Harambašić – composer, lyricist
- Anne Judith Stokke Wik – composer, lyricist
- Carl Ryden – composer, lyricist
- Lars "ChiefOne" Pedersen – composer, lyricist
- Mauricio Montaner – composer, lyricist
- Ricardo Montaner – composer, lyricist
- Ronny Vidar Svendsen – composer, lyricist
- Alexander Castillo – producer, recording engineer
- Julio Reyes Copello – recording engineer, vocal producer
- Natalia Ramírez – recording engineer
- Gene Grimaldi – mastering engineer
- Clint Gibbs – mixing engineer

== Charts ==
=== Weekly charts ===
Weekly peak performance for "Vente Pa' Ca"
Chart (2016–2021)	Peak position
Argentina (Monitor Latino)	1
Belgium (Ultratip Bubbling Under Wallonia)	29
Chile (Monitor Latino)	1
Colombia (National-Report)	2
Dominican Republic (Monitor Latino)	9
Ecuador (National-Report)	1
Finland Download (Latauslista)	23
France (SNEP)	164
Guatemala (Monitor Latino)	1
Honduras Pop (Monitor Latino)	10
Hungary (Dance Top 40)	19
Hungary (Rádiós Top 40)	38
Hungary (Single Top 40)	14
Italy (FIMI)	65
Latin America (Monitor Latino)	8
Mexico (Billboard Mexican Airplay)	1
Mexico (Monitor Latino)	1
Netherlands (Single Tip)	19
Nicaragua Pop (Monitor Latino)	8
Panama (Monitor Latino)	1
Paraguay (Monitor Latino)	5
Peru (Monitor Latino)	13
Portugal (AFP)	42
Slovakia Airplay (ČNS IFPI)	61
Slovakia Singles Digital (ČNS IFPI)	75
Spain (Promusicae)	2
Switzerland (Schweizer Hitparade)	72
Uruguay (Monitor Latino)	1
US Bubbling Under Hot 100 (Billboard)	25
US Hot Latin Songs (Billboard)	4
US Latin Airplay (Billboard)	1
US Latin Pop Airplay (Billboard)	1
US Tropical Airplay (Billboard)	1
Venezuela (Monitor Latino)	10

=== Monthly charts ===
Monthly chart performance for "Vente Pa' Ca"
Chart (2016–2017)	Peak position
Argentina (CAPIF)	1
Uruguay (CUDISCO)	1

=== Year-end charts ===
2016 year-end chart performance for "Vente Pa' Ca"
Chart (2016)	Position
Argentina (Monitor Latino)	15
Chile (Monitor Latino)	8
Colombia (Monitor Latino)	45
Ecuador (Monitor Latino)	83
Guatemala (Monitor Latino)	10
Mexico (Monitor Latino)	83
Panama (Monitor Latino)	3
Spain (PROMUSICAE)	63
US Hot Latin Songs (Billboard)	58
US Latin Pop Airplay (Billboard)	46
Venezuela (Monitor Latino)	47

2017 year-end chart performance for "Vente Pa' Ca"
Chart (2017)	Position
Argentina (Monitor Latino)	8
Bolivia (Monitor Latino)	14
Chile (Monitor Latino)	5
Colombia (Monitor Latino)	25
Dominican Republic (Monitor Latino)	59
Ecuador (Monitor Latino)	9
El Salvador (Monitor Latino)	88
Guatemala (Monitor Latino)	10
Honduras (Monitor Latino)	91
Hungary (Single Top 40)	80
Latin America (Monitor Latino)	20
Mexico (Monitor Latino)	57
Nicaragua Pop (Monitor Latino)	32
Panama (Monitor Latino)	9
Paraguay (Monitor Latino)	27
Peru (Monitor Latino)	54
Portugal Full Track Downloads (AFP)	12
Spain (PROMUSICAE)	27
Uruguay (Monitor Latino)	2
US Hot Latin Songs (Billboard)	29
US Latin Pop Airplay (Billboard)	35
Venezuela (Monitor Latino)	40

2018 year-end chart performance for "Vente Pa' Ca"
Chart (2018)	Position
Argentina (Monitor Latino)	75
Bolivia (Monitor Latino)	91
Chile (Monitor Latino)	41
Dominican Republic Pop (Monitor Latino)	57
Honduras Pop (Monitor Latino)	21
Hungary (Dance Top 40)	63
Nicaragua Pop (Monitor Latino)	100
Panama (Monitor Latino)	72
Portugal Full Track Download (AFP)	185
Puerto Rico Pop (Monitor Latino)	54
Venezuela Pop (Monitor Latino)	96

2019 year-end chart performance for "Vente Pa' Ca"
Chart (2019)	Position
Chile Pop (Monitor Latino)	66
Dominican Republic Pop (Monitor Latino)	68
Honduras Pop (Monitor Latino)	33
Puerto Rico Pop (Monitor Latino)	64
Venezuela Pop (Monitor Latino)	98

2020 year-end chart performance for "Vente Pa' Ca"
Chart (2020)	Position
Chile Pop (Monitor Latino)	79
Honduras Pop (Monitor Latino)	36
Nicaragua Pop (Monitor Latino)	91
Panama Pop (Monitor Latino)	57

2021 year-end chart performance for "Vente Pa' Ca"
Chart (2021)	Position
Ecuador Pop (Monitor Latino)	96
Honduras Pop (Monitor Latino)	74
Panama Pop (Monitor Latino)	67

2022 year-end chart performance for "Vente Pa' Ca"
Chart (2022)	Position
Panama Pop (Monitor Latino)	64
Puerto Rico Pop (Monitor Latino)	96

2023 year-end chart performance for "Vente Pa' Ca"
Chart (2023)	Position
Chile Pop (Monitor Latino)	45
Panama Pop (Monitor Latino)	88

== Certifications ==
Certifications and sales for "Vente Pa' Ca"
Region	Certification	Certified units/sales
Argentina (CAPIF)	Gold	10,000^{*}
Brazil (Pro-Música Brasil)	3× Platinum	180,000^{‡}
Canada (Music Canada)	Gold	40,000^{‡}
France (SNEP)	Gold	100,000^{‡}
Italy (FIMI)	Platinum	50,000^{‡}
Mexico (AMPROFON)	Diamond+3× Platinum+Gold	510,000^{‡}
Poland (ZPAV)	Platinum	50,000^{‡}
Spain (Promusicae)	4× Platinum	160,000^{‡}
Sweden (GLF)	Gold	20,000^{‡}
Switzerland (IFPI Switzerland)	2× Platinum	60,000^{‡}
Streaming
Chile (Profovi)	Platinum	8,000,000
^{*} Sales figures based on certification alone.^{‡} Sales+streaming figures based on certification alone.

== Release history ==
Release dates and formats for "Vente Pa' Ca"
Region	Date	Format	Version	Label	Ref(s)
Various	September 23, 2016	Digital download; streaming	Original	Sony Latin	
Various	September 23, 2016	Digital download; streaming	Remixes	Sony Latin	
Latin America	September 23, 2016	Contemporary hit radio	Original	Sony Latin	
Russia	October 17, 2016	Contemporary hit radio	Original	Sony Latin	
Italy	November 25, 2016	Contemporary hit radio	Original	Sony Latin	
Various	December 27, 2016	Digital download; streaming	feat. Delta Goodrem	Sony Latin	
Various	December 27, 2016	Digital download; streaming	feat. Wendy	Sony Latin	
Various	February 14, 2017	Digital download; streaming	feat. A-Lin	Sony Latin	
Various	February 17, 2017	Digital download; streaming	feat. Akasa	Sony Latin	
Various	June 23, 2017	Digital download; streaming	A-Class Remix	Sony Latin	

== See also ==
- List of airplay number-one hits in Argentina
- List of best-selling singles in Spain
- List of Billboard Hot Latin Songs and Latin Airplay number ones of 2016
- List of number-one Billboard Latin Pop Airplay songs of 2016
- List of Billboard Mexico Airplay number ones
- List of number-one Billboard Tropical Songs of 2016
- List of number-one songs of 2016 (Mexico)
- List of number-one songs of 2017 (Mexico)
- List of number-one songs of 2017 (Panama)
