= Daniel Betancourth =

Ecuadorian singer

Daniel Betancourth (born November 16, 1980, in Guayaquil) is an Ecuadorian singer. He came to prominence in 2007. He is also known as Daniel Beta.
