= Joey Montana =

Panamanian reggaeton singer (born 1982)

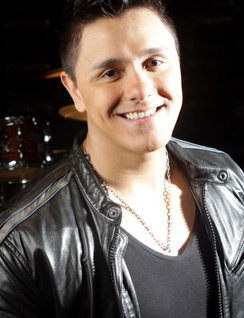

Background information
- Birth name: Edgardo Antonio Miranda Beiró
- Also known as: MC Joe (with La Factoría)
- Born: May 3, 1981 (age 44) Boquete, Chiriquí, Panama
- Genres: Reggaeton; Latin pop
- Occupations: Singer; songwriter
- Years active: 2000–present
- Labels: Montana; Capitol Latin; Universal
- Formerly of: La Factoría

Edgardo Antonio Miranda Beiró (born May 3, 1981), better known as Joey Montana, is a Panamanian reggaeton singer. He is best known for the hit singles "Picky" and his collaboration with Sebastián Yatra, "Suena El Dembow".

== Biography ==
After five years of career with La Factoría, he left the group to pursue his solo career. In 2003, he graduated as a physiotherapist. In July 2004, he composed a successful song, and he was recommended to become a solo singer. He released his first album titled Sin Cadenas, in which he had the collaboration of Ángel López (former member of Son by Four) in the single "Que Dios Te Castigue", produced by Predikador. Later in 2010, he released his second album, Flow Con Clase, which includes the national hit singles "La Melodía", "Tus Ojos No Me Ven" and his second collaboration with Ángel López on "No Lo Vuelvo a Hacer". In 2014, Montana released his third album, Único, with the album's title track achieving success in Panama and the United States, where it reached number 35 on the US Billboard Latin Airplay chart.

In 2015, he released the song "Picky" and quickly became a huge success in Latin America and Spain. The song topped the charts in Mexico and was certified Diamond. It also reached number two in Spain and was certified four-times Platinum. Additionally, it reached the top-twenty in Panama and the US Billboard Hot Latin Songs chart, becoming Montana's breakthrough song, and managing to sign with his current label Universal Music Latin. In 2016, Montana was one of the coaches on the second season of La Voz Ecuador, where he won the hearts and respect of all the Ecuadorian people.

In September 2017, Montana released his collaboration with Colombian singer Sebastián Yatra, "Suena El Dembow", which became his first number-one hit in Panama, and was certified two-times platinum in Mexico and Spain. Following this, Montana achieved several chart-topping singles in Panama, including "Rosas o espinas", "Viral Pisadinha", "Ya no más" and "Desesperado (Voy a Tomar)". To date, Montana is the Panamanian act with the most number-one songs in his home country.

== Discography ==
=== Studio albums ===
List of studio albums, with selected details, chart positions, sales, and certifications
Title	Studio album details	Peak chart positions	
Title	Studio album details	US Latin	US Latin Rhythm
Sin Cadenas	Released: November 7, 2007; Label: MMV Entertainment; Format: CD, digital download	—	—
Flow Con Clase	Released: September 24, 2010; Label: Capitol Latin; Format: CD, digital download	54	6
Único	Released: May 6, 2014; Label: Capitol Latin; Format: CD, digital download	—	—
Picky Back To the Roots	Released: September 9, 2016; Label: Capitol Latin; Format: CD, digital download	—	12
La Movida	Released: October 31, 2019; Label: Universal Music Latin; Format: CD, digital download	—	—

==== Singles ====
List of singles as lead artist, with selected chart positions and certifications, showing year released and album name
Title	Year	Peak chart positions										Certifications	Album
Title	Year	PAN	ARG	CHI	COL	CR	GUA	HON	MEX	SPA	US Latin	Certifications	Album
"Que Dios Te Castigue" (featuring Angél Lopez)	2007	—	—	—	—	—	—	—	—	—	—		Sin Cadenas
"Si Te Vas" (featuring Rob G & 713 Seville)	2007	—	—	—	—	—	—	—	—	—	—		Sin Cadenas
"Sin Ti"	2008	—	—	—	—	—	—	—	—	—	—		El Dueño del Negocio
"Lo Ajeno" (featuring Principal)	2008	—	—	—	—	—	—	—	—	—	—		El Dueño del Negocio
"No Lo Vuelvo Hacer" (featuring Angél Lopez)	2009	—	—	—	—	—	—	—	—	—	—		Flow Con Clase
"Tus Ojos No Me Ven"	2010	—	—	—	—	—	—	—	—	—	25		Flow Con Clase
"La Melodía"	2011	—	—	—	—	—	—	—	— (Note: "La Melodía" did not enter the Billboard Mexico Airplay, but peaked at number 19 on Mexico Pop Espanol Airplay chart.)	—	19		Flow Con Clase
"Ni una Lágrima"	2011	—	—	—	—	—	—	—	—	—	—		Flow Con Clase
"Oye Mi Amor"	2012	—	—	—	—	—	—	—	—	—	—		Non-album singles
"Único"	2012	—	—	—	—	—	—	—	—	—	— (Note: "Único" did not enter the Billboard Hot Latin Songs, but peaked at number 35 on the Billboard Latin Airplay chart.)		Único
"Love & Party" (featuring Juan Magan)	2013	—	—	—	—	—	—	—	—	—	— (Note: "Love & Party" did not enter the Billboard Hot Latin Songs, but peaked at number 44 on the Billboard Latin Airplay chart.)		Único
"Moribundo"	2014	—	—	—	—	—	—	—	—	—	—		Picky Back to the Roots
"Picky"	2015	11	—	—	—	—	—	—	1	2	15	AMPROFON: Diamond; PROMUSICAE: 4× Platinum; RIAA: Platinum (Latin)	Picky Back to the Roots
"Hola"	2016	5	—	—	—	—	—	—	— (Note: "Hola" did not enter the Billboard Mexico Airplay, but peaked at number 29 on Mexico Espanol Airplay chart.)	72	—		Picky Back to the Roots
"Suena El Dembow" (with Sebastián Yatra)	2017	1	6	14	31	5	3	—	35	6	15	AMPROFON: 2× Platinum; PROMUSICAE: 2× Platinum; RIAA: Gold (Latin)	La Movida
"Corazón de metal"	2018	4	—	—	—	—	—	—	—	—	—		La Movida
"La movida"	2018	13	—	—	—	—	—	—	—	—	—		La Movida
"Rosas o espinas"	2018	1	—	—	—	—	—	—	—	—	—		La Movida
"Viral Pisadinha" (with Felipe Araujo)	2019	1	—	—	—	—	—	—	—	—	—		La Movida
"Yo te llamo" (with De La Ghetto and Noriel)	2019	6	—	—	—	—	—	18	—	—	—		La Movida
"No te va" (with Lalo Ebratt)	2019	—	—	—	—	—	—	—	—	—	—		La Movida
"El Japonés" (with Naoto)	2019	—	—	—	—	—	—	—	—	—	—		Non-album singles
"Ya No Más" (with Nacho and Yandel featuring Sebastian Yatra)	2019	1	—	—	—	—	—	—	—	—	—		Non-album singles
"Desesperado (Voy a Tomar)" (with Greeicy and Cali y El Dandee)	2020	1	—	—	62	—	—	—	—	—	—		Non-album singles
"Bebe" (featuring Boza)	2021	8	—	—	—	—	—	—	—	—	—		Non-album singles
"—" denotes a recording that did not chart or was not released in that territory.

==== As featured artist ====
List of singles, with selected chart positions, showing year released and album name
Title	Year	Peak chart positions		Album
Title	Year	MEX	MEX Espanol	Album
"Animals" (Lin C featuring Joey Montana & Mohombi)	2016	—	—	
"Volvamos" (Dulce María featuring Joey Montana)	2016	47	15	DM
"Soy Como Soy" (Nicole Cherry featuring Joey Montana)	2017	—	—	
"Las Locuras Mías" (Omar Chaparro featuring Joey Montana)	2021	1	—	

'Notes
