= Farruko discography =

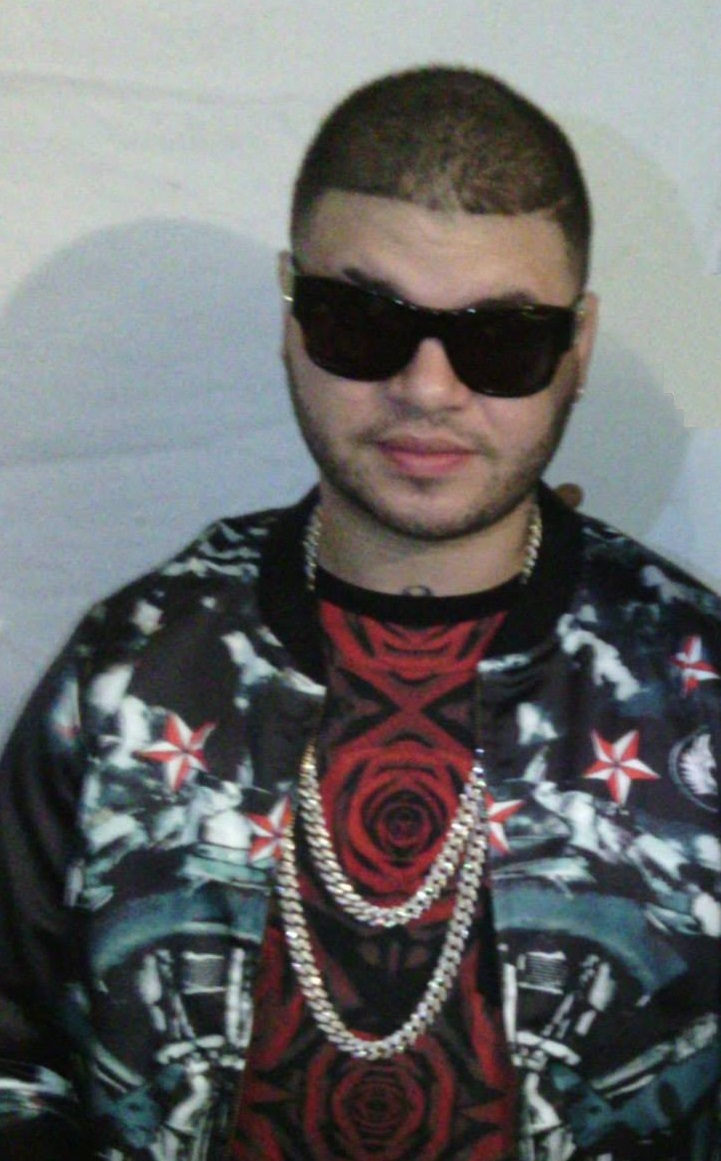
- Farruko in 2014
- Studio albums: 8
- Compilation albums: 5
- Singles: 54
- Music videos: 46
- Mixtape compilations: 1

Puerto Rican singer Farruko has released six studio albums, 54 singles, one mixtape, and five compilation albums. Collaborations are also included.

Farruko has sung reggaeton, merengue, bachata, pop, Latin dance, Latin trap, and reggae. He has collaborated with artists such as Pitbull, Daddy Yankee, Don Omar, Arcángel, Ñengo Flow, Bad Bunny and Yandel.

Farruko released his first song "Sexo Fuera Del Planeta" in 2009 through the Internet and gained fame in Puerto Rico. Farruko released his first album El Talento Del Bloque which produced hit singles, "Su Hija Me Gusta" featuring José Feliciano, "Nena Fichu", and "Te Iré a Buscar". His second album, released in 2012, featured collaborations with Puerto Rican superstar Daddy Yankee, and Cuban star Micha. The album spawned six singles, but only three of them were international hits: "Va a Ser Abuela", "Feel the Rhythm", and "Titerito". He was invited to Sábado Gigante and Esta Noche Tu Night to perform the hit single "Feel the Rhythm". The album was nominated for the Latin Grammy Award for Best Urban Music Album in 2012. Farruko's third album, Imperio Nazza: Farruko Edition, was more successful, with Daddy Yankee collaborating with Farruko once again. J Alvarez also featured on the album along with Arcángel, De La Ghetto, Reykon, and Zion & Lennox. The album received high ratings, and it was a fan favorite album. The smash hits were "Besas Tan Bien" and "Mi Vida No Va a Cambiar" alongside Arcángel, the latter not having been a single on the album. "Voy a 100" was also a number one hit in Latin America.

== Albums ==
=== Studio albums ===
Title	Album details	Peak chart positions					Certifications (sales thresholds)
Title	Album details	FRA	NLD	SPA	US	US Lat	Certifications (sales thresholds)
El Talento del Bloque	Released: June 29, 2010; Label: Universal Music Latino	—	—	—	—	50	
TMPR The Most Powerful Rookie	Released: May 22, 2012; Label: El Cartel	—	—	—	—	19	
Imperio Nazza: Farruko Edition	Released: May 24, 2013; Label: El Cartel	—	—	—	—	13	
Farruko Presenta: Los Menores	Released: October 27, 2014; Label: Carbon Fiber Music	—	—	—	90	1	
Visionary	Released: October 23, 2015; Label: Sony Music Latin	—	—	—	124	1	RIAA: Platinum (Latin); AMPROFON: Platinum
TrapXFicante	Released: September 15, 2017; Label: Sony Music Latin	—	—	—	184	3	RIAA: Platinum (Latin); AMPROFON: Gold
Gangalee	Released: April 26, 2019; Label: Sony Music Latin	96	—	—	80	2	RIAA: 6× Platinum (Latin)
La 167	Released: October 1, 2021; Label: Sony Music Latin	51	40	23	26	1	RIAA: 5× Platinum (Latin); AMPROFON: Platinum
Cvrbon Vrmor (C_DE: G_D.O.N.)	Released: May 2, 2024; Label: Sony Music Latin	—	—	—	—	—	
Cvrbon Vrmor	Released: October 17, 2024; Label: Sony Music Latin	—	—	—	— (Note: Crvon Vrmor did not enter the Billboard 200, but peaked at #28 on the Billboard Top Christian Albums)	—	RIAA: Platinum (Latin)
"—" denotes items that did not chart or were not released in that territory.

=== Compilation albums ===
Title	Album details	Peaks
Title	Album details	US Latin
En Letra de Otro	Released: August 23, 2019; Label: Sony Music Latin	46

== Singles ==
=== As lead artist ===
List of singles, with selected chart positions, showing year released and album name
Title	Year	Peak chart positions					Certifications	Album
Title	Year	ARG	MEX	SPA	US	US Latin	Certifications	Album
"Casa de Playa"	2010	—	—	—	—	—		El Talento Del Bloque
"Traime a Tu Amiga" (featuring Arcángel and Julio Voltio)	2010	—	—	—	—	—	RIAA: 2× Platinum (Latin)	El Talento Del Bloque
"Hola Beba"	2010	—	—	—	—	—		TMPR The Most Powerful Rookie
"Hoy"	2011	—	—	—	—	—		Non-album singles
"Cositas Que Haciamos"	2011	—	—		—	—		Non-album singles
"Feel the Rhythm"	2012	—	—	—	—	—		TMPR The Most Powerful Rookie
"Titerito"	2012	—	—	—	—	—	RIAA: Platinum (Latin)	TMPR The Most Powerful Rookie
"Va a Ser Abuela"	2012	—	—	—	—	—	RIAA: Gold (Latin)	TMPR The Most Powerful Rookie
"Dale Que Voy"	2012	—	—	—		—	—	Non-album singles
"Crazy in Love" (featuring Natti Natasha)	2013	—	—	—	—	—		Non-album singles
"Besas Tan Bien"	2013	—	—	—	—	35		Imperio Nazza: Farruko Edition
"Boomboneo"	2014	—	—	—	—	—		Non-album single
"Passion Whine" (featuring Sean Paul)	2014	—	—	—	—	10	RIAA: 3× Platinum (Latin)	Farruko Presents: Los Menores
"La Nueva Gerencia" (with Arcángel)	2014	—	—	—	—	—		Farruko Presents: Los Menores
"Lejos de Aquí" (Remix) (with Yandel)	2015	—	—	36	—	—	PROMUSICAE: Platinum	Non-album single
"Chapi Chapi" (featuring Messiah)	2015	—	—	—	—	—		Visionary
"Sunset" (featuring Nicky Jam and Shaggy)	2015	—	—	57	—	3	RIAA: 4× Platinum (Latin); AMPROFON: Gold	Visionary
"Liberace" (featuring Anuel AA)	2016	—	—	—	—	—	RIAA: Gold (Latin)	TrapXficante
"Diles" (with Bad Bunny and Ozuna featuring Arcángel, Ñengo Flow, DJ Luian and Mambo Kingz)	2016	—	—	85	—	—	RIAA: 4× Platinum (Latin); PROMUSICAE: Gold	Non-album singles
"Diabla" (Remix) (with Lary Over and Bad Bunny)	2017	—	—	—	—	—	RIAA: Platinum (Latin)	Non-album singles
"Don't Let Go"	2017	—	—	—	—	27		TrapXficante
"47" (Remix) (with Anuel AA, Ñengo Flow, Casper Mágico, Darell, Bad Bunny, Lil Geniuz and Sinfónico)	2017	—	—	—	—	—	RIAA: Platinum (Latin)	Non-album singles
"Blockia" (with Bad Bunny featuring DJ Luian and Mambo Kingz)	2017	—	—	—	—	48	RIAA: Gold (Latin)	Non-album singles
"Que Tengo Que Hacer" (with Lary Over)	2017	—	—	—	—	—	RIAA: Platinum (Latin)	Non-album singles
"Loco Enamorado" (with Abraham Mateo and Christian Daniel)	2017	22	22	13	—	22	RIAA: 4× Platinum (Latin); AMPROFON: 2× Platinum; PROMUSICAE: 2× Platinum	A Cámara Lenta
"Krippy Kush" (with Bad Bunny and Rvssian)	2017	—	—	20	75	5	RIAA: 16× Platinum (Latin); AMPROFON: 4× Platinum; PROMUSICAE: Platinum	TrapXficante
"Recuerdos" (with Kelmitt and Lary Over)	2017	—	—	—	—	—	RIAA: Gold (Latin)	Non-album singles
"Tacos Altos" (with Arcángel and Noriel featuring Bryant Myers and Álex Gárgolas)	2017	—	—	—	—	—	RIAA: Gold (Latin)	Non-album singles
"Banda de Camión" (Remix) (with El Alfa and De La Ghetto featuring Zion, Bryant Myers, Villano Sam and Noriel)	2017	—	—	—	—	—	RIAA: Gold (Latin)	Non-album singles
"Inolvidable"	2018	—	—	—	—	37	RIAA: Platinum (Latin)	Gangalee
"Ella Fuma" (with Plan B, Chencho Corleone, Brytiago and Darell)	2018	33	—	—	—	—	RIAA: Platinum (Latin)	Non-album singles
"Coolant"	2018	—	—	—	—	—	RIAA: Platinum (Latin)	Non-album singles
"Ponle" (with Rvssian and J Balvin)	2018	50	37	74	—	23	AMPROFON: 3× Platinum+Gold	Gangalee
"Calma" (Remix) (with Pedro Capó)	2018	1	1	2	71	3	RIAA: 25× Platinum (Latin); PROMUSICAE: 5× Platinum	Gangalee
"Baby" (with Amenazzy and Nicky Jam)	2018	40	—	31	—	46	RIAA: 2× Platinum (Latin); PROMUSICAE: Gold	Non-album singles
"Nadie"	2019	70	—	—	—	26	RIAA: Platinum (Latin)	Gangalee
"Pa Olvidarte" (Remix) (with ChocQuibTown, Zion & Lennox and Manuel Turizo)	2019	—	—	66	—	—	RIAA: 3× Platinum (Latin)	Non-album singles
"Caliente" (with Darell)	2019	—	—	44	—	—	RIAA: Platinum (Latin)	Non-album singles
"Si se da" (with Myke Towers)	2019	13	—	9	—	11	RIAA: 11× Platinum (Latin); PROMUSICAE: 2× Platinum	Non-album singles
"On My Way" (with Alan Walker and Sabrina Carpenter)	2019	—	—	—	—	—		World of Walker
"Calma" (Alicia Remix) (with Pedro Capó and Alicia Keys)	2019	1	—	—	—	—		Gangalee
"Ramayama" (with Don Omar)	2019	72	—	—	—	43		The Last Album
"No" (with Milly and Sech featuring Miky Woodz and Gigolo Y La Exce)	2019	—	—	—	—	48		Non-album single
"Rebota" (Remix) (with Guaynaa and Nicky Jam featuring Becky G and Sech)	2019	18	—	24	—	28	RIAA: Platinum (Latin); PROMUSICAE: Gold	BRB Be Right Back
"Date tu Guille" (with Milly and Myke Towers featuring Lary Over, Rauw Alejandro and Sharo Towers)	2019	—	—	—	—	—	RIAA: Platinum (Latin)	Honey Bee
"Si Se Da" (Remix) (with Myke Towers, Arcángel, Sech and Zion)	2019	—	—	24	—	—	RIAA: 13× Platinum (Latin); PROMUSICAE: Gold	Non-album singles
"Fantasías" (with Rauw Alejandro)	2019	2	—	4	—	12	RIAA: 19× Platinum (Latin); PROMUSICAE: 3× Platinum	Non-album singles
"El Favor" (with Dímelo Flow, Nicky Jam, Sech, Zion and Lunay)	2019	26	33	30	—	21	RIAA: 2× Platinum (Latin); PROMUSICAE: Gold	Non-album singles
"105 F" (Remix) (with Kevvo and Chencho Corleone featuring Arcángel, Ñengo Flow, Darell, Myke Towers and Brytiago)	2019	—	—	32	—	—	RIAA: 4× Platinum (Latin); PROMUSICAE: Platinum	Non-album singles
"Nadie" (Remix) (with Ozuna and Lunay featuring Sech & Sharo Towers)	2019	—	—	55	—	—		Non-album singles
"No Le Bajes" (with El Coyote The Show and Tito El Bambino)	2019	51	—	—	—	39		Non-album singles
"Fantasías" (Unplugged) (with Rauw Alejandro)	2019	—	—	—	—	—	RIAA: Platinum (Latin)	Non-album singles
"Canam" (with Miky Woodz)	2019	—	—	—	—	—		Non-album singles
"La Playa" (Remix) (with Myke Towers and Maluma)	2019	46	—	64	—	—	RIAA: 3× Platinum (Latin)	Non-album singles
"3G" (Remix) (with Wisin & Yandel featuring Jon Z, Don Chezina, Chencho Corleone and Myke Towers)	2020	—	—	36	—	—	PROMUSICAE: Platinum	Non-album singles
"Si Me Dices Que Sí" (with Reik and Camilo)	2020	48	6	85	—	14	RIAA: Platinum (Latin); AMPROFON: 4× Platinum+Gold; PROMUSICAE: Platinum	Non-album singles
"Tiburones" (Remix) (with Ricky Martin)	2020	—	—	—	—	—		Non-album singles
"Perreo Intenso" (with Ankhal and Guaynaa featuring Kevvo)	2020	—	—	—	—	—	RIAA: Gold (Latin)	Non-album singles
"La Tóxica"	2020	5	26	16	95	4	RIAA: 9× Platinum (Latin); AMPROFON: Diamond+2× Platinum+Gold; PROMUSICAE: Platinum	La 167
"Condena" (with Brytiago)	2020	—	—	—	—	—	RIAA: Gold (Latin)	Orgánico
"Perfecta" (with Luis Fonsi)	2020	49	—	—	—	30		Ley de Gravedad
"La Tóxica" (Remix) (with Sech and Myke Towers featuring Jay Wheeler and Tempo)	2020	—	—	54	—	—		Non-album single
"No Te Enamores" (Remix) (with Milly and Nio García featuring Jay Wheeler and Amenazzy)	2020	47	—	5	—	30	RIAA: Platinum (Latin); PROMUSICAE: 2× Platinum	Honey Bee
"Singapur" (Remix) (with El Alfa and Myke Towers featuring Chencho Corleone and Justin Quiles)	2020	38	—	—	—	46		Non-album singles
"No Hago Coro" (with Ghetto and Nino Freestyle)	2020	—	—	—	—	31	RIAA: 2× Platinum (Latin)	Non-album singles
"XOXA" (with El Alfa)	2021	—	—	—	—	47		Premium
"Oh, Mamá" (with Myke Towers)	2021	—	48	72	—	45		Premium
"Ten Cuidado" (with Pitbull and Iamchino featuring El Alfa and Omar Courtz)	2021	—	—	—	—	50	RIAA: Platinum (Latin)	Non-album singles
"Aire" (with Steve Aoki)	2021	—	—	—	—	—		Non-album singles
"Rápido" (with Amenazzy, Myke Towers and Rochy RD)	2021	—	—	27	—	—	PROMUSICAE: Gold	F9: The Fast Saga
"Pepas"	2021	3	28	1	25	1	RIAA: 52× Platinum (Latin); AMPROFON: Diamond+Gold; PROMUSICAE: 6× Platinum	La 167
"Curazao" (with El Alfa)	2021	—	—	—	—	34		Non-album single
"El Incomprendido" (with Victor Cardenas and DJ Adoni)	2021	—	—	11	—	13	RIAA: 5× Platinum (Latin); AMPROFON: Gold; PROMUSICAE: Platinum	La 167
"Nazareno"	2022	—	—	—	—	47		Non-album single
"Patio de la Cárcel"	2022	—	—	14	—	—		Non-album single
"Misericordia" (with Onell Díaz)	2023	—	—	—	—	—		Non-album single
"Esta Vida" (with Marshmello)	2023	—	—	—	—	—	RIAA: 2× Platinum (Latin)	Cvrbon Vrmor
"Pasa_je_ro"	2023	—	—	—	—	—		Non-album singles
"Calor" (with Malono Ramos and Ghetto)	2023	—	—	—	—	—		Non-album singles
"Afrobocelli" (with ULLOΛ)	2024	—	—	—	—	—		Transition
"Confía" (with Dalex)	2024	—	—	—	—	—		Transition
"Turbina" (with Austin Millz)	2024	—	—	—	—	—		Cvrbon Vrmor
"San Miguel"	2024	—	—	—	— (Note: "San Miguel" did not enter the Billboard Hot 100, but peaked at No. 5 on the Billboard Hot Christian Songs chart)	—		Non-album single
"Ven Ven" (with Fariana and Alex Sensation featuring Jeon)	2025	—	—	—	—	—		Non-album single
"—" denotes items that did not chart or were not released in that territory.

=== As featured artist ===
List of songs, with selected chart positions, showing year released and album name
Title	Year	Peak chart positions					Certifications	Album
Title	Year	ARG	MEX	SPA	US	US Latin	Certifications	Album
"6 AM" (J Balvin featuring Farruko)	2013	—	24	22	—	3	RIAA: Diamond (Latin); PROMUSICAE: 2× Platinum	La Familia
"Sola" (Jenny la Sexy Voz featuring J Alvarez and Farruko)	2013	—	—	—	—	—		Boy Wonder Presents: Chosen Few Urbano Continues
"Su Forma De Ser" (Durán the Coach featuring Farruko)	2014	—	—	—	—	—		Boy Wonder Presents: Chosen Few Urbano Continues
"Me Voy Enamorando" (Remix) (Chino & Nacho featuring Farruko)	2015	—	—	25	—	18	PROMUSICAE: 2× Platinum	Radio Universo
"Lean On" (J Balvin & Farruko Remix) (Major Lazer featuring MØ, DJ Snake, J Balvin and Farruko)	2015	—	—	2	—	—	PROMUSICAE: 5× Platinum	Non-album singles
"Ella y Yo" (Pepe Quintana featuring Farruko, Tempo, Anuel AA, Almighty and Bryant Myers)	2016	—	—	—	—	34	RIAA: Platinum (Latin)	Non-album singles
"Panda" (Remix) (Almighty featuring Farruko)	2016	—	—	—	—	36		Non-album singles
"Ayer" (Remix) (Anuel AA featuring Farruko)	2016	—	—	—	—	42		Non-album singles
"Encantadora" (Remix) (Yandel featuring Farruko and Zion & Lennox)	2016	—	—	24	—	—	PROMUSICAE: 3× Platinum	Non-album singles
"Hasta Que Se Seque el Malecón" (Remix) (Jacob Forever featuring Farruko)	2016	—	—	10	—	—	PROMUSICAE: 3× Platinum	Invicto
"Si No Te Quiere" (Remix) (Ozuna featuring Arcángel and Farruko)	2016	—	—	—	—	19		Non-album single
"Ella y Yo" (Remix) (Pepe Quintana featuring Farruko, Ozuna, Arcángel, Anuel AA, Bryant Myers, Kevin Roldán, Ñengo Flow, Alexis La Bestia and Ñejo)	2016	—	—	—	—	—	RIAA: Gold (Latin)	Non-album single
"Ya No Me Duele Mas" (Remix) (Silvestre Dangond featuring Farruko)	2016	—	—	—	—	21		Gente Valiente
"Sola" (Remix) (Anuel AA featuring Daddy Yankee, Wisin, Farruko and Zion & Lennox)	2016	—	—	—	—	34	RIAA: 7× Platinum (Latin)	Non-album single
"Te Lo Meto Yo" (Pepe Quintana featuring Bad Bunny, Arcángel, Farruko, Lary Over and Tempo)	2017	—	—	—	—	—	RIAA: Platinum (Latin)	Non-album single
"Ganas Locas" (Prince Royce featuring Farruko)	2017	—	—	—	—	—	RIAA: 3× Platinum (Latin)	Five
"Quiéreme" (Jacob Forever featuring Farruko)	2017	—	—	—	—	31		Non-album single
"Si Me Muero" (Pepe Quintana featuring Farruko, Lary Over, Nengo Flow and Darell)	2017	—	—	—	—	—	RIAA: 3× Platinum (Latin)	Non-album single
"Si Tu Lo Dejas" (Rvssian featuring Bad Bunny, Farruko, Nicky Jam and King Kosa)	2017	—	—	—	—	—	RIAA: 6× Platinum (Latin)	Non-album single
"Mala Mujer" (remix) (C. Tangana featuring Farruko and French Montana)	2017	—	—	5	—	—	PROMUSICAE: 3× Platinum	Non-album single
"Baila Baila Baila" (Remix) (Sech, Daddy Yankee and J Balvin featuring Farruko and Rosalía)	2019	19	—	—	69	3		Non-album single
"Qué Más Pues" (Remix) (Sech, Justin Quiles and Maluma featuring Nicky Jam, Farruko, Dalex and Lenny Tavárez)	2019	—	—	18	—	—	RIAA: 2× Platinum (Latin); PROMUSICAE: Platinum	Sueños
"Mamacita" (Jason Derulo featuring Farruko)	2019	—	—	—	—	—		Non-album single
"DJ No Pare" (Remix) (Justin Quiles featuring Natti Natasha, Farruko, Zion, Dalex and Lenny Tavárez)	2019	17	—	—	—	—		Non-album single
"Bellaquita" (Remix) (Dalex, Lenny Tavárez and Anitta featuring Natti Natasha, Farruko and Justin Quiles)	2019	—	—	26	—	—	AMPROFON: Gold	Modo Avión
"Fantasías" (Remix) (Rauw Alejandro, Anuel AA and Natti Natasha featuring Farruko and Lunay)	2020	—	—	16	—	—	AMPROFON: Platinum+Gold; PROMUSICAE: Platinum	Non-album singles
"Loco" (Remix) (Beéle, Natti Natasha and Manuel Turizo featuring Farruko)	2020	—	—	48	—	—		Non-album singles
"Elegí (Remix)" (Rauw Alejandro, Dalex and Lenny Tavárez featuring Farruko, Anuel AA, Sech, Dímelo Flow and Justin Quiles)	2020	—	—	61	—	—		Afrodisíaco
"Relación" (Remix) (Sech, Daddy Yankee and J Balvin featuring Farruko and Rosalía)	2020	3	1	2	64	2	PROMUSICAE: 3× Platinum	Non-album singles
"Me Pasé" (Enrique Iglesias featuring Farruko)	2021	46	1	74	—	15	PROMUSICAE: Gold	Final (Vol. 1)
"—" denotes items that did not chart or were not released in that territory.

== Other charted and certified songs ==
List of songs, with selected chart positions, showing year released and album name
Title	Year	Peak chart positions				Certifications	Album
Title	Year	ARG	MEX	SPA	US Latin	Certifications	Album
"Su Hija Me Gusta" (featuring Jose Feliciano)	2010	—	—	—	—	RIAA: 2× Platinum (Latin)	El Talento Del Bloque
"Nena Fichu"	2010	—	—	—	—	RIAA: Gold (Latin)	El Talento Del Bloque
"Dime Que Hago"	2012	—	—	—	—	RIAA: Gold (Latin)	TMPR The Most Powerful Rookie
"Salgo" (featuring Arcángel, Ñengo Flow, Kelmitt, D. OzI and Genio)	2014	—	—	—	—	RIAA: Gold (Latin)	Farruko Presents: Los Menores
"Lejos De Aqui"	2014	—	—	22	12	RIAA: 3× Platinum (Latin)	Farruko Presents: Los Menores
"Te Sirvo De Abrigo" (Ivy Queen featuring Farruko)	2015	—	—	—	— (Note: "Te Sirvo De Abrigo" did not enter the Billboard Hot Latin Songs chart, but peaked at No. 23 on the Billboard Top Latin Rhythm Songs chart.)		Vendetta
"Hoy se bebe" (Pitbull featuring Farruko)	2015	—	—	64	—		Dale
"Poder" (Wisin featuring Farruko)	2015	—	—	92	—		Los Vaqueros: La Trilogía
"Adiós" (Alejandra Guzmán featuring Farruko)	2015	—	46	—	—		A + No Poder
"Chillax" (featuring Ky-Mani Marley)	2015	—	25	61	4	RIAA: 6× Platinum (Latin); PROMUSICAE: Gold	Visionary
"Never Let You Go" (featuring Pitbull)	2015	—	—	58	—		Visionary
"Obsesionado"	2015	—	50	56	4	RIAA: 4× Platinum (Latin); PROMUSICAE: Gold	Visionary
"Te Va a Doler"	2015	—	—	94	—		Visionary
"Otra Copa" (Justin Quiles featuring Farruko)	2016	—	—	96	—		La Promesa
"Ojalá" (Wisin & Yandel featuring Farruko)	2018	—	—	—	—	RIAA: Platinum (Latin)	Los Campeones del Pueblo
"Delincuente" (with Anuel AA and Kendo Kaponi)	2019	38	—	24	27	PROMUSICAE: Platinum	Gangalee
"La Cartera" (with Bad Bunny)	2019	72	—	59	25	AMPROFON: Platinum	Gangalee
"Vasito de Agua" (Ricardo Montaner featuring Farruko)	2019	93	47	—	—		Montaner
"Uptown II" (Meek Mill featuring Farruko)	2020	—	—	—	45		Bad Boys for Life
"Que Se Joda" (with Anuel AA and Zion)	2020	—	—	41	32		Emmanuel
"Yapaque" (with Greeicy and Steve Aoki)	2026	—	—	43	—		
"—" denotes items that did not chart or were not released in that territory.

== Guest appearances ==
List of non-single guest appearances, with other performing artists, showing year released and album name
Title	Year	Other artist(s)	Album
"Te Sirvo De Abrigo"	2015	Ivy Queen	Vendetta
"Hoy Se Bebe"	2015	Pitbull	Dale
"Uptown II"	2020	Meek Mill	Bad Boys for Life
"Perfecta"	2022	Luis Fonsi	Ley de Gravedad
"Perfecta" (remix)	2022	Luis Fonsi, Dalex, Juanka	Ley de Gravedad
"Quien Dijo Que No" ft Farruko	2025	Alex Zurdo	Mayday
