= List of Billboard Latin Rhythm Airplay number ones of 2016 =

The Billboard Latin Rhythm Airplay is a chart that ranks the best-performing Spanish-language Latin rhythm singles in the United States. Published by Billboard magazine, the data is compiled by Nielsen SoundScan based collectively on each single's weekly airplay.

== Chart history ==
Key
†	Indicates number 1 on Billboard's year-end Latin rhythm chart

Issue date	Song	Artist	Ref
January 2	"Ginza"	J Balvin	
January 9	"Ginza"	J Balvin	
January 16	"Ginza"	J Balvin	
January 23	"Vaivén"	Daddy Yankee	
January 30	"Encantadora"	Yandel	
February 6	"Encantadora"	Yandel	
February 13	"Encantadora"	Yandel	
February 20	"Ginza"	J Balvin	
February 27	"Encantadora"	Yandel	
March 5	"Ginza"	J Balvin	
March 12	"Hasta el Amanecer" †	Nicky Jam	
March 19	"Hasta el Amanecer" †	Nicky Jam	
March 26	"Hasta el Amanecer" †	Nicky Jam	
April 2	"Hasta el Amanecer" †	Nicky Jam	
April 9	"Hasta el Amanecer" †	Nicky Jam	
April 16	"Hasta el Amanecer" †	Nicky Jam	
April 23	"Obsesionado"	Farruko	
April 30	"Hasta el Amanecer" †	Nicky Jam	
May 7	"Obsesionado"	Farruko	
May 14	"Tan Fácil"	CNCO	
May 21	"Tan Fácil"	CNCO	
May 28	"Hasta el Amanecer" †	Nicky Jam	
June 4	"Bobo"	J Balvin	
June 11	"Bobo"	J Balvin	
June 18	"Bobo"	J Balvin	
June 25	"Bobo"	J Balvin	
July 2	"Bobo"	J Balvin	
July 9	"Bobo"	J Balvin	
July 16	"Bobo"	J Balvin	
July 23	"Bobo"	J Balvin	
July 30	"Bobo"	J Balvin	
August 6	"Bobo"	J Balvin	
August 13	"El Perdedor"	Maluma	
August 20	"Bobo"	J Balvin	
August 27	"Bobo"	J Balvin	
September 3	"Bobo"	J Balvin	
September 10	"Chillax"	Farruko featuring Ky-Mani Marley	
September 17	"Ay Mi Dios"	IAmChino Featuring Pitbull, Yandel, and Chacal	
September 24	"Ay Mi Dios"	IAmChino Featuring Pitbull, Yandel, and Chacal	
October 1	"Chillax"	Farruko featuring Ky-Mani Marley	
October 8	"Chillax"	Farruko featuring Ky-Mani Marley	
October 15	"Chillax"	Farruko featuring Ky-Mani Marley	
October 22	"Chillax"	Farruko featuring Ky-Mani Marley	
October 29	"Safari"	J Balvin featuring Pharrell Williams, Bia and Sky	
November 5	"Otra Vez"	Zion & Lennox featuring J Balvin	
November 12	"Otra Vez"	Zion & Lennox featuring J Balvin	
November 19	"Chantaje"	Shakira featuring Maluma	
November 26	"Chillax"	Farruko featuring Ky-Mani Marley	
December 3	"Chillax"	Farruko featuring Ky-Mani Marley	
December 10	"Nunca Me Olvides"	Yandel	
December 17	"Vacaciones"	Wisin	
December 24	"Te Quiero Pa' Mí"	Don Omar and Zion & Lennox	
December 31	"Vacaciones"	Wisin	
