= List of Billboard Latin Rhythm Airplay number ones of 2014 =

The Billboard Latin Rhythm Airplay is a chart that ranks the best-performing Spanish-language Latin rhythm singles in the United States. Published by Billboard magazine, the data are compiled by Nielsen SoundScan based collectively on each single's weekly airplay.

== Chart history ==
Key
†	Indicates number 1 on Billboard's year-end Latin rhythm chart

Issue date	Song	Artist	Ref
January 4	"Que Viva la Vida"	Wisin	
January 11	"Que Viva la Vida"	Wisin	
January 18	"Que Viva la Vida"	Wisin	
January 25	"Que Viva la Vida"	Wisin	
February 1	"La Nueva y la Ex"	Daddy Yankee	
February 8	"La Nueva y la Ex"	Daddy Yankee	
February 15	"Prometo Olvidarte"	Tony Dize	
February 22	"Hasta Abajo"	Yandel	
March 1	"Hasta Abajo"	Yandel	
March 8	"La Nueva y la Ex"	Daddy Yankee	
March 15	"Adrenalina"	Wisin featuring Ricky Martin and Jennifer Lopez	
March 22	"Adrenalina"	Wisin featuring Ricky Martin and Jennifer Lopez	
March 29	"Adrenalina"	Wisin featuring Ricky Martin and Jennifer Lopez	
April 5	"Adrenalina"	Wisin featuring Ricky Martin and Jennifer Lopez	
April 12	"Adrenalina"	Wisin featuring Ricky Martin and Jennifer Lopez	
April 19	"Adrenalina"	Wisin featuring Ricky Martin and Jennifer Lopez	
April 26	"Adrenalina"	Wisin featuring Ricky Martin and Jennifer Lopez	
May 3	"Adrenalina"	Wisin featuring Ricky Martin and Jennifer Lopez	
May 10	"Adrenalina"	Wisin featuring Ricky Martin and Jennifer Lopez	
May 17	"Adrenalina"	Wisin featuring Ricky Martin and Jennifer Lopez	
May 24	"6 AM" †	J Balvin featuring Farruko	
May 31	"6 AM" †	J Balvin featuring Farruko	
June 7	"Can't Get Enough"	Becky G featuring Pitbull	
June 14	"6 AM" †	J Balvin featuring Farruko	
June 21	"6 AM" †	J Balvin featuring Farruko	
June 28	"Pura Vida"	Don Omar	
July 5	"Pura Vida"	Don Omar	
July 12	"Pura Vida"	Don Omar	
July 19	"6 AM" †	J Balvin featuring Farruko	
July 26	"6 AM" †	J Balvin featuring Farruko	
August 2	"6 AM" †	J Balvin featuring Farruko	
August 9	"6 AM" †	J Balvin featuring Farruko	
August 16	"Passion Whine"	Farruko featuring Sean Paul	
August 23	"6 AM" †	J Balvin featuring Farruko	
August 30	"Passion Whine"	Farruko featuring Sean Paul	
September 6	"Passion Whine"	Farruko featuring Sean Paul	
September 13	"Passion Whine"	Farruko featuring Sean Paul	
September 20	"A Que No Te Atreves"	Tito el Bambino featuring Chencho Corleone	
September 27	"A Que No Te Atreves"	Tito el Bambino featuring Chencho Corleone	
October 4	"A Que No Te Atreves"	Tito el Bambino featuring Chencho Corleone	
October 11	"A Que No Te Atreves"	Tito el Bambino featuring Chencho Corleone	
October 18	"A Que No Te Atreves"	Tito el Bambino featuring Chencho Corleone	
October 25	"Ay Vamos"	J Balvin	
November 1	"Ay Vamos"	J Balvin	
November 8	"Ay Vamos"	J Balvin	
November 15	"Ay Vamos"	J Balvin	
November 22	"Ay Vamos"	J Balvin	
November 29	"Ay Vamos"	J Balvin	
December 6	"Ay Vamos"	J Balvin	
December 13	"Ay Vamos"	J Balvin	
December 20	"Ay Vamos"	J Balvin	
December 27	"Ay Vamos"	J Balvin	
