= Hielo =

2018 single by Daddy Yankee

Single by Daddy Yankee

from the album El Disco Duro
- Language: Spanish
- English title: "Ice"
- Released: May 18, 2018
- Genre: Latin trap
- Length: 3:29
- Label: El Cartel
- Songwriters: Ramón Ayala; Rafael Pina; Juan Rivera
- Producers: Daddy Yankee; Gaby Music

Daddy Yankee singles chronology
"Azukita" (2018)	"Hielo" (2018)	"Made for Now" (2018)

Music video
- "Hielo" on YouTube

"Hielo" (Latin American Spanish: [jelo]; English: "Ice") is a song by Puerto Rican rapper Daddy Yankee. The single was released on May 18, 2018 by El Cartel Records alongside a music video directed by Marlon Peña and filmed at the Hôtel de Glace in Quebec, Canada. The song was written by Daddy Yankee, Rafael Pina and Juan Rivera "Gaby Music", and was produced by Daddy Yankee and Gaby Music. It is a Latin trap song with lyrics about a man made cold and cruel by betrayals and mistrust in past relationships. "Hielo" peaked at number 42 on the US Hot Latin Songs chart.

== Background and release ==
"Hielo" was written by Daddy Yankee, Rafael Pina and Juan Rivera Vázquez "Gaby Music", and was produced by Daddy Yankee and Gaby Music. It was recorded at Pina Records' studio in Caguas, Puerto Rico. "Hielo" was made available for digital download on May 18, 2018 by Daddy Yankee's record label El Cartel Records under exclusive license to Universal Music Latin, three days after its official announcement.

== Composition ==
"Hielo" is a trap song composed in common time (4/4 time) with a length of three minutes and twenty-nine seconds. The lyrics were written from the point of view of a man "hardened by betrayals, mistrust, and lack of love" whose way of assuming relationships changes, becoming a "new, cold and cruel person."

== Reception ==
Writing for Billboard, Suzette Fernandez stated that "The Big Boss is leaving his mark in the genre in his simple and powerful style," highlighting the absence of explicit words, commonly used in trap music. Writing for El País, Javier Marmisa stated that the song is "a musical bet that has worked wonderfully," but at the same time it is "less danceable than other hits like 'Dura', 'Gasolina' and 'Despacito'." Marmisa also opined that the track "feeds that somewhat rancid view that a man has to be cold and hard to conquer a woman."

== Music video ==
=== Background ===
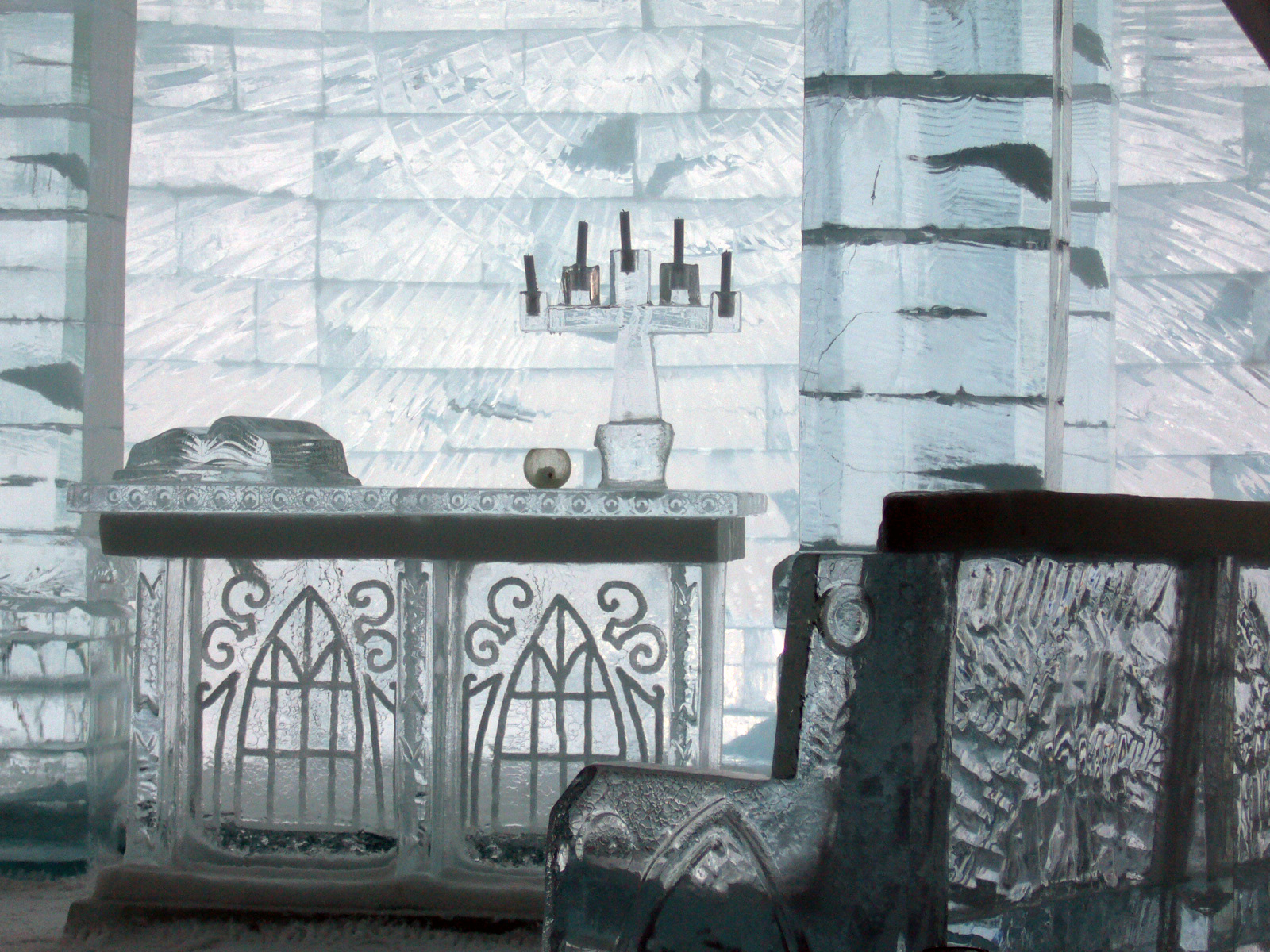
Hôtel de Glace's Chapel in Quebec, Canada, location of some scenes in the music video.

The music video for "Hielo" was directed by Dominican director Marlon Peña, who had previously worked with Daddy Yankee on "Shaky Shaky" (2016). It features Canadian model Valery Morisset. Filming took place during two days in late January 2018 at the Hôtel de Glace in Quebec, Canada. Dresses were designed by Amelie Bebard and JR Martínez. Daddy Yankee wanted to support the song's concept and described his experience at the hotel as "intense," commenting that he had never filmed at a temperature below zero. The visual premiered through Daddy Yankee's YouTube account on May 18, 2018.

=== Synopsis ===
The music video starts in a snowy environment with a man opening a big box, releasing a Siberian Husky who immediately runs through some nearby woods. Meanwhile, Daddy Yankee begins to perform the song at the Hôtel de Glace and a white-dressed woman wanders around a room, putting a crown over her head. She goes down the stairs, takes a bouquet of roses and enters a chapel, where Daddy Yankee is waiting for her at the altar, wearing a black Winter coat. He rejects her and leaves the chapel, and she squeezes the bouquet, cutting her palm of the hand with a hidden dagger. The woman slowly walks away from the altar, throwing the roses to the ground one by one, leaving the last one behind at a snowy path outside. She is later shown sitting on the snow inside a circle made of petals, which turns into blood, and freezes to death. As the video progresses, there are various shots of Daddy Yankee driving a green Lamborghini, as well as performing in front of it and a frozen lake, at an altar, and at a room with four models behind him. The Husky is shown frequently in brief shots throughout the video. The clip ends with the Siberian Husky looking forward over the snow.

=== Reception ===
Javier Marmisa of El País noticed a "visual mix between The Handmaid's Tale and Game of Thrones," and compared Daddy Yankee's outfit with Jon Snow's and "a Fortnite character." He also questioned the model's lack of coat by writing that "it did not cost so much, being at -20 degrees, dressing a little more those who accompany him in the video clip. Buying that Lamborghini leaves you shaking for sure, but a little thermal mall does not come out that expensive."

== Credits and personnel ==
Credits adapted from Tidal.

- Raphy Pina – songwriting
- Gaby Music – songwriting, producer, mixing
- Daddy Yankee – songwriting, producer, vocals

== Charts ==
Chart (2018)	Peak position
Honduras (Monitor Latino)	18
US Hot Latin Songs (Billboard)	42
