= Tourism in Quebec =

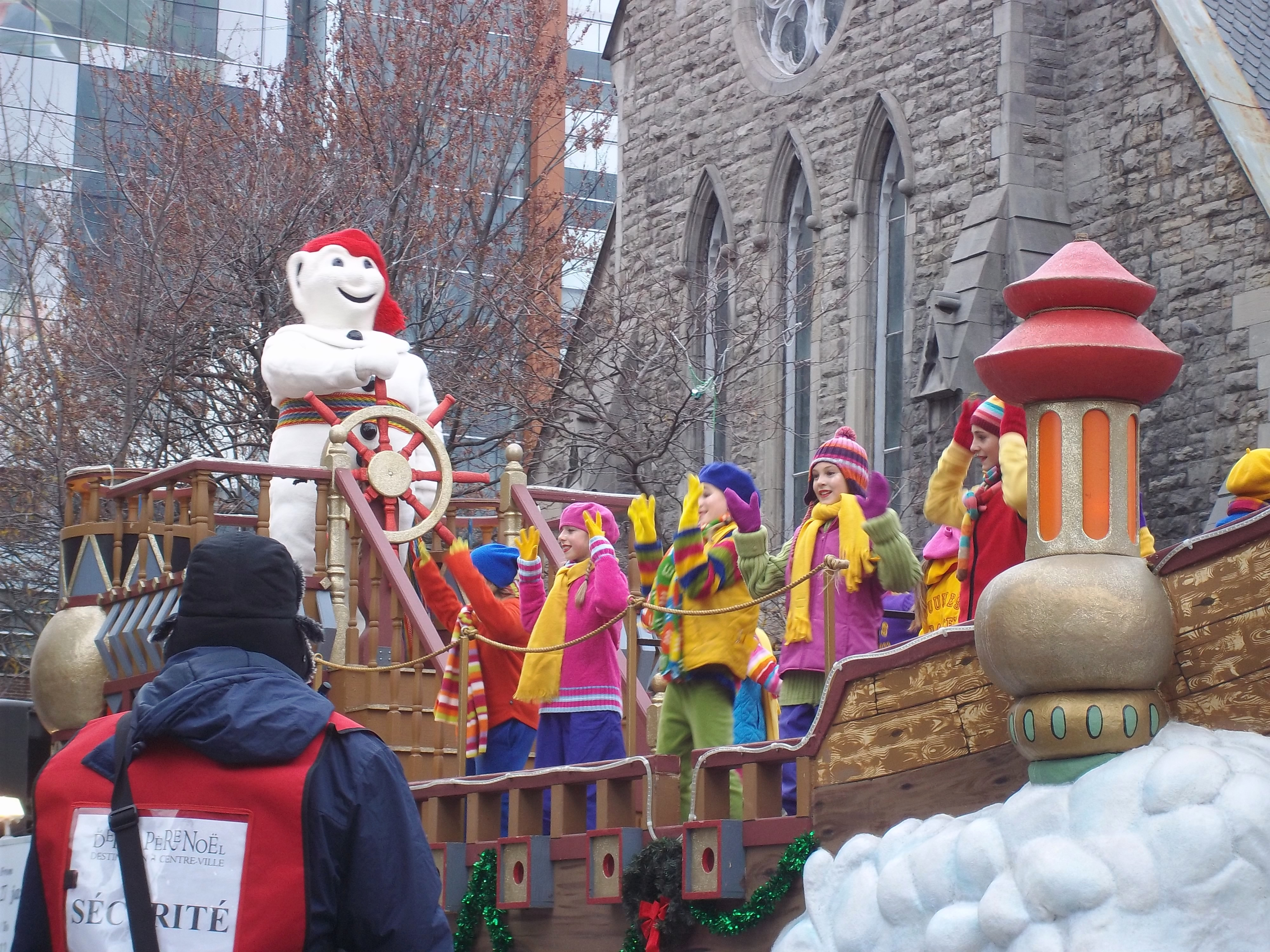
Quebec City's Winter Carnival is one of the world's largest winter festival.

Tourism in Quebec generated over $16 billion in revenue, attracted approximately 62 million visitors, supported 24,000 businesses and employed nearly 407,000 individuals in 2023. Major destinations include the historic Old City of Quebec, the city of Montreal, and natural attractions like Mont-Tremblant National Park and Montmorency Falls. The province attracts millions of visitors with its unique historical sites and a wide range of seasonal activities. Popular attractions include the Chateau Frontenac, Notre-Dame Basilica, Cirque du Soleil and the Ice Hotel.

The province is divided into 21 tourist regions, including Abitibi-Témiscamingue, Bas-Saint-Laurent, Gaspésie, and Montreal. The St. Lawrence River, one of the world's largest rivers and attracts many boaters. The province is home to 27 national parks, the well-known is La Mauricie National Park was established in 1970. Another popular park is Jacques-Cartier National Park. Museums in Quebec also contribute significantly to the province's cultural landscape. The Musée de la civilisation in Quebec City attracts millions of visitors a year. In Montreal, the Montreal Museum of Fine Arts is home to numerous International domestic collections. As of July 2019, there were 198 National Historic Sites designated in Quebec, 30 of which are administered by Parks Canada.

== Location of Quebec ==
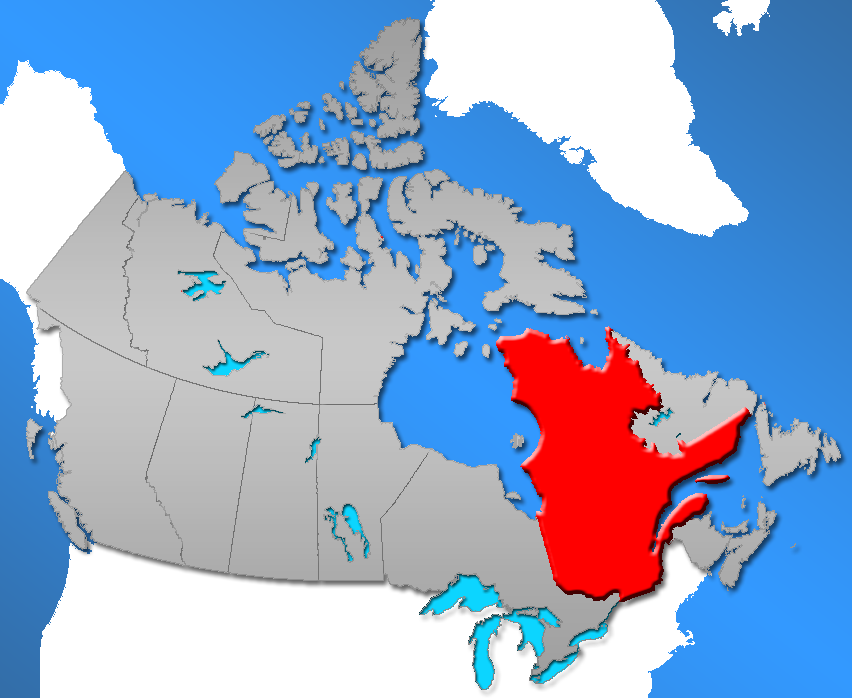
Location of Quebec

Quebec is located in the northeast portion of North America and occupies an area of 1,667,926 km^{2} (643,820 sq. mi.). It is the largest province in Canada with three times as much area as France. It borders on the United States to the south and Ontario to the west. Over 90% of its territory is made up of the Canadian Shield. Most of its population lives in the area surrounding the St. Lawrence River in what is commonly called the St. Lawrence Lowlands. The Appalachian Mountains occupy the southern portion of Quebec.

== Culture and language ==
=== Language ===
Largely French in terms of language and culture, Quebec has preserved its Francophone heritage in the midst of a strong Anglophone culture. French is the mother tongue of 82% of Quebecers, and English is the mother tongue of 10% of the population. The remaining 8% is divided among some 30 languages such as, in order of importance, Italian, Spanish, Arabic, Chinese and Greek. Over 40% of the population is bilingual. In major cities like Montreal, this percentage is as high as 64%, and 16% of the population speaks a third language.

=== Culture ===
Quebecers enjoy dining and celebrating, which is clear from the many festivities that take place in Quebec. They also enjoy literature, the performing arts, painting, sculpture and fine crafts. Quebec talent has made its mark on the world, such as Cirque du Soleil, Céline Dion, and Jacques Villeneuve.

== Tourist regions ==
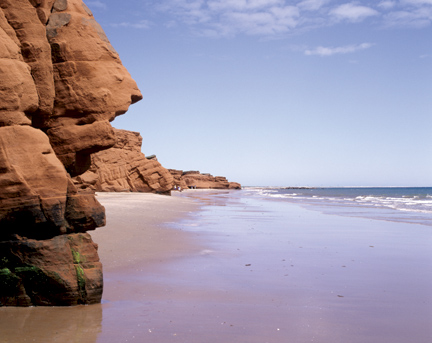
Beach and cliffs of Magdalen Island (Îles-de-la-Madeleine)

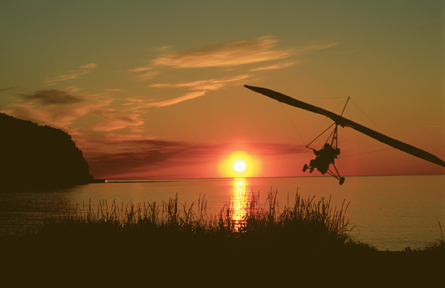
Sunset in Gaspésie

Quebec is made up of 21 tourist regions:

- Abitibi-Témiscamingue
- Baie-James (James Bay)
- Bas-Saint-Laurent
- Centre-du-Québec
- Charlevoix
- Chaudière-Appalaches
- Duplessis
- Eastern Townships
- Gaspésie
- Îles-de-la-Madeleine (Magdalen Island)
- Lanaudière
- Laurentides
- Laval
- Manicouagan
- Mauricie
- Montérégie
- Montréal
- Nunavik
- Outaouais
- Capitale-Nationale
- Saguenay-Lac-Saint-Jean

== Major cities ==
The two largest cities in Quebec are Montreal and Quebec City.

== Four ways to discover Quebec ==
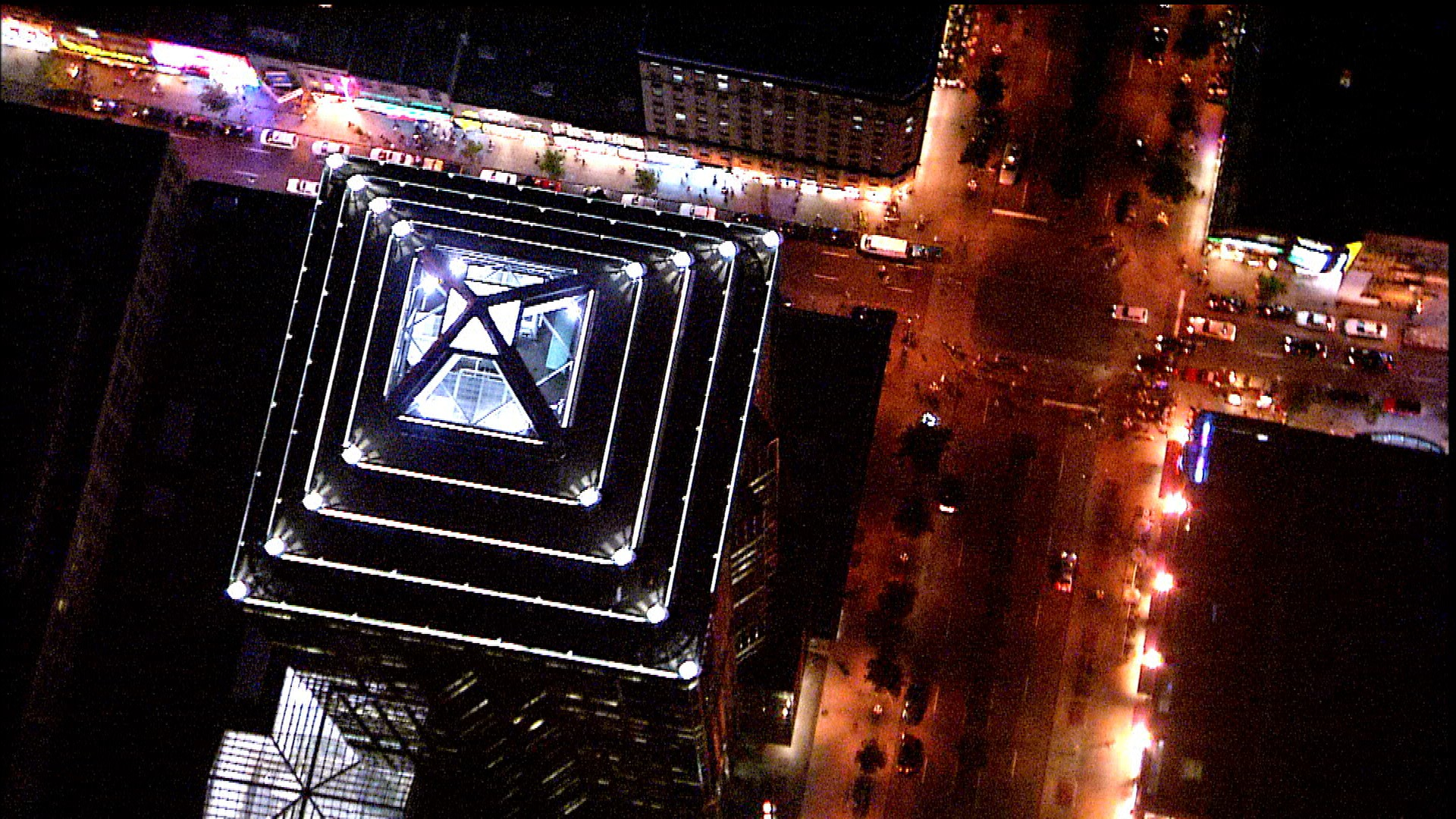
Downtown streets of Montreal, Quebec

Quebec offers four different tourist experiences, each with a wide range of activities.

=== The City Experience ===
==== Montreal ====
The only Francophone metropolis in North America, Montreal is also the second largest Francophone city after Paris in terms of population. This major centre of 4.1 million inhabitants is a tapestry of cultures from the world over with its many neighbourhoods, including Chinatown, the Latin Quarter, the Gay Village, Little Italy, Le Plateau-Mont-Royal, the Quartier International and Old Montreal. Montreal has a rich architectural heritage, along with cultural activities, sports events and festivals. The city is celebrating its 375th anniversary in 2017.

==== Quebec City ====
The capital, Quebec City, is the only fortified city in North America. The oldest Francophone city in North America, Quebec City was named a World Heritage Site by UNESCO in 1985 and celebrated its 400th anniversary in 2008.

=== Resorts ===
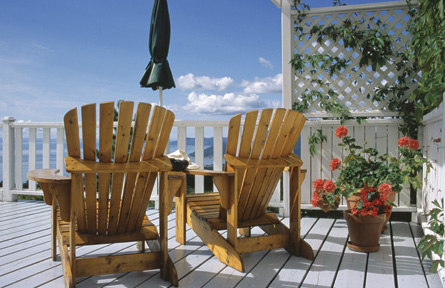
Terrace in la Malbaie, Charlevoix, Quebec

- Château Frontenac
- Clarendon Hotel
- Ice Hotel
- Mont Tremblant Resort: Located in the Laurentides region, Mont-Tremblant Resort is a four-season resort offering activities for the whole family.

=== The St. Lawrence River ===
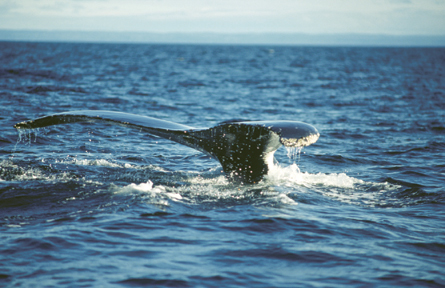
A whale's tail in the St. Lawrence River, Quebec

The St. Lawrence River is one of the largest rivers in the world and historically was the means of access to the centre of North America. Its 1,800 kilometres (1,120 mi.) are lined with coastal villages, bird and marine mammal sanctuaries, lighthouses and verdant and rocky shores. The river is one of the largest navigable waterways in the world, and its estuary is known for its marine mammals, birds and fish.

Upstream from Montreal to the tip of Gaspésie, a road borders the shores of the St. Lawrence River, allowing drivers to explore a coastline that changes from mountainous to rural to wilderness. Visitors can explore the rich Saguenay Fjord.

The 1,600-kilometre (994-mi.) St. Lawrence River transforms into a gulf that is more like an inland sea. The Gulf of St. Lawrence can be travelled by ferry, sailboat, kayak or cruise ship. Whale watching is popular in Quebec, particularly in Tadoussac.

There are also islands and archipelagos scattered along the river. The Île d'Anticosti and the Îles-de-la-Madeleine have legends from sailors and fishermen who continue to live there.

=== Adventures ===
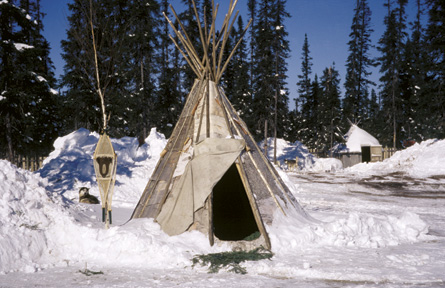
Aboriginal tourism, Baie-James, Quebec

For those who enjoy the outdoors and adventure, Quebec's wide open spaces allow outdoor sports, hunting and fishing:

- Aboriginal peoples: Visitors can discover the traditional way of life of the first inhabitants of the territory, the Aboriginals.
- Protected areas: Quebec has 27 protected national parks,
- Rail trails
- Ski areas and resorts

== What to do ==
=== Sports and outdoors ===
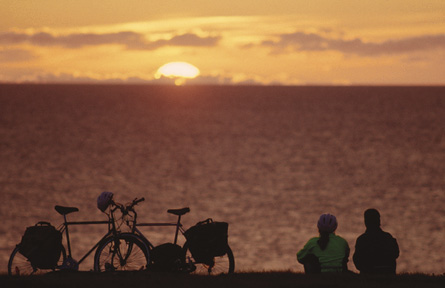
Cyclotourism in Quebec

Sports and outdoor activities in Quebec can be enjoyed summer and winter:

- Hunting and fishing
- Golf
- Snowmobiling
- Wildlife observation
- National parks
- Water sports
- ATV riding
- Hiking
- Skiing
- Dogsledding
- Cycling

=== Sites and attractions ===
- Casinos: Quebec has three casinos: Montreal, Charlevoix and Lac-Leamy.

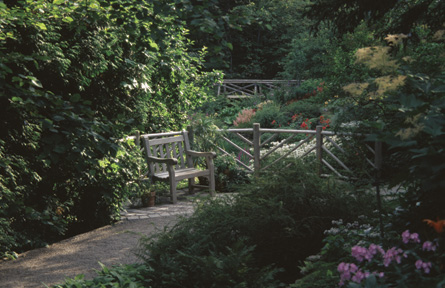
Reford Gardens in Gaspésie, Quebec

- Cruises: Quebec offers cruises for whale watching, travelling the St. Lawrence River or touring the waterways.
- Natural curiosities
- Gardens: the Montreal Botanical Garden, the Insectarium, Reford Gardens and the international garden festival in Gaspésie are among Quebec's garden attractions.
- Museums: Quebec has over 400 museums.
- Theme parks: La Ronde, the Old Port of Montreal and of Quebec City, the Village québécois d’Antan, Granby Zoo, etc.
- Religious heritage: St. Joseph's Oratory, the Basilique Notre-Dame-de-Québec, etc.
- Historical sites: the fortifications of Quebec City, Old Montreal, etc.

=== Tourism routes ===
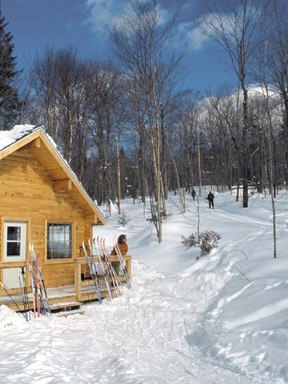
Cross-country skiing in Gaspésie, Parc national du Mont-Tremblant, Laurentians, Quebec

- King's Road (historical 18th-century road connects Quebec City and Montreal)
- New France Route (connecting Quebec City and Cap-Tourmente) - 50 kilometre (30 mile) route
- Whale Route (Manicouagan and Duplessis)
- Navigators’ Route
- Wine Route (Eastern Townships)
- St. Lawrence Route (Charlevoix)
- Border Route (Bas-Saint-Laurent, the borders of New Brunswick and Maine)
- Agricultural tour (Southern Quebec)

=== The four seasons ===
- Summer (end of June to end of September): Summers in Quebec are hot, and the season offers festivals and outdoor activities.
- Fall (end of September to end of December): The leaves change colour in Quebec, creating colourful landscapes.
- Winter (end of December to end of March): Quebec's snowfall makes skiing, snowboarding, tobogganing, snowmobiling and dogsledding possible.
- Spring (end of March to end of June): Nature awakens and Quebec's sugar shacks open their doors.

=== Festivals and events ===
Quebec's events include sports, cultural events and festivals.

=== Cultural events ===
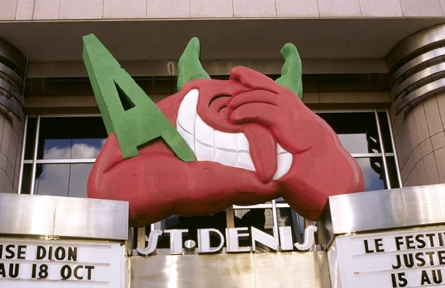
Just For Laughs Festival, Montreal, Quebec

Montreal

- Montreal International Jazz Festival: With over 500 concerts, 350 of them presented free outdoors, the Montreal International Jazz Festival features Canadian and international ambassadors of jazz (end of June to beginning of July).
- Just For Laughs Festival: Montreal's Just For Laughs Festival is the largest comedy festival in the world and attracts over 2 million spectators each year (July).
- Les FrancoFolies de Montréal: The largest Francophone music festival, the Francofolies de Montréal features over 1,000 artists, singing stars, musicians and emerging talent from some 20 countries around the world (end of July to beginning of August).
- Les Concerts Loto-Québec de l'OSM dans les Parcs: These three concerts by the Orchestre Symphonique de Montréal (OSM) are presented in Montreal parks in a family atmosphere (June and July).
- L'International des Feux Loto-Québec: The International des Feux Loto-Québec presented at La Ronde draws the largest pyrotechnics companies from around the world. Each show lasts 30 minutes, and the fireworks competition is the largest in the world (every Wednesday and Saturday evening from the end of June to the end of July).
- International Flora/Le festival de jardins de Montréal: gardens on the festival site (end of June to beginning of September).
- Festival international Nuits d'Afrique: The international-calibre Festival Nuits d'Afrique features music from Africa, the West Indies and the Caribbean, along with workshops, an African market and exotic cuisine (month of July).

Quebec City

- Quebec City Summer Festival: For 40 years, the Quebec City Summer Festival has been presenting hundreds of artists from around the world on ten sites around the capital (beginning of July).
- Loto-Québec International Fireworks Competition: an international musical fireworks competition takes place at the Montmorency Falls (end of July to beginning of August).
- Plein Art Québec: Over 100 craftspeople gather at the Plein Art Québec festival to exhibit Quebec arts and craft creations in ceramics, textile and jewellery (beginning of August).
- SAQ New France Festival: A celebration of the history of the first Europeans to arrive in North America, the New France Festival presents over 1,000 artistic events every year in a journey back to the past in the heart of Old Quebec (beginning of August).

Gatineau

- Gatineau Hot Air Balloon Festival: One of the most popular events in Eastern Canada, the Gatineau Hot Air Balloon Festival features hot air balloons and shows (beginning of September).
- Casino du Lac-Leamy Sound of Light: The Casino du Lac-Leamy Sound of Light is a competition that crowns the champion of the international circuit of musical fireworks competitions over water (end of July to beginning of August).

==== Sports events ====
Montreal

- Rogers Cup: For tennis fans, the Rogers Cup is one of nine Association of Tennis Professionals tournaments on the Masters circuit (beginning of August).
- Presidents Cup: A golf tournament, the Presidents Cup presents the best international players at The Royal Montreal Golf Club (end of September).
- Grand Prix du Canada Festival on Crescent: The Canadian Grand Prix takes place on downtown Montreal's Crescent Street (beginning of June).
- Montreal Bike Fest: cycling activities take place during the Montreal Bike Fest including the Tour de l'île de Montréal , the largest gathering of cyclists in North America (end of May to beginning of June).

== Cuisine ==
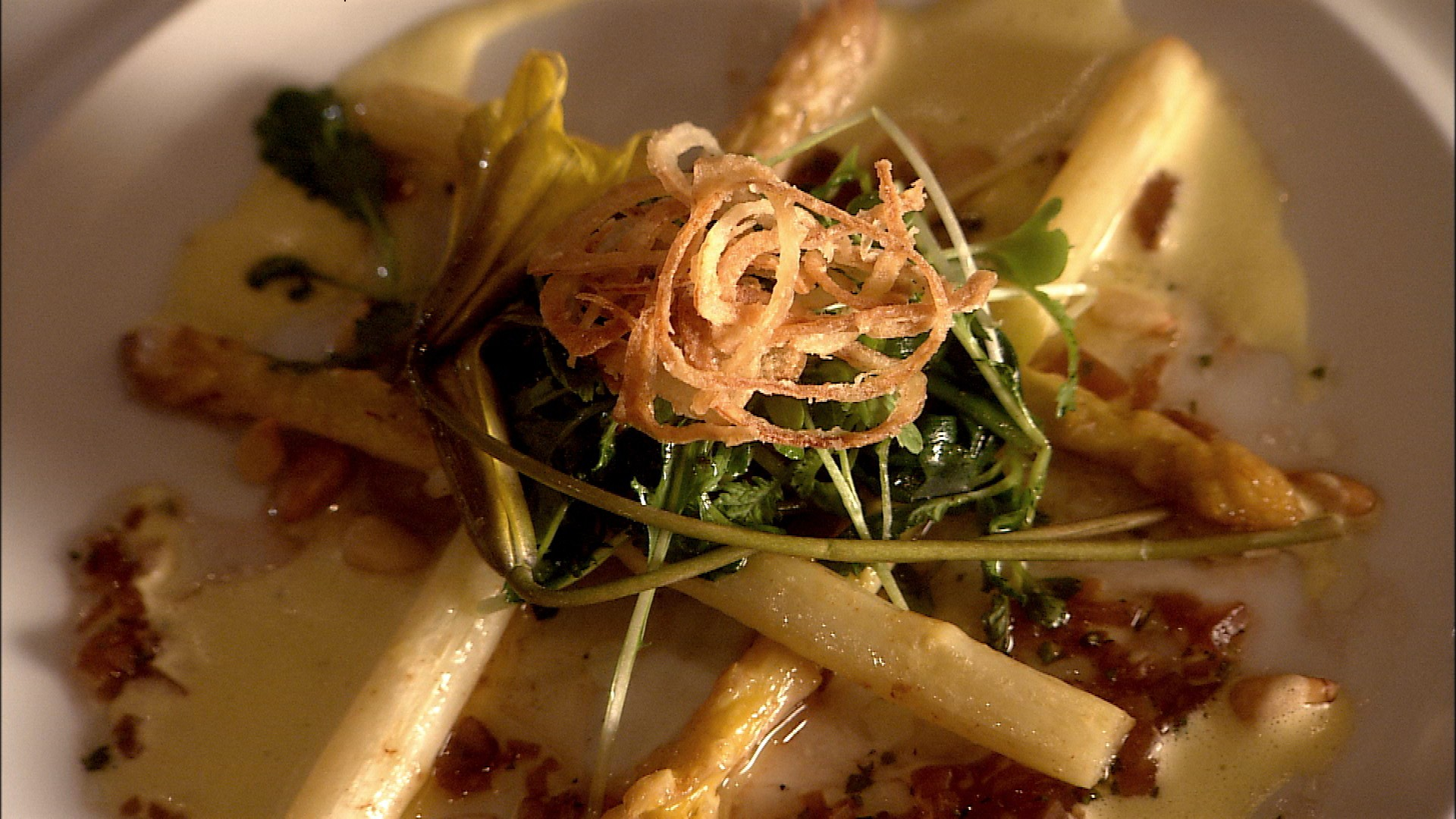
Quebec cuisine

Quebec's cuisine derives its rich flavour from a blend of influences. It has a French culinary base and is enriched by the contribution of the Amerindian peoples and the communities that have made the province their home. Terroir products that grace Quebec tables include ice cider, micro-brewed beer, wine and over 100 varieties of cheese.

Another feature of Quebec is the sugar shack, a family culinary tradition of eating maple products to the rhythms of Quebec folklore (beginning of spring, during March and April).

Others Quebec culinary specialities include: shepherd's pie, poutine, sugar cream pie, pouding chômeur (a sponge cake with a maple syrup sauce), maple syrup, baked beans, tourtière (a meat pie), cretons (a pork spread with onions and spices), etc.

== Transportation ==
Transportation to Quebec includes plane, bus, train and car. There are flights to Quebec from major cities in North America, Europe and Asia. Montreal is a 70-minute flight from New York and is less than 6 hours and 45 minutes by air from London or Paris. Provinces and states that border Quebec are served by rail and road networks. Other means of transportation such as boat and snowmobile can also be used by the more adventurous.

Quebec has a road and air network for travel between cities, using car, bus, plane, train, bicycle on the Route Verte, or by ferry.

== Lodging ==
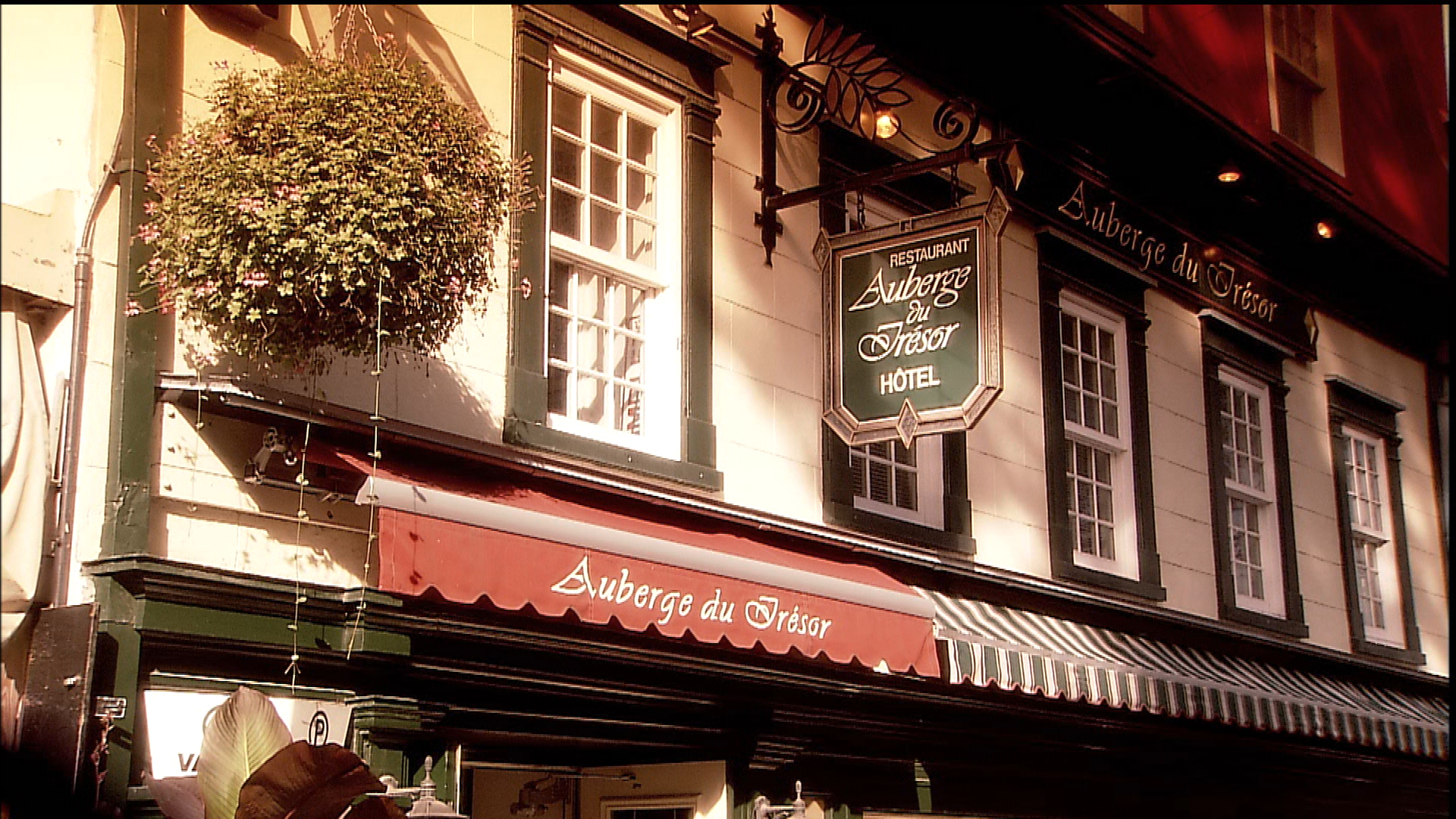
Auberge du Trésor in Quebec City

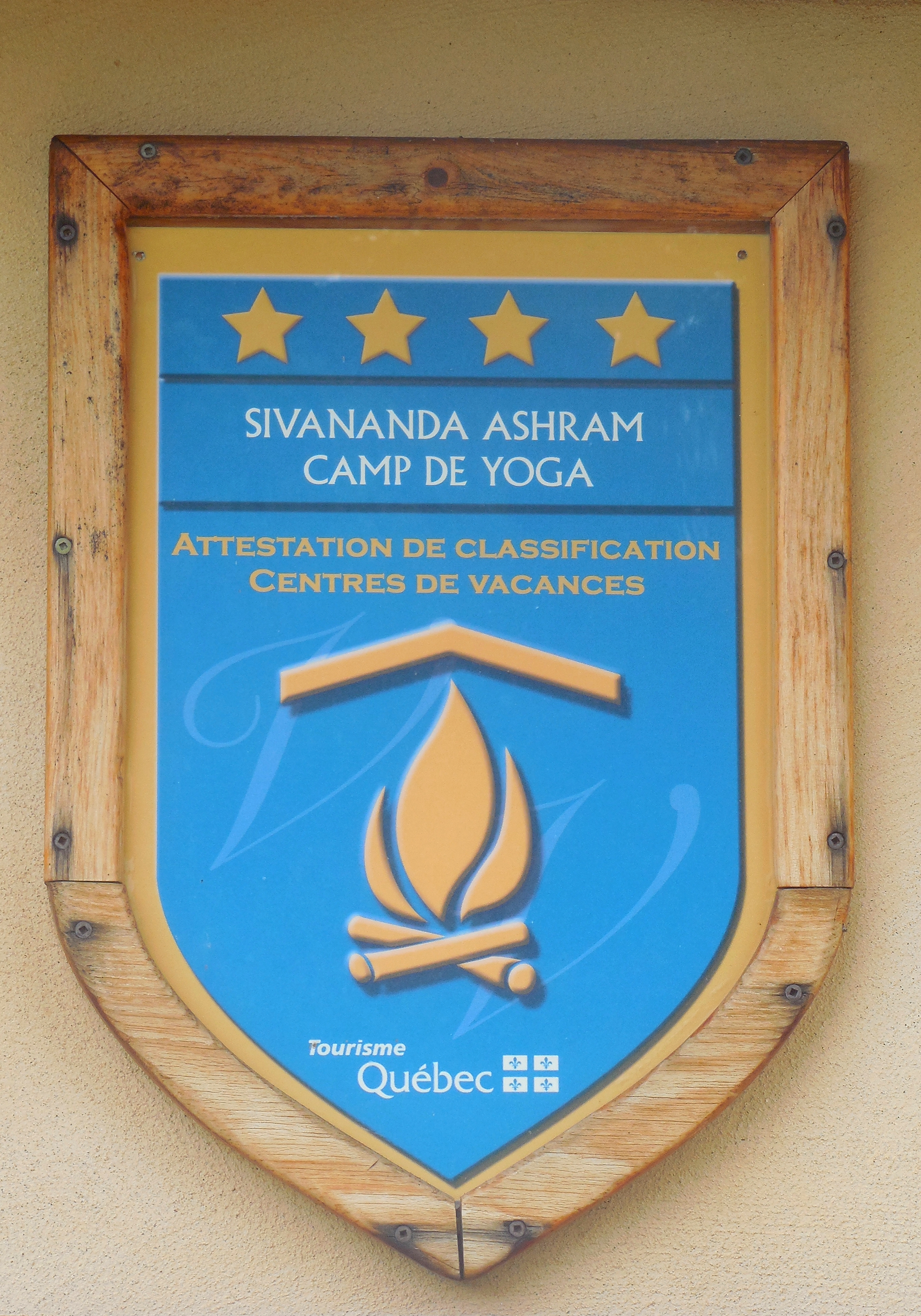
"Holiday Centre" classification certificate signboard

Quebec has 5,800 establishments that hold official lodging certificates, from youth hostels to five-star hotels. Establishments are classified using a stars and sun system. Possibilities include:

- Hotels
- Bed and breakfasts
- Tourist homes
- Wilderness lodges
- Resorts
- Youth hostels
- Educational institutions
- Hospitality villages
- Campgrounds
- Outfitting operations

== See also ==
- Tourism in Canada § Quebec
- Maritime Quebec
