= Blacka Di Danca =

American rapper

- Blacka Di Danca

Background information
- Born: December 16, 1989 (age 36); Brooklyn, New York, U.S.
- Genre: dancehall
- Occupations: choreographer; movement director; dancer; singer; actor; author; philanthropist
- Years active: 2002–present

Blacka Di Danca is an American dancer, choreographer, movement director, singer, and actor. He has performed and taught dancehall workshops internationally.

== Biography ==
Blacka was born in Brooklyn, New York, on December 16, 1989, at St. Mary’s Hospital in Crown Heights. Blacka’s caribbean heritage played an integral role in his early inspiration to dance. He was surrounded by Reggae, Calypso, Soca, and Dancehall music at family and friend gatherings. In 2007, he was booked to perform in Virginia with JC Smoove and Byrd Hype.

=== Dance ===
In 2010, New Kingston began touring with Collie Buddz and Blacka Di Danca in tow. Blacka’s role on the tour was selling merchandise and dancing on stage with New Kingston during their set. After the third show, Blacka officially became a dancer on tour with Collie Buddz. In 2013, Blacka organized his first solo dance workshop tour in Europe, eventually leading to over 16 world tours that took him across the globe. In January 2015, he performed at a New Year's Eve event at Madison Square Garden alongside Diplo and Skrillex. Throughout his career, Blacka also toured with Farruko, Major Lazer, Kreesha Turner, and Mr. Vegas.

In 2010, Blacka officially quit his job as a concierge at Columbia University. In November of the same year, he taught his first dancehall class at the Fashion Institute of Technology (FIT). Two years later, Blacka was regularly teaching classes at the Broadway Dance Center, and throughout New York City.

In 2013, he founded Little Danca, a non-profit children's performing arts organization.

In 2016, Blacka was officially signed to Red Bull as an athlete. Around this time he crossed over into the international music market as a dancer in Rihanna’s Work video. From there he continued choreographing and appearing in videos such as Janet Jackson ft. Daddy Yankee “Made For Now”, Shenseea ft. Tyga “Blessed”, Cardi B ft. El Alfa “Mi Mami”, Nicky Jam and J Balvin “X (Equis)” ASAP Rocky and Juicy J “Multiply,” XXXTentacion “Royalty” and more. He has also choreographed tours for Farruko and Luis Fonsi.

Most recently, Blacka organized drives to benefit victims of the Texas Winter Storm 2021, which provided food and meals for those in need. He has also worked with PETA to distribute healthy meals for his causes and received an award from the organization for his Vegan food outreach.

In 2019, Blacka received a certificate of recognition from New York Senator Kevin S. Parker for his leadership and dedication to teaching dance in the community and a certificate of merit for his achievements from the New York State Assembly.

In May 2020, Blacka moved to California .

=== Music ===
In 2019, Blacka released his first single titled “Bubble Up”. The song inspired thousands of viral dance videos through TikTok and Instagram. Fans from all over the world began submitting their own versions of “Bubble Up” which was included in the song’s official music video. Blacka’s second release titled “Another One” has also gone viral on social media platforms, along with his latest singles “Di Sauce” and “Buss Down”. Similar to his appeal with dancing and entertainment, Blacka’s music has begun to infiltrate and connect with fans all over the globe.

=== Other ventures ===
Blacka is the Founder of Danca, the parent company of Danca Media and Danca Music Group.

He continues to appear on screen in major films such as Yellow Girl and Me and TikTok phenomena such as the recent “Buss Down” challenge, which has over 50 million views. In 2020, “Buss Down” was selected by ESPN Music as one of the main songs for the NBA playoffs and Finals. In 2021, Team Salut, the producers of Afro B’s single “Joanna” teamed up with Blacka to release a “Buss Down” remix on his label titled “I Like That” by Team Salut and Blacka Di Danca.

== Awards ==
Award	Issued by	Year
One Can Make A Difference Award	PETA	2021
Certificate of Recognition	New York State Senate	2019
Certificate of Merit	New York State Assembly	2019
Kidpreneur Awards for Philanthropy	Kids Who Bank	2019
