= Visionary (Farruko album) =

Studio album by Farruko
- Released: October 23, 2015
- Recorded: 2015
- Genre: Reggaeton
- Length: 53:16
- Label: Sony Music Latin
- Producer: Neonazza; Musicólogo & Menes; Andy Clay; Gabriel Rodríguez; Jumbo; Gaby Music; Ladkani; Montana; Franfussion; DJ Luian; Maffio; Sharo Torres; DJ Chino; Frabian Eli; Rvssian; Ez

Farruko chronology
Farruko Presenta: Los Menores (2014)	Visionary (2015)	TrapXFicante (2017)

Singles from Visionary
- 1. "Chapi Chapi" Released: April 28, 2015; 2. "Sunset" Released: June 8, 2015

Visionary is the fourth studio album by Puerto Rican singer Farruko, released on October 23, 2015, through Sony Music Latin. It was produced by Neonazza, Musicólogo & Menes, Andy Clay, Gabriel Rodríguez, Jumbo, Gaby Music, Ladkani, Montana, Franfussion, DJ Luian, Maffio, Sharo Torres, DJ Chino, Frabian Eli, Rvssian and Ez, and features collaborations with Nicky Jam, Messiah and Pitbull, as well as with reggae musicians Shaggy and Ky-Mani Marley.

At the 17th Annual Latin Grammy Awards, the album was nominated for Best Urban Music Album, being Farruko's third nomination in the category.

The album reached the top position on the Top Latin Albums and Latin Rhythm Albums charts, being his second number-one album on both lists. Additionally, it was certified platinum in the United States.

== Background ==
The album was released in 2015 following Farruko signing with Sony Music Latin earlier the same year. He had previously worked with several record labels such as Full Records, Siente Music and El Cartel Records, additionally, Sony Music partnered with Carbon Fiber Music, a label founded by Farruko himself. Prior to the release of Visionary, Farruko released a compilation album titled The Ones under Universal Music Group. To promote the album, Farruko embarked on the Visionary World Tour.

== Singles ==
The first single for the album was "Chapi Chapi", a collaboration with Dominican rapper Messiah, released on April 28, 2015. The second single was "Sunset", featuring Jamaican musician Shaggy and American singer Nicky Jam, released on June 8, 2015, the song peaked at number 3 at the Hot Latin Songs chart. Aside from the singles, the songs "Chillax" and "Obsesionado" also charted on the Hot Latin Songs chart, both peaking at number 4. Additionally, the former peaked at number 16 at the Bubbling Under Hot 100 chart. "Sunset" as well as "Chillax" and "Obsesionado" were certified platinum in United States.

== Track listing ==
NAME track listing
No.	Title	Writer(s)	Producer(s)	Length
1.	"Visionary"	Carlos Efrén Reyes Rosado; Eduardo López; Eliezer García; Freddy Montalvo; Jesús Manuel Benitez-Hiraldo; José Carlos Cruz; Noah K. Assad; Rafael Jiménez	Neonazza; Musicólogo & Menes	4:17
2.	"Fantasy"	Reyes Rosado; López; García; Montalvo; Benitez-Hiraldo; Cruz; Assad; Jiménez	Neonazza; Musicólogo & Menes	3:31
3.	"Obsesionado"	Reyes Rosado; Benitez-Hiraldo; Andy Clay; Gabriel Rodríguez; Gustavo Alberto	Andy Clay; Gabriel Rodríguez	3:31
4.	"Intimidad"	Reyes Rosado; Víctor Viera Moore	Jumbo; Gaby Music	4:02
5.	"HMB" (featuring Messiah)	Reyes Rosado; Benito García; George Michael Ladkani Nieves	Ladkani	3:26
6.	"Papi Champú"	Reyes Rosado; Alberto Lozada; Francisco Collazo Casiano	Montana; Franfussion	4:15
7.	"Back to the Future"	Reyes Rosado; Benitez-Hiraldo; Viera Moore	Jumbo; DJ Luian	4:03
8.	"Chillax" (featuring Ky-Mani Marley)	Reyes Rosado; Ky-Mani Marley; Carlos Maffio Peralta; Marcos G. Pérez; Robert Fernández	Maffio; Sharo Torres	3:17
9.	"Never Let You Go" (featuring Pitbull)	Reyes Rosado; Armando Pérez; Achraf Jannusi; Jimmy Thörnfeldt; Jorge Gomez Martinez; Jose Garcia; Michael Calderon; Novel Jannusi; Bilal Hajji	DJ Chino	3:21
10.	"Illusion"	Reyes Rosado; Viera Moore; Francisco Saldaña	Jumbo; Frabian Eli	3:39
11.	"Te Va a Doler"	Reyes Rosado; Benitez-Hiraldo; Clay; Rodríguez; Alberto	Andy Clay; Gabriel Rodríguez	3:28
12.	"Power"	Reyes Rosado; Lozada; Collazo Casiano	Montana; Franfussion	3:50
13.	"Sunset" (featuring Shaggy and Nicky Jam)	Reyes Rosado; Nick Rivera Caminero; Nikolas David Silvera; Orville Burrell; Tarik Johnston	Rvssian	3:58
14.	"Angels"	Reyes Rosado; G. Pérez; Ezequiel Rivera	Ez; Sharo Torres	4:31
Total length:				53:16

== Charts ==
Weekly chart performance for Visionary
Chart (2015)	Peak position
US Billboard 200	124
US Top Latin Albums (Billboard)	1
US Latin Rhythm Albums (Billboard)	1

== Certifications ==
Certifications for Visionary
Region	Certification	Certified units/sales
Mexico (AMPROFON)	Platinum	60,000^{‡}
United States (RIAA)	Platinum (Latin)	60,000^{‡}
^{‡} Sales+streaming figures based on certification alone.
