= Made for Now =

2018 single by Janet Jackson ft. Daddy Yankee

Single by Janet Jackson and Daddy Yankee
- Language: English; Spanish
- Released: August 17, 2018
- Genre: Pop; Afrobeats
- Length: 3:30
- Label: Rhythm Nation; Cinq
- Songwriters: Janet Jackson; Shawn Butler; Edgar Etienne; Al Sherrod Lambert; Nat Powers; Randy Jackson; Thomas Lumpkins; Harmony Samuels; Varren Wade
- Producer: Harmony Samuels

Janet Jackson singles chronology
"Dammn Baby" (2016)	"Made for Now" (2018)	"Principal" (2025)

Daddy Yankee singles chronology
"Hielo" (2018)	"Made for Now" (2018)	"Como Soy" (2018)

Alternate cover
- Cover for the 12" single

Music video
- "Made for Now" on YouTube

"Made for Now" is a song by American singer-songwriter Janet Jackson and Puerto Rican rapper Daddy Yankee. It was produced by English songwriter, musician and producer Harmony Samuels, with additional production contributions by Jackson's long-term collaborators Jimmy Jam and Terry Lewis alongside Jackson herself. The song was made available for digital download on August 17, 2018, with a Dave Meyers-directed music video released simultaneously. The release marks the first for Jackson's new partnership with independent music publisher and distributor Cinq Music Group to distribute future releases from her independent label Rhythm Nation Records.

In the United States, the single debuted and peaked at number 88 on the Billboard Hot 100 and at number 36 on the Hot R&B/Hip-Hop Songs chart. It also topped the US Dance Club Songs chart, becoming Jackson's 20th number one single and Daddy Yankee's first. "Made for Now" also charted on several international digital component charts. It has been performed live on Jackson's State of the World Tour, The Tonight Show Starring Jimmy Fallon and at the 2018 MTV Europe Music Awards.

== Background and release ==
The project began prior to Janet Jackson starting her State of the World Tour in September 2017. Harmony Samuels has stated that Jackson wanted to record a song about love, unity and "the world coming together" and created a writing camp with her A&R. Drawing on his own Nigerian heritage and past work with Nigerian recording artists, Samuels, and long time American friend Rodney E. Blount thought about making a cultural and Afrocentric song with Latino inspiration and recorded it with Al Sherrod, Shawn Butler, Verren Wade, and Edgar Etienne. After hearing it, Jackson made changes so the song could "fit her" and recorded it with long-time collaborators Jimmy Jam and Terry Lewis, who had produced nine Billboard Hot 100 number-one hit singles with her between 1986 and 2001. As to Daddy Yankee's addition to the track, Harmony Samuels has stated that he thinks he was chosen because of "being Latino, having such a huge fan base over there and being so dope as well." He talked positively about the connection and energy between Jackson and Daddy Yankee, and expressed that "it's just beautiful to bring different cultures together in this time right now."

"Made for Now" was officially announced on August 12, 2018, by Janet Jackson through social media. The collaboration with Daddy Yankee was reported on July 23, 2018, after various images about the filming of the music video were leaked on the Internet and a wardrobe stylist alleged to have worked on the clip. "Made for Now" is Jackson's first single and music video since "Dammn Baby", released in May 2016. On August 16, 2018, Jackson along with her brother and Rhythm Nation business partner Randy Jackson announced that they were partnering with independent music publisher, distributor and label Cinq Music. The latter is known for its work in the Latin music market and would be working with Jackson to distribute "Made for Now" as well as future releases. According to Samuels, it also serves as the lead single for an upcoming EP by Jackson to be released in late 2018. Jackson herself stated: "There's a project that will be in the fall — a little project. This is just the beginning. It's the first single." "Made for Now" was released for digital download on August 17, 2018. The song was promoted through a live performance on American talk show The Tonight Show Starring Jimmy Fallon. Janet Jackson and Daddy Yankee also took part in a public subway ride in New York City, followed by an official release party hosted by Jackson.

== Composition ==
"Made for Now" was described by Rob Arcand of Spin as dancehall-inspired. Sydney Maddison of NPR commented: "Produced by Harmony Samuels and pulling from Afrobeat and reggaeton drums and percussion, Ms. Jackson's link up with Daddy Yankee, one of reggaeton's most famous names, for the occasion proves (once again) she knows how to tap into the cultural innovators." Steven J. Horowitz of Billboard referred to the song as "a pop-leaning bop with a light tropical hue that removes her from the midnight storm R&B of 2015's Unbreakable and brings her back to the dance floor."

== Themes ==
Brooke Marine of W magazine considered Jackson's lyrics to be a message of women's empowerment given the singer's vocal support of the Me Too movement at the 2018 Billboard Music Awards. She stated: "When Jackson sings, 'Don't stop, 'cause I break those ceilings,' she is perhaps referring to the obstacles that women face in the music industry and beyond." In Jackson's own words, "At long last, women have made it clear that we will no longer be controlled, manipulated, or abused" and Marine argued that "it is not out of the realm of possibility that she was inspired to incorporate that message into her latest single." Althea Legaspi of Rolling Stone stated that the "uplifting" message of the song "advocates for enjoying and embracing the present" with lyrics "Living for the moment/ Don't stop/ Celebrate the feeling/ Go up." Alex Robert Ross of Vice's Noisey remarked that the song's positivity "could soundtrack a blockbuster movie about the UN holding a dance-off for world peace." In an interview with iHeartRadio, Jackson stated: "It's love. It's being in the moment, being in the now. I think we think too much about the past or the future, and really enjoying the space that you're in at that moment. [It's] all about love. Love through beats, through rhythm, through music. It's a gift from God; music and love."

== Commercial performance ==
In the United States, the single debuted at number 88 on the Billboard Hot 100 on the week of September 1, 2018, becoming Jackson's 41st entry on the list and Daddy Yankee's 10th, and charted for one week. The song sold 20,000 downloads on its first tracking week, debuting at number eight on the US Digital Songs chart. It also debuted at number nine on Hot R&B Songs and at number 36 on Hot R&B/Hip-Hop Songs, in which Jackson achieved her 50th entry. "Made for Now" peaked at number one on the Dance Club Songs chart on the issue dated October 20, 2018, becoming Jackson's 20th and Daddy Yankee's first number one single. It also became Jackson's 34th and Daddy Yankee's second top ten entry and her first to do so since 2010; only Madonna and Rihanna have attained more top tens on the chart, with 60 and 37, respectively. In Mexico, the single debuted at number 11 on the Top 20 singles chart. The following week, it topped the Top 20 singles chart, achieving an airplay audience of 30.97 million.

== Music video ==
The music video for "Made for Now" was directed by American director Dave Meyers. Filming took place in July 2018 in Brooklyn, New York City, United States. Meyers had previously worked with Janet Jackson on "All for You" (2001), "I Want You" (2004), "Just a Little While" (2004), "No Sleeep" (2015), and "Dammn Baby" (2016). The clip features an array of dancers from Jamaica, Ghana, Nigeria, Grenada, Trinidad, and the United States performing an eclectic mix of African-inspired choreography, which was created by American choreographer Danielle Polanco. Polanco was assisted by American choreographer Amari Marshall and American choreographer Blacka Di Danca on the dancehall section of the music video. Cameroonian fashion designer Claude Lavie served as lead designer for costuming and wardrobe.

== Live performances ==
Janet Jackson and Daddy Yankee performed the song live for the first time on The Tonight Show Starring Jimmy Fallon on August 17, 2018, becoming Jackson's first late-night television appearance in 14 years. After its release, Jackson added the song as the finale on the second leg of the State of the World Tour. Jackson performed the song as part of a medley of her most "iconic hits" during the 2018 MTV Europe Music Awards ceremony, which took place in Bilbao, Spain on November 4, 2018. Jackson received the MTV Europe Music Award for Global Icon during the ceremony. She also included the song on her 2019 Las Vegas Residency, Janet Jackson: Metamorphosis.

== Track listing ==
- Digital download
1. "Made for Now" (with Daddy Yankee) – 3:30
- Ryan Skyy Remix
1. "Made for Now" (Ryan Skyy Extended Remix) – 4:59
2. "Made for Now" (Ryan Skyy Radio Remix) – 3:47
- Eric Kupper Remix
1. "Made for Now" (Eric Kupper Extended Remix) – 7:21
2. "Made for Now" (Eric Kupper Radio Remix) – 3:37
- Benny Benassi & Canova Remix
1. "Made for Now" (Benny Benassi x Canova Remix) – 2:55
- Latin Version
1. "Made for Now (Latin Version) - 3:21
- 12" Single
1. "Made for Now"
2. "Made for Now" (Latin Version)
3. "Made for Now" (Benny Benassi x Canova Remix)
4. "Made for Now" (Ryan Skyy Remix)
5. "Made for Now" (Dirty Werk Remix)
6. "Made for Now" (Eric Kupper Radio Remix)
7. "Made for Now" (Eric Kupper Extended Remix)
8. "Made for Now" (Girls Make Beats Remix)

== Charts ==
Chart (2018)	Peak position
Australia Digital Tracks (ARIA)	40
Canada Hot Digital Songs (Billboard Canada)	29
France Downloads (SNEP)	33
Hungary (Single Top 40)	38
Mexico (Mexico Airplay)	1
Netherlands (Dutch Top 40 Tipparade)	15
Netherlands Digital Song Sales (Billboard)	7
Scotland Singles (OCC)	79
Spain Physical/Digital (PROMUSICAE)	27
UK Singles Downloads (OCC)	47
US Billboard Hot 100	88
US Dance Club Songs (Billboard)	1
US Hot R&B/Hip-Hop Songs (Billboard)	36

=== Year-end charts ===
Chart (2018)	Position
US Adult R&B Songs (Billboard)	43
US Dance Club Songs (Billboard)	47

Chart (2019)	Position
Mexico Anglo (Monitor Latino)	36

== Release history ==
Region	Date	Version	Formats	Label	Ref.
Various	August 17, 2018	Original	Digital download; streaming	Rhythm Nation; Cinq Music	
Italy	August 27, 2018	Original	Contemporary hit radio	Rhythm Nation; Cinq Music	
Italy	September 11, 2018	Eric Kupper Remix	Contemporary hit radio	Rhythm Nation; Cinq Music	
Various	October 12, 2018	Eric Kupper Remix	Digital download; streaming	Rhythm Nation; Cinq Music	
Various	October 26, 2018	Benny Benassi and Canova Remix	Digital download; streaming	Rhythm Nation; Cinq Music	
Various	November 27, 2018	Latin Version	Digital download; streaming	Rhythm Nation; Cinq Music	

== See also ==
- List of number-one songs of 2018 (Mexico)
- List of number-one songs of 2019 (Mexico)
- List of number-one dance singles of 2018 (U.S.)
