= Gangalee =

Studio album by Farruko
- Released: April 26, 2019
- Recorded: 2019
- Length: 81:00
- Label: Sony Music Latin
- Producer: Sharo Towers; DJ Rome; George Noriega; Álex Gárgolas; Rvssian; Dímelo Flow; Jumbo "El Que Produce Solo"; Land Za; O'Neill; Rec808; Frank Miami

Farruko chronology
TrapXFicante (2017)	Gangalee (2019)	En Letra de Otro (2019)

Singles from Gangalee
- 1. "Nadie" Released: January 17, 2019; 2. "Delincuente" Released: July 13, 2019; 3. "La Cartera" Released: September 25, 2019

Gangalee is the sixth studio album by Puerto Rican singer and songwriter Farruko, released on April 26, 2019, through Sony Music Latin. It was produced by Sharo Towers, DJ Rome, George Noriega, Álex Gárgolas, Rvssian, Dímelo Flow, Jumbo "El Que Produce Solo", Land Za, O'Neill, Rec808 and Frank Miami, and features collaborations with Anuel AA, Bad Bunny, J Balvin, Pedro Capó, Alicia Keys, Manuel Turizo, among others.

The album peaked at numbers 2 and 80 at the Top Latin Albums and Billboard 200 charts. It was certified 6× platinum in United States.

== Track listing ==
No.	Title	Length
1.	"La Cartera" (feat. Bad Bunny)	4:49
2.	"GangaXTrip"	2:48
3.	"Boriquen Bella" (feat. Pedro Capó, Justin Quiles & Zion & Lennox)	3:44
4.	"Pórtate Mal"	4:04
5.	"Playa" (feat. Kafu Banton & El Micha)	3:28
6.	"Calma (Alicia Remix)" (feat. Pedro Capó & Alicia Keys)	3:44
7.	"Delincuente" (feat. Anuel AA & Kendo Kaponi)	6:36
8.	"Sorpresa"	3:35
9.	"Tensión" (feat. Zion & Lennox)	3:13
10.	"Resort" (feat. Manuel Turizo)	3:24
11.	"Roatán" (feat. Konshens)	3:41
12.	"Cartier" (feat. Darell & El Micha)	3:45
13.	"Quédate"	3:12
14.	"Mucho Humo" (feat. Bryant Myers & Jo Mersa Marley)	3:39
15.	"Dale Dembow"	3:15
16.	"Deidad"	3:20
17.	"Rompe el Suelo"	3:10
18.	"Coolant (Remix)" (feat. Don Omar)	3:50
19.	"Ponle" (feat. Rvssian & J Balvin)	2:44
20.	"Inolvidable"	3:39
21.	"Nadie"	3:48
22.	"Calma (Remix)" (feat. Pedro Capó)	3:58

== Charts ==
=== Weekly charts ===
Chart (2019)	Peak position
French Albums (SNEP)	96
US Billboard 200	80
US Top Latin Albums (Billboard)	2
US Latin Rhythm Albums (Billboard)	2

=== Year-end charts ===
Chart (2019)	Position
US Top Latin Albums (Billboard)	10
Chart (2020)	Position
US Top Latin Albums (Billboard)	22
Chart (2021)	Position
US Top Latin Albums (Billboard)	37

== Certifications ==
Region	Certification	Certified units/sales
Poland (ZPAV)	Gold	10,000^{‡}
United States (RIAA)	6× Platinum (Latin)	360,000^{‡}
^{‡} Sales+streaming figures based on certification alone.
