= Krippy Kush =

- Remix single cover

Single by Farruko and Bad Bunny featuring Rvssian

from the album TrapXFicante
- Language: Spanish
- English title: "Krippy Kush"
- Released: August 3, 2017
- Genre: Latin trap
- Length: 3:55 (original version); 3:57 (Travis Scott remix); 3:59 (21 Savage remix)
- Label: Sony Latin
- Songwriters: Carlos Reyes; Benito Martínez; Tarik Johnston; Franklin Martínez; Thomas Richard
- Producer: Rvssian

Farruko singles chronology
"Don't Let Go" (2017)	"Krippy Kush" (2017)	"Trapxficante" (2017)

Bad Bunny singles chronology
"Si Tu Lo Dejas" (2017)	"Krippy Kush" (2017)	"Explicale" (2017)

Music video
- "Krippy Kush" on YouTube

"Krippy Kush" is a song by Puerto Rican rappers Farruko and Bad Bunny featuring Jamaican producer Rvssian. It was released by Sony Music Latin on August 3, 2017. The song was written by the two rappers, Rvssian, Franklin Martínez and Thomas Richard. A remix featuring Nicki Minaj and 21 Savage or Travis Scott was released on November 27, 2017.

== Music video ==
The video of "Krippy Kush" was released on August 3, 2017 on Farruko's YouTube channel. As of February 2026, the music video for the song has over 830 million views on YouTube. A video for the remix, featuring Nicki Minaj and Travis Scott, was released on December 22, 2017 and has garnered over 130 million views as of February 2026.

== Charts ==
=== Weekly charts ===
Chart (2017)	Peak position
Colombia (National-Report)	25
El Salvador (Monitor Latino)	15
Puerto Rico (Monitor Latino)	8
Spain (PROMUSICAE)	20
US Billboard Hot 100	75
US Hot Latin Songs (Billboard)	5
US Rhythmic Airplay (Billboard)	16

=== Year-end charts ===
Chart (2017)	Position
US Hot Latin Songs (Billboard)	30
Chart (2018)	Position
US Hot Latin Songs (Billboard)	25

== Certifications ==
Region	Certification	Certified units/sales
Mexico (AMPROFON)	Diamond	300,000^{‡}
Spain (Promusicae)	Platinum	40,000^{‡}
Spain (Promusicae) Remix version	Gold	50,000^{‡}
United States (RIAA)	16× Platinum (Latin)	960,000^{‡}
^{‡} Sales+streaming figures based on certification alone.
