= TrapXFicante =

Studio album by Farruko
- Released: September 15, 2017
- Recorded: 2016–2017
- Genre: Latin trap
- Length: 82:25
- Label: Sony Music Latin
- Producer: Ez el Ezeta; Prida Beats; Christian Adorno; Rvssian; Sharo Towers; Andy Clay; Luis Salazar; Jhon Paul Villasana; Ezequiel Garcia; Jan Paul Pérez; José Carlos Cruz; Fredy Neo; Noah Assad; Rafael Jiménez; George Ladkani; Elijah Sarraga; J Melodiez; Juan Francisco Méndez; Luismer José Pena; Wadiz Ricardo Pena; Los De La Nazza; Tainy; Nítido en el Nintendo

Farruko chronology
Visionary (2015)	TrapXFicante (2017)	Gangalee (2019)

Singles from TrapXFicante
- 1. "Liberace" Released: June 30, 2016; 2. "Don't Let Go" Released: March 16, 2017; 3. "Krippy Kush" Released: August 3, 2017

TrapXFicante is the fifth studio album by Puerto Rican singer Farruko, released on September 15, 2017, through Sony Music Latin. It was produced by Ez el Ezeta, Prida Beats, Christian Adorno, Rvssian, Sharo Towers, Andy Clay, Luis Salazar, Jhon Paul Villasana, Ezequiel Garcia, Jan Paul Pérez, José Carlos Cruz, Fredy Neo, Noah Assad, Rafael Jiménez, George Ladkani, Elijah Sarraga, J Melodiez, Juan Francisco Méndez, Luismer José Pena, Wadiz Ricardo Pena, Tainy and Nítido en el Nintendo, and features collaborations with Bad Bunny, Rvssian, Arcángel, Jacob Forever, Ñengo Flow, Darell, Fetty Wap, Anuel AA and Químico Ultramega.

The album peaked at numbers 3 and 184 at the Top Latin Albums and Billboard 200 charts, respectively. It was certified platinum in United States, being his second album to do so.

== Background ==
The album was first announced in August 2017, following the commercial success of the single "Krippy Kush", the name is a word play meaning "trap dealer", using the words of "trap" and "traficante", the latter meaning dealer in Spanish, it references the genre which the album focuses. The project explores the trap genre after Farruko felt that the genre was under-represented within the Latin music industry as well as the limitations he encountered as a reggaeton artist, he likened the switch to trap as an awakening, saying that "I feel reborn, it's an evolution, reggaeton as a genre limited me as an artist, I felt trapped in a personality".

Throughout the album, Farruko experiments with a variety of genres mainly merging them with trap such as in the Cha-cha-chá-infused "Chá Chá Chá" featuring Cuban singer Jacob Forever, the R&B "Para Acá" and the EDM-inspired "Amanecio" and "Suéltame Tú". To promote the album, Farruko embarked on the TrapXFicante Tour, which started in the United States and later continued through Latin America.

== Singles ==
The first single for the album was "Liberace" featuring Puerto Rican rapper Anuel AA, released on June 30, 2016. The second single was "Don't Let Go", released on March 16, 2017. The third single was "Krippy Kush" featuring Puerto Rican rapper Bad Bunny and record producer Rvssian, released on August 3, 2017. The song peaked at numbers seventy-five and five at the Billboard Hot 100 and Hot Latin Songs charts, respectively, it also charted within the top 20 in El Salvador, Puerto Rico and Spain. "Liberace" was certified gold in United States in 2018 while "Krippy Kush" was certified multi-platinum in the country also in 2018 after selling 960,000 copies.

== Track listing ==
TrapXFicante track listing
No.	Title	Writer(s)	Producer(s)	Length
1.	"TrapXficante"	Carlos Efrén Reyes Rosado; Franklin Martinez; Ezequiel Rivera; Henry De La Prida; Héctor Miguel Hernández Torres	Ez el Ezeta; Prida Beats	3:31
2.	"Llégale"	Reyes Rosado; Martinez; Christian Adorno	Christian Adorno	3:39
3.	"Krippy Kush" (with Bad Bunny featuring Rvssian)	Reyes Rosado; Martinez; Benito Martinez; Tarik Johnston; Thomas Kevin Richard	Rvssian	3:50
4.	"Explícale"	Reyes Rosado; Martinez; Rivera; Marcos G. Pérez; Wander M. Méndez Santos	Ez el Ezeta; Sharo Towers	3:50
5.	"No Confío" (featuring Alexio La Bestia)	Reyes Rosado; Martinez; Pérez; Víctor Aléxis Rivera Rosado	Sharo Towers	4:03
6.	"Te Vas Conmigo"	Reyes Rosado; Martinez; Rivera; Andy Clay; Luis Salazar	Ez el Ezeta; Andy Clay; Luis Salazar	3:11
7.	"Le Falté el Respeto al Dinero" (featuring Arcángel)	Reyes Rosado; Martinez; Rivera; De La Prida; Austin Santos	Ez el Ezeta; Prida Beats	4:08
8.	"Amaneció"	Reyes Rosado; Martinez; Jhon Paul Villasana	Jhon Paul Villasana	3:59
9.	"Chá Chá Chá" (featuring Jacob Forever)	Reyes Rosado; Martinez; Pérez; Villasana; Yosdany Jacob Carmenates	Sharo Towers; Jhon Paul Villasana	3:19
10.	"Para Acá"	Reyes Rosado; Martinez; Ezequiel Garcia; Christopher Michael Villot	Ezequiel Garcia	3:06
11.	"MP5" (featuring Ñengo Flow and Darell)	Reyes Rosado; Martinez; Rivera; Prida; Edwin Rosa Vázquez; Jan Paul Pérez Morales; Vladimir A. Natera Abreu	Eze el Ezeta; Prida Beats; Jan Paul Pérez	3:30
12.	"Spectrum"	Reyes Rosado; Martinez; Freddy Montalvo; José Carlos Cruz; Noah K. Assad; Rafael R. Jiménez	José Carlos Cruz; Fredy Neo; Noah Assad; Rafael Jiménez	4:20
13.	"Losing Control" (featuring Fetty Wap)	Reyes Rosado; Martinez; Andrés Jese Gavillán; George M. Ladkani Nieves; Willie Maxwell	George Ladkani	3:33
14.	"Llama Bebé"	Reyes Rosado; Martinez; Rivera; Prida	Eze el Ezeta; Prida Beats	3:43
15.	"Oscuridad" (featuring Anuel AA)	Reyes Rosado; Martinez; Elijah Sarraga; Emmanuel Gazmey	Elijah Sarraga	4:00
16.	"Lunes-Viernes"	Reyes Rosado; Martinez; Blenfer Almonte; Jaysson Pena; Johan José Francisco; Juan Francisco Méndez; Luismer José Pena Madera; Wadiz Ricardo Pena	J Melodiez; Juan Francisco Méndez; Luismer José Pena; Wadiz Ricardo Pena	3:39
17.	"Suéltate Tú"	Reyes Rosado; Martinez; Pérez; Villasana; Eduardo Vargas; Eliezer Palacios; Francisco Saldaña; Marco Masis	Tainy; Sharo Towers; Jhon Paul Villasana	3:55
18.	"Yeah Baby"	Reyes Rosado; Martinez; Johnston; Richard	Rvssian	4:13
19.	"Kilo Kilo" (featuring Químico Ultramega)	Reyes Rosado; Martinez; Jesús Alberto Jiménez Marte; Ramón Estix Taveras Mejía	Nítido en el Nintendo	3:54
20.	"Me Cansé"	Reyes Rosado; Martinez; Villasana	Jhon Paul Villasana	3:24
21.	"Mi Forma de Ser"	Reyes Rosado; Martinez; Pérez	Sharo Towers	3:34
22.	"Don't Let Go"	Reyes Rosado; Martinez; Eduardo López; Montalvo; Cruz; Assad; Jiménez; Eliezer García	José Carlos Cruz; Fredy Neo; Noah Assad; Rafael Jiménez	4:04
Total length:				82:25

== Charts ==
Weekly chart performance for TrapXFicante
Chart (2017)	Peak position
US Billboard 200	184
US Top Latin Albums (Billboard)	3
US Latin Rhythm Albums (Billboard)	2

== Certifications ==
Certifications for TrapXFicante
Region	Certification	Certified units/sales
Mexico (AMPROFON)	Gold	30,000^{‡}
United States (RIAA)	Platinum (Latin)	60,000^{‡}
^{‡} Sales+streaming figures based on certification alone.
