= Rvssian =

Jamaican record producer (born 1992)

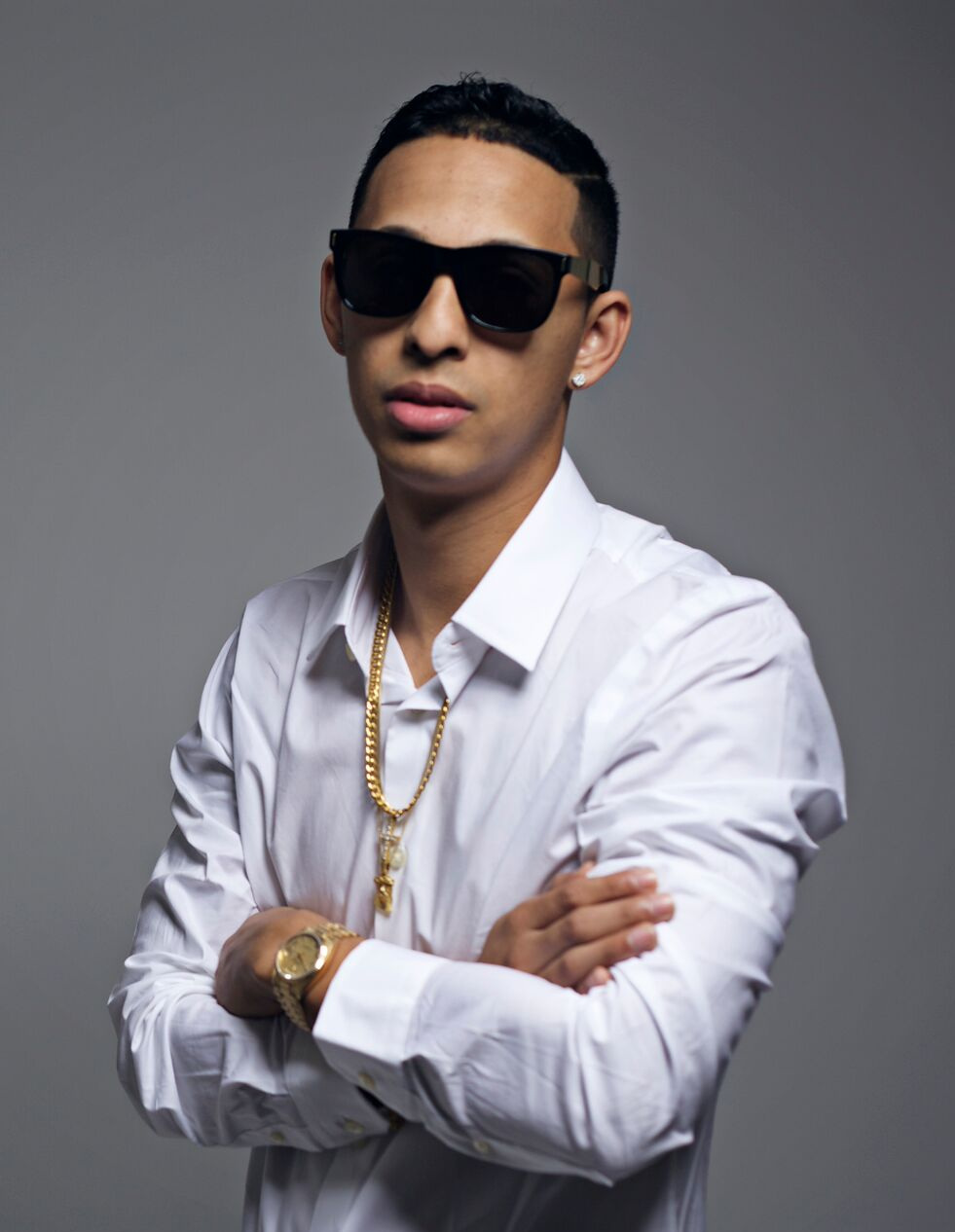
- Rvssian in 2015

Background information
- Also known as: Russian
- Born: Tarik Johnston; 12 April 1988 (age 38)
- Genres: Latin trap; dancehall; R&B
- Occupations: Record producer; singer; songwriter; entrepreneur
- Instruments: Piano; drums; guitar; vocals
- Years active: 2007–present
- Label: Head Concussion

Tarik Johnston (born 12 April 1988), commonly known as Rvssian and previously as Russian (stylized in all caps), is a Jamaican record producer, singer, and entrepreneur. He is the founder of Head Concussion, a music production company situated in Kingston, Jamaica.

He rose to popularity shortly after producing Vybz Kartel's "Life Sweet" in 2010. He produced for other artists including Konshens and J Capri, Sean Paul and Farruko. The Sean Paul and Farruko single was certified platinum by the Recording Industry Association of America (RIAA) on October 3, 2014.

== Early life and education ==
Tarik 'Rvssian' Johnston, is from the wealthy upper class Johnston Family which has stake in Jamaica Producers Group Limited (known for its St. Mary's Banana Chips), Seaboard Freight & Shipping Co. Limited and T.S. Crane Services.

Rvssian learned to play the piano and drums from his father Michael 'Micron' Johnston, the founder of Micron Music Limited. In December 2007, Rvssian founded Head Concussion Records, a music production studio located in Kingston, Jamaica.

Johnston initially attended Ardenne High School but was expelled prior to completion. He subsequently transferred to Covenant Christian Academy, a private co-educational institution in Kingston, where he completed his secondary education. Following his graduation from Covenant Christian Academy, Johnston enrolled at the Edna Manley College of the Visual and Performing Arts to pursue tertiary music studies. It was during this period that he met Vybz Kartel through fellow producers Jordan McClure (Chimney Records) and Stephen 'Di Genius' McGregor. In 2008, Rvssian created his first rhythm "Liberty Riddim", which featured Konshens' "Ago Kill Me" and Vybz Kartel's "Nah Hold We Down".

Two years later, Rvssian produced "Life Sweet" for Vybz Kartel. To develop his music career further, Rvssian decided to leave the Edna Manley College for Visual and Performing Arts.

== Career ==
In 2010, Rvssian and Vybz Kartel teamed up on the single "Straight Jeans and Fitted." The song received over 25 million views on YouTube and went on to win "Favorite Music Collaboration" in the February 2011 Youth View Awards. In 2010, rumors of a dispute between Rvssian and Vybz Kartel surfaced but the two artists were quick to dispel the reports.

The duo also worked together on "Get Gyal Anywhere", "Cure Fi Badmind", "Look Pon We" and "New Jordans" (feat. Rvssian). The latter was released in 2014 and was recorded before Vybz Kartel went to prison for a murder conviction.

The two have since continued to work together and Rvssian has released a series of singles by Vybz Kartel including "Ever Blessed", "Kremlin", "Hi" and "Mamacita" (featuring J Capri), all released after Kartel's incarceration.

Shortly after forming Head Concussion Records in December 2007, Rvssian released a number of songs, working with dancehall acts like Demarco, Tarrus Riley and Blak Ryno. He released Kartel's hit single "Life Sweet", which was followed by dancehall rhythms such as "Go Go Club", "Remedy" and "Nuh Fear". These rhythms became hits, with the "Go Go Club" rhythm introducing new artistes like Merital Family to the musical scene.

Under his label Head Concussion Records, Rvssian went on to release Tarrus Riley's hit single "Good Girl, Gone Bad" which featured Konshens, Vybz Kartel's "Lyricist" and Chan Dizzy's "Nuh Strange Face."

After the arrest and conviction of Vybz Kartel, Rvssian, whose career growth had been attributed to working with the "Dancehall Hero", kept Head Concussion Records on the global map, launching J Capri, a new female dancehall artiste. The platinum-selling producer released "Pull Up To Mi Bumper" (featuring Konshens and J Capri), "Whine 'n' Kotch" (featuring J Capri and Charly Black), "Reverse It" and "Boom 'n" Bend Over" by J Capri. J Capri's "Pull Up To Mi Bumper" and "Whine 'n' Kotch" received over 25 and 50 million YouTube views, respectively.

== Awards and recognition ==
At the Youth View Awards in February 2011, Rvssian won the award for Favorite Local Music Video for the Year alongside Vybz Kartel for their hit single "Straight Jeans and Fitted". Rvssian also won Favorite Producer at the 2015 YVA Awards.

In 2014, Rvssian won a platinum plaque for his reggaeton single "Passion Whine". He was also recognized at the 21st Digital Awards for his musical contributions.

In 2022, Rvssian was nominated for crossover artist of the year at the 2022 Billboard Latin Music Awards.

== Discography ==
=== Extended plays ===
List of extended plays
Title	EP details
Italiano (with Sfera Ebbasta)	Released: 5 May 2022; Labels: Universal Italia; Format: Digital download, streaming

=== Singles ===
==== As lead artist ====
List of singles as lead artist, with selected chart positions
Title	Year	Peak chart positions					Certifications	Album
Title	Year	US	US Latin	ARG	ITA	SPA	Certifications	Album
"Privado" (featuring Nicky Jam, Farruko, Arcángel and Konshens)	2016	—	—	—	—	—	RIAA: 3× Platinum (Latin)	Non-album singles
"Si Tu Lo Dejas" (featuring Bad Bunny, Farruko, Nicky Jam and Kosa)	2017	—	—	—	—	—	RIAA: 6× Platinum (Latin); PROMUSICAE: Gold	Non-album singles
"Pablo" (with Sfera Ebbasta)	2018	—	—	—	1	—	FIMI: 3× Platinum+Gold	Non-album singles
"Ponle" (with Farruko and J Balvin)	2018	—	23	—	—	74	AMPROFON: 3× Platinum+Gold; PROMUSICAE: Platinum	Non-album singles
"B11" (with Darell and Zion & Lennox featuring Myke Towers)	2018	—	40	—	—	29	PROMUSICAE: 2× Platinum	Non-album singles
"No Me Ame" (with Anuel AA and Juice Wrld)	2020	—	15	—	—	25		Non-album singles
"Nostálgico" (with Rauw Alejandro and Chris Brown)	2021	—	8	48	—	3	AMPROFON: 2× Platinum; RIAA: 5× Platinum (Latin); PROMUSICAE: 4× Platinum	Non-album singles
"Italiano Anthem" (with Sfera Ebbasta)	2022	—	—	—	2	—	FIMI: Platinum	Italiano
"Mamma Mia" (with Sfera Ebbasta)	2022	—	—	—	2	—	FIMI: 3× Platinum	Italiano
"Santa" (with Rauw Alejandro and Ayra Starr)	2024	— (Note: "Santa" did not enter the Billboard Hot 100, but peaked at number 5 on the Bubbling Under Hot 100 chart.)	8	15	46	1	AMPROFON: Platinum+Gold; FIMI: Gold; PROMUSICAE: 3× Platinum	The Year I Turned 21
"Chief Keef" (with Sfera Ebbasta and Skillibeng)	2026	—	—	—	45	—		Non-album single

==== As featured artist ====
List of singles as featured artist, with selected chart positions
Title	Year	Peak chart positions					Certifications	Album
Title	Year	US	US Latin	SPA	NIG	UK Sales	Certifications	Album
"Krippy Kush" (Farruko and Bad Bunny featuring Rvssian or remix with Nicki Minaj featuring 21 Savage or Travis Scott)	2017	75	5	20	—	—	AMPROFON: 4× Platinum; RIAA: 16× Platinum (Latin); PROMUSICAE: Platinum	TrapXFicante
"Writing on the Wall" (French Montana featuring Post Malone, Cardi B and Rvssian)	2019	56	—	—	—	—	RIAA: Gold (Latin)	Montana
"Friends" (Leigh-Anne featuring Rvssian)	2025	—	—	—	—	—		My Ego Told Me To
"Most Wanted" (Leigh-Anne featuring Valiant and Rvssian)	2026	—	—	—	86	66		My Ego Told Me To

=== Other songs ===
List of other songs, with selected chart positions
Title	Year	Peak chart positions		Certifications	Album
Title	Year	ARG	ITA	Certifications	Album
"X6" (with Sferra Ebbasta featuring Bia)	2022	—	17		Italiano
"Easy" (with Sferra Ebbasta featuring Fivio Foreign)	2022	—	5	FIMI: Gold	Italiano
"Sola" (with Sferra Ebbasta featuring Myke Towers)	2022	—	20		Italiano
"Sex & Love" (with Tiago PZK)	2022	44	—		Portales
"Soli" (Shiva featuring Tiago PZK and Rvssian)	2023	—	80		Santana Season
