= Farruko Presenta: Los Menores =

Studio album by Farruko
- Released: 27 October 2014
- Recorded: 2014
- Genres: Reggaeton; Latin hip hop
- Labels: Carbon Fiber; Siente; Universal Latino
- Producers: DJ Luian; Noize "El Nuevo Sonido"; Benny Benni

Farruko chronology
Imperio Nazza: Farruko Edition (2013)	Farruko Presenta: Los Menores (2014)	Visionary (2015)

Singles from Farruko Presenta: Los Menores
- 1. "Passion Whine" Released: 2 March 2014; 2. "La Nueva Gerencia" Released: 14 June 2014; 3. "Salgo" Released: 7 October 2014; 4. "Lejos de Aqui" Released: 26 October 2014

Farruko Presenta: Los Menores is the third studio album by Puerto Rican singer Farruko. It was released on 27 October 2014, by Carbon Fiber Music, Siente Music and Universal Music Latino.

== Track listing ==
Standard edition
No.	Title	Length
1.	"Salgo (Intro)" (featuring Arcángel, Ñengo Flow, D. Ozi, Genio and Kelmitt)	5:25
2.	"Recordarte" (featuring De La Ghetto)	3:39
3.	"Lejos de Aqui"	3:41
4.	"Estás Pa Mí"	3:18
5.	"Pa' Darle" (featuring Ñengo Flow)	3:35
6.	"Menor" (featuring D. Ozi)	4:15
7.	"Miro el Reloj" (featuring. J Álvarez and Jory)	5:00
8.	"Si No Te Tengo" (featuring Tony Dize)	4:12
9.	"No Soy" (featuring Nicky Jam)	3:28
10.	"No Quiere Saber" (featuring Zion & Lennox)	3:49
11.	"Interesada" (featuring Luigi 21 +)	3:42
12.	"Bebe Conmigo" (featuring J Balvin)	3:34
13.	"Prófugo" (Kelmitt featuring D. Ozi)	3:42
14.	"Passion Whine" (featuring Sean Paul)	3:33
15.	"Así Crecí"	3:24

Target bonus tracks
No.	Title	Length
16.	"Passion Whine" (remix featuring Sean Paul and Wisin)	4:20
17.	"La Nueva Gerencia" (featuring Arcángel)	4:29

== Charts ==
=== Weekly charts ===
Weekly chart performance for Farruko Presenta: Los Menores
Chart (2014)	Peak position
US Billboard 200	90
US Top Latin Albums (Billboard)	1
US Latin Rhythm Albums (Billboard)	1
US Top Rap Albums (Billboard)	12

=== Year-end charts ===
Year-end chart performance for Farruko Presenta: Los Menores
Chart (2015)	Position
US Top Latin Albums (Billboard)	41
