= Ice Hotel (Quebec) =

In Saint-Gabriel-de-Valcartier, Quebec, Canada

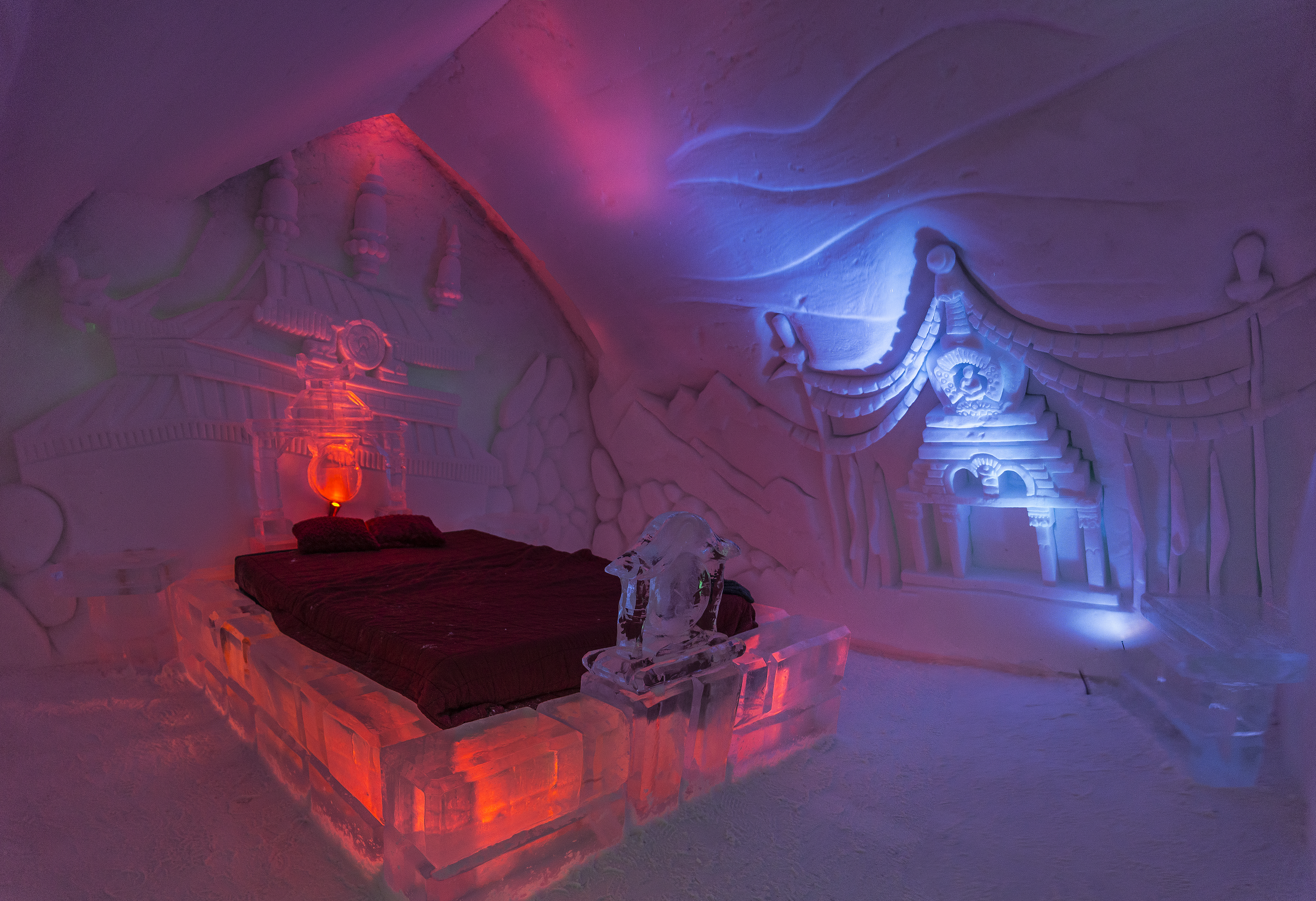

General information
- Location: Saint-Gabriel-de-Valcartier, Quebec, Canada
- Coordinates: 46.943966°N 71.475037°W
- Opening: January 1, 2001

Technical details
- Floor count: 1

Other information
- Number of rooms: 44
- Parking: Yes

Website
- hoteldeglace-canada.com

The Ice Hotel (French: Hôtel de Glace) in Saint-Gabriel-de-Valcartier, Quebec, Canada is the oldest ice hotel in North America.

== History ==
The Ice Hotel opened on New Year's Day in 2001. It was the first ice hotel in North America, and the only one until 2012.

For its first year, it was located in Montmorency Falls Park, on the outskirts of Quebec City. In 2002, it moved to the nearby Duchesnay resort in Sainte-Catherine-de-la-Jacques-Cartier, where it stayed until 2010. In 2011, the Hôtel de Glace moved to a new site, in the Charlesbourg neighbourhood of Quebec City, 5 km north of downtown Quebec City on the first slopes of the Laurentian Mountains. In 2017, the hotel moved to its current home at the Valcartier Vacation Village, a large family resort in Saint-Gabriel-de-Valcartier that also has a large indoor water park, winter tube slides, and an outdoor water park in the summer.

The hotel is built each December for a season that lasts from early January through April. It had 11 double beds when it first opened in 2001. It has now 51 double beds, all made of ice and followed by a solid wood base and comfortable mattress. When the time comes, a cozy sleeping bag, an isolating bed sheet and a pillow are delivered to the rooms. Only the bathrooms are heated and located in a separate insulated structure.

It takes about a month and a half to build with 50 workers. The hotel makes its own snow using a special mixture to adjust the humidity. It is built with metal frames, it is allowed to harden for a few days, and then the frames are removed. The hotel is made of 30,000 tons of snow and 500 tons of ice and the walls are up to four feet thick.

== Description ==
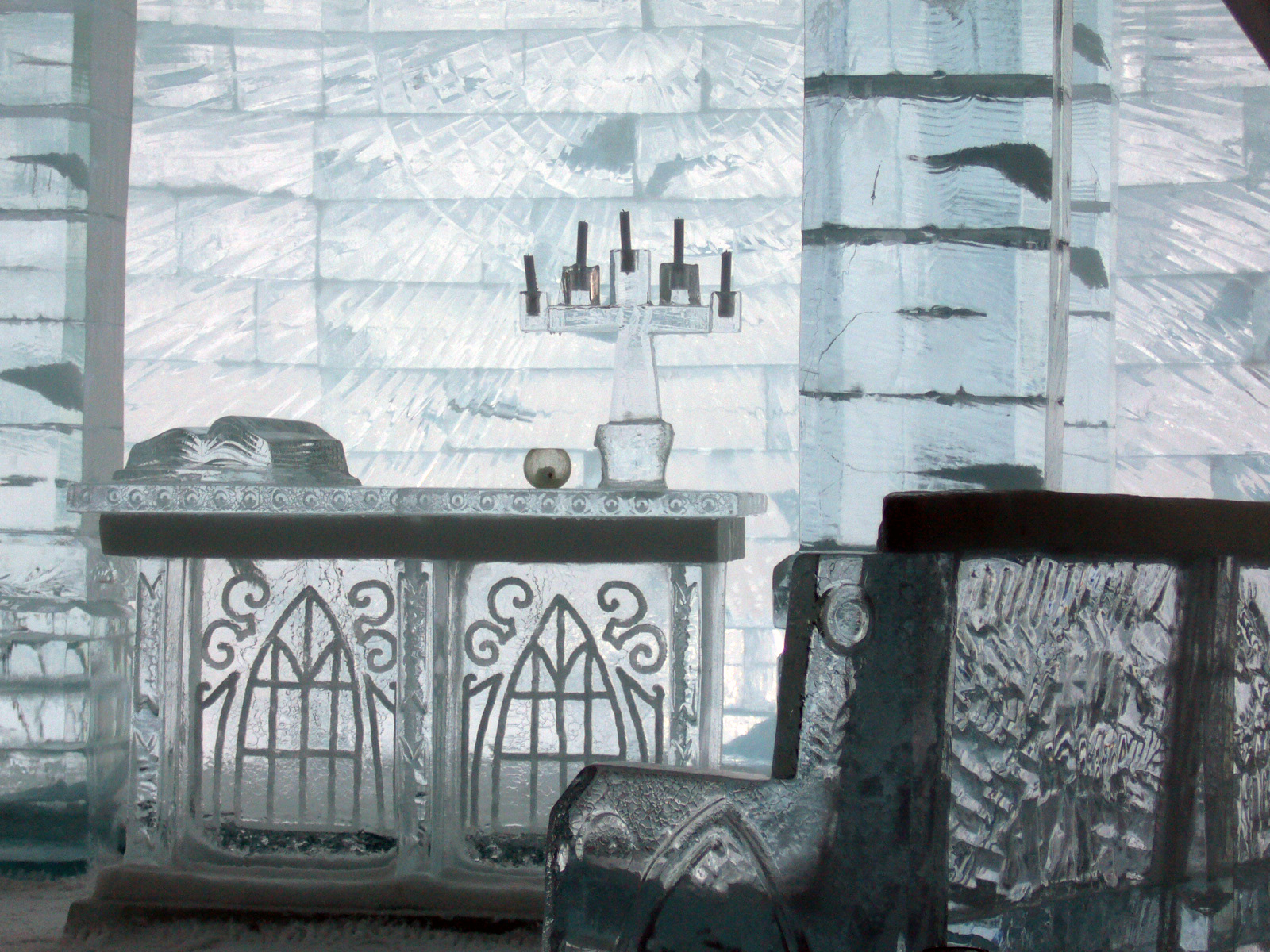
Ice Hotel Chapel, Quebec (February, 2006)

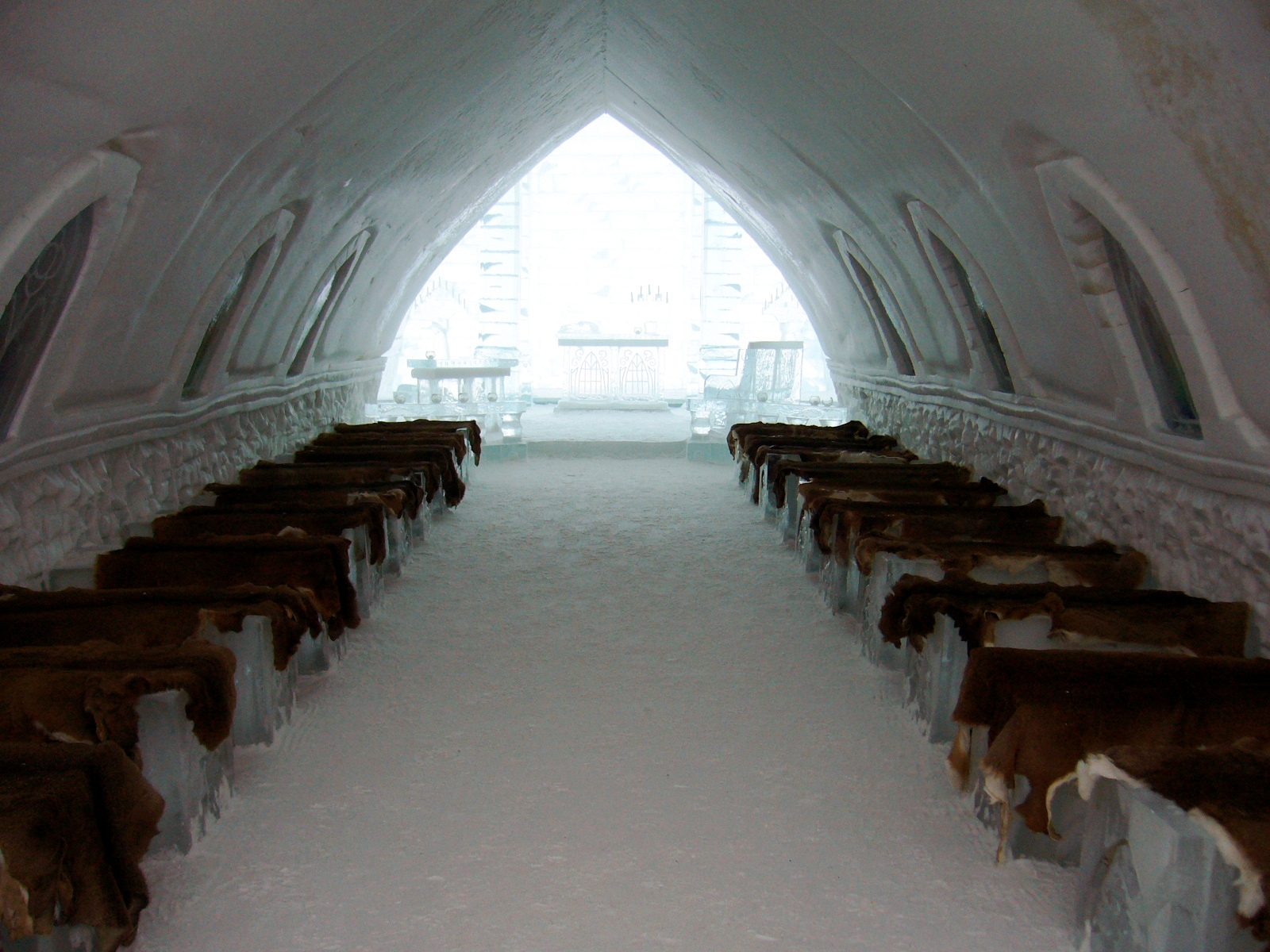
Same Chapel from afar

The hotel is usually made (the architecture and size may vary from season to season) in arches of 16 feet (5 m) over rooms, and larger and higher spaces for a grand hall, a chapel, a bar and a grand ice slide. The walls are over 4 feet (1.2 m) thick on average. All furniture is made of ice. As in the Kiruna ice hotel, the bar serves drinks and cocktails in ice glasses.

Amenities include indoor heated washrooms and outdoor hot tubs.

=== Tourist site ===
The hotel has been described as a "tourist hotspot" and is backed by Quebec's tourism department.

Tours are available in French and in English, seven days a week, and the hotel is otherwise open to the public. After the thirteenth season, the official statistics reported over a million visitors and 43,000 overnight guests. In its fifth season, it hosted around 70,000 tourists.

=== Weddings ===
There is a chapel where weddings are celebrated. The Hôtel de Glace has been described as one of "10 dream wedding locations" by the Irish Independent.

After the Thirteenth season, 275 weddings had been conducted since its opening.

== See also ==
- Château Frontenac
