= Farruko =

Puerto Rican singer (born 1993)

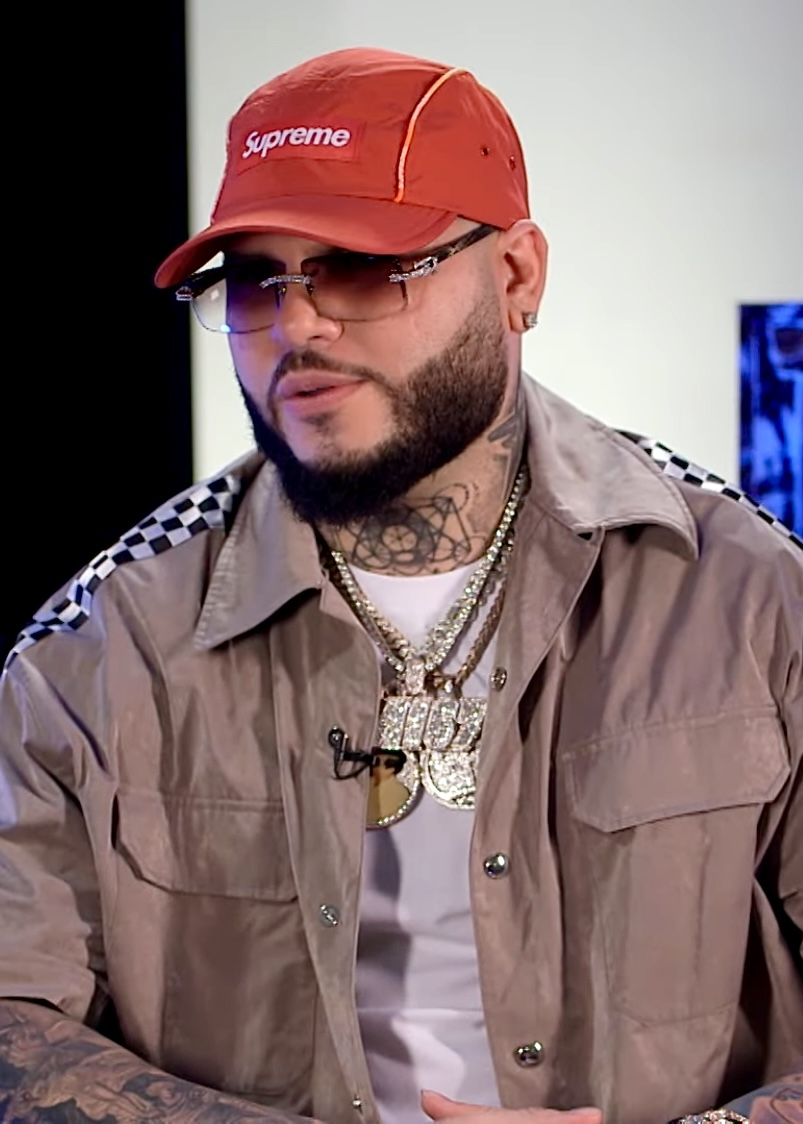
- Farruko in 2021

Background information
- Also known as: El Talento del Bloque
- Born: Carlos Efrén Reyes Rosado; May 2, 1991 (age 35); Bayamón, Puerto Rico
- Genres: Reggaeton; Reggae; urban pop; EDM; Latin trap
- Occupations: Singer; songwriter; rapper; record producer
- Instrument: Vocals
- Works: Farruko discography
- Years active: 2007–present
- Labels: Carbon Fiber; Sony Latin; El Cartel; Siente; Universal Latino

Carlos Efrén Reyes Rosado (born May 2, 1991), known professionally as Farruko, is a Puerto Rican singer-songwriter, rapper, and record producer. He rose to fame collaborating with Daddy Yankee, J Balvin, Don Omar, and J Álvarez. He came to prominence in 2010 with his first solo album, El Talento del Bloque.

== Career ==
=== 2009–2011: Career beginnings ===
Farruko began his career in 2009. He credits Myspace with helping him create a fan base that would eventually result in him becoming a popular singer. In 2011, Farruko appeared on a song with José Feliciano called "Su Hija Me Gusta". As his style developed he typically directed his music to younger people and relationships. As his songs grew in popularity online, Puerto Rican radio stations picked up on the internet hype and began to broadcast Farruko to a wider audience, solidifying his presence in the reggaeton scene.

=== 2012–2022: Early music ===
Farruko was nominated for the Latin Grammy Award for Best Urban Music Album in 2012. In the summer of 2014, Farruko released two hit songs, "Passion Whine" and "6 AM", both with J Balvin. "6 AM" changed Farruko's career for the best, and the two songs reached spots 1 and 2, respectively. "Passion Whine" ranked on the Top Latin Songs list, published by Monitor Latino, for 26 consecutive weeks. The song "6 AM" earned Farruko nominations at Premios Juventud for Best Urban Fusion/Performance and Best Urban Song at the 15th Annual Latin Grammy Awards.

He has been the lead singer or featured on top performing songs including "Krippy Kush", "Inolvidable", "Quiéreme", and "Calma" (remix). Farruko has collaborated with many artists including Bad Bunny, J Balvin, Nicki Minaj, Travis Scott, Ricky Martin, and Wisin & Yandel.

In 2014, Farruko and his manager, Franklin Martínez, cofounded the music label Carbon Fiber Music, which as of 2022 has signed 9 artists.

On June 24, 2021, Farruko released his hit single "Pepas", which has over 1 billion streams on Spotify. The song is a mixture of tribal guarachero and reggaeton.

On February 12, 2022, during a performance at the FTX Arena in Miami, Farruko stopped the concert to give a speech, in which he devoted himself to preaching about God, expressing his problems and asking forgiveness for the lyrics of some of his songs. Responding to complaint of fans, Farruko replied that "Farru is retired and Carlos is here now" and that they will refund the money of dissatisfied attendees. However, Farruko did not actually retire and resumed performing in May 2023.

In 2024, he began releasing music with Christian-based lyrics.

== Arrest ==
On April 3, 2018, Farruko was arrested in Puerto Rico, accused of hiding $52,000 in undeclared cash in shoes and luggage when returning from the Dominican Republic for which he was required to do three years of probation. As of 2026, he had a net worth of $25 million.

== Personal life ==
Farruko became a Christian in 2022. He spoke about his faith in an interview in the same year with Rolling Stone magazine: "Look, I’m a human who was falling, who wasn’t doing the right thing. Now I got up and I’m strong, and you can, too." He also spoke about how his faith helped him reconcile with his family.

== Tours ==
- 2010–2011: El Talento del Bloque Tour
- 2012: TMPR Tour
- 2013: El Imperio Nazza: Farruko Edition Tour
- 2015: Los Menores Tour Bus
- 2016: Visionary World Tour
- 2017: TrapXFicante Tour
- 2019: Gangalee Tour

== Discography ==
=== Studio albums ===
- El Talento del Bloque (2010)
- The Most Powerful Rookie (2012)
- Farruko Presenta: Los Menores (2014)
- Visionary (2015)
- TrapXFicante (2017)
- Gangalee (2019)
- En Letra de Otro (2019)
- La 167 (2021)
- Cvrbon Vrmor (C_DE: G_D.O.N.) (2024)
- Cvrbon Vrmor (2024)
