= Yandel discography =

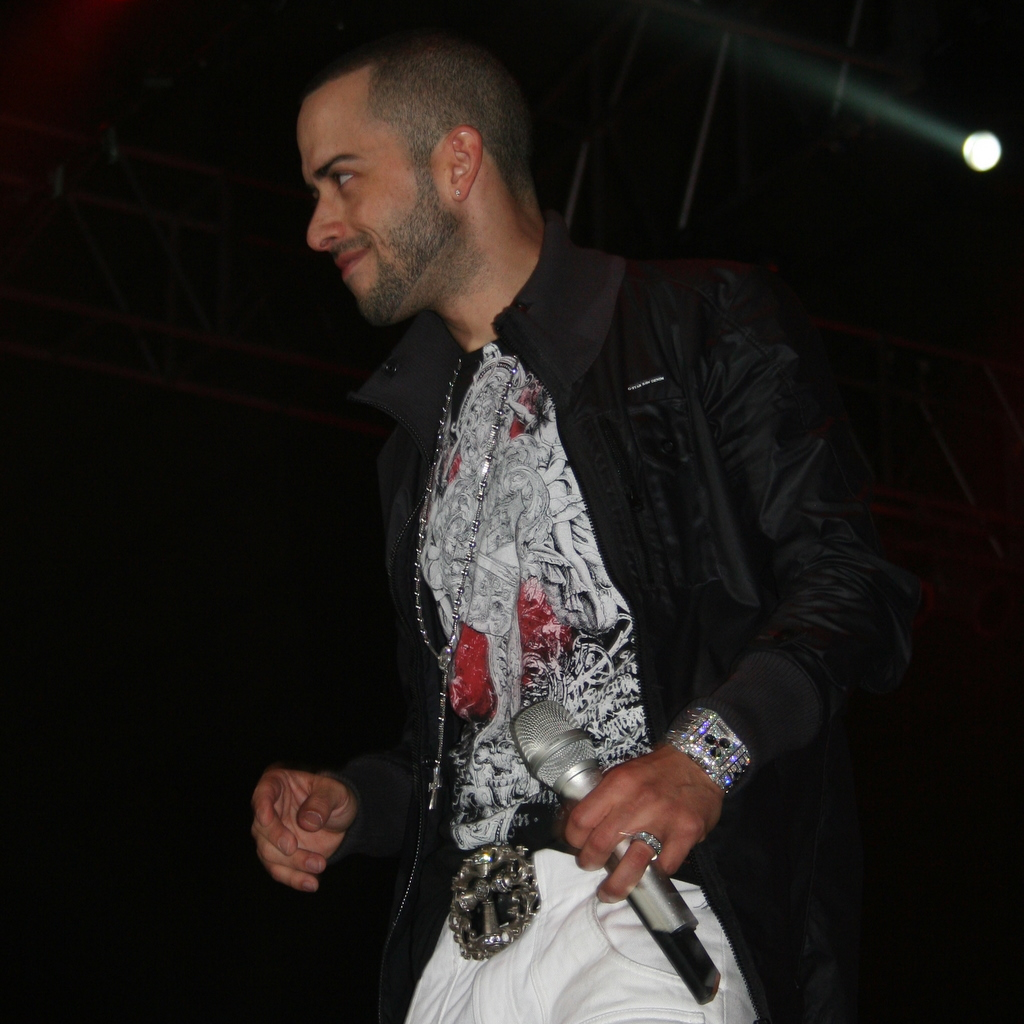
- Studio albums: 7
- EPs: 1
- Live albums: 2
- Singles: 45
- Music videos: 18
- Featured singles: 27

The discography of Puerto Rican Reggaeton singer-songwriter Yandel as a solo artist, consists of seven studio albums (one of them in collaboration with Tainy), two EPs, one live album, and forty-five singles as lead singer. Additionally he featured on 27 singles and eighteen music videos.

== Albums ==
=== Studio albums ===
List of studio albums, with selected details and chart positions
Title	Album details	Peak chart positions						Certifications (sales thresholds)
Title	Album details	SPA	US	US Latin	US Latin Rhyt.	US Rap	MEX	Certifications (sales thresholds)
Quien Contra Mí	Released: September 15, 2003; Label: Fresh Productions; Format: CD, digital download	—	—	24	17	—	—	
De Líder a Leyenda	Released: November 5, 2013; Label: Sony Music Latin; Format: CD, digital downloads	—	76	1	1	9	4	RIAA: Platinum (Latin)
Dangerous	Released: November 6, 2015; Label: Sony Music Latin; Format: CD, digital download	—	101	1	1	—	—	AMPROFON: 2× Platinum; RIAA: 2× Platinum (Latin)
#Update	Released: September 8, 2017; Label: Sony Music Latin; Format: CD, digital download	—	108	2	2	—	—	RIAA: 3× Platinum (Latin)
The One	Released: March 29, 2019; Label: Y Entertainment, Sony Music Latin; Format: Digital download	—	—	13	9	—	—	
Quién Contra Mí 2	Released: July 31, 2020; Label: Y Entertainment, Sony Music Latin; Format: Digital download	12	118	3	3	—	—	RIAA: Platinum (Latin)
Dynasty (with Tainy)	Released: July 15, 2021; Label: Neon16, Y Entertainment, Roc Nation; Format: Digital download	49	—	25	—	—	—	RIAA: Gold (Latin)
Resistencia	Released: January 13, 2023; Label: Y Entertainment, Sony Music Latin; Format: Digital download, streaming	42	—	17	11	—	—	RIAA: Platinum (Latin)
Elyte	Released: October 10, 2024; Label: La Leyenda LLC, Warner Music Latina; Format: Digital download, streaming	—	—	38	15	—	—	RIAA: Gold (Latin)
"—" denotes a recording that did not chart or was not released in that territory.

=== Extended plays ===
List of EPs, with selected details and chart positions
Title	EP details	Peak chart positions		
Title	EP details	SPA	US Latin	US Latin Rhyt.
Legacy: De Líder a Leyenda Tour (EP)	Released: August 25, 2014; Label: Sony Music Latin; Format: Digital download, streaming	—	14	1
Manifesting 20-05 (with Feid)	Released: April 11, 2024; Label: In-Tu Línea, La Leyenda LLC, Universal Music Latino; Format: Digital download, streaming	21	26	13

=== Live albums ===
List of live albums, with selected details and chart positions
Title	Album details	Peak chart positions	
Title	Album details	US Latin	US Latin Rhythm
Legacy: De Líder a Leyenda Tour	Released: February 3, 2015; Label: Sony Music Latin; Format: CD, digital download, streaming	5	1

== Singles ==
=== As lead artist ===
List of singles as lead artist, with selected chart positions and certifications, showing year released and album name
Title	Year	Peak chart positions										Certifications	Album
Title	Year	US	US Latin	US Latin Rhyt.	US Latin Pop	US Trop.	COL	MEX	SPA	VEN	SWI	Certifications	Album
"Te Suelto El Pelo"	2003	—	—	—	—	—	—	—	—	—	—		Quien Contra Mí
"Yo Ya Me Cansé"	2004	—	—	—	—	—	—	—	—	—	—		Quien Contra Mí
"Say Hoo!"	2004	—	—	—	—	—	—	—	—	—	—		Quien Contra Mí
"Hablé de Ti"	2013	—	5	1	3	6	—	—	—	—	—	RIAA: Platinum (Latin)	De Líder a Leyenda
"Hasta Abajo"	2013	—	9	1	1	29	—	19	—	—	—	RIAA: 2× Platinum (Latin)	De Líder a Leyenda
"Moviendo Caderas" (featuring Daddy Yankee)	2014	—	10	2	4	21	—	37	27	—	—	RIAA: 6× Platinum (Latin); AMPROFON: Gold; PROMUSICAE: Platinum	De Líder a Leyenda
"Plakito" (featuring Gadiel, or Gadiel and Farruko)	2014	—	17	21	9	34	—	—	—	—	—	RIAA: 4× Platinum (Latin)	De Líder a Leyenda
"Calentura" (featuring Tempo, or featuring Lil Jon)	2015	—	10	5	1	—	—	—	93	—	—	RIAA: Platinum (Latin)	Dangerous
"Encantadora"	2015	—	3	1	2	7	10	48	40	—	—	RIAA: 14× Platinum (Latin); AMPROFON: Diamond+Gold; PROMUSICAE: Gold	Dangerous
"Nunca Me Olvides"	2015	—	10	1	7	17	—	—	57	—	—	RIAA: 8× Platinum (Latin); PROMUSICAE: Platinum	Dangerous
"Báilame" (with Alex Sensation featuring Shaggy)	2015	—	38	35	29	19	—	—	—	—	—	RIAA: Gold (Latin)	Dangerous
"Imaginar" (with Victor Manuelle)	2016	—	27	18	23	1	—	—	—	—	—	RIAA: Gold (Latin)	Dangerous
"Encantadora" (Remix) (featuring Farruko and Zion & Lennox)	2016	—	—	—	—	—	—	—	24	—	—	PROMUSICAE: 3× Platinum	Non-album single
"Mi Religión"	2017	—	25	13	9	—	—	—	93	—	—	RIAA: 3× Platinum (Latin)	Update
"Explícale" (featuring Bad Bunny)	2017	—	29	—	—	—	88	—	26	—	—	RIAA: 10× Platinum (Latin); PROMUSICAE: Platinum	Update
"Como Antes" (featuring Wisin)	2017	— (Note: "Como Antes" did not enter the Billboard Hot 100, but peaked at number 16 on the Bubbling Under Hot 100 Singles chart.)	7	1	4	—	20	—	62	18	—	RIAA: 7× Platinum (Latin); PROMUSICAE: Gold	Update
"Muy Personal" (featuring J Balvin)	2017	—	—	—	—	—	—	—	—	—	—	RIAA: 2× Platinum (Latin)	Update
"Doble Personalidad" (with Noriel, Trap Capos)	2017	—	—	—	—	—	—	—	—	—	—	RIAA: Platinum (Latin)	Non-album single
"Solo Mía" (featuring Maluma)	2018	—	31	21	9	—	—	—	—	—	—	RIAA: 5× Platinum (Latin)	Update
"Se Acabó El Amor" (with Abraham Mateo and Jennifer Lopez)	2018	—	19	1	5	—	—	—	64	74	83	RIAA: Platinum (Latin)	A Cámara Lenta
"Mira" (with Jerry Rivera)	2018	—	—	—	26	5	—	—	—	—	—		Non-album single
"Sumba Yandel"	2019	—	—	—	—	—	—	—	—	—	—		The One
"Calentón"	2019	—	—	—	—	—	—	—	—	—	—		The One
"Perreito Lite"	2019	—	—	—	—	—	—	—	—	—	—		The One
"En Cero" (with Sebastián Yatra and Manuel Turizo)	2019	—	—	27	17	—	—	—	70	—	—	RIAA: Platinum (Latin)	Non-album single
"Una Vez Más"	2019	—	—	—	—	—	—	—	—	—	—		The One
"Dembow y Reggaeton" (El Alfa, Myke Towers)	2019	—	—	—	—	—	—	—	—	—	—		Non-album singles
"Full Moon" (with Guaynaa)	2019	—	—	—	—	—	—	—	—	—	—		Non-album singles
"Espionaje"	2020	—	—	49	37	—	—	—	—	—	—		Quien Contra Mí 2
"Acompañame" (with Catalyna, Guaynaa)	2020	—	—	—	—	—	—	—	—	—	—		Non-album singles
"Mayor" (with Myke Towers)	2020	—	—	—	—	—	—	—	—	—	—		Non-album singles
"No Te Vayas" (featuring J Balvin)	2020	—	49	—	—	—	—	—	—	—	—	RIAA: Gold (Latin)	Quien Contra Mí 2
"Por Mi Reggae Muero 2020" (with Anuel AA)	2020	—	50	—	—	—	—	—	81	—	—	RIAA: Gold (Latin); PROMUSICAE: Gold	Quien Contra Mí 2
"Hasta Abajo Le Doy" (with Nio Garcia and Brray featuring Juanka, Catalyna)	2020	—	—	—	—	—	—	—	—	—	—		Quien Contra Mí 2
"Celda" (with Manuel Turizo)	2020	—	—	—	—	—	—	—	—	—	—		Quien Contra Mí 2
"La Nota" (with Nio Garcia, Casper Magico)	2020	—	—	—	—	—	—	—	—	—	—		Non-album single
"Ilegal" (with Omy de Oro)	2020	—	—	—	—	—	—	—	—	—	—		Quien Contra Mí 2
"EVA" (with Jay Wheeler)	2020	—	—	—	—	—	—	—	—	—	—		Quien Contra Mí 2
"Ella Entendio" (with Farruko, Arcángel)	2020	—	—	—	—	—	—	—	—	—	—		Quien Contra Mí 2
"Meditar"	2021	—	—	—	22	—	—	—	—	—	—		Non-album singles
"El Palabreo" (with Izzy Guerra, Sour )	2021	—	—	—	—	—	—	—	—	—	—		Non-album singles
"Te Reto" (with Alexis & Fido)	2021	—	—	—	—	—	—	—	—	—	—		Non-album singles
"Deja Vu" (with Tainy)	2021	—	24	1	—	—	—	—	—	—	—	RIAA: Platinum (Latin)	Dynasty
"Si Te Vas" (with Tainy and Saint Jhn)	2021	—	—	—	—	—	—	—	—	—	—		Dynasty
"Una Más" (with Tainy and Rauw Alejandro)	2021	—	—	—	—	—	—	—	—	—	—	RIAA: Platinum (Latin)	Dynasty
"XQ Te Pones Así" (with Feid)	2022	—	—	—	—	—	20	—	53	—	—		Feliz Cumpleaños Ferxxo Te Pirateamos el Álbum
"Yandel 150" (with Feid)	2022	71	6	4	—	—	1	—	2	—	—	RIAA: 3× Platinum (Latin); PROMUSICAE: 7× Platinum	Resistencia
"Yankee 150" (with Feid and Daddy Yankee)	2023	—	—	—	—	—	16	—	45	—	—	RIAA: 2× Platinum (Latin); PROMUSICAE: Gold	Non-album singles
"Gangster (PGFNEDG)" (with Ovy on the Drums and Quevedo)	2023	—	—	—	—	—	—	—	21	—	—		Non-album singles
"Corleone" (with Saiko)	2023	—	—	—	—	—	—	—	16	—	—		Non-album singles
"Háblame Claro" (with Feid)	2024	—	—	—	—	—	15	—	9	—	—	RIAA: Platinum (Latin)	Non-album singles
"—" denotes a recording that did not chart or was not released in that territory.

=== As featured artist ===
List of singles as featured artist, with selected chart positions and certifications, showing year released and album name
Title	Year	Peak chart positions									Certifications	Album
Title	Year	US Latin	US Latin Rhythm	US Latin Pop	US Trop.	MEX	SPA	VEN	COL	SWI	Certifications	Album
"Permítame" (Tony Dize featuring Yandel)	2008	18	20	—	—	—	—	—	—	—		La Melodía de la Calle
"Amor Real" (Gocho featuring Yandel)	2013	6	1	13	10	—	—	—	—	—		Non-album single
"In Your Eyes" (Inna featuring Yandel)	2013	—	—	31	—	—	31	—	—	—		Party Never Ends (Japanese deluxe edition)
"Diggy Down (Remix)" (Inna featuring Yandel and Marian Hill)	2014	—	—	—	—	—	—	—	—	—		Inna / Body and the Sun
"Lejos de Aquí" (Remix) (Farruko featuring Yandel)	2015	—	—	—	—	—	36	—	—	—	PROMUSICAE: Platinum	Non-album single
"Noche y De Día" (Enrique Iglesias featuring Juan Magan and Yandel)	2015	27	26	10	24	—	5	—	—	—	PROMUSICAE: 2× Platinum; FIMI: Gold	Sex and Love
"Como Yo Te Quiero" El Potro Álvarez featuring Yandel)	2015	—	26	—	1	—	—	—	—	—		Non-album singles
"Fronteamos Porque Podemos" (De la Ghetto featuring Daddy Yankee, Yandel and Ñengo Flow)	2015	—	—	—	—	—	—	—	—	—	RIAA: Platinum (Latin)	Non-album singles
"Mayor Que Yo 3" (Luny Tunes featuring Don Omar, Wisin, Daddy Yankee, and Yandel)	2015	20	20	20	16	—	15	—	—	—	PROMUSICAE: 2× Platinum	Non-album singles
"Al Bailar" (Yuri featuring Yandel)	2015	—	—	—	—	—	—	—	—	—		Invencible
"Somos Uno"	2015	—	—	—	—	—	78	—	—	—		Dangerous
"Ay Mi Dios" (Iamchino featuring Pitbull, El Chacal, and Yandel)	2016	9	1	2	1	32	9	—	19	—	RIAA: 8× Platinum (Latin); PROMUSICAE: 4× Platinum	Non-album single
"El Perdedor" (Remix) (Maluma featuring Yandel)	2016	4	1	4	6	1	—	—	—	—		Pretty Boy, Dirty Boy
"Take It Off" (Lil Jon featuring Becky G and Yandel)	2016	45	47	27	—	—	—	—	—	—		Non-album single
"Magia" (Gadiel featuring Yandel)	2016	—	—	—	—	—	—	—	—	—		Alto Rango
"Hey DJ" (reggaeton version) (CNCO featuring Yandel)	2017	14	9	3	—	3	—	—	—	—	RIAA: 7× Platinum (Latin)	CNCO
"Báilame (Remix)" (Nacho with Yandel, Bad Bunny)	2017	5	—	6	—	—	1	—	—	—	AMPROFON: 2× Platinum; PROMUSICAE: 5× Platinum	La Criatura and UNO
"Todo Comienza En La Disco" (Wisin featuring Yandel, Daddy Yankee)	2018	16	1	4	—	11	72	31	—	—		Victory
"Cuidao" (Play-N-Skillz featuring Yandel, Messiah)	2018	—	—	24	—	—	—	—	—	—	RIAA: Gold (Latin)	Non-album single
"Curiosidad" (DJ Luian and Mambo Kingz with Yandel, Jon Z, Zion and Noriel)	2018	—	—	—	—	—	—	—	—	—		Non-album single
"Lo Que Te Duele" (Álvaro Díaz, Yandel)	2020	—	—	—	—	—	—	—	—	—		Non-album single
"Calmarme II" (Amenazzy, Yandel, Mau y Ricky)	2020	—	—	19	—	—	—	—	—	—		Non-album single
"Bubble Gum" (Lele Pons with Yandel)	2021	—	—	—	—	—	—	—	—	—		Non-album single
"Travesuras (Remix)" (Nio Garcia, Casper Magico, Ozuna, Myke Towers, Wisin, Yandel, Flow La Movie)	2021	9	1	—	—	—	—	—	—	—		Non-album single
"No Te Veo (Remix)" (Pacho El Antifeka, Jay Wheeler, Wisin & Yandel)	2021	—	—	—	—	—	—	—	—	—		Non-album single
"Rey" (Sour, Eladio Carrion)	2021	—	—	—	—	—	—	—	—	—		Non-album single
"La Buena (Remix)" (Nacho, Yandel, Justin Quiles)	2021	—	—	—	—	—	—	—	—	—		Non-album single
"Cuanto Vale" (with Lenier)	2021	—	—	—	—	—	—	—	—	—		Non-album single
"Las Olas" with (Micro TDH, Yandel)	2021	—	—	—	—	—	—	—	—	—		Non-album single
"Mamasota" with (Manuel Turizo)	2024	—	—	—	—	—	47	—	—	—		
"Worthy" (with Blanca)	2024	—	—	—	—	—	—	—	—	—		
"Sexo Seguro" (with Franco El Gorilla)	2025	—	—	—	—	—	21	—	—	—		
"—" denotes a title that did not chart, or was not released in that territory.

== Other charted and certified songs ==
Title	Year	Peak chart positions									Certifications	Album
Title	Year	BOL	COL	ECU	PER	SPA	US Latin	US Latin Rhyt.	US Latin Pop	US Trop.	Certifications	Album
"Cuando Baila Reggaeton" (Tego Calderón featuring Yandel)	2006	—	—	—	—	—	—	—	—	29		The Underdog/El Subestimado
"Déjate Amar"	2013	—	—	—	—	—	—	19	—	—	RIAA: Platinum (Latin)	De Líder a Leyenda
"Enamorado de Ti" (featuring Don Omar)	2013	—	—	—	—	—	—	—	—	—	RIAA: Gold (Latin)	De Líder a Leyenda
"En la Oscuridad" (salsa version) (featuring Gilberto Santa Rosa)	2014	—	—	—	—	—	— (Note: "En La Oscuridad" did not enter the Billboard Hot Latin Songs chart but peaked on the Latin Digital Songs chart at number 39.)	36	32	—		Legacy: De Líder a Leyenda Tour
"Pa'l Piso" (Plan B featuring Yandel)	2014	—	—	—	—	—	—	18	—	—		Love & Sex
"Asesina" (featuring Pitbull)	2015	—	—	—	—	97	—	—	—	—		Dangerous
"Fantasía"	2015	—	—	—	—	—	—	—	—	—	RIAA: Gold (Latin)	Dangerous
"Mi Combo" (Spiff TV featuring Yandel and Future)	2015	—	—	—	—	—	—	—	—	19		Dangerous
"No Sales de Mi Mente"	2015	—	—	—	—	61	—	—	—	—	RIAA: Platinum (Latin)	Dangerous
"Gozadera (Playa, Sol & Arena)" (Luny Tunes featuring Don Omar, Wisin, El Potro Alvarez, Yandel)	2016	—	—	—	—	—	—	—	—	13		TBA
"Despacio" (featuring Farruko)	2017	—	—	—	—	—	—	—	—	—		TBA
"Desperté Sin Ti" (Remix) (Noriel featuring Yandel & Nicky Jam)	2017	—	—	—	—	—	50	—	—	—	RIAA: 3× Platinum (Latin)	TBA
"No Pare"	2017	—	—	—	—	—	—	—	—	—	RIAA: Platinum (Latin)	Update
"No Quiero Amores" (featuring Ozuna)	2017	—	—	—	—	—	—	—	—	—	RIAA: 2× Platinum (Latin)	Update
"Si Se Da" (featuring Plan B)	2017	—	—	—	—	—	—	—	—	—	RIAA: Gold (Latin)	Update
"Si No Estas" (Christian Daniel featuring Yandel)	2018	—	—	—	—	—	—	—	40	—		TBA
"Cancion Con Yandel" (Bad Bunny featuring Yandel)	2020	—	—	—	—	12	13	—	—	—	RIAA: 4× Platinum (Latin)	Las que no iban a salir
"Antes y Después" (With Anuel AA, Yandel, Kendo Kaponi)	2020	—	—	—	—	60	23	—	—	—		Emmanuel
"Lotto (Remix)" (With Joyner Lucas, G-Eazy)	2020	—	—	—	—	—	—	—	—	—		ADHD
"Dembow 2020" (with Rauw Alejandro)	2020	—	—	—	—	—	—	—	—	—	RIAA: Platinum (Latin); PROMUSICAE: Gold	Quién Contra Mí 2
"Te Acuerdas de Mí" (J Balvin featuring Yandel)	2021	—	—	—	—	—	33	—	—	—		Jose
"1+1" (Sia featuring Yandel and Sofía Reyes)	2021	—	—	—	—	—	—	—	—	—		Music – Songs from and Inspired by the Motion Picture
"Polvora" (with Mora)	2023	—	—	—	—	34	—	—	—	—		Estrella
"Sigo Enamorau" (with Eladio Carrión)	2024	—	—	—	—	40	—	—	—	—		Sol María
"Fecha" (with Feid)	2024	—	19	—	—	43	—	—	—	—		Manifesting 20-05
"No Digas Na'" (with Feid)	2024	—	25	—	—	52	—	—	—	—		Manifesting 20-05
"Brickell" (with Feid)	2024	24	2	3	9	83	15	1	—	—		Manifesting 20-05
"Porsche Carrera" (with Jhayco and Haze)	2024	—	—	—	—	79	—	—	—	—		Le Clique: Vida Rockstar (X)
"—" denotes a title that did not chart, or was not released in that territory.

== Music videos ==
List of music videos, showing year released and directors
Year	Music video	Artist(s)	Director	Ref.
As lead artist
2003	"Te Suelto El Pelo" (Note: The songs "En La Disco Me Conoció" and "Mami Yo Quisiera Quedarme" which features Alexis & Fido, were used as outro of the music video of "Te Suelto El Pelo".)	Yandel featuring Alexis & Fido	David Impelluso	
2004	"Yo Ya Me Cansé"	Yandel	Louis Martinez	
2004	"Say Ho!"	Yandel	Louis Martinez	
2013	"Hablé de Ti"	Yandel	Carlos Pérez	
2013	"Da Show" (Must Go On: Special Footage)	Yandel	Luis Carmona	
2013	"Hasta Abajo"	Yandel	Carlos Pérez	
2014	"Moviendo Caderas"	Yandel featuring Daddy Yankee	Carlos Pérez	
2014	"Déjate Amar"	Yandel	LabTwenty	
2014	"Plakito" + Remix feat. Gadiel and Farruko	Yandel featuring Gadiel	Fernando Lugo	
2015	"Calentura" + Remix feat. Tempo	Yandel	Jessy Terrero	
As featured artist
Year	Music video	Artist(s)	Director	Ref.
2008	"Permítame"	Tony Dize featuring Yandel	Marlon Peña	
2012	"Sexo y Pasión"	Gadiel featuring Yandel	Luis Carmona	
2013	"Amor Real"	Gocho featuring Yandel	Carlos Pérez	
2013	"In Your Eyes"	Inna featuring Yandel	Barna Némethi	
2015	"Noche y de Día"	Enrique Iglesias featuring Juan Magan and Yandel	Alejandro Pérez	
2015	"Como Yo Te Quiero"	El Potro Álvarez featuring Yandel	Jessy Terrero	
2015	"Diggy Down" (Remix)	Inna featuring Marian Hill and Yandel	John Perez	
2016	"Take It Off"	Lil Jon featuring Yandel & Becky G	Daniel Duran	

== Album appearances ==
The following songs are not singles or promotional singles and have not appeared on an album by Yandel.

Title	Year	Album
"Al Natural" (Tego Calderón feat. Yandel)	2004	El Enemy de los Guasíbiri
"La Calle Me Llama" (Alexis & Fido feat. Yandel)	2006	Los Reyes del Perreo
"Asi Soy" (Franco "El Gorila" feat. Yandel)	2009	Welcome to the Jungle
"Vamos A Hacerlo" (Franco "El Gorila" feat. Yandel)	2009	Welcome to the Jungle
"Amanece" (Jowell & Randy feat. Gadiel and Yandel)	2010	El Momento
"Me Gustas" (Tito El Bambino feat. Yandel)	2013	Invicto
"Calentón" (Daddy Yankee feat. Yandel)	2013	King Daddy
"Pa'l Piso" (Plan B feat. Yandel)	2014	Love and Sex
"Mi Peor Error" (Live Version) (Alejandra Guzmán feat. Yandel)	2014	La Guzmán en: Primera Fila (Deluxe Edition)
"Marcando Territorio"	2015	Catch the Throne: The Mixtape Vol. 2
"Al Bailar" (Yuri feat. Yandel)	2015	Invencible
"A Que No Te Atreves (Remix)" (Tito El Bambino feat. Daddy Yankee, Chencho and Yandel)	2015	Alta Jerarquía
"No Puedo Mas" (Pitbull feat. Yandel)	2015	Dale

=== Online-only tracks ===
Title	Year	Notes
"Sexo y Pasión" (Gadiel feat. Yandel)	2012	Accompanied by a music video.
"Yo Soy De Aquí" (Don Omar, Daddy Yankee, Arcangel and Yandel)	2013	Accompanied by a music video.
"Mi Peor Error" (Remix) (Alejandra Guzmán feat. Yandel)	2014	Studio version.
