= Data (album) =

Studio album by Tainy
- Released: June 29, 2023
- Genre: Reggaeton; Latin trap
- Length: 63:29
- Language: Spanish
- Label: Neon16
- Producer: Tainy; Tomoko Ida; Carlos Lopez; Albert Hype; Arca; Jota Rosa; E.Vax; Gibran Alcocer; Richie Lopez; Lil Baby Grand; Skrillex; Four Tet; Tuiste; Mvsis; De la Cruz; Jon Leone

Tainy chronology
Dynasty (2021)	Data (2023)

Singles from Data
- 1. "Lo Siento BB:/" Released: October 5, 2021; 2. "Sci-Fi" Released: July 22, 2022; 3. "Obstáculo" Released: May 26, 2023; 4. "Fantasma | AVC" Released: June 1, 2023; 5. "La Baby" Released: June 26, 2023; 6. "Colmillo" Released: October 11, 2023

Data is the first solo studio album, and second overall including the collaborative album Dynasty (2021), by Puerto Rican record producer and songwriter Tainy. It was released on June 29, 2023, through Tainy's record label Neon16.

A 20-track album, each song features a different singer or musician. Arca, Arcángel, Bad Bunny, Chencho Corleone, Daddy Yankee, E.Vax, Feid, Four Tet, J Balvin, Jhayco, Jowell & Randy, Julieta Venegas, Kany García, Myke Towers, Ozuna, Rauw Alejandro, Sech, Skrillex, The Marías, Wisin & Yandel, Young Miko and Zion, among others, appear as featured artists. Production was handled mainly by Tainy himself, with Tomoko Ida, Carlos Lopez, Albert Hype, Arca, Jota Rosa, E.Vax, Gibran Alcocer, Richie Lopez, Lil Baby Grand, Skrillex, Four Tet, Tuiste, Mvsis, De la Cruz and Jon Leone, also having production credits.

The album spawned six singles: "Lo Siento BB:/", "Sci-Fi", "Obstáculo", "Fantasma | AVC", "La Baby", and "Colmillo". The former single was highly successful, charting in various countries and being certified platinum multiple times in the United States. It also won Best Reggaeton Performance at the 23rd Annual Latin Grammy Awards.

Data debuted at number 11 on the Billboard 200 and number two on the Top Latin Albums chart, being his fourth entry on the latter chart. It also reached the top of the Latin Rhythm Albums chart, being his first appearance on the chart since Mas Flow: Los Benjamins in 2006. In Spain, the album debuted at the top of the chart.

== Background ==
Tainy came to prominence at age 15 when he collaborated in Luny Tunes's album Mas Flow: Los Benjamins (2006), where he worked with various reggaeton artists such as Wisin & Yandel, Don Omar and Arcángel, among others. During the 2000s, he produced albums like Wisin vs. Yandel: Los Extraterrestres (2007), Daddy Yankee's El Cartel: The Big Boss (2007) and Arcángel's El Fenómeno (2008), furthering his career as a producer within the reggaeton industry.

In 2021, Tainy released his debut studio album Dynasty, a collaborative album with Puerto Rican singer Yandel. The same year, he released "Lo Siento BB:/", a collaboration with Puerto Rican rapper Bad Bunny and Mexican musician Julieta Venegas, the song would eventually become the first single for Data. According to Tainy, the album took around three years to make, with the first ideas for the album coming after a trip to Tulum, Mexico. Most of the recording for the album took place in Miami with additional recording in Puerto Rico, Mexico, Spain, New York, Los Angeles and Kioto. The album consists of several collaborations with reggaeton artists that Tainy had previously worked with such as Daddy Yankee, Bad Bunny and Wisin & Yandel, among others, as well as non-reggaeton artists like Julieta Venegas and the Marías, and emerging Latin acts like Young Miko, Álvaro Díaz and Kris Floyd. Tainy said that "Data is a representation of who I am as a person and as a music fan, being able to have my own album is very special, I'm putting my all into this, everything I've learned since I started working with the people I admire".

In 2023, after the released of the album's third single "Obstáculo", Tainy announced the release date for the album. On 16 June 2023, he shared the tracklist via his Instagram. The post showed a tracklist composed of twenty songs including "Colmillo", featuring Colombian singer J Balvin, Puerto Rican rapper Young Miko and Puerto Rican duo Jowell & Randy, as the tenth track. "Colmillo" was discarded from the album, lowering the final number of tracks to nineteen. However, "Colmillo" was later added on the album and released as the 6th single on October 11, 2023, completing the album.

== Composition ==
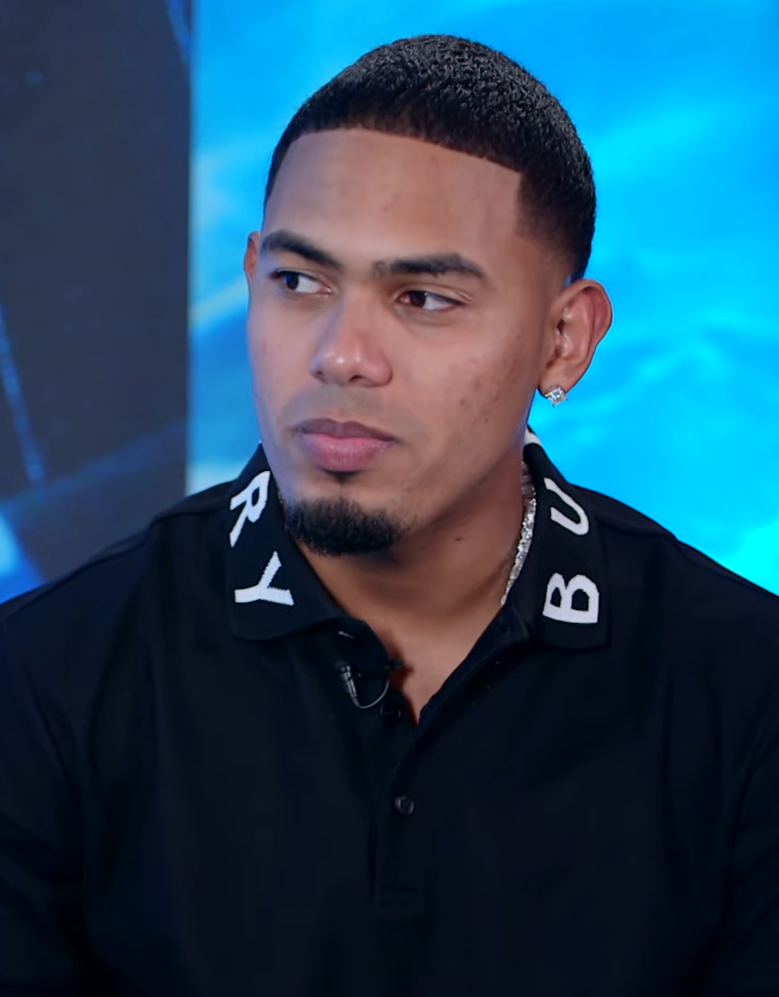
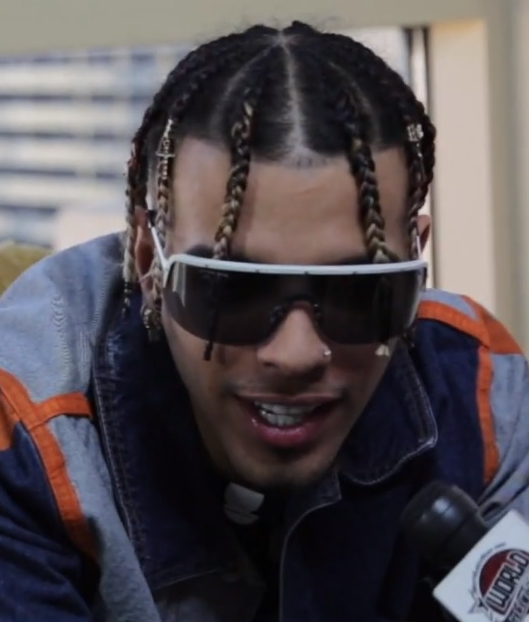
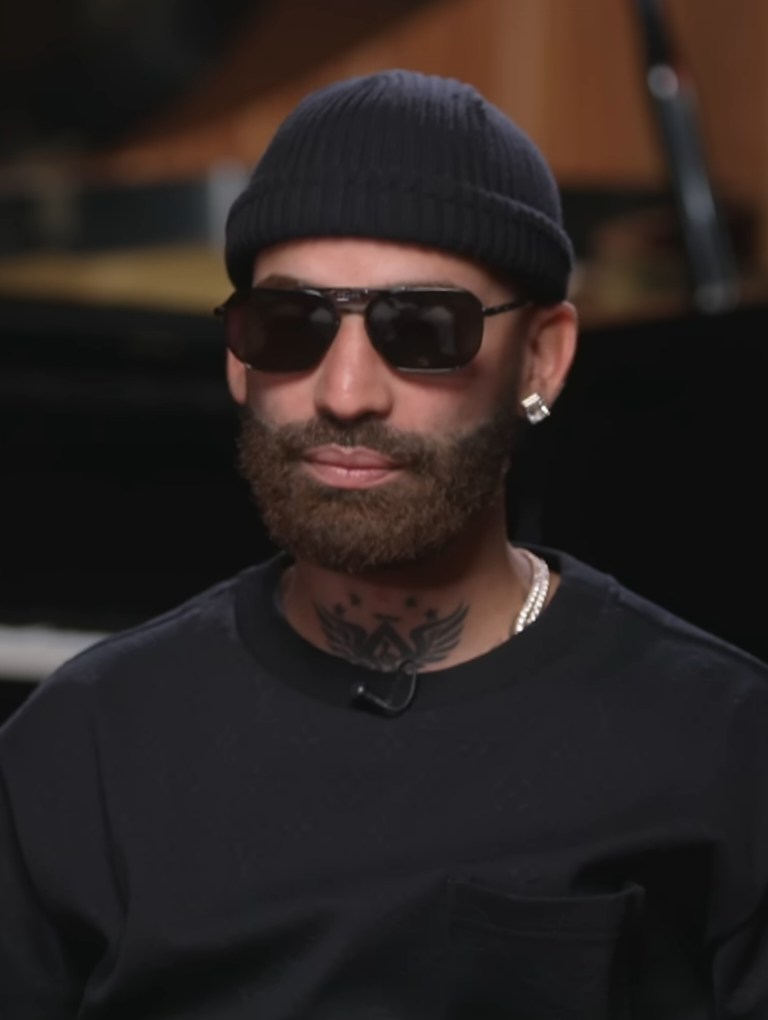
Singers Myke Towers (left), Rauw Alejandro (center) and Arcángel (right) appear in multiple songs in the album.

The album is composed of nineteen tracks, each featuring at least one artist. Some singers make multiple appearances in the album such as Myke Towers ("Obstáculo" and "Pasiempre"), Rauw Alejandro ("Volver" and "Sci-Fi"), Sech ("11 y Once" and "La Baby"), Jhayco ("Pasiempre" and "Fantasma | AVC"), Arcángel ("Pasiempre" and "Me Jodí...") and Bad Bunny ("Mojabi Ghost", "Lo Siento BB:/" and "Pasiempre", the latter uncredited). About the collaborations, Tainy said "I wanted to pay homage to some of the first artists who gave me a chance", referring to the artists with whom he worked at the beginning of his career.

Data deals with themes of success, struggle and technology. "Pasiempre" features lines about success within the music industry as well as having a lasting career as an artist. In the song, Arcángel raps the line: "Because I'm not an artist of the moment, I'm an artist forever". In the same song, Bad Bunny, who makes an uncredited appearance, references Tainy's career mentioning his influence in reggaeton music while also giving a shout-out to Nely el Arma Secreta and Luny Tunes, producers that helped bring Tainy into the industry. Similarly, in the opening track "Obstáculo", Myke Towers raps about the struggles in life and the obstacles he had to overcome throughout his career. In the closing track "Sacrificio", which has been called the "most personal song in the album", rapper Xantos talks about the sacrifices one has to do to succeed. Technology makes appearances throughout the album specifically in relation to human connections. In "Fantasma | AVC", Jhayco raps about "getting ghosted in a relationship in which you'd like to go further", while in "En Visto", which can be translated to "On Read", Ozuna sings about the feeling of missing someone and wanting to reconnect with them.

Mainly a reggaeton album, Data explores various genres and musical influences. "Pasiempre", blends hip hop with experimental and electronic sounds towards the end, "Todavía", a minimalistic "classic reggaeton song" and "En Visto", described as "one of the more reggaeton sounding songs of the album". Poppier sounds appear in "Mojabi Ghost", which mixes reggaeton and electro-pop with 80s new wave influences and "Paranormal", a mix of electro-pop and "spacey effects". More electronic songs are "Fantasma | AVC", which contains drum and bass elements and "Volver", which features an EDM beat. Finally, urban influences appear in the R&B-infused "Si Preguntas por Mí" and "Sci-Fi", a fusion of pop, space electronic, and Spanish R&B.

The album also features more slower and atmospheric songs such as "11 y Once", a "heartfelt slow perreo" that features electric guitars and puts enphasis on Sech's voice while also using robotic effects to represent the fusion between technology and human emotions, "mañana", a pop ballad with trap influences, "Me Jodí...", an old school hip-hop song that features "smooth synths and spacey oriental inspired strings" and the stripped "Sacrificio", whose instrumental feature violins and a classical piano.

== Concept ==
The album explores the themes of human connections and technology. Its name comes from the idea of music and songs as information that we receive, "data" that shapes the way we are. In response to that, Tainy envisioned the album as a film about a cyborg named Sena who comes to life through songs. Continuing the idea, Tainy has said that the album "serves as a series of uploads that ultimately bring a cyborg named Sena to life". The cover art features Sena, a pink haired android that seems to have come to life, it was designed by Stillz, Elliot Muscat and Hiromasa Ogura, the latter of whom was the art director of Mamoru Oshii's 1995 animated film Ghost in the Shell. Sena also appears in the music video of "Lo Siento BB:/" as well as in the cover art for the single.

== Promotion ==
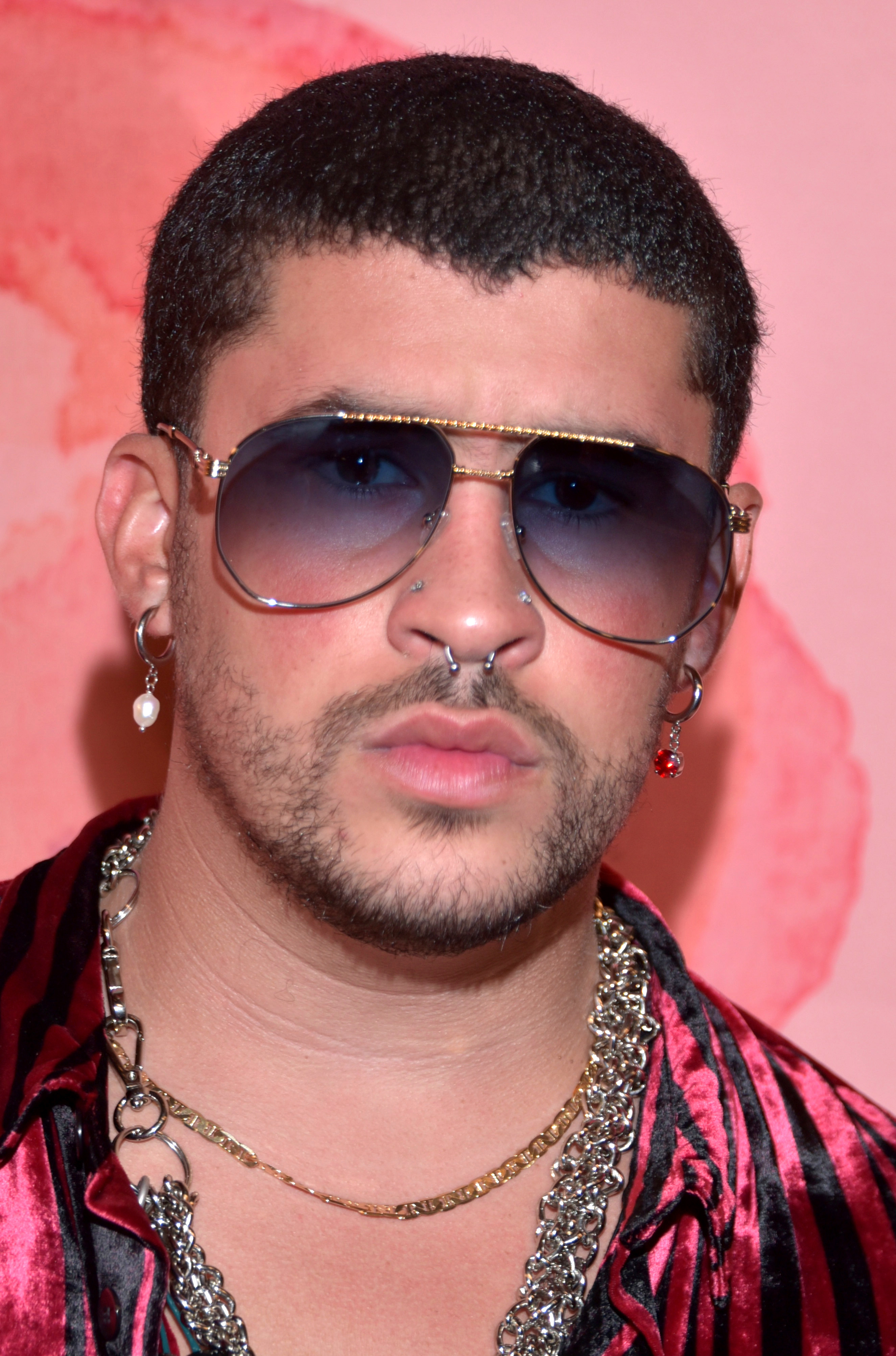
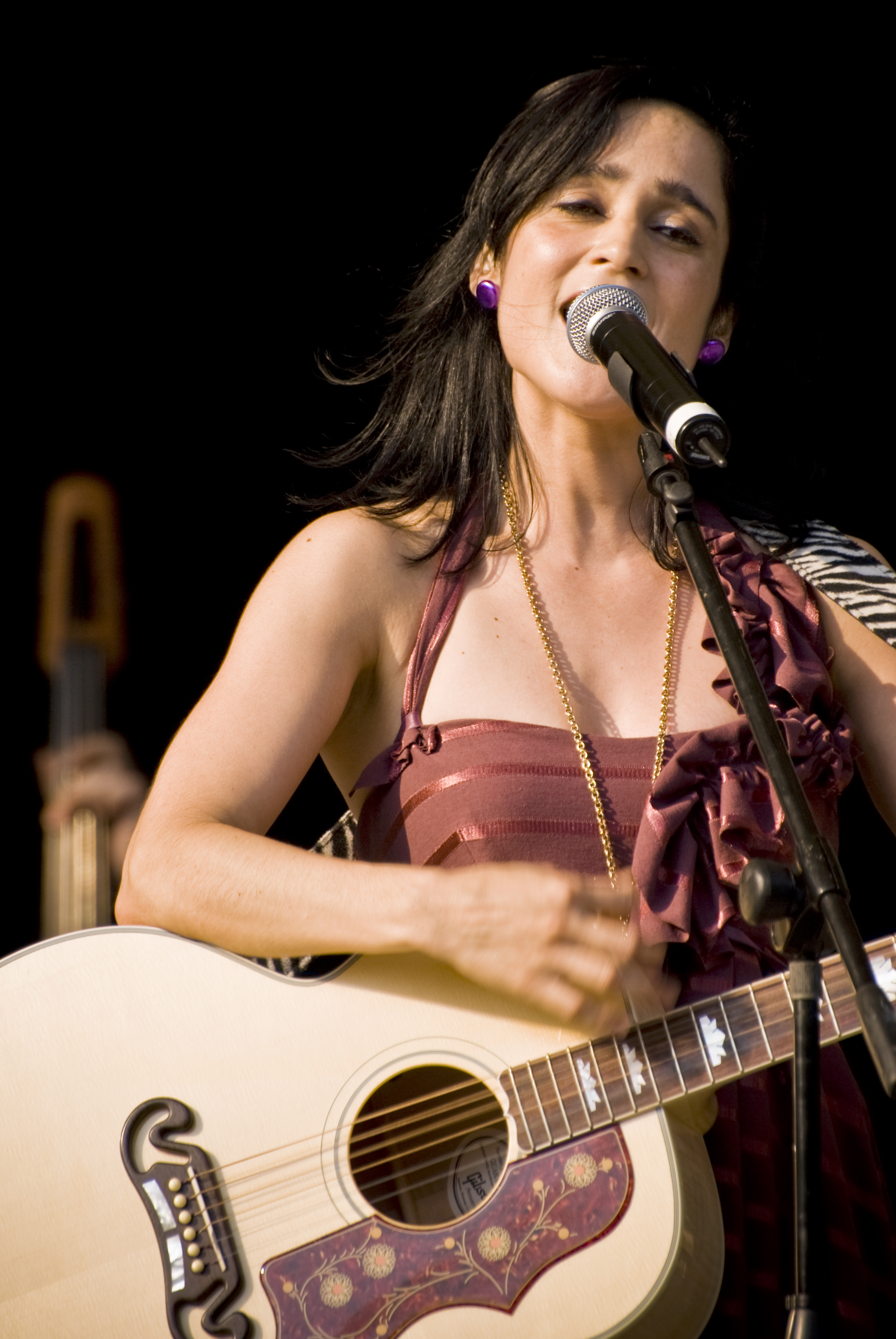
Puerto Rican singer Bad Bunny (left) and Mexican singer-songwriter Julieta Venegas (right) feature in "Lo Siento BB:/", the album's lead single.

=== Singles and music videos ===
The album was supported by five singles, all released in the span of three years. The first single was "Lo Siento BB:/", a collaboration with Bad Bunny and Julieta Venegas. Released on 5 October 2021, the song achieved great success becoming one of Tainy's most commercially successful singles. In the United States, the song peaked at number 51 at the Billboard Hot 100 chart, being Tainy's second highest entry in the chart after "Summer of Love" with Shawn Mendes, which peaked at number 48. It also peaked at number 2 at the Hot Latin Songs chart. The song was certified platinum eleven times in the country with over 660,000 certifications units. In Latin America, the song entered the top 10 in Bolivia, Chile, Colombia, Ecuador and Peru, and topped the songs chart in Mexico. In Spain, the song peaked at number five and was certified platinum. A music video for the song was released on 5 October 2021, directed by Bad Bunny's longtine collaborator Stillz.

On 21 July 2022, "Sci-Fi" featuring Rauw Alejandro was released as the second single. Throughout 2023, three singles were released, all with their respective music videos. The third single was "Obstáculo", featuring Myke Towers, released on May 26, followed by "Fantasma | AVC" featuring Jhayco as the fourth single, released on 1 June. The latter song peaked at number 69 in Spain. On 26 June, "La Baby" featuring Daddy Yankee, Feid and Sech was released as the fifth single for the album. Its music video was intended as a "homage to all the incredible women in Latin music", and features singers Bad Gyal, Young Miko, Lali, Becky G, Camila Cabello, Evaluna Montaner, Elena Rose, RaiNao and paopao. On 11 October, "Colmillo" featuring J Balvin, Young Miko, Jowell & Randy was released as the sixth and final single for the album. Its music video was released into two parts, the original and uncensored video that contains the unblurred steamy hentai scene, reminiscent of the visuals for the album. In addition to the music videos for the singles, visualizers for the remaining songs in the album were released and uploaded to Tainy's YouTube account.

Following the release of the album, the track "Mojabi Ghost" peaked at number 57 at the Billboard Hot 100 while "Pasiempre" appeared at number 20 at the Bubbling Under Hot 100 chart. Additionally the tracks "Mojabi Ghost", "Pasiempre" and "La Baby" entered the Hot Latin Songs at numbers 9, 28, 47, respectively.

== Reception ==
Professional ratings
Review scores
Source	Rating
Mor.bo	8.3/10
Pitchfork	6.8/10

Upon release, the album received positive reviews from critics. Writing for Rolling Stone, Julyssa Lopez gave the album four out of five stars commenting that the album "feels like downloading the deepest contents of the super-producer's brain and seeing his creative process directly in front of you", she complimented the concept and collaborations writing that the tracks are "crystalline creations – some club-ready, others full of intrigue and nostalgia – that push a roster of star artists far outside their comfort zone". The Fame Magazine called the album "a tour-de-force that reflects Tainy's deep influence in the music industry" while Billboard described it as a "layered, sophisticated set that yields surprising sounds". Mirangie Alayon from Mor.bo rated the album an 8.3 out of 10, writing that "Although Data would have benefited from a more severe cut to their set list, there's no denying that this album brilliantly reflects Tainy's talents as a producer".

At the 23rd Annual Latin Grammy Awards, the lead single "Lo Siento BB:/" was nominated for Best Urban Song and won Best Reggaeton Performance. It was Tainy's fifth Latin Grammy win as well as his first as a performing artist after winning as a producer and songwriter for albums by Bad Bunny and J Balvin.

On its year-end list, Rolling Stone named Data as the third-best album of 2023.

== Commercial performance ==
In the United States, the album debuted at numbers 35 and 19 at the Top Latin Albums and Latin Rhythm Albums charts, respectively. The following week, the album peaked at number 2 at the Top Latin Albums chart and topped the Latin Rhythm Albums chart being his second number-one album in the latter chart after Mas Flow: Los Benjamins in 2006. The same week, the album debuted at number 11 at the all-genre Billboard 200 chart with 31,000 units sold, being his highest appearance in the chart.

== Track listing ==
Data track listing
No.	Title	Writer(s)	Producer(s)	Length
1.	"Obstáculo" (with Myke Towers)	Marco Masis; Amanda Ibanez; Lara Fernández Castrelo; Michael Torres	Tainy; Tomoko Ida; Carlos Lopez	2:15
2.	"Pasiempre" (with Arcángel and Jhayco featuring Arca, Myke Towers and Omar Courtz)	Masis; Torres; Alberto Carlos Melendez; Alejandra Ghersi; Austin Santos; Jesus Nieves Cortez; Joshua Medina Cortes	Tainy; Albert Hype; Arca	5:55
3.	"Todavía" (with Wisin & Yandel)	Masis; Abner Cordero Boria; Andres Jael Correa; Juan Morera Luna; Llandel Veguilla	Tainy	3:23
4.	"Fantasma | AVC" (with Jhayco)	Masis; Nieves Cortes; Cordero Boria; Bryan Masis	Tainy; Jota Rosa	4:45
5.	"Mojabi Ghost" (with Bad Bunny)	Masis; Benito Martínez Ocasio	Tainy	3:52
6.	"11 y Once" (with E.Vax and Sech)	Masis; Evan Mast; Carlos Morales Williams	Tainy; E.Vax	3:16
7.	"Desde las 10 (Kany's Interlude)" (with Kany García)	Masis; Encarnita García de Jesús; Gibran Alcocer; Peter Marshall; Ricardo López	Tainy; Gibran Alcocer; Richie Lopez; Lil Baby Grand	1:00
8.	"Mañana" (with Young Miko and the Marías)	Masis; Joshua David Conway; María Victoria Ramírez de Arellano; María Zardoya; Peter Marshall	Tainy; Lil Baby Grand	2:55
9.	"Buenos Aires" (with Mora and Zion)	Masis; Felix Ortiz Torres; Gabriel Mora Quintero	Tainy	1:58
10.	"Colmillo" (with J Balvin and Young Miko featuring Jowell & Randy)	Maxis; Héctor Delgado; J Castle; Javier Gómez Torres; Javier Marcano; Joel Muñoz; Randy Ortiz; José Álvaro Osorio Balvín; Josias de la Cruz; Ramírez de Arellano	Tainy	4:25
11.	"La Baby" (with Daddy Yankee and Feid featuring Sech)	Masis; Morales Williams; Ramon Ayala; Salomon Villada Hoyos	Tainy	3:02
12.	"Me Jodí..." (with Arcángel)	Masis; Nieves Cortes; Santos; Chris Lebron	Tainy	3:21
13.	"Volver" (with Rauw Alejandro and Four Tet featuring Skrillex)	Masis; Raúl Ocasio Ruiz; Kieran Hebden; Sonny John Moore; Kevyn Cruz Moreno	Tainy; Skrillex; Four Tet	3:05
14.	"En Visto" (with Ozuna)	Masis; Lopez; Eduardo Vargas Berrios; Jan Ozuna Rosado	Tainy; Richie Lopez	2:33
15.	"Lo Siento BB:/" (with Bad Bunny and Julieta Venegas)	Masis; Martínez Ocasio; Julieta Venegas Percevault	Tainy	3:26
16.	"Si Preguntas por Mí" (with Judeline and Kris Floyd)	Masis; Fernández Castrelo; Christopher Ramos Carballo; Bryan Masis; Misael De la Cruz; Pablo Lopez García	Tainy; Tuiste; Mvsis; De la Cruz	3:35
17.	"Sci-Fi" (with Rauw Alejandro)	Masis; Cordero Boria; Ocasio Ruiz; Jorge Pizarro	Tainy	3:17
18.	"Corleone Interlude" (with Chencho Corleone)	Masis; Orlando Vega Valle	Tainy	1:30
19.	"Paranormal" (with Álvaro Díaz)	Masis; Jorge Álvaro Díaz; Jonathan David Leone	Tainy; Jon Leone	3:17
20.	"Sacrificio" (with Xantos)	Masis; Lopez; Alcocer; Marshall; Americo Cespedes Santos	Tainy; Gibran Alcocer; Richie Lopez; Lil Baby Grand	2:29
Total length:				63:29

=== Notes ===
- "Pasiempre" features uncredited vocals by Bad Bunny.
- "Colmillo" was discarded from the album during the album's launch, but later added on October 11.
- "Volver" samples "Lush", written and performed by Four Tet.

== Personnel ==
=== Musicians ===
- Tainy – lead artist, composition (all tracks), production (all tracks)
- Myke Towers – featured artist, composition (tracks 1, 2)
- Amanda Ibanez – composition (track 1)
- Lara Fernández Castrelo – composition (tracks 1, 15)
- Arcángel – featured artist, composition (tracks 2, 11)
- Arca – featured artist, composition, production (track 2)
- Bad Bunny – featured artist, composition (tracks 2 (uncredited), 5, 14)
- Jhayco – featured artist, composition (tracks 2, 4)
- Omar Courtz – featured artist, composition (track 2)
- Wisin – featured artist, composition (track 3)
- Yandel – featured artist, composition (track 3)
- Abner Cordero Boria – composition (tracks 3, 4, 16)
- Andres Jael Correa – composition (track 3)
- Sech – featured artist, composition (tracks 6, 10)
- E.Vax – featured artist, composition, production (track 6)
- Kany García – featured artist, composition (track 7)
- Young Miko – featured artist, composition (tracks 8, 10)
- The Marías – featured artist, composition (track 8)
- Mora – featured artist, composition (track 9)
- Zion – featured artist, composition (track 9)
- J Balvin - featured artist, composition (track 10)
- Jowell & Randy - featured artist, composition (track 10)
- Daddy Yankee – featured artist, composition (track 11)
- Feid – featured artist, composition (track 11)
- Chris Lebron – composition (track 12)
- Rauw Alejandro – featured artist, composition (tracks 13, 17)
- Skrillex – featured artist, composition, production (track 13)
- Four Tet – featured artist, composition, production (track 13)
- Kevyn Cruz Moreno – composition (track 13)
- Ozuna – featured artist, composition (track 14)
- Eduardo Vargas Berrios – composition (track 14)
- Julieta Venegas – featured artist, composition (track 15)
- Kris Floyd – featured artist, composition (track 16)
- Judeline – featured artist, composition (track 16)
- Chencho Corleone – featured artist, composition (track 18)
- Álvaro Díaz – featured artist, composition (track 19)
- Xantos – featured artist, composition (track 20)

=== Technical ===
- Tomoko Ida – production (track 1)
- Carlos López – production (track 1)
- Albert Hype – production, composition (track 2)
- Jota Rosa – production (track 4)
- Mvsis – composition (tracks 4, 15), production (track 15)
- Gibran Alcocer – production, composition (tracks 7, 19)
- Richie López – production, composition (track 7, 19)
- Lil Baby Grand – production, composition (tracks 7, 8, 19)
- Tuiste – production, composition (track 15)
- De la Cruz – production, composition (track 15)
- Jon Leone – production, composition (track 18)
- Josh Gudwin – mixing
- Kenobi Sensei – engineering
- La Paciencia – engineering
- Stillz – art direction
- Elliott Muscat – art direction
- Hiromasa Ogura – artwork

== Charts ==
=== Weekly charts ===
Weekly chart performance for Data
Chart (2023)	Peak position
Spanish Albums (Promusicae)	1
Swiss Albums (Schweizer Hitparade)	68
US Billboard 200	11
US Top Latin Albums (Billboard)	2
US Latin Rhythm Albums (Billboard)	1

=== Year-end charts ===
2023 year-end chart performance for Data
Chart (2023)	Position
Spanish Albums (PROMUSICAE)	40
US Top Latin Albums (Billboard)	33
US Latin Rhythm Albums (Billboard)	15

== Certifications ==
Certifications for Data
Region	Certification	Certified units/sales
Spain (Promusicae)	Platinum	40,000^{‡}
United States (RIAA)	6× Platinum (Latin)	360,000^{‡}
^{‡} Sales+streaming figures based on certification alone.

== See also ==
- 2023 in Latin music
- List of number-one Billboard Latin Rhythm Albums of 2023
