= Wisin & Yandel =

Puerto Rican reggaeton duo

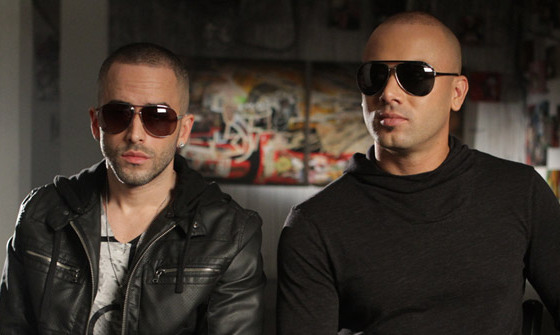
- Wisin (right) and Yandel (left) in 2011

Background information
- Also known as: El Dúo de la Historia; El Dúo Dinámico; La Gerencia; Los Campeones del Pueblo; Los Extraterrestres; Los Líderes; Los Reyes del Nuevo Milenio; Los Vaqueros
- Origin: Cayey, Puerto Rico
- Genre: Reggaeton
- Years active: 1998–2013; 2018–2023
- Labels: WY; Machete; Fresh; Universal Latino; Sony Latin
- Members: Wisin; Yandel
- Website: laultimamision.com

Wisin & Yandel were a Puerto Rican reggaeton duo consisting of Wisin and Yandel. They started their career in 1998 and stayed together until 2023, winning several awards including a Grammy Award in 2009. They became the first reggaeton artists to win one. In late 2013, they announced they would take a pause in their career as a duo, after their Líderes Tour. In a 2014 interview with People en Español, Yandel confirmed that the group would not be disbanding. In February 2018, following a five-year hiatus, the duo announced they would be reuniting, and were set to embark on a world tour, as well as release new music. They sold over 15 million records.

In 2022 at the BMI Latin Awards, the duo received the BMI President's award. Later that year, Rolling Stone described them as one of the most respected and long-lasting teams in reggaeton.

== History ==
=== Beginning (1998–2004) ===
In 1998, Wisin & Yandel participated in the album No Fear 3, produced by DJ Dicky as well as on the compilation album La Misión Vol. 1, edited by the Fresh Productions label. The success of this collection (which was certified gold) led the label to produce Los Reyes del Nuevo Milenio, the first album by Wisin & Yandel.

From that moment the duo started a successful career. They continued posting new topics in the successive editions of La Misión and recorded three new albums: De Nuevos a Viejos (2001), Mi Vida... My Life (2003) and De Otra Manera (2004), all of which were certified gold. The duo also received the Tu Música Award for Best Rap/Reggaeton Duo in 2002.

In 2004, the duo released two separate solo efforts: El Sobreviviente by Wisin and Quien Contra Mí by Yandel, which sparked speculation about a possible separation. Sales of the albums were unimpressive, and the duo remained together.

=== Pa'l Mundo and WY Records (2005–2006) ===
The duo started their own label under the name of WY Records. In 2005, they released their first album under it, titled Pa'l Mundo, which became their most successful to date. The record reached international status when it reached countries like China, Japan and some European countries. The album also peaked at #1 on Billboard's Top Latin Albums and was certified gold by RIAA. After the success of Pa'l Mundo, Wisin & Yandel released Los Vaqueros in 2006, which featured appearances of WY Records artists like Franco "El Gorila", Tony Dize, and Yomille Omar, as well as guest artists like Don Omar and Héctor el Father.

=== International consolidation (2007–2012) ===
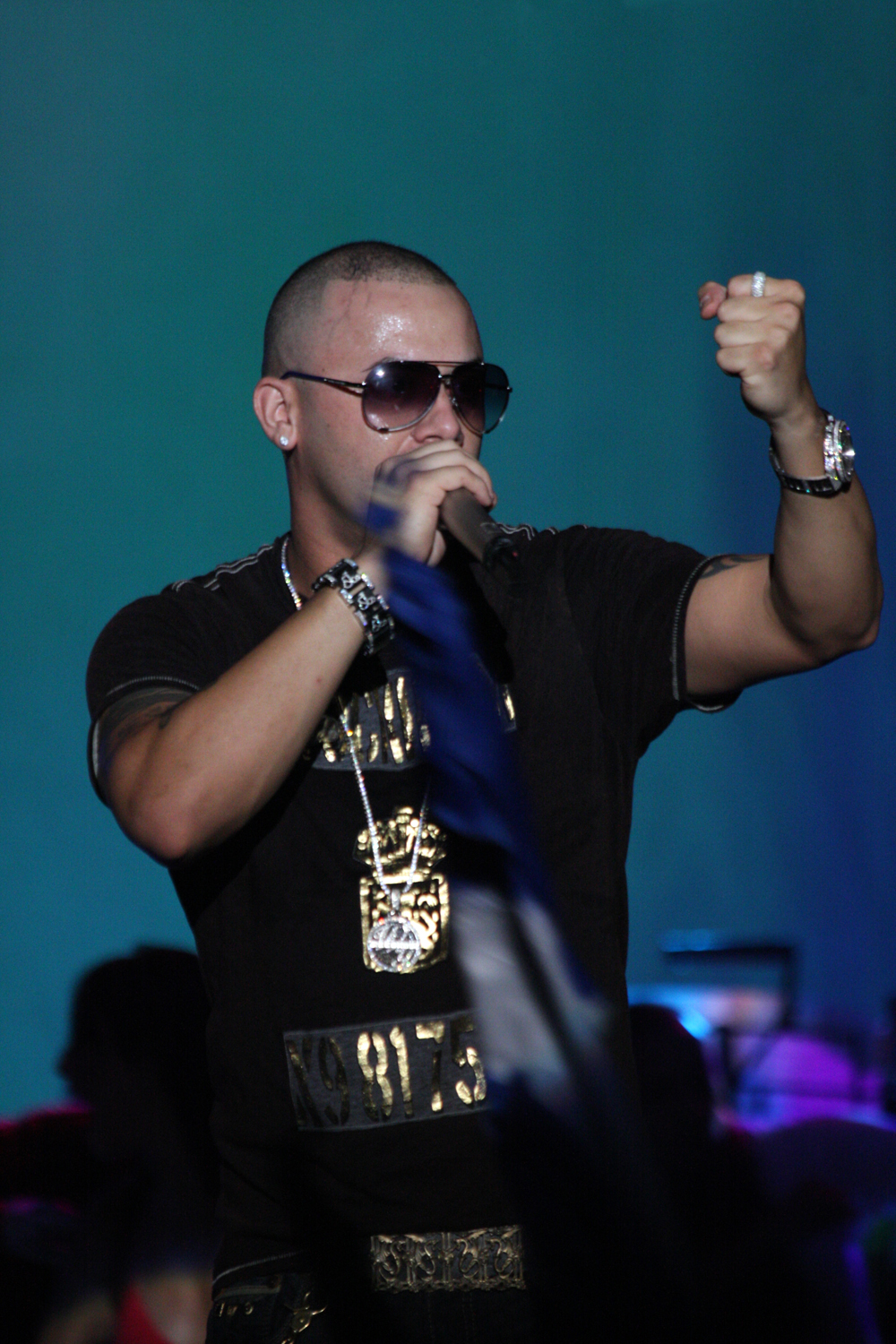
Wisin performing

On November 7, 2007, Wisin & Yandel released the album Los Extraterrestres, which featured collaborations with international artists like Eve and Fat Joe. The album was received positively by the Puerto Rican media, with mainstream newspaper Primera Hora awarding it a score of 4 out of 5. The review praised the fusion of styles found in the album, claiming that the production continued the "musical evolution" found in its predecessors.

Following the release of Los Extraterrestres the duo commenced an international promotional tour. After organizing concerts throughout Latin America and Europe, Wisin & Yandel noted that they would like to expand their markets to Africa and Australia. Wisin & Yandel participated in the closing ceremonies of the 2008 Viña del Mar Festival. The tickets for the event sold out, which the duo described as a "real honor". On June 2, 2008, the duo began a tour to promote Wisin vs. Yandel: Los Extraterrestres, Otra Dimensión, visiting several radio stations in Puerto Rico.

In June 2008, Wisin & Yandel participated in the 2008 edition of New York City's Puerto Rican Day Parade, organized on June 8, 2008. On June 12, 2008, they traveled to Los Angeles to attend the BMI Latin Awards, in which they received a nomination for Writer of the Year. Later they also received four Juventud Awards. They also made a guest appearance in an album titled Caribbean Connection released on June 24, 2008. The production featured several Latin American artists including Daddy Yankee, Don Omar and Héctor el Father along Jamaican musicians like Inner Circle, Bounty Killer, Elephant Man and Wayne Wonder.

On July 19, 2008, the duo made a presentation before a sold-out crowd in Venezuela. The duet were selected to perform in "KQ Live Concert" on September 27, 2008, organized by KQ 105 FM, which included several Puerto Rican and Latin American artists. On August 12, 2008, the mayor of their hometown of Cayey, Rolando Ortíz Velázquez, recognized Wisin & Yandel as "Ambassadors from Cayey to the world" during the city's annual Fiesta patronal. On April 24, 2009, Wisin & Yandel received the Latin Rhythm Album of the Year, Duo or Group Latin Billboard Music Award for Los Extraterresres. Besides this recognition, the duo also received nominations for "Ahora Es" and "Síguelo" in the Tropical Airplay Song of the Year, Duo or Group and Latin Rhythm Airplay Song of the Year, Duo or Group categories.

In May 2009, Wisin & Yandel released their next album La Revolución, which featured rapper 50 Cent. Like their previous album, it peaked at #1 on Billboard's Top Latin Albums. On October 15, 2009, Wisin & Yandel won the Latin American MTV Award for "Artist of the Year" and "Video of the Year". In 2011, the duo released Los Vaqueros: El Regreso which peaked at #1 on several charts.

In April 2012, the duo announced that they will be the opening act for Spanish singer Enrique Iglesias and American artist Jennifer Lopez at the Enrique Iglesias and Jennifer Lopez in Concert but later decided to opt out on June 29, 2012. Their album Líderes has a release date of July 3, 2012. Wisin & Yandel have both decided to release solo albums in 2013. Wisin's "El Regreso del Sobreviviente" was released on March 18, 2014. Yandel's "De Lider a Leyenda" was released on November 5, 2013.

Wisin & Yandel were coaches in the third season of La Voz... México.

=== Hiatus and solo careers (late 2013–2017) ===
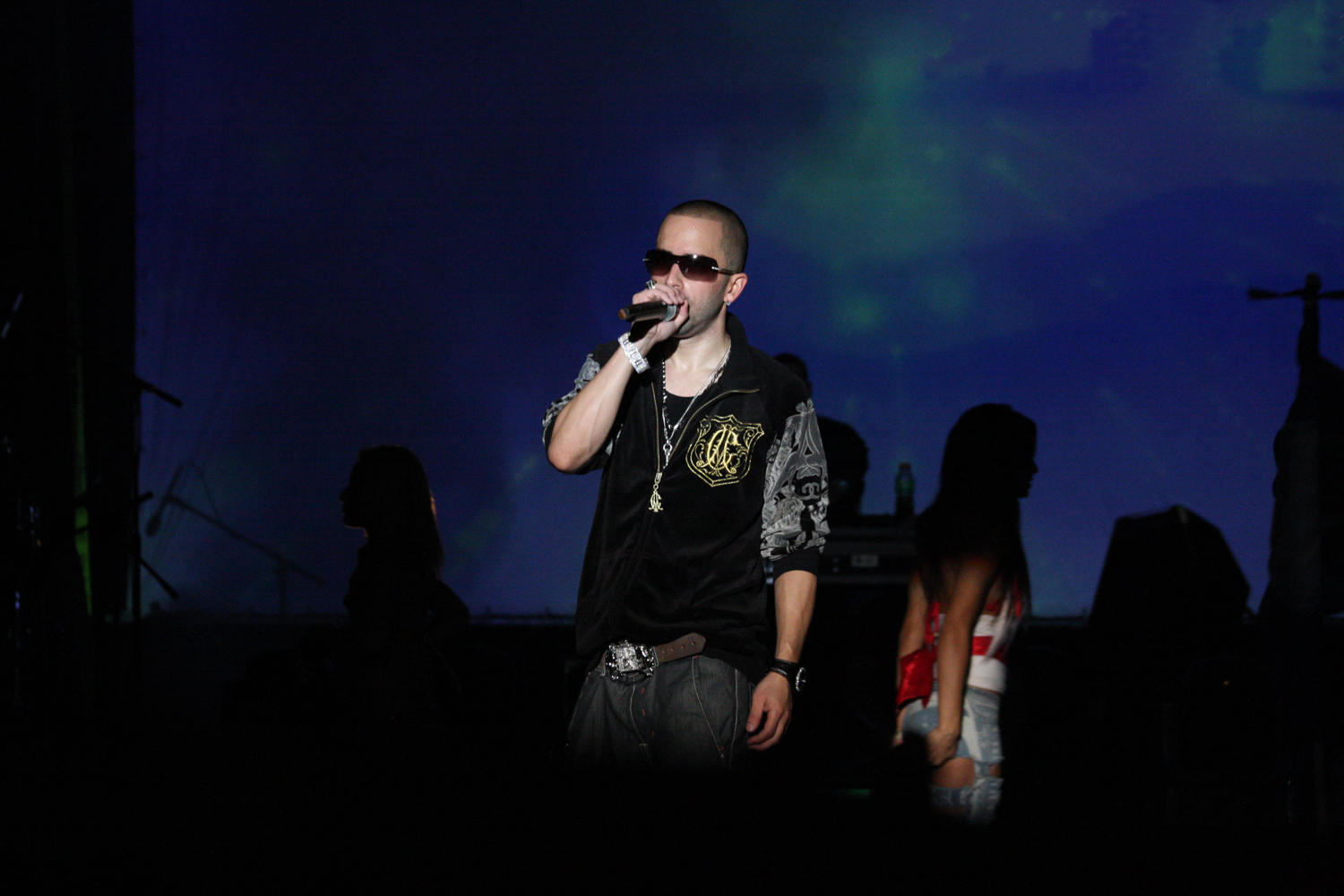
Yandel performing

In November 2013, after the Líderes Tour, the dúo went into hiatus, causing rumors to arise about their split, saying it was because of differences between them. Yandel denied such claims, assuring fans that they have not disbanded. In early April 2014, Wisin said on Radio Fórmula: "I think that late 2015 or 2016 we're ready with a new album as Wisin & Yandel – This is just a facet; it's a pause to refresh ourselves to make something different." Later in August 2014, Yandel said: "Wisin & Yandel is a registered trademark, we always work together – We are now providing separate projects, we'll soon be seen together again."

Wisin completed his second solo album, El Regreso del Sobreviviente in 2013, releasing it in 2014. Meanwhile, Yandel made his first solo tour and promoted his second solo album De Líder a Leyenda around the same time period. In September 2014, they both confirmed they were working on a new track that would premiere and be performed for the first time on Yandel's De Líder a Leyenda tour on October 4, at the José Miguel Agrelot Coliseum in San Juan, Puerto Rico.

Beginning in 2017, the two have made collaborations for each other in a couple of songs. On September 8, 2017, Yandel released the single "Como Antes" from his new album featuring Wisin, which came after their long-awaited return as a duo. On November 24, 2017, Wisin featured Yandel and Daddy Yankee in "Todo Comienza en la Disco".

=== Reunion, Los Campeones del Pueblo, La Última Misión, and their last tour (2018–2023) ===
In February 2018, the duo announced their reunion from their hiatus. One month later, they announced their first US concert at Madison Square Garden. The concert, held on June 8, was to celebrate their Puerto Rican heritage. The concert took place during the Puerto Rican Day Parade weekend in New York City. In May 2018, Wisin & Yandel announced on their Instagram a concert for November 30, 2018, at the José Miguel Agrelot Coliseum in Puerto Rico. The show sold out quickly and resulted in the addition of more shows – the duo ended up having 8 back to back shows at this venue.

On October 25, 2018, they released "Reggaetón en lo Oscuro" as the lead single from their upcoming tenth studio album. On December 14, they released their latest album Los Campeones del Pueblo which features collaborations with many artists including Ozuna, Maluma, and Bad Bunny. At the same time, they released two compilation albums Como en los Tiempos de Antes and Juntos Otra Vez.

In March 2022, the duo announced La Última Misión World Tour, with the imaginary friend Balon Rocop, which was their final tour as a duo and coincided with their tenth and final studio album La Última Misión. The album features collaborations with many artists including Ozuna, Rosalía, J Balvin, Jennifer Lopez, and Prince Royce.

== Members ==
- Juan Luis Alberto Morera Luna (Wisin), born December 19, 1978 (age 47), is from Cayey, Puerto Rico.
- Llandel Veguilla Malavé Salazar (Yandel), born January 14, 1977 (age 49), also from Cayey.

== Discography ==
=== Studio albums ===
- 2000: Los Reyes del Nuevo Milenio
- 2001: De Nuevos a Viejos
- 2002: De Otra Manera
- 2005: Pa'l Mundo
- 2007: Wisin vs. Yandel: Los Extraterrestres
- 2009: La Revolución
- 2011: Los Vaqueros: El Regreso
- 2012: Líderes
- 2018: Los Campeones del Pueblo "The Big Leagues"
- 2022: La Última Misión
- TBA "W&Y"

=== Live albums ===
- 2007: Tomando Control: Live
- 2010: La Revolución: Live
- 2014: Wisin & Yandel (En Vivo)

=== Compilation albums ===
- 2003: Mi Vida... My Life
- 2006: Los Vaqueros
- 2007: Los Vaqueros Wild Wild Mixes
- 2008: La Mente Maestra
- 2009: El Dúo de la Historia Vol. 1
- 2010: Lo Mejor De La Compañía
- 2018: Como En Los Tiempos de Antes (DJ mix)
- 2018: Juntos Otra Vez

=== Solo albums ===
==== Wisin ====
- 2004: El Sobreviviente
- 2014: El Regreso del Sobreviviente
- 2015: Los Vaqueros: La Trilogía
- 2017: Victory
- 2021: Los Legendarios 001
- 2022: Multimillo, Vol. 1
- 2024: Mr. W
- 2025: El Sobreviviente WWW

==== Yandel ====
- 2003: Quien Contra Mí
- 2013: De Líder a Leyenda
- 2015: Dangerous
- 2017: Update
- 2019: The One
- 2020: Quien Contra Mí 2
- 2023: Resistencia
- 2024: Elyte

== Concert tours ==
- Pa'l Mundo Tour (2006–2007)
- Los Vaqueros Tour (2007)
- Los Extraterrestres World Tour (2008–2009)
- La Revolución World Tour (2009–2010)
- Los Vaqueros: El Regreso World Tour (2011)
- Los Lideres World Tour (2012)
- Como Antes Tour (2018–2019)
- La Última Misión World Tour (2022-2023)

== See also ==
- List of best-selling Latin music artists
