= Yandel 150 =

2022 single by Yandel and Feid

Single by Yandel and Feid

from the album Resistencia
- Language: Spanish
- Released: December 20, 2022
- Genre: Reggaeton
- Length: 3:37
- Label: Y; Sony Latin
- Songwriter: Joan Manuel Ubiñas Jiménez • Joan Esteban Espinosa Cuervo • Andrés David Restrepo • Llandel Veguilla Malave • Salomón Villada
- Producers: Jowan; Rolo

Yandel singles chronology
"Delincuente" (2022)	"Yandel 150" (2022)	"Poropopompón" (2023)

Feid singles chronology
"XQ Te Pones Así" (2022)	"Yandel 150" (2022)	"Remix Exclusivo" (2023)

Music video
- "Yandel 150" on YouTube

"Yandel 150" is a reggaeton song by Puerto Rican singer Yandel and Colombian singer Feid, from the former's seventh studio album, Resistencia (2023). It was released on December 20, 2022, under Y Entertainment and Sony Music Latin. It was written by Feid, Yandel, Fantakuko, Rolo, Jowan and Wain, as well as produced by the latter three.

== Background ==
"Yandel 150" marks the second collaboration between Yandel and Feid, after "Xq Te Pones Así" (2022). They have also shared in the composition of "Ginza (remix)" (2015) by J Balvin, where they also participate Yandel, Farruko, Nicky Jam, De La Ghetto, Daddy Yankee, Zion and Arcángel.

== Lyrics ==
"Yandel 150" it is introduced by the first chords as a heartbreak song. The lyrics imply that it is dedicated to a woman who works in a nightclub, but it is impossible to engage in a conversation with her because of her profession. This composition is similar to their previous collaboration "XQ Te Pones Así" and could be considered as a continuation.

== Commercial performance ==
In the United States, "Yandel 150" topped the Billboard Latin Rhythm Airplay chart in its ninth week and the Latin Airplay chart in its eleventh week, dated April 15, 2023. On the Latin Airplay chart, it gives Yandel his fifteenth number one, after "Déjà Vu" (2021), while Feid earned his third number one after "Hey Mor" (2022). On Latin Rhythm Airplay, the song is Yandel's fifteenth number one and Feid's fourth. It also debuted at number 96 on the Billboard Hot 100 dated February 18, 2023, later peaking at number 71 on April 1, 2023.

In Spain, it peaked at number 2 and was certified 2× platinum by PROMUSICAE. In Latin America, it led the charts in Bolivia, Chile, Colombia, Ecuador, and Peru, while it entered the top ten in Argentina, Costa Rica, El Salvador, Honduras, Nicaragua, Panama, and Paraguay.

== Music video ==
The music video was released on December 20, 2022.

== Charts ==
=== Weekly charts ===
Chart performance for "Yandel 150"
Chart (2022–2023)	Peak position
Global 200 (Billboard)	13
Spain (Promusicae)	2
US Billboard Hot 100	71
US Hot Latin Songs (Billboard)	6

=== Year-end charts ===
Year-end chart performance for "Yandel 150"
Chart (2023)	Position
Global 200 (Billboard)	53
US Hot Latin Songs (Billboard)	17

== Certifications ==
Certifications for "Yandel 150"
Region	Certification	Certified units/sales
Portugal (AFP)	Gold	5,000^{‡}
Spain (Promusicae)	7× Platinum	420,000^{‡}
United States (RIAA)	3× Platinum (Latin)	180,000^{‡}
^{‡} Sales+streaming figures based on certification alone.

== Remix version ==
"Yankee 150"

Single by Yandel, Feid and Daddy Yankee
- Language: Spanish
- Released: June 15, 2023
- Genre: Reggaeton
- Length: 4:03
- Label: Y; Sony Latin
- Songwriters: Llandel Veguilla; Salomón Villada; Ramón Luis Ayala Rodríguez; Joan Ubinas; Andrés Restrepo; Johan Espinoza; Esteban Higuita; Justin Quiles
- Producers: Jowan; Rolo; Wain

Yandel singles chronology
"Cuando Te Toca" (2023)	"Yankee 150" (2023)	"Juego" (2023)

Feid singles chronology
"Polaris" (remix) (2023)	"Yankee 150" (2023)	"La Baby" (2023)

Daddy Yankee singles chronology
"Beachy" (2023)	"Yankee 150" (2023)	"La Baby" (2023)

Music video
- "Yankee 150" on YouTube

A remixed version was released on June 15, 2023, featuring Puerto Rican singer and rapper Daddy Yankee. The title of the song "Yankee 150" is a tribute to the artist.. It was written by the three said artists, Jowan, Rolo, Wain, Fantakuka, and Justin Quiles and produced by Rolo, Jowan, and Wain.

The song marks their first collaboration between the three of them, and Daddy Yankee had previously worked on other previous Yandel songs, and between Feid and Daddy Yankee it marks their first collaboration.

=== Critical reception ===
Laura Coca of Spanish radio station Los 40 gave the song a positive review, highlighting Daddy Yankee as a "talent" and that he "brings some unmistakable verses and a catchy beat". He also predicted that the theme "is going to become the theme of the dance floors this summer" although "there are many artists who bring out their musical arsenal in the weeks before the hottest time of the year begins."

Lucía Castillo from the Spanish newspaper Okdiario also positively reviewed the remix, noting that it "maintains the essence of the original song", but that "the presence of Daddy Yankee takes this song to another level". In the same way, the Peruvian radio station Moda highlighted that "it maintains the same dynamics and essence that made the original hit such a success."

The Argentine newspaper Crónica published that "the addition of Daddy Yankee's verses exploits the full potential of a hit with which they already speculate if it will not be 'the theme of the summer' in the northern hemisphere". The Ecuadorian television station Ecuavisa, through an article on its website, indicated that "it promises to be one of the best songs of 2023" and "that Feid is in the cast makes the product even more popular".

On the other hand, according to the Spanish newspaper Diario de Avisos, the song disappointed the public, being criticized mainly for the "substitution of some of the favorite parts of the original song to add to the reggaeton legend (Daddy Yankee)" and that "the part in which (the) new star Feid appears has been moved to the end of the song". Also, some of the fans who were dissatisfied posted their opinions on Twitter, which turned the topic of the song's release into a trending topic.

=== Commercial performance ===
In the United States, "Yankee 150" peaked at number 33 on Billboard's Hot Latin Songs chart. In Argentina it debuted and peaked at number 75 on the Billboard Argentina Hot 100. In the rest of Latin America it reached the top twenty-five in Chile, Colombia and Ecuador. In Europe it charted at number 45 in Spain.

=== Music video ===
The music video was released on June 15, 2023.

=== Charts ===
Chart performance for "Yankee 150"
Chart (2023)	Peak position
Global 200 (Billboard)	177
Spain (Promusicae)	45
US Hot Latin Songs (Billboard)	33

=== Certifications ===
Certifications for "Yankee 150"
Region	Certification	Certified units/sales
Spain (Promusicae)	Gold	30,000^{‡}
United States (RIAA)	2× Platinum (Latin)	120,000^{‡}
^{‡} Sales+streaming figures based on certification alone.
