= Mi Vida... My Life =

Compilation album by Wisin & Yandel
- Released: October 21, 2003
- Recorded: 2003
- Genre: Reggaeton
- Length: 1:08:00
- Label: Lideres Entertainment Group
- Producers: Luny Tunes; DJ Blass; Echo

Wisin & Yandel chronology
De Otra Manera (2002)	Mi Vida... My Life (2003)	Pa'l Mundo (2005)

Singles from Mi Vida... My Life
- 1. "Guáyale El Mahón" Released: 2003; 2. "Esta Noche Hay Pelea" Released: 2003

Mi Vida... My Life is the first compilation album by Puerto Rican reggaeton duo Wisin & Yandel, released on October 21, 2003, by Lideres Entertainment Group. Two editions were released with two different covers. The second edition featured bonus music videos. This album contains three new songs and an intro, while the rest are songs from other reggaeton albums.

== Track listing ==
No.	Title	Producer(s)	Length
1.	"Intro"		1:09
2.	"Guáyale El Mahón"		2:26
3.	"Esta Noche Hay Pelea"	Luny Tunes	2:48
4.	"Tú Sabes"		2:36
5.	"Dembow (from La Misión III)"	DJ Blass	2:58
6.	"No Fear 3"	DJ Dicky	2:37
7.	"Girla (from Los Reyes del Nuevo Milenio)"		3:09
8.	"Con Mi Reggae Muero"	DJ Blass	3:35
9.	"Boricua NY 1"		2:22
10.	"La Sata (from De Nuevos a Viejos)"		3:24
11.	"La Misión"		2:39
12.	"Pégate (from De Nuevos a Viejos"		2:47
13.	"Reggae Rockeao (from De Otra Manera)"		1:33
14.	"Dile (from Los Reyes del Nuevo Milenio)"		3:34
15.	"Quiero Verte Bailar"		2:35
16.	"Ola (from De Otra Manera)"		2:39
17.	"Algo Pasó (from De Otra Manera)"		2:18
18.	"La Rockera (from De Nuevos a Viejos)"		2:37
19.	"En Busca De Ti (from De Nuevos a Viejos)"		2:48
20.	"Compláceme (from De Nuevos a Viejos)"		3:08
21.	"La Misión 2"		2:49
22.	"No Sé (from De Otra Manera)"	Luny Tunes	2:24
23.	"Pena (from Los Reyes del Nuevos Milenio)"		3:25
24.	"Piden Perreo (from De Otra Manera)" (featuring Alexis & Fido)	Luny Tunes	3:22
25.	"La Vaquera (from La Misión III)"		3:00
Total length:			1:08:00

Bonus Track
No.	Title	Length
26.	"Guáyale El Mahón" (Music Videos)	2:12
27.	"Esta Noche Hay Pelea" (Music Videos)	1:55
Total length:		4:07

=== My Life: The Movie ===
On March 22, 2005, the duo released a compilation album titled Mi Vida: La Película (English: My Life: The Movie). It contained 9 tracks and a DVD of a movie with the same name. The film was based on the early days of their music careers.

== Charts ==
Chart (2003)	Peak position
US Latin Pop Albums (Billboard)	19
US Top Latin Albums (Billboard)	56
