= Fronteamos Porque Podemos =

Single by De la Ghetto featuring Daddy Yankee, Yandel and Ñengo Flow
- Language: Spanish
- English title: "We Confront Because We Can"
- Released: August 28, 2015
- Genre: Latin trap
- Length: 5:15
- Label: Latin Nation
- Songwriters: Edwin Rosa Vásquez; Llandel Veguilla Malavé; Marcos Masís Fernández; Rafael Castillo; Ramón Ayala Rodríguez
- Producers: Tainy; Nely el Arma Secreta

De la Ghetto singles chronology
"La Súper Chapiadora" (remix 2) (2015)	"Fronteamos Porque Podemos" (2015)	"Bailen" (remix) (2015)

Daddy Yankee singles chronology
"Tumba la Casa" (remix) (2015)	"Fronteamos Porque Podemos" (2015)	"Estás Aquí" (2015)

Yandel singles chronology
"Al Bailar" (2015)	"Fronteamos Porque Podemos" (2015)	"Calentura" (trap edition) (2015)

Ñengo Flow singles chronology
"Tumba la Casa" (remix) (2015)	"Fronteamos Porque Podemos" (2015)	"Gatilleros" (remix) (2015)

Music video
- "Fronteamos Porque Podemos" on YouTube

"Fronteamos Porque Podemos" (English: "We Confront Because We Can") is a song by American singer De la Ghetto featuring Puerto Rican singers Daddy Yankee, Yandel and Ñengo Flow. It was released as a single on August 28, 2015, through Latin Nation Entertainment.

== Reception ==
Spanish radio station Happy FM describes "Fronteamos Porque Podemos" as one of the "collaborations with which De la Ghetto has made history" and one of the "bombs that accompanied the emerging Latin trap movement." It also highlighted De la Ghetto's interpretation as a "more leisurely style, although it continues with the theme of the song, which his colleagues interpret with more intense bars."

== Audio visualizer ==
The audio visual for "Fronteamos Porque Podemos" was published on De la Ghetto's YouTube channel on August 28, 2015, simultaneously with the single.

== Music video ==
The music video for "Fronteamos Porque Podemos" was published on De la Ghetto's YouTube channel on October 27, 2015. It was directed by Christian Suau.

== Certifications ==
Certifications and sales for "Fronteamos Porque Podemos"
Region	Certification	Certified units/sales
United States (RIAA)	Platinum (Latin)	60,000^{‡}
^{‡} Sales+streaming figures based on certification alone.
