= De Otra Manera =

Studio album by Wisin & Yandel
- Released: August 14, 2002
- Recorded: 2001–2002
- Genre: Reggaeton
- Length: 39:41
- Label: Fresh Productions
- Producer: DJ Blass; Echo; Luny Tunes (credited as Looney Tones)

Wisin & Yandel chronology
De Nuevos a Viejos (2001)	De Otra Manera (2002)	Mi Vida... My Life (2003)

Singles from De Otra Manera
- 1. "Hola" Released: 2002; 2. "Reggae Rockeao" Released: 2002; 3. "Piden Perreo" Released: 2002

De Otra Manera (English: In Another Way) is the third studio album by Puerto Rican reggaeton duo Wisin & Yandel, released on August 14, 2002, by then independent label Lideres Entertainment Group.

== Track listing ==
No.	Title	Length
1.	"La Trova"	2:33
2.	"Algo Pasó"	2:19
3.	"Salgo Filoteau" (featuring Divino & Baby Ranks)	2:59
4.	"Reggae Rockeao"	1:34
5.	"Hola"	2:39
6.	"Abusadora" (Wisin featuring Fido)	2:12
7.	"¿Por Qué Me Peleas?"	2:28
8.	"Piden Perreo" (featuring Alexis & Fido)	3:24
9.	"Compláceme"	3:08
10.	"No Sé"	2:25
11.	"Tarzan"	2:25
12.	"La Fanática"	3:47
13.	"Toma Perreo"	1:54
14.	"Sedúceme" (Yandel featuring Alexis)	2:04
15.	"De Otra Manera"	3:46
Total length:		39:41

== Charts ==
Chart (2002)	Peak position
Mexican Albums (AMPROFON)	20
