= Quién Contra Mí 2 =

Studio album by Yandel
- Released: July 31, 2020
- Label: Y; Sony Latin
- Producer: Yandel (exec.); Blind; Cozy; DJ Blass; DJ Luian; DJ Sonic; DVLP; Earcandy; Ecby; El Ke Retumba; George Noriega; Hydro; Jowny Boom Boom; Jumbo; Kano the Monster; Los Harmonicos; Luny; Mambo Kingz; Mikey Tone; Neneto; Nesty; OMG; Play-N-Skillz; Rec808; Reggie el Autentico; Saga WhiteBlack; Voxhel; Sour; The Ironix

Yandel chronology
The One (2019)	Quién Contra Mí 2 (2020)	Dynasty (2021)

Singles from Quien Contra Mí 2
- 1. "Espionaje" Released: April 3, 2020; 2. "No Te Vayas" Released: July 31, 2020; 3. "Dembow 2020" Released: July 31, 2020; 4. "Ella Entendio" Released: October 15, 2020

Quién Contra Mí 2 is the sixth studio album by Puerto Rican singer and songwriter Yandel. It was released on July 31, 2020, by Y Entertainment and Sony Music Latin. The album contains 22 songs with features from 28 guests, including J Balvin, Rubén Blades, and Snoop Dogg, among others. The album serves as the sequel to Yandel's debut album, Quien Contra Mí, and nearly approaches the 17th anniversary.

== Background ==
Yandel commented on the process of the album, by saying,

"The idea of creating Quien Contra Mi 2 arose during the quarantine. When all this started, I had many songs recorded and in a conversation with Andy, my manager, I told him that I missed that contact with my colleagues in music so much. But inside everything I was full of hope and a lot of positivity and that attitude reminded me a little of the Yandel who at first took so many risks to get ahead. The pandemic has brought so much suffering, irreparable loss, and big changes in the entertainment world. In my case, thank God, this gift of being alive and healthy has prompted me to continue believing in myself, and once again bet on what I have been passionate about for so long: music."

== Track listing ==
Track listing adapted from Tidal.

No.	Title	Writer(s)	Producer(s)	Length
1.	"Quien Contra Mi"	Llandel Malave; Ernesto Padilla; Jose Sanchez	Nesty	3:38
2.	"Dembow 2020" (with Rauw Alejandro)	Llandel Malave; Juan Orengo; Padilla; Jose Collazo; Jorge Pizarro; Raul Ocasio; Eric Rovira	Nesty; DJ Sonic	2:48
3.	"No Te Vayas" (featuring J Balvin)	Llandel Malave; Rafael Aponte; Adrian Veguilla-Espada; Jose Balvin; Felix Eickhoff; Omar Garcia; Victor Delgado; Simon Reichardt; Francisco Saldaña	The Ironix; Luny; Sour; OMG; Predikador^{[a]}	3:48
4.	"Diablo En Mujer" (with Myke Towers and Natti Natasha featuring Darell)	Osval Castro; Natalia Gutierrez; Luian Malave; Edgar Semper-Vargas; Xavier Semper-Vargas; Kedin Maysonet; Pablo Fuentes; Rafael Salcedo; Michael Monge; Llandel Malave	DJ Luian; Mambo Kingz; Neneto; BF^{[a]}	5:04
5.	"Por Mi Reggae Muero 2020" (with Anuel AA)	Llandel Malave; Emmanuel Gazmey; Luian Malave; E. Semper-Vargas; X. Semper-Vargas; Fuentes; Salcedo; Vladimir Velazquez	DJ Luian; Mambo Kingz; DJ Blass; Neneto^{[a]}	3:35
6.	"Fama" (with Snoop Dogg and Rubén Blades)	Llandel Malave; Veguilla-Espada; Eduardo Gonzalez; Calvin Broadus; Ronald Alvarez	Sour	3:11
7.	"Ponme al Dia" (with Jhay Cortez)	Llandel Malave; Roberto Vazquez; Jesus Cortez; Carlos Briceno; Brigram Zayas; Jose Tousaint	DVLP; Cozy; Earcandy	4:14
8.	"Ella Entendio" (with Farruko and Arcángel)	Llandel Malave; Austin Santos; Joan Jimenez; Padilla; Carlos Correa; Franklin Martinez; Marco Perez; Andy Bauza	Nesty	4:00
9.	"Se Viste y Se Maquilla" (with Ozuna)	Llandel Malave; Juan Rosado; Luian Malave; E. Semper-Vargas; X. Semper-Vargas; Maysonet; Fuentes	DJ Luian; Mambo Kingz; Jowny Boom Boom; BF^{[a]}	3:07
10.	"Actua" (with Ñengo Flow and Kevvo)	Llandel Malave; Edwin Ortiz; Eduardo Berrios; Gabriel Lebron; Audberto Duprey; Kevin Allende; Pedro Quintana	Los Harmonicos	4:46
11.	"Celda" (with Manuel Turizo)	Llandel Malave; David Lozada; Manuel Zapata; Juan Medina; Saldaña; Omar Garcia; Victor Delgado	Luny; OMG; Predikador^{[a]}	3:58
12.	"No Te Soltare" (with Nicky Jam)	Llandel Malave; Nick Caminero; Juan Medina; Cristhian Mena; German Tortolero; Victor Moore	Saga WhiteBlack; Jumbo	3:41
13.	"Que Vas Hacer" (featuring Maluma)	Llandel Malave; Vazquez; Juan Arias; Briceno; Zayas; Tousaint	DVLP; Cozy; Earcandy	4:16
14.	"Se Me Olvido" (with Zion & Lennox)	Llandel Malave; Felix Ortiz; Gabriel Pizarro; Joan Jimenez; Gabriel Lebron; Audberto Duprey; Angel Sanchez	Los Harmonicos; Blind	3:05
15.	"Subconsciente" (with Lunay)	Veguilla-Espada; Michael Delgado; Joan Jimenez; Jefnier Osorio-Moreno; Gabriel Quintero; Llandel Malave	Sour; Mikey Tone; Luny; OMG; Predikador^{[a]}	3:47
16.	"Hasta Abajo Le Doy" (with Nio García and Brray featuring Juanka and Catalyna)	Llandel Malave; Bryan Quiñones; Luian Malave; Maysonet; Fuentes; Luis Garcia; Catalina Garcia; Juan Bauza; X. Semper-Vargas; E. Semper-Vargas	Jowny Boom Boom; DJ Luian; Mambo Kingz	4:58
17.	"El Gusto" (with Dalex)	Llandel Malave; Veguilla-Espada; Aponte; Francisco Saldaña; Gabriel Morales; Pedro Daleccio	Sour	3:41
18.	"Ilegal" (with Omy De Oro)	Llandel Malave; Denis Rivera; Eric Encarnacion; Carlos Ruiz; Marcello Pastuizaca; Raul Badillo; Martin Vicente	Kano the Monster; Ecby	3:10
19.	"Concierto Privado" (with Pedro Capó)	Llandel Malave; Pedro Sosa; Frank Santofimio; Aponte; Juan Vazquez	Rec808; George Noriega; Reggie el Autentico; El Ke Retumba	4:13
20.	"Eva" (with Jay Wheeler)	Llandel Malave; Jose Martinez; Luian Malave; X. Semper-Vargas; E. Semper-Vargas; Fuentes; Salcedo; Wander Mendez; Hector Ramos	Hydro; DJ Luian; Mambo Kingz; Santo Niño^{[a]}; BF^{[a]}	3:28
21.	"Fiesta y Rumba" (with El Alfa)	Llandel Malave; Eduardo Gonzalez; Juan Salinas; Oscar Salinas; David Macias; Gary Walker; Emanuel Batista	Play-N-Skillz; Scott Summers^{[a]}	3:10
22.	"Espionaje"	Llandel Malave; Padilla; Eduardo Berrios; Vazquez	Nesty	3:37

Notes

- ^{^[a]} signifies a co-producer
- ^{^[b]} signifies an additional producer

Sample Credits

- "Dembow 2020" contains a sample of "Dembow", performed by Yandel.
- "Por Mi Reggae Muero 2020" contains a sample of "Por Mi Reggae Muero", performed by Wisin & Yandel.

== Charts ==
=== Weekly charts ===
Weekly chart performance for Quien Contra Mí 2
Chart (2020)	Peak position
Spanish Albums (PROMUSICAE)	12
US Billboard 200	118
US Top Latin Albums (Billboard)	3
US Latin Rhythm Albums (Billboard)	3

=== Year-end charts ===
Year-end chart performance for Quien Contra Mí 2
Chart (2020)	Position
US Top Latin Albums (Billboard)	62

== Certifications ==
Certifications for Quien Contra Mí 2
Region	Certification	Certified units/sales
United States (RIAA)	Platinum (Latin)	60,000^{‡}
^{‡} Sales+streaming figures based on certification alone.
