= Elyte =

Studio album by Yandel
- Released: October 10, 2024
- Genre: Reggaeton
- Length: 54:42
- Language: Spanish
- Labels: La Leyenda; Warner Latina
- Producers: Nesty; Jowan; Sour; Hydra; Feniko; Dynell; Legazzy; Tainy; Ghetto; D. Tenox; Botlok; Blox; Ironix; JS Beatz; Roberto Vázquez; The Beatllionare; Yannc Full Harmony; Luis Enrique Acosta Arraga

Yandel chronology
Manifesting 20-05 (2024)	Elyte (2024)	Infinito (2026)

Singles from Elyte
- 1. "Borracho y Loco" Released: September 21, 2023; 2. "Click" Released: November 30, 2023; 3. "Karma" Released: January 13, 2024; 4. "Caserío" Released: March 7, 2024; 5. "Con Co" Released: June 6, 2024; 6. "Afro" Released: July 18, 2024; 7. "Háblame Claro" Released: September 12, 2024; 8. "Capítulo" Released: October 14, 2024; 9. "Máquina" Released: October 18, 2024

Elyte is the ninth studio album by Puerto Rican singer-songwriter Yandel. It was released on October 10, 2024, through La Leyenda LLC and Warner Music Latina. Contains appearances by Luar la L, Tego Calderón, Myke Towers, Saiko, Farruko, J Balvin, Maldy, Blessd, Brray, Feid and Jay Wheeler.

== Background and release ==
Following the release of his eighth studio album, Resistencia, and his EP with Feid, Manifesting 20-05, Yandel continued to release more singles.

On September 18, 2024, Yandel announced the title of his upcoming ninth studio album, which would be called Elyte. At the beginning of October, the singer revealed the track-list and collaborations for the album.

== Singles ==
The debut single from this album, "Borracho y Loco" featuring compatriot singer-songwriter Myke Towers, was released on September 21, 2023. Its predecessor, "Click" with fellow Puerto Rican Luar la L, was released on November 30.

On January 13, 2024, the third single, "Karma", was released to "celebrate his birthday". Later, the fourth single "Caserío" with Spanish singer Saiko, was released on March 8. On June 6, the fifth single "Con Co" was released. It was followed by "Afro" released a month later on July 18. On September 12, the seventh single "Háblame Claro" was released in collaboration with singer Feid. In addition, they had collaborated on other songs such as "Yandel 150" and on their collaborative EP Manifesting 20-05.

Following the release of the album, more singles have also been released, such as the eighth single, "Capítulo", on October 14, and the ninth single "Máquina" in collaboration with the Puerto Rican singers Brray and Maldy, released just four days later, on October 18.

== Track listing ==
Elyte track listing
No.	Title	Writer(s)	Producer(s)	Length
1.	"Puño de Tito"	Ángel Gabriel Figueroa; Christopher López; Llandel Veguilla Malavé; Nikita Antonovich Komrakov; Pavel Vasilev; Robert Abner Rodríguez; Samuel Serrano	Feniko; The Beatllionare	2:12
2.	"Capítulo"	Llandel Veguilla Malavé; Eduardo Alfonso Vargas Berrios; Roberto Vázquez; Starlin Bienvenido Rivas	Dynell; Legazzy; Roberto Vázquez	2:43
3.	"Reggaetón Malandro" (with Tego Calderón)	Eduardo González; Ernesto Padilla; Llandel Veguilla Malavé	Nesty	2:56
4.	"Old School" (with Farruko)	Axel Rafael Quezada Fulgencio; Carlos Efrén Reyes Rosado; Joan Manuel Ubiñas Jiménez; Llandel Veguilla Malavé	Ghetto	3:05
5.	"La Malota"	Hugo René Sención Sanabria; Jean Carlos Pacheco; Llandel Veguilla Malavé	Hydra	2:40
6.	"Háblame Claro" (with Feid)	Andrés David Restrepo Echavarría; Joan Manuel Ubiñas; Johan Esteban Espinosa Cuervo; Llandel Veguilla Malavé; Marcos Efraín Masís; Salomón Villada Hoyos	Jowan; Tainy	2:35
7.	"Máquina" (with Brray and Maldy)	Bryan García Quiñones; Christian Cintron; Edwin Vázquez Vega; Ernesto Padilla; Llandel Veguilla Malavé; Mr. Raven Torres	Nesty	3:43
8.	"Amanezco" (with Jay Wheeler)	Roberto Vázquez; Andrés Jesé Gavillán Batista; Daniel Tenorio; Elvin Jesús Roubert Rodríguez; José Ángel López Martínez; Juan Daniel Arias; Juan Sebastián Navarro; Llandel Veguilla Malavé; Luis Guillermo Marval Camero	Botlok; D. Tenox; Roberto Vázquez	2:38
9.	"Gafas de Sol"	Hugo René Sención Sanabria; Jean Carlos Pacheco; Llandel Veguilla Malavé	Hydra	3:16
10.	"Afterparty" (with J Balvin)	Jeremy Ruíz; Joan Manuel Ubiñas Jiménez; José Álvaro Osorio Balvin; Julián Sánchez Real; Llandel Veguilla Malavé; Roberto Vázquez	JS Beatz; Roberto Vázquez	2:37
11.	"Cuellito"	Adrián Llandel Veguilla Espada; Kevyn Mauricio Cruz Moreno; Llandel Veguilla Malavé; Roberto Vázquez	D. Tenox; Roberto Vázquez; Sour	2:55
12.	"Ganja" (wlth Blessd)	Joan Manuel Ubiñas Jiménez; Julio Manuel González Tavárez; Llandel Veguilla Malavé; Luis Miguel Pardo; Santiago García; Stiven Mesa Londoño	Blow	3:37
13.	"Click" (with Luar la L)	Axel Colón Nieves; Adrián Yandel Veguilla Espada; Christian Clemente Cuevas; Felix Eickhoff; Gabriel Alejandro Rolón; Llandel Veguilla Malavé; Raúl Armando del Valle; Simón Reichardt	Ironix; Sour	3:01
14.	"Keo"	Adrián Llandel Veguilla Espada; Daniel Tenorio; Joan Manuel Ubiñas Jiménez; Llandel Veguilla Malavé; Roberto Vázquez	D. Tenox; Roberto Vázquez; Sour	2:49
15.	"Con Co"	Llandel Veguilla Malavé; David Rivera Juarbe; Jean Carlos Hernández Espinell; Joan Manuel Ubiñas Jiménez; Siggy Vázquez Rodríguez	Yannc Full Harmony	2:07
16.	"Borracho y Loco" (with Myke Towers)	Ernesto Padilla; Joan Manuel Ubiñas Jiménez; José Reyes; Julio Emmanuel Batista Santos; Llandel Veguilla Malavé; Michael Anthony Torres Monge; Orlando Cepeda Matos	Nesty	2:52
17.	"Afro"	Llandel Veguilla Malavé; Andrés David Restrepo Echavarría; Daniel Esteban Taborda; Joan Manuel Ubiñas Jiménez; Johan Esteban Espinosa Cuervo; Santiago García Cataño	Jowan	3:05
18.	"Caserío" (with Saiko)	Daniel Esteban Taborda; Douglas Villasmil Tovar; Johan Esteban Espinosa Cuervo; Llandel Veguilla Malavé; Miguel Cantos Gómez; Santiago García Castaño	Jowan	3:10
19.	"Karma"	Armando Enrique Gutiérrez Bohorquez; Luis Enrique Acosta Arraga; Ricardo Rennier Ontíveros Elmiger; Adrián Llandel Veguilla Espada; Jean Carlos Avellaneda Layton; Joan Manuel Ubiñas Jiménez; Llandel Veguilla Malavé	Luis Enrique Acosta Arraga	2:41
Total length:				54:42

== Charts ==
Chart performance for Elyte
Chart (2024)	Peak position
US Top Latin Albums (Billboard)	38
US Latin Rhythm Albums (Billboard)	15

== Certifications ==
Certifications for Elyte
Region	Certification	Certified units/sales
United States (RIAA)	Gold (Latin)	30,000^{‡}
^{‡} Sales+streaming figures based on certification alone.
