= De Nuevos a Viejos =

De Nuevos A Viejos

Studio album by Wisin & Yandel
- Released: November 13, 2001
- Recorded: 2000–2001
- Genre: Reggaeton
- Length: 36:29
- Label: Fresh Productions
- Producer: DJ Blass; Echo

Wisin & Yandel chronology
Los Reyes del Nuevo Milenio (2000)	De Nuevos A Viejos (2001)	De Otra Manera (2002)

Singles from De Nuevos a Viejos
- 1. "En Busca de Ti" Released: 2001; 2. "Pégate" Released: 2002; 3. "La Rockera" Released: 2002

De Nuevos A Viejos (English: From New to Old) is the second studio album by Wisin & Yandel. It peaked at number 12 on the Billboard Latin Pop Albums chart and number 26 on the Billboard Top Latin Albums chart. This album was nominated for a Latin Billboard Music Award.

== Track listing ==
No.	Title	Length
1.	"Intro"	0:47
2.	"Me Quieren Ver Mal"	3:06
3.	"La Sata"	3:24
4.	"Se Desvelan"	2:28
5.	"Pégate"	2:48
6.	"La Calle"	2:48
7.	"La Rockera"	2:44
8.	"Espejos Negros"	3:06
9.	"Quiero Verte Bailar"	2:36
10.	"Compláceme"	3:09
11.	"En Busca De Ti"	2:50
12.	"Dios No Me Abandones"	2:43
13.	"Sensual Te Ves" (featuring Baby Ranks)	3:56
Total length:		36:28

== Charts ==
Chart (2001)	Peak position
US Latin Pop Albums (Billboard)	12
US Top Latin Albums (Billboard)	26
