= Yandel =

Puerto Rican singer (born 1977)

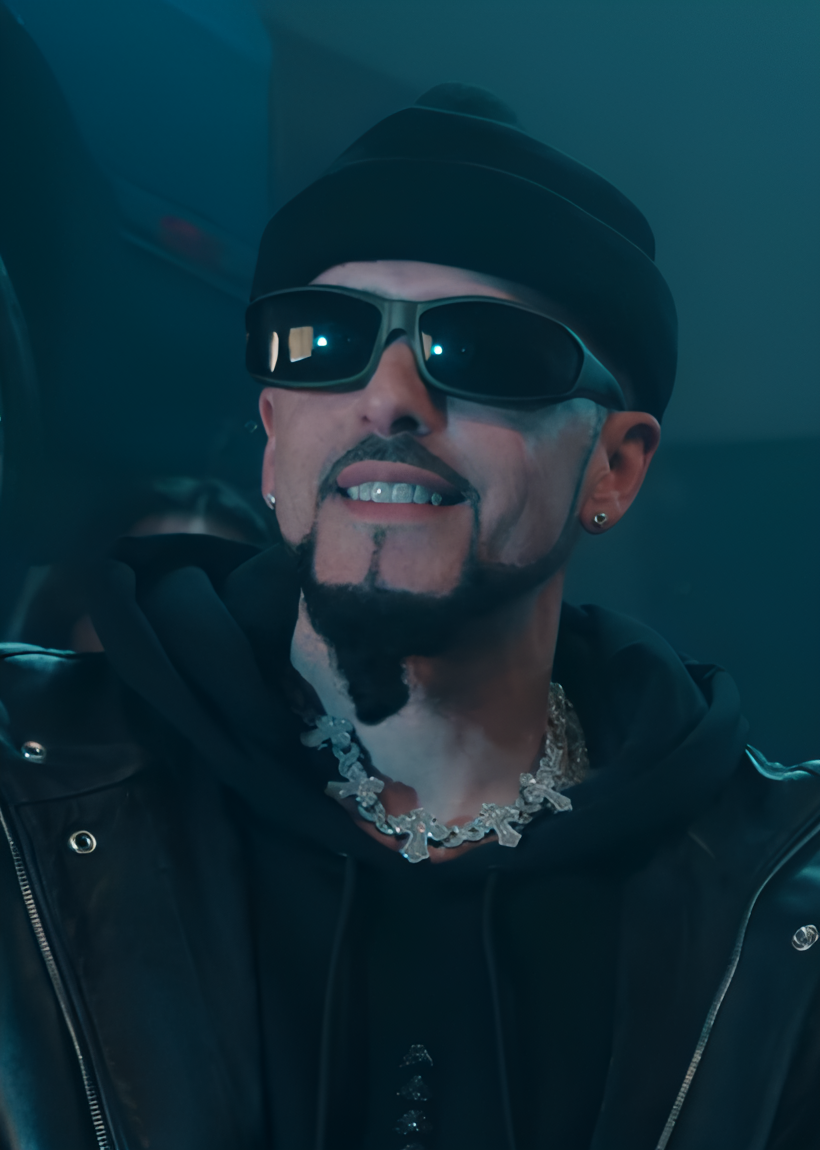
- Yandel in 2025
- Born: Llandel Veguilla Malavé; January 14, 1977 (age 49); Cayey, Puerto Rico
- Other names: El Capitán; La Leyenda; El Capi
- Occupations: Singer; songwriter
- Spouse: Edneris Espada (m. 2004)
- Children: 2
- Awards: Full list
- Musical career
- Genres: Reggaeton; urban pop; Latin hip-hop; dancehall
- Works: Discography
- Years active: 1995–present
- Labels: La Leyenda; WY; Machete; Sony Latin; Líderes; Fresh; Y; Square Houze; Warner Latina; Rimas
- Formerly of: Wisin & Yandel
- Website: yandel.com (in Spanish)

Llandel Veguilla Malavé (born January 14, 1977), best known by his stage name Yandel, is a Puerto Rican singer who is a member of the reggaeton duo Wisin & Yandel. He released his first solo album, Quien Contra Mí, in 2003. His second solo studio album, De Líder a Leyenda, was released in 2013 and was certified Gold (Latin) by the RIAA in 2014.

== Early life and family ==
Llandel Veguilla Malavé was born on January 14, 1977, in Cayey, Puerto Rico, the son of Julio Veguilla and Lucy Malavé. He has two siblings, a younger brother named Gadiel, who is also a singer, and a sister named Linnette. Before he became a singer, Yandel worked as a barber in his hometown.

== Music career ==
Yandel met Wisin in school. They began performing as a duo in 1998 (Yandel then billing himself as "Llandel") and made their album debut in 2000 with Los Reyes del Nuevo Milenio. They later made the jump to a major label in 2003 with Mi Vida... My Life, their first for Universal subsidiary Fresh Productions. Pa'l Mundo then catapulted them to mainstream success in 2005. Subsequently, Wisin & Yandel established their label, WY Records, and presented an affiliate group, Los Vaqueros. In November 2013, after the duo's Líderes tour, they went on hiatus. Since then he has continued to tour. A third album, Dangerous, was released in November 2015.

== Personal life ==
In July 2004, Veguilla married his long-time girlfriend Edneris Espada Figueroa. They have two sons together, Adrián Yandel Veguilla (born January 25, 2001) and Dereck Adrián Veguilla born on (May 27, 2004).

== Tours ==
- De Líder a Leyenda VIP Tour (2014)
- Dangerous Tour (2016)

== Discography ==
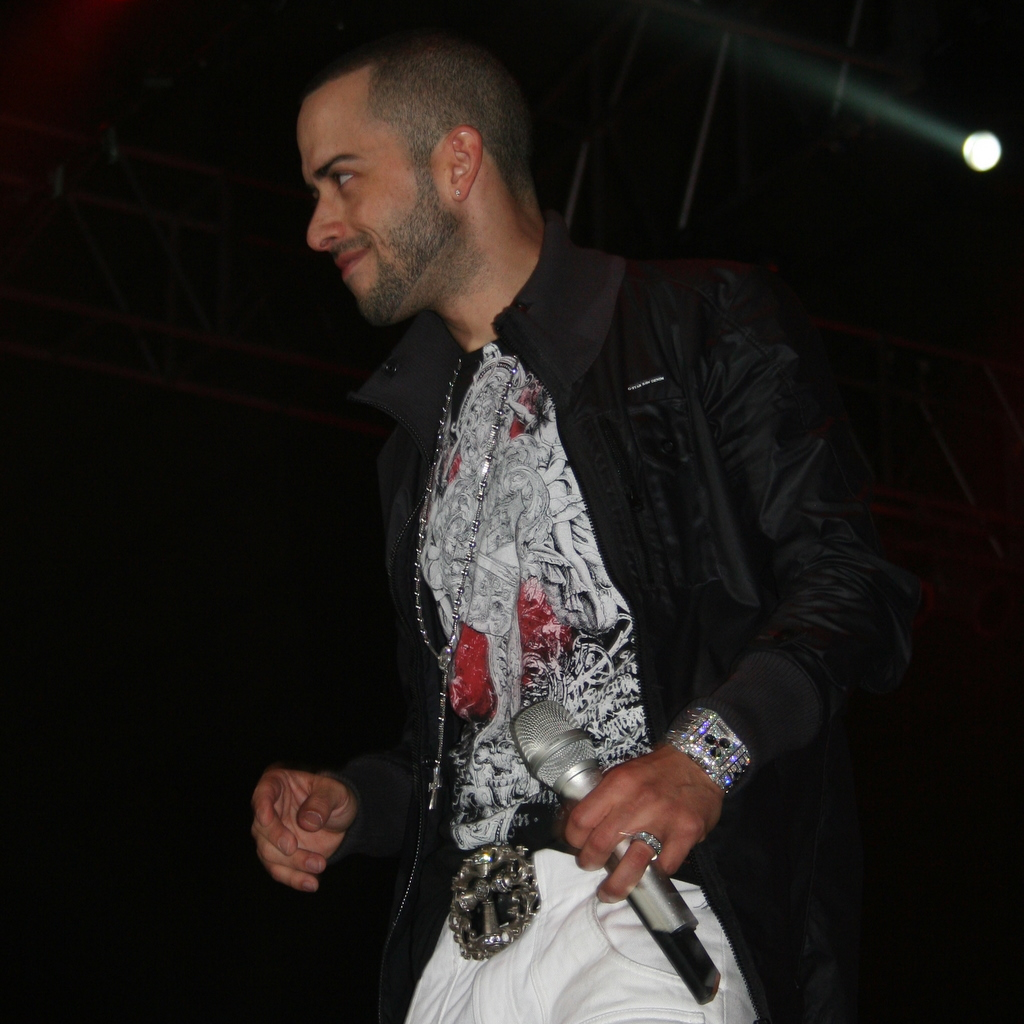
Yandel performing in 2008

=== Studio albums ===
- Quien Contra Mí (2003)
- De Líder a Leyenda (2013)
- Dangerous (2015)
- Update (2017)
- The One (2019)
- Quien Contra Mí 2 (2020)
- Dynasty (2021, with Tainy)
- Resistencia (2023)
- Elyte (2024)
- Infinito (2026)

=== EPs ===
- Legacy: De Líder a Leyenda Tour (2014)
- Manifesting 20-05 (2024, with Feid)

=== Live albums ===
- Legacy: De Líder a Leyenda Tour (2015)

== Filmography ==
Film
Year	Film	Director	Role	Notes
2011	Game of Thrones	David Benioff & D. B. Weiss	Soundtrack & Mentor	In Spanish "Juego De Tronos"
2005	Wisin & Yandel: Mi Vida... My Life	Jessy Terrero	Himself	Film about Wisin & Yandel's trajectory

Television
Year	Television show	Role	Notes
2010	Victorious	Soundtrack & Mentor	"Make It Shine" by Sony Music
2009	Verano de amor	Himself	Guest star (with Wisin)
2013	La Voz... México	Coach	Season 3 (with Wisin)
