= The One (Yandel album) =

Studio album by Yandel
- Released: March 29, 2019
- Recorded: 2018–2019
- Genre: Reggaeton; Latin trap; R&B
- Length: 55:53
- Language: Spanish
- Label: Y Entertainment LLC & Sony Latin
- Producer: Yandel (as executive producer); Jumbo; Tainy; Los Harmonicos; Luny Tunes; PJ; Nesty; IamChino; Jimmy Joker; Earcandy; Jorge Gomez; Dimelo Flow; Sharo Torres; Magnifico; Soür

Yandel chronology
#Update (2017)	The One (2019)	Quien Contra Mí 2 (2020)

Singles from The One
- 1. "Sumba Yandel" Released: January 14, 2019; 2. "Calentón" Released: March 29, 2019; 3. "Perreito Lite" Released: May 17, 2019; 4. "Una Vez Más" Released: June 14, 2019

The One is the fifth studio album by Puerto Rican singer and songwriter Yandel. It was released on March 29, 2019, under Sony Music Latin. It was recorded at Criteria Studios in Miami. It was produced by Yandel and some of the biggest producers like Tainy, Nesty "La Mente Maestra", Luny Tunes among others. It is also his first album as a solo artist to not have any featured artist nor collaborations. He mentioned in an interview that one of the reasons he named it The One is because the album only has his voice with no collaborations.

== Singles and favorite songs ==
Yandel released Sumba Yandel as the first single for this album on January 14, 2019, which was also his 42nd birthday. The song "Calentón", considered the second single as the music video was released on the same day as the album. Perreito Lite and Una Vez Más were released as singles with music videos later on that year.

Billboard published a top 5 favorite tracks list of the album written by Suzette Fernandez. Each song is being described. The songs on that list were "Dime", "Tequila", "Mia Mia", "Que No Acabe", and "Pa Que Goce".

== Track listing ==
No.	Title	Producer(s)	Length
1.	"Calentón"	Dímelo Flow · Magnifico · Sharo Towers	2:56
2.	"Sumba Yandel"	Jumbo	3:28
3.	"Perreito Lite"	Jumbo	3:10
4.	"Dime"	Earcandy · I Am Chino · Jimmy Joker · Jorge Gomez	2:44
5.	"Que No Acabe"	Tainy	3:34
6.	"Coraje"	Los Harmonicos	2:54
7.	"Sola Solita"	Dynell · Luny Tunes · Pedro Ortiz “PJ”	3:41
8.	"Calculadora"	Los Harmonicos · Tainy	3:40
9.	"Tequila"	Nesty	3:39
10.	"Una Señal"	Tainy	3:22
11.	"Pom Pom"	Dynell · Earcandy · Los Harmonicos	2:55
12.	"Mia Mía"	Tainy	3:15
13.	"Una Vez Más"	Tainy	3:31
14.	"Te Amare"	Los Harmonicos	4:02
15.	"No Sé"	Tainy	2:46
16.	"No Se Olvida"	Los Harmonicos	3:08
17.	"Pa' Que Goce"	Earcandy · Sour	3:09
Total length:			55:53

== Charts ==
Chart (2019)	Peak position
US Latin Rhythm Albums (Billboard)	9
US Top Latin Albums (Billboard)	13
