= Dynasty (Tainy and Yandel album) =

Studio album by Tainy and Yandel
- Released: July 15, 2021
- Recorded: 2020–21
- Genre: Reggaeton
- Length: 24:05
- Label: Neon16; Y
- Producer: Tainy

Yandel chronology
Quien Contra Mí 2 (2020)	Dynasty (2021)	Resistencia (2023)

Dynasty is a collaborative studio album between producer Tainy and reggaeton singer Yandel. It was released on July 15, 2021, by Neon16 and Y Entertainment. The album contains 9 tracks and features guest appearances by Rauw Alejandro and Saint Jhn. The album was made to marked the 16th Anniversary of collaborations between both artists. The first single "Deja Vu" was released on July 2, 2021. To promote the single on the release day, the track was promoted at stadiums on 13 different cities all over United States and Latin America. Eventually, to other singles was released to promote the album: "Si te vas" and "Una mas".

Dynasty received a positive review from Rolling Stone. It debuted at No. 25 on the US Billboard Top Latin Albums chart and No. 49 on the Spanish albums chart.

== Track listing ==
No.	Title	Length
1.	"Intro"	0:20
2.	"Una Más" (featuring Rauw Alejandro)	2:46
3.	"Camara Lenta"	2:33
4.	"Deja vú"	2:58
5.	"El plan"	2:39
6.	"Háblame claro"	2:23
7.	"Si te vas" (with Saint Jhn)	3:14
8.	"Buscando calor"	2:53
9.	"Va y ven"	4:19
Total length:		24:09

== Charts ==
Weekly chart performance for Dynasty
Chart (2021)	Peak position
Spanish Albums (PROMUSICAE)	49
US Top Latin Albums (Billboard)	25

== Certifications ==
Certifications for Dynasty
Region	Certification	Certified units/sales
United States (RIAA)	Gold (Latin)	30,000^{‡}
^{‡} Sales+streaming figures based on certification alone.
