= Los Reyes del Nuevo Milenio =

Los Reyes Del Nuevo Milenio

Studio album by Wisin & Yandel
- Released: May 30, 2000
- Recorded: 1999–2000
- Genre: Reggaeton, hip-hop
- Length: 34:11
- Label: Fresh Production
- Producer: DJ Nelson; DJ Rafy Melendez; DJ Black; DJ Eric

Wisin & Yandel chronology
Los Reyes Del Nuevo Milenio (2000)	De Nuevos a Viejos (2001)

Singles from Los Reyes del Nuevo Milenio
- 1. "Gerla" Released: 2000

Los Reyes Del Nuevo Milenio (English: The Kings Of The New Millennium) is Wisin & Yandel's first album. It peaked at #35 on the Billboard Top Latin Albums chart.

== Track listing ==
No.	Title	Producer(s)	Length
1.	"No Fue Golpe de Suerte"	DJ Rafy Melendez	2:58
2.	"Gerla"	DJ Rafy Melendez	3:08
3.	"Todas Quieren Ser Las Más Bellas" (featuring Baby Rasta & Gringo)	DJ Nelson	3:22
4.	"Pena"	DJ Rafy Melendez	3:41
5.	"Me Quieren Detener"	DJ Adan	2:48
6.	"Voy Por Ti" (featuring Tempo)	DJ Black	3:27
7.	"Los Noto Fraudulentos"	DJ Rafy Melendez	3:01
8.	"Vivir En Esta Tierra"	DJ Eric	2:38
9.	"Dile"	DJ Eric	3:35
10.	"The Remixes 'Gerla'"	DJ Rafy Melendez	5:26
Total length:			34:11

== Charts ==
Chart (2000)	Peak position
US Top Latin Albums (Billboard)	35
