= Quién Contra Mí =

Quien Contra Mí

Studio album by Yandel
- Released: September 15, 2003 (PR)
- Recorded: 2003
- Genre: Reggaeton
- Length: 34:22
- Labels: Fresh Production; Lideres Entertainment Group; Machete Music
- Producers: Luny Tunes; DJ Sonic; DJ Joe; Fido

Yandel chronology
Quien Contra Mí (2003)	De Líder a Leyenda (2013)

Singles from Quien Contra Mí
- 1. "Te Suelto el Pelo" Released: 2003; 2. "Ya Yo Me Cansé" Released: 2004; 3. "Say Ho!" Released: 2004

Quien Contra Mí (English: Who's Against Me?) is the debut album by Puerto Rican reggaeton singer-songwriter Yandel released physically on September 15, 2003, through Fresh Production, and released Worldwide on January 13, 2004, through Lideres Entertainment Group. The album was re-released on January 30, 2007, through Machete Music an urban music label owned by Universal. Three songs from the album were released as singles with their respective music video; "Te Suelto el Pelo", "Ya Yo Me Cansé" and "Say Ho!", they were included on the Bonus CD Edition from the album. Despite the songs "Mami Yo Quisiera Quedarme" featuring Alexis and "En la Disco Me Conoció" featuring Fido, weren't released officially as singles, both were featured at the end of the video of "Te Suelto el Pelo".

A sequel to the album, Quien Contra Mí 2, was released on July 31, 2020.

== Track listing ==
Standard edition
No.	Title	Producer(s)	Length
1.	"Intro"		1:51
2.	"Te Suelto el Pelo"	DJ Sonic	2:17
3.	"Ya Yo Me Cansé"	Luny Tunes, Fido	2:36
4.	"Mami Yo Quisiera Quedarme" (featuring Alexis)	Luny Tunes	3:06
5.	"Dónde Está Mi Gata"	DJ Sonic	2:46
6.	"Buscame"	Luny Tunes	2:25
7.	"Say Ho!"	Luny Tunes	3:12
8.	"La Calle Me Lo Pidió" (featuring Tego Calderón)	Luny Tunes	3:05
9.	"Perreo"	DJ Joe	3:17
10.	"En la Disco Me Conoció" (featuring Fido)	DJ Joe	2:30
11.	"Dembow" (Remix)	Luny Tunes	2:09
12.	"Listo para el Cantazo" (Bonus track)	Luny Tunes	2:36
Total length:			34:22

Bonus CD edition
No.	Title	Length
13.	"Te Suelto el Pelo" (featuring Alexis & Fido) (Video Version) (Music video)	3:58
14.	"Ya Yo Me Cansé" (Music video)	2:50
15.	"Say Ho!" (Music video)	1:42

== Chart performance ==
=== Charts ===
Chart (2003)	Peak position
U.S. Billboard Top Latin Albums	24
U.S. Billboard Latin Pop Albums	8
U.S. Billboard Independent Albums	40
U.S. Billboard Top Heatseekers (South Atlantic)	3

=== Re-release ===
Chart (2007)	Peak position
U.S. Billboard Latin Rhythm Albums	17

== Release history ==
Country	Date	Format	Label(s)	Version
Puerto Rico	September 15, 2003 (physical only)	CD	Fresh Production	Original
Worldwide	January 13, 2004	CD / Digital download	Lideres Ent. Group	Original
Worldwide	May 25, 2004	CD / Digital download	Lideres Ent. Group	Bonus CD Edition
Worldwide	January 30, 2007	CD / Digital download	Machete Music (Universal)	Re-release
