= Alexis & Fido discography =

- Studio albums: 5
- Live albums: 0
- Singles: 12
- Music videos: 13

This is a comprehensive listing of official releases by Alexis & Fido, a Puerto Rican reggaeton duo.

== Albums ==
=== Studio albums ===
Title	Album details	Peak chart positions			Certifications
Title	Album details	US	US Latin	US Latin Rhythm	Certifications
The Pitbulls	Released: November 15, 2005; Label: Sony BMG Norte; Formats: CD, digital download	164	4	2	RIAA: Platinum (Latin)
Sobrenatural	Released: November 13, 2007; Label: Sony BMG Latin; Formats: CD, digital download	—	11	2	RIAA: Gold (Latin)
Down to Earth	Released: March 31, 2009; Label: Sony Music Latin; Formats: CD, digital download	—	5	2	
Perreología	Released: March 22, 2011; Label: Sony Music Latin; Formats: CD, digital download	192	10	2	RIAA: Gold (Latin)
La Esencia	Released: March 4, 2014; Label: Warner Music Latina; Formats: CD, digital download	—	5	1	

=== Compilation albums ===
2006: Los Reyes del Perreo

== Singles ==
Title	Year	Peak chart positions					Album	Certifications
Title	Year	US Latin	US Latin Airplay	US Latin Pop	US Latin Rhythm	US Tropical	Album	Certifications
"El Lobo" (featuring Héctor el Father, Baby Rasta)	2005	—	—	—	39	—	The Pitbulls	
"El Tiburón" (featuring Baby Ranks)	2005	—	—	—	—	—	The Pitbulls	
"Eso Ehh...!!"	2005	7	7	20	6	6	The Pitbulls	
"Agárrale El Pantalón" (featuring Zion & Lennox)	2006	36	36	—	14	—	The Pitbulls	
"Me Quiere Besar"	2006	18	18	—	6	15	Los Reyes del Perreo	
"5 Letras"	2007	23	23	—	5	34	Sobrenatural	
"Soy Igual Que Tú" (featuring Toby Love)	2007	13	13	—	1	8	Sobrenatural	
"Sobrenatural"	2008	—	6	—	5	30	Sobrenatural	
"Súbete"	2008	32	6	—	6	24	Down To Earth	
"Ojos Que No Ven"	2009	19	19	35	2	3	Down To Earth	
"Mi Música Ehh"	2009	—	—	—	—	—	Down To Earth	
"Bartender"	2009	42	42	—	3	15	Down To Earth	
"No Debe Tocarte" (featuring Toby Love)	2009	—	—	—	—	—	Down To Earth	
"Mala Conducta (featuring Franco el Gorila)	2010	—	—	—	—	8	Perreología	
"Rescate" (featuring Daddy Yankee)	2010	28	28	36	6	7	Perreología	
"Contéstame El Teléfono" (featuring Flex)	2011	4	4	6	1	1	Perreología	
"Energía"	2011	25	25	28	4	12	Perreología	
"Camuflaje"	2011	—	—	—	15	—	Perreología	
"Donde Estés Llegaré"	2012	—	—	—	8	—	Perreología	
"Alócate"	2013	31	31	23	6	10	La Esencia	
"Rompe La Cintura"	2013	8	4	4	1	2	La Esencia	
"Imagínate"	2014		44	21	7	15	La Esencia	
"Problemático" (featuring Gotay)	2014	—	—	—	23	—	Non-album singles	
"A Ti Te Encanta"	2014	—	—	31	12	20	Non-album singles	
"Una en un Millón"	2015	23	29	19	13	28	Non-album singles	PROMUSICAE: 2× Platinum; RIAA: 2× Platinum (Latin)
"La Cómplice"	2016	—	—	33	18	31	Non-album singles	
"Me Descontrola"	2017	—	—	34	—	—	Non-album singles	
"—" indicates song did not chart.

== Collaborations ==
Year	Single	Album
2002	"Piden Perreo" (with Wisin & Yandel)	De Otra Manera
2002	Sedúceme (Alexis with Yandel)	De Otra Manera
2004	"El Jinete" (with Wisin)	El Sobreviviente
2004	"En La Disco Me Conoció" (Fido with Yandel)	Quien Contra Mí
2005	"Sacala" (remix)(with Wisin & Yandel, Lito & Polaco, Héctor el Father)	
2006	"Royal Rumble (Se Van)" (Alexis with Daddy Yankee, Don Omar, Wise Da' Gangsta, Héctor el Father, Yomo, Zion, Wisin, Franco el Gorila, Arcángel)	Los Benjamins
2009	"Si tu no Estas" (Alexis With Limi-T 21, Ñejo & Dalmata)	
2009	"Yo Tengo Una Gata" (Alexis with Zion & Lennox, Daddy Yankee, Arcángel & De La Ghetto, Yomo, Yaviah, Plan B, Jadiel, Franco el Gorila)	
2010	"Cuidau Au Au" (with Cosculluela, Daddy Yankee)	
2010	"Suavecito Despacito" (with Wisin & Yandel)	Los Vaqueros 2: El Regreso
2016	"Si Te Vas (Versión Reggaeton)" (by Paulina Rubio)	
2016	"Una En Un Millón (Remix)" (with Fonseca, Kevin Roldan)	
TBA

== Videography ==
Year	Title
2004	"El Rolo"
2004	"Tócale Bocina"
2005	"Ella Le Gusta"
2005	"El Tiburón" (Featuring Baby Ranks)
2006	"Eso Ehh..."
2006	"Me Quiere Besar"
2007	"Soy Igual Que Tu" (Featuring Toby Love)
2007	"5 Letras"
2008	"Sobrenatural"
2008	"Somos Tal Para Cual" (Featuring Los Yetzons)
2009	"Ojos Que No Ven"
2009	"Mi Musica Ehhh"
2009	"Bartender"
2010	"No Debe Tocarte" (Featuring Toby Love)
2011	"Contéstame El Telefono" (Featuring Flex)
2012	"Energía"
2012	"Donde Estés Llegaré"
2013	"Rompe La Cintura"
2013	"Alócate"
2016	"Si Te Vas (Versión Reggaeton)" Paulina Rubio
