= List of awards and nominations received by Farruko =

Farruko awards and nominations
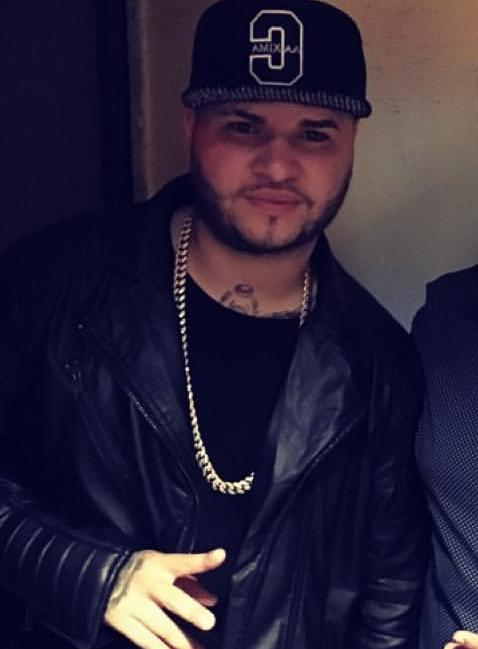
- Farruko in 2015
Awards and nominations
Award	Wins	Nominations
Billboard Music Awards	0	6
Billboard Latin Music Awards	2	24
Heat Latin Music Awards	1	15
Latin American Music Awards	1	12
Latin Grammy Awards	2	9
Premios Juventud	4	24
Premios Lo Nuestro	6	28

Totals (Note: Certain award groups do not simply award one winner. They acknowledge several different recipients, have runners-up, and have third place. Since this is a specific recognition and is different from losing an award, runner-up mentions are considered wins in this award tally. For simplification and to avoid errors, each award in this list has been presumed to have had a prior nomination.)
- Wins: 21
- Nominations: 148

Farruko, a Puerto Rican singer and songwriter, has received various awards and nominations including two Billboard Latin Music Awards, two Latin Grammy Awards and six Premios Lo Nuestro, among others.

In 2010, he released his first studio album El Talento del Bloque, followed by The Most Powerful Rookie in 2012 and Farruko Presenta: Los Menores in 2014, the latter two were nominated for the Latin Grammy Award for Best Urban Music Album. In 2013, he achieved significant commercial success with the song "6 AM", alongside Colombian singer J Balvin, the song won Urban Song of the Year and Urban Collaboration of the Year at the Premio Lo Nuestro 2015 and received two Latin Grammy Award nominations.

His fourth album, Visionary, was released in 2015 and was also nominated for the Latin Grammy Award for Best Urban Music Album, being Farruko's third nomination in the category. In 2016, he won the Latin Grammy Award for Best Urban Song as one of the songwriters of Yandel's "Encantado". His following albums were TrapXficante (2017), Gangalee (2019), and En Letra de Otro (2019).

In 2018, he participated in the remix for Pedro Capó's "Calma", the song was a huge commercial success and received various awards and nominations, it was nominated for six Billboard Latin Music Awards winning Latin Pop Song of the Year, it also won the Latin Grammy Award for Best Urban Fusion/Performance.

His eighth album, La 167, was released in 2021, it includes the successful single "Pepas", the song was nominated for Top Latin Song at the 2022 Billboard Music Awards and Song of the Year at the Premio Lo Nuestro 2022.

== Awards and nominations ==
Award	Year	Category	Recipient(s) and nominee(s)	Result	Ref.
American Music Awards	2021	Favorite Song - Latin	"Pepas"	Nominated	
American Music Awards	2022	Favorite Male Latin Artist	Himself	Nominated	
American Music Awards	2022	Favorite Latin Album	La 167	Nominated	
Billboard Music Awards	2015	Top Latin Song	"6 AM" with J Balvin	Nominated	
Billboard Music Awards	2020	Top Latin Album	Gangalee	Nominated	
Billboard Music Awards	2022	Top Latin Artist	Himself	Nominated	
Billboard Music Awards	2022	Top Latin Male Artist	Himself	Nominated	
Billboard Music Awards	2022	Top Latin Song	"Pepas"	Nominated	
Billboard Music Awards	2022	Top Dance/Electronic Song	"Pepas"	Nominated	
Billboard Latin Music Awards	2015	Latin Rhythm Albums Artist of the Year, Solo	Himself	Nominated	
Billboard Latin Music Awards	2015	Hot Latin Song of the Year	"6 AM" (with J Balvin)	Nominated	
Billboard Latin Music Awards	2015	Hot Latin Song of the Year, Vocal Event	"6 AM" (with J Balvin)	Nominated	
Billboard Latin Music Awards	2015	Airplay Song of the Year	"6 AM" (with J Balvin)	Nominated	
Billboard Latin Music Awards	2015	Digital Song of the Year	"6 AM" (with J Balvin)	Nominated	
Billboard Latin Music Awards	2015	Latin Rhythm Airplay Song of the Year	"6 AM" (with J Balvin)	Won	
Billboard Latin Music Awards	2016	Latin Rhythm Songs Artist of the Year, Solo	Himself	Nominated	
Billboard Latin Music Awards	2016	Latin Rhythm Albums Artist of the Year, Solo	Himself	Nominated	
Billboard Latin Music Awards	2016	Hot Latin Song of the Year, Vocal Event	"Sunset" (featuring Nicky Jam and Shaggy)	Nominated	
Billboard Latin Music Awards	2017	Latin Rhythm Albums Artist of the Year, Solo	Himself	Nominated	
Billboard Latin Music Awards	2017	Latin Rhythm Album of the Year	Visionary	Nominated	
Billboard Latin Music Awards	2017	Hot Latin Song of the Year, Vocal Event	"Chillax" (featuring Ky-Mani Marley)	Nominated	
Billboard Latin Music Awards	2017	Latin Rhythm Song of the Year	"Chillax" (featuring Ky-Mani Marley)	Nominated	
Billboard Latin Music Awards	2020	Hot Latin Song of the Year	"Calma" (with Pedro Capó)	Nominated	
Billboard Latin Music Awards	2020	Vocal Event Hot Latin Song of the Year	"Calma" (with Pedro Capó)	Nominated	
Billboard Latin Music Awards	2020	Streaming Song of the Year	"Calma" (with Pedro Capó)	Nominated	
Billboard Latin Music Awards	2020	Latin Pop Song of the Year	"Calma" (with Pedro Capó)	Won	
Billboard Latin Music Awards	2020	Airplay Song of the Year	"Calma" (with Pedro Capó)	Nominated	
Billboard Latin Music Awards	2020	Airplay Song of the Year	"Baila Baila Baila" (with Ozuna, Daddy Yankee, J Balvin, Anuel AA)	Nominated	
Billboard Latin Music Awards	2020	Latin Rhythm Song of the Year	"Baila Baila Baila" (with Ozuna, Daddy Yankee, J Balvin, Anuel AA)	Nominated	
Billboard Latin Music Awards	2020	Digital Song of the Year	"Baila Baila Baila" (with Ozuna, Daddy Yankee, J Balvin, Anuel AA)	Nominated	
Billboard Latin Music Awards	2020	Digital Song of the Year	"Calma" (with Pedro Capó)	Nominated	
Billboard Latin Music Awards	2020	Latin Rhythm Album of the Year	Gangalee	Nominated	
Billboard Latin Music Awards	2021	Latin Pop Song of the Year	"Si Me Dices Que Si" (with Reik and Camilo)	Nominated	
Billboard Latin Music Awards	2022	Artist of the Year	Himself	Nominated	
Billboard Latin Music Awards	2022	Hot Latin Songs Artist of the Year, Male	Himself	Nominated	
Billboard Latin Music Awards	2022	Latin Rhythm Artist of the Year, Solo	Himself	Nominated	
Billboard Latin Music Awards	2022	Hot Latin Song of the Year	"Pepas"	Won	
Billboard Latin Music Awards	2022	Sales Song of the Year	"Pepas"	Won	
Billboard Latin Music Awards	2022	Streaming Song of the Year	"Pepas"	Won	
Billboard Latin Music Awards	2022	Latin Rhythm Song of the Year	"Pepas"	Won	
Billboard Latin Music Awards	2022	Airplay Song of the Year	"Pepas"	Nominated	
Billboard Latin Music Awards	2022	Airplay Song of the Year	"El Incomprendido" (featuring Víctor Cárdenas & DJ Adonis)	Nominated	
Billboard Latin Music Awards	2022	Top Latin Album of the Year	La 167	Nominated	
Billboard Latin Music Awards	2022	Latin Rhythm Album of the Year	La 167	Nominated	
Grammy Awards	2023	Best Música Urbana Album	La 167	Nominated	
Heat Latin Music Awards	2017	Best Male Artist	Himself	Nominated	
Heat Latin Music Awards	2017	Best Urban Artist	Himself	Nominated	
Heat Latin Music Awards	2017	Best Artist - North	Himself	Won	
Heat Latin Music Awards	2017	Best Music Video	"Chillax"	Nominated	
Heat Latin Music Awards	2019	Best Urban Artist	Himself	Nominated	
Heat Latin Music Awards	2019	Best Collaboration	"Krippy Kush" (with Bad Bunny and Nicki Minaj)	Nominated	
Heat Latin Music Awards	2020	Best Male Artist	Himself	Nominated	
Heat Latin Music Awards	2020	Best Urban Artist	Himself	Nominated	
Heat Latin Music Awards	2020	Best Artist - North	Himself	Nominated	
Heat Latin Music Awards	2020	Best Collaboration	"Si Se Da (Remix)" (with Myke Towers, Arcángel, Sech and Zion)	Nominated	
Heat Latin Music Awards	2020	Best Collaboration	"Fantasías" (with Rauw Alejandro)	Nominated	
Heat Latin Music Awards	2020	Best Video	"Borinquen Bella" (with Pedro Capó and Justin Quiles)	Nominated	
Heat Latin Music Awards	2021	Best Male Artist	Himself	Nominated	
Heat Latin Music Awards	2021	Best Urban Artist	Himself	Nominated	
Heat Latin Music Awards	2021	Best Artist - North	Himself	Nominated	
iHeartRadio Music Awards	2020	Latin Pop/Urban Song of the Year	"Calma" (with Pedro Capó and Alicia Keys)	Nominated	
iHeartRadio Music Awards	2022	Latin Pop/Reggaeton Artist of the Year	Himself	Nominated	
iHeartRadio Music Awards	2022	Latin Pop/Reggaeton Song of the Year	"Pepas"	Won	
Latin American Music Awards	2015	Favorite Tropical Song	"Me Voy Enamorando" (with Chino & Nacho)	Nominated	
Latin American Music Awards	2016	Favorite Urban Album	Visionary	Won	
Latin American Music Awards	2017	Favorite Urban Song	"Chillax" (featuring Ky-Mani Marley)	Nominated	
Latin American Music Awards	2019	Song of the Year	"Calma" (with Pedro Capó)	Nominated	
Latin American Music Awards	2019	Favorite Pop/Rock Song	"Calma" (with Pedro Capó)	Nominated	
Latin American Music Awards	2019	Favorite Urban Album	Gangalee	Nominated	
Latin American Music Awards	2021	Favorite Pop Song	"Si Me Dices Que Sí" (with Reik and Camilo)	Nominated	
Latin American Music Awards	2021	Collaboration of the Year	"Si Me Dices Que Sí" (with Reik and Camilo)	Nominated	
Latin American Music Awards	2022	Artist of the Year	Himself	Nominated	
Latin American Music Awards	2022	Favorite Male Artist	Himself	Nominated	
Latin American Music Awards	2022	Song of the Year	"Pepas"	Nominated	
Latin American Music Awards	2022	Favorite Urban Song	"Pepas"	Nominated	
Latin American Music Awards	2023	Artist of the Year	Himself	Nominated	
Latin American Music Awards	2023	Favorite Urban Artist	Himself	Nominated	
Latin American Music Awards	2023	Album of the Year	La 167	Nominated	
Latin American Music Awards	2023	Favorite Urban Album	La 167	Nominated	
Latin American Music Awards	2023	Collaboration of the Year	"El Incomprendido" (with Víctor Cárdenas and DJ Adoni)	Nominated	
Latin American Music Awards	2023	Best Collaboration - Pop/Urban	"El Incomprendido" (with Víctor Cárdenas and DJ Adoni)	Nominated	
Latin American Music Awards	2024	Favorite Pop Song	"Pasa_je_ro"	Nominated	
Latin Grammy Awards	2012	Best Urban Music Album	The Most Powerful Rookie	Nominated	
Latin Grammy Awards	2014	Best Urban Song	"6 AM" (with J Balvin)	Nominated	
Latin Grammy Awards	2014	Best Urban Fusion/Performance	"6 AM" (with J Balvin)	Nominated	
Latin Grammy Awards	2015	Best Urban Music Album	Farruko Presenta: Los Menores	Nominated	
Latin Grammy Awards	2016	Best Urban Music Album	Visionary	Nominated	
Latin Grammy Awards	2016	Best Urban Song	"Encantadora" (as songwriter)	Won	
Latin Grammy Awards	2019	Best Urban Fusion/Performance	"Calma" (with Pedro Capó)	Won	
Latin Grammy Awards	2019	Best Urban Fusion/Performance	"Pa Olvidarte" (with ChocQuibTown, Zion & Lennox and Manuel Turizo)	Nominated	
Latin Grammy Awards	2021	Best Reggaeton Performance	"La Tóxica"	Nominated	
Latin Grammy Awards	2023	Best Urban Song	"Mi Mejor Canción"	Nominated	
LOS40 Music Awards	2014	Best Spanish Language Song	"6 AM" (with J Balvin)	Nominated	
LOS40 Music Awards	2019	LOS40 Global Show Award	"Calma" (with Pedro Capó)	Nominated	
LOS40 Music Awards	2021	Best Latin Song	"Pepas"	Nominated	
MTV Video Music Awards	2022	Best Latin	"Pepas"	Nominated	
MTV Millennial Awards	2019	Hit of the Year	"Calma" (with Pedro Capó)	Nominated	
MTV Millennial Awards	2021	Hit of the Year	"Relación (Remix)" (with Sech, Daddy Yankee, J Balvin and Rosalía)	Nominated	
MTV Millennial Awards	2021	Viral Anthem	"La Tóxica"	Nominated	
Premios Juventud	2014	La Combinación Perfecta (Best Collaboration)	"6 AM" (with J Balvin)	Nominated	
Premios Juventud	2015	Best Urban Artist	Himself	Nominated	
Premios Juventud	2015	Lo Toco Todo (Best Album)	Farruko Presenta: Los Menores	Nominated	
Premios Juventud	2016	Best Urban Artist	Himself	Nominated	
Premios Juventud	2016	Lo Toco Todo (Best Album)	Visionary	Nominated	
Premios Juventud	2016	La Combinación Perfecta (Best Collaboration)	"Sunset" (featuring Shaggy and Nicky Jam)	Nominated	
Premios Juventud	2017	Best Song for Dancing	"Ya No Me Duele Más" (with Silvestre Dangond)	Nominated	
Premios Juventud	2017	Best Video	"Don't Let Go"	Nominated	
Premios Juventud	2019	Best Song: Can't Get Enough of This Song	"Calma" (with Pedro Capó)	Won	
Premios Juventud	2019	Best Song: Singing in the Shower	"Calma" (with Pedro Capó)	Nominated	
Premios Juventud	2019	Best Song: The Traffic Jam	"Calma" (with Pedro Capó)	Nominated	
Premios Juventud	2020	The Quarentune	"El tiempo pasa (cuarentena)" (with Sharo Towers, Andy Cay & Alex AC)	Nominated	
Premios Juventud	2020	The Quarentune	"Color esperanza 2020" (with Various artists)	Nominated	
Premios Juventud	2020	OMG Collaboration	"Del barrio a la ciudad" (with T3r Elemento)	Nominated	
Premios Juventud	2021	La Mezcla Perfecta (Song with the Best Collaboration)	"Relación (Remix)" (with Sech, Daddy Yankee, J Balvin and Rosalía)	Won	
Premios Juventud	2021	Viral Track of the Year (Song with the fastest rise in social media)	"Relación (Remix)" (with Sech, Daddy Yankee, J Balvin and Rosalía)	Nominated	
Premios Juventud	2022	Artist of the Youth – Male	Himself	Nominated	
Premios Juventud	2022	My Favorite Streaming Artist	Himself	Nominated	
Premios Juventud	2022	Album of the Year	La 167	Nominated	
Premios Juventud	2022	The Catchiest Song	"Pepas"	Nominated	
Premios Juventud	2022	Viral Track of the Year	"Pepas"	Won	
Premios Juventud	2022	The Perfect Mix	"El Incomprendido" (with Víctor Cárdenas & DJ Adoni)	Won	
Premios Juventud	2022	Best Tropical Mix	"La Bendición" (with Lenier)	Nominated	
Premios Juventud	2022	Video with Best Social Message	"My Lova"	Nominated	
Premios Juventud	2023	The Hottest Choreography	"Suelta" (with Dímelo Flow, Rauw Alejandro, María Becerra, Mr. Vegas & Fatman Scoop)	Pending	
Premios Juventud	2023	Best Pop/Urban Collaboration	"Suelta" (with Dímelo Flow, Rauw Alejandro, María Becerra, Mr. Vegas & Fatman Scoop)	Pending	
Premios Lo Nuestro	2015	Urban Song of the Year	"6 AM" (with J Balvin)	Won	
Premios Lo Nuestro	2015	Urban Collaboration of the Year	"6 AM" (with J Balvin)	Won	
Premios Lo Nuestro	2015	Urban Collaboration of the Year	"Passion Whine" (featuring Sean Paul)	Nominated	
Premios Lo Nuestro	2016	Urban Artist of the Year	Himself	Nominated	
Premios Lo Nuestro	2016	Urban Album of the Year	Farruko Presenta: Los Menores	Nominated	
Premios Lo Nuestro	2017	Urban Artist of the Year	Himself	Nominated	
Premios Lo Nuestro	2017	Album of the Year	Visionary	Nominated	
Premios Lo Nuestro	2017	Urban Album of the Year	Visionary	Nominated	
Premios Lo Nuestro	2019	Remix of the Year	"Inolvidable (Remix)" (with Daddy Yankee, Akon and Sean Paul)	Nominated	
Premios Lo Nuestro	2020	Remix of the Year	"Baila Baila Baila" (with Ozuna, Daddy Yankee, J Balvin and Anuel AA)	Nominated	
Premios Lo Nuestro	2020	Remix of the Year	"Me Gusta (Remix)" (with Natti Natasha)	Nominated	
Premios Lo Nuestro	2020	Remix of the Year	"Calma (Remix)" (with Pedro Capó)	Nominated	
Premios Lo Nuestro	2020	Pop/Rock Collaboration of the Year	"Calma (Remix)" (with Pedro Capó)	Won	
Premios Lo Nuestro	2020	Urban/Pop Song of the Year	"Calma (Remix)" (with Pedro Capó)	Won	
Premios Lo Nuestro	2020	Urban/Trap Song of the Year	"Delincuente" (featuring Anuel AA and Kendo Kaponi)	Nominated	
Premios Lo Nuestro	2021	Male Urban Artist of the Year	Himself	Nominated	
Premios Lo Nuestro	2021	Remix of the Year	"DJ No Pare" (with Justin Quiles, Natti Natasha, Zion, Dalex & Lenny Tavárez)	Nominated	
Premios Lo Nuestro	2021	Remix of the Year	"Relación (Remix)" (with Sech, Daddy Yankee, J Balvin and Rosalía)	Nominated	
Premios Lo Nuestro	2021	Pop Collaboration of the Year	"Si Me Dices Que Sí" (with Reik and Camilo)	Won	
Premios Lo Nuestro	2021	Pop Song of the Year	"Si Me Dices Que Sí" (with Reik and Camilo)	Nominated	
Premios Lo Nuestro	2021	Urban/Pop Song of the Year	"Si Me Dices Que Sí" (with Reik and Camilo)	Won	
Premios Lo Nuestro	2022	Male Urban Artist of the Year	Himself	Nominated	
Premios Lo Nuestro	2022	Song of the Year	"Pepas"	Nominated	
Premios Lo Nuestro	2022	Urban Song of the Year	"Pepas"	Nominated	
Premios Lo Nuestro	2022	Urban/Pop Song of the Year	"La Tóxica"	Nominated	
Premios Lo Nuestro	2022	Remix of the Year	"La Tóxica" (featuring Sech, Myke Towers, Jay Wheeler & Tempo)	Nominated	
Premios Lo Nuestro	2022	Perfect Mix of the Year	"Me Pase" (with Enrique Iglesias)	Nominated	
Premios Lo Nuestro	2022	Urban Album of the Year	La 167	Nominated	
Premios Lo Nuestro	2023	Male Urban Artist of the Year	Himself	Nominated	
Premios Lo Nuestro	2023	Remix of the Year	"Gracias (Remix)" (with Pedro Capó)	Nominated	
Premios Lo Nuestro	2023	Urban Dance/Pop Song of the Year	"El Incomprendido" (with Víctor Cárdenas & DJ Adoni)	Nominated	
Premios Lo Nuestro	2024	Urban Dance/Pop Song of the Year	"Esta Vida" – Marshmello	Nominated	
Premios Lo Nuestro	2024	Urban Collaboration of the Year	"Esta Vida" – Marshmello	Nominated	
Premios Lo Nuestro	2024	Urban/Pop Song of the Year	"Pasa_je_ro"	Nominated	
Premios Tu Música Urbano	2019	Male Urban Artist of the Year	Himself	Nominated	
Premios Tu Música Urbano	2019	Urban Pop Song of the Year	"Calma" (with Pedro Capó)	Won	
Premios Tu Música Urbano	2019	Remix of the Year	"Inolvidable (Remix)" (with Daddy Yankee, Akon and Sean Paul)	Nominated	
Premios Tu Música Urbano	2020	Artist of the Year	Himself	Nominated	
Premios Tu Música Urbano	2020	Male Artist of the Year	Himself	Nominated	
Premios Tu Música Urbano	2020	Male Song of the Year	"Nadie"	Nominated	
Premios Tu Música Urbano	2020	New Generation Song of the Year	"Fantasía" (with Rauw Alejandro)	Nominated	
Premios Tu Música Urbano	2020	Remix of the Year	"Calma (Remix)" (with Pedro Capó and Alicia Keys)	Nominated	
Premios Tu Música Urbano	2020	Remix of the Year	"Ganga" (with Bryant Myers, Anuel AA, Sech, Bad Bunny and Jhay Cortez)	Nominated	
Premios Tu Música Urbano	2020	New Generation Remix of the Year	"Si Se Da" (with Myke Towers, Arcángel, Sech and Zion & Lennox)	Nominated	
Premios Tu Música Urbano	2020	New Generation Remix of the Year	"105F" (with Kevvo, Myke Towers, Arcángel, Ñengo Flow, Brytiago and Chencho)	Nominated	
Premios Tu Música Urbano	2020	Collaboration of the Year	"Delincuente" (featuring Anuel AA and Kendo Kaponi)	Nominated	
Premios Tu Música Urbano	2020	Male Album of the Year	Gangalee	Nominated	
Premios Tu Música Urbano	2022	Artist of the Year	Himself	Nominated	
Premios Tu Música Urbano	2022	Dedication Special Award	Himself	Won	
Premios Tu Música Urbano	2022	Song of the Year	"Pepas"	Nominated	
Premios Tu Música Urbano	2022	Top Song — Dembow	"Curazao" (with El Alfa and Chael Produciendo)	Nominated	
Premios Tu Música Urbano	2022	Top Song — Christian-Spiritual	"Gracias Remix" (with Pedro Capó)	Won	
Premios Tu Música Urbano	2022	Top Song — Christian-Spiritual	"Incompleto" (with Onell Díaz)	Nominated	
Premios Tu Música Urbano	2022	Album of the Year – Male Artist	La 167	Nominated	
Premios Tu Música Urbano	2023	Top Artist — Male	Himself	Nominated	
Premios Tu Música Urbano	2023	Top Artist — Christian-Spiritual	Himself	Won	
Premios Tu Música Urbano	2023	Top Song — Christian-Spiritual	"Nazareno"	Won	
Premios Tu Música Urbano	2023	Top Song — Christian-Spiritual	"En La Mia (Remix)" (with MC Albertico and Isaias Francotirador)	Nominated	
