= Lo Nuestro Award for Urban Album of the Year =

Latin music award

- Country: United States
- Presented by: Univision
- First award: 2003; 23 years ago
- Final award: 2017; 9 years ago

Highlights
- Most awards: Wisin & Yandel (4)
- Most nominations: Wisin & Yandel (7)
- Website: univision.com/premiolonuestro

The Lo Nuestro Award for Urban Album of the Year is an honor presented annually by American television network Univision at the Lo Nuestro Awards. The accolade was established to recognize the most talented performers in Latin music. Originally, nominees and winners were selected through a voting poll conducted among program directors of Spanish-language radio stations in the United States, as well as based on chart performance on Billboard Latin music charts, with the results being tabulated and certified by the accounting firm Deloitte. However, since 2004, winners have been selected through an online survey. The trophy awarded is shaped in the form of a treble clef.

The award was first presented in 2003 to Is Back by Panamanian performer El General, who also won the following year. Puerto-Rican American reggaeton duo Wisin & Yandel is the most nominated act, with seven nominations, and also are the most awarded, with four wins. Their winning albums Wisin vs. Yandel: Los Extraterrestres (2009), Wisin & Yandel Presentan: La Mente Maestra (with DJ Nesty) (2010), La Revolución: Evolucion (2011), and Líderes (2013), also reached number-one at the Billboard Latin Albums chart. Los Extraterrestres also received the Grammy Award and Latin Grammy Award for Best Urban Music Album. Barrio Fino by Puerto-Rican American rapper Daddy Yankee was awarded the Lo Nuestro for Urban Album of the Year in 2005; with the album Daddy Yankee was the first reggaeton act to debut at the top of the Billboard Latin Albums chart and became the best-selling Latin album of the decade (2000–2010) in the United States. Puerto Rican performer Ivy Queen is the only female artist to win the award, receiving it in 2008 for her album Sentimiento (2007). Puerto-Rican American reggaeton performer Don Omar is the most nominated artist without a win, with five unsuccessful nominations. In 2017, Pretty Boy / Dirty Boy by Colombian artist Maluma became the last award recipient, as in the nominations for the 2019 awards, the category for Urban Album of the Year was not included.

== Winners and nominees ==
Listed below are the winners of the award for each year, as well as the other nominees.

| Key | Meaning |
|---|---|
| ‡ | Indicates the winning album |

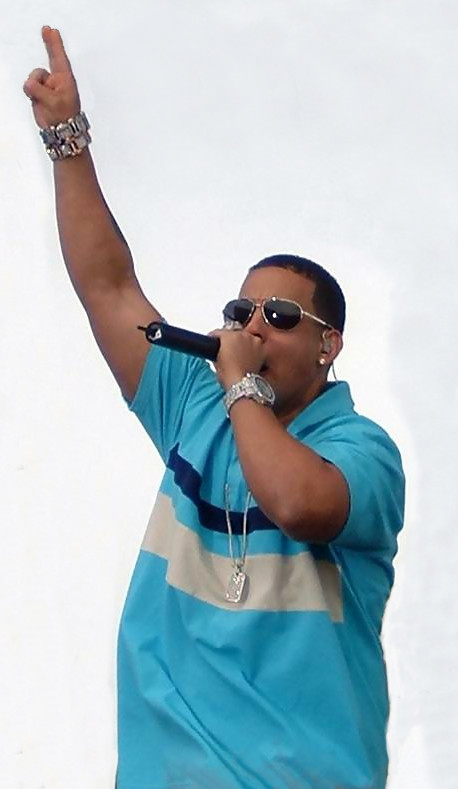
Puerto-Rican American performer Daddy Yankee (pictured in 2006), two-time winner (2005 and 2007)

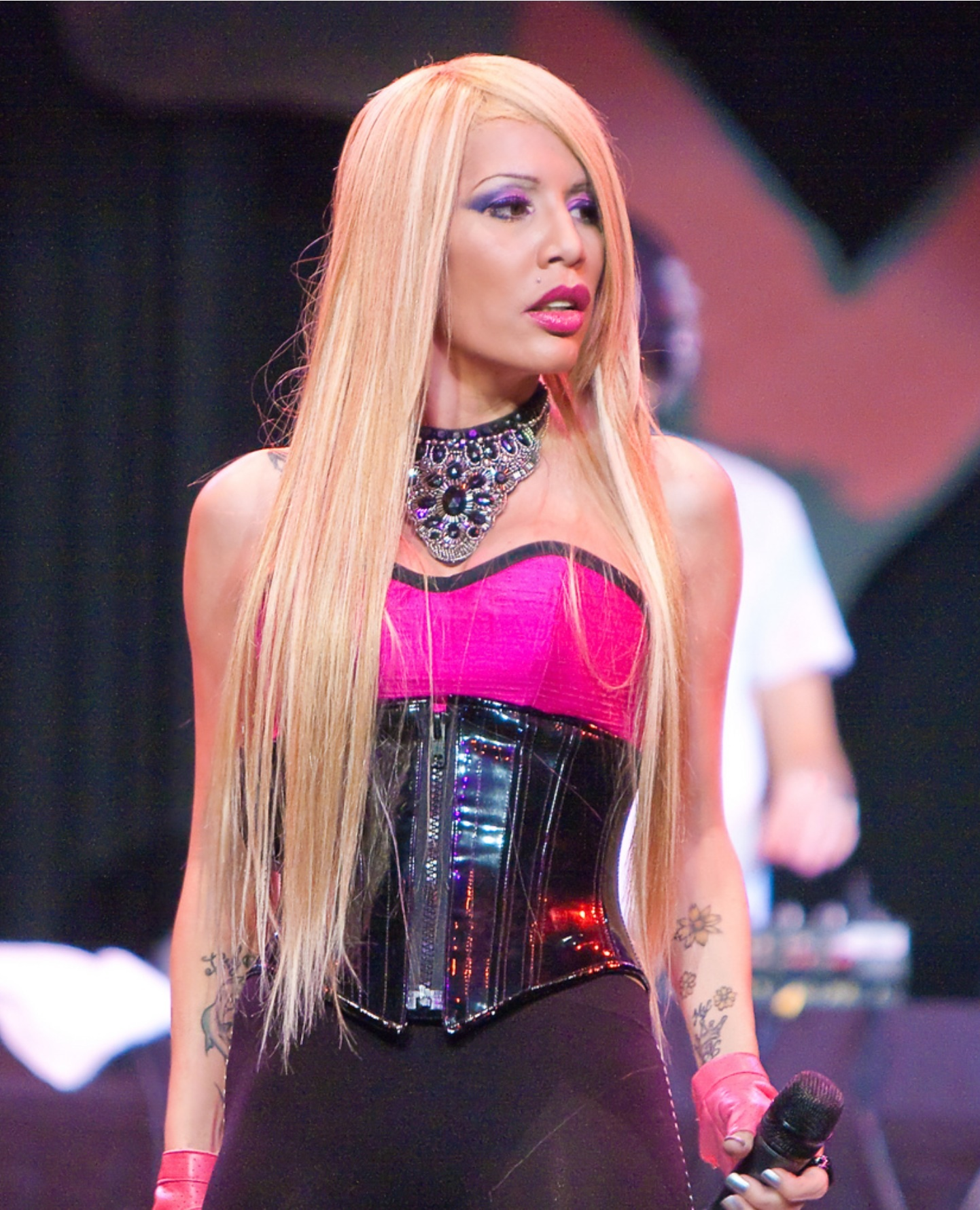
Puerto-Rican American performer Ivy Queen (pictured in 2010), winner in 2008

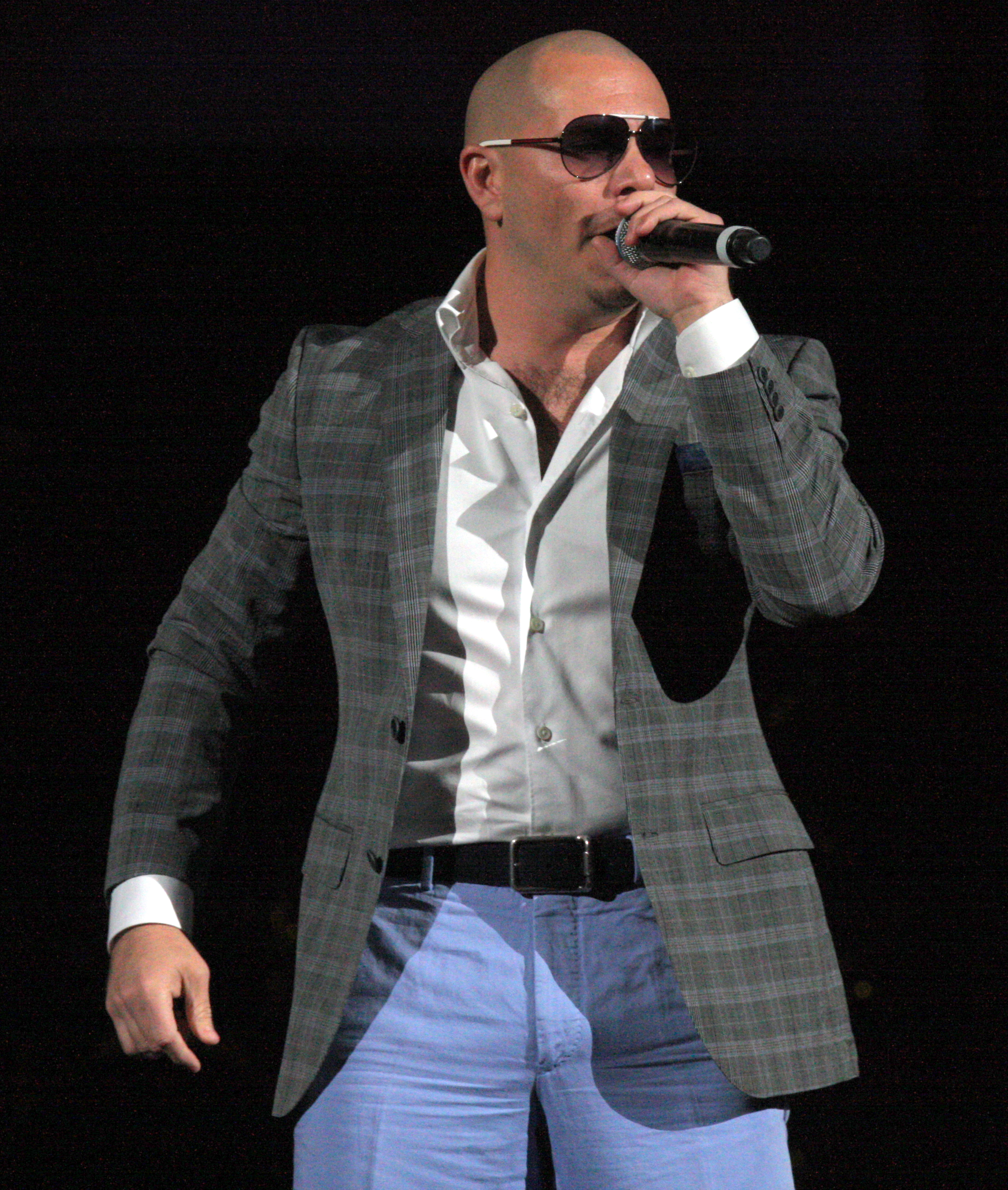
American artist Pitbull (pictured in 2011), winner in 2012

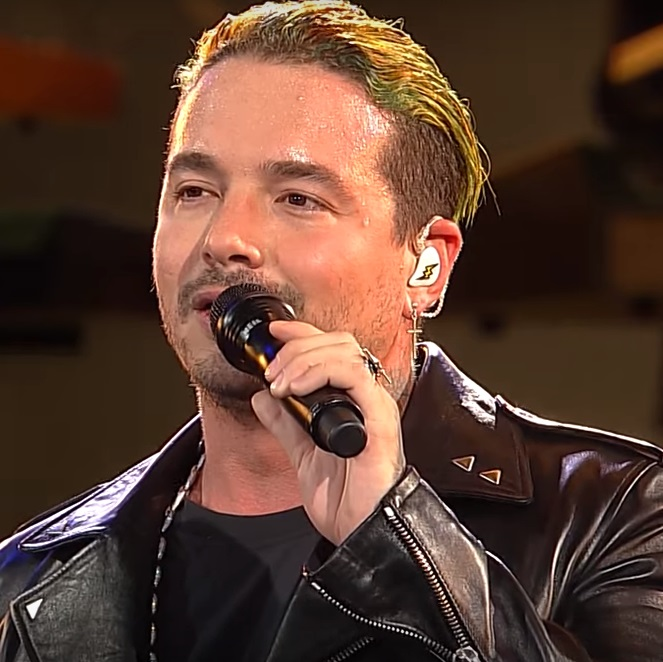
Colombian performer J Balvin (pictured in 2017), two-time winner (2015–2016)

| Year | Album | Performer(s) | Ref |
|---|---|---|---|
| 2003 (15th) | Is Back‡ | El General | |
| 2003 (15th) | Pura Gozadera | Proyecto Uno | |
| 2003 (15th) | Emboscada | Vico C | |
| 2003 (15th) | The Phenomenon | Big Boy | |
| 2003 (15th) | Un Paso a la Eternidad | Sindicato Argentino del Hip Hop | |
| 2004 (16th) | De Fiesta‡ | El General | |
| 2004 (16th) | El Abayarde | Tego Calderón | |
| 2004 (16th) | La Prueba | Magic Juan | |
| 2004 (16th) | Proyecto Akwid | Akwid | |
| 2004 (16th) | ¡Tómala! | Los Tetas | |
| 2005 (17th) | Barrio Fino‡ | Daddy Yankee | |
| 2005 (17th) | DJ Kane | DJ Kane | |
| 2005 (17th) | La Verdad | Fulanito | |
| 2005 (17th) | The Last Don Live | Don Omar | |
| 2005 (17th) | Uno, Dos: Bandera | Control Machete | |
| 2006 (18th) | Mas Flow 2‡ | Luny Tunes & Baby Ranks | |
| 2006 (18th) | Chosen Few II: El Documental | Chosen Few | |
| 2006 (18th) | Desahogo | Vico C | |
| 2006 (18th) | Flow la Discoteka | DJ Nelson | |
| 2006 (18th) | Los K-Becillas | Master Joe & O.G. Black | |
| 2007 (19th) | Barrio Fino en Directo‡ | Daddy Yankee | |
| 2007 (19th) | Flashback | Ivy Queen | |
| 2007 (19th) | Masterpiece | R.K.M & Ken-Y | |
| 2007 (19th) | Pa'l Mundo: Deluxe Edition | Wisin & Yandel | |
| 2007 (19th) | Top of the Line | Tito El Bambino | |
| 2008 (20th) | Sentimiento‡ | Ivy Queen | |
| 2008 (20th) | El Cartel: The Big Boss | Daddy Yankee | |
| 2008 (20th) | Los Vaqueros | Wisin & Yandel | |
| 2008 (20th) | The Perfect Melody | Zion | |
| 2008 (20th) | The Bad Boy | Héctor "El Father" | |
| 2009 (21st) | Wisin vs. Yandel: Los Extraterrestres‡ | Wisin & Yandel | |
| 2009 (21st) | King of Kings: Live | Don Omar | |
| 2009 (21st) | Showtime | Angel & Khriz | |
| 2009 (21st) | Sobrenatural | Alexis & Fido | |
| 2009 (21st) | Te Quiero: Romantic Style in da World | Flex | |
| 2010 (22nd) | Wisin & Yandel Presentan: La Mente Maestra‡ | DJ Nesty featuring Wisin & Yandel | |
| 2010 (22nd) | Down to Earth | Alexis & Fido | |
| 2010 (22nd) | El Patrón | Tito El Bambino | |
| 2010 (22nd) | La Evolución Romantic Style | Flex | |
| 2010 (22nd) | Te Amo | Makano | |
| 2011 (23rd) | La Revolución: Evolucion‡ | Wisin & Yandel | |
| 2011 (23rd) | Da' Take Over | Angel & Khriz | |
| 2011 (23rd) | Mundial | Daddy Yankee | |
| 2011 (23rd) | La Melodía De La Calle: Updated | Tony Dize | |
| 2011 (23rd) | My World | Dyland & Lenny | |
| 2012 (24th) | Armando‡ | Pitbull | |
| 2012 (24th) | Don Omar Presents: Meet the Orphans | Don Omar | |
| 2012 (24th) | Los Vaqueros: El Regreso | Wisin & Yandel | |
| 2012 (24th) | Mi Música | Gocho | |
| 2012 (24th) | Perreología | Alexis & Fido | |
| 2013 (25th) | Líderes‡ | Wisin & Yandel | |
| 2013 (25th) | Don Omar Presents MTO²: New Generation | Don Omar | |
| 2013 (25th) | Juan Magán Presents: Bailando Por El Mundo | Juan Magán | |
| 2013 (25th) | Los Duros | Baby Rasta & Gringo | |
| 2013 (25th) | Prestige | Daddy Yankee | |
| 2014 (26th) | Invicto | Tito El Bambino | |
| 2014 (26th) | Imperio Nazza: J Álvarez Edition | J Alvarez | |
| 2014 (26th) | Los Sucesores | J King & Maximan | |
| 2014 (26th) | My World 2 | Dyland & Lenny | |
| 2015 (27th) | La Familia | J Balvin | |
| 2015 (27th) | De Líder a Leyenda | Yandel | |
| 2015 (27th) | El Regreso del Sobreviviente | Wisin | |
| 2015 (27th) | La Esencia | Alexis & Fido | |
| 2015 (27th) | King Daddy | Daddy Yankee | |
| 2016 (28th) | La Familia B Sides | J Balvin | |
| 2016 (28th) | Alta Jerarquía | Tito El Bambino | |
| 2016 (28th) | Farruko Presenta: Los Menores | Farruko | |
| 2016 (28th) | Greatest Hits, Volume 1 | Nicky Jam | |
| 2016 (28th) | The Last Don II | Don Omar | |
| 2017 (29th) | Pretty Boy / Dirty Boy | Maluma | |
| 2017 (29th) | Dangerous | Yandel | |
| 2017 (29th) | Energía | J Balvin | |
| 2017 (29th) | Los Vaqueros 3: La Trilogía | Wisin | |
| 2017 (29th) | Visionary | Farruko | |
| 2021 (33rd) | YHLQMDLG | Bad Bunny | |
| 2021 (33rd) | 1 of 1 | Sech | |
| 2021 (33rd) | Colores | J Balvin | |
| 2021 (33rd) | Nibiru | Ozuna | |
| 2021 (33rd) | Papi Juancho | Maluma | |
| 2022 (34rd) | El Último Tour Del Mundo | Bad Bunny | |
| 2022 (34rd) | Jose | J Balvin | |
| 2022 (34rd) | KG0516 | Karol G | |
| 2022 (34rd) | La 167 | Farruko | |
| 2022 (34rd) | La Última Promesa | Justin Quiles | |
| 2022 (34rd) | Los Favoritos 2.5 | Arcangel | |
| 2022 (34rd) | Los Legendarios 001 | Los Legendarios | |
| 2022 (34rd) | Nattividad | Natti Natasha | |
| 2022 (34rd) | Timelezz | Jhayco | |
| 2022 (34rd) | Vice Versa | Rauw Alejandro | |
| 2023 (35th) | Un Verano Sin Ti | Bad Bunny | |
| 2023 (35th) | Esquemas | Becky G | |
| 2023 (35th) | La Última Misión | Wisin & Yandel | |
| 2023 (35th) | Las Leyendas Nunca Mueren | Anuel AA | |
| 2023 (35th) | Legendaddy | Daddy Yankee | |
| 2023 (35th) | Lyke Myke | Myke Towers | |
| 2023 (35th) | Motomami | Rosalía | |
| 2023 (35th) | Sauce Boyz 2 | Eladio Carrión | |
| 2023 (35th) | The Love & Sex Tape | Maluma | |
| 2023 (35th) | Versions of Me | Anitta | |

== Multiple wins and nominations ==
| Number | Performer(s) |
Wins
| 4 | Wisin & Yandel |
| 2 | J Balvin |
| 2 | Daddy Yankee |
| 2 | El General |
Nominations
| 7 | Wisin & Yandel |
| 6 | Daddy Yankee |
| 4 | Alexis & Fido |
| 4 | Don Omar |
| 3 | Tito El Bambino |
| 3 | J Balvin |
| 2 | Angel & Khriz |
| 2 | Dyland & Lenny |
| 2 | El General |
| 2 | Farruko |
| 2 | Flex |
| 2 | Ivy Queen |
| 2 | Vico C |
| 2 | Wisin |
| 2 | Yandel |

== See also ==
- Billboard Latin Music Award for Latin Rhythm Album of the Year
- Grammy Award for Best Latin Urban Album
- Grammy Award for Best Latin Rock, Urban or Alternative Album
- Latin Grammy Award for Best Urban Music Album
- Los Premios MTV Latinoamérica for Best Urban Artist
