= List of Billboard Latin Rhythm Albums number ones of 2010 =

The Latin Rhythm Albums chart is a music chart published in Billboard magazine. The data is compiled by Nielsen SoundScan from a sample that includes music stores, music departments at electronics and department stores, internet sales (both physical and digital) and verifiable sales from concert venues in the United States. The chart is composed of studio, live, and compilation releases by Latin artists performing in the Latin hip hop, urban, dance and reggaeton, the most popular Latin Rhythm music genres.

There were ten number-one albums in 2010. Puerto Rican duo Wisin & Yandel's seventh studio album, La Revolución (2009) bowed at the top of the chart for twenty-seven weeks in 2009, before leading the chart for the first fourteen weeks of 2010. The album debuted on the Billboard 200 chart at number seven, selling over 35,000 copies in its first week. It became the "highest debut for a Spanish language recording act since Mana's Amar Es Combatir debuted and peaked at number four in September 2006." This made "Maná and Wisin & Yandel the only artists who record exclusively in Spanish who have made it to the top ten of the Billboard 200." It later was awarded the Billboard Latin Music Award for Latin Rhythm Album of the Year in 2010. Puerto Rican duo Angel & Khriz's third studio album, Da' Take Over (2010) lead the chart for one week in April. The album became the group's first number one set on the Billboard Latin Rhythm Albums chart, debuting at number six and eighteen on the Billboard Latin Albums and Billboard Rap Albums charts, respectively. Puerto Rican performer Ivy Queen's seventh studio album, Drama Queen (2010) sold 3000 copies in its first week, dominating the chart for ten consecutive weeks from July until October. The set debuted at number 163 on the Billboard 200 chart, number eighteen on the Billboard Rap Albums chart, and number three on the Billboard Latin Albums chart. The album gave Queen her second number one on the Latin Rhythm Albums chart, remaining the only female artist to post a number one on the chart until Karol G debuted atop the summit with KG0516 in 2021.

== Albums ==
Chart date	Album	Artist(s)	Reference
January 2	La Revolución	Wisin & Yandel	
January 9	La Revolución	Wisin & Yandel	
January 16	La Revolución	Wisin & Yandel	
January 23	La Revolución	Wisin & Yandel	
January 30	La Revolución	Wisin & Yandel	
February 6	La Revolución	Wisin & Yandel	
February 13	La Revolución	Wisin & Yandel	
February 20	La Revolución	Wisin & Yandel	
February 27	La Revolución	Wisin & Yandel	
March 6	La Revolución	Wisin & Yandel	
March 13	La Revolución	Wisin & Yandel	
March 20	La Revolución	Wisin & Yandel	
March 27	La Revolución	Wisin & Yandel	
April 3	La Revolución	Wisin & Yandel	
April 10	Da' Take Over	Angel & Khriz	
April 17	El Patrón	Tito "El Bambino"	
April 24	Mi Niña Bonita	Chino & Nacho	
May 1	Mi Niña Bonita	Chino & Nacho	
May 8	Mi Niña Bonita	Chino & Nacho	
May 15	Mundial	Daddy Yankee	
May 22	Mundial	Daddy Yankee	
May 29	Mundial	Daddy Yankee	
June 5	Mundial	Daddy Yankee	
June 12	Mundial	Daddy Yankee	
June 19	Mundial	Daddy Yankee	
June 26	Mundial	Daddy Yankee	
July 3	Mundial	Daddy Yankee	
July 10	Mundial	Daddy Yankee	
July 17	Mundial	Daddy Yankee	
July 24	Mi Niña Bonita	Chino & Nacho	
July 31	Drama Queen	Ivy Queen	
August 7	Drama Queen	Ivy Queen	
August 14	Drama Queen	Ivy Queen	
August 21	Drama Queen	Ivy Queen	
August 28	Drama Queen	Ivy Queen	
September 4	Drama Queen	Ivy Queen	
September 11	Drama Queen	Ivy Queen	
September 18	Drama Queen	Ivy Queen	
September 25	Drama Queen	Ivy Queen	
October 2	Drama Queen	Ivy Queen	
October 9	La Revolución: Live: Volume One	Wisin & Yandel	
October 16	La Revolución: Live: Volume One	Wisin & Yandel	
October 23	La Revolución: Live: Volume One	Wisin & Yandel	
October 30	La Revolución: Live: Volume One	Wisin & Yandel	
November 6	El Ultimo Suspiro	Kinto Sol	
November 13	El Ultimo Suspiro	Kinto Sol	
November 20	Armando	Pitbull	
November 27	Armando	Pitbull	
December 4	Don Omar Presents: Meet The Orphans	Don Omar	
December 11	Don Omar Presents: Meet The Orphans	Don Omar	
December 18	Don Omar Presents: Meet The Orphans	Don Omar	
December 25	Don Omar Presents: Meet The Orphans	Don Omar	
