= Me Enamoré =

Me Enamoré may refer to:

- Me Enamoré (album), 1983 album by José Feliciano
- "Me Enamoré" (Shakira song), 2017
- "Me Enamoré", 1997 song by Chichí Peralta
- "Me Enamoré", 2010 song by Angel & Khriz from the album Da' Take Over
