= Wild Dogz =

Puerto Rican record label

- Parent company: Sony BMG Norte (2002-2013) Warner Music Latina (2013-present)
- Founded: 2002; 24 years ago
- Founder: Raúl Alexis Ortíz (Alexis); Joel Martínez (Fido)
- Country of origin: Puerto Rico

Wild Dogz is a Puerto Rican record label founded by Alexis & Fido.

== Artists ==
- Alexis & Fido
- Antony
- Player & Sisso
- Carlitos Prime
- Baroni
- Analise

== Producers ==
- DJ Coffie
- Master Chris
- RKO
- Impulse
- Lenny 357 & Smash (MKP)

== Discography ==
Year	Information
2005	Alexis & Fido - The Pitbulls: Released:November 15, 2005; Singles: "Eso Ehh...!!", "Agárrale El Pantalón" , RIAA certification: Platinum & Oro (Gold)
2006	Alexis & Fido - Los Reyes del Perreo: Released:September 19, 2006; Singles: "Me Quiere Besar"; RIAA certification: —
2007	Alexis & Fido - Sobrenatural: Released:November 13, 2007; Singles: "5 Letras", "Soy Igual Que Tú", "Somos Tal Para Cual", "Sobrenatural"; RIAA certification: Oro (Gold)
2009	Alexis & Fido- Down to Earth: Released: March 31, 2009; Singles: "Ojos Que No Ven", "Mi Música Ehhh", "Bartender", "Muevelo"; RIAA certification: —
2011	Alexis & Fido - Perreología: Released: March 22, 2011; Singles: "Contestame El Telefono" (feat. Flex), "Energia", "Dónde Estés Llegaré"; RIAA certification: —
2012	Alexis & Fido - Piden Perreo... Lo Más Duro: Released: August 21, 2012; Singles: —; RIAA certification: —
2012	Alexis - Wild Dogz: La Corporación (Mixtape): Released: December 25, 2012; Singles: —; RIAA certification: —
2014	Alexis & Fido - La Esencia: Released: March 4, 2014; Singles: —; RIAA certification: —
