= Una en un Millón =

Una en un Millón may refer to:

- "Una en un Millón", a 2021 song by Alacranes Musical
- "Una en un Millón", a 2015 song by Alexis & Fido
- "Una en un Millón", a song by Jerry Rivera from the 1992 album Cuenta Conmigo
- "Una en un Millón", a song by Jesse & Joy from the 2011 album ¿Con Quién Se Queda El Perro?
- "Una en un Millón", a song by Roberto Carlos from the 1991 album Roberto Carlos
- "1 en 1 Millón", a song by Maluma from the 2022 album Marry Me
