= El Incomprendido =

2021 single by Farruko, Victor Cardenas and Dj Adoni

Single by Farruko, Victor Cardenas and Dj Adoni

from the album La 167
- Language: Spanish
- Released: October 1, 2021
- Length: 4:27
- Label: Sony Latin
- Songwriters: Andy Bauza; Carlos Efrén Reyes Rosado; Farruko; Carlos Humberto Domínguez; Eelke A. Kalberg; Franklin Jovani Martínez; Félix Manuel Rodriguez; John P. Ramos Rivera; Johnny Gaitan, Jr.; José Carlos García; Juan Alfredo Díaz; JUAN MANUEL GOMEZ; Marcos G. Pérez; Sebastiaan Molijn; Víctor Alonso Cárdenas Ospina
- Producers: Víctor Alonso Cárdenas Ospina; Marcos G. Pérez (Sharo Towers); José Carlos García (IAmChino); Juan Alfredo Díaz; Carlos Humberto Domínguez

Farruko singles chronology
| "Me Pasé" (2021) | "El Incomprendido" (2021) |

Music video
- "El Incomprendido" on YouTube

"El Incomprendido" (English: "Misunderstood") is a Dembow Guaracha fusion song by Puerto Rican singer-songwriter Farruko and Colombian producer Victor Cardenas and the Dominican Dj Adoni. It was released as single on October 1, 2021, from Farruko's studio album La 167, via Sony Music Latin.

The song's title and opening lines are a homage to one of Puerto Rico's greatest singers, Ismael Rivera, who had a song also called “Incomprendido”, written by Bobby Capó and released in 1972 on the album “Esto Fué Lo Que Trajo El Barco”, under Tico Records.

== Composition ==
The track follows "Pepas" musical style, and remakes Alice Deejay's "Better Off Alone" (1999) and David Guetta's "Play Hard" (2012), and is performed in Spanish. The song is written in the key of B major, with a tempo of 128 beats per minute.

The song's opening bridge and title is a direct reference to “Incomprendido” by Ismael Rivera, one of his most famous songs and one of Puerto Rico's greatest singers. Originally written for Ismael Rivera by another famous Puerto Rican songwriter, Bobby Capo, the song from Farruko interpolates the opening lines of Maelo's hit and also uses it as the bridge.

== Music video ==
An accompanying music video was released on October 1, 2021, The video is recorded "in a kind of open party using a large number of people to do the choreography" that is already going viral on social networks, it has received over 12 million views.

== Charts ==
=== Weekly charts ===
Weekly chart performance for "El Incomprendido"
| Chart (2021–2022) | Peak position |
|---|---|
| Bolivia (Monitor Latino) | 11 |
| France (SNEP) | 29 |
| Spain (Promusicae) | 11 |
| Global 200 (Billboard) | 145 |
| US Hot Dance/Electronic Songs (Billboard) | 4 |
| US Hot Latin Songs (Billboard) | 13 |
| US Latin Airplay (Billboard) | 1 |

=== Year-end charts ===
2021 year-end chart performance for "El Incomprendido"
| Chart (2021) | Position |
|---|---|
| US Hot Dance/Electronic Songs (Billboard) | 43 |

2022 year-end chart performance for "El Incomprendido"
| Chart (2022) | Position |
|---|---|
| Belgium (Ultratop 50 Wallonia) | 169 |
| US Hot Dance/Electronic Songs (Billboard) | 13 |
| US Hot Latin Songs (Billboard) | 51 |

== Certifications ==
Certifications for "El Incomprendido"
| Region | Certification | Certified units/sales |
|---|---|---|
| France (SNEP) | Platinum | 200,000^{‡} |
| Mexico (AMPROFON) | Gold | 70,000^{‡} |
| Portugal (AFP) | Gold | 5,000^{‡} |
| Spain (Promusicae) | 2× Platinum | 120,000^{‡} |
| United States (RIAA) | 5× Platinum (Latin) | 300,000^{‡} |
Streaming
| Central America (CFC) | Gold | 3,500,000^{†} |
^{‡} Sales+streaming figures based on certification alone.^{†} Streaming-only figures based on certification alone.

== See also ==
- List of Billboard Hot Latin Songs and Latin Airplay number ones of 2022
