= Showtime (Angel & Khriz album) =

Studio album by Angel & Khriz
- Released: March 11, 2008
- Recorded: 2007/2008
- Genre: Reggaeton
- Length: 53:55
- Label: Machete Music; V.I. Music
- Producer: Nely "El Arma Secreta"; Tainy; Noriega; Loz Fantaztikoz; Santana; Barbosa; Hyde; Keko

Angel & Khriz chronology
| Los MVP's: Special Edition (2006) | Showtime (2008) | Da' Take Over (2010) |

Showtime is the second album by Angel & Khriz released on March 11, 2008. It was a success with fans and critics, receiving 4.5 stars from AllMusic and reaching No. 18 on the Billboard Top Latin Albums chart.

Showtime was nominated for a Lo Nuestro Award for Urban Album of the Year.

== Track listing ==
1. Intro
2. Que Nos Vean
3. La Vecina
4. Showtime (featuring Zion)
5. Muévela
6. Juguete
7. Tu Aroma
8. Na De Na (featuring Gocho & John Eric)
9. He Tratado
10. Quiere Más
11. Me Pegué - (featuring Montana & Mora)
12. No Me Conoces
13. Pa'l Barrio
14. Va y Ven
15. Carita de Ángel (Version Bachata) (Remix)
16. Carita de Ángel (Album Version) (On the 16 tracks edition)
17. Na De Na (Remix) (featuring Gocho, John Eric, Alexis, Julio Voltio, Arcángel & Franco "El Gorila")

== Charts ==
| Chart (2008) | Peak Position |
|---|---|
| US Top Latin Albums (Billboard) | 18 |
| US Top Heatseekers (Billboard) | 15 |
| US Top Heatseekers (Northeast) (Billboard) | 9 |
| US Top Heatseekers (South Atlantic) (Billboard) | 3 |
| US Latin Rhythm Albums (Billboard) | 4 |
