= Los MVP =

Los MVP's

Studio album by Angel & Khriz
- Released: July 19, 2005; April 18, 2006 (Special Edition)
- Genre: Reggaeton
- Label: MVP Records Luar Records
- Producer: Luny Tunes; Mr. G N.O.T.T.Y; DJ Sonic; Nely "El Arma Secreta"; Gocho; Barbosa; DJ Pablo; Noriega; Ken-Y

Angel & Khriz chronology
Los MVP's (2005)	Showtime (2008)

Los MVP's is the debut album by Angel & Khriz. The album is best known for containing the hit Ven Baílalo. Los MVP's was re-released shortly after the release of MVP 2. It replaced track 12 (Dile Que No) with a new track entitled Fua! from MVP 2 and had a slightly different track order than the original. The album is famous for including the worldwide hit "Ven Bailalo" often considered one of the most famous reggaeton songs in history peaking at #3 on the Billboard Latin charts. The album was well received internationally, receiving a platinum certification from the RIAA for shipping 100,000 copies in the United States.

== Track listing ==
#	Title	Featuring	Producer(s)	Length
1	"Los MVP's"		NOTTY & DJ Sonic	
2	"Vamos Perros"		Luny Tunes & Nely	
3	"De Cazería"	Divino	Nely	
4	"Te Quiero Ver Hoy"		Luny Tunes & Eliel	
5	"Flow de Barrio"		Nely	
6	"Ram..Pa..Pan..Pan"	John Eric	Barbosa & DJ Pablo	
7	"Ven Báilalo"		Luny Tunes & Mr. G	
8	"A Misionar"	Hector "El Father"	Nely	
9	"Todo Te Lo Di"	Angel track only	Barbosa & Noriega	
10	"Nos Vamos Gatitas"		Barbosa & DJ Pablo	
11	"Siéntate"		Barbosa & DJ Pablo	
12	"Dile Que No"		NOTTY & Ken-Y	
13	"Crónicas De Una Super Estrella"	Khriz track only	DJ Sonic	
14	"Ven Baílalo (Bachata-Merengue Mix)"		Luny Tunes & Mr. G	

=== Special Edition ===
#	Title	Featuring	Producer(s)	Length
1	"Fua"		Nely	
2	"Flow De Barrio"		Nely	
3	"De Lao A Lao"	Gocho	Mr. G & Nely	
4	"Te Quiero Ver Hoy"		Luny Tunes & Eliel	
5	"Ram Pa Pan"	John Eric	Barbosa & DJ Pablo	
6	"Los MVP"		Notty & DJ Sonic	
7	"Ven Baílalo"		Mr. G & Luny Tunes	4:09
8	"De Cazeria"	Divino	Nely	
9	"Todo Te Lo Di"	Angel track only	Barbosa (DJ)& Noriega	
10	"A Misionar"	Hector El Father	Nely	
11	"Vamos Perros"		Luny Tunes & Nely	
12	"Sientate"		Barbosa & DJ Pablo	
13	"Crónicas De Una Super Estrella"	Khriz track only	DJ Sonic	
14	"Ven Baílalo (Bachata-Merengue Mix)"		Mr. G & Luny Tunes	3:31
15	"Ven Bailalo/Fua (Video)"			

== Charts ==
Chart (2004)	Peak Position
US Latin Tropical Albums (Billboard)	19
Chart (2005)	Peak Position
US Top Latin Albums (Billboard)	29
US Top Heatseekers (Billboard)	50
US Latin Rhythm Albums (Billboard)	7

== Sales and certifications ==
Region	Certification	Certified units/sales
United States (RIAA)	Platinum (Latin)	100,000^{^}
^{^} Shipments figures based on certification alone.
