= Los Duros: The Mixtape =

Mixtape by Various Artists
- Released: March 24, 2012
- Recorded: 2011–2012
- Genre: Reggaeton
- Length: 1:09:03
- Label: EME Music

Singles from Los Duros: The Mixtape
- 1. "Na Na Na Na Na" Released: November 22, 2011; 2. "Luna Llena" Released: February 28, 2012

Los Duros: The Mixtape is a collaborative mixtape by artists signed to the label EME Music, mainly the stars: Baby Rasta & Gringo, Kendo Kaponi & Bobby "El Lobo Negro" with featured artists such as: Arcángel, Ňengo Flow, Voltio, J Alvarez. This mixtape released March 24, 2012 and was nominated for Urban Album of the Year at the 2013 Lo Nuestro Awards.

== Track listing ==
1	Intro	EME "EL MAGO"		1:25
2	Los Duros	Baby Rasta & Gringo	Pacho & Cirilo, Ňengo Flow, Voltio, Kendo Kaponi & J Alvarez	4:31
3	Perros y Demonios	Kendo Kaponi		3:34
4	Luna Llena	Baby Rasta & Gringo		3:43
5	Así Soy	Kendo Kaponi	J Alvarez	3:45
6	Desnudarte	Bobby "El Lobo Negro"	Jomar "El Caballo Negro"	3:22
7	Ella Quiere	Pacho & Cirilo		3:42
8	Bellaquisimo	Santana "The Golden Boy"	Gotay "El Autentiko" & Lui-G 21+	4:03
9	Piensas En Mi	Baby Rasta & Gringo		3:33
10	Baja El Fronte Mostro	Kendo Kaponi	Arcángel	4:32
11	Se Van a Morir	Baby Rasta & Gringo	Pacho & Cirilo	4:47
12	Veredicto De Muerte	EME "El Mago"	Baby Rasta	5:44
13	Bailame	Gringo	Kendo Kaponi	3:13
14	Pa' Tras	Bobby "El Lobo Negro"	Baby Rasta & Gringo	3:27
15	Y Tu?	Santana "The Golden Boy"	Baby Rasta & Gringo	3:46
16	Seduceme	Bobby "El Lobo Negro"	Baby Rasta	3:25
17	Na Na Na Na Na	Baby Rasta & Gringo		4:25
18	La 40	Kendo Kaponi		4:15
