= La 167 =

Studio album by Farruko
- Released: October 1, 2021
- Recorded: 2020–2021
- Genres: Reggaeton; trap; guaracha; EDM
- Length: 98:31
- Label: Sony Music Latin
- Producers: Sharo Towers; Prida Beats; Eze el Ezeta; K45; Ghetto; IAmChino; Víctor Cárdenas; Dímelo Flow; Izaak; Jvy Boy; K LO K; Elektrikbeat; Iverson; Maya; JC Karo; Jhon El Diver; Noize "El Nuevo Sonido"; BK; Juan Alfredo Díaz; Carlos Humberto Domínguez; J. Cross; Joniel; Zimmi; Jhonny Leandro Cardona; Vladislav Yurivich Polyakov; Mauro Silvino Bertrán; Jordan Mcclure; David Hayle; Alejandro Armes; Nelson Díaz Martínez

Farruko chronology
Gangalee (2019)	La 167 (2021)	Cvrbon Vrmor (C DE: G D.O.N.) (2024)

Singles from La 167
- 1. "La Tóxica" Released: July 24, 2020; 2. "Pepas" Released: June 24, 2021; 3. "El Incomprendido" Released: October 1, 2021

La 167 is the seventh studio album, and eighth overall including the compilation album En Letra de Otro (2019), by Puerto Rican singer Farruko, released on October 1, 2021, through Sony Music Latin. It was produced by Sharo Towers, Prida Beats, Eze el Ezeta, K45, Ghetto, IAmChino, Víctor Cárdenas, Dímelo Flow, Izaak, Jvy Boy, K LO K, Elektrikbeat, Iverson, Maya, JC Karo, Jhon El Diver, Noize, BK, Juan Alfredo Díaz, Carlos Humberto Domínguez, J. Cross, Joniel, Zimmi, Jhonny Leandro Cardona, Vladislav Yurivich Polyakov, Mauro Silvino Bertrán, Jordan Mcclure, David Hayle, Alejandro Armes and Nelson Díaz Martínez.

The album features collaborations with Oneill, Daniel Habif, Jay Wheeler, Dímelo Flow, DJ Adoni, Ñengo Flow, Víctor Cardenas, White Star, J. Cross, Pedro Capó, Gallego, Yomo, Brray, Noriel, Luar La L, Freny Franklin, Lenier, Mavado, India Martínez, Lito MC Cassidy, Myke Towers, Tempo, Secreto "El Famoso Biberón" and Pacho El Antifeka.

At the 22nd Annual Latin Grammy Awards, the song "La Tóxica" was nominated for Best Reggaeton Performance. The album topped the Top Latin Albums chart, being Farruko's fourth number one in the chart, and peaked at number 26 at the Billboard 200 chart, being his highest entry in the chart. It was certified 5× platinum in United States.

== Background ==
The name of the album comes from a highway close to where Farruko grew up in Bayamón, Puerto Rico. On that highway, his grandfather owned a gas station, which is referenced on the cover art for the album. Farruko said that "the 167 is where I grew up, it was the first road that my eyes saw, that touched my legs, there are paths and spaces that mark your life and 167 marked my life". Throughout the album, various influential Latin American singers are referenced like salsa singers Ismael Rivera, who is mentioned in "El Incomprendido", and Hector Lavoe, whose song "Juanito Alimaña" appears in "Pepas", and Mexican singer Paquita la del Barrio, whose song "Rata de dos pasas" is sampled in "Cucaracha". The album also makes nods to Latin American culture like in "Jíbaro", which takes its name from the Puerto Rican slang used to refer to countryside people, and "Baja Cali", named after the Mexican state of Baja California, which includes Mexican slang in its lyrics. Soundwise, the album experiments with a variety of musical genres such as trap in "Ki" and "Cucaracha", EDM in "Embalao" and "El Incomprendido", dancehall in "W.F.M.", reggae in "Jíbaro", regional Mexican music in the corrido-influenced "Baja Cali" and guaracha in "Pepas".

Following the release of the album, Farruko has said that he has considered the possibility of retiring from music, he said that "I started when I was 15 years old and I am already 30 years old, I don't want to have a forced retirement at 40 or 50, I want to leave earlier and leave at my best". To promote the album, Farruko embarked on the La 167 Tour, which spanned through several cities in United States and Puerto Rico, starting in November 2021 and culminating in February 2022 in Chicago.

== Singles ==
The first single for the album was "La Tóxica", released on July 24, 2020. The song peaked at number four on the Hot Latin Songs chart. A remix for the song was later released on October 23, 2020, featuring Jay Wheeler, Myke Towers, Sech and Tempo. The second single was "Pepas", released on June 24, 2021, which topped the Hot Latin Songs and Dance/Electronic Songs charts, being Farruko's first number-one song on both charts. It also peaked at number 25 on the Billboard 100 chart, being his highest appearance in the chart. Additionally, the song charted in several countries in Latin America and Europe such as Honduras, Nicaragua, Paraguay, Peru, Spain and Switzerland. The third single was "El Incomprendido", released on October 1, 2021. All three singles were certified platinum in both Spain and United States, with "Pepas" selling over two million copies in the latter country.

== Track listing ==
La 167 track listing
No.	Title	Writer(s)	Producer(s)	Length
1.	"Ki" (featuring Oneill and Daniel Habif)	Carlos Efrén Reyes Rosado; Andy Bauza; Franklin Jovani Martínez; Marcos G. Pérez; Henry De La Prida; Ezequiel Rivera Pérez; Luis Angel O'Neill	Sharo Towers; Prida Beats; Eze el Ezeta	3:30
2.	"La Tóxica"	Reyes Rosado; Bauza; Martínez; Pérez; O'Neill; Axel Rafael Quezada Fulgencio; Keriel Quiroz; David Sanchez Badillo; Héctor Pagan; Joselly Rosario; Lloyd Willis; Sly Dunbar	Sharo Towers; K45; Ghetto	3:00
3.	"Pepas"	Reyes Rosado; Bauza; Martínez; Pérez; Quezada Fulgencio; Quiroz; José Carlos García; Juan Manuel Gómez; Víctor Alonso Cárdenas Ospina	Sharo Towers; K45; Ghetto; IAmChino; Víctor Cárdenas	4:47
4.	"GPS" (featuring Jay Wheeler)	Reyes Rosado; Bauza; Martínez; Pérez; Quezada Fulgencio; Quiroz; Abner Joel Hernández; José Ángel López Martínez; Néstor Alexander Santana Castillo	Sharo Towers	3:40
5.	"F*LOVE" (featuring Dímelo Flow and DJ Adoni)	Reyes Rosado; Bauza; Martínez; Pérez; Angelo Javier Roca Villagran; Isaac Ortiz; Jorge Valdés; Ramses Ivan Herrera Soto	Sharo Towers; Dímelo Flow; Izaak; Jvy Boy	3:17
6.	"Cucaracha" (featuring Ñengo Flow)	Reyes Rosado; Bauza; Martínez; Pérez; De La Prida; Rivera Pérez; Edwin Rosa Vázquez; Norberto Eduardo Toscano	Prida Beats; Eze el Ezeta	3:29
7.	"Lambo"	Reyes Rosado; Bauza; Martínez; Pérez; Quezada Fulgencio; Quiroz; Hernández; Irving Lorenzo; Jeffrey Atkins; Kendred T. Smith; Santana Castillo; Robert Kelly	Sharo Towers; K45; Ghetto; K LO K	2:42
8.	"My Lova"	Reyes Rosado; Bauza; Martínez; Pérez; Julián Maya Yepes; Luis A. Bermúdez; Michael Sanchez; Rafael Julio Castro Soto	Elektrikbeat; Iverson; Maya	3:35
9.	"Baja Cali"	Reyes Rosado; Bauza; Martínez; Pérez; Quezada Fulgencio; Quiroz; Jorge Campos Bonnin	JC Karo	3:14
10.	"La Perla"	Reyes Rosado; Bauza; Martínez; Pérez; Quezada Fulgencio; Quiroz; Valdés; Ortiz; Daniel Luis Rodriguez; Johnattan Jacob Reyes; Johnny Oscar Lopez Pimental	Dímelo Flow; Jhon El Diver; Noize; BK	3:08
11.	"Cuervos"	Reyes Rosado; Bauza; Martínez; Pérez; De La Prida; Rivera Pérez; Quezada Fulgencio; Quiroz; Hernández; Jerónimo Hernández de la Cruz; Santana Castillo	Sharo Towers; Prida Beats; Eze el Ezeta; K45; Ghetto; K LO K	4:03
12.	"El Incomprendido" (featuring Víctor Cardenas and DJ Adoni)	Reyes Rosado; Bauza; Martínez; Pérez; Gómez; García; Cárdenas Ospina; Carlos Humberto Domínguez; Eelke A. Kalberg^{[a]}; Félix Manuel Rodriguez; John P. Ramos Rivera; Johnny Gaitan Jr.; Juan Alfredo Díaz; Sebastiaan Molijn^{[a]}	Sharo Towers; IAmChino; Juan Alfredo Díaz; Carlos Humberto Domínguez	4:27
13.	"Embalao" (featuring White Star and J. Cross)	Reyes Rosado; Bauza; Martínez; Pérez; Hernández de la Cruz	J. Cross	3:46
14.	"Jíbaro" (featuring Pedro Capó)	Reyes Rosado; Martínez; Pérez; O'Neill; Quezada Fulgencio; Quiroz; Hernández; Andy Clay Cruz Felipe; Santana Castillo; Pedro Capó	Sharo Towers; K45; Ghetto; K LO K	3:09
15.	"$"	Reyes Rosado; Bauza; Martínez; Pérez; Quezada Fulgencio; Quiroz; Hernández de la Cruz; Jesús Manuel Benitez-Hiraldo	Sharo Towers; K45; Ghetto; J. Cross	3:42
16.	"167" (featuring Gallego)	Reyes Rosado; Bauza; Martínez; Pérez; De La Prida; Rivera Pérez; Hernández; Quezada Fulgencio; Quiroz; Santana Castillo; José Raul González "Gallego"; Tite Curet Alonso	Prida Beats; Eze el Ezeta	6:47
17.	"Baya" (featuring Yomo)	Reyes Rosado; Bauza; Martínez; Pérez; Arnaldo Santos Pérez; Héctor Luis Delgado; Benitez-Hiraldo; José Alberto Torres; Víctor Manuel Mercado Cruz	Sharo Towers	3:35
18.	"Doble L" (featuring Brray and Noriel)	Reyes Rosado; Bauza; Martínez; Bryan García Quiñones; Jadiel Jesús Núnez Oliveras; Jonathan Rodríguez Cruz; Kenneth Alejandro Vargas Pérez; Noel Santos Román	Joniel; Zimmi	3:24
19.	"Guerrero" (featuring Luar La L)	Reyes Rosado; Bauza; Martínez; Pérez; Hernández; Quezada Fulgencio; Santana Castillo; Raúl Del Valle Robles	Ghetto; K LO K	5:57
20.	"Amigos Nuevos No" (featuring Freny Franklin)	Reyes Rosado; Martínez; Pérez; Eric Omar Rosario Ferrer; Jhonny Leandro Cardona; Vladislav Yurivich Polyakov	Jhonny Leandro Cardona; Vladislav Yurivich Polyakov	3:46
21.	"La Bendición" (featuring Lenier)	Reyes Rosado; Martínez; Pérez; Quezada Fulgencio; Quiroz; Álbaro Mesa; Alejandro Lima; José Carlos García; Mauro Silvino Bertrán; Michael Calderón	IAmChino; Mauro Silvino Bertrán	3:14
22.	"W.F.M." (featuring Mavado)	Reyes Rosado; Bauza; Martínez; Pérez; Hernández; Santana Castillo; David Constantine Brooks; David Hayle; Jordan Mcclure	Jordan Mcclure; David Hayle	3:13
23.	"Apunta y Dispara" (featuring India Martínez and Lito MC Cassidy)	Reyes Rosado; Martínez; Pérez; De La Prida; Rivera Pérez; Jenifer Yesica Martínez Fernández; O'Neill; Rafael Sierra Pascual	Sharo Towers; Prida Beats; Eze el Ezeta	4:43
24.	"Siempre Seré" (featuring Myke Towers, Tempo, Secreto "El Famoso Biberón" and Pacho El Antifeka)	Reyes Rosado; Bauza; Martínez; Pérez; De La Prida; Quezada Fulgencio; Quiroz; David Sánchez Badillo; Michael Torres Monge; Neftalí Álvarez; Odalis Pérez Vicioso	Sharo Towers; KG4; Ghetto	6:38
25.	"Helicóptero"	Reyes Rosado; Bauza; Martínez; Pérez; Alejandro Armes; Nelson Díaz Martínez	Sharo Towers; Alejandro Armes; Nelson Díaz Martínez	3:46
Total length:				98:31

=== Sample credits ===
- ^{^[a]} "El Incomprendido" interpolates "Better Off Alone", written by Sebastiaan Molijn and Eelke Kahlberg, performed by Alice Deejay.

== Credits ==
=== Musicians ===
- Farruko – lead artist, composition (all tracks)
- Oneill – vocals (track 1), composition (tracks 1–2, 14, 22)
- Daniel Habif – vocals (track 1)
- Jay Wheeler – vocals, composition (track 4)
- Dímelo Flow – vocals (track 5)
- DJ Adoni – vocals (track 5, 12)
- Ñengo Flow – vocals, composition (track 6)
- Abraham Elías Dubarrán – guitar (track 11)
- Victor Cardenas – vocals (track 12)
- White Star – vocals (track 13)
- J. Cross – vocals (track 13)
- Pedro Capó – vocals, composition (track 14)
- Gallego – vocals, composition (track 16)
- Yomo – vocals, composition (track 17)
- Brray – vocals, composition (track 18)
- Noriel – vocals, composition (track 18)
- Luar La L – vocals, composition (track 19)
- Sebastian Graux – guitar (track 19)
- Fresy Franklin – vocals (track 20)
- Lenier – vocals (track 21)
- Adrian Gutierrez – keyboards (track 21)
- Mavado – vocals, composition (track 22)
- India Martinez – vocals, composition (track 23)
- Lito MC Cassidy – vocals, composition (track 23)
- Myke Towers – vocals, composition (track 24)
- Tempo – vocals, composition (track 24)
- Secreto "El Famoso Biberón" – vocals, composition (track 24)
- Pacho El Antifeka – vocals, composition (track 24)

=== Technical ===
- Sharo Towers – production (tracks 1–7, 11–15, 17, 23–25), mixing (all tracks), performance arranging (tracks 1–2, 4–17, 18, 20, 23–25), recording engineering (tracks 1–15, 17–18, 20, 23–24), executive production (tracks 2-25), composition (tracks 1–17, 19–21, 23–25)
- Prida Beats – production (tracks 1, 6, 11, 16, 23), composition (tracks 1, 6, 11, 16, 23–24), performance arranging (tracks 23–24), mixing (track 23)
- Eze el Ezeta – production (tracks 1, 6, 11, 16, 23), composition (tracks 1, 6, 11, 16, 23), performance arranging (track 23)
- Ghetto – production (tracks 2–3, 7, 11, 14–15, 19, 24), performance arranging (tracks 1–2, 4, 7–11, 14–16, 18–19, 24), composition (tracks 2–4, 7–11, 15–16, 19, 21, 24), recording engineering (tracks 4, 7–9, 13–14, 16, 21), mixing (track 18)
- K4G – production (tracks 2–3, 7, 11, 14–15), performance arranging (tracks 1–2, 4, 6–11, 14–16, 18), composition (tracks 2–4, 7, 9–11, 14–16, 21, 24), mixing (track 18)
- IAmChino – production (tracks 3, 12, 21), composition (tracks 3, 12, 21)
- Víctor Cárdenas – production (tracks 3, 12), composition (tracks 3, 12)
- Dímelo Flow – production (tracks 5, 10), performance arranging (track 5), recording engineering (track 5), composition (tracks 5, 10)
- Izaak – production (track 5), performance arranging (track 5), composition (tracks 5, 10)
- Jvy Boy – production (track 5), performance arranging (track 5), composition (track 5)
- K LO K – production (tracks 7, 11, 14, 19, 24), mixing (tracks 1, 4-22, 24, 25), performance arranging (tracks 1, 4, 6–9, 11, 14, 16, 19, 24, 25), composition (tracks 4, 7, 14, 16, 19, 22), recording engineering (tracks 6, 11, 19, 25)
- Elektrikbeat – production, composition (track 8)
- Iverson – production, composition (track 8)
- Maya – production, composition (track 8)
- JC Karo – production, composition (track 9)
- Jhon El Diver – production, composition (track 10)
- Noize – production, composition (track 10)
- BK – production, composition (track 10)
- J. Cross – production (tracks 13, 15), composition (tracks 11, 13, 15), performance arranging (tracks 13–14), recording engineering (track 13)
- Joniel – production, composition (track 18)
- Zimmi – production, composition (track 18)
- Jhonny Leandro Cardona – production, composition (track 20)
- Vladislav Yurivich Polyakov – production, composition (track 20)
- Mauro Silvino Bertrán – production, performance arranging, composition, recording engineering (track 21)
- Jordan McClure – production, composition, performance arranging, recording engeenering (track 22)
- David Hayle – production, composition, performance arranging, recording engeenering (track 22)
- Alejandro Armes – production, composition (track 25)
- Nelson Díaz Martínez – production, composition (track 25)
- Franklin Jovani Martinez – composition (all tracks)
- Andy "White Star" Bauza – composition (tracks 1–19, 22, 24–25), recording engineering (tracks 3, 10), performance arranging (track 6)
- Sly Dunbar – composition (track 2)
- Lloyd Willis – composition (track 2)
- Joselly Rosario – composition (track 2)
- Héctor L. Pagán – composition (track 2)
- David Sánchez Badillo – composition (track 2)
- Juan Manuel Gómez – composition (track 3)
- José Carlos García – composition (track 3)
- Abner Joel Hernández – composition (tracks 4, 7, 10, 14, 16, 19, 22)
- Ramses Iván Herrera Soto – composition (track 5)
- Edwin Rosa Vázquez – composition (track 6)
- Norberto Eduardo Toscano – composition (track 6)
- Robert Kelly – composition (track 7)
- Jeffrey Atkins – composition (track 7)
- Irving Lorenzo – composition (track 7)
- Kendred T. Smith – composition (track 7)
- Luis A. Bermúdez – composition (track 8)
- Juan Alfredo Díaz – composition (track 12)
- Carlos Humberto Domínguez – composition (track 12)
- Johnny Gaitan Jr. – composition (track 12)
- Juan Manuel Gómez – composition (track 12)
- John P. Ramos Rivera – composition (track 12)
- Eelke A. Kalberg – composition (track 12)
- Sebastiaan Molijn – composition (track 12)
- Félix Manuel Rodriguez – composition (track 12)
- Jesús Manuel Benítez Hiraldo – composition (track 15)
- Tite Curet Alonso – composition (track 16)
- Víctor Manuel Mercado Cruz – composition (track 17)
- Jesús Manuel Benítez Hiraldo – composition (track 17)
- Héctor Luis Delgado – composition (track 17)
- Arnaldo Santos Perez – composition (track 17)
- Kenneth Alejandro Vargas Pérez – composition (track 18)
- Eric Omar Rosario Ferrer – composition (track 20)
- Albaro Mesa – composition (track 21)
- Michael Calderon – composition (track 21)
- Alejandro Lima – composition (track 21)
- George Noriega – vocal production (track 14)
- Michael Fuller – mastering (all tracks)
- Franklin Martínez – executive producer (all tracks)

== Charts ==
=== Weekly charts ===
Weekly chart performance for La 167
Chart (2021)	Peak position
French Albums (SNEP)	51
Italian Albums (FIMI)	89
Dutch Albums (Album Top 100)	40
Spanish Albums (Promusicae)	23
US Billboard 200	26
US Top Latin Albums (Billboard)	1
US Latin Rhythm Albums (Billboard)	1

=== Year-end charts ===
Year-end chart performance for La 167
Chart (2021)	Position
French Albums (SNEP)	122

== Certifications ==
Certifications for La 167
Region	Certification	Certified units/sales
Mexico (AMPROFON)	Platinum+Gold	210,000^{‡}
Poland (ZPAV)	Platinum	20,000^{‡}
United States (RIAA)	5× Platinum (Latin)	300,000^{‡}
Streaming
Central America (CFC)	Platinum	7,000,000^{†}
^{‡} Sales+streaming figures based on certification alone.^{†} Streaming-only figures based on certification alone.

== See also ==
- 2021 in Latin music
- List of number-one Billboard Latin Albums from the 2020s
