= Down to Earth (Alexis & Fido album) =

Studio album by Alexis & Fido
- Released: March 31, 2009
- Recorded: 2008–2009
- Genre: Reggaeton
- Label: Sony Latin; Wild Dogz
- Producer: Tainy, Master Chris, Hyde, Nely el Arma Secreta, Doble A & Nales "Los Presidentes", Mambo Kingz, Gómez, Yai & Toly, Nesty la Mente Maestra, Victor "El Nazi", Urba

Alexis & Fido chronology
Sobrenatural (2007)	Down to Earth (2009)	Perreología (2011)

Singles from Down to Earth
- 1. "Ojos Que No Ven" Released: February 10, 2009; 2. "Mi Música Ehhh…" Released: July 15, 2009; 3. "Bartender" Released: September 13, 2009; 4. "Muevelo" Released: January 4, 2010

Down to Earth is the fourth studio album by the Puerto Rican reggaeton duo Alexis & Fido released on March 31, 2009 through Sony Music Latin and Wild Dogz. Being produced since 2008, the album follows the success of Sobrenatural, and contains collaborations of artists such Toby Love and Don Omar.

Though "Superheroe" enjoyed massive airplay and success in Latin America and was included in Down to Earth, the official lead single off the album was "Ojos Que No Ven", which also performed successfully in airplay. The buzz single "Gatubela" was released together with the second single off the album: "Bartender". To date, "Bartender" is the most successful song of the duo, and one of the most successful songs of 2009, reaching the number-one position in several countries. The following singles of the album were "No Debe Tocarte" and "Invencibles", which performed well in some countries. It was nominated for a Lo Nuestro Award for Urban Album of the Year.

== Development ==
The album began producing in mid-to-late 2008, when their first album's single were released, "Subete" (that also had a remix version with Puerto Rican reggaeton singer Don Omar). The single wasn't as successful as expected, so the album promotion were moved to 2009, when its second single "Ojos Que No Ven" were released, being the first hit off the album.

== Track listing ==
1. "Muévelo" (produced by Tainy) – 2:54
2. "Mi Música Ehh" (produced by Mambo Kingz) – 3:24
3. "Gatúbela" (produced by Nely) – 3:54
4. "La Cama Pt. 2" (produced by Doble A & Nales) – 3:04
5. "Ojos Que No Ven" (produced by Tainy) – 3:14
6. "No Debe Tocarte" (Ft. Toby Love) (produced by Gómez) – 3:56
7. "Invencibles" (produced by Doble A & Nales) – 3:13
8. "Súbete (Official Remix)" (Ft. Don Omar) (produced by Tainy, DJ Urba & Nales) – 3:25
9. "Me Sale en To's Lao" (produced by Nely) – 3:09
10. "Bartender" (produced by Tainy) – 2:56
11. "Vienen por Ahí" (produced by Yai & Toly) – 2:26
12. "Copycat" (produced by Nely) – 2:52
13. "Superhéroe" (produced by Nesty and Victor) – 3:29
14. "Súbete" (Radio Edit) (produced by Tainy and Doble A & Nales) – 3:17
- Track No. 13 was taken from the album Wisin & Yandel Presentan: La Mente Maestra.

== Charts ==
=== Weekly charts ===
Chart (2009)	Peak position
US Top Latin Albums (Billboard)	5
US Latin Rhythm Albums (Billboard)	2

=== Year-end charts ===
Chart (2009)	Position
US Top Latin Albums (Billboard)	67
