= Pacho El Antifeka =

Puerto Rican rapper (1981–2023)

Neftalí Álvarez Núñez (March 24, 1981, Cataño, Puerto Rico – June 1, 2023, Bayamón, Puerto Rico), known professionally as Pacho Al Qaedas and Pacho El Antifeka, was a Puerto Rican rapper known for having been part of the duo Pacho & Cirilo.

== Career ==
El Antifeka was part of the duo Pacho y Cirilo. In 2018, he recorded "Como Soy" under the name Pacho Al-Qaeda, with Daddy Yankee and Bad Bunny.

In March 2021, he collaborated with Wisin & Yandel and Jay Wheeler on the single "No Te Veo Remix". In 2021, he performed with Ovi. His discography includes the singles "Olvídate de Él" with Alex Rose, "Triste" with Nicky Jam, and "Qué Ser?" with Nio Garcia and Casper Magico.

In October 2021, he released his first single, "All Star Game", with Lunay under the label Duars Entertainment. The music video was filmed in Miami and directed by Gus Camacho.

== Personal life and death ==
In 2015, Álvarez Núñez resided at the Juana Matos housing project in Cataño, Puerto Rico. In March 2015, he pleaded guilty to a two-count federal indictment charging him with possession of a firearm and ammunition by an unlawful user of a controlled substance and possession of a machine gun. He was sentenced in August 2015.

In the early morning hours of June 1, 2023, he was fatally shot at the Plaza Tropical shopping center in Bayamón, Puerto Rico. He was 42 years old. No arrests have been made confirmed according to the Puerto Rico Police Bureau. He was buried at the Cementerio Porta Coeli in Bayamón, Puerto Rico.

=== Albums ===
- All-Star Game (2021)
