= Sobrenatural (album) =

Studio album by Alexis & Fido
- Released: November 13, 2007
- Recorded: 2007
- Genre: Reggaeton
- Labels: Sony BMG Norte; Wild Dogz
- Producers: Doble A & Nales "Los Presidentes"(Co-exec.); Hednokers; Mambo Kingz; Miki "La Mano Bionica"; Scarlito; Squad Up Productions

Alexis & Fido chronology
Los Reyes del Perreo (2006)	Sobrenatural (2007)	Down To Earth (2010)

Singles from Sobrenatural
- 1. "5 Letras" Released: 2007; 2. "Soy Igual Que Tú" Released: 2007; 3. "Somos Tal Para Cual" Released: 2008; 4. "Sobrenatural" Released: 2008

Sobrenatural (English: Supernatural) is the Latin Grammy-nominated second / third studio album by Puerto Rican reggaeton duo Alexis & Fido released on November 13, 2007 by Sony BMG Norte and Wild Dogz. The first single from the album is titled "5 Letras" and is produced by Doble A & Nales "Los Presidentes". Artists featured on the album are Ñejo & Dalmata, Toby Love, De la Ghetto, Julio Voltio, Jadiel, Erick Right and Los Yetzons, a duo signed on to their Wild Dogz label. Doble A & Nales "Los Presidentes" produced the bulk of the album. Sobrenatural was nominated for a Lo Nuestro Award for Urban Album of the Year.

The album was supported with the Sobrenatural Tour. Eventually, the album sold over 100,000 copies.

== Track listing ==
#	Title	Production credits	Length
1	"Si Me Matan (Intro)" (Alexis featuring Voltio, Sofla, De la Ghetto, Lapiz Conciente, Jadiel & Luis Vargas)	Doble A & Nales, Miki 'La Mano Biónica'	5:38
2	"5 Letras"	Doble A & Nales	3:15
3	"A Que No Me Duras"	Doble A & Nales	2:48
4	"Somos Tal Para Cual" (featuring Los Yetzons)	Doble A & Nales	3:35
5	"Sobrenatural"	Doble A & Nales	3:00
6	"Soy Igual Que Tú" (featuring Toby Love)	Doble A & Nales	3:44
7	"Métele Mijo"	Doble A & Nales	3:23
8	"Lento, Lento, Lento"	Mambo Kingz	3:34
9	"Go Go Girls" (featuring Erick Right)	Eddie Pérez "Scarlito"	4:41
10	"Olvídate De'so" (featuring Ñejo & Dalmata)	Headnockers	3:22
11	"Dale Uso"	Doble A & Nales	3:07
12	"Yo Sé Lo Que Tú Das (Te Conozco)"	Mambo Kingz	2:56
13	"Tumba El Fronte"	Doble A & Nales, Miki 'La Mano Biónica'	2:59
14	"We Belong Together" (performed by Los Yetzons)	Eddie Pérez "Scarlito"	3:15

== Tour ==
The album was support by The Sobrenatural Tour, which started with the song "5 letras" and ended with the song "Sobrenatural." The show featured fire, screens, pyrotechnics and dancers plus DJ. Their opening act featured "Los Yetzon," a group of singers who were friends of them.

== Charts ==
=== Weekly charts ===
Chart (2007)	Peak position
US Top Latin Albums (Billboard)	11
US Latin Rhythm Albums (Billboard)	2

=== Year-end charts ===
Chart (2008)	Position
US Top Latin Albums (Billboard)	53

== Sales and certifications ==
Region	Certification	Certified units/sales
United States (RIAA)	Gold (Latin)	50,000^{^}
^{^} Shipments figures based on certification alone.

== Nominations ==
- The duo received 2 Latin Grammy Awards nominations for Best Urban Music Album for Sobrenatural and Best Urban Song for Soy Igual Que Tú.
