= Perreología =

Studio album by Alexis & Fido
- Released: March 22, 2011
- Genre: Reggaeton
- Labels: Sony Latin; Wild Dogz

Alexis & Fido chronology
Down To Earth (2009)	Perreología (2011)	La Esencia (2014)

Singles from Perreología
- 1. "Contestame el Teléfono" Released: January 23, 2011; 2. "Energía" Released: February 11, 2011; 3. "Donde Estés Llegaré" Released: June 29, 2011

Perreología is the fifth studio album by the Puerto Rican reggaeton duo Alexis & Fido, released on March 22, 2011, through Sony Music Latin and Wild Dogz. It was nominated for a Lo Nuestro Award for Urban Album of the Year.

It debuted at number 10 on the Billboard Top Latin Albums chart.

== Track listing ==
1-19 is as listed below

1. La Intellectual
2. Blam Blam (feat. Cosculluela)
3. Deja Ver (feat. Tony Dize)
4. Rescate (feat. Daddy Yankee)
5. Contestame el Teléfono (feat. Flex)
6. Energía
7. La Trampa (feat. Eddie Avila)
8. Donde Estés Llegaré
9. Yo Sé Que Quieres (feat. Nova & Jory)
10. Como el Primer Beso
11. Bailando La Encontré
12. Camuflaje
13. Zombie (feat. Yaviah)
14. Mala Conducta (feat. Franco El Gorila)
15. Blam Blam (feat. Cosculluela, Ñengo Flow)
16. Energía
17. Donde Estés Llegaré
18. Camuflaje
19. Mala Conducta (feat. Franco El Gorila)

== Singles ==
- Rescate (feat. Daddy Yankee)
- Contestame el Teléfono (feat. Flex)
- Energía
- Donde Estés Llegaré
- Camuflaje

== Charts ==
=== Weekly charts ===
Chart (2011)	Peak position
US Billboard 200	192
US Top Latin Albums (Billboard)	10
US Latin Rhythm Albums (Billboard)	2

=== Year-end charts ===
Chart (2011)	Position
US Top Latin Albums (Billboard)	55

== Sales and certifications ==
Region	Certification	Certified units/sales
United States (RIAA)	Gold (Latin)	30,000^{^}
^{^} Shipments figures based on certification alone.
