= La Esencia =

Studio album by Alexis & Fido
- Released: March 4, 2014
- Recorded: 2013–2014
- Genre: Reggaeton
- Label: Wild Dogz; Warner Latina

Alexis & Fido chronology
Perreología (2011)	La Esencia (2014)

Singles from La Esencia
- 1. "Rompe la Cintura" Released: April 19, 2013; 2. "Alócate" Released: December 19, 2013; 3. "Imagínate" Released: June 13, 2014

La Esencia is the sixth studio album by the Puerto Rican reggaeton duo Alexis & Fido released on March 4, 2014 through Wild Dogz and Warner Music Latina. At the Latin Grammy Awards of 2014, the album received a nomination for Best Music Urban Album. La Esencia received a nomination for a Lo Nuestro Award for Urban Album of the Year.

== Track listing ==
1. Imagínate - 4:11
2. Salvaje (feat. Plan B) - 4:00
3. Algaretismo - 4:08
4. Sudao (feat. Zion & Lennox) - 3:50
5. Santa de Mi Devoción - 4:10
6. Alócate - 3:40
7. Juiciosa (feat. J Álvarez) - 3:51
8. Todo Quedó en el Olvido - 4:54
9. Malas Influencias (feat. Yomo) - 3:41
10. Cazadora - 3:48
11. Hazme Tuyo - 3:48
12. Doble Castigo (feat. Franco el Gorila) - 3:33
13. Si Te Faltara - 3:27
14. Aquí Es Que Ehh (feat. Tego Calderón) - 3:41
15. Rompe la Cintura - 3:58
16. Soltura (digital only) - 3:14

=== World Edition ===
1. A Ti Te Encanta - 3:33
2. Ya Era Hora (feat. Farruko) - 3:34
3. Problemático (feat. Gotay) - 3:18
4. Algaretismo (Remix) (feat. Arcángel & De la Ghetto) - 4:31
5. Santa de Mi Devoción - 4:10
6. Imagínate (Remix) (feat. Maluma) - 3:49
7. Salvaje (feat. Plan B) - 4:00
8. Sudao (feat. Zion & Lennox) - 3:50
9. Cazadora - 3:48
10. Juiciosa (feat. J Álvarez) - 3:51
11. Hazme Tuyo - 3:48
12. Aquí Es Que Ehh (feat. Tego Calderón) - 3:41
13. Rompe la Cintura - 3:58
14. Alócate (Tropical Version) - 3:49

== Charts ==
Chart (2014)	Peak position
US Top Latin Albums (Billboard)	5
US Latin Rhythm Albums (Billboard)	1
US Top Rap Albums (Billboard)	24
