= Pepas =

2021 single by Farruko

Single by Farruko

from the album La 167
- Language: Spanish
- Released: June 24, 2021
- Recorded: 2020
- Genre: Guaracha electronica
- Length: 4:47
- Label: Sony Latin
- Songwriters: Andy Bauza; Axel Rafael Quezada Fulgencio (Ghetto); Farruko; Franklin Jovani Martínez; José Carlos García; Juan Manuel Gómez; Keriel Quiroz (K4G); Marcos G. Pérez (Sharo Towers); Víctor Alonso Cárdenas
- Producers: José Carlos García; Víctor Alonso Cárdenas; Marcos G. Pérez (Sharo Towers); Keriel Quiroz (K4G); Axel Rafael Quezada Fulgencio (Ghetto)

Farruko singles chronology
"Aire" (2021)	"Pepas" (2021)	"Me Pasé" (2021)

Audio sample
- A 22-second sample of "Pepas", described as a Guaracha-EDM summer anthem.: file; help

Music video
- "Pepas" on YouTube

"Pepas" is a song recorded by Puerto Rican rapper and singer-songwriter Farruko for his seventh (eighth overall) studio album La 167. It was released as a single on June 24, 2021, via Sony Music Latin. It reached No. 25 on the US Billboard Hot 100 and number one on the US Hot Dance/Electronic Songs chart, becoming Farruko's highest-charting single to date. An official remix was released by David Guetta.

== Background ==
Farruko called the song a "total experiment". He gathered a few people in the studio and asked them to sing a stadium chant that sounded similar to a church choir.

== Composition ==
"Pepas" starts off slow, then quickly picks up and morphs into something "reminiscent of pre-COVID-19 pandemic dance parties".

== Music video ==
The music video was directed by Mike Ho and released on August 6, 2021. According to a description by Jessica Roiz of Billboard, it includes "an all-night-long rave with fireworks, dancers, men dressed in neon suits, and Farruko dancing on top of shipping containers".

== Charts ==
=== Weekly charts ===
2021–2023 weekly chart performance for "Pepas"
Chart (2021–2023)	Peak position
Argentina Hot 100 (Billboard)	3
Austria (Ö3 Austria Top 40)	9
Belarus Airplay (TopHit)	181
Belgium (Ultratop 50 Flanders)	2
Belgium (Ultratop 50 Wallonia)	3
Bolivia (Monitor Latino)	3
Canada Hot 100 (Billboard)	23
Canada AC (Billboard)	23
Canada CHR/Top 40 (Billboard)	32
Canada Hot AC (Billboard)	50
Chile (Monitor Latino)	7
CIS Airplay (TopHit)	30
Colombia (Monitor Latino)	8
Colombia (National-Report)	2
Costa Rica (Monitor Latino)	4
Croatia (Billboard)	21
Czech Republic Airplay (ČNS IFPI)	34
Czech Republic Singles Digital (ČNS IFPI)	19
Denmark (Tracklisten)	12
Dominican Republic (SODINPRO)	3
Dominican Republic (Monitor Latino)	4
Ecuador (Monitor Latino)	2
El Salvador (Monitor Latino)	1
France (SNEP)	3
Germany (GfK)	11
Global 200 (Billboard)	7
Greece International (IFPI)	8
Guatemala (Monitor Latino)	5
Honduras (Monitor Latino)	1
Hungary (Dance Top 40)	1
Hungary (Rádiós Top 40)	1
Hungary (Single Top 40)	4
Hungary (Stream Top 40)	5
Iceland (Tónlistinn)	4
Ireland (IRMA)	79
Israel International Airplay (Media Forest)	1
Italy (FIMI)	5
Latvia Airplay (TopHit)	122
Lithuania (AGATA)	20
Luxembourg (Billboard)	4
Mexican Streaming (AMPROFON)	2
Mexico Airplay (Billboard)	28
Netherlands (Dutch Top 40)	2
Netherlands (Single Top 100)	1
Nicaragua (Monitor Latino)	1
Norway (VG-lista)	17
Panama (Monitor Latino)	7
Paraguay (Monitor Latino)	3
Peru (Monitor Latino)	1
Poland Airplay (ZPAV)	28
Portugal (AFP)	1
Romania Airplay (UPFR)	1
Russia Airplay (TopHit)	30
San Marino Airplay (SMRTV Top 50)	29
Slovakia Airplay (ČNS IFPI)	7
Slovakia Singles Digital (ČNS IFPI)	6
Spain (Promusicae)	1
Suriname (Nationale Top 40)	1
Sweden (Sverigetopplistan)	20
Switzerland (Schweizer Hitparade)	1
Uruguay (Monitor Latino)	12
US Billboard Hot 100	25
US Hot Dance/Electronic Songs (Billboard)	1
US Hot Latin Songs (Billboard)	1
US Latin Airplay (Billboard)	1
US Pop Airplay (Billboard)	34
US Rhythmic Airplay (Billboard)	14
US Airplay (Monitor Latino)	19
Venezuela (Monitor Latino)	8

2024 weekly chart performance for "Pepas"
Chart (2024)	Peak position
Romania Airplay (TopHit)	91

2025 weekly chart performance for "Pepas"
Chart (2025)	Peak position
Romania Airplay (TopHit)	71

=== Monthly charts ===
2021–2025 monthly chart performance for "Pepas"
Chart (2021–2025)	Peak position
Paraguay Airplay (SGP)	1
Romania Airplay (TopHit)	86

2022 monthly chart performance for "Pepas"
Chart (2022)	Peak position
CIS Airplay (TopHit)	43
Czech Republic (Rádio Top 100)	41
Czech Republic (Singles Digitál Top 100)	20
Russia Airplay (TopHit)	51
Slovakia (Rádio Top 100)	12
Slovakia (Singles Digitál Top 100)	8

=== Year-end charts ===
2021 year-end chart performance for "Pepas"
Chart (2021)	Position
Austria (Ö3 Austria Top 40)	75
Belgium (Ultratop Flanders)	43
Belgium (Ultratop Wallonia)	29
France (SNEP)	32
Germany (Official German Charts)	71
Global 200 (Billboard)	70
Hungary (Dance Top 40)	55
Hungary (Single Top 40)	88
Hungary (Stream Top 40)	94
Italy (FIMI)	49
Netherlands (Dutch Top 40)	15
Netherlands (Single Top 100)	5
Portugal (AFP)	9
Spain (PROMUSICAE)	5
Suriname (Nationale Top 40)	9
Switzerland (Schweizer Hitparade)	27
US Hot Dance/Electronic Songs (Billboard)	5
US Hot Latin Songs (Billboard)	7

2022 year-end chart performance for "Pepas"
Chart (2022)	Position
Austria (Ö3 Austria Top 40)	8
Belgium (Ultratop 50 Flanders)	30
Belgium (Ultratop 50 Wallonia)	24
Canada (Canadian Hot 100)	22
Denmark (Tracklisten)	40
Germany (Official German Charts)	11
Global 200 (Billboard)	15
Hungary (Dance Top 40)	2
Hungary (Rádiós Top 40)	10
Hungary (Single Top 40)	16
Hungary (Stream Top 40)	18
Italy (FIMI)	53
Lithuania (AGATA)	65
Netherlands (Single Top 100)	24
Spain (PROMUSICAE)	36
Sweden (Sverigetopplistan)	32
Switzerland (Schweizer Hitparade)	3
US Hot Dance/Electronic Songs (Billboard)	3
US Hot Latin Songs (Billboard)	9

2023 year-end chart performance for "Pepas"
Chart (2023)	Position
Global Excl. US (Billboard)	134
Hungary (Dance Top 40)	3
Switzerland (Schweizer Hitparade)	36

2024 year-end chart performance for "Pepas"
Chart (2024)	Position
Hungary (Dance Top 40)	42
Hungary (Rádiós Top 40)	75
Romania Airplay (TopHit)	164

2025 year-end chart performance for "Pepas"
Chart (2025)	Position
Hungary (Rádiós Top 40)	44
Romania Airplay (TopHit)	135

== In popular culture ==
The song was used by the 2021-22 Miami Heat as the team's anthem throughout the season.

Major League Soccer club Charlotte FC has used the song as its pre-match hype song since its inaugural season in 2022. Another MLS club, the Vancouver Whitecaps, began using Pepas as their goal song during the 2022 season.

Real Madrid players celebrated their comeback victories (and eventual trophy win) in the dressing rooms by singing Pepas during the 2021–22 UEFA Champions League season.

The song was also featured in the 2023 film Missing.

Seattle Mariners relieving pitcher Andrés Muñoz has used the song, along with the David Guetta and Tiësto remixes, as his walk up music.

== Certifications ==
Certifications for "Pepas"
Region	Certification	Certified units/sales
Austria (IFPI Austria)	3× Platinum	90,000^{‡}
Belgium (BRMA)	Platinum	40,000^{‡}
Brazil (Pro-Música Brasil)	Diamond	160,000^{‡}
Canada (Music Canada)	2× Platinum	160,000^{‡}
Denmark (IFPI Danmark)	2× Platinum	180,000^{‡}
France (SNEP)	Diamond	333,333^{‡}
Germany (BVMI)	3× Gold	600,000^{‡}
Italy (FIMI)	4× Platinum	400,000^{‡}
Mexico (AMPROFON)	Diamond+3× Platinum+Gold	1,190,000^{‡}
New Zealand (RMNZ)	Platinum	30,000^{‡}
Poland (ZPAV)	4× Platinum	200,000^{‡}
Portugal (AFP)	6× Platinum	60,000^{‡}
Spain (Promusicae)	8× Platinum	480,000^{‡}
Switzerland (IFPI Switzerland)	8× Platinum	160,000^{‡}
United Kingdom (BPI)	Silver	200,000^{‡}
United States (RIAA)	52× Platinum (Latin)	3,120,000^{‡}
Streaming
Central America (CFC)	3× Platinum	21,000,000^{†}
Greece (IFPI Greece)	Platinum	2,000,000^{†}
Sweden (GLF)	Platinum	8,000,000^{†}
^{‡} Sales+streaming figures based on certification alone.^{†} Streaming-only figures based on certification alone.

== See also ==
- List of Billboard Hot Latin Songs and Latin Airplay number ones of 2021
- List of Billboard Hot Latin Songs and Latin Airplay number ones of 2022
- List of Billboard number-one dance songs of 2021
- List of Billboard Argentina Hot 100 top-ten singles in 2021
- List of best-selling Latin singles
