= Da' Take Over =

Studio album by Angel & Khriz
- Released: March 23, 2010
- Recorded: 2009 (THC Studios)
- Genre: Reggaeton
- Length: 45:08
- Label: VI Records

Angel & Khriz chronology
Showtime (2008)	Da' Take Over (2010)

Da' Take Over is Angel & Khriz's third studio album. The album was released under VI Records label. It was released on March 23, 2010. It was nominated for a Lo Nuestro Award for Urban Album of the Year.

== Track listing ==
1. No Hacen Na – 3:39 Angel Rivera, Christian Colon, Juan Santana
2. Ella Quiere (Que, He, He) – 2:48 Angel Rivera, Christian Colon, Jose Barbosa, Juan Santana
3. Ayer La Vi – 3:56 Angel Rivera, Christian Colon, Juan Santana
4. Sin Vergüenza – 3:52 Angel Rivera, Christian Colon, Hector Padilla, Juan Santana, Miguel De Jesus
5. Maltrátame – 3:08 Angel Rivera, Christian Colon, Juan Santana
6. No Vale La Pena – 3:50 Angel Rivera, Christian Colon, Juan Santana
7. Súbelo (Turn It Up) – 3:40 Angel Rivera, Christian Colon, Juan Santana, Tramar Dillard
8. Me Enamoré – 4:16 Angel Rivera, Christian Colon, Jose Torres, Juan Santana
9. Tu Gato Nuevo – 3:23 Angel Rivera, Christian Colon, Juan Santana
10. Mal Negocio (Ya No) - 4:07 Angel Rivera, Christian Colon, Juan Santana, Victor Manuelle
11. Dime – 3:14 Angel Rivera, Christian Colon, Juan Santana
12. ¿Qué Hay Que Hacer? – 3:34 Angel Rivera, Christian Colon, Jexel Reyes
13. Como Olvidarte – 4:20 Angel Rivera, Christian Colon, Daniel Velazquez, Juan Santana

== Charts ==
Chart (2010)	Peak position
US Top Latin Albums (Billboard)	6
US Latin Rhythm Albums (Billboard)	1

== See also ==
- List of number-one Billboard Latin Rhythm Albums of 2010
