= Los Reyes del Perreo =

Compilation album by Alexis & Fido
- Released: September 19, 2006
- Recorded: 2006
- Genre: Reggaeton
- Label: Fresh; Sony BMG Norte; Wild Dogz
- Producer: Monserrate & DJ Urba; Luny Tunes; DJ Memo; Nely el Arma Secreta; Mekka; DJ Nelson; DJ Sonic; Noriega; Naldo; Nesty la Mente Maestra

Alexis & Fido chronology
The Pitbulls (2005)	Los Reyes del Perreo (2006)	Sobrenatural (2007)

Singles from Los Reyes del Perreo
- 1. "Me Quiere Besar" Released: 2006

Los Reyes del Perreo, by Alexis & Fido, is a collection of nine of their biggest songs plus five new ones. It was released on September 19, 2006 by Fresh Production, Sony BMG Norte and Wild Dogz.

== Track listing ==
1. Decidir (produced by Monserrate & DJ Urba)
2. Me Quiere Besar (produced by Mekka "La Nueva Amenaza")
3. Dulce (ft. Arcángel & De La Ghetto) (produced by Monserrate & DJ Urba)
4. La Llamada (produced by Danny Fornaris)
5. Descontrol (ft. Los Yetzons) (produced by Monserrate & DJ Urba)
6. Tocale Bocina (produced by DJ Nelson, DJ Sonic, Noriega)
7. El Tiburón (ft. Baby Ranks) (produced by Luny Tunes, Nely)
8. Gata Michu Michu (produced by DJ Memo)
9. Piden Perreo (ft. Wisin & Yandel) (produced by Luny Tunes)
10. Te Pase El Rolo (produced by Luny Tunes)
11. El Palo (produced by N.O.T.T.Y. & DJ Sonic)
12. La Calle Me Llama (ft. Yandel) (produced by Luny Tunes)
13. Ella Le Gusta (produced by Luny Tunes & Noriega)
14. Jinete (ft. Wisin) (produced by Monserrate & DJ Urba)

== Chart performance ==
Chart (2006)	Peak position
U.S. Billboard Top Latin Albums	26
U.S. Billboard Top Heatseekers	35
U.S. Billboard Latin Rhythm Albums	12
