= Ángel & Khriz =

Puerto Rican reggaeton duo

Angel & Khriz
- Also known as: Los MVP; Los Internacionales
- Origin: Puerto Rico
- Genre: Reggaeton
- Years active: 1999–present
- Labels: MVP; Machete; VI; Universal Latino; Mr. 305

Angel & Khriz are a Puerto Rican reggaeton duo, consisting of Angel Rivera Guzmán (Angel) and Christian Colón Rolon (Khriz). Their high-impact performance on this first-time-out recording led to their sponsorship by Héctor el Father. Through that relationship, the duo recorded their first single, "Cazando Voy," which reached platinum status and earned them the reputation as "the MVPs of the year." In 2004, they signed with MVP Records and toured extensively throughout South and Central America.

The success of their debut recording, Los MVPs, garnered attention and an eventual distribution with Universal's Machete Music, a label targeting the ever-growing urban Latino audience. Appearances in many U.S. cities to receptive crowds have earned the duo a reputation as one of reggaeton's most popular duos. In 2005, their debut studio album Los MVP was released and featured the hit singles "Ven Baílalo" and "De Cazeria". The album was certified Platinum by the United States Recording Industry Association of America (RIAA) and a special edition was released the following year. The special edition of Los MVP featured their two singles "Fua" and "De Lao a Lao".

Performances at high-visibility events like opening Premios Juventud and closing the 2006 Latin Billboard Awards alongside Tito El Bambino and Wisin & Yandel continued to increase these budding artists' recognition and potential. Almost three years later, in 2008, their second studio album, Showtime, was released. Singles featured on the album were "La Vecina" and "Na De Na". This album was released by Machete Music. Two years later, Da' Take Over, the duo's third studio album was released. It featured the hit singles "Ayer La Vi" & "Me Enamoré".

== Career ==
Ángel and Khriz began their reggaeton career alongside Nesty and Barbosa in 2001. In 2002, they were signed by Manolo Guatauba, a reggaeton pioneer, which led to their first singles. Regardless, it was not until they signed with writer/artist/producer Gocho and his label MVP Records in late 2002 that the duo gained prominence in the genre. After appearing in several underground compilations including the hit albums "Desafío" and "MVP 1", the duo released their first album "Los MVP" in 2004 on the label MVP Records under the distribution of Machete Music/Universal Music Latino. The album is famous for including the smash-hit "Ven báilalo", which performed well all over the world and is often regarded as one of the most renowned reggaeton songs in history, peaking at #3 on the Billboard charts. It was well received by underground and mainstream audiences alike going on to sell over 500,000 copies in the United States and Puerto Rico, receiving a gold and Latin platinum certifications by the RIAA.

In the year 2005, they came up with the songs "Fua", "De Lao A Lao" (the bachata, merengue and reggaeton versions), and "Las Noches Son Tristes". They have been compared to artists like Daddy Yankee, Don Omar, and Wisin & Yandel in terms of fame. They have also released a single entitled "Carita de ángel" (Face of an angel) from Echo "The Lab"'s compilation album Invasion. In 2008 they released their new album Showtime with the first single being "La Vecina" (The Neighbor) and their second single "Na de Na". Rockstar Games chose their song "Ven Báilalo" to appear in one of GTA IV's character trailers (Manny Escuela). The song features on the Grand Theft Auto IV radio station San Juan Sounds and later in the "GTA: Episodes From Liberty City" with the song "Na de Na". Their other song "Muévela" was featured in the Fast & Furious movie and soundtrack. Their 3rd album named "Da' Take Over" is now available on iTunes. They are currently touring the U.S and Latin America as part of their ''Da'Takeover tour''. The music is varied with a focus on reggae. They are currently working on their 4th album "Los Internacionales". The duo will be releasing their next single "No Hay Break Pa'Ninguna." on November 17, 2012. Eric Duars, the duo's manager confirmed this via Twitter. He mentioned in the tweet that the song is a reggaeton song and will silence critics that are saying the duo only releases commercial stuff such as dance and pop music.

== Discography ==
- Los MVP (2004)
- Showtime (2008)
- Da' Take Over (2010)
- New Season (2020)
