= Guaracha (Colombia) =

Genre of Colombian electronic dance music

Guaracha, also known as zapateo or aleteo, is an electronic music genre from Medellín, Colombia. The genre has no connection to the traditional guaracha of Cuba. The genre began in the 2010s when Colombian DJs, among them Medellín's Víctor Cárdenas and DJ Pereira, began looking within their own culture for inspiration. This eventually led to taking the festive trumpets, tambora drums and accordions of traditional cumbia arrangements (all from the Caribbean region of Colombia) and mixing them into electronic dance music.
