= Alexis & Fido =

Puerto Rican reggaeton duo

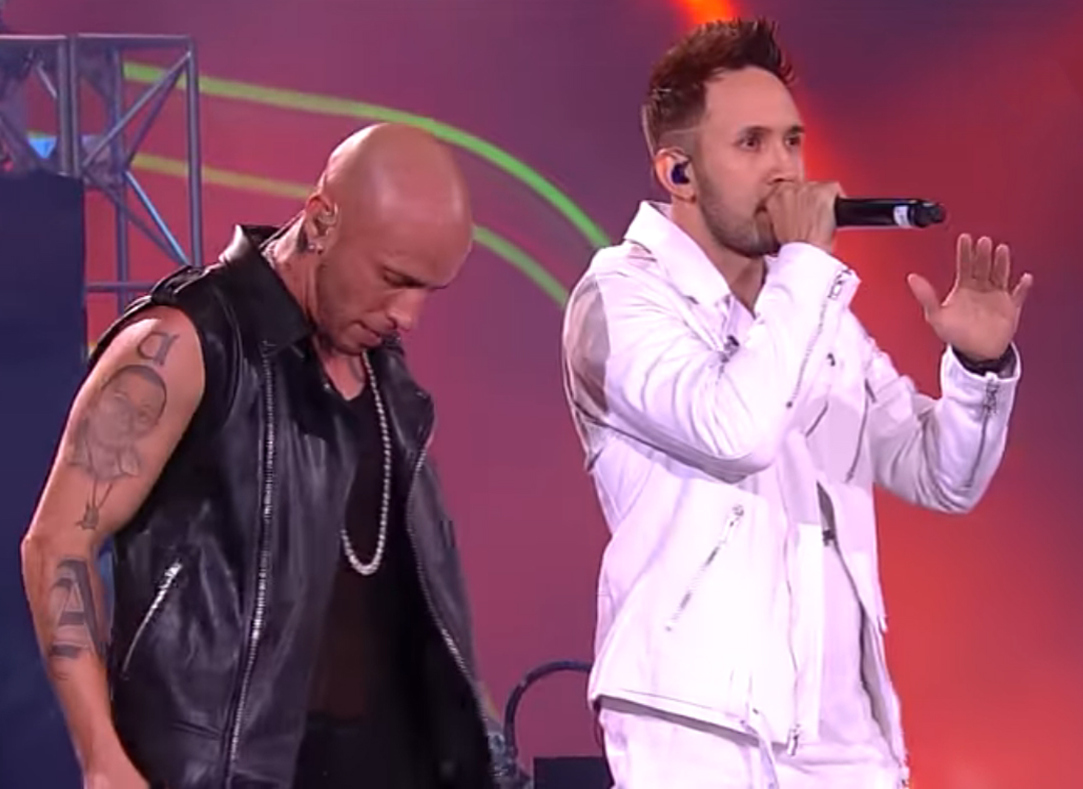
- Alexis & Fido in 2014

Background information
- Also known as: Los Reyes del Perreo; Los Pitbulls; El Dúo Sobrenatural; Los Profesores del Perreo
- Origin: Cayey, Puerto Rico
- Genres: Reggaeton
- Years active: 2000–present
- Labels: Wild Dogz; Sony BMG Norte; Warner Latina; Universal Latino
- Members: Raúl Alexis Ortiz Rolón; Joel Fido Martínez

Alexis & Fido, a.k.a. Los Pitbulls, Los Reyes del Perreo, are a reggaeton duo from Puerto Rico. They are CEOs and co-founders of Wild Dogz Music. In 2008, Sobrenatural was nominated for Album Urbano. In 2012, "Energía" was nominated for Canción Urbana. In 2013, "Rompe la Cintura" was nominated for – Interpretación Urbana. Nominated for the 2014 awards, "Álbum Urbano" with La Esencia.

== Musical career ==
According to Fido, he and Yandel were close friends as teenagers and helped each other kick-start their careers. Likewise, Alexis was close to Wisin, and also helped him with his career. Eventually the two duos were formed, Alexis & Fido and Wisin & Yandel, and went their separate ways. Alexis & Fido featured on Wisin & Yandel's De Otra Manera album, both as a group and as solo appearances. They made more appearances such as Yandel's solo album Quien Contra Mí, in Wisin's solo album El Sobreviviente. These plans include working with artists like Arcángel, Wisin & Yandel again, and many more artists.

Their debut album, 2005's The Pitbulls, debuted at the No. 2 spot on Billboard's Top Heatseekers and the Latin Rhythm charts and at the No. 1 spot on the Top Latin Albums chart, eventually reaching gold status with over 200,000 copies sold worldwide. Their debut single, 2005's "Eso Ehh!", entered the Top 10 of Billboard's Hot Latin Singles chart and was featured on an episode of HBO's The Wire, and on the television series Entourage.

In 2006, Alexis y Fido released the singles collection Los Reyes del Perreo. Before the release of their second album Sobrenatural (2007), Alexis y Fido appeared in the reggaetón-centered drama, Feel the Noise, produced by Jennifer Lopez and starring R&B singer Omarion, Melonie Diaz and Rosa Arredondo. The album spawned two singles, "5 Letras" and "Soy Igual Que Tú", both of which topped the Latin Rhythm chart. The latter remained atop Billboard's Latin Rhythm chart for over a month. Sobrenatural sold over 100,000 units worldwide.

The duo was invited to perform alongside Camila at the 2008 Billboard Latin Music Awards and they joined Toby Love on stage at the 2008 Premios Juventud awards show. They were nominated for two Latin Grammy Awards for "Soy Igual Que Tú" and in the Best Urban Music Album field for Sobrenatural.

In 2009 they released Down to Earth. In November 2010, they released the album Perreología. Its first single "Rescate" features Daddy Yankee while the second single "Zombie" features Yaviah.

Recently, they've done collaborations with artists such as Bad Bunny with the song "Tocate Tú Misma" and Noriel with the song "Desobediente".

== Personal information ==
Alexis' real name is Raúl Alexis Ortiz Rolón (born August 5, 1979), while Fido's real name is Joel Fido Martínez (born August 13, 1978). They own the label Wild Dogz, which they created in 2006. According to Alexis & Fido, in an interview, the song "El Palo" put them on the map and made them known. In 2008, the duo participated in a campaign to promote voting in the 2008 general elections in Puerto Rico. This initiative included a concert titled "Vota o quédate callao" (in English, vote or be quiet).

== Discography ==
- 2005: The Pitbulls
- 2006: Los Reyes del Perreo
- 2007: Sobrenatural
- 2009: Down to Earth
- 2011: Perreología
- 2012: Piden Perreo... Lo Más Duro
- 2014: La Esencia
- 2020: La Escuela
- 2021: Barrio Canino, Pt. 1
- 2022: Barrio canino: parte 2
