= The Pitbulls (album) =

Studio album by Alexis & Fido
- Released: November 15, 2005
- Recorded: 2004–2005
- Genre: Reggaeton
- Label: Sony BMG Norte
- Producer: Nesty la Mente Maestra & Víctor el Nasi (Co-exec.), Noriega, Luny Tunes

Alexis & Fido chronology
The Pitbulls (2005)	Los Reyes del Perreo (2006)

Singles from The Pitbulls
- 1. "Eso Ehh...!!" Released: 2005; 2. "El Tiburón" Released: 2005; 3. "Agárrale el Pantalón" Released: 2006

Professional ratings
Review scores
Source	Rating
AllMusic	4/5 stars
Houston Chronicle	3/5 stars

The Pitbulls is the debut album by reggaeton duo Alexis & Fido. It was released on November 15, 2005. Featured guests on the album are Mr. Phillips, Héctor el Father, Baby Rasta, Zion & Lennox, Trébol Clan, Tony Sunshine and Baby Ranks. Nesty la Mente Maestra and Víctor el Nasi produced the bulk of the album.

== Track listing ==
1. Bomba de Tiempo (Intro) (feat. Mr. Phillips)
2. Eso Ehh...!!
3. El Lobo (feat. Héctor el Father & Baby Rasta)
4. Gelatina
5. Sólo un Minuto
6. Agárrale el Pantalón (feat. Zion & Lennox)
7. Kumbiatón
8. Perro Caliente
9. Tú No Sabes
10. Salgan a Cazarnos (feat. Trébol Clan)
11. Tributo Borincano (feat. Tony Sunshine & Mr. Phillips)
12. No Lo Dejes Que Se Apague
13. ¿Quién Soy?
14. El Tiburón (feat. Baby Ranks)

== Chart performance ==
It debuted on 3 Billboard charts: Top Heatseekers (#2), Latin Rhythm Albums (# 2) and Top Latin Albums (# 4). The album was certified Disco de Platino by the RIAA for shipping 100,000 units in the US.

=== Charts ===
Chart (2005)	Peak position
U.S. Billboard 200	164
U.S. Billboard Top Latin Albums	4
U.S. Billboard Top Heatseekers	2
U.S. Billboard Latin Rhythm Albums	2

== Sales and certifications ==
Region	Certification	Certified units/sales
United States (RIAA)	Platinum (Latin)	100,000^{^}
^{^} Shipments figures based on certification alone.
