= List of awards and nominations received by Yandel =

Yandel awards and nominations
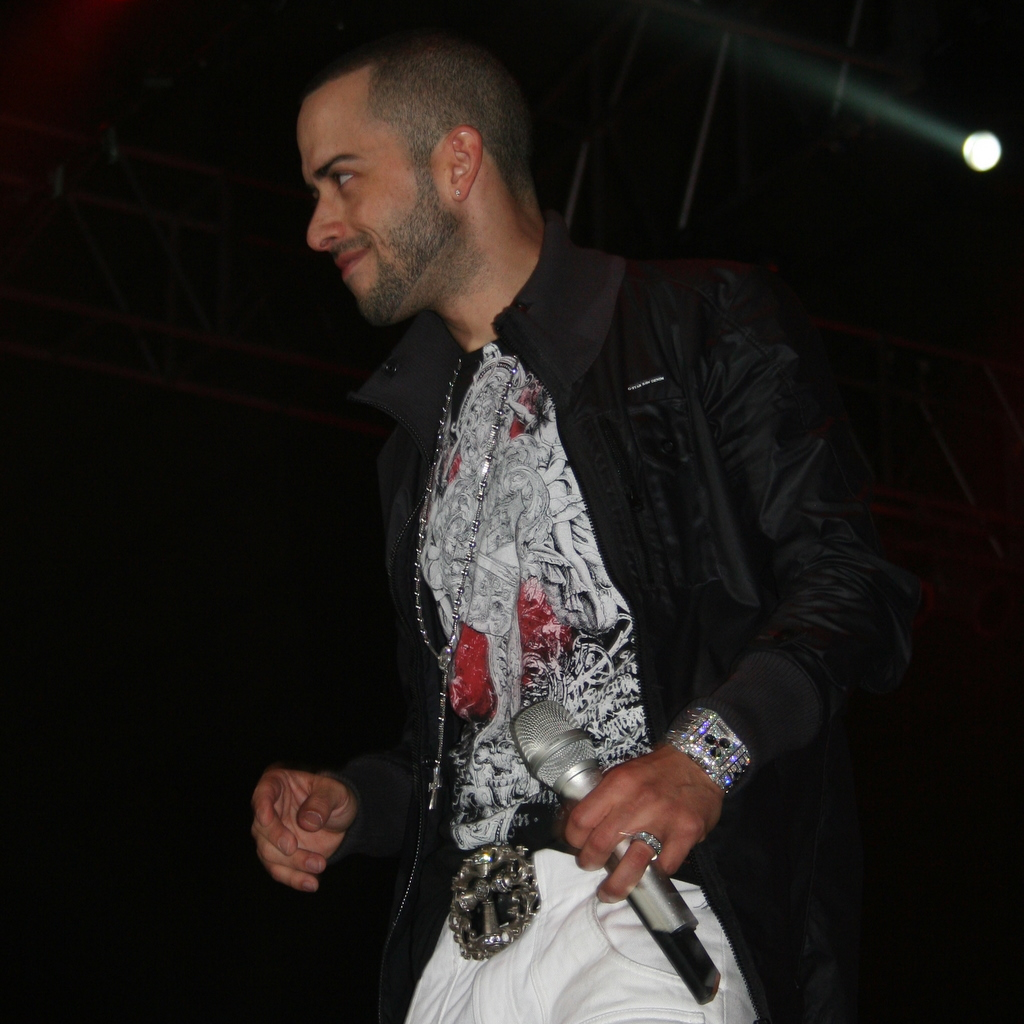
- Yandel performing at the Gran Arena del Cibao in Dominican Republic on March 14, 2009.
Awards and nominations
Award	Wins	Nominations
Billboard Latin Music Awards	0	7
Latin American Music Awards	1	7
Latin Grammy Awards	2	5
Premios Juventud	0	2
Lo Nuestro Awards	1	11

Totals (Note: Certain award groups do not simply award one winner. They acknowledge several different recipients, have runners-up, and have third place. Since this is a specific recognition and is different from losing an award, runner-up mentions are considered wins in this award tally. For simplification and to avoid errors, each award in this list has been presumed to have had a prior nomination.)
- Wins: 7
- Nominations: 51

Llandel Veguilla Malavé (born January 14, 1977), better known by his stage name Yandel, is a Puerto Rican reggaeton recording artist and record producer, who emerged in the music scene during late-1990s. He is best known as a member of the reggaeton duo Wisin & Yandel, active from 1998 to 2013, year in which they began a hiatus period in order to focus on their respective solo careers. Among several accolades, Wisin & Yandel are the only reggaeton acts to win both a Grammy and a Latin Grammy Award, both awards achieved for their 2007 studio album Los Extraterrestres.

After announcing his hiatus with Wisin, Yandel released two studio albums, an extended play and a live album. His studio albums, De Lider a Leyenda (2013) and Dangerous (2015), debuted at number-one on Billboard's Top Latin Albums and both received Latin certifications by the Recording Industry Association of America (Gold and Platinum, respectively). Currently he is working on his upcoming album, Update, scheduled to be released during 2017.

As to accolades received as soloist, Yandel won 7 awards out of 51 nominations, including two Latin Grammy Awards (Best Urban Song and Best Urban Fusion/Performance), a Latin American Music Award for Album of the Year and a special award given by the Latin Songwriters Hall of Fame's board of directors.

== Awards and nominations ==
Award/organization	Year	Nominee/work	Category	Result	Ref.
American Society of Composers, Authors and Publishers Awards	2015	"Moviendo Caderas"	Latin Award-Winning Urban Songs	Recipient	
American Society of Composers, Authors and Publishers Awards	2017	"Encantadora"	Latin Award-Winning Urban Songs	Recipient	
American Society of Composers, Authors and Publishers Awards	2017	"Ay Mi Dios"	Latin Award-Winning Urban Songs	Recipient	
American Society of Composers, Authors and Publishers Awards	2017	"El Perdedor"	Latin Award-Winning Urban Songs	Recipient	
American Society of Composers, Authors and Publishers Awards	2017	"Imaginar"	Latin Award-Winning Tropical Songs	Recipient	
Billboard Latin Music Awards	2014	Yandel	Latin Rhythm Songs Artist of the Year – Solo	Nominated	
Billboard Latin Music Awards	2014	Yandel	Latin Rhythm Albums Artist of the Year – Solo	Nominated	
Billboard Latin Music Awards	2014	De Líder a Leyenda	Latin Rhythm Album of the Year	Nominated	
Billboard Latin Music Awards	2015	Yandel	Latin Rhythm Songs Artist of the Year – Solo	Nominated	
Billboard Latin Music Awards	2015	Yandel	Latin Rhythm Albums Artist of the Year – Solo	Nominated	
Billboard Latin Music Awards	2016	Yandel	Latin Rhythm Albums Artist of the Year – Solo	Nominated	
Billboard Latin Music Awards	2016	Legacy: De Líder a Leyenda Tour	Latin Rhythm Album of the Year	Nominated	
Billboard Latin Music Awards	2017	Yandel	Latin Rhythm Songs Artist of the Year – Solo	Nominated	
Billboard Latin Music Awards	2017	Dangerous	Latin Rhythm Album of the Year	Nominated	
Billboard Latin Music Awards	2017	"Imaginar"	Tropical Song of the Year	Nominated	
Billboard Latin Music Awards	2017	"El Perdedor"	Latin Rhythm Song of the Year	Nominated	
Billboard Latin Music Awards	2018	Update	Latin Rhythm Album of the Year	Nominated	
Billboard Latin Music Awards	2023	"Yandel 150"	Airplay Song of the Year	Nominated	
Billboard Latin Music Awards	2023	"Yandel 150"	Latin Rhythm Song of the Year	Nominated	
Broadcast Music, Inc. Awards	2007	Yandel	Latin Songwriters of the Year	Recipient	
Broadcast Music, Inc. Awards	2012	Yandel	Latin Songwriters of the Year	Recipient	
Broadcast Music, Inc. Awards	2015	"Hablé de Ti"	Latin Award-Winning Songs	Recipient	
Broadcast Music, Inc. Awards	2015	"Hasta Abajo"	Latin Award-Winning Songs	Recipient	
Broadcast Music, Inc. Awards	2016	"Moviendo Caderas"	Latin Award-Winning Songs	Recipient	
iHeartRadio Music Awards	2017	Yandel	Latin Artist of the Year	Nominated	
iHeartRadio Music Awards	2017	"Ay Mi Dios" (with IAmChino, Pitbull & Chacal)	Latin Song of the Year	Nominated	
iHeartRadio Music Awards	2025	"Brickell" (with Feid)	Latin Pop/Urban Song of the Year	Nominated	
International Dance Music Awards	2014	"Hablé de Ti"	Best Latin Dance Track	Nominated	
Latin American Music Awards	2015	Yandel	Favorite Urban Male Artist	Nominated	
Latin American Music Awards	2016	Yandel	Favorite Urban Artist	Nominated	
Latin American Music Awards	2016	Dangerous	Album of the Year	Won	
Latin American Music Awards	2016	Dangerous	Urban Album of the Year	Nominated	
Latin American Music Awards	2016	"Encantadora"	Song of the Year	Nominated	
Latin American Music Awards	2016	"Encantadora"	Favorite Urban Song	Nominated	
Latin American Music Awards	2016	"El Perdedor"	Favorite Collaboration	Nominated	
Latin Grammy Awards	2014	De Líder a Leyenda	Best Urban Music Album	Nominated	
Latin Grammy Awards	2015	Legacy: De Líder a Leyenda Tour	Best Urban Music Album	Nominated	
Latin Grammy Awards	2015	"Calentura"	Best Urban Performance	Nominated	
Latin Grammy Awards	2016	"Encantadora"	Best Urban Song	Won	
Latin Grammy Awards	2016	"Encantadora"	Best Urban Fusion/Performance	Won	
Latin Grammy Awards	2023	"Yandel 150"	Best Urban Song	Nominated	
Latin Grammy Awards	2023	"Yandel 150"	Best Urban Fusion/Performance	Nominated	
Latin Grammy Awards	2025	Elyte	Best Urban Music Album	Nominated	
Latin Grammy Awards	2025	"Reggaeton Malandro" (with Tego Calderon)	Best Reggaeton Performance	Nominated	
Latin Music Italian Awards	2014	"Moviendo Caderas"	Best Latin Male Video of The Year	Nominated	
Latin Music Italian Awards	2014	"Hasta Abajo"	Best Latin Urban Song of The Year	Nominated	
Latin Music Italian Awards	2015	Yandel	Best Latin Alternative Artist of The Year	Nominated	
Latin Music Italian Awards	2015	"Noche y De Día"	Best Latin Song of The Year	Nominated	
Latin Music Italian Awards	2015	"Noche y De Día"	Best Latin Male Video of The Year	Nominated	
Latin Music Italian Awards	2015	"Noche y De Día"	Best Latin Dance of The Year	Won	
Latin Music Italian Awards	2015	"Calentura"	Best Latin Urban Song of The Year	Nominated	
Latin Music Italian Awards	2015	"Como Yo Te Quiero"	Favorite Lyrics	Nominated	
Latin Music Italian Awards	2016	"Encantadora"	Best Latin Male Video of The Year	Nominated	
Latin Music Italian Awards	2016	"Ay Mi Dios" (with IAmChino, Pitbull & Chacal)	Best Latin Urban Song of The Year	Nominated	
Latin Music Italian Awards	2016	"Imaginar"	Best Latin Urban Song of The Year	Nominated	
Latin Music Italian Awards	2016	"El Perdedor"	Best Latin Remix Of The Year	Nominated	
Latin Songwriters Hall of Fame	2016	Yandel	The Muse Voice Hero's Award	Won	
Lo Nuestro Awards	2014	"Hablé de Ti"	Video of the Year	Nominated	
Lo Nuestro Awards	2015	Yandel	Urban Artist of the Year	Nominated	
Lo Nuestro Awards	2015	De Líder a Leyenda	Urban Album of the Year	Nominated	
Lo Nuestro Awards	2015	"Hasta Abajo"	Urban Song of the Year	Nominated	
Lo Nuestro Awards	2015	"Mi Peor Error" (with Alejandra Guzmán)	Pop Collaboration of the Year	Nominated	
Lo Nuestro Awards	2016	Yandel	Urban Artist of the Year	Nominated	
Lo Nuestro Awards	2017	Yandel	Urban Artist of the Year	Nominated	
Lo Nuestro Awards	2017	Dangerous	Urban Album of the Year	Nominated	
Lo Nuestro Awards	2017	"Encantadora"	Urban Song of the Year	Nominated	
Lo Nuestro Awards	2017	"Ay Mi Dios" (with IAmChino, Pitbull & Chacal)	Urban Collaboration of the Year	Won	
Lo Nuestro Awards	2017	"Mayor Que Yo 3" (with Luny Tunes, Daddy Yankee, Wisin, Don Omar)	Urban Collaboration of the Year	Nominated	
Lo Nuestro Awards	2019	"Mira" (with Jerry Rivera)	Tropical Song of the Year	Nominated	
Lo Nuestro Awards	2019	"Mira" (with Jerry Rivera)	Tropical Collaboration of the Year	Nominated	
Lo Nuestro Awards	2024	Yandel	Male Urban Artist of the Year	Nominated	
Lo Nuestro Awards	2024	Resistencia	Urban Album of the Year	Nominated	
Lo Nuestro Awards	2024	"Nunca y Pico" (with Maluma & Eladio Carrión)	Song of the Year	Nominated	
Lo Nuestro Awards	2024	"Nunca y Pico" (with Maluma & Eladio Carrión)	Urban Collaboration of the Year	Nominated	
Lo Nuestro Awards	2024	"Yandel 150" (with Feid)	Urban Song of the Year	Nominated	
Lo Nuestro Awards	2025	Yandel	Male Urban Artist of the Year	Nominated	
Lo Nuestro Awards	2025	"Sandunga" (with Don Omar & Wisin)	Urban Song of the Year	Nominated	
Lo Nuestro Awards	2025	"Sandunga" (with Don Omar & Wisin)	Urban Collaboration of the Year	Nominated	
Lo Nuestro Awards	2025	"Borracho y Loco" (with Myke Towers)	Urban Collaboration of the Year	Nominated	
Lo Nuestro Awards	2026	Yandel	Male Urban Artist of the Year	Nominated	
Lo Nuestro Awards	2026	Elyte	Urban Album of the Year	Nominated	
Lo Nuestro Awards	2026	“Hablame Claro” (with Feid)	Urban Song of the Year	Nominated	
Lo Nuestro Awards	2026	“Wells Fargo” (with Arcángel, Ñengo Flow & De La Ghetto)	Urban Collaboration of the Year	Nominated	
LOS40 Music Awards	2026	Yandel	Best Latin Act	Pending	
LOS40 Music Awards	2026	Sinfónico	Best Latin Tour or Concert	Pending	
Premios Juventud	2014	Yandel	Favorite Urban Artist	Nominated	
Premios Juventud	2015	De Líder a Leyenda VIP Tour	Favorite Concert	Nominated	
Premios Juventud	2023	"Yandel 150" (with Feid)	Best Urban Track	Nominated	
Premios Juventud	2023	"Nunca y Pico" (with Maluma & Eladio Carrión)	Best Urban Mix	Nominated	
Premios Juventud	2024	"Borracho y Loco" (with Myke Towers)	Best Urban Mix	Nominated	
Premios Juventud	2025	Elyte	Best Urban Album	Nominated	
Premios Juventud	2025	"Mamasota" (with Manuel Turizo)	Best Urban Mix	Nominated	
Premios Juventud	2026	Yandel	Change Agent	Won	
Premios Juventud	2026	Sinfónico (En Vivo)	Album of the Year	Nominated	
Premios Juventud	2026	"Me Voy A La Chingada" (with Xavi)	Best Urban Mix	Nominated	
Premios Nuestra Tierra	2024	"Trofeo" (with Maluma)	Best Urban Song	Nominated	
Premios Nuestra Tierra	2024	"Trofeo" (with Maluma)	Best Music Video	Nominated	
Premios Nuestra Tierra	2024	"Yandel 150" (with Feid)	Best Urban Collaboration	Nominated	
Premios Tu Mundo	2014	Yandel	Favorite Urban Artist	Nominated	
Premios Tu Música Urbano	2019	Yandel	Urban Male Artist of the Year	Nominated	
Premios Tu Música Urbano	2020	"En Cero" (with Sebastián Yatra & Manuel Turizo)	Top Song - Urban Pop	Nominated	
Premios Tu Música Urbano	2023	Yandel	Top Artist - Male	Nominated	
Premios Tu Música Urbano	2023	"Yandel 150" (with Feid)	Collaboration of the Year	Won	
Premios Tu Música Urbano	2023	Resistencia	Album of the Year - Male	Nominated	
Premios Tu Música Urbano	2025	Yandel	Artist of the Year	Nominated	
Premios Tu Música Urbano	2025	"Worthy" (with Blanca)	Top Song - Christian/Spiritual	Nominated	
Premios Tu Música Urbano	2026	"Como Es Que Se hace" (with Latin Mafia)	Song of the Year - Duo or Group	Nominated	
Tecla Awards	2016	Yandel	Best Musician/Band/Group on Social Media	Won	

== See also ==
- List of awards and nominations received by Wisin & Yandel
