= Update (Yandel album) =

Studio album by Yandel
- Released: September 8, 2017
- Recorded: November 2016 – June 2017
- Studio: Criteria Studios (Miami, Florida, US)
- Genre: Reggaeton; Latin trap; R&B
- Length: 50:55
- Language: Spanish
- Label: Sony Latin
- Producer: Tainy; Haze; Jumbo; Sky; Bullnene; The Rude Boys; DJ Luian; Mambo Kingz

Yandel chronology
Dangerous (2015)	Update (2017)	The One (2019)

Singles from Update
- 1. "Mi Religión" Released: May 5, 2017; 2. "Explícale" Released: August 11, 2017; 3. "Como Antes" Released: September 8, 2017

Update (stylized #Update) is the fourth studio album (sixth overall) by Puerto Rican singer and songwriter Yandel, released on September 8, 2017, under Sony Music Latin. It was released two years after his previous studio album, Dangerous.

Lyrically, Update explores themes ranging from romance, sex, and dance. Yandel enlisted longtime collaborators Tainy and Haze, as well as other producers including Sky, Bullnene, The Rude Boyz, Jumbo, DJ Luian, and Mambo Kingz. Musically, the record is a mixture of reggaeton, Latin trap, and R&B music, with influences of American and European sounds. The album features nine vocal collaborations: Wisin, Zion & Lennox, Maluma, J Balvin, Plan B, Ozuna, Luis Fonsi, Becky G, and Bad Bunny.

== Background ==
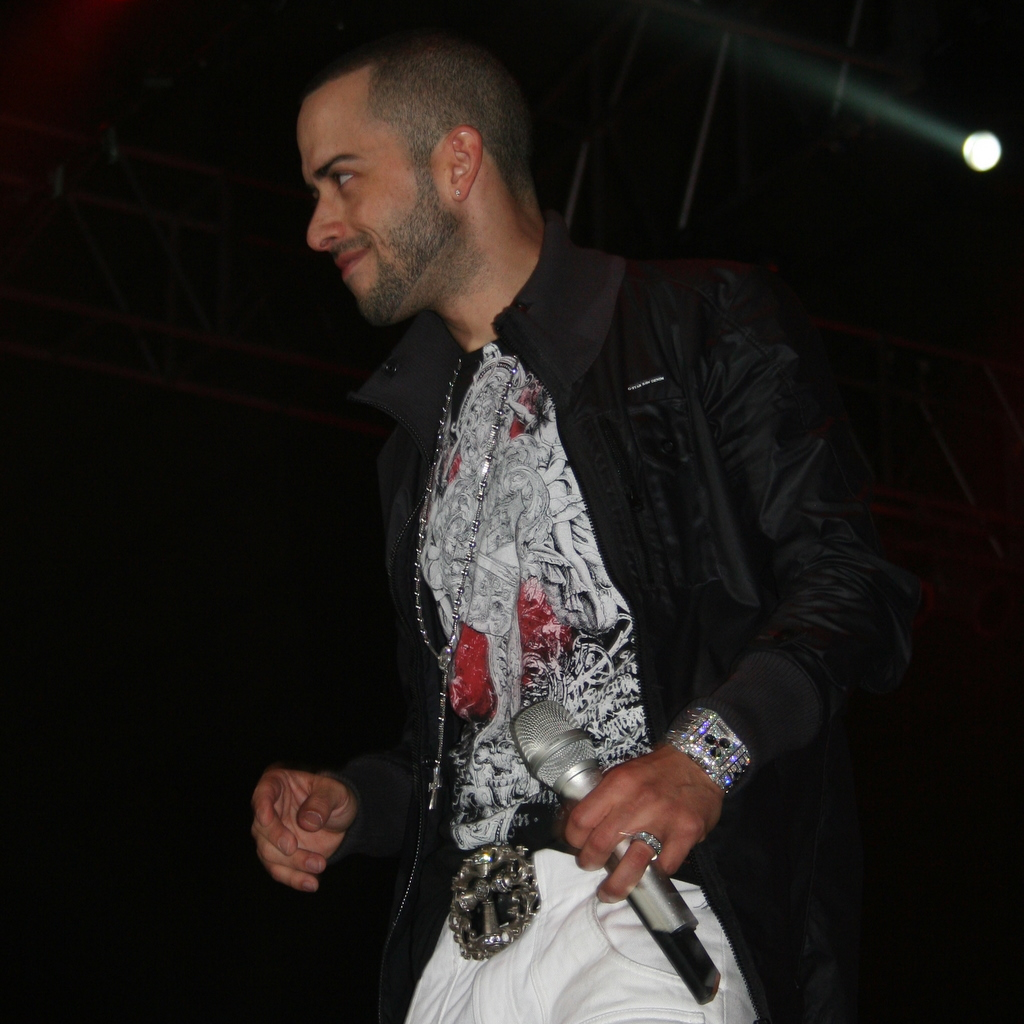
Yandel in 2009.

Yandel's previous studio albums, De Líder a Leyenda and Dangerous, were commercially successful in the US Latin market, both topping the US Top Latin Albums chart and eventually selling more than 90,000 album-equivalent units combined. The lead single of Dangerous, "Encantadora", received Latin Grammy Awards for Best Urban Song and Best Urban Fusion/Performance at the 17th Annual Latin Grammy Awards. In March 2016, he became the first Puerto Rican act to sign with American rapper Jay-Z's record label Roc Nation. He was also honored by the Latin Songwriters Hall of Fame on October 13, 2016, for having reached "outstanding achievements" and having "contributed to the development of the Latin music".

In May 2017, Yandel confirmed guest features for Update including Puerto Rican singer Farruko and French disc jockey David Guetta, yet they were not part of the final track listing. His main focus on the album was reggaeton music, claiming that "the streets need the real reggaeton". He also stated that the album "is full of rhythms that have been part of [his] DNA as a music creator". He focused more on collaborations instead of solo tracks, unlike De Líder a Leyenda and Dangerous. Wisin and Yandel, in hiatus as duo since 2013, recorded four songs together for their upcoming respective solo studio albums between September 2016 and May 2017.

The album's title came up after Yandel noticed that various applications on his mobile phone needed an update. He started thinking about his trajectory and decided to give himself a "musical update", subsequently selecting Update as the title of the record. Musically, Yandel experimented with Latin trap music, a subgenre of hip hop music that became popular in Latin America during the mid-2010s, for the album. Both Tainy and Jumbo stated that their objective on the album was to make "something refreshing" and to "look for different things and sounds", while maintaining Yandel's essence. Haze opined that Update represents "the future of music".

== Composition ==
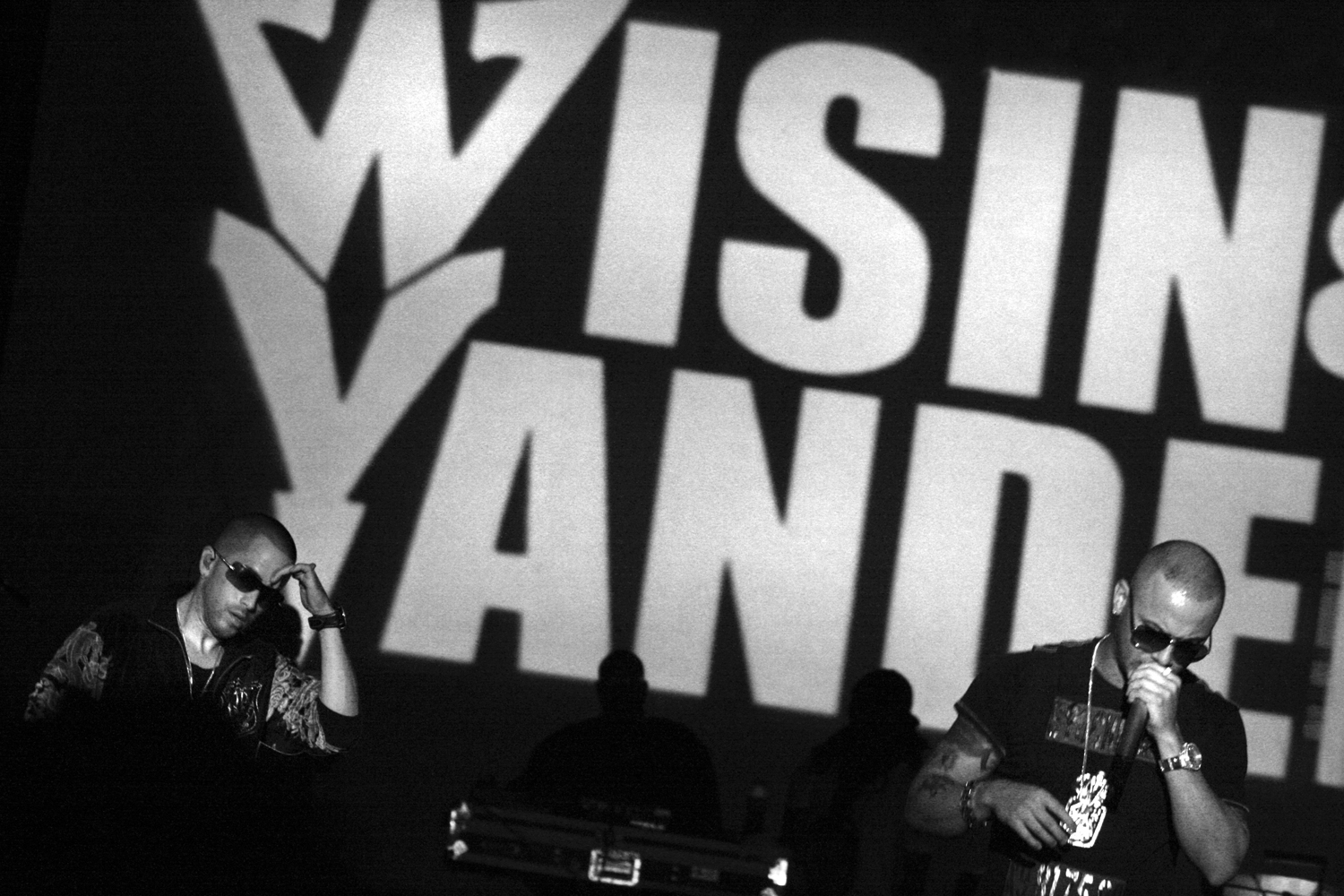
The track "Como Antes" was the first song by Wisin & Yandel (pictured) in five years.

The album's lyrics explore themes ranging from romance, sex, and dance, which are recurring themes in the singer's repertoire. The first track "Como Antes" ("Like Before") features Puerto Rican rapper and Yandel's longtime duo companion Wisin, being their first release as duo after five years. Yandel expressed that it is "a very danceable reggaeton song with an energy just like old times". The concept of the song was "to remember the music that Wisin & Yandel used to make before" but adding "a touch of 2017 by giving an update to that type of music". The lyrics mention various songs by Wisin & Yandel, including "En La Disco Bailoteo", "Dembow", "Saoco", "Mírala Bien", "Pam Pam", "Pegao", "La Pared", and "Ahora Es". "No Pare" ("Don't Stop") is a reggaeton song about a romantic encounter. "Llégale" is a "reggaeton from the roots" that features Puerto Rican duo Zion & Lennox and whose lyrics describe a secret relationship. The fourth track "Mi Religión" ("My Religion") is a romantic reggaeton song about a woman becoming a metaphoric religion for a man who is obsessed with her. Yandel stated that it is "a musical tribute to women and a celebration of the vital impact they have on our lives".

"Solo Mía" ("Only Mine") is a romantic and danceable reggaeton track that features Colombian singer Maluma. Yandel stated that he wanted "a Colombian sazón" and that the song "is dedicated to all Latin girls". "Bésame" ("Kiss Me") is an "americanized reggaeton" in which Yandel highlights the "cleanliness" of the snares and the bass. The lyrics are about a casual romantic encounter between two people that met in a nightclub. "Si Se Da" ("If It Happens") is an "energetic" reggaeton track that features Puerto Rican duo Plan B and in which Yandel wanted to "bring the nightclub". The lyrics describe a woman at a nightclub and the actions of a man who desires her. "No Quiero Amores" ("I Don't Want Loves") features Puerto Rican singer Ozuna and is a song about a disillusioned man who does not want to be back with the woman who betrayed him. Yandel invited Ozuna to work on the track because of their "sticky voices" that "don't fail in the choruses".

"Aprovéchame" ("Take Advantage of Me") musically combines reggaeton music with American and European sounds and its lyrics are about casual sex. Yandel stated that it "is the song that gives an update to the album". "Dónde Estás" ("Where Are You") features Puerto Rican singer Luis Fonsi and is a mixture of ballad and R&B, a type of music in which Yandel wanted to venture because of Fonsi's voice and style. The song is about a man who feels empty for not having the woman he loves, despite being rich and having a lot of friends. Nayeli Rivera of Monitor Latino described the track as "a fusion of urban sounds with light touches of pop and electronica". "Todo Lo Que Quiero" ("All I Want") is another "americanized reggaeton" that features Mexican-American singer and songwriter Becky G, who was invited following Yandel's lack of collaborations with female acts throughout his career. The lyrics describe a man who wants to confess his love to a woman. "Cuando Se Da" ("When It Is Given") is a danceable reggaeton song that tells the story of a young man who is experimenting with love and that has to decide between the two simultaneous relationships he is having. The final track, "Explícale" ("Explain To Him") is a Latin trap song that features Puerto Rican rapper Bad Bunny. Yandel wanted to "bring something different" and decided to record a trap song because of its contemporary popularity in Latin America.

== Production ==
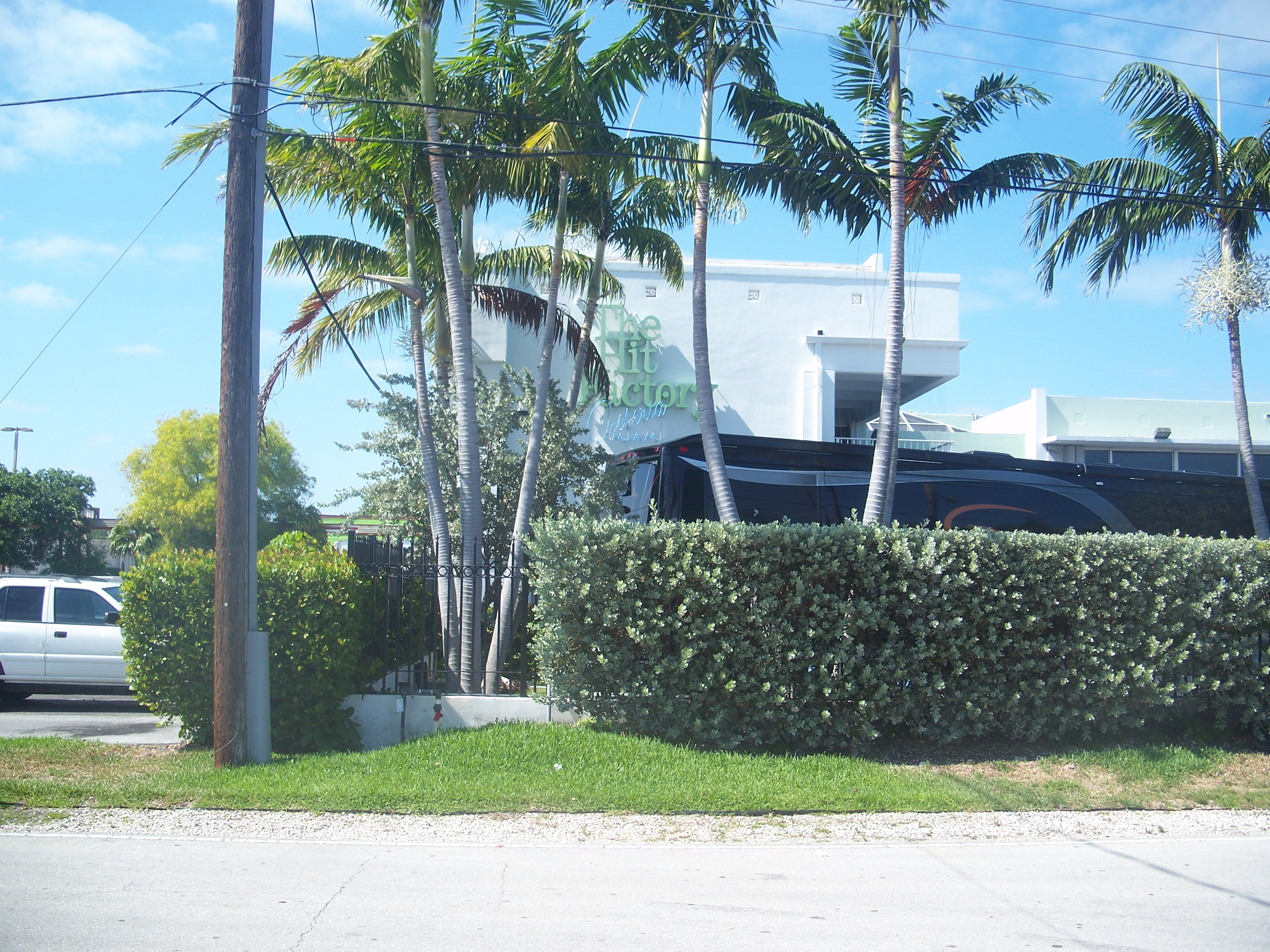
Criteria Studios was one of various studios the album was recorded at.

The recording for Update commenced in November 2016, while its last known session was held on June 7, 2017, with Yandel and American singer Jennifer Lopez. Yandel worked on 30 songs, 14 of which were eventually included. Producers of the album include Puerto Rican producers Tainy, Haze, Jumbo, DJ Luian, and Mambo Kingz, and Colombian producers Sky, The Rude Boys, and Bullnene. Tainy, Haze, and Jumbo produced five, four, and two tracks, respectively. Sky produced two songs, while The Rude Boys, Bullnene, DJ Luian and Mambo Kingz produced or co-produced one track on the album. The record was mastered by Mike Fuller at his studio Fullersound in Florida, USA.

== Release ==
Update was released on September 8, 2017, under Sony Music Latin. In the United States, the album debuted at number 108 on the Billboard 200 and at number 2 on the Top Latin Albums chart with 6,000 album-equivalent units, from which 2,000 copies were traditional sales, enough to lead the Latin Album Sales chart. On September 26, 2017, three weeks after its release, the album received a gold (Latin) certification by the Recording Industry Association of America for units of over 30,000 sales plus album-equivalent units.

=== Singles ===
The lead single "Mi Religión" was released digitally on May 5, 2017. A music video directed by Carlos Pérez and filmed at the Coyote Dry Lake Bed in Barstow, California premiered on May 26, 2017. In the United States, the song peaked at number 25 on Hot Latin Songs on July 15, 2017. Internationally, it reached number 27 in Venezuela, number 47 on Billboard's Mexico Español Airplay chart, and number 93 in Spain.

"Explícale" was released on August 11, 2017, alongside its music video, directed by Fernando Lugo and filmed in Miami, Florida. It peaked at number 29 on the US Hot Latin Songs chart on September 30, 2017. Internationally, it reached number 58 in Spain.

The third single "Como Antes" was released on September 8, 2017, alongside the album and a music video directed by Jessy Terrero and filmed in Miami. In October 2017, the song peaked at number 16 on Bubbling Under Hot 100 Singles and at number 7 on US Hot Latin Songs. Internationally, the song reached number 7 in Paraguay, number 9 in El Salvador, number 12 in Chile, number 17 in Guatemala, number 18 in Dominican Republic, number 23 in Venezuela, number 38 in Ecuador, and number 48 in Colombia.

Promotional songs of Update were released every Friday since mid-August until the release of the album. "Solo Mía" featuring Maluma was released on August 18, 2017, and reached number 50 in Spain and number 9 on the US Latin Digital Songs chart. "No Quiero Amores" featuring Ozuna was released on August 24, 2017. "Muy Personal" featuring J Balvin was released on September 1, 2017.

=== Tour ===
Update Tour is the third concert tour by Yandel, whose first leg will start on September 16, 2017, in La Romana, Dominican Republic and will end on December 14, 2017, in Monterrey, Mexico.

Update Tour
Date	City	Country	Place
September 16, 2017	La Romana	Dominican Republic	Anfiteatro Altos de Chavón
September 22, 2017	Los Angeles	United States	La Boom
September 30, 2017	Bogotá	Colombia	Hipódromo de los Andes
October 5, 2017	Guayaquil	Ecuador	Estadio Alberto Spencer
October 7, 2017	Quito	Ecuador	Coliseo General Rumiñahui
TBA	Medellín	Colombia	TBA
October 8, 2017	Miami	United States	TBA
October 13, 2017	Santa Rosa	United States	TBA
October 26, 2017	Los Angeles	United States	TBA
October 28, 2017	San José	Costa Rica	TBA
November 10, 2017	New York	United States	TBA
November 12, 2017	Dallas	United States	TBA
November 16, 2017	Las Vegas	United States	TBA
November 18, 2017	Los Angeles	United States	TBA
November 30, 2017	Hartford	United States	TBA
December 2, 2017	Santiago	Chile	TBA
December 8, 2017	Trujillo	Peru	TBA
December 9, 2017	Lima	Peru	TBA
December 14, 2017	Monterrey	Mexico	TBA

== Track listing ==
No.	Title	Writer(s)	Producer(s)	Length
1.	"Como Antes" (featuring Wisin)	Llandel Veguilla; Juan Luis Morera; Marco Masis; Victor Viera	Tainy; Jumbo	3:30
2.	"No Pare"	Veguilla; Masis; Jeannelyz Marcano	Tainy	3:45
3.	"Llégale" (featuring Zion & Lennox)	Veguilla; Felix Ortíz; Gabriel Pizarro; Marcano; Viera	Jumbo	3:33
4.	"Mi Religión"	Veguilla; Egbert Rosa; Jesús Nieves	Haze	3:57
5.	"Solo Mía" (featuring Maluma)	Veguilla; Juan Luis Londoño; Bryan Lezcano; Kevin Jiménez; Marcano	The Rude Boys	3:23
6.	"Muy Personal" (featuring J Balvin)	Veguilla; José Álvaro Osorio; Alejandro Patiño; Marcano; Alejandro Ramirez	Sky; Bullnene	3:29
7.	"Bésame"	Veguilla; Ramirez; René Cano; Edwin Montes	Sky	3:31
8.	"Si Se Da" (featuring Plan B)	Veguilla; Orlando Valle; Edwin Vázquez; Rosa; Nieves	Haze	3:55
9.	"No Quiero Amores" (featuring Ozuna)	Veguilla; Juan Carlos Ozuna; Masis; Vicente Saavedra; José Antonio Aponte; Siggy Vázquez; Jean Hernández	Tainy	3:23
10.	"Aprovéchame"	Veguilla; Masis; Nieves	Tainy	3:24
11.	"Dónde Estás" (featuring Luis Fonsi)	Veguilla; Luis Rodríguez; Masis; Christian Ramos; Roberto Vázquez; Ismael Guerra	Tainy	3:25
12.	"Todo Lo Que Quiero" (featuring Becky G)	Veguilla; Rebbeca Marie Gomez; Rosa; Nieves	Haze	3:53
13.	"Cuando Se Da"	Veguilla; Rosa; Nieves	Haze	4:04
14.	"Explícale" (featuring Bad Bunny)	Veguilla; Benito Martínez; Juan Frias; Pablo Fuentes; Luian Malavé; Edgar Semper; Xavier Semper	DJ Luian; Mambo Kingz	3:43
Total length:				50:55

== Personnel ==
- José Antonio Aponte – songwriting (9)
- Ángel Almodovar – A&R
- J Balvin – songwriting, lead vocals (6)
- Becky G – songwriting, lead vocals (12)
- Bad Bunny – songwriting, lead vocals (14)
- Bullnene – producer (6)
- Willy Colón – acoustic guitar (4)
- Miguel Correa – assistant engineer
- Edwin Díaz – assistant engineer
- Earcandy – recording engineer (all), mixing (all), songwriting (11)
- Luis Fonsi – songwriting, lead vocals (11)
- Juan Frias – songwriting (14)
- Pablo Fuentes – songwriting (14)
- Mike Fuller – mastering
- Ismael Guerra – songwriting (11)
- Haze – producer, songwriting (4, 8, 12, 13)
- Mambo Kingz – producer, songwriting (14)
- DJ Luian – producer, songwriting (14)
- Maluma – songwriting, lead vocals (5)
- Jeannelyz Marcano – songwriting (2, 3, 5, 6)
- Andre Mendonza – assistant engineer
- Mosty – songwriting (6)
- Jesús Nieves – songwriting (4, 8, 10, 12, 13)
- Jumbo – producer, songwriting (1, 3)
- Ozuna – songwriting, lead vocals (9)
- Plan B – songwriting, lead vocals (8)
- Christian Ramos – songwriting (11)
- Alejandro Reglero – A&R
- The Rude Boys – producer, songwriting (5)
- Vicente Saavedra – songwriting (9)
- Tainy – producer, songwriting (1, 2, 9–11)
- Siggy Vázquez – songwriting (9)
- Sky – producer, songwriting (6)
- Wisin – songwriting, lead vocals (1)
- YannC El Armónico – songwriting (9)
- Yandel – songwriting, lead vocals, executive producer
- Zion & Lennox – songwriting, lead vocals (3)

== Charts ==
=== Weekly charts ===
Chart (2017)	Peak position
US Billboard 200	108
US Top Latin Albums (Billboard)	2
US Latin Rhythm Albums (Billboard)	2

=== Year-end charts ===
Chart (2017)	Position
US Top Latin Albums (Billboard)	35
Chart (2018)	Position
US Top Latin Albums (Billboard)	16
Chart (2019)	Position
US Top Latin Albums (Billboard)	67

=== Songs ===
Title	Year	Peak chart positions			Certifications (sales thresholds)
Title	Year	US Latin	SPA	VEN	Certifications (sales thresholds)
"Mi Religión"	2017	25	93	27	
"Explícale"	2017	29	58	—	
"Solo Mía"	2017	31	—	—	
"Como Antes"	2017	7	—	23	

== Certifications ==
Region	Certification	Certified units/sales
United States (RIAA)	3× Platinum (Latin)	180,000^{‡}
^{‡} Sales+streaming figures based on certification alone.
