= Mi Religión =

Single by Yandel

from the album #Update
- Released: May 5, 2017
- Genre: Reggaeton
- Length: 3:57
- Label: Sony Latin
- Songwriter(s): Llandel Veguilla; Egbert Rosa; Jesús Nieves
- Producer(s): Haze

Yandel singles chronology
"Hey DJ" (2017)	"Mi Religión" (2017)	"Explícale" (2017)

Music video
- "Mi Religión" on YouTube

"Mi Religión" (My Religion) is a single by Puerto Rican singer and songwriter Yandel from his fourth studio album Update. It was released on May 5, 2017, under Sony Music Latin as the record's lead single. A music video premiered on May 26, 2017. The song was written by Yandel, Egbert "Haze" Rosa and Jesús Nieves, and was produced by Haze.

== Composition ==
"Mi Religión" is a reggaeton song composed in common time (4/4 time). It was written by Yandel, Egbert "Haze" Rosa Cintrón and Jesús Nieves Cortés. Haze and Willy Colón, producer and guitarist in Yandel's 2015 single "Encantadora", respectively, maintain their roles for "Mi Religión". According to Yandel, the song "goes back to the roots of reggaeton".

== Chart performance ==
In the United States, "Mi Religión" peaked at number 25 on the US Hot Latin Songs chart on July 15, 2017. Internationally, it reached number 47 on Billboard's Mexico Español Airplay chart, number 27 in Venezuela, and number 93 in Spain.

== Music video ==
The music video premiered on May 26, 2017, on Yandel's Vevo channel. The clip was directed by Puerto Rican director and designer Carlos Pérez and was filmed at the Coyote Dry Lake Bed in Barstow, California, USA. Yandel and Carlos Pérez previously worked on music videos for "Te Deseo" (2013, with Wisin), "Hasta Abajo" (2013), "Moviendo Caderas" (2014, with Daddy Yankee), and "Encantadora" (2015). The music video features Miss Universe Puerto Rico 2010 Mariana Vicente while Yandel is shown performing the song standing on the ground and while driving a luxurious car through the Mojave Desert.

== Credits and personnel ==
Credits adapted from Tidal.

- Willy Colón – acoustic guitar
- Miguel Correa – assistant engineer
- Edwin Díaz – assistant engineer
- Mike Fuller – mastering
- Andre Mendoza – assistant engineer
- Jesús Nieves Cortés – songwriting
- Egbert "Haze" Rosa Cintrón – producer, songwriting
- Roberto "Earcandy" Vázquez – recording engineer, mixing
- Yandel – lead vocals, songwriting

== Charts ==
=== Weekly charts ===
Chart (2017)	Peak position
Mexico Español Airplay (Billboard)	47
Spain (PROMUSICAE)	93
US Hot Latin Songs (Billboard)	25
US Latin Airplay (Billboard)	13
US Latin Rhythm Airplay (Billboard)	9
Venezuela (National-Report)	27

=== Monthly charts ===
Chart (2017)	Position
Venezuela (National-Report)	31

== Certifications ==
Region	Certification	Certified units/sales
United States (RIAA)	3× Platinum (Latin)	180,000^{‡}
^{‡} Sales+streaming figures based on certification alone.
