= Legacy: De Líder a Leyenda Tour =

Live album by Yandel
- Released: February 3, 2015
- Recorded: October 4, 2014; José Miguel Agrelot Coliseum (San Juan, Puerto Rico)
- Genre: Reggaeton
- Length: 34:46 (Standard Edition); 72:14 (Deluxe Edition)
- Label: Sony Music Latin
- Producer: Yandel (also executive); Earcandy; Haze; Ramón Sánchez; Madmusick; Knightrydaz; Nesty; Tainy; Nely; DJ Luian; Noize; Los Harmonicos

Yandel chronology
Legacy: De Líder a Leyenda Tour (EP) (2014)	Legacy: De Líder a Leyenda Tour (2015)	Dangerous (2015)

Legacy: De Líder a Leyenda Tour is the first live album by Puerto Rican artist Yandel, released on February 3, 2015 on Sony Music Latin. It was recorded at the José Miguel Agrelot Coliseum in San Juan, Puerto Rico on October 4, 2014 during his De Líder a Leyenda Tour. It featured guest appearances by Tony Dize, J Alvarez, Gadiel and Farruko. The CD release features 10 selected tracks of the 2-hours live performance along with a Deluxe Edition which includes 10 additional tracks, 5 of them included previously on Legacy: De Líder a Leyenda Tour - EP.

== Critical reception ==
Thom Jurek of AllMusic said that the album "captures the audio portion of Yandel's first solo tour in 2014, after his split with longtime musical partner Wisin in one of the more successful pop duos in late 20th century Latin music history." -- "Not only are all of the big tracks from De Lider a Leyenda done in absolutely grand live fashion -- but there are several surprises as well."

== Promotional singles from the Deluxe Edition ==
- The salsa version of "En La Oscuridad" was released on July 8, 2014 as promotional single from the Deluxe edition of the album with a digital download release, featuring Puerto Rican recording artist, Gilberto Santa Rosa.
- The remix version of "Plakito" featuring additional vocals from Puerto Rican singer Farruko and Gadiel (originally featured on its album version), was released on September 25, 2014 as second promotional single from the Deluxe edition of the album.

=== Streaming releases ===
- "Trepando Paredes" was premiered on August 9, 2014 during the radio show "El Coyote The Show".
- The remix version of "Déjate Amar" featuring D.OZi and Reykon, was also premiered during "El Coyote The Show", on November 22, 2014.

== Track listing ==
Standard edition
No.	Title	Length
1.	"Hable De Ti" (Live)	3:34
2.	"Permítame" (Live) (featuring Tony Dize)	3:42
3.	"Te Suelto El Pelo" (Live)	2:12
4.	"Dembow" (Live)	1:33
5.	"Junto Al Amanecer" (Live) (featuring J Alvarez)	3:42
6.	"Para Irnos (A Fuego)" (Live) (featuring J Alvarez and Gadiel)	3:37
7.	"6 AM" (Live) (featuring Farruko)	4:13
8.	"Passion Whine" (Live) (featuring Farruko)	3:27
9.	"Hasta Abajo" (Live)	3:58
10.	"Moviendo Caderas" (Live)	4:48

Deluxe edition
No.	Title	Length
11.	"Trepando Paredes"	3:21
12.	"En la Oscuridad" (Salsa Version) (featuring Gilberto Santa Rosa)	3:47
13.	"Olé"	4:07
14.	"Me Enamoré"	3:10
15.	"Mi Nena"	3:38
16.	"Jaque Mate"	3:33
17.	"Déjate Amar" (Remix) (featuring Reykon & Dozi)	4:24
18.	"Duro Hasta Abajo" (featuring Gadiel)	2:56
19.	"Plakito" (Remix) (featuring Gadiel and Farruko)	3:26
20.	"La Calle Me Llama" (featuring Farruko, Ñengo Flow & Dozi)	5:07

== Personnel ==
Credits adapted from AllMusic.

- Vocals - Adlin Torres
- Composer - Alberto Lozado Algarin
- A&R - Alejandro Reglero
- Tenor Saxophone - Angel Torres
- Cajon, Palmas - Carlos Andrea
- Composer - Carlos Efrén Reyes Rosado
- Creative Director - Carlos Pérez
- Mastering - Chris Gehringer
- Composer - Christian Ramos
- Featured Artist - D.Ozi
- Composer - Daddy Yankee
- Composer - Daliah King
- Producer - Daniel Luis "Noize" Rodrigues
- Guitar - Diego De Cáceres
- Mixing, Producer - DJ Luian
- Composer - Edwin Vázquez Vega
- Composer, Producer - Egbert "Haze" Rosa Cintrón
- Featured Artist - El General Gadiel
- Composer - Eliezer Palacios
- Composer, Producer - Ernesto Padilla
- Composer - Fabian Worell
- Featured Artist - Farruko
- Composer - Francisco Saldaña
- Composer, Engineer - Gabriel Rodríguez
- Composer, Guest Artist - Gadiel Veguilla Malavé
- Composer - Geancarlos Rivera Tapia
- Featured Artist - Gilberto Santa Rosa
- Featured Artist - J Álvarez
- Composer - Javid David Alvarez
- Congas - Jean Carlos Camuñas
- Composer - Jean Rodriguez
- Trumpet - Jesús Alonso
- Guitar - Joash Caraballo
- Composer - Jonathan Rivera
- Guitar - Jonathan Whynock
- Trombone - Jorge Diaz
- Marketing - Jorge Sanchez
- Composer - Jose Alvaro Osorio Balvin
- Trumpet - Jose Ruiz
- Composer, Producer - Josias De La Cruz
- Engineer - Juan G. Rivera
- Composer - Juan Luis Morera
- Marketing - Juan Paz
- Composer - Juana S. Guerrido
- Composer - Justin Quiles
- Composer - Llandel Veguilla
- Composer - Luis Otero
- Producer - Madmusick
- Composer, Producer - Marcos Masis
- Drums - Marcus Thomas
- Producer - Nelly El Arma Secreta
- Composer - Nelson Diaz
- Composer - Nelson Diaz Martinez
- Photography - Omar Cruz
- Timbales - Pedro Morales
- Bass Guitar - Pedro Pérez
- Composer - Pedro Santana
- DJ - Ramon Gomez
- Arranger, Keyboards, Piano, Producer, Programming - Ramón Sánchez
- Featured Artist - Reykon
- Composer, Engineer, Mixing, Musical Director, Producer - Roberto "Tito" Vazquez
- Composer, Producer - Robin Méndez
- Bass - Rohan Reid
- Engineer - Rolando Alejandro
- Assistant Engineer - Sam Allison
- Bongos - Savier Diaz
- Composer - Sean Paul Henriques
- Project Manager - Soraya Ramirez
- Featured Artist - Tony Dize
- Composer - Tony Feliciano
- Composer - Victor Delgado
- Composer - Victor Viera Moore
- Keyboards - Wilfredo Caraballo
- Primary Artist - Yandel
- Featured Artist - Ñengo Flow

== Charts ==
=== Weekly charts ===
Chart (2015)	Peak position
US Top Latin Albums (Billboard)	5
US Latin Rhythm Albums (Billboard)	1

=== Year-end charts ===
Chart (2015)	Position
US Top Latin Albums (Billboard)	55
