= My Religion =

My Religion may refer to:

== Books ==
- What I Believe (Tolstoy), an 1884 book by Leo Tolstoy, first published in English as My Religion 1885
- My Religion (Keller book), a 1927 book by Helen Keller, republished as Light in My Darkness 2000

== Music ==
- My Religion (album), an album by Norwegian band TNT
- "My Religion", a 2018 song by Dierks Bentley from the album The Mountain (Dierks Bentley album)
- "My Religion", a 2004 song by Ryan Starr
- "Mi Religión" ("My Religion"), a single by Yandel
