= Dangerous (Yandel album) =

2015 studio album by Yandel

Studio album by Yandel
- Released: November 6, 2015
- Recorded: 2014–15
- Studios: Earcandy Studio (Orlando, U.S.); Studio DMI (Las Vegas, U.S.)
- Genres: Reggaeton; latin pop
- Length: 58:41
- Label: Sony Music
- Producers: Yandel (exec.); Tainy; Jumbo; Luny Tunes; Saga WhiteBlack; The Mekanics; Nely; Ray Casillas; Predikador

Yandel chronology
| Legacy: De Líder a Leyenda Tour (2015) | Dangerous (2015) | #Update (2017) |

Singles from Dangerous
- 1. "Encantadora" Released: October 2, 2015; 2. "Nunca Me Olvides" Released: July 12, 2016; 3. "Loba" Released: October 7, 2016

Professional ratings
Review scores
| Source | Rating |
|---|---|
| Allmusic | 3.5/5 stars |

Dangerous is the third studio album (fourth overall) by Puerto Rican reggaeton and pop artist Yandel, of the duo Wisin & Yandel, released worldwide on November 6, 2015 through Sony Music Latin. Contrary of his previous studio album, De Líder A Leyenda, Dangerous focuses mainly on reggaeton music, with some synthpop and electropop exceptions. It features reggaeton artists including Nicky Jam, Tego Calderón, Gadiel and De La Ghetto, as well as artists from other genres like Lil Jon, Pitbull, French Montana, Future, Shaggy and Alex Sensation. As of March 2016, the album includes only one single: "Encantadora", released on October, as well as a promotional electropop song titled "Somos Uno", released on September 18, 2015. It reached the top position on Billboard's Top Latin Albums chart, surpassing 5,000 copies sold as of November 12, 2015. The album also reached the 10th position on Billboard's Best Latin Albums of 2015 ranking, being one of the two reggaeton albums that were chosen by the magazine's editors, the other one being The Last Don 2 by Don Omar, who reached the 9th position. Dangerous received a latin platinum certification in October 2016 by the Recording Industry Association of America (RIAA) for surpassing 60,000 copies sold in the United States. Its lead single, "Encantadora", was certified with 2× Platinum in Spain by the PROMUSICAE and later with 5× Platinum (Latin) by the RIAA. Dangerous won a Latin American Music Award for Album of the Year on October 6, 2016 and received a nomination for a Lo Nuestro Award for Urban Album of the Year.

== Background ==
After Wisin & Yandel's hiatus in the mid 2013, both artists had a great success with their respective studio albums, Wisin with El Regreso del Sobreviviente and Yandel with his Latin Grammy Award nominee gold record De Líder a Leyenda, as well as their hit singles as soloists. Yandel released two albums more before Dangerous: an EP and a live album both recorded at mid 2014 and titled Legacy: De Líder a Leyenda Tour, reaching the top position on Billboard's Latin Rhythm Albums. On the other hand, Wisin focused entirely on his next studio album, Los Vaqueros: La Trilogía, which was later published in September 2015.

In that year, before Dangerous' release, Yandel was nominated for four Lo Nuestro Award and a Latin American Music Award, with no wins, as well as two nominations at the Latin Grammy Awards in November, two weeks after his album's release. Dangerous was the last album in which the rapper Christian Ramos, most known as Syko, worked as lyricist, as he died in his sleep in Orlando on December 27, 2015. Syko had co-written also in Yandel's previous two albums in the songs "La Cama" and "Jaque Mate".

The catchphrase "Dangerous" was first used in Yandel's 2011 song "Tumbao" featuring De La Ghetto (written by them and Tainy), from the duo's deluxe edition of the album Los Vaqueros: El Regreso, and wasn't used again until his 2014 EP Legacy: De Líder a Leyenda Tour.

In March 2016, Yandel became the first Puerto Rican artist to sign to Roc Nation, an American entertainment company founded by the rapper Jay Z in 2008. This will probably led to a collaboration wished by him with the singer Rihanna, who is also signed to the label.

== Production and release ==
Dangerous was recorded between 2014 and 2015 at Earcandy Studios in Orlando, with Lil Jon's vocals on "Calentura Trap Edition" being recorded at Studio DMI in Las Vegas. 16 songs were chosen out of 30 recorded for the album. The song "Calentura" was released on March 16, 2015 as the album's lead single, reaching the top position on Billboard's Latin Rhythm Airplay chart in August. On May was released a remix version featuring Puerto Rican rapper Tempo and on September was released a trap version featuring US rapper Lil Jon, which replaced the original "Calentura" in the album's track list. The electropop "Somos Uno" was released on September and on October was released "Encantadora" as the lead single. Dangerous was finally published on November 6 through Sony Music Latin, reaching the top position on Billboard's Top Latin Albums chart after a week of its release. After the album's success, Yandel was ranked 28th on Billboard's Year-End Top Latin Artists chart.

Yandel working on the album at Criteria Studios in Miami. December 2014.

There are two songs that were originally released with Yandel as a featured artist. "Báilame" was released on July 31, 2015 as an Alex Sensation's single from an upcoming album, and its music video was published on his VEVO channel on October 22. The music was taken from Oniel Anubis' 2014 namesake single, while the chorus was taken from that song and Latin Fresh's 1997 single "Ella Se Arrebata". "Yo Soy Del Barrio" was first shown in August 2015 on the radio show El Coyote The Show (part of La Nueva 94.7 FM radio station) as a purely promotional song for Tego Calderon's concert in the José Miguel Agrelot Coliseum. Its jingle version is different from the Dangerous one because Tego changed his lyrics.

Yandel's voice was recorded using two Neve 1073 preamplifiers, a Vocoder Korg voice codec, a Solid-State Channel Strip preamplifier, The Mouth software by Native Instruments and Melodyne software. As well as on his previous studio album, his voice was multitracked on all songs and also has some delays.

The entire album was co-written by Yandel with additional lyrics by the song's producer and/or other lyricists. Dangerous hasn't a lead producer but it has work from various, such as Tainy (who produced 4 songs), Jumbo and Luny Tunes (who produced 2) and the rest (Onell Flow, Motiff, Saga Whiteblack, Haze, DJ Luian, Alex Killer, Nesty, Alex Sensation, Ray Casillas, The Mekanics, Nely and Predikador) who produced only one. Roberto Vazquez, most known as Earcandy, recorded and mixed almost the entire album, being "Riversa" (recorded by Luny Tunes and Predikador, mixed by them and Menes from the production duo Los De La Nazza) the only exception. The album was mastered by the producer Mike Fuller, who also mastered other reggaeton artists' albums including The Last Don 2 by Don Omar, Visionary by Farruko, La Melodía De La Calle: 3rd Season by Tony Dize and La Familia B Sides by J Balvin. Fuller also mastered albums from famous singers including Ricardo Montaner, Ricky Martin, David Bisbal, Chayanne, Roberto Carlos, Vico C and the duo Pimpinela. As to musical instruments, the album has the electronic keyboard and synthesizers as the lead ones, with exceptions including an acoustic guitar in "No Sales De Mi Mente", "Encantadora", "Imaginar" and "Yo Soy Del Barrio", as well as a trombone in "Fantasía" and an electric guitar in "Yo Soy Del Barrio". The album focuses mainly on reggaeton music (mixing it with reggae fusion in "Encantadora"), with electropop, latin pop and hip hop exceptions, and includes more collaborations than his previous studio album, De Líder A Leyenda, which has four out of 17 songs (representing the 23% of the album), while Dangerous has nine out of 16 (representing the 56%).

== Singles ==
- "Encantadora" was released as the lead single on October 2, 2015. It was written by Yandel, Farruko, Eduardo Vargas and Haze (who also produced the song) and talks about a beautiful and charming woman who Yandel wants as his couple. It reached the top position at Billboard's Latin Airplay and Latin Rhythm Airplay charts in January 2016. The music video, directed by Jessy Terrero and filmed in Puerto Rico, was published on November 30, 2015 through Yandel's Vevo channel, surpassing 200 million views on its first 7 months. Yandel performed the song at the Lo Nuestro Awards in February 2016. The single was certified gold by the PROMUSICAE on March 17, 2016 and later platinum on May 5. A remix version featuring Farruko and the duo Zion & Lennox was officially released on March 18, 2016.
- "Nunca Me Olvides" was released as the second single on July 12, 2016 alongside its music video (directed by Carlos Pérez and filmed in Los Angeles), published through Yandel's Vevo channel on YouTube. The song is a romantic reggaeton about Yandel wanting his ex-girlfriend back in order to be together again. It reached the 15th position on Billboard's Hot Latin Songs chart on September 24, 2016. The music video shows Yandel and his girlfriend having a car accident. He is later waiting for her in a hospital but she suffers of amnesia, so he goes to a church to pray for several hours, but his spouse apparently dies. His figure then disappears while his girlfriend enters the place, suggesting that Yandel died or left. The video shares some similarities with Daddy Yankee's "Llamado de Emergencia", released in September 2008.
- "Loba" was released on October 23, 2015, two weeks before the album's release, being its last promotional song. It was written by Yandel, Justin Quiles and Tainy, who is also the producer. It is a reggaeton song about a woman that goes frequently to nightclubs, attracting men with her figure and personality just for fun. It is going to be released as the third single on October 7, 2016 alongside its official music video, directed by Jessy Terrero and filmed in Miami during July. Former Miss Florida Génesis Dávila will be the lead model on the music video.

Other releases

- "Calentura Trap Edition" was released on September 8, 2015 featuring US Grammy Award-winner rapper Lil Jon, serving as an EDM trap version to the original "Calentura", released on March 16, 2015, which was originally the album's lead single until its suppression from the track list. Both artists performed the song together at the Latin American Music Awards of 2015.
- "Somos Uno" was released on September 18, 2015. It is an electropop song with a social theme, saying that there's no differences between human beings, promoting to follow one's dreams. The song was written by Yandel, Syko, Earcandy and Nesty (who is also the producer). It reached the 49th position on Billboard's Latin Digital Songs chart in October 2015. Yandel performed the song at the Copa América Centenario's draw on February 21, 2016.
- "No Sales De Mi Mente" was released on October 16, 2015 and features Puerto Rican Latin Grammy award-winner Nicky Jam, being the song written by both artists and Saga Whiteblack, who also produced it. The song is a romantic reggaeton which tells the story of a man who can't forget an old love. It reached the 25th position on Billboard's Latin Digital Songs chart on November 7, 2015. The song is going to be released as the third single during 2016.
- "Mi Combo" was released as a Spiff TV single on April 1, 2016 for his next studio album, which will involve several urban artists. Before that, the song was only available on the physical version of Dangerous. It features US BET Hip Hop Award-winner rapper Future and was written by them, Foreign Teck and Spiff TV, and was produced by the production duo The Mekanics, Tainy and Nely. The song musically mixes reggaeton and trap, and Yandel's lyrics suggests that it is a diss track. It reached the 19th position on Billboard's Tropical Songs chart on June 18, 2016. The music video, directed by Spiff TV, was published on April 19, 2016 through Yandel's Vevo Channel.
- A salsa version of "Imaginar" was released on May 6, 2016 and features fellow Puerto Rican singer Víctor Manuelle. This version peaked at number one on the Billboard Tropical Songs chart.

== Dangerous Tour ==
Dangerous Tour is the second concert tour by Yandel, being De Líder a Leyenda VIP Tour his first one, which was from June to November 2014. After some months promoting his album and his future tour through other concerts around the Americas, Dangerous Tour started on October 7, 2016 in Puerto Rico, and will end on November 6, 2016 in Orlando, United States.

| Date | City | Country | Place |
|---|---|---|---|
| October 7, 2016 | Hato Rey, San Juan | Puerto Rico | José Miguel Agrelot Coliseum |
| October 9, 2016 | Chicago, Illinois | United States | Aragon Ballroom |
| October 12, 2016 | Los Angeles, California | United States | Hollywood Palladium |
| October 13, 2016 | San Jose, California | United States | City National Civic |
| October 16, 2016 | Las Vegas, Nevada | United States | The AXIS |
| October 18, 2016 | Phoenix, Arizona | United States | Comerica Theatre |
| October 19, 2016 | El Paso, Texas | United States | El Paso County Coliseum |
| October 21, 2016 | Houston, Texas | United States | Revention Music Center |
| October 23, 2016 | Dallas, Texas | United States | South Side Ballroom |
| October 26, 2016 | Indianapolis, Indiana | United States | Egyptian Room at Old National Center |
| October 28, 2016 | Washington D.C. | United States | DAR Constitution Hall |
| October 29, 2016 | Boston, Massachusetts | United States | Orpheum Theatre |
| November 1, 2016 | New York City, New York | United States | Hammerstein Ballroom |
| November 4, 2016 | Allentown, Pennsylvania | United States | PPL Center |
| November 5, 2016 | Miami, Florida | United States | American Airlines Arena |
| November 6, 2016 | Orlando, Florida | United States | House of Blues |

== Commercial performance ==
According to Nielsen SoundScan, Dangerous sold 5,000 copies in the United States during its first week of release, a thousand less sales than his previous studio album, De Líder a Leyenda, which later received a latin gold certification by the Recording Industry Association of America (RIAA) for surpassing 30,000 copies sold in the US. Dangerous remained one week on the top position of Billboard's Top Latin Albums chart, in which it appeared 17 non-consecutive weeks from November 2015 to March 2016. In October 2016, Yandel was surprised by Puerto Rican boxer José Cotto, who gave him two RIAA certifications: Platinum (Latin) for Dangerous (60.000 copies sold) and 5× Platinum (Latin) for his single "Encantadora" (300.000 copies sold), which was also certified with 2× Platinum in Spain a few months before.

== Track listing ==
| No. | Title | Writer(s) | Producer(s) | Length |
|---|---|---|---|---|
| 1. | "Calentura Trap Edition" (featuring Lil Jon) | Llandel Veguilla; Jonathan Smith; Gabriel Labrón; Alberto Duprey; Egbert Rosa | Onell Flow | 3:39 |
| 2. | "Nunca Me Olvides" | L. Veguilla; Victor Viera | Jumbo | 4:01 |
| 3. | "Loba" | L. Veguilla; Marcos Masis; Justin Quiles | Tainy | 3:34 |
| 4. | "Fantasía" | L. Veguilla; José Torres; Juan Santana; Oscar Hernandez | Motiff; Santana (co.) | 4:29 |
| 5. | "No Sales De Mi Mente" (featuring Nicky Jam) | L. Veguilla; Nick Rivera; Christian Mena | Saga WhiteBlack | 3:24 |
| 6. | "Asesina" (featuring Pitbull) | L. Veguilla; Armando Perez; M. Masis; Jesús Nieves | Tainy | 3:53 |
| 7. | "Encantadora" | L. Veguilla; Carlos Reyes; Eduardo Vargas; E. Rosa | Haze | 4:00 |
| 8. | "Déjame Explorar" (featuring French Montana) | L. Veguilla; Karim Kharbouch | DJ Luian; Alex Killer | 4:04 |
| 9. | "Imaginar" | L. Veguilla; V. Viera | Jumbo | 4:01 |
| 10. | "Somos Uno" | L. Veguilla; Christian Ramos; Ernesto Padilla; Roberto Vazquez | Nesty | 3:00 |
| 11. | "Báilame" (featuring Shaggy and Alex Sensation) | L. Veguilla; Javier Salazar; Orville Burrell; Oniel Rosario; Roberto Reyes | Alex Sensation | 3:54 |
| 12. | "Bella, Bella" | L. Veguilla; E. Vargas; M. Masis | Tainy | 3:02 |
| 13. | "Yo Soy Del Barrio" (featuring Tego Calderón) | L. Veguilla; Tegui Calderón; C. Ramos; Alfonso Ordonez; Ramón Casillas | Ray Casillas | 2:59 |
| 14. | "Mi Combo" (Spiff TV featuring Yandel & Future) | L. Veguilla; Nayvadius Wilburn; Michael Hernandez; Carlos Suarez | The Mekanics; Nely; Tainy | 3:31 |
| 15. | "Tu Cura" (featuring Gadiel) | L. Veguilla; Gadiel Veguilla; William Ríos | Luny Tunes | 3:49 |
| 16. | "Riversa" (featuring De La Ghetto) | L. Veguilla; Rafael Castillo; Victor Delgado; Francisco Saldaña; Victor Cabrera | Luny Tunes; Predikador | 3:21 |
| Total length: | | | | 58:41 |

== Credits and personnel ==
Most credits adapted from Allmusic and the CD information. The list's order is based on the track list.

Artists and production

- Llandel Veguilla: Lead vocals (all), background vocals (2, 3, 5, 6, 9–12, 14–16), multitracked vocals (all) and lyrics (all).
- Roberto Vazquez: Mixing (all but 16), recording engineer (all but 16) and lyrics (10).
- Mike Fuller: Mastering.
- Jonathan Smith: Lead vocals and lyrics on "Calentura Trap Edition".
- Egbert Rosa: Lyrics (1, 7) and producer (7). (Note: Egbert Rosa, most known as Haze, was also the producer of the original "Calentura".)
- Gabriel Lebrón: Lyrics on "Calentura Trap Edition". (Note: Gabriel Lebrón, member of the production duo Los Harmónicos, was also the producer of the original "Calentura".)
- Alberto Duprey: Lyrics on "Calentura Trap Edition". (Note: Alberto Duprey, member of the production duo Los Harmónicos, was also the producer of the original "Calentura".)
- Nelson Díaz: Producer on "Calentura Trap Edition".
- Nik Hotchkiss: Recording engineer on "Calentura Trap Edition".
- Jacob Mork: Assistant engineer on "Calentura Trap Edition".
- Martin Nieves: Assistant engineer (2–15).
- Victor Viera: Lyrics and producer (2, 9).
- Justin Quiles: Lyrics on "Loba".
- Marcos Masis: Lyrics (3, 6, 12) and producer (3, 6, 12, 14).
- José Torres: Lyrics on "Fantasía".
- Oscar Hernandez: Lyrics on "Fantasía".
- Arbise "Motiff" Gonzalez: Percussion, acoustic guitar, audio programming, engineering and producer on "Fantasía".
- Juan Santana: Co-producer on "Fantasía".
- Efrain Gonzalez: Engineering on "Fantasía".
- Alfonso Ordonez: Engineering (4), lyrics and audio programming (13).
- William Paredes: Trombone on "Fantasía".
- Nick Rivera: Lead vocals, background vocals and lyrics on "No Sales De Mi Mente".
- Christian Mena: Lyrics and producer on "No Sales De Mi Mente".
- Armando Perez: Lead vocals and lyrics on "Asesina".
- Jesús Nieves: Lyrics on "Asesina".
- Carlos Reyes: Lyrics on "Encantadora".
- Eduardo Vargas: Lyrics on "Encantadora".
- William Colon: Acoustic guitar on "Encantadora".
- Karim Kharbouch: Lead vocals and lyrics on "Déjame Explorar".
- Luian Malave: Producer on "Déjame Explorar".
- Joseph Negron: Producer on "Déjame Explorar".
- Christian Ramos: Lyrics (10, 13).
- Ernesto Padilla: Lyrics and producer on "Somos Uno".
- Orville Burrel: Lead vocals and lyrics on "Báilame".
- Javier Salazar: Lead vocals, lyrics and producer on "Báilame".
- Oniel Rosario: Lyrics on "Báilame". (Note: Part of the chorus on "Báilame" was taken from Oniel Anubis' namesake 2014 single.)
- Roberto Reyes: Lyrics on "Báilame". (Note: Roberto Reyes, most known as Latin Fresh, isn't officially credited as lyricist in "Báilame". A verse in the song was taken from the chorus of his 1997 single "Ella Se Arrebata".)
- Tegui Calderón: Lead vocals and lyrics on "Yo Soy Del Barrio".
- Ramón Casillas: Lyrics and producer on "Yo Soy Del Barrio".
- Nayvadius Wilburn: Lead vocals, background vocals and lyrics on "Mi Combo".
- Carlos Suarez: Lyrics on "Mi Combo".
- Michael Hernandez: Lyrics and producer on "Mi Combo".
- Rico Evans: Producer on "Mi Combo".
- Josias de la Cruz: Producer on "Mi Combo".
- Gadiel Veguilla: Lead vocals and lyrics on "Tu Cura".
- William Ríos: Lyrics on "Tu Cura".
- Francisco Saldaña: Producer (15, 16), lyrics, recording engineer and mixing (16).
- Victor Cabrera: Producer (15, 16), lyrics and recording engineer (16).
- Rafael Castillo: Lead vocals and lyrics on "Riversa".
- Victor Delgado: Lyrics and producer on "Riversa".
- Eduardo Lopez: Mixing on "Riversa".

Sony Music Entertainment

- Soraya Ramirez: Label manager.
- Andres Wolff: Label manager.
- Carlos Perez: Creative director.
- Jorge Sanchez: Marketing director.
- Alejandro Reglero: A&R.
- Mateo García: Photography.
- Ed Coriano: Fashion Stylist.

Y Entertainment

- Llandel Veguilla: Executive producer.
- Andres Martinez: Management.
- Juan Toro: Booking.
- Blanca Lasalle: Public relations.
- Moises Cortes: A&R.

== Chart performance ==
=== Weekly charts ===
| Chart (2015) | Peak position |
|---|---|
| US Billboard 200 | 101 |
| US Top Latin Albums (Billboard) | 1 |
| US Latin Rhythm Albums (Billboard) | 1 |

=== Year-end charts ===
| Chart (2016) | Position |
|---|---|
| US Top Latin Albums (Billboard) | 37 |
| Chart (2017) | Position |
| US Top Latin Albums (Billboard) | 40 |

=== Songs ===
| Song | Peak chart positions | | | | Certifications |
| Song | US | | | SPA | Certifications |
| Song | Hot Latin Songs | Latin Digital Songs | Tropical Songs | SPA | Certifications |
|---|---|---|---|---|---|
| "Somos Uno" | — | 49 | — | — | |
| "Encantadora" | 3 | 7 | 7 | 24 | PROMUSICAE: 2× Platinum; RIAA: 5× Platinum (Latin) |
| "No Sales De Mi Mente" | — | 25 | — | 61 | |
| "Nunca Me Olvides" | 10 | 22 | 17 | 57 | PROMUSICAE: Gold |
| "Mi Combo" | — | — | 19 | — | |

=== Certifications ===
| Region | Certification | Certified units/sales |
|---|---|---|
| Mexico (AMPROFON) | 2× Platinum | 120,000^{‡} |
| United States (RIAA) | 2× Platinum (Latin) | 120,000^{‡} |
^{‡} Sales+streaming figures based on certification alone.

== Accolades ==
In 2016, Yandel won a Tecla Award and was nominated for a Billboard Latin Music Award. On June 16, he confirmed that the Latin Songwriters Hall of Fame is going to give him the Hero's Special Award during La Musa Awards. Desmond Child and Rudy Pérez, founders of the hall of fame, praised him for his achievements, saying that he created his own musical style and continues to inspire millions of listeners around the world, being a hero for Latin Americans everywhere.

| Date | Recipient | Award | Result |
|---|---|---|---|
| 2015 | Dangerous | Best Latin Albums of 2015 according to Billboard | #10 |
| 2016 | Dangerous | Latin American Music Award for Album of the Year | Won |
| 2016 | Dangerous | Latin American Music Award for Urban Album of the Year | Nominated |
| 2016 | "Encantadora" | Latin American Music Award for Song of the Year | Nominated |
| 2016 | "Encantadora" | Latin American Music Award for Favorite Urban Song | Nominated |
| 2016 | "Encantadora" | Latin Grammy Award for Best Urban Song | Won |
| 2016 | "Encantadora" | Latin Grammy Award for Best Urban Fusion/Performance | Won |
| 2017 | Dangerous | Lo Nuestro Award for Urban Album of the Year | Nominated |
| 2017 | "Encantadora" | Lo Nuestro Award for Urban Song of the Year | Nominated |
