= Legacy: De Líder a Leyenda Tour (EP) =

Legacy: De Líder a Leyenda Tour EP

EP by Yandel
- Released: August 25, 2014
- Genre: Reggaeton
- Length: 17:25
- Label: Sony Music Latin
- Producers: Earcandy; Knightrydaz; Nely; Haze; Madmusick; Tainy

Yandel chronology
De Líder a Leyenda (2013)	Legacy: De Líder a Leyenda Tour EP (2014)	Legacy: De Líder a Leyenda Tour (2015)

Legacy: De Líder a Leyenda Tour EP is an EP by the Puerto Rican recording artist Yandel. It was released on August 25, 2014, by Sony Music Latin. The album has been released on music platforms such as iTunes, Spotify, Amazon and Google Play.

== Album information ==
The album was released to help promote the De Líder a Leyenda Tour. It consists of five songs, fans could choose their favorite song from the EP through his website, and he would perform the winning song as a part of the tour's set list on October 4 at José Miguel Agrelot Coliseum in San Juan, Puerto Rico. Two songs were premiered online before the album's release, "Trepando Paredes" and the remix version of "Plakito", to which were added vocals from the Puerto Rican singer Farruko, both featuring the catchphrase "Legacy" at the intro. Neither of them were included, but they were included later on the Deluxe Edition of his 2015 live album Legacy: De Líder a Leyenda Tour, an advance of the Legacy EP, which was released on February 3, 2015.

== Track listing ==
Source.

No.	Title	Writer(s)	Length
1.	"Jaque Mate"	Llandel Veguilla; Christian Ramos; Robin John Méndez; Roberto Vazquez	3:33
2.	"Mi Nena"	Veguilla; Vazquez; Justin Rafael Quiles; Ernesto Padilla	3:39
3.	"Me Enamoré"	Veguilla; Quiles; Vazquez; Egbert Rosa	3:10
4.	"Olé"	Veguilla; Eliezer Palacios; Gabriel Rodríguez; Giencarlos Rivera; Jonathan Rivera; Méndez; Ramón Ayala	4:06
5.	"Duro Hasta Abajo" (featuring Gadiel)	Veguilla; Gadiel Veguilla; Marcos Masis	2:57

== Charts ==
Chart (2014)	Peak position
US Billboard Latin Rhythm Albums	1
US Top Latin Albums	14
