= Como Antes =

Single by Yandel featuring Wisin

from the album #Update
- Released: September 8, 2017
- Genre: Reggaeton
- Length: 3:30
- Label: Sony Latin
- Songwriters: Llandel Veguilla; Juan Luis Morera; Marco Masis; Victor Viera
- Producers: Tainy; Jumbo

Yandel singles chronology
"Explícale" (2017)	"Como Antes" (2017)	"Se Acabó El Amor" (2018)

Wisin singles chronology
"Si Tú la Ves" (2017)	"Como Antes" (2017)	"Amor, Amor, Amor" (2017)

Music video
- "Como Antes" on YouTube

"Como Antes" is a single by Puerto Rican singer and songwriter Yandel from his fourth studio album Update. The track features Yandel's longtime duo companion Wisin, being their first song in five years. It was digitally released on September 8, 2017 under Sony Music Latin as the record's third single. A music video directed by Jessy Terrero premiered on September 7, 2017. The song was written by Yandel, Wisin, with producers Tainy, and Jumbo.

== Background and release ==
Yandel stated that "Como Antes" is "a very danceable reggaeton song with an energy just like old times". The concept of the song was "to remember the music that Wisin & Yandel used to make before" but adding "a touch of 2017 by giving an update to that type of music." The lyrics mention various songs by Wisin & Yandel, including "En La Disco Bailoteo" (2003), "Dembow" (2003), "Saoco" (2004), "Mírala Bien" (2005), "Pam Pam" (2006), "Pegao" (2006), "La Pared" (2007), and "Ahora Es" (2007). It is the duo's first song in five years, following their hiatus since mid-2013. "Como Antes" was digitally released on September 8, 2017 alongside Yandel's album Update as its third single.

== Reception ==
Suzette Fernandez of Billboard stated that the duo "goes back to their roots, to their unique sound and street lyrics," being elements that "have been lost with the evolution of the genre, but made them an iconic urban duo back in the early 2000s." Isabelia Herrera of Remezcla.com praised the production of the song by stating that it is "a glorious rush of throwback perreo, complete with old school snare rolls, a stream of shout outs in the outro, and the moan of a reggaeton chorus girl." She concluded her review by expressing that the track "is indeed a powerful version of their 'receta original,' even if 'ponle dembow' and 'pam-pam-pam' aren't the most inspired hooks of the duo's career." An editor of Colombian digital magazine KienyKe stated that the success of the song is caused by "a production that combines the sounds from the past and the present to perfection." The redactor also expressed that "the song conserves the duo's classic style, with a melody that remembers classics such as 'Pegao', 'Dembow', 'Rakata', 'Mírala Bien', or 'El Teléfono'."

== Commercial performance ==
In the United States, the single debuted at number 13 on the Hot Latin Songs chart on September 30, 2017, becoming the highest-charting single of Update. It also reached number 16 on Bubbling Under Hot 100 Singles, number 1 on Latin Airplay, number 3 on Latin Digital Songs, number 4 on Latin Pop Songs, number 1 on Latin Rhythm Airplay, and number 18 on Latin Streaming Songs. The single peaked at number 7 on the Hot Latin Songs chart on October 7, 2017. According to Nielsen SoundScan, "Como Antes" sold 3,649 downloads as of September 14, 2017.

Internationally, the song reached number 6 in El Salvador, number 7 in Paraguay, number 8 in Dominican Republic, number 12 in Chile, number 17 in Guatemala, number 23 in Venezuela, number 38 in Ecuador, and number 48 in Colombia.

== Music video ==
A music video for the single premiered on September 7, 2017 on Yandel's official YouTube channel and was directed by Dominican director Jessy Terrero. Filming of the music video took place at an automobile repair shop located in Miami, Florida in July 2017. Terrero had previously directed eighteen videoclips by Wisin & Yandel as duo, including "Sexy Movimiento" (2007), "Me Estás Tentando" (2008), "Abusadora" (2009), "Algo Me Gusta de Ti" (2012), and "Follow the Leader" (2012). Isabelia Herrera of American website Remezcla.com stated that the music video "finds our favorite sunglass-clad reggaetoneros in a flashy, neon-lit warehouse, in the middle of a rave with a parade of models."

== Credits and personnel ==
- Miguel Correa – assistant engineer
- Edwin Díaz – assistant engineer
- Earcandy – recording engineer, mixing
- Mike Fuller – mastering
- Jumbo – producer, songwriting
- Andre Mendoza – assistant engineer
- Tainy – producer, songwriting
- Wisin – songwriting, lead vocals
- Yandel – songwriting, lead vocals

== Charts ==
=== Weekly charts ===
Chart (2017)	Peak position
Bolivia (Monitor Latino)	15
Chile (Monitor Latino)	12
Colombia (National-Report)	20
Dominican Republic (Monitor Latino)	2
Ecuador (National-Report)	38
El Salvador (Monitor Latino)	6
Guatemala (Monitor Latino)	17
Honduras (Monitor Latino)	9
Mexico Español Airplay (Billboard)	46
Paraguay (Monitor Latino)	2
Spain (PROMUSICAE)	62
US Bubbling Under Hot 100 (Billboard)	16
US Hot Latin Songs (Billboard)	7
US Latin Airplay (Billboard)	1
US Latin Rhythm Airplay (Billboard)	1
Venezuela (National-Report)	18

=== Year-end charts ===
Chart (2017)	Position
US Hot Latin Songs (Billboard)	56
Chart (2018)	Position
US Hot Latin Songs (Billboard)	78

== Certifications ==
Region	Certification	Certified units/sales
Colombia	Gold	
Spain (Promusicae)	Gold	20,000^{‡}
United States (RIAA)	7× Platinum (Latin)	420,000^{‡}
^{‡} Sales+streaming figures based on certification alone.

== See also ==
- List of Billboard number-one Latin songs of 2017
