= Moviendo Caderas =

2014 song performed by Yandel

Single by Yandel featuring Daddy Yankee

from the album De Líder a Leyenda
- Released: February 10, 2014 (radio)
- Genre: Reggaeton
- Length: 3:19
- Label: Sony Music Latin
- Songwriters: Llandel Veguilla; Ramón L. Ayala; Victor Delgado; Eli Palacios; Gabriel Rodríguez; Francisco Saldaña; Giencarlos Rivera Tapia; Jonathan Rivera Tapia
- Producers: Luny; MadMusick; Predikador

Yandel singles chronology
"In Your Eyes (Remix)" (2013)	"Moviendo Caderas" (2014)	"Plakito" (2014)

Daddy Yankee singles chronology
"La Nueva y La Ex" (2013)	"Moviendo Caderas" (2014)	"Ora por Mi" (2014)

Music video
- "Moviendo Caderas" on YouTube

"Moviendo Caderas", ("Moving Hips") is a song by Puerto Rican reggaeton recording artist Yandel featuring Daddy Yankee, from his second studio album, De Líder a Leyenda (2013). It was composed by Yandel, with the help of Ramón L. Ayala (Daddy Yankee), Victor Delgado, Eliezer Palacios, Gabriel Rodríguez, Francisco Saldaña, Geancarlos Rivera Tapia and Jonathan Rivera Tapia, it was produced by Luny Tunes, Jonathan Rivera Tapia and Predikador. It was announced through his Twitter that the song would be released as the third single off the album on February 10, 2014. The song's accompanying music video was directed by Carlos Pérez and filmed in Puerto Rico. The video was premiered on Vevo on February 21, 2014. and it is also selected for Univision's Thursday Night Football.

== Critical reception ==
Lety Zárate from Monitor Latino gave the song a positive review and said that: "Hablé de Ti" and "Hasta Abajo" were the first two letters that Yandel played in the Hispanic radio from the United States and Puerto Rico making pleasant and unexpected results. However one would have to come third proposal to overcome the above and does so accompanied by the voice and talent of Daddy Yankee, who impresses with a contagious flavor to "Moviendo Caderas" – "Moviendo Caderas" is a clear invitation to relaxation, the party that has always characterized Yandel on their way through the music market."

== Charts ==
=== Weekly charts ===
Chart (2014)	Peak position
Colombia (National-Report)	5
Mexican Pop Airplay (Billboard)	15
Mexico (Billboard Mexican Airplay)	37
Spain (Promusicae)	27
US Hot Latin Songs (Billboard)	10
US Latin Airplay (Billboard)	5
US Latin Rhythm Airplay (Billboard)	2
US Latin Pop Airplay (Billboard)	4
US Tropical Airplay (Billboard)	21

=== Year-end charts ===
Chart (2014)	Position
US Hot Latin Songs (Billboard)	34

== Certifications ==
Region	Certification	Certified units/sales
Mexico (AMPROFON)	Gold	30,000^{*}
Spain (Promusicae)	2× Platinum	120,000^{‡}
United States (RIAA)	6× Platinum (Latin)	360,000^{‡}
Streaming
Spain (Promusicae)	Platinum	8,000,000^{†}
^{*} Sales figures based on certification alone.^{‡} Sales+streaming figures based on certification alone.^{†} Streaming-only figures based on certification alone.
