= Calentura (song) =

Single by Yandel

from the album Dangerous
- Released: March 16, 2015
- Genre: Reggaeton
- Length: 3:09 (Album version); 3:33 (Remix feat. Tempo); 3:41 (Trap version feat. Lil Jon)
- Label: Sony Music Latin
- Songwriters: Llandel Veguilla; Egbert Rosa; Gabriel Lebrón; Auberto Duprey
- Producers: Haze; Los Harmónicos; Yandel

Yandel singles chronology
"Noche y Día" (2015)	"Calentura" (2015)	"Como Yo Te Quiero" (2015)

Music video
- "Calentura" on YouTube

"Calentura" is a song by Puerto Rican reggaetón singer-songwriter Yandel. It was written and produced by himself, Egbert Rosa (a.k.a. Haze), Gabriel Lebrón and Auberto Duprey (a.k.a. Los Harmónicos). It was released as the lead single off his upcoming third studio album Dangerous on March 16, 2015. An official remix was released on May 15, 2015, featuring Puerto Rican rapper Tempo. A trap version was released on September 4, 2015, featuring US rapper Lil Jon.

== Music video ==
The music video for the song was directed by longtime director Jessy Terrero, filmed in Caracas, Venezuela and released through his Vevo / YouTube channel on March 16, 2015. The video shows body painted girls and soft erotic scenes which has made the video were described as 'sexy and daring'. The music video for the remix version featuring Tempo was also directed by Terrero and was released on May 15, 2015.

== Release history ==
Country	Date	Format	Label(s)
United States	March 16, 2015	Digital download	Sony Music Latin (Sony Music)
United States	May 15, 2015	Remix, digital download	Sony Music Latin (Sony Music)
United States	September 4, 2015	Trap version, digital download	Sony Music Latin (Sony Music)

== Charts ==
Chart (2015)	Peak position
US Hot Latin Songs (Billboard)	10
US Latin Pop Airplay (Billboard)	5
US Latin Airplay (Billboard)	1
US Latin Rhythm Airplay (Billboard)	1

== Certifications ==
Region	Certification	Certified units/sales
United States (RIAA)	Platinum (Latin)	60,000^{‡}
^{‡} Sales+streaming figures based on certification alone.

== See also ==
- List of Billboard number-one Latin songs of 2015
