= Coyote Lake (San Bernardino County, California) =

Coyote Dry Lake
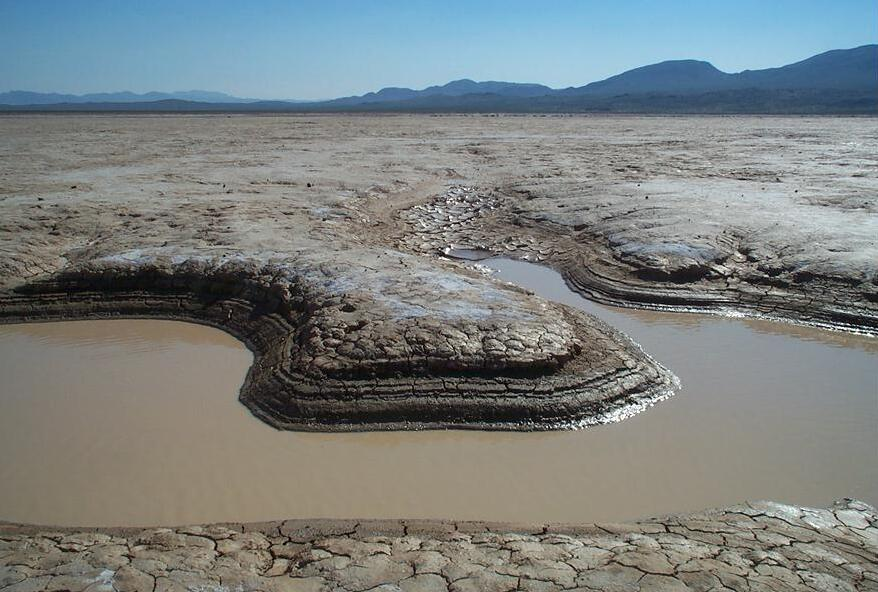

- Location within California Location within the United States
- Location: Mojave Desert; San Bernardino County, California
- Coordinates: 35.0702°N 116.7547°W
- Lake type: Endorheic basin
- Primary outflows: Terminal
- Basin countries: United States
- Max. length: 10 km (6.2 mi)
- Max. width: 6 km (3.7 mi)
- Shore length^{1}: 30 km (19 mi)
- Surface elevation: 515 m (1,690 ft)
- References: U.S. Geological Survey Geographic Names Information System: Coyote Lake
- ^{1} Shore length is not a well-defined measure.

Coyote Dry Lake is a dry lake bed in the Mojave Desert of San Bernardino County, California, 15 mi (24 km) northeast of Barstow. The lake is approximately 10 km (6.2 mi) by 6 km (3.7 mi) at its widest point.

Coyote Dry Lake lies to the south of Fort Irwin Military Reservation and southwest of the Tiefort Mountains. St. Antony's Monastery is located about 4 mi (6.4 km) to the southeast.

Numerous meteorites have been found on the lake bed.

== See also ==
- List of lakes in California
