= Encantadora (song) =

2015 song by Yandel

Single by Yandel

from the album Dangerous
- Released: October 2, 2015
- Genre: Reggaeton; reggae fusion
- Length: 4:00
- Label: Sony Latin
- Songwriters: Llandel Veguilla; Carlos Reyes; Egbert Rosa; Eduardo Vargas
- Producer: Haze

Yandel singles chronology
"Calentura" (2015)	"Encantadora" (2015)	"Take It Off" (2016)

Music video
- "Encantadora" on YouTube

"Encantadora" is a single by Puerto Rican singer-songwriter Yandel from his third studio album Dangerous. It was released on October 2, 2015 under Sony Music Latin as the record's lead single. A music video premiered on November 30, 2015. The song was written by Yandel, Farruko, Egbert "Haze" Rosa and Eduardo Vargas, and was produced by Haze. A remix version featuring Farruko and the duo Zion & Lennox was released on March 18, 2016. "Encantadora" garnered Latin Grammy Awards for Best Urban Song and Best Urban Fusion/Performance at the 17th Annual Latin Grammy Awards. It is Yandel's most successful single as soloist, reaching number 3 on the US Hot Latin Songs chart and having more than 420,000 sales plus track-equivalent units between the United States and Spain.

== Reception ==
=== Accolades ===
"Encantadora" received Latin Grammy Awards for Best Urban Song and Best Urban Fusion/Performance at the 17th Annual Latin Grammy Awards. It was also nominated for Latin American Music Awards for Song of the Year and Favorite Urban Song at the 2nd Latin American Music Awards and for a Lo Nuestro Award for Urban Song of the Year at the 29th Lo Nuestro Awards.

Year	Ceremony	Date	Category	Recipients	Result	Ref.
2016	Latin American Music Awards	October 6, 2016	Song of the Year	Yandel	Nominated	
2016	Latin American Music Awards	October 6, 2016	Favorite Urban Song	Yandel	Nominated	
2016	Latin Grammy Awards	November 17, 2016	Best Urban Song	Yandel, Farruko, Haze and Eduardo Vargas	Won	
2016	Latin Grammy Awards	November 17, 2016	Best Urban Fusion/Performance	Yandel	Won	
2017	Lo Nuestro Awards	February 23, 2017	Urban Song of the Year	Yandel	Nominated	
2017	ASCAP Awards	March 15, 2017	Latin Award-Winning Urban Songs	Yandel	Recipient	

== Chart performance ==
In the United States, "Encantadora" peaked at number 3 on the Hot Latin Songs chart on April 6, 2016 and at number 7 on Tropical Songs on February 27, 2016. It eventually received a 14× platinum (Latin) certification by the Recording Industry Association of America in 2021, denoting units of over 840,000 song-equivalent units.

Internationally, the song peaked at number 48 on Billboard's Mexico Airplay, at number 45 in Venezuela, and at number 24 in Spain, where it charted for 80 weeks from October 16, 2015 to April 27, 2017. The remix version received a 3× platinum certification by the Spanish Music Producers for units of over 120,000 sales plus track-equivalent streams.

== Formats and track listings ==
Digital download

1. "Encantadora" – 4:00

Digital download (Remix)

1. "Encantadora" (featuring Farruko and Zion & Lennox) – 4:12

== Credits and personnel ==
- Willy Colón – acoustic guitar
- Ismael Guerra – recording engineer
- Mike Fuller – mastering
- Martin Nieves – assistant engineer
- Farruko – songwriting
- Egbert "Haze" Rosa Cintrón – producer, songwriting
- Roberto "Earcandy" Vázquez – recording engineer, mixing
- Yandel – lead vocals, songwriting

== Charts ==
=== Weekly charts ===
Chart (2015–16)	Peak position
Mexico Airplay (Billboard)	48
Spain (PROMUSICAE) Remix version	24
US Hot Latin Songs (Billboard)	3
US Latin Airplay (Billboard)	1
US Latin Rhythm Airplay (Billboard)	1
US Tropical Songs (Billboard)	7
Venezuela (National-Report)	45

Chart (2017)	Peak position
Spain (PROMUSICAE)	66
Venezuela (National-Report)	93

=== Monthly charts ===
Chart (2016)	Position
Venezuela (National-Report)	48

=== Year-end charts ===
Chart (2016)	Position
Spain (PROMUSICAE)	33
US Hot Latin Songs (Billboard)	9
US Tropical Songs (Billboard)	38

== Certifications ==
Region	Certification	Certified units/sales
Mexico (AMPROFON)	2× Diamond+3× Platinum	780,000^{‡}
Spain (Promusicae)	3× Platinum	180,000^{‡}
Spain (Promusicae) Remix version	3× Platinum	120,000^{‡}
United States (RIAA)	14× Platinum (Latin)	840,000^{‡}
^{‡} Sales+streaming figures based on certification alone.

== See also ==
- List of Billboard number-one Latin songs of 2016
