= Hablé de Ti =

Single by Yandel

from the album De Líder a Leyenda
- Released: June 7, 2013
- Genre: Dance-pop
- Length: 3:41
- Label: Sony Music Latin
- Songwriters: Llandel Veguilla; Marco Masís
- Producers: Tainy; Mr. Earcandy

Yandel singles chronology
"Amor Real" (2013)	"Hablé de Ti" (2013)	"Hasta Abajo" (2013)

Music video
- " Hablé de Ti" on YouTube

"Hablé de Ti" (English: I Spoke of You) is a song by Puerto Rican reggaetón singer-songwriter Yandel. It was written by Yandel and Marcos Masis, produced by Tainy and Mr. Earcandy, and released as the lead single off his second studio album, De Líder a Leyenda (2013) on July 10, 2013. The song's accompanying music video was shot in June 2013 in Los Ángeles, California and premiered on VEVO on July 29, 2013, and was directed by Carlos Pérez. The video has over 27 million views on YouTube. An English version of the song was also recorded and included on De Líder a Leyenda.

== Charts ==
=== Weekly charts ===
Chart (2013)	Peak position
Mexico Español (Billboard Mexican Airplay)	41
US Hot Latin Songs (Billboard)	5
US Latin Airplay (Billboard)	1
US Latin Rhythm Airplay (Billboard)	1
US Latin Pop Airplay (Billboard)	3
US Tropical Airplay (Billboard)	6

=== Year-end charts ===
Chart (2013)	Position
US Hot Latin Songs (Billboard)	28

== Release history ==
Country	Date	Format	Label(s)
Worldwide	July 10, 2013	Digital download	Sony Music Latin (Sony Music)
United States	October 8, 2013	Digital download	Sony Music Latin (Sony Music)

== Certifications ==
Region	Certification	Certified units/sales
United States (RIAA)	Platinum (Latin)	60,000^{‡}
^{‡} Sales+streaming figures based on certification alone.

== See also ==
- List of Billboard number-one Latin songs of 2013
- List of Billboard Latin Rhythm Airplay number ones of 2013
