= Hasta Abajo (Yandel song) =

Single by Yandel

from the album De Líder a Leyenda
- Released: October 14, 2013
- Genre: Latin pop
- Length: 3:27
- Label: Sony Music Latin
- Songwriters: Llandel Veguilla; Marco Masís
- Producers: Tainy; Mr. Earcandy

Yandel singles chronology
"Hablé de Ti" (2013)	"Hasta Abajo" (2013)	"In Your Eyes (Remix)" (2013)

Music video
- "Hasta Abajo" on YouTube

"Hasta Abajo" (English: Up Down) is a song by Puerto Rican reggaetón recording artist Yandel from his second studio album De Líder a Leyenda (2013). It was written by Yandel and Marco Masís, produced by Tainy (Masís) and Mr. Earcandy. It was released as the second single from the album on October 14, 2013, following the release of "Hablé de Ti". The music video for the song was filmed in a desert of the South of California, under the direction of Carlos Pérez, premiered on October 28, 2013. The video has over 79 million views on YouTube.

== Charts ==
Chart (2013/14)	Peak position
Mexico (Billboard Mexican Airplay)	19
Mexico Español (Billboard Mexican Airplay)	10
US Hot Latin Songs (Billboard)	9
US Latin Airplay (Billboard)	1
US Latin Rhythm Airplay (Billboard)	1
US Latin Pop Airplay (Billboard)	1
US Tropical Airplay (Billboard)	29

== Certifications ==
Region	Certification	Certified units/sales
United States (RIAA)	2× Platinum (Latin)	120,000^{‡}
^{‡} Sales+streaming figures based on certification alone.

== Release history ==
Country	Date	Format	Label(s)
Worldwide	October 14, 2013	Digital download	Sony Music Latin (Sony Music)
United States	December 17, 2013	Digital download	Sony Music Latin (Sony Music)

== See also ==
- List of Billboard number-one Latin songs of 2014
