= De Líder a Leyenda =

Studio album by Yandel
- Released: November 5, 2013
- Recorded: List: 2012 – 2013 at: Earcandy Studios, Orlando, FL; El Orfanato Studio, New Jersey; J House Music Group Studios, New York; Gaby Music Studios, Jeanius Laboratory, Miami, FL; Pina Records, Puerto Rico
- Genres: Dance-pop; Reggaeton; Latin pop
- Length: 56:24
- Label: Sony Music
- Producers: Yandel (also executive); Tainy; Nely; JY (El De La J); Luny Tunes; Predikador; Alberto "The Legacy" Torres; Roberto "Tito" Vazquez

Yandel chronology
Quien Contra Mí (2003)	De Líder a Leyenda (2013)	Legacy: De Líder a Leyenda Tour (EP) (2014)

Singles from De Líder a Leyenda
- 1. "Hablé de Ti" Released: June 7, 2013; 2. "Hasta Abajo" Released: October 14, 2013; 3. "Moviendo Caderas" Released: February 10, 2014; 4. "Plakito" Released: July 29, 2014

De Líder a Leyenda (English: From Leader to Legend) is the second studio album by Puerto Rican reggaeton artist Yandel, of the duo Wisin & Yandel; it was released on November 5, 2013. "Hablé de Ti" was released as the lead single of the album on June 7, 2013, the second single "Hasta Abajo" was released on October 15, 2013, "Moviendo Caderas" featuring Reggaeton singer Daddy Yankee was released as third single on February 10, 2014. "Déjate Amar" was released as fourth single on June 27, 2014. "Plakito" featuring Gadiel was released as the fifth official single from the album on July 29, 2014, a remix featuring vocals from Puerto Rican singer Farruko was released on September 25, 2014. At the Latin Grammy Awards of 2014, the album received a nomination Best Urban Music Album. It received a nomination for the Billboard Latin Music Award for Latin Rhythm Album of the Year in 2014.

== Critical response ==
Professional ratings
Review scores
Source	Rating
Allmusic	4/5 stars

David Jeffries from Allmusic gave the album 4 stars out of 5. Here is an extract of his review:

After the early 2013 announcement that Wisin & Yandel had not broken up but were taking a break, Yandel mentioned he was "anxious" to get back to his solo career, and here is the plentiful proof. As bold and as brash as its title, De Líder a Leyenda lands with only a handful of guest shots (including J Alvarez, Daddy Yankee and Don Omar) and a big, 16-song track list (17 if you count the English version of "Hablé de Ti") but as the Yandel overflows, so do the hooky, slick club numbers, most all of them hitting the target. "Hablé de Ti," "Hasta Abajo," and the skittish wonder dubbed "Fallaron" lead the pack of swag-flashing party numbers, and still, the album rounds itself out well when slower, deeper tracks, like the great "Déjate Amar," offer warm and welcome breaks from the flashing club lights.

== Chart performance ==
De Líder a Leyenda debuted at number one on the Billboard Top Latin Albums, becoming his highest debut on the U.S. charts as solo artist, the album also debuted at number nine on the Top Rap Albums and at number 76 on the Billboard 200. On the Mexican Albums Chart the album debuted at number four.

== Singles ==
"Hablé de Ti" served as the lead single from De Líder a Leyenda. The song was released on June 7, 2013. The music video, filmed in Los Ángeles, California, was directed by Carlos Pérez.

"Hasta Abajo", was released as the album's second single on October 15, 2013. The music video was also directed by Carlos Pérez, and filmed in a desert of the South of California.

"Moviendo Caderas" serves as third single, it features Reggaeton singer Daddy Yankee. The song was first released on February 10, 2014. Once again, the video was directed by Carlos Pérez and filmed in his natal Puerto Rico.

"Plakito" featuring his sibling Gadiel was released as the fourth single from the album on July 29, 2014 along with the music video directed by Fernando Lugo. A remix featuring vocals from Puerto Rican singer Farruko was released on September 23, 2014.

=== Promotional singles ===
"Da Show" was released online as promotional single on July 22, 2013. The music video, directed by Luis Carmona, includes visual exclusive, captured through his phone over the time.

"Déjate Amar" was released as promotional single on June 27, 2014. On April 30, a preview of the video, directed by LabTwenty, was released through his Instagram account.

"En La Oscuridad" was released on July 8, 2014 as promotional single from the album with a digital download release, taking form as a salsa version (not included on the album) featuring Puerto Rican recording artist, Gilberto Santa Rosa.

== De Líder a Leyenda VIP Tour ==
De Líder a Leyenda VIP Tour is the first concert tour by Yandel. The first leg commenced on June 5, 2014 in San Francisco, and concluded on June 28, 2014 in Miami, the second leg commenced on September 13, 2014 in Concepción, Paraguay, and will conclude on November 19, 2014 in Las Vegas. An extended play, entitled Legacy: De Líder a Leyenda Tour (EP), was released exclusively to digital marketplaces to support the tour.

=== Tour dates ===
Date	City or County	Place
First leg
June 5, 2014	San Francisco	The Fillmore
June 6, 2014	Las Vegas	House of Blues
June 7, 2014	Los Angeles	House of Blues
June 12, 2014	McAllen	Convention Center
June 13, 2014	Dallas	House of Blues
June 14, 2014	Houston	House of Blues
June 19, 2014	Chicago	House of Blues
June 20, 2014	Washington, D.C.	The Fillmore
June 21, 2014	New York City	Irving Plaza
June 27, 2014	Orlando	House of Blues
June 28, 2014	Miami	The Fillmore
Second leg
September 13, 2014	Concepción, Paraguay	Centro de Exposiciones Nanawa
September 18, 2014	Buenos Aires	Luna Park, Buenos Aires
September 19, 2014	Asunción	Casco Antiguo
September 20, 2014	Encarnación, Paraguay	Club Nacional de Encarnación
October 4, 2014	San Juan, Puerto Rico	José Miguel Agrelot Coliseum
October 5, 2014	Santo Domingo	Estadio Olímpico Félix Sánchez
October 11, 2014	Mexico City	Pepsi Center WTC
October 12, 2014	Tampa, Florida	Coachman Park
October 25, 2014	Santiago	Movistar Arena
November 19, 2014	Las Vegas	Mandalay Bay Convention Center

== Track listing ==
No.	Title	Writer(s)	Producer(s)	Length
1.	"Hablé de Ti"	Llandel Veguilla, Marcos Masis	Tainy	3:41
2.	"Hasta Abajo"	Veguilla, Masis	Tainy	3:27
3.	"Mano Al Aire"	Veguilla, Masis		2:50
4.	"Déjate Amar"	Veguilla, Masis		3:39
5.	"Enamorado De Ti" (featuring Don Omar)	Veguilla, Masis		3:51
6.	"La Cama"	Veguilla, Masis, Christian Ramos	Tainy	3:20
7.	"Moviendo Caderas" (featuring Daddy Yankee)	Veguilla, Ramón L. Ayala, Victor Delgado, Eliezer Palacios, Gabriel Rodríguez, Francisco Saldaña, Geancarlos Rivera Tapia, Jonathan Rivera Tapia		3:19
8.	"No Perdamos Tiempo"	Veguilla, Masis		3:03
9.	"En La Oscuridad"	Veguilla, Masis, Ramos, Jean Rodríguez, Fabian Worell		3:20
10.	"Sudor"	Veguilla, Alberto "The Legacy" Torres, Roberto "Tito" Vazquez		3:19
11.	"Fallaron"	Veguilla, Masis		2:50
12.	"Para Irnos (A Fuego)" (featuring J Alvarez & Gadiel)	Veguilla, Masis, Nelson Diaz, Gadiel Veguilla, Pedro Santana, Javid Álvarez		3:39
13.	"Nada Que Perder"	Veguilla, Christopher Montalvo		3:52
14.	"Da Show"	Veguilla, Masis	Tainy	2:46
15.	"Plakito" (featuring Gadiel)	Veguilla, Gabriel Veguilla, Josias De La Cruz		3:11
16.	"Persígueme"	Veguilla, Masis	Tainy	2:36
17.	"Hablé de Ti" (English version)	Veguilla, Masis	Tainy	3:41
Total length:				56:24

== Credits and personnel ==
Credits adapted from AllMusic.

- Llandel Veguilla Malave – vocals, composer, executive producer
- Javid Álvarez – composer, Featured Artist
- Ramon L. Ayala – composer
- Michelle Baluja – vocals (Background)
- Ed Coriano – stylist
- Daddy Yankee – Featured Artist
- Josias De La Cruz – composer, producer
- Victor Delgado – composer
- Nelson Diaz – composer
- Mateo Garcia – Photography
- Chris Gehringer – Mastering
- El General Gadiel – Featured Artist
- Gabrielle Herrera – Label Manager
- Jorge Sanchez – Marketing
- Armando Lozano – Management
- Luny Tunes – producer, vocals
- Gadiel Veguilla Malavé – composer
- Marcos G – engineer
- Andy Martinez – Management
- Marcos Masis – composer
- Marcos "Tainy" Masis – producer
- Christopher Montalvo – composer
- Don Omar – Featured Artist
- Eliezer Palacios – composer
- Carlos Pérez – creative director, Image Development
- Rafael Pina – engineer
- El Predikador – producer, vocals
- Christian Ramos – composer
- Alejandro Reglero – A&R
- Juan Rivera – engineer
- Gabriel Rodríguez – composer
- Jean Rodríguez – composer, engineer, Vocal Arrangement, Vocals (Background)
- Francisco Saldaña – composer
- Pedro Santana – composer
- Geancarlos Rivera Tapia – composer
- Jonathan Rivera Tapia – composer
- Juan Toro – Booking
- Alberto "The Legacy" Torres – composer, producer
- Roberto "Tito" Vazquez – composer, engineer, mixing, producer
- Fabian Worell – composer

== Charts and certifications ==
=== Weekly charts ===
Chart (2013)	Peak position
Mexican Albums (AMPROFON)	4
US Billboard 200	76
US Top Latin Albums (Billboard)	1
US Latin Rhythm Albums (Billboard)	1
US Top Rap Albums (Billboard)	9

=== Year-end charts ===
Chart (2014)	Position
US Top Latin Albums (Billboard)	23

=== Certifications ===
Region	Certification	Certified units/sales
United States (RIAA)	Platinum (Latin)	60,000^{‡}
^{‡} Sales+streaming figures based on certification alone.

== See also ==
- List of number-one Billboard Latin Albums from the 2010s
